= 2002–03 FC Barcelona Bàsquet season =

Spanish basketball club season

FC Barcelona
2002–03 season
- President: Joan Gaspart; Enric Reyna
- Head coach: Svetislav Pešić
- Arena: Palau Blaugrana
- Liga ACB: Winners
- EuroLeague: Winners
- Copa del Rey: Winners
- Biggest win: 93–47 vs Jabones Pardo Fuenlabrada (29 September 2002)
- Biggest defeat: 83–55 vs Adecco Estudiantes (23 March 2003)
Home	Away
- All statistics correct as of 2 July 2025.

The 2002–03 season was FC Barcelona's 77th in existence, their 39th consecutive season in the top flight of Spanish basketball and 5th consecutive season in the EuroLeague.

In the 2002–03 season, FC Barcelona competed in the Liga ACB, Copa del Rey and EuroLeague, winning all three.

== Overview ==
=== Pre-season ===
Svetislav Pešić became the team's head coach after the departure of Aíto García Reneses, who had finished the last of his three lengthy coaching spells at Barcelona. The Barcelona board decided against renewing Reneses' contract after 15 seasons at the helm of the team.

Losing key players such as Artūras Karnišovas and Efthimios Rentzias during the summer, Barcelona made important signings to strengthen the team. The first was two time EuroLeague winner Dejan Bodiroga, whose contract with European champions Panathinaikos had expired. The appointment of his countryman Pešić as coach was said to have influenced his decision to join Barcelona.

Another addition was Slovene-Italian forward Gregor Fučka, who previously played for Fortitudo Bologna. Fučka has previously won the 1999 EuroBasket with Italy and was considered one of the best players in Europe. The roster was completed with the signing of German center Patrick Femerling, who had played the previous season for Olympiacos.

Between September 25 and 26, Barcelona took part in the 2002 edition of the Lliga Catalana de Bàsquet, held at the Pavelló Barris Nord in Lleida. After beating Ricoh Manresa in the semifinals, Barcelona lost the final against Caprabo Lleida.

== Players ==
=== Roster ===
Note: Flags indicate national team eligibility at FIBA-sanctioned events. Players may hold other non-FIBA nationalities not displayed.

FC Barcelona roster
Players
Coaches

Pos.	No.	Nat.	Name	Ht.	Wt.	Age
G	5	(Spain)	Rodríguez, Ignacio	1.86 m (6 ft 1 in)	84 kg (185 lb)	32 – 2 September 1970
C	6	(Spain)	Alzamora, Alfons	2.06 m (6 ft 9 in)	107 kg (236 lb)	24 – 20 May 1979
F/C	7	(Italy)	Fučka, Gregor	2.15 m (7 ft 1 in)	111 kg (245 lb)	31 – 7 August 1971
C	8	(Germany)	Femerling, Patrick	2.16 m (7 ft 1 in)	116 kg (256 lb)	28 – 4 March 1975
SF	9	(Spain)	César, Bravo	2.00 m (6 ft 7 in)		22 – 14 May 1981
G/F	10	(Federal Republic of Yugoslavia)	Bodiroga, Dejan	2.05 m (6 ft 9 in)	110 kg (243 lb)	30 – 2 March 1973
SG	11	(Spain)	Navarro, Juan Carlos	1.93 m (6 ft 4 in)	91 kg (201 lb)	22 – 12 June 1980
C	12	(Spain)	Dueñas, Roberto	2.21 m (7 ft 3 in)	137 kg (302 lb)	27 – 1 November 1975
PG	13	(Lithuania)	Jasikevičius, Šarūnas	1.94 m (6 ft 4 in)	92 kg (203 lb)	27 – 5 March 1976
SF	14	(Spain)	de la Fuente, Rodrigo	2.01 m (6 ft 7 in)	99 kg (218 lb)	26 – 26 November 1976
PF/C	16	(Brazil)	Varejão, Anderson	2.11 m (6 ft 11 in)	118 kg (260 lb)	20 – 28 September 1982
C	18	(Netherlands)	van de Hare, Remon (Y)	2.22 m (7 ft 3 in)	155 kg (342 lb)	20 – 23 May 1982

Head coach

- (Federal Republic of Yugoslavia) Svetislav Pešić

Assistant coach(es)

- (Spain) Joan Montes
- (Spain) Josep Maria Berrocal

Team manager

- (Spain) Joan Creus

Legend

- (C) Team captain
- Injured

- Roster

=== Depth chart ===
Pos.	Starting 5	Bench 1	Bench 2
C	Roberto Dueñas †	Patrick Femerling	Remon van de Hare ‡
PF	Gregor Fučka	Alfons Alzamora †	Anderson Varejão ‡
SF	Dejan Bodiroga	César Bravo †
SG	Rodrigo de la Fuente †	Juan Carlos Navarro †
PG	Šarūnas Jasikevičius	Nacho Rodríguez †

Notes: Blue † – homegrown player; (Note: A homegrown player is a player that played for at least three years before the age of 20 on a Spanish team. In Liga ACB, the team must register at least four homegrown players in rosters of 10–12 players or at least three homegrown players in rosters of 8–9 players. In EuroLeague, the team did not have any limitations regarding the number of homegrown players.) Red * – overseas player; (Note: An overseas player is a player from outside EEA, FIBA Europe or ACP states. In Liga ACB, the team may register at most two overseas players. In EuroLeague, the team did not have any limitations regarding the number of overseas players.) Green ‡ – youth player (Note: In Liga ACB, the team may register under-22 players linked to the youth system. In EuroLeague, the team may register under-20 players linked to the youth system.)

=== Roster changes ===
==== In ====
No.	Pos.	Nat.	Name	Moving from		Type	Date	Source
10	SF	(Federal Republic of Yugoslavia)	Dejan Bodiroga	Panathinaikos	(Greece)	End of contract	12 Jul 2002	
8	C	(Germany)	Patrick Femerling	Olympiacos	(Greece)	Parted ways	2 Aug 2002	
7	PF/C	(Italy)	Gregor Fučka	Fortitudo Bologna	(Italy)	Parted ways	6 Aug 2002	

==== Out ====
No.	Pos.	Nat.	Name	Moving to		Type	Date	Source
8	C	(Italy)	Andrea Camata	Pallacanestro Trieste	(Italy)	End of contract	30 Jun 2002	
14	C	(Greece)	Efthimios Rentzias	Philadelphia 76ers	(United States)	End of contract	3 Jul 2002	
10	SF	(France)	Alain Digbeu	Real Madrid	(Spain)	End of contract	15 Jul 2002	
19	SF	(Lithuania)	Artūras Karnišovas			Retirement	16 Jul 2002	
17	SG	(Spain)	Jordi Grimau	Lleida Bàsquet	(Spain)	Parted ways	6 Aug 2002	
9	PF	(Germany)	Ademola Okulaja	Unicaja	(Spain)	Parted ways	19 Aug 2002	

== Pre-season and friendlies ==
=== Lliga Catalana de Bàsquet ===
22 September 2002 Semifinal	FC Barcelona (Catalonia)	72–65	(Catalonia) Ricoh Manresa	Barcelona
	Scoring by quarter: 20–15, 13–15, 18–19, 21–16
	Pts: Bodiroga 17	Report	Pts: Laviña 15	Arena: Palau Blaugrana; Attendance: 5,300; Referees: Mitjana, Alzuria, Prieto

26 September 2002 Final	Caprabo Lleida (Catalonia)	80–70	(Catalonia) FC Barcelona	Lleida
	Scoring by quarter: 22–15, 20–25, 20–12, 18–18
	Pts: Grimau 21	Report	Pts: Jasikevičius 17	Arena: Pavelló Barris Nord; Attendance: 5,000; Referees: Martín Bertrán, Guirao, Perea

== Competitions ==
=== Overview ===
Competition	First match	Last match	Starting round	Final position	Record							
Competition	First match	Last match	Starting round	Final position	Pld	W	D	L	PF	PA	PD	Win %
Liga ACB	29 September 2002	24 June 2003	Round 1	Winners	44	36		8	3,568	3,303	+265	81.82
EuroLeague	10 October 2002	11 May 2003	Round 1	Winners	22	18		4	1,737	1,608	+129	81.82
Copa del Rey	21 February 2003	23 February 2003	Quarter-finals	Winners	3	3		0	234	214	+20	100.00
Total					69	57	0	12	5,539	5,125	+414	82.61

Last updated: 17 June 2025
Source: Competitions

=== Liga ACB ===
==== League table ====
Pos	Team	GP	GW	GL	PA	PC	Avg	Qualification or relegation
1	FC Barcelona	34	27	7	2792	2588	+204	Qualified to playoffs
2	Pamesa Valencia	34	26	8	2815	2524	+291	Qualified to playoffs
3	Unicaja Málaga	34	24	10	2663	2567	+96	Qualified to playoffs
4	Adecco Estudiantes	34	23	11	2870	2605	+265	Qualified to playoffs
5	Auna Gran Canaria	34	21	13	2834	2713	+121	Qualified to playoffs

Last updated: May 19, 2003.
Source: ACB

==== Results summary ====
Overall						Home					Away				
Pld	W	L	PF	PA	PD	W	L	PF	PA	PD	W	L	PF	PA	PD
34	27	7	2792	2588	+204	15	2	1415	1258	+157	12	5	1377	1330	+47

Source: Competitive matches

==== Results by round ====
Round	1	2	3	4	5	6	7	8	9	10	11	12	13	14	15	16	17	18	19	20	21	22	23	24	25	26	27	28	29	30	31	32	33	34
Ground	H	A	H	A	H	A	H	A	H	A	H	A	H	A	H	A	H	H	A	H	A	H	A	H	A	A	H	A	H	A	H	A	A	H
Result	W	L	W	W	W	L	W	W	W	W	W	L	W	W	W	W	W	W	W	W	W	W	W	W	L	W	L	W	W	L	W	W	W	L
Position	1	5	3	2	1	3	1	2	2	2	2	2	2	2	2	2	2	2	2	2	2	2	1	1	1	1	1	1	1	1	1	1	1	1

Source: Competitive matches
A = Away; H = Home; W = Win; L = Loss; R = Rest

==== Matches ====
29 September 2002 1	FC Barcelona	93–47	Jabones Pardo Fuenlabrada	Barcelona
19:00	Scoring by quarter: 22–13, 24–7, 20–17, 27–10
	Pts: Fučka 18; Rebs: de la Fuente 7 Asts: Jasikevičius 6 PIR: Navarro 24	Boxscore	Pts: Scott 23; Rebs: Scott 9 Asts: Hernández 3 PIR: Scott 24	Arena: Palau Blaugrana; Attendance: 7,600; Referees: José Ramón García Ortiz, Juan Carlos García González, Óscar Perea

6 October 2002 2	Ricoh Manresa	73–71	FC Barcelona	Manresa
12:30	Scoring by quarter: 10–25, 19–15, 27–18, 17–13
	Pts: Laviña 28; Rebs: Oliver, Williams 4 Asts: Oliver 4 PIR: Laviña 22	Boxscore	Pts: Jasikevičius 16; Rebs: Bravo 8 Asts: Rodríguez 7 PIR: Rodríguez 20	Arena: Nou Congost; Attendance: 4,100; Referees: Xavier Amorós, Juan Luis Redondo, José María Terreros

13 October 2002 3	FC Barcelona	75–62	Casademont Girona	Barcelona
12:30	Scoring by quarter: 17–21, 21–12, 18–12, 19–17
	Pts: Fučka 21; Rebs: Fučka 9 Asts: three players 3 PIR: Fučka 23	Boxscore	Pts: Struelens 16; Rebs: Struelens 11; Asts: Ellis 2 PIR: Struelens 19	Arena: Palau Blaugrana; Attendance: 7,200; Referees: Mateo Ramos, Emilio Pérez Pizarro, José Javier Murgui

20 October 2002 4	Cáceres CB	73–84	FC Barcelona	Cáceres
12:30	Scoring by quarter: 27–19, 11–24, 18–15, 17–26
	Pts: López 19; Rebs: García, Thomas 5 Asts: López 4 PIR: López 20	Boxscore	Pts: Dueñas 26; Rebs: Dueñas 7 Asts: Jasikevičius 7 PIR: Dueñas 32	Arena: Multiusos Ciudad de Cáceres; Attendance: 4,680; Referees: Eduardo Sancha, Manel Alzuria, Carlos García León

27 October 2002 5	FC Barcelona	93–78	CB Granada	Barcelona
12:30	Scoring by quarter: 32–11, 17–23, 27–17, 17–27
	Pts: Jasikevičius 17; Rebs: Dueñas 10; Asts: de la Fuente, Rodríguez 3 PIR: Dueñas 24	Boxscore	Pts: Wright 23; Rebs: Wright 7 Asts: Ordín, Sigalas 4 PIR: Wright 21	Arena: Palau Blaugrana; Attendance: 7,200; Referees: Manuel Martínez, José Ramón García Ortiz, Carlos Peruga

3 November 2002 6	Caja San Fernando	93–82	FC Barcelona	Sevilla
18:00	Scoring by quarter: 24–15, 20–20, 22–22, 27–25
	Pts: Elson 27; Rebs: Elson 21; Asts: Santangelo 10; PIR: Elson 46	Boxscore	Pts: Bodiroga, Navarro 19; Rebs: Fučka 7 Asts: Bodiroga 4 PIR: Bodiroga 23	Arena: Palacio de los Deportes; Attendance: 6,900; Referees: Francisco De la Maza, Miguel Ángel Pérez Pérez, Fermín González Díaz

9 November 2002 7	FC Barcelona	70–62	TAU Cerámica	Barcelona
19:00	Scoring by quarter: 14–19, 17–11, 17–23, 22–9
	Pts: Bodiroga 21; Rebs: Fučka 9 Asts: Bodiroga, Rodríguez 3 PIR: Fučka 25	Boxscore	Pts: Allen 18; Rebs: Griffith, Nocioni 5 Asts: Allen 4 PIR: Allen 16	Arena: Palau Blaugrana; Attendance: 8,000; Referees: Xavier Amorós, Juan Antonio Requena, Francisco Araña

16 November 2002 8	Unicaja	75–83(OT)	FC Barcelona	Málaga
19:30	Scoring by quarter: 23–22, 19–19, 19–15, 9–14, Overtime: 5–13
	Pts: Bullock 17; Rebs: Okulaja 10; Asts: Zig 4 PIR: Bullock 15	Boxscore	Pts: Fučka 23; Rebs: Fučka 10; Asts: Jasikevičius 11; PIR: Fučka 33	Arena: Martín Carpena; Attendance: 8,511; Referees: José Antonio Martín Bertrán, Juan Carlos García González, Antonio Conde

1 December 2002 9	FC Barcelona	80–74	Adecco Estudiantes	Barcelona
18:00	Scoring by quarter: 16–18, 22–16, 21–18, 21–22
	Pts: Bodiroga 22; Rebs: Dueñas 9 Asts: Jasikevičius 5 PIR: Bodiroga 28	Boxscore	Pts: Brewer 18; Rebs: Reyes 12; Asts: Azofra, Jiménez 3 PIR: Reyes 21	Arena: Palau Blaugrana; Attendance: 7,900; Referees: Miguelo Betancor, Antonio Gallo, Jesús Alberto Prieto

8 December 2002 10	Leche Río Breogán	70–84	FC Barcelona	Lugo
12:30	Scoring by quarter: 20–20, 16–23, 20–25, 14–16
	Pts: Garcés 20; Rebs: Garcés 8 Asts: Rodríguez 2 PIR: Garcés 21	Boxscore	Pts: Jasikevičius 21; Rebs: Dueñas 11; Asts: Jasikevičius 3 PIR: Dueñas 24	Arena: Pazo dos Deportes; Attendance: 5,700; Referees: Mateo Ramos, José Ramón García Ortiz, José Miguel García Leal

14 December 2002 11	FC Barcelona	81–80	DKV Joventut	Barcelona
19:30	Scoring by quarter: 12–21, 26–19, 19–22, 24–18
	Pts: Bodiroga 19; Rebs: Dueñas, Fučka 8 Asts: Bodiroga 2 PIR: Bodiroga 19	Boxscore	Pts: Baston 15; Rebs: Baston, Marco 5 Asts: Marco 12; PIR: Marco 26	Arena: Palau Blaugrana; Attendance: 8,000; Referees: Juan Carlos Arteaga, Alfredo Ortega, Pilar Landeira

21 December 2002 12	Pamesa Valencia	87–74	FC Barcelona	Valencia
19:30	Scoring by quarter: 19–21, 20–18, 27–16, 21–19
	Pts: Paraíso 17; Rebs: Kammerichs 6 Asts: Tomašević 5 PIR: Paraíso 23	Boxscore	Pts: Navarro 14; Rebs: de la Fuente 6 Asts: Navarro 5 PIR: Navarro 17	Arena: La Fonteta; Attendance: 9,000; Referees: Eduardo Sancha, Juan Antonio Requena, Fermín González Díaz

27 December 2002 13	FC Barcelona	84–75	Fórum Valladolid	Barcelona
21:00	Scoring by quarter: 24–18, 16–19, 22–19, 22–19
	Pts: Bodiroga, Navarro 15; Rebs: Dueñas 11; Asts: Bodiroga 4 PIR: Dueñas 23	Boxscore	Pts: Guibert 17; Rebs: Bonner 9 Asts: Dumas 5 PIR: Bonner 17	Arena: Palau Blaugrana; Attendance: 5,500; Referees: Lluís Guirao, Juan Luis Redondo, Antonio Conde

30 December 2002 14	Real Madrid	75–83	FC Barcelona	Madrid
21:00	Scoring by quarter: 21–17, 22–23, 18–19, 14–24
	Pts: Mumbrú 21; Rebs: Hernández-Sonseca 15; Asts: Mulaomerović 3 PIR: Mumbrú 19	Boxscore	Pts: Bodiroga, Navarro 17; Rebs: Fučka 8 Asts: Bodiroga 4 PIR: Bodiroga 19	Arena: Raimundo Saporta Pavilion; Attendance: 5,200; Referees: José Antonio Martín Bertrán, Juan Carlos García González, José Javier Murgui

5 January 2003 15	FC Barcelona	94–88	Caprabo Lleida	Barcelona
12:30	Scoring by quarter: 27–30, 23–15, 18–23, 26–20
	Pts: Navarro 17; Rebs: Dueñas 11; Asts: Jasikevičius 3 PIR: Dueñas 20	Boxscore	Pts: Grimau 19; Rebs: Bramlett 11; Asts: Grimau 4 PIR: Grimau, Ramos 21	Arena: Palau Blaugrana; Attendance: 7,966; Referees: José Ramón García Ortiz, Felipe Llamazares, Miguel Ángel Pérez Pérez

12 January 2003 16	Auna Gran Canaria	92–97(OT)	FC Barcelona	Las Palmas
19:00	Scoring by quarter: 22–27, 21–15, 21–22, 22–22, Overtime: 6–11
	Pts: Eley 23; Rebs: Larrañaga, Lewis 7 Asts: Lewis 5 PIR: three players 23	Boxscore	Pts: Navarro 22; Rebs: Dueñas 15; Asts: Jasikevičius 5 PIR: Dueñas 25	Arena: Centro Insular de Deportes; Attendance: 5,100; Referees: Juan Carlos Mitjana, Santi Fernández, Carlos Sánchez Monserrat

19 January 2003 17	FC Barcelona	83–80	Lucentum Alicante	Barcelona
12:30	Scoring by quarter: 22–22, 30–24, 17–22, 14–12
	Pts: Navarro 17; Rebs: Femerling 8 Asts: Navarro 4 PIR: Femerling 18	Boxscore	Pts: Perasović 22; Rebs: Roe 12; Asts: Prigioni 5 PIR: Perasović 22	Arena: Palau Blaugrana; Attendance: 7,480; Referees: Eduardo Sancha, Juan Luis Redondo, Anna Cardús

2 February 2003 18	FC Barcelona	89–83(OT)	Ricoh Manresa	Barcelona
12:30	Scoring by quarter: 11–16, 32–17, 15–22, 17–20, Overtime: 14–8
	Pts: Bodiroga 24; Rebs: Dueñas 15; Asts: Jasikevičius 5 PIR: Bodiroga 24	Boxscore	Pts: Oliver 20; Rebs: Llorens 9 Asts: Lázaro 3 PIR: Oliver 18	Arena: Palau Blaugrana; Attendance: 7,763; Referees: Mateo Ramos, Manel Alzuria, Francisco Araña

9 February 2003 19	Jabones Pardo Fuenlabrada	71–83	FC Barcelona	Fuenlabrada
18:00	Scoring by quarter: 23–25, 18–16, 17–25, 13–17
	Pts: Herrmann 23; Rebs: Scott 10; Asts: Hernández 2 PIR: Herrmann 25	Boxscore	Pts: Bodiroga 16; Rebs: Fučka 8 Asts: Jasikevičius 6 PIR: Jasikevičius, Rodríguez 18	Arena: Fernando Martín; Attendance: 5,050; Referees: Xavier Amorós, Juan Antonio Requena, Fermín González Díaz

16 February 2003 20	FC Barcelona	99–82	Cáceres CB	Barcelona
12:30	Scoring by quarter: 29–21, 23–23, 17–19, 30–19
	Pts: Bodiroga 20; Rebs: Dueñas 12; Asts: Navarro 4 PIR: Dueñas 29	Boxscore	Pts: Muoneke 26; Rebs: Petrović 6 Asts: Muoneke 4 PIR: Muoneke 19	Arena: Palau Blaugrana; Attendance: 6,257; Referees: José Antonio Martín Bertrán, Santi Fernández, Juan José Martínez Díez

2 March 2003 21	Casademont Girona	74–80	FC Barcelona	Girona
12:30	Scoring by quarter: 24–16, 15–14, 10–26, 25–24
	Pts: Struelens 21; Rebs: Struelens 9 Asts: Mršić 4 PIR: Struelens 27	Boxscore	Pts: Bodiroga 21; Rebs: Femerling 6 Asts: de la Fuente 3 PIR: Bodiroga 28	Arena: Pavelló Girona-Fontajau; Attendance: 5,369; Referees: Francisco De la Maza, Manuel Martínez, Raúl Sánchez

9 March 2003 22	FC Barcelona	84–70	Caja San Fernando	Barcelona
18:00	Scoring by quarter: 18–16, 21–21, 25–16, 20–16
	Pts: Bodiroga 18; Rebs: Dueñas, Rodríguez 8 Asts: Jasikevičius 5 PIR: Bodiroga 19	Boxscore	Pts: Pérez, Slater 17; Rebs: Elson 10; Asts: Santangelo 5 PIR: Pérez, Slater 17	Arena: Palau Blaugrana; Attendance: 6,518; Referees: Xavier Amorós, José Javier Murgui, Miguel Ángel Pérez Pérez

13 March 2003 23	TAU Cerámica	98–108	FC Barcelona	Vitoria-Gasteiz
20:30	Scoring by quarter: 22–23, 22–24, 19–26, 35–35
	Pts: Nocioni 25; Rebs: Nocioni 8 Asts: Bennett 8 PIR: Nocioni 28	Boxscore	Pts: Navarro 26; Rebs: Navarro 9 Asts: Jasikevičius 5 PIR: Navarro 33	Arena: Fernando Buesa Arena; Attendance: 9,000; Referees: Mateo Ramos, Juan Carlos García González, Óscar Perea

15 March 2003 24	FC Barcelona	81–72	Leche Río Breogán	Barcelona
19:30	Scoring by quarter: 27–13, 15–17, 16–21, 23–21
	Pts: Navarro 19; Rebs: Varejão 10; Asts: Jasikevičius 6 PIR: Varejão 18	Boxscore	Pts: Davis, Rodríguez 15; Rebs: Garcés 11; Asts: Rodríguez 3 PIR: Rodríguez 18	Arena: Palau Blaugrana; Attendance: 6,723; Referees: Juan Carlos Mitjana, Daniel Hierrezuelo, Alfredo Ortega

23 March 2003 25	Adecco Estudiantes	83–55	FC Barcelona	Madrid
18:00	Scoring by quarter: 23–16, 22–15, 16–9, 22–15
	Pts: Jasen 18; Rebs: Gabriel 8 Asts: Azofra 5 PIR: Jasen 27	Boxscore	Pts: Fučka 12; Rebs: three players 4 Asts: four players 2 PIR: Fučka 14	Arena: Palacio Vistalegre; Attendance: 14,900; Referees: Miguelo Betancor, Antonio Gallo, Emilio Pérez Pizarro

30 March 2003 26	CB Granada	66–81	FC Barcelona	Granada
18:00	Scoring by quarter: 19–23, 16–20, 17–21, 14–17
	Pts: Wright 19; Rebs: Wright 10; Asts: four players 1 PIR: Wright 23	Boxscore	Pts: Bodiroga 17; Rebs: Dueñas 11; Asts: Bodiroga, Rodríguez 3 PIR: Bodiroga 23	Arena: Palacio de Deportes; Attendance: 5,000; Referees: Lluís Guirao, José María Rosado, Antonio Conde

1 April 2003 27	FC Barcelona	65–68	Unicaja	Barcelona
20:30	Scoring by quarter: 22–15, 16–18, 10–17, 17–18
	Pts: Navarro 20; Rebs: Fučka 10; Asts: Jasikevičius 5 PIR: Navarro 14	Boxscore	Pts: Bullock 21; Rebs: Kornegay 11; Asts: Gurović 3 PIR: Bullock, Kornegay 18	Arena: Palau Blaugrana; Attendance: 7,627; Referees: Francisco De la Maza, José Javier Murgui, Fermín González Díaz

13 April 2003 28	DKV Joventut	74–77	FC Barcelona	Badalona
12:30	Scoring by quarter: 18–23, 23–19, 16–14, 17–21
	Pts: Espil 21; Rebs: Radulović 9 Asts: Jofresa 3 PIR: Espil 18	Boxscore	Pts: Bodiroga 16; Rebs: Dueñas 7 Asts: de la Fuente, Jasikevičius 3 PIR: Bodiroga 18	Arena: Olímpic de Badalona; Attendance: 8,015; Referees: Juan Carlos Mitjana, Juan Luis Redondo, Juan Carlos García González

21 April 2003 29	FC Barcelona	85–78	Auna Gran Canaria	Barcelona
18:30	Scoring by quarter: 18–16, 28–22, 26–22, 13–18
	Pts: Bodiroga, Dueñas 18; Rebs: Dueñas 8 Asts: Bodiroga 6 PIR: Bodiroga 28	Boxscore	Pts: Lewis 19; Rebs: Eley, Lewis 7 Asts: Eley 5 PIR: Lewis 22	Arena: Palau Blaugrana; Attendance: 7,855; Referees: Mateo Ramos, Manel Alzuria, José Miguel García Leal

27 April 2003 30	Lucentum Alicante	85–75	FC Barcelona	Alacant
18:00	Scoring by quarter: 23–19, 21–19, 21–19, 20–18
	Pts: Roe 26; Rebs: Baldo 6 Asts: Prigioni 9 PIR: Roe 28	Boxscore	Pts: three players 17; Rebs: Fučka 10; Asts: de la Fuente, Navarro 3 PIR: Fučka 18	Arena: Centro de Tecnificación; Attendance: 5,605; Referees: Miguelo Betancor, Vicente Bultó, Alfredo Ortega

29 April 2003 31	FC Barcelona	92–91(OT)	Real Madrid	Barcelona
21:00	Scoring by quarter: 14–19, 22–19, 28–28, 18–16, Overtime: 10–9
	Pts: Navarro 28; Rebs: Dueñas 8 Asts: Jasikevičius, Navarro 5 PIR: Navarro 30	Boxscore	Pts: Alston, Herreros 21; Rebs: Alston 7 Asts: Victoriano 6 PIR: Alston 29	Arena: Palau Blaugrana; Attendance: 8,000; Referees: José Antonio Martín Bertrán, Juan Carlos Arteaga, Carlos Sánchez Monserrat

3 May 2003 32	Caprabo Lleida	70–86	FC Barcelona	Lleida
18:15	Scoring by quarter: 17–33, 13–17, 14–23, 26–13
	Pts: Ramos 15; Rebs: Ramos 6 Asts: Bramlett, Ramos 3 PIR: Ramos 17	Boxscore	Pts: Bodiroga 16; Rebs: Dueñas 10; Asts: Navarro 5 PIR: Dueñas 24	Arena: Pavelló Barris Nord; Attendance: 5,100; Referees: Mateo Ramos, Juan Luis Redondo, Juan José Martínez Díez

15 May 2003 33	Fórum Valladolid	71–74	FC Barcelona	Valladolid
20:45	Scoring by quarter: 19–17, 16–18, 20–18, 16–21
	Pts: Yebra 16; Rebs: McCaskill 10; Asts: four players 2 PIR: McCaskill 20	Boxscore	Pts: Jasikevičius 17; Rebs: Fučka 8 Asts: Navarro 4 PIR: Jasikevičius 16	Arena: Polideportivo Pisuerga; Attendance: 5,000; Referees: Eduardo Sancha, Vicente Bultó, Emilio Pérez Pizarro

17 May 2003 34	FC Barcelona	67–68	Pamesa Valencia	Barcelona
19:30	Scoring by quarter: 16–14, 20–16, 12–26, 19–12
	Pts: Jasikevičius 18; Rebs: Femerling, Varejão 8 Asts: Navarro 4 PIR: Navarro 25	Boxscore	Pts: Oberto 15; Rebs: Hopkins 6 Asts: Oberto 5 PIR: Oberto 21	Arena: Palau Blaugrana; Attendance: 7,988; Referees: Francisco De la Maza, Juan Antonio Requena, Daniel Hierrezuelo

=== ACB Playoffs ===
==== Quarterfinals ====
23 May 2003 1	FC Barcelona	80–63	Lucentum Alicante	Barcelona
20:30	Scoring by quarter: 21–18, 19–15, 20–13, 20–17
	Pts: Fučka 20; Rebs: Dueñas, Fučka 9 Asts: Bodiroga, Rodríguez 4 PIR: Fučka 29	Boxscore	Pts: Roe 18; Rebs: Junyent 9 Asts: Prigioni 4 PIR: Roe 16	Arena: Palau Blaugrana; Attendance: 7,692; Referees: Miguelo Betancor, Antonio Gallo, Miguel Ángel Pérez Pérez

25 May 2003 2	Lucentum Alicante	65–72	FC Barcelona	Alacant
12:30	Scoring by quarter: 18–9, 18–30, 13–13, 16-20
	Pts: Perasović 16; Rebs: Roe 8 Asts: Prigioni 6 PIR: Roe 22	Boxscore	Pts: Navarro 17; Rebs: Dueñas 12; Asts: Jasikevičius, Rodríguez 4 PIR: Navarro 24	Arena: Centro de Tecnificación; Attendance: 5,176; Referees: Mateo Ramos, Juan Carlos Arteaga, Juan Carlos García González

30 May 2003 3	FC Barcelona	73–68	Lucentum Alicante	Barcelona
20:30	Scoring by quarter: 17–17, 24–22, 20–18, 12–11
	Pts: Bodiroga, Fučka 14; Rebs: Femerling 8 Asts: Navarro 4 PIR: Fučka 23	Boxscore	Pts: García, Perasović 14; Rebs: Roe 10; Asts: Prigioni, Stojić 4 PIR: García, Perasović 15	Arena: Palau Blaugrana; Attendance: 6,730; Referees: Juan Carlos Mitjana, José Ramón García Ortiz, Antonio Conde

==== Semifinals ====
5 June 2003 1	FC Barcelona	68–62	Adecco Estudiantes	Barcelona
21:00	Scoring by quarter: 16–14, 16–20, 15–10, 21–18
	Pts: Bodiroga 20; Rebs: Dueñas 9 Asts: Bodiroga 4 PIR: Jasikevičius 22	Boxscore	Pts: Brewer, Keefe 14; Rebs: Keefe 9 Asts: Jiménez 3 PIR: Keefe 19	Arena: Palau Blaugrana; Attendance: 6,813; Referees: Eduardo Sancha, José Antonio Martín Bertrán, José Ramón García Ortiz Murgui

7 June 2003 2	FC Barcelona	79–76	Adecco Estudiantes	Barcelona
19:30	Scoring by quarter: 19–18, 18–21, 21–20, 21–17
	Pts: Bodiroga 25; Rebs: Bodiroga 7 Asts: Bodiroga 5 PIR: Bodiroga 39	Boxscore	Pts: Brewer, Lončar 12; Rebs: Keefe 8 Asts: Azofra 3 PIR: Keefe 13	Arena: Palau Blaugrana; Attendance: 7,214; Referees: Miguelo Betancor, Xavier Amorós, José Javier Murgui

10 June 2003 3	Adecco Estudiantes	85–67	FC Barcelona	Madrid
21:00	Scoring by quarter: 27–16, 17–17, 19–18, 22–16
	Pts: Lončar 24; Rebs: Keefe 7 Asts: Azofra 3 PIR: Lončar 20	Boxscore	Pts: Rodríguez 20; Rebs: Femerling 7 Asts: three players 2 PIR: Rodríguez 22	Arena: Palacio Vistalegre; Attendance: 15,000; Referees: Mateo Ramos, Daniel Hierrezuelo, Juan Carlos García González

12 June 2003 4	Adecco Estudiantes	76–99	FC Barcelona	Madrid
21:00	Scoring by quarter: 13–25, 14–20, 17–33, 32–21
	Pts: Iturbe 21; Rebs: Reyes 10; Asts: Azofra 3 PIR: Iturbe 15	Boxscore	Pts: Navarro 18; Rebs: de la Fuente 9 Asts: Bodiroga 5 PIR: Bodiroga, Fučka 22	Arena: Palacio Vistalegre; Attendance: 15,000; Referees: Eduardo Sancha, José Antonio Martín Bertrán, José Ramón García Ortiz

==== Finals ====
19 June 2003 1	FC Barcelona	76–74	Pamesa Valencia	Barcelona
21:00	Scoring by quarter: 16–16, 16–21, 21–15, 23–22
	Pts: Jasikevičius 22; Rebs: Fučka 8 Asts: Jasikevičius 3 PIR: Jasikevičius, Navarro 21	Boxscore	Pts: Oberto 22; Rebs: Oberto 14; Asts: Oberto 5 PIR: Oberto 30	Arena: Palau Blaugrana; Attendance: 7,832; Referees: Mateo Ramos, Francisco De la Maza, José Ramón García Ortiz

21 June 2003 2	FC Barcelona	80–72	Pamesa Valencia	Barcelona
19:30	Scoring by quarter: 13–16, 20–15, 19–23, 28–18
	Pts: Femerling 20; Rebs: Femerling 13; Asts: Rodríguez 4 PIR: Femerling 36	Boxscore	Pts: Tomašević 15; Rebs: Tomašević 11; Asts: Tomašević 7 PIR: Tomašević 23	Arena: Palau Blaugrana; Attendance: 8,000; Referees: Eduardo Sancha, José Antonio Martín Bertrán, Juan Antonio Requena

24 June 2003 3	Pamesa Valencia	74–82	FC Barcelona	Valencia
21:00	Scoring by quarter: 17–14, 12–32, 30–19, 15–17
	Pts: Oberto 19; Rebs: Tomašević 9 Asts: Tomašević 5 PIR: Oberto 27	Boxscore	Pts: Fučka, Jasikevičius 15; Rebs: Fučka 12; Asts: three players 4 PIR: Fučka 21	Arena: La Fonteta; Attendance: 9,000; Referees: Juan Carlos Mitjana, José Ramón García Ortiz, Daniel Hierrezuelo

=== EuroLeague ===
==== Results summary ====
Overall						Home					Away				
Pld	W	L	PF	PA	PD	W	L	PF	PA	PD	W	L	PF	PA	PD
16	15	1	1298	1021	+277	8	0	664	505	+159	7	1	634	516	+118

Last updated: 10 April 2025.
Source: Competitive matches

==== Group phase ====
Pos	Team	Pld	W	L	PF	PA	PD	Qualification
1	(Italy) Benetton Treviso	14	11	3	1253	1108	+145	Advance to Top 16
2	(Spain) FC Barcelona	14	11	3	1137	1048	+89	Advance to Top 16
3	(Turkey) Efes Pilsen	14	8	6	1072	998	+74	Advance to Top 16
4	(Italy) Skipper Bologna	14	8	6	1085	1087	−2	Advance to Top 16
5	(Croatia) Cibona VIP	14	7	7	1066	1118	−52	Advance to Top 16
6	(France) Pau-Orthez	14	6	8	1076	1124	−48	
7	(Germany) Alba Berlin	14	4	10	1064	1172	−108	
8	(Greece) AEK	14	1	13	1000	1098	−98	

Source: Euroleague

==== Matches ====
10 October 2002 1	FC Barcelona (Spanish Basketball Federation)	94–75	(Italian Basketball Federation) Skipper Bologna	Barcelona
18:45	Scoring by quarter: 20–15, 27–15, 19–20, 28–25
	Pts: Jasikevičius 18; Rebs: Dueñas 6 Asts: Rodríguez 5 PIR: Navarro 19	Boxscore	Pts: Kovačić 20; Rebs: Skelin 6 Asts: three players 2 PIR: Kovačić 18	Arena: Palau Blaugrana; Attendance: 7,320; Referees: Nikolaos Pitsilkas, Nikos Mpotitsis, Milivoje Jovcic

17 October 2002 2	AEK Athens (Hellenic Basketball Federation)	57–62	(Spanish Basketball Federation) FC Barcelona	Lamia
20:45	Scoring by quarter: 13–15, 12–19, 10–17, 22–11
	Pts: Blakney 18; Rebs: Betts 9 Asts: four players 2 PIR: Blakney 14	Boxscore	Pts: Bodiroga 22; Rebs: three players 5 Asts: three players 2 PIR: Bodiroga 29	Arena: Chalkiopoulio Sports Hall; Attendance: 3,000; Referees: Goran Radonjic, Luigi Lamonica, Ilija Belošević

24 October 2002 3	FC Barcelona (Spanish Basketball Federation)	84–62	(French Federation of Basketball) Pau-Orthez	Barcelona
18:45	Scoring by quarter: 22–14, 22–12, 23–22, 17–14
	Pts: Femerling 16; Rebs: Femerling, Varejão 9 Asts: Rodríguez 3 PIR: Femerling 24	Boxscore	Pts: Lukovski 15; Rebs: Pietrus 12; Asts: Lukovski, Pietrus 4 PIR: Lukovski 24	Arena: Palau Blaugrana; Attendance: 7,320; Referees: Carl Jungebrand, Petr Sudek, Dubravko Muhvic

30 October 2002 4	Efes Pilsen (Turkish Basketball Federation)	91–92	(Spanish Basketball Federation) FC Barcelona	Istanbul
20:45	Scoring by quarter: 19–20, 14–15, 17–19, 23–19
	Pts: Kambala 41; Rebs: Kambala 11; Asts: Tunçeri 9 PIR: Kambala 37	Boxscore	Pts: Jasikevičius 17; Rebs: Fučka 10; Asts: three players 4 PIR: Fučka 20	Arena: Abdi İpekçi Arena; Attendance: 4,500; Referees: Iztok Rems, Stefano Cazzaro, Borys Ryzhyk

7 November 2002 5	FC Barcelona (Spanish Basketball Federation)	86–85	(Italian Basketball Federation) Benetton Treviso	Barcelona
20:30	Scoring by quarter: 16–23, 19–20, 32–25, 19–17
	Pts: Navarro 24; Rebs: Dueñas 11; Asts: Bodiroga 4 PIR: Dueñas 28	Boxscore	Pts: Bulleri 20; Rebs: Marconato 5 Asts: Edney 4 PIR: Edney 24	Arena: Palau Blaugrana; Attendance: 7,320; Referees: Armand De Keyser, Srdan Dozai, Saša Pukl

14 November 2002 6	Cibona VIP (Croatian Basketball Federation)	94–77	(Spanish Basketball Federation) FC Barcelona	Zagreb
20:45	Scoring by quarter: 26–12, 22–22, 30–16, 16–27
	Pts: Prkačin 21; Rebs: Mujezinović 10; Asts: Planinić 6 PIR: Prkačin 28	Boxscore	Pts: Navarro 25; Rebs: Bodiroga, Femerling 4 Asts: Rodríguez 5 PIR: Navarro 25	Arena: Dražen Petrović Basketball Hall; Attendance: 5,500; Referees: Kostas Koromilas, Efim Resser, Tolga Sahin

5 December 2002 7	FC Barcelona (Spanish Basketball Federation)	81–74	(German Basketball Federation) Alba Berlin	Barcelona
18:30	Scoring by quarter: 16–19, 25–23, 21–12, 19–20
	Pts: Fučka 15; Rebs: Dueñas 11; Asts: Jasikevičius, Navarro 2 PIR: Fučka 15	Boxscore	Pts: Demirel 22; Rebs: Stanojević 6 Asts: Lollis 2 PIR: Demirel 24	Arena: Palau Blaugrana; Attendance: 7,320; Referees: Stelios Koukoulekidis, Pascal Dorizon, Ivan Zachara

11 December 2002 8	Skipper Bologna (Italian Basketball Federation)	82–70	(Spanish Basketball Federation) FC Barcelona	Bologna
20:45	Scoring by quarter: 23–17, 20–22, 25–19, 14–12
	Pts: Delfino 21; Rebs: Delfino 11; Asts: Pozzecco 9 PIR: Delfino 25	Boxscore	Pts: Fučka, Navarro 19; Rebs: Fučka 8 Asts: Jasikevičius 2 PIR: Fučka 21	Arena: PalaDozza; Attendance: 5,000; Referees: Stavros Tsanidis, Petr Sudek, Richard Stokes

18 December 2002 9	FC Barcelona (Spanish Basketball Federation)	68–54	(Hellenic Basketball Federation) AEK Athens	Barcelona
20:30	Scoring by quarter: 19–15, 12–15, 18–13, 19–11
	Pts: Bodiroga 15; Rebs: Fučka 8 Asts: Jasikevičius 5 PIR: Dueñas 15	Boxscore	Pts: Betts, Dikoudis 13; Rebs: Betts 9 Asts: Blakney, Zisis 2 PIR: Betts 18	Arena: Palau Blaugrana; Attendance: 5,500; Referees: Danko Radic, Jose Araujo, Goran Urukalo

9 January 2003 10	Pau-Orthez (French Federation of Basketball)	72–84	(Spanish Basketball Federation) FC Barcelona	Pau
20:00	Scoring by quarter: 19–21, 20–26, 12–22, 21–15
	Pts: Sellers 20; Rebs: Sellers 6 Asts: Diaw 6 PIR: Diaw 21	Boxscore	Pts: Jasikevičius 20; Rebs: Bodiroga, Femerling 7 Asts: Jasikevičius 6 PIR: Jasikevičius 22	Arena: Palais des Sports de Pau; Attendance: 7,200; Referees: Fabio Facchini, Milivoje Jovcic, Luigi Lamonica

16 January 2003 11	FC Barcelona (Spanish Basketball Federation)	73–60	(Turkish Basketball Federation) Efes Pilsen	Barcelona
20:45	Scoring by quarter: 21–18, 17–17, 10–12, 25–13
	Pts: Jasikevičius 23; Rebs: Dueñas 8 Asts: Bodiroga 4 PIR: Bodiroga 22	Boxscore	Pts: Granger 17; Rebs: Kambala 7 Asts: Tunçeri 6 PIR: Kambala 14	Arena: Palau Blaugrana; Attendance: 7,000; Referees: Nikolaos Pitsilkas, Ilija Belošević, Moshe Bitton

30 January 2003 12	Benetton Treviso (Italian Basketball Federation)	94–82	(Spanish Basketball Federation) FC Barcelona	Villorba
20:30	Scoring by quarter: 26–14, 24–23, 22–20, 22–25
	Pts: Nicola 17; Rebs: Garbajosa 9 Asts: Pittis 7 PIR: Pittis 24	Boxscore	Pts: Jasikevičius 20; Rebs: de la Fuente 6 Asts: Bodiroga 3 PIR: Jasikevičius 22	Arena: Palaverde; Attendance: 5,038; Referees: Romualdas Brazauskas, Stelios Koukoulekidis, Dubravko Muhvic

5 February 2003 13	FC Barcelona (Spanish Basketball Federation)	104–82	(Croatian Basketball Federation) Cibona VIP	Barcelona
20:45	Scoring by quarter: 28–20, 30–13, 27–25, 19–24
	Pts: Jasikevičius, Navarro 17; Rebs: Varejão 8 Asts: Jasikevičius 5 PIR: Bodiroga 20	Boxscore	Pts: Mujezinović 17; Rebs: Prkačin 7 Asts: Mamić, Prkačin 3 PIR: Prkačin 18	Arena: Palau Blaugrana; Attendance: 7,320; Referees: Goran Radonjic, Nikos Mpotitsis, Borys Ryzhyk

12 February 2003 14	Alba Berlin (German Basketball Federation)	66–80	(Spanish Basketball Federation) FC Barcelona	Berlin
18:30	Scoring by quarter: 14–22, 12–23, 21–13, 19–22
	Pts: Stanojević 30; Rebs: Stanojević 10; Asts: Collins 6 PIR: Stanojević 34	Boxscore	Pts: Bodiroga 21; Rebs: Varejão 12; Asts: three players 4 PIR: Bodiroga 28	Arena: Max-Schmeling-Halle; Attendance: 6,101; Referees: Carl Jungebrand, Stavros Tsanidis, Shmuel Bachar

=== Top 16 ===
==== Group G ====
Pos	Team	Pld	W	L	PF	PA	PD	Qualification
1	(Spain) FC Barcelona	6	5	1	448	424	+24	Advance to Final Four
2	(Greece) Olympiacos	6	3	3	427	419	+8	
3	(Slovenia) Union Olimpija	6	3	3	445	438	+7	
4	(France) ASVEL	6	1	5	436	475	−39	

Source: Euroleague

==== Matches ====
27 February 2003 1	FC Barcelona (Spanish Basketball Federation)	85–77	(French Federation of Basketball) ASVEL Basket	Barcelona
20:30	Scoring by quarter: 24–19, 18–17, 22–16, 21–25
	Pts: Bodiroga 23; Rebs: Dueñas 12; Asts: Bodiroga 5 PIR: Bodiroga 31	Boxscore	Pts: Frigout 16; Rebs: Evtimov 10; Asts: Smith 3 PIR: Evtimov 18	Arena: Palau Blaugrana; Attendance: 7,320; Referees: Danko Radic, Nikolaos Zavlanos, Dale Aitcheson

6 March 2003 2	Union Olimpija (Basketball Federation of Slovenia)	72–69	(Spanish Basketball Federation) FC Barcelona	Ljubljana
20:30	Scoring by quarter: 17–18, 28–11, 13–23, 14–17
	Pts: Ilievski, Jurak 14; Rebs: Modrić 8 Asts: Baždarić 5 PIR: Ilievski, Modrić 12	Boxscore	Pts: Bodiroga 20; Rebs: de la Fuente 7 Asts: Jasikevičius 3 PIR: Bodiroga 19	Arena: Tivoli Hall; Attendance: 4,100; Referees: Nikolaos Pitsilkas, Stelios Koukoulekidis, Shmuel Bachar

20 March 2003 3	FC Barcelona (Spanish Basketball Federation)	80–77	(Hellenic Basketball Federation) Olympiacos	Barcelona
20:30	Scoring by quarter: 18–24, 20–20, 24–24, 18–9
	Pts: Bodiroga 20; Rebs: Dueñas 9 Asts: Jasikevičius 6 PIR: Bodiroga 22	Boxscore	Pts: Evans 21; Rebs: Evans 8 Asts: Tomić 4 PIR: Evans 18	Arena: Palau Blaugrana; Attendance: 7,320; Referees: Stefano Cazzaro, Dubravko Muhvic, Luigi Lamonica

27 March 2003 4	ASVEL Basket (French Federation of Basketball)	68–77	(Spanish Basketball Federation) FC Barcelona	Villeurbanne
20:30	Scoring by quarter: 14–22, 18–16, 18–17, 18–22
	Pts: Owens 16; Rebs: Evtimov 8 Asts: Smith 4 PIR: Evtimov 15	Boxscore	Pts: Jasikevičius 23; Rebs: Fučka 10; Asts: Jasikevičius 5 PIR: Fučka 31	Arena: Astroballe; Attendance: 4,588; Referees: Iztok Rems, Stavros Tsanidis, Borys Ryzhyk

10 April 2003 5	Olympiacos (Hellenic Basketball Federation)	55–58	(Spanish Basketball Federation) FC Barcelona	Piraeus
20:00	Scoring by quarter: 11–19, 17–16, 15–10, 12–13
	Pts: Marković 21; Rebs: Evans 8 Asts: Boudouris 3 PIR: Marković 18	Boxscore	Pts: Fučka 17; Rebs: Fučka 12; Asts: de la Fuente, Jasikevičius 2 PIR: Fučka 29	Arena: Korydallos Sports Hall; Attendance: 2,500; Referees: Stefano Cazzaro, Pascal Dorizon, Shmuel Bachar

17 April 2003 6	FC Barcelona (Spanish Basketball Federation)	79–75	(Basketball Federation of Slovenia) Union Olimpija	Barcelona
20:30	Scoring by quarter: 27–23, 17–17, 22–16, 13–19
	Pts: Bodiroga 21; Rebs: de la Fuente 7 Asts: three players 2 PIR: Bodiroga 22	Boxscore	Pts: Ilievski 16; Rebs: Boisa, Jurak 5 Asts: Štelmahers 5 PIR: Ilievski 20	Arena: Palau Blaugrana; Attendance: 7,320; Referees: Genaro Colucci, Ilija Belošević, Tolga Sahin

=== EuroLeague Final Four ===
9 May 2003 Semifinal	FC Barcelona (Spain)	76–71	(Russia) CSKA Moscow	Barcelona
20:30	Scoring by quarter: 21–25, 24–14, 12–21, 19–11
	Pts: Fučka 21; Rebs: Fučka 9 Asts: Bodiroga, Jasikevičius 4 PIR: Fučka 29	Report	Pts: Holden 21; Rebs: Khryapa 12; Asts: Alexander 3 PIR: Holden 15	Arena: Palau Sant Jordi; Attendance: 16,670; Referees: Nikolaos Pitsilkas, Iztok Rems, Ilija Belošević

11 May 2003 Final	FC Barcelona (Spain)	76–65	(Italy) Benetton Treviso	Barcelona
20:30	Scoring by quarter: 23–25, 19–9, 13–14, 21–17
	Pts: Bodiroga 20; Rebs: Bodiroga, de la Fuente 8 Asts: Bodiroga, Navarro 2 PIR: Bodiroga 27	Boxscore	Pts: Edney 16; Rebs: Marconato 7 Asts: Edney 5 PIR: Marconato 16	Arena: Palau Sant Jordi; Attendance: 16,670; Referees: Nikolaos Pitsilkas, Iztok Rems, Stelios Koukoulekidis

=== Copa del Rey ===
==== Quarterfinals ====
21 February 2003	FC Barcelona	72–59	Real Madrid	Valencia
20:30	Scoring by quarter: 16–12, 15–15, 21–14, 20–18
	Pts: Bodiroga 20; Rebs: Fučka 10; Asts: Jasikevičius 5 PIR: Bodiroga 25	Boxscore	Pts: Herreros 15; Rebs: Tarlać 7 Asts: Victoriano 4 PIR: Alston, Herreros 15	Arena: La Fonteta; Attendance: 8,500; Referees: Eduardo Sancha, Francisco De la Maza, José Ramón García Ortiz

==== Semifinals ====
22 February 2003	FC Barcelona	78–77	Unicaja	Valencia
20:30	Scoring by quarter: 19–16, 20–22, 14–24, 25–15
	Pts: Bodiroga 21; Rebs: Fučka 6 Asts: de la Fuente, Jasikevičius 3 PIR: Bodiroga 30	Boxscore	Pts: Bullock 19; Rebs: Kornegay, Okulaja 7 Asts: Risacher, Sonko 3 PIR: Okulaja 21	Arena: La Fonteta; Attendance: 8,500; Referees: Juan Carlos Mitjana, Francisco De la Maza, José Ramón García Ortiz

==== Final ====
23 February 2003	TAU Cerámica	78–84(OT)	FC Barcelona	Valencia
18:00	Scoring by quarter: 10–23, 14–11, 24–19, 21–16, Overtime: 9–15
	Pts: Bennett 18; Rebs: Scola 12; Asts: Bennett 4 PIR: Bennett 15	Boxscore	Pts: Dueñas 18; Rebs: Dueñas 17; Asts: Bodiroga 7 PIR: Dueñas 30	Arena: La Fonteta; Attendance: 8,500; Referees: Miguelo Betancor, José Antonio Martín Bertrán, Juan Antonio Requena

== Individual awards ==
=== Copa del Rey ===
Finals MVP

- (Federal Republic of Yugoslavia) Dejan Bodiroga

=== Liga ACB ===
ACB Finals MVP

- (Lithuania) Šarūnas Jasikevičius

Player of the Week

- (Spain) Roberto Dueñas – Week 4

=== EuroLeague ===
EuroLeague Final Four MVP

- (Federal Republic of Yugoslavia) Dejan Bodiroga

All-EuroLeague First Team

- (Federal Republic of Yugoslavia) Dejan Bodiroga

EuroLeague Finals Top Scorer

- (Federal Republic of Yugoslavia) Dejan Bodiroga
