= 2006 Copa del Rey de Baloncesto =

The Copa del Rey 2005-06 was the 70th edition of the Spanish basketball Cup. It was organized by the ACB and was disputed in Madrid in the Palacio de Deportes de la Comunidad de Madrid between the 16th and 19 February. The winning team was TAU Cerámica.

== Brackett ==
Quarterfinals; February 16 & 17		Semifinals; February 18		Final; February 19
Pamesa Valencia	82
Akasvayu Girona	68	Pamesa Valencia	87
Unicaja	74	Unicaja	74
Gran Canaria	64			Pamesa Valencia	80
TAU Cerámica	92			TAU Cerámica	85
DKV Joventut	72	TAU Cerámica	87
Real Madrid	77	Real Madrid	75
Winterthur Barcelona	67

=== Quarterfinals ===
February 16
18:30 GTM+1

Report

Pamesa Valencia (Valencian Community)	82–68	(Catalonia) Akasvayu Girona
Scoring by quarter: 19-15, 18-20, 25-15, 20-18
Pts: Avdalović 29; Rebs: Dikoudis 11; Asts: four players 2		Pts: McDonald 18; Rebs: Vázquez, Dueñas 5 Asts: López 2

Palacio de Deportes, Madrid
Attendance: 13,400
Referees: J.A. Martín Bertrán, Daniel Hierrezuelo, Redondo

February 16
21:00 GTM+1

Report

Unicaja (Andalusia)	74–64	(Canary Islands) Gran Canaria Grupo Dumas
Scoring by quarter: 17-16, 19-19, 21-11, 17-18
Pts: Garbajosa 22; Rebs: Garbajosa 6 Asts: Garbajosa 3		Pts: Savané, Norris 12; Rebs: Norris 6 Asts: Norris 7

Palacio de Deportes, Madrid
Attendance: 13,400
Referees: Juan Carlos Mitjana, Xavier Amorós, Oscar Perea

February 17
18:30 GTM+1

Report

TAU Cerámica (Basque Country (autonomous community))	92–72	(Catalonia) DKV Joventut
Scoring by quarter: 27-14, 17-22, 18-19, 30-17
Pts: Erdoğan 21; Rebs: Dávid, Hansen 7 Asts: Scola 8		Pts: Bartoň 16; Rebs: Archibald 5 Asts: Bennett 2

Palacio de Deportes, Madrid
Attendance: 13,400
Referees: M.A. Pérez Pérez, J.R. García Ortiz, E. Pérez Pizarro

February 17
21:00 GTM+1

Report

Real Madrid (Community of Madrid)	77–67	(Catalonia) Winterthur FC Barcelona
Scoring by quarter: 15-23, 18-18, 19-17, 25-9
Pts: Rakočević 22; Rebs: Reyes 8 Asts: Rakočević 4		Pts: Navarro 16; Rebs: Marconato 5 Asts: Navarro 7

Palacio de Deportes, Madrid
Attendance: 13,400
Referees: Juan Carlos Arteaga, Fco. De La Maza, Antonio Conde

=== Semifinals ===
February 18
17:00 GTM+1

Report

Pamesa Valencia (Valencian Community)	87–74	(Andalusia) Unicaja
Scoring by quarter: 22-21, 20-18, 23-17, 22-18
Pts: Timinskas 23; Rebs: Timinskas 11; Asts: Harrington 4		Pts: Herrmann 23; Rebs: Herrmann 5 Asts: Cabezas 6

Palacio de Deportes, Madrid
Attendance: 13,400
Referees: J.A. Martín Bertrán, Daniel Hierrezuelo, Redondo

February 18
19:30 GTM+1

Report

Real Madrid (Community of Madrid)	75–87	(Basque Country (autonomous community)) TAU Cerámica
Scoring by quarter: 15-19, 21-27, 16-23, 23-18
Pts: Bullock, Rakočević 13; Rebs: Reyes 9 Asts: Rakočević 3		Pts: Erdoğan 22; Rebs: Scola 9 Asts: Prigioni 8

Palacio de Deportes, Madrid
Attendance: 13,400
Referees: Juan Carlos Mitjana, M.A. Pérez Pérez, Antonio Conde

=== Final ===
February 19
19:00 GTM+1

Report

Pamesa Valencia (Valencian Community)	80–85	(Basque Country (autonomous community)) TAU Cerámica
Scoring by quarter: 8-29, 23-20, 21-17, 28-19
Pts: Dikoudis 26; Rebs: Dikoudis, Yebra 8 Asts: Harrington 4		Pts: Erdoğan 20; Rebs: Scola 9 Asts: Prigioni 15

Palacio de Deportes, Madrid
Attendance: 13,400
Referees: Juan Carlos Arteaga, Xavier Amorós, E. Pérez Pizarro

Copa del Rey 2006 Champions

TAU Cerámica
5th title

- MVP of the Tournament: Pablo Prigioni

== See also ==
- Liga ACB
- Copa del Rey de Baloncesto
