= 2003 Euroleague Final Four =

Basketball tournament

Tournament details
- Arena: Palau Sant Jordi; Barcelona, Spain
- Dates: May 9–11, 2003

Final positions
- Champions: (Spain) FC Barcelona (1st title)
- Runners-up: (Italy) Benetton Treviso
- Third place: (Italy) Montepaschi Siena
- Fourth place: (Russia) CSKA Moscow

Awards and statistics
- MVP: (Serbia and Montenegro) Dejan Bodiroga

The 2003 Euroleague Final Four was the concluding Euroleague Final Four tournament of the 2002–03 Euroleague season. The event was held from May 9 until May 11, 2003 and was hosted at the Palau Sant Jordi in Barcelona, Spain. FC Barcelona won their first Euroleague title in their hometown city after beating Montepaschi Siena in the championship game.

== Bracket ==
Semi-finals
May 9, Barcelona
(Italy) Montepaschi Siena	62
(Italy) Benetton Treviso	65
May 9, Barcelona
(Spain) FC Barcelona	76
(Russia) CSKA Moscow	71

Final
May 11, Barcelona
(Spain) FC Barcelona	76
(Italy) Benetton Treviso	65
Third place
May 11, Barcelona
(Italy) Montepaschi Siena	79
(Russia) CSKA Moscow	78

== Semifinals ==
9 May 2003
18:00

Report

Montepaschi Siena (Italy)	62–65	(Italy) Benetton Treviso
Scoring by quarter: 12–28, 11–11, 22–6, 17–20
Pts: V. Stefanov 17; Rebs: Kakiouzis 13; Asts: five players 1		Pts: Garbajosa 14; Rebs: Garbajosa, Marconato 10; Asts: Edney 7

Palau Sant Jordi, Barcelona
Attendance: 16,670
Referees: Betancor (ESP), Koukoulekidis (GRE), Martín Bertrán (ESP)

9 May 2003
20:30

Report

FC Barcelona (Spain)	76–71	(Russia) CSKA Moscow
Scoring by quarter: 21–25, 24–14, 12–21, 19–11
Pts: Fučka 21; Rebs: Fučka 9 Asts: Bodiroga, Jasikevičius 4		Pts: Holden 21; Rebs: Khryapa 12; Asts: Alexander 3

Palau Sant Jordi, Barcelona
Attendance: 16,670
Referees: Pitsilkas (GRE), Rems (SLO), Belosevic (SCG)

== Third Place ==
11 May 2003
18:00

Report

Montepaschi Siena (Italy)	79–78	(Russia) CSKA Moscow
Scoring by quarter: 26–27, 26–24, 13–12, 14–15
Pts: Ford 19; Rebs: Türkcan 14; Asts: Türkcan 4		Pts: Songaila 15; Rebs: Holden, Khryapa 7 Asts: Holden 6

Palau Sant Jordi, Barcelona
Attendance: 16,670
Referees: Betancor (ESP), Muhvic (CRO), Jovcic (SCG)

== Final ==
11 May 2003
20:30

Report

FC Barcelona (Spain)	76–65	(Italy) Benetton Treviso
Scoring by quarter: 23–25, 19–9, 13–14, 21–17
Pts: Bodiroga 20; Rebs: Bodiroga, De la Fuente 8 Asts: Bodiroga, Navarro 2		Pts: Edney 16; Rebs: Marconato 7 Asts: Edney 5

Palau Sant Jordi, Barcelona
Attendance: 16,670
Referees: Pitsilkas (GRE), Rems (SLO), Koukoulekidis (GRE)

FC Barcelona	Benetton Treviso

Starters:			P	R	A
PG	13	(Lithuania) Šarūnas Jasikevičius	8	1	1
SG	14	(Spain) Rodrigo de la Fuente (C)	8	8	0
SF	10	(Serbia and Montenegro) Dejan Bodiroga	20	8	2
PF	7	(Italy) Gregor Fučka	17	6	1
C	12	(Spain) Roberto Dueñas	3	4	0
Reserves:			P	R	A
PG	5	(Spain) Nacho Rodríguez	2	2	0
C	6	(Spain) Alfons Alzamora	DNP		
PF	8	(Germany) Patrick Femerling	9	4	0
SF	9	(Spain) César Bravo	DNP		
SG	11	(Spain) Juan Carlos Navarro	5	0	2
C	16	(Brazil) Anderson Varejão	1	1	0
C	18	(Netherlands) Remon van de Hare	DNP		
Head coach:
(Serbia and Montenegro) Svetislav Pešić

2002–03 Euroleague
Champions

FC Barcelona
1st title

Starters:			P	R	A
PG	5	(United States) Tyus Edney	16	2	5
SG	6	(United States) Trajan Langdon	8	3	0
SF	7	(Italy) Riccardo Pittis	4	2	1
PF	15	(Spain) Jorge Garbajosa	9	5	1
C	8	(Italy) Denis Marconato	10	7	1
Reserves:			P	R	A
PF	4	(Argentina) Marcelo Nicola (C)	5	2	1
PG	9	(Italy) Massimo Bulleri	11	0	0
PF	10	(Croatia) Krešimir Lončar	0	0	0
SF	13	(Georgia (country)) Manuchar Markoishvili	2	0	0
SF	16	(Italy) Nick Eppehimer	DNP		
C	20	(Denmark) Thomas Soltau	DNP		
Head coach:
(Italy) Ettore Messina

== Awards ==
=== Euroleague Final Four MVP ===
- (Federal Republic of Yugoslavia) Dejan Bodiroga ( (Spain) FC Barcelona)

=== Euroleague Finals Top Scorer ===
- (Federal Republic of Yugoslavia) Dejan Bodiroga ( (Spain) FC Barcelona)
