= 2006–07 AEL Limassol BC season =

The 2006-07 AEL Limassol BC season was the team's 40th season. Athlitiki Enosi Lemesou (Greek: Αθλητική Ένωση Λεμεσού), often abbreviated as AEL (Greek: ΑΕΛ), is a Cypriot professional basketball club based in Limassol.

The team competed in the FIBA Eurocup Group H.

== Roster ==
Number	Name	Position	Height (m)
	(Cyprus) Efthymios Panayiotou	Forward	2.04
5	(United States) \ (Israel) Jeron Roberts	Forward	1.94
4	(Lithuania) Zydrunas Urbonas	Forward	1.98
6	(Serbia) Milutin Aleksic	Forward	1.98
10	(Cyprus) Giorgos Palalas	Playmaker	1.85
11	(Cyprus) Chrysostomos Chrystodoulou	Forward	1.98
12	(United States) Antonio Michael King	Guard	1.91
13	(Netherlands) Remon Van de Hare	Centre	2.22
14	(Cyprus) Christos Spyrou	Playmaker	1.83
15	(Poland) Mihal Hlebowicki	Forward	2.03
16	(United States) Ryan Randle	Center	2.06
	(Latvia) Igors Miglinieks	Coach	
