= Ferran Laviña =

Spanish basketball player

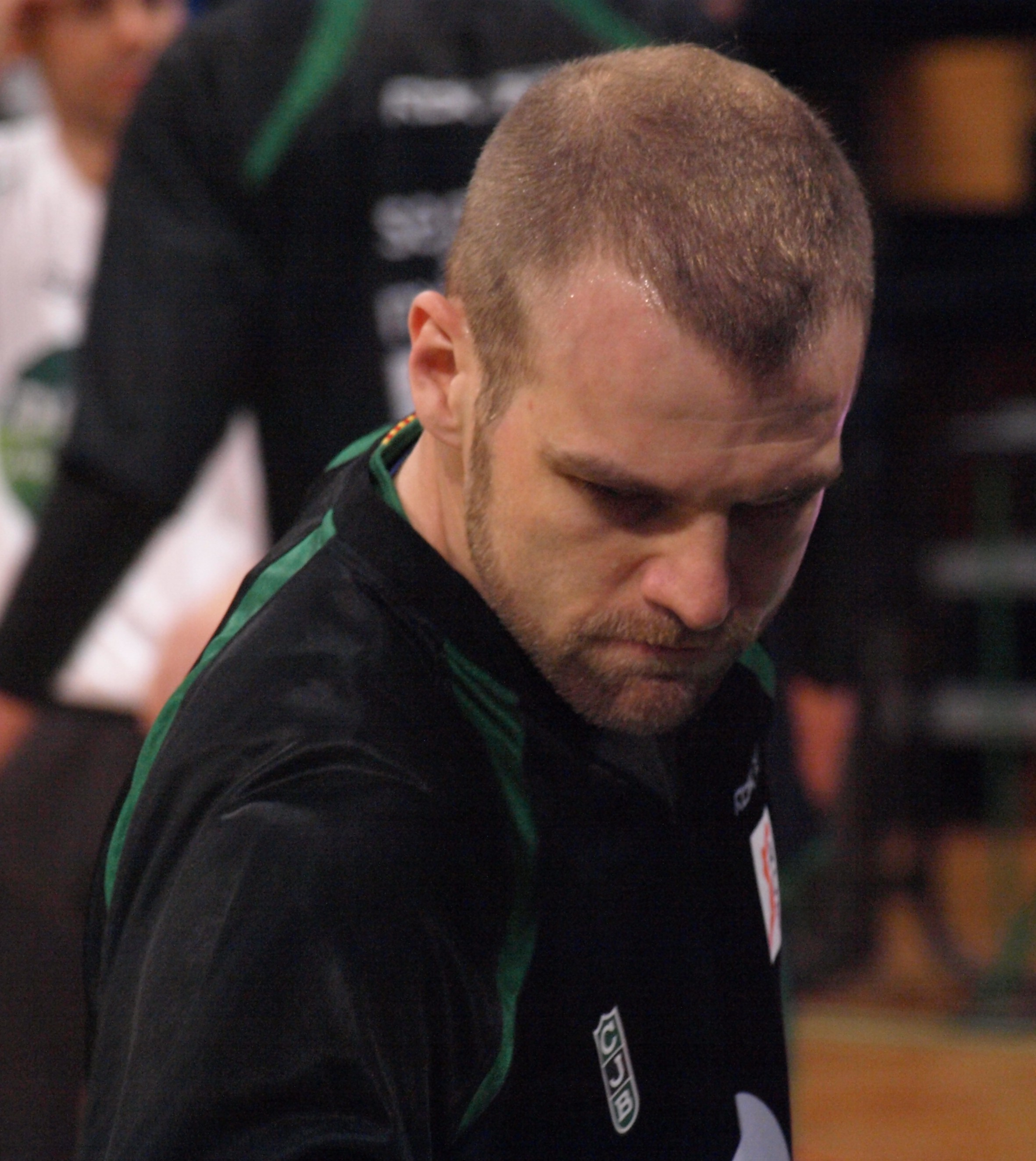
- Laviña with Joventut Badalona

Personal information
- Born: March 24, 1977 (age 49) L'Hospitalet, Spain
- Listed height: 1.92 m (6 ft 4 in)

Career information
- Playing career: 1994–2014
- Position: Small forward

Career history
- 1994–1995: CB L'Hospitalet
- 1995–1997: Bàsquet Manresa
- 1997–1998: Gijón Baloncesto
- 1998–2006: Bàsquet Manresa
- 2006–2009: Joventut Badalona
- 2009–2012: Baloncesto Fuenlabrada
- 2012, 2013: Bàsquet Manresa
- 2013–2014: FC Barcelona B

Ferran Laviña is a Spanish former professional basketball player.

== Trophies ==
=== With Joventut Badalona ===
- Copa del Rey: (1) 2008
- ULEB Cup: (1) 2008

== Euroleague statistics ==
| Year | Team | GP | GS | MPG | FG% | 3P% | FT% | RPG | APG | SPG | BPG | PPG | PIR |
|---|---|---|---|---|---|---|---|---|---|---|---|---|---|
| 2006–07 | DKV Joventut | 20 | 6 | 14.3 | .343 | .222 | .889 | 1.8 | .5 | .6 | .1 | 3.9 | 3.3 |
| 2008–09 | DKV Joventut | 10 | 4 | 18.9 | .452 | .300 | .733 | 1.9 | 1.1 | .3 | .1 | 5.5 | 3.9 |
| Career | | 30 | 10 | 15.8 | .384 | .255 | .833 | 1.8 | .7 | .5 | .1 | 4.4 | 3.5 |
