= Rodrigo de la Fuente =

Spanish basketball player (born 1976)

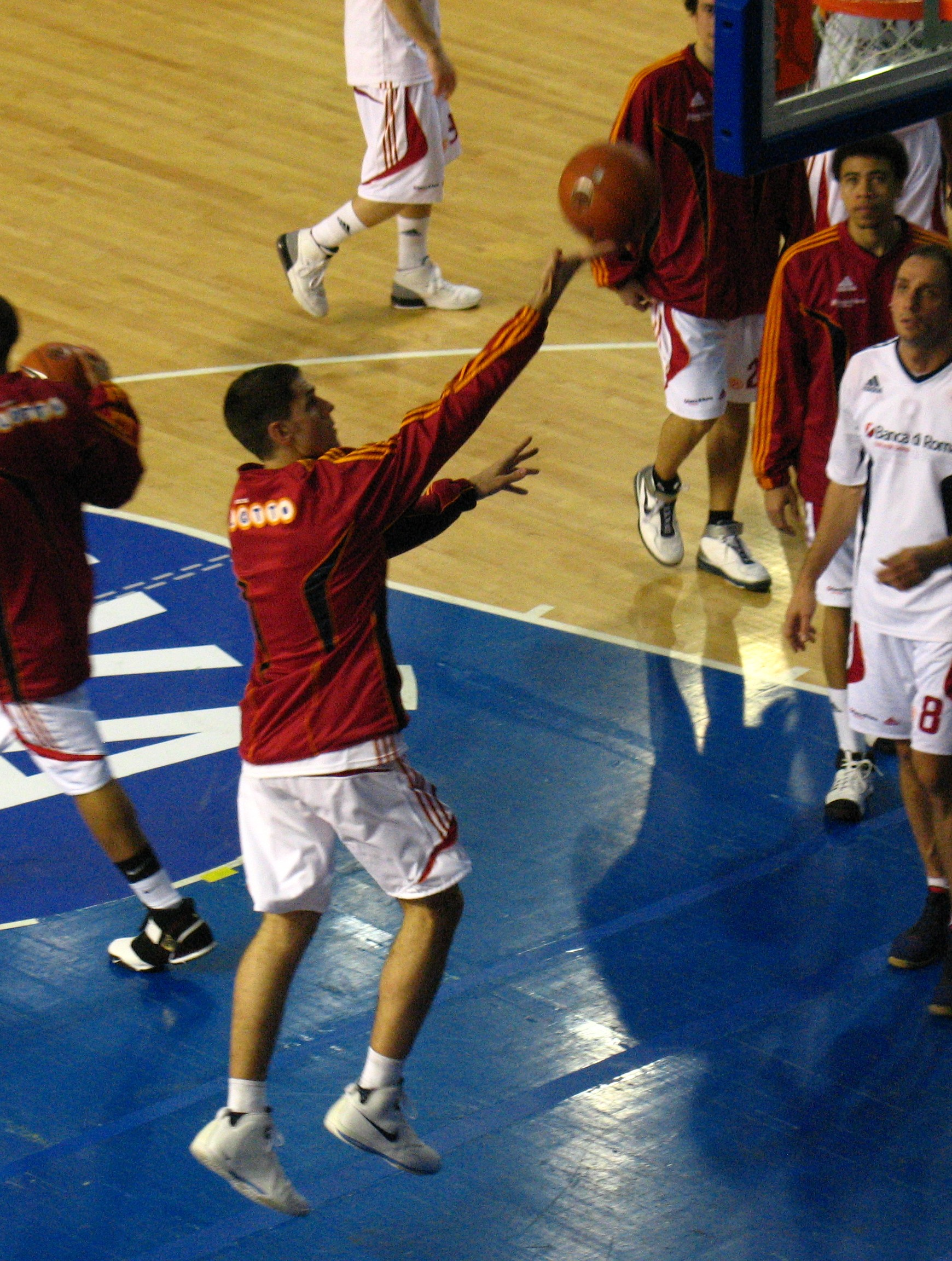

Personal information
- Born: November 26, 1976 (age 49) Madrid, Spain
- Listed height: 6 ft 7 in (2.01 m)
- Listed weight: 218 lb (99 kg)

Career information
- College: San Jacinto (1994–1996); Washington State (1996–1998)
- NBA draft: 1998: undrafted
- Playing career: 1998–2012
- Position: Small forward
- Number: 14

Career history
- 1998–2007: FC Barcelona
- 2007–2008: Benetton Treviso
- 2008–2010: Virtus Roma
- 2010–2011: Teramo Basket
- 2011–2012: Estudiantes

Career highlights
- Euroleague champion (2003)
Medals
Men's basketball
Representing Spain
European Championships
Silver medal – second place	1999 France	Spain
Silver medal – second place	2003 Sweden	Spain
FIBA Europe Under-18 Championship
Bronze medal – third place	1994 Israel	U-18 Team

Rodrigo de la Fuente Morgado (born 26 November 1976) is a retired Spanish professional basketball player and the current general manager of the basketball section of FC Barcelona.

== Professional career ==
A 6 ft 6 3/4 in (2.00 m) 220 lb (100 kg) small forward from Madrid, De la Fuente is a graduate of Washington State University. He won the Triple Crown in 2003 with FC Barcelona.

In 2007, after playing his entire professional career to date with FC Barcelona, De la Fuente, decided to leave the team and not renew his contract. After starting the 2010–11 season with Estudiantes Madrid, De la Fuente signed with Italian Teramo Basket in December 2010. He was the Captain of Barcelona in his latter days with the team.

In 2011, De la Fuente comes back to Asefa Estudiantes.

Rodrigo retired on June 13, 2013.

== After retirement ==
On 30 June 2016, De la Fuente signed as new general manager of FC Barcelona, replacing Joan Creus.
