= Patrick Femerling =

German basketball player (born 1975)

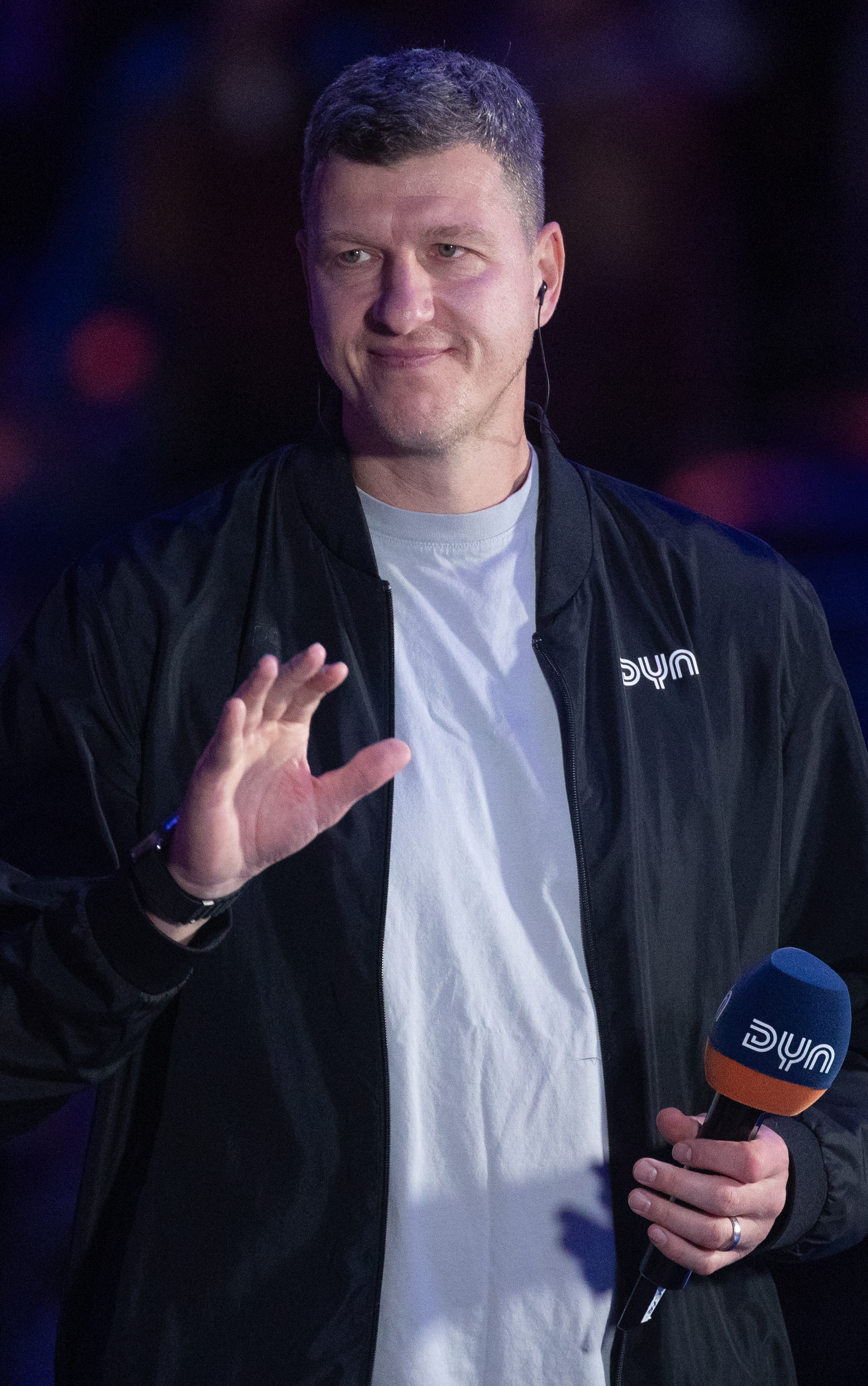
- Femerling in 2025

Personal information
- Born: 4 March 1975 (age 51) Hamburg, West Germany
- Listed height: 2.16 m (7 ft 1 in)
- Listed weight: 116 kg (256 lb)

Career information
- College: Washington (1995–1998)
- NBA draft: 1999: undrafted
- Playing career: 1998–2011
- Position: Center

Career history
- 1998–2000: ALBA Berlin
- 2000–2002: Olympiacos
- 2002–2004: Barcelona
- 2004–2006: Panathinaikos
- 2006–2007: Caja San Fernando
- 2007–2009: ALBA Berlin
- 2009–2010: Kepez Belediyesi
- 2010–2011: ALBA Berlin

Career highlights
- EuroLeague champion (2003)
Medals
Men's basketball
Representing Germany
World Championships
Bronze medal – third place	2002 USA	Germany
FIBA EuroBasket
Silver medal – second place	2005 Serbia and Montenegro	Germany

Patrick Oliver Femerling (born 4 March 1975) is a German former professional basketball player who played as a center.

== Professional career ==
Femerling was born in Hamburg. He played for ALBA Berlin in Germany and with them he won three German League championships (1999, 2000, 2008). From 2000 to 2002, he played for Olympiacos and with them he won the Greek Cup (2002). In 2003, Femerling won the EuroLeague championship while playing for FC Barcelona. He also won two Spanish League championships (2003, 2004), one Spanish King's Cup (2003), and one Spanish Supercup with FC Barcelona. He also played for Panathinaikos and with them he won two Greek League championships and two Greek Cups (2005, 2006).

== German national team ==
Femerling won the bronze medal at the 2002 FIBA World Championship and the silver medal at the 2005 FIBA European Championship while playing with the German national team.
