= ACB Finals Most Valuable Player =

Spanish basketball award

ACB Finals Most Valuable Player is an award for the top-tier professional basketball league in Spain, the Spanish ACB League. The ACB first named a Finals Most Valuable Player after the 1990–91 ACB season. Since then, only five players have won the award more than once: Arvydas Sabonis (2 times), Juan Carlos Navarro (3 times), Felipe Reyes (2 times), Sergio Llull (2 times), and Facundo Campazzo (2 times). Historically, the MVP of the ACB Finals usually goes to the player on the winning team that has the highest Performance Index Rating stat over the course of the Finals series.

== All-time award winners ==
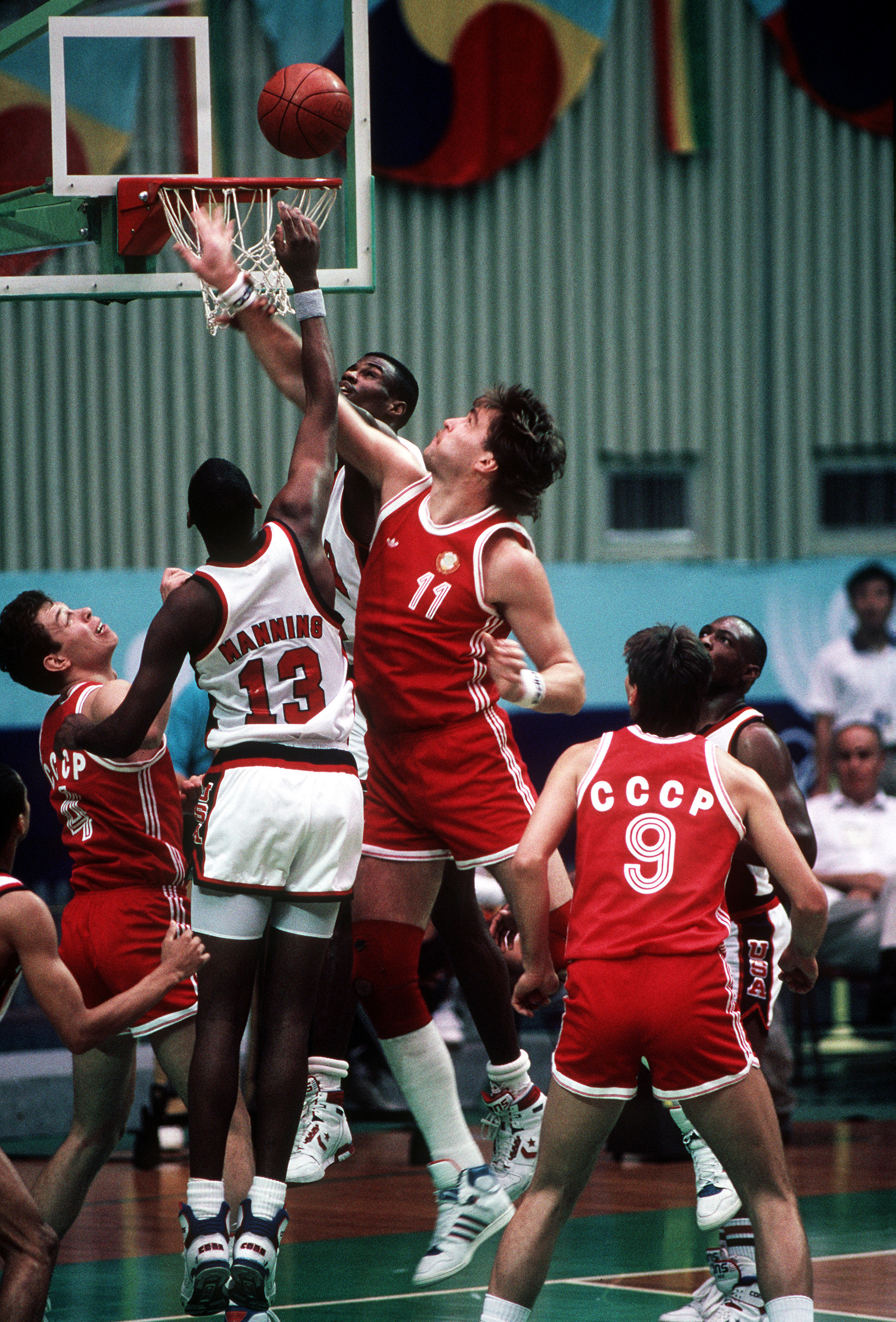
Arvydas Sabonis (#11 in red) was a 2 time Liga ACB Finals MVP (1993, 1994).

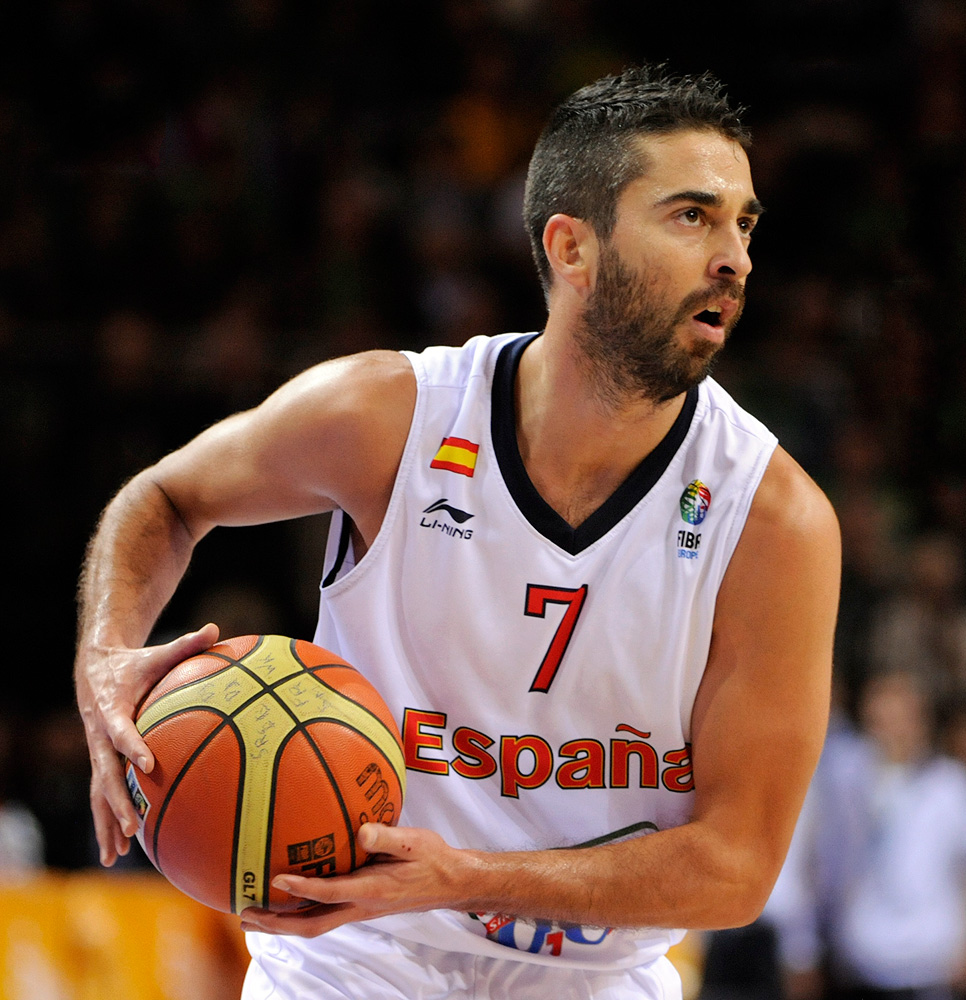
J.C. Navarro was a 3 time Liga ACB Finals MVP (2009, 2011, 2014).

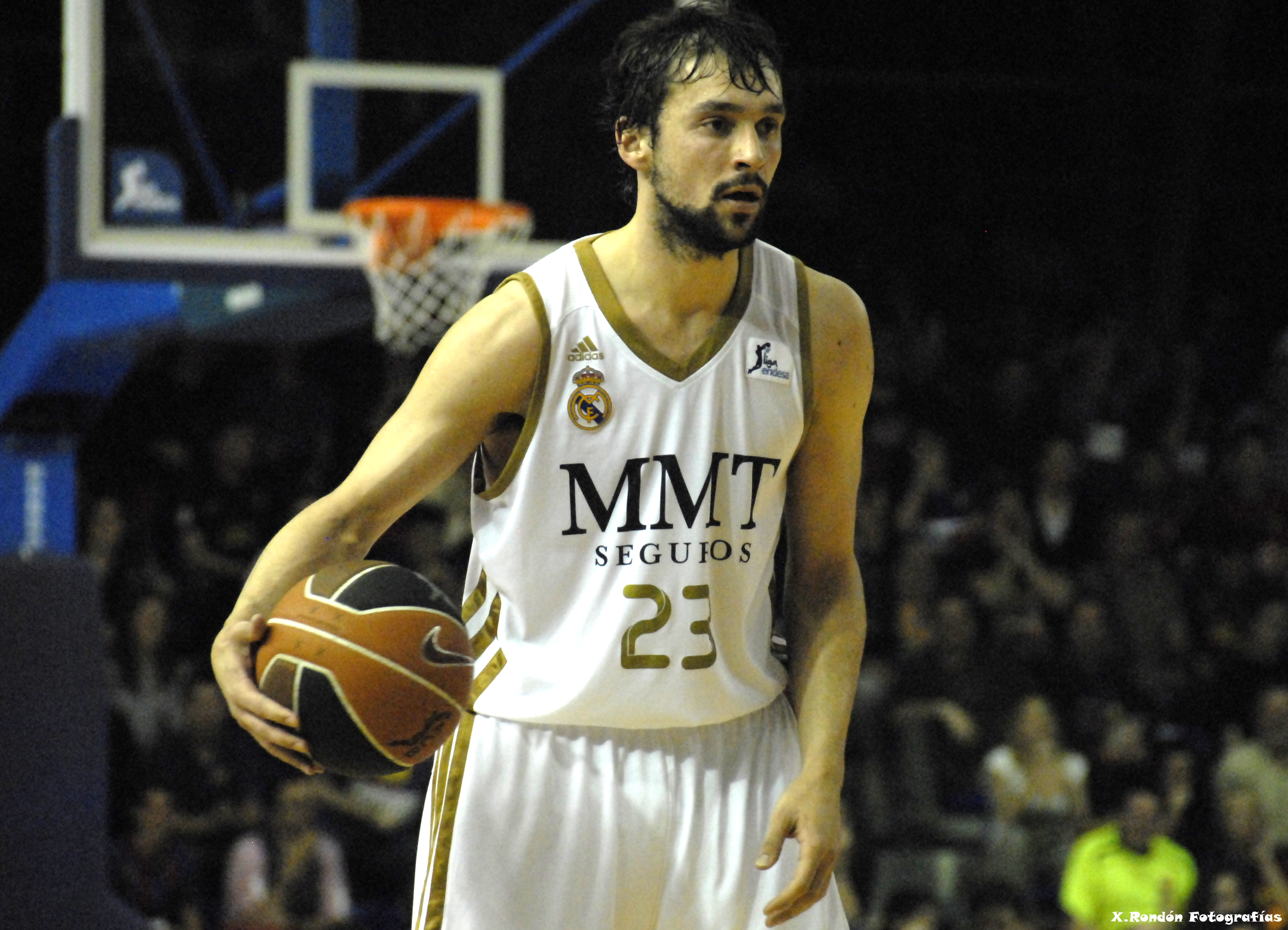
Sergio Llull was a 2 time Liga ACB Finals MVP (2015, 2016)

The following is a list of the all-time ACB Finals Most Valuable Player award winners.

- Player nationalities by national team.

Season	Player	Team
1990–91	(United States) Corny Thompson	Montigalá Joventut
1991–92	(Spain) Mike Smith	Montigalá Joventut (2×)
1992–93	(Lithuania) Arvydas Sabonis	Real Madrid Teka
1993–94	(Lithuania) Arvydas Sabonis (2×)	Real Madrid Teka (2×)
1994–95	(United States) Michael Ansley	Unicaja
1995–96	(Spain) Xavi Fernández	FC Barcelona Banca Catalana
1996–97	(Spain) Roberto Dueñas	FC Barcelona Banca Catalana (2×)
1997–98	(Spain) Joan Creus	TDK Manresa
1998–99	(United States) Derrick Alston	FC Barcelona (3×)
1999–00	(Spain) Alberto Angulo	Real Madrid Teka (3×)
2000–01	(Spain) Pau Gasol	FC Barcelona (4×)
2001–02	(United States) Elmer Bennett	TAU Cerámica
2002–03	(Lithuania) Šarūnas Jasikevičius	FC Barcelona (5×)
2003–04	(Serbia and Montenegro) Dejan Bodiroga	FC Barcelona (6×)
2004–05	(United States) Lou Bullock	Real Madrid (4×)
2005–06	(Spain) Jorge Garbajosa	Unicaja (2×)
2006–07	(Spain) Felipe Reyes	Real Madrid (5×)
2007–08	(United States) Pete Mickeal	TAU Cerámica (2×)
2008–09	(Spain) Juan Carlos Navarro	Regal FC Barcelona (7×)
2009–10	(Brazil) Tiago Splitter	Caja Laboral Baskonia (3×)
2010–11	(Spain) Juan Carlos Navarro (2×)	Regal FC Barcelona (8×)
2011–12	(Slovenia) Erazem Lorbek	FC Barcelona Regal (9×)
2012–13	(Spain) Felipe Reyes (2×)	Real Madrid (6×)
2013–14	(Spain) Juan Carlos Navarro (3×)	FC Barcelona (10×)
2014–15	(Spain) Sergio Llull	Real Madrid (7×)
2015–16	(Spain) Sergio Llull (2×)	Real Madrid (8×)
2016–17	(Montenegro) Bojan Dubljević	Valencia Basket
2017–18	(Spain) Rudy Fernández	Real Madrid (9×)
2018–19	(Argentina) Facundo Campazzo	Real Madrid (10×)
2019–20	(Argentina) Luca Vildoza	KirolBet Baskonia (4×)
2020–21	(Spain) Nikola Mirotić	FC Barcelona (11×)
2021–22	(Cape Verde) Edy Tavares	Real Madrid (11×)
2022–23	(Spain) Nikola Mirotić	FC Barcelona (12×)
2023–24	(Bosnia and Herzegovina) Dzanan Musa	Real Madrid (12×)
2024–25	(Argentina) Facundo Campazzo (2×)	Real Madrid (13×)
2025–26	(Dominican Republic) Jean Montero	Valencia Basket (2×)

== See also ==
- ACB Most Valuable Player Award
- All-ACB Team
- ACB Rising Star Award
