= 2001–02 ACB season =

2001-02 ACB season
- League: Liga ACB
- Sport: Basketball
- Games: 340
- Teams: 18
- TV partner: Canal+

Regular Season
- Season champions: FC Barcelona
- Season MVP: (United States) Tanoka Beard (DKV Joventut)

Playoffs

ACB Finals
- Champions: Tau Cerámica
- Runners-up: Unicaja Málaga
- Finals MVP: (United States) Elmer Bennett (Tau Cerámica)

ACB seasons
- ← 2000–01 2002–03 →

The 2001–02 ACB season was the 19th season of the Liga ACB.

== Regular season ==
| Pos | Team | GP | GW | GL | PA | PC | Qualification or relegation |
|---|---|---|---|---|---|---|---|
| 1 | FC Barcelona | 34 | 27 | 7 | 2960 | 2687 | Playoffs |
| 2 | Unicaja Málaga | 34 | 27 | 7 | 2782 | 2455 | Playoffs |
| 3 | Real Madrid | 34 | 24 | 10 | 2818 | 2577 | Playoffs |
| 4 | TAU Cerámica | 34 | 24 | 10 | 2764 | 2429 | Playoffs |
| 5 | Pamesa Valencia | 34 | 21 | 13 | 2681 | 2534 | Playoffs |
| 6 | Adecco Estudiantes | 34 | 20 | 14 | 2933 | 2771 | Playoffs |
| 7 | Jabones Pardo Fuenlabrada | 34 | 19 | 15 | 2675 | 2709 | Playoffs |
| 8 | Caprabo Lleida | 34 | 19 | 15 | 2764 | 2745 | Playoffs |
| 9 | DKV Joventut | 34 | 18 | 16 | 2858 | 2824 | |
| 10 | Fórum Valladolid | 34 | 17 | 17 | 2753 | 2738 | |
| 11 | Casademont Girona | 34 | 17 | 17 | 2587 | 2671 | |
| 12 | Caja San Fernando | 34 | 14 | 20 | 2608 | 2613 | |
| 13 | Leche Río Breogán | 34 | 13 | 21 | 2530 | 2731 | |
| 14 | CB Granada | 34 | 12 | 22 | 2809 | 2943 | |
| 15 | Cáceres CB | 34 | 11 | 23 | 2655 | 2933 | |
| 16 | Canarias Telecom | 34 | 10 | 24 | 2560 | 2786 | |
| 17 | Cantabria Lobos | 34 | 7 | 27 | 2623 | 2942 | Relegation to LEB |
| 18 | Gijón Baloncesto | 34 | 6 | 28 | 2564 | 2836 | Relegation to LEB |

== Playoffs ==
Quarter Finals
1 | FC Barcelona | 3
8 | Caprabo Lleida | 1
4 | Tau Cerámica | 3
5 | Pamesa Valencia | 1
2 | Unicaja Málaga | 3
7 | JP Fuenlabrada | 0
3 | Real Madrid | 2
6 | Adecco Estudiantes | 3

SemiFinals
1 | FC Barcelona | 1
4 | Tau Cerámica | 3
2 | Unicaja Málaga | 3
6 | Adecco Estudiantes | 0

Finals
2 | Unicaja Málaga | 0
4 | Tau Cerámica | 3

2001-02 ACB League
Tau Cerámica
1st Title

== See also ==
- Liga ACB
