= Elmer Bennett =

American basketball player (born 1970)

Personal information
- Born: February 13, 1970 (age 56) Evanston, Illinois, U.S.
- Listed height: 6 ft 0 in (1.83 m)
- Listed weight: 170 lb (77 kg)

Career information
- High school: Bellaire (Bellaire, Texas)
- College: Notre Dame (1988–1992)
- NBA draft: 1992: 2nd round, 38th overall pick
- Drafted by: Atlanta Hawks
- Playing career: 1992–2008
- Position: Point guard
- Number: 12, 5, 6, 14

Career history
- 1992: Rochester Renegade
- 1992–1993: Grand Rapids Hoops
- 1993–1994: Fargo-Moorhead Fever
- 1994–1995: Oklahoma City Cavalry
- 1995: Cleveland Cavaliers
- 1995: Victoria Libertas Pesaro
- 1995: Philadelphia 76ers
- 1995–1996: Oklahoma City Cavalry
- 1996: CRO Lyon Basket
- 1996: Houston Rockets
- 1997: Denver Nuggets
- 1997: Oklahoma City Cavalry
- 1997–2003: TAU Cerámica
- 2003–2005: Real Madrid
- 2005–2007: Joventut Badalona
- 2008: Sevilla

Career highlights
- FIBA EuroCup champion (2006); 2× Spanish League champion (2002, 2005); 2× Spanish King's Cup winner (1999, 2002); Spanish League Finals MVP (2002); All-Spanish League Team (2004); Spanish King's Cup MVP (1999); CBA champion (1997); CBA Finals MVP (1997); Third-team Parade All-American (1988); Texas Mr. Basketball (1988)
- Stats at NBA.com
- Stats at Basketball Reference

Elmer James Bennett (born February 13, 1970) is an American former professional basketball player. At a height of 6 ft 0 in (1.83 m), he played at the point guard position.

== High school ==
Bennett played competitively for Bellaire High School, in Bellaire, Texas.

== College career ==
Bennett played college basketball at the University of Notre Dame, with the Fighting Irish, from 1988 to 1992.

== Professional career ==
Bennett was selected by the Atlanta Hawks, in the second round (38th overall) of the 1992 NBA draft. Bennett played in 21 career games in the NBA, in a span of three seasons. He averaged 2.3 points per game over his NBA career.

Bennet played with Rochester Renegade, the Grand Rapids Hoops, the Fargo-Moorhead Fever and the Oklahoma City Cavalry in the Continental Basketball Association. His first European club was in Italy, as he played with Victoria Libertas Pesaro in 1995. He also played with CRO Lyon Basket in 1996.

Bennett played most of his professional career in Spain. He landed in TAU Cerámica in 1997 and stayed there until 2003. He then played with Real Madrid, DKV Joventut and Cajasol Sevilla. Among his accomplishments are featured the 2001–02 Spanish League title with TAU Cerámica, two Spanish King's Cups with TAU also in 1999 (named also MVP) and 2002, another league in 2004–05 with Real Madrid and the 2005–06 FIBA EuroCup with DKV Joventut.
