= Denis Marconato =

Italian basketball player

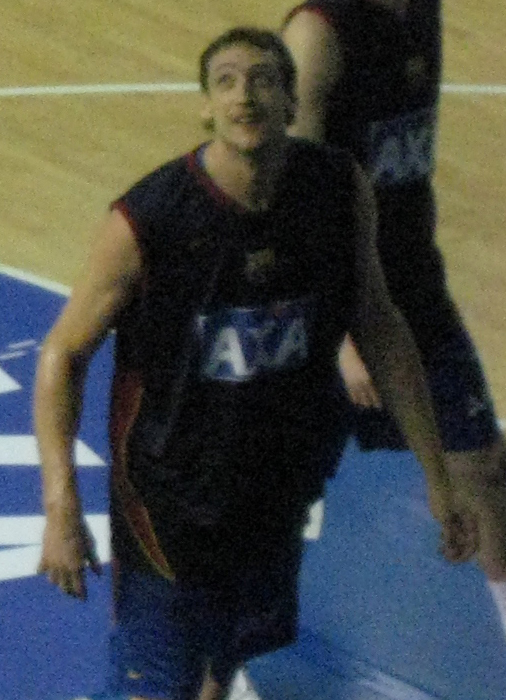
- Marconato warming up for the second game of the 2008 Spanish ACB League Finals

Personal information
- Born: 29 July 1975 (age 51) Treviso, Italy
- Listed height: 6 ft 11 in (2.11 m)
- Listed weight: 293 lb (133 kg)

Career information
- Playing career: 1993–2016
- Position: Center

Career history
- 1993–1995: Benetton Treviso
- 1995–1996: Floor Padova
- 1996–2005: Benetton Treviso
- 2005–2008: Barcelona
- 2008–2009: San Sebastián Gipuzkoa
- 2009: Olimpia Milano
- 2009–2010: Montepaschi Siena
- 2010–2012: Pallacanestro Cantù
- 2012–2013: Reyer Venezia Mestre
- 2014: Pallacanestro Cantù
- 2015–2016: Montichiari
- 2016: Dinamo Sassari

Career highlights
- FIBA European Selection Team (1998); 2× FIBA Saporta Cup champion (1995, 1999); Spanish Cup winner (2007); 4× Italian League champion (1997, 2002, 2003, 2010); 8× Italian Cup winner (1993–1995, 2000, 2003–2005, 2010); 4× Italian SuperCup winner (1997, 2001, 2002, 2009); Italian Cup MVP (2000); Italian SuperCup MVP (1997); Italian 3rd Division Cup winner (2015); 3× Italian Junior Club champion (1991, 1992, 1994); Order of Merit of the Italian Republic (2004)
Medals
Men's basketball
Representing Italy
Summer Olympic Games
Silver medal – second place	Athens 2004
FIBA EuroBasket
Silver medal – second place	1997 Spain
Gold medal – first place	1999 France
Bronze medal – third place	2003 Sweden

Denis Marconato (born 29 July 1975) is an Italian former professional basketball player. At a height of 2.11 m (6 ft 11 in) tall, he played at the center position.

== Professional career ==
Marconato joined Benetton Treviso's youth team in 1990, and with them he won three Italian juniors club titles between 1991 and 1994. In 1993, he made his debut in Italy's top-tier level men's professional LBA, with the senior team of Benetton Treviso, in the 1992–93 season. However, he did not have a regular place on Treviso's roster, so he was loaned to Padova, where he demonstrated his talent. In the 1996–97 season, he returned to Benetton Treviso, where the team's head coach Mike D'Antoni, gave him a more important role in the team; and in that season, Marconato won his first Italian League championship. After winning the Italian SuperCup title and MVP in 1997, and the FIBA Saporta Cup title in 1999, he was named the MVP of the Italian Cup Final Eight in 2000 (which was won by Treviso).

In the following years, he won two more Italian championships (2002, 2003), three more Italian Cups (2003, 2004, 2005) and played at two EuroLeague Final Fours (2002, 2003). During his last season with Treviso, Marconato was also the captain of the team. In the summer of 2005, he moved to the Spanish ACB League club FC Barcelona, together with his senior Italian national team teammate Gianluca Basile. On 14 January 2015 he signed with Montichiari of the Italian 3rd Division.

== National team career ==
Marconato played at the 1994 FIBA Europe Under-20 Championship with the Italian under-20 junior national team, and he also played at the 1996 FIBA Europe Under-22 Championship, which was held in Istanbul. After that, he was a regular member of the senior Italian national team, with which he won a gold medal at the 1999 EuroBasket, a bronze medal at the 2003 EuroBasket, and a silver medal at the 2004 Athens Summer Olympic Games. In addition, Marconato was also a member of the Italian roster at the 2006 FIBA World Championship.

== Honors and awards ==
=== Junior club career ===
- 3× Italian Junior Club Champion: (1991, 1992, 1994)

=== Pro career ===
- 8× Italian Cup Winner: (1993, 1994, 1995, 2000, 2003, 2004, 2005, 2010)
- 2× FIBA Saporta Cup Champion: (1995, 1999)
- 4× Italian League Champion: (1997, 2002, 2003, 2010)
- 4× Italian SuperCup Winner: (1997, 2001, 2002, 2009)
- 4× EuroLeague Final Four Participant: (1998, 2002, 2003, 2006)
- FIBA European Selection Team: (1998)
- Spanish Cup Winner: (2007)
- Italian 3rd Division Cup Winner: (2015)

=== Italian senior national team ===
- FIBA EuroBasket 1997: Silver
- FIBA EuroBasket 1999: Gold
- FIBA EuroBasket 2003: Bronze
- 2004 Summer Olympic Games: Silver

=== Individual awards ===
- Italian Super Cup MVP: (1997)
- Italian Cup MVP: (2000)
- Officer of the Order of Merit of the Italian Republic - Rome, 27 September 2004. The initiative of the President of the Republic.
