= Remon van de Hare =

Dutch basketball player

Personal information
- Born: 23 May 1982 (age 44) Amsterdam, Netherlands
- Listed height: 2.22 m (7 ft 3 in)
- Listed weight: 155 kg (342 lb)

Career information
- NBA draft: 2003: 2nd round, 52nd overall pick
- Drafted by: Toronto Raptors
- Playing career: 2000–2009
- Position: Center

Career history
- 2000–2005: FC Barcelona
- 2005–2006: Union Olimpija
- 2006–2007: AEL Limassol
- 2007–2008: Azovmash Mariupol
- 2008–2009: AEK Larnaca B.C.
- 2009: UE Mataró

Career highlights
- Euroleague champion (2003); 2x Spanish League champion (2003, 2004); Ukrainian League champion (2008); Ukrainian Cup champion (2008); Cypriot League champion (2007); 2x Slovenian Supercup champion (2005, 2006)
- Stats at Basketball Reference

Remon van de Hare (born 23 May 1982) is a Dutch former professional basketball player. He is 7 ft 3.25 in (2.2162 m) tall and played as center. He was picked in the second round of the 2003 NBA draft by the Toronto Raptors, but never played a game in the NBA. Van de Hare was also a member of the Dutch national basketball team in 2008. Van de Hare retired on 31 December 2009.
