= Roberto Dueñas =

Spanish basketball player

Personal information
- Born: 1 November 1975 (age 51) Madrid, Spain
- Listed height: 7 ft 3 in (2.21 m)
- Listed weight: 301.4 lb (137 kg)

Career information
- NBA draft: 1997: 2nd round, 57th overall pick
- Drafted by: Chicago Bulls
- Playing career: 1994–2007
- Position: Center

Career history
- 1994–1995: Fuenlabrada
- 1995–1996: CB Cornellà
- 1996–2005: FC Barcelona
- 2005–2006: CB Girona
- 2006–2007: Joventut Badalona
- 2007: CB Prat
- 2007: Joventut Badalona

Career highlights
- EuroLeague champion (2003); 6× Spanish League champion (1996, 1997, 1999, 2001, 2003, 2004); Spanish League Finals MVP (1997); 2× Spanish King's Cup winner (2001, 2003); Spanish Supercup winner (2004); Korać Cup champion (1999); No. 12 retired by FC Barcelona
- Stats at Basketball Reference

Roberto Dueñas Hernandez (born 1 November 1975) is a retired Spanish professional basketball player. At a height of 7 feet 3 inches (2.21 m) tall, he played at the center position.

== Professional career ==
Dueñas was drafted with the last overall pick (#57), of the 1997 NBA draft, by the Chicago Bulls, but he never played in the NBA.

Dueñas played professionally with FC Barcelona from 1996 to 2005, during which time he won a EuroLeague championship in the 2002–03 season. In honor of his play with Barcelona, his #12 jersey number was retired.

== Spain national team ==
Dueñas was a member of the senior Spain national basketball team. He played at the 2000 Summer Olympics and the 2004 Summer Olympics with Spain.
