= Louis Bullock =

American basketball player (born 1976)

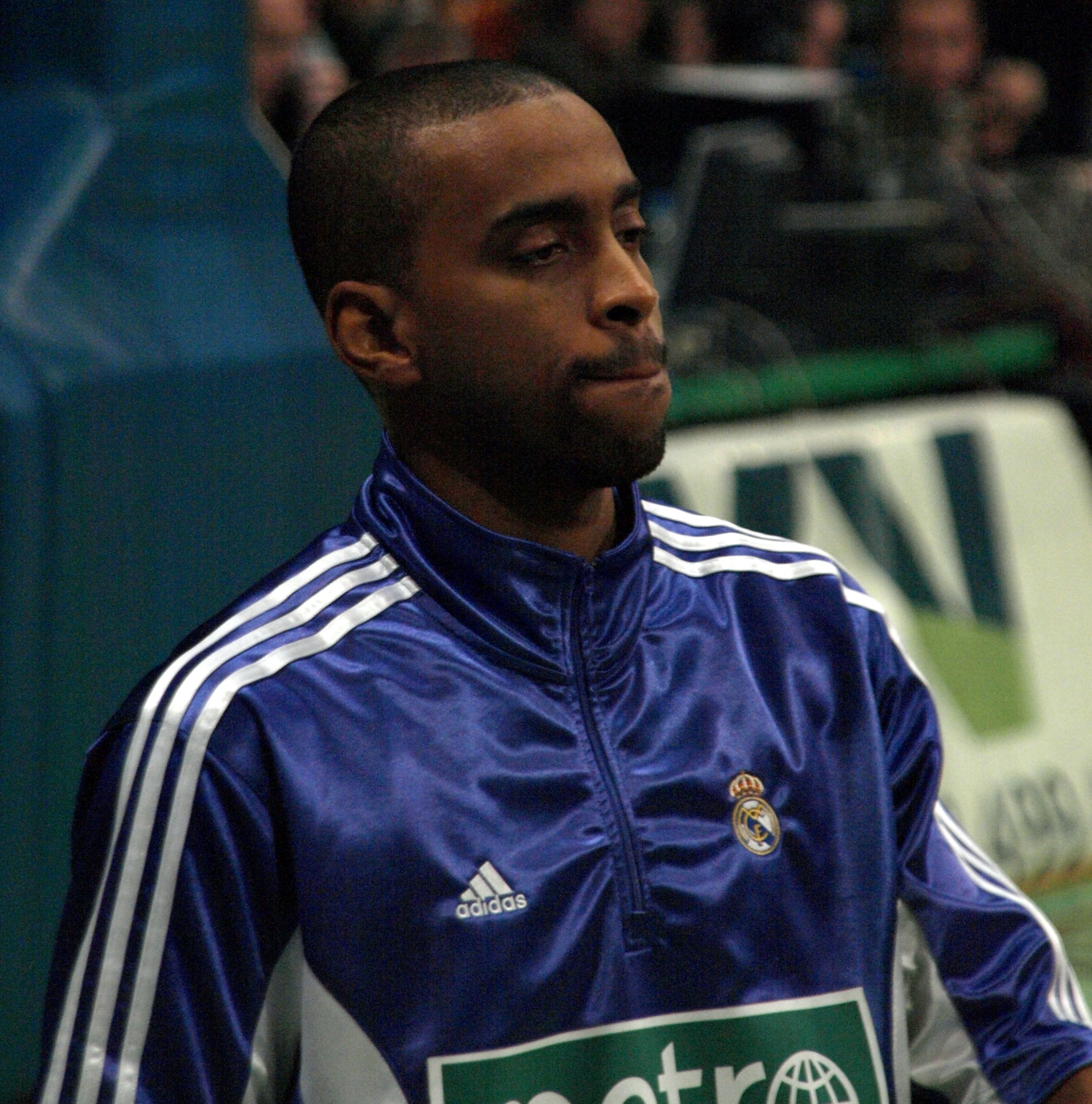
- Bullock warming up with Real Madrid, in 2008.

Personal information
- Born: May 20, 1976 (age 50) Washington, D.C., U.S.
- Listed height: 6 ft 1 in (1.85 m)
- Listed weight: 180 lb (82 kg)

Career information
- High school: Laurel Baptist Academy (Laurel, Maryland)
- College: Michigan (1995–1999)
- NBA draft: 1999: 2nd round, 42nd overall pick
- Drafted by: Minnesota Timberwolves
- Playing career: 1999–2012
- Position: Shooting guard

Career history
- 1999–2001: Müller Verona
- 2001–2002: Olimpia Milano
- 2002–2004: Unicaja Málaga
- 2004–2010: Real Madrid
- 2010–2011: Cajasol Sevilla
- 2012: Estudiantes

Career highlights
- All-EuroLeague First Team (2001); EuroCup champion (2007); 2× Spanish League champion (2005, 2007); Spanish League Finals MVP (2005); 2× Liga ACB Free Throw Percentage leader (2007–2008); Italian League Top Scorer (2002); McDonald's All-American (1995); Second-team Parade All-American (1995)
- Stats at Basketball Reference

Louis "Lou" Bullock Jr. (born May 20, 1976) is an American former professional basketball player.

Although his records have officially been vacated, due to the University of Michigan basketball scandal, his vacated records are unsurpassed for most single-season three-point field goals and career free throws in Michigan Wolverines men's basketball. In 2011, Jon Diebler surpassed his career three point total, for the Big Ten Conference record.

== High school ==
From Maryland, outside of Washington, D.C., Bullock first gained national attention at the now defunct Canterbury Preparatory School (in Accokeek, Maryland) before transferring his senior year to Laurel Baptist. In 1995, he was named Washington Post All Met Basketball Player of the Year, and he averaged 25.7 points, 8.7 rebounds, 8.4 assists and 3.0 steals per game. He was also a McDonald's All-American (where he won the three-point contest) and was widely considered one of the nation's top 30 prospects for that year. The McDonald's All-American three-point contest that Bullock won was brought back to the media when ESPN Classic's "Cheap Seats" re-aired it in an episode depicting the contest, as well as the 2003 NHL Skills competition. He chose the University of Michigan over numerous other schools, including Florida and Maryland.

== College career ==
At Michigan, Bullock would rank third on the school's all-time scoring list with 2,224 points, along with 299 assists, and 137 steals, but all of his and the team's accomplishments while he played have been wiped from the records books because of the University of Michigan basketball scandal in which he and three other Michigan players were given illicit loans by booster Ed Martin. He would be second in Big Ten Conference history in three-point field goals with 339, including a school record 101 in 1996. He also made 86.9% of his free throws during his career. His 505 free throws made is more than current record holder Cazzie Russell who had 486 but only played three seasons due to freshmen being ineligible during the time he played, or Manny Harris who had 484 but went to the NBA after his junior season. He held the school record for career minutes played until surpassed in 2012 by Zack Novak.

== Professional career ==
Bullock was selected 42nd overall in the 1999 NBA draft by the NBA club the Minnesota Timberwolves, and he was then traded to the Orlando Magic for cash considerations. He was signed by the Magic for the 1999 preseason, but he was waived before the regular season began and he never played in the NBA. He has played in Europe every season since his graduation from college. He spent three seasons in the Italian League with Müller Verona (1999–01) and with Olimpia Milano (2001–02). Bullock was the leading scorer of the Italian League, in the 2001–02 season, with a scoring average of 24.9 points per game.

He then moved to the Spanish ACB League in 2002, playing three seasons with Unicaja Málaga. In the 2003–04 season, he led the Spanish League in total three-pointers made, making 95 in 34 games. In 2004, Bullock signed with Real Madrid, where he won the Spanish league national championship title in 2005, and he was named the MVP of the league finals. With the Madrid club, he later also won the 2007 Spanish league title, and the 2007 EuroCup title. For the 2010–11 season, he then moved to CB Cajasol Sevilla, where he signed a one-year contract. In April 2012, he then signed with Asefa Estudiantes, until the end of the season.
