= Gregor Fučka =

Italian basketball player

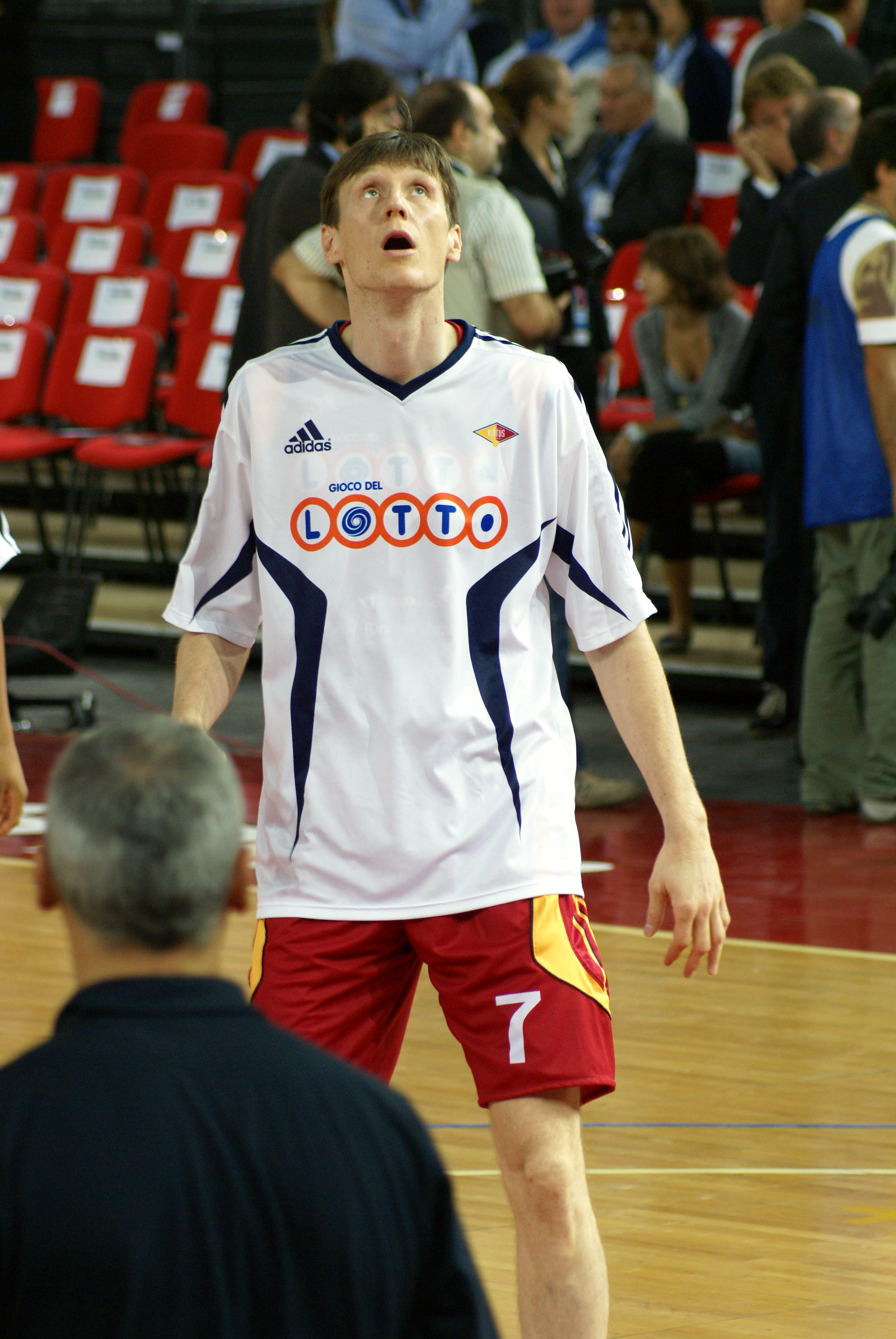
- Fučka warming up with Lottomatica Roma, in 2007.

Personal information
- Born: 7 August 1971 (age 55) Kranj, SR Slovenia, SFR Yugoslavia
- Listed height: 215 cm (7 ft 1 in)
- Listed weight: 111 kg (245 lb)

Career information
- NBA draft: 1993: undrafted
- Playing career: 1988–2011
- Position: Power forward / center
- Coaching career: 2017–present

Career history

Playing
- 1988–1990: Olimpija Ljubljana
- 1990–1994: Trieste
- 1994–1997: Olimpia Milano
- 1997–2002: Fortitudo Bologna
- 2002–2006: FC Barcelona
- 2006–2007: Girona
- 2007–2008: Virtus Roma
- 2008–2009: Fortitudo Bologna
- 2009–2011: Pistoia

Coaching
- 2017–2018: Trapani (assistant)
- 2017–2018: Italy under-14
- 2018-present: Fortitudo Bologna (academy)
- 2018-2019: Italy under-15
- 2018–2019: Italy under-16
- 2021: Bologna Basket 2016

Career highlights
- As a player: EuroLeague champion (2003); FIBA EuroChallenge champion (2007); 2× Italian League champion (1996, 2000); 2× Spanish League champion (2003, 2004); 2× Italian Cup winner (1996, 1998); Spanish Cup winner (2003); Italian Supercup winner (1998); Spanish Supercup winner (2004); 2× FIBA EuroStar (1997, 1999); FIBA EuroBasket MVP (1999); Mister Europa (2000); Euroscar (2000); All-EuroLeague First Team (2001); Italian All-Star Game MVP (2001); Acropolis Cup MVP (2001); EuroLeague records since the 2000–01 season: Most offensive rebounds in a game
Medals
Representing Italy
Men's Basketball
FIBA EuroBasket
Silver medal – second place	1997 Spain
Gold medal – first place	1999 France
European U-18 Championship
Gold medal – first place	1990 Netherlands	U-18 Team

Gregor Fučka (Slovene pronunciation: [ˈfutʃka]; born 7 August 1971) is a Slovenian-Italian former professional basketball player and coach. A 215 cm (7 ft 1 in) forward-center, he was a both a Mister Europa and Euroscar laureate in 2000.

== Professional career ==
Fučka played with Smelt Olimpija, in Yugoslavia, from 1988 to 1990. Subsequently, he moved to Italy, playing with Stefanel Trieste (1990–1994), Stefanel Milano (1994–1997), and Fortitudo Bologna (1997–2002). Afterwards, he played in Spain, with FC Barcelona (2002–2006), and with Akasvayu Girona (2006–07). He then came back to Italy, in the 2007–08 season, playing with Lottomatica Roma.

== National team career ==
Fučka was eligible to play for Italy as his father Žarko was born in Trieste and was a part of the Slovene community of Trieste before moving to Kranj. His father was a member of the Italian biathlon national team. Fučka played with Italy's junior national team at the 1991 FIBA Under-19 World Cup, where he won the silver medal. He also played at the FIBA Under-21 World Cup with Italy's junior national team, in 1993.

With the senior men's Italian national basketball team, Fučka played at the 2000 Summer Olympic Games, and he won the gold medal at the FIBA EuroBasket 1999, where he was named the tournament's MVP. Fučka also won a silver medal at the FIBA EuroBasket 1997. He also played at the 1998 FIBA World Championship (selected to the All-Tournament Team), and at the FIBA EuroBasket 1995 and the FIBA EuroBasket 2001.
