= 2002–03 Euroleague =

Sports season

- The Final Four was held in Palau Sant Jordi
- Season: 2002–03
- Games played: 220 (total)
- Teams: 24 (from 13 countries)

Finals
- Champions: (Spain) FC Barcelona (1st title)
- Runners-up: (Italy) Benetton Treviso
- Third place: (Italy) Montepaschi Siena
- Fourth place: (Russia) CSKA Moscow

Awards
- Regular Season MVP: (United States) Joseph Blair
- Top 16 MVP: (Turkey) Mirsad Türkcan
- Final Four MVP: (Serbia and Montenegro) Dejan Bodiroga

Statistical leaders
Points	(Federal Republic of Yugoslavia) Miloš Vujanić	25.8
Rebounds	(Turkey) Mirsad Türkcan	11.8
Assists	(United States) Ed Cota	6.5
Index Rating	(Turkey) Mirsad Türkcan	24.0

The 2002–03 Euroleague was the third season of the professional basketball competition for elite clubs throughout Europe, organised by Euroleague Basketball Company, and it was the 46th season of the premier competition for European men's clubs overall. The 2002–03 season featured 24 competing teams from 13 countries without qualifying rounds as FIBA organised its own top-tier competition and many teams competed in the 2002–03 FIBA Europe Champions Cup. The final of the competition was held in Palau Sant Jordi, Barcelona, Spain, with hosts FC Barcelona defeating Benetton Treviso 76–65.

== Team allocation ==
=== Distribution ===
The table below shows the default access list.

	Teams entering in this round
Regular season (24 teams)	17 teams with 3-year licences; 2 best-placed teams from: Spain; 1 best-placed team from: Greece; Italy; Poland; Yugoslavia; 1 Wild card.
Top 16 (16 teams)	3 group winners from the regular season; 3 group runners-up from the regular season; 3 group third-placed teams from the regular season; 3 group fourth-placed teams from the regular season; 3 group fifth-placed teams from the regular season; 1 group sixth placed team from the regular season
Final Four (4 teams)	4 group winners from the top 16

=== Teams ===
The labels in the parentheses show how each team qualified for the place of its starting round (TH: EuroLeague title holders)

- Licensed clubs: 3-year licence
- 1st, 2nd, etc.: League position after Playoffs
- WC: Wild card

Regular season
Licensed clubs
(France) ASVEL (1st)	(Spain) FC Barcelona (3rd)	(Israel) Maccabi Elite (1st)
(France) Pau-Orthez (2nd)	(Spain) Real Madrid (5th)	(Lithuania) Žalgiris (2nd)
(Greece) Olympiacos (2nd)	(Turkey) Efes Pilsen (1st)	(Russia) CSKA Moscow (5th)
(Greece) Panathinaikos (3rd)^{TH}	(Turkey) Ülker (2nd)	(Slovenia) Union Olimpija (1st)
(Italy) Benetton Treviso (1st)	(Croatia) Cibona VIP (1st)	(Federal Republic of Yugoslavia) Budućnost (2nd)
(Italy) Skipper Bologna (2nd)	(Germany) ALBA Berlin (1st)	
Associated clubs
(Italy) Kinder Bologna (3rd)	(Spain) Tau Cerámica (1st)	(Federal Republic of Yugoslavia) Partizan Mobtel (1st)
(Italy) Montepaschi Siena (5th)^{WC}	(Spain) Unicaja Málaga (2nd)	
(Greece) AEK (1st)	(Poland) Idea Śląsk (1st)	

== Regular season ==
The first phase was a regular season, in which the competing teams were drawn into three groups, each containing eight teams. Each team played every other team in its group at home and away, resulting in 14 games for each team in the first stage. The top 5 teams in each group and the best sixth-placed team advanced to the next round. The complete list of tiebreakers was provided in the lead-in to the Regular Season results.

If one or more clubs were level on won-lost record, tiebreakers were applied in the following order:

1. Head-to-head record in matches between the tied clubs
2. Overall point difference in games between the tied clubs
3. Overall point difference in all group matches (first tiebreaker if tied clubs were not in the same group)
4. Points scored in all group matches
5. Sum of quotients of points scored and points allowed in each group match

=== Group A ===
Pos	Team	Pld	W	L	PF	PA	PD	Qualification
1	(Italy) Benetton Treviso	14	11	3	1253	1108	+145	Advance to Top 16
2	(Spain) FC Barcelona	14	11	3	1137	1048	+89	Advance to Top 16
3	(Turkey) Efes Pilsen	14	8	6	1072	998	+74	Advance to Top 16
4	(Italy) Skipper Bologna	14	8	6	1085	1087	−2	Advance to Top 16
5	(Croatia) Cibona VIP	14	7	7	1066	1118	−52	Advance to Top 16
6	(France) Pau-Orthez	14	6	8	1076	1124	−48	
7	(Germany) Alba Berlin	14	4	10	1064	1172	−108	
8	(Greece) AEK	14	1	13	1000	1098	−98	

Source: Euroleague

=== Group B ===
Pos	Team	Pld	W	L	PF	PA	PD	Qualification
1	(Greece) Panathinaikos	14	11	3	1103	1039	+64	Advance to Top 16
2	(Spain) Tau Cerámica	14	9	5	1126	1090	+36	Advance to Top 16
3	(Slovenia) Union Olimpija	14	9	5	1105	1052	+53	Advance to Top 16
4	(Spain) Unicaja Málaga	14	7	7	1060	1058	+2	Advance to Top 16
5	(Israel) Maccabi Elite	14	7	7	1129	1081	+48	Advance to Top 16
6	(Italy) Montepaschi Siena	14	6	8	1132	1092	+40	Advance to Top 16
7	(Lithuania) Žalgiris	14	5	9	1141	1195	−54	
8	(Serbia and Montenegro) Budućnost	14	2	12	1108	1297	−189	

Source: Euroleague

=== Group C ===
Pos	Team	Pld	W	L	PF	PA	PD	Qualification
1	(Russia) CSKA Moscow	14	12	2	1148	1004	+144	Advance to Top 16
2	(Turkey) Ülker	14	10	4	1115	1064	+51	Advance to Top 16
3	(Greece) Olympiacos	14	7	7	1066	1041	+25	Advance to Top 16
4	(Italy) Virtus Bologna	14	6	8	1102	1119	−17	Advance to Top 16
5	(France) ASVEL	14	6	8	1114	1138	−24	Advance to Top 16
6	(Spain) Real Madrid	14	6	8	1094	1113	−19	
7	(Poland) Idea Śląsk Wrocław	14	5	9	1039	1125	−86	
8	(Serbia and Montenegro) Partizan Mobtel	14	4	10	1109	1183	−74	

Source: Euroleague

== Top 16 ==
The surviving teams were divided into four groups of four teams each, and again a round robin system was adopted, resulting in 6 games each, with the top team advancing to the Final Four. Tiebreakers were identical to those used in the Regular Season.

=== Group D ===
Pos	Team	Pld	W	L	PF	PA	PD	Qualification
1	(Russia) CSKA Moscow	6	5	1	499	399	+100	Advance to Final Four
2	(Turkey) Efes Pilsen	6	4	2	425	431	−6	
3	(Croatia) Cibona VIP	6	2	4	447	499	−52	
4	(Spain) Unicaja Málaga	6	1	5	474	516	−42	

Source: Euroleague

=== Group E ===
Pos	Team	Pld	W	L	PF	PA	PD	Qualification
1	(Italy) Montepaschi Siena	6	4	2	510	484	+26	Advance to Final Four
2	(Italy) Skipper Bologna	6	3	3	350	448	−98	
3	(Greece) Panathinaikos	6	3	3	482	506	−24	
4	(Turkey) Ülker	6	2	4	480	484	−4	

Source: Euroleague

=== Group F ===
Pos	Team	Pld	W	L	PF	PA	PD	Qualification
1	(Italy) Benetton Treviso	6	6	0	522	452	+70	Advance to Final Four
2	(Israel) Maccabi Elite	6	4	2	537	477	+60	
3	(Spain) Tau Cerámica	6	2	4	502	516	−14	
4	(Italy) Virtus Bologna	6	0	6	448	564	−116	

Source: Euroleague

=== Group G ===
Pos	Team	Pld	W	L	PF	PA	PD	Qualification
1	(Spain) FC Barcelona	6	5	1	448	424	+24	Advance to Final Four
2	(Greece) Olympiacos	6	3	3	427	419	+8	
3	(Slovenia) Union Olimpija	6	3	3	445	438	+7	
4	(France) ASVEL	6	1	5	436	475	−39	

Source: Euroleague

== Final four ==
The Final Four was played from 9 May until 11 May 2003 and was held in the Palau Sant Jordi in Barcelona.

Semifinals; 9 May
(Russia) CSKA Moscow	71
(Spain) FC Barcelona	76
(Italy) Montepaschi Siena	62
(Italy) Benetton Treviso	65

Final; 11 May
(Spain) FC Barcelona	76
(Italy) Benetton Treviso	65
Third place
(Russia) CSKA Moscow	78
(Italy) Montepaschi Siena	79

== Awards ==
=== Top Scorer ===
Player	Team
(Serbia and Montenegro) Miloš Vujanić	(Serbia and Montenegro) Partizan

=== Regular season MVP ===
Player	Team
(United States) Joseph Blair	(Turkey) Ülker

=== Top 16 MVP ===
Player	Team
(Turkey) Mirsad Türkcan	(Italy) Montepaschi Siena

=== Final Four MVP ===
Player	Team
(Serbia and Montenegro) Dejan Bodiroga	(Spain) FC Barcelona

=== Finals Top Scorer ===
Player	Team
(Serbia and Montenegro) Dejan Bodiroga	(Spain) FC Barcelona

=== All-Euroleague First Team ===
Player	Team
(United States) Tyus Edney	(Italy) Benetton Treviso
(United States) Alphonso Ford	(Italy) Montepaschi Siena
(Serbia and Montenegro) Dejan Bodiroga	(Spain) FC Barcelona
(Spain) Jorge Garbajosa	(Italy) Benetton Treviso
(United States) Victor Alexander	(Russia) CSKA Moscow

=== All-Euroleague Second Team ===
Player	Team
(Serbia and Montenegro) Miloš Vujanić	(Serbia and Montenegro) Partizan
(United States) Marcus Brown	(Turkey) Efes Pilsen
(Argentina) Andrés Nocioni	(Spain) Tau Cerámica
(Turkey) Mirsad Türkcan	(Italy) Montepaschi Siena
(Croatia) Nikola Vujčić	(Israel) Maccabi Elite

== Euroleague All-Stars ==
On 2 October 2002 Euroleague All-Star Team led by Tyus Edney defeated Real Madrid in exhibition game 91–85.

- Real Madrid – Euroleague All-Stars 85–91

Real Madrid (22+15+21+27): Michael Hawkins 2, Alberto Herreros 16, Angulo 7, Derrick Alston 6, Hernández-Sonseca 11; Digbeu 14, Dragan Tarlac 16, Victoriano 13, Macej Lampe, Nadeau.

Euroliga Stars(21+23+14+33): Tyus Edney 16, McDonald 9, Alvertis 2, Turkcan 2, Nicola 8; Kakiouzis 18, Luis Scola 8, Gregor Fucka 11, Navarro 3, Shelef 2, Vujcic 12, Weis; Coach: Zeljko Obradovic.

== See also ==
- 2002–03 FIBA Europe Champions Cup
