= Jorge Garbajosa =

Spanish basketball player (born 1977)

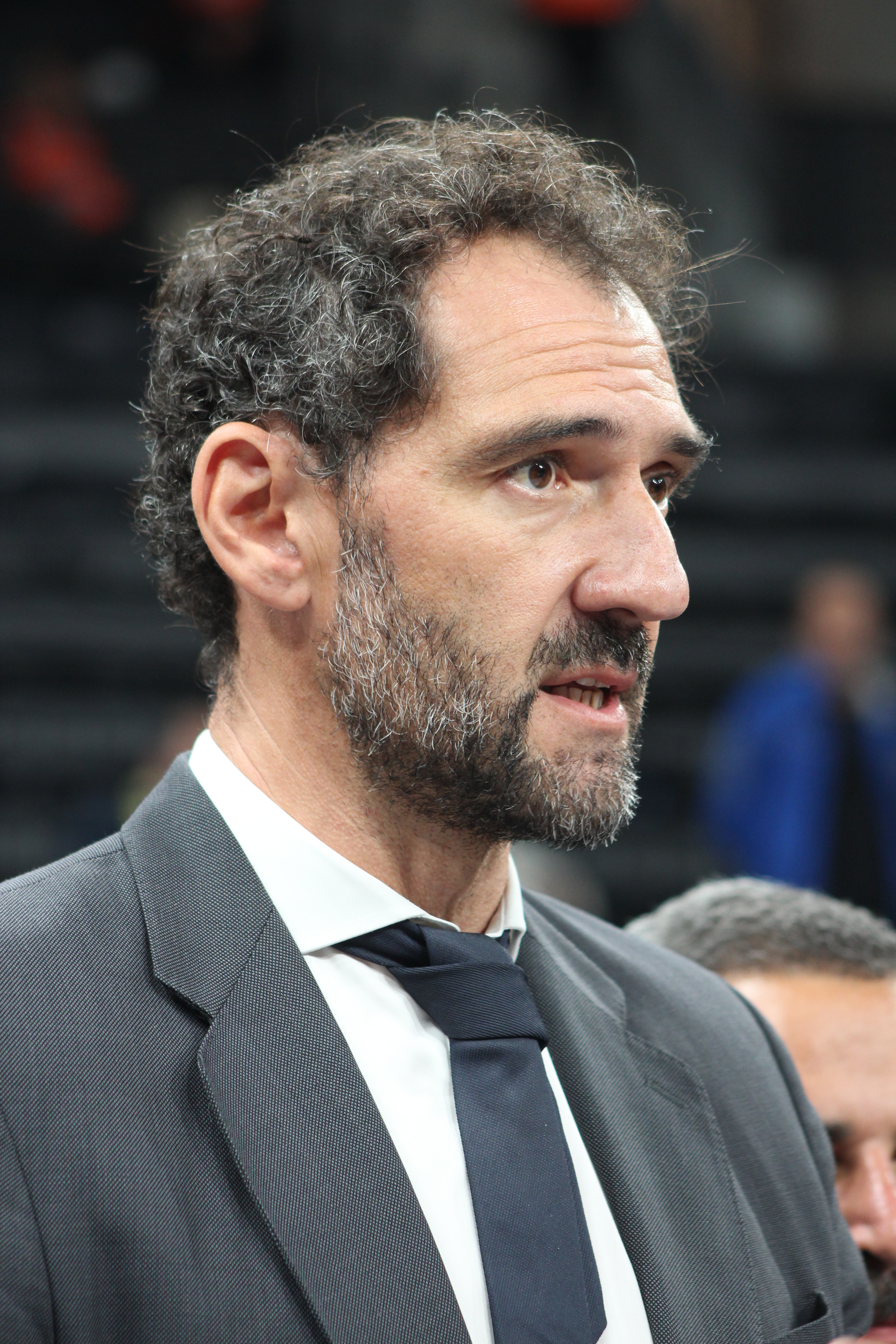
- Garbajosa in 2024

Personal information
- Born: 19 December 1977 (age 48) Torrejón de Ardoz, Spain
- Listed height: 6 ft 9 in (2.06 m)
- Listed weight: 245 lb (111 kg)

Career information
- NBA draft: 1999: undrafted
- Playing career: 1994–2012
- Position: Power forward
- Number: 7, 15

Career history
- 1994–2000: Taugrés/TAU Cerámica
- 2000–2004: Benetton Treviso
- 2004–2006: Unicaja
- 2006–2008: Toronto Raptors
- 2008–2009: Khimki Moscow Region
- 2009–2011: Real Madrid
- 2011–2012: Unicaja

Career highlights
- NBA All-Rookie First Team (2007); Mr. Europa (2006); All-EuroLeague First Team (2003); All-EuroLeague Second Team (2006); EuroLeague steals leader (2003); FIBA Saporta Cup champion (1996); Liga ACB champion (2006); 2× Spanish Cup winner (1999, 2005); Liga ACB Finals MVP (2006); 2× All-Liga ACB Team (2005, 2006); Spanish Cup MVP (2005); 2× LBA champion (2002, 2003); 2× Italian Cup winner (2003, 2004); 2× Italian Super Cup winner (2001, 2002); Italian Cup MVP (2004)
- Stats at NBA.com
- Stats at Basketball Reference
Medals
Men's basketball
Representing Spain
Event	1st	2nd	3rd
Olympic Games	0	1	0
FIBA World Cup	1	0	0
EuroBasket	1	2	1
Total	2	3	1
Summer Olympics
Silver medal – second place	2008 Beijing	
FIBA World Cup
Gold medal – first place	2006 Japan	
EuroBasket
Bronze medal – third place	2001 Turkey	
Silver medal – second place	2003 Sweden	
Silver medal – second place	2007 Spain	
Gold medal – first place	2009 Poland	

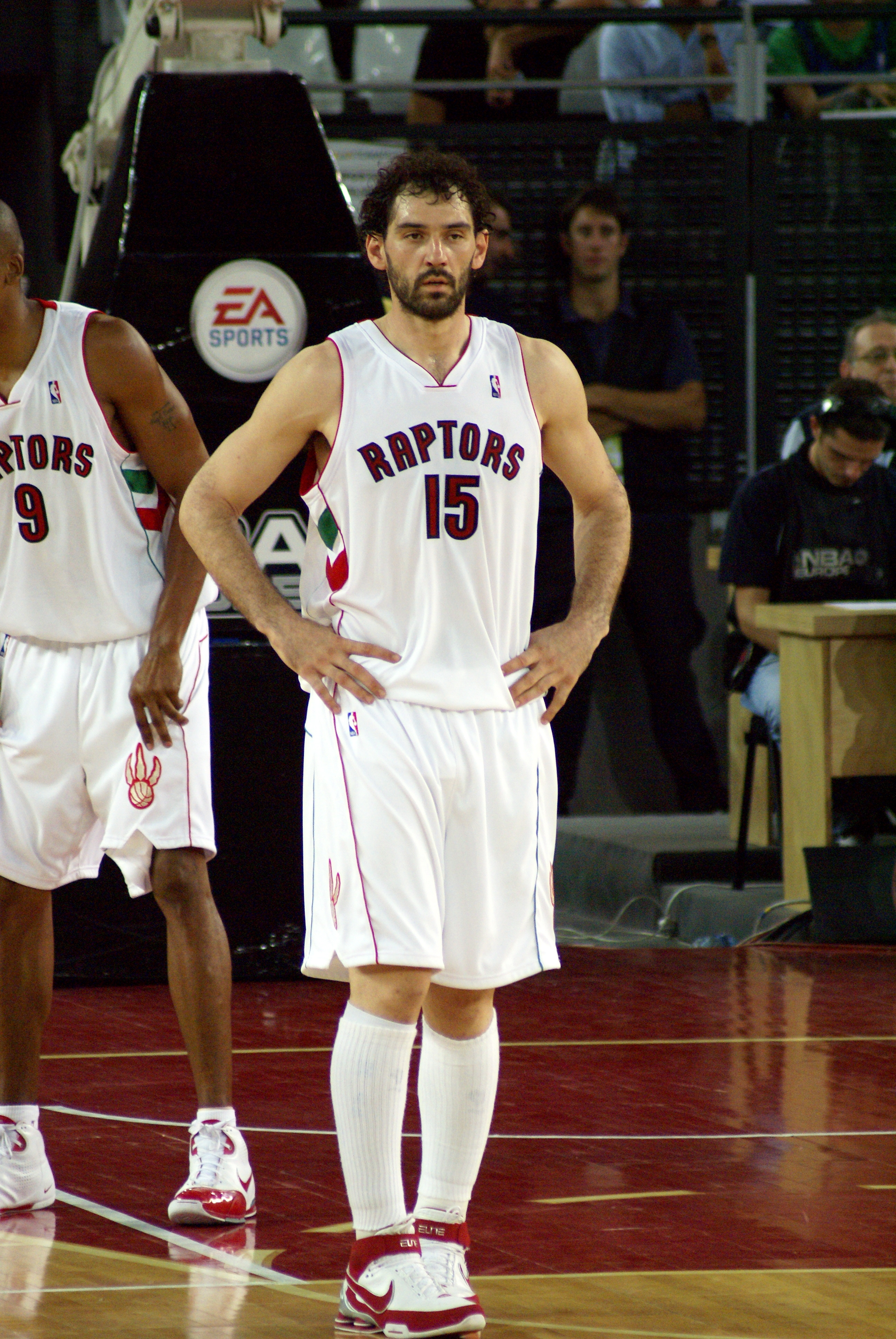
Garbajosa with the Toronto Raptors in 2007 during a preseason game in Italy

Jorge Garbajosa Chaparro (born 19 December 1977) is a Spanish former professional basketball player, the outgoing president of the Spanish Basketball Federation, and the current President of FIBA Europe. Standing at 2.07 m (6 ft 9 1/2 in), he played both power forward and small forward. He was an All-EuroLeague first team selection in 2003, and an All-EuroLeague second team selection in 2006, while playing for Unicaja. During his stint in the NBA, he was named to the NBA All-Rookie First Team in 2007. A serious injury the following season cut his NBA career short, and he never truly recovered until his retirement.

He played internationally with the senior Spain national team, which won a bronze medal at the EuroBasket 2001, two silver medals at the EuroBasket 2003 and 2007, and a gold medal at the EuroBasket 2009. During his tenure their highest achievement was the gold medal at the 2006 World Cup, where his stellar play earned him All-tournament honors. In 2006, Garbajosa was named Mr Europa Player of the year by Italian weekly magazine SuperBasket.

== Professional career ==
=== Europe ===
Garbajosa began his career playing for Taugrés, later known as TAU Cerámica, between 1995 and 2000. In the 1998–99 season, he guided Baskonia to a Spanish King's Cup victory.

Garbajosa then spent four seasons at Benetton Treviso between 2000 and 2004 under future Toronto Raptors Vice-President and Assistant General Manager Maurizio Gherardini and New York Knicks head coach Mike D'Antoni. He won two Italian National Cups, two Italian Super Cups and two Italian League championships with Benetton and averaged 13.8 points, 6.7 rebounds and a EuroLeague-best 2.85 steals per game, en route to All-EuroLeague 2002–03 First Team honors, and being named the 2003 Eurobasket.com Player of the Year.

Garbajosa spent his next two seasons (2004–06) with Unicaja, helping them to win the 2005–06 Spanish League championship and Spanish Cup. He was in the top 15 in scoring (14.9 points per game) and rebounding (6.9 rebounds per game) in the 2005–06 EuroLeague season, and averaged 13.3 points and 6.4 rebounds domestically, in 42 Spanish league outings, shooting 55% from the field and 81% from the free throw line. Garbajosa was also the 2005 Spanish Cup MVP, and the 2006 Spanish League Finals MVP, and earned All-EuroLeague Second Team honors.

Overall, in his 11 seasons with the three clubs, Garbajosa had regular-season averages of 10.4 points, 5.2 rebounds and 1.4 steals in 362 Spanish national domestic league games, and averaged 13.0 points, 6.3 rebounds and 1.8 steals in 105 EuroLeague games.

=== NBA ===
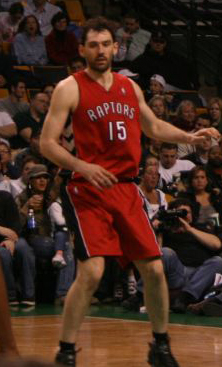
Garbajosa in his first season with the Toronto Raptors

On 24 July 2006, the Toronto Raptors officially signed Garbajosa to a three-year contract amounting to about US$12 million. He wore number 15 for the Raptors, previously worn by ex-Raptors star Vince Carter. Given his pedigree, Garbajosa was a regular starter at the forward position. For the first half of the season, Garbajosa was instrumental in driving the Raptors past the .500 mark and he was awarded Eastern Conference Rookie of the Month honours in December 2006.

On 26 March 2007, Garbajosa suffered an injury to his left leg during a regular-season matchup against the Boston Celtics. The injury was serious, as he was carried out on a stretcher in considerable pain. Doctors in Toronto performed surgery to repair a broken fibula, a displaced ankle and ligament damage. Because his recovery time was estimated to be in the range of six months, he was forced to miss the rest of the season and the entire post-season. He averaged 8.5 points and 4.9 rebounds per game after 67 appearances in his debut season for the Raptors. Garbajosa and Raptors teammate Andrea Bargnani were named to the NBA All-Rookie Team at the end of the season.

Garbajosa returned to play with the Raptors for the 2007–08 season, but after meeting with a specialist on 26 November, he chose to have further surgery on his leg and ankle. The operation took place on 11 December 2007.

In June 2008, negotiations took place in an attempt by the Raptors to buy out the remaining year of his contract. Garbajosa had previously been named to the 2008 Spanish Olympic basketball squad, against the wishes of the Raptors. On 18 June 2008, the Raptors officially bought out Garbajosa's contract.

While playing for the Raptors, his nickname was "The Garbage Man."

=== Return to Europe ===
In the 2008 off-season, Garbajosa signed a two-year, €6 million net income contract with the Russian Super League club Khimki Moscow Region, giving him one of the most expensive contracts in Europe. The next year, however, he was allowed to terminate his contract in order to return to Spain to sign with Real Madrid. The transfer was announced by the club after weeks of speculation on 15 August 2009. In 2011, Garbajosa and Real Madrid reached an agreement to rescind the player's contract. In March 2011, he signed with Unicaja. In May 2012, he decided to end his career.

== National team career ==
Garbajosa played internationally with the senior Spain national teams at two Summer Olympiads: the 2000 and 2004. He also won medals at two EuroBaskets: a bronze medal in 2001, and a silver medal in 2003.

On 3 September 2006, his team won the gold medal at the 2006 FIBA World Championship; he scored a game-high 20 points and collected 10 rebounds in the final against Greece. His tournament average was 12.6 points and 5.3 rebounds. In addition to winning the gold medal, Garbajosa made the All-Tournament team, along with teammate Pau Gasol.

On 1 January 2007, Garbajosa was named Mister Europa 2006, by Italian weekly magazine SuperBasket. Some of the other NBA players that have been given that award are Dirk Nowitzki (2005) and Pau Gasol (2004).

At the 2007 EuroBasket, Garbajosa was a key player for the Spanish team. He averaged 7.8 points per game and 3.1 rebounds per game, in nine games, but Spain lost 59–60 to the Russian national team in the final. He went on to win a silver medal at the 2008 Summer Olympic Games, and a gold medal at the 2009 EuroBasket.

== Post-retirement ==
On 9 July 2016, Garbajosa was appointed as President of the Spanish Basketball Federation. He was reelected to the position in 2020 as the only candidate.

On 20 May 2023, Garbajosa was elected as the new President of FIBA Europe by the general assembly with 35 out of 50 votes, succeeding Turgay Demirel for the following four years. He assumed the position immediately, giving him three months to call elections for the next President of the Spanish Basketball Federation. By virtue of being president of one of FIBA's zones, he is also a member of the FIBA Central Board and serves as one of its vice presidents.

== Career statistics ==
Legend
GP	Games played	GS	Games started	MPG	Minutes per game
FG%	Field-goal percentage	3P%	3-point field-goal percentage	FT%	Free-throw percentage
RPG	Rebounds per game	APG	Assists per game	SPG	Steals per game
BPG	Blocks per game	PPG	Points per game	PIR	Performance index rating
**Bold**	Career high

Led the league

=== EuroLeague ===
Year	Team	GP	GS	MPG	FG%	3P%	FT%	RPG	APG	SPG	BPG	PPG	PIR
2000–01	Benetton	15	13	24.6	**.621**	**.524**	.712	4.9	.9	1.3	.8	12.4	15.8
2001–02	Benetton	20	16	26.4	.466	.351	.823	5.9	1.1	2.0	.6	11.5	15.4
2002–03	Benetton	**22**	**21**	27.9	.429	.391	.756	6.7	1.2	**2.3**	.7	12.3	19.3
2003–04	Benetton	18	17	28.3	.519	.410	.714	5.8	1.1	1.7	.6	13.8	18.1
2004–05	Unicaja	13	12	32.9	.413	.348	.800	**7.8**	1.7	1.6	**.9**	14.0	**21.2**
2005–06	Unicaja	18	16	**35.2**	.411	.396	.771	6.9	**2.3**	1.8	.8	**14.9**	19.3
2009–10	Real Madrid	20	16	21.9	.455	.373	.786	4.0	1.1	.6	.2	8.2	9.8
2010–11	Real Madrid	11	1	16.2	.422	.345	.786	2.7	.3	.6	.5	5.4	6.5
2011–12	Unicaja	14	3	20.0	.353	.271	**1.000**	2.9	.9	.9	.2	6.2	6.8
Career		151	115	26.3	.538	.374	.772	5.4	1.2	1.5	.6	11.2	15.1

=== NBA ===
Year	Team	GP	GS	MPG	FG%	3P%	FT%	RPG	APG	SPG	BPG	PPG
2006–07	Toronto	**67**	**60**	**28.5**	**.420**	.342	**.731**	**4.9**	**1.9**	**1.2**	**.2**	**8.5**
2007–08	Toronto	7	0	10.6	.320	**.375**	.000	2.1	.4	.4	.0	3.1
Career		74	60	26.8	.415	.344	.731	4.7	1.7	1.1	.2	8.0

== See also ==
- List of National Basketball Association undrafted players
