= Slovakia men's national under-16 basketball team =

Slovak youth national team

Slovakia
- FIBA zone: FIBA Europe
- National federation: Slovak Basketball Association

U17 World Cup
- Appearances: None

U16 EuroBasket
- Appearances: None

U16 EuroBasket Division B
- Appearances: 19
- Medals: None
| Home | Away |

The Slovakia men's national under-16 basketball team is a national basketball team of Slovakia, administered by the Slovak Basketball Association. It represents the country in international under-16 men's basketball competitions.

== FIBA U16 EuroBasket participations ==
| Year | Result in Division B |
|---|---|
| 2005 | 6th |
| 2006 | 17th |
| 2007 | 13th |
| 2008 | 21st |
| 2009 | 12th |
| 2010 | 8th |
| 2011 | 22nd |
| 2012 | 19th |
| 2013 | 17th |
| 2015 | 4th |

| Year | Result in Division B |
|---|---|
| 2016 | 10th |
| 2017 | 23rd |
| 2018 | 20th |
| 2019 | 19th |
| 2022 | 19th |
| 2023 | 7th |
| 2024 | 6th |
| 2025 | 17th |
| 2026 | 10th |

== See also ==
- Slovakia men's national basketball team
- Slovakia men's national under-18 basketball team
- Slovakia women's national under-16 basketball team
