= 2025 FIBA U16 EuroBasket Division B =

International youth basketball tournament

Tournament details
- Host country: North Macedonia
- City: Skopje
- Dates: 7–16 August 2025
- Teams: 22 (from 1 confederation)
- Venues: 2 (in 1 host city)

Final positions
- Champions: Poland (3rd title)
- Runners-up: Belgium
- Third place: Czechia

Official website
- www.fiba.basketball

The 2025 FIBA U16 EuroBasket Division B was the 20th edition of the Division B of the European basketball championship for men's under-16 national teams. The tournament was played in Skopje, North Macedonia, from 7 to 16 August 2025.

== Participating teams ==
- Austria
- Belgium
- Bosnia and Herzegovina
- Bulgaria ▼ (15th place, 2024 FIBA U16 EuroBasket Division A)
- Croatia ▼ (16th place, 2024 FIBA U16 EuroBasket Division A)
- Cyprus
- Czech Republic
- Denmark
- Great Britain
- Hungary
- Iceland
- Ireland
- Kosovo ▲ (Winners, 2024 FIBA U16 EuroBasket Division C)
- Montenegro
- Netherlands
- North Macedonia
- Norway
- Poland ▼ (14th place, 2024 FIBA U16 EuroBasket Division A)
- Portugal
- Slovakia
- Sweden
- Ukraine

== First round ==
The draw of the first round was held on 28 January 2025 in Freising, Germany.

In the first round, the teams were drawn into four groups. The first two teams from each group advanced to the quarterfinals; the third and fourth teams advanced to the 9th–16th place playoffs; the other teams advanced to the 17th–22nd place classification.

All times are local (Central European Summer Time; UTC+2).

=== Group A ===
Pos	Team	Pld	W	L	PF	PA	PD	Pts	Qualification
1	Portugal	4	3	1	289	237	+52	7	Quarterfinals
2	Montenegro	4	3	1	323	260	+63	7	Quarterfinals
3	Sweden	4	3	1	327	303	+24	7	9th–16th place playoffs
4	Great Britain	4	1	3	286	314	−28	5	9th–16th place playoffs
5	Austria	4	0	4	238	349	−111	4	17th–22nd place classification

Source: FIBA

7 August 2025
11:00

Boxscore

Great Britain	77–61	Austria
Scoring by quarter: 21–14, 16–15, 24–15, 16–17
Pts: Barry 16; Rebs: Bishop 16; Asts: Barry, Mboura 5		Pts: Kuranovic 19; Rebs: Kuranovic 13; Asts: Seher, Michail 3

Jane Sandanski Arena
Attendance: 50
Referees: Zoran Mitrovski (MKD), Jakub Izák (SVK), Oleksandr Oparin (UKR)

7 August 2025
13:30

Boxscore

Montenegro	63–59	Portugal
Scoring by quarter: 14–13, 19–12, 20–18, 10–16
Pts: Malović 15; Rebs: Furundžić 9 Asts: three players 3		Pts: Faria 14; Rebs: Correia 13; Asts: Faria, M. Sousa 4

Jane Sandanski Arena
Attendance: 50
Referees: Branimir Galić (CRO), Dimitar Georgiev (BUL), Elldin Uglari (KOS)

8 August 2025
11:00

Boxscore

Portugal	68–65	Great Britain
Scoring by quarter: 15–12, 17–24, 13–15, 23–14
Pts: Faria 15; Rebs: M. Sousa 12; Asts: Faria 5		Pts: Bishop 18; Rebs: Francis, Bishop 8 Asts: Barry 4

Jane Sandanski Arena (small)
Attendance: 50
Referees: Hrvoje Ćavar (BIH), Danilo Petković (SRB), Ivan Mijalkovski (MKD)

8 August 2025
21:00

Boxscore

Sweden	82–79	Montenegro
Scoring by quarter: 25–19, 19–19, 15–26, 23–15
Pts: Bahati 22; Rebs: Augustine 10; Asts: Lukic-Gavric 8		Pts: Fantić 16; Rebs: Malović 10; Asts: Popović 5

Jane Sandanski Arena (small)
Attendance: 100
Referees: Teo Miletić (CRO), Mateusz Skorek (POL), Serafim Petrov (BUL)

9 August 2025
16:00

Boxscore

Austria	52–88	Portugal
Scoring by quarter: 19–20, 14–21, 13–22, 6–25
Pts: Edegger 18; Rebs: Gyane 10; Asts: Kuranovic 3		Pts: Faria, M. Sousa 15; Rebs: Faro 5 Asts: Faro 7

Jane Sandanski Arena
Attendance: 50
Referees: Sergii Zashchuk (UKR), László Goda (HUN), Urfan Bayramli (AZE)

9 August 2025
21:00

Boxscore

Great Britain	76–93	Sweden
Scoring by quarter: 19–19, 29–17, 16–33, 12–24
Pts: Bishop 31; Rebs: Bishop 13; Asts: Barry 5		Pts: Augustine 19; Rebs: Gonzalez 8 Asts: Massamba 6

Jane Sandanski Arena
Attendance: 100
Referees: Igor Esteve (AND), Petr Blahout (CZE), Pierre Gilis (BEL)

11 August 2025
16:00

Boxscore

Montenegro	92–68	Great Britain
Scoring by quarter: 22–19, 22–16, 20–14, 28–19
Pts: Fantić 22; Rebs: Bajceta 8 Asts: Bardić 7		Pts: Francis 14; Rebs: Barry 8 Asts: four players 2

Jane Sandanski Arena (small)
Attendance: 50
Referees: Branimir Galić (CRO), Xhelal Mumini (KOS), Ngadhnjim Shabani (KOS)

11 August 2025
18:30

Boxscore

Sweden	95–74	Austria
Scoring by quarter: 20–21, 25–23, 25–7, 25–23
Pts: Lagerkvist 19; Rebs: Ronndahl 8 Asts: Massamba 7		Pts: Edegger 20; Rebs: Kuranovic 10; Asts: Kuranovic 5

Jane Sandanski Arena (small)
Attendance: 50
Referees: Hrvoje Cavar (BIH), Mate Stretea (ROU), Michal Kuzia (POL)

12 August 2025
18:30

Boxscore

Portugal	74–57	Sweden
Scoring by quarter: 23–11, 19–17, 15–16, 17–13
Pts: M. Sousa 15; Rebs: M. Sousa, Giesta 11; Asts: Faria 6		Pts: four players 10; Rebs: Bahati 8 Asts: Massamba 3

Jane Sandanski Arena (small)
Attendance: 50
Referees: Branimir Galić (CRO), László Goda (HUN), Ivan Mijalkovski (MKD)

12 August 2025
21:00

Boxscore

Austria	51–89	Montenegro
Scoring by quarter: 16–26, 14–21, 12–19, 9–23
Pts: three players 12; Rebs: Edegger, Gyane 6 Asts: Grissett, Kuranovic 2		Pts: Malović 15; Rebs: Fantić 6 Asts: Mujović 8

Jane Sandanski Arena
Attendance: 50
Referees: Janis Rozenbergs (LAT), Stefan Zdravković (SRB), Yurii Shcherbak (UKR)

=== Group B ===
Pos	Team	Pld	W	L	PF	PA	PD	Pts	Qualification
1	Poland	5	5	0	402	268	+134	10	Quarterfinals
2	Bosnia and Herzegovina	5	4	1	339	314	+25	9	Quarterfinals
3	Ireland	5	3	2	308	350	−42	8	9th–16th place playoffs
4	North Macedonia	5	1	4	349	366	−17	6	9th–16th place playoffs
5	Cyprus	5	1	4	312	353	−41	6	17th–22nd place classification
6	Slovakia	5	1	4	318	377	−59	6	17th–22nd place classification

Source: FIBA

7 August 2025
16:00

Boxscore

Ireland	67–58	Slovakia
Scoring by quarter: 34–15, 8–11, 11–17, 14–15
Pts: Klimas 18; Rebs: Ehigie 10; Asts: Adjinakou, Klimas 2		Pts: Rybár 19; Rebs: Lukjanec, Pikus 8 Asts: Rybár 6

Jane Sandanski Arena
Attendance: 50
Referees: Teo Miletić (CRO), Stefan Zdravković (SRB), Ngadhnjim Shabani (KOS)

7 August 2025
18:30

Boxscore

Bosnia and Herzegovina	58–87	Poland
Scoring by quarter: 22–12, 14–28, 16–22, 6–25
Pts: Subašić 22; Rebs: Subašić 9 Asts: Subašić 4		Pts: Łata 14; Rebs: Syrzycki 7 Asts: Grzesiak 3

Jane Sandanski Arena (small)
Attendance: 50
Referees: Iyán González Gálvez (ESP), Yurii Shcherbak (UKR), Bilal Bardaqji (SWE)

7 August 2025
18:30

Boxscore

Cyprus	82–76	North Macedonia
Scoring by quarter: 13–19, 19–17, 19–17, 31–23
Pts: Zinonos 22; Rebs: Mikheev 15; Asts: Nicolaou 7		Pts: Chuchanov 18; Rebs: Chuchanov 16; Asts: Angjelovski, Bozhinovski 3

Jane Sandanski Arena
Attendance: 400
Referees: Danilo Petković (SRB), Milosav Kaluđerović (MNE), Daniel Oliveira (POR)

8 August 2025
13:30

Boxscore

Slovakia	64–66	Bosnia and Herzegovina
Scoring by quarter: 13–15, 16–17, 13–17, 22–17
Pts: Rybár 25; Rebs: Džačar 9 Asts: four players 2		Pts: Bristina 18; Rebs: Subašić 6 Asts: Jokić 4

Jane Sandanski Arena (small)
Attendance: 50
Referees: Igor Esteve (AND), Elldin Uglari (KOS), Pierre Gilis (BEL)

8 August 2025
13:30

Boxscore

Poland	55–39	Cyprus
Scoring by quarter: 12–8, 17–10, 13–13, 13–8
Pts: Grzesiak 15; Rebs: Syrzycki 15; Asts: Majcherek 4		Pts: Nicolaou 14; Rebs: Mikheev 14; Asts: three players 2

Jane Sandanski Arena
Attendance: 100
Referees: Xhelal Mumini (KOS), Dimitar Georgiev (BUL), Urfan Bayramlı (AZE)

8 August 2025
18:30

Boxscore

North Macedonia	67–70	Ireland
Scoring by quarter: 21–20, 22–18, 13–5, 11–27
Pts: Gjinovski 19; Rebs: Chuchanov 13; Asts: Chuchanov 5		Pts: Ehigie 19; Rebs: Ehigie 13; Asts: Klimas 3

Jane Sandanski Arena
Attendance: 300
Referees: Sergii Zashchuk (UKR), László Goda (HUN), Oleksandr Oparin (UKR)

9 August 2025
13:30

Boxscore

Bosnia and Herzegovina	79–55	Ireland
Scoring by quarter: 30–11, 10–16, 15–15, 24–13
Pts: Subašić 24; Rebs: Šaćirović 8 Asts: Subašić, Bristina 4		Pts: McGrath 20; Rebs: McGrath 11; Asts: Adjinakou, Vasikauskas 2

Jane Sandanski Arena
Attendance: 100
Referees: Xhelal Mumini (KOS), Janis Rozenbergs (LAT), Dimitar Georgiev (BUL)

9 August 2025
16:00

Boxscore

Cyprus	67–69	Slovakia
Scoring by quarter: 17–14, 25–15, 11–16, 14–24
Pts: Zinonos 28; Rebs: Papazoglou 10; Asts: Nicolaou 3		Pts: Lukjanec 25; Rebs: Lukjanec 14; Asts: Pikus 6

Jane Sandanski Arena (small)
Attendance: 50
Referees: Danilo Petković (SRB), Yurii Shcherbak (UKR), Joseph Hodgson (GBR)

9 August 2025
18:30

Boxscore

Poland	93–66	North Macedonia
Scoring by quarter: 35–11, 19–20, 24–13, 15–22
Pts: Świrydowicz 16; Rebs: Świrydowicz 7 Asts: Majcherek, Łata 4		Pts: Sotir 12; Rebs: Shabani 7 Asts: three players 2

Jane Sandanski Arena
Attendance: 350
Referees: Teo Miletić (CRO), Stefan Zdravković (SRB), Elldin Uglari (KOS)

11 August 2025
11:00

Boxscore

Ireland	78–72	Cyprus
Scoring by quarter: 15–23, 22–13, 19–16, 22–20
Pts: McGrath 25; Rebs: Ehigie, McGrath 8 Asts: Adjinakou 3		Pts: Mikheev 18; Rebs: Mikheev 13; Asts: Nicolaou 6

Jane Sandanski Arena (small)
Attendance: 100
Referees: Iyán González (ESP), Stefan Zdravković (SRB), Pierre Gilis (BEL)

11 August 2025
18:30

Boxscore

North Macedonia	56–61	Bosnia and Herzegovina
Scoring by quarter: 11–13, 17–13, 12–22, 16–13
Pts: Gjinovski 21; Rebs: Chuchanov 15; Asts: Bozhinovski 4		Pts: Subašić 17; Rebs: Bristina 11; Asts: Stanković 4

Jane Sandanski Arena
Attendance: 300
Referees: Petr Blahout (CZE), Yurii Shcherbak (UKR), Fatjon Malevi (ALB)

11 August 2025
21:00

Boxscore

Slovakia	67–93	Poland
Scoring by quarter: 14–28, 16–20, 13–18, 24–27
Pts: Ličko 15; Rebs: Lukjanec 8 Asts: Pikus 5		Pts: Łata 15; Rebs: Łysek 6 Asts: four players 3

Jane Sandanski Arena (small)
Attendance: 50
Referees: Sergii Zashchuk (UKR), Daniel Oliveira (POR), Davit Kikhyan (ARM)

12 August 2025
13:30

Boxscore

Cyprus	52–75	Bosnia and Herzegovina
Scoring by quarter: 10–25, 15–19, 20–19, 7–12
Pts: Papazoglou 11; Rebs: Neofytou 5 Asts: Tryfonos 4		Pts: Subašić 25; Rebs: Šaćirović 7 Asts: Stanković 7

Jane Sandanski Arena
Attendance: 150
Referees: Teo Miletić (CRO), Oleksandr Oparin (UKR), Urfan Bayramli (AZE)

12 August 2025
16:00

Boxscore

Poland	74–38	Ireland
Scoring by quarter: 11–13, 24–10, 23–7, 16–8
Pts: Jakubiec 19; Rebs: Chojnacki 7 Asts: Ochociński, Świrydowicz 3		Pts: McGrath 9 Rebs: Adjinakou, Klimas 8 Asts: Klimas 2

Jane Sandanski Arena (small)
Attendance: 50
Referees: Xhelal Mumini (KOS), Andras Mate Stretea (ROU), Fatjon Malevi (ALB)

12 August 2025
18:30

Boxscore

Slovakia	60–84	North Macedonia
Scoring by quarter: 13–21, 16–23, 17–19, 14–21
Pts: Rybár 18; Rebs: Lukjanec 20; Asts: Rybár 4		Pts: Gjinovski 18; Rebs: Chuchanov 9 Asts: Gjinovski, Rajkovski 3

Jane Sandanski Arena
Attendance: 300
Referees: Danilo Petkovic (SRB), Bilal Bardaqji (SWE), Dimitar Georgiev (BUL)

=== Group C ===
Pos	Team	Pld	W	L	PF	PA	PD	Pts	Qualification
1	Croatia	5	5	0	402	340	+62	10	Quarterfinals
2	Ukraine	5	3	2	367	370	−3	8	Quarterfinals
3	Denmark	5	3	2	375	351	+24	8	9th–16th place playoffs
4	Iceland	5	2	3	410	367	+43	7	9th–16th place playoffs
5	Netherlands	5	2	3	341	352	−11	7	17th–22nd place classification
6	Kosovo	5	0	5	282	397	−115	5	17th–22nd place classification

Source: FIBA

7 August 2025
11:00

Boxscore

Iceland	79–91	Croatia
Scoring by quarter: 17–21, 26–22, 27–28, 9–20
Pts: Snorrason, Rafnarsson 17; Rebs: Andrason 11; Asts: Guðmundsson, Rafnarsson 4		Pts: Garma 25; Rebs: Garma 13; Asts: Garac 6

Jane Sandanski Arena (small)
Attendance: 100
Referees: Igor Esteve (AND), Mateusz Skorek (POL), László Goda (HUN)

7 August 2025
13:30

Boxscore

Ukraine	82–73	Denmark
Scoring by quarter: 23–25, 16–15, 21–16, 22–17
Pts: Datsenko, Tatunchak 25; Rebs: Tatunchak 16; Asts: Petryk 7		Pts: Erichsen 15; Rebs: Møller 15; Asts: Erichsen 4

Jane Sandanski Arena (small)
Attendance: 100
Referees: Petr Blahout (CZE), Aleksandar Radonjic (AUT), Serafim Petrov (BUL)

7 August 2025
16:00

Boxscore

Kosovo	57–61	Netherlands
Scoring by quarter: 16–13, 12–17, 16–13, 13–18
Pts: Gashi 14; Rebs: Gashi 9 Asts: Mehmeti 5		Pts: Bergens 14; Rebs: Mieremet 10; Asts: Bergens 5

Jane Sandanski Arena (small)
Attendance: 50
Referees: Hrvoje Ćavar (BIH), Michał Kuzia (POL), Pierre Gilis (BEL)

8 August 2025
11:00

Boxscore

Croatia	72–61	Kosovo
Scoring by quarter: 19–10, 20–19, 18–19, 15–13
Pts: Garac 18; Rebs: Garac 9 Asts: Perić 3		Pts: Dullovi 27; Rebs: Gashi 10; Asts: Mehmeti 5

Jane Sandanski Arena
Attendance: 100
Referees: Petr Blahout (CZE), Jānis Rozenbergs (LAT), Davit Kikhyan (ARM)

8 August 2025
16:00

Boxscore

Denmark	79–72	Iceland
Scoring by quarter: 20–13, 14–21, 17–24, 28–14
Pts: Troels Smith, Møller 23; Rebs: Møller 10; Asts: Erichsen 6		Pts: Rafnarsson 20; Rebs: Andrason 10; Asts: Andrason, Jónsson 3

Jane Sandanski Arena
Attendance: 50
Referees: Zoran Mitrovski (MKD), Mate Stretea (ROU), Fatjon Malevi (ALB)

8 August 2025
21:00

Boxscore

Netherlands	86–58	Ukraine
Scoring by quarter: 19–10, 16–15, 22–20, 29–13
Pts: Bergens 19; Rebs: Bergens 11; Asts: Bergens 6		Pts: Datsenko 19; Rebs: Hanytskyi 15; Asts: Datsenko 3

Jane Sandanski Arena
Attendance: 100
Referees: Iyán Gonzalez Gálvez (ESP), Stefan Zdravkovic (SRB), Daniel Oliveira (POR)

9 August 2025
11:00

Boxscore

Kosovo	62–87	Denmark
Scoring by quarter: 23–23, 20–14, 8–20, 11–30
Pts: Fazliu 20; Rebs: Gashi 9 Asts: Dullovi 3		Pts: Møller 26; Rebs: Møller 14; Asts: four players 3

Jane Sandanski Arena (small)
Attendance: 50
Referees: Iyán Gonzalez Gálvez (ESP), Mateusz Skorek (POL), Bilal Bardaqji (SWE)

9 August 2025
18:30

Boxscore

Croatia	83–67	Netherlands
Scoring by quarter: 25–11, 15–20, 15–7, 28–29
Pts: Perić 19; Rebs: Garma, Bajković 7 Asts: Garac 5		Pts: Khawam 18; Rebs: van der Pol 8 Asts: Khan, Bergens 2

Jane Sandanski Arena (small)
Attendance: 50
Referees: Zoran Mitrovski (MKD), Aleksandar Radonjic (AUT), Mate Stretea (ROU)

9 August 2025
21:00

Boxscore

Iceland	77–81	Ukraine
Scoring by quarter: 13–19, 15–18, 16–23, 33–21
Pts: Andrason 19; Rebs: Andrason 9 Asts: Andrason 4		Pts: Tatunchak 31; Rebs: Hanytskyi, Tatunchak 12; Asts: Svyrydov 7

Jane Sandanski Arena (small)
Attendance: 50
Referees: Milosav Kaluđerović (MNE), Michal Kuzia (POL), Davit Kikhyan (ARM)

11 August 2025
13:30

Boxscore

Netherlands	69–82	Iceland
Scoring by quarter: 17–13, 12–20, 24–24, 16–25
Pts: Mettes 14; Rebs: Khawam 7 Asts: Bergens 7		Pts: Andrason, Rafnarsson 18; Rebs: Andrason 11; Asts: Rafnarsson 3

Jane Sandanski Arena
Attendance: 100
Referees: Mateusz Skorek (POL), Jakub Izak (SVK), Serafim Petrov (BUL)

11 August 2025
16:00

Boxscore

Ukraine	77–55	Kosovo
Scoring by quarter: 16–18, 19–13, 25–10, 17–14
Pts: Datsenko 23; Rebs: Tatunchak 11; Asts: Sherstiuk 7		Pts: Fazliu 15; Rebs: three players 4 Asts: Mehmeti 7

Jane Sandanski Arena
Attendance: 50
Referees: Janis Rozenbergs (LAT), Aleksandar Radonjic (AUT), László Goda (HUN)

11 August 2025
21:00

Boxscore

Denmark	64–77	Croatia
Scoring by quarter: 17–11, 10–24, 22–29, 15–13
Pts: Erichsen 16; Rebs: Møller 12; Asts: four players 2		Pts: Garac 16; Rebs: Garac 7 Asts: Garac 6

Jane Sandanski Arena
Attendance: 100
Referees: Zoran Mitrovski (MKD), Joseph Hodgson (GBR), Elldin Uglari (KOS)

12 August 2025
11:00

Boxscore

Kosovo	47–100	Iceland
Scoring by quarter: 14–25, 14–19, 8–25, 11–31
Pts: Fazliu 17; Rebs: Fazliu 12; Asts: Mehmeti 9		Pts: Snorrason 16; Rebs: Andrason 14; Asts: Hallgrímsson 6

Jane Sandanski Arena (small)
Attendance: 50
Referees: Petr Blahout (CZE), Aleksandar Radonjic (AUT), Joseph Hodgson (GBR)

12 August 2025
16:00

Boxscore

Croatia	79–69	Ukraine
Scoring by quarter: 15–16, 20–15, 21–17, 23–21
Pts: Ukić 24; Rebs: Garma 10; Asts: Garac 4		Pts: Datsenko 19; Rebs: Hanytskyi 10; Asts: four players 2

Jane Sandanski Arena
Attendance: 100
Referees: Iyán González Gálvez (ESP), Daniel Oliveira (POR), Serafim Petrov (BUL)

12 August 2025
21:00

Boxscore

Denmark	72–58	Netherlands
Scoring by quarter: 24–8, 20–22, 17–6, 11–22
Pts: Erichsen 17; Rebs: Møller 13; Asts: Da Silva, Møller 3		Pts: Bergens 20; Rebs: Khawam 9 Asts: Bergens 3

Jane Sandanski Arena (small)
Attendance: 100
Referees: Hrvoje Cavar (BIH), Michal Kuzia (POL), Davit Kikhyan (ARM)

=== Group D ===
Pos	Team	Pld	W	L	PF	PA	PD	Pts	Qualification
1	Belgium	4	4	0	353	252	+101	8	Quarterfinals
2	Czechia	4	2	2	326	301	+25	6	Quarterfinals
3	Bulgaria	4	2	2	283	327	−44	6	9th–16th place playoffs
4	Hungary	4	2	2	259	272	−13	6	9th–16th place playoffs
5	Norway	4	0	4	235	304	−69	4	17th–22nd place classification

Source: FIBA

7 August 2025
21:00

Boxscore

Hungary	68–50	Norway
Scoring by quarter: 5–13, 20–7, 21–20, 22–10
Pts: Nagy 16; Rebs: Rozmán 9 Asts: V. Gáspár, Inalegwu 4		Pts: three players 8 Rebs: Prus 7 Asts: Zeppos 2

Jane Sandanski Arena
Attendance: 30
Referees: Xhelal Mumini (KOS), Jānis Rozenbergs (LAT), Ivan Mijalkovski (MKD)

7 August 2025
21:00

Boxscore

Bulgaria	80–92	Czechia
Scoring by quarter: 15–25, 23–25, 17–23, 25–19
Pts: Zanov 20; Rebs: Zanov 8 Asts: Valentinov 5		Pts: Chaloupka 26; Rebs: Malík 7 Asts: Malík 5

Jane Sandanski Arena (small)
Attendance: 100
Referees: Sergii Zashchuk (UKR), Mate Stretea (ROU), Joseph Hodgson (GBR)

8 August 2025
16:00

Boxscore

Czechia	74–77	Hungary
Scoring by quarter: 12–23, 24–7, 23–27, 15–20
Pts: Gronský 16; Rebs: Buben 10; Asts: Houška 6		Pts: Rozmán 21; Rebs: Rozmán 7 Asts: Nagy 6

Jane Sandanski Arena (small)
Attendance: 50
Referees: Milosav Kaludjerovic (MNE), Yurii Shcherbak (UKR), Aleksandar Radonjic (AUT)

8 August 2025
18:30

Boxscore

Belgium	109–52	Bulgaria
Scoring by quarter: 27–14, 34–14, 25–10, 23–14
Pts: Ona Embo, Kasongo 21; Rebs: Kasongo, Sokona 6 Asts: Ona Embo 6		Pts: Marchev 13; Rebs: Tanev, Kolev 6 Asts: Valentinov 2

Jane Sandanski Arena (small)
Attendance: 100
Referees: Branimir Galić (CRO), Jakub Izak (SVK), Michal Kuzia (POL)

9 August 2025
11:00

Boxscore

Norway	55–78	Czechia
Scoring by quarter: 16–11, 17–21, 10–27, 12–19
Pts: Falba 12; Rebs: Sanders 6 Asts: Zeppos 4		Pts: Kopecký 18; Rebs: Blabolil 12; Asts: Buben 4

Jane Sandanski Arena
Attendance: 50
Referees: Branimir Galić (CRO), Jakub Izak (SVK), Fatjon Malevi (ALB)

9 August 2025
13:30

Boxscore

Hungary	53–73	Belgium
Scoring by quarter: 12–19, 17–22, 12–9, 12–23
Pts: B. Gáspár 12; Rebs: Nagy 8 Asts: Papp 3		Pts: Ona Embo 21; Rebs: Kasongo 9 Asts: Ona Embo 4

Jane Sandanski Arena (small)
Attendance: 50
Referees: Hrvoje Cavar (BIH), Daniel Oliveira (POR), Ngadhnjim Shabani (KOS)

11 August 2025
11:00

Boxscore

Bulgaria	75–61	Hungary
Scoring by quarter: 20–11, 18–15, 14–17, 23–18
Pts: Marchev 20; Rebs: Zanov 11; Asts: Valentinov 4		Pts: B. Gáspár 18; Rebs: B. Gáspár 10; Asts: Inalegwu 3

Jane Sandanski Arena
Attendance: 100
Referees: Teo Miletić (CRO), Oleksandr Oparin (UKR), Urfan Bayramlı (AZE)

11 August 2025
13:30

Boxscore

Belgium	82–65	Norway
Scoring by quarter: 24–20, 20–16, 19–16, 19–13
Pts: Van de Keere 18; Rebs: Kasongo 11; Asts: Ona Embo 6		Pts: Falba 23; Rebs: Rauf 9 Asts: Zeppos 4

Jane Sandanski Arena (small)
Attendance: 100
Referees: Danilo Petkovic (SRB), Bilal Bardaqji (SWE), Ivan Mijalkovski (MKD)

12 August 2025
11:00

Boxscore

Czechia	82–89	Belgium
Scoring by quarter: 23–34, 19–15, 25–12, 15–28
Pts: Buben 24; Rebs: Chaloupka 16; Asts: Houška 8		Pts: Ona Embo 31; Rebs: Ona Embo 7 Asts: Rotsaert 6

Jane Sandanski Arena
Attendance: 150
Referees: Sergii Zashchuk (UKR), Igor Esteve (AND), Jakub Izák (SVK)

12 August 2025
13:30

Boxscore

Norway	65–76	Bulgaria
Scoring by quarter: 15–31, 12–10, 15–16, 23–19
Pts: Falba 16; Rebs: Alleyne, Hannisdal 5 Asts: three players 2		Pts: Marchev 17; Rebs: three players 6 Asts: Marchev 7

Jane Sandanski Arena (small)
Attendance: 50
Referees: Mateusz Skorek (POL), Milosav Kaluđerović (MNE), Ngadhnjim Shabani (KOS)

== 17th–22nd place classification ==
=== Group E ===
Pos	Team	Pld	W	L	PF	PA	PD	Pts	Qualification
1	Slovakia	2	2	0	150	121	+29	4	17th place match
2	Cyprus	2	1	1	142	125	+17	3	19th place match
3	Austria	2	0	2	110	156	−46	2	21st place match

Source: FIBA

14 August 2025
11:00

Boxscore

Slovakia	81–54	Austria
Scoring by quarter: 18–8, 19–17, 19–16, 25–13
Pts: Rybár 17; Rebs: Lukjanec 16; Asts: Józsa 4		Pts: Pichler 10; Rebs: Kuranovic 5 Asts: Grissett, Michail 3

Jane Sandanski Arena
Attendance: 100
Referees: Zoran Mitrovski (MKD), Milosav Kaluđerović (MNE), Elldin Uglari (KOS)

15 August 2025
11:00

Boxscore

Austria	56–75	Cyprus
Scoring by quarter: 22–18, 12–26, 16–11, 6–20
Pts: Kuranovic 20; Rebs: Kuranovic 8 Asts: Michail 5		Pts: Nicolaou 24; Rebs: Mikheev 11; Asts: Nicolaou, Zinonos 4

Jane Sandanski Arena (small)
Attendance: 50
Referees: Mateusz Skorek (POL), Urfan Bayramlı (AZE), Davit Kikhyan (ARM)

=== Group F ===
Pos	Team	Pld	W	L	PF	PA	PD	Pts	Qualification
1	Netherlands	2	2	0	120	103	+17	4	17th place match
2	Norway	2	1	1	113	121	−8	3	19th place match
3	Kosovo	2	0	2	119	128	−9	2	21st place match

Source: FIBA

14 August 2025
11:00

Boxscore

Kosovo	62–67	Norway
Scoring by quarter: 12–11, 14–18, 20–14, 16–24
Pts: Fazliu 17; Rebs: Libusha 10; Asts: Mehmeti 6		Pts: Sanders 13; Rebs: Prus, Sanders 7 Asts: three players 3

Jane Sandanski Arena (small)
Attendance: 100
Referees: Teo Miletić (CRO), Dimitar Georgiev (BUL), Davit Kikhyan (ARM)

15 August 2025
11:00

Boxscore

Norway	46–59	Netherlands
Scoring by quarter: 11–14, 9–10, 10–17, 16–18
Pts: Sanford, Falba 11; Rebs: Rauf 9 Asts: Sanford 2		Pts: Damen 19; Rebs: Mettes 10; Asts: Damen, Jagt 4

Jane Sandanski Arena
Attendance: 50
Referees: Sergii Zashchuk (UKR), Michał Kuzia (POL), Fatjon Malevi (ALB)

=== 21st place match ===
16 August 2025
16:30

Boxscore

Austria	72–63	Kosovo
Scoring by quarter: 25–14, 7–15, 17–12, 23–22
Pts: Edegger 23; Rebs: Edegger 13; Asts: Grissett 5		Pts: Gashi 16; Rebs: Gashi 11; Asts: Mehmeti 3

Jane Sandanski Arena
Attendance: 50
Referees: Teo Miletić (CRO), László Goda (HUN), Joseph Hodgson (GBR)

=== 19th place match ===
16 August 2025
09:00

Boxscore

Cyprus	68–66	Norway
Scoring by quarter: 9–22, 24–19, 14–10, 21–15
Pts: Mastoris 17; Rebs: Mikheev 11; Asts: Zinonos 6		Pts: Farstadvoll-Furnes 17; Rebs: Rauf 11; Asts: Falba 3

Jane Sandanski Arena (small)
Attendance: 50
Referees: Milosav Kaluđerović (MNE), Fatjon Malevi (ALB), Elldin Uglari (KOS)

=== 17th place match ===
16 August 2025
09:00

Boxscore

Slovakia	77–69	Netherlands
Scoring by quarter: 23–16, 22–19, 23–24, 9–10
Pts: Rybár 22; Rebs: Džačar, Mrva 8 Asts: Džačar 4		Pts: Mettes 23; Rebs: Urban 6 Asts: Jagt, Khan 5

Jane Sandanski Arena
Attendance: 25
Referees: Iyán González Gálvez (ESP), Ngadhnjim Shabani (KOS), Dimitar Georgiev (BUL)

== 9th–16th place playoffs ==
13th place match
Bulgaria	61
Hungary	77
15th place match
North Macedonia	76
Great Britain	88

13th–16th place semifinals
North Macedonia	65
Bulgaria	70
Great Britain	61
Hungary	68

9th–16th place quarterfinals
A3	Sweden	84
B4	North Macedonia	79
D3	Bulgaria	72
C4	Iceland	89
B3	Ireland	68
A4	Great Britain	58
C3	Denmark	85
D4	Hungary	84

9th–12th place semifinals
Sweden	69
Iceland	73
Ireland	49
Denmark	84

9th place match
Iceland	82
Denmark	83
11th place match
Sweden	75
Ireland	67

=== 9th–16th place quarterfinals ===
14 August 2025
13:30

Boxscore

Ireland	68–58	Great Britain
Scoring by quarter: 12–18, 23–11, 20–14, 13–15
Pts: McGrath 28; Rebs: McGrath 17; Asts: Vasikauskas 3		Pts: Tjongondjoza, Bishop 15; Rebs: Wilkinson 11; Asts: Mboura 3

Jane Sandanski Arena (small)
Attendance: 100
Referees: Stefan Zdravković (SRB), Bilal Bardaqji (SWE), Serafim Petrov (BUL)

14 August 2025
16:00

Boxscore

Denmark	85–84	Hungary
Scoring by quarter: 18–27, 24–21, 12–19, 31–17
Pts: Fruelund 16; Rebs: Møller 9 Asts: Erichsen 5		Pts: B. Gáspár, Marokházi 15; Rebs: Marokházi 9 Asts: V. Gáspár, Inalegwu 5

Jane Sandanski Arena (small)
Attendance: 100
Referees: Mateusz Skorek (POL), Xhelal Mumini (KOS), Ivan Mijalkovski (MKD)

14 August 2025
18:30

Boxscore

Sweden	84–79	North Macedonia
Scoring by quarter: 23–16, 21–20, 23–17, 17–26
Pts: Lukic-Gavric 25; Rebs: Lagerkvist 10; Asts: Lukic-Gavric 7		Pts: Boshkovski 27; Rebs: Boshkovski 9 Asts: Shabani 6

Jane Sandanski Arena (small)
Attendance: 100
Referees: Hrvoje Ćavar (BIH), Pierre Gilis (BEL), Ngadhnjim Shabani (KOS)

14 August 2025
21:00

Boxscore

Bulgaria	72–89	Iceland
Scoring by quarter: 18–19, 18–24, 19–23, 17–23
Pts: Marchev 18; Rebs: Zanov 14; Asts: Dimov 4		Pts: Andrason 29; Rebs: Andrason 10; Asts: Andrason 5

Jane Sandanski Arena (small)
Attendance: 50
Referees: Danilo Petković (SRB), Urfan Bayramlı (AZE), Fatjon Malevi (ALB)

=== 13th–16th place semifinals ===
15 August 2025
13:30

Boxscore

Great Britain	61–68	Hungary
Scoring by quarter: 12–25, 19–14, 17–9, 13–20
Pts: Bishop 19; Rebs: Bishop 8 Asts: Burr 4		Pts: V. Gáspár 17; Rebs: B. Gáspár 7 Asts: V. Gáspár 4

Jane Sandanski Arena (small)
Attendance: 100
Referees: Branimir Galić (CRO), Oleksandr Oparin (UKR), Elldin Uglari (KOS)

15 August 2025
16:00

Boxscore

North Macedonia	65–70	Bulgaria
Scoring by quarter: 16–14, 16–20, 18–23, 15–13
Pts: Iliev 18; Rebs: Chuchanov 12; Asts: Sotir 2		Pts: Dimov 17; Rebs: Kolev 11; Asts: Valentinov 12

Jane Sandanski Arena (small)
Attendance: 50
Referees: Petr Blahout (CZE), Bilal Bardaqji (SWE), Pierre Gilis (BEL)

=== 15th place match ===
16 August 2025
11:30

Boxscore

North Macedonia	76–88	Great Britain
Scoring by quarter: 16–26, 17–21, 26–25, 17–16
Pts: Shabani 23; Rebs: Begovski 11; Asts: Angjelovski 5		Pts: Tjongondjoza 31; Rebs: Wilkinson 13; Asts: Mboura 9

Jane Sandanski Arena (small)
Attendance: 200
Referees: Hrvoje Ćavar (BIH), Mate Stretea (ROU), Serafim Petrov (BUL)

=== 13th place match ===
16 August 2025
11:30

Boxscore

Bulgaria	61–77	Hungary
Scoring by quarter: 14–22, 14–24, 14–15, 19–16
Pts: Marchev 13; Rebs: Zanov 7 Asts: Valentinov, Tsokov 3		Pts: B. Gáspár, Szafkó 14; Rebs: B. Gáspár 11; Asts: Inalegwu 4

Jane Sandanski Arena
Attendance: 50
Referees: Daniel Oliveira (POR), Jakub Izák (SVK), Davit Kikhyan (ARM)

=== 9th–12th place semifinals ===
15 August 2025
18:30

Boxscore

Sweden	69–73	Iceland
Scoring by quarter: 28–14, 11–28, 17–13, 13–18
Pts: Gonzalez 18; Rebs: Gonzalez 21; Asts: Massamba, Lukić-Gavrić 3		Pts: Rafnarsson 22; Rebs: Andrason 22; Asts: Andrason 6

Jane Sandanski Arena (small)
Attendance: 50
Referees: Jānis Rozenbergs (LAT), Joseph Hodgson (GBR), Ivan Mijalkovski (MKD)

15 August 2025
21:00

Boxscore

Ireland	49–84	Denmark
Scoring by quarter: 16–23, 13–21, 13–22, 7–18
Pts: Klimas 11; Rebs: McGrath, O'Shaughnessy 6 Asts: Klimas 2		Pts: Erichsen 29; Rebs: Da Silva, Møller 8 Asts: Bendixen 4

Jane Sandanski Arena (small)
Attendance: 100
Referees: Daniel Oliveira (POR), Milosav Kaluđerović (MNE), Ngadhnjim Shabani (KOS)

=== 11th place match ===
16 August 2025
16:30

Boxscore

Sweden	75–67	Ireland
Scoring by quarter: 15–19, 18–16, 22–17, 20–15
Pts: Lagerkvist 22; Rebs: Gonzalez 8 Asts: Massamba 6		Pts: Klimas 26; Rebs: Ehigie 8 Asts: Klimas 3

Jane Sandanski Arena (small)
Attendance: 50
Referees: Zoran Mitrovski (MKD), Pierre Gilis (BEL), Urfan Bayramlı (AZE)

=== 9th place match ===
16 August 2025
19:00

Boxscore

Iceland	82–83	Denmark
Scoring by quarter: 17–25, 22–25, 25–17, 18–16
Pts: Andrason 23; Rebs: Andrason 9 Asts: Arnarsson 5		Pts: Erichsen, Troels Smith 17; Rebs: Da Silva 16; Asts: Sibbern 4

Jane Sandanski Arena (small)
Attendance: 50
Referees: Stefan Zdravković (SRB), Oleksandr Oparin (UKR), Michał Kuzia (POL)

== Championship playoffs ==
5th place match
Ukraine	67
Montenegro	82
7th place match
Bosnia and Herzegovina	83
Croatia	74

5th–8th place semifinals
Ukraine	73
Bosnia and Herzegovina	66
Montenegro	92
Croatia	69

Quarterfinals
A1	Portugal	76
B2	Bosnia and Herzegovina	61
D1	Belgium	77
C2	Ukraine	51
B1	Poland	90
A2	Montenegro	68
C1	Croatia	79
D2	Czechia	95

Semifinals
Portugal	60
Belgium	71
Poland	76
Czechia	64

Final
Belgium	67
Poland	68
3rd place match
Portugal	67
Czechia	85

=== Quarterfinals ===
14 August 2025
13:30

Boxscore

Portugal	76–61	Bosnia and Herzegovina
Scoring by quarter: 23–10, 13–16, 17–17, 23–18
Pts: Faria 22; Rebs: M. Sousa 12; Asts: Faria 5		Pts: Subašić 19; Rebs: Bristina 7 Asts: Jokić, Subašić 2

Jane Sandanski Arena
Attendance: 100
Referees: Petr Blahout (CZE), Jānis Rozenbergs (LAT), Joseph Hodgson (GBR)

14 August 2025
16:00

Boxscore

Belgium	77–51	Ukraine
Scoring by quarter: 17–18, 20–7, 19–11, 21–15
Pts: Ona Embo 28; Rebs: Havyarimana 10; Asts: Rotsaert 6		Pts: Datsenko 19; Rebs: Tatunchak 11; Asts: Svyrydov, Hanytskyi 2

Jane Sandanski Arena
Attendance: 50
Referees: Branimir Galić (CRO), Igor Esteve (AND), Mate Stretea (ROU)

14 August 2025
18:30

Boxscore

Poland	90–68	Montenegro
Scoring by quarter: 22–21, 14–9, 23–18, 31–20
Pts: three players 14; Rebs: Łysek 12; Asts: Łata 10		Pts: Malović 13; Rebs: Malović 9 Asts: Mujović 8

Jane Sandanski Arena
Attendance: 80
Referees: Sergii Zashchuk (UKR), Daniel Oliveira (POR), Yurii Shcherbak (UKR)

14 August 2025
21:00

Boxscore

Croatia	79–95	Czechia
Scoring by quarter: 18–23, 14–27, 22–22, 25–23
Pts: Garma 25; Rebs: Vidaković 12; Asts: Ukić 5		Pts: Gronský 23; Rebs: Houška 11; Asts: Houška 7

Jane Sandanski Arena
Attendance: 100
Referees: Iyán González (ESP), Aleksandar Radonjić (AUT), Oleksandr Oparin (UKR)

=== 5th–8th place semifinals ===
15 August 2025
13:30

Boxscore

Bosnia and Herzegovina	66–73	Ukraine
Scoring by quarter: 14–16, 12–24, 11–17, 29–16
Pts: Kovač 20; Rebs: Kovač 11; Asts: Jokić 3		Pts: Datsenko 29; Rebs: three players 8 Asts: Datsenko 5

Jane Sandanski Arena
Attendance: 10
Referees: Iyán González (ESP), Jakub Izák (SVK), Serafim Petrov (BUL)

15 August 2025
16:00

Boxscore

Montenegro	92–69	Croatia
Scoring by quarter: 20–16, 18–15, 30–14, 24–24
Pts: Malović 23; Rebs: Radović 6 Asts: Radović 6		Pts: Perić 15; Rebs: Kostelac 10; Asts: Garac 5

Jane Sandanski Arena
Attendance: 50
Referees: Igor Esteve (AND), László Goda (HUN), Dimitar Georgiev (BUL)

=== 7th place match ===
16 August 2025
14:00

Boxscore

Bosnia and Herzegovina	83–74	Croatia
Scoring by quarter: 18–19, 30–16, 13–25, 22–14
Pts: Subašić 24; Rebs: Mahalbašić 7 Asts: Subašić 5		Pts: Garma 17; Rebs: Bajković 10; Asts: Garac 6

Jane Sandanski Arena (small)
Attendance: 50
Referees: Xhelal Mumini (KOS), Yurii Shcherbak (UKR), Ivan Mijalkovski (MKD)

=== 5th place match ===
16 August 2025
14:00

Boxscore

Ukraine	67–82	Montenegro
Scoring by quarter: 14–12, 13–19, 14–25, 26–26
Pts: Datsenko 26; Rebs: Tatunchak 15; Asts: Hanytskyi 5		Pts: Fantić 31; Rebs: Malović 9 Asts: Popović, Fantić 5

Jane Sandanski Arena
Attendance: 50
Referees: Danilo Petković (SRB), Aleksandar Radonjic (AUT), Bilal Bardaqji (SWE)

=== Semifinals ===
15 August 2025
18:30

Boxscore

Portugal	60–71	Belgium
Scoring by quarter: 16–24, 15–16, 15–15, 14–16
Pts: Faro 16; Rebs: M. Sousa 12; Asts: Faria 5		Pts: Ona Embo 24; Rebs: Kasongo 10; Asts: Rotsaert, Ngamunguela 4

Jane Sandanski Arena
Attendance: 100
Referees: Danilo Petković (SRB), Hrvoje Ćavar (BIH), Stefan Zdravković (SRB)

15 August 2025
21:00

Boxscore

Poland	76–64	Czechia
Scoring by quarter: 14–12, 26–16, 13–13, 23–23
Pts: Łysek 13; Rebs: Świrydowicz, Syrzycki 8 Asts: Majcherek 4		Pts: Kopecký 21; Rebs: Chaloupka, Buben 11; Asts: Houška 6

Jane Sandanski Arena
Attendance: 50
Referees: Teo Miletić (CRO), Xhelal Mumini (KOS), Zoran Mitrovski (MKD)

=== 3rd place match ===
16 August 2025
19:00

Boxscore

Portugal	67–85	Czechia
Scoring by quarter: 23–30, 17–13, 12–26, 15–16
Pts: Faro 26; Rebs: M. Sousa 13; Asts: Moreira 4		Pts: Buben 24; Rebs: Chaloupka 12; Asts: Houška 6

Jane Sandanski Arena
Attendance: 50
Referees: Janis Rozenbergs (LAT), Mateusz Skorek (POL), Igor Esteve (AND)

=== Final ===
16 August 2025
21:30

Boxscore

Belgium	67–68	Poland
Scoring by quarter: 20–12, 16–18, 11–19, 20–19
Pts: Havyarimana 16; Rebs: Kasongo 14; Asts: Rotsaert 5		Pts: Majcherek 17; Rebs: Łysek 14; Asts: Majcherek 6

Jane Sandanski Arena
Attendance: 600
Referees: Sergii Zashchuk (UKR), Petr Blahout (CZE), Branimir Galić (CRO)

== Final standings ==
Rank	Team	Record
1st place, gold medalist(s)	Poland	8–0
2nd place, silver medalist(s)	Belgium	6–1
3rd place, bronze medalist(s)	Czechia	4–3
4	Portugal	4–3
5	Montenegro	5–2
6	Ukraine	4–4
7	Bosnia and Herzegovina	5–3
8	Croatia	5–3
9	Denmark	6–2
10	Iceland	4–4
11	Sweden	5–2
12	Ireland	4–4
13	Hungary	4–3
14	Bulgaria	3–4
15	Great Britain	2–5
16	North Macedonia	1–7
17	Slovakia	3–4
18	Netherlands	3–4
19	Cyprus	3–4
20	Norway	1–6
21	Austria	1–6
22	Kosovo	0–7

Promoted to the 2026 FIBA U16 EuroBasket Division A
Relegated to the 2026 FIBA U16 EuroBasket Division C
