= 2026 FIBA U16 EuroBasket Division B =

International youth basketball tournament

Tournament details
- Host country: North Macedonia
- Cities: Gevgelija; Skopje
- Dates: 6–15 August 2026
- Teams: 22 (from 1 confederation)
- Venues: 2 (in 2 host cities)

Final positions
- Champions: Croatia (2nd title)
- Runners-up: Iceland
- Third place: Estonia

Tournament statistics
- MVP: (Croatia) Luka Leni Ukić

Official website
- www.fiba.basketball

The 2026 FIBA U16 EuroBasket Division B was the 21st edition of the Division B of the European basketball championship for men's under-16 national teams. The tournament was played in Gevgelija and Skopje, North Macedonia, from 6 to 15 August 2026.

Croatia secured their second Division B title with a victory over Iceland in the final, 69–67.

== Participating teams ==
- Austria
- Bosnia and Herzegovina
- Bulgaria
- Croatia
- Cyprus
- Denmark
- Estonia ▼ (14th place, 2025 FIBA U16 EuroBasket Division A)
- Finland ▼ (15th place, 2025 FIBA U16 EuroBasket Division A)
- Great Britain
- Hungary
- Iceland
- Ireland
- Luxembourg ▲ (Winners, 2025 FIBA U16 EuroBasket Division C)
- Montenegro
- Netherlands
- North Macedonia
- Norway
- Portugal
- Slovakia
- Switzerland ▼ (16th place, 2025 FIBA U16 EuroBasket Division A)
- Sweden
- Ukraine

== Venues ==
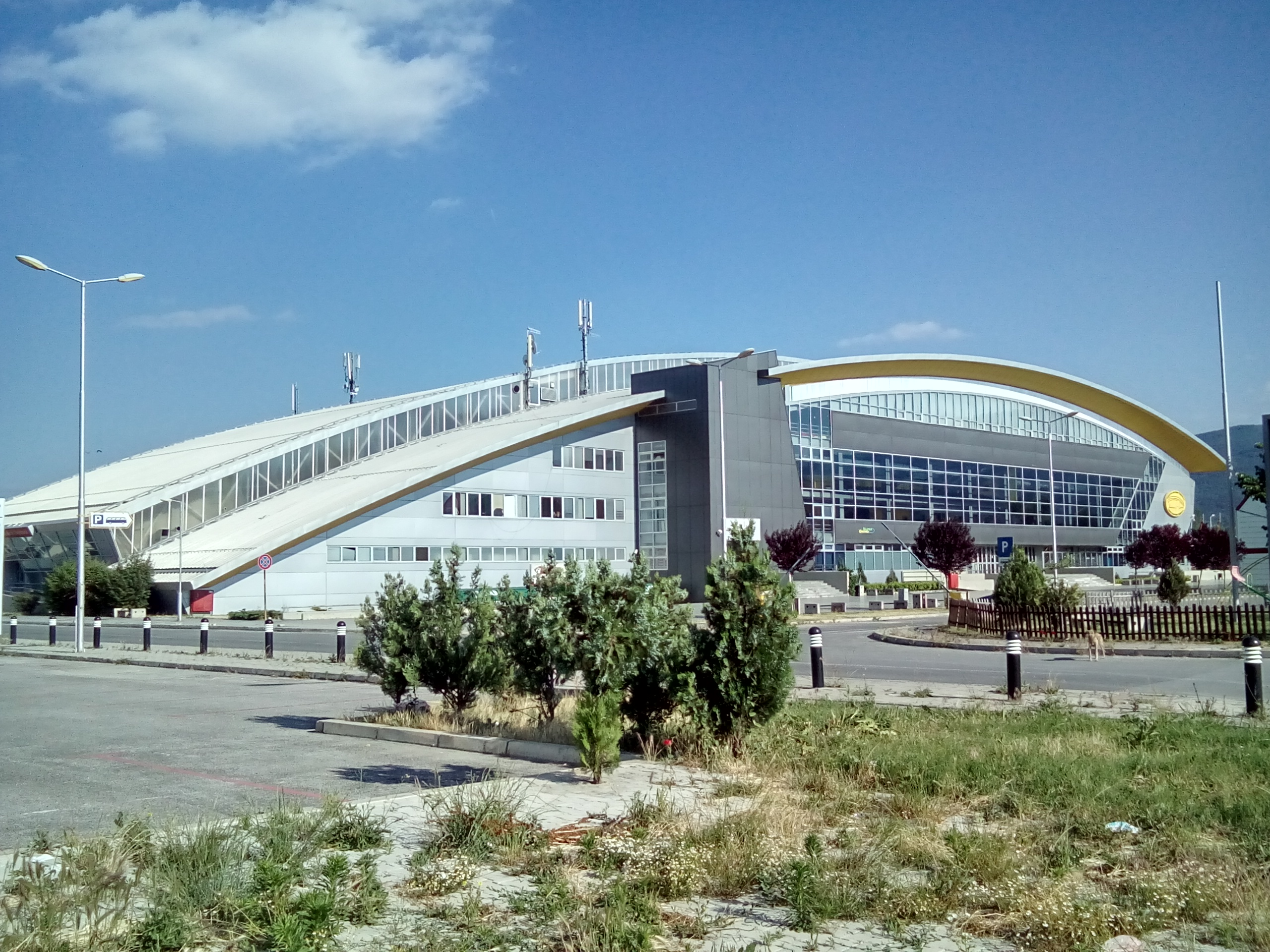
Boris Trajkovski Sports Center

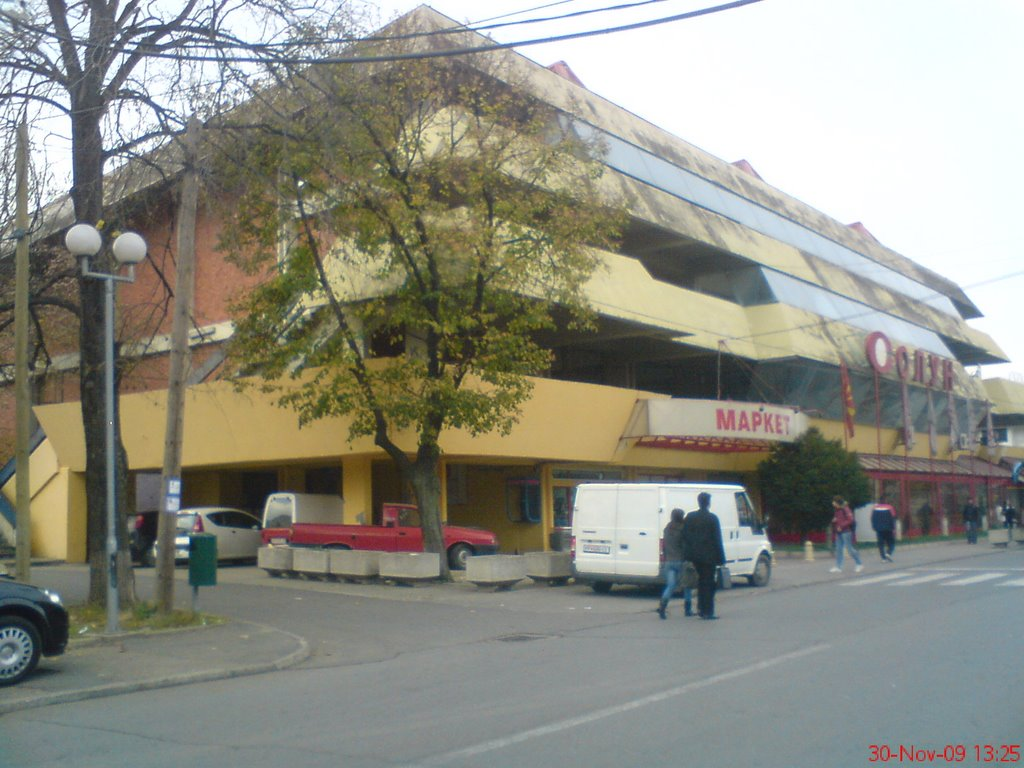
Sports Hall "26th April"

== First round ==
The draw of the first round was held on 5 February 2026 in Freising, Germany.

In the first round, the teams were drawn into four groups. The first two teams from each group advanced to the quarterfinals; the third and fourth teams advanced to the 9th–16th place playoffs; the other teams were dropped to the 17th–22nd place classification.

All times are local (Central European Summer Time; UTC+2).

=== Group A ===
Pos	Team	Pld	W	L	PF	PA	PD	Pts	Qualification
1	Montenegro	4	3	1	340	279	+61	7	Quarterfinals
2	Netherlands	4	3	1	245	238	+7	7	Quarterfinals
3	Ireland	4	2	2	291	281	+10	6	9th–16th place playoffs
4	Slovakia	4	2	2	304	308	−4	6	9th–16th place playoffs
5	Portugal	4	0	4	246	320	−74	4	17th–22nd place classification

Source: FIBA

6 August 2026
11:00

Boxscore

Ireland	55–62	Netherlands
Scoring by quarter: 10–16, 16–11, 19–14, 10–21

Sports Hall "26th April", Gevgelija
Attendance: 50

6 August 2026
13:30

Boxscore

Montenegro	95–66	Portugal
Scoring by quarter: 28–16, 20–18, 26–19, 21–13

Sports Hall "26th April", Gevgelija
Attendance: 50

7 August 2026
16:00

Boxscore

Slovakia	88–77	Montenegro
Scoring by quarter: 33–15, 15–21, 25–24, 15–17

Sports Hall "26th April", Gevgelija
Attendance: 40

7 August 2026
21:00

Boxscore

Portugal	61–68	Ireland
Scoring by quarter: 17–12, 8–23, 13–18, 23–15

Sports Hall "26th April", Gevgelija
Attendance: 100

8 August 2026
13:30

Boxscore

Ireland	96–67	Slovakia
Scoring by quarter: 26–23, 18–16, 28–16, 24–12

Sports Hall "26th April", Gevgelija
Attendance: 70

8 August 2026
16:00

Boxscore

Netherlands	66–48	Portugal
Scoring by quarter: 4–10, 20–11, 26–13, 16–14

Sports Hall "26th April", Gevgelija
Attendance: 50

10 August 2026
11:00

Boxscore

Montenegro	91–72	Ireland
Scoring by quarter: 20–19, 23–20, 23–10, 25–23

Sports Hall "26th April", Gevgelija

10 August 2026
21:00

Boxscore

Slovakia	58–64	Netherlands
Scoring by quarter: 24–11, 13–17, 8–16, 13–20

Sports Hall "26th April", Gevgelija

11 August 2026
13:30

Boxscore

Portugal	71–91	Slovakia
Scoring by quarter: 13–18, 22–25, 23–32, 13–16

Sports Hall "26th April", Gevgelija
Attendance: 50

11 August 2026
21:00

Boxscore

Netherlands	53–77	Montenegro
Scoring by quarter: 8–24, 10–25, 18–13, 17–15

Sports Hall "26th April", Gevgelija
Attendance: 50

=== Group B ===
Pos	Team	Pld	W	L	PF	PA	PD	Pts	Qualification
1	Croatia	5	5	0	510	244	+266	10	Quarterfinals
2	Iceland	5	4	1	385	342	+43	9	Quarterfinals
3	Ukraine	5	3	2	349	374	−25	8	9th–16th place playoffs
4	North Macedonia (H)	5	2	3	373	422	−49	7	9th–16th place playoffs
5	Cyprus	5	1	4	273	356	−83	6	17th–22nd place classification
6	Switzerland	5	0	5	270	422	−152	5	17th–22nd place classification

Source: FIBA
(H) Hosts

6 August 2026
16:00

Boxscore

Switzerland	47–101	Croatia
Scoring by quarter: 5–32, 14–20, 14–23, 14–26

Sports Hall "26th April", Gevgelija
Attendance: 45

6 August 2026
18:30

Boxscore

Cyprus	63–82	North Macedonia
Scoring by quarter: 19–28, 14–17, 14–23, 16–14

Sports Hall "26th April", Gevgelija
Attendance: 280

6 August 2026
21:00

Boxscore

Iceland	88–77	Ukraine
Scoring by quarter: 22–16, 20–18, 29–24, 17–19

Sports Hall "26th April", Gevgelija
Attendance: 70

7 August 2026
11:00

Boxscore

Croatia	107–33	Cyprus
Scoring by quarter: 22–9, 23–8, 32–6, 30–10

Sports Hall "26th April", Gevgelija
Attendance: 50

7 August 2026
13:30

Boxscore

Ukraine	72–51	Switzerland
Scoring by quarter: 26–2, 11–16, 14–23, 21–10

Sports Hall "26th April", Gevgelija
Attendance: 50

7 August 2026
18:30

Boxscore

North Macedonia	75–87	Iceland
Scoring by quarter: 10–23, 18–12, 28–24, 19–28

Sports Hall "26th April", Gevgelija
Attendance: 100

8 August 2026
11:00

Boxscore

Switzerland	52–96	Iceland
Scoring by quarter: 7–27, 12–26, 15–22, 18–21

Sports Hall "26th April", Gevgelija
Attendance: 50

8 August 2026
18:30

Boxscore

Croatia	112–57	North Macedonia
Scoring by quarter: 21–15, 25–18, 35–14, 31–10

Sports Hall "26th April", Gevgelija
Attendance: 250

8 August 2026
21:00

Boxscore

Cyprus	55–62	Ukraine
Scoring by quarter: 20–12, 8–20, 6–11, 21–19

Sports Hall "26th April", Gevgelija
Attendance: 35

10 August 2026
13:30

Boxscore

Iceland	61–58	Cyprus
Scoring by quarter: 12–14, 21–20, 17–16, 11–8

Sports Hall "26th April", Gevgelija
Attendance: 50

10 August 2026
16:00

Boxscore

Ukraine	54–110	Croatia
Scoring by quarter: 16–26, 14–30, 9–26, 15–28

Sports Hall "26th April", Gevgelija
Attendance: 30

10 August 2026
18:30

Boxscore

North Macedonia	89–76	Switzerland
Scoring by quarter: 16–30, 22–23, 26–14, 25–9

Sports Hall "26th April", Gevgelija
Attendance: 250

11 August 2026
11:00

Boxscore

Cyprus	64–44	Switzerland
Scoring by quarter: 12–10, 18–13, 19–9, 15–12

Sports Hall "26th April", Gevgelija
Attendance: 50

11 August 2026
16:00

Boxscore

Croatia	80–53	Iceland
Scoring by quarter: 17–10, 19–13, 21–15, 23–15

Sports Hall "26th April", Gevgelija
Attendance: 40

11 August 2026
18:30

Boxscore

Ukraine	84–70	North Macedonia
Scoring by quarter: 22–19, 24–20, 24–10, 14–21

Sports Hall "26th April", Gevgelija
Attendance: 250

=== Group C ===
Pos	Team	Pld	W	L	PF	PA	PD	Pts	Qualification
1	Sweden	5	4	1	441	390	+51	9	Quarterfinals
2	Bosnia and Herzegovina	5	4	1	392	368	+24	9	Quarterfinals
3	Bulgaria	5	3	2	367	352	+15	8	9th–16th place playoffs
4	Finland	5	3	2	436	345	+91	8	9th–16th place playoffs
5	Norway	5	1	4	360	438	−78	6	17th–22nd place classification
6	Luxembourg	5	0	5	299	402	−103	5	17th–22nd place classification

Source: FIBA

6 August 2026
11:00

Boxscore

Luxembourg	75–88	Sweden
Scoring by quarter: 25–21, 15–24, 21–22, 14–21

Boris Trajkovski Sports Center, Skopje
Attendance: 50

6 August 2026
13:30

Boxscore

Bosnia and Herzegovina	83–66	Norway
Scoring by quarter: 24–17, 23–14, 21–14, 15–21

Boris Trajkovski Sports Center, Skopje
Attendance: 50

6 August 2026
16:00

Boxscore

Bulgaria	75–67	Finland
Scoring by quarter: 15–26, 21–13, 22–12, 17–16

Boris Trajkovski Sports Center, Skopje
Attendance: 50

7 August 2026
11:00

Boxscore

Norway	65–80	Bulgaria
Scoring by quarter: 13–19, 23–23, 16–13, 13–25

Boris Trajkovski Sports Center, Skopje
Attendance: 50

7 August 2026
18:30

Boxscore

Sweden	88–75	Bosnia and Herzegovina
Scoring by quarter: 18–24, 24–20, 24–20, 22–11

Boris Trajkovski Sports Center, Skopje
Attendance: 100

7 August 2026
21:00

Boxscore

Finland	85–45	Luxembourg
Scoring by quarter: 25–9, 18–13, 19–10, 23–13

Boris Trajkovski Sports Center, Skopje
Attendance: 50

8 August 2026
16:00

Boxscore

Luxembourg	54–88	Norway
Scoring by quarter: 13–23, 13–20, 13–26, 15–19

Boris Trajkovski Sports Center, Skopje
Attendance: 50

8 August 2026
18:30

Boxscore

Finland	98–79	Sweden
Scoring by quarter: 29–24, 28–17, 19–19, 22–19

Boris Trajkovski Sports Center, Skopje
Attendance: 70

8 August 2026
21:00

Boxscore

Bulgaria	74–84	Bosnia and Herzegovina
Scoring by quarter: 21–18, 17–23, 17–19, 19–24

Boris Trajkovski Sports Center, Skopje
Attendance: 150

10 August 2026
13:30

Boxscore

Sweden	81–73	Bulgaria
Scoring by quarter: 22–21, 16–16, 24–15, 19–21

Boris Trajkovski Sports Center, Skopje
Attendance: 50

10 August 2026
18:30

Boxscore

Norway	72–116	Finland
Scoring by quarter: 16–42, 20–21, 22–22, 14–31

Boris Trajkovski Sports Center, Skopje
Attendance: 50

10 August 2026
21:00

Boxscore

Bosnia and Herzegovina	76–70	Luxembourg
Scoring by quarter: 29–26, 20–10, 15–17, 12–17

Boris Trajkovski Sports Center, Skopje
Attendance: 50

11 August 2026
11:00

Boxscore

Norway	69–105	Sweden
Scoring by quarter: 17–25, 13–22, 21–30, 18–28

Boris Trajkovski Sports Center, Skopje
Attendance: 50

11 August 2026
13:30

Boxscore

Finland	70–74	Bosnia and Herzegovina
Scoring by quarter: 25–20, 15–21, 20–11, 10–22

Boris Trajkovski Sports Center, Skopje
Attendance: 50

11 August 2026
18:30

Boxscore

Luxembourg	55–65	Bulgaria
Scoring by quarter: 3–18, 19–12, 17–20, 16–15

Boris Trajkovski Sports Center, Skopje
Attendance: 50

=== Group D ===
Pos	Team	Pld	W	L	PF	PA	PD	Pts	Qualification
1	Great Britain	4	3	1	291	276	+15	7	Quarterfinals
2	Estonia	4	3	1	298	269	+29	7	Quarterfinals
3	Hungary	4	2	2	301	276	+25	6	9th–16th place playoffs
4	Austria	4	1	3	244	283	−39	5	9th–16th place playoffs
5	Denmark	4	1	3	296	326	−30	5	17th–22nd place classification

Source: FIBA

6 August 2026
18:30

Boxscore

Austria	57–80	Great Britain
Scoring by quarter: 17–16, 20–24, 10–15, 10–25

Boris Trajkovski Sports Center, Skopje
Attendance: 50

6 August 2026
21:00

Boxscore

Estonia	74–65	Hungary
Scoring by quarter: 16–11, 12–19, 20–20, 26–15

Boris Trajkovski Sports Center, Skopje
Attendance: 50

7 August 2026
13:30

Boxscore

Denmark	82–89	Estonia
Scoring by quarter: 20–18, 16–22, 20–23, 26–26

Boris Trajkovski Sports Center, Skopje
Attendance: 50

7 August 2026
16:00

Boxscore

Hungary	75–63	Austria
Scoring by quarter: 27–11, 15–12, 14–12, 19–28

Boris Trajkovski Sports Center, Skopje
Attendance: 50

8 August 2026
11:00

Boxscore

Great Britain	71–66	Hungary
Scoring by quarter: 15–17, 13–17, 18–17, 25–15

Boris Trajkovski Sports Center, Skopje
Attendance: 50

8 August 2026
13:30

Boxscore

Austria	79–62	Denmark
Scoring by quarter: 21–15, 21–17, 16–13, 21–17

Boris Trajkovski Sports Center, Skopje
Attendance: 50

10 August 2026
11:00

Boxscore

Estonia	66–45	Austria
Scoring by quarter: 17–15, 17–11, 17–7, 15–12

Boris Trajkovski Sports Center, Skopje
Attendance: 50

10 August 2026
16:00

Boxscore

Denmark	84–63	Great Britain
Scoring by quarter: 15–20, 22–15, 28–19, 19–9

Boris Trajkovski Sports Center, Skopje
Attendance: 50

11 August 2026
16:00

Boxscore

Great Britain	77–69	Estonia
Scoring by quarter: 18–19, 19–14, 19–16, 21–20

Boris Trajkovski Sports Center, Skopje
Attendance: 50

11 August 2026
21:00

Boxscore

Hungary	95–68	Denmark
Scoring by quarter: 28–16, 31–17, 18–20, 18–15

Boris Trajkovski Sports Center, Skopje
Attendance: 50

== 17th–22nd place classification ==
=== Group E ===
Pos	Team	Pld	W	L	PF	PA	PD	Pts	Qualification
1	Portugal	2	2	0	165	125	+40	4	17th place match
2	Cyprus	2	1	1	130	119	+11	3	19th place match
3	Switzerland	2	0	2	103	154	−51	2	21st place match

Source: FIBA

Note: The following match was carried over from the first round: CYP vs. SUI 64–44.

13 August 2026
18:30

Boxscore

Switzerland	59–90	Portugal
Scoring by quarter: 15–21, 15–21, 13–17, 16–31

Sports Hall "26th April", Gevgelija

14 August 2026
18:30

Boxscore

Portugal	75–66	Cyprus
Scoring by quarter: 15–13, 18–16, 18–16, 24–21

Sports Hall "26th April", Gevgelija
Attendance: 50

=== Group F ===
Pos	Team	Pld	W	L	PF	PA	PD	Pts	Qualification
1	Denmark	2	2	0	179	130	+49	4	17th place match
2	Norway	2	1	1	169	149	+20	3	19th place match
3	Luxembourg	2	0	2	103	172	−69	2	21st place match

Source: FIBA

Note: The following match was carried over from the first round: LUX vs. NOR 54–88.

13 August 2026
21:00

Boxscore

Luxembourg	49–84	Denmark
Scoring by quarter: 16–23, 15–17, 6–19, 12–25

Sports Hall "26th April", Gevgelija
Attendance: 50

14 August 2026
21:00

Boxscore

Denmark	95–81	Norway
Scoring by quarter: 22–20, 30–24, 24–16, 19–21

Sports Hall "26th April", Gevgelija
Attendance: 50

=== 21st place match ===
15 August 2026
18:00

Boxscore

Switzerland	100–80	Luxembourg
Scoring by quarter: 23–11, 33–19, 25–22, 19–28

Sports Hall "26th April", Gevgelija
Attendance: 50

=== 19th place match ===
15 August 2026
13:00

Boxscore

Cyprus	79–60	Norway
Scoring by quarter: 27–19, 23–14, 14–15, 15–12

Sports Hall "26th April", Gevgelija
Attendance: 50

=== 17th place match ===
15 August 2026
15:30

Boxscore

Portugal	71–86	Denmark
Scoring by quarter: 17–16, 22–19, 14–23, 18–28

Sports Hall "26th April", Gevgelija
Attendance: 50

== 9th–16th place playoffs ==
13th place match
North Macedonia	62
Bulgaria	102
15th place match
Hungary	88
Ukraine	64

13th–16th place semifinals
North Macedonia	95
Hungary	76
Ukraine	73
Bulgaria	78

9th–16th place quarterfinals
A3	Ireland	83
B4	North Macedonia	58
D3	Hungary	79
C4	Finland	87
B3	Ukraine	66
A4	Slovakia	95
C3	Bulgaria	71
D4	Austria	74

9th–12th place semifinals
Ireland	62
Finland	72
Slovakia	73
Austria	49

9th place match
Finland	88
Slovakia	83
11th place match
Ireland	75
Austria	64

=== 9th–16th place quarterfinals ===
13 August 2026
13:30

Boxscore

Ukraine	66–95	Slovakia
Scoring by quarter: 22–33, 17–23, 13–20, 14–19

Boris Trajkovski Sports Center, Skopje
Attendance: 50

13 August 2026
16:00

Boxscore

Bulgaria	71–74	Austria
Scoring by quarter: 13–14, 20–13, 21–19, 17–28

Boris Trajkovski Sports Center, Skopje
Attendance: 50

13 August 2026
18:30

Boxscore

Ireland	83–58	North Macedonia
Scoring by quarter: 20–19, 17–16, 25–8, 21–15

Boris Trajkovski Sports Center, Skopje
Attendance: 500

13 August 2026
21:00

Boxscore

Hungary	79–87	Finland
Scoring by quarter: 21–28, 14–21, 15–20, 29–18

Boris Trajkovski Sports Center, Skopje
Attendance: 50

=== 13th–16th place semifinals ===
14 August 2026
13:30

Boxscore

Ukraine	73–78	Bulgaria
Scoring by quarter: 22–13, 12–25, 15–22, 24–18

Boris Trajkovski Sports Center, Skopje
Attendance: 50

14 August 2026
16:00

Boxscore

North Macedonia	95–76	Hungary
Scoring by quarter: 17–21, 19–32, 33–15, 26–8

Boris Trajkovski Sports Center, Skopje
Attendance: 50

==== 15th place match ====
15 August 2026
11:30

Boxscore

Hungary	88–64	Ukraine
Scoring by quarter: 20–18, 18–23, 24–17, 26–6

Boris Trajkovski Sports Center, Skopje
Attendance: 50

==== 13th place match ====
15 August 2026
14:00

Boxscore

North Macedonia	62–102	Bulgaria
Scoring by quarter: 15–24, 14–30, 16–24, 17–24

Boris Trajkovski Sports Center, Skopje
Attendance: 50

=== 9th–12th place semifinals ===
14 August 2026
18:30

Boxscore

Slovakia	73–49	Austria
Scoring by quarter: 19–10, 23–11, 24–9, 7–19

Boris Trajkovski Sports Center, Skopje
Attendance: 50

14 August 2026
21:00

Boxscore

Ireland	62–72	Finland
Scoring by quarter: 13–8, 17–25, 21–12, 11–27

Boris Trajkovski Sports Center, Skopje
Attendance: 50

==== 11th place match ====
15 August 2026
16:30

Boxscore

Ireland	75–64	Austria
Scoring by quarter: 14–18, 13–23, 20–16, 28–7

Boris Trajkovski Sports Center, Skopje
Attendance: 50

==== 9th place match ====
15 August 2026
19:00

Boxscore

Finland	88–83	Slovakia
Scoring by quarter: 22–23, 24–21, 17–23, 25–16

Boris Trajkovski Sports Center, Skopje
Attendance: 50

== Championship playoffs ==
5th place match
Montenegro	71
Netherlands	74
7th place match
Great Britain	104
Sweden	89

5th–8th place semifinals
Montenegro	83
Great Britain	71
Netherlands	76
Sweden	66

Quarterfinals
A1	Montenegro	69
B2	Iceland	91
D1	Great Britain	73
C2	Bosnia and Herzegovina	83
B1	Croatia	80
A2	Netherlands	51
C1	Sweden	70
D2	Estonia	86

Semifinals
Iceland	95
Bosnia and Herzegovina	51
Croatia	87
Estonia	62

Final
Iceland	67
Croatia	69
3rd place match
Bosnia and Herzegovina	67
Estonia	83

=== Quarterfinals ===
13 August 2026
13:30

Boxscore

Montenegro	69–91	Iceland
Scoring by quarter: 11–21, 26–20, 20–21, 12–29

Sports Hall "26th April", Gevgelija

13 August 2026
16:00

Boxscore

Great Britain	73–83 (OT)	Bosnia and Herzegovina
Scoring by quarter: 12–6, 22–19, 13–23, 19–18, Overtime: 7–17

Sports Hall "26th April", Gevgelija

13 August 2026
18:30

Boxscore

Croatia	80–51	Netherlands
Scoring by quarter: 27–10, 13–17, 16–8, 24–16

Sports Hall "26th April", Gevgelija

13 August 2026
21:00

Boxscore

Sweden	70–86	Estonia
Scoring by quarter: 12–21, 19–27, 17–20, 22–18

Sports Hall "26th April", Gevgelija

=== 5th–8th place semifinals ===
14 August 2026
13:30

Boxscore

Montenegro	83–71	Great Britain
Scoring by quarter: 20–27, 20–14, 25–14, 18–16

Sports Hall "26th April", Gevgelija
Attendance: 50

14 August 2026
16:00

Boxscore

Netherlands	76–66	Sweden
Scoring by quarter: 29–24, 11–8, 15–18, 21–16

Sports Hall "26th April", Gevgelija
Attendance: 50

==== 7th place match ====
15 August 2026
13:30

Boxscore

Great Britain	104–89	Sweden
Scoring by quarter: 29–18, 30–30, 24–19, 21–22

Sports Hall "26th April", Gevgelija
Attendance: 50

==== 5th place match ====
15 August 2026
16:00

Boxscore

Montenegro	71–74	Netherlands
Scoring by quarter: 28–15, 17–17, 19–22, 7–20

Sports Hall "26th April", Gevgelija
Attendance: 50

=== Semifinals ===
14 August 2026
18:30

Boxscore

Iceland	95–51	Bosnia and Herzegovina
Scoring by quarter: 19-15, 18–15, 22–6, 29–15

Sports Hall "26th April", Gevgelija
Attendance: 100

14 August 2026
21:00

Boxscore

Croatia	87–62	Estonia
Scoring by quarter: 24–15, 17–21, 22–16, 24–10

Sports Hall "26th April", Gevgelija
Attendance: 200

==== 3rd place match ====
15 August 2026
18:30

Boxscore

Bosnia and Herzegovina	67–83	Estonia
Scoring by quarter: 18–16, 22–25, 13–25, 14–17

Sports Hall "26th April", Gevgelija
Attendance: 100

==== Final ====
15 August 2026
21:00

Boxscore

Iceland	67–69	Croatia
Scoring by quarter: 12–17, 26–23, 17–14, 12–15

Sports Hall "26th April", Gevgelija
Attendance: 400

== Final standings ==
Rank	Team	Record
1st place, gold medalist(s)	Croatia	8–0
2nd place, silver medalist(s)	Iceland	6–2
3rd place, bronze medalist(s)	Estonia	5–2
4	Bosnia and Herzegovina	5–3
5	Netherlands	5–2
6	Montenegro	4–3
7	Great Britain	4–3
8	Sweden	4–4
9	Finland	6–2
10	Slovakia	4–3
11	Ireland	4–3
12	Austria	2–5
13	Bulgaria	5–3
14	North Macedonia	3–5
15	Hungary	3–4
16	Ukraine	3–5
17	Denmark	4–3
18	Portugal	2–5
19	Cyprus	2–5
20	Norway	1–6
21	Switzerland	1–6
22	Luxembourg	0–7

Promoted to the 2027 FIBA U16 EuroBasket Division A
Relegated to the 2027 FIBA U16 EuroBasket Division C
