= 2023 FIBA U16 European Championship Division B =

Tournament details
- Host country: Romania
- City: Pitești
- Dates: 4–13 August 2023
- Teams: 21 (from 1 confederation)
- Venue(s): 3 (in 1 host city)

Final positions
- Champions: Croatia (1st title)
- Runners-up: Bulgaria
- Third place: Georgia

Official website
- www.fiba.basketball/history

The 2023 FIBA U16 European Championship Division B was the 18th edition of the Division B of the European basketball championship for men's national under-16 teams. The tournament was played from 4 to 13 August 2023 in Pitești, Romania.

== Participating teams ==
- Austria
- Bosnia and Herzegovina
- Bulgaria
- Croatia ▼ (14th place, 2022 FIBA U16 European Championship Division A)
- Czech Republic
- Denmark ▼ (16th place, 2022 FIBA U16 European Championship Division A)
- Estonia
- Georgia
- Great Britain
- Hungary
- Iceland
- Ireland
- Luxembourg
- Netherlands ▼ (15th place, 2022 FIBA U16 European Championship Division A)
- Norway
- Portugal
- Romania
- Slovakia
- Sweden
- Switzerland
- Ukraine

== First round ==
The draw of the first round was held on 14 February 2023 in Freising, Germany.

In the first round, the teams were drawn into four groups. The first two teams from each group advanced to the quarterfinals; the third and fourth teams advanced to the 9th–16th place playoffs; the other teams advanced to the 17th–21st place classification groups.

All times are local (Eastern European Summer Time – UTC+3).

=== Group A ===
Pos	Team	Pld	W	L	PF	PA	PD	Pts	Qualification
1	Romania	4	4	0	297	268	+29	8	Quarterfinals
2	Georgia	4	3	1	329	263	+66	7	Quarterfinals
3	Iceland	4	2	2	322	332	−10	6	9th–16th place playoffs
4	Bosnia and Herzegovina	4	1	3	279	304	−25	5	9th–16th place playoffs
5	Austria	4	0	4	271	331	−60	4	17th–21st place classification

Source: FIBA

4 August 2023
18:00

Boxscore

Romania	72–50	Austria
Scoring by quarter: 16–12, 20–11, 19–17, 17–10

Pitești Arena, Pitești

4 August 2023
20:30

Boxscore

Bosnia and Herzegovina	62–73	Iceland
Scoring by quarter: 17–15, 16–15, 12–24, 17–19

Pitești Arena, Pitești

5 August 2023
18:00

Boxscore

Iceland	88–90	Romania
Scoring by quarter: 21–9, 20–34, 24–28, 23–19

Pitești Arena, Pitești

5 August 2023
18:00

Boxscore

Georgia	90–61	Bosnia and Herzegovina
Scoring by quarter: 25–14, 24–17, 17–16, 24–14

Universitatea Sport Hall, Pitești

6 August 2023
18:00

Boxscore

Romania	66–62	Georgia
Scoring by quarter: 15–19, 22–12, 12–16, 17–15

Pitești Arena, Pitești

6 August 2023
18:00

Boxscore

Austria	84–90	Iceland
Scoring by quarter: 29–29, 17–21, 15–23, 23–17

Universitatea Sport Hall, Pitești

8 August 2023
15:30

Boxscore

Georgia	81–65	Austria
Scoring by quarter: 14–17, 25–16, 28–17, 14–15

Sala Sporturilor, Pitești

8 August 2023
18:00

Boxscore

Bosnia and Herzegovina	68–69	Romania
Scoring by quarter: 15–16, 22–18, 13–16, 18–19

Pitești Arena, Pitești

9 August 2023
15:30

Boxscore

Iceland	71–96	Georgia
Scoring by quarter: 16–24, 10–19, 28–21, 17–32

Pitești Arena, Pitești

9 August 2023
15:30

Boxscore

Austria	72–88	Bosnia and Herzegovina
Scoring by quarter: 20–14, 15–20, 25–24, 12–30

Pitești Arena, Pitești

=== Group B ===
Pos	Team	Pld	W	L	PF	PA	PD	Pts	Qualification
1	Estonia	4	4	0	324	228	+96	8	Quarterfinals
2	Hungary	4	3	1	323	223	+100	7	Quarterfinals
3	Ukraine	4	2	2	223	246	−23	6	9th–16th place playoffs
4	Great Britain	4	1	3	272	276	−4	5	9th–16th place playoffs
5	Norway	4	0	4	213	382	−169	4	17th–21st place classification

Source: FIBA

4 August 2023
13:00

Boxscore

Ukraine	61–52	Norway
Scoring by quarter: 13–17, 17–23, 20–8, 11–4

Pitești Arena, Pitești

4 August 2023
15:30

Boxscore

Estonia	86–55	Great Britain
Scoring by quarter: 24–11, 24–21, 19–11, 19–12

Pitești Arena, Pitești

5 August 2023
15:30

Boxscore

Hungary	67–69	Estonia
Scoring by quarter: 16–18, 13–25, 17–13, 21–13

Universitatea Sport Hall, Pitești

5 August 2023
20:30

Boxscore

Great Britain	57–59	Ukraine
Scoring by quarter: 11–18, 16–12, 11–10, 19–19

Sala Sporturilor, Pitești

6 August 2023
15:30

Boxscore

Ukraine	53–71	Hungary
Scoring by quarter: 9–20, 12–12, 13–18, 19–21

Pitești Arena, Pitești

6 August 2023
15:30

Boxscore

Norway	64–100	Great Britain
Scoring by quarter: 16–28, 12–26, 11–22, 25–24

Universitatea Sport Hall, Pitești

8 August 2023
18:00

Boxscore

Estonia	66–50	Ukraine
Scoring by quarter: 19–8, 20–11, 18–14, 9–17

Sala Sporturilor, Pitești

8 August 2023
20:30

Boxscore

Hungary	118–41	Norway
Scoring by quarter: 29–12, 25–8, 36–9, 28–12

Sala Sporturilor, Pitești

9 August 2023
18:00

Boxscore

Great Britain	60–67	Hungary
Scoring by quarter: 12–19, 24–14, 14–20, 10–14

Pitești Arena, Pitești

9 August 2023
20:30

Boxscore

Norway	56–103	Estonia
Scoring by quarter: 18–26, 11–29, 11–26, 16–22

Sala Sporturilor, Pitești

=== Group C ===
Pos	Team	Pld	W	L	PF	PA	PD	Pts	Qualification
1	Croatia	5	5	0	441	280	+161	10	Quarterfinals
2	Czech Republic	5	4	1	369	340	+29	9	Quarterfinals
3	Denmark	5	3	2	409	333	+76	8	9th–16th place playoffs
4	Luxembourg	5	2	3	385	472	−87	7	9th–16th place playoffs
5	Switzerland	5	1	4	292	381	−89	6	17th–21st place classification
6	Ireland	5	0	5	209	299	−90	5	17th–21st place classification

Source: FIBA

4 August 2023
18:00

Boxscore

Denmark	68–85	Croatia
Scoring by quarter: 17–25, 16–29, 17–17, 18–14

Universitatea Sport Hall, Pitești

4 August 2023
18:00

Boxscore

Luxembourg	71–64	Switzerland
Scoring by quarter: 22–11, 11–27, 18–16, 20–10

Sala Sporturilor, Pitești

4 August 2023
20:30

Boxscore

Ireland	48–71	Czech Republic
Scoring by quarter: 16–20, 16–17, 8–20, 8–14

Sala Sporturilor, Pitești

5 August 2023
13:00

Boxscore

Croatia	80–58	Luxembourg
Scoring by quarter: 22–15, 21–17, 21–11, 16–15

Pitești Arena, Pitești

5 August 2023
15:30

Boxscore

Switzerland	64–47	Ireland
Scoring by quarter: 16–4, 16–12, 10–15, 22–16

Pitești Arena, Pitești

5 August 2023
20:30

Boxscore

Czech Republic	79–63	Denmark
Scoring by quarter: 23–18, 15–20, 21–16, 20–9

Pitești Arena, Pitești

6 August 2023
15:30

Boxscore

Croatia	90–38	Switzerland
Scoring by quarter: 20–10, 20–8, 31–11, 19–9

Sala Sporturilor, Pitești

6 August 2023
18:00

Boxscore

Luxembourg	77–80	Czech Republic
Scoring by quarter: 16–17, 20–17, 15–27, 26–19

Sala Sporturilor, Pitești

6 August 2023
20:30

Boxscore

Denmark	89–58	Ireland
Scoring by quarter: 29–15, 22–8, 17–21, 21–14

Sala Sporturilor, Pitești

8 August 2023
13:00

Boxscore

Switzerland	67–90	Denmark
Scoring by quarter: 18–22, 14–25, 20–17, 15–26

Pitești Arena, Pitești

8 August 2023
15:30

Boxscore

Czech Republic	56–93	Croatia
Scoring by quarter: 10–26, 19–15, 12–28, 15–24

Pitești Arena, Pitești

8 August 2023
20:30

Boxscore

Ireland	56–75	Luxembourg
Scoring by quarter: 24–11, 6–22, 13–19, 13–23

Pitești Arena, Pitești

9 August 2023
15:30

Boxscore

Luxembourg	44–99	Denmark
Scoring by quarter: 10–28, 19–25, 7–27, 8–19

Universitatea Sport Hall, Pitești

9 August 2023
18:00

Boxscore

Croatia	93–60	Ireland
Scoring by quarter: 26–9, 27–14, 15–21, 25–16

Sala Sporturilor, Pitești

9 August 2023
18:00

Boxscore

Czech Republic	83–59	Switzerland
Scoring by quarter: 19–18, 10–16, 27–12, 27–13

Universitatea Sport Hall, Pitești

=== Group D ===
Pos	Team	Pld	W	L	PF	PA	PD	Pts	Qualification
1	Bulgaria	4	4	0	298	250	+48	8	Quarterfinals
2	Slovakia	4	3	1	321	270	+51	7	Quarterfinals
3	Sweden	4	2	2	259	289	−30	6	9th–16th place playoffs
4	Portugal	4	1	3	255	266	−11	5	9th–16th place playoffs
5	Netherlands	4	0	4	201	259	−58	4	17th–21st place classification

Source: FIBA

4 August 2023
15:30

Boxscore

Netherlands	47–63	Bulgaria
Scoring by quarter: 14–15, 13–11, 8–17, 12–20

Universitatea Sport Hall, Pitești

4 August 2023
15:30

Boxscore

Portugal	74–79	Slovakia
Scoring by quarter: 10–21, 22–21, 21–16, 21–21

Sala Sporturilor, Pitești

5 August 2023
15:30

Boxscore

Sweden	66–57	Netherlands
Scoring by quarter: 23–14, 12–18, 10–11, 21–14

Sala Sporturilor, Pitești

5 August 2023
18:00

Boxscore

Bulgaria	70–59	Portugal
Scoring by quarter: 20–15, 12–14, 20–15, 18–15

Sala Sporturilor, Pitești

6 August 2023
13:00

Boxscore

Slovakia	78–89	Bulgaria
Scoring by quarter: 19–9, 35–25, 18–24, 6–31

Pitești Arena, Pitești

6 August 2023
20:30

Boxscore

Portugal	61–68	Sweden
Scoring by quarter: 14–14, 15–20, 19–13, 13–21

Pitești Arena, Pitești

8 August 2023
15:30

Boxscore

Sweden	59–95	Slovakia
Scoring by quarter: 22–36, 12–25, 15–22, 10–12

Universitatea Sport Hall, Pitești

8 August 2023
18:00

Boxscore

Netherlands	49–61	Portugal
Scoring by quarter: 15–12, 13–19, 11–13, 10–17

Universitatea Sport Hall, Pitești

9 August 2023
13:00

Boxscore

Bulgaria	76–66	Sweden
Scoring by quarter: 22–15, 29–19, 10–16, 15–16

Pitești Arena, Pitești

9 August 2023
20:30

Boxscore

Slovakia	69–48	Netherlands
Scoring by quarter: 15–7, 15–17, 17–11, 22–13

Pitești Arena, Pitești

== 17th–21st place classification ==
=== Group E ===
Pos	Team	Pld	W	L	PF	PA	PD	Pts	Qualification
1	Netherlands	2	2	0	157	116	+41	4	17th place match
2	Switzerland	2	1	1	120	127	−7	3	19th place match
3	Ireland	2	0	2	107	141	−34	2	21st place

Source: FIBA

11 August 2023
18:00

Boxscore

Ireland	60–77	Netherlands
Scoring by quarter: 13–23, 8–20, 24–16, 15–18

Universitatea Sport Hall, Pitești

12 August 2023
18:00

Boxscore

Netherlands	80–56	Switzerland
Scoring by quarter: 20–10, 23–12, 20–17, 17–17

Universitatea Sport Hall, Pitești

=== Group F ===
11 August 2023
15:30

Boxscore

Austria	89–58	Norway
Scoring by quarter: 20–19, 29–13, 23–17, 17–9

Universitatea Sport Hall, Pitești

- Austria advance to the 17th place match; Norway advance to the 19th place match.

=== 19th place match ===
13 August 2023
13:30

Boxscore

Norway	73–85	Switzerland
Scoring by quarter: 9–25, 16–21, 18–15, 30–24

Universitatea Sport Hall, Pitești

=== 17th place match ===
13 August 2023
16:00

Boxscore

Austria	58–76	Netherlands
Scoring by quarter: 18–17, 10–23, 11–20, 19–16

Universitatea Sport Hall, Pitești

== 9th–16th place playoffs ==
13th place match
Luxembourg	63
Portugal	69
15th place match
Iceland	83
Ukraine	72

13th–16th place semifinals
Iceland	71
Luxembourg	88
Ukraine	66
Portugal	73

9th–16th place quarterfinals
A3	Iceland	63
B4	Great Britain	83
D3	Sweden	71
C4	Luxembourg	63
B3	Ukraine	63
A4	Bosnia and Herzegovina	73
C3	Denmark	72
D4	Portugal	66

9th–12th place semifinals
Great Britain	69
Sweden	64
Bosnia and Herzegovina	82
Denmark	86

9th place match
Great Britain	69
Denmark	83
11th place match
Sweden	61
Bosnia and Herzegovina	65

=== 9th–16th place quarterfinals ===
11 August 2023
13:00

Boxscore

Iceland	63–83	Great Britain
Scoring by quarter: 20–21, 12–26, 18–22, 13–14

Sala Sporturilor, Pitești

11 August 2023
15:30

Boxscore

Sweden	71–63	Luxembourg
Scoring by quarter: 14–12, 13–16, 18–16, 26–19

Sala Sporturilor, Pitești

11 August 2023
18:00

Boxscore

Ukraine	63–73	Bosnia and Herzegovina
Scoring by quarter: 12–17, 11–14, 12–19, 28–23

Sala Sporturilor, Pitești

11 August 2023
20:30

Boxscore

Denmark	72–66	Portugal
Scoring by quarter: 14–17, 17–15, 21–20, 20–14

Sala Sporturilor, Pitești

=== 13th–16th place semifinals ===
12 August 2023
13:00

Boxscore

Iceland	71–88	Luxembourg
Scoring by quarter: 17–23, 16–23, 18–17, 20–25

Sala Sporturilor, Pitești

12 August 2023
15:30

Boxscore

Ukraine	66–73	Portugal
Scoring by quarter: 19–16, 6–28, 19–15, 22–14

Sala Sporturilor, Pitești

=== 15th place match ===
13 August 2023
11:00

Boxscore

Iceland	83–72	Ukraine
Scoring by quarter: 22–17, 25–21, 21–18, 15–16

Sala Sporturilor, Pitești

=== 13th place match ===
13 August 2023
13:30

Boxscore

Luxembourg	63–69	Portugal
Scoring by quarter: 17–17, 18–19, 15–19, 13–14

Sala Sporturilor, Pitești

=== 9th–12th place semifinals ===
12 August 2023
18:00

Boxscore

Great Britain	69–64	Sweden
Scoring by quarter: 12–24, 13–10, 18–15, 26–15

Sala Sporturilor, Pitești

12 August 2023
20:30

Boxscore

Bosnia and Herzegovina	82–86	Denmark
Scoring by quarter: 20–26, 22–20, 23–17, 17–23

Sala Sporturilor, Pitești

=== 11th place match ===
13 August 2023
16:00

Boxscore

Sweden	61–65	Bosnia and Herzegovina
Scoring by quarter: 10–11, 17–25, 21–16, 13–13

Sala Sporturilor, Pitești

=== 9th place match ===
13 August 2023
18:30

Boxscore

Great Britain	69–83	Denmark
Scoring by quarter: 18–23, 12–19, 20–17, 19–24

Sala Sporturilor, Pitești

== Championship playoffs ==
5th place match
Hungary	73
Estonia	68
7th place match
Czech Republic	53
Slovakia	65

5th–8th place semifinals
Hungary	79
Czech Republic	55
Estonia	71
Slovakia	66

Quarterfinals
A1	Romania (OT)	83
B2	Hungary	73
D1	Bulgaria	81
C2	Czech Republic	54
B1	Estonia	66
A2	Georgia	79
C1	Croatia	85
D2	Slovakia	35

Semifinals
Romania	56
Bulgaria	67
Georgia	65
Croatia	82

Final
Bulgaria	67
Croatia	85
3rd place match
Romania	68
Georgia	70

=== Quarterfinals ===
11 August 2023
13:00

Boxscore

Estonia	66–79	Georgia
Scoring by quarter: 24–11, 11–17, 13–24, 18–27

Pitești Arena, Pitești

11 August 2023
15:30

Boxscore

Croatia	85–35	Slovakia
Scoring by quarter: 30–6, 23–6, 20–10, 12–13

Pitești Arena, Pitești

11 August 2023
18:00

Boxscore

Romania	83–73 (OT)	Hungary
Scoring by quarter: 21–18, 18–18, 18–22, 16–15, Overtime: 10–0

Pitești Arena, Pitești

11 August 2023
20:30

Boxscore

Bulgaria	81–54	Czech Republic
Scoring by quarter: 19–12, 19–13, 25–13, 18–16

Pitești Arena, Pitești

=== 5th–8th place semifinals ===
12 August 2023
13:00

Boxscore

Estonia	71–66	Slovakia
Scoring by quarter: 19–16, 27–24, 8–18, 17–8

Pitești Arena, Pitești

12 August 2023
15:30

Boxscore

Hungary	79–55	Czech Republic
Scoring by quarter: 22–9, 20–16, 22–16, 15–14

Pitești Arena, Pitești

=== 7th place match ===
13 August 2023
13:00

Boxscore

Czech Republic	53–65	Slovakia
Scoring by quarter: 13–20, 12–14, 14–15, 14–16

Pitești Arena, Pitești

=== 5th place match ===
13 August 2023
15:30

Boxscore

Hungary	73–68	Estonia
Scoring by quarter: 19–12, 19–22, 14–11, 21–23

Pitești Arena, Pitești

=== Semifinals ===
12 August 2023
18:00

Boxscore

Romania	56–67	Bulgaria
Scoring by quarter: 17–14, 11–19, 16–15, 12–19

Pitești Arena, Pitești

12 August 2023
20:30

Boxscore

Georgia	65–82	Croatia
Scoring by quarter: 8–22, 16–25, 19–19, 22–16

Pitești Arena, Pitești

=== 3rd place match ===
13 August 2023
18:00

Boxscore

Romania	68–70	Georgia
Scoring by quarter: 16–12, 25–28, 6–15, 21–15

Pitești Arena, Pitești

=== Final ===
13 August 2023
20:30

Boxscore

Bulgaria	67–85	Croatia
Scoring by quarter: 14–26, 16–21, 24–20, 13–18

Pitești Arena, Pitești

== Final standings ==
Rank	Team
1st place, gold medalist(s)	Croatia
2nd place, silver medalist(s)	Bulgaria
3rd place, bronze medalist(s)	Georgia
4	Romania
5	Hungary
6	Estonia
7	Slovakia
8	Czech Republic
9	Denmark
10	Great Britain
11	Bosnia and Herzegovina
12	Sweden
13	Portugal
14	Luxembourg
15	Iceland
16	Ukraine
17	Netherlands
18	Austria
19	Switzerland
20	Norway
21	Ireland

Promoted to the 2024 FIBA U16 EuroBasket Division A
