= 2024 FIBA U16 EuroBasket Division B =

International youth basketball tournament

Tournament details
- Host country: North Macedonia
- City: Skopje
- Dates: 8–17 August 2024
- Teams: 22 (from 1 confederation)
- Venue(s): 2 (in 1 host city)

Final positions
- Champions: Estonia (2nd title)
- Runners-up: Romania
- Third place: Switzerland
- Fourth place: Belgium

Tournament statistics
- Games played: 81
- Attendance: 8,830 (109 per game)
- MVP: (Estonia) Roman Avdejev
- Top scorer: (Romania) David-Ioan Rasoga (20.9 points per game)

Official website
- www.fiba.basketball

The 2024 FIBA U16 EuroBasket Division B was the 19th edition of the Division B of the European basketball championship for men's under-16 national teams. The tournament was played in Skopje, North Macedonia, from 8 to 17 August 2024.

== Participating teams ==
- Austria
- Belgium ▼ (15th place, 2023 FIBA U16 European Championship Division A)
- Bosnia and Herzegovina
- Cyprus ▲ (Winners, 2023 FIBA U16 European Championship Division C)
- Czech Republic
- Denmark
- Estonia
- Great Britain
- Hungary
- Iceland
- Ireland
- Luxembourg
- Montenegro ▼ (14th place, 2023 FIBA U16 European Championship Division A)
- Netherlands
- North Macedonia ▼ (16th place, 2023 FIBA U16 European Championship Division A)
- Norway
- Portugal
- Romania
- Slovakia
- Sweden
- Switzerland
- Ukraine

== First round ==
The draw of the first round was held on 6 February 2024 in Freising, Germany.

In the first round, the teams were drawn into four groups. The first two teams from each group advanced to the quarterfinals; the third and fourth teams advanced to the 9th–16th place playoffs; the other teams advanced to the 17th–22nd place classification.

All times are local (Central European Summer Time – UTC+2).

=== Group A ===
Pos	Team	Pld	W	L	PF	PA	PD	Pts	Qualification
1	Belgium	4	4	0	314	246	+68	8	Quarterfinals
2	Switzerland	4	3	1	302	256	+46	7	Quarterfinals
3	Portugal	4	1	3	269	316	−47	5	9th–16th place playoffs
4	Hungary	4	1	3	284	314	−30	5	9th–16th place playoffs
5	Bosnia and Herzegovina	4	1	3	289	326	−37	5	17th–22nd place classification

Source: FIBA

8 August 2024
13:30

Boxscore

Portugal	52–82	Belgium
Scoring by quarter: 11–16, 11–19, 16–26, 14–21
Pts: Sousa 11; Rebs: Queiroz, Oliveira 6 Asts: Greno 5		Pts: Ona Embo 22; Rebs: Three players 4 Asts: Ona Embo 5

Sports Centre Boris Trajkovski
Attendance: 30
Referees: Rainis Värv (EST), Ioannis Agrafiotis (GRE), Frane Mjeda (CRO)

8 August 2024
16:00

Boxscore

Switzerland	77–69	Hungary
Scoring by quarter: 27–23, 10–21, 21–14, 19–11
Pts: Serreau 24; Rebs: Rebetez 10; Asts: Cokara 4		Pts: Bartik 21; Rebs: Asztalos 9 Asts: Puskas 11

Sports Centre Boris Trajkovski
Attendance: 50
Referees: Sergiy Chaykovskyy (UKR), Orhan Cagri Hekimoglu (TUR), Ngadhnjim Shabani (KOS)

9 August 2024
11:00

Boxscore

Bosnia and Herzegovina	66–85	Switzerland
Scoring by quarter: 16–25, 20–21, 8–18, 22–21
Pts: Subašić 18; Rebs: Frljučkić 10; Asts: Subašić 5		Pts: Serreau 22; Rebs: Rebetez, Zumstein 9 Asts: Cokara 5

SRC Kale
Attendance: 100
Referees: Alin Faur (ROU), Pierre Landy (FRA), Ngadhnjim Shabani (KOS)

9 August 2024
13:30

Boxscore

Hungary	76–85	Portugal
Scoring by quarter: 18–21, 15–17, 15–15, 28–32
Pts: Asztalos 17; Rebs: Asztalos, Kurfis 10; Asts: Gaspar 5		Pts: Prado 18; Rebs: Teixeira 12; Asts: Greno 8

SRC Kale
Attendance: 50
Referees: Marek Kukelcik (SVK), Andrej Zlatevski (MKD), Urfan Bayramli (AZE)

10 August 2024
11:00

Boxscore

Belgium	84–57	Hungary
Scoring by quarter: 19–7, 32–20, 13–17, 20–13
Pts: Ona Embo 18; Rebs: Havyarimana 7 Asts: Ona Embo 4		Pts: Kurfis 17; Rebs: Asztalos 11; Asts: Gaspar 4

SRC Kale
Attendance: 100
Referees: Rainis Värv (EST), Pierre Landy (FRA), Dumitru Stasiev (MDA)

10 August 2024
21:00

Boxscore

Portugal	76–79	Bosnia and Herzegovina
Scoring by quarter: 19–11, 25–28, 21–20, 11–20
Pts: Conceicao 20; Rebs: Teixeira 8 Asts: Sousa 6		Pts: Šipković 27; Rebs: Preldžić 9 Asts: Preldžić 7

Sports Centre Boris Trajkovski
Attendance: 50
Referees: Zdenko Zubak (SVK), Sergiy Chaykovskyy (UKR), Frane Mjeda (CRO)

12 August 2024
16:00

Boxscore

Switzerland	79–56	Portugal
Scoring by quarter: 23–16, 15–13, 16–14, 25–13
Pts: Serreau, Cokara 19; Rebs: Rebetez 10; Asts: Zumstein 5		Pts: Sousa 11; Rebs: Sousa 6 Asts: Greno 4

SRC Kale
Attendance: 80
Referees: Alin Faur (ROU), Frane Mjeda (CRO), Serafim Petrov (BUL)

12 August 2024
18:30

Boxscore

Bosnia and Herzegovina	76–83	Belgium
Scoring by quarter: 25–26, 20–23, 17–17, 14–17
Pts: Preldzic 18; Rebs: Frljuckic 12; Asts: Sipkovic 7		Pts: Elocobe 21; Rebs: Swolfs 9 Asts: Ona Embo 8

Sports Centre Boris Trajkovski
Attendance: 50
Referees: Marek Kukelcik (SVK), Danilo Petkovic (SRB), Andrej Zlatevski (MKD)

13 August 2024
13:30

Boxscore

Belgium	65–61	Switzerland
Scoring by quarter: 13–14, 15–21, 18–13, 19–13
Pts: Kasongo 17; Rebs: Havyarimana 8 Asts: Waerniers 3		Pts: Rebetez 20; Rebs: Zumstein 15; Asts: Zumstein 4

SRC Kale
Attendance: 50
Referees: Zdenko Zubak (SVK), Michal Kuzia (POL), Filip Oliver Szczesny (NOR)

13 August 2024
21:00

Boxscore

Hungary	82–68	Bosnia and Herzegovina
Scoring by quarter: 19–19, 16–16, 23–13, 24–20
Pts: Kurfis 23; Rebs: Miklos Asztalos 16; Asts: Pavlik 6		Pts: Sipkovic 12; Rebs: Frljuckic 14; Asts: Milovanovic 3

SRC Kale
Attendance: 50
Referees: Alin Faur (ROU), Frane Mjeda (CRO), Danilo Petkovic (SRB)

=== Group B ===
Pos	Team	Pld	W	L	PF	PA	PD	Pts	Qualification
1	Montenegro	5	4	1	410	331	+79	9	Quarterfinals
2	Netherlands	5	4	1	358	299	+59	9	Quarterfinals
3	Czechia	5	4	1	344	324	+20	9	9th–16th place playoffs
4	Iceland	5	1	4	357	383	−26	6	9th–16th place playoffs
5	Cyprus	5	1	4	315	346	−31	6	17th–22nd place classification
6	Luxembourg	5	1	4	275	376	−101	6	17th–22nd place classification

Source: FIBA

8 August 2024
13:30

Boxscore

Cyprus	59–82	Netherlands
Scoring by quarter: 14–30, 14–23, 16–13, 15–16
Pts: Zinonos 15; Rebs: Constantinou 4 Asts: Three players 3		Pts: Slingerland 17; Rebs: Bergens 7 Asts: Anike 5

SRC Kale
Attendance: 100
Referees: Alin Faur (ROU), Pierre Landy (FRA), Aleksandar Radonjic (AUT)

8 August 2024
16:00

Boxscore

Montenegro	98–81	Iceland
Scoring by quarter: 29–21, 23–23, 19–17, 27–20
Pts: Stankovic, Mickovic 20; Rebs: Stankovic, Djukanovic 10; Asts: Vekovic 6		Pts: Bodvarsson 24; Rebs: Birmingham, Bodvarsson 6 Asts: Leifsson 10

SRC Kale
Attendance: 100
Referees: Marek Kukelcik (SVK), Skirmantas Letukas (DEN), Dumitru Stasiev (MDA)

8 August 2024
21:00

Boxscore

Czechia	72–55	Luxembourg
Scoring by quarter: 11–14, 17–13, 18–18, 26–10
Pts: Davidek 13; Rebs: Zalud, Buben 8 Asts: Zalud 6		Pts: Jungers 25; Rebs: Mc Swain 7 Asts: Jungers 4

Sports Centre Boris Trajkovski
Attendance: 30
Referees: Zdenko Zubak (SVK), Andrej Zlatevski (MKD), Filip Oliver Szczesny (NOR)

9 August 2024
11:00

Boxscore

Netherlands	74–73 (OT)	Montenegro
Scoring by quarter: 15–20, 31–18, 11–14, 13–18, Overtime: 4–3
Pts: Slingerland 18; Rebs: van der Heijden 9 Asts: Anike 6		Pts: Djukanovic 18; Rebs: Djukanovic 26; Asts: Three players 3

Sports Centre Boris Trajkovski
Attendance: 100
Referees: Zdenko Zubak (SVK), Orhan Cagri Hekimoglu (TUR), Serafim Petrov (BUL)

9 August 2024
16:00

Boxscore

Luxembourg	40–61	Cyprus
Scoring by quarter: 9–21, 16–11, 6–19, 9–10
Pts: Jungers 8 Rebs: Brosius 9 Asts: Seven players 1		Pts: Georgiou 15; Rebs: Solomou 9 Asts: Solomou 4

Sports Centre Boris Trajkovski
Attendance: 100
Referees: Rainis Värv (EST), Skirmantas Letukas (DEN), Vojkan Zivkovic (SRB)

9 August 2024
21:00

Boxscore

Iceland	63–78	Czechia
Scoring by quarter: 18–21, 11–23, 22–22, 12–12
Pts: Birmingham 13; Rebs: Birmingham, Leifsson 6 Asts: Birmingham, Leifsson 3		Pts: Nosek 17; Rebs: Nohel 13; Asts: Zalud, Nohel 4

SRC Kale
Attendance: 50
Referees: Sergiy Chaykovskyy (UKR), Filip Oliver Szczesny (NOR), Dumitru Stasiev (MDA)

10 August 2024
11:00

Boxscore

Luxembourg	41–79	Netherlands
Scoring by quarter: 8–18, 20–16, 7–23, 6–22
Pts: Sabotic 14; Rebs: Three players 4 Asts: Brosius 4		Pts: Bergens, Golubovic 12; Rebs: Besana 10; Asts: Golubovic 6

Sports Centre Boris Trajkovski
Attendance: 30
Referees: Michal Kuzia (POL), Filip Oliver Szczesny (NOR), Aleksandar Radonjic (AUT)

10 August 2024
16:00

Boxscore

Czechia	53–79	Montenegro
Scoring by quarter: 14–18, 11–21, 15–20, 13–20
Pts: Nohel 12; Rebs: Davidek 11; Asts: Zalud 3		Pts: Brnovic 20; Rebs: Djukanovic 17; Asts: Ivelja 8

Sports Centre Boris Trajkovski
Attendance: 100
Referees: Marek Kukelcik (SVK), Alin Faur (ROU), Andrej Zlatevski (MKD)

10 August 2024
18:30

Boxscore

Cyprus	60–76	Iceland
Scoring by quarter: 16–21, 6–19, 16–20, 22–16
Pts: Nicolaou 20; Rebs: Three players 5 Asts: Georgiou 5		Pts: Birmingham, Bodvarsson 12; Rebs: Steinsen 8 Asts: Leifsson 5

Sports Centre Boris Trajkovski
Attendance: 30
Referees: Ioannis Agrafiotis (GRE), Danilo Petkovic (SRB), Ngadhnjim Shabani (KOS)

12 August 2024
13:30

Boxscore

Montenegro	76–71	Cyprus
Scoring by quarter: 18–12, 17–17, 25–21, 16–21
Pts: Brnovic 15; Rebs: Djukanovic 12; Asts: Brnovic 6		Pts: Mikheev 20; Rebs: Mikheev 10; Asts: Mastoris 6

Sports Centre Boris Trajkovski
Attendance: 50
Referees: Zdenko Zubak (SVK), Filip Oliver Szczesny (NOR), Ngadhnjim Shabani (KOS)

12 August 2024
13:30

Boxscore

Iceland	80–87	Luxembourg
Scoring by quarter: 24–19, 16–21, 20–17, 20–30
Pts: Leifsson 22; Rebs: Oskarsson 6 Asts: Leifsson 9		Pts: Mc Leod 19; Rebs: Jungers 12; Asts: Jungers 5

SRC Kale
Attendance: 50
Referees: Orhan Cagri Hekimoglu (TUR), Pierre Landy (FRA), Aleksandar Radonjic (AUT)

12 August 2024
21:00

Boxscore

Netherlands	63–69	Czechia
Scoring by quarter: 18–14, 10–33, 23–10, 12–12
Pts: Slingerland 22; Rebs: Besana 10; Asts: Anike 5		Pts: Nosek 12; Rebs: Pospichal 9 Asts: Broda 4

Sports Centre Boris Trajkovski
Attendance: 80
Referees: Rainis Värv (EST), Skirmantas Letukas (DEN), Dumitru Stasiev (MDA)

13 August 2024
11:00

Boxscore

Luxembourg	52–84	Montenegro
Scoring by quarter: 20–22, 15–22, 9–21, 8–19
Pts: Mc Swain 20; Rebs: Jungers 7 Asts: Jungers 4		Pts: Vekovic 11; Rebs: Stankovic 11; Asts: Vekovic 4

Sports Centre Boris Trajkovski
Attendance: 50
Referees: Skirmantas Letukas (DEN), Rainis Värv (EST), Ngadhnjim Shabani (KOS)

13 August 2024
16:00

Boxscore

Cyprus	64–72	Czechia
Scoring by quarter: 17–15, 20–10, 13–25, 14–22
Pts: Nicolaou 15; Rebs: Foullides, Mastoris 7 Asts: Solomou 5		Pts: Nohel 15; Rebs: Nohel 12; Asts: Zalud, Brezik 4

SRC Kale
Attendance: 100
Referees: Pierre Landy (FRA), Aleksandar Radonjic (AUT), Dumitru Stasiev (MDA)

13 August 2024
18:30

Boxscore

Iceland	57–60	Netherlands
Scoring by quarter: 17–17, 4–10, 19–12, 17–21
Pts: Birmingham 15; Rebs: Birmingham 12; Asts: Birmingham 4		Pts: Slingerland 17; Rebs: Slingerland 13; Asts: Bergens 4

Sports Centre Boris Trajkovski
Attendance: 80
Referees: Orhan Cagri Hekimoglu (TUR), Sergiy Chaykovskyy (UKR), Andrej Zlatevski (MKD)

=== Group C ===
Pos	Team	Pld	W	L	PF	PA	PD	Pts	Qualification
1	Romania	5	5	0	452	314	+138	10	Quarterfinals
2	Slovakia	5	3	2	345	354	−9	8	Quarterfinals
3	Great Britain	5	2	3	337	335	+2	7	9th–16th place playoffs
4	Denmark	5	2	3	294	343	−49	7	9th–16th place playoffs
5	Ireland	5	2	3	338	356	−18	7	17th–22nd place classification
6	Norway	5	1	4	301	365	−64	6	17th–22nd place classification

Source: FIBA

8 August 2024
11:00

Boxscore

Great Britain	65–70	Ireland
Scoring by quarter: 17–15, 20–18, 14–22, 14–15
Pts: Fyfe 16; Rebs: Ahamefule 16; Asts: Ahamefule 5		Pts: Quinn 15; Rebs: Quinn 11; Asts: Ehigie 4

Sports Centre Boris Trajkovski
Attendance: 50
Referees: Mikheil Vartanov (GEO), Stefan Vukovic (MNE), Pantelis Vasiliou (CYP)

8 August 2024
11:00

Boxscore

Norway	55–90	Romania
Scoring by quarter: 12–19, 14–21, 7–22, 22–28
Pts: Falba 17; Rebs: Ronning 10; Asts: Ellingsen 4		Pts: Rasoga 15; Rebs: Ciulin 8 Asts: Rasoga 8

SRC Kale
Attendance: 100
Referees: Michal Kuzia (POL), Pierre Gilis (BEL), Tiago Roxo Perdigão (POR)

8 August 2024
21:00

Boxscore

Denmark	50–73	Slovakia
Scoring by quarter: 9–21, 12–33, 11–8, 18–11
Pts: Hjort 12; Rebs: Hjort 11; Asts: Aaboe 4		Pts: Kubala 16; Rebs: Randuska 12; Asts: Three players 2

SRC Kale
Attendance: 100
Referees: Polat Parlak (TUR), Bjarki Thor Davidsson (ISL), Vojkan Zivkovic (SRB)

9 August 2024
13:30

Boxscore

Ireland	72–59	Norway
Scoring by quarter: 20–17, 19–14, 14–13, 19–15
Pts: Bailey Morrow 18; Rebs: Bailey Morrow 8 Asts: Quinn, Patterson 5		Pts: Ellingsen 20; Rebs: Ronning 11; Asts: Ellingsen 2

Sports Centre Boris Trajkovski
Attendance: 100
Referees: Michal Kuzia (POL), Ioannis Tsibouris (GRE), Michail Papaioannou (SUI)

9 August 2024
18:30

Boxscore

Romania	102–70	Denmark
Scoring by quarter: 12–21, 38–15, 25–17, 27–17
Pts: Rasoga 18; Rebs: Banica 11; Asts: Rasoga 8		Pts: Hjort 20; Rebs: Aaboe 11; Asts: Skaaning 4

SRC Kale
Attendance: 50
Referees: Jan Baloun (CZE), Stefan Kuburovic (MNE), Danilo Petkovic (SRB)

9 August 2024
21:00

Boxscore

Slovakia	67–64	Great Britain
Scoring by quarter: 9–20, 16–19, 20–18, 22–7
Pts: Randuska 20; Rebs: Kubala 15; Asts: Randuska, Rybar 3		Pts: Ahamefule 18; Rebs: Davids 11; Asts: Fyfe 5

Sports Centre Boris Trajkovski
Attendance: 100
Referees: Gellert Kapitany (HUN), Ioannis Agrafiotis (GRE), Nika Štampalija (CRO)

10 August 2024
13:30

Boxscore

Ireland	70–93	Romania
Scoring by quarter: 21–23, 14–23, 20–29, 15–18
Pts: Bailey Morrow 19; Rebs: Bailey Morrow 11; Asts: Patterson 3		Pts: Rasoga 35; Rebs: Rasoga 8 Asts: Fometescu 5

Sports Centre Boris Trajkovski
Attendance: 100
Referees: Orhan Cagri Hekimoglu (TUR), Stefan Kuburovic (MNE), Nika Štampalija (CRO)

10 August 2024
16:00

Boxscore

Great Britain	66–60	Denmark
Scoring by quarter: 17–8, 9–9, 19–23, 21–20
Pts: Fyfe 17; Rebs: Davids 13; Asts: Fyfe 3		Pts: Ostoft 17; Rebs: Skaaning, Aaboe 7 Asts: Skaaning 4

SRC Kale
Attendance: 100
Referees: Ioannis Tsibouris (GRE), Tiago Roxo Perdigão (POR), Urfan Bayramli (AZE)

10 August 2024
21:00

Boxscore

Norway	75–63	Slovakia
Scoring by quarter: 21–13, 13–13, 18–20, 23–17
Pts: Ronning 15; Rebs: Ronning 10; Asts: Ellingsen 3		Pts: Randuska 15; Rebs: Lukjanec 9 Asts: Randuska 4

SRC Kale
Attendance: 70
Referees: Jan Baloun (CZE), Mikheil Vartanov (GEO), Pantelis Vasiliou (CYP)

12 August 2024
11:00

Boxscore

Slovakia	80–74	Ireland
Scoring by quarter: 14–21, 20–17, 25–18, 21–18
Pts: Randuska 26; Rebs: Kubala 8 Asts: Randuska 6		Pts: Bailey Morrow 32; Rebs: Bailey Morrow 13; Asts: Klimas 6

SRC Kale
Attendance: 100
Referees: Polat Parlak (TUR), Michal Kuzia (POL), Ioannis Tsibouris (GRE)

12 August 2024
11:00

Boxscore

Romania	76–57	Great Britain
Scoring by quarter: 17–13, 20–18, 27–19, 12–7
Pts: Rasoga 24; Rebs: Banica 6 Asts: Rasoga 6		Pts: Davids 12; Rebs: Ahamefule, Davids 12; Asts: Dutka 4

Sports Centre Boris Trajkovski
Attendance: 50
Referees: Ioannis Agrafiotis (GRE), Pierre Gilis (BEL), Vojkan Zivkovic (SRB)

12 August 2024
16:00

Boxscore

Denmark	55–50	Norway
Scoring by quarter: 14–10, 17–11, 7–9, 17–20
Pts: Aaboe 13; Rebs: Aaboe 12; Asts: Ostoft 5		Pts: Ellingsen 11; Rebs: Ronning 6 Asts: Ellingsen 3

Sports Centre Boris Trajkovski
Attendance: 50
Referees: Mikheil Vartanov (GEO), Bjarki Thor Davidsson (ISL), Pantelis Vasiliou (CYP)

13 August 2024
11:00

Boxscore

Ireland	52–59	Denmark
Scoring by quarter: 16–25, 9–10, 16–14, 11–10
Pts: Pahinag 13; Rebs: Quinn, Ehigie 10; Asts: Quinn 4		Pts: Skaaning 18; Rebs: Aaboe 15; Asts: Aaboe 7

SRC Kale
Attendance: 50
Referees: Pierre Gilis (BEL), Serafim Petrov (BUL), Pantelis Vasiliou (CYP)

13 August 2024
13:30

Boxscore

Slovakia	62–91	Romania
Scoring by quarter: 14–26, 17–20, 14–24, 17–21
Pts: Zlocha 15; Rebs: Janech 6 Asts: Janech 7		Pts: Fometescu 19; Rebs: Diaconescu 5 Asts: Rasoga 5

Sports Centre Boris Trajkovski
Attendance: 50
Referees: Jan Baloun (CZE), Ioannis Agrafiotis (GRE), Nika Štampalija (CRO)

13 August 2024
21:00

Boxscore

Norway	62–85	Great Britain
Scoring by quarter: 19–6, 9–25, 13–31, 21–23
Pts: Dyve 15; Rebs: Dyve 9 Asts: Dyve, Falba 4		Pts: Fyfe 29; Rebs: Ahamefule 7 Asts: Ahamefule 4

Sports Centre Boris Trajkovski
Attendance: 50
Referees: Polat Parlak (TUR), Stefan Kuburovic (MNE), Urfan Bayramli (AZE)

=== Group D ===
Pos	Team	Pld	W	L	PF	PA	PD	Pts	Qualification
1	Estonia	4	3	1	309	255	+54	7	Quarterfinals
2	Sweden	4	3	1	324	287	+37	7	Quarterfinals
3	North Macedonia	4	3	1	323	306	+17	7	9th–16th place playoffs
4	Austria	4	1	3	314	340	−26	5	9th–16th place playoffs
5	Ukraine	4	0	4	264	346	−82	4	17th–22nd place classification

Source: FIBA

8 August 2024
18:30

Boxscore

Ukraine	68–96	North Macedonia
Scoring by quarter: 14–28, 14–21, 14–24, 26–23
Pts: Bilous 20; Rebs: Tatunchak 12; Asts: Six players 2		Pts: Cvetkovski 22; Rebs: Danev 11; Asts: Gjorgjevikj 8

SRC Kale
Attendance: 600
Referees: Jan Baloun (CZE), Ioannis Tsibouris (GRE), Nika Štampalija (CRO)

8 August 2024
18:30

Boxscore

Austria	73–100	Sweden
Scoring by quarter: 17–27, 21–27, 12–26, 23–20
Pts: Manukian 13; Rebs: Kapic 10; Asts: Kapic, Witzmann 3		Pts: Price 19; Rebs: Bunner 12; Asts: Price 8

Sports Centre Boris Trajkovski
Attendance: 50
Referees: Gellert Kapitany (HUN), Stefan Kuburovic (MNE), Michail Papaioannou (SUI)

9 August 2024
16:00

Boxscore

Estonia	78–53	Austria
Scoring by quarter: 22–23, 15–9, 22–6, 19–15
Pts: Roman 13; Rebs: Avdejev 13; Asts: Põder, Vuks 4		Pts: Benczak 11; Rebs: Three players 4 Asts: Mendl 4

SRC Kale
Attendance: 50
Referees: Mikheil Vartanov (GEO), Bjarki Thor Davidsson (ISL), Tiago Roxo Perdigão (POR)

9 August 2024
18:30

Boxscore

Sweden	72–62	Ukraine
Scoring by quarter: 16–12, 27–15, 9–18, 20–17
Pts: Price 22; Rebs: Three players 6 Asts: Price 3		Pts: Bilous 17; Rebs: Tatunchak 12; Asts: Stadnyk, Besheita 3

Sports Centre Boris Trajkovski
Attendance: 100
Referees: Polat Parlak (TUR), Pierre Gilis (BEL), Pantelis Vasiliou (CYP)

10 August 2024
13:30

Boxscore

Ukraine	67–78	Estonia
Scoring by quarter: 15–21, 15–20, 15–22, 22–15
Pts: Bilous 22; Rebs: Bilous 9 Asts: Bilous 4		Pts: Avdejev 22; Rebs: Avdejev 12; Asts: Vuks 5

SRC Kale
Attendance: 100
Referees: Polat Parlak (TUR), Stefan Vukovic (MNE), Serafim Petrov (BUL)

10 August 2024
18:30

Boxscore

North Macedonia	75–74 (OT)	Sweden
Scoring by quarter: 13–17, 27–19, 21–18, 6–13, Overtime: 8–7
Pts: Cvetkovski 20; Rebs: Neshovikj 8 Asts: Gjorgjevikj 6		Pts: Mollermark 22; Rebs: Novakovic 10; Asts: Mollermark 2

SRC Kale
Attendance: 200
Referees: Gellert Kapitany (HUN), Michail Papaioannou (SUI), Vojkan Zivkovic (SRB)

12 August 2024
18:30

Boxscore

Estonia	76–57	North Macedonia
Scoring by quarter: 23–21, 18–10, 22–14, 13–12
Pts: Adamson 23; Rebs: Põder, Avdejev 10; Asts: Vuks 5		Pts: Cvetkovski 11; Rebs: Neshovikj, Stojanovski 6 Asts: Cvetkovski 3

SRC Kale
Attendance: 700
Referees: Jan Baloun (CZE), Michail Papaioannou (SUI), Stefan Vukovic (MNE)

12 August 2024
21:00

Boxscore

Austria	100–67	Ukraine
Scoring by quarter: 22–5, 19–13, 32–20, 27–29
Pts: Witzmann 18; Rebs: Kapic 12; Asts: Chavez 8		Pts: Stadnyk 17; Rebs: Tatunchak 8 Asts: Stadnyk 5

SRC Kale
Attendance: 50
Referees: Gellert Kapitany (HUN), Tiago Roxo Perdigão (POR), Urfan Bayramli (AZE)

13 August 2024
16:00

Boxscore

Sweden	78–77	Estonia
Scoring by quarter: 12–17, 25–20, 21–18, 20–22
Pts: Price 24; Rebs: Karlsson Rask 8 Asts: Le Cesne 4		Pts: Avdejev 20; Rebs: Pertel 12; Asts: Roman 4

Sports Centre Boris Trajkovski
Attendance: 80
Referees: Michail Papaioannou (SUI), Tiago Roxo Perdigão (POR), Vojkan Zivkovic (SRB)

13 August 2024
18:30

Boxscore

North Macedonia	95–88	Austria
Scoring by quarter: 21–23, 26–21, 26–18, 22–26
Pts: Cvetkovski 25; Rebs: Terzievski 8 Asts: Gjorgjevikj 7		Pts: Witzmann 26; Rebs: Witzmann 8 Asts: Kapic 5

SRC Kale
Attendance: 500
Referees: Ioannis Tsibouris (GRE), Bjarki Thor Davidsson (ISL), Stefan Vukovic (MNE)

== 17th–22nd place classification ==
=== Group E ===
Pos	Team	Pld	W	L	PF	PA	PD	Pts	Qualification
1	Bosnia and Herzegovina	2	2	0	177	145	+32	4	17th place match
2	Cyprus	2	1	1	125	131	−6	3	19th place match
3	Luxembourg	2	0	2	121	147	−26	2	21st place match

Source: FIBA

15 August 2024
11:00

Boxscore

Luxembourg	81–86	Bosnia and Herzegovina
Scoring by quarter: 19–26, 22–15, 16–24, 24–21
Pts: Jungers 19; Rebs: Daleiden, Brosius 7 Asts: Jungers 7		Pts: Preldzic 19; Rebs: Preldzic 11; Asts: Bozic 9

SRC Kale
Attendance: 50
Referees: Stefan Vukovic (MNE), Serafim Petrov (BUL), Urfan Bayramli (AZE)

16 August 2024
11:00

Boxscore

Bosnia and Herzegovina	91–64	Cyprus
Scoring by quarter: 20–18, 21–17, 31–14, 19–15
Pts: Bozic 17; Rebs: Frljuckic 11; Asts: Bozic, Preldzic 4		Pts: Mastoris, Georgiou 13; Rebs: Oikonomou 5 Asts: Nicolaou, Mastoris 3

Sports Centre Boris Trajkovski
Attendance: 50
Referees: Zdenko Zubak (SVK), Bjarki Thor Davidsson (ISL), Pierre Gilis (BEL)

=== Group F ===
Pos	Team	Pld	W	L	PF	PA	PD	Pts	Qualification
1	Ireland	2	1	1	137	128	+9	3	17th place match
2	Norway	2	1	1	146	138	+8	3	19th place match
3	Ukraine	2	1	1	135	152	−17	3	21st place match

Source: FIBA

15 August 2024
11:00

Boxscore

Norway	87–66	Ukraine
Scoring by quarter: 25–18, 16–6, 17–21, 29–21
Pts: Falba 17; Rebs: Ronning 15; Asts: Kristiansen, Falba 4		Pts: Stadnyk 16; Rebs: Tatunchak 9 Asts: Stadnyk 4

Sports Centre Boris Trajkovski
Attendance: 100
Referees: Michail Papaioannou (SUI), Vojkan Zivkovic (SRB), Bjarki Thor Davidsson (ISL)

16 August 2024
11:00

Boxscore

Ukraine	69–65	Ireland
Scoring by quarter: 14–25, 22–18, 23–7, 10–15
Pts: Bilous 19; Rebs: Bilous, Tatunchak 9 Asts: Stadnyk, Babych 3		Pts: Quinn 18; Rebs: Elmahi, Gbinigie 8 Asts: Klimas 4

SRC Kale
Attendance: 100
Referees: Gellert Kapitany (HUN), Stefan Kuburovic (MNE), Ngadhnjim Shabani (KOS)

=== 21st place match ===
17 August 2024
16:30

Boxscore

Luxembourg	82–91 (OT)	Ukraine
Scoring by quarter: 16–20, 9–18, 23–16, 24–18, Overtime: 10–19
Pts: Jungers 29; Rebs: Jungers 17; Asts: Jungers 6		Pts: Bilous 32; Rebs: Kochera 9 Asts: Stadnyk 8

Sports Centre Boris Trajkovski
Attendance: 50
Referees: Gellert Kapitany (HUN), Vojkan Zivkovic (SRB), Aleksandar Radonjic (AUT)

=== 19th place match ===
17 August 2024
09:00

Boxscore

Cyprus	58–59	Norway
Scoring by quarter: 14–13, 13–15, 14–15, 17–16
Pts: Constantinou 15; Rebs: Solomou 8 Asts: Solomou, Zinonos 3		Pts: Falba 12; Rebs: Ronning 16; Asts: Falba 4

SRC Kale
Attendance: 50
Referees: Michal Kuzia (POL), Pierre Gilis (BEL), Dumitru Stasiev (MDA)

=== 17th place match ===
17 August 2024
09:00

Boxscore

Bosnia and Herzegovina	67–78	Ireland
Scoring by quarter: 23–15, 17–21, 15–21, 12–21
Pts: Preldzic 23; Rebs: Preldzic 14; Asts: Sipkovic 6		Pts: Bailey Morrow 14; Rebs: Elmahi 9 Asts: Klimas 7

Sports Centre Boris Trajkovski
Attendance: 30
Referees: Alin Faur (ROU), Serafim Petrov (BUL), Pantelis Vasiliou (CYP)

== 9th–16th place playoffs ==
13th place match
Iceland	76
Austria	65
15th place match
Denmark	51
Czech Republic	87

13th–16th place semifinals
Iceland	69
Denmark	56
Czech Republic	65
Austria	77

9th–16th place quarterfinals
A3	Portugal	80
B4	Iceland	65
D3	North Macedonia	70
C4	Denmark	67
B3	Czech Republic	57
A4	Hungary	79
C3	Great Britain	78
D4	Austria	56

9th–12th place semifinals
Portugal	68
North Macedonia	70
Hungary	69
Great Britain	51

9th place match
North Macedonia	71
Hungary	80
11th place match
Portugal	76
Great Britain	63

=== 9th–16th place quarterfinals ===
15 August 2024
13:30

Boxscore

Czech Republic	57–79	Hungary
Scoring by quarter: 18–19, 15–24, 12–23, 12–13
Pts: Zalud, Krob 11; Rebs: Broda, Davidek 7 Asts: Zalud, Broda 4		Pts: Bartik 27; Rebs: Halasy 13; Asts: Zoldi 9

SRC Kale
Attendance: 50
Referees: Ioannis Tsibouris (GRE), Stefan Kuburovic (MNE), Dumitru Stasiev (MDA)

15 August 2024
16:00

Boxscore

Great Britain	78–56	Austria
Scoring by quarter: 20–9, 19–16, 16–11, 23–20
Pts: Davids 15; Rebs: Banjoko 13; Asts: Dutka, Ahamefule 3		Pts: Manukian 13; Rebs: Kapic 12; Asts: Mendl 4

SRC Kale
Attendance: 80
Referees: Marek Kukelcik (SVK), Sergiy Chaykovskyy (UKR), Pantelis Vasiliou (CYP)

15 August 2024
18:30

Boxscore

North Macedonia	70–67	Denmark
Scoring by quarter: 8–15, 21–12, 23–13, 18–27
Pts: Cvetkovski 15; Rebs: Danev 8 Asts: Gjorgjevikj 6		Pts: Skaaning 16; Rebs: Aaboe 14; Asts: Skaaning 6

SRC Kale
Attendance: 350
Referees: Alin Faur (ROU), Michal Kuzia (POL), Pierre Gilis (BEL)

15 August 2024
21:00

Boxscore

Portugal	80–65	Iceland
Scoring by quarter: 20–20, 23–16, 18–15, 19–14
Pts: Cordeniz 17; Rebs: Moreira 12; Asts: Greno 6		Pts: Oskarsson 19; Rebs: Leifsson 9 Asts: Leifsson 3

SRC Kale
Attendance: 50
Referees: Rainis Värv (EST), Zdenko Zubak (SVK), Nika Štampalija (CRO)

=== 13th–16th place semifinals ===
16 August 2024
13:30

Boxscore

Czech Republic	65–77	Austria
Scoring by quarter: 33–19, 12–32, 8–9, 12–17
Pts: Nosek 14; Rebs: Sadovsky 12; Asts: Sadovsky 4		Pts: Witzmann 20; Rebs: Kapic 10; Asts: Bajramovic, Chavez 4

SRC Kale
Attendance: 100
Referees: Pierre Landy (FRA), Serafim Petrov (BUL), Filip Oliver Szczesny (NOR)

16 August 2024
16:00

Boxscore

Iceland	69–56	Denmark
Scoring by quarter: 14–14, 18–14, 23–17, 14–11
Pts: Birmingham 16; Rebs: Three players 4 Asts: Five players 2		Pts: Skaaning 21; Rebs: Aaboe 11; Asts: Skaaning 6

SRC Kale
Attendance: 50
Referees: Michail Papaioannou (SUI), Vojkan Zivkovic (SRB), Pantelis Vasiliou (CYP)

=== 15th place match ===
17 August 2024
11:30

Boxscore

Denmark	51–87	Czech Republic
Scoring by quarter: 12–19, 12–16, 17–26, 10–26
Pts: Skaaning 11; Rebs: Aaboe 9 Asts: Skaaning 3		Pts: Brezik 15; Rebs: Buben 8 Asts: Brezik 6

SRC Kale
Attendance: 60
Referees: Zdenko Zubak (SVK), Stefan Vukovic (MNE), Bjarki Thor Davidsson (ISL)

=== 13th place match ===
17 August 2024
11:30

Boxscore

Iceland	76–65	Austria
Scoring by quarter: 27–8, 12–18, 17–15, 20–24
Pts: Oddgeirsson, Steinsen 14; Rebs: Birmingham 8 Asts: Steinsen, Leifsson 6		Pts: Kapic 17; Rebs: Kapic 7 Asts: Kapic 5

Sports Centre Boris Trajkovski
Attendance: 50
Referees: Pierre Landy (FRA), Stefan Kuburovic (MNE), Urfan Bayramli (AZE)

=== 9th–12th place semifinals ===
16 August 2024
18:30

Boxscore

Portugal	68–70	North Macedonia
Scoring by quarter: 14–21, 16–24, 20–13, 18–12
Pts: Teixeira 14; Rebs: Teixeira 13; Asts: Greno 7		Pts: Gjorgjevikj 22; Rebs: Neshovikj 12; Asts: Gjorgjevikj 5

SRC Kale
Attendance: 200
Referees: Orhan Cagri Hekimoglu (TUR), Sergiy Chaykovskyy (UKR), Frane Mjeda (CRO)

16 August 2024
21:00

Boxscore

Hungary	69–51	Great Britain
Scoring by quarter: 15–7, 19–14, 22–17, 13–13
Pts: Kurfis 20; Rebs: Asztalos 19; Asts: Puskas 7		Pts: Three players 10; Rebs: Davids 10; Asts: Curran 4

SRC Kale
Attendance: 100
Referees: Danilo Petkovic (SRB), Stefan Vukovic (MNE), Urfan Bayramli (AZE)

=== 11th place match ===
17 August 2024
16:30

Boxscore

Portugal	76–63	Great Britain
Scoring by quarter: 15–16, 11–20, 20–13, 30–14
Pts: Conceicao 22; Rebs: Teixeira 11; Asts: Prado, Conceicao 3		Pts: Fyfe 26; Rebs: Mcallister 6 Asts: Dutka, Nwokolo 2

SRC Kale
Attendance: 50
Referees: Danilo Petkovic (SRB), Filip Oliver Szczesny (NOR), Michail Papaioannou (SUI)

=== 9th place match ===
17 August 2024
19:00

Boxscore

North Macedonia	71–80	Hungary
Scoring by quarter: 16–23, 17–18, 25–25, 13–14
Pts: Cvetkovski 24; Rebs: Eftimovski 8 Asts: Gjorgjevikj 4		Pts: Kurfis 30; Rebs: Asztalos 13; Asts: Puskas 4

SRC Kale
Attendance: 250
Referees: Orhan Cagri Hekimoglu (TUR), Michal Kuzia (POL), Ioannis Tsibouris (GRE)

== Championship playoffs ==
5th place match
Slovakia	57
Montenegro	77
7th place match
Netherlands	73
Sweden	58

5th–8th place semifinals
Netherlands	55
Slovakia	75
Montenegro	81
Sweden	66

Quarterfinals
A1	Belgium	87
B2	Netherlands	65
D1	Estonia	73
C2	Slovakia	48
B1	Montenegro	72
A2	Switzerland	79
C1	Romania	96
D2	Sweden	73

Semifinals
Belgium	46
Estonia	67
Switzerland	65
Romania	72

Final
Estonia	76
Romania	71
3rd place match
Belgium	75
Switzerland	80

=== Quarterfinals ===
15 August 2024
13:30

Boxscore

Belgium	87–65	Netherlands
Scoring by quarter: 16–19, 22–21, 27–10, 22–15
Pts: Ona Embo 24; Rebs: Waerniers 7 Asts: Ona Embo 8		Pts: Anike 30; Rebs: Slingerland, Besana 7 Asts: Anike 3

Sports Centre Boris Trajkovski
Attendance: 150
Referees: Orhan Cagri Hekimoglu (TUR), Tiago Roxo Perdigão (POR), Aleksandar Radonjic (AUT)

15 August 2024
16:00

Boxscore

Estonia	73–48	Slovakia
Scoring by quarter: 20–10, 19–11, 21–14, 13–13
Pts: Three players 13; Rebs: Avdejev 7 Asts: Pärn 5		Pts: Rybar 19; Rebs: Kubala, Mrva 8 Asts: Randuska, Rybar 2

Sports Centre Boris Trajkovski
Attendance: 50
Referees: Pierre Landy (FRA), Gellert Kapitany (HUN), Danilo Petkovic (SRB)

15 August 2024
18:30

Boxscore

Montenegro	72–79	Switzerland
Scoring by quarter: 25–21, 11–14, 22–23, 14–21
Pts: Stankovic 18; Rebs: Stankovic, Djukanovic 12; Asts: Vekovic 5		Pts: Rebetez 22; Rebs: Rebetez, Zumstein 12; Asts: Rebetez 9

Sports Centre Boris Trajkovski
Attendance: 100
Referees: Polat Parlak (TUR), Skirmantas Letukas (DEN), Ioannis Agrafiotis (GRE)

15 August 2024
21:00

Boxscore

Romania	96–73	Sweden
Scoring by quarter: 32–25, 20–15, 22–9, 22–24
Pts: Fometescu 27; Rebs: Rasoga 14; Asts: Cepoi 5		Pts: Price 20; Rebs: Mollermark, Tomic 6 Asts: Four players 3

Sports Centre Boris Trajkovski
Attendance: 80
Referees: Jan Baloun (CZE), Mikheil Vartanov (GEO), Frane Mjeda (CRO)

=== 5th–8th place semifinals ===
16 August 2024
13:30

Boxscore

Netherlands	55–75	Slovakia
Scoring by quarter: 13–22, 13–15, 13–19, 16–19
Pts: Leeuwin 13; Rebs: Reinten 4 Asts: Three players 2		Pts: Randuska 23; Rebs: Valocsay 11; Asts: Rybar 5

Sports Centre Boris Trajkovski
Attendance: 50
Referees: Tiago Roxo Perdigão (POR), Rainis Värv (EST), Aleksandar Radonjic (AUT)

16 August 2024
16:00

Boxscore

Montenegro	81–66	Sweden
Scoring by quarter: 22–13, 23–11, 19–20, 17–22
Pts: Ivelja, Stankovic 13; Rebs: Djukanovic 12; Asts: Ivelja 4		Pts: Mollermark 13; Rebs: Holm Keita 10; Asts: Forlini 4

Sports Centre Boris Trajkovski
Attendance: 100
Referees: Alin Faur (ROU), Ioannis Tsibouris (GRE), Michal Kuzia (POL)

=== 7th place match ===
17 August 2024
14:00

Boxscore

Netherlands	73–58	Sweden
Scoring by quarter: 16–14, 15–12, 19–17, 23–15
Pts: van der Heijden 14; Rebs: van der Heijden 10; Asts: Anike 7		Pts: Price 14; Rebs: Three players 4 Asts: Le Cesne 5

SRC Kale
Attendance: 50
Referees: Sergiy Chaykovskyy (UKR), Ioannis Agrafiotis (GRE), Nika Štampalija (CRO)

=== 5th place match ===
17 August 2024
14:00

Boxscore

Slovakia	57–77	Montenegro
Scoring by quarter: 10–18, 11–19, 23–21, 13–19
Pts: Randuska 17; Rebs: Kubala 12; Asts: Rybar 3		Pts: Stankovic 21; Rebs: Djukanovic 13; Asts: Vekovic, Stankovic 3

Sports Centre Boris Trajkovski
Attendance: 20
Referees: Tiago Roxo Perdigão (POR), Ngadhnjim Shabani (KOS), Frane Mjeda (CRO)

=== Semifinals ===
16 August 2024
18:30

Boxscore

Belgium	46–67	Estonia
Scoring by quarter: 7–13, 20–15, 5–22, 14–17
Pts: Modestine 9 Rebs: Coudyser 5 Asts: Van Hecke, Waerniers 2		Pts: Adamson 17; Rebs: Põder, Avdejev 10; Asts: Vuks 4

Sports Centre Boris Trajkovski
Attendance: 100
Referees: Jan Baloun (CZE), Mikheil Vartanov (GEO), Skirmantas Letukas (DEN)

16 August 2024
21:00

Boxscore

Switzerland	65–72	Romania
Scoring by quarter: 15–25, 21–21, 17–11, 12–15
Pts: Rebetez 18; Rebs: Rebetez 14; Asts: Rebetez 5		Pts: Rasoga 25; Rebs: Banica 11; Asts: Rasoga 8

Sports Centre Boris Trajkovski
Attendance: 50
Referees: Marek Kukelcik (SVK), Polat Parlak (TUR), Ioannis Agrafiotis (GRE)

=== 3rd place match ===
17 August 2024
19:00

Boxscore

Belgium	75–80	Switzerland
Scoring by quarter: 21–20, 12–23, 23–19, 19–18
Pts: Ona Embo 35; Rebs: Van Hecke 7 Asts: Ona Embo 7		Pts: Cokara 21; Rebs: Cokara 8 Asts: Cokara 6

Sports Centre Boris Trajkovski
Attendance: 50
Referees: Jan Baloun (CZE), Marek Kukelcik (SVK), Rainis Värv (EST)

=== Final ===
17 August 2024
21:30

Boxscore

Estonia	76–71	Romania
Scoring by quarter: 20–15, 20–15, 21–16, 15–25
Pts: Pertel, Adamson 15; Rebs: Avdejev 12; Asts: Vuks 6		Pts: Rasoga 20; Rebs: Banica 8 Asts: Rasoga 4

Sports Centre Boris Trajkovski
Attendance: 1,000
Referees: Mikheil Vartanov (GEO), Polat Parlak (TUR), Skirmantas Letukas (DEN)

== Final standings ==
Rank	Team	Record
1st place, gold medalist(s)	Estonia	6–1
2nd place, silver medalist(s)	Romania	7–1
3rd place, bronze medalist(s)	Switzerland	5–2
4	Belgium	5–2
5	Montenegro	6–2
6	Slovakia	4–4
7	Netherlands	4–4
8	Sweden	3–4
9	Hungary	4–3
10	North Macedonia	5–2
11	Portugal	3–4
12	Great Britain	3–5
13	Iceland	3–5
14	Austria	2–5
15	Czech Republic	5–3
16	Denmark	2–6
17	Ireland	3–4
18	Bosnia and Herzegovina	3–4
19	Norway	3–4
20	Cyprus	1–6
21	Ukraine	2–5
22	Luxembourg	1–6

Promoted to the 2025 FIBA U16 EuroBasket Division A
Relegated to the 2025 FIBA U16 EuroBasket Division C

== Statistics and awards ==
=== Statistical leaders ===
==== Players ====
Points

Name	PPG
(Romania) David-Ioan Rasoga	20.9
(Ukraine) Petro Bilous	19.8
(Belgium) Aaron Ona Embo	18.9
(Switzerland) Elyjah Rebetez	18.6
(Hungary) Zeteny Kurfis	17.3

Rebounds

Name	RPG
(Montenegro) Djordje Djukanovic	14.0
(Hungary) Miklos Asztalos	13.0
(Denmark) Laurits Bomholt Aaboe	10.6
(Estonia) Roman Avdejev	10.4
(Norway) Christoffer Ronning	10.3

Assists

Name	APG
(Romania) David-Ioan Rasoga	5.6
(North Macedonia) Grigorij Gjorgjevikj	5.4
(Iceland) Jakob Leifsson	5.0
(Portugal) Santiago Greno	4.7
(Belgium) Aaron Ona Embo	4.7

Blocks

Name	BPG
(Estonia) Roman Avdejev	2.1
(Netherlands) Teun van der Heijden	2.0
(Iceland) Patrik Birmingham	2.0
(Switzerland) Elvis Anyamele	2.0
(Switzerland) Brayden Zumstein	1.9

Steals

Name	SPG
(North Macedonia) Zharko Terzievski	3.1
(Austria) Armin Kapic	3.1
(Romania) David Fometescu	3.0
(North Macedonia) Grigorij Gjorgjevikj	2.9
(Switzerland) Alex Serreau	2.6

Efficiency

Name	EFFPG
(Hungary) Miklos Asztalos	23.7
(Switzerland) Elyjah Rebetez	22.3
(Montenegro) Djordje Djukanovic	21.5
(Romania) David-Ioan Rasoga	21.3
(Estonia) Roman Avdejev	19.9

==== Teams ====
Points

Team	PPG
Romania	86.4
Montenegro	80.0
North Macedonia	76.3
Bosnia and Herzegovina	76.1
Switzerland	75.1

Rebounds

Team	RPG
Estonia	51.4
Great Britain	48.5
Montenegro	48.5
Netherlands	46.8
Hungary	46.7
Portugal	46.7

Assists

Team	APG
Bosnia and Herzegovina	18.4
Romania	17.8
Montenegro	17.5
Ireland	17.3
Belgium	16.9

Blocks

Team	BPG
Netherlands	7.0
Estonia	6.1
Czech Republic	5.3
Switzerland	5.3
Great Britain	4.6

Steals

Team	SPG
Romania	17.1
Austria	15.3
North Macedonia	13.1
Switzerland	12.7
Luxembourg	12.3

Efficiency

Team	EFFPG
Romania	98.0
Montenegro	89.9
Estonia	87.6
Switzerland	85.0
Belgium	78.7

=== Awards ===
The awards were announced on 17 August 2024.

Award	Player
All-Tournament Team	(Estonia) Roman Avdejev
All-Tournament Team	(Montenegro) Djordje Djukanovi
All-Tournament Team	(Belgium) Aaron Ona Embo
All-Tournament Team	(Switzerland) Elyjah Rebetez
All-Tournament Team	(Romania) David-Ioan Rasoga
Most Valuable Player	(Estonia) Roman Avdejev
