= Iceland men's national under-16 basketball team =

Iceland
- FIBA zone: FIBA Europe
- National federation: KKÍ

U17 World Cup
- Appearances: None

U16 EuroBasket
- Appearances: 4
- Medals: None

U16 EuroBasket Division B
- Appearances: 12
- Medals: Silver: 2 (2004, 2026)
Home	Away

The Iceland men's national under-16 basketball team is a national basketball team of Iceland, administered by the Icelandic Basketball Association. It represents the country in international under-16 men's basketball competitions.

== FIBA U16 EuroBasket participations ==
Year	Division A	Division B
1975	16th	
1993	9th	
2004		2nd place, silver medalist(s)
2005	14th	
2006	16th	
2008		13th
2015		18th
2016		21st

Year	Division A	Division B
2017		13th
2018		6th
2019		15th
2022		5th
2023		15th
2024		13th
2025		10th
2026		2nd place, silver medalist(s)

== See also ==
- Iceland men's national basketball team
- Iceland men's national under-18 basketball team
- Iceland women's national under-16 basketball team
