= Ireland men's national under-16 basketball team =

Ireland
- FIBA zone: FIBA Europe
- National federation: Basketball Ireland

U17 World Cup
- Appearances: None

U16 EuroBasket
- Appearances: None

U16 EuroBasket Division B
- Appearances: 20
- Medals: None

The Ireland men's national under-16 basketball team is a national basketball team of Island of Ireland, administered by Basketball Ireland. It represents the country in international under-16 men's basketball competitions.

== FIBA U16 EuroBasket participations ==
Year	Result in Division B
2004	19th
2005	14th
2006	16th
2007	16th
2008	22nd
2009	14th
2010	15th
2011	20th
2013	18th
2014	21st

Year	Result in Division B
2015	19th
2016	20th
2017	11th
2018	15th
2019	16th
2022	21st
2023	21st
2024	17th
2025	12th
2026	11th

== See also ==
- Ireland men's national basketball team
- Ireland men's national under-18 basketball team
- Ireland women's national under-16 basketball team
