= Switzerland men's national under-16 basketball team =

Switzerland
- FIBA zone: FIBA Europe
- National federation: Swiss Basketball

U17 World Cup
- Appearances: None

U16 EuroBasket
- Appearances: 3
- Medals: None

U16 EuroBasket Division B
- Appearances: 15
- Medals: Bronze: 1 (2024)
Home	Away

The Switzerland men's national under-16 basketball team is a national basketball team of Switzerland, administered by the Swiss Basketball. It represents the country in international under-16 men's basketball competitions.

The team competes at the FIBA U16 EuroBasket, mostly in Division B.

Toni Rocak who later played in the US-based NCAA and also became a member of Switzerland's senior team is a notable former member.

== FIBA U16 EuroBasket participations ==
Year	Division A	Division B
1971	12th	
1991	12th	
2008		12th
2009		18th
2010		7th
2011		13th
2012		16th
2013		11th
2014		16th

Year	Division A	Division B
2015		15th
2017		17th
2018		18th
2019		22nd
2022		11th
2023		19th
2024		3rd place, bronze medalist(s)
2025	16th	
2026		21st

== See also ==
- Switzerland men's national basketball team
- Switzerland men's national under-18 basketball team
- Switzerland women's national under-16 basketball team
