= Great Britain men's national under-16 basketball team =

Great Britain
- FIBA zone: FIBA Europe
- National federation: British Basketball

Under-17 World Cup
- Appearances: None

U16 EuroBasket
- Appearances: None

U16 EuroBasket Division B
- Appearances: 8
- Medals: None
Home	Away

The Great Britain men's national under-16 basketball team is a national basketball team of Great Britain, administered by British Basketball. It represents the country in international under-16 men's basketball competitions.

== FIBA U16 EuroBasket participations ==
Year	Result in Division B
2017	4th
2018	7th
2019	10th
2022	10th
2023	10th
2024	12th
2025	15th
2026	7th

== See also ==
- Great Britain men's national basketball team
- Great Britain men's national under-18 basketball team
- Great Britain women's national under-16 basketball team
