= 2003–04 Lega Basket Serie A =

Lega Basket Serie A
- Season: 2003–04
- Duration: October 4, 2003 – June 5, 2004
- Games played: 34
- Teams: 18

Regular season
- Top seed: Montepaschi Siena
- Season MVP: (Italy) Gianluca Basile
- Relegated: Coop Nordest Trieste; Sicilia Messina

Finals
- Champions: Montepaschi Siena; 1st title
- Runners-up: Skipper Bologna
- Semifinalists: Benetton Treviso; Scavolini Pesaro
- Finals MVP: (Australia) David Andersen

Statistical leaders
Points	(United States) Charlie Bell	25.5
Rebounds	(United States) K'zell Wesson	9.5
Assists	(Italy) Leonardo Busca	4.9

The 2003–04 Lega Basket Serie A, known as the Serie A TIM for sponsorship reasons, was the 82nd season of the Lega Basket Serie A, the highest professional basketball league in Italy.

The regular season ran from October 4, 2003 to May 9, 2004, 18 teams played 34 games each. The top 8 teams made the play-offs whilst the two lowest ranked teams, Coop Nordest Trieste and Sicilia Messina, were relegated to the Legadue.

Montepaschi Siena won their first ever title by winning the playoff finals series against Skipper Bologna.

== Teams ==
Lega Basket 2003–04 – Club Locations

Team	City	Arena	Capacity
Air Avellino	Avellino	Palasport Del Mauro	5,195
Benetton Treviso	Treviso	PalaVerde	5,344
Breil Milano	Milan	Mediolanum Forum	12,331
Coop Nordest Trieste	Trieste	PalaTrieste	6,943
Euro Roseto	Roseto degli Abruzzi	PalaMaggetti	4,000
Lauretana Biella	Biella	Lauretana Biella Forum	5,007
Lottomatica Roma	Rome	Palazzetto dello Sport	3,500
Mabo Livorno	Livorno	PalaLivorno Algida	8,033
Metis Varese	Varese	PalaWhirlpool	5,100
Montepaschi Siena	Siena	PalaEstra	5,070
Oregon Scientific Cantù	Cantù	Mapooro Arena	3,910
Pompea Napoli	Naples	PalaBarbuto	5,000
Scavolini Pesaro	Pesaro	Adriatic Arena	6,119
Sicilia Messina	Messina	PalaSanFilippo	5,500
Skipper Bologna	Bologna	PalaDozza	5,700
Snaidero Cucine Udine	Udine	PalaCarnera	3,850
Teramo Basket	Teramo	PalaScapriano	3,559
Tris Reggio Calabria	Reggio Calabria	PalaCalafiore	7,000

== Season narrative ==
=== Preseason ===
The league signed a three-year sponsorship contract with mobile phone company TIM in September 2003, award the naming rights for the competition.

Prior to the start of play, in August 2003, Virtus Bologna were excluded from the league due to financial irregularities (namely unpaid wages), they were replaced by Sicilia Messina, the losing finalist of the preceding year's Legadue, a proposal to expand the league to 20 clubs and thus include both clubs was not approved.

Reigning champions Benetton Treviso were seen as the favourites to retain their title, teams Lottomatica Roma, Scavolini Pesaro, Montepaschi Siena and Skipper Bologna were seen as the main challengers, with Air Avellino, Coop Nordest Trieste, Mabo Livorno and above all Sicilia Messina seen as the clubs fighting to avoid relegation.

=== Regular season ===
Montepaschi Sienna finished first in the league for the first time of their history, Skipper Bologna and Benetton Treviso finished equal on points in second place but Skipper was 2-0 in their direct confrontations and hence superseded Treviso. The title was strongly expected to be disputed between these three teams.

At the other end of the standings, late promotee Sicilia Messina predictably struggled on the court - a relegation confirmed in the penultimate round seen as an achievement - and off the court, with financial problems and a perceived disinterest by the public. The other relegated team Coop Nordest Trieste also struggled financially (along with some other Serie A teams), both would declare bankruptcy in the course of the following year.

=== Playoffs ===
After reaching the finals for a historic first time, Montepaschi Sienna won its first championship after winning all of its playoff games. Losing finalist Skipper Bologna's prior defeat of Benetton Treviso meant that Benetton, who had won the last two editions, did not compete in the final for only the second time in six years.

== Regular season ==
Pos	Teams	P	W	L	PF	PA	Qualification or relegation
1	Montepaschi Siena	34	26	8	3014	2746	Playoffs
2 (Note: Ranking by head-to-head record in case of tie.)	Skipper Bologna	34	25	9	2941	2730	Playoffs
3	Benetton Treviso	34	25	9	2943	2640	Playoffs
4	Scavolini Pesaro	34	23	11	2918	2761	Playoffs
5	Pompea Napoli	34	22	12	2858	2808	Playoffs
6	Oregon Scientific Cantù	34	20	14	2835	2816	Playoffs
7	Lottomatica Roma	34	19	15	2712	2653	Playoffs
8	Metis Varese	34	18	16	2906	2905	Playoffs
9	Tris Reggio Calabria	34	16	18	2733	2734	
10	Breil Milano	34	15	19	2744	2737	
11	Lauretana Biella	34	15	19	2756	2759	
12	Snaidero Cucine Udine	34	15	19	2850	2881	
13	Euro Roseto	34	14	20	2841	2944	
14	Teramo Basket	34	11	23	2765	2984	
15	Mabo Livorno	34	11	23	2360	2623	
16	Air Avellino	34	11	23	2834	2919	
17	Coop Nordest Trieste	34	10	24	2518	2842	Relegation to Legadue
18	Sicilia Messina	34	8	26	2768	3024	Relegation to Legadue

== Individual statistics, regular season ==
=== Points ===
Rank	Name	Team	PPG
1.	(United States) Charlie Bell	Mabo Livorno	25.5
2.	(Italy) Mario Boni	Teramo Basket	23.8
3.	(United States) Alphonso Ford	Scavolini Pesaro	23.5
4.	(United States) Mike Penberthy	Pompea Napoli	21.3
5.	(Italy) Carlton Myers	Lottomatica Roma	20.2

=== Assists ===
Rank	Name	Team	APG
1.	(Italy) Leonardo Busca	Sicilia Messina	4.9
2.	(Italy) Gianmarco Pozzecco	Skipper Bologna	4.2
3.	(United States) Tyus Edney	Benetton Treviso	3.8
4.	(Italy) Robert Fultz	Skipper Bologna	3.6
5.	(Italy) Fabio Di Bella	Lauretana Biella	3.5

=== Rebounds ===
Rank	Name	Team	RPG
1.	(United States) K'zell Wesson	Euro Roseto	9.5
2.	(United States) Matt Bonner	Sicilia Messina	9.3
3.	(United States) Tyrone Grant	Teramo Basket	8.2
4.	(United States) Marquis Estill	Sicilia Messina	7.8
5.	(United States) Brooks Sales	Teramo Basket	7.5

=== Steals ===
Rank	Name	Team	SPG
1.	(United States) Nate Green	Air Avellino	3.9
2.	(United States) Alvin Sims	Coop Nordest Trieste	3.5
3.	(United States) Jerry McCullough	Metis Varese	3.0
4.	(Argentina) Hugo Sconochini	Breil Milano	3.0
5.	(Italy) Fabio Di Bella	Lauretana Biella	2.7

=== Blocks ===
Rank	Name	Team	BPG
1.	(Nigeria) Benjamin Eze	Tris Reggio Calabria	1.5
2.	(United States) Bud Eley	Scavolini Pesaro	1.3
3.	(Italy) Alessandro Tonolli	Lottomatica Roma	1.1
4.	(Italy) Michele Maggioli	Air Avellino	1.0
5.	(United States) Marquis Estill	Sicilia Messina	1.0

=== Valuation ===
Rank	Name	Team	VPG
1.	(United States) Tyrone Grant	Teramo Basket	24.5
2.	(United States) Matt Bonner	Sicilia Messina	22.8
3.	(United States) Tyus Edney	Benetton Treviso	22.5
4.	(United States) Alphonso Ford	Scavolini Pesaro	21.8
5.	(Spain) Jorge Garbajosa	Benetton Treviso	19.9

== Play-offs ==
Quarterfinals
1	Montepaschi Siena	3
8	Metis Varese	0
4	Scavolini Pesaro	3
5	Pompea Napoli	2
3	Benetton Treviso	3
6	Oregon Scientific Cantù	0
2	Skipper Bologna	3
7	Lottomatica Roma	0

Semifinals
1	Montepaschi Siena	3
4	Scavolini Pesaro	0
2	Skipper Bologna	3
3	Benetton Treviso	0

Finals
1	Montepaschi Siena	3
2	Skipper Bologna	0

=== Montepaschi Siena vs. Metis Varese ===
13 May
20:30

Boxscore

Montepaschi Siena 107, Metis Varese 77
Scoring by quarter: 32–13, 26–20, 22–22, 27–22
Pts: Chiacig, Kakiouzis 21; Rebs: Chiacig 10; Asts: Vrbica Stefanov 8	Pts: Francesco Vescovi 21; Rebs: Dragan Ćeranić 8 Asts: Jerry McCullough 7

PalaEstra, Siena
Referees: Fabio Facchini, Carmelo Paternico, Davide Ramilli

15 May
20:30

Boxscore

Metis Varese 75, Montepaschi Siena 87
Scoring by quarter: 16–19, 17–21, 23–20, 19–27
Pts: Dan Callahan 19; Rebs: Dan Callahan 15; Asts: Daniel Farabello 3	Pts: Bootsy Thornton 22; Rebs: Bootsy Thornton 6 Asts: David Vanterpool 5

PalaWhirlpool, Varese
Referees: Luciano Tola, Enrico Sabetta, Gianluca Mattioli

18 May
20:30

Boxscore

Montepaschi Siena 103, Metis Varese 76
Scoring by quarter: 33–15, 21–18, 27–23, 22–20
Pts: David Vanterpool 23; Rebs: three players 6 Asts: David Vanterpool 8	Pts: Melvin Sanders 21; Rebs: Dan Callahan 9 Asts: Daniel Farabello 4
Siena wins series 3–0

PalaEstra, Siena
Referees: Stefano Cazzaro, Luigi Lamonica, Roberto Nardecchia

=== Scavolini Pesaro vs. Pompea Napoli ===
13 May
20:30

Boxscore

Scavolini Pesaro 79, Pompea Napoli 72
Scoring by quarter: 15–21, 16–24, 19–19, 29–8
Pts: Marko Milič 17; Rebs: Eley, Milič 6 Asts: Aleksandar Đorđević 4	Pts: Mike Penberthy 19; Rebs: Andersen, Davison 6 Asts: Mike Penberthy 4

Adriatic Arena, Pesaro
Referees: Fabio Facchini, Luciano Tola, Paolo Taurino

21 May
20:30

Boxscore

Pompea Napoli 92, Scavolini Pesaro 77
Scoring by quarter: 20–19, 19–18, 29–19, 24–21
Pts: Mike Penberthy 24; Rebs: Óscar Torres 9 Asts: Jerome Allen 4	Pts: Marko Milič 17; Rebs: Marko Milič 9 Asts: Đorđević, Milič 2

PalaBarbuto, Naples
Referees: Giampaolo Cicoria, Guerrino Cerebuch, Massimiliano Filippini

18 May
20:30

Boxscore

Scavolini Pesaro 79, Pompea Napoli 72
Scoring by quarter: 15–21, 16–24, 19–19, 29–8
Pts: Marko Milič 17; Rebs: Eley, Milič 6 Asts: Aleksandar Đorđević 4	Pts: Mike Penberthy 19; Rebs: Andersen, Davison 6 Asts: Mike Penberthy 4

Adriatic Arena, Pesaro
Referees: Fabio Facchini, Luciano Tola, Paolo Taurino

20 May
20:30

Boxscore

Pompea Napoli 86, Scavolini Pesaro 78
Scoring by quarter: 27–21, 19–20, 18–19, 22–18
Pts: Bennett Davison 32; Rebs: Michael Andersen 13; Asts: Jerome Allen 4	Pts: Ford, Scarone 17; Rebs: Milič, Scarone 4 Asts: Đorđević, Scarone 2

PalaBarbuto, Naples
Referees: Alberto Grossi, Luigi Lamonica, Enrico Sabetta

22 May
20:30

Boxscore

Scavolini Pesaro 86, Pompea Napoli 75
Scoring by quarter: 26–22', 18–15, 15–18, 27–20
Pts: Marko Milič 17; Rebs: Bud Eley 9 Asts: Marko Milič 3	Pts: Bennett Davison 22; Rebs: Michael Andersen 6 Asts: three players 2
Pesaro wins series 3–2

Adriatic Arena, Pesaro
Referees: Stefano Cazzaro, Pierluigi D'Este, Guerrino Cerebuch

=== Benetton Treviso vs. Oregon Scientific Cantù ===
13 May
20:30

Boxscore

Benetton Treviso 96, Oregon Scientific Cantù 76
Scoring by quarter: 25–17, 18–22, 32–16, 21–21
Pts: Tyus Edney 21; Rebs: Ademola Okulaja 6 Asts: Riccardo Pittis 7	Pts: Nate Johnson 21; Rebs: Shaun Stonerook 8 Asts: Dante Calabria 4

PalaVerde, Treviso
Referees: Luciano Tola, Paolo Taurino, Massimiliano Filippini

15 May
20:30

Boxscore

Oregon Scientific Cantù 62, Benetton Treviso 70
Scoring by quarter: 16–17, 18–16, 16–11, 12–26
Pts: Nate Johnson 17; Rebs: Shaun Stonerook 7 Asts: Johnson, Stonerook 2	Pts: Ademola Okulaja 18; Rebs: Denis Marconato 8 Asts: Jermaine Jackson 3

Mapooro Arena, Cantù
Referees: Gennaro Colucci, Fabio Facchini, Carmelo Lo Guzzo

18 May
20:30

Boxscore

Benetton Treviso 97, Oregon Scientific Cantù 60
Scoring by quarter: 31–14, 27–16, 17–17, 22–13
Pts: Ademola Okulaja 21; Rebs: Ademola Okulaja 8 Asts: Jermaine Jackson 5	Pts: Nate Johnson 20; Rebs: Sam Hines 11; Asts: Tyson Wheeler 4
Treviso wins series 3–0

PalaVerde, Treviso
Referees: Alberto Grossi, Carmelo Paternico, Gianluca Mattioli

=== Skipper Bologna vs. Lottomatica Roma ===
13 May
20:45

Boxscore

Skipper Bologna 88, Lottomatica Roma 84
Scoring by quarter: 25–16, 19–19, 25–30, 19–19
Pts: Miloš Vujanić 23; Rebs: three players 7 Asts: Carlos Delfino 4	Pts: Marko Tušek 21; Rebs: Tonolli, Tušek 8 Asts: Carlton Myers 4

PalaDozza, Bologna
Referees: Giampaolo Cicoria, Enrico Sabetta, Carmelo Lo Guzzo

15 May
20:30

Boxscore

Lottomatica Roma 73, Skipper Bologna 75
Scoring by quarter: 19–20, 21–19, 13–17, 20–19
Pts: Myers, Tušek 16; Rebs: Jay Larrañaga 6 Asts: Myers, McLeod 4	Pts: Basile, Guyton 17; Rebs: Matjaž Smodiš 7 Asts: Carlos Delfino 2

Palazzetto dello Sport, Rome
Referees: Stefano Cazzaro, Carmelo Paternico, Pierluigi D'Este

18 May
20:30

Boxscore

Skipper Bologna 93, Lottomatica Roma 86
Scoring by quarter: 22–25, 21–24, 15–19, 35–18
Pts: Basile, Guyton 17; Rebs: Matjaž Smodiš 7 Asts: Gianmarco Pozzecco 7	Pts: Carlton Myers 23; Rebs: Luboš Bartoň 6 Asts: Bonora, McLeod 2
Bologna wins series 3–0

PalaDozza, Bologna
Referees: Gennaro Colucci, Guerrino Cerebuch, Silvio Corrias

== Semifinals ==
=== Montepaschi Siena vs. Scavolini Pesaro ===
25 May
20:30

Boxscore

Montepaschi Siena 94, Scavolini Pesaro 67
Scoring by quarter: 20–13, 25–17, 24–22, 25–15
Pts: Vrbica Stefanov 20; Rebs: Roberto Chiacig 8 Asts: Mindaugas Žukauskas 5	Pts: Milič, Đorđević 11; Rebs: Rodney Elliott 6 Asts: Malaventura, Milič 2

PalaEstra, Siena
Referees: Gennaro Colucci, Carmelo Paternico, Carmelo Lo Guzzo

27 May
20:30

Boxscore

Scavolini Pesaro 89, Montepaschi Siena 96
Scoring by quarter: 16–17, 23–34, 27–23, 23–22
Pts: Alphonso Ford 27; Rebs: Bud Eley 8 Asts: Alphonso Ford 2	Pts: Bootsy Thornton 16; Rebs: Andersen, Galanda 6 Asts: Vukčević, Vanterpool 3

Adriatic Arena, Pesaro
Referees: Fabio Facchini, Giampaolo Cicoria, Massimiliano Filippini

29 May
20:30

Boxscore

Montepaschi Siena 100, Scavolini Pesaro 69
Scoring by quarter: 29–20, 29–21, 24–11, 18–17
Pts: Michalis Kakiouzis 20; Rebs: David Andersen 7 Asts: three players 4	Pts: Marko Milič 15; Rebs: Bud Eley 9 Asts: Teemu Rannikko 3
Siena wins series 3–0

PalaEstra, Siena
Referees: Luciano Tola - Alberto Grossi - Guerrino Cerebuch

=== Skipper Bologna vs. Benetton Treviso ===
25 May
20:30

Boxscore

Skipper Bologna 96, Benetton Treviso 87
Scoring by quarter: 27–29, 29–17, 21–25, 19–16
Pts: Gianluca Basile 21; Rebs: Haris Mujezinović 10; Asts: Gianluca Basile 4	Pts: Maurice Evans 36; Rebs: Marconato, Okulaja 6 Asts: Riccardo Pittis 3

PalaDozza, Bologna
Referees: Giampaolo Cicoria, Fabio Facchini, Paolo Taurino

27 May
20:30

Boxscore

Benetton Treviso 77, Skipper Bologna 84
Scoring by quarter: 18–19, 14–25, 22–19, 23–21
Pts: Massimo Bulleri 18; Rebs: Marconato, Okulaja 6 Asts: Marcelo Nicola 5	Pts: Miloš Vujanić 21; Rebs: Carlos Delfino 15; Asts: Goss, Carlos Delfino 5

PalaVerde, Treviso
Referees: Stefano Cazzaro, Pierluigi D'Este, Gianluca Mattioli

29 May
20:30

Boxscore

Skipper Bologna 96, Benetton Treviso 75
Scoring by quarter: 18–18, 27–29, 21–18, 30–10
Pts: Gianluca Basile 32; Rebs: Matjaž Smodiš 7 Asts: Matjaž Smodiš 4	Pts: Uroš Slokar 17; Rebs: three players 5 Asts: Maurice Evans 4
Bologna wins series 3–0

PalaDozza, Bologna
Referees: Gennaro Colucci, Luigi Lamonica, Enrico Sabetta

== Finals ==
=== Montepaschi Siena vs. Skipper Bologna ===
31 May
20:30

Boxscore

Montepaschi Siena 80, Skipper Bologna 70
Scoring by quarter: 11–18, 26–22, 21–8, 22–22
Pts: Vrbica Stefanov 18; Rebs: Thornton, Vanterpool 5 Asts: Thornton, Žukauskas 4	Pts: Carlos Delfino 22; Rebs: Delfino, Smodiš 6 Asts: Miloš Vujanić 4

PalaEstra, Siena
Referees: Gennaro Colucci, Giampaolo Cicoria, Enrico Sabetta

2 June
20:30

Boxscore

Skipper Bologna 68, Montepaschi Siena 75
Scoring by quarter: 20–26, 16–19, 24–10, 8–20
Pts: Carlos Delfino 15; Rebs: Delfino, Mancinelli 6 Asts: Miloš Vujanić 4	Pts: Bootsy Thornton 26; Rebs: Andersen, Thornton 7 Asts: Stefanov, Thornton 2

PalaDozza, Bologna
Referees: Fabio Facchini, Luciano Tola, Guerrino Cerebuch

5 June
15:30

Boxscore

Montepaschi Siena 92, Skipper Bologna 63
Scoring by quarter: 18–14, 26–21, 26–18, 22–10
Pts: Bootsy Thornton 30; Rebs: David Andersen 11; Asts: Vrbica Stefanov 3	Pts: Carlos Delfino 21; Rebs: three players 5 Asts: Miloš Vujanić 4
Siena wins series 3–0

PalaEstra, Siena
Referees: Stefano Cazzaro, Luigi Lamonica, Carmelo Parternico

== Supercup ==
The Italian Basketball Supercup opened the season on September 27, 2003 in the PalaVerde in Treviso, it pitted reigning champions and 2002-03 cup holders Benetton Treviso against Oregon Scientific Cantù, finalists in the previous year's cup. Cantù upset Benetton 85-79 to win its first trophy in 12 years, with Nate Johnson named MVP for his first game in Italy.

== All Star Game ==
The All Star Game was played in Genoa on December 13, 2004 in the newly opened PalaFiumara. The foreign All Stars beat Italy, bronze medalists at EuroBasket 2003, 106-99 after coming back from behind 55-26 down to force an overtime. Maurice Evans was designated MVP whilst Michele Mian won the three point shootout.

== Cup ==
The Cup was contested between 25 February and 28 February in the PalaFiera(in Italian) in Forlì between the 8 best ranked teams of the first phase of the league. Benetton Treviso won the cup for the second successive season, beating Scavolini Pesaro 85-76, Jorge Garbajosa was named as the Final Eight MVP.

== Awards ==
- Most Valuable Player:

(Italy) Gianluca Basile (Skipper Bologna)

- Coach of the year:

(Italy) Carlo Recalcati (Montepaschi Siena)

- Finals MVP:

(Australia) David Andersen (Montepaschi Siena)
