= Matteo Boniciolli =

Kazakhstani basketball coach

Scafati Basket
- Position: Coach
- League: LBA

Personal information
- Born: April 18, 1962 (age 64) Trieste, Friuli-Venezia Giulia Italy
- Coaching career: 1996–present

Career history

Coaching
- 1996–1999: Italy (assistant)
- 1999–2001: Snaidero Udine
- 2001–2003: Fortitudo Bologna
- 2003–2004: Sicilia Messina
- 2004–2006: Telindus Oostende
- 2005–2006: Navigo.it Teramo
- 2006–2008: Air Avellino
- 2008–2009: Virtus Bologna
- 2009–2011: Lottomatica Roma
- 2011–2013: BC Astana
- 2013: Kazakhstan
- 2015–2018: Fortitudo Bologna
- 2019–2020: VL Pesaro
- 2020–2022: APU Udine
- 2023–present: Scafati Basket

Career highlights
- As coach: Serie A Best Coach (2008); Italian Cup (2008); EuroChallenge (2009); 2× Kazakhstani League (2012, 2013); 3× Kazakhstani Cup (2011–2013)

Matteo Boniciolli (born 18 April 1962) is an Italian basketball coach of Scafati Basket in the Italian Lega Basket Serie A (LBA).

He has been a head coach since 1999, guiding several clubs in Italy and abroad to titles, also having taken charge of the Italian national team (as an assistant) and the Kazakhstan national team.

== Coaching career ==
The Trieste native started his career in his home town with local clubs, as assistant coach or in charge of youth squads. In the same city he encountered Bogdan Tanjević, who would help him join the Italian national team setup as coach of the Under-17 team and assistant coach of the senior side. In that latter role he would be part of the team's run to the EuroBasket 1999 gold medal.

He then moved to club coaching as head coach of Snaidero Udine in the second division Serie A2 in 1999. He led the Fruili side to the first division Serie A in his first season there, finishing seventh in the league the next year and earning a playoff spot.

These performances caught the eye of Fortitudo Bologna who recruited him in 2001. With Fortitudo he would win the regular season in 2001-2002 but lost in the playoff finals. He was dismissed the next season after a run of poor results.

He started the 2003-04 season at the helm of Sicilia Messina but left after 16 games due to struggles on and off the pitch for the club.

The Italian then moved abroad, joining Telindus Oostende of the Belgian League the same year. He reached the Belgian Cup final and the league semifinal the same year. However he was dismissed by the Belgians in April 2005.

He then spent an uneventful season with Navigo.it Teramo back in Italy, finishing the league in midtable.

Boniciolli was appointed coach of Air Avellino in 2006, he helped the side win the Italian Cup in 2008, the first title in the club's history. This performance saw him awarded as the league's best coach for 2007-08.

Joining Virtus Bologna the next season, he also led them a title, the European third tier 2008–09 FIBA EuroChallenge. In doing so he became the first coach since Ettore Messina to win a European title with the Bologna side.

He was named head coach of Serie A and Euroleague side Lottomatica Roma in December 2009, replacing Ferdinando Gentile. Roma and Boniciolli parted ways in January 2011 despite him guiding the side to the Euroleague Top 16.

Boniociolli moved to newly formed Kazakhstani side BC Astana in April 2011 to compete in both the Kazakhstani League and the VTB United League. He helped guide the Astana side to two consecutive domestic doubles (league and cup) and a VTB United League playoff appearance in only its second tournament appearance in 2013.

Following his success with Astana, he was appointed to lead the Kazakhstan national team, he guided them to an 80-60 victory over Uzbekistan in May 2013 to qualify for the 2013 FIBA Asia Championship. With the aim of earning a place in the 2014 FIBA Basketball World Cup at the tournament, Kazakhstan won their first three games to reach the next round, however they then lost the next six to finish in 8th place.

However Astana and Boniciolli ended their contract by mutual agreement in December 2013, with the side sitting in 9th place in Group B of the VTB United League after winning the cup for the third time.

In February 2015, Boniciolli returned to Fortitudo, by now in the third division Serie B, a few months the club won the playoffs to earn a promotion to the A2.

On January 8, 2019, Boniciolli became new head-coach of VL Pesaro in LBA, the Italian highest basketball league.
