= Marco Solfrini =

Italian basketball player (1958–2018)

Personal information
- Born: 30 January 1958 Brescia, Italy
- Died: 24 March 2018 (aged 60) Parma, Italy
- Listed height: 6 ft 5 in (1.96 m)
- Listed weight: 200 lb (91 kg)

Career information
- Playing career: 1977–1994
- Position: Small forward
- Number: 13, 15

Career history
- 1977–1982: Basket Brescia
- 1982–1986: Virtus Roma
- 1986–1988: A.P.U. Udine
- 1988–1991: Fabriano Basket
- 1991–1994: Mens Sana Basket

Career highlights
- FIBA Intercontinental Cup champion (1984); EuroLeague champion (1984); FIBA Korać Cup champion (1986); Italian League champion (1983)
Medals
Men's Basketball
Representing Italy (partial support)
Summer Olympic Games
Silver medal – second place	1980 Moscow
Mediterranean Games
Silver medal – second place	1983 Casablanca

Marco Solfrini (30 January 1958 – 24 March 2018) was an Italian professional basketball player and basketball executive. During his playing career, he played at the small forward position.

== Professional career ==
With the Italian club Virtus Roma, Solfrini won the EuroLeague championship in 1984, as well as the 1984 edition of the FIBA Intercontinental Cup. Solfrini ended his pro club career in 1994. The last team he played with was the Italian club Mens Sana Siena.

== National team career ==
As a member of the senior men's Italian national basketball team, Solfrini won the silver medal at the 1980 Moscow Summer Olympics.

== Executive career ==
On 2 July 2009, Solfrini was appointed to the position of sporting director of the Italian basketball club Brescia.

== Death ==
Solfrini died due to an illness, in Parma, Italy, on 24 March 2018.
