= Marshawn =

Marshawn or Marshon is a masculine given name. Notable people with the name include:

- MarShon Brooks (born 1989), American basketball player
- Mardy Gilyard (born 1986), American football player
- Marshawn Kneeland (2001–2025), American football player
- Marshon Lattimore (born 1996), American football player
- MarShawn Lloyd (born 2001), American football player
- Marshawn Lynch (born 1986), American football player
- Marshawn Powell (born 1990), American basketball player
