= APU Udine =

APU Old Wild West Udine
- League: LBA
- Founded: 2011
- History: Amici Pallacanestro Udinese; 2011–present
- Arena: PalaCarnera
- Capacity: 3,470
- Location: Udine, Italy
- Team colors: White, Black and Orange
- Main sponsor: Old Wild West
- President: Alessandro Pedone
- Head coach: Adriano Vertemati
- Team captain: Mirza Alibegović
- Championships: 1 Italian LNP Cup
- Website: apudine.it
| Home | Away |

APU Udine, officially Amici Pallacanestro Udinese, also known for sponsorship reasons as APU Old Wild West Udine, is an Italian professional basketball team of the city of Udine, Friuli-Venezia Giulia. The team currently plays in LBA, Italy's national top–tier league. Despite being a distinct club, APU Udine de facto inherited the fanbase of Snaidero Udine, the historic club of the town dissolved in 2011.

== History ==
=== 2011–2016: Beginnings within the minor leagues ===
Amici Pallacanestro Udinese was founded on 29 June 2011; the club's aim was to inherit the fanbase of Associazione Pallacanestro Udinese, better known for sponsorship reasons as Snaidero Udine, a historic club of the Italian Serie A. The acronym APU is in fact the same used in the past for the previous city's club.

After five seasons within the minor leagues of Italian basketball, on 11 June 2016, the team, led by coach Lino Lardo, won the Final Four in Montecatini Terme, defeating Forlì and achieving the promotion to Serie A2, Italy's national second league.

=== 2016–present: Years in Serie A2 ===
In the 2016–17 season, coach Lino Lardo and his staff were fully confirmed. Moreover, the backbone of the roster was confirmed too: Manuel Vanuzzo, Joel Zacchetti, Riccardo Truccolo, Mauro Pinton, Michele Ferrari and Vittorio Nobile were joined by Gino Cuccarolo, Andrea Traini and the two American players, Stan Okoye and Allan Ray. The results, albeit fluctuating, allowed Udine to always stay outside the play-out area.

In the following season, the roster was largely confirmed and Udine succeeded in reaching the playoffs for the first time in its history. However, after having ousted 3–1 Derthona Basket in the eightfinals, APU Udine was eliminated 1–3 by Junior Casale in the quarterfinals.

In 2018–19 season, Demis Cavina became the new head coach of the team, while the roster was notably completed with the shooting guard Trevis Simpson, the power forward Marshawn Powell, as well as the Italian point guard Lorenzo Penna and the Serbian-Italian small forward Stefan Nikolić. In January 2019, Cavina was sacked and Alberto Martellossi was signed as new coach. In the following playoffs, Udine was eliminated 3–1 by Pallacanestro Biella in the first round.

In May 2019, Alessandro Ramagli was appointed as new head coach of the team. Moreover, the club signed Michele Antonutti, a veteran Italian power forward, the American center Gerald Beverly and the shooting guard T. J. Cromer. However, the season was later cancelled in March 2020, due to the broke out of the COVID-19 pandemic in Italy.

In June 2020, Matteo Boniciolli became the new coach. Beyond Antonutti and Andrea Amato, the roster was notably completed with two Italian point guards, Marco Giuri and Federico Mussini, the American shooting guard Dominique Johnson and the center Nana Foulland. For the playoffs the club signed also the Italian guard Fabio Mian. The team lost the Italian LNP Cup final against Basket Napoli for 80–69. Moreover, in the playoffs, Udine ousted 3–1 Trapani in the quarterfinals and 3–2 Scafati Basket in the semifinals. However, it was eliminated 3–1 by Basket Napoli in the finals.

For the first time in the history, the club promoted to LBA which they clinched as a top seed in Serie A2 during the 2024–25 season after 16 years which their last appearance since the 2008–09 season; which their previous team, Pallalcesto Amatori Udine previously played since until they pulled out from professional basketball in 2011 and it merged the club after.

== Roster ==
=== Current roster ===
Note: Flags indicate national team eligibility at FIBA-sanctioned events. Players may hold other non-FIBA nationalities not displayed.

APU Old Wild West Udine roster
Players
Coaches

| Pos. | No. | Nat. | Name | Ht. | Wt. | Age |
|---|---|---|---|---|---|---|
| F | 3 | (Ivory Coast) (Italy) | Mobio, Joseph | 1.98 m (6 ft 6 in) | | 29 – 10 June 1997 |
| PF | 6 | (United States) | Spencer, Skylar | 2.06 m (6 ft 9 in) | | 32 – 11 July 1994 |
| PG | 11 | (Slovenia) | Šiško, Žan Mark | 1.91 m (6 ft 3 in) | | 29 – 29 June 1997 |
| F | 15 | (Italy) | Pavan, Alessandro | 2.06 m (6 ft 9 in) | | 18 – 2 January 2008 |
| SG | 21 | (Italy) | Bucarelli, Lorenzo | 1.98 m (6 ft 6 in) | | 28 – 6 March 1998 |
| G/F | 22 | (Lithuania) | Bendžius, Eimantas | 2.00 m (6 ft 7 in) | | 36 – 23 April 1990 |
| G | 24 | (United States) | Battle, RaeQuan | 1.96 m (6 ft 5 in) | | 25 – 19 February 2001 |
| PF | 26 | (United States) | McGlynn, Nick | 2.03 m (6 ft 8 in) | | 30 – 6 October 1996 |
| F | 30 | (Italy) | Grassi, Mattia | 1.98 m (6 ft 6 in) | | 19 – 5 October 2007 |
| F | 31 | (Italy) | Calzavara, Andrea | 1.96 m (6 ft 5 in) | | 24 – 16 December 2001 |
| G/F | 34 | (Italy) | Cavallero, Matteo | 1.98 m (6 ft 6 in) | | 23 – 12 May 2003 |
| F | 45 | (United States) | Valentine, Denzel | 1.93 m (6 ft 4 in) | | 32 – 16 November 1993 |

Head coach

- (Italy) Adriano Vertemati

Assistant coach(es)

- (Italy) Giorgio Gerosa
- (Italy) Lorenzo Pomes

Athletic trainer(s)

- (Italy) Daniele Missarelli

Legend

- (C) Team captain
- Injured

- Roster
Updated: October 31, 2026

== Honours ==
Serie A2

- Champions (1): 2024–25
- Runners-up (2): 2020–21, 2021–22

Italian LNP Cup

- Winners (1): 2022
- Runners-up (1): 2021
