= Michele Antonutti =

Italian basketball player (born 1986)

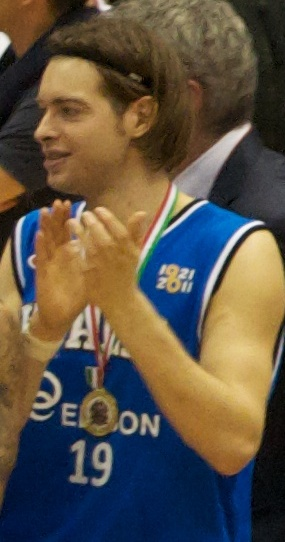
- Antonutti with Italy in 2011

Personal information
- Born: 19 February 1986 (age 40) Udine, Italy
- Listed height: 2.03 m (6 ft 8 in)
- Listed weight: 96 kg (212 lb)

Career information
- Playing career: 2002–2023
- Position: Small forward

Career history
- 2002–2009: Snaidero Udine
- 2009–2012: Sutor Montegranaro
- 2012–2014: Reggiana
- 2014–2015: Juvecaserta
- 2015–2019: Pistoia
- 2019–2023: APU Udine

Career highlights
- EuroChallenge champion (2014)

Michele Antonutti (born 19 February 1986) is an Italian former professional basketball player. He played at the small forward position.

== Professional career ==
Michele Antonutti's turning point of his player's career coincided with the move in 2002 to Snaidero Udine, where he played for eight years in ULEB Cup, Italian Basketball Cup and Italian Playoffs.

In 2009 he wento to Montegranaro participating to the Playoffs and the Italian Cup. With the shirt of Montegranaro he played 71 matches and made 320 points.

On 9 February 2012 Antonutti signed an agreement with Pallacanestro Reggiana for one year. In Reggio Emilia achieved the promotion to Serie A, and on 28 February 2013 he renewed the contract with the club up to 2015. In April 2014 he won the EuroChallenge as captain of team.

After that season, he left the Emilian team and he trained for some weeks with Fulgor Libertas Forlì, but in November 2014 went to Caserta after getting the resolution with Reggio Emilia. At the moment of his arrival Juvecaserta had collected 0 wins and 13 defeats, however the Club got the salvation for just one win of difference.

In summer 2015, Michele Antonutti arrives in Pistoia, where he was appointed as new captain.

=== Italy National Team ===
As well as in some club teams, previously Antonutti had served as captain also in Under-20 Italy national basketball team. He was the teammates of many international talents such as Andrea Bargnani and Marco Belinelli. In 2007 he was called in the senior team, under the guidance of coach Carlo Recalcati. With the shirt of the national team in 2011 he took part in the Lega Basket All Star Game in Milan.

== Honours and titles ==
=== Team ===
- EuroChallenge winner (1): 2014
