= Mike Penberthy =

American basketball player (born 1974)

Personal information
- Born: November 29, 1974 (age 51) Los Gatos, California, U.S.
- Listed height: 6 ft 3 in (1.91 m)
- Listed weight: 180 lb (82 kg)

Career information
- High school: Herbert Hoover (Fresno, California)
- College: The Master's (1993–1997)
- NBA draft: 1997: undrafted
- Playing career: 1997–2012
- Position: Point guard
- Number: 12

Career history

Playing
- 1997–1998: BCJ Hamburg Tigers
- 1998–1999: Quad City Thunder
- 1999: Cocodrilos de Caracas
- 1999–2000: BCJ Hamburg Tigers
- 2000–2001: Los Angeles Lakers
- 2002–2005: Pompea Napoli
- 2005–2006: Alba Berlin
- 2006–2007: Snaidero Cucine Udine
- 2007: Bipop Carire Reggio Emilia
- 2007–2008: Snaidero Udine
- 2011–2012: Los Angeles Slam

Coaching
- 2018–2019: New Orleans Pelicans (assistant)
- 2019–2022: Los Angeles Lakers (assistant)
- 2022–2025: Denver Nuggets (shooting coach)
- 2025–2026: Dallas Mavericks (assistant)

Career highlights
- As player: NBA champion (2001); German Cup champion (2006); 2× First-team NAIA All-American (1996, 1997); As assistant coach: 2× NBA champion (2020, 2023)
- Stats at NBA.com
- Stats at Basketball Reference

Michael Dunkin Penberthy (born November 29, 1974) is an American professional basketball coach and former player. A point guard from The Master's College (now The Master's University), Penberthy went undrafted in the 1997 NBA draft but played for the Los Angeles Lakers, winning an NBA championship in 2001. He later transitioned into coaching, serving as a shooting coach for the Denver Nuggets and an assistant coach for the Los Angeles Lakers.

== Early life and college ==
Born in Los Gatos, California, Penberthy graduated from Herbert Hoover High School at Fresno, California in 1993. He played college basketball for The Master's College in Santa Clarita, California, where he played with distinction, broke numerous school records (including most career points), was a two-time NAIA All-American, and was later a charter member of the college for the 2003–2004 season. He held the NAIA record for consecutive games with at least one three-pointer made, with 111, until it was broken in December 2005 by Brandon Cole of John Brown University. He graduated from The Master's College in 1997 with a B.A. degree in biblical studies.

== Professional career ==
Penberthy tried out for the Indiana Pacers and tore his right hamstring; he took three months off and joined the Continental Basketball Association (CBA) team Idaho Stampede, which drafted him from college. The Stampede cut Penberthy, who said he "hated" playing there, without any game appearances and he transferred to the Hamburg Tigers in Germany.

During the summer of 1998, when the NBA locked out its players, Penberthy worked as a forklift driver at Turf Tek, a company managed by one of his cousins. The following fall, Penberthy joined sports ministry Athletes in Action and the CBA team Quad City Thunder, but was cut due to a sprained right ankle. From April to June 1999, Penberthy played for the Venezuelan team Cocodrilos de Caracas. He returned to the Hamburg Tigers for the 1999-2000 season.

In his NBA career, Penberthy played in 56 games, all with the Lakers, and had averages of 4.9 points, 1.3 assists and 1.2 rebounds per game while playing 15.4 minutes per game on average. He won an NBA championship with the team in 2000–01.

The Lakers waived Penberthy on November 10, 2001. Afterwards, he played basketball in Italy and Germany and competed in the ULEB Cups of 2005, 2006, and 2007. While with Alba Berlin, Penberthy helped the team win the German Cup of 2006. In 2011, Penberthy signed with the Los Angeles Slam of the ABA.

== Coaching career ==
In the 2014–15 season, Penberthy was the shooting coach for the Minnesota Timberwolves. In the 2018–19 season, Penberthy was the shooting coach for the New Orleans Pelicans. On July 31, 2019, Penberthy was hired as an assistant coach for the Los Angeles Lakers. Penberthy won his second championship when the Lakers defeated the Miami Heat in the 2020 NBA Finals in six games.

In 2022, he started working as a shooting coach and pro scout for the Denver Nuggets.

On July 5, 2025, Penberthy joined head coach Jason Kidd's coaching staff with the Dallas Mavericks, alongside former NBA champion head coach Frank Vogel. He left in July 2026.

== Personal life ==
Penberthy married Wendy Jones, who attended The Master's College with him and played volleyball for the college. They have three children, Ty, Jaden, and Kate.

== Career statistics ==
Legend
GP	Games played	GS	Games started	MPG	Minutes per game
FG%	Field goal percentage	3P%	3-point field goal percentage	FT%	Free throw percentage
RPG	Rebounds per game	APG	Assists per game	SPG	Steals per game
BPG	Blocks per game	PPG	Points per game	**Bold**	Career high
†	Won an NBA championship

=== NBA ===
==== Regular season ====
Year	Team	GP	GS	MPG	FG%	3P%	FT%	RPG	APG	SPG	BPG	PPG
2000–01†	L.A. Lakers	**53**	0	**16.1**	.414	**.396**	**.903**	**1.2**	**1.3**	.4	.0	**5.0**
2001–02	L.A. Lakers	3	0	4.0	**.500**	–	.750	.7	.7	**.7**	.0	1.7
Career		56	0	16.7	.415	.396	.886	1.2	1.3	.4	.0	4.9
