= Vincent Yarbrough =

American basketball player (born 1981)

Personal information
- Born: March 21, 1981 (age 45) Cleveland, Tennessee, U.S.
- Listed height: 6 ft 7 in (2.01 m)
- Listed weight: 210 lb (95 kg)

Career information
- High school: Cleveland (Cleveland, Tennessee)
- College: Tennessee (1998–2002)
- NBA draft: 2002: 2nd round, 33rd overall pick
- Drafted by: Denver Nuggets
- Playing career: 2002–2010
- Position: Small forward
- Number: 3

Career history
- 2002–2003: Denver Nuggets
- 2003–2004: Sicilia Messina
- 2004–2005: Telindus Oostende
- 2005–2006: Viola Reggio Calabria
- 2006–2007: Brose Baskets
- 2007–2008: EnBW Ludwigsburg
- 2008–2010: Telekom Baskets Bonn

Career highlights
- First-team All-SEC (2002); 2× Second-team All-SEC (2000, 2001); McDonald's All-American Game (1998); First-team Parade All-American (1998); Tennessee Mr. Basketball (1998)
- Stats at NBA.com
- Stats at Basketball Reference

Vincent Raymond Yarbrough (born March 21, 1981) is an American former professional basketball player who played in the NBA and Europe.

The 6'7" and 210 lb forward out of the University of Tennessee was selected as the fourth pick of the second round (33rd overall) of the 2002 NBA draft by the Denver Nuggets. He played 59 games with them during 2002–03 (his only season in the NBA), averaging 6.9 points, 2.7 rebounds and 2.2 assists per game.

Yarbrough's final NBA game was on April 16, 2003, in an 84–89 loss to the Houston Rockets where he recorded 8 points, 9 rebounds and 8 assists.

Yarbrough also played with Oostende of the Belgian basketball league and in Italy with Sicilia Messina and Viola Reggio Calabria.

In the 2006–07 season, Yarbrough played for the German team Brose Baskets in Bamberg, Bavaria after signing for the team in July 2006.

In July 2008, Yarbrough was signed by Telekom Baskets Bonn for the 2008–09 season.
