= 2003 ULEB Cup Finals =

2003 ULEB Cup finals
- Event: 2002–03 ULEB Cup
Krka	Pamesa Valencia
(Slovenia)	(Spain)
154	168

First leg
Krka	Pamesa Valencia
78	90
- Date: April 15, 2003
- Venue: Leon Štukelj Hall, Novo Mesto
- MVP: (Serbia and Montenegro) Dejan Tomašević
- Attendance: 2,000

Second leg
Pamesa Valencia	Krka
78	76
- Date: April 24, 2003
- Venue: Fuente San Luis, Valencia
- Attendance: 9,250

The 2003 ULEB Cup finals were the final matches of the 2002–03 ULEB Cup season, the first season of Europe's second tier basketball league.

Pamesa Valencia won the Finals with an aggregate score of 166–156 against Krka. Valencia's Dejan Tomašević was named the Eurocup Finals MVP.

== Summary ==
Game	Home team	Sore	Away team	Venue	Attendance	Date
1	Krka (Slovenia)	78–90	(Spain) Pamesa Valencia	Leon Štukelj Hall, Novo Mesto	2,000	April 15, 2003
2	Pamesa Valencia (Spain)	78–76	(Slovenia) Krka	Fuente San Luis, Valencia	9,250	April 24, 2003
