= 2002–03 ULEB Cup =

Inaugural season of ULEB Cup

- Season: 2002–03
- Duration: 15 October 2002 – 24 April 2003 (competition proper)
- Games played: 150
- Teams: 24 (competition proper)

Finals
- Champions: (Spain) Pamesa Valencia (1st title)
- Runners-up: (Slovenia) Krka
- Finals MVP: (Serbia and Montenegro) Dejan Tomašević

Statistical leaders
| Points | (United States) Jamie Arnold | 20.3 |
| Rebounds | (United States) K'zell Wesson | 12.7 |
| Assists | (United States) Scooter Barry | 5.3 |
| Index Rating | (Australia) Chris Anstey | 24.1 |

The 2002–03 ULEB Cup was the inaugural season of Europe's secondary level professional club basketball tournament, the ULEB Cup, which is organised by Euroleague Basketball. The 2003 ULEB Cup Finals were played between Pamesa Valencia and Krka, and won by Valencia, their first title in a European-wide competition. As the winners of the 2002–03 ULEB Cup, Valencia qualified for the European top-tier level 2003–04 Euroleague.

== Team allocation ==
A total of 24 teams from 10 countries, instead of the initial 32, participated in the 2002–03 ULEB Cup. The majority of champion teams that could not play in the Euroleague chose to compete in the 2002–03 FIBA Europe Champions Cup, apart from the champions of Russia, Netherlands and Belgium. The inaugural ULEB Cup also didn't feature teams from Greece, Lithuania and Israel as they chose to play in FIBA's competition.

=== Distribution ===
The table below shows the default access list.

| | Teams entering in this round | Teams advancing from previous round |
|---|---|---|
| Regular season (32 teams) | 4 best-placed teams from Spain; 4 best-placed teams from Italy; 4 best-placed teams from Greece; 3 best-placed teams from France; 3 best-placed teams from Adriatic; 2 best-placed teams from Germany; 2 best-placed teams from Belgium; 2 best-placed teams from Portugal; 1 best-placed team from Turkey; 1 best-placed team from Israel; 1 best-placed team from Russia; 1 best-placed team from Yugoslavia; 1 best-placed team from Poland; 1 best-placed team from Switzerland; 1 best-placed team from Great Britain; 1 best-placed team from Netherlands | |
| Elimination rounds (16 teams) | | 4 group winners from the regular season; 4 group runners-up from the regular season; 4 group third-placed teams from the regular season; 4 group fourth-placed teams from the regular season |

=== Teams ===
League positions after Playoffs of the previous season shown in parentheses:

Regular season
| (Spain) Adecco Estudiantes (4th) | (Italy) Eurocellulari Roseto (9th) | (Germany) RheinEnergie Köln (2nd) | (Slovenia) Pivovarna Laško (3rd) |
| (Spain) Pamesa Valencia (6th) | (Italy) Metis Varese (10th) | (Germany) Telekom Baskets Bonn (3rd) | (Croatia) Zadar (2nd) |
| (Spain) Jabones Pardo Fuenlabrada (7th) | (Italy) Snaidero Udine (12th) | (Germany) Opel Skyliners (4th) | (Netherlands) Ricoh Astronauts (1st) |
| (Spain) Caprabo Lleida (8th) | (France) Cholet (3rd) | (Belgium) Telindus Oostende (1st) | (Russia) Ural Great (1st) |
| (Spain) DKV Joventut (9th) | (France) Élan Sportif Chalon (4th) | (Belgium) Spirou Charleroi (2nd) | (Serbia and Montenegro) FMP Železnik (3rd) |
| (Italy) Generali Group Trieste (7th) | (France) Gravelines (5th) | (Slovenia) Krka (2nd) | (Turkey) Darüssafaka (3rd) |

== Round and draw dates ==
The schedule of the competition was as follows.

| Phase | Round | Draw date | First leg | Second leg |
|---|---|---|---|---|
| Regular season | Round 1 | 16 July 2002 | 15 October 2002 | |
| Regular season | Round 2 | 16 July 2002 | 22 October 2002 | |
| Regular season | Round 3 | 16 July 2002 | 29 October 2002 | |
| Regular season | Round 4 | 16 July 2002 | 5 November 2002 | |
| Regular season | Round 5 | 16 July 2002 | 12 November 2002 | |
| Regular season | Round 6 | 16 July 2002 | 3 December 2002 | |
| Regular season | Round 7 | 16 July 2002 | 10 December 2002 | |
| Regular season | Round 8 | 16 July 2002 | 17 December 2002 | |
| Regular season | Round 9 | 16 July 2002 | 7 January 2003 | |
| Regular season | Round 10 | 16 July 2002 | 14 January 2003 | |
| Elimination rounds | Eighthfinals | 15 January 2003 | 4 February 2003 | 11 February 2003 |
| Elimination rounds | Quarterfinals | 15 January 2003 | 25 February 2003 | 4 March 2003 |
| Elimination rounds | Semifinals | 15 January 2003 | 18 March 2003 | 25 March 2003 |
| Elimination rounds | Finals | 15 January 2003 | 15 April 2003 | 24 April 2003 |

== Regular season ==
In each group, teams played against each other home-and-away in a round-robin format. The four first qualified teams advanced to the elimination rounds, while the two last teams were eliminated.

=== Group A ===
| Pos | Team | Pld | W | L | PF | PA | PD | Pts | Qualification | GRA | JOV | URA | UDI | BON | FUE |
|---|---|---|---|---|---|---|---|---|---|---|---|---|---|---|---|
| 1 | (France) Gravelines | 10 | 7 | 3 | 851 | 796 | +55 | 17 | Advance to elimination rounds | — | 88–82 | 86–68 | 91–83 | 88–63 | 83–72 |
| 2 | (Spain) DKV Joventut | 10 | 6 | 4 | 837 | 824 | +13 | 16 | Advance to elimination rounds | 95–87 | — | 94–82 | 77–69 | 88–72 | 87–82 |
| 3 | (Russia) Ural Great | 10 | 5 | 5 | 877 | 824 | +53 | 15 | Advance to elimination rounds | 87–94 | 101–73 | — | 86–61 | 96–84 | 117–89 |
| 4 | (Italy) Snaidero Udine | 10 | 5 | 5 | 823 | 805 | +18 | 15 | Advance to elimination rounds | 84–67 | 84–90 | 90–86 | — | 92–78 | 93–64 |
| 5 | (Germany) Telekom Baskets Bonn | 10 | 4 | 6 | 786 | 845 | −59 | 14 | | 84–80 | 81–78 | 72–64 | 76–84 | — | 99–81 |
| 6 | (Spain) Jabones Pardo Fuenlabrada | 10 | 3 | 7 | 809 | 889 | −80 | 13 | | 78–87 | 78–73 | 81–90 | 90–83 | 94–77 | — |

Source: ULEB Cup
Legend: Blue = home team win; Red = away team win.

=== Group B ===
| Pos | Team | Pld | W | L | PF | PA | PD | Pts | Qualification | FMP | VAL | ROS | LAŠ | SKY | OOS |
|---|---|---|---|---|---|---|---|---|---|---|---|---|---|---|---|
| 1 | (Serbia and Montenegro) FMP Železnik | 10 | 9 | 1 | 796 | 669 | +127 | 19 | Advance to elimination rounds | — | 80–67 | 78–76 | 81–62 | 82–60 | 92–52 |
| 2 | (Spain) Pamesa Valencia | 10 | 8 | 2 | 847 | 710 | +137 | 18 | Advance to elimination rounds | 85–61 | — | 98–62 | 93–74 | 94–66 | 90–69 |
| 3 | (Italy) Eurocellulari Roseto | 10 | 5 | 5 | 786 | 778 | +8 | 15 | Advance to elimination rounds | 72–82 | 77–57 | — | 89–76 | 84–79 | 85–69 |
| 4 | (Slovenia) Pivovarna Laško | 10 | 4 | 6 | 751 | 828 | −77 | 14 | Advance to elimination rounds | 59–89 | 78–83 | 79–77 | — | 85–81 | 76–68 |
| 5 | (Germany) Opel Skyliners | 10 | 3 | 7 | 731 | 795 | −64 | 13 | | 59–68 | 63–72 | 83–78 | 75–68 | — | 90–79 |
| 6 | (Belgium) Telindus Oostende | 10 | 1 | 9 | 748 | 879 | −131 | 11 | | 77–83 | 80–108 | 77–86 | 92–94 | 85–75 | — |

Source: ULEB Cup
Legend: Blue = home team win; Red = away team win.

=== Group C ===
| Pos | Team | Pld | W | L | PF | PA | PD | Pts | Qualification | KRK | EST | KOL | TRI | CHA | DAR |
|---|---|---|---|---|---|---|---|---|---|---|---|---|---|---|---|
| 1 | (Slovenia) Krka | 10 | 7 | 3 | 869 | 802 | +67 | 17 | Advance to elimination rounds | — | 92–74 | 85–75 | 101–83 | 75–71 | 79–76 |
| 2 | (Spain) Adecco Estudiantes | 10 | 7 | 3 | 890 | 794 | +96 | 17 | Advance to elimination rounds | 88–79 | — | 87–66 | 121–76 | 76–78 | 105–79 |
| 3 | (Germany) RheinEnergie Köln | 10 | 6 | 4 | 814 | 811 | +3 | 16 | Advance to elimination rounds | 87–83 | 79–74 | — | 84–80 | 86–76 | 98–60 |
| 4 | (Italy) Generali Group Trieste | 10 | 4 | 6 | 806 | 849 | −43 | 14 | Advance to elimination rounds | 70–87 | 78–85 | 86–88 | — | 75–68 | 84–72 |
| 5 | (France) Élan Chalon | 10 | 4 | 6 | 785 | 821 | −36 | 14 | | 102–99 | 72–78 | 91–85 | 70–88 | — | 78–75 |
| 6 | (Turkey) Darüşşafaka | 10 | 2 | 8 | 779 | 866 | −87 | 12 | | 76–89 | 95–102 | 89–66 | 73–86 | 84–79 | — |

Source: ULEB Cup
Legend: Blue = home team win; Red = away team win.

=== Group D ===
| Pos | Team | Pld | W | L | PF | PA | PD | Pts | Qualification | VAR | LLE | SPI | ZAD | CHO | AMS |
|---|---|---|---|---|---|---|---|---|---|---|---|---|---|---|---|
| 1 | (Italy) Metis Varese | 10 | 6 | 4 | 784 | 769 | +15 | 16 | Advance to elimination rounds | — | 87–78 | 75–69 | 88–86 | 81–76 | 80–72 |
| 2 | (Spain) Caprabo Lleida | 10 | 6 | 4 | 838 | 794 | +44 | 16 | Advance to elimination rounds | 82–78 | — | 72–76 | 85–77 | 99–84 | 89–67 |
| 3 | (Belgium) Spirou | 10 | 6 | 4 | 780 | 764 | +16 | 16 | Advance to elimination rounds | 79–71 | 75–87 | — | 80–66 | 98–90 | 67–77 |
| 4 | (Croatia) Zadar | 10 | 5 | 5 | 794 | 828 | −34 | 15 | Advance to elimination rounds | 73–71 | 81–79 | 66–86 | — | 91–90 | 90–80 |
| 5 | (France) Cholet | 10 | 4 | 6 | 830 | 820 | +10 | 14 | | 85–74 | 93–79 | 94–73 | 75–65 | — | 72–74 |
| 6 | (Netherlands) Ricoh Astronauts | 10 | 3 | 7 | 761 | 812 | −51 | 13 | | 69–79 | 76–88 | 66–77 | 94–99 | 86–71 | — |

Source: ULEB Cup
Legend: Blue = home team win; Red = away team win.

== Elimination rounds ==
In the elimination rounds, teams played against each other over two legs on a home-and-away basis, with the overall cumulative score determining the winner of a round. Thus, the score of one single game can be tied.

In the draw for the elimination rounds, the four group winners and four group runners-up were seeded, and the four group third-placed teams and four group fourth-placed teams were unseeded. The seeded teams were drawn against the unseeded teams, with the seeded teams hosting the second leg. Teams from the same group or the same country could not be drawn against each other.

=== Bracket ===
Eighthfinals; February 4 – February 11
(Belgium) Spirou | 64 | 57 | 121
(Spain) DKV Joventut | 56 | 73 | 129
(Italy) Generali Trieste | 73 | 86 | 159
(Serbia and Montenegro) FMP | 91 | 81 | 172
(Russia) Ural Great | 84 | 69 | 153
(Spain) Caprabo Lleida | 79 | 86 | 165
(Slovenia) Pivovarna Laško | 78 | 69 | 147
(Slovenia) Krka | 79 | 76 | 155
(Germany) RheinEnergie Köln | 72 | 84 | 156
(Spain) Pamesa Valencia | 76 | 93 | 169
(Croatia) Zadar | 94 | 64 | 158
(France) Gravelines | 71 | 78 | 149
(Italy) Eurocellulari Roseto | 80 | 68 | 148
(Spain) Adecco Estudiantes | 72 | 84 | 156
(Italy) Snaidero Udine | 83 | 59 | 142
(Italy) Metis Varese | 77 | 73 | 150

Quarterfinals; February 25 – March 4
(Spain) DKV Joventut | 80 | 68 | 148
(Serbia and Montenegro) FMP | 66 | 77 | 143
(Spain) Caprabo Lleida | 91 | 77 | 168
(Slovenia) Krka | 86 | 94 | 180
(Spain) Pamesa Valencia | 105 | 80 | 185
(Croatia) Zadar | 84 | 93 | 177
(Spain) Adecco Estudiantes | 77 | 101 | 178
(Italy) Metis Varese | 59 | 88 | 147

Semifinals; March 18 – March 25
(Spain) DKV Joventut | 82 | 66 | 148
(Slovenia) Krka | 69 | 82 | 151
(Spain) Pamesa Valencia | 68 | 68 | 136
(Spain) Adecco Estudiantes | 55 | 75 | 130

Finals; April 15 – April 24
(Slovenia) Krka | 78 | 76 | 154
(Spain) Pamesa Valencia | 90 | 78 | 168

Source: ULEB Cup

=== Eighthfinals ===
The first legs were played on 4 February, and the second legs were played on 11 February 2003.

| Team 1 | Agg. | Team 2 | 1st leg | 2nd leg |
|---|---|---|---|---|
| Spirou (Belgium) | 121–129 | (Spain) DKV Joventut | 64–56 | 57–73 |
| Generali Group Trieste (Italy) | 159–172 | (Serbia and Montenegro) FMP | 73–91 | 86–81 |
| Ural Great (Russia) | 153–165 | (Spain) Caprabo Lleida | 84–79 | 69–86 |
| Pivovarna Laško (Slovenia) | 147–155 | (Slovenia) Krka | 78–79 | 69–76 |
| RheinEnergie Köln (Germany) | 156–169 | (Spain) Pamesa Valencia | 72–76 | 84–93 |
| Zadar (Croatia) | 158–149 | (France) Gravelines | 94–71 | 64–78 |
| Eurocellulari Roseto (Italy) | 148–156 | (Spain) Adecco Estudiantes | 80–72 | 68–84 |
| Snaidero Udine (Italy) | 142–150 | (Italy) Metis Varese | 83–77 | 59–73 |

=== Quarterfinals ===
The first legs were played on 25 February, and the second legs were played on 4 March 2003.

| Team 1 | Agg. | Team 2 | 1st leg | 2nd leg |
|---|---|---|---|---|
| DKV Joventut (Spain) | 148–143 | (Serbia and Montenegro) FMP | 80–66 | 68–77 |
| Caprabo Lleida (Spain) | 168–180 | (Slovenia) Krka | 91–86 | 77–94 |
| Pamesa Valencia (Spain) | 185–177 | (Croatia) Zadar | 105–84 | 80–93 |
| Adecco Estudiantes (Spain) | 178–147 | (Italy) Metis Varese | 77–59 | 101–88 |

=== Semifinals ===
The first legs were played on 18 March, and the second legs were played on 25 March 2003.

| Team 1 | Agg. | Team 2 | 1st leg | 2nd leg |
|---|---|---|---|---|
| DKV Joventut (Spain) | 148–151 | (Slovenia) Krka | 82–69 | 66–82 |
| Pamesa Valencia (Spain) | 136–130 | (Spain) Adecco Estudiantes | 68–55 | 68–75 |

=== Finals ===
The first leg was played on 15 April, and the second leg was played on 24 April 2003.

| Team 1 | Agg. | Team 2 | 1st leg | 2nd leg |
|---|---|---|---|---|
| Krka (Slovenia) | 154–168 | (Spain) Pamesa Valencia | 78–90 | 76–78 |

== Awards ==
=== Finals MVP ===
| Player | Team |
|---|---|
| (Serbia and Montenegro) Dejan Tomašević | (Spain) Pamesa Valencia |
