= Roberto Chiacig =

Italian basketball player (born 1974)

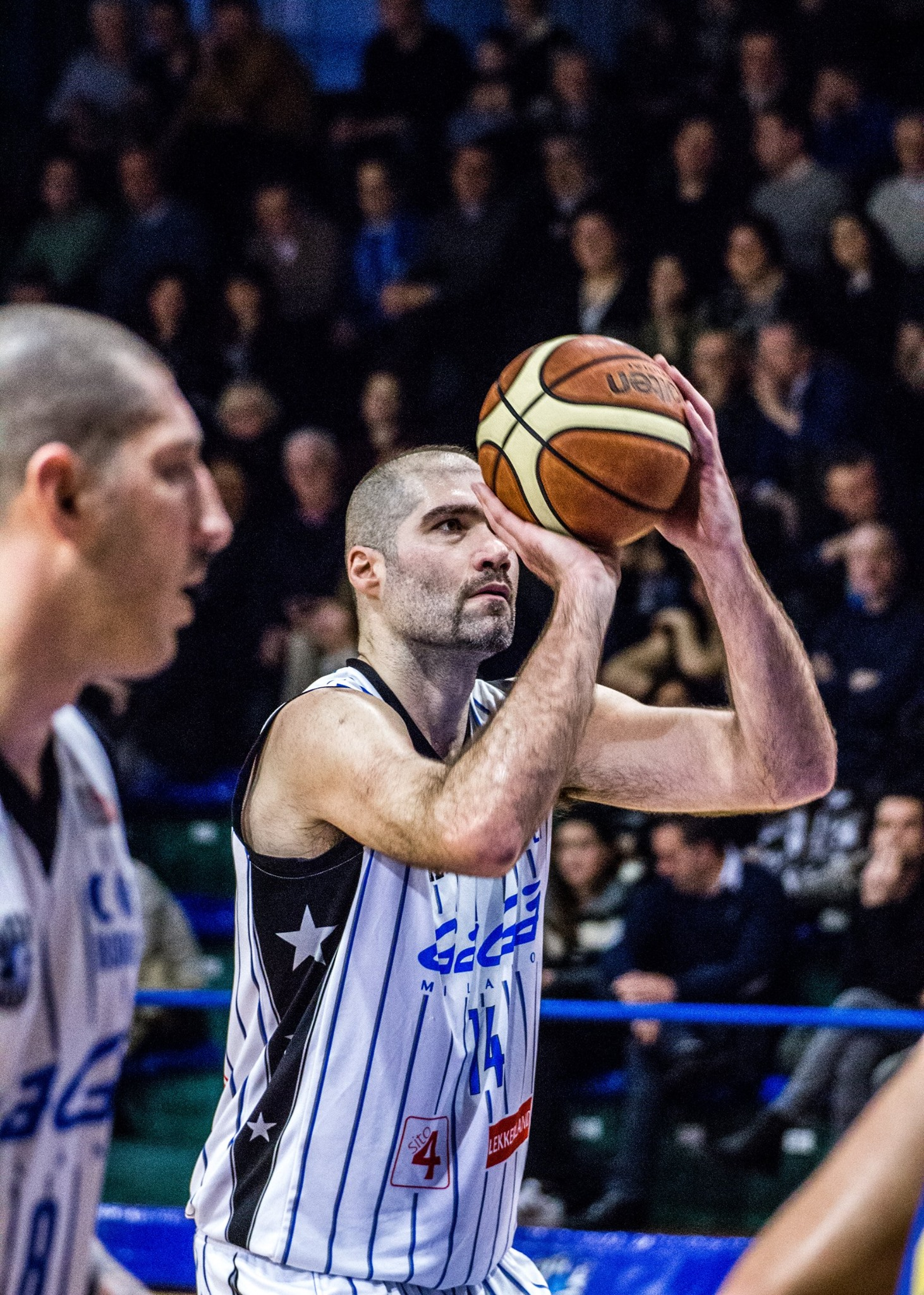

Personal information
- Born: 1 December 1974 (age 51) Cividale del Friuli, Italy
- Listed height: 210 cm (6 ft 11 in)
- Listed weight: 118 kg (260 lb)

Career information
- NBA draft: 1996: undrafted
- Playing career: 1994–present
- Position: Center

Career history
- 1994: Benetton Treviso
- 1994–1995: →Petrarca Padova
- 1995–1996: Benetton Treviso
- 1996–1997: AEK
- 1997–1999: Fortitudo Bologna
- 1999: Reggiana
- 1999–2000: RB Montecatini
- 2000–2006: Mens Sana Siena
- 2006–2007: Valencia
- 2007: Virtus Roma
- 2007–2009: Virtus Bologna
- 2009–2011: Scafati
- 2011–2012: Reggiana
- 2012: Biella
- 2013: Costone Siena
- 2013: Fortitudo Agrigento
- 2013–2014: Scafati
- 2014–2015: Mens Sana Siena
- 2015: Virtus Cassino
- 2015–2016: Orzinuovi
- 2016–2017: Cus Jonico Taranto
- 2017–2018: Libertas Livorno
- 2018–2019: Gilbertina Soresina
- 2020: Mens Sana Siena
- 2022-present: CUS Siena

Career highlights
- FIBA Saporta Cup champion (2002); Italian League champion (2004); Italian Cup winner (1998)
Medals
Men's basketball
Representing Italy
Olympic Games
Silver medal – second place	2004 Athens	Team competition
EuroBasket
Gold medal – first place	1999 France	Team competition
Bronze medal – third place	2003 Sweden	Team competition

Roberto Chiacig (born 1 December 1974 in Cividale del Friuli, Italy) is an Italian former professional basketball player, still playing at an amateur level.

Playing as a center, his most notable achievement was the silver medal obtained by the Italian national team, of which he was a member, at the 2004 Summer Olympics. According to many experts, Roberto Chiacig is one of Europe's best centers of all time.

Beyond playing internationally, he also has had a long club career in Italy, and abroad, winning an Italian League championship title with Montepaschi Siena.

== Professional career ==
Chiacig grew up in the youth ranks of Benetton Treviso, making his debut for the side in a first division Serie A game on 6 February 1994, playing 4 minutes.

After a one-year loan to Serie A2 side Floor Padova, he broke into the first team.

The Italian moved abroad in 1996, spending one year with Greek Basket League side AEK Athens.

Returning to Italy in 1997, he signed with Teamsystem Bologna. With the Bologna team, he would win the Italian Cup and Italian Supercup in 1998. He stayed there until early 1999, finishing the season with Zucchetti Reggio Emilia.

Chiacig then spent the 1999-2000 season with Zucchetti Montecatini.

Joining Montepaschi Siena in 2000, he spent 6 seasons with the club, winning the 2001–02 FIBA Saporta Cup, the 2003–04 Lega Basket Serie A and another Italian Supercup in 2004.

He then moved to the Spanish Liga ACB in 2006, with Pamesa Valencia. However, he only stayed until February 2007, finishing the season with Pallacanestro Virtus Roma.

In 2007, he joined La Fortezza Bologna, rivals of former club Fortitudo. He stayed there for two years, winning the 2008–09 FIBA EuroChallenge.

Chiacig then moved to Scafati Basket in 2009, also staying there two years.

After another season at Pallacanestro Reggiana, he joined Angelico Biella in September 2012.

He was released after around three months, joining amateur side Costone Siena in January 2013.

Chiacig only stayed a month with Costone, signing with Fortitudo Agrigento in February.

The next year he had another stint with Scafati Basket.

In 2014 Chiacig returned to the club where he had the most success, Mens Sana 1871 Siena (formerly Montepaschi), by now in the third division Serie B Basket.

== International career ==
Making his international debut with Italy in 1994, Chiacig participated in the 1997 Summer Universiade.

With the senior Italian national basketball team, he took part in a succession of international tournaments, starting with the 1998 FIBA World Championship.

He posted 6.6 points and 3.1 rebounds, in nearly 18 minutes per game, as Italy won the gold medal at the EuroBasket 1999.

In the EuroBasket 2003, he had 22.1 points and 14.3 rebounds, in around 18, minutes as Italy took home the bronze.

While playing in the 2004 Summer Olympics, his second Summer Olympics participation after the 2000 Summer Olympics, he contributed 16.1 points and 5.1 rebounds per game, to Italy's run to the final, earning a silver medal in the process.

Chiacig's last games with the national team came during the EuroBasket 2005.

== Honours and accomplishments ==
=== Individual ===
- Premio Reverberi (Oscar del basket): Best Male Italian Player (2002)

==== Orders ====
- Order of Merit of the Italian Republic 2nd Class / Grand Officer ("Grande Ufficiale"): conferred on 27 September 2004 by President Carlo Azeglio Ciampi.

=== Team ===
==== Clubs ====
- Italian LBA League Champion: (2004)
- FIBA Saporta Cup Champion: (2002)
- Italian Cup Winner: (1998)
- FIBA EuroChallenge Champion: (2009)
- Italian SuperCup Winner: (1998, 2004)

==== Italian senior national team ====
- 2004 Athens Summer Olympics: Silver
- EuroBasket 1999 France: Gold
- EuroBasket 2003 Sweden: Bronze
