= 1984 FIBA Intercontinental Cup =

- League: FIBA Intercontinental Cup
- Sport: Basketball
- Finals champions: (Italy) Banco Roma
- Runners-up: (Argentina) Obras Sanitarias

FIBA Intercontinental Cup seasons
- ← 1983 FIBA Intercontinental Cup 1985 FIBA Club World Cup →

The 1984 FIBA Intercontinental Cup William Jones was the 18th edition of the FIBA Intercontinental Cup for men's basketball clubs and the 17th edition of the tournament in the form of a true intercontinental cup. It took place at Ginásio do Ibirapuera, São Paulo. From the FIBA European Champions Cup (EuroLeague) participated Banco Roma and FC Barcelona, from the South American Club Championship, participated Sírio and Obras Sanitarias, and from the NABL, participated the Lexington Marathon Oil.

== Participants ==
Continent	Teams	Clubs	
Europe	2	(Italy) Banco Roma	(Spain) FC Barcelona
South America	2	(Brazil) Sírio	(Argentina) Obras Sanitarias
North America	1	(United States) Lexington Marathon Oil	

== League stage ==
Day 1, September 19, 1984

Team 1	Score	Team 2
Sírio (Brazil)	114–90	(United States) Lexington Marathon Oil
FC Barcelona (Spain)	91–110	(Argentina) Obras Sanitarias

Day 2, September 20, 1984

Team 1	Score	Team 2
Lexington Marathon Oil (United States)	88–97	(Argentina) Obras Sanitarias
Sírio (Brazil)	88–100	(Italy) Banco Roma

Day 3, September 21, 1984

Team 1	Score	Team 2
Banco Roma (Italy)	73–71	(Argentina) Obras Sanitarias
Lexington Marathon Oil (United States)	99–108	(Spain) FC Barcelona

Day 4, September 22, 1984

Team 1	Score	Team 2
FC Barcelona (Spain)	85–86	(Italy) Banco Roma
Sírio (Brazil)	82–76	(Argentina) Obras Sanitarias

Day 5, September 23, 1984

Team 1	Score	Team 2
Sírio (Brazil)	90–93	(Spain) FC Barcelona
Lexington Marathon Oil (United States)	112–92	(Italy) Banco Roma

== Final standings ==
	Team	Pld	Pts	W	L	PF	PA
1.	(Italy) Banco Roma	4	7	3	1	351	356
2.	(Argentina) Obras Sanitarias	4	6	2	2	354	334
3.	(Brazil) Sírio	4	6	2	2	374	359
4.	(Spain) FC Barcelona	4	6	2	2	377	385
5.	(United States) Lexington Marathon Oil	4	5	1	3	389	411

1984 Intercontinental Champions

Banco Roma
1st title
