= Virtus Roma =

Virtus Roma 1960
- Leagues: Serie B
- Founded: 1960; 2021 (refoundation)
- History: Virtus Aurelia (1960–1972); Pallacanestro Virtus Roma (1972–2020); Virtus Roma 1960 (2021–present)
- Arena: PalaLottomatica
- Capacity: 11,200
- Location: Rome, Lazio, Italy
- Team colors: Red, Yellow, Blue
- President: Maurizio Zoffoli
- Head coach: Alessandro Tonolli
- Championships: 1 FIBA Intercontinental Cup; 1 EuroLeague; 2 FIBA Korać Cups; 1 Italian League; 1 Italian Supercup
- Website: virtusroma1960.it
Home	Away	Third

Virtus Roma 1960, commonly known as Virtus Roma, is an Italian professional basketball club based in Rome, Lazio. The club named Pallacanestro Virtus Roma competed in the first division of Italian basketball, the LBA, for decades until 2020, when it went bankrupt. In 2021 the club was refounded.

It was formerly a major side in Europe, winning the 1983–84 FIBA European Champions Cup (EuroLeague), and at one time being one of only 13 clubs to hold a EuroLeague A license. However, its standing later waned, and Virtus became less competitive in both Europe and the domestic LBA - which it had won in 1983 – before being voluntarily relegated to the Italian second division in July 2015.

In December 2020, Virtus was dissolved after the club was declared bankrupt after months of financial struggles.

For past club sponsorship names, see sponsorship names.

== History ==
The club was formed by the merger of two Roman sides, San Saba and Gruppo Borgo Cavalleggeri, under the name Virtus Aurelia in the late 1960s, the founding date of San Saba, 1960, was kept as Virtus'. In 1972, Virtus Aurelia merged with GS Banco di Roma, the sporting wing of Banco di Roma, forming Pallacanestro Banco di Roma Virtus or simply Banco di Roma. The side reached the Italian second division in 1978, staying two years before moving up to the Italian top level LBA, in 1980.

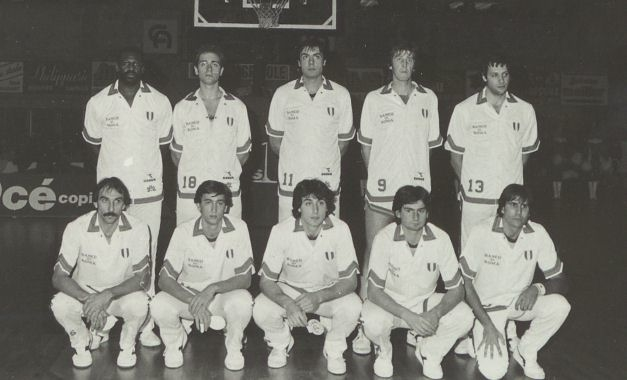
Banco di Roma before the kick-off of the European Champions Cup match against Limoges CSP in 1983.

This was the start of an extended stay in the first division, and success followed soon after, with the side winning the 1983 championship. Earning a place in the 1983–84 FIBA European Champions Cup (EuroLeague), Virtus went on to win the competition at its first try, with a Larry Wright led squad, that also had Clarence Kea, Renzo Tombolato, and Fulvio Polesello. Wright was decisive in the EuroLeague Final against FC Barcelona, scoring 27 points, as Roma overturned a 10-point halftime deficit to win the decider. The next season, the Italian club won the 1984 FIBA Intercontinental Cup, after topping a group of international clubs in Brazil. Roma also won the 1985–86 FIBA Korać Cup final against Mobilgirgi Caserta.

The club's next title was the 1991–92 FIBA Korać Cup, by which time Banco di Roma had been replaced as the club's sponsor by Il Messaggero. A squad comprising Dino Rađa, Rick Mahorn, Roberto Premier, and Andrea Niccolai downed Scavolini Pesaro in the two-legged final. The next year, Virtus managed to reach the FIBA Korać Cup final again, but lost the game against Philips Milano. During the 2002–03 season, Carlton Myers led the team to a 25–9 record in the Serie A (LBA), as Roma reached the playoff's semifinals. After adding Dejan Bodiroga as a player, and head coach Svetislav Pešić, in the 2005 off-season, Virtus reached the ULEB Cup (EuroCup) quarterfinals, the Serie A semifinals, and the Italian Cup final, that it lost in overtime.

In the summer of 2011, the Italian club's EuroLeague A-license was suspended, after it finished in the bottom half of the Serie A. The next year, it lost the license completely, after having the worst record among A license clubs. It lost its license to EA7 Emporio Armani Milano.

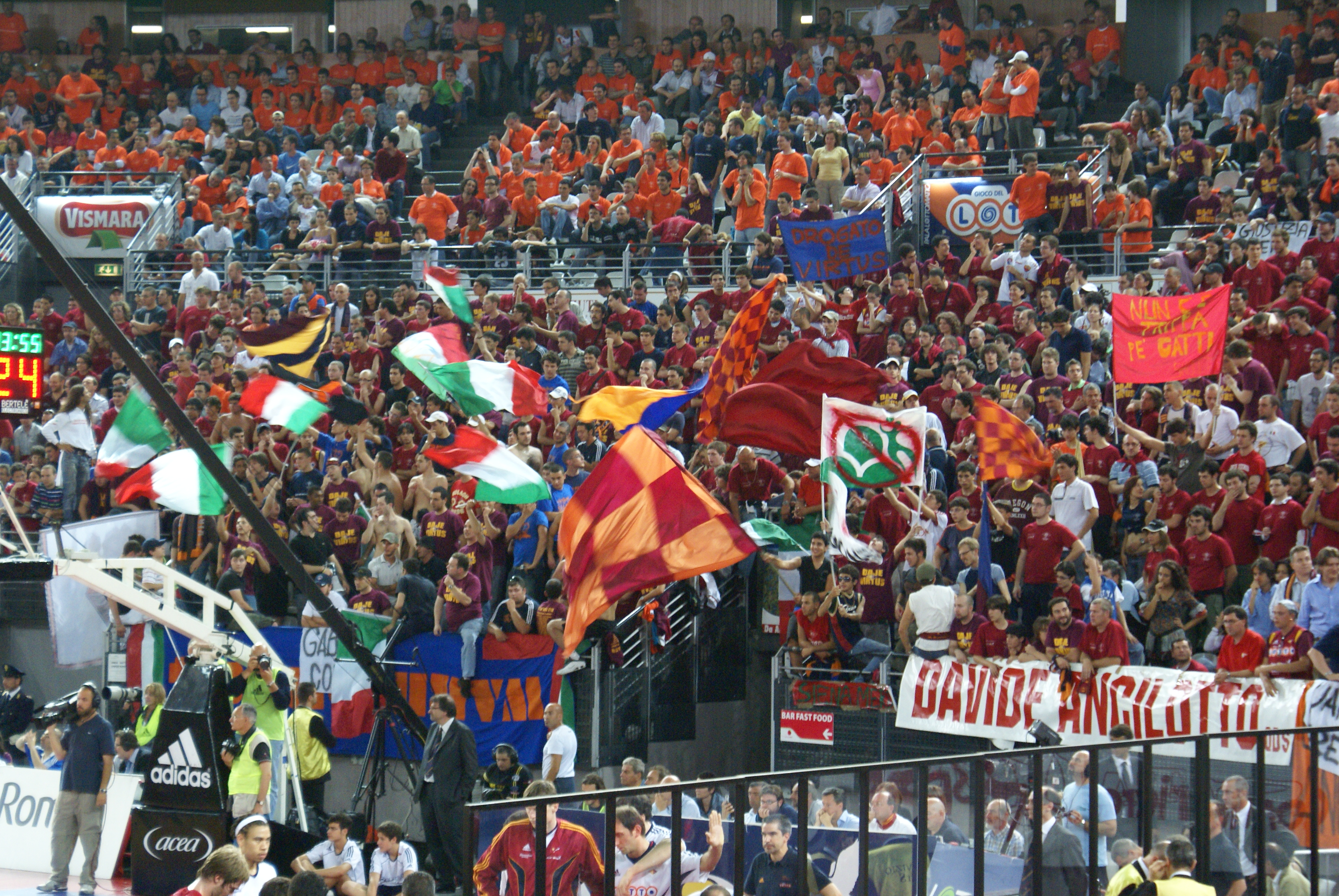
Virtus Roma supporters in 2008

In a strange twist, Virtus Roma then went on to have an excellent season, unexpectedly, by their own admission, reaching the Serie A finals, which would earn it the right to return to the EuroLeague. However, the club relinquished their rights, as they did not agree to some of the competition's requirements. In particular, paying rent for an arena with the minimum arena capacity. They thus earned a place in the second tier EuroCup instead.

In July 2015, despite having satisfied the economic conditions to participate in the Italian top level LBA, the club's management asked to participate instead in the Italian second division Serie A2. The permission to do so was granted by the Italian Basketball Federation. The cited motive for the move to the lower division, was an insufficient budget to be competitive at the higher level, and the desire to restructure the club based on a youth policy.

On April 23, 2019, after beating Legnano Knights by 83–88, Virtus Roma is proclaimed champion of the Serie A2, getting the direct promotion to the Serie A. Virtu returns to the highest tier after an absence of four years.

=== Dissolution ===
On December 9, 2020, the club withdrew from the Serie A due to financial difficulties and the inability to find a new investor.

== Arenas ==
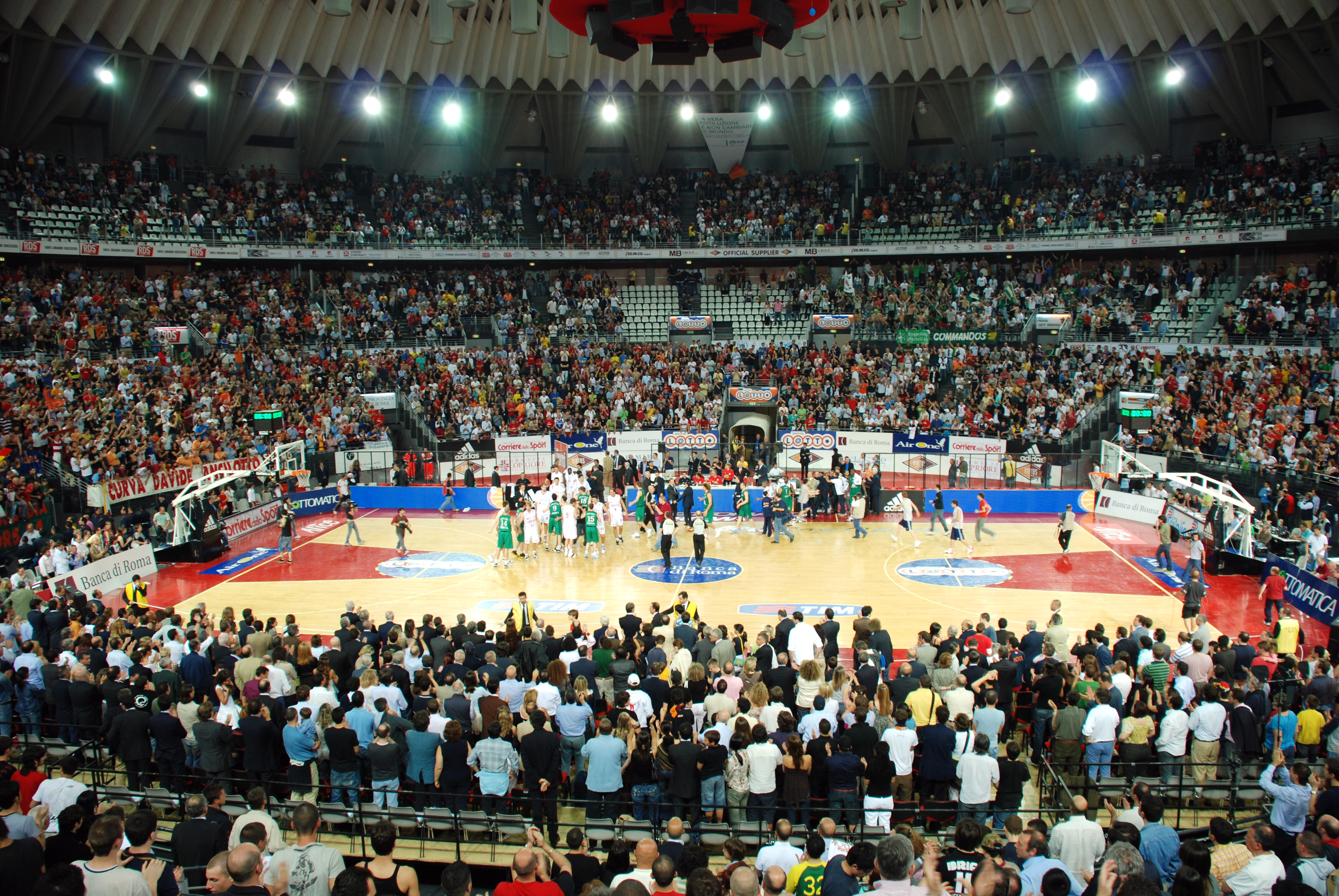
Fans of Roma at PalaLottomatica, in 2006.

- Palazzetto dello Sport (seating capacity: 3,500): (1960–1983, 2000–2003, 2011–2018)
- PalaLottomatica: (seating capacity: 11,200): (1983–1999, 2003–2011, 2018–2020)

Virtus played at the 3,500 seating capacity Palazzetto dello Sport arena, until 1983. The club then played at the 11,200 seat PalaLottomatica arena, from 1983 to 2011, except between 2000 and 2003, when the arena was undergoing extensive renovation work.

After the club down scaled its operations costs, due to reduced funds, Virtus found the operating costs of the PalaLottomatica to be prohibitive, and decided to avoid playing in the larger arena. So from 2011 to 2018, it returned to the Palazzetto dello Sport, even playing games there during the 2013 Italian LBA Finals.

On June 9, 2018, Virtus Roma reached a new deal with All Events SpA, the operator of PalaLottomatica, to play at the arena during the Serie A2 2018–19 season.

== Honours and other achievements ==
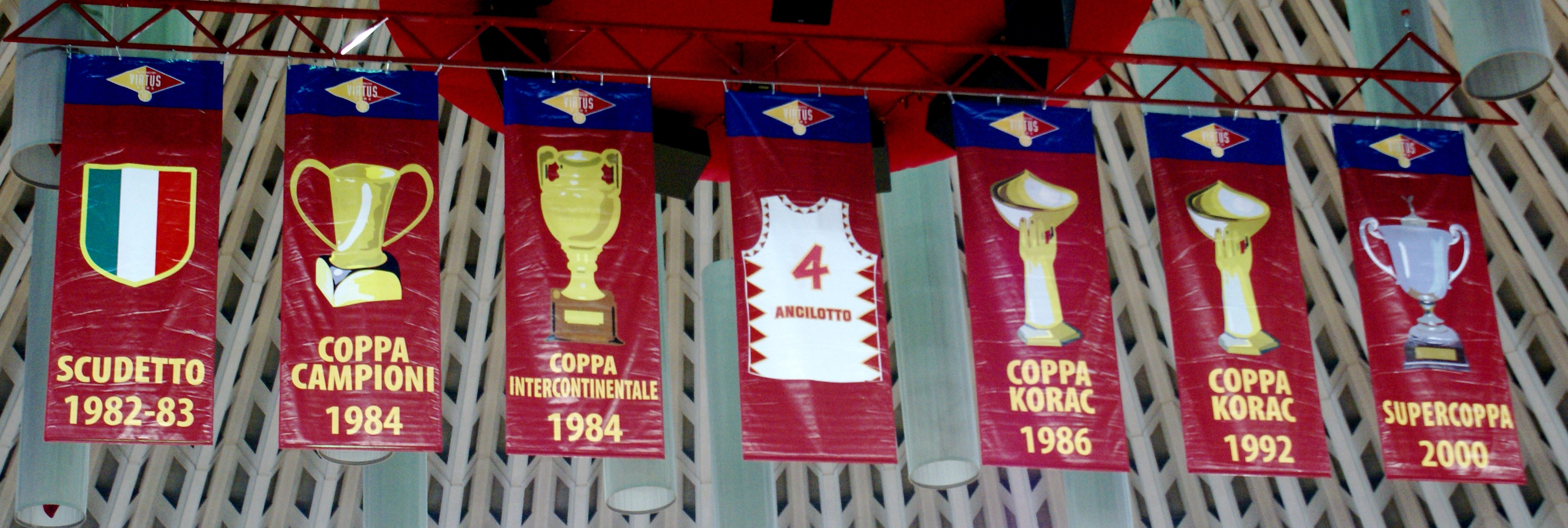
Banners of Virtus Roma

Honours
Type	Competition	Titles	Seasons
International	EuroLeague	1	1983–84
International	FIBA Korać Cup	2	1985–86, 1991–92
International	FIBA Intercontinental Cup	1	1984
Domestic	Italian League	1	1982–83
Domestic	Italian Supercup	1	2000

=== Other Achievements ===
==== International competitions ====
- FIBA Korać Cup (defunct)
  - Runners-up (1): 1992–93
  - Semifinalists (1): 1997–98
- European Club Super Cup (semi-official, defunct)
  - Runners-up (1): 1983

==== Domestic competitions ====
- Italian League
  - Runners-up (2): 2007–08, 2012–13
- Italian Cup
  - Runners-up (2): 1989–90, 2005–06

==== Other competitions ====
- Trofeo Ambrose

Winners (1): 2009

== The road to the European victories ==
1983–84 FIBA European Champions Cup

Round	Team	Home	Away
1st	(Luxembourg) T71 Dudelange	85–44	72–40
2nd	(Albania) Partizani Tirana	93–55	78–69
SF	(France) Limoges CSP	81–76	76–74
SF	(Spain) FC Barcelona	74–71	74–81
SF	(Italy) Jollycolombani Cantù	85–86	79–71
SF	(Israel) Maccabi Tel Aviv	82–67	91–85
SF	(Socialist Federal Republic of Yugoslavia) Bosna	65–55	77–86
F	(Spain) FC Barcelona	79–73	

1985–86 FIBA Korać Cup

Round	Team	Home	Away
2nd	Bye		
Top 16	(Israel) Hapoel Tel Aviv	93–74	82–92
Top 16	(Socialist Federal Republic of Yugoslavia) Bosna	91–77	96–100
Top 16	(France) Challans	107–80	78–77
SF	(France) Olympique Antibes	83–75	78–69
F	(Italy) Mobilgirgi Caserta	73–72	84–78

1991–92 FIBA Korać Cup

Round	Team	Home	Away
1st	(Belgium) Go Pass Verviers-Pepinster	104–90	99–89
2nd	(France) Reims	94–71	72–54
Top 16	(Spain) CAI Zaragoza	97–72	81–77
Top 16	(Greece) Panathinaikos	84–75	99–96
Top 16	(France) Pitch Cholet	95–88	69–83
QF	Racing Club de France	80–72	71–70
SF	(Spain) Fórum Filatélico Valladolid	76–70	66–67
F	(Italy) Scavolini Pesaro	94–94	99–86

== Season by season record ==
The following table shows the records from the season 1977–78 in all competitions:

Season	Tier	League	Pos.	Postseason	Italian Cup	Supercup	Europe		Worldwide	
1977–78	3	Serie B	4	Promoted	–	–	–	–	–	–
1978–79	2	Serie A2	5	–	–	–	–	–	–	–
1979–80	2	Serie A2	3	Promoted	–	–	–	–	–	–
1980–81	1	Serie A	10	–	–	–	–	–	–	–
1981–82	1	Serie A	10	–	–	–	–	–	–	–
1982–83	1	Serie A	1	Champions	–	–	Korać Cup	Top 16	–	–
1983–84	1	Serie A	9	–	Quarterfinalist	–	Euroleague	Champions	–	–
1984–85	1	Serie A	1	Quarterfinalist	Quarterfinalist	–	Euroleague	Top 6	Intercontinental Cup	Champions
1985–86	1	Serie A	10	Quarterfinalist	Quarterfinalist	–	Korać Cup	Champions	Intercontinental Cup	8
1986–87	1	Serie A	8	Top 12	Top 32	–	–	–	–	–
1987–88	1	Serie A	10	Quarterfinalist	Quarterfinalist	–	–	–	–	–
1988–89	1	Serie A	12	–	Top 32	–	–	–	–	–
1989–90	1	Serie A	8	Quarterfinalist	Finalist	–	–	–	–	–
1990–91	1	Serie A	4	Semifinalist	Top 16	–	–	–	–	–
1991–92	1	Serie A	6	Semifinalist	Quarterfinalist	–	Korać Cup	Champions	–	–
1992–93	1	Serie A	12	–	Top 16	–	Korać Cup	Finalist	–	–
1993–94	1	Serie A	15	–	Top 32	–	–	–	–	–
1994–95	1	Serie A	8	Quarterfinalist	Quarterfinalist	–	–	–	–	–
1995–96	1	Serie A	6	Quarterfinalist	Quarterfinalist	–	–	–	–	–
1996–97	1	Serie A	6	Quarterfinalist	Quarterfinalist	–	Korać Cup	Quarterfinalist	–	–
1997–98	1	Serie A	8	Quarterfinalist	Quarterfinalist	–	Korać Cup	Semifinalist	–	–
1998–99	1	Serie A	6	Quarterfinalist	Quarterfinalist	–	Korać Cup	Top 16	–	–
1999–00	1	Serie A	6	Top 14	Quarterfinalist	–	Korać Cup	Quarterfinalist	–	–
2000–01	1	Serie A	5	Quarterfinalist	Semifinalist	Champions	–	–	–	–
2001–02	1	Serie A	8	Quarterfinalist	–	–	–	–	–	–
2002–03	1	Serie A	2	Semifinalist	Quarterfinalist	–	–	–	–	–
2003–04	1	Serie A	7	Quarterfinalist	Quarterfinalist	–	Euroleague	Regular season	–	–
2004–05	1	Serie A	6	Semifinalist	Semifinalist	–	–	–	–	–
2005–06	1	Serie A	6	Semifinalist	Quarterfinalist	–	Eurocup	Quarterfinalist	–	–
2006–07	1	Serie A	4	Semifinalist	Quarterfinalist	–	Euroleague	Top 16	–	–
2007–08	1	Serie A	2	Finalist	Quarterfinalist	–	Euroleague	Top 16	–	–
2008–09	1	Serie A	2	Quarterfinalist	Quarterfinalist	–	Euroleague	Top 16	–	–
2009–10	1	Serie A	7	Semifinalist	–	–	Euroleague	Regular season	–	–
2010–11	1	Serie A	9	–	–	–	Euroleague	Top 16	–	–
2011–12	1	Serie A	13	–	–	–	–	–	–	–
2012–13	1	Serie A	3	Finalist	Semifinalist	–	–	–	–	–
2013–14	1	Serie A	6	Semifinalist	Quarterfinalist	–	Eurocup	Regular season	–	–
2014–15	1	Serie A	10	Demoted	–	–	Eurocup	Top 16	–	–
2015–16	2	Serie A2	–	–	–	–	–	–	–	–

== Notable players ==
Note: Flags indicate national team eligibility at FIBA-sanctioned events. Players may hold other non-FIBA nationalities not displayed.

Criteria

To appear in this section a player must have either:

- Set a club record or won an individual award while at the club
- Played at least one official international match for their national team at any time
- Played at least one official NBA match at any time.

=== 2010s ===
- (Bosnia and Herzegovina) Nemanja Gordić 2 seasons: '10–'12
- (Montenegro) Vladimir Dašić 4 seasons: '10–'12'
- (Italy) Lorenzo D'Ercole
- (Belgium) Maxime De Zeeuw
- (Nigeria) Ndudi Ebi
- (United States) Austin Freeman
- (Canada) Melvin Ejim
- (Croatia) Rok Stipčević
- (United States) Kyle Gibson

=== 2000s ===
- (Italy) Luigi Datome 5 season: '08–'13
- (Slovenia) Sani Bečirović 1 season: '08–'09
- (Slovenia) Primož Brezec 1 season: '08–'09
- (United States) Brandon Jennings 1 season: '08–'09
- (United States) Allan Ray 2 seasons: '07–'09
- (Argentina) Roberto Gabini 3 seasons: '07–'09
- (United States) Erik Daniels 1 season: '07–'08
- (Italy) Gregor Fučka 1 season: '07–'08
- (Croatia) Roko Leni Ukić 1 season: '07–'08
- (Iceland) Jón Stefánsson 2 seasons: '06–'08
- (Slovenia) Erazem Lorbek 2 seasons: '06–'08
- (Serbia) Ognjen Aškrabić 1 season: '06–'07
- (United States) Mire Chatman 1 season: '06–'07
- (Italy) Roberto Chiacig 1 season: '06–'07
- (United States) David Hawkins 4 seasons: '05–'08
- (Serbia) Dejan Bodiroga 2 seasons: '05–'07
- (North Macedonia) Vlado Ilievski 2 seasons: '05–'07
- (Nigeria) Obinna Ekezie 1 season: '05–'06
- (Belgium) Thomas Van Den Spiegel 2 seasons: '04–'06
- (United States) Tyus Edney 1 season: '04–'05
- (Italy) Vincenzo Esposito 1/2 season: '04
- (Czech Republic) Luboš Bartoň 2 seasons: '03–'05
- (United States) Cory Alexander 1 season: '03–'04
- (United States) Keith McLeod 1 season: '03–'04
- (Slovenia) Marko Tušek 4 seasons: '02–'06'
- (Italy) Davide Bonora 3 seasons: '02–'05
- (United States) Horace Jenkins 1 season: '02–'03
- (Puerto Rico) Daniel Santiago 1 season: '02–'03
- (United States) Anthony Parker 1 season: '02–'03
- (Italy) Carlton Myers 3 seasons: '01–'04
- (Italy) Alex Righetti 7 seasons: '00–'07
- (United States) Ben Handlogten 1 season: '01–'02
- (United States) Jerome Allen 2 seasons: '00–'02
- (United States) Rod Sellers 1 season: '00–'01
- (Argentina) Juan Espil 1 season: '00–'01

=== 1990s ===
- (United States) Mike Iuzzolino 1 season: '99–'00
- (United States) Henry Williams 1 season: '99–'00
- (United States) Warren Kidd 2 seasons: '98–'00
- (Italy) Mario Boni 2 seasons: '97–'99
- (Serbia) Saša Obradović 2 seasons: '97–'99
- (United States) Bill Edwards 1 season: '97–'98
- (Italy) Walter Magnifico 1 season: '97–'98
- (United States) Ed Stokes 1 season: '96–'97
- (Italy) Davide Ancilotto 1 season: '96–'97
- (United States) Steve Henson 2 seasons: '95–'97
- (Argentina) Hugo Sconochini 3 seasons: '95–'96, '04–'06
- (United States) Tod Murphy 1 season: '95–'96
- (United States) Jeff Sanders 1 season: '94–'95
- (United States) Tanoka Beard 1 season: '93–'94
- (United States) Shelton Jones 1 season: '93–'94
- (Italy) Sandro Dell'Agnello 2 seasons: '92–'94
- (United States) Rick Mahorn 2 seasons: '91–'93
- (Croatia) Dino Rađa 3 seasons: '90–'93
- (United States) Michael Cooper 1 season: '90–'91

=== 1980s ===
- (Italy) Roberto Premier 5 seasons: '89–'94
- (Italy) Fausto Bargna 1 season: '89–'90
- (United States) Danny Ferry 1 season: '89–'90
- (United States) Brian Shaw 1 season: '89–'90
- (Dominican Republic) Josè Vargas 1 season: '88–'89
- (Italy) Emiliano Busca 10 seasons: '87–'90, '92–'99
- (Italy) Carlo Della Valle 2 seasons: '87–'89
- (Italy) Tiziano Lorenzon 5 seasons: '86–'91
- (United States) Mike Bantom 3 seasons: '86–'89
- (United States) George Gervin 1 season: '86–'87
- (United States) Jim Rowinski 2 seasons: circa '85–'88
- (Canada) Leo Rautins 1 season: '85–'86
- (Italy) Marco Solfrini 4 seasons: '82–'86
- (United States) Larry Wright 3 seasons: '82–'84, '87–'88
- (United States) Clarence Kea 2 seasons: '82–'84
- (Italy) Stefano Sbarra 6 seasons: '81–'87
- (Italy) Fulvio Polesello 8 seasons: '80–'88
- (United States) Ray Townsend 1 season: '84–'85

=== 1970s ===
- (Italy) Enrico Gilardi 8 seasons: '79–'87, '88–'90
- (Italy) Roberto Castellano 6 seasons: '78–'83, '89–'90

== Head coaches ==
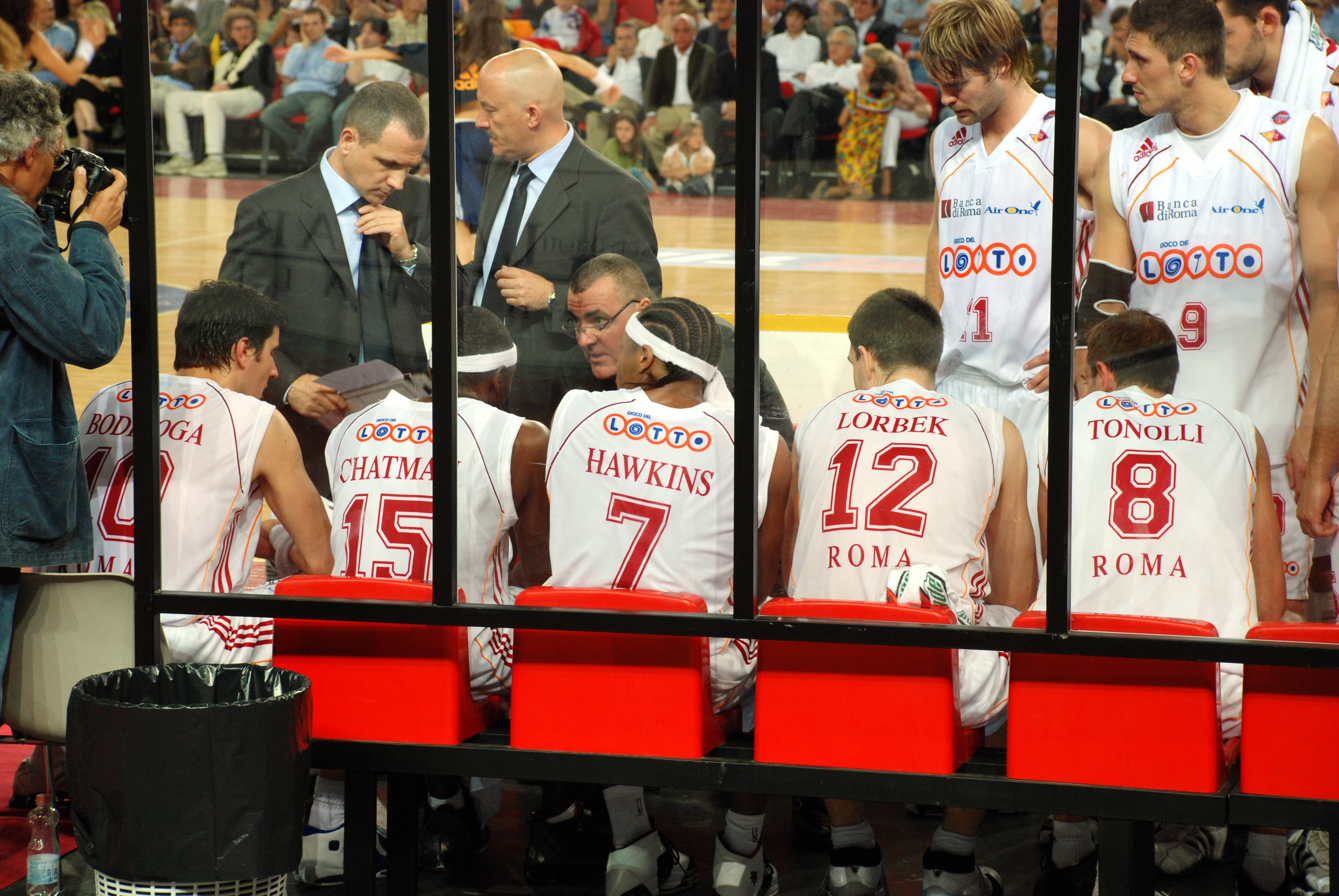
Coach Jasmin Repeša and his players during a timeout during the 2005–06 season.

- Maurizio Polidori – 1972–73
- Francesco Della Penna – 1973–74
- Alessandro Lisotti – 1974–76
- Nello Paratore – 1976–81
- Giancarlo Asteo – 1981–82
- Paolo Di Fonzo – 1982
- Valerio Bianchini – 1982–85
- Mario De Sisti – 1985–86
- Giuseppe Guerrieri – 1986–88
- Giancarlo Primo – 1988–89
- Petar Skansi – 1989
- Valerio Bianchini – 1989–91
- Paolo Di Fonzo – 1991–92
- Franco Casalini – 1992–94
- Nevio Ciaralli – 1994
- Attilio Caja – 1994–99
- Valerio Bianchini – 1999
- Marco Calvani – 1999
- Cesare Pancotto – 1999–00
- Marco Calvani – 2000
- Attilio Caja – 2000–02
- Piero Bucchi – 2002–05
- Svetislav Pešić – 2005–06
- Jasmin Repeša – 2006–08
- Nando Gentile – 2008–09
- Matteo Boniciolli – 2009–11
- Sašo Filipovski – 2011
- Lino Lardo - 2011-12
- Marco Calvani - 2012-13
- Luca Dalmonte - 2013–present

== Sponsorship names ==
Throughout the years, due to sponsorship, the club has been known as:

- Virtus Aurelia (no sponsorship, 1960–61 until 1971–72)
- Banco di Roma (1972–73 until 1987–88)
- Phonola Roma (1988–89)
- Il Messaggero Roma (1989–90 until 1991–92)
- Virtus Roma (no sponsorship, 1992–93)
- Burghy Roma (1993–94)
- Teorematour Roma (1994–95)
- Nuova Tirrena Roma (1995–96)
- Telemarket Roma (1996–97)
- Calze Pompea Roma (1997–98 until 1998–99)
- Aeroporti di Roma Virtus (1999–00 until 2000–01)
- Würth Roma (2001–02)
- Lottomatica Roma (2002–03 until 2010–11)
- Acea Roma (2011–12 until 2015–16)
- UniCusano Roma (2016–17 until 2017–18)
- Virtus Roma (no sponsorship, 2018–19 to 2020–21)
