= Pallacanestro Messina =

Italian professional basketball team

Pallacanestro Messina was an Italian professional basketball team based in Messina, Sicily.

== History ==
Established in 1976, the club was admitted to the first division Serie A for the 2003-04 season after Virtus Bologna was excluded for financial irregularities. Messina struggled on every front during that season, finishing dead last in the league whilst suffering from financial problems and a lack of interest from the public. With debts too big to allow the club to even take part in other divisions and scaring off clubs that wanted to buy the side's sporting rights, Messina went bankrupt a few months after the season.

== Notable players ==
- (Italy) Agostino Li Vecchi 3 seasons: '99-'00, '02-'04
- (United States) Gerrod Abram 2 seasons: '99-'01
- (United States) Marques Bragg 2 seasons: '99-'00, '02-'03
- (United States) Charles Smith 1/2 season: '00
- (United States) Malcolm Mackey 1 season: '00-'01
- (United States) (Germany) Scooter Barry 1 season: '00-'01
- (Italy) Cristiano Grappasonni 1 season: '00-'01
- (United States) Chris Carrawell 1 season: '00-'01
- (United States) Brian Oliver 2 seasons: '01-'03
- (United States) Lamarr Greer 1 season: '01-'02
- (United States) (Puerto Rico) Sharif Fajardo 1 season: '01-'02
- (Italy) Manuel Vanuzzo 1 season: '01-'02
- (United States) Saddi Washington 1 season: '01-'02
- (United States) Herman Smith 1 season: '02-'03
- (Italy) Leonardo Busca 1 season: '02-'03
- (United States) Matt Bonner 1 season: '03-'04
- (United States) Marlon Garnett 1 season: '03-'04
- (United States) Marquis Estill 1 season: '03-'04
- (Italy) Leonardo Busca 1 season: '03-'04
- (United States) Vincent Yarbrough 1 season: '03-'04

== Sponsorship names ==
Throughout the years, due to sponsorship, the club has been known as:

- Ina Sicilia Barcellona (1999-2000)
- Media Broker Messina (2000-2001)
- Sicilia Messina (2003-2004)
