= Bennett Davison =

American basketball player (born 1975)

Personal information
- Born: November 21, 1975 (age 50) San Francisco, California, U.S.
- Listed height: 6 ft 8 in (2.03 m)
- Listed weight: 235 lb (107 kg)

Career information
- High school: Analy (Sebastopol, California)
- College: West Valley (1994–1996); Arizona (1996–1998)
- NBA draft: 1998: undrafted
- Playing career: 1998–2010
- Position: Power forward / center
- Number: 21, 14, 8

Career history
- 1998–1999: Galatasaray
- 1999–2000: Melbourne Tigers
- 2000–2002: Krka
- 2002–2004: Basket Napoli
- 2004–2005: Virtus Bologna
- 2005–2006: Cibona
- 2006–2007: Virtus Bologna
- 2007: Olimpia Milano
- 2007–2008: Rethymno Aegean
- 2008–2009: Scafati
- 2009–2010: Huracanes de Tampico
- 2010: Toros de Aragua
- 2010: Gold Coast Blaze
- 2010: Huellos del Siglo

Career highlights
- All-NBL Third Team (2000); NCAA champion (1997)

Bennett Davison (born November 21, 1975) is an American former basketball player who played professionally for over ten years, including several seasons in Italy's Lega Basket Serie A. Davison is also known for his success as a college player, where he was a starter on the University of Arizona's 1997 NCAA championship team.

== Early life and college career ==
Davison was born in San Francisco and raised in Sebastopol, California. He was lightly recruited after his high school career at Analy High School and landed at West Valley College, a community college. After two strong seasons, Davison attracted the attention of coach Lute Olson at Arizona, and was offered a scholarship with the Wildcats.

In his first season at Arizona, Davison started at power forward as the young Wildcats entered the 1997 NCAA Tournament as a #4 seed with a 19–9 record. They swept through the field to win the national championship, becoming the first team to beat three top seeds (Kansas, North Carolina and Kentucky) in the process. In Davison's senior season, the team returned all five starters and was ranked #1 in the preseason, but was upset in the regional final by Utah. For his Arizona career, Davison averaged 8.6 points and 6.5 rebounds per game and started 61 of 69 contests in his two seasons.

== Professional career ==
Following the close of his college career, Davison was not selected in the 1998 NBA draft. He instead began an overseas career, taking him to Turkey, Australia, Slovenia, Italy, Greece, Mexico, Venezuela and the Dominican Republic. He played in Lega Basket Serie A, Italy's top league, averaging 9.5 points and 5.8 rebounds in his three-year career there.

Davison tried to make it to the NBA during his professional career. In 1999, he played for the Vancouver Grizzlies in the NBA Summer League. He was featured in the Denver Nuggets' roster at the 2002 Rocky Mountain Revue in Salt Lake City. On October 12, 2002, he signed as free agent with the Los Angeles Clippers and was given a minimum contract. On October 24, 2002, he was waived.
