= Bud Eley =

American basketball player

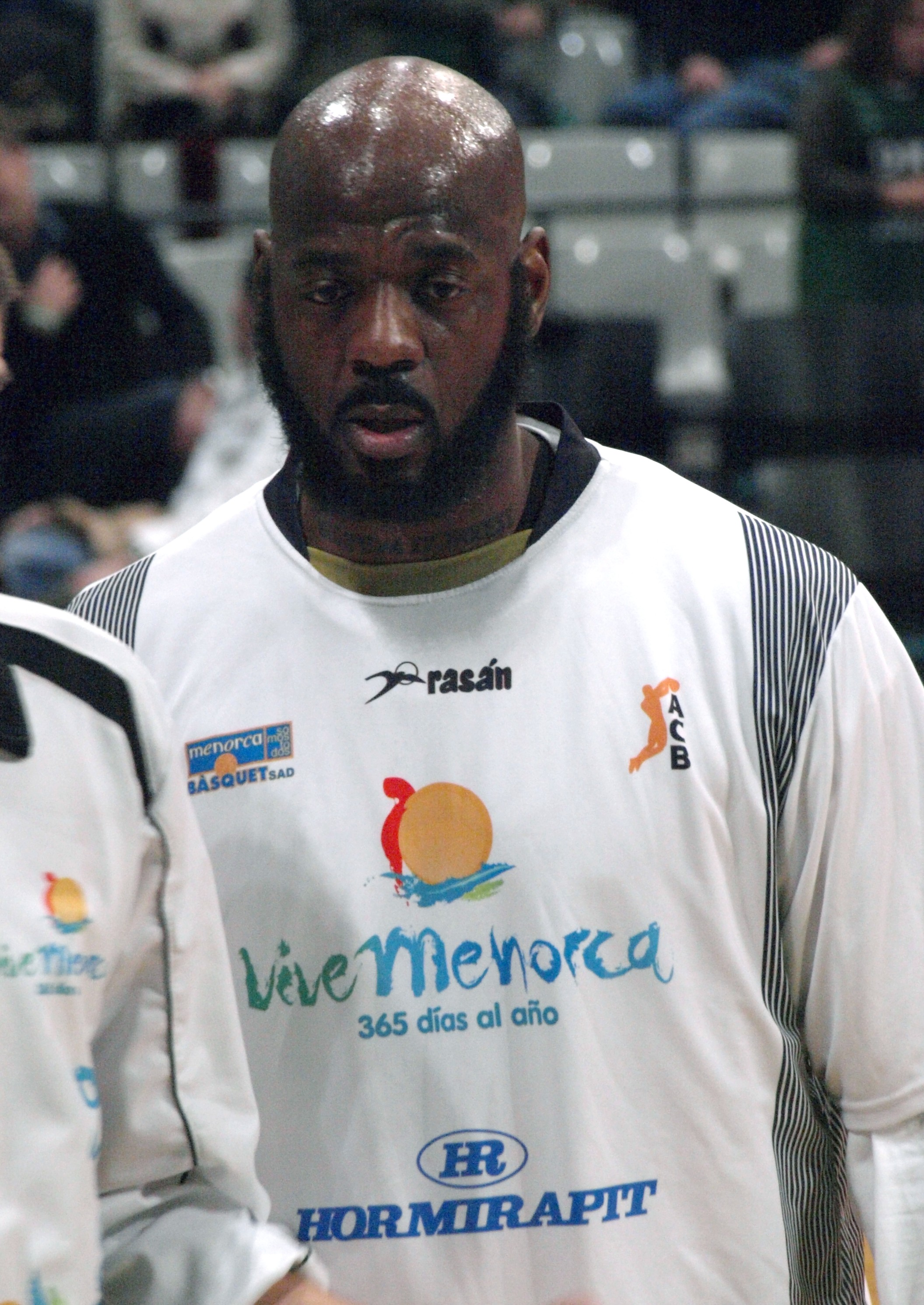
- Eley with Menorca Bàsquet in 2009

Personal information
- Born: January 14, 1975 (age 51) Detroit, Michigan, U.S.
- Listed height: 6 ft 10 in (2.08 m)
- Listed weight: 260 lb (118 kg)

Career information
- High school: Martin Luther King (Detroit, Michigan)
- College: Southeast Missouri State (1995–1999)
- NBA draft: 1999: undrafted
- Playing career: 1999–2009
- Position: Center

Career history
- 1999–2001: Beşiktaş
- 2001–2002: Fenerbahçe
- 2002: Detroit Dogs
- 2002–2003: Auna Gran Canaria
- 2003–2004: Scavolini Pesaro
- 2004–2005: Granada
- 2005–2006: Llanera Menorca
- 2006–2008: Grupo Capitol Valladolid
- 2008–2009: ViveMenorca
- 2009: Mahram Tehran

Career highlights
- TBL scoring champion (2001); OVC Player of the Year (1999); 2× First-team All-OVC (1997, 1999); Second-team All-OVC (1996); OVC Newcomer of the Year (1996); OVC All-Freshman team (1996)

William Keith "Bud" Eley (born January 14, 1975) is an American former professional basketball player. He played college basketball for the Southeast Missouri State Redhawks and was selected as the Ohio Valley Conference (OVC) Player of the Year as a senior in 1999. Eley played professionally in Turkey, Spain, Italy and Iran.

== Early life ==
Eley was raised in Detroit primarily by relatives and in foster homes. He did not start playing organized basketball until his junior year at Martin Luther King High School. Eley averaged 18 points, 14 rebounds and 6 blocks per game as a senior. On April 22, 1994, he signed to play basketball at Southeast Missouri State University.

== College career ==
Eley sat out for his first season at Southeast Missouri due to not achieving Proposition 48 requirements. He averaged 17.3 points as a freshman during the 1995–96 season; he was selected as the Ohio Valley Conference (OVC) Newcomer of the Year and named to the All-OVC second-team.

Eley led the Redhawks in points (17.9), rebounds (10.3) and blocks (1.3) as a sophomore. Entering his junior year as a potential first-round candidate in the upcoming 1998 NBA draft, he missed most of the 1997–98 season after he broke bones in both of his feet. Eley declared as an early entrant for the 1998 NBA draft but withdrew. He was granted an extra year of collegiate eligibility by the National Collegiate Athletic Association (NCAA) in August 1998.

During his senior season in 1998–99, Eley led the Redhawks in points (15.3), rebounds (10.7), blocks (2.6) and field goal percentage (59.4%); the latter three were also the highest in the OVC. He was selected as the OVC Player of the Year in 1999.

Eley concluded his Redhawks career with program records in total rebounds (955) and blocks (178); his 1,611 points were fourth-best. He was also the only player in school history to record over 1,600 points and 900 rebounds.

Eley was inducted into the Southeast Missouri Athletics Hall of Fame in 2009.

== Professional career ==
Eley was not selected in the 1999 NBA draft. He started his professional career in Turkey. Eley was selected by the Detroit Dogs of the American Basketball Association in the 2000 veteran player draft. Eley led the Türkiye Basketbol Ligi in scoring during the 2000–01 season with 23.9 points per game. He returned from Turkey in March 2001 to join the Dogs. Eley attended training camp with the Atlanta Hawks in 2002.

Eley spent the 2002–03 season with Auna Gran Canaria in Spain. He averaged 15.8 points and 8.1 rebounds per game. Eley played with the Golden State Warriors during the 2003 NBA Summer League. Eley played with Scavolini Pesaro of Italy in the 2003–04 season, averaging 8.7 points and 5.9 rebounds per game. On July 12, 2004, he signed with Granada in Spain on a two-year deal. He averaged 9 points and 5 rebounds per game during the 2004–05 season. Eley suffered an injury in April 2005 and was released by the team.

Eley signed with Llanera Menorca for the 2005–06 season. He joined Grupo Capitol Valladolid in 2006 and then re-signed with them in 2007. On July 16, 2008, Eley returned to Llanera Menorca (now ViveMenorca) for the 2008–09 season. On March 4, 2009, he was released by ViveMenorca after the team lost 10 consecutive games. Eley spent the 2009–10 season with Mahram Tehran until he was ruled out with an injury. On August 23, 2010, he signed with Melilla Baloncesto in Italy.
