= Marshawn Powell =

American basketball player (born 1990)

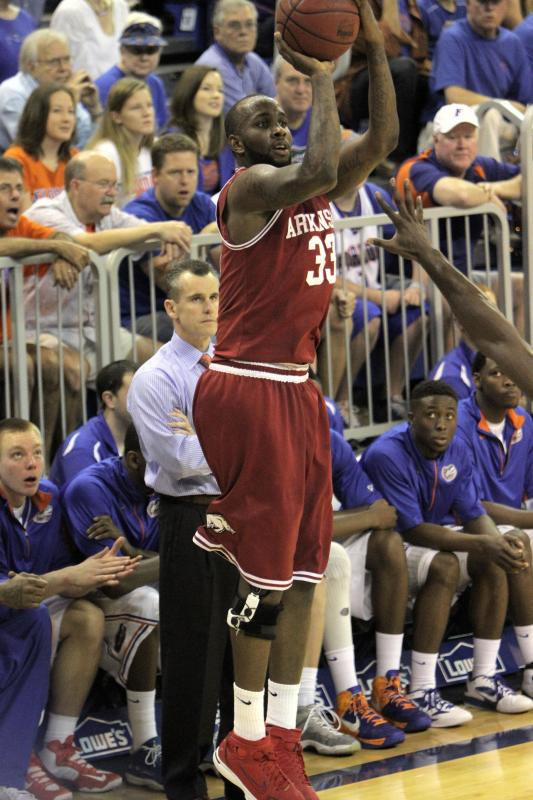

Leche Río Breogán
- Position: Power forward
- League: LEB Oro

Personal information
- Born: January 5, 1990 (age 36) Newport News, Virginia
- Listed height: 6 ft 7 in (2.01 m)
- Listed weight: 229 lb (104 kg)

Career information
- High school: The Miller School (Yancey Mills, Virginia)
- College: Arkansas (2009–2013)
- NBA draft: 2013: undrafted
- Playing career: 2013–present

Career history
- 2016–2017: s.Oliver Würzburg
- 2017–2018: Poderosa P. Montegranaro
- 2018–2019: GSA Udine
- 2019: Hamburg Towers
- 2019–present: Breogán

Marshawn Powell (born January 5, 1990) is an American basketball player for Leche Río Breogán of the LEB Oro. He played college basketball at Arkansas. He formerly played for s.Oliver Würzburg of the Basketball Bundesliga in Germany.
