= Alessandro Tonolli =

Italian basketball player (born 1974)

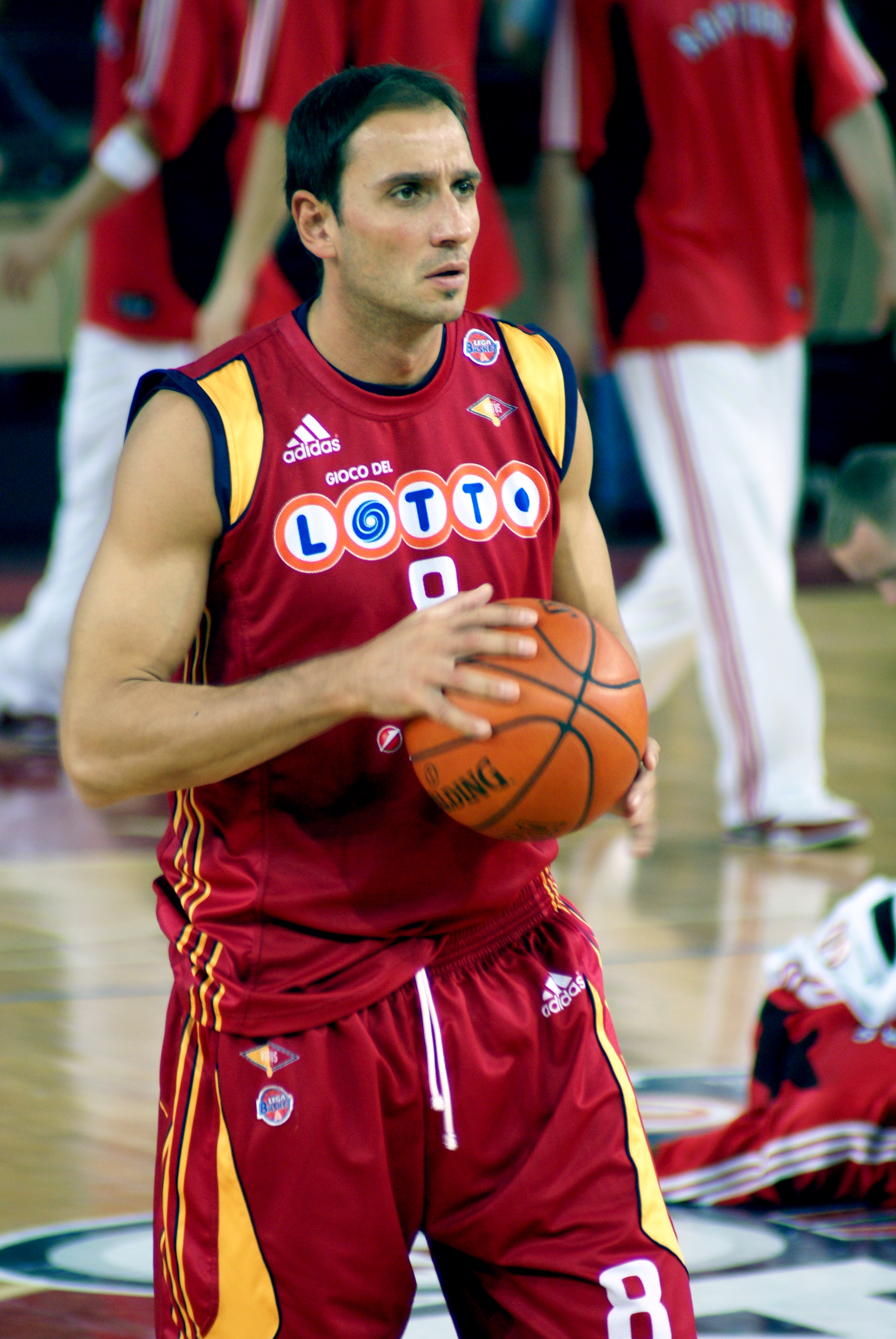

Personal information
- Born: 25 June 1974 (age 52) Caprino Veronese, Italy
- Listed height: 6 ft 8 in (2.03 m)
- Listed weight: 220 lb (100 kg)

Career information
- NBA draft: 1996: undrafted
- Playing career: 1992–present
- Position: Power forward / center

Career history
- 1992–1994: Brescia
- 1994–2014: Virtus Roma

Alessandro Tonolli (born 25 June 1974) is an Italian professional basketball player for Virtus Roma of the Italian League. At 202 cm, he plays the power forward and center positions.
