= Michael Andersen =

Danish basketball player

Personal information
- Born: 29 January 1974 (age 52) Copenhagen, Denmark
- Listed height: 7 ft 0 in (2.13 m)
- Listed weight: 271 lb (123 kg)

Career information
- College: Rhode Island (1993–1997)
- NBA draft: 1997: undrafted
- Playing career: 1997–2009
- Position: Center
- Number: 14

Career history
- 1997–1999: AEK Athens
- 1999–2000: Kinder Bologna
- 2000–2002: Peristeri
- 2002–2005: Pompea Napoli
- 2005–2007: Prokom Sopot
- 2007: Legea Scafati
- 2007–2008: Czarni Słupsk
- 2008–2009: AEK Athens

Michael Dahl Andersen (born 29 January 1974) is a Danish retired professional basketball player. He is 2.13 m (7 ft 0 in) in height and he plays at the position of center.

== Honours ==
=== Prokom Sopot ===
- 2-time Polish League championship: 2006, 2007
