= PalaBarbuto =

Indoor sports arena in Naples, Italy

Coordinates: 40.822442°N 14.179214°E

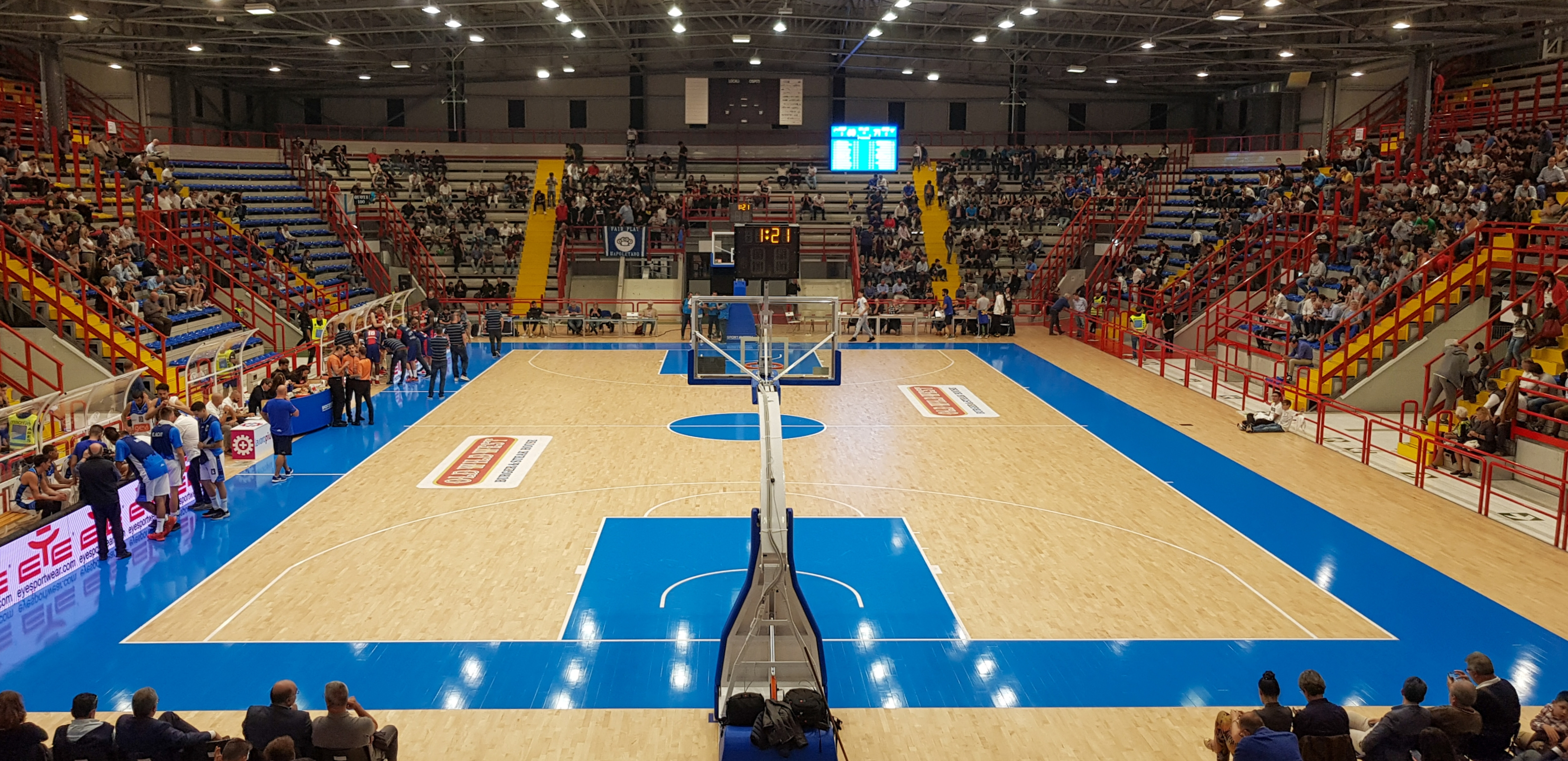
- Interactive map of PalaBarbuto
- Full name: Palazzetto dello Sport "Lello Barbuto"
- Location: Naples, Italy
- Owner: City of Naples
- Capacity: 5,500

Construction
- Groundbreaking: 2003
- Built: 2003
- Expanded: 2006

Tenant
- Napoli Basket (Serie A) (2016–present)

PalaBarbuto is an indoor sporting arena located in Naples, Italy. The facility is located in Viale Giochi del Mediterraneo, in close proximity to the Olympic swimming pool Piscina Felice Scandone.

== History ==
The arena was built and inaugurated in 2003, with a capacity of 4,000 seats, to host Napoli Basket matches, due to the structural decay of the Mario Argento, located opposite on viale Giochi del Mediterraneo. Originally named after the sports reporter Lello Barbuto and now bearing the name of Eldo Megastore, a chain of Italian electronics mega stores, it is currently the home of the professional basketball teams Nuova AMG Sebastiani Basket of the Lega Basket and Eldo Napoli. In September 2006, its seating capacity was increased to 5,500 in order to comply with Euroleague arena requirements, which at that time required a minimum of 5,000 seats. In 2016, PalaBarbuto was closed for a number of games due to problems with electrical and fire safety systems.

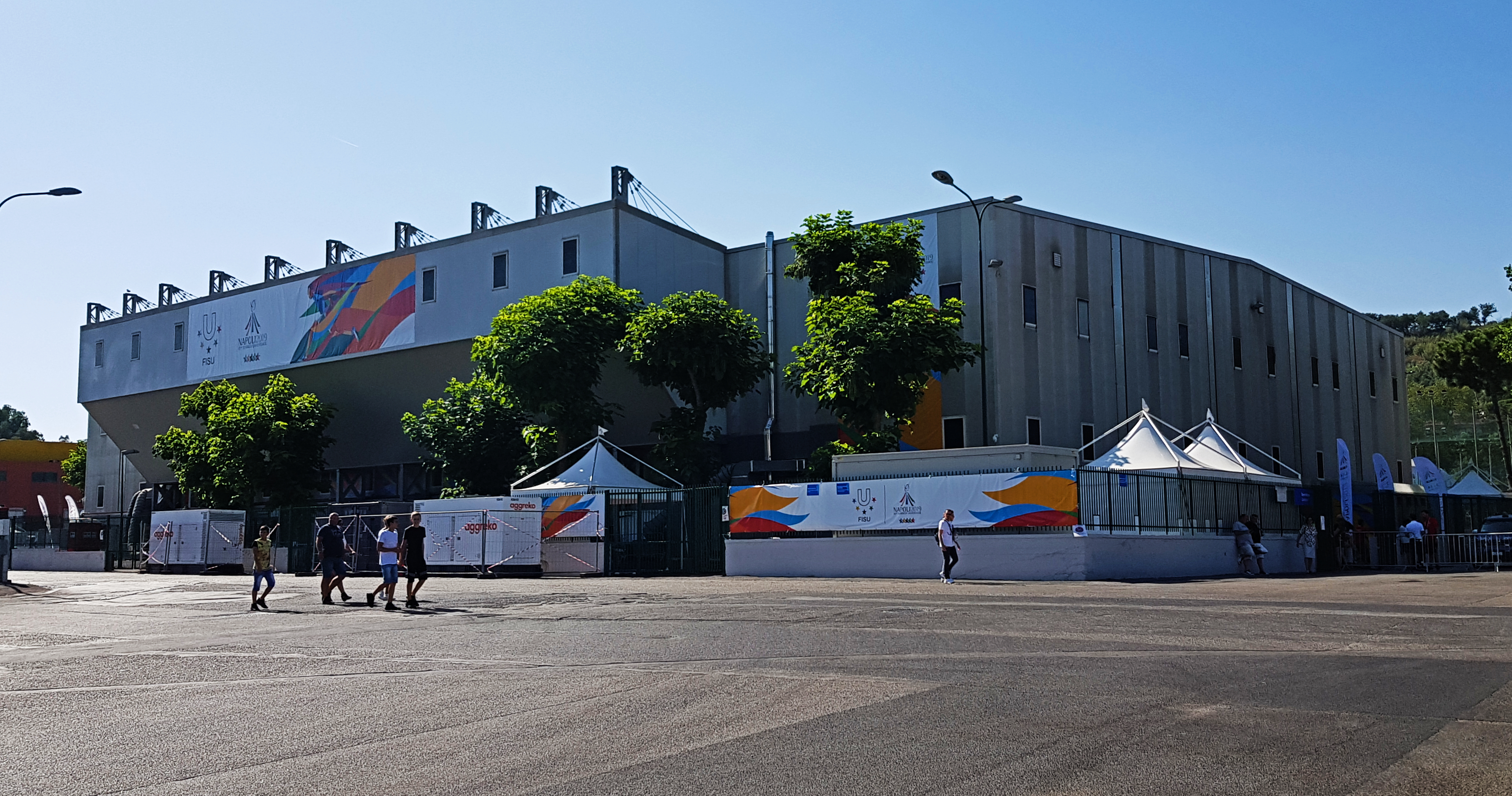
External view of the arena on the occasion of the 2019 Summer Universiade

=== Restyling for the 2019 Universiade ===
In 2019, in view of the 2019 Summer Universiade, the facility underwent a profound restyling work: the parquet was replaced, as well as the lighting system, changing rooms and services. Safety measures were improved and the necessary interventions were carried out to make the upper grandstand usable again, bringing the arena's capacity back to 5,500 seats. In compliance with FISU requirements, two LED wall screens were installed, rented specifically for the event and removed at the end. Two new LED walls, similar to those used for the Universiade, were installed the following September, to replace the old luminous display board.

== Hosted events ==
- 2003–2008 Men's basketball Serie A national championship;
- 2006–2010 Serie A1 women's basketball national championship;
- 2006–2007 EuroLeague;
- 2004–2005 ULEB Cup;
- 2005–2006 EuroLeague Women;
- 2–3 April 2005 - Finals of the EuroCup for women's basketball;
- 2006 – Harlem Globetrotters Tour;
- April 12, 2007 – Friendly match between Phard Napoli and USA National Team;
- May 16, 2007 – Conquest of the Scudetto by Phard Napoli;
- 29 June 2007 – Italy-USA of men's Volleyball for the World League;
- 2-4 December 2010 – 88th Italian Boxing Championships;
- 14 December 2010 – Italy-Spain friendly match of Futsal;
- 2011-2012 – Divisione Nazionale A Men's Basketball National Championship;
- 2012 – Men's basketball LegaDue national championship;
- 2013–2014 – Divisione Nazionale A Gold championship;
- 2016–2017 – National Championship Serie B 2016-17 (men's basketball);
- 2017 – Vesuvio Cup (international friendly trophy of volleyball);
- 2019 – Men's and women's basketball competitions of the 2019 Summer Universiade.
- 2023 – Final Eight LBA Next Gen Cup
