= Dan Callahan =

American football player (born 1938)

No. 61
- Position: Guard

Personal information
- Born: July 11, 1938 (age 88); Akron, Ohio, U.S.
- Listed height: 6 ft 0 in (1.83 m)
- Listed weight: 230 lb (104 kg)

Career information
- High school: East
- College: Akron, Wooster

Career history
- New York Titans (1960)
- Stats at Pro Football Reference

Dan Earl Callahan (born July 11, 1938) is an American former professional football player who was a guard with the New York Titans of the American Football League (AFL). He played college football for the Wooster Fighting Scots and the Akron Zips.
