= Germán Scarone =

Italian-Argentine basketball player

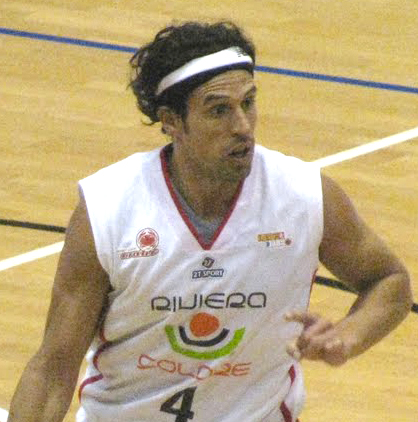

Personal information
- Born: 27 February 1975 (age 51) Buenos Aires, Argentina
- Listed height: 6 ft 3 in (1.91 m)
- Listed weight: 190 lb (86 kg)

Career information
- Playing career: 1993–present
- Position: Point guard

Career history
- 1993–1994: Benetton Treviso
- 1994–1995: Basket Cervia
- 1995–1998: Basket Rimini
- 1998–2000: Montecatini S.C.
- 2000–2002: Mens Sana Siena
- 2002–2003: Virtus Bologna
- 2003–2005: Victoria Libertas Pesaro
- 2005: Viola Reggio Calabria
- 2005–2011: Basket Rimini Crabs
- 2011–2012: U.C. Piacentina
- 2012–2013: S.C. Montecatini
- 2014: Basket Rimini Crabs
- 2014–: Pall. Monsummano

Germán Claudio Scarone (born 27 February 1975) is an Italian-Argentine professional basketball player. He is a point guard, who is currently playing for Pallacanestro Monsummano of the Italian Serie B.

Scarone made his debut with the senior men's Italian national basketball team in 1998, and competed with Italy at the 2000 Summer Olympics.

== Honors and awards ==
=== Treviso ===
- Italian Cup (1): (1995)

=== Siena ===
- FIBA Saporta Cup (1): (2002)
