= S.S. Basket Napoli =

- Founded: 1946
- Dissolved: 2009
- Arena: PalaBarbuto (capacity: 5,500)
- Location: Naples, Italy
- Team colors: White and Blue
- President: Mario Maione (owner)
- Head coach: Maurizio Bartocci
- Championships: 1 Italian Cup (2006)
- Website: basketnapoli.it
Home	Away

S.S. Basket Napoli was an Italian professional basketball club that was based in Naples, Campania. The club's full name was Società Sportiva Basket Napoli. The team ceased activities in 2009.

For past club sponsorship names, see sponsorship names.

== History ==
The team was playing in the second division LegaDue as Serapide Pozzuoli when it was moved to Naples and came under the ownership of Mario Maione. After the 2001–2002 season, the club was promoted to the first division Serie A after winning the LegaDue. Basket Napoli took part in the ULEB Cup 2004-05, in the 2006-07 EuroLeague and won the Italian Cup in 2006.

In September 2008, Basket Napoli was excluded from the Serie A along with Orlandina Basket due to financial problems. Restarting from the regional leagues, the side was dissolved in 2009.

== Notable players ==
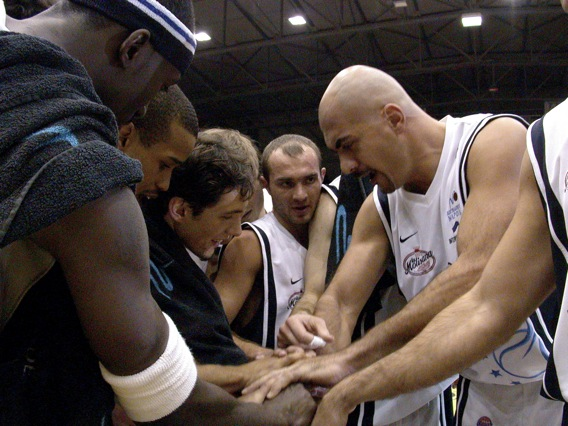
Carpisa Napoli players in 2006.

Note: Flags indicate national team eligibility at FIBA-sanctioned events. Players may hold other non-FIBA nationalities not displayed.

Criteria

To appear in this section a player must have either:

- Set a club record or won an individual award while at the club
- Played at least one official international match for their national team at any time
- Played at least one official NBA match at any time.

2000's

- (United States) Tierre Brown 1 season: '06-'07
- (United States) Larry O'Bannon 1 season: '06-'07
- (United States) - (Georgia (country)) Tyrone Ellis 1 season: '06-'07
- (United States) Ansu Sesay 2 seasons: '05-'07
- (France) Michel Morandais 2 seasons: '05-'07
- (United States) Lynn Greer 1 season: '05-'06
- (United States) Jeff Trepagnier 2 seasons: '04-'05, '06-'07
- (United States) Jerome Allen 2 seasons: '03-'05
- (Denmark) Michael Andersen 3 seasons: '02-'05
- (United States) Bennett Davison 2 seasons: '02-'04
- (Venezuela) Óscar Torres 2 seasons: '02-'04
- (United States) Mike Penberthy 4 seasons: '01-'05
- (United States) Dontae' Jones 2 seasons: '01-'03
- (United States) Henry Williams 1 season: '01-'02
- (United States) Andre Hutson 1 season: '01-'02
- (United States) LaMarr Greer 2 seasons: '00-'01, '02-'03
- (United States) John Turner 2 seasons: '00-'02
- (United States) Randolph Childress 1 season: '00-'01
- (Italy) - (Croatia) Nikola Radulović 1 season: '00-'01
- (Italy) Andrea Dallamora 1 season: '00-'01

1990's

- (Italy) Stefano Rajola 4 seasons: '99-'03
- (United States) Venson Hamilton 1 season: '99-'00
- (United States) Bill Jones 2 seasons: '98-'00
- (United States) Charles Smith 2 seasons: '98-'00
- (United States) - (Portugal) Michael Richmond 1 season: '98-'99
- (Italy) Gianluca Lulli 2 seasons: '97-'99
- (United States) Darren Morningstar 1 season: '97-'98
- (Italy) - (United States) Larry Middleton 1 season: '96-'97
- (United States) Marty Embry 1 season: '96-'97
- (United States) Alex English 1 season: '91-'92

1980's

- (United States) Russell Cross 1 season: '86-'87

2000's

- (Italy) Domenico Morena 14 seasons: '87-'95, '99-'00, '02-'07

== Sponsorship names ==
Throughout the years, due to sponsorship, the club has been known as :

- Serapide Pozzuoli (1995–99)
- Record Napoli (1999–01)
- Pastificio di Nola Napoli (2001–02)
- Pompea Napoli (2002–05)
- Carpisa Napoli (2005–06)
- Eldo Basket Napoli (2006–08)
