= 1995 FIBA Under-19 World Championship =

1995 FIBA Under-19 Basketball World Cup
Tournament details
- Host country: Greece
- Dates: 12–22 July
- Teams: 16 (from 5 federations)
- Venues: 5 (in 5 host cities)

Final positions
- Champions: Greece (1st title)

Tournament statistics
- MVP: (Greece) Efthimios Rentzias
- Top scorer: (Greece) Efthimios Rentzias (22.8)
- Top rebounds: (Greece) Efthimios Rentzias (12.2)
- Top assists: (Venezuela) Yumerving Mijares (4.5)
- PPG (Team): Greece (99.4)
- RPG (Team): Greece (46.0)
- APG (Team): Australia (18.6)

Official website
- 1995 FIBA U19 World Championship

The 1995 FIBA Under-19 World Championship (Greek: 1995 Παγκόσμιο Πρωτάθλημα FIBA Under-19) was the 5th edition of the FIBA U19 World Championship. It was held in multiple cities in Greece, from 12 to 22 July 1995. Host country Greece, won their first (and only, as of 2021), championship in the tournament, after going undefeated and beating Australia, 91-73 in the Gold Medal Game. Spain notched their first-ever podium finish, after defeating Croatia 77-64 in the Bronze Medal Game. Efthimios Rentzias of Greece, was named the tournament MVP.

== Venues ==
Location	City	Round
1995 FIBA Under-19 World Championship is located in Greece	Athens	Second and knockout stages
1995 FIBA Under-19 World Championship is located in Greece	Thessaloniki	Preliminary stage
1995 FIBA Under-19 World Championship is located in Greece	Lamia	Preliminary stage
1995 FIBA Under-19 World Championship is located in Greece	Larissa	Preliminary stage
1995 FIBA Under-19 World Championship is located in Greece	Patras	Preliminary stage

== Qualified teams ==
Means of Qualification	Dates	Venue	Berths	Qualifiers
Host Nation	—N/a	—N/a	1	Greece
Defending Champions	26 July – 4 August 1991	(Canada) Edmonton	1	United States
1994 FIBA Under-18 African Championship	18–25 July 1994	(Cameroon) Yaoundé	2	Nigeria; Angola
1994 FIBA Under-18 Americas Championship	17 August – 3 September 1994	(Argentina) Santa Rosa	3	Argentina; Puerto Rico; Venezuela
1995 FIBA Under-18 Asian Championship	3–11 March 1995	(Philippines) Manila	3	South Korea; China; Jordan
1994 FIBA Under-18 European Championship	18–25 July 1994	(Israel) Tel Aviv	5	Lithuania; Croatia; Spain; Italy; France
1994 FIBA Under-18 Oceania Championship	—N/a	—N/a	1	Australia
Total			16	

== Preliminary round ==
=== Group A ===
Team	Pld	W	L	PF	PA	PD	Pts
Lithuania	3	3	0	241	224	+17	6
Croatia	3	2	1	238	213	+25	5
Venezuela	3	1	2	252	251	+1	4
China	3	0	3	229	276	–46	3

12 July 1995
19:30

Boxscore

China	71–90	Croatia
Scoring by half: 36–45, 35–45
Pts: Wang 21; Rebs: Wang 12; Asts: Tao 6		Pts: Giriček 22; Rebs: Milisa 11; Asts: Novosel 5

Lamia

12 July 1995
21:30

Boxscore

Venezuela	84–85 (OT)	Lithuania
Scoring by half: 35–35, 41–41 Overtime: 8–9
Pts: Arteaga 26; Rebs: Osorio 8 Asts: Mijares 5		Pts: Jasikevičius 23; Rebs: Jurkūnas 12; Asts: Marčiulionis 3

Lamia

13 July 1995
19:30

Boxscore

Croatia	78–71	Venezuela
Scoring by half: 39–29, 38–42
Pts: Milisa 22; Rebs: Milisa 11; Asts: Giriček 6		Pts: Guevara 23; Rebs: Osorio 17; Asts: Guevara 6

Lamia

13 July 1995
21:30

Boxscore

Lithuania	85–70	China
Scoring by half: 38–35, 47–35
Pts: Šeštokas 27; Rebs: Šeštokas 20; Asts: Marčiulionis 4		Pts: Wang 19; Rebs: Wang 8 Asts: Tao 4

Lamia

14 July 1995
19:30

Boxscore

China	88–97	Venezuela
Scoring by half: 42–41, 46–56
Pts: Wang 23; Rebs: Wang 12; Asts: Jin 6		Pts: Arteaga, Guevara 25; Rebs: Arteaga 7 Asts: Mijares 9

Lamia

14 July 1995
21:30

Boxscore

Lithuania	71–70	Croatia
Scoring by half: 31–34, 40–36
Pts: Jasikevičius 19; Rebs: Jurkūnas 11; Asts: 4 players 3		Pts: Zemljić 20; Rebs: Zemljić, Nicević 7 Asts: Giriček 3

Lamia

=== Group B ===
Team	Pld	W	L	PF	PA	PD	Pts
France	3	3	0	214	179	+35	6
Argentina	3	2	1	261	223	+38	5
South Korea	3	1	2	212	230	–18	4
Nigeria	3	0	3	194	249	–55	3

12 July 1995
19:30

Boxscore

Nigeria	55–76	France
Scoring by half: 27–37, 28–39
Pts: Abdulsalam 12; Rebs: Udezue 7 Asts: Suobo 5		Pts: Laure 19; Rebs: Weis 11; Asts: Zadro 4

Patras

12 July 1995
21:30

Boxscore

South Korea	83–93	Argentina
Scoring by half: 34–46, 49–47
Pts: Cho W. 26; Rebs: Kim 5 Asts: Cho S. 4		Pts: Olivares 28; Rebs: Olivares 9 Asts: Olivares, Victoriano 3

Patras

13 July 1995
19:30

Boxscore

Argentina	102–70	Nigeria
Scoring by half: 58–35, 44–35
Pts: Budding, Palladino, Riofrío 15; Rebs: Olivares 10; Asts: Sánchez 9		Pts: Abdulsalam 25; Rebs: Abdulsalam 19; Asts: Luga 2

Patras

13 July 1995
21:30

Boxscore

France	68–58	South Korea
Scoring by half: 30–27, 38–31
Pts: Laure 17; Rebs: Weis 12; Asts: Zadro 6		Pts: Cho S. 26; Rebs: Cho W., Kim 3 Asts: Cho S. 3

Patras

14 July 1995
19:30

Boxscore

Nigeria	69–71	South Korea
Scoring by half: 23–27, 46–44
Pts: Madagwa 19; Rebs: Usman, Udezue, Abdulsalam 9 Asts: Mohammed 3		Pts: Cho S. 36; Rebs: Lee 7 Asts: Cho S., Kim 3

Patras

14 July 1995
21:30

Boxscore

Argentina	66–70	France
Scoring by half: 31–36, 35–34
Pts: Budding 17; Rebs: Olivares 10; Asts: Sánchez 3		Pts: Kraidy 20; Rebs: Kraidy 11; Asts: Kraidy 3

Patras

=== Group C ===
Team	Pld	W	L	PF	PA	PD	Pts
Australia	3	3	0	223	170	+53	6
United States	3	2	1	205	183	+22	5
Italy	3	1	2	214	213	+1	4
Jordan	3	0	3	150	226	–76	3

12 July 1995
19:30

Boxscore

Jordan	64–87	Italy
Scoring by half: 28–36, 36–51
Pts: Odeh 15; Rebs: Al-Khas 11; Asts: Shaban 4		Pts: Righetti 21; Rebs: Gironi, Barbieri 7 Asts: Rombaldoni, Bulleri 6

Larissa

12 July 1995
21:30

Boxscore

Australia	71–69	United States
Scoring by half: 35–29, 36–40
Pts: Trahair 23; Rebs: Mackinnon 10; Asts: Mackinnon, Shanahan, Trahair 3		Pts: Walker 26; Rebs: Walker 10; Asts: Langdon 5

Larissa

13 July 1995
19:30

Boxscore

United States	61–51	Jordan
Scoring by half: 32–29, 29–22
Pts: Marbury 17; Rebs: Fowlkes 12; Asts: Marbury 4		Pts: Al-Khas 20; Rebs: Al-Khas 12; Asts: 4 players 1

Larissa

13 July 1995
21:30

Boxscore

Italy	66–74	Australia
Scoring by half: 35–45, 31–29
Pts: Righetti, Barbieri 13; Rebs: Gironi 8 Asts: Bulleri 5		Pts: Trahair 20; Rebs: Mackinnon, Dwight 7 Asts: Trahair 8

Larissa

14 July 1995
19:30

Boxscore

Jordan	35–78	Australia
Scoring by half: 18–40, 17–38
Pts: Al-Khas 12; Rebs: Al-Khas, Odeh 9 Asts: Odeh 2		Pts: Shanahan 11; Rebs: Doherty 11; Asts: Shanahan, Drmic 4

Larissa

14 July 1995
21:30

Boxscore

United States	75–61	Italy
Scoring by half: 35–37, 40–24
Pts: Marbury 29; Rebs: Walker 17; Asts: Langdon 6		Pts: Causin 17; Rebs: Gironi 11; Asts: Bulleri, Lamma 4

Larissa

=== Group D ===
Team	Pld	W	L	PF	PA	PD	Pts
Greece	3	3	0	346	197	+149	6
Spain	3	2	1	251	222	+29	5
Puerto Rico	3	1	2	224	270	–46	4
Angola	3	0	3	173	305	–132	3

12 July 1995
19:30

Boxscore

Angola	49–91	Spain
Scoring by half: 25–50, 24–41
Pts: Almeida 14; Rebs: Celestino, Almeida, Kialunda 6 Asts: Calei 3		Pts: Guillén 13; Rebs: Jiménez, Quesada 11; Asts: Larragán 5

Thessaloniki

12 July 1995
21:30

Boxscore

Puerto Rico	74–109	Greece
Scoring by half: 32–61, 42–48
Pts: Ortiz 12; Rebs: Fajardo 7 Asts: Burgos 7		Pts: Kakiouzis 23; Rebs: Rentzias 19; Asts: Chatzis 4

Thessaloniki

13 July 1995
19:30

Boxscore

Spain	90–69	Puerto Rico
Scoring by half: 49–34, 41–35
Pts: Vidaurreta 21; Rebs: de la Fuente 9 Asts: de la Fuente 6		Pts: Nieves 19; Rebs: Llanos 11; Asts: Quiñones 4

Thessaloniki

13 July 1995
21:30

Boxscore

Greece	133–53	Angola
Scoring by half: 69–31, 64–22
Pts: Kakiouzis 21; Rebs: Rentzias 11; Asts: Barlas 7		Pts: Almeida, Kialunda 10; Rebs: Kialunda 8 Asts: Calei, Guimarães, Almeida 2

Thessaloniki

14 July 1995
19:30

Boxscore

Angola	71–81	Puerto Rico
Scoring by half: 44–48, 27–33
Pts: Mendes, Guimarães 17; Rebs: Kialunda 14; Asts: Guimarães 2		Pts: Latimer 18; Rebs: Latimer 8 Asts: Quiñones 4

Thessaloniki

14 July 1995
21:30

Boxscore

Greece	104–70	Spain
Scoring by half: 54–36, 50–34
Pts: Kakiouzis 26; Rebs: Rentzias 9 Asts: Papanikolaou, Karagkoutis 5		Pts: Ayuso 12; Rebs: Ayuso, Junyent 8 Asts: Cazorla, de la Fuente 2

Thessaloniki

== Quarterfinal round ==
=== Group E ===
Team	Pld	W	L	PF	PA	PD	Pts
Australia	3	3	0	249	198	+51	6
Spain	3	2	1	235	228	+7	5
Lithuania	3	1	2	208	251	–43	4
Argentina	3	0	3	209	224	–15	3

17 July 1995
16:00

Boxscore

Lithuania	79–91	Spain
Scoring by half: 48–43, 31–48
Pts: Šeštokas 24; Rebs: Šeštokas 12; Asts: Jasikevičius 6		Pts: de la Fuente 21; Rebs: de la Fuente 12; Asts: Larragán, Cazorla 5

Athens

17 July 1995
18:00

Boxscore

Australia	78–71 (OT)	Argentina
Scoring by half: 29–42, 33–20 Overtime: 16–9
Pts: Mackinnon 17; Rebs: Mackinnon 12; Asts: McKinnon 7		Pts: Olivares 21; Rebs: Olivares 10; Asts: Victoriano, Riofrío 3

Athens

18 July 1995
16:00

Boxscore

Argentina	66–71	Lithuania
Scoring by half: 32–32, 34–39
Pts: Riofrío 20; Rebs: Olivares 10; Asts: Victoriano 2		Pts: Šeštokas 22; Rebs: Šeštokas, Jurkūnas 13; Asts: Jasikevičius 8

Athens

18 July 1995
18:00

Boxscore

Spain	69–77 (OT)	Australia
Scoring by half: 38–49, 28–17 Overtime: 3–11
Pts: de la Fuente 16; Rebs: Vidaurreta, de la Fuente 12; Asts: Larragán 3		Pts: Doherty 20; Rebs: Mackinnon 10; Asts: Mackinnon 4

Athens

19 July 1995
16:00

Boxscore

Argentina	72–75	Spain
Scoring by half: 39–31, 33–44
Pts: Sánchez 20; Rebs: Palladino 8 Asts: Sánchez, Victoriano 3		Pts: Iturbe 15; Rebs: de la Fuente 9 Asts: Larragán 4

Athens

19 July 1995
18:00

Boxscore

Lithuania	58–94	Australia
Scoring by half: 31–48, 27–46
Pts: Šeštokas 9 Rebs: Jasikevičius 6 Asts: Jasikevičius 4		Pts: Mackinnon 18; Rebs: Dwight 6 Asts: Trahair 8

Athens

=== Group F ===
Team	Pld	W	L	PF	PA	PD	Pts
Greece	3	3	0	278	208	+70	6
Croatia	3	2	1	230	227	+3	5
United States	3	1	2	208	242	–38	4
France	3	0	3	165	204	–39	3

17 July 1995
20:00

Boxscore

United States	65–62	France
Scoring by half: 38–28, 27–34
Pts: Marbury 20; Rebs: Fowlkes 7 Asts: Marbury 4		Pts: Dubos 16; Rebs: Kraidy, Laure 8 Asts: Gomis 3

Athens

17 July 1995
22:00

Boxscore

Croatia	80–109	Greece
Scoring by half: 37–68, 43–41
Pts: Zemljić 17; Rebs: Nicević 6 Asts: Giriček, Perinčić, Novosel 2		Pts: Rentzias 30; Rebs: Rentzias 11; Asts: Karagkoutis 6

Athens

18 July 1995
20:00

Boxscore

France	53–68	Croatia
Scoring by half: 21–40, 32–28
Pts: Weis 14; Rebs: Moïso 9 Asts: Pons 3		Pts: Zemljić 15; Rebs: Milisa 10; Asts: Giriček, Novosel 3

Athens

18 July 1995
22:00

Boxscore

Greece	98–78	United States
Scoring by half: 43–37, 55–41
Pts: Kakiouzis 29; Rebs: Rentzias 16; Asts: Kalaitzis 11		Pts: Marbury 23; Rebs: Walker 10; Asts: Marbury 6

Athens

19 July 1995
20:00

Boxscore

Croatia	82–65	United States
Scoring by half: 35–30, 47–35
Pts: Zemljić 28; Rebs: Nicević 11; Asts: Sesar 3		Pts: Marbury 16; Rebs: Domzalski 8 Asts: Marbury, Young 2

Athens

19 July 1995
22:00

Boxscore

France	50–71	Greece
Scoring by half: 31–27, 19–44
Pts: Pons 16; Rebs: Moïso 9 Asts: Pons, Zadro 2		Pts: Papanikolaou 27; Rebs: Papanikolaou 12; Asts: Kalaitzis 4

Athens

=== Group G ===
Team	Pld	W	L	PF	PA	PD	Pts	First Tiebreaker Classification for Tied Teams	Second Tiebreaker Basket Average for Tied Teams
Nigeria	3	2	1	222	217	+5	5	1W−1L	(144/143, 1.0070)
Venezuela	3	2	1	262	253	+9	5	1W−1L	(167/167, 1.0000)
Italy	3	2	1	232	187	+45	5	1W−1L	(139/140, 0.9929)
Angola	3	0	3	207	266	–59	3		

17 July 1995
10:00

Boxscore

Venezuela	95–86	Angola
Scoring by half: 42–49, 53–37
Pts: Arteaga 26; Rebs: Arteaga 12; Asts: Guevara 6		Pts: Guimarães, Kialunda 18; Rebs: Mendes 8 Asts: Guimarães, Almeida 3

Athens

17 July 1995
12:00

Boxscore

Italy	57–59	Nigeria
Scoring by half: 28–30, 29–29
Pts: Gironi 16; Rebs: Gironi 8 Asts: Lamma 4		Pts: Abdulsalam 19; Rebs: Abdulsalam 13; Asts: Samuel, Mohammed 2

Athens

18 July 1995
10:00

Boxscore

Nigeria	85–86	Venezuela
Scoring by half: 36–38, 49–48
Pts: Mohammed, Usman 15; Rebs: Paul 11; Asts: Samuel 4		Pts: Guevara 38; Rebs: Arteaga, Grant, Osorio 7 Asts: Mijares, Guevara 5

Athens

18 July 1995
12:00

Boxscore

Angola	47–93	Italy
Scoring by half: 23–49, 24–44
Pts: Almeida 10; Rebs: Almeida 5 Asts: Calei, Almeida 2		Pts: Righetti 16; Rebs: Maggioli 7 Asts: Bulleri 5

Athens

19 July 1995
10:00

Boxscore

Nigeria	78–74	Angola
Scoring by half: 41–34, 37–40
Pts: Abdulsalam 23; Rebs: Abdulsalam 11; Asts: Mohammed 4		Pts: Almeida 21; Rebs: Binge 9 Asts: Almeida 3

Athens

19 July 1995
12:00

Boxscore

Venezuela	81–82	Italy
Scoring by half: 41–40, 40–42
Pts: Arteaga 23; Rebs: Arteaga 12; Asts: Mijares 5		Pts: Causin 15; Rebs: Gironi 10; Asts: Lamma 5

Athens

=== Group H ===
Team	Pld	W	L	PF	PA	PD	Pts
Puerto Rico	3	3	0	281	258	+23	6
China	3	2	1	274	247	+27	5
South Korea	3	1	2	209	204	+5	4
Jordan	3	0	3	181	236	–55	3

17 July 1995
17:00

Boxscore

China	120–123 (OT)	Puerto Rico
Scoring by half: 46–49, 46–43 Overtime: 16–16, 12–15
Pts: Wang 34; Rebs: Wang 15; Asts: Yu 3		Pts: Ortiz, Nieves 27; Rebs: Llanos 13; Asts: Ortiz, Quiñones 5

Athens

17 July 1995
19:00

Boxscore

Jordan	60–68	South Korea
Scoring by half: 32–36, 28–32
Pts: Odeh 21; Rebs: Al-Khas 16; Asts: Al-Khas 2		Pts: Cho S. 25; Rebs: Lim, Kim 6 Asts: Lim, Cho S. 4

Athens

18 July 1995
17:00

Boxscore

South Korea	71–73	China
Scoring by half: 30–40, 41–33
Pts: Cho S. 18; Rebs: Kim 7 Asts: Hwang 3		Pts: Li Q. 21; Rebs: Zhu 11; Asts: Li Q., Wang 4

Athens

18 July 1995
19:00

Boxscore

Puerto Rico	87–68	Jordan
Scoring by half: 43–25, 44–43
Pts: Ortiz 15; Rebs: Latimer 7 Asts: Llanos, Hatton, Nieves 1		Pts: Al-Khas 22; Rebs: Al-Khas 10; Asts: Shaban 5

Athens

19 July 1995
17:00

Boxscore

China	81–53	Jordan
Scoring by half: 43–30, 38–23
Pts: Zhu 27; Rebs: Wang 14; Asts: Li N. 4		Pts: Odeh 11; Rebs: Al-Khas 9 Asts: Shaban 4

Athens

19 July 1995
19:00

Boxscore

South Korea	70–71	Puerto Rico
Scoring by half: 43–36, 27–35
Pts: Kim 14; Rebs: Cho W. 8 Asts: Kim 5		Pts: Ortiz 21; Rebs: Llanos, Latimer 9 Asts: Burgos, Latimer 3

Athens

== Classification 13th–16th ==
Semifinals
21 July
Italy	65
Jordan	45
21 July
Angola	77
South Korea	58

Thirteenth place
22 July
Italy	78
Angola	68
Fifteenth place
22 July
Jordan	61
South Korea	69

Source: FIBA Archive

=== Semifinals ===
21 July 1995
10:00

Boxscore

Italy	65–45	Jordan
Scoring by half: 30–19, 35–26
Pts: Benini 17; Rebs: Benini 9 Asts: Righetti 6		Pts: Odeh 11; Rebs: Al-Khas 5 Asts: Shaban 2

Athens

21 July 1995
12:00

Boxscore

Angola	77–58	South Korea
Scoring by half: 36–32, 41–26
Pts: Almeida 21; Rebs: Almeida 7 Asts: Kialunda 4		Pts: Cho S. 19; Rebs: Cho W. 6 Asts: Hwang 3

Athens

=== 15th place ===
22 July 1995
08:00

Boxscore

Jordan	61–69	South Korea
Scoring by half: 26–37, 35–32
Pts: Odeh 18; Rebs: Odeh 16; Asts: Shaban 3		Pts: Cho S. 19; Rebs: Cho W. 6 Asts: Hwang 5

Athens

=== 13th place ===
22 July 1995
10:00

Boxscore

Italy	78–68	Angola
Scoring by half: 32–27, 46–41
Pts: Righetti 18; Rebs: Maggioli 9 Asts: Bulleri, Lamma 2		Pts: Almeida 16; Rebs: Cunga, Celestino, Almeida 6 Asts: Almeida 4

Athens

== Classification 9th–12th ==
Semifinals
21 July
Nigeria	72
China	91
21 July
Puerto Rico	85
Venezuela	83

Ninth place
22 July
China	124
Puerto Rico	101
Eleventh place
22 July
Nigeria	84
Venezuela	78

Source: FIBA Archive

=== Semifinals ===
21 July 1995
16:00

Boxscore

Nigeria	72–91	China
Scoring by half: 35–36, 37–55
Pts: Abdulsalam 19; Rebs: Abdulsalam 12; Asts: Mohammed 2		Pts: Wang 31; Rebs: Wang 10; Asts: Li Q. 6

Athens

21 July 1995
18:00

Boxscore

Venezuela	83–85	Puerto Rico
Scoring by half: 35–50, 48–35
Pts: Mata 22; Rebs: Mata 10; Asts: Guevara 4		Pts: Fajardo 19; Rebs: Fajardo 16; Asts: Hatton 4

Athens

=== 11th place ===
22 July 1995
12:00

Boxscore

Nigeria	84–78	Venezuela
Scoring by half: 43–37, 41–41
Pts: Suobo, Abdulsalam 21; Rebs: Abdulsalam 14; Asts: Mohammed, Abdulsalam 2		Pts: Arteaga 23; Rebs: Osorio 12; Asts: Mijares 6

Athens

=== 9th place ===
22 July 1995
14:00

Boxscore

China	124–101	Puerto Rico
Scoring by half: 48–31, 76–70
Pts: Zhu 31; Rebs: Wang 14; Asts: Li Q. 6		Pts: Hatton 20; Rebs: Fajardo 8 Asts: Burgos 4

Athens

== Classification 5th–8th ==
Semifinals
21 July
Lithuania	85
France	81
21 July
United States	58
Argentina	67

Fifth place
22 July
Lithuania	89
Argentina	73
Seventh place
22 July
France	55
United States	92

Source: FIBA Archive

=== Semifinals ===
21 July 1995
16:00

Boxscore

Lithuania	85–81	France
Scoring by half: 36–42, 49–39
Pts: Jasikevičius 26; Rebs: Jurkūnas 7 Asts: Marčiulionis 7		Pts: Laure 20; Rebs: Moïso, Weis, Laure 8 Asts: Pons 4

Athens

21 July 1995
18:00

Boxscore

Argentina	67–58	United States
Scoring by half: 29–33, 38–25
Pts: Budding 14; Rebs: Riofrío 9 Asts: Riofrío 5		Pts: Fowlkes 13; Rebs: Carter 9 Asts: Marbury 5

Athens

=== 7th place ===
22 July 1995
16:00

Boxscore

France	55–92	United States
Scoring by half: 27–39, 28–53
Pts: Dubos 13; Rebs: Weis 11; Asts: Gomis, Weis, Laure 1		Pts: Fowlkes 22; Rebs: Carter 9 Asts: Wojciechowski 5

Athens

=== 5th place ===
22 July 1995
18:00

Boxscore

Lithuania	89–73	Argentina
Scoring by half: 37–34, 52–39
Pts: Jurkūnas 26; Rebs: Jurkūnas 12; Asts: Jasikevičius 7		Pts: Palladino 20; Rebs: Fernández 11; Asts: Sánchez, Budding 3

Athens

== Final round ==
Semifinals
21 July
Australia	76
Croatia	53
21 July
Greece	80
Spain	57

Final
22 July
Australia	73
Greece	91
Third place
22 July
Croatia	64
Spain	77

Source: FIBA Archive

=== Semifinals ===
21 July 1995
20:00

Boxscore

Australia	76–53	Croatia
Scoring by half: 31–22, 45–31
Pts: Trahair 23; Rebs: Dwight, McGregor 8 Asts: McKinnon, Trahair, Doherty 4		Pts: Milisa 12; Rebs: Nicević 13; Asts: Sesar, Milisa 2

Athens

21 July 1995
22:00

Boxscore

Spain	57–80	Greece
Scoring by half: 31–37, 26–43
Pts: Junyent 14; Rebs: Junyent 9 Asts: 6 players 1		Pts: Papanikolaou 20; Rebs: Papanikolaou 8 Asts: Karagkoutis 5

Athens

=== 3rd place ===
22 July 1995
20:00

Boxscore

Croatia	64–77	Spain
Scoring by half: 36–35, 28–42
Pts: Zemljić 19; Rebs: Zemljić, Nicević 5 Asts: Novosel 5		Pts: Vidaurreta 20; Rebs: Junyent 10; Asts: Larragán 3

Athens

=== Final ===
22 July 1995
22:00

Boxscore

Australia	73–91	Greece
Scoring by half: 48–47, 25–44
Pts: Trahair 27; Rebs: McGregor 8 Asts: McKinnon, Trahair 5		Pts: Rentzias 33; Rebs: Rentzias 21; Asts: 4 players 2

Athens

== Final standings ==
Rank	Team	Record
1st place, gold medalist(s)	Greece	8–0
2nd place, silver medalist(s)	Australia	7–1
3rd place, bronze medalist(s)	Spain	5–3
4th	Croatia	4–4
5th	Lithuania	6–2
6th	Argentina	3–5
7th	United States	4–4
8th	France	3–5
9th	China	4–4
10th	Puerto Rico	5–3
11th	Nigeria	3–5
12th	Venezuela	3–5
13th	Italy	5–3
14th	Angola	1–7
15th	South Korea	3–5
16th	Jordan	0–8

Source: FIBA Archive

== Awards ==
1995 FIBA Under-19 World Championship

Greece
First title

Most Valuable Player
(Greece) Efthimios Rentzias
