= Puerto Rico at the 1999 Pan American Games =

- IOC code: PUR
- NOC: Puerto Rico Olympic Committee

in Winnipeg 23 July – 8 August 1999
- Medals Ranked 13th: Gold 1 Silver 3 Bronze 8 Total 12

Pan American Games appearances (overview)
- 1951; 1955; 1959; 1963; 1967; 1971; 1975; 1979; 1983; 1987; 1991; 1995; 1999; 2003; 2007; 2011; 2015; 2019; 2023

The 13th Pan American Games were held in Winnipeg, Manitoba, Canada from July 23 to August 8, 1999.

== Medals ==
=== Gold ===
===== Sailing =====
- Mixed Hobie 16: Enrique Figueroa and Carla Malatrassi

=== Silver ===
===== Fencing =====
- Men's Épée Individual: Jonathan Peña

===== Judo =====
- Men's Lightweight (– 73 kg): Carlos Méndez
- Women's Lightweight (– 57 kg): Roxanna García

=== Bronze ===
===== Basketball =====
- Men's Team Competition: National Team

- Luis Allende, Ricardo Dalmau, Sharif Fajardo, Arnaldo Febres, Rolando Hourruitiner, Antonio Latimer, Fernando Ortíz, Edgar Padilla, Daniel Santiago, Eddin Santiago, Carmelo Travieso, and Orlando Vega

===== Boxing =====
- Men's Light Flyweight (– 48 kg): Iván Calderón

===== Gymnastics =====
- Men's Rings: Diego Lizardi
- Men's Pommel Horse: Luis Vargas

===== Racquetball =====
- Men's Singles: Rod de Jesús

===== Taekwondo =====
- Women's Middleweight (– 67 kg): Ineabelle Díaz
- Women's Heavyweight (+ 67 kg): Luz Medina

===== Weightlifting =====
- Men's Heavyweight (– 105 kg): Edries González

===== Wrestling =====
- Men's Freestyle (– 76 kg): Manuel García

== Results by event ==
=== Basketball ===
==== Men's team competition ====
- Team Roster

- Luis Allende
- Ricardo Dalmau
- Sharif Fajardo
- Arnaldo Febres
- Rolando Hourruitiner
- Antonio Latimer
- Fernando Ortíz
- Edgar Padilla
- Daniel Santiago
- Eddin Santiago
- Carmelo Travieso
- Orlando Vega

== See also ==
- Puerto Rico at the 2000 Summer Olympics
