= Basketball at the 2004 Summer Olympics – Men's tournament =

Tournament details
- Host country: Greece
- City: Athens
- Dates: 15 – 28 August 2004
- Teams: 12 (from 5 confederations)
- Venues: 2 (in 1 host city)

Final positions
- Champions: Argentina (1st title)
- Runners-up: Italy
- Third place: United States
- Fourth place: Lithuania

Tournament statistics
- Games played: 42
- MVP: (Argentina) Manu Ginóbili
- Top scorer: (Spain) Pau Gasol (22.4 points per game)

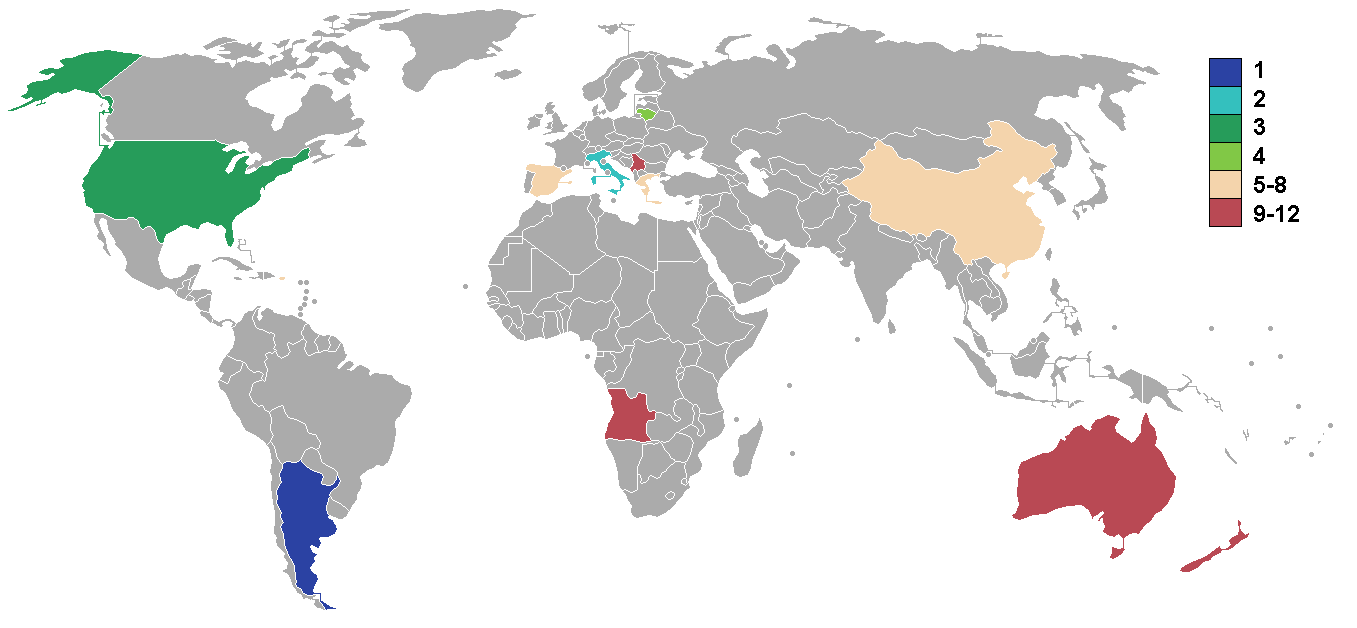
Competing teams.

The men's basketball tournament at the 2004 Summer Olympics in Athens, Greece began on 15 August and ended on 28 August, when Argentina defeated Italy 84–69 for the gold medal. The games were held at the Helliniko Olympic Indoor Arena and Olympic Indoor Hall.

== Medalists ==
Gold	Silver	Bronze
Argentina	Italy	United States

== Qualification ==
Country	Qualified as	Date of qualification	Previous appearance
Greece	Olympics host	Sep 5, 1997	1996
Serbia and Montenegro	World champion	Sep 8, 2002	2000
China	Asian champion	Oct 1, 2003	2000
Australia	Oceanian champion	Sep 4, 2003	2000
New Zealand	Oceanian runner-up	Sep 4, 2003	2000
Angola	African champion	Aug 19, 2003	2000
United States	Americas champion	Aug 31, 2003	2000
Argentina	Americas runner-up	Aug 31, 2003	1996
Puerto Rico	Americas third place	Aug 31, 2003	1996
Lithuania	European champion	Sep 14, 2003	2000
Spain	European runner-up	Sep 14, 2003	2000
Italy	European third place	Sep 14, 2003	2000

== Format ==
- Twelve teams are split into two preliminary round groups of six teams each.
- The top four teams from both groups qualify for the knockout stage.
- Fifth-placed teams from both groups compete for ninth place in an additional game.
- Sixth-placed teams from both groups compete for 11th place in an additional game.
- In the quarterfinals, the matchups are as follows: A1 vs. B4, A2 vs. B3, A3 vs. B2 and A4 vs. B1.
  - From the eliminated teams at the quarterfinals, the loser from A1 vs. B4 competes against the loser from B1 vs. A4 for seventh place in an additional game. The remaining two loser teams compete for fifth place in an additional game.
- The winning teams from the quarterfinals meet in the semifinals as follows: A1/B4 vs. A3/B2 and A2/B3 vs. A4/B1.
- The winning teams from the semifinals contest the gold medal. The losing teams contest the bronze.

Tie-breaking criteria:

1. Head to head results
2. Goal average (not the goal difference) between the tied teams
3. Goal average of the tied teams for all teams in its group

== Preliminary round ==
=== Group A ===
Pos	Team	Pld	W	L	PF	PA	PD	Pts	Qualification
1	Spain	5	5	0	405	349	+56	10	Quarterfinals
2	Italy	5	3	2	371	341	+30	8 (Note: Head-to-head record: Italy 1–0 Argentina)	Quarterfinals
3	Argentina	5	3	2	414	396	+18	8	Quarterfinals
4	China	5	2	3	303	382	−79	7	Quarterfinals
5	New Zealand	5	1	4	399	413	−14	6 (Note: Head-to-head record: New Zealand 1–0 Serbia and Montenegro)	9th place playoff
6	Serbia and Montenegro	5	1	4	377	388	−11	6	11th place playoff

Source: FIBA archive
Rules for classification: 1) points; 2) head-to-head points; 3) head-to-head goal average; 4) head-to-head number of points scored.
Notes:

All times are local (UTC+3)

15 August 2004
11:15

Italy	71–69	New Zealand
Scoring by quarter: 25–13, 14–9, 17–24, 15–23
Pts: Basile 16; Rebs: Chiacig 9 Asts: Pozzecco 7		Pts: Penney 20; Rebs: Marks 9 Asts: Cameron 5

Helliniko Indoor Arena, Athens
Attendance: 1,100
Referees:
Reynaldo Sanchez (Dominican Republic)
Renato Santos (Brazil)

15 August 2004
14:30

China	58–83	Spain
Scoring by quarter: 18–18, 12–24, 13–19, 15–22
Pts: Li Nan 14; Rebs: Mo Ke, Yao Ming 8 each Asts: Liu Wei 2		Pts: Gasol 21; Rebs: Gasol 10; Asts: Calderón, Gasol 2 each

Helliniko Indoor Arena, Athens
Attendance: 9,500
Referees:
Lazaros Voreadis (Greece)
Jorge Vazquez (Puerto Rico)

15 August 2004
16:45

Argentina	83–82	Serbia and Montenegro
Scoring by quarter: 27–15, 22–24, 12–20, 22–23
Pts: Ginóbili 27; Rebs: Wolkowyski 6 Asts: Ginóbili 3		Pts: Radmanović 21; Rebs: Dejan Tomašević 10; Asts: 3 players, 1 each

Olympic Indoor Hall, Athens
Attendance: 10,500
Referees: Virginijus Dovidavicius (LTU), José Carrión (PUR)

17 August 2004
9:00

New Zealand	62–69	China
Scoring by quarter: 14–17, 6–12, 25–22, 17–18
Pts: Jones 27; Rebs: Book, Marks 7 each Asts: Dickel 2		Pts: Yao Ming 39; Rebs: Yao Ming 13; Asts: Li Nan, Liu Wei 4 each

Helliniko Indoor Arena, Athens
Attendance: 1,300
Referees:
Christos Christodoulou (Greece)
Virginijus Dovidavicius (Lithuania)

17 August 2004
16:45

Serbia and Montenegro	74–72	Italy
Scoring by quarter: 16–17, 20–19, 19–14, 19–22
Pts: Rakočević 19; Rebs: Tomašević 12; Asts: Tomašević 5		Pts: Bulleri 15; Rebs: Chiacig, Radulović 5 each Asts: Bulleri, Pozzecco 2 each

Helliniko Indoor Arena, Athens
Attendance: 12,500
Referees:
José Ronfini (Mexico)
Sean Corbin(United States)

17 August 2004
20:00

Spain	87–76	Argentina
Scoring by quarter: 25–18, 10–22, 23–20, 29–16
Pts: Gasol 26; Rebs: Gasol 8 Asts: Calderón 5		Pts: Scola 28; Rebs: Scola 9 Asts: 3 players, 4 each

Helliniko Indoor Arena, Athens
Attendance: 12,000
Referees: Lazaros Voreadis (GRE), Mike Homsy (CAN)

19 August 2004
9:00

Serbia and Montenegro	87–90	New Zealand
Scoring by quarter: 20–22, 24–17, 22–16, 21–35
Pts: Bodiroga 25; Rebs: Bodiroga 6 Asts: Rakočević 2		Pts: Penney 15; Rebs: Marks 5 Asts: Dickel 6

Helliniko Indoor Arena, Athens
Attendance: 4,200
Referees:
Jorge Vazquez (Puerto Rico)
Philippe Leemann (Switzerland)

19 August 2004
11:15

Italy	63–71	Spain
Scoring by quarter: 22–17, 11–18, 19–13, 11–23
Pts: Righetti 18; Rebs: Chiacig, Marconato 8 each Asts: Basile 3		Pts: Garbajosa 17; Rebs: Garbajosa 8 Asts: Garbajosa 3

Olympic Indoor Hall, Athens
Attendance: 8,950
Referees:
José Carrión (Puerto Rico)
Michael Aylen (Australia)

19 August 2004
20:00

Argentina	82–57	China
Scoring by quarter: 22–14, 19–7, 24–18, 17–18
Pts: Nocioni 17; Rebs: Delfino, Nocioni 6 each Asts: Scola, Sconochini 4 each		Pts: Yao Ming 15; Rebs: Yao Ming 7 Asts: Liu Wei 2

Helliniko Indoor Arena, Athens
Attendance: 12,000
Referees: Sean Corbin (USA), Scott Buttler (AUS)

21 August 2004
11:15

Spain	76–68	Serbia and Montenegro
Scoring by quarter: 18–14, 13–17, 20–21, 25–16
Pts: Calderón 15; Rebs: Reyes 6 Asts: Garbajosa, Navarro 3 each		Pts: Bodiroga 14; Rebs: Tomašević 9 Asts: Rakočević 3

Helliniko Indoor Arena, Athens
Attendance: 10,350
Referees:
Renato Santos (Brazil)
José Monfini (Mexico)

21 August 2004
14:30

New Zealand	94–98	Argentina
Scoring by quarter: 25–23, 17–24, 29–29, 23–22
Pts: Jones 25; Rebs: Book 6 Asts: Dickel 7		Pts: Scola 25; Rebs: Oberto 9 Asts: Montecchia, Oberto 5 each

Helliniko Indoor Arena, Athens
Attendance: 8,000
Referees: Virginijus Dovidavicius (LTU), Christos Christodoulou (GRE)

21 August 2004
16:45

China	52–89	Italy
Scoring by quarter: 11–22, 15–22, 13–16, 13–29
Pts: Li Nan, Yao Ming 9 each Rebs: Yi Jianlian 7 Asts: Yao Ming 2		Pts: Galanda 22; Rebs: Soragna 5 Asts: Pozzecco 12

Helliniko Indoor Arena, Athens
Attendance: 7,600
Referees:
Lazaros Voreadis (Greece)
Jorge Vazquez (Puerto Rico)

23 August 2004
9:00

Spain	88–84	New Zealand
Scoring by quarter: 19–11, 29–26, 25–31, 15–16
Pts: Garbajosa 17; Rebs: Gasol 10; Asts: Calderón 3		Pts: Jones 23; Rebs: Marks 10; Asts: Dickel 5

Helliniko Indoor Arena, Athens
Attendance: 4,252
Referees:
José Carrión (Puerto Rico)
Mike Homsy (Canada)

23 August 2004
16:45

Serbia and Montenegro	66–67	China
Scoring by quarter: 21–16, 13–15, 20–20, 12–16
Pts: Drobnjak 17; Rebs: Tomašević 11; Asts: Tomašević 4		Pts: Yao Ming 27; Rebs: Yao Ming 13; Asts: Liu Wei 3

Helliniko Indoor Arena, Athens
Attendance: 11,150
Referees:
Christos Christodoulou (Greece)
Michael Aylen (Australia)

23 August 2004
20:00

Italy	76–75	Argentina
Scoring by quarter: 13–23, 22–13, 18–18, 23–21
Pts: Pozzecco 17; Rebs: Bulleri 6 Asts: Bulleri 4		Pts: Ginóbili, Scola 19 each Rebs: Wolkowyski 7 Asts: Ginóbili 3

Helliniko Indoor Arena, Athens
Attendance: 12,000
Referees: Lazaros Voreadis (GRE), Sean Corbin (USA)

=== Group B ===
Pos	Team	Pld	W	L	PF	PA	PD	Pts	Qualification
1	Lithuania	5	5	0	468	414	+54	10	Quarterfinals
2	Greece	5	3	2	389	343	+46	8 (Note: Head-to-head record: Greece 1–1 (1.10 GAvg), Puerto Rico 1–1 (0.99), United States 1–1 (0.92))	Quarterfinals
3	Puerto Rico	5	3	2	410	411	−1	8	Quarterfinals
4	United States	5	3	2	418	389	+29	8	Quarterfinals
5	Australia	5	1	4	383	411	−28	6	9th place playoff
6	Angola	5	0	5	321	421	−100	5	11th place playoff

Source: FIBA archive
Rules for classification: 1) points; 2) head-to-head points; 3) head-to-head goal average; 4) head-to-head number of points scored.
Notes:

All times are local (UTC+3)

15 August 2004
9:00

Angola	73–78	Lithuania
Scoring by quarter: 24–14, 8–14, 23–28, 18–22
Pts: Lutonda 17; Rebs: Lutonda 4 Asts: Lutonda 6		Pts: Lavrinovič, E. Žukauskas 15 each Rebs: E. Žukauskas 11; Asts: Jasikevičius 6

Helliniko Indoor Arena, Athens
Attendance: 400
Referees: Chantal Julien (FRA), Ma Li Jun (CHN)

15 August 2004
20:00

Boxscore

Puerto Rico	92–73	United States
Scoring by quarter: 21–20, 28–7, 16–21, 27–25
Pts: Arroyo 24; Rebs: Ortiz 6 Asts: Arroyo 7		Pts: Duncan, Iverson 15 each Rebs: Duncan 16; Asts: Duncan 4

Helliniko Indoor Arena, Athens
Attendance: 11,560
Referees:
Zoran Šutulović (Serbia and Montenegro)
Vicente Bulto (Spain)

15 August 2004
22:15

Greece	76–54	Australia
Scoring by quarter: 23–18, 12–15, 24–18, 17–3
Pts: Papadopoulos 21; Rebs: Papadopoulos 9 Asts: Papaloukas 4		Pts: Heal, Maher 12 each Rebs: Nielsen 6 Asts: Andersen, Heal 1 each

Helliniko Indoor Arena, Athens
Attendance: 11,500
Referees: Pablo Estevez (ARG), José Ronfini (MEX)

17 August 2004
11:15

Australia	83–59	Angola
Scoring by quarter: 21–13, 24–16, 27–15, 11–15
Pts: Heal 18; Rebs: Bogut 11; Asts: Smith 3		Pts: Monteiro 18; Rebs: Gomes 9 Asts: 4 players, 1 each

Helliniko Indoor Arena, Athens
Attendance: 2,400
Referees: Renato Santos (BRA), Vladimir Okhrimenko (RUS)

17 August 2004
14:30

Lithuania	98–90	Puerto Rico
Scoring by quarter: 26–32, 23–12, 22–22, 27–24
Pts: Šiškauskas 23; Rebs: E. Žukauskas 8 Asts: Jasikevičius 7		Pts: Arroyo, Ayuso 25 each Rebs: Hourruitiner 6 Asts: Arroyo, Ayuso 2 each

Helliniko Indoor Arena, Athens
Attendance: 12,500
Referees:
Pablo Estevez (Argentina)
Zoran Šutulović (Serbia and Montenegro)

17 August 2004
22:15

United States	77–71	Greece
Scoring by quarter: 18–17, 19–14, 20–22, 20–18
Pts: Iverson 17; Rebs: Duncan 9 Asts: Marbury 6		Pts: Fotsis 22; Rebs: Papadopoulos 7 Asts: Papaloukas 6

Helliniko Indoor Arena, Athens
Attendance: 12,000
Referees:
Reynaldo Sanchez (Dominican Republic)
Vicente Bulto (Spain)

19 August 2004
14:30

United States	89–79	Australia
Scoring by quarter: 21–31, 26–20, 18–16, 24–12
Pts: Duncan 18; Rebs: Duncan 11; Asts: James, Marbury 5 each		Pts: Heal 17; Rebs: Andersen, Bogut 8 Asts: Heal 7

Helliniko Indoor Arena, Athens
Attendance: 12,000
Referees: José Ronfini (MEX), Giampaolo Cicoria (ITA)

19 August 2004
16:45

Puerto Rico	83–80	Angola
Scoring by quarter: 19–17, 18–15, 26–34, 20–14
Pts: Ayuso 17; Rebs: Santiago 10; Asts: Arroyo 6		Pts: de Carvalho 14; Rebs: Moussa 6 Asts: Costa 7

Helliniko Indoor Arena, Athens
Attendance: 12,000
Referees: Reynaldo Sanchez (DOM), Ma Li Jun (CHN)

19 August 2004
22:15

Greece	76–98	Lithuania
Scoring by quarter: 10–28, 15–26, 19–22, 32–22
Pts: Zisis 18; Rebs: Papanikolaou 7 Asts: Papaloukas 3		Pts: Šiškauskas 25; Rebs: Javtokas, Songaila 5 each Asts: Jasikevičius 8

Helliniko Indoor Arena, Athens
Attendance: 12,000
Referees:
Renato Santos (Brazil)
Pablo Estevez (Argentina)

21 August 2004
9:00

Australia	82–87	Puerto Rico
Scoring by quarter: 23–13, 28–28, 17–24, 14–22
Pts: Nielsen 20; Rebs: Bogut 11; Asts: Heal 6		Pts: Santiago 20; Rebs: Ortiz 6 Asts: Arroyo 7

Helliniko Indoor Arena, Athens
Attendance: 6,500
Referees: Vicente Bulto (ESP), Pablo Estevez (ARG)

21 August 2004
20:00

Lithuania	94–90	United States
Scoring by quarter: 23–26, 21–23, 23–20, 27–21
Pts: Jasikevičius 28; Rebs: Štombergas 10; Asts: Jasikevičius 4		Pts: Jefferson 20; Rebs: Duncan 20; Asts: Marbury 3

Helliniko Indoor Arena, Athens
Attendance: 12,000
Referees:
Reynaldo Sanchez (Dominican Republic)
Zoran Šutulović (Serbia and Montenegro)

21 August 2004
22:15

Angola	56–88	Greece
Scoring by quarter: 15–23, 10–20, 10–24, 21–21
Pts: Costa 12; Rebs: Costa 5 Asts: 5 players, 1 each		Pts: Dikoudis 15; Rebs: Dikoudis, Papadopoulos 8 each Asts: Diamantidis 3

Helliniko Indoor Arena, Athens
Attendance: 12,000
Referees: Mike Homsy (CAN), Alejandro Chiti (ARG)

23 August 2004
11:15

Lithuania	100–85	Australia
Scoring by quarter: 20–19, 32–9, 23–38, 25–19
Pts: Javtokas 23; Rebs: Javtokas 9 Asts: Jasikevičius 4		Pts: Bogut, Saville 21 each Rebs: Bogut 9 Asts: Heal 3

Helliniko Indoor Arena, Athens
Attendance: 7,650
Referees: Vicente Bulto (ESP), Alejandro Chiti (ARG)

23 August 2004
14:30

United States	89–53	Angola
Scoring by quarter: 23–14, 23–12, 29–13, 14–14
Pts: Duncan 15; Rebs: Boozer 9 Asts: James 5		Pts: Monteiro 20; Rebs: Gomes 6 Asts: Monteiro, Moussa 2 each

Helliniko Indoor Arena, Athens
Attendance: 12,000
Referees: Pablo Estevez (ARG), Philippe Leemann (SUI)

23 August 2004
22:15

Greece	78–58	Puerto Rico
Scoring by quarter: 20–22, 20–6, 16–18, 22–12
Pts: Kakiouzis 16; Rebs: Dikoudis 8 Asts: Papaloukas 4		Pts: Ayuso 11; Rebs: Fajardo 9 Asts: Arroyo 4

Helliniko Indoor Arena, Athens
Attendance: 12,000
Referees:
José Ronfini (Mexico)
Scott Buttler (Australia)

== Classification games ==
All times are local (UTC+3)

24 August 2004
14:30

11th place

Serbia and Montenegro	85–62	Angola
Scoring by quarter: 18–10, 16–15, 27–19, 24–18
Pts: Šćepanović 18; Rebs: Krstić 12; Asts: Šćepanović 4		Pts: Monteiro 26; Rebs: Moussa 7 Asts: Almeida, Monteiro 2 each

Helliniko Indoor Arena, Athens
Attendance: 3,625
Referees: Vicente Bulto (ESP), Alejandro Chiti (ARG)

24 August 2004
16:45

9th place

New Zealand	80–98	Australia
Scoring by quarter: 15–28, 19–20, 18–26, 28–24
Pts: Jones 26; Rebs: Marks 6 Asts: Dickel 3		Pts: Heal 30; Rebs: Bogut 10; Asts: 3 players, 3 each

Helliniko Indoor Arena, Athens
Attendance: 4,250
Referees: Zoran Šutulović (SCG), Vladimir Okhrimenko (RUS)

28 August 2004
9:00

7th place

China	76–92	Spain
Scoring by quarter: 21–25, 11–17, 18–23, 26–27
Pts: Li Nan 16; Rebs: Yao Ming 7 Asts: Yao Ming 3		Pts: Gasol 37; Rebs: Gasol 7 Asts: Calderón 6

Olympic Indoor Hall, Athens
Attendance: 8,200
Referees:
Alejandro Chiti (Argentina)
Virginijus Dovidavicius (Lithuania)

28 August 2004
11:15

5th place

Puerto Rico	75–85	Greece
Scoring by quarter: 15–25, 21–19, 20–22, 19–19
Pts: Ayuso 14; Rebs: Santiago 9 Asts: Arroyo 4		Pts: Kakiouzis 20; Rebs: Diamantidis 8 Asts: 3 players, 3 each

Olympic Indoor Hall, Athens
Attendance: 14,500
Referees:
Mike Homsy (Canada)
Michael Aylen (Australia)

== Knockout stage ==
Quarterfinals
A1	Spain	94
B4	United States	102
A3	Argentina	69
B2	Greece	64
B1	Lithuania	95
A4	China	75
A2	Italy	83
B3	Puerto Rico	70

Semifinals
B4	United States	81
A3	Argentina	89
B1	Lithuania	91
A2	Italy	100

Gold medal game
A3	Argentina	84
A2	Italy	69
Bronze medal game
B4	United States	104
B1	Lithuania	96

=== Quarterfinals ===
In spite of an undefeated preliminary round, the Spaniards were defeated by the United States (3–2 in group play) to the chagrin of Spanish head coach Mario Pesquera.

Unlike their Spanish counterparts, however, the Lithuanians had an easy time disposing of the Del Harris-led Chinese squad.

Argentina, led by 13 points from both Manu Ginóbili and Fabricio Oberto, disposed of the home squad, led by the 12 points from Nikos Chatzivrettas.

All times are local (UTC+3)

26 August 2004
14:30

Spain	94–102	United States
Scoring by quarter: 25–25, 18–19, 24–30, 27–28
Pts: Gasol 29; Rebs: Calderón 7 Asts: 3 players, 1 each		Pts: Marbury 31; Rebs: Marion, Odom 6 each Asts: Iverson, Marbury 4 each

Olympic Indoor Hall, Athens
Attendance: 14,500
Referees:
José Ronfini (Mexico)
Michael Aylen (Australia)

26 August 2004
16:45

Lithuania	95–75	China
Scoring by quarter: 25–19, 28–18, 21–20, 21–18
Pts: Macijauskas 32; Rebs: E. Žukauskas 8 Asts: Šiškauskas 4		Pts: Yao Ming 29; Rebs: Yao Ming 11; Asts: Liu Wei 4

Olympic Indoor Hall, Athens
Attendance: 14,500
Referees: Mike Homsy (CAN), Christos Christodoulou (GRE)

26 August 2004
20:00

Italy	83–70	Puerto Rico
Scoring by quarter: 23–20, 18–15, 19–17, 23–18
Pts: Bulleri 20; Rebs: Marconato 12; Asts: Pozzecco 6		Pts: Ayuso 24; Rebs: Ortiz 8 Asts: Arroyo 5

Olympic Indoor Hall, Athens
Attendance: 14,500
Referees:
Vicente Bulto (Spain)
Alejandro Chiti (Argentina)

26 August 2004
22:15

Greece	64–69	Argentina
Scoring by quarter: 14–22, 21–7, 18–24, 11–16
Pts: Hatzivrettas 12; Rebs: Dikoudis, Papadopoulos 9 each Asts: Diamantidis 3		Pts: Ginóbili, Oberto 13 each Rebs: Herrmann 6 Asts: Ginóbili, Montecchia 2 each

Olympic Indoor Hall, Athens
Attendance: 14,500
Referees: Renato Santos (BRA), Giampaolo Cicoria (ITA)

=== Semifinals ===
The United States was defeated by Argentina, suffering its third loss of the tournament, the most losses ever by the U.S. men's Olympic basketball team. Following the loss to Argentina, it was the first U.S. team to fail to win a gold medal since the 1988 Olympics. The United States would not lose three games in a major tournament again until the 2023 FIBA World Cup.

All times are local (UTC+3)

27 August 2004
20:00

Argentina	89–81	United States
Scoring by quarter: 24–20, 19–18, 27–19, 19–24
Pts: Ginóbili 29; Rebs: Oberto 6 Asts: Sánchez 7		Pts: Marbury 18; Rebs: Boozer 9 Asts: Iverson, Odom 3 each

Olympic Indoor Hall, Athens
Attendance: 14,500
Referees: Vicente Bulto (ESP), Zoran Šutulović (SCG)

27 August 2004
22:15

Italy	100–91	Lithuania
Scoring by quarter: 20–26, 29–17, 24–20, 27–28
Pts: Basile 31; Rebs: Marconato 9 Asts: Marconato, Pozzecco 3 each		Pts: Macijauskas 26; Rebs: Šiškauskas 7 Asts: Jasikevičius 9

Olympic Indoor Hall, Athens
Attendance: 14,500
Referees:
Reynaldo Sanchez (Dominican Republic)
José Carrión (Puerto Rico)

=== Bronze medal game ===
The United States won its first bronze medal since 1988 by avenging the preliminary loss to Lithuania of one week earlier.

All times are local (UTC+3)

28 August 2004
20:45

Lithuania	96–104	United States
Scoring by quarter: 24–24, 20–25, 27–25, 25–30
Pts: Macijauskas 24; Rebs: Javtokas 6 Asts: Jasikevičius 4		Pts: Marion 22; Rebs: Boozer, Duncan 8 each Asts: Wade 6

Olympic Indoor Hall, Athens
Attendance: 14,500
Referees:
Pablo Estevez (Argentina)
Giampaolo Cicoria (Italy)

=== Gold medal game ===
Argentina won its first ever Olympic gold medal in basketball and became the first Latin and Hispanic nation to obtain an Olympic gold medal in men's basketball.

All times are local (UTC+3)

28 August 2004
22:45

Italy	69–84	Argentina
Scoring by quarter: 16–23, 25–20, 13–17, 15–24
Pts: Pozzecco, Soragna 12 each Rebs: Garri 6 Asts: Rombaldoni 2		Pts: Scola 25; Rebs: Scola 11; Asts: Ginóbili 6

Olympic Indoor Hall, Athens
Attendance: 14,500
Referees: Renato Santos (BRA), Lazaros Voreadis (GRE)

Team details

Italy	Argentina

SF	7	Matteo Soragna
PG	9	Gianmarco Pozzecco
SG	11	Rodolfo Rombaldoni
SG	5	Gianluca Basile
PF	6	Giacomo Galanda
C	8	Denis Marconato
PG	12	Massimo Bulleri
C	14	Roberto Chiacig
SF	10	Alex Righetti
C	15	Luca Garri
PF	4	Nikola Radulovic
Did not play:
SG	13	Michele Mian
Head Coach:
(Italy) Carlo Recalcati

PF	11	Luis Scola
PG	6	Alejandro Montecchia
SG	5	Manu Ginóbili
C	15	Rubén Wolkowyski
SF	13	Andrés Nocioni
PG	4	Pepe Sánchez
SG	10	Hugo Sconochini
PF	9	Gabriel Fernández
SF	14	Carlos Delfino
Did not play:
C	7	Fabricio Oberto
SF	8	Walter Herrmann
PF	12	Leonardo Gutiérrez
Head Coach:
(Argentina) Rubén Magnano

== Awards ==
MVP: (Argentina) Manu Ginóbili

2004 Olympic Basketball Champions

Argentina
1st title

== Statistical leaders ==
Top ten in points, rebounds and assists, and top 5 in steals and blocks.

=== Points ===
Name	PPG
(Spain) Pau Gasol	22.4
(New Zealand) Phill Jones	21.0
(China) Yao Ming	20.7
(Argentina) Manu Ginóbili	19.3
(Puerto Rico) Carlos Arroyo	19.3
(Puerto Rico) Elías Ayuso	18.8
(Argentina) Luis Scola	17.6
(Australia) Shane Heal	16.7
(Lithuania) Arvydas Macijauskas	15.9
(Italy) Gianluca Basile	14.6

=== Rebounds ===
Name	RPG
(China) Yao Ming	9.3
(Serbia and Montenegro) Dejan Tomašević	9.2
(United States) Tim Duncan	9.1
(Australia) Andrew Bogut	9.0
(Spain) Pau Gasol	7.3
(New Zealand) Sean Marks	7.0
(Greece) Lazaros Papadopoulos	6.5
(United States) Carlos Boozer	6.1
(United States) Shawn Marion	5.9
(United States) Lamar Odom	5.8

=== Assists ===
Name	APG
(Lithuania) Šarūnas Jasikevičius	5.6
(Puerto Rico) Carlos Arroyo	5.2
(New Zealand) Mark Dickel	4.5
(Italy) Gianmarco Pozzecco	4.3
(Australia) Shane Heal	3.5
(United States) Stephon Marbury	3.4
(Argentina) Manu Ginóbili	3.3
(Greece) Theodoros Papaloukas	3.0
(Greece) Dimitris Diamantidis	2.8
(Angola) Miguel Lutonda	2.7

=== Steals ===
Name	SPG
(Greece) Theodoros Papaloukas	2.8
(Puerto Rico) Carlos Arroyo	2.3
(United States) Dwyane Wade	2.1
(United States) Lamar Odom	2.0
(New Zealand) Dillon Boucher	1.8

=== Blocks ===
Name	BPG
(Spain) Pau Gasol	1.9
(United States) Tim Duncan	1.4
(Lithuania) Eurelijus Žukauskas	1.1
(Lithuania) Robertas Javtokas	1.0
(Australia) Andrew Bogut	1.0

=== Game highs ===
Department	Name	Total	Opponent
Points	(China) Yao Ming	39	New Zealand
Rebounds	(United States) Tim Duncan	16	Puerto Rico
Assists	(Italy) Gianmarco Pozzecco	12	China
Steals	(United States) Tim Duncan (Greece) Theodoros Papaloukas	5	Puerto Rico; Argentina
Blocks	(Spain) Pau Gasol	5	Argentina
Turnovers	(United States) Tim Duncan (Lithuania) Šarūnas Jasikevičius	7	Puerto Rico (both players)

== Final standings ==
Rank	Team	Pld	W	L
Gold medal game participants
1st place, gold medalist(s)	Argentina	8	6	2
2nd place, silver medalist(s)	Italy	8	5	3
Bronze medal game participants
3rd place, bronze medalist(s)	United States	8	5	3
4th	Lithuania	8	6	2
Eliminated at the quarterfinals
5th	Greece	7	4	3
6th	Puerto Rico	7	3	4
7th	Spain	7	6	1
8th	China	7	2	5
Preliminary round 5th placers
9th	Australia	6	2	4
10th	New Zealand	6	1	5
Preliminary round 6th placers
11th	Serbia and Montenegro	6	2	4
12th	Angola	6	0	6

== See also ==
- Women's Tournament
