= Michalis Kakiouzis =

Greek basketball player

Michalis Kakiouzis Μιχάλης Κακιούζης
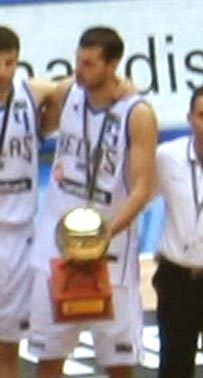
- Kakiouzis wearing #15

Peja
- Title: Head coach
- League: Kosovo Superleague; Liga Unike

Personal information
- Born: November 29, 1976 (age 49) Athens, Greece
- Listed height: 6 ft 9.5 in (2.07 m)
- Listed weight: 240 lb (109 kg)

Career information
- NBA draft: 1998: undrafted
- Playing career: 1992–2016
- Position: Power forward
- Number: 15
- Coaching career: 2018–present

Career history

Playing
- 1992–1995: Ionikos NF
- 1995–2002: AEK Athens
- 2002–2005: Montepaschi Siena
- 2005–2007: Barcelona
- 2007–2008: Sevilla
- 2008–2009: Efes Pilsen
- 2009–2010: Aris
- 2010–2011: Le Mans
- 2011: Vanoli Cremona
- 2011–2012: Virtus Roma
- 2012–2013: SAV Vacallo Basket
- 2013: AEK Larnaca
- 2013–2015: Nea Kifissia
- 2015: APOEL
- 2015–2016: Faros Keratsiniou

Coaching
- 2018–2019: Koropi
- 2019–2021: Enosis Neon Paralimni
- 2021–2022: SCM U Craiova
- 2022–2025: Keravnos
- 2025–2026: Prishtina
- 2026–present: Peja

Career highlights
- As a player: FIBA EuroStar (2007); FIBA Saporta Cup champion (2000); Spanish Cup winner (2007); Italian League champion (2004); Italian Supercup winner (2004); Italian League All-Star (2005); Greek League champion (2002); 2× Greek Cup winner (2000, 2001); 2× Greek League All-Star (1999, 2002); Turkish League champion (2009); Turkish Cup winner (2009); Cypriot League champion (2013); As a head coach: 2x Cypriot League champion (2022, 2024); 2x Cypriot Cup winner (2022, 2024); 2x Cypriot Super Cup winner (2022, 2023)
Medals
Event	1st	2nd	3rd
FIBA World Cup	0	1	0
FIBA Stanković World Cup	1	0	0
FIBA EuroBasket	1	0	0
FIBA U-19 World Cup	1	0	0
FIBA U-16 European Championship	0	1	0
Total	3	2	0
Men's basketball
Representing Greece
FIBA World Cup
Silver medal – second place	2006 Japan	
FIBA Stanković World Cup
Gold medal – first place	2006 China	
FIBA EuroBasket
Gold medal – first place	2005 Serbia & Montenegro	
FIBA U19 World Cup
Gold medal – first place	1995 Greece	Under-19 Team
FIBA Europe U16 Championship
Silver medal – second place	1991 Greece	Under-16 Team

Michalis "Mika" Kakiouzis (alternate spellings: Michail, Michailis, Mihalis) (Greek: Μιχάλης Κακιούζης; born November 29, 1976) is a Greek former professional basketball player and coach. He is currently working as the head coach for Peja of the Kosovo Basketball Superleague. During his playing career, at a height of 2.07 m (6 ft. 9 1/2 in.) tall, Kakiouzis played the power forward position.

== Early years ==
Kakiouzis began playing basketball at the age of 8, with the youth team academies of Ionikos NF, in Greece.

== Professional career ==
Kakiouzis made his debut with the Ionikos N.F. senior club in the 1992–93 season. He played three seasons in the Greek 2nd Division. At the age of 18, he became the 2nd scorer and rebounder of the Greek 2nd Division.

He was in the squad that brought Greece the gold medal at the 1995 FIBA Under-19 World Cup for junior men. This was a stepping stone for his journey toward AEK Athens, as his performance at the 1995 Junior World Cup with Greece got him a contract with AEK, one of the powers of the top Greek League.

Kakiouzis had a fruitful stay at AEK Athens. While with the club, he won a Greek League championship in the 2001–02 season, and he also won two Greek Cups, in the years 2000 and 2001. He also won the Saporta Cup with AEK, in the year 2000.

After leaving AEK Athens in the year 2002, Kakiouzis went on to play for Montepaschi Siena in Italy. With Siena, he won both the Italian League championship and the Italian Supercup in the 2003–04 season. He was also named to the All-Italian League Team for the season by the Eurobasket.com website.

In 2005, Kakiouzis left Siena and joined Barcelona Basquet of the Spanish League. He stayed with Barcelona until his contract expired in 2007. He then joined the Spanish League club Sevilla.

Kakiouzis signed with the Turkish League club Efes in 2008. On August 27, 2009, he returned to the Greek League and signed with Aris Thessaloniki. In 2011, he signed with Vanoli Basket to help the team to avoid relegation.

In January 2012, he signed with the Italian League club Virtus Roma. In October 2012, he signed with SAV Vacallo Basket of the Swiss League. In 2013, he played for the Cypriot League club AEK Larnaca. In the summer of 2013, he participated in the training camp of Olympiacos. He then joined the Greek club AENK in 2013. On 19 January 2015, after averaging 9 points and 6 rebounds, he left AENK.

On 23 January 2015, Kakiouzis moved to Cyprus and signed a contract with APOEL. He joined the Greek 2nd Division club, Faros Keratsiniou, for the 2015–16 season.

On 4 January 2016, he announced that his retirement as a player would come at the end of the 2015–16 season.

== National team career ==
=== Greek junior national team ===
At the age of 15, Kakiouzis became a player of the national junior teams of Greece. With the Greek junior national team, he won the gold medal at the 1993 FIBA Europe Under-16 Championship. He was also on the Greek national junior squad that brought Greece the gold medal at the 1995 FIBA Under-19 World Cup for junior men. He would later go on to be a key member on Greece's senior national team as well.

=== Greek senior national team ===
Kakiouzis was the captain of the senior men's Greek national basketball team. He was a member of the Greek team that won the gold medal at the 2005 EuroBasket, and was also a member of Greece's silver medal winning team at the 2006 FIBA World Championship. Kakiouzis was on Greece's team that competed at the 2004 Summer Olympic Games, which was held in Athens. He also competed with Greece's senior team at the 1999 EuroBasket, 2001 EuroBasket, 2003 EuroBasket, and the 2007 EuroBasket.

== Coaching career ==
After he retired from playing professional club basketball, Kakiouzis became the lead scout of the Greek club AEK Athens. In 2018, he began a career working as a basketball coach. On April 7, 2022, Kakiouzis signed with Keravnos of the Cypriot Division A, to be the club's head coach.

== Awards and achievements ==
=== Pro clubs ===
- 2× Greek League All-Star: (1999, 2002)
- 2× Greek Cup Winner: (2000, 2001)
- FIBA Saporta Cup Champion: (2000)
- Greek League Champion: (2002)
- Italian League Champion: (2004)
- Italian Supercup Winner: (2004)
- Italian League All-Star: (2005)
- Spanish Cup Winner: (2007)
- Turkish Cup Winner: (2009)
- Turkish League Champion: (2009)
- Cypriot League Champion: (2013)

=== Greek junior national team ===
- 1993 FIBA Europe Under-16 Championship: Gold
- 1995 FIBA Under-19 World Cup: Gold

=== Greek senior national team ===
- 3× Acropolis Tournament Champion: (2005, 2006, 2007)
- 2005 EuroBasket: Gold
- 2006 FIBA Stanković World Cup: Gold
- 2006 FIBA World Championship: Silver
- FIBA EuroStar: (2007)

=== Head coach ===
- Cypriot League champion: (2022, 2024)
- Cypriot Cup winner: (2022)
- Cypriot Super Cup winner: (2022)
