= Matt Shanahan =

Matt Shanahan may refer to:

- Matt Shanahan (basketball)
- Matt Shanahan (politician)
