= Georgios Karagkoutis =

Greek basketball player

Georgios Karagkoutis Γιώργος Καράγκουτης
Personal information
- Born: February 15, 1976 (age 50) Athens, Greece
- Listed height: 6 ft 10 in (2.08 m)
- Listed weight: 240 lb (109 kg)

Career information
- Playing career: 1994–2007
- Position: Small forward / power forward
- Number: 15

Career history
- 1994–1999: Panionios
- 1999–2000: Panathinaikos
- 2000–2002: Iraklis
- 2002–2003: Near East
- 2003–2007: Maroussi

Career highlights
- EuroLeague champion (2000); Greek League champion (2000); Greek League All-Star (1996 I)
Medals
Men's basketball
Representing Greece
FIBA Europe Under-16 Championship
Gold medal – first place	1993 Turkey	Under-16
FIBA Under-19 World Cup
Gold medal – first place	1995 Greece	Under-19

Georgios Karagkoutis (alternate spellings: Giorgos, Karagoutis) (Greek: Γιώργος Καράγκουτης) (born February 15, 1976, in Greece), is a retired Greek professional basketball player. At a height of 2.08 m (6 ft. 10 in.) tall, he could play at both the small forward and power forward positions.

== Professional career ==
Karagkoutis started his career with the Greek club Panionios, at the age of 16. He was a Greek Cup finalist in 1995, and in 1998, he was a FIBA Korać Cup semifinalist with Panionios.

In 1999, Karagkoutis moved to Panathinaikos, and he won the EuroLeague championship with the club in 2000. In the subsequent years, he played with Iraklis (2000–01), Near East (2001–02), and Maroussi. With Maroussi, he finished in second place in the regular season of the Greek League, and he was also a Greek Cup finalist with Maroussi in 2006.

== National team career ==
With the Greek Under-16 junior national team, Karagkoutis won the gold medal at the 1993 FIBA Europe Under-16 Championship. With the Greek Under-19 junior national team, Karagkoutis also won the gold medal at the 1995 FIBA Under-19 World Cup.

Karagkoutis also played with the senior men's Greek national team at the 1998 FIBA World Championship, where Greece finished in 4th place, and at the 1999 FIBA EuroBasket, where Greece also finished in 4th place. He represented Greece 25 times at the senior level, and scored a total of 100 points.

== Coaching career ==
After concluding his playing career, Karagkoutis moved with his wife and two children to Dafnoudi, his wife's hometown, where he became a youth coach for the amateur club Ethnikos Neou Skopou.
