= Efthimios Rentzias =

Greek basketball player

Efthimios Rentzias Ευθύμιος Ρεντζιάς
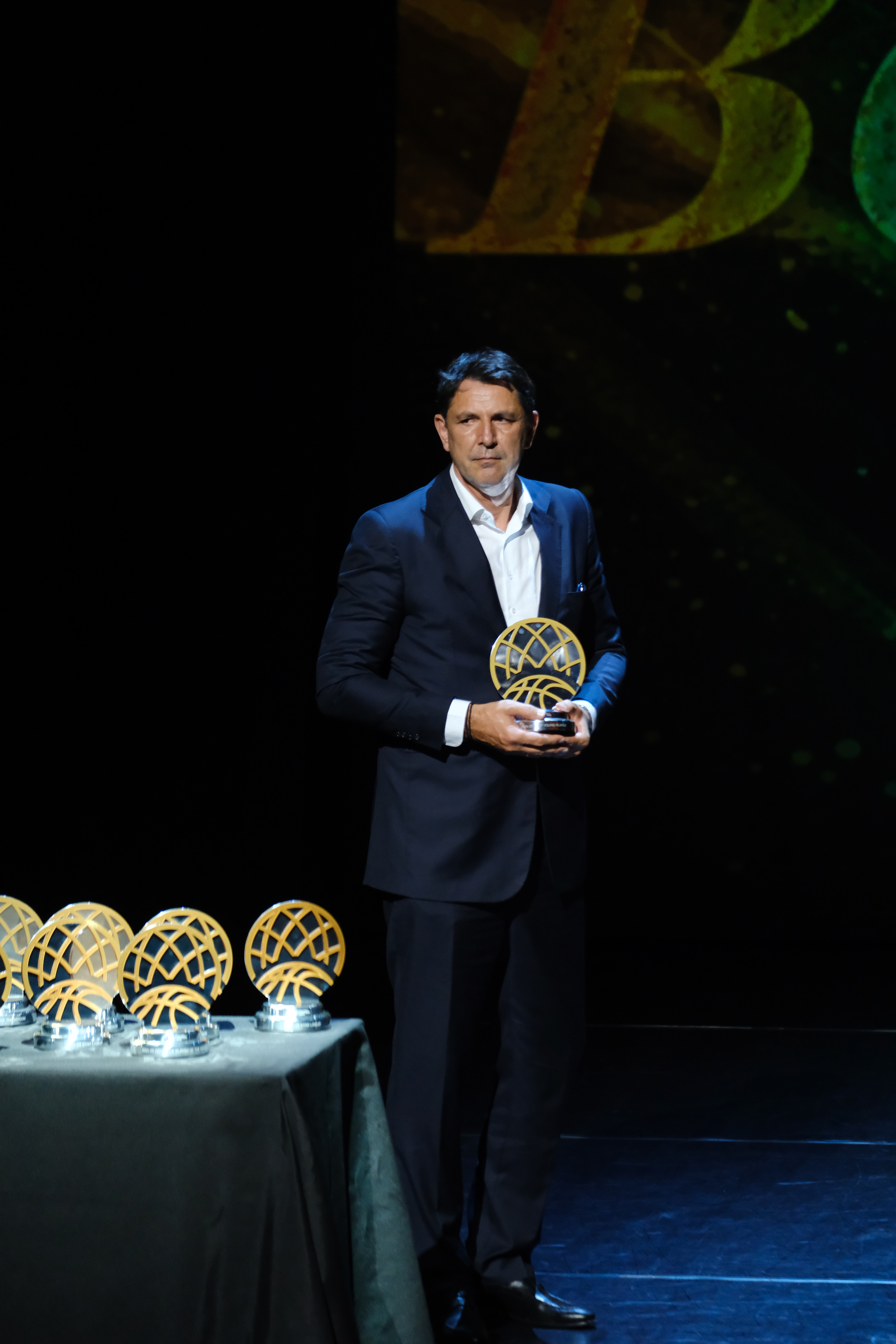

Personal information
- Born: January 11, 1976 (age 50) Trikala, Greece
- Listed height: 6 ft 11 in (2.11 m)
- Listed weight: 260 lb (118 kg)

Career information
- NBA draft: 1996: 1st round, 23rd overall pick
- Drafted by: Denver Nuggets
- Playing career: 1993–2006
- Position: Center
- Number: 14, 8, 20

Career history
- 1993–1997: PAOK Thessaloniki
- 1997–2002: FC Barcelona
- 2002–2003: Philadelphia 76ers
- 2003–2004: Ülkerspor
- 2004–2005: Montepaschi Siena
- 2005–2006: Forum Valladolid

Career highlights
- 2× FIBA Korać Cup champion (1994, 1999); 2× Spanish League champion (1999, 2001); Spanish Cup winner (2001); Italian Supercup winner (2004); Greek Cup winner (1995); 2× Greek League All-Star (1996 I, 1996 II); Greek League Hall of Fame (2022); Turkish Cup winner (2004); Turkish Supercup winner (2003); FIBA Under-19 World Cup MVP (1995); Acropolis Tournament MVP (1998)
- Stats at NBA.com
- Stats at Basketball Reference
Medals
Men's basketball
Representing Greece
FIBA Under-19 World Cup
Gold medal – first place	1995 Greece	Under-19
FIBA Europe Under-16 Championship
Gold medal – first place	1993 Turkey	Under-16
Silver medal – second place	1991 Greece	Under-16

Efthimios Rentzias (alternate spellings: Efthymios, Efthymis; Greek: Ευθύμιος "Ευθύμης" Ρεντζιάς; born January 11, 1976) is a retired Greek professional basketball player. During his pro club career, he was most notably a member of the Spanish League's FC Barcelona, and the NBA's Philadelphia 76ers. At a height of 2.12 m (6'11 1/2") tall, he played at the center position. He was inducted into the Greek Basket League Hall of Fame in 2022.

== Professional career ==
=== Europe ===
Rentzias played his first club basketball with the amateur youth teams of Danaos Trikalon, a local team from Trikala, Greece. After that, he began his professional club career at the age of 17, with PAOK Thessaloniki of the Greek League, in the 1993–94 season. With PAOK, he won the championship of the now defunct European-wide third-level competition, the FIBA Korać Cup, in the 1993–94 season, and the Greek Cup title, in the 1994–95 season.

He later transferred to the Spanish ACB League club Barcelona Bàsquet, for the 1997–98 season. With Barcelona, Rentzias won his second FIBA Korać Cup championship, in the 1998–99 season. With Barcelona, he also won 2 Spanish League championships, in the 1998–99 and 2000–01 seasons. In his last year with Barcelona (2001–02), Rentzias averaged 9.2 points and 3.5 rebounds, in 17.3 minutes per game, in 51 games played, in both the Spanish League (ACB) and in Europe's premier club basketball competition, the EuroLeague. He shot 61.6 percent from the field, 36.3 percent from three-point range, and 71.4 percent from the foul line.

=== NBA ===
Rentzias was selected with the 23rd overall pick by the Denver Nuggets, in the 1996 NBA draft, while still under contract with PAOK. Rentzias opted not to play in the NBA at that time. On 29 September 1997, Rentzias' player draft rights were traded by the Denver Nuggets, along with a future 2000 2nd-round draft pick (Hanno Möttölä was later selected), to the Atlanta Hawks, in exchange for Priest Lauderdale. On 26 June 2002, Rentzias was traded by the Atlanta Hawks, to the Philadelphia 76ers, in exchange for a future 2004 2nd-round draft pick (Royal Ivey was later selected), and a future 2006 2nd-round draft pick (Daniel Gibson was later selected).

Rentzias then played in the NBA, with the 76ers, during the 2002–03 season. He played in 35 regular season games, and averaged 1.5 points per game. At that time, he was just the second Greek-born basketball player to have played for an NBA team. On 8 August 2003, Renztias was waived by the 76ers.

=== Return to Europe ===
After leaving the NBA, Rentzias subsequently played with Ülkerspor, of the Turkish Super League, Montepaschi Siena, of the Italian A League, and Forum Valladolid, of the Spanish ACB League. Rentzias had plans to come back to PAOK, where he wanted to finish his playing career. Unfortunately, in August 2006, he announced his retirement from playing pro club basketball at the age of 30, because of injury problems.

== National team career ==
=== Greek junior national team ===
Rentzias was a part of the Greek junior national basketball teams. With Greece's junior national teams, he won the silver medal at the 1991 FIBA Europe Under-16 Championship and the gold medal at the 1993 FIBA Europe Under-16 Championship. Rentzias was named the MVP of the 1995 FIBA Under-19 World Cup, after he helped Greece to win the tournament's gold medal, scoring 33 points and grabbing 21 rebounds in the final against Australia. In the process, Greece beat (by a score of 98–78) an Under-19 U.S.A. Team that featured future NBA players like Vince Carter, Trajan Langdon, Stephon Marbury, and Samaki Walker. During that period of time, Rentzias was considered to be one of the most talented young European basketball players.

=== Greek senior national team ===
Rentzias was also a member of the senior men's Greek national team, from 1992 to 2003, and with Greece, he competed at the 1996 Atlanta Summer Olympic Games. At that time, that was the just the second ever appearance by Greece's senior men's basketball team in a Summer Olympic Games, and their first since the 1952 Helsinki Summer Olympic Games. He averaged 5.0 points and 4.1 rebounds, in 12 minutes per game, over seven games played in the 1996 Olympic Games tournament.

He also played with Greece at the following major FIBA tournaments: the 1994 FIBA World Championship, the 1995 FIBA EuroBasket, the 1997 FIBA EuroBasket, the 1998 FIBA World Championship, the 2001 FIBA EuroBasket, and the 2003 FIBA EuroBasket. On an individual level, Rentzias was the MVP of the Acropolis Tournament in 1998.

== NBA career statistics ==
Legend
GP	Games played	GS	Games started	MPG	Minutes per game
FG%	Field goal percentage	3P%	3-point field goal percentage	FT%	Free throw percentage
RPG	Rebounds per game	APG	Assists per game	SPG	Steals per game
BPG	Blocks per game	PPG	Points per game	**Bold**	Career high
†	Won an NBA championship	*	Led the league

=== Regular season ===
Year	Team	GP	GS	MPG	FG%	3P%	FT%	RPG	APG	SPG	BPG	PPG
2002–03	Philadelphia	35	0	4.1	33.9	50.0	88.9	0.7	0.2	0.2	0.1	1.5
Career		35	0	4.1	33.9	50.0	88.9	0.7	0.2	0.2	0.1	1.5

.

== Awards and accomplishments ==
=== Pro career ===
- 2× FIBA Korać Cup Champion: (1994, 1999)
- Greek Cup Winner: (1995)
- 2× Greek League All-Star (1996 I, 1996 II)
- 2× Spanish League Champion: (1999, 2001)
- Spanish Cup Winner: (2001)
- Turkish Supercup Winner: (2003)
- Turkish Cup Winner: (2004)
- Italian Supercup Winner: (2004)
- Greek League Hall of Fame: (2022)

=== Greek junior national team ===
- 1991 FIBA Europe Under-16 Championship: Silver
- 1993 FIBA Europe Under-16 Championship: Gold
- 1995 FIBA Under-19 World Cup: Gold
- 1995 FIBA Under-19 World Cup: All-Tournament Team
- 1995 FIBA Under-19 World Cup: MVP

=== Greek senior national team ===
- Acropolis Tournament MVP: (1998)
