= EuroBasket 2003 =

International basketball event

Europamästerskapet i basket för herrar 2003
- Official logo of the EuroBasket 2003

Tournament details
- Host country: Sweden
- Dates: 5–14 September
- Teams: 16
- Venues: 5 (in 5 host cities)

Final positions
- Champions: Lithuania (3rd title)
- Runners-up: Spain
- Third place: Italy
- Fourth place: France

Tournament statistics
- Games played: 40
- MVP: (Lithuania) Šarūnas Jasikevičius
- Top scorer: (Spain) Pau Gasol (25.8 points per game)

The 2003 FIBA European Championship, commonly called FIBA EuroBasket 2003, was the 33rd FIBA EuroBasket regional basketball championship held by FIBA Europe, which also served as the Europe qualifier for the 2004 Summer Olympics, giving a berth to the top three teams in the final standings. It was held in Sweden between 5 September and 14 September 2003. Sixteen national teams entered the event under the auspices of FIBA Europe, the sport's regional governing body. The cities of Borås, Luleå, Norrköping, Södertälje and Stockholm hosted the tournament. Lithuania won its third FIBA European title by defeating Spain with a 93–84 score in the final. Lithuania's Šarūnas Jasikevičius was voted the tournament's MVP.

== Venues ==
Location	Picture	City	Arena	Capacity	Status	Round
EuroBasket 2003 is located in Sweden		Borås	Boråshallen	3,000	Opened in 1957	Group D
EuroBasket 2003 is located in Sweden		Luleå	Coop Norrbotten Arena	6,500	Opened in 1970	Group A
EuroBasket 2003 is located in Sweden		Norrköping	Himmelstalundshallen	4,280	Opened in 1977	Group B
EuroBasket 2003 is located in Sweden		Södertälje	Scaniarinken	7,250	Opened in 1970	Group C
EuroBasket 2003 is located in Sweden		Stockholm	Stockholm Globe Arena	7,250	Opened in 1989	Knockout stages

== Qualification ==
Competition	Date	Vacancies	Qualified
Host nation	–	1	Sweden
Champions of 2002 FIBA World Championship	29 August – 8 September 2002	1	Serbia and Montenegro
Qualified through Qualifying Round	21 November 2001 – 25 January 2003	14	Bosnia and Herzegovina; Croatia; France; Germany; Greece; Israel; Italy; Latvia; Lithuania; Russia; Slovenia; Spain; Turkey; Ukraine

Group A	Group B	Group C	Group D
Bosnia and Herzegovina; France; Italy; Slovenia	Germany; Israel; Latvia; Lithuania	Russia; Serbia and Montenegro; Spain; Sweden	Croatia; Greece; Turkey; Ukraine

== Format ==
- The teams were split in four groups of four teams each where they played a round robin. The first team from each group qualified directly to the knockout stage. To define the other four teams that advanced to the knockout stage, second and third-placed teams from each group where cross-paired (2A vs. 3B, 3A vs. 2B, 2C vs. 3D, 3C vs. 2D) and the winner from each match advanced to the knockout stage.
- In the knockout quarterfinals, the winners advanced to the semifinals. The winners from the semifinals competed for the championship in the final, while the losing teams play a consolation game for the third place.
- The losing teams from the quarterfinals play in a separate bracket to define 5th through 8th place in the final standings.

== Squads ==
At the start of tournament, all 16 participating countries had 12 players on their roster.

== Preliminary round ==
Qualified for the quarterfinals
Qualified for the second round

Times given below are in Central European Summer Time (UTC+2).

=== Group A ===
Team	Pld	W	L	PF	PA	PD	Pts
France	3	3	0	271	210	+61	6
Slovenia	3	2	1	232	217	+15	5
Italy	3	1	2	199	234	−35	4
Bosnia and Herzegovina	3	0	3	210	251	−41	3

September 5
18:00

Boxscore

Slovenia	77–67	Italy
Scoring by quarter: 18–14, 18–20, 21–18, 20–15

Coop Arena, Luleå
Attendance: 1,813
Referees: Memduh Öget (TUR), Volodymyr Drabikovskyi (UKR)

September 5
21:00

Boxscore

France	98–76	Bosnia and Herzegovina
Scoring by quarter: 29–22, 18–22, 27–15, 24–17

Coop Arena, Luleå
Attendance: 1,541
Referees: Ilija Belošević (SRB), Oscar Lefwerth (SWE)

September 6
16:00

Boxscore

Bosnia and Herzegovina	62–73	Slovenia
Scoring by quarter: 23–24, 12–13, 19–11, 8–25

Coop Arena, Luleå
Attendance: 2,083
Referees: Volodymyr Drabikovskyi (UKR), Oscar Lefwerth (SWE)

September 6
18:30

Boxscore

Italy	52–85	France
Scoring by quarter: 18–21, 9–18, 14–22, 11–24

Coop Arena, Luleå
Attendance: 2,504
Referees: Ilija Belošević (SRB), Fedor Dmitriev (BLR)

September 7
15:15

Boxscore

Slovenia	82–88	France
Scoring by quarter: 24–19, 18–21, 22–20, 18–28

Coop Arena, Luleå
Attendance: 1,552
Referees: Memduh Öget (TUR), Fedor Dmitriev (BLR)

September 7
18:15

Boxscore

Bosnia and Herzegovina	72–80	Italy
Scoring by quarter: 23–23, 20–18, 12–20, 17–19

Coop Arena, Luleå
Attendance: 1,652
Referees: Ilija Belošević (SRB), Volodymyr Drabikovskyi (UKR)

=== Group B ===
Team	Pld	W	L	PF	PA	PD	Pts
Lithuania	3	3	0	279	224	+55	6
Germany	3	2	1	251	260	−9	5
Israel	3	1	2	234	255	−21	4
Latvia	3	0	3	252	277	−25	3

5 September
18:00

Boxscore

Lithuania	92–91 (OT)	Latvia
Scoring by quarter: 14–23, 20–17, 24–18, 23–23, Overtime: 11–10
Pts: Macijauskas 22; Rebs: E. Žukauskas 8 Asts: Jasikevičius 8		Pts: Štelmahers 22; Rebs: Kambala 8 Asts: Štelmahers 4

Himmelstalundshallen, Norrköping
Attendance: 2,940
Referees: Miguel Betancor (ESP), Tonči Anzulović (CRO)

September 5
15:15

Boxscore

Germany	86–81	Israel
Scoring by quarter: 23–15, 22–23, 19–13, 22–30
Pts: Nowitzki, Okulaja 17; Rebs: Okulaja 10; Asts: Demirel 4		Pts: Tapiro 21; Rebs: Tapiro 6 Asts: Burstein, Halperin 2

Himmelstalundshallen, Norrköping
Attendance: 2,444
Referees: Lazaros Voreadis (GRE), Vladimir Okhrimenko (RUS)

September 6
17:00

Boxscore

Israel	62–94	Lithuania
Scoring by quarter: 19–23, 6–17, 18–28, 19–26
Pts: Green 12; Rebs: Kozikaro, Saffar 4 Asts: Tapiro 2		Pts: Štombergas 16; Rebs: Praškevičius, Slanina 6 Asts: Jasikevičius 5

Himmelstalundshallen, Norrköping
Attendance: 3,666
Referees: Lazaros Voreadis (GRE), Tonči Anzulović(CRO)

September 6
14:00

Boxscore

Latvia	86–94	Germany
Scoring by quarter: 14–27, 27–21, 21–22, 24–24
Pts: Bagatskis 18; Rebs: Kambala, Valters 6 Asts: Valters 4		Pts: Nowitzki 32; Rebs: Nowitzki 9 Asts: Demirel 4

Himmelstalundshallen, Norrköping
Attendance: 3,387
Referees: Miguel Betancor (ESP), Grzegorz Ziemblicki (POL)

September 7
15:15

Boxscore

Lithuania	93–71	Germany
Scoring by quarter: 22–19, 24–14, 30–20, 17–18
Pts: Štombergas 28; Rebs: E. Žukauskas 5 Asts: Jasikevičius 9		Pts: Nowitzki 19; Rebs: Nowitzki 9 Asts: Pesic 3

Himmelstalundshallen, Norrköping
Attendance: 3,569
Referees: Lazaros Voreadis (GRE), Vladimir Okhrimenko (RUS)

September 7
18:15

Boxscore

Israel	91–75	Latvia
Scoring by quarter: 29–14, 23–18, 20–21, 19–22
Pts: Burstein 21; Rebs: Burstein 8 Asts: Burstein 6		Pts: Ostlers 17; Rebs: Ostlers 6 Asts: Štelmahers 5

Himmelstalundshallen, Norrköping
Attendance: 3,850
Referees: Miguel Betancor (ESP), Grzegorz Ziemblicki (POL)

=== Group C ===
Team	Pld	W	L	PF	PA	PD	Pts
Spain	3	3	0	263	196	+67	6
Russia	3	2	1	264	240	+24	5
Serbia and Montenegro	3	1	2	225	238	−13	4
Sweden	3	0	3	191	269	−78	3

September 5
18:00

Boxscore

Serbia and Montenegro	80–95	Russia
Scoring by quarter: 25–25, 20–22, 17–22, 18–26
Pts: Drobnjak 18; Rebs: Drobnjak, Gurović 8 Asts: Jarić 5		Pts: Kirilenko 29; Rebs: Kirilenko 10; Asts: 6 Players 2

Scaniarinken, Södertälje
Attendance: 5,469
Referees: Luigi Lamonica (ITA), Stelian Banica (ROU)

September 5
21:00

Boxscore

Spain	99–52	Sweden
Scoring by quarter: 19–14, 25–10, 17–12, 38–16
Pts: Gasol 25; Rebs: F. Reyes 10; Asts: Marco 5		Pts: J. Larsson 15; Rebs: Nnamaka 8 Asts: Burke, J. Larsson 3

Scaniarinken, Södertälje
Attendance: 6,346
Referees: Bruno Gasperin (FRA), Ademir Zurapovic (BIH)

September 6
21:00

Boxscore

Sweden	68–78	Serbia and Montenegro
Scoring by quarter: 17–29, 19–11, 13–13, 19–25
Pts: Jonzen 18; Rebs: Jonzen 11; Asts: Burke 5		Pts: Stojaković 23; Rebs: Drobnjak 13; Asts: Jarić 7

Scaniarinken, Södertälje
Attendance: 6,956
Referees: Ademir Zurapovic (BIH), Stelian Banica (ROU)

September 6
18:00

Boxscore

Russia	77–89	Spain
Scoring by quarter: 18–31, 23–20, 11–17, 25–21
Pts: Kirilenko 26; Rebs: Khryapa 6 Asts: Khryapa 3		Pts: Gasol 35; Rebs: Gasol, Jiménez, F. Reyes 6 Asts: Marco 3

Scaniarinken, Södertälje
Referees: Bruno Gasperin (FRA), Roman Kolar (SLO)

September 7
15:45

Boxscore

Serbia and Montenegro	67–75	Spain
Scoring by quarter: 23–14, 15–18, 14–19, 15–24
Pts: Stojaković 25; Rebs: Drobnjak 6 Asts: Stojaković 3		Pts: Navarro 22; Rebs: Jiménez 8 Asts: Jiménez 4

Scaniarinken, Södertälje
Referees: Luigi Lamonica (ITA), Roman Kolar (SLO)

September 7
18:15

Boxscore

Sweden	71–92	Russia
Scoring by quarter: 27–29, 15–16, 12–25, 17–22
Pts: Jonzen 18; Rebs: Burke, Jonzen 5 Asts: Burke 5		Pts: Kirilenko 22; Rebs: Likholitov 9 Asts: Khryapa 4

Scaniarinken, Södertälje
Attendance: 6,037
Referees: Bruno Gasperin (FRA), Stelian Banica (ROU)

=== Group D ===
Team	Pld	W	L	PF	PA	PD	Pts
Greece	3	3	0	231	219	+12	6
Turkey	3	2	1	222	216	+6	5
Croatia	3	1	2	241	223	+18	4
Ukraine	3	0	3	213	249	−36	3

September 5
21:00

Boxscore

Greece	77–76	Croatia
Scoring by quarter: 22–26, 16–21, 16–14, 23–15
Pts: Chatzivrettas 14; Rebs: Tsakalidis 8 Asts: Diamantidis 3		Pts: Prkačin 18; Rebs: Giriček 8 Asts: Giriček 3

Boråshallen, Borås
Attendance: 2,123
Referees: Shmuel Bachar (ISR), Arnis Ozols (LAT)

September 5
18:00

Boxscore

Ukraine	69–77	Turkey
Scoring by quarter: 23–18, 19–14, 10–22, 17–23
Pts: Drozdov 13; Rebs: Khryapa 7 Asts: Ievstratenko 4		Pts: Okur 19; Rebs: Türkcan, Türkoğlu 8 Asts: Arslan 5

Boråshallen, Borås
Attendance: 1,735
Referees: Richard Stokes (ENG), Jens Staudenmayer (GER)

September 6
21:00

Boxscore

Turkey	70–75	Greece
Scoring by quarter: 26–16, 10–25, 23–13, 11–21
Pts: Okur 23; Rebs: Türkcan 13; Asts: Tunçeri 2		Pts: Rentzias 15; Rebs: Diamantidis, Rentzias 6 Asts: Diamantidis 4

Boråshallen, Borås
Attendance: 3,007
Referees: Virginijus Dovidavičius (LTU), Shmuel Bachar (ISR)

September 6
18:00

Boxscore

Croatia	93–71	Ukraine
Scoring by quarter: 15–15, 27–18, 26–14, 25–24
Pts: Giriček 21; Rebs: Bagarić 11; Asts: Popović 5		Pts: Lebediev, Okunskyy 15; Rebs: 3 Players 4 Asts: Rayevskyy 4

Boråshallen, Borås
Attendance: 1,855
Referees: Richard Stokes (ENG), Arnis Ozols (LAT)

September 7
15:45

Boxscore

Greece	79–73	Ukraine
Scoring by quarter: 9–22, 10–17, 35–16, 25–18
Pts: Dikoudis 21; Rebs: Dikoudis, Rentzias 5 Asts: 3 Players 3		Pts: Drozdov 19; Rebs: Balashov 10; Asts: Okunskyy, Rayevskyy 4

Boråshallen, Borås
Attendance: 1,575
Referees: Virginijus Dovidavičius (LTU), Arnis Ozols (LAT)

September 7
18:15

Boxscore

Turkey	75–72	Croatia
Scoring by quarter: 18–21, 17–17, 21–12, 19–22
Pts: Kutluay 23; Rebs: Türkcan 9 Asts: Yıldırım 4		Pts: Mulaomerović 16; Rebs: Prkačin 14; Asts: Mulaomerović 7

Boråshallen, Borås
Attendance: 2,460
Referees: Richard Stokes (ENG), Jens Staudenmayer (GER)

== Knockout stage ==
=== Championship bracket ===
Play-off; 8 September 2003
Russia	81
Croatia	77
Turkey	76
Serbia and Montenegro	80
Slovenia	76
Israel	78
Germany	84
Italy	86

Quarterfinals; 10–11 September 2003
France	76
Russia	69
Lithuania	98
Serbia and Montenegro	82
Spain	78
Israel	64
Greece	59
Italy	62

Semifinals; 13 September 2003
France	70
Lithuania	74
Spain	81
Italy	79

Final; 14 September 2003
Lithuania	93
Spain	84
Third place
France	67
Italy	69

==== Play-off ====
September 8
20:30

Boxscore

Slovenia	76–78	Israel
Scoring by quarter: 28–16, 15–21, 10–23, 23–18
Pts: Gorenc 21; Rebs: Nachbar 6 Asts: Lakovič 3		Pts: Green 14; Rebs: Green 10; Asts: Tapiro 9

Coop Arena, Luleå
Attendance: 1,843
Referees: Volodymyr Drabikovskyi (UKR), Ilija Belošević (SRB)

September 8
20:30

Boxscore

Germany	84–86	Italy
Scoring by quarter: 28–19, 23–25, 13–22, 20–20
Pts: Demirel 23; Rebs: Okulaja 10; Asts: Femerling 4		Pts: Bulleri 17; Rebs: Galanda 8 Asts: Bulleri 8

Himmelstalundshallen, Norrköping
Attendance: 3,240
Referees: Miguel Betancor (ESP), Grzegorz Ziemblicki (POL)

September 8
20:00

Boxscore

Russia	81–77	Croatia
Scoring by quarter: 15–21, 19–20, 24–20, 23–16
Pts: Kirilenko 29; Rebs: Kirilenko 8 Asts: Karasev 3		Pts: Mulaomerović 26; Rebs: Bagarić 8 Asts: Mulaomerović, Prkačin 3

Scaniarinken, Södertälje
Attendance: 1,559
Referees: Luigi Lamonica (ITA), Stelian Banica (ROU)

September 8
20:00

Boxscore

Turkey	76–80	Serbia and Montenegro
Scoring by quarter: 19–15, 19–19, 14–19, 24–27

Boråshallen, Borås
Attendance: 2,912
Referees: Richard Stokes (ENG), Vladimir Okhrimenko (RUS)

==== Quarterfinals ====
September 10
18:00

Boxscore

France	76–69	Russia
Scoring by quarter: 21–18, 21–21, 21–14, 13–16
Pts: Parker 18; Rebs: Moïso 11; Asts: Parker 3		Pts: Kirilenko 22; Rebs: Khryapa 8 Asts: Karasev 4

Stockholm Globe Arena, Stockholm
Referees: Lazaros Voreadis (GRE), Shmuel Bachar (ISR)

September 10
21:15

Boxscore

Lithuania	98–82	Serbia and Montenegro
Scoring by quarter: 30–19, 27–24, 23–23, 18–16
Pts: Šiškauskas 27; Rebs: Macijauskas 7 Asts: Jasikevičius 11		Pts: Ostojić 17; Rebs: Drobnjak 9 Asts: Jarić, Vujanić 3

Stockholm Globe Arena, Stockholm
Attendance: 8,252
Referees: Luigi Lamonica (ITA), Roman Kolar (SLO)

September 11
18:00

Boxscore

Spain	78–64	Israel
Scoring by quarter: 28–22, 16–14, 14–15, 20–13
Pts: Gasol 25; Rebs: Gasol 7 Asts: Calderón 4		Pts: Sharp 16; Rebs: Tapiro 6 Asts: Tapiro 5

Stockholm Globe Arena, Stockholm
Attendance: 8,466
Referees: Memduh Öget (TUR), Grzegorz Ziemblicki (POL)

September 11
21:00

Boxscore

Greece	59–62	Italy
Scoring by quarter: 16–17, 20–15, 11–17, 12–13
Pts: Dikoudis 18; Rebs: Dikoudis, Tsakalidis 8 Asts: Dikoudis, Papaloukas 2		Pts: Galanda 14; Rebs: Galanda 6 Asts: Bulleri 3

Stockholm Globe Arena, Stockholm
Attendance: 8,578
Referees: Bruno Gasperin (FRA), Vladimir Okhrimenko (RUS)

==== Semifinals ====
September 13
14:00

Boxscore

France	70–74	Lithuania
Scoring by quarter: 16–20, 21–25, 23–13, 10–16
Pts: Parker 24; Rebs: Abdul-Wahad 8 Asts: 4 Players 2		Pts: Štombergas 22; Rebs: Jasikevičius 10; Asts: Jasikevičius 7

Stockholm Globe Arena, Stockholm
Attendance: 11,023
Referees: Lazaros Voreadis (GRE), Shmuel Bachar (ISR)

September 13
17:00

Boxscore

Spain	81–79	Italy
Scoring by quarter: 20–19, 18–25, 24–16, 19–19
Pts: Navarro 23; Rebs: Jiménez 9 Asts: Marco, Navarro 2		Pts: Bulleri 24; Rebs: Bulleri 6 Asts: Soragna 3

Stockholm Globe Arena, Stockholm
Attendance: 11,096
Referees: Richard Stokes (ENG), Ilija Belošević (SRB)

==== Third place ====
September 14
17:00

Boxscore

France	67–69	Italy
Scoring by quarter: 13–24, 14–15, 20–14, 20–16
Pts: Parker 24; Rebs: Moïso 8 Asts: Parker, Sonko 1		Pts: Marconato 16; Rebs: Marconato 10; Asts: Galanda 5

Stockholm Globe Arena, Stockholm
Attendance: 13,102
Referees: Miguel Betancor (ESP), Lazaros Voreadis (GRE)

==== Final ====
September 14
20:00

Boxscore

Lithuania	93–84	Spain
Scoring by quarter: 20–19, 20–12, 22–17, 31–36
Pts: Macijauskas 21; Rebs: E. Žukauskas 7 Asts: Jasikevičius 9		Pts: Gasol 36; Rebs: Gasol 12; Asts: Calderón, Navarro 3

Stockholm Globe Arena, Stockholm
Attendance: 13,274
Referees: Luigi Lamonica (ITA), Ilija Belosevic (SCG)

=== 5th to 8th place ===
Classification round
September 12 – 18:00
Russia	77
Serbia and Montenegro	86
September 12 – 21:00
Israel	56
Greece	63

Fifth place
September 14 – 13:30
Serbia and Montenegro	64
Greece	72
Seventh place
September 14 – 11:00
Russia	82
Israel	89

September 12
18:00

Boxscore

Russia	77–86	Serbia and Montenegro
Scoring by quarter: 18–29, 22–19, 18–19, 19–19
Pts: Monia 14; Rebs: Khryapa 8 Asts: Samoylenko 3		Pts: Gurović 24; Rebs: Drobnjak 9 Asts: Drobnjak 3

Stockholm Globe Arena, Stockholm
Attendance: 9,804
Referees: Miguel Betancor (ESP), Virginijus Dovidavičius (LTU)

September 12
21:00

Boxscore

Israel	56–63	Greece
Scoring by quarter: 10–17, 12–19, 17–15, 17–12
Pts: Halperin 12; Rebs: Green 7 Asts: Halperin 3		Pts: Fotsis 19; Rebs: Fotsis 10; Asts: Papaloukas 5

Stockholm Globe Arena, Stockholm
Attendance: 9,892
Referees: Luigi Lamonica (ITA), Stelian Banica (ROU)

September 14
11:00

Boxscore

Russia	82–89	Israel
Scoring by quarter: 18–16, 18–20, 21–22, 25–31
Pts: Monia 26; Rebs: Karasev, Monia 6 Asts: Kirilenko, Monia 4		Pts: Tapiro 26; Rebs: Green 7 Asts: Burstein 4

Stockholm Globe Arena, Stockholm
Attendance: 7,723
Referees: Grzegorz Ziemblicki (POL), Fedor Dmitriev (BLR)

September 14
13:30

Boxscore

Serbia and Montenegro	64–72	Greece
Scoring by quarter: 13–21, 12–16, 15–20, 24–15
Pts: Gurović 15; Rebs: Koturović 8 Asts: Avdalović 5		Pts: Chatzivrettas 21; Rebs: 3 Players 5 Asts: Diamantidis 4

Stockholm Globe Arena, Stockholm
Referees: Volodymyr Drabikovskyi (UKR), Shmuel Bachar (ISR)

== Statistical leaders ==
=== Individual Tournament Highs ===
Points

Pos.	Name	PPG
1	(Spain) Pau Gasol	25.8
2	(Russia) Andrei Kirilenko	23.2
3	(Germany) Dirk Nowitzki	22.5
4	(Croatia) Damir Mulaomerović	16.5
5	(Spain) Juan Carlos Navarro	16.2
6	(Lithuania) Arvydas Macijauskas	15.8
7	(Lithuania) Ramūnas Šiškauskas	14.8
8	(Italy) Massimo Bulleri	14.2
9	(Lithuania) Šarūnas Jasikevičius	14.0
10	(Lithuania) Saulius Štombergas	13.7

Rebounds

Pos.	Name	RPG
1	(Germany) Ademola Okulaja	8.2
2	(Serbia and Montenegro) Predrag Drobnjak	7.5
2	(Spain) Pau Gasol	7.5
4	(Russia) Andrei Kirilenko	6.8
4	(Croatia) Nikola Prkačin	6.8
6	(Croatia) Matej Mamić	6.5
7	(Germany) Dirk Nowitzki	6.2
7	(Italy) Giacomo Galanda	6.2
9	(Russia) Victor Khryapa	6.0
9	(Croatia) Dalibor Bagarić	6.0

Assists

Pos.	Name	APG
1	(Lithuania) Šarūnas Jasikevičius	8.2
2	(Serbia and Montenegro) Marko Jarić	4.0
2	(Croatia) Damir Mulaomerović	4.0
4	(Israel) Meir Tapiro	3.4
5	(Italy) Massimo Bulleri	3.2
6	(Germany) Mithat Demirel	3.0
7	(Spain) Carles Marco	2.5
7	(Croatia) Marko Popović	2.5
9	(Israel) Tal Burstein	2.4
10	(Greece) Dimitris Diamantidis	2.3
10	(Germany) Patrick Femerling	2.3

Steals

Pos.	Name	SPG
1	(Russia) Andrei Kirilenko	3.5
2	(Lithuania) Arvydas Macijauskas	2.3
3	(Israel) Meir Tapiro	1.9
4	(Serbia and Montenegro) Marko Jarić	1.5
4	(Germany) Ademola Okulaja	1.5
6	(Russia) Zakhar Pashutin	1.4
7	(Israel) Tal Burstein	1.3
7	(Russia) Victor Khryapa	1.3
7	(Greece) Giorgos Sigalas	1.3
7	(Germany) Dirk Nowitzki	1.3

Blocks

Pos.	Name	BPG
1	(Russia) Andrei Kirilenko	2.2
1	(Lithuania) Eurelijus Žukauskas	2.2
3	(Germany) Dirk Nowitzki	1.8
4	(Spain) Pau Gasol	1.7
5	(Lithuania) Kšyštof Lavrinovič	1.5
6	(Germany) Patrick Femerling	1.2
7	(Greece) Jake Tsakalidis	1.0
7	(Croatia) Dalibor Bagarić	1.0
7	(Croatia) Matej Mamić	1.0
9	(Russia) Victor Khryapa	0.9
9	(Russia) Fedor Likholitov	0.9

Minutes

Pos.	Name	MPG
1	(Russia) Andrei Kirilenko	35.3
2	(Germany) Dirk Nowitzki	34.8
3	(Croatia) Matej Mamić	32.5
4	(Serbia and Montenegro) Milan Gurović	32.3
5	(Israel) Tal Burstein	31.6
6	(Spain) Pau Gasol	31.3
7	(Serbia and Montenegro) Marko Jarić	30.8
8	(Croatia) Gordan Giriček	30.0
9	(Lithuania) Šarūnas Jasikevičius	29.8
10	(Spain) Jorge Garbajosa	29.7

=== Individual Game Highs ===
Department	Name	Total	Opponent
Points	(Spain) Pau Gasol	36	Lithuania
Rebounds	(Croatia) Nikola Prkačin	14	Turkey
Assists	(Lithuania) Šarūnas Jasikevičius	11	Serbia and Montenegro
Steals	(Latvia) Ainars Bagatskis (Russia) Andrei Kirilenko (twice) (Israel) Meir Tapiro	5	Lithuania; France; Israel; Slovenia
Blocks	(Russia) Andrei Kirilenko	6	Serbia and Montenegro
Turnovers	(Serbia and Montenegro) Marko Jarić	9	Lithuania

=== Team Tournament Highs ===
Offensive PPG

Pos.	Name	PPG
1	Lithuania	90.7
2	Spain	84.3
3	Latvia	84.0
4	Germany	83.8
5	Russia	81.9

Rebounds

Pos.	Name	RPG
1	France	39.0
2	Croatia	36.0
3	Latvia	33.7
4	Spain	33.0
5	Serbia and Montenegro	32.7
5	Lithuania	32.7

Assists

Pos.	Name	APG
1	Lithuania	17.3
2	Latvia	16.3
3	Ukraine	14.0
4	Greece	12.0
4	Croatia	12.0
4	Sweden	12.0

Steals

Pos.	Name	SPG
1	France	9.7
2	Russia	8.6
3	Sweden	7.7
4	Lithuania	7.3
5	Israel	7.0
5	Slovenia	7.0

Blocks

Pos.	Name	BPG
1	Lithuania	4.5
2	Russia	4.4
3	Turkey	3.7
3	Ukraine	3.7
5	Germany	3.2

=== Team Game highs ===
Department	Name	Total	Opponent
Points	Spain	99	Sweden
Rebounds	Croatia; France	47	Turkey; Italy
Assists	France	23	Bosnia and Herzegovina
Steals	France	15	Italy
Blocks	Lithuania; Ukraine	8	Israel; Turkey
Field goal percentage	Croatia	60.8% (31/51)	Ukraine
3-point field goal percentage	Israel	55.6% (10/18)	Latvia
Free throw percentage	Israel	100% (6/6)	Spain
Turnovers	France	25	Russia

== Awards ==
2003 FIBA EuroBasket champions

Lithuania
3rd title

2003 FIBA EuroBasket MVP: Šarūnas Jasikevičius ( Lithuania)

All-Tournament Team
(France) Tony Parker
(Lithuania) Šarūnas Jasikevičius (MVP)
(Lithuania) Saulius Štombergas
(Russia) Andrei Kirilenko
(Spain) Pau Gasol

== Final standings ==
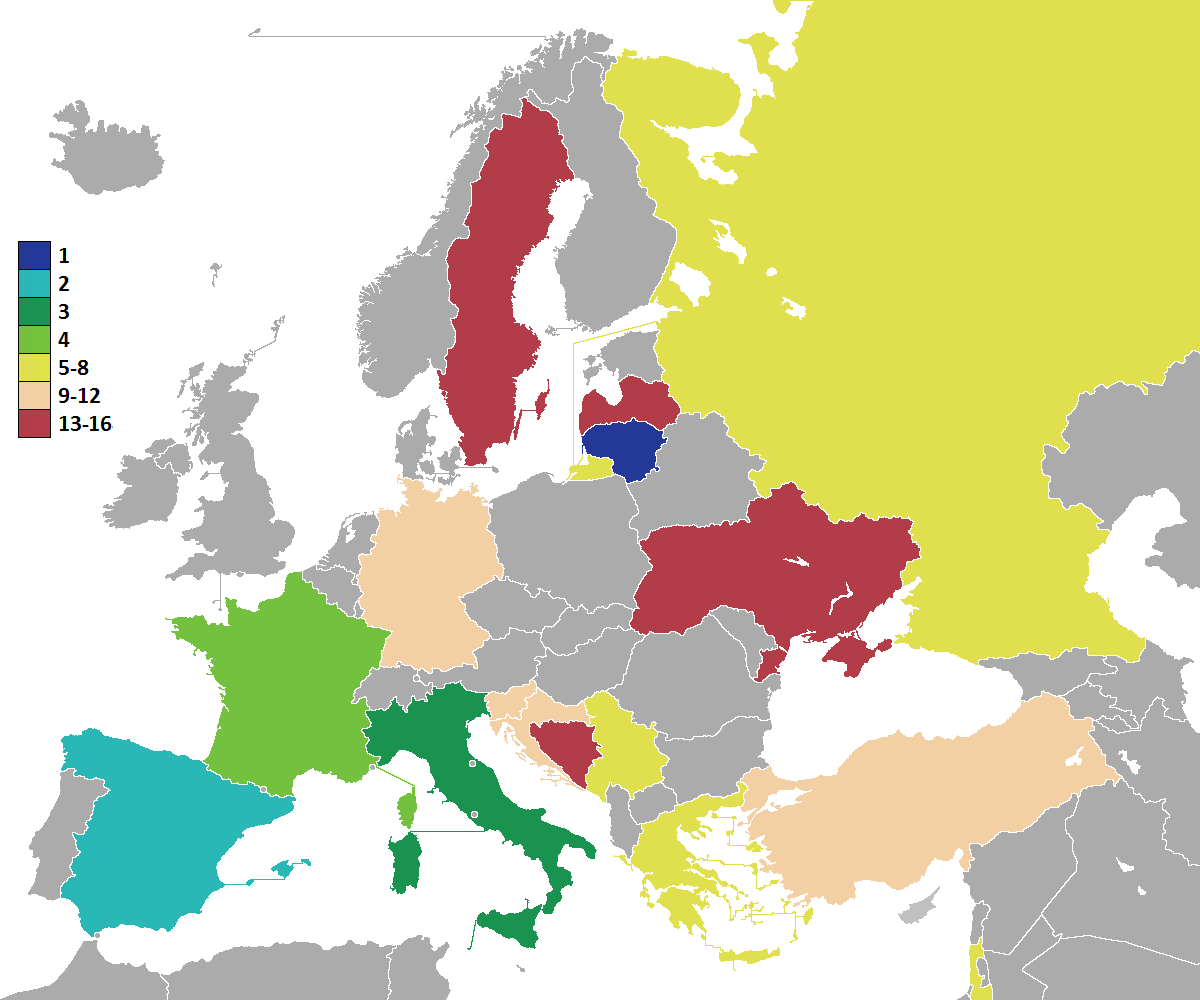
Results

Qualified for the 2004 Summer Olympics
Qualified for the 2004 Summer Olympics as host
Qualified for the 2004 Summer Olympics as current World Champion

Rank	Team	Record
1st place, gold medalist(s)	Lithuania	6–0
2nd place, silver medalist(s)	Spain	5–1
3rd place, bronze medalist(s)	Italy	4–3
4	France	4–2
5	Greece	5–1
6	Serbia and Montenegro	3–4
7	Israel	3–4
8	Russia	3–4
9	Germany	2–2
10	Slovenia	2–2
11	Croatia	1–3
12	Turkey	2–2
13	Latvia	0–3
14	Ukraine	0–3
15	Bosnia and Herzegovina	0–3
16	Sweden	0–3

1st	2nd	3rd	4th
Lithuania Giedrius Gustas; Mindaugas Žukauskas; Arvydas Macijauskas; Saulius Štombergas; Ramūnas Šiškauskas; Darius Songaila; Donatas Slanina; Eurelijus Žukauskas; Kšyštof Lavrinovič; Šarūnas Jasikevičius; Dainius Šalenga; Virginijus Praškevičius	Spain Pau Gasol; Roger Grimau; Carles Marco; Juan Carlos Navarro; José Calderon; Felipe Reyes; Carlos Jiménez; Alberto Herreros; Rodrigo de la Fuente; Antonio Bueno; Alfonso Reyes; Jorge Garbajosa	Italy Nikola Radulović; Gianluca Basile; Giacomo Galanda; Matteo Soragna; Denis Marconato; Alessandro De Pol; Alex Righetti; Davide Lamma; Massimo Bulleri; Michele Mian; Roberto Chiacig; Alessandro Cittadini	France Moustapha Sonko; Tariq Abdul-Wahad; Jérôme Moïso; Laurent Foirest; Alain Digbeu; Tony Parker; Makan Dioumassi; Florent Piétrus; Cyril Julian; Boris Diaw; Thierry Rupert; Ronny Turiaf
