= Matteo Soragna =

Italian basketball player (born 1975)

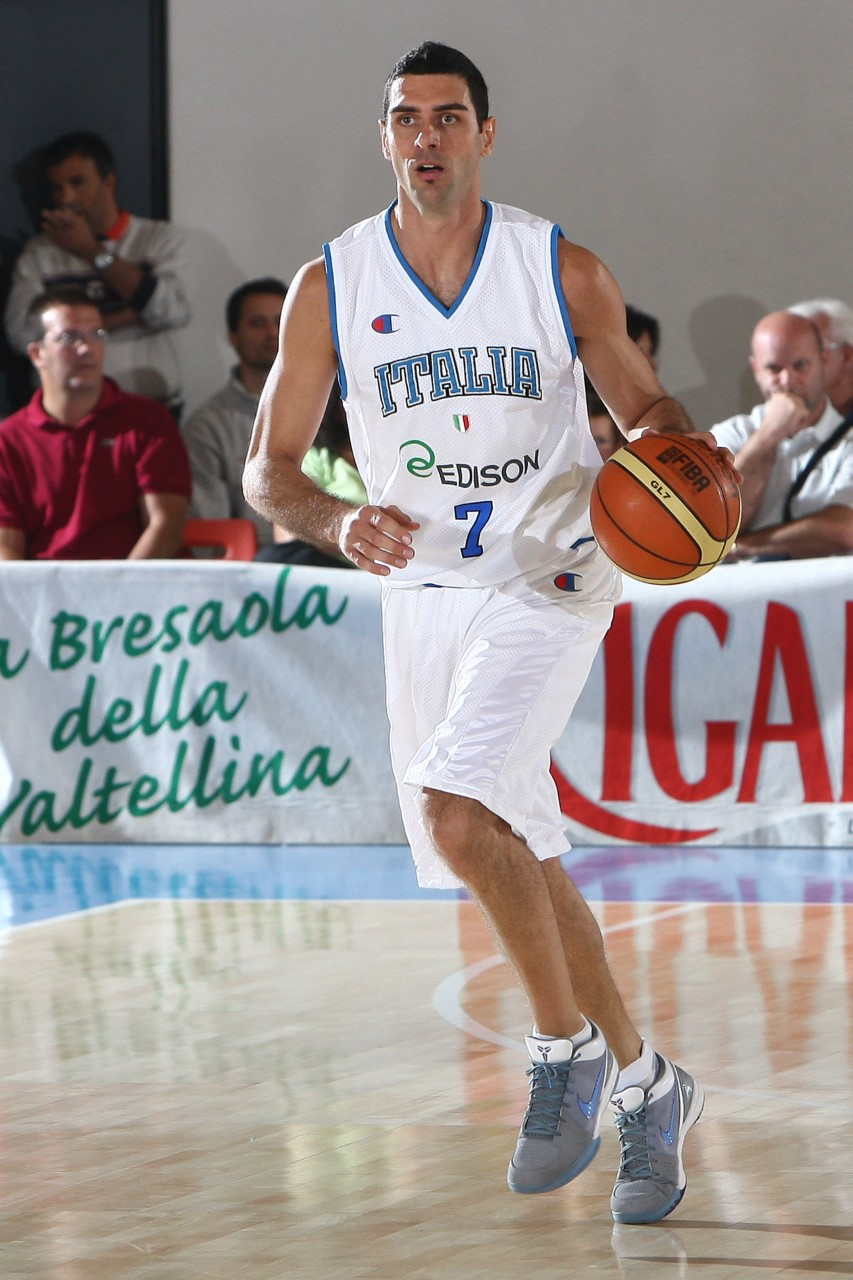

Personal information
- Born: December 26, 1975 (age 50) Mantua, Italy
- Listed height: 198 cm (6 ft 6 in)
- Listed weight: 100 kg (220 lb)

Career information
- NBA draft: 1997: undrafted
- Playing career: 1993–2017
- Position: Small forward / guard

Career history
- 1993–1996: Juvi Cremona
- 1996–1997: Rolly Pistoia
- 1997–2000: Basket Barcellona
- 2000–2004: Pallacanestro Biella
- 2004–2009: Benetton Treviso
- 2009–2013: Angelico Biella
- 2013–2015: Upea Capo d'Orlando
- 2015–2017: Bakery Piacenza

Career highlights
- Italian League champion (2006); 2× Italian Cup winner (2005, 2007); Italian Supercup winner (2006)
Medals
Representing Italy
Basketball
Olympic Games
Silver medal – second place	2004 Athens	Team competition
EuroBasket
Bronze medal – third place	2003 Sweden	Team competition

Matteo Soragna (born 26 December 1975) is an Italian former professional basketball player. He can switch between all perimeter positions (shooting guard, small forward and point guard).

He was part of the Italian national team that won a silver medal at the 2004 Summer Olympics.

== Professional career ==
The Mantuan played youth basketball with local clubs Vigor and Pallacanestro Mantovana before moving to third division Serie B side Juvi Cremona in 1993 to start his professional career.

After three years with Cremona Soragna discovered the first division Serie A with Rolly Pistoia in 1996. He then moved to Basket Barcellona of the fourth division Serie B2, helping the Sicilians earn promotions to the Serie B1 in 1998, then the Serie A2 in 1999 before losing in the promotion playoffs final in 2000.

Moving to Pallacanestro Biella in 2000, he was this time part of a successful promotion run as the side moved up to the Serie A at the end of the season. The 2001-02 season saw him become Biella's captain. In his fourth season with the side he posted 11.1 points (with 39.1% shooting accuracy from three), 2.9 rebounds, 2.6 assists and 2.3 steals in nearly 33 minutes per game. As he was leaving the club in 2004, Biella retired his number 7 shirt in recognition of his contributions to the club.

Soragna moved to Benetton Treviso for 2004-05, making his European top-tier Euroleague debut and winning the Italian Cup that same season. He was named club captain the next season following the departure of Denis Marconato, leading Treviso to the 2006 Serie A title. He also won the 2006 Supercup and 2007 Cup in his five years with the side.

Soragna returned to Biella in July 2009, signing a three-year deal with the side about to make its European second-tier Eurocup debut. After becoming the all-time best scorer and the player with the most appearances for Biella in 2010-11, Soragna extended his contract for three seasons in July 2011. The 2012-13 season was less uplifting as he injured himself early in the season, missing a good part of it as Biella were relegated after twelve years in the top-flight.

He would return to the Serie A2 with a different club, signing with Upea Capo d'Orlando in August 2013. Again serving as captain, Soragna averaged 7.3 points (42.2% shooting from three), 3 rebounds and 2 assists in 29 regular season games and 9.5 points (51% from three), 3 rebounds and 2.5 assists in the playoffs, he had an important part in the team's promotion, including playing in the final whilst injured. In August 2014, he extended his contract for the following season, one that saw him return to Serie A. On 3 August 2015, he moved to Serie B side Bakery Piacenza, signing a one-year deal.

On 26 October 2017, he announced his retirement from professional basketball.

== International career ==
Soragna played for the Under-22 Italy squad at the 1996 European Championship. He made his debut for the senior Italian national team on 25 November 2001 in a FIBA EuroBasket 2003 qualification game against the Czech Republic.

At the EuroBasket 2003 final phase he averaged 6.5 points, 1.3 assists and 1 steal in nearly 21 minutes per game, Italy upset Germany, Greece and France, the latter in a third place game that gave them a bronze medal and a place in the 2004 Summer Olympics, Soragna played 31 minutes in that game, for 5 points, 3 rebounds, 1 assist and 2 steals.

Again, part of the Italian team at the Athens Olympics the next summer, he averaged 5.2 points, 2.9 rebounds and 1.1. assists in nearly 24 minutes per game. He scored 12 points to help Italy get past European champions Lithuania in the semifinal, which already assured the Italians an olympic medal. Soragna also contributed 12 points in the final against Argentina but that was not enough to earn the win, with the Italians going home with a silver medal.

At EuroBasket 2005, Soragna had 5 points and 2.3 assists in nearly 20 minutes per game as Italy finished joint-ninth. Soragna was one of the veterans kept in the squad for the 2006 FIBA World Championship after Italy - receiving a wildcard invitation - sent a younger squad. He posted averages of 10,3 points, 1.8 rebounds and 2.7 assists in about 24 minutes, that included 15 points in the third group stage win against Senegal that took Italy to the Last 16, where they lost.

Called up for EuroBasket 2007, he had averages of 6.5 points, 1.7 assists and 1.3 steals over around 24 minutes, he was held scoreless in 22 minutes (for 1 assist, steal and turnover each and 2 fouls) as Italy lost to Germany in the Second Round to exit the tournament. He was Italy's captain during FIBA EuroBasket 2009 qualification, but could not help them reach the tournament proper, this proved to be his last participation with the national team.
