= FIBA Under-19 Basketball World Cup Most Valuable Player =

Youth basketball award

The FIBA Under-19 Basketball World Cup Most Valuable Player is a biennial award, that is given by FIBA, to the Most Valuable Player of the FIBA Under-19 World Cup.

== Winners ==
| | Denotes player whose team won that years tournament |
| | Denotes player inducted into the FIBA Hall of Fame |
| | Denotes player who is still active |
| Player (X) | Denotes the number of times the player had been named MVP at that time |
| Team (X) | Denotes the number of times a player from this team had won at that time |

| Year | Player | Position | Team | Ref. |
|---|---|---|---|---|
| 1987 | Toni Kukoč | Forward | Yugoslavia | |
| 1991 | Dejan Bodiroga | Forward | Yugoslavia (2) | |
| 1995 | Efthimios Rentzias | Center | Greece | |
| 1999 | Andrei Kirilenko | Forward | Russia | |
| 2003 | Andrew Bogut | Center | Australia | |
| 2007 | Milan Mačvan | Forward | Serbia | |
| 2009 | Mario Delaš | Center | Croatia | |
| 2011 | Jonas Valančiūnas | Center | Lithuania | |
| 2013 | Aaron Gordon | Forward | United States | |
| 2015 | Jalen Brunson | Guard | United States (2) | |
| 2017 | RJ Barrett | Guard | Canada | |
| 2019 | Reggie Perry | Forward | United States (3) | |
| 2021 | Chet Holmgren | Forward | United States (4) | |
| 2023 | Izan Almansa | Center | Spain | |
| 2025 | AJ Dybantsa | Forward | United States (5) | |
