= Nikola Radulović =

Croatian-born Italian basketball player

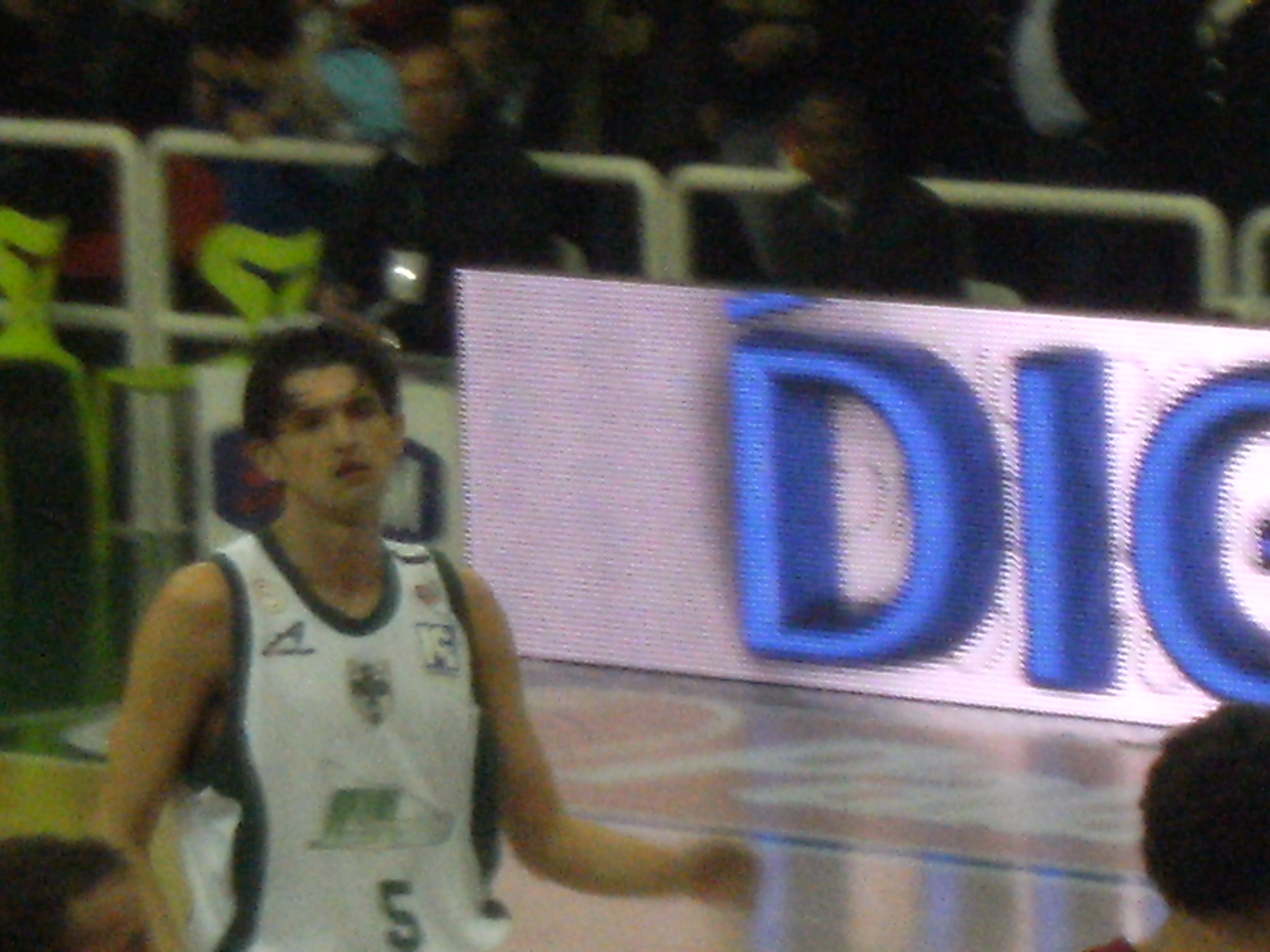

Personal information
- Born: 26 April 1973 (age 53) Zagreb, SR Croatia, SFR Yugoslavia
- Listed height: 2.07 m (6 ft 9 in)
- Listed weight: 105 kg (231 lb)

Career information
- Playing career: 1996–2012
- Position: Power forward
- Number: 4

Career history
- 1996–1997: Olimpija Osijek
- 1997–1998: Croatia Line Rijeka
- 1998: Cibona
- 1998–1999: Šibenik
- 1999–2000: Sporting Athens
- 2000–2001: Napoli
- 2001–2002: ASVEL
- 2002–2004: Joventut Badalona
- 2004–2006: Valladolid
- 2006: Azovmash Mariupol
- 2006–2009: Scandone Avellino
- 2009–2010: Brindisi
- 2010–2012: Scafati

Career highlights
- French League champion (2002); Italian Cup winner (2008); Italian 2nd Division champion (2010)
Medals
Representing Italy
Men's basketball
Summer Olympics
Silver medal – second place	2004 Athens
EuroBasket
Bronze medal – third place	2003 Sweden

Nikola Radulović (born 26 April 1973) is a Croatian-born Italian former professional basketball player. He was born in Croatia but later gained Italian citizenship and played for the Italian national basketball team.

== Professional career ==
Radulović began his basketball career in his native Croatia where he played with Olimpija Osijek, Croatia Line Rijeka, Cibona and Šibenik. He later played with the following clubs: Sporting Athens, Basket Napoli, ASVEL Basket, DKV Joventut, Fórum Valladolid, Azovmash, Air Avellino, Enel Brindisi and Scafati Basket.

He won the French League championship in 2002, while playing with ASVEL Basket. He also won the Italian Cup in 2008, while playing with Air Avellino.

== National team career ==
Radulović played with the senior Italian national basketball team from 2001 till 2004. He won the silver medal at the 2004 Summer Olympics and the bronze medal at the EuroBasket 2003. He also played at the EuroBasket 2001.
