= Rolando Hourruitiner =

Puerto Rican basketball player (born 1975)

Personal information
- Born: May 28, 1975 (age 51) San Juan, Puerto Rico

Career information
- Playing career: 1992–2006
- Coaching career: 2009–2015

Career history
- 1992–1995: Leones de Ponce
- 1996–1997: Cariduros de Fajardo
- 1998: Gallitos de Isabela
- 1999–2006: Cangrejeros de Santurce

Career highlights
- As player: 6× BSN Champion (1992, 1993, 1999, 2000, 2001, 2003); As coach: BSN Coach of the Year (2010)
Medals
Representing Puerto Rico
Men's basketball
FIBA AmeriCup
| Gold medal – first place | 1995 Argentina |
| Bronze medal – third place | 2003 San Juan |
Centrobasket
| Silver medal – second place | 2004 Santo Domingo |
Pan American Games
| Bronze medal – third place | Winnipeg 1999 |

Rolando Hourruitiner (born May 28, 1975) is a business professional and entrepreneur; focusing mainly in sports & entertainment, media, digital, mobile and hospitality. Hourruitiner is a former basketball player, coach and sports agent with extensive international exposure. He has also been featured as a basketball TV commentator and analyst in Puerto Rico.

Rolando was a member of the Puerto Rico Basketball National Team from 1995 until 2004, including been a key player of the 2004 team that defeated the United States Basketball National Team at the 2004 Olympic Games in Athens, Greece. He also competed in PanAm Games, Goodwill Games and FIBA World Cup.

Hourruitiner graduated from Charleston Southern University in Charleston, SC, in 1998. He was co-captain of the 1996-1997 Charleston Southern Buccaneers men's basketball team, which won the Big South Conference championship and qualified for the 1997 NCAA basketball tournament. The appearance marked Charleston Southern's first entry in the NCAA tournament.

In October, 2015, Rolando was inducted into the Sports Hall of Fame of his hometown Caguas, Puerto Rico (Pabellón de la Fama del Deporte Cagüeño). He was honored and recognized for his years of continued success as a basketball player, coach and executive, including his 10 years (1995–2004) as a member of the Puerto Rico Basketball National Team.
