= Cho Sang-hyun =

South Korean basketball player

Cho Sang-Hyun
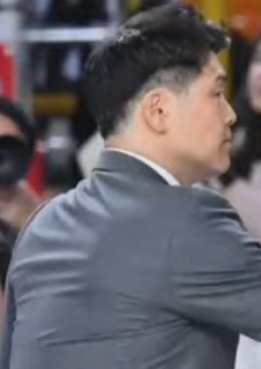

Personal information
- Born: July 8, 1976 (age 50)
- Listed height: 6 ft 2 in (1.88 m)

Career information
- College: Yonsei University
- Playing career: 1998–2013
- Position: Head coach

Career history
- 1998–1999: Gwangju Nasan Flamans
- 1999–2006: Cheongju SK Knights
- 2005–2006: KTF Magic Wings
- 2011–2013: Goyang Orions
Medals
Men's basketball
Representing South Korea
FIBA Asia Championship
| Silver medal – second place | 1999 Fukuoka | Team |
| Bronze medal – third place | 2001 Shanghai | Team |
Asian Games
| Gold medal – first place | 2002 Busan | Team |

- Cho Sang-hyun
- Hangul: 조상현
- Hanja: 曺相鉉
- RR: Jo Sanghyeon
- MR: Cho Sanghyŏn

Cho Sang-Hyun (Korean: 조상현; born 8 July 1976) is a South Korean professional basketball coach and retired player formerly with the Korean KBL team Changwon LG Sakers. He represented South Korea's national basketball team on many occasions.

He played the Shooting guard / small forward positions.

== Achievements ==
=== Individual ===
- 1998-99, 2001: Korea national basketball team
- 2001, 2004, 2005, 2009: Korean KBL All Star Game
- 2001: Korean KBL All Star Game Champion 3 point contest
- 2001: Korean KBL Model player

=== Team ===
- 2001: Bronze at Asian Championship
- 1999: Silver at Asian Championship
