= Matt Shanahan (basketball) =

Australian basketball player

Sherbrooke Suns
- Title: Head coach
- League: Big V

Personal information
- Born: 13 July 1976 (age 50) Melbourne, Victoria, Australia
- Listed height: 195 cm (6 ft 5 in)
- Listed weight: 93 kg (205 lb)

Career information
- Playing career: 1993–2012
- Position: Guard
- Coaching career: 2007–present

Career history

Playing
- 1993: Australian Institute of Sport
- 1994–1998: North Melbourne Giants
- 1994–1996: North East Melbourne Arrows
- 1998–1999: Brisbane Bullets
- 1999: Wollongong Hawks
- 1999–2000: Cairns Taipans
- 2000–2002: Wollongong Hawks
- 2003: Canberra Cannons
- 2003–2004: Kilsyth Cobras
- 2003–2004: Hunter Pirates
- 2004–2006: Perth Wildcats
- 2005: Stirling Senators
- 2006: Kilsyth Cobras
- 2006–2008: South Dragons
- 2007: Ballarat Miners
- 2008: Waverley Falcons
- 2009: Kilsyth Cobras
- 2010–2012: Coffs Harbour Suns

Coaching
- 2007: Ballarat Miners
- 2008: Waverley Falcons
- 2010–2012: Coffs Harbour Suns
- 2013–2014: Knox Raiders
- 2026–present: Sherbrooke Suns

Career highlights
- 3× NBL champion (1992, 1994, 2001); All-SEABL South Team (2003)

Matthew Shanahan (born 13 July 1976) is an Australian basketball coach and former player. He played 15 seasons in the Australian National Basketball League (NBL).

== Early life ==
Shanahan was born in Melbourne, Victoria. He grew up playing at the Nunawading Association.

== Professional career ==
Shanahan was a junior with the South East Melbourne Magic when they won the 1992 NBL championship. In 1993, he attended the Australian Institute of Sport (AIS) and played for the AIS men's team in the South East Australian Basketball League.

In 1994, Shanahan made his NBL debut for the North Melbourne Giants, winning his second NBL championship that year. He continued with the Giants in 1995, 1996, 1997, and 1998. During this time, he also played for the North East Melbourne Arrows in the SEABL in 1994, 1995, and 1996.

For the 1998–99 NBL season, Shanahan joined the Brisbane Bullets.

After starting the 1999–2000 NBL season with a one-game stint with the Wollongong Hawks, Shanahan joined the Cairns Taipans in November 1999 and played 22 games.

For the 2000–01 NBL season, Shanahan re-joined the Wollongong Hawks. He won his third NBL championship that year. He played a second season with the Hawks in 2001–02. He started the 2002–03 NBL season with the Hawks but left in November 2002.

In February 2003, Shanahan joined the Canberra Cannons for the rest of the 2002–03 season.

After playing for the Kilsyth Cobras in the 2003 SEABL season, where he earned All-SEABL South Team honours, Shanahan joined the Hunter Pirates for the 2003–04 NBL season.

Shanahan played a second season for the Cobras in 2004 and then joined the Perth Wildcats for the 2004–05 NBL season.

After playing for the Stirling Senators of the State Basketball League (SBL) in 2005, Shanahan re-joined the Wildcats for the 2005–06 NBL season.

Shanahan had a second stint with the Kilsyth Cobras in 2006 and then joined the South Dragons for the 2006–07 NBL season.

After serving as player-coach with the Ballarat Miners in the 2007 SEABL season, Shanahan returned to the Dragons for the 2007–08 NBL season.

In 2008, Shanahan had a brief playing stint with the Waverley Falcons in the Big V.

In 2009, Shanahan averaged 11.8 points, 2.8 rebounds and 2.8 assist per game with the Kilsyth Cobras.

== National team ==
Shanahan competed for Australia at the 1995 FIBA Under-19 World Championship.

== Coaching career ==
Shanahan served as player-coach of the Ballarat Miners in the 2007 SEABL season, with the team missing the playoffs.

In 2008, Shanahan served as head coach of the Waverley Falcons in the Big V.

In 2010, Shanahan joined the Coffs Harbour Suns of the Waratah League Division 1 as player-coach. He helped the Suns win the Division 1 state league title in 2012 with grand final MVP honours. He left Coffs Harbour Basketball in December 2012 after three years as operations and development manager.

Shanahan joined the Knox Raiders as head coach for the 2013 SEABL season. He returned as coach in 2014. After sitting out the 2015 season, the Raiders returned in 2016 in the Big V. Darryl McDonald was named men's coach, as Shanahan continued on as Knox Basketball's development manager.

In 2023, Shanahan served as head coach of the Australian Catholic University men's and women's basketball teams in the University Basketball League (UBL).

In October 2025, Shanahan was appointed head coach of the Sherbrooke Suns women's team for the 2026 Big V season. He guided the Suns to the Big V grand final, where they lost 113–61 to the McKinnon Cougars.
