= Sharif Fajardo =

Puerto Rican basketball player

Personal information
- Born: June 9, 1976 (age 50) New York City, New York
- Listed height: 6 ft 9 in (2.06 m)
- Listed weight: 235 lb (107 kg; 16.8 st)

Career information
- College: UTEP (1995–1999)
- NBA draft: 1999: undrafted
- Playing career: 1999–2008
- Position: Power forward
Medals
Representing Puerto Rico
Men's basketball
Pan American Games
| Bronze medal – third place | 1999 Winnipeg |

Sharif Karim Fajardo Blanding (born June 9, 1976) is a Puerto Rican former professional basketball player. Fajardo has played in the CBA, NCAA, and the National Superior Basketball League of Puerto Rico (BSN) with Santurce Crabbers, Quebradillas Pirates and the San Germán Athletics. Fajardo has played internationally in France, Italy, and Greece. Fajardo participated in the 2005 Pre-Season Training Camp of the Toronto Raptors of the NBA. Fajardo was a member of the Puerto Rican National Basketball Team, most notably the 2004 Puerto Rican National Basketball Team that defeated the United States at the 2004 Olympic Games in Greece.

== Biography ==
In 2001/02 season, he played in the Italian LegADue for Pallacanestro Messina.

In 2002, Fajardo was close to joining the Pompea Napoli Italian Serie A, but never did due to an injury and an adaptation about the number of extra-EEC players. He underwent surgical treatment at his left knee in Sep 02. On Nov 02, Fajardo moved to Idaho Stampede of the Continental Basketball Association (CBA) and was waived on Jan 03. Fajardo played in 21 games and averaged 14.3 PPG 5.4 RPG 1.5 APG., Fajardo also played shortly at Iraklio Crete, Greece playing in 3 games averaging 4.7 PPG, 1.7 RPG, with 1 assist.

In 2003, he joined the San Germán Athletics of the National Superior Basketball League of Puerto Rico (BSN). He went on to play for the Coop Nordest Trieste of the Italian Serie A, where he played in 28 games averaging 15.1 PPG, 7.3 RPG, and 0.6 APG.

In summer of 2004, Fajardo was a power forward of the 2004 Puerto Rican National Basketball Team that defeated the United States in the 2004 Olympic Games.

In 2004, he played for Strasbourg IG of the French ProA where he played in the FIBA Europe League playing in 13 games averaging 17.4 PPG, 6.3 RPG, 8 assists, .549 field goal percentage, .459 3-point percentage. During the French ProA League, Fajardo played in 33 games averaging 13.7 PPG, 4.7 RPG, 0.8 APG, 0.2 SPG, .475 field goal percentage, .271 3-point percentage. Fajardo helped Strasbourg IG win the French Championship in 2004–2005 season.

In 2005, Fajardo was invited to play with Toronto Raptors during the NBA Summer Pro League. He signed with the Arecibo Captains of the National Superior Basketball League of Puerto Rico (BSN). He also played in the Italian Lega2 with Banco di Sardegna Sassari.

In 2006, Fajardo injured his knee and was unable to participate with the Puerto Rican National Basketball Team in Japan in the 2006 FIBA World Championship.

In 2007, Fajardo before playing with the Santurce Crabbers of the National Superior Basketball League of Puerto Rico (BSN).
