= Rodolfo Rombaldoni =

Italian basketball player (born 1976)

Personal information
- Born: 15 December 1976 (age 49) Sant'Elpidio a Mare, Italy
- Listed height: 6 ft 4 in (1.93 m)
- Listed weight: 211.2 lb (96 kg)

Career information
- Playing career: 2004–present
- Position: Point guard / shooting guard

Career history
- 1994–1996: Scaligera Verona
- 1996–1997: Olimpia Pistoia
- 1997–1998: Basket Barcellona
- 1998: Basket Napoli
- 1998–1999: Basket Barcellona
- 1999–2002: Scaligera Verona
- 2002–2004: Viola Reggio Calabria
- 2004–2005: Aurora Jesi
- 2005–2006: Fortitudo Bologna
- 2006–2007: Scafati Basket
- 2007: Montepaschi Siena
- 2007–2010: Reyer Venezia
- 2010: Scaligera Verona
- 2011: Angelico Biella
- 2011–2012: Leonessa Brescia
- 2012–present: Monticelli Basket
Medals
Representing Italy
Men's basketball
Olympic Games
Silver medal – second place	2004 Athens	Team competition

Rodolfo Rombaldoni (born 15 December 1976) is an Italian basketball player from Sant'Elpidio a Mare, who won the silver medal with the Italian men's national team at the 2004 Summer Olympics in Athens, Greece.
