= Antonio Latimer =

Puerto Rican basketball player

Personal information
- Born: November 26, 1978 (age 47) Río Piedras, Puerto Rico
- Listed height: 6 ft 8 in (2.03 m)
- Listed weight: 240 lb (110 kg)

Career information
- College: Missouri Southern (2001–2002)
- Playing career: 1994–present
- Position: Power forward
Medals
Representing Puerto Rico
Men's basketball
FIBA AmeriCup
Bronze medal – third place	2003 San Juan
Centrobasket
Gold medal – first place	2003 Culiacan
Bronze medal – third place	2006 Panama City
Pan American Games
Bronze medal – third place	1999 Winnipeg
Bronze medal – third place	2003 Santo Domingo

Antonio Latimer Rivera (born November 26, 1978) is a Puerto Rican professional basketball player. Latimer has played in the NCAA and the National Superior Basketball League of Puerto Rico (BSN) with Ponce Lions, Coamo Marathon Runners, Mayagüez Indios, and Bayamon Cowboys. Latimer has also played internationally in Israel and Spain Latimer was a member of the Puerto Rican National Basketball Team.

== Brief biography ==
Latimer spent his college years playing for Southern Missouri. He has played professionally in the National Superior Basketball League of Puerto Rico since 1994. Latimer has been a member of the Puerto Rican National Basketball Team in 2002 and 2006.
