= Alex Righetti =

Italian basketball player (born 1977)

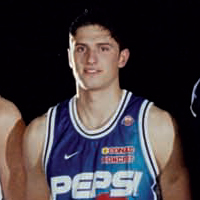
- Righetti in the 1997–98 season

Personal information
- Born: 14 August 1977 (age 49) Rimini, Italy
- Listed height: 6 ft 6 in (1.98 m)
- Listed weight: 216 lb (98 kg)

Career information
- NBA draft: 1999: undrafted
- Playing career: 1993–2017
- Position: Small forward
- Number: 9

Career history
- 1993–2000: Basket Rimini
- 2000–2007: Virtus Roma
- 2007–2008: Scandone Avellino
- 2008–2010: Virtus Bologna
- 2010–2011: Pallacanestro Varese
- 2011–2012: Juvecaserta
- 2012–2013: FCM Ferentino
- 2013–2017: Virtus Roma

Career highlights
- FIBA EuroChallenge champion (2009); Italian Cup champion (2008); Italian Supercup champion (2000)
Medals
Men's basketball
Representing Italy
Olympic Games
Silver medal – second place	2004 Athens	Team competition
European Championships
Bronze medal – third place	2003 Sweden	Team competition

Alessandro "Alex" Righetti (born 14 August 1977) is an Italian former professional basketball player. Righetti won the silver medal with the Italian men's national team at the 2004 Summer Olympics in Athens, Greece. In April 2017, his retirement was announced.
