= 1993 FIBA Europe Under-16 Championship =

1993 EuroBasket Under-16
12th FIBA Europe Under-16 Championship

Tournament details
- Host country: Turkey
- Dates: 1–8 August 1993
- Teams: 12
- Venue(s): (in 3 host cities)

Final positions
- Champions: Greece (2nd title)

Official website
- Official website (archive)

The 1993 FIBA Europe Under-16 Championship (known at that time as 1993 European Championship for Cadets) was the 12th edition of the FIBA Europe Under-16 Championship. The cities of Trabzon, Giresun and Samsun, in Turkey, hosted the tournament. Greece won the trophy for the second time.

== Teams ==
- Czech Republic
- France
- Germany
- Greece
- Iceland
- Israel
- Italy
- Lithuania
- Poland
- Russia
- Spain
- Turkey

== Preliminary round ==
The twelve teams were allocated in two groups of six teams each.

Team advanced to Semifinals
Team competed in 5th–8th playoffs
Team competed in 9th–12th playoffs

=== Group A ===
Team	Pld	W	L	PF	PA	Pts
Greece	5	4	1	423	300	9
Spain	5	4	1	346	309	9
Lithuania	5	4	1	414	319	9
Israel	5	2	3	348	338	7
Poland	5	1	4	325	440	6
Czech Republic	5	0	5	249	399	5

=== Group B ===
Team	Pld	W	L	PF	PA	Pts
Turkey	5	5	0	309	250	10
Russia	5	4	1	345	293	9
Italy	5	2	3	279	274	7
France	5	2	3	305	290	7
Iceland	5	1	4	309	404	6
Germany	5	1	4	286	322	6

== Knockout stage ==
=== 9th–12th playoffs ===
Playoffs
Poland	61
Germany	73
Czech Republic	60
Iceland	75

Ninth place
Germany	74
Iceland	75
Eleventh place
Poland	85
Czech Republic	77

=== 5th–8th playoffs ===
Playoffs
Lithuania	72
France	55
Italy	85
Israel	70

Fifth place
Lithuania	76
Italy	67
Seventh place
France	74
Israel	50

=== Championship ===
Semifinals
Spain	60
Turkey	58
Greece	92
Russia	70

Final
Spain	58
Greece	76
Third place
Turkey	62
Russia	72

1993 FIBA Europe U-16 Championship

Greece
Second title

== Final standings ==
Rank	Team
Gold medal	Greece
Silver medal	Spain
Bronze medal	Russia
4th	Turkey
5th	Lithuania
6th	Italy
7th	France
8th	Israel
9th	Iceland
10th	Germany
11th	Poland
12th	Czech Republic
