= Yugoslav basketball clubs in international competitions =

Yugoslav basketball clubs in European and worldwide competitions is the performance record of men's professional basketball clubs from the former Socialist Federal Republic of Yugoslavia's top-tier level, First Federal Basketball League, that played in international competitions.

== The finals ==
Season	Champion	Result	Runner-up	Date	Venue	
FIBA European Champions Cup & EuroLeague (1st tier)
1971–72	Ignis Varese (Italy)	70–69	(Socialist Federal Republic of Yugoslavia) Jugoplastika	23/03/1972	Yad Eliyahu Arena, Tel Aviv	
1978–79	Bosna (Socialist Federal Republic of Yugoslavia)	96–93	(Italy) Emerson Varese	05/04/1979	Palais des Sports, Grenoble	
1984–85	Cibona (Socialist Federal Republic of Yugoslavia)	87–78	(Spain) Real Madrid	03/04/1985	Peace and Friendship Stadium, Piraeus, Athens	
1985–86	Cibona (Socialist Federal Republic of Yugoslavia)	94–82	(Soviet Union) Žalgiris	03/04/1986	Sportcsarnok, Budapest	
1988–89	Jugoplastika (Socialist Federal Republic of Yugoslavia)	75–69	(Israel) Maccabi Elite Tel Aviv	06/04/1989	Olympiahalle, Munich	
1989–90	Jugoplastika (Socialist Federal Republic of Yugoslavia)	72–67	(Spain) FC Barcelona Banca Catalana	19/04/1990	Pabellón Príncipe Felipe, Zaragoza	
1990–91	POP 84 (Socialist Federal Republic of Yugoslavia)	70–65	(Spain) FC Barcelona Banca Catalana	18/04/1991	Palais Omnisports de Paris-Bercy, Paris	
1991–92	Partizan (Socialist Federal Republic of Yugoslavia)	71–70	(Spain) Montigalà Joventut	16/04/1992	Abdi İpekçi Arena, Istanbul	
FIBA Saporta Cup (2nd tier)
1971–72	Simmenthal Milano (Italy)	74–70	(Socialist Federal Republic of Yugoslavia) Crvena zvezda	21/03/1972	Alexandreio Melathron, Thessaloniki	
1972–73	Spartak Leningrad (Soviet Union)	77–62	(Socialist Federal Republic of Yugoslavia) Jugoplastika	20/03/1973	Alexandreio Melathron, Thessaloniki	
1973–74	Crvena zvezda (Socialist Federal Republic of Yugoslavia)	86–75	(Czechoslovakia) Spartak ZJŠ Brno	02/04/1974	Palasport Primo Carnera, Udine	
1974–75	Spartak Leningrad (Soviet Union)	63–62	(Socialist Federal Republic of Yugoslavia) Crvena zvezda	26/03/1975	Palais des Sports de Beaulieu, Nantes	
1976–77	Birra Forst Cantù (Italy)	87–86	(Socialist Federal Republic of Yugoslavia) Radnički Belgrade	29/03/1977	Nuevo Palacio de los Deportes, Palma de Mallorca	
1981–82	Cibona (Socialist Federal Republic of Yugoslavia)	96–95	(Spain) Real Madrid	16/03/1982	Salle Henri Simonet, Brussels	
1986–87	Cibona (Socialist Federal Republic of Yugoslavia)	89–74	(Italy) Scavolini Pesaro	17/03/1987	Dvorana SPC Vojvodina, Novi Sad	
FIBA Korać Cup (3rd tier)
1972	Lokomotiva (Socialist Federal Republic of Yugoslavia)	165–156 (two-leg)	(Socialist Federal Republic of Yugoslavia) OKK Beograd	29/02 & 07/03/1972	Hala sportova, Belgrade	SFK Trešnjevci, Zagreb
1973–74	Birra Forst Cantù (Italy)	174–154 (two-leg)	(Socialist Federal Republic of Yugoslavia) Partizan	04 & 11/04/1974	Palazzetto dello Sport Parini, Cantù	Hala sportova, Belgrade
1975–76	Jugoplastika (Socialist Federal Republic of Yugoslavia)	179–166 (two-leg)	(Italy) Chinamartini Torino	16 & 23/03/1976	Dvorana Gripe, Split	PalaRuffini, Turin
1976–77	Jugoplastika (Socialist Federal Republic of Yugoslavia)	87–84	(Italy) Alco Bologna	05/04/1977	Palasport della Fiera, Genoa	
1977–78	Partizan (Socialist Federal Republic of Yugoslavia)	117–110	(Socialist Federal Republic of Yugoslavia) Bosna	21/03/1978	Sportska dvorana Borik, Banja Luka	
1978–79	Partizan (Socialist Federal Republic of Yugoslavia)	108–98	(Italy) Arrigoni Rieti	20/03/1979	Hala Pionir, Belgrade	
1979–80	Arrigoni Rieti (Italy)	76–71	(Socialist Federal Republic of Yugoslavia) Cibona	26/03/1980	Country Hall du Sart Tilman, Liège	
1981–82	Limoges CSP (France)	90–84	(Socialist Federal Republic of Yugoslavia) Šibenka	18/03/1982	Palasport San Lazzaro, Padua	
1982–83	Limoges CSP (France)	94–86	(Socialist Federal Republic of Yugoslavia) Šibenka	08/03/1983	Deutschlandhalle, West Berlin	
1983–84	Orthez (France)	97–73	(Socialist Federal Republic of Yugoslavia) Crvena zvezda	15/03/1984	Palais des Sports Pierre-de-Coubertin, Paris	
1987–88	Real Madrid (Spain)	195–183 (two-leg)	(Socialist Federal Republic of Yugoslavia) Cibona	01 & 09/03/1988	Palacio de Deportes..., Madrid	Košarkaški centar Cibona, Zagreb
1988–89	Partizan (Socialist Federal Republic of Yugoslavia)	177–171 (two-leg)	(Italy) Wiwa Vismara Cantù	16 & 22/03/1989	Palasport Pianella, Cucciago	Hala sportova, Belgrade
1997–98	Mash Jeans Verona (Italy)	141–138 (two-leg)	(Federal Republic of Yugoslavia) Crvena zvezda	25/03 & 01/04/1998	PalaOlimpia, Verona	Hala Pionir, Belgrade
2000–01	Unicaja (Spain)	148–116 (two-leg)	(Federal Republic of Yugoslavia) Hemofarm	11 & 18/04/2001	Palacio de Deportes..., Málaga	Centar Millennium, Vršac

== EuroLeague (1st-tier), since 1958 to 2005–06 season ==
=== Season to season ===
Year	Team	_______ Earlier stage _______	________ Last 24 to 32 ________	________ Last 12 to 16 ________	_________ Last 6 to 8 _________	_________ Semifinals _________	____________ Final ____________
1958	AŠK Olimpija		(Turkey) Modaspor	(Bulgaria) Academic			
1958–59	OKK Beograd			(Greece) AEK	(France) Étoile Charleville-Mézières	(Bulgaria) Academic	
1959–60	AŠK Olimpija			(Austria) Union Babenberg	(Soviet Union) Rīgas ASK		
1960–61	OKK Beograd		(Sweden) KFUM Söder	(Belgium) Antwerpse			
1961–62	AŠK Olimpija		(Austria) Engelmann Wien	(West Germany) USC Heidelberg	(Belgium) Antwerpse	(Spain) Real Madrid	
1962–63	AŠK Olimpija		(Israel) Maccabi Tel Aviv	(France) Alsace de Bagnolet	(Czechoslovakia) Spartak ZJŠ Brno		
1963–64	OKK Beograd		(Bulgaria) Academic	(France) PUC	Bye	(Czechoslovakia) Spartak ZJŠ Brno	
1964–65	OKK Beograd			(Sweden) Alvik	(Greece) AEK	(Spain) Real Madrid	
1965–66	Zadar			(Romania) Dinamo București	4th of 4 teams		
1966–67	AŠK Olimpija			(Netherlands) Herly Amsterdam	2nd of 4 teams	(Spain) Real Madrid	(Czechoslovakia) Slavia VŠ Praha
1967–68	Zadar		(Hungary) Honvéd	(Greece) Panathinaikos	1st of 4 teams	(Spain) Real Madrid	
1968–69	Zadar			(France) ASVEL	3rd of 4 teams		
1969–70	Crvena zvezda		(Luxembourg) Sparta Bertrange	(Greece) Panathinaikos	4th of 4 teams		
1970–71	AŠK Olimpija		(Netherlands) Fiat Stars	(Poland) Śląsk Wrocław	3rd of 4 teams		
1971–72	Jugoplastika		(United Arab Republic) Al-Gezira	(Albania) 17 Nëntori	1st of 4 teams	(Spain) Real Madrid	(Italy) Ignis Varese
1972–73	Crvena zvezda		(Netherlands) Levi's Flamingo's	(Albania) Partizani Tirana	2nd of 4 teams	(Soviet Union) CSKA Moscow	
1973–74	Radnički Belgrade		(Luxembourg) Amicale Steinsel	(Sweden) Solna IF	2nd of 4 teams	(Italy) Ignis Varese	
1974–75	Zadar			2nd of 6 teams	Bye	(Spain) Real Madrid	
1975–76	Zadar			6th of 6 teams			
1976–77	Partizan		2nd of 4 teams				
1977–78	Jugoplastika		1st of 4 teams	Bye	5th of 6 teams		
1978–79	Bosna		1st of 4 teams	Bye	2nd of 6 teams	Bye	(Italy) Emerson Varese
1979–80	Partizan		1st of 4 teams	Bye	6th of 6 teams		
1979–80	Bosna		1st of 3 teams	Bye	3rd of 6 teams		
1980–81	Bosna		1st of 4 teams	Bye	4th of 6 teams		
1981–82	Partizan		1st of 4 teams	Bye	3rd of 6 teams		
1982–83	Cibona		(Egypt) Union Récréation Alexandria	(Hungary) Honvéd	6th of 6 teams		
1983–84	Bosna		(Austria) Klosterneuburg	(England) Austin Rover Sunderland	4th of 6 teams		
1984–85	Cibona		(Bulgaria) CSKA Sofia	(Finland) NMKY Helsinki	1st of 6 teams	Bye	(Spain) Real Madrid
1985–86	Cibona		(Turkey) Galatasaray	(Austria) Klosterneuburg	1st of 6 teams	Bye	(Soviet Union) Žalgiris
1986–87	Zadar		(Luxembourg) Sparta Bertrange	(Bulgaria) Levski-Spartak	4th of 6 teams		
1987–88	Partizan			(Hungary) Körmendi Dózsa	1st of 8 teams	(Israel) Maccabi Elite Tel Aviv	(Greece) Aris
1988–89	Jugoplastika			(Portugal) Ovarense	3rd of 8 teams	(Spain) FC Barcelona	(Israel) Maccabi Elite Tel Aviv
1989–90	Jugoplastika			(Scotland) MIM Livingston	2nd of 8 teams	(France) Limoges CSP	(Spain) FC Barcelona Banca Catalana
1990–91	POP 84			(Turkey) Galatasaray	2nd of 8 teams	(Italy) Scavolini Pesaro	(Spain) FC Barcelona Banca Catalana
1991–92	Partizan		(Hungary) Szolnoki Olajbányász	4th of 8 teams	(Italy) Knorr Bologna	(Italy) Philips Milano	(Spain) Montigalà Joventut
1992–93	Partizan			Not allowed to compete ✝			
1992–93	Crvena zvezda		(Greece) PAOK ✝✝				
1993–94
1994–95
1995–96	Partizan	(Bulgaria) Pleven	(Portugal) Benfica				
1996–97	Partizan	2nd of 6 teams	2nd of 6 teams	(Greece) Olympiacos			
1997–98	Partizan	4th of 6 teams	4th of 6 teams	(Greece) Olympiacos	(Russia) CSKA Moscow	(Italy) Kinder Bologna	(Italy) Benetton Treviso (4th)
1998–99	Crvena zvezda	6th of 6 teams	6th of 6 teams				
1999–00	Budućnost	4th of 6 teams	4th of 6 teams	(Greece) Panathinaikos			
1999–00	Crvena zvezda	6th of 6 teams	6th of 6 teams				
2000–01	Budućnost		3rd of 6 teams	(Spain) Real Madrid Teka			
2000–01	Partizan		3rd of 10 teams	(France) ASVEL			
2001–02	Budućnost		7th of 8 teams				
2001–02	Partizan ICN		6th of 8 teams				
2002–03	Partizan Mobtel		8th of 8 teams				
2002–03	Budućnost		8th of 8 teams				
2003–04	Partizan Mobtel		7th of 8 teams				
2004–05	Partizan Pivara MB		8th of 8 teams				
2005–06	Partizan Pivara MB		8th of 8 teams				

^{✝}Partizan was drawn for the competition but was not allowed to compete due to UN embargo on FR Yugoslavia. FIBA decided not to replace Partizan with another team for the Regular Season Group Stage, so the 15 qualified clubs had to be unevenly distributed in this round (a group of 8 teams and another of only 7). ^{✝✝}Crvena zvezda was drawn for the competition but was not allowed to compete due to UN embargo on FR Yugoslavia. So PAOK went through with a walkover.

== FIBA Saporta Cup (2nd-tier), since 1966–67 to 2001–02 season ==
=== Season to season ===
Year	Team	_______ Earlier stage _______	___________ Last 48 ___________	________ Last 24 to 32 ________	________ Last 12 to 16 ________	_________ Last 6 to 8 _________	_________ Semifinals _________	____________ Final ____________
1966–67	Partizan				(Turkey) İTÜ	(Italy) Ignis Varese		
1967–68	AŠK Olimpija				(Romania) Dinamo București	(Czechoslovakia) Slavia VŠ Praha		
1968–69	AŠK Olimpija			(Turkey) Altınordu	(West Germany) Bayern Munich	(East Germany) TSC Berlin 1893	(Czechoslovakia) Slavia VŠ Praha	
1969–70	Lokomotiva				(Turkey) İTÜ	(Italy) Fides Napoli		
1970–71	Zadar			(Albania) 17 Nëntori Tirana	(Czechoslovakia) Dukla Olomouc	(Soviet Union) Spartak Leningrad		
1971–72	Crvena zvezda			(Finland) Helsingin Kisa-Toverit	(Austria) Handelsministerium	1st of 3 teams	(Spain) Juventud Schweppes	(Italy) Simmenthal Milano
1972–73	Jugoplastika			(Bulgaria) Levski-Spartak	(West Germany) Gießen 46ers	1st of 3 teams	(Italy) Mobilquattro Milano	(Soviet Union) Spartak Leningrad
1973–74	Crvena zvezda			(Albania) 17 Nëntori Tirana	(France) Alsace Bagnolet	1st of 3 teams	(Spain) Estudiantes Monteverde	(Czechoslovakia) Spartak ZJŠ Brno
1974–75	Jugoplastika				(Czechoslovakia) Dukla Olomouc	2nd of 4 teams	(Socialist Federal Republic of Yugoslavia) Crvena zvezda	
1974–75	Crvena zvezda					1st of 4 teams	(Socialist Federal Republic of Yugoslavia) Jugoplastika	(Soviet Union) Spartak Leningrad
1975–76	Rabotnički					1st of 4 teams	(Italy) Cinzano Milano	
1976–77	Radnički Belgrade			(Albania) Partizani Tirana	(Poland) Wybrzeże Gdańsk	1st of 4 teams	(Spain) Juventud Schweppes	(Italy) Birra Forst Cantù
1977–78	Kvarner				(Hungary) Soproni MAFC	4th of 4 teams		
1978–79	Radnički Belgrade			(Turkey) Tofaş	(Czechoslovakia) Dukla Olomouc	3rd of 4 teams		
1979–80	Zadar			(Hungary) Soproni MAFC	(Israel) Hapoel Ramat Gan	3rd of 4 teams		
1980–81	Cibona			(Iceland) Valur	(Austria) Klosterneuburg	2nd of 4 teams	(Spain) FC Barcelona	
1981–82	Cibona					1st of 4 teams	(Soviet Union) Stroitel	(Spain) Real Madrid
1982–83	ZZI Olimpija					2nd of 4 teams	(Italy) Scavolini Pesaro	
1983–84	Cibona			(Denmark) BMS	(Romania) Steaua București	2nd of 4 teams	(Spain) Real Madrid	
1984–85	Bosna				(Greece) PAOK			
1985–86	Jugoplastika			(Bulgaria) CSKA Sofia	(Israel) Maccabi Haifa	3rd of 4 teams		
1986–87	Cibona					1st of 4 teams	(France) ASVEL	(Italy) Scavolini Pesaro
1987–88	IMT				(Austria) Sparkasse Wels	4th of 4 teams		
1988–89	Cibona				(Austria) Scholl Wels	2nd of 4 teams	(Spain) Real Madrid	
1989–90	Partizan				(Cyprus) Apollon Limassol	3rd of 4 teams		
1990–91	Crvena zvezda				(Turkey) Paşabahçe	4th of 4 teams		
1991–92
1992–93	Spartak Subotica		(Romania) Dinamo București ✝					
1993–94
1994–95
1995–96	Spartak Subotica	(Romania) Universitatea Cluj	(Israel) Bnei Herzliya					
1995–96	Partizan			(Israel) Hapoel Galil Elyon	4th of 6 teams			
1996–97	Budućnost		5th of 6 teams					
1997–98	FMP Železnik		3rd of 6 teams	(France) ASVEL				
1997–98	Beobanka		2nd of 6 teams	(Croatia) Zrinjevac	(Italy) Polti Cantù	(Lithuania) Žalgiris		
1998–99	Budućnost		2nd of 6 teams	(Greece) AEK	(Slovakia) Slovakofarma Pezinok	(Turkey) Tofaş	(Italy) Benetton Treviso	
1998–99	Partizan		1st of 6 teams	(Latvia) ASK Brocēni	(Turkey) Türk Telekom	(Italy) Benetton Treviso		
1999–00	Partizan		5th of 6 teams					
1999–00	Radnički Belgrade		4th of 6 teams	(Turkey) Darüşşafaka				
2000–01	Crvena zvezda			3rd of 6 teams	(Belgium) Telindus Antwerpen			
2001–02	FMP Železnik			3rd of 6 teams	(Germany) Telekom Baskets Bonn			

^{✝}Spartak Subotica was drawn for the competition but was not allowed to compete due to UN embargo on FR Yugoslavia. So Dinamo București went through with a walkover.

== EuroCup (2nd-tier), since 2002–03 to 2005–06 season ==
=== Season to season ===
Year	Team	_______ Earlier stage _______	___________ Last 48 ___________	________ Last 24 to 32 ________	___________ Last 16 ___________	___________ Last 8 ___________	_________ Semifinals _________	____________ Final ____________
2002–03	FMP Železnik			1st of 6 teams	(Italy) Generali Trieste	(Spain) DKV Joventut		
2003–04	Reflex		1st of 6 teams	Bye	(Latvia) Ventspils	(Spain) DKV Joventut	(Israel) Hapoel Migdal Jerusalem	
2003–04	Crvena zvezda		4th of 6 teams					
2003–04	Budućnost		4th of 6 teams					
2003–04	Atlas		5th of 6 teams					
2004–05	Hemofarm		2nd of 6 teams	Bye	(Russia) Dynamo Moscow	(Latvia) Ventspils	(Greece) Makedonikos	
2004–05	Crvena zvezda		3rd of 6 teams					
2004–05	Reflex		4th of 6 teams					
2004–05	Budućnost		5th of 6 teams					
2005–06	Hemofarm			2nd of 6 teams	(Spain) Etosa Alicante	(Italy) Landi Renzo Reggio Emilia	(Greece) Aris TT Bank	
2005–06	FMP			2nd of 6 teams	(France) Adecco ASVEL			
2005–06	Crvena zvezda			3rd of 6 teams	(Bulgaria) Lukoil Academic	(Russia) Dynamo Moscow		

== FIBA Korać Cup (3rd-tier), since 1972 to 2001–02 season ==
=== Season to season ===
Year	Team	_______ Earlier stage _______	________ Last 64 to 48 ________	________ Last 24 to 32 ________	________ Last 12 to 16 ________	_________ Last 6 to 8 _________	_________ Semifinals _________	____________ Final ____________
1972	Lokomotiva					(France) Caen	(Belgium) Standard Liège	(Socialist Federal Republic of Yugoslavia) OKK Beograd
1972	OKK Beograd					(West Germany) USC München	(France) Olympique Antibes	(Socialist Federal Republic of Yugoslavia) Lokomotiva
1973	Lokomotiva				2nd of 3 teams			
1973	Rabotnički				3rd of 3 teams			
1973–74	Partizan			(Greece) YMCA Thessaloniki	1st of 3 teams	Bye	(Socialist Federal Republic of Yugoslavia) Jugoplastika	(Italy) Birra Forst Cantù
1973–74	Borac Čačak		(Italy) Innocenti Milano					
1973–74	AŠK Olimpija		(Switzerland) Union Neuchâtel	(Belgium) Maes Pils	2nd of 3 teams			
1973–74	Jugoplastika		(France) Denain Voltaire	(Bulgaria) Balkan Botevgrad	1st of 3 teams	Bye	(Socialist Federal Republic of Yugoslavia) Partizan	
1974–75	Bosna		(Netherlands) Typsoos Lions	(Greece) PAOK	2nd of 4 teams			
1974–75	Partizan		(Switzerland) Vevey	(France) Caen	1st of 4 teams	Bye	(Italy) Birra Forst Cantù	
1975–76	Jugoplastika			(Greece) Panellinios	1st of 4 teams	Bye	(Italy) Sinudyne Bologna	(Italy) Chinamartini Torino
1975–76	Partizan				2nd of 4 teams			
1976–77	Jugoplastika				1st of 3 teams	Bye	(Italy) IBP Stella Azzurra	(Italy) Alco Bologna
1976–77	Bosna		(Greece) Iraklis	(Bulgaria) CSKA Septemvriisko zname	2nd of 3 teams			
1977–78	Bosna			(Turkey) İTÜ	1st of 4 teams	Bye	(Italy) Cinzano Milano	(Socialist Federal Republic of Yugoslavia) Partizan
1977–78	Partizan			(Belgium) Anderlecht	1st of 4 teams	Bye	(Spain) Juventud Freixenet	(Socialist Federal Republic of Yugoslavia) Bosna
1977–78	Cibona			(Israel) Hapoel Ramat Gan	3rd of 4 teams			
1977–78	Beko Beograd			(Austria) Progress Graz	2nd of 4 teams			
1978–79	Partizan				1st of 4 teams	Bye	(Socialist Federal Republic of Yugoslavia) Jugoplastika	(Italy) Arrigoni Rieti
1978–79	Jugoplastika			(Switzerland) Vevey	1st of 4 teams	Bye	(Socialist Federal Republic of Yugoslavia) Partizan	
1978–79	Iskra Olimpija			(Switzerland) Pully	3rd of 4 teams			
1978–79	Cibona			(England) Stockport Belgrade	3rd of 4 teams			
1979–80	Jugoplastika				1st of 4 teams	Bye	(Italy) Arrigoni Rieti	
1979–80	Cibona			(Turkey) Ziraat Fakültesi	1st of 4 teams	Bye	(Israel) Hapoel Tel Aviv	(Italy) Arrigoni Rieti
1979–80	Borac Čačak			(Belgium) CEPF	3rd of 4 teams			
1979–80	Radnički Belgrade			(Israel) Hapoel Tel Aviv				
1980–81	Jugoplastika				3rd of 4 teams			
1980–81	Partizan			(France) Caen	2nd of 4 teams			
1980–81	Crvena zvezda			(Greece) Sporting	1st of 4 teams	Bye	(Spain) Joventut Freixenet	
1980–81	Zadar			(Turkey) Beşiktaş	3rd of 4 teams			
1981–82	Zadar			(Greece) PAOK	1st of 4 teams	Bye	(France) Limoges CSP	
1981–82	Šibenka			(Israel) Hapoel Tel Aviv	1st of 4 teams	Bye	(Socialist Federal Republic of Yugoslavia) Crvena zvezda	(France) Limoges CSP
1981–82	Crvena zvezda				1st of 4 teams	Bye	(Socialist Federal Republic of Yugoslavia) Šibenka	
1981–82	Iskra Olimpija			(Italy) Acqua Fabia Rieti				
1982–83	Partizan				3rd of 4 teams			
1982–83	Crvena zvezda		(Turkey) Tofaş	(Italy) Carrera Venezia	3rd of 4 teams			
1982–83	Zadar		(Cyprus) Keravnos	(Switzerland) Pully	1st of 4 teams	Bye	(Socialist Federal Republic of Yugoslavia) Šibenka	
1982–83	Šibenka				1st of 4 teams	Bye	(Socialist Federal Republic of Yugoslavia) Zadar	(France) Limoges CSP
1983–84	Šibenka				4th of 4 teams			
1983–84	Partizan			(Turkey) Eczacıbaşı				
1983–84	Crvena zvezda			(Belgium) Binet Verviers-Pepinster	1st of 4 teams	Bye	(Spain) CAI Zaragoza	(France) Orthez
1983–84	Zadar			(Belgium) Standard Liège	2nd of 4 teams			
1984–85	Crvena zvezda				1st of 4 teams	Bye	(Italy) Simac Milano	
1984–85	Zadar			(Greece) Aris				
1984–85	Šibenka			(Israel) Hapoel Haifa				
1984–85	Borac Čačak			(Turkey) Fenerbahçe				
1985–86	Crvena zvezda				2nd of 4 teams			
1985–86	Zadar		(Cyprus) APOEL	(Greece) Panionios	3rd of 4 teams			
1985–86	Bosna				3rd of 4 teams			
1985–86	Partizan		(Luxembourg) Contern	(West Germany) Charlottenburg	3rd of 4 teams			
1986–87	Budućnost			(Turkey) Karşıyaka	4th of 4 teams			
1986–87	Šibenka		(England) Portsmouth	(Hungary) ZTE	4th of 4 teams			
1986–87	Partizan			(Greece) PAOK	2nd of 4 teams			
1986–87	Jugoplastika		(Belgium) CEPF	(Switzerland) Fribourg Olympic	4th of 4 teams			
1987–88	Cibona			(Finland) KTP	1st of 4 teams	Bye	(Israel) Hapoel Tel Aviv	(Spain) Real Madrid
1987–88	Jugoplastika		(Hungary) Honvéd	(Turkey) Beslen Makarna	3rd of 4 teams			
1987–88	Crvena zvezda			(Turkey) Beşiktaş	1st of 4 teams	Bye	(Spain) Real Madrid	
1987–88	Šibenka		(Israel) Elitzur Netanya					
1988–89	Partizan			(Bulgaria) Levski-Spartak	1st of 4 teams	Bye	(Socialist Federal Republic of Yugoslavia) Zadar	(Italy) Wiwa Vismara Cantù
1988–89	Smelt Olimpija		(Greece) Panionios	(Spain) Estudiantes Bosé				
1988–89	Zadar			(Turkey) Efes Pilsen	1st of 4 teams	Bye	(Socialist Federal Republic of Yugoslavia) Partizan	
1988–89	Crvena zvezda		(Turkey) Fenerbahçe	(Greece) PAOK	2nd of 4 teams			
1989–90	Bosna		(Turkey) Fenerbahçe	(Belgium) Bobcat Gent	2nd of 4 teams	(Turkey) Efes Pilsen	(Spain) Ram Joventut	
1989–90	Crvena zvezda		(Greece) Iraklis Thessaloniki					
1989–90	Zadar		(Bulgaria) Spartak Pleven	(Belgium) Maccabi Brussels	3rd of 4 teams			
1989–90	Smelt Olimpija		(Israel) Hapoel Galil Elyon	(Italy) Benetton Treviso	4th of 4 teams			
1990–91	Zadar			(Soviet Union) Kalev	1st of 4 teams	(France) Mulhouse		
1990–91	Cibona			(Soviet Union) SKA Alma-Ata	2nd of 4 teams	(Italy) Shampoo Clear Cantù		
1990–91	Vojvodina		(Netherlands) VGNN Donar	(Italy) Shampoo Clear Cantù				
1990–91	Smelt Olimpija		(East Germany) Magdeburg	(Israel) Hapoel Tel Aviv				
1991–92	Vojvodina		(Austria) Citroën Klagenfurt	(Greece) Panathinaikos				
1991–92	Bosna		(Cyprus) AEL Limassol	(Greece) Nikas Peristeri				
1992–93	Sloboda Užice		(Hungary) MOL Szolnoki Olajbányász ✝					
1992–93	Radnički Belgrade		(Ukraine) Stroitel Kharkov ✝					
1992–93	Budućnost		(Belgium) Sunair Oostende ✝					
1993–94
1994–95
1995–96	Borovica		(Sweden) Magic M7	(Greece) Panionios Afisorama				
1995–96	Crvena zvezda	(Russia) Akvarius Volgograd						
1995–96	Vojvodina		(Germany) Brandt Hagen	(Spain) Festina Andorra				
1995–96	BFC Beočin	(Austria) Möllersdorf Traiskirchen	(Lithuania) Šiauliai					
1996–97	Iva Zorka Pharma Šabac	(Albania) Partizani Tirana	2nd of 4 teams	(Poland) Mazowzanka				
1996–97	Beobanka	(Austria) Stahlbau Oberwart	1st of 4 teams	(Belgium) Trane Castors Braine	(Greece) Aris			
1996–97	Crvena zvezda	(Bulgaria) Kompact Dimitrovgrad	2nd of 4 teams	(Greece) PAOK				
1996–97	Spartak Subotica	(Slovakia) Chemosvit	3rd of 4 teams					
1997–98	Budućnost		2nd of 4 teams	(Lithuania) Statyba	(Greece) Nikas Peristeri			
1997–98	Spartak Subotica	(Bulgaria) Cherno More						
1997–98	Crvena zvezda	(Cyprus) Panathinaikos Limassol	1st of 4 teams	(Italy) Fontanafredda Siena	(Turkey) Darüşşafaka	(Turkey) Kombassan Konya	(France) Cholet	(Italy) Mash Jeans Verona
1997–98	Vojvodina	(North Macedonia) Nemetali Strumica	3rd of 4 teams					
1998–99	FMP Železnik		3rd of 4 teams					
1998–99	Lovćen		3rd of 4 teams					
1998–99	Beobanka		3rd of 4 teams					
1998–99	Radnički Belgrade		2nd of 3 teams	(Sweden) Norrköping Dolphins	(Greece) Panionios			
1999–00
2000–01	Hemofarm		(Cyprus) Apollon Limassol	2nd of 4 teams	(Turkey) Darüşşafaka	(Poland) Prokom Trefl Sopot	(Belgium) Athlon Ieper	(Spain) Unicaja
2000–01	FMP Železnik		(Bulgaria) Yambolgaz 92	4th of 4 teams				
2000–01	NIS Vojvodina		(North Macedonia) MZT Skopje	4th of 4 teams				
2001–02	Zdravlje		(Turkey) Beşiktaş					
2001–02	Hemofarm		(Austria) Mountain Bears Kapfenberg	2nd of 4 teams	(Greece) Maroussi Telestet			

^{✝}Sloboda Užice, Radnički Belgrade and Budućnost were drawn for the competition but were not allowed to compete due to UN embargo on FR Yugoslavia. So MOL Szolnoki Olajbányász, Stroitel Kharkov and Sunair Oostende went through with a walkover.

== See also ==
European basketball clubs in European and worldwide competitions from:

- Croatia
- Czechoslovakia
- France
- Greece
- Israel
- Italy
- Russia
- Spain
- Turkey
- USSR
