= KK Šibenik in international competitions =

KK Šibenik history and statistics in FIBA Europe and Euroleague Basketball (company) competitions.

== European competitions ==
Record	Round	Opponent club		
1981–82 FIBA Korać Cup 3rd–tier
7–4	2nd round	(Israel) Hapoel Tel Aviv	97–101 (a)	98–88 (h)
7–4	Top 16	(Spain) Miñón Valladolid	93–77 (h)	90–108 (a)
7–4	Top 16	(Hungary) Vasas	96–79 (a)	107–81 (h)
7–4	Top 16	(Italy) Acqua Fabia Rieti	95–94 (h)	104–99 (a)
7–4	SF	(Socialist Federal Republic of Yugoslavia) Crvena zvezda	99–115 (a)	101–83 (h)
7–4	F	(France) Limoges CSP	84–90; March 18, Palasport San Lazzaro, Padua	
1982–83 FIBA Korać Cup 3rd–tier
6–3	2nd round	Bye	Šibenka qualified without games	
6–3	Top 16	(Italy) Binova Cucine Rieti	81–80 (a)	104–87 (h)
6–3	Top 16	(France) Orthez	111–95 (h)	74–79 (a)
6–3	Top 16	(West Germany) Bayreuth	85–77 (a)	105–100 (h)
6–3	SF	(Socialist Federal Republic of Yugoslavia) Zadar	70–78 (a)	89–69 (h)
6–3	F	(France) Limoges CSP	86–94; March 8, Deutschlandhalle, West Berlin	
1983–84 FIBA Korać Cup 3rd–tier
1–5	2nd round	Bye	Šibenka qualified without games	
1–5	Top 16	(Italy) Bic Trieste	62–79 (a)	94–78 (h)
1–5	Top 16	(France) Tours	93–99 (a)	83–93 (h)
1–5	Top 16	(Spain) CAI Zaragoza	101–102 (h)	60–106 (a)
1984–85 FIBA Korać Cup 3rd–tier
1–1	2nd round	(Israel) Hapoel Haifa	100–105 (a)	97–94 (h)
1986–87 FIBA Korać Cup 3rd–tier
3–7	1st round	(England) Portsmouth	76–96 (a)	89–62 (h)
3–7	2nd round	(Hungary) ZTE	96–84 (a)	114–81 (h)
3–7	Top 16	(Italy) Arexons Cantù	78–107 (h)	87–97 (a)
3–7	Top 16	(France) Limoges CSP	104–108 (h)	92–111 (a)
3–7	Top 16	(Soviet Union) Spartak Leningrad	69–79 (a)	91–99 (h)
1987–88 FIBA Korać Cup 3rd–tier
0–2	1st round	(Israel) Elitzur Netanya	76–91 (a)	87–102 (h)
1992–93 FIBA Korać Cup 3rd-tier
2–2	2nd round	(Armenia) Urartu	89–62 (h)	84–68 (a)
2–2	3rd round	(Italy) Philips Milano	80–85 (h)	97–113 (a)
1993–94 FIBA Korać Cup 3rd–tier
1–1	1st round	(Germany) EnBW Ludwigsburg	90–88 (h)	79–82 (a)
1994–95 FIBA Korać Cup 3rd–tier
2–2	2nd round	(Ukraine) CSK-Mercury Kyiv	77–70 (a)	99–88 (h)
2–2	3rd round	(France) Pau-Orthez	62–90 (h)	69–78 (a)

== Record ==
KK Šibenik has overall, from 1981–82 (first participation) to 1994–95 (last participation): 23 wins against 27 defeats in 50 games for all the European club competitions.

- EuroLeague
  - FIBA Saporta Cup
    - FIBA Korać Cup: 23–27 (50)

== See also ==
- Yugoslav basketball clubs in European competitions
