= AMG Sebastiani Basket in international competitions =

AMG Sebastiani Basket history and statistics in FIBA Europe and EuroLeague Basketball competitions.

== European competitions ==
Record	Round	Opponent club		
1974–75 FIBA Korać Cup 3rd–tier
8–4	1st round	(West Germany) USC München	101–86 (a)	92–53 (h)
8–4	2nd round	(Belgium) Standard Liège	67–69 (a)	81–65 (h)
8–4	Top 16	(France) ASVEL	60–78 (a)	88–68 (h)
8–4	Top 16	(Bulgaria) Levski-Spartak	83–72 (a)	85–73 (h)
8–4	Top 16	(France) Monaco	89–72 (h)	75–80 (a)
8–4	SF	(Spain) FC Barcelona	63–48 (h)	63–87 (a)
1975–76 FIBA Korać Cup 3rd–tier
3–3	2nd round	Bye	Brina Rieti qualified without games	
3–3	Top 16	(Spain) Juventud Schweppes	100–89 (h)	59–94 (a)
3–3	Top 16	(France) Moderne	94–108 (a)	91–74 (h)
3–3	Top 16	(Belgium) Éveil Monceau	82–90 (a)	92–78 (h)
1978–79 FIBA Korać Cup 3rd–tier
6–3	2nd round	Bye	Arrigoni Rieti qualified without games	
6–3	Top 16	(Czechoslovakia) Inter Slovnaft	85–69 (h)	86–80 (a)
6–3	Top 16	(Socialist Federal Republic of Yugoslavia) Cibona	74–79 (h)	73–71 (a)
6–3	Top 16	(France) Orthez	96–83 (a)	100–69 (h)
6–3	SF	(Spain) Cotonificio	95–108 (a)	87–63 (h)
6–3	F	(Socialist Federal Republic of Yugoslavia) Partizan	98–108; March 20, Hala Pionir, Belgrade	
1979–80 FIBA Korać Cup 3rd–tier
8–1	2nd round	Bye	Arrigoni Rieti qualified without games	
8–1	Top 16	(Greece) Olympiacos	83–72 (h)	97–93 (a)
8–1	Top 16	(Spain) Joventut Freixenet	84–78 (h)	91–79 (a)
8–1	Top 16	(Turkey) Tofaş	98–72 (a)	115–83 (h)
8–1	SF	(Socialist Federal Republic of Yugoslavia) Jugoplastika	86–75 (h)	97–104 (a)
8–1	F	(Socialist Federal Republic of Yugoslavia) Cibona	76–71; March 26, Country Hall du Sart Tilman, Liège	
1980–81 FIBA Korać Cup 3rd–tier
4–2	2nd round	Bye	Ferrarelle Rieti qualified without games	
4–2	Top 16	(Israel) Hapoel Tel Aviv	99–94 (a)	84–80 (h)
4–2	Top 16	(Socialist Federal Republic of Yugoslavia) Crvena zvezda	80–93 (a)	88–92 (h)
4–2	Top 16	(Belgium) Anderlecht	105–80 (h)	72–71 (a)
1981–82 FIBA Korać Cup 3rd–tier
7–3	1st round	(France) Avignon	88–70 (h)	61–76 (a)
7–3	2nd round	(Socialist Federal Republic of Yugoslavia) Iskra Olimpija	86–82 (h)	77–75 (a)
7–3	Top 16	(Hungary) Vasas	98–66 (a)	90–75 (h)
7–3	Top 16	(Spain) Miñón Valladolid	106–93 (h)	92–83 (a)
7–3	Top 16	(Socialist Federal Republic of Yugoslavia) Šibenka	94–95 (a)	99–104 (h)
1982–83 FIBA Korać Cup 3rd–tier
2–4	2nd round	Bye	Binova Cucine Rieti qualified without games	
2–4	Top 16	(Socialist Federal Republic of Yugoslavia) Šibenka	80–81 (h)	87–104 (a)
2–4	Top 16	(West Germany) Bayreuth	77–52 (h)	89–75 (a)
2–4	Top 16	(France) Orthez	97–107 (a)	84–95 (h)

== Record ==
AMG Sebastiani Basket has overall, from 1974 to 1975 (first participation) to 1982–83 (last participation): 38 wins against 20 defeats in 58 games for all the European club competitions.

- EuroLeague: –
  - FIBA Saporta Cup: –
    - FIBA Korać Cup: 38–20 (58)
