= Bogdan Tanjević =

Montenegrin basketball player and coach (born 1947)

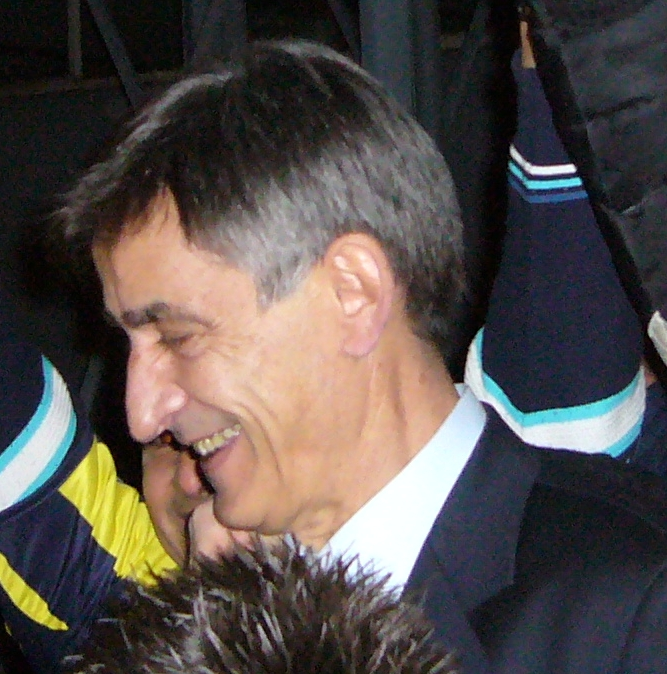
- Tanjević in 2007

Personal information
- Born: 13 February 1947 (age 79) Pljevlja, PR Montenegro, FPR Yugoslavia

Career information
- NBA draft: 1969: undrafted
- Playing career: 1965–1971
- Position: Head coach
- Coaching career: 1971–2017

Career history

Playing
- 1965–1971: OKK Beograd
- 1972: Bosna

Coaching
- 1971–1974: Bosna
- 1975–1980: Bosna
- 1980–1982: Yugoslavia
- 1982–1986: Juventus Caserta
- 1986–1994: Trieste
- 1994–1996: Olimpia Milano
- 1996–1997: Limoges
- 1997–2001: Italy
- 2001: Budućnost
- 2001–2002: ASVEL
- 2002: Virtus Bologna
- 2004–2010: Turkey
- 2007–2010: Fenerbahçe
- 2012–2013: Turkey
- 2015–2017: Montenegro

Career highlights
- As head coach: EuroLeague champion (1979); 2× Yugoslav League (1978, 1980); Italian League champion (1996); FR Yugoslav League champion (2001); French League champion (2002); 2× Turkish League champion (2008, 2010); Yugoslav Cup winner (1978); Italian Cup winner (1996); FR Yugoslav Cup winner (2001); Turkish Cup winner (2010); Turkish Supercup winner (2007); Italian Basketball Hall of Fame (2016)
- FIBA Hall of Fame
Medals
Men's basketball
Representing Yugoslavia
European U-18 Championship
Silver medal – second place	1966 Porto San Giorgio
Head Coach for Yugoslavia
EuroBasket
Silver medal – second place	1981 Czechoslovakia
European U-18 Championship
Gold medal – first place	1974 Orléans
Head Coach for Italy
EuroBasket
Gold medal – first place	1999 France
Head Coach for Turkey
FIBA World Cup
Silver medal – second place	2010 Turkey

Bogdan Tanjević (Serbian Cyrillic: Богдан Тањевић; born 13 February 1947), nicknamed "Boša" (Italian: Boscia) is a Montenegrin professional basketball coach and former player.

He is best known for being KK Bosna's head coach when the club became the top-tier level European-wide champions by winning the FIBA European Champions Cup in the 1978–79 season as well as for coaching the Italian national team to the gold medal at EuroBasket 1999. He was elected to the FIBA Hall of Fame in 2019.

== Early life and career ==
Tanjević was born on 13 February 1947 in Pljevlja, PR Montenegro, FPR Yugoslavia. Four years later, in 1951, four-year-old Bogdan was brought to Sarajevo, PR Bosnia-Herzegovina due to his Yugoslav People's Army (JNA) officer father Strahinja Tanjević getting reassigned there. Growing up in Sarajevo, he spent most of his summers back in Montenegro in his grandfather's village on the slopes of the Ljubišnja mountain near Pljevlja. Attending Veselin Masleša primary school in Sarajevo, young Boša got involved with basketball at the FIS outdoor courts alongside friends such as Uglješa Uzelac and Davorin Popović.

Tanjević began playing organized basketball at the hometown Mlada Bosna Sarajevo.

In 1965, after graduating high school, Tanjević moved to Belgrade where he enrolled at the University of Belgrade's Faculty of Philosophy, studying world literature.

== Club career ==
=== OKK Beograd ===
In parallel with his university studies in Belgrade, young Tanjević played basketball at OKK Beograd on a team alongside established players Radivoj Korać, Trajko Rajković, Slobodan Gordić, and Miodrag Nikolić.

In summer 1971, he parted ways with OKK Beograd, agreeing principal terms with KK Oriolik, a Yugoslav First Basketball League (top-tier) club from Slavonski Brod that had just finished its second-ever top-tier season in 11th place (out of twelve) and was in the process of putting together its roster for the upcoming top league campaign. However, within a month of signing for Oriolik, instead of going to Slavonski Brod, Tanjević decided to abruptly end his playing career at the age of twenty-four by taking the head coaching offer at KK Bosna, a second division club from Sarajevo.

== National team career ==
Despite a four-year run with the Yugoslav national junior (under-18) team, having made the final cut for several FIBA Europe youth competitions from 1964 until 1966 under head coach Ranko Žeravica, Tanjević wasn't able to make the next step and earn a spot on the Yugoslav full squad.

=== Youth ===
Sixteen-year-old Tanjević received his first call up for the Yugoslav junior national team by its head coach Žeravica in 1963. Tanjević later talked of his surprise to have gotten his debut considering he played for a "provincial lower-league club KK Željezničar Sarajevo", commending Žeravica for not favouring players from big established clubs over those from smaller ones.

In spring 1964, sixteen-year-old Tanjević, still with Željezničar at the time, made the Yugoslav junior team for the European Championship for Juniors in Naples in April 1964. As the youngest player on that roster, he had to fight hard for his spot until the very last training camp game, just edging out Staša Đorđević of Radnički Belgrade for the 12th roster spot. Consisting of youngsters most of whom wouldn't later go on to notable basketball careers (Ljubiša Janjić, Anton Bračun, Ljubiša Stanković, Srđan Skulić, Miljenko Valcić, Slobodan Jelić, Tihomir Pavlović, Jurica Kosta, Danko Hočevar, Momčilo Pazmanj, and Andrej Brenk), the Yugoslav team lost 3 of its 5 games at the championship. Tanjević got very little playing time, without managing to score a single basket at the competition.

In summer 1966, 19-year-old Tanjević, now an OKK Beograd player, was selected for the Yugoslav junior team sent to the European Championship for Juniors in Porto San Giorgio on the Italian Adriatic coast in late August 1966. Unlike two years earlier when he mostly sat on the bench, this time Tanjević actually got a bit of playing time on a roster alongside players that would go on to reach great heights in the game of basketball such as Krešimir Ćosić, Aljoša Žorga, Duci Simonović, Damir Šolman, Kosta Grubor, Dragiša Vučinić, Dragan Kapičić, etc. Yugoslavia made it to the final, but suffered a 21-point blowout by Soviet Union in the gold medal game. For his part, Tanjević appeared in all five games Yugoslavia played at the championship, recording a modest output of 2.4 points per game.

== Club coaching career ==
=== KK Bosna ===
In 1971, twenty-four-year-old Tanjević got named as head coach of KK Bosna, a club playing in the second-tier Yugoslav Second Federal League.

The appointment happened quite abruptly as Tanjević, an active player still, had just agreed on the terms of his transfer to KK Oriolik from Slavonski Brod. Having a whole month before going to Slavonski Brod to finalize the transfer and sign the necessary paperwork, Tanjević spent time in Sarajevo by frequenting KK Bosna's daily summer training sessions, a second-tier club with a batch of young players preparing for its upcoming Second Federal League season. Quite unexpectedly, within weeks, young Tanjević got offered the head coaching position at Bosna by the club's brass who liked the young man's vocal nature and enthusiasm. After months of wrangling during which he had to re-arrange different details of his personal and professional lives, he decided to quit playing basketball at the age of twenty-four and take the unexpected head coaching offer.

==== 1971–72: Gaining promotion ====
Inheriting a roster of youngsters such as nineteen-year-old Žarko Varajić, Anto Đogić, Rođeni Krvavac, twenty-one-year-old center Zdravko Čečur, Jovo Terzić, twenty-two-year-old Mirsad Milavić, Milan Pavlić, Slobodan Pejović, and Aleksandar Nadaždin, Tanjević brought in twenty-two-year-old guard Svetislav Pešić on loan from Partizan Belgrade and Bruno Soče, also arriving from Belgrade. Furthermore, the head coach sought to establish authority over players only a couple of years younger than him. To that end he re-hauled the training regiment, instituting practice sessions twice a day while introducing strict discipline.

The new approach produced immediate results as the club managed to gain promotion in Tanjević's first season. The promotion was secured in dramatic fashion in a single-game playoff against city rivals KK Željezničar because the two clubs sat atop the Second League's west division, having split the regular season home-and-away series, so it was decided that a single game (the so-called majstorica) would determine which team gets promoted. Played on 28 April 1972 in front of 7,000 spectators at the Skenderija Hall, only two weeks after the same venue hosted the iconic Yugoslav partisan film Valter brani Sarajevo premiere, the game was a tense affair. KK Bosna, that saw its 25-year-old head coach Tanjević suit up and play 20 minutes after a whole season of not playing competitive basketball, ended up winning 65–59 behind Pešić's 26 points. It was a historic success for KK Bosna that prior to Tanjević's arrival spent 16 seasons stuck in the Second Federal League, unable to overcome the last hurdle before the top-tier First Federal League.

==== 1972–73: Delibašić signs; club's and coach's top-flight debut ====
Over the summer of 1972, preparing for its first ever top-flight campaign, the newly promoted club pulled off a remarkable coup by bringing in eighteen-year-old top prospect Mirza Delibašić from Sloboda Tuzla, in the process beating out bigger Yugoslav clubs such as KK Partizan for the youngster's signature. The signing was preceded by a year-long recruitment courtship that culminated during the summer. Knowing Partizan already managed to get KK Sloboda's agreement to release Delibašić, Bosna management intensified their direct approach to the player on two fronts — Bosna sports society president Vukašin "Vule" Vukalović made frequent visits to Delibašić's parents cajoling them with financial terms while the team's young coach, only 7 years Delibašić's senior, essentially stalked the player during his training camp for the upcoming European Championship for Juniors in Zadar, eventually befriending and persuading him that Bosna would be the best fit for him. Furthermore, the club managed to buy out Pešić from Partizan for a DM10,000 transfer fee. Just before the season began, Bosna also brought in Ratko Radovanović, a tall and raw sixteen-year-old from Nikšić who hadn't even played organized basketball up to that point, however, liking the teenager's size and motor skills, Tanjević believed he could be molded into a good player, a move that would pay dividends a few years later.

Playing their debut season in the country's top-tier competition, Tanjević's young Bosna team finished in 12th spot (out of 14 clubs) with a 10–16 record. Though in the end they avoided relegation comfortably, it wasn't without a fight, at one point recording nine straight league losses, all of which was considered disappointing. Bosna's losing streak included a 77-94 home loss to the city rivals KK Željezničar (that still managed to gain promotion to the top-tier league despite the previous season's promotion playoff loss due to the league expanding by two teams). The game, first ever meeting of two Sarajevo-based teams in the country's top-tier league, was played on 17 December 1972 in Skenderija's small hall in front of 1,500 spectators due to the main hall already being booked for a commercial fair. During the season's low point, after finally ending the nine-game losing streak, the level of deflation among the team's fans was such that Tanjević got approached by Oslobođenje journalist Kemal Kurspahić with an offer of addressing the public directly via an op-ed of sorts in the city's only daily newspaper — Tanjević accepted, penning a piece urging fans not to give up on the team and boldly predicting a league title in the 1976–77 season. With the skillful young players on its roster led by the country's most sought-after young talent Delibašić, many expected Bosna to be more than just mere relegation battlers. Delibašić who contributed with 15.8 points per game over the 26-game season, already the target of criticism over his shaky defensive displays throughout the season, publicly admitted disappointment with the team's overall performance as well as his own in particular while expressing confidence that the team still has title potential.

==== 1973–74: Achieving a European spot ====
The following season, 1973–74, the team made remarkable progress with a 14–12 record that was good enough for the 4th spot (their record was identical with KK Partizan and Radnički Belgrade, but Bosna had a better head-to-head record). It was another historic result because it meant that Bosna would compete in Europe the following season for the first time in its history.

==== 1974–75: A year-long army stint ====
After coaching the Yugoslavia junior national team and winning gold at the European Championship for Juniors during summer of 1974 in Orléans, 27-year-old Tanjević went away to serve his mandatory Yugoslav People's Army (JNA) stint, temporarily handing the head coaching position at Bosna over to Luka Stančić from Valjevo who took over for the entire 1974–75 season.

The combination of Tanjević's absence and the pressures of playing in Europe reflected badly on team's domestic league performance as Bosna finished the season in somewhat disappointing 7th place with a 12–14 record. On the other hand, they posted notable success in the FIBA Korać Cup, making the quarterfinals where they got eliminated over two legs by Ranko Žeravica's FC Barcelona — after winning by eight points 81–73 at home behind Varajić's 24 points, Delibašić's 16 (though he fouled out in 32nd minute), Pešić's 15, and Čečur's 13 in front of a 7,000-strong raucous crowd at Skenderija on 5 February 1975, they couldn't hold on to the lead away a week later, losing by fourteen 80–66.

==== 1975–76: Return ====
With Tanjević's return from the army, the team also returned to form, finishing the league in 3rd spot with an 18–8 record, just behind Partizan and Jugoplastika.

Having been groomed by Tanjević over the previous years for a main role at the center position, the season saw the full maturation of lanky nineteen-year-old Ratko Radovanović who contributed with 13.3ppg, largely joining Delibašić and Varajić as the team's main offensive threats and squeezing center Zdravko Čečur out of the squad in the process. Though liking Čečur's hustle and willingness to sacrifice his body, Tanjević largely considered him a liability due to his continual lack of fitness and looked to decrease the team's reliance on him under the basket by bringing up young Radovanović who in addition to better agility also had a height advantage over Čečur.

==== 1976–77: Letting the Yugoslav title slip ====
Bosna led the league comfortably most of the season. With three games to go until the end, they were top of the table, two games ahead of the second-placed Petar Skansi-coached KK Split (Jugoplastika) that was coming to Sarajevo for a scheduled league game between two teams. Bosna won their previous contest in Split during first half of the season by 15 points. Going into the Sarajevo game, KK Split players seemed conciliatory, already pronouncing Bosna new champion in their press sound bytes. Bosna players, on the other hand, brimmed with confidence having just recorded a big away win versus KK Partizan, another title contender, on their home court in Belgrade. However, in what was something of an upset, KK Split pulled out a notable away win at Skenderija, getting within only one game behind Bosna. Next fixture, second last of the season, saw Bosna go to play KK Zadar away and lose, which combined with Split winning meant a tie at the top. The final week changed nothing as both teams won their respective games, finishing with identical 23–3 records.

The league title was thus decided in a single-game playoff at Belgrade's Hala Pionir where despite leading for most of the second half, and even having an 8 point lead with three minutes to go, Bosna ended up losing 98–96 courtesy of Damir Šolman's last second buzzer beater — a crushing defeat along with a feeling that they let the title slip through their fingers.

==== 1977–78: Yugoslav title, FIBA Korać Cup final ====
With the pain and frustration of the previous season hanging over the team as it prepared for the upcoming league campaign, Tanjević's Bosna parted ways with center Zdravko Čečur (who had been seeing his role at the five position gradually reduced ever since the ascent of young Radovanović) and point guard Vjećeslav Tolj (local Sarajevo favourite who decided to retire). On the other hand, the squad was set to benefit from the return of shooting guard Svetislav Pešić from his year-long JNA stint.

Bosna began the league season sluggishly, losing unexpectedly in week 3 away at KK Brest Olimpija 80-76. The loss was even more perplexing considering Olympia played without its best player Krešimir Ćosić, with its young guards Jože Papič and Marko Gvardijančić outplaying Bosna's established stars Delibašić and Varajić. Week 5 brought Tanjević's team the chance for revenge for the previous season's panful loss with Jugoplastika arriving to Skenderija—in front of packed stands with 5,000 people in attendance, Bosna entered the contest with lots of nerves but managed to settle down in the second half, winning comfortably in the end 92-84 behind Delibašić's 32 points. By week 9, Bosna separated at the top of the league with an 8-1 record; Jugoplastika and Partizan were in close pursuit with 7-2. The league competition paused for two weeks for the annual Balkan Basketball Championship featuring national teams of Yugoslavia, Greece, Bulgaria, Romania, and Turkey. Coming back to league competition, Bosna players again started slow out of the gates in a nervy home game versus Cibona—despite leading for most of the contest, Bosna never managed to put away the visitors who, led by Andro Knego, took the lead down the stretch, pulling off a great upset. League chasers Partizan and Jugoplastika thus joined Bosna at the top of the league standings. The leader of the first half the league season would thus be decided in week 12 with Partizan arriving to Skenderija. In a spectacular game in front of 7,000 fans, Bosna took the early lead but the Belgrade visitors came back to overturn the score and win 102-107 with their stars Dražen Dalipagić and Dragan Kićanović (who played on four fouls since the 25th minute of the contest) scoring 43 and 34 points, respectively, and securing the leading position halfway through the league season.

The beginning of the second part of the league season began with two uncomfortable and nervy away trips for Tanjević's team: first to Valjevo where the Sarajevans barely managed to overcome KK Metalac in the last two minutes of the game and then to Rijeka where KK Kvarner was no less resilient and it took a lot of effort from Bosna stars Delibašić, Varajić, and Radovanović to pull out a 100-103 win. Jugoplastika beating Partizan in Split allowed Bosna to catch up to Partizan at the top of the league table. Week 17 brought another spectacular game with Bosna travelling to Split for an away clash against old rivals Jugoplastika: with a lot on the line in front of a hostile home crowd at Gripe Hall in a televised event that attracted a large TV audience, the contest featured many lead changes as Jugoplastika led 100-93 few minutes until the end as Bosna managed a 0-10 run and eventually won 108-114. With six games left in the league season, every single week featured great drama. Travelling away to Čačak, Bosna eked out a 111-118 overtime win versus Borac followed by another difficult away match, this time in Zagreb where they defeated Cibona 89-92. The title was decided in a game that saw Bosna travel to Belgrade to play Partizan on 24 March 1978. The game took place only three days after the same two teams contested the Korac Cup final in Banja Luka and considering Partizan won that game as well as the one back in the first half of the league season, the Belgrade team also entered this contest as a favourite. However, Bosna proved resilient, managing to put in a great performance and lead for most of the game. At the very end with Partizan trailing by two points, Delibašić kept his cool to score on two crucial free-throws as Bosna won 102-109 and almost secured the title. For the title to be mathematically secured, Bosna had to win the last game of the league season at home against KK Radnički on 27 March 1978. Played in front of the sold-out Skenderija packed with 7,000 eager fans, the contest was never in doubt with Bosna up by 17 at the half and eventually winning 110-88 behind Varajić's 34 points and Delibašić adding 26. In the end, Yugoslav champions Bosna finished the league season with a 23–3 record, two games ahead of second-place Ranko Žeravica-coached KK Partizan's 21–5.

Simultaneously, the same two teams made the FIBA Korać Cup final played on 21 March 1978 in Banja Luka's Borik Hall—Bosna's first-ever European final. In a game of great quality in front of 6,000 fans, the score at the end of regulation was tied 101–101, requiring overtime in which Bosna succumbed 110–117 to Partizan team that got a great contribution from its stars Dražen Dalipagić and Dragan Kićanović with 48 and 33 points, respectively.

==== 1978–79: European champion ====
The crown of Tanjević's rich sporting career came on 5 April 1979, at Palais des Sports, in Grenoble, when KK Bosna, under his command, became the FIBA European Cup Champions (EuroLeague) champions, by winning the 1978–79 FIBA European Champions Cup.

=== ASVEL ===
Tanjević signed a three-year contract with ASVEL in July 2001.

He got fired by the club president Gilles Moretton after only a season in April 2002. The dismissal led to Tanjević suing the club for breach of contract, seeking €1.5 million in damages.

== National team coaching ==
=== Yugoslavia ===
==== Youth ====
In 1974, KK Bosna head coach Tanjević was appointed head coach of the Yugoslavia Juniors that ended up winning the gold medal at the FIBA Europe Under-18 Championship in France.

==== Assistant coach ====
Between 1977 and 1980, Tanjević was an assistant coach of the Yugoslavia national team under Aleksandar Nikolić, Petar Skansi, and Ranko Žeravica.

==== Head coach ====
In 1981, Tanjević was the head coach of Yugoslavia that won the silver medal at the FIBA European Championship in Czechoslovakia.

=== Italy ===
Tanjević was the head coach of the Italy national team between 1997 and 2000.

=== Turkey ===
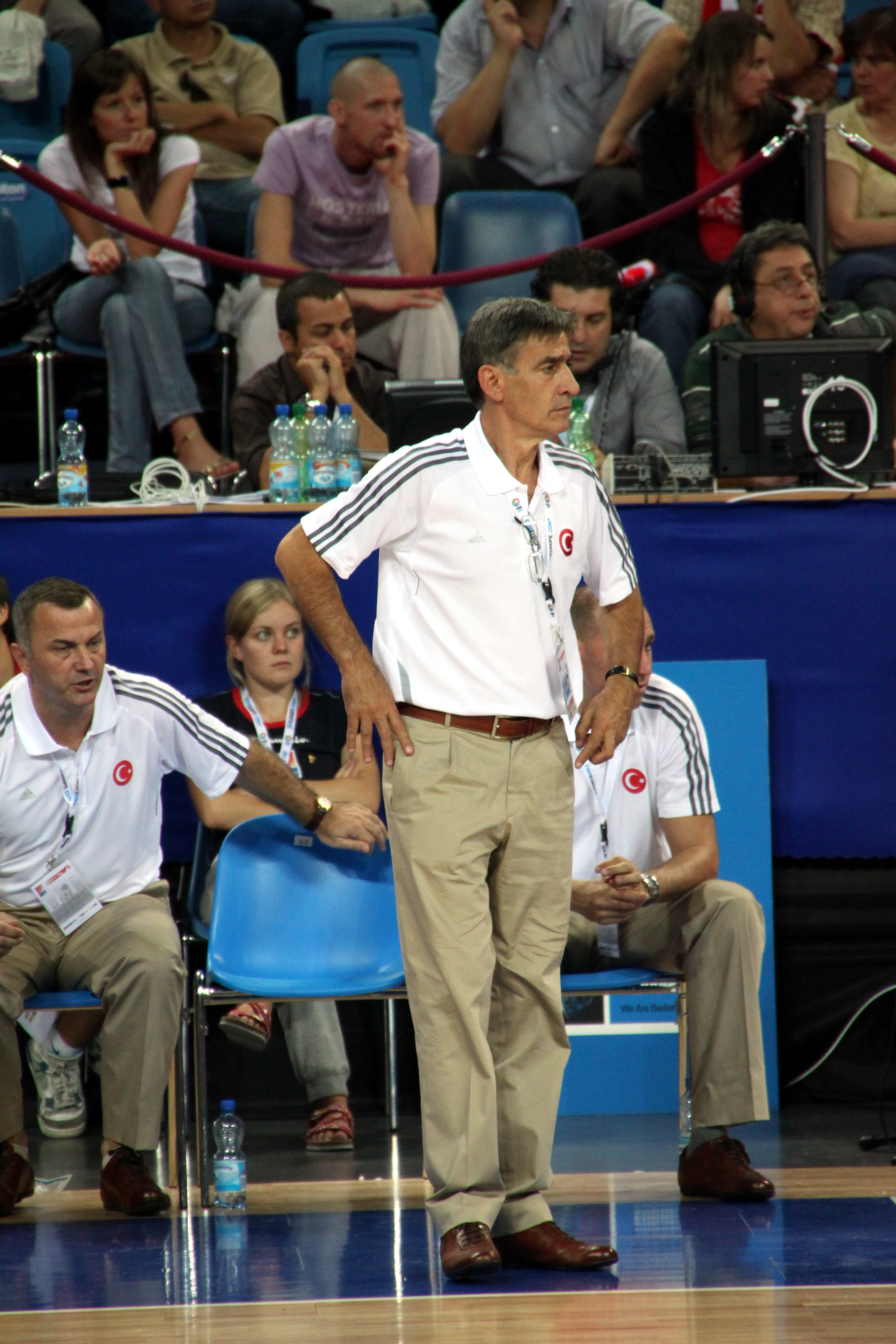
Tanjević coaching Turkey at EuroBasket 2009

Tanjević was the head coach of the Turkey national team between 2004 and 2013.

=== Montenegro ===
Tanjević was the head coach of the Montenegro national team between 2015 and 2017.

== Club titles and medals ==
=== National Championships ===
- Won the 1977–78 Yugoslav National Championship with Bosna Sarajevo
- Won the 1979–80 Yugoslav National Championship with Bosna Sarajevo
- Won the 1995–96 Italian National Championship with Olimpia Milano
- Won the 2000–01 Yugoslav National Championship with Buducnost Podgorica
- Won the 2001–02 French National Championship with Asvel Villeurbanne
- Won the 2007–08 Turkish Super League with Fenerbahçe
- Won the 2009–10 Turkish Super League with Fenerbahçe

=== National Cups ===
- Won the 1996 Italian National Cup with Olimpia Milano
- Won the 2001 Yugoslav National Cup with Budocnost
- Won the 2010 Turkish National Cup with Fenerbahçe

=== International club competitions ===
- Won the 1978–79 EuroLeague with Bosna Sarajevo

=== Others ===
- Won the 2007 Turkish President's Cup with Fenerbahçe

=== National team competitions ===
- Won the gold medal at the 1974 European Junior Championship with Yugoslavia
- Won the gold medal at the EuroBasket 1999 with Italy
- Won the silver medal at the EuroBasket 1981 with Yugoslavia
- Won the silver medal at the 2010 FIBA World Championship with Turkey

== Investments ==
Since 2016, Tanjević has been investing in the energy sector in Montenegro via owning a partnership stake in Barsolar, a Bar-based limited liability company that lists electric power generation, transmission, and distribution as its activities. In addition to Tanjević, the other two partners with ownership stake in the venture are the former head of the Montenegrin government's Department for Energy Efficiency and Renewable Energy Sources, Igor Kovačević and Turkish company Consus enerji isletmeciligi ve hizmetleri anonym sirketi.

In late January 2020, the Montenegrin government's Regulatory Energy Agency (REA) granted Tanjević's company—specifically, its solar energy facility in Bar—the status of "privileged energy producer" for the subsequent two-year period. The privileged producer status made the company eligible for public funds earmarked by the government for support of electricity generation from sustainable and renewable sources.

== Personal life ==
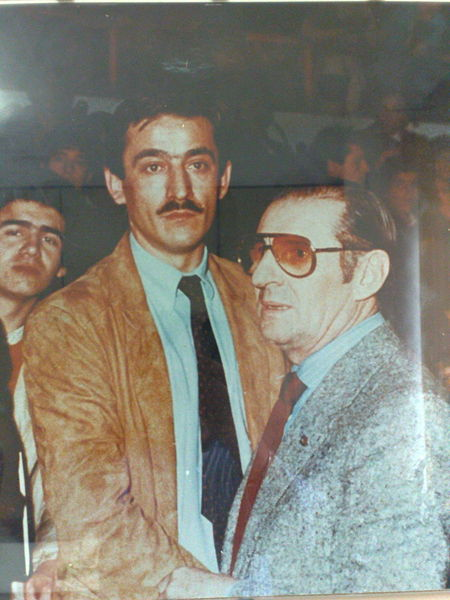
Tanjević (center) during the 1980s

In March 1969, Tanjević married Jasna Selimović, a basketball player herself who played for ŽKK Željezničar and ŽKK Voždovac during her career, even making the Yugoslavia national team. The two met and began dating in Sarajevo while both played within the KK Željezničar system, for its men's and women's teams, respectively. Their wedding ceremony took place in Belgrade where 22-year-old Tanjević at the time simultaneously pursued world literature studies at the University of Belgrade's Faculty of Philosophy and played basketball with OKK Beograd while Selimović played with ŽKK Voždovac. The couple has two daughters and a son. Though temporarily residing in different cities throughout Europe due to Tanjević's various head coaching jobs, his family's primary residence since 1986 has been in Trieste, Italy.

Tanjević's nephew (his brother's son) Bojan Tanjević (born in 1974) is a Belgrade-born-and-raised basketball agent, formerly, until 2021, associated with the San Marino-based, Luciano Capicchioni-founded Interperformances agency. Bojan Tanjević's best-known client is Nemanja Bjelica; his additional or former clients include Vladimir Štimac, Svetislav Pešić, Mile Ilić, etc.

=== Political views and endorsements ===
In 2006, Tanjević came out in support of Montenegrin independence, becoming part of the pro-independence campaign organized by Milo Đukanović's Movement for Independent Montenegro; Tanjević's face appeared on billboards urging the citizens of Montenegro to vote 'Yes' at the referendum.

In a 2013 interview for a Slovenian TV station ahead of EuroBasket 2013 being held in Slovenia, Turkish national team head coach Tanjević expressed a nostalgic sentiment towards Yugoslavia, stating: "I don't have a country anymore, because my country was Yugoslavia in every sense. Even today I think we were stronger together. My homeland has been stolen. You've got these seven countries now, but I don't have my own and neither do the two and half million of those who used to declare as Yugoslavs. And I used to be an extreme Yugoslav. Literally an extremist".

During spring 2018, Tanjević publicly voiced his support for longtime Montenegrin leader Milo Đukanović ahead of the upcoming Montenegrin presidential elections via appearing in Đukanović's campaign video: "Being a very political man ever since my youth — I'm reading all the newspapers cover to cover — and having followed the events on the territory of former Yugoslavia in the last 20 years, I think that Milo Đukanović is the best, the smartest, and the right man to be the president of the republic. To those who [negatively] bring up Mr. Đukanović's longevity on the political scene, my answer is: 'Imagine the United States of America with Barack Obama in a 16 or 24-year term instead of just 8 and image how much better the world would be. And then give a thought to why the most developed country in the world [the People's Republic of China] is currently in the process of amending its own constitution so that Xi Jinping can remain its leader'".

In late December 2019, Tanjević signed a petition calling on the European Union institutions to condemn the public demonstrations taking place throughout Montenegro against the religious law passed by the Đukanović authorities. Referring to the protests as "a Serbian attempt of returning Montenegro within the same state with Serbia" and "Greater Serbian nationalist attack that's supposed to set the stage for a new attempt of overthrowing the Montenegrin leadership after it had successfully defended itself from the joint Serbia-and-Russia-organized October 2016 coup attempt", the petition calls on the political figures in the international community to condemn "Serbian attempts at destabilizing Montenegro, a country with an unwavering direction for the civil society, Euro-Atlantic integration, protection of minorities, and good relations with its neighbours". The petition further expands to directly point the finger at Serbia's current official political leadership in Belgrade, the Serbian Orthodox Church, and the local Montenegrin oppositional parties for being the "strategists, financiers, organizers, and logistical support providers for the destabilization of Montenegro, which has once again become the victim of the regenerated policies of Slobodan Milošević". Finally, the petition places the above-mentioned institutions in the same context and continuity with the "Serb genocide, ethnic cleansing, mass war crimes, and crimes against the humanity in Croatia, Bosnia and Herzegovina, and Kosovo".

In October 2022, ahead of the elections for the mayor of Podgorica, Tanjević expressed public support for the Democratic Party of Socialists (DPS) candidate, incumbent Ivan Vuković.

In late March 2023, ahead of the second round of the 2023 Montenegrin presidential election, Tanjević once again expressed public support for Milo Đukanović via appearing in his campaign video.

== See also ==
- List of FIBA EuroBasket winning head coaches
- List of EuroLeague-winning head coaches
