= 1979–80 Yugoslav First Basketball League =

- League: Yugoslav First Basketball League
- Sport: Basketball

1979-80
- Season champions: (Socialist Republic of Bosnia and Herzegovina) Bosna

Yugoslav First Basketball League seasons
- ← 1978–79 1980–81 →

The 1979–80 Yugoslav First Basketball League season was the 36th season of the Yugoslav First Basketball League, the highest professional basketball league in SFR Yugoslavia.

== Notable events ==
=== Dražen Petrović's league debut ===
The season saw the pro debut of fifteen-year-old Dražen Petrović. He appeared in 8 games for Šibenka throughout the season, scoring a total of 13 points. His scoring debut occurred on 29 December 1979 at home against OKK Beograd (Beko), a contest fifteen-year-and-two-month-old Petrović entered by coming on for Šibenka's veteran point guard Zoran Slavnić, who in addition to playing also shared the team's head coaching duties with Vojislav Vezović.

== Teams ==
(Socialist Republic of Serbia) SR Serbia

- Beko Beograd
- Borac Čačak
- Crvena Zvezda
- Partizan
- Radnički Belgrade

(Socialist Republic of Croatia) SR Croatia

- Cibona
- Jugoplastika
- Šibenka
- Zadar

(Socialist Republic of Bosnia and Herzegovina) SR Bosnia and Herzegovina

- Bosna

(Socialist Republic of Macedonia) SR Macedonia

- Rabotnički

(Socialist Republic of Slovenia) SR Slovenia

- Iskra Olimpija

== Classification ==
	Regular season ranking 1979-80	G	V	P	PF	PS	Pt
1.	Bosna	22	17	5	2020	1904	34
2.	Jugoplastika	22	15	7	2001	1846	30
3.	Cibona	22	13	9	1973	1901	26
4.	Partizan	22	12	10	1984	1949	24
5.	Crvena Zvezda	22	11	11	1929	1933	22
6.	Zadar	22	10	12	2041	2048	20
7.	Iskra Olimpija	22	10	12	1955	2028	20
8.	Šibenka	22	9	13	1980	1949	18
9.	Rabotnički	22	9	13	1919	2061	18
10.	Radnički Belgrade	22	9	13	1881	1913	18
11.	Beko Beograd	22	8	14	1892	1930	16
12.	Borac Čačak	22	8	14	1992	2035	16

The winning roster of Bosna:

- (Socialist Federal Republic of Yugoslavia) Borislav Vučević
- (Socialist Federal Republic of Yugoslavia) Emir Mutapčić
- (Socialist Federal Republic of Yugoslavia) Predrag Benaček
- (Socialist Federal Republic of Yugoslavia) Boško Bosiočić
- (Socialist Federal Republic of Yugoslavia) Nihad Izić
- (Socialist Federal Republic of Yugoslavia) Ratko Radovanović
- (Socialist Federal Republic of Yugoslavia) Dragan Zrno
- (Socialist Federal Republic of Yugoslavia) Žarko Varajić
- (Socialist Federal Republic of Yugoslavia) Mirza Delibašić
- (Socialist Federal Republic of Yugoslavia) Sabahudin Bilalović
- (Socialist Federal Republic of Yugoslavia) Sabit Hadžić
- (Socialist Federal Republic of Yugoslavia) Miroljub Mitrović

Coach: (Socialist Federal Republic of Yugoslavia) Bogdan Tanjević

== Results ==
Home \ Away	BOS	JUG	CIB	PAR	CZV	ZAD	OLI	ŠIB	RAB	RAD	OKK	BOR
Bosna	—	72–79	99–85	106–100	98–88	120–101	103–95	83–82	97–85	72–73	88–85	118–103
Jugoplastika	73–75	—	84–86	89–79	90–77	91–97	92–73	124–93	114–89	101–77	99–85	81–75
Cibona	91–86	101–91	—	104–85	75–71	88–91	105–90	81–77	124–81	91–85	74–76	97–93
Partizan	73–72	72–80	81–82	—	92–90	107–98	107–95	101–99	92–82	91–80	88–89	101–88
Crvena Zvezda	90–93	88–92	102–80	89–80	—	90–88	90–85	106–89	89–88	95–85	97–77	99–87
Zadar	96–98	82–84	92–90	84–78	88–86	—	87–75	106–104	97–80	82–89	93–89	109–97
Olimpija	82–83	89–88	73–72	86–104	84–72	104–94	—	96–95	107–99	83–79	89–87	105–102
Šibenka	92–104	81–70	91–92	83–73	104–68	99–98	87–81	—	93–75	81–72	95–80	94–76
Rabotnički	83–92	90–89	75–73	99–102	100–90	106–97	101–94	89–85	—	88–75	75–72	93–89
Radnički Belgrade	92–90	92–107	100–99	89–104	101–85	87–81	85–86	81–79	80–79	—	89–85	89–97
Beko Beograd	80–86	85–93	81–87	81–94	77–84	88–89	107–96	96–88	100–73	104–90	—	86–85
Borac Čačak	76–87	88–90	97–96	84–80	80–83	98–91	89–87	97–89	110–87	103–91	78–82	—

Source: Pearlbasket
Legend: Blue = home team win; Red = away team win.
Matches with lighter background shading were decided after overtime.

== Scoring leaders ==
1. Branko Skroče (Zadar) - ___ points (31.8ppg)
2. Dražen Dalipagić (Partizan) - ___ points (31.4ppg)

== Qualification in 1980-81 season European competitions ==
FIBA European Champions Cup

- Bosna (champions)

FIBA Cup Winner's Cup

- Cibona (Cup winners)

FIBA Korać Cup

- Jugoplastika (2nd)
- Partizan (4th)
- Crvena Zvezda (5th)
- Zadar (6th)

== Basketball Cup ==
=== Bracket ===
Eightfinals
Kvarner	98
Jugoplastika	88
Zadar	81
Beko Beograd	80
Cibona	123
Libela Celje	99
Radnički LMK Belgrade	94
Elektrokosovo	84
Bosna	98
Rabotnički	86
Partizan	100
Budućnost	87
Borac Čačak	112
Slovan	105
Vojvodina	90
Drina	80

Quarterfinals
Kvarner	102
Zadar	95
Cibona	81
Radnički LMK Belgrade	79
Bosna	93
Partizan	87
Borac Čačak	89
Vojvodina	85

Semifinals
Kvarner	79
Cibona	85
Bosna
Borac Čačak

Finals
Cibona	68
Bosna	62
