= Predrag Šarić =

Croatian basketball player (born 1959)

Personal information
- Born: November 20, 1959 (age 66) Šibenik, PR Croatia, FPR Yugoslavia
- Listed height: 2.00 m (6 ft 7 in)

Career information
- NBA draft: 1981: undrafted
- Playing career: 1974–1997
- Position: Small forward
- Number: 13

Career history
- 1974–1988: Šibenka
- 1988–1990: Zadar
- 1990–1992: Šibenka
- 1992–1994: Zadar
- 1994–1997: Triglav Osiguranje Rijeka

Career highlights
- 2× FIBA Korać Cup runner-up (1982, 1983)

Predrag Šarić "Šiši" (born November 20, 1959) is a Croatian former professional basketball player. In his career, he played for Šibenka, Zadar, and Triglav Osiguranje Rijeka. He also played for the Yugoslavia national team six times.

== Playing career ==
Šarić, in his pro career, played for Šibenka in the 1980s with Dražen Petrović, becoming Yugoslav First League runner-up in 1983. He also played two times in the Korać Cup final games against Limoges, which beat them both times. Later, Šarić played for Zadar and Triglav Osiguranje Rijeka, where he had played with famous Yugoslav players, Danko Cvjetičanin from Croatia, and Mario Primorac from Bosnia and Herzegovina.

== Personal life ==
Šarić was born in Šibenik. Predrag married former professional basketball player Veselinka Crvak, who played with the Yugoslav champions, Elemes Šibenik. Their children, a son Dario and daughter Dana, are professional basketball players. Dario plays for the Golden State Warriors of the National Basketball Association (NBA), and Dana plays for Croatian ŽKK Šibenik.
