= Hrvoje Vlašić =

Croatian basketball coach (born 1969)

HKK Posušje
- Position: Head coach
- League: Bosnian League

Personal information
- Born: July 16, 1969 (age 57) Zadar, SR Croatia, SFR Yugoslavia

Career history

Coaching
- Zadar (women's team)
- Dubrava
- 2001–2002: Zadar
- Kvarner
- 2004–2005: Šibenka Dalmare
- 2005–2008: HKK Posušje
- 2009–2010: Široki Eronet
- 2010–2011: Čapljina Lasta
- 2011–2013: Jolly Šibenik
- 2013–2014: Zadar
- 2015–2016: Sonik Puntamika
- 2016–2019: Zrinjski Mostar
- 2019–2020: Široki
- 2020–2022: Sonik Puntamika
- 2022–present: HKK Posušje

Hrvoje Vlašić (born July 16, 1969) is a Croatian professional basketball coach for HKK Posušje, who play in the Basketball Championship of Bosnia and Herzegovina.

== Coaching career ==
In the beginning of his coaching career Vlašić worked with teams from Croatia such as Dubrava and Kvarner, and from Bosnia and Herzegovina such as Posušje, Široki Eronet and Čapljina Lasta. During 2004–05 season, he coached Šibenka Dalmare in their only Adriatic League season in the history.

On November 28, 2011, Vlašić became the head coach of the Šibenik-based team Jolly Jadranska Banka. On February 4, 2013, he was fired by the Jolly Šibenik. On August 23, 2013, he was hired to be the head coach of the Zadar. It was his second term as Zadar head coach. Also, he briefly coached Zadar's team during 2001–02 season.

On August 4, 2016, he was hired to be the head coach of the Mostar-based team Zrinjski. On July 10, 2018, he signed a new two-year deal for Zrinjski.

On July 18, 2022, he became the head coach of Bosnian Basketball Championship team HKK Posušje.

== Career achievements ==
- Bosnian League champion: 2 (with Široki TT Kabeli: 2008–09; with Zrinjski: 2017–18)
