= Mladen Erjavec =

Personal information
- Born: April 8, 1970 (age 56) Zagreb, SR Croatia, SFR Yugoslavia
- Listed height: 6 ft 3.6 in (1.92 m)
- Position: Point guard

Career history

Playing
- 1995–1996: Idrija
- 1996: Benston Zagreb
- 1998–1999: Zadar
- 1999–2000: Polonia Przemyśl
- 2000–2001: Czarni Słupsk
- 2001–2002: FEAL Široki
- 2002–2003: Zadar
- 2003–2004: Avtodor Saratov
- 2004: Šibenka
- 2004–2005: Orléans
- 2005–2006: Split CO
- 2006: Lievin
- 2006: Zagreb
- 2006–2007: Kevranos

Coaching
- 2007–2010: Zagreb (assistant)
- 2010–2011: Zagreb
- 2011–2012: Svjetlost Brod
- 2012–2013: Split
- 2014: Jolly JBŠ
- 2008: Croatia U20 (assistant)
- 2009–2011: Croatia (assistant)
- 2013: Croatia (assistant)

Career highlights
- As player: Adriatic League champion (2003); Bosnian League champion (2002); Bosnian Cup winner (2002); Croatian Cup winner (2003); Cypriot Cup winner (2007); As coach: Croatian Cup winner (2011)

Mladen Erjavec (born 8 April 1970) is a Croatian former professional basketball player, and now a coach.

Erjavec played on the point guard position for Slovenian, Croatian, Bosnian-Herzegovinian, Polish, French, Russian and Cypriot clubs.

As an assistant coach with the Croatian national basketball team he participated in the 2009 Mediterranean Games, 2010 World Championship, 2011 European Championship and 2013 European Championship.

In July 2014 he became the coach of KK Jolly JBŠ but was replaced before the start of the season due to poor results in pre-season matches.
