= Predrag Benaček =

Bosnian basketball player and coach

Olomoucko
- Title: Head coach
- League: Czech National League

Personal information
- Born: 29 March 1959 (age 67) Sarajevo, PR Bosnia and Herzegovina, Yugoslavia
- Listed height: 2.06 m (6 ft 9 in)
- Listed weight: 96 kg (212 lb)

Career information
- NBA draft: 1981: undrafted
- Playing career: 1975–1996
- Position: Power forward
- Number: 6, 8
- Coaching career: 1996–present

Career history

Playing
- 1975–1988: Bosna
- 1988–1992: Panionios
- 1992–1993: Maribor
- 1993–1996: Pardubice

Coaching
- 1998–1999: Pardubice (assistant)
- 1999–2001: Helios Domžale (assistant)
- 2001–2002: Hopsi Polzela
- 2002–2003: ČEZ Nymburk (assistant)
- 2003–2004: Prostějov
- 2004–2007: Apollon Limassol
- 2008–2017: Kolín
- 2017–present: Olomoucko
Medals
Men's basketball
Representing Yugoslavia
EuroBasket
| Silver medal – second place | 1981 Czechoslovakia | Team |
European Championship for Juniors
| Bronze medal – third place | 1978 Italy | Team |

Predrag Benaček (born 29 March 1959) is a Bosnian professional basketball coach and former player who is the current head coach for Olomoucko of the Czech National League.

== Playing career ==
A power forward, Benaček played 20 seasons in Yugoslavia, Greece, Slovenia, and the Czech Republic between 1975 and 1996. During his playing days, he played for Bosna, Panionios, Maribor, and Pardubice. He retired as a player with Pardubice in 1996.

== National team career ==
Benaček was a member of the Yugoslavia Juniors team that won the bronze medal at the 1978 European Championship for Juniors held in Italy. Over six tournament games, he averaged 14.9 points per game.

Benaček was a member of the Yugoslavia national team, alongside Krešimir Ćosić, Dragan Kićanović, Dražen Dalipagić and Mirza Delibašić, that won the silver medal at the EuroBasket 1981 held in Czechoslovakia. Over six tournament games, he averaged four points per game.

== Coaching career ==
After retirement in 1996, Benaček joined the youth system of Pardubice. In 1998, he became an assistant coach of Pardubice. In 1999, he was named an assistant coach for Slovenian club Helios Domžale. In 2001, he was hired as the new head coach for Hopsi Polzela. In 2002, Benaček joined the ČEZ Nymburk staff as an assistant coach. In 2003, he became the head coach of Prostějov.

In 2004, he was named the head coach for Apollon Limassol of the Cyprus Division A.

In July 2008, Benaček came back to the Czech Republic, becoming the head coach for Kolín. In June 2017, he left Kolín after nine seasons.

In 2017, Benaček was hired as the new head coach for Olomoucko.

=== National team coaching career ===
In 2005, Benaček was named the head coach for the Cyprus national team. He left the national team in 2007.

In 2007, Benaček became the head coach for the Czech Republic under-19 team.

== Career achievements and awards ==
As player

- EuroLeague champion: 1 (with Bosna: 1978–79)
- Yugoslav League champion: 3 (with Bosna: 1977–78, 1979–80, 1982–83)
- Yugoslav Cup winner: 2 (with Bosna: 1977–78, 1983–84)
- Greek Cup winner: 1 (with Panionios: 1990–91)
- Czech Republic Cup winner: 1 (with JIP Pardubice: 1993–94)
