= KK Jolly JBS =

KK Jolly JBS may refer to:

- ŽKK Jolly JBS, women's basketball club
- KK Jolly Jadranska Banka, men's basketball club
