= Borislav Vučević =

Montenegrin basketball player

Personal information
- Born: August 7, 1958 (age 68) Bar, PR Montenegro, FPR Yugoslavia
- Listed height: 2.01 m (6 ft 7 in)

Career information
- NBA draft: 1980: undrafted
- Playing career: 1975–2002
- Position: Small forward
- Number: 4

Career history
- 1975–1978: Mladost Bar
- 1978–1987: Bosna
- 1987–1992: Adecco Olympique Lausanne
- 1992–1994: Athlon Ieper
- 1994–1996: Brussels
- 1996–2001: Okapi Aalstar
- 2001–2002: Liège

Career highlights
- EuroLeague champion (1979); 2× Yugoslav League champion (1980, 1983); Yugoslav Cup winner (1984); Belgian Basketball Cup winner (1995)
Medals
Men's basketball
Representing Yugoslavia
Mediterranean Games
Gold medal – first place	1983 Morocco	Team

Borislav "Boro" Vučević (Serbian Cyrillic: Борислав Вучевић; born August 7, 1958) is a Montenegrin former professional basketball player. He is the father of NBA All-Star Nikola Vučević.

== National team career ==
Vučević was a member of the Yugoslavia national team that competed at the EuroBasket 1985 in West Germany. Over eight tournament games, he averaged 9.4 points per game.

Also, Vučević won the gold medal at the 1983 Mediterranean Games in Morocco.

== Career achievements and awards ==
- EuroLeague champion: 1 (with Bosna: 1978–79)
- Yugoslav League champion: 2 (with Bosna: 1979–80, 1982–83)
- Yugoslav Cup winner: 1 (with Bosna: 1983–84)

== Personal life ==
Vučević's wife, Ljiljana (Née Kubura), was a 6-foot-2 basketball forward for a Sarajevo-based club Željezničar, as well as for the Yugoslavia Cadet national team at the 1976 FIBA Europe Championship for Cadets. They have a son Nikola (born 1990), who is a professional basketball player.
