= Ottone Olivieri =

Italian-Yugoslav basketball player

Personal information
- Born: 1917 Fiume, City of Fiume and its District, Austria-Hungary
- Number: 5, 14

Career history
- 1940–1942: CRDA Monfalcone
- 1946: Kvarner

Ottone Olivieri, also credited as Otone Olivijeri, was an Italian-Yugoslav basketball player. He represented the Yugoslavia national basketball team internationally.

== Playing career ==
Olivieri played for the CRDA Monfalcone of the Italian Lega Basket Serie A in the beginning of 1940s. After the end of Second World War, he was one of the founders of the club Kvarner in Rijeka. Later he moved to Split where he took a part in development of KK Split.

== National team career ==
Olivieri was a member of the Yugoslavia national team which participated at the 1947 FIBA European Championship. Over five tournament games, he averaged 5.2 points per game.

== Personal life ==
His older brother Albano was a basketball player.
