= 1982–83 First Federal Basketball League =

1982–83 Yugoslav First Basketball League
- League: Yugoslav First Basketball League
- Sport: Basketball

Regular season
- Season champions: (Socialist Republic of Croatia) Šibenka

Play-offs
- Finals champions: (Socialist Republic of Bosnia and Herzegovina) Bosna
- Runners-up: (Socialist Republic of Croatia) Šibenka

Yugoslav First Basketball League seasons
- ← 1981–82 1983–84 →

The 1982–83 Yugoslav First Basketball League season was the 39th season of the Yugoslav First Basketball League, the highest professional basketball league in SFR Yugoslavia.

== Teams ==
(Socialist Republic of Croatia) SR Croatia

- Cibona
- Jugoplastika
- Kvarner
- Šibenka
- Zadar

(Socialist Republic of Serbia) SR Serbia

- Borac Čačak
- Crvena Zvezda
- Partizan
- Radnički Belgrade

(Socialist Republic of Bosnia and Herzegovina) SR Bosnia and Herzegovina

- Bosna

(Socialist Republic of Montenegro) SR Montenegro

- Budućnost

(Socialist Republic of Slovenia) SR Slovenia

- ZZI Olimpija

== Regular season ==
=== Classification ===
Pos	Teams	Pld	W	L	PF	PA	Pts	Qualification or relegation
1.	Šibenka	22	16	6	2061	2023	32	Advance to Playoffs quarterfinal
2.	Partizan	22	15	7	2111	2046	30	Advance to Playoffs quarterfinal
3.	Bosna	22	15	7	2137	2048	30	Advance to Playoffs quarterfinal
4.	Crvena Zvezda	22	14	8	2146	1999	28	Advance to Playoffs quarterfinal
5.	Cibona	22	14	8	2103	1986	28	Advance to Playoffs quarterfinal
6.	Zadar	22	13	9	2084	2021	26	Advance to Playoffs quarterfinal
7.	ZZI Olimpija	22	11	11	2031	2068	20	Advance to single-game Play-in
8.	Jugoplastika	22	10	12	2093	2046	20	Advance to single-game Play-in
9.	Borac Čačak	22	8	14	2059	2109	16	
10.	Budućnost	22	8	14	1818	1970	16	
11.	Radnički Belgrade	22	5	17	2025	2166	10	Relegated
12.	Kvarner	22	3	19	2085	2271	6	Relegated

== Results ==
Home \ Away	ŠIB	PAR	BOS	CZV	CIB	ZAD	OLI	JUG	BOR	BUD	RAD	KVA
Šibenka	—	87–84	97–92	95–94	78–72	98–95	94–91	91–96	110–102	81–76	113–92	127–113
Partizan	99–100	—	91–89	86–92	93–90	99–93	104–100	98–83	106–89	92–74	112–95	106–101
Bosna	87–74	85–86	—	94–89	99–105	103–100	88–89	102–94	118–110	90–84	118–101	133–114
Crvena Zvezda	111–93	95–94	88–90	—	97–89	109–102	109–88	100–97	107–84	117–87	113–108	115–87
Cibona	95–89	110–96	99–95	91–88	—	107–83	113–99	99–100	99–92	93–70	107–91	110–94
Zadar	92–93	84–86	93–104	91–81	74–73	—	108–97	94–90	108–100	101–77	104–84	102–96
Olimpija	89–90	85–87	92–96	93–90	85–77	83–92	—	100–97	109–107	92–79	104–92	90–85
Jugoplastika	94–96	114–82	93–72	93–91	107–121	92–98	103–91	—	94–89	93–83	110–92	86–69
Borac Čačak	91–95	107–115	95–110	78–74	90–77	86–95	99–102	80–79	—	86–79	104–84	99–97
Budućnost	87–82	77–72	82–87	83–84	85–89	82–80	98–74	88–82	81–79	—	88–81	96–87
Radnički Belgrade	85–80	96–104	87–97	85–96	99–98	83–95	78–82	100–94	85–95	108–63	—	96–99
Kvarner	97–101	100–119	85–88	91–106	82–89	98–100	82–96	110–102	88–108	120–99	90–103	—

Source: Pearlbasket
Legend: Blue = home team win; Red = away team win.
Matches with lighter background shading were decided after overtime.

== Play-off ==
Single game play-in qualifying
8	Jugoplastika	98
B1	IMT	97
7	Olimpija	93
B2	Rabotnički	82

Quarterfinals
1	Šibenka	104	85	91
8	Jugoplastika	102	98	75
4	Crvena zvezda	103	92
5	Cibona	73	84
2	Partizan	94	76	111
7	Olimpija	81	77	108
3	Bosna	98	89	121
6	Zadar	103	87	109

Semifinals
1	Šibenka	91	89	98
4	Crvena zvezda	88	105	89
2	Partizan	85	81
3	Bosna	95	87

Finals
1	Šibenka	103	84	83*
3	Bosna	98	96	82*

(*) game 3 of the final series was subsequently annulled by the KSJ

=== Play-In Qualifying Round ===
Jugoplastika-IMT 98-97

Olimpija-Rabotnički 93-82

=== Quarter-finals ===
Šibenka-Jugoplastika 104-102, 85-98, 91-75

Crvena Zvezda-Cibona 103-73, 92-84

Partizan-Olimpija 94-81, 76-77, 111-108

Bosna-Zadar 98-103, 89-87, 121-109

=== Semi-finals ===
Šibenka-Crvena Zvezda 91-88, 89-105, 98-89

Partizan-Bosna 85-95, 81-87

=== Finals ===
Šibenka-Bosna 103-98, 84-96, 83-82

On 9 April 1983, Šibenka and Bosna played the deciding Game 3 of their playoff final series that was decided in the last second. With Bosna up by a point and the clock winding down Šibenka had the last possession, Bosna's Sabit Hadžić was controversially adjudged by the referee Ilija Matijević to have fouled Šibenka's Dražen Petrović as he went up for a shot at the buzzer. Since being in the act of shooting, Petrović got two free throws and proceeded to score both, winning the game and championship for his team. Next morning, the Basketball Federation of Yugoslavia (KSJ) presidency reviewed the game on account the time expired prior to the foul being called and on account of refereeing irregularities. They decided to void the result, ordering a single-game title playoff at a neutral venue in Novi Sad. Šibenka decided to boycott the decision. Since Šibenka refused to show up for the Novi Sad game, the title was awarded to Bosna.

== Winning team ==
=== Roster ===
The winning roster of Bosna:

- (Socialist Federal Republic of Yugoslavia) Borislav Vučević
- (Socialist Federal Republic of Yugoslavia) Bogoljub Đurić
- (Socialist Federal Republic of Yugoslavia) Predrag Benaček
- (Socialist Federal Republic of Yugoslavia) Spomenko Pajević
- (Socialist Federal Republic of Yugoslavia) Mario Primorac
- (Socialist Federal Republic of Yugoslavia) Ratko Radovanović
- (Socialist Federal Republic of Yugoslavia) Dragan Zrno
- (Socialist Federal Republic of Yugoslavia) Žarko Varajić
- (Socialist Federal Republic of Yugoslavia) Emir Mutapčić
- (Socialist Federal Republic of Yugoslavia) Sabit Hadžić
- (Socialist Federal Republic of Yugoslavia) Miroljub Mitrović

=== Coaching staff ===
The coaching staff:

- (Socialist Federal Republic of Yugoslavia) Svetislav Pešić, Head coach

== Scoring leaders ==
Scoring leaders:

1. Duško Ivanović (Budućnost) - 603 points (27.4 ppg)
2. Dražen Petrović (Šibenka) - 561 points (25.5 ppg)
3. Peter Vilfan (Olimpija) - 535 points (25.4 ppg)

== Qualification in 1983-84 season European competitions ==
FIBA European Champions Cup

- Bosna (champions)

FIBA Cup Winner's Cup

- Cibona (Cup winners)

FIBA Korać Cup

- Šibenka (1st)
- Partizan (2nd)
- Crvena Zvezda (4th)
- Zadar (6th)

== Basketball Cup ==
=== Bracket ===
Eightfinals
Libela Celje	85
Jugoplastika	83
Šibenka	91
Crvena zvezda	103
Rabotnički	86
Smelt Olimpija	82
Sloboda Tuzla	91
Vojvodina	85
IMT	106
Budućnost	87
Zadar	97
Bosna	86
Cibona	116
Radnički Belgrade	89
Borac Čačak	91
Trepča	85

Quarterfinals
Libela Celje	104
Crvena zvezda	122
Rabotnički	88
Sloboda Tuzla	82
IMT	95
Zadar	89
Cibona	108
Borac Čačak	104

Semifinals
Crvena zvezda	85
Rabotnički	89
IMT	96
Cibona	117

Finals
Rabotnički	79
Cibona	92
