= Veselinka Šarić =

Croatian basketball player (born 1971)

Personal information
- Born: 1971 (age 54–55) Šibenik, SR Croatia, SFR Yugoslavia

Career history
- 1987–1994: Elemes Šibenik
- 2004–: ŽKK Vidici Dalmostan

Career highlights
- Yugoslav League champion (1991); Yugoslav Cup runner-up (1988, 1989, 1990)

Veselinka "Vesa" Šarić (née Crvak; born in 1971) is a Croatian former professional basketball player.

== Playing career ==
Šarić started playing basketball at age 11 in her hometown of Šibenik. As a senior, she played for the local club Elemes from the end of the 1980s until 1994, when she was pregnant with her son Dario.

Later, she played several years for the club before finishing her professional playing career. In 2004 she was appointed head coach of the local women's club, ŽKK Vidici Dalmostan, which under her leadership entered the Croatian Women's Basketball League.

== Personal life ==
Veselinka Crvak was born in Šibenik.

She is married to the former basketball player Predrag Šarić. Šarić is the mother of Dario and Dana Šarić, both basketball players.

== Achievements ==
- Yugoslav Women's Basketball League
  - Champion (1): 1991
  - Vicechampion (3): 1988, 1989, 1990
