= Emir Mutapčić =

Bosnian professional basketball coach

Emir "Muki" Mutapčić
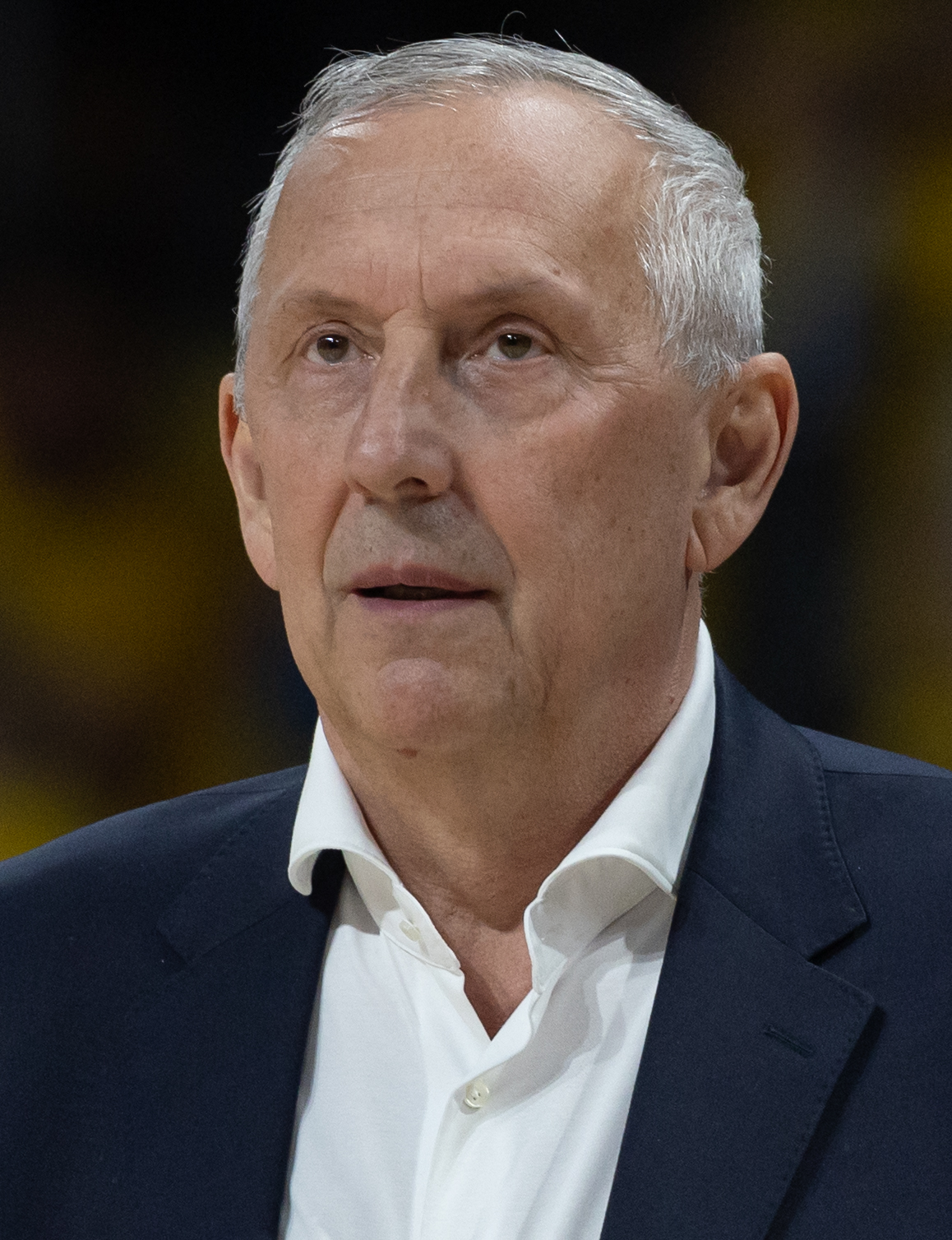
- Mutapčić with Munich in 2026

Personal information
- Born: 27 May 1960 (age 66) Zenica, PR Bosnia and Herzegovina, FPR Yugoslavia
- Listed height: 6 ft 6 in (1.98 m)

Career information
- Playing career: 1979–1993
- Position: Forward
- Coaching career: 1993–present

Career history

Playing
- 1979–1989: Bosna
- 1989–1991: Hapoel Jerusalem
- 1991–1993: Alba Berlin

Coaching
- 1997: Bosnia and Herzegovina
- 1998–2000: TuS Lichterfelde
- 2000–2005: Alba Berlin
- 2004: Bosnia and Herzegovina
- 2005–2008: Germany U20
- 2006–2009: Phantoms Braunschweig
- 2010–2012: Anwil Włocławek
- 2013–2020: Bayern Munich (assistant)
- 2014: Germany
- 2018: Bayern Munich (interim)
- 2021–2022: ZTE KK

Career highlights
- As player: 2× Yugoslavian League champion (1980, 1983); Yugoslavian Cup winner (1984); Israeli League Assists Leader (1990); As head coach: 3× German League champion (2001–2003); 2× German Cup winner (2002, 2003); German League Coach of the Year (2002)
Medals
Men's basketball
Representing Yugoslavia
Olympic Games
Bronze medal – third place	1984 Los Angeles	Team competition
World Cup
Bronze medal – third place	1986 Spain	Team competition

Emir "Meho" Mutapčić (born 27 May 1960) is a Bosnian professional basketball coach and former player. He most recently worked as the head coach for Zalaegerszeg of the Hungarian league. Mutapčić competed for Yugoslavia in the 1984 Summer Olympics. He was the Israeli Premier League Assists Leader in 1990.
