= Faruk Kulenović =

Croatian-Bosnian basketball coach (1952–2026)

Personal information
- Born: 23 February 1952 Zagreb, PR Croatia, FPR Yugoslavia
- Died: 24 January 2026 (aged 73)

Career information
- Playing career: 1963–1973

Career history

Playing
- 1963–1973: HAKK Mladost

Coaching
- 1981–82: Šibenka

Faruk Kulenović (23 February 1952 – 24 January 2026) was a Croatian-Bosnian professional basketball coach. When he coached KK Šibenik, Dražen Petrović was a youngster at the club. Kulenović died on 24 January 2026, at the age of 73.

== Career ==
- as a player
  - 1963–1973 HAKK Mladost
- as a coach
  - 1973–1978 Medveščak
  - 1979–1981 Borovo
  - 1981–1982 Šibenik
  - 1982–1985 Kvarner
  - 1985–1987 Pula
  - 1988 Hapoel Jerusalem
  - 1989 KK Šibenik
  - 1990–1993 Alba Berlin
  - 1993–1994 Fenerbahçe
  - 1994–1995 National team of Bosnia and Herzegovina
  - 1995–1996 Zrinjevac
  - 1996–1999 Slavonski Brod
  - 1999–2000 Zrinjevac
  - 2000–2001 Ohud Medina
  - 2005–2006 Darüşşafaka Doğuş Youth Team
  - 2008–2009 İstanbul Teknik Üniversitesi Youth Team
