= Vojislav Vezović =

Serbian basketball coach and player

Personal information
- Born: 19 November 1948 (age 77) Belgrade, FNR Yugoslavia

Career information
- NBA draft: 1972: undrafted
- Playing career: 1968–1974
- Coaching career: 1969–2008

Career history

Coaching
- 1969–1974: Crvena Zvezda Youth
- 1974–1976: Radnički Kragujevac
- 1977–1978: Nigeria Women
- 1979–1981: Šibenka
- 1981–1982: Sloboda Tuzla
- 1982–1983: Borovo
- 1983–1984: OKK Beograd
- 1984–1987: Apollon Patras
- 1987–1988: Iraklio
- 1989–1990: Maroussi
- 1990–1991: Ilysiakos
- 1992: OKK Beograd
- 1993–1994: ENAD Nicosia
- 1994–1995: Olimpiada Nicosia
- 1996–1998: Zastava
- 1998–1999: Al Rayyan
- 2000–2001: Beopetrol
- 2001–2002: MKS Pruszków
- 2003–2008: Atlas

Career highlights
- Qatari League champion (1999); Emir of Qatar Cup winner (1999)
Medals
Women's basketball
Head Coach for Nigeria
African Games
Bronze medal – third place	1978 Algiers	Team

Vojislav Vezović (Serbian Cyrillic: Војислав Везовић; born 19 November 1948) is a Serbian former professional basketball coach and player.

== Early life and playing career ==
Vezović was born in Belgrade, PR Serbia, Yugoslavia. In Belgrade, he graduated from Ivan Goran Kovačić Elementary School and Sixth Belgrade Gymnasium. In 1962, he started to play basketball and grew up with Crvena Zvezda youth teams. Vezović played senior basketball in Crvena zvezda's affiliations: KK Kalemegdan and KK Voždovac. He ended his playing career in 1974.

== Coaching career ==
Vezović was a head coach for the Nigeria women's national team that won the bronze medal at the 1978 All-Africa Games in Algeria. He also coached teams in Greece (Apollon Patras, Iraklio, Maroussi, and Ilysiakos), Cyprus (ENAD Nicosia and Olimpiada Nicosia), Qatar (Al Rayyan), and Poland (MKS Pruszków).
