= Ivica Žurić =

Croatian basketball player (born 1965)

Personal information
- Born: 9 January 1965 (age 61) Šibenik, SR Croatia, SFR Yugoslavia
- Listed height: 6 ft 9 in (2.06 m)
- Listed weight: 235 lb (107 kg)
- Position: Power forward

Career history
- 1982–1991: Šibenka
- 1991–1992: Zagreb
- 1992–1997: Cibona
- 1997–1998: Olimpija Osijek
- 1998–1999: Kombassan Konya
- 1999–2001: Cibona

Career highlights
- 7× Croatian League champion (1993–1997, 2000, 2001); 3× Croatian Cup winner (1995, 1996, 2001); Croatian Cup MVP (1996)
Medals
Representing Croatia
World Cup
Bronze medal – third place	1994 Canada	Croatia
EuroBasket
Bronze medal – third place	1995 Greece	Croatia
Bronze medal – third place	1993 Germany	Croatia
Representing Yugoslavia
European Championship for Juniors
Silver medal – second place	1982 Bulgaria	Yugoslavia U-18
Bronze medal – third place	1984 Sweden	Yugoslavia U-18

Ivica Žurić (born 9 January 1965 in Šibenik, Croatia) is a former Croatian professional basketball player. He was a versatile 2.06 m (6 ft 9 in) tall power forward.

== Professional career ==
Žurić competed in the EuroLeague for many years, wearing the jersey of Cibona Zagreb.

== Croatian national team ==
Žurić was a member of the senior men's Croatian national team. With Croatia, he won the bronze medal at the 1994 FIBA World Championship, the bronze medal at the 1993 EuroBasket, and the bronze medal at the 1995 EuroBasket.
