= 2004–05 ABA Goodyear League =

2004–05 ABA Goodyear League season
- League: ABA Goodyear League
- Sport: Basketball
- Duration: 6 October 2004 — 9 April 2005 (regular season); 28 April — 1 May 2005 (Final 8)
- Teams: Croatia (5 teams); Serbia and Montenegro (5 teams); Slovenia (4 teams); Bosnia and Herzegovina (2 teams)

Regular season
- Season champions: (Serbia and Montenegro) Hemofarm
- Season MVP: (Serbia and Montenegro) Dejan Milojević (Partizan)
- Top scorer: (Serbia and Montenegro) Dejan Milojević (Partizan) (21.77 ppg)

Final 8
- Champions: (Serbia and Montenegro) Hemofarm

ABA Goodyear League seasons
- ← 2003–04 2005–06 →

Adriatic League expanded from 14 to 16 teams before the 2004–05 season. It was the second time since the inaugural 2001-02 that the competition expanded its number of teams.

16 teams from Slovenia, Croatia, Bosnia and Herzegovina, Serbia and Montenegro participated in Goodyear League in its fourth season: Union Olimpija, Helios, Pivovarna Laško, Geoplin Slovan, Cibona VIP, Zadar, Zagreb, Split Croatia Osiguranje, Šibenka Dalmare, Široki Hercegtisak, Bosna ASA BH TELECOM, Crvena zvezda, Partizan Pivara MB, Hemofarm, Reflex, Budućnost.

In this season the league also decided to change the play-off system. The Final Tournament was expanded and renamed into the Final Eight Tournament. There were 30 rounds played in the regular part of the season, best eight teams qualified for the Final Eight Tournament which was played in Belgrade from April 28 until May 1, 2005.

Hemofarm became the 2005 Goodyear League Champion.

Throughout the season, the issue of Partizan's forward Milan Gurović not being allowed to enter Croatia due to having a tattoo of Draža Mihailović on his left shoulder received much attention in the media.

== Regular season ==
Pos	Team	Pld	W	L	PF	PA	PD	Pts	Qualification or relegation
1	Hemofarm	30	22	8	2591	2426	+165	52	Qualified for Final eight
2	Partizan Pivara MB	30	20	10	2539	2386	+153	50	Qualified for Final eight
3	Crvena zvezda	30	20	10	2489	2260	+229	50	Qualified for Final eight
4	Union Olimpija	30	20	10	2480	2348	+132	50	Qualified for Final eight
5	Reflex	30	20	10	2422	2302	+120	50	Qualified for Final eight
6	Cibona VIP	30	19	11	2560	2334	+226	49	Qualified for Final eight
7	Zadar	30	19	11	2491	2320	+171	49	Qualified for Final eight
8	Bosna ASA BHT	30	18	12	2425	2395	+30	48	Qualified for Final eight
9	Pivovarna Laško	30	16	14	2224	2108	+116	46	
10	Geoplin Slovan	30	15	15	2352	2356	−4	45	
11	Šibenka Dalmare	30	11	19	2310	2516	−206	41	Relegated
12	Zagreb	30	11	19	2404	2547	−143	41	
13	Široki Hercegtisak	30	9	21	2208	2459	−251	39	
14	Budućnost	30	9	21	2323	2540	−217	39	Relegated
15	Split CO	30	6	24	2284	2476	−192	36	Relegated
16	Helios	30	5	25	2171	2500	−329	35	

== Stats Leaders ==
=== Points ===
Rank	Name	Team	Points	Games	PPG
1.	(Serbia) Dejan Milojević	Partizan	566	26	21,77
2.	(Croatia) Marko Tomas	Zagreb	588	30	19,60
3.	(Croatia) Roko Ukić	Split	481	26	18,50
4.	(Croatia) Damir Miljković	Zagreb	506	29	17,45
5.	(Croatia) Marko Banić	Zadar	535	31	17,26

=== Rebounds ===
Rank	Name	Team	Rebounds	Games	RPG
1.	(Serbia) Dejan Milojević	Partizan	219	26	8,42
2.	(Croatia) Frano Čolak	Šibenka	175	25	7,00
3.	(North Macedonia) Todor Gečevski	Zadar	198	29	6,83
4.	(Serbia) Milenko Topić	Hemofarm	196	29	6,76
5.	(Croatia) Marko Banić	Zadar	200	31	6,45

=== Assists ===
Rank	Name	Team	Assists	Games	APG
1.	(Croatia) Roko Ukić	Split	113	26	4,35
2.	(United States) Kyle Hill	Zadar	99	25	3,96
3.	(Puerto Rico) Andrés Rodríguez	Olimpija	114	30	3,80
4.	(Slovenia) Marko Antonijevič	Laško	111	30	3,70
5.	(Croatia) Marko Popović	Zadar	86	25	3,44

=== Ranking MVP ===
Rank	Name	Team	Efficiency	Games	Average
1.	(Serbia) Dejan Milojević	Partizan	789	26	30,35
2.	(Croatia) Marko Tomas	Zagreb	634	30	21,13
3.	(Croatia) Roko Ukić	Split	516	26	19,85
4.	(Croatia) Marko Banić	Zadar	607	31	19,58
5.	(Croatia) Frano Čolak	Šibenka	485	25	19,40

== Final eight ==
Matches played at Pionir Hall, Belgrade

Quarterfinals; April 29.
1	Hemofarm	84
8	Bosna ASA BHT	69
4	Union Olimpija	80
5	Reflex	91
2	Partizan Pivara MB	99
7	Zadar	72
3	Crvena zvezda	73
6	Cibona VIP	71

Semifinals; April 30.
1	Hemofarm	88
5	Reflex	80
2	Partizan Pivara MB	87
3	Crvena zvezda	85

Final; May 1.
1	Hemofarm	89
2	Partizan Pivara MB	76

2004–05 ABA Godyear League Champions
Hemofarm
1st title
