= 1982–83 FIBA Korać Cup =

- League: FIBA Korać Cup
- Sport: Basketball

Finals
- Champions: (France) Limoges CSP
- Runners-up: (Socialist Federal Republic of Yugoslavia) Šibenka

FIBA Korać Cup seasons
- ← 1981–82 1983–84 →

The 1982–83 FIBA Korać Cup was the 12th edition of FIBA's Korać Cup basketball competition. The French Limoges CSP defeated the Yugoslav Šibenka in the final on March 8, 1983 in West Berlin, Germany. The final was a rematch of the previous year's, with Limoges CSP achieving its second consecutive victory.

== First round ==
Team 1	Agg.	Team 2	1st leg	2nd leg
Sparta Bertrange (Luxembourg)	139–184	(Switzerland) Pully	69–82	70–102
Keravnos (Cyprus)	122–227	(Socialist Federal Republic of Yugoslavia) Zadar	61–115	61–112
Hapoel Galil-Elyon (Israel)	179–180	(Greece) Aris	113–87	66–93
CEP Fleurus (Belgium)	142–178	(Italy) Banco di Roma	66–101	76–77
Frisa Kortrijk (Belgium)	179–196	(France) Tours	91–83	88–113
Olympiacos (Greece)	132–162	(Netherlands) Elmex Leiden	71–70	61–92
Iraklis (Greece)	162–192	(Italy) Carrera Venezia	85–90	77–102
Tofaş (Turkey)	181–224	(Socialist Federal Republic of Yugoslavia) Crvena zvezda	80–96	101–128
Nyon (Switzerland)	4–0*	(Spain) Miñón Valladolid	2–0	2–0
Orthez (France)	180–92	(Luxembourg) Amicale	98–50	82–42
AEK (Greece)	132–157	(Italy) Latte Sole Bologna	72–89	60–68
Monaco (France)	178–165	(Spain) OAR Ferrol	89–89	89–76
Galatasaray (Turkey)	175–195	(Hungary) ZTE	101–87	74–108
Bayreuth (West Germany)	156–155	(Belgium) Anderlecht	92–77	64–78
Efes Pilsen (Turkey)	149–156	(Czechoslovakia) Nová huť Ostrava	83–80	66–76
Karşıyaka (Turkey)	150–156	(Belgium) Maes Pils	64–63	86–93

*Miñón Valladolid withdrew before the first leg due to financial problems, and Nyon received a forfeit (2–0) in both games.

== Second round ==
Team 1	Agg.	Team 2	1st leg	2nd leg
Pully (Switzerland)	195–231	(Socialist Federal Republic of Yugoslavia) Zadar	98–112	97–119
Aris (Greece)	146–175	(Italy) Banco di Roma	86–89	60–86
Tours (France)	151–148	(Netherlands) Elmex Leiden	84–80	67–68
Carrera Venezia (Italy)	160–173	(Socialist Federal Republic of Yugoslavia) Crvena zvezda	91–78	69–95
Nyon (Switzerland)	151–184	(France) Orthez	77–93	74–91
Latte Sole Bologna (Italy)	135–137	(France) Monaco	73–65	62–72
ZTE (Hungary)	164–181	(Spain) CAI Zaragoza	81–72	83–109
Bayreuth (West Germany)	156–155	(Israel) Hapoel Tel Aviv	77–70	79–85
Nová huť Ostrava (Czechoslovakia)	169–167	(Switzerland) Vevey	97–85	72–82
Merkur Graz (Austria)	165–201	(Belgium) Maes Pils	81–92	84–109

Automatically qualified to round of 16

- (France) Limoges CSP (title holder)
- (Socialist Federal Republic of Yugoslavia) Šibenka
- (Spain) Joventut Fichet
- (Italy) Binova Cucine Rieti
- (Socialist Federal Republic of Yugoslavia) Partizan
- (Soviet Union) Dynamo Moscow

== Round of 16 ==
Key to colors
Top place in each group advance to semifinals

=== Group A ===
	Team	Pld	Pts	W	L	PF	PA	PD
1.	(France) Limoges CSP	6	11	5	1	503	482	+21
2.	(Italy) Banco di Roma	6	10	4	2	519	472	+47
3.	(Socialist Federal Republic of Yugoslavia) Crvena zvezda	6	9	3	3	528	509	+19
4.	(Czechoslovakia) Nová huť Ostrava	6	6	0	6	445	532	−87

=== Group B ===
	Team	Pld	Pts	W	L	PF	PA	PD
1.	(Socialist Federal Republic of Yugoslavia) Zadar	6	10	4	2	550	526	+24
2.	(Spain) CAI Zaragoza	6	10	4	2	510	503	−7
3.	(France) Tours	6	10	4	2	541	535	+6
4.	(Belgium) Maes Pils	6	6	0	6	480	517	−37

=== Group C ===
	Team	Pld	Pts	W	L	PF	PA	PD
1.	(Soviet Union) Dynamo Moscow	6	10	4	2	588	578	+10
2.	(France) Monaco	6	10	4	2	550	525	+25
3.	(Socialist Federal Republic of Yugoslavia) Partizan	6	9	3	3	576	575	+1
4.	(Spain) Joventut Fichet	6	7	1	5	550	586	−36

=== Group D ===
	Team	Pld	Pts	W	L	PF	PA	PD
1.	(Socialist Federal Republic of Yugoslavia) Šibenka	6	11	5	1	560	518	+42
2.	(France) Orthez	6	11	5	1	540	499	+41
3.	(Italy) Binova Cucine Rieti	6	8	2	4	514	514	0
4.	(West Germany) Bayreuth	6	6	0	6	437	520	−83

== Semi finals ==
Team 1	Agg.	Team 2	1st leg	2nd leg
Zadar (Socialist Federal Republic of Yugoslavia)	147–159	(Socialist Federal Republic of Yugoslavia) Šibenka	78–70	69–89
Dynamo Moscow (Soviet Union)	172–178	(France) Limoges CSP	93–86	79–92

== Final ==
March 8, Deutschlandhalle, West Berlin

Team 1	Score	Team 2
Šibenka (Socialist Federal Republic of Yugoslavia)	86–94	(France) Limoges CSP

Šibenka: Dražen Petrović 12, Milan Zečević 8, Fabjan Žurić, Ivica Žurić, Živko Ljubojević 30, Sreten Đurić, Bruno Petani, Damir Damjanić, Branko Macura 8, Željko Marelja, Predrag Šarić 24, Srećko Jarić 4, Nenad Slavica.
Limoges: Didier Rose, Jean-Michel Sénégal 5, Glenn Mosley 17, Richard Dacoury 18, Ed Murphy 34, Didier Dobbels 4, Apollo Faye 16, Mathieu Faye, Hugues Occansey, Eric Narbonne, Jean-Luc Deganis., Olivier Garry.

1982–83 FIBA Korać Cup Champions

Limoges CSP
2nd title
