= KK Jolly Jadranska Banka Šibenik =

Jolly JBŠ
- Founded: 2009; 16 years ago
- Dissolved: 2017; 8 years ago
- Arena: Baldekin Sports Hall
- Capacity: 900 (if needed 1,726)
- Location: Šibenik, Croatia
- Team colors: Orange, Red and White
- Website: mkk.kkjolly-jbs.hr
Home	Away

Košarkaški klub Jolly Jadranska banka Šibenik (English: Jolly Jadranska banka Šibenik Basketball Club), commonly referred to as KK Jolly JBŠ, Jolly JBŠ or simply Jolly, was a men's professional basketball club based in Šibenik, Croatia. It was named after two of its major sponsors, local companies Jolly and Jadranska banka.

== History ==
The club was founded in 2009 as a male section of the prominent women's basketball club ŽKK Jolly JBS. Since its foundation, the club has achieved promotion in every season they have competed and in its last seasons (before the dissolve), they have played in the first tier of basketball in Croatia, the A-1 League. For sponsorship reasons club carried the name "KK Jolly Jadranska Banka".

As famous club KK Šibenka bankrupted, KK Jolly became the most prominent basketball club in the town.

In July 2017, owner and president Josip Stojanović-Jolly reported that the club would not compete in any category of the Croatian basketball in the following season, and was officially dissolved later.

== Season by season ==
Recent seasons
Season	Tier	League	Pos.	Chmp./Rel.	Croatian Cup	European competitions
2011-12	1	A-1 Liga	2	7	–	–
2012-13	1	A-1 Liga	4	4	–	–
2013-14	1	A-1 Liga	5	4	–	–
2014-15	1	A-1 Liga	6	1	–	–
2015-16	1	A-1 Liga	8	4	Quarter-final	–
2016-17	1	A-1 Liga	3	Quarter-final	Final	–

== Head coaches ==
- (Croatia) Nikša Bavčević (2011)
- (Croatia) Hrvoje Vlašić (2011–2013)
- (Croatia) Ivica Burić (2014)
- (Croatia) Mladen Erjavec (2014)
- (Montenegro) Momir Milatović (2014)
- (Croatia) Anđelko Matov (2014–2015)
- (Bosnia and Herzegovina) Ivan Velić (2015)
- (Croatia) Damir Milačić (2015–2016)
- (Bosnia and Herzegovina) Ivan Velić (2016–2017)

== Notable players ==
- (Croatia) Dino Butorac
- (Bosnia and Herzegovina) Jozo Brkić
- (Croatia) Mate Mrva
- (Croatia) Teo Petani
- (United States) Michaelyn Scott
