= Zdravko Čečur =

Bosnian basketball player (1950–2020)

- Zdravko Čečur in his playing days

Personal information
- Born: 15 May 1950 Mostar, PR Bosnia-Herzegovina, FPR Yugoslavia
- Died: 12 April 2020 (aged 69) Trebinje, Republika Srpska, Bosnia and Herzegovina
- Listed height: 2.09 m (6 ft 10 in)

Career information
- Playing career: 1969–1978
- Position: Center

Career history
- 1969–1977: Bosna
- 1977–1978: Pula

Career highlights
- Sixth April Award of Sarajevo (2009)

Zdravko Čečur (Serbian Cyrillic: Здравко Чечур; 15 May 1950 – 12 April 2020) was a Bosnian professional basketball player best known for his lengthy and passionate tenure with Bosna during the 1970s. A powerful center with a strong defensive presence, he helped Bosna rise through the Yugoslav league system and became one of the club’s most beloved figures. After retiring following the 1977–78 season in KK Pula, Čečur remained an influential personality in Bosnian basketball culture. In 2009, he was a recipient of the prestigious Sixth April Award of Sarajevo for his contributions to the sport.

== Early life ==
Zdravko Čečur was born in 1950 in Mostar, then part of the Socialist Federal Republic of Yugoslavia. He grew up in Trebinje, where he developed his early basketball skills before moving to Sarajevo to join Bosna.

== Playing career ==
Čečur spent the majority of his playing career with Bosna, beginning in the late 1960s. Known for his physical play, rebounding and defensive intensity, he was a key member of the team’s climb from lower divisions into the premier competition of Yugoslav basketball. He played alongside notable teammates and became a fan favorite for his commitment and spirited personality on the court.

For his final professional season, Čečur played for KK Pula during the 1977–78 season before retiring from competitive basketball.

== Legacy ==
Čečur remained a celebrated figure in Bosnian basketball long after his retirement and had the reputation of a bohemian who enjoyed the company of musicians, poets and intellectuals, including Abdulah Sidran, Davorin Popović and former teammate, Mirza Delibašić. In recognition of his impact on the sport, he was awarded the Sixth April Award of Sarajevo in 2009 as part of the Univerzitetsko sportsko društvo Bosna, the highest civic honor bestowed by the City of Sarajevo. He was remembered fondly by peers, opponents, and fans for his fierce competitive spirit and lasting contributions to Bosna’s development as a basketball club.

== Personal life and death ==
With the onset of the Bosnian War, Čečur moved back to his homeotown of Trebinje. In later years, he battled illness and spent his final years in a retirement home. He died on 12 April 2020, at the age of 70. His death was widely mourned across Bosnian and former Yugoslav sports media, highlighting his legacy as a beloved basketball figure.
