= 1981–82 FIBA Korać Cup =

- League: FIBA Korać Cup
- Sport: Basketball

Final
- Champions: (France) Limoges CSP
- Runners-up: (Socialist Federal Republic of Yugoslavia) Šibenka

FIBA Korać Cup seasons
- ← 1980–81 1982–83 →

The 1981–82 FIBA Korać Cup was the 11th edition of FIBA's Korać Cup basketball competition. The French Limoges CSP defeated the Yugoslav Šibenka in the final on March 18, 1982 in Padua, Italy.

== First round ==
Team 1	Agg.	Team 2	1st leg	2nd leg
Latte Sole Bologna (Italy)	173–158	(Greece) Iraklis	86–56	87–102
PAOK (Greece)	201–164	(Austria) Stock 84 Wels	103–72	98–92
Hapoel Haifa (Israel)	150–160	(Belgium) Spa Verviers-Pepinster	66–69	84–91
Vasas (Hungary)	123–115	(Turkey) Karşıyaka	65–51	58–64
Acqua Fabia Rieti (Italy)	149–146	(France) Avignon	88–70	61–76
Nationale-Nederlanden Donar (Netherlands)	199–182	(England) Solent Stars	107–77	92–105
OAR Ferrol (Spain)	187–140	(Portugal) Sangalhos	108–72	79–68
Sparta Bertrange (Luxembourg)	122–205	(Belgium) Anderlecht	56–104	66–101
Olympiacos (Greece)	139–156	(Belgium) Maes Pils	79–60	60–96
T71 Dudelange (Luxembourg)	139–200	(France) Limoges CSP	83–92	56–108

== Second round ==
Team 1	Agg.	Team 2	1st leg	2nd leg
Latte Sole Bologna (Italy)	163–146	(Czechoslovakia) Zbrojovka Brno	104–86	59–60
PAOK (Greece)	181–197	(Socialist Federal Republic of Yugoslavia) Zadar	88–94	93–103
Spa Verviers-Pepinster (Belgium)	178–182	(Turkey) Efes Pilsen	91–90	87–92
Vasas (Hungary)	166–156	(Belgium) CEP Fleurus	95–69	71–87
Acqua Fabia Rieti (Italy)	163–157	(Socialist Federal Republic of Yugoslavia) Iskra Olimpija	86–82	77–75
Nationale-Nederlanden Donar (Netherlands)	187–189	(Spain) Cotonificio	104–82	83–107
Tours (France)	194–170	(Spain) OAR Ferrol	98–70	96–100
Anderlecht (Belgium)	165–169	(France) Orthez	93–86	72–83
Miñón Valladolid (Spain)	171–157	(Belgium) Maes Pils	100–79	71–78
Limoges CSP (France)	183–165	(Greece) Aris	106–77	77–88
Hapoel Tel Aviv (Israel)	189–195	(Socialist Federal Republic of Yugoslavia) Šibenka	101–97	88–98

Automatically qualified to round of 16

- (Spain) Joventut Sony (title holder)
- (Italy) Carrera Venezia
- (Socialist Federal Republic of Yugoslavia) Crvena zvezda
- (Soviet Union) Spartak Leningrad
- (Italy) Cagiva Varese

== Round of 16 ==
Key to colors
Top place in each group advance to semifinals

=== Group A ===
	Team	Pld	Pts	W	L	PF	PA	PD
1.	(France) Limoges CSP	6	10	4	2	561	549	+12
2.	(Spain) Cotonificio	6	10	4	2	579	554	+25
3.	(Italy) Carrera Venezia	6	9	3	3	587	563	+24
4.	(Soviet Union) Spartak Leningrad	6	7	1	5	498	559	−61

=== Group B ===
	Team	Pld	Pts	W	L	PF	PA	PD
1.	(Socialist Federal Republic of Yugoslavia) Zadar	6	10	4	2	580	544	+36
2.	(France) Orthez	6	9	3	3	559	562	−3
3.	(Spain) Joventut Sony	6	9	3	3	486	483	+3
4.	(Italy) Cagiva Varese	6	8	2	4	499	535	−36

=== Group C ===
	Team	Pld	Pts	W	L	PF	PA	PD
1.	(Socialist Federal Republic of Yugoslavia) Šibenka	6	11	5	1	585	538	+47
2.	(Italy) Acqua Fabia Rieti	6	10	4	2	579	516	+63
3.	(Spain) Miñón Valladolid	6	9	3	3	537	546	−9
4.	(Hungary) Vasas	6	6	0	6	466	567	−101

=== Group D ===
	Team	Pld	Pts	W	L	PF	PA	PD
1.	(Socialist Federal Republic of Yugoslavia) Crvena zvezda	6	10	4	2	570	525	+45
2.	(Italy) Latte Sole Bologna	6	9	3	3	538	535	+3
3.	(France) Tours	6	9	3	3	559	563	−4
4.	(Turkey) Efes Pilsen	6	8	2	4	511	555	−44

== Semi finals ==
Team 1	Agg.	Team 2	1st leg	2nd leg
Zadar (Socialist Federal Republic of Yugoslavia)	170–183	(France) Limoges CSP	92–84	78–99
Crvena zvezda (Socialist Federal Republic of Yugoslavia)	198–200	(Socialist Federal Republic of Yugoslavia) Šibenka	115–99	83–101

== Final ==
March 18, Palasport San Lazzaro, Padua

Team 1	Score	Team 2
Limoges CSP (France)	90–84	(Socialist Federal Republic of Yugoslavia) Šibenka

Limoges: Yves-Marie Vérove, Jean-Michel Sénégal 12, Richard Billet, Richard Dacoury 10, Ed Murphy 35, Irv Kiffin 21, Apollo Faye 2, Didier Rose, Benoit Tremouille, Eric Narbonne, Philippe Koundrioukoff, Jean-Luc Deganis 10.
Šibenka: Dražen Petrović 19, Predrag Šarić, Fabjan Žurić, Živko Ljubojević 16, Bruno Petani, Sreten Đurić, Damir Damjanić, Branko Macura 23, Željko Marelja 6, Robert Jablan, Srećko Jarić 16, Nenad Slavica 2.

1981–82 FIBA Korać Cup Champions

Limoges CSP
1st title
