= Apollo Faye =

French basketball player (born 1951)

Apollo Faye (born December 11, 1951, in Dakar, Senegal) is a French basketball player. Faye had 80 selections on the France men's national basketball team from 1979 to 1985.
