= KK Šibenik =

- Founded: 1973
- Dissolved: 2010
- Arena: Baldekin Sports Hall (Capacity: 3,600) (Note: Baldekin Sports Hall, than under the name of Dvorana Ivo Lola Ribar, had a capacity of 3,600, because of stands under the structures of the baskets.)
- Location: Šibenik, Croatia
- Team colors: Orange and Black
- Championships: 1 1. B Federal League
Home	Away

Košarkaški klub Šibenik, commonly referred to as KK Šibenik or simply Šibenik, was a men's professional basketball club based in Šibenik, Croatia. It was considered one of the best Croatian basketball clubs. In 2010, KK Šibenik bankrupted and was dissolved.

== History ==
The club was founded on 27 December 1973 under the name Šibenka. During six seasons altogether club managed to qualify for the Yugoslav First Basketball League, then one of the best leagues in Europe. In 1983 Šibenka won the Yugoslav Championship final game against Bosna, but was later controversially stripped of the title. Two seasons in a row, 1982 and 1983, Šibenka played the finals of the Korać Cup but were defeated in both occasions by French side Limoges.

The club operated a youth academy that produced several players, including Dražen Petrović.

In October 2010 the club was dissolved due to overwhelming financial problems. Currently, there are three basketball clubs in Šibenik - KK Jolly, GKK Šibenik and KK Dražen Petrović, but neither of them is considered a legal successor of the legendary KK Šibenik.

=== Name changes ===
- KK Šibenka (1973–1992)
- KK Šibenik Zagreb Montaža (1992–1994)
- KK Šibenik (1994–1995)
- KK Šibenik A.E.C. (1995–1996)
- KK Šibenik (1996–1999)
- KK Jadransko Osiguranje (1999–2000)
- KK Šibenik (2000–2005)
- KK Šibenka Dalmare (2005–2006)
- KK Šibenka (2006–2010)

=== Sponsors names ===
- KK Šibenik Zagreb Montaža (1992–1994)
- KK Šibenik A.E.C. (1995–1996)
- KK Šibenka Jadransko Osiguranje (1999–2000)
- KK Šibenik Sunce Osiguranje / Sunce Šibenik (2002–2004)
- KK Šibenka Dalmare (2005–2006)

== Head coaches ==
- (Socialist Federal Republic of Yugoslavia) Branko Bukić (1974–1976)
- (Socialist Federal Republic of Yugoslavia) Ivica Slipčević (1977–1978)
- (Socialist Federal Republic of Yugoslavia) Nikola Kessler (1978–1979)
- (Socialist Federal Republic of Yugoslavia) Vojislav Vezović (1979–1981)
- (Socialist Federal Republic of Yugoslavia) Faruk Kulenović (1981–1982)
- (Socialist Federal Republic of Yugoslavia) Vlade Đurović (1982)
- (Socialist Federal Republic of Yugoslavia) Dušan Ivković (1982–1987)
- (Socialist Federal Republic of Yugoslavia) Borislav Džaković (1987–1989)
- (Croatia) Anđelko Matov (1999)
- (Croatia) Čedomir Perinčić (1999–2000)
- (Croatia) Joško Tus (2000)
- (Croatia) Nenad Amanović (2000–?)
- (Croatia) Anđelko Matov (2004)
- (Croatia) Hrvoje Vlašić (2004–2005)
- (Croatia) Josip Pulja (2005–2006)
- (Croatia) Denis Bajramović (2006–2007)
- (Croatia) Nenad Amanović (2007–2008)
- (Croatia) Živko Badžim (2008–2009)
- (Croatia) Zoran Kalpić (2009)
- (Croatia) Ivica Gulin & (Croatia) Goran Zeljak (2009)
- (Croatia) Nenad Amanović (2009–2010)

== Notable people ==
=== Players ===
Note: Flags indicate national team eligibility at FIBA-sanctioned events. Players may hold other non-FIBA nationalities not displayed.

Criteria

To appear in this section a player must have either:

- Set a club record or won an individual award while at the club
- Played at least one official international match for their national team at any time
- Played at least one official NBA match at any time.

- (Turkey) Hüseyin Beşok
- (Croatia) Miro Bilan
- (Bosnia and Herzegovina) (Croatia) Vedran Bosnić
- (Croatia) Ivica Burić
- (Serbia) Srećko Jarić
- (Croatia) Miro Jurić
- (Croatia) Aleksandar Petrović
- (Croatia) Dražen Petrović
- (Italy) Nikola Radulović
- (Serbia) Zoran Slavnić
- (Croatia) Jeronimo Šarin
- (Croatia) Predrag Šarić
- (Croatia) Zoran Vrkić
- (Croatia) Luka Žorić
- (Croatia) Ivica Žurić
- (Serbia) Sreten Đurić
- (Croatia) Živko Ljubojević

=== Coaches ===
- (Croatia) Nenad Amanović
- (Serbia) Borislav Džaković
- (Serbia) Vlade Đurović
- (Serbia) Dušan Ivković
- (Bosnia and Herzegovina) Faruk Kulenović
- (Serbia) Zoran Slavnić
- (Serbia) Vojislav Vezović

== Historical rosters ==
- 1977–78 Yugoslav Second League,

Coach: (Socialist Federal Republic of Yugoslavia) Ivica Slipčević: Šuperba, Ninić, Smolić, Milković, Škaro, Živković-Laurenta, Nenad Amanović, Babić, Ramljak, Bujas, Aleksandar Petrović, Lakoš, Batinica

- 1978–79 Yugoslav Second League,

Coach: (Socialist Federal Republic of Yugoslavia) Nikola Kessler: Jurković, Anđelić, Smolić, Goran Furčić, Nikola Jelavić, Bruno Petani, Nenad Amanović, Babić, Kašić, Predrag Šarić, Aleksandar Petrović, Nenad Slavica

- 1979–80 Yugoslav First League,

Coach: (Socialist Federal Republic of Yugoslavia) Vojislav Vezović: Vučica, Fabijan Žurić, Kulušić, Ljubojević, Bruno Petani, Dražen Petrović, Zoran Slavnić, Branko Macura, Željko Marelja, Predrag Šarić, Babić, Nenad Slavica

- 1980–81 Yugoslav First League,

Coach: (Socialist Federal Republic of Yugoslavia) Vojislav Vezović: Vučica, Fabijan Žurić, Kulušić, Jablan, Bruno Petani, Dražen Petrović, Zoran Slavnić, Branko Macura, Željko Marelja, Predrag Šarić, Srećko Jarić, Nenad Slavica

- 1981–82 Yugoslav First League,

Coach: (Socialist Federal Republic of Yugoslavia) Faruk Kulenović (1981–82 FIBA Korać Cup): Dražen Petrović, Fabijan Žurić, Robert Jablan, Živko Ljubojević, Bruno Petani, Sreten Đurić, Damir Damjanić, Branko Macura, Željko Marelja, Predrag Šarić, Srećko Jarić, Nenad Slavica

- 1982–83 Yugoslav First League,

Coach: (Socialist Federal Republic of Yugoslavia) Vlade Đurović (1982–83 FIBA Korać Cup): Dražen Petrović, Milan Zečević, Ivica Žurić, Živko Ljubojević, Bruno Petani, Sreten Đurić, Damir Damjanić, Branko Macura, Željko Marelja, Predrag Šarić, Srećko Jarić, Nenad Slavica

- 1983–84 Yugoslav First League,

Coach: (Socialist Federal Republic of Yugoslavia) Vlade Đurović: Seper, Milan Zečević, Ivica Žurić, Živko Ljubojević, Bruno Petani, Sreten Đurić, Fabijan Žurić, Branko Macura, Željko Marelja, Predrag Šarić, Srećko Jarić, Zoran Livljanić

- 2004–05 ABA Goodyear League,

Coach: (Croatia) Hrvoje Vlašić: Danijel Papak, Jerome LeGrange, Ivan Duvančić, Denis Toroman, Dwayne Anthony Broyles, Josip Šarin, Zoran Huljev, Frano Čolak, Jure Rončević, Ivan Blaće, Srđan Helbich

== Members of Basketball Hall of Fame ==
- (Croatia) Dražen Petrović

== See also ==
- KK Šibenik in European and worldwide competitions
