= 1978–79 FIBA European Champions Cup =

- League: FIBA European Champions Cup
- Sport: Basketball

Final
- Champions: (Socialist Federal Republic of Yugoslavia) Bosna (1st title)
- Runners-up: (Italy) Emerson Varese

FIBA European Champions Cup seasons
- ← 1977–78 1979–80 →

The 1978–79 FIBA European Champions Cup was the 22nd season of the European top-tier level professional basketball club competition FIBA European Champions Cup (now called EuroLeague). The Final was held at the Palais des Sports, in Grenoble, France, on April 5, 1979. Bosna defeated Emerson Varese, by a result of 96–93. This final was the last in an impressive run of ten consecutive finals appearances for Varese, and the first of seven titles for any Yugoslav basketball federation club in the competition, which is also notable for Bosna's Žarko Varajić scoring 45 points, a still active record for the number of most points scored in a single EuroLeague Finals game.

== Competition system ==
- 22 teams (European national domestic league champions, plus the then current title holders), playing in a tournament system, entered a Quarterfinals group stage, divided into six groups that played a round-robin. The final standing was based on individual wins and defeats. In the case of a tie between two or more teams after the group stage, the following criteria were used to decide the final classification: 1) number of wins in one-to-one games between the teams; 2) basket average between the teams; 3) general basket average within the group
- The 6 group winners of the Quarterfinals group stage advanced to the Semifinals group stage, which was played as a single group under the same round-robin rules.
- The group winner and the runner-up of the Semifinals group stage qualified for the final, which was played at a predetermined venue.

== Quarterfinals group stage ==
Key to colors
Top place in each group advance to Semifinal group stage

=== Group A ===
	Team	Pld	Pts	W	L	PF	PA	PD
1.	(Spain) Real Madrid	6	12	6	0	683	443	+240
2.	(Hungary) Honvéd	6	10	4	2	586	576	+10
3.	(Austria) Klosterneuburg	6	7	1	5	476	531	-55
4.	(Egypt) Zamalek SC	6	7	1	5	446	641	-195

=== Group B ===
	Team	Pld	Pts	W	L	PF	PA	PD
1.	(Italy) Emerson Varese	4	8	4	0	455	303	+152
2.	(Luxembourg) Amicale	4	6	2	2	325	407	-82
3.	(Portugal) Sporting	4	4	0	4	340	410	-70

=== Group C ===
	Team	Pld	Pts	W	L	PF	PA	PD
1.	(Israel) Maccabi Elite Tel Aviv	4	7	3	1	376	299	+77
2.	(Belgium) Fresh Air	4	7	3	1	317	331	-14
3.	(Turkey) Eczacıbaşı	4	4	0	4	319	382	-63

=== Group D ===
	Team	Pld	Pts	W	L	PF	PA	PD
1.	(Greece) Olympiacos	6	10	4	2	522	431	+91
2.	(France) Moderne	6	10	4	2	515	438	+77
3.	(Poland) Wybrzeże Gdańsk	6	10	4	2	540	545	-5
4.	(Syria) Jalaa	6	6	0	6	431	584	-153

=== Group E ===
	Team	Pld	Pts	W	L	PF	PA	PD
1.	(Socialist Federal Republic of Yugoslavia) Bosna	6	11	5	1	573	419	+154
2.	(Czechoslovakia) Zbrojovka Brno	6	10	4	2	594	495	+99
3.	(Albania) Partizani Tirana	6	9	3	3	574	473	+101
4.	(Cyprus) AEL	6	6	0	6	323	677	-354

=== Group F ===
	Team	Pld	Pts	W	L	PF	PA	PD
1.	(Spain) Joventut Freixenet	6	11	5	1	598	508	+90
2.	(Netherlands) Parker Leiden	6	11	5	1	596	525	+71
3.	(Sweden) Södertälje	6	8	2	4	479	544	-65
4.	(England) Sutton & Crystal Palace	6	6	0	6	499	595	-96

== Semifinals group stage ==
Key to colors
Top two places in the group advance to Final

	Team	Pld	Pts	W	L	PF	PA	PD
1.	(Italy) Emerson Varese	10	17	7	3	819	763	+56
2.	(Socialist Federal Republic of Yugoslavia) Bosna	10	17	7	3	894	895	-1
3.	(Israel) Maccabi Elite Tel Aviv	10	16	6	4	839	779	+60
4.	(Spain) Real Madrid	10	16	6	4	976	910	+66
5.	(Spain) Joventut Freixenet	10	13	3	7	860	892	-32
6.	(Greece) Olympiacos	10	11	1	9	747	896	-149

== Final ==
April 5, Palais des Sports, Grenoble, attendance: 10,603

Team 1	Score	Team 2
Emerson Varese (Italy)	93–96	(Socialist Federal Republic of Yugoslavia) Bosna

1978–79 FIBA European Champions Cup
Champions

Bosna
1st Title

== Awards ==
=== FIBA European Champions Cup Finals Top Scorer ===
- (Socialist Federal Republic of Yugoslavia) Žarko Varajić ( (Socialist Federal Republic of Yugoslavia) Bosna, 45 points scored)
