= KK Kvarner =

- Leagues: Yugoslav League (1946–1991); Croatian League (1991–2008); Krešimir Ćosić Cup (1991–2009); Adriatic League (2001–02); Saporta Cup (1977–78)
- Founded: 1946
- Folded: 2009
- Arena: Dvorana Mladosti
- Capacity: 3,960
- Location: Rijeka, Croatia
- Team colors: White and Blue
Home	Away

KK Kvarner was a professional basketball club based in Rijeka, Croatia.

== History ==
KK Kvarner was founded in 1946 in Rijeka and in its history has changed several names for sponsored reasons (KK Istravino, KK Croatia Line Rijeka, KK Sava Osiguranje Rijeka, KK Triglav Osiguranje Rijeka). The club also performed under the name KK Kvarner Novi Resort. The club played one season (2001/02) in the Adriatic League. Due to the cancellation of the onset of the second division Croatian 'score for abortion in the 2008–09 season and accumulated debts 2009 club is shut down. KK Kvarner 2010 was founded in 2010 as a club's spiritual successor.

== Honours ==
=== Domestic competitions ===
- Yugoslav Cup
  - Runners-up (2): 1976–77, 1980–81

== Notable players ==
- (Socialist Federal Republic of Yugoslavia) Nikola Plećaš (1976–1978)
- (Croatia) Davor Kus (1996–2000)
- (Croatia) Matej Mamić (1996–1998)
- (Socialist Federal Republic of Yugoslavia) Aramis Naglić (1983–1989)
- (Italy) (Socialist Federal Republic of Yugoslavia) Ottone Olivieri (founder, 1946–?)
- (Croatia) (Italy) Nikola Radulović (1997–1998)
- (Croatia) Siniša Štemberger (1998–2004)
- (Croatia) Mario Stojić (1996–1997)
- (Croatia) Aleksandar Šćepanović (2002–2007)
- (Socialist Federal Republic of Yugoslavia) Dušan Tainer (founder, 1946–?)
- (Croatia) Goran Vrbanc (2003–2006)

== Notable coaches ==
- (Socialist Federal Republic of Yugoslavia) Faruk Kulenović (1982–1985)
