= FIBA EuroBasket 2001 squads =

The following is the list of squads for each of the 16 teams competing in the FIBA EuroBasket 2001. The competition was held in Turkey between 31 August and 9 September 2001. Each team selected a squad of 12 players for the tournament.

== Group A ==
=== France ===
France men's national basketball team roster
Players
Coaches

Pos.	No.	Name	Age – Date of birth	Height	Club
G	4	Éric Micoud	27 – 18 November 1973	1.85 m (6 ft 1 in)	Cholet	(France)
G	5	Laurent Sciarra	28 – 8 August 1973	1.95 m (6 ft 5 in)	ASVEL Basket	(France)
G	6	Tony Parker	19 – 17 May 1982	1.86 m (6 ft 1 in)	Paris Basket Racing	(France)
G/F	7	Laurent Foirest	27 – 18 September 1973	1.97 m (6 ft 6 in)	TAU Cerámica	(Spain)
G	8	Alain Digbeu	25 – 13 November 1975	1.96 m (6 ft 5 in)	FC Barcelona	(Spain)
F	9	Makan Dioumassi	29 – 21 July 1972	1.96 m (6 ft 5 in)	Lineltex Imola	(Italy)
F	10	Stéphane Risacher	29 – 26 August 1972	2.02 m (6 ft 8 in)	Olympiacos	(Greece)
F	11	Vassil Evtimov	24 – 30 May 1977	2.08 m (6 ft 10 in)	Maroussi	(Greece)
F/C	12	Cyril Julian	27 – 29 March 1974	2.06 m (6 ft 9 in)	SLUC Nancy Basket	(France)
C	13	Crawford Palmer	30 – 14 September 1970	2.08 m (6 ft 10 in)	Joventut Badalona	(Spain)
C	14	Jim Bilba	33 – 13 April 1968	1.98 m (6 ft 6 in)	ASVEL Basket	(France)
C	15	Frédéric Weis	24 – 22 June 1977	2.18 m (7 ft 2 in)	Unicaja Málaga	(Spain)

Head coach

- Alain Weisz

Legend

- Club – describes last
  club before the tournament
- Age – describes age
  on 31 August 2001

=== Israel ===
Israel men's national basketball team roster
Players
Coaches

Pos.	No.	Name	Age – Date of birth	Height	Club
C	4	Israel Sheinfeld	25 – 1 July 1976	2.07 m (6 ft 9 in)	Wright State University	(United States)
F	5	Shahar Gordon	21 – 7 June 1980	2.10 m (6 ft 11 in)	Ironi Ramat Gan	(Israel)
G	6	Derrick Sharp	29 – 5 October 1971	1.83 m (6 ft 0 in)	Maccabi Tel Aviv	(Israel)
G	7	Shalom Turgeman	31 – 7 April 1970	1.92 m (6 ft 4 in)	Hapoel Jerusalem	(Israel)
G	8	Lior Lubin	23 – 19 September 1977	1.92 m (6 ft 4 in)	Ironi Ramat Gan	(Israel)
SF	9	Ido Kozikaro	23 – 8 January 1978	2.02 m (6 ft 8 in)	Hapoel Galil Elyon	(Israel)
G	10	Afik Nissim	20 – 31 January 1981	1.80 m (5 ft 11 in)	Maccabi Rishon LeZion	(Israel)
G	11	Meir Tapiro	26 – 28 March 1975	1.92 m (6 ft 4 in)	Hapoel Jerusalem	(Israel)
F	12	Yoav Saffar	25 – 30 September 1975	2.05 m (6 ft 9 in)	Hapoel Galil Elyon	(Israel)
F	13	Barak Peleg	29 – 16 June 1972	1.94 m (6 ft 4 in)	Hapoel Jerusalem	(Israel)
C	14	Yaniv Green	21 – 16 May 1980	2.06 m (6 ft 9 in)	Bnei Herzliya	(Israel)
F	15	Moshe Mizrahi	21 – 4 April 1980	2.02 m (6 ft 8 in)	Hapoel Holon	(Israel)

Head coach

- Muli Katzurin

Legend

- Club – describes last
  club before the tournament
- Age – describes age
  on 31 August 2001

=== Lithuania ===
Lithuania men's national basketball team roster
Players
Coaches

Pos.	No.	Name	Age – Date of birth	Height	Club
G	4	Šarūnas Jasikevičius	25 – 5 March 1976	1.92 m (6 ft 4 in)	FC Barcelona	(Spain)
F	5	Mindaugas Žukauskas	26 – 24 August 1975	2.01 m (6 ft 7 in)	Union Olimpija	(Slovenia)
F	6	Mindaugas Timinskas	27 – 28 March 1974	2.00 m (6 ft 7 in)	TAU Cerámica	(Spain)
F	7	Saulius Štombergas	27 – 14 December 1973	2.02 m (6 ft 8 in)	TAU Cerámica	(Spain)
G	8	Ramūnas Šiškauskas	22 – 10 September 1978	1.98 m (6 ft 6 in)	Lietuvos rytas	(Lithuania)
F	9	Darius Songaila	23 – 14 February 1978	2.04 m (6 ft 8 in)	Wake Forest University	(United States)
G	10	Rimantas Kaukėnas	24 – 11 April 1977	1.92 m (6 ft 4 in)	Hapoel Galil Elyon	(Israel)
C	11	Eurelijus Žukauskas	28 – 22 August 1973	2.18 m (7 ft 2 in)	Paf Wennington Bologna	(Italy)
C	12	Robertas Javtokas	21 – 20 March 1980	2.10 m (6 ft 11 in)	Lietuvos rytas	(Lithuania)
G	13	Donatas Slanina	24 – 23 April 1977	1.91 m (6 ft 3 in)	Žalgiris Kaunas	(Lithuania)
C	14	Gintaras Einikis	31 – 30 September 1969	2.07 m (6 ft 9 in)	Śląsk Wrocław	(Poland)
F	15	Andrius Jurkūnas	25 – 21 May 1976	2.05 m (6 ft 9 in)	Žalgiris Kaunas	(Lithuania)

Head coach

- Jonas Kazlauskas

Legend

- Club – describes last
  club before the tournament
- Age – describes age
  on 31 August 2001

=== Ukraine ===
Ukraine men's national basketball team roster
Players
Coaches

Pos.	No.	Name	Age – Date of birth	Height	Club
G	4	Andriy Lebedev	21 – 12 October 1979	1.89 m (6 ft 2 in)	BC Kyiv	(Ukraine)
F	5	Vadym Pudzyrey	–
F	6	Viktor Kobzystyy	–
C	7	Stanislav Balashov	22 – 2 June 1979	2.11 m (6 ft 11 in)
G	8	Viacheslav Ievstratenko	26 – 14 October 1974	1.91 m (6 ft 3 in)
C	9	Sergei Lishouk	19 – 31 March 1982	2.10 m (6 ft 11 in)	Pulsar Rovno	(Ukraine)
F	10	Nikolay Khryapa	22 – 7 June 1979	2.06 m (6 ft 9 in)	Avtodor Saratov	(Russia)
C	11	Oleksandr Okunskyy	30 – 13 July 1971	2.14 m (7 ft 0 in)
PF	12	Dmytro Markov	–
F	13	Dmytro Korablov	23 – 4 October 1977	1.99 m (6 ft 6 in)
G	14	Oleksandr Rayevskyy	25 – 31 August 1976	1.77 m (5 ft 10 in)
F	15	Volodymyr Ryzhov	–

Head coach

- Hennadij Zaščuk

Legend

- Club – describes last
  club before the tournament
- Age – describes age
  on 31 August 2001

== Group B ==
=== Latvia ===
Latvia men's national basketball team roster
Players
Coaches

Pos.	No.	Name	Age – Date of birth	Height	Club
F	4	Uvis Helmanis	29 – 10 June 1972	2.04 m (6 ft 8 in)	Śląsk Wrocław	(Poland)
G	5	Aigars Vītols	25 – 15 February 1976	1.94 m (6 ft 4 in)	Ventspils	(Latvia)
F	6	Kaspars Cipruss	19 – 2 February 1982	2.07 m (6 ft 9 in)	Telit Trieste	(Italy)
G	7	Roberts Štelmahers	26 – 19 November 1974	1.75 m (5 ft 9 in)	Pınar Karşıyaka	(Turkey)
G	8	Edmunds Valeiko	29 – 22 June 1972	1.88 m (6 ft 2 in)	BC Rakvere	(Estonia)
F	9	Māris Ļaksa	19 – 8 September 1981	2.02 m (6 ft 8 in)	Providence College	(United States)
G	10	Kristaps Valters	19 – 18 September 1981	1.88 m (6 ft 2 in)	Antalya BB	(Turkey)
G	11	Raimonds Miglinieks	31 – 16 July 1970	1.88 m (6 ft 2 in)	Śląsk Wrocław	(Poland)
F	12	Ainars Bagatskis	34 – 29 March 1967	1.98 m (6 ft 6 in)	JDA Dijon	(France)
C	13	Raitis Grafs	20 – 12 July 1981	2.08 m (6 ft 10 in)	Valparaiso Crusaders	(United States)
C	14	Kaspars Kambala	22 – 13 December 1978	2.05 m (6 ft 9 in)	University of Nevada, Las Vegas	(United States)
F	15	Arnis Vecvagars	27 – 12 April 1974	1.97 m (6 ft 6 in)	BK LMT	(Latvia)

Head coach

- Armands Krauliņš

Legend

- Club – describes last
  club before the tournament
- Age – describes age
  on 31 August 2001

=== Slovenia ===
Slovenia men's national basketball team roster
Players
Coaches

Pos.	No.	Name	Age – Date of birth	Height	Club	Ctr.
PG	4	Beno Udrih	19 – 5 July 1982	1.90 m (6 ft 3 in)	Union Olimpija	(Slovenia)
G	5	Jaka Lakovič	23 – 9 July 1978	1.76 m (5 ft 9 in)	Geoplin Slovan	(Slovenia)
G	6	Boris Gorenc	27 – 3 December 1973	1.98 m (6 ft 6 in)	Montepaschi Siena	(Italy)
PG	7	Sani Bečirovič	20 – 19 May 1981	1.95 m (6 ft 5 in)	Union Olimpija	(Slovenia)
C	8	Marijan Kraljević	31 – 30 April 1970	2.11 m (6 ft 11 in)	Pezinok	(Slovakia)
F	9	Matjaž Smodiš	21 – 13 December 1979	2.05 m (6 ft 9 in)	Kinder Bologna	(Italy)
F	10	Marko Tušek	26 – 17 July 1975	2.07 m (6 ft 9 in)	Scavolini Pesaro	(Italy)
F	11	Goran Jagodnik	27 – 23 May 1974	2.02 m (6 ft 8 in)	Mydonose Kolejliler	(Turkey)
G/F	12	Marko Milič	24 – 7 May 1977	2.00 m (6 ft 7 in)	Real Madrid	(Spain)
C	13	Ivica Jurković	28 – 26 March 1973	2.05 m (6 ft 9 in)	Türk Telekom	(Turkey)
G	14	Ariel McDonald	29 – 13 January 1972	1.91 m (6 ft 3 in)	Maccabi Tel Aviv	(Israel)
C	15	Radoslav Nesterovič	25 – 30 May 1976	2.13 m (7 ft 0 in)	Minnesota Timberwolves	(United States)

Head coach

- Boris Zrinski

Legend

- Club – describes last
  club before the tournament
- Age – describes age
  on 31 August 2001

=== Spain ===
Spain men's national basketball team roster
Players
Coaches

Pos.	No.	Name	Age – Date of birth	Height	Club
F	4	Pau Gasol	21 – 6 July 1980	2.15 m (7 ft 1 in)	FC Barcelona	(Spain)
F	5	Chuck Kornegay	26 – 28 September 1974	2.06 m (6 ft 9 in)	Caja San Fernando	(Spain)
G	6	Paco Vázquez	27 – 7 March 1974	1.91 m (6 ft 3 in)	Unicaja Málaga	(Spain)
G	7	Juan Carlos Navarro	21 – 13 June 1980	1.93 m (6 ft 4 in)	FC Barcelona	(Spain)
G	8	Ignacio Rodríguez	30 – 2 September 1970	1.88 m (6 ft 2 in)	FC Barcelona	(Spain)
F	9	Felipe Reyes	21 – 16 March 1980	2.03 m (6 ft 8 in)	Adecco Estudiantes	(Spain)
F	10	Carlos Jiménez	25 – 10 February 1976	2.05 m (6 ft 9 in)	Adecco Estudiantes	(Spain)
F	11	Lucio Angulo	28 – 9 April 1973	2.00 m (6 ft 7 in)	Real Madrid	(Spain)
F	12	José Antonio Paraíso	30 – 20 April 1971	2.03 m (6 ft 8 in)	Cáceres	(Spain)
PG	13	Raül López	21 – 15 April 1980	1.86 m (6 ft 1 in)	Real Madrid	(Spain)
C	14	Alfonso Reyes	29 – 19 September 1971	2.02 m (6 ft 8 in)	Adecco Estudiantes	(Spain)
SF	15	Jorge Garbajosa	23 – 19 December 1977	2.07 m (6 ft 9 in)	Benetton Treviso	(Italy)

Head coach

- Javier Imbroda

Legend

- Club – describes last
  club before the tournament
- Age – describes age
  on 31 August 2001

=== Turkey ===
Turkey men's national basketball team roster
Players
Coaches

Pos.	No.	Name	Age – Date of birth	Height	Club
G	4	Kerem Tunçeri	22 – 14 April 1979	1.88 m (6 ft 2 in)	Efes Pilsen	(Turkey)
F	5	Hedo Türkoğlu	22 – 19 March 1979	2.03 m (6 ft 8 in)	Sacramento Kings	(United States)
F	6	Mirsad Türkcan	25 – 7 June 1976	2.05 m (6 ft 9 in)	Paris Basket Racing	(France)
G	7	Orhun Ene	34 – 1 February 1967	1.77 m (5 ft 10 in)	Galatasaray	(Turkey)
C	8	Asım Pars	25 – 1 April 1976	2.12 m (6 ft 11 in)	Fenerbahçe	(Turkey)
G	9	Harun Erdenay	33 – 27 May 1968	1.90 m (6 ft 3 in)	Ülkerspor	(Turkey)
SG	10	İbrahim Kutluay	27 – 7 January 1974	1.98 m (6 ft 6 in)	A.E.K. Athens	(Greece)
F/C	11	Kaya Peker	21 – 2 August 1980	2.07 m (6 ft 9 in)	Efes Pilsen	(Turkey)
C	12	Hüseyin Beşok	26 – 2 August 1975	2.12 m (6 ft 11 in)	Efes Pilsen	(Turkey)
F	13	Mehmet Okur	22 – 26 May 1979	2.10 m (6 ft 11 in)	Efes Pilsen	(Turkey)
F	14	Haluk Yıldırım	29 – 25 June 1972	2.01 m (6 ft 7 in)	Ülkerspor	(Turkey)
G	15	Ömer Onan	23 – 4 February 1978	1.94 m (6 ft 4 in)	Efes Pilsen	(Turkey)

Head coach

- Aydın Örs

Legend

- Club – describes last
  club before the tournament
- Age – describes age
  on 31 August 2001

== Group C ==
=== Croatia ===
Croatia men's national basketball team roster
Players
Coaches

Pos.	No.	Name	Age – Date of birth	Height	Club
G	4	Damir Mulaomerović	26 – 19 September 1974	1.95 m (6 ft 5 in)	Efes Pilsen	(Turkey)
G	5	Josip Vranković	32 – 26 October 1968	1.98 m (6 ft 6 in)	Prokom Trefl Sopot	(Poland)
G	6	Josip Sesar	23 – 17 January 1978	1.95 m (6 ft 5 in)	Cibona Zagreb	(Croatia)
G	7	Veljko Mršić	30 – 13 April 1971	2.03 m (6 ft 8 in)	Unicaja Málaga	(Spain)
C	8	Nikola Prkačin	25 – 15 November 1975	2.08 m (6 ft 10 in)	Cibona Zagreb	(Croatia)
G	9	Vladimir Krstić	29 – 27 July 1972	1.84 m (6 ft 0 in)	Anwil Włocławek	(Poland)
G	10	Gordan Giriček	24 – 20 June 1977	1.99 m (6 ft 6 in)	Cibona Zagreb	(Croatia)
C	11	Emilio Kovačić	33 – 11 January 1968	2.08 m (6 ft 10 in)	Union Olimpija	(Slovenia)
C	12	Mate Skelin	26 – 13 December 1974	2.12 m (6 ft 11 in)	Cibona Zagreb	(Croatia)
F	13	Matej Mamić	26 – 13 January 1975	2.02 m (6 ft 8 in)	Cibona Zagreb	(Croatia)
C	14	Nikola Vujčić	23 – 14 June 1978	2.11 m (6 ft 11 in)	Croatia Osiguranje	(Croatia)
C	15	Žan Tabak	31 – 15 June 1970	2.13 m (7 ft 0 in)	Indiana Pacers	(United States)

Head coach

- Aleksandar Petrović

Legend

- Club – describes last
  club before the tournament
- Age – describes age
  on 31 August 2001

=== Estonia ===
Estonia men's national basketball team roster
Players
Coaches

Pos.	No.	Name	Age – Date of birth	Height	Club
G	4	Tanel Tein	23 – 10 January 1978	1.95 m (6 ft 5 in)	Tartu Ülikool-Delta	(Estonia)
G	5	Indrek Varblane	33 – 5 May 1968	1.91 m (6 ft 3 in)	Nybit	(Estonia)
F	6	Toomas Kandimaa	26 – 19 June 1975	1.94 m (6 ft 4 in)	Tartu Ülikool-Delta	(Estonia)
G	7	Valmo Kriisa	27 – 18 May 1974	1.90 m (6 ft 3 in)	Södertälje Kings	(Sweden)
C	8	Margus Metstak	40 – 16 June 1961	2.05 m (6 ft 9 in)	Tallinna Ülikoolid-A. Le Coq	(Estonia)
F	9	Andre Pärn	23 – 21 September 1977	2.00 m (6 ft 7 in)	Plannja Basket	(Sweden)
F	10	Indrek Rumma	31 – 14 September 1969	1.98 m (6 ft 6 in)	Tallinna Ülikoolid-A. Le Coq	(Estonia)
F	11	Tarmo Kikerpill	24 – 13 June 1977	1.96 m (6 ft 5 in)	Tartu Ülikool-Delta	(Estonia)
F	12	Marek Noormets	30 – 14 June 1971	2.02 m (6 ft 8 in)	Tallinna Kalev	(Estonia)
F	13	Martin Müürsepp	26 – 26 September 1974	2.05 m (6 ft 9 in)	AEK	(Greece)
G	14	Toomas Liivak	30 – 10 September 1970	1.86 m (6 ft 1 in)	Tartu Ülikool-Delta	(Estonia)
G	15	Rauno Pehka	32 – 1 January 1969	1.88 m (6 ft 2 in)	Telindus Oostende	(Belgium)

Head coach

- Üllar Kerde

Legend

- Club – describes last
  club before the tournament
- Age – describes age
  on 31 August 2001

=== Germany ===
Germany men's national basketball team roster
Players
Coaches

Pos.	No.	Name	Age – Date of birth	Height	Club
G	4	Mithat Demirel	23 – 10 May 1978	1.81 m (5 ft 11 in)	Mitteldeutscher	(Germany)
F	5	Ademola Okulaja	26 – 10 July 1975	2.03 m (6 ft 8 in)	Casademont Girona	(Spain)
SG	6	Robert Garrett	24 – 18 March 1977	1.92 m (6 ft 4 in)	DJK Würzburg	(Germany)
G	7	Marko Pesic	24 – 6 December 1976	1.97 m (6 ft 6 in)	Alba Berlin	(Germany)
G	8	Stefano Garris	22 – 21 April 1979	1.99 m (6 ft 6 in)	TuS Lichterfelde	(Germany)
G	9	Drazan Tomic	27 – 27 April 1974	1.98 m (6 ft 6 in)	Élan Chalon	(France)
F	10	Marvin Willoughby	23 – 31 January 1978	2.02 m (6 ft 8 in)	DJK Würzburg	(Germany)
F	11	Stipo Papić	22 – 20 November 1978	2.06 m (6 ft 9 in)	Alba Berlin	(Germany)
C	12	Stephen Arigbabu	29 – 15 February 1972	2.06 m (6 ft 9 in)	Dafni	(Greece)
C	13	Patrick Femerling	26 – 4 March 1975	2.15 m (7 ft 1 in)	Olympiacos	(Greece)
F	14	Dirk Nowitzki	23 – 19 June 1978	2.13 m (7 ft 0 in)	Dallas Mavericks	(United States)
C	15	Shawn Bradley	29 – 22 March 1972	2.29 m (7 ft 6 in)	Dallas Mavericks	(United States)

Head coach

- Henrik Dettmann

Legend

- Club – describes last
  club before the tournament
- Age – describes age
  on 31 August 2001

=== FR Yugoslavia ===
FR Yugoslavia men's national basketball team roster
Players
Coaches

Pos.	No.	Name	Age – Date of birth	Height	Club
G	4	Dejan Bodiroga	28 – 2 March 1973	2.03 m (6 ft 8 in)	Panathinaikos	(Greece)
G	5	Veselin Petrović	24 – 1 July 1977	1.93 m (6 ft 4 in)	Partizan Belgrade	(Federal Republic of Yugoslavia)
G	6	Saša Obradović	32 – 29 January 1969	1.96 m (6 ft 5 in)	Budućnost	(Federal Republic of Yugoslavia)
PG	7	Igor Rakočević	23 – 29 March 1978	1.94 m (6 ft 4 in)	Budućnost	(Federal Republic of Yugoslavia)
F	8	Peja Stojaković	24 – 9 June 1977	2.06 m (6 ft 9 in)	Sacramento Kings	(United States)
G	9	Vlado Šćepanović	25 – 13 November 1975	1.98 m (6 ft 6 in)	Efes Pilsen	(Turkey)
G	10	Marko Jarić	22 – 12 October 1978	1.98 m (6 ft 6 in)	Kinder Bologna	(Italy)
C	11	Predrag Drobnjak	25 – 27 October 1975	2.12 m (6 ft 11 in)	Efes Pilsen	(Turkey)
C	12	Dragan Tarlać	28 – 9 May 1973	2.10 m (6 ft 11 in)	Chicago Bulls	(United States)
F	13	Dejan Milojević	24 – 15 April 1977	2.00 m (6 ft 7 in)	Budućnost	(Federal Republic of Yugoslavia)
C	14	Dejan Tomašević	28 – 6 May 1973	2.08 m (6 ft 10 in)	Budućnost	(Federal Republic of Yugoslavia)
F	15	Milan Gurović	26 – 17 June 1975	2.04 m (6 ft 8 in)	Telit Trieste	(Italy)

Head coach

- (Serbia and Montenegro) Svetislav Pešić

Assistant coach(es)

- (Serbia and Montenegro) Aleksandar Petrović

Legend

- Club – describes last
  club before the tournament
- Age – describes age
  on 31 August 2001

== Group D ==
=== Bosnia and Herzegovina ===
Bosnia and Herzegovina men's national basketball team roster
Players
Coaches

Pos.	No.	Name	Age – Date of birth	Height	Club
G	4	Nenad Marković	33 – 6 June 1968	1.95 m (6 ft 5 in)	Adecco Estudiantes	(Spain)
G	5	Gordan Firić	30 – 1 September 1970	1.95 m (6 ft 5 in)	Aris	(Greece)
G	6	Goran Terzić	23 – 18 March 1978	1.92 m (6 ft 4 in)
C	7	Samir Lerić	27 – 12 September 1973	2.06 m (6 ft 9 in)	Sloboda Tuzla	(Bosnia and Herzegovina)
F	8	Ivan Opačak	21 – 23 April 1980	2.00 m (6 ft 7 in)	Čelik Zenica	(Bosnia and Herzegovina)
C	9	Jasmin Hukić	22 – 15 August 1979	2.03 m (6 ft 8 in)	Sloboda Tuzla	(Bosnia and Herzegovina)
F	10	Siniša Kovačević	23 – 11 May 1978	2.00 m (6 ft 7 in)	Igokea	(Bosnia and Herzegovina)
F	11	Bariša Krasić	22 – 16 September 1978	1.98 m (6 ft 6 in)	Brotnjo	(Bosnia and Herzegovina)
G	12	Damir Mršić	30 – 25 October 1970	1.88 m (6 ft 2 in)	Troy Pilsener	(Turkey)
C	13	Ramiz Suljanović	22 – 16 August 1979	2.05 m (6 ft 9 in)
F	14	Elvir Ovčina	25 – 16 July 1976	2.10 m (6 ft 11 in)	Pivovarna Laško	(Slovenia)
F	15	Haris Mujezinović	27 – 21 January 1974	2.05 m (6 ft 9 in)	Galatasaray	(Turkey)

Head coach

- Sabit Hadžić

Legend

- Club – describes last
  club before the tournament
- Age – describes age
  on 31 August 2001

=== Greece ===
Greece men's national basketball team roster
Players
Coaches

Pos.	No.	Name	Age – Date of birth	Height	Club
G	4	Georgios Kalaitzis	24 – 29 October 1976	1.95 m (6 ft 5 in)	Panathinaikos	(Greece)
G	5	Nikos Chatzivrettas	24 – 26 May 1977	1.97 m (6 ft 6 in)	Iraklis	(Greece)
G	6	Theo Papaloukas	24 – 8 May 1977	2.00 m (6 ft 7 in)	Panionios	(Greece)
F	7	Dimitrios Papanikolaou	24 – 7 February 1977	2.02 m (6 ft 8 in)	Olympiacos	(Greece)
G	8	Giorgos Sigalas	31 – 31 July 1970	2.00 m (6 ft 7 in)	Aris	(Greece)
F	9	Antonis Fotsis	20 – 2 April 1981	2.09 m (6 ft 10 in)	Panathinaikos	(Greece)
F	10	Fragiskos Alvertis	27 – 11 June 1974	2.06 m (6 ft 9 in)	Panathinaikos	(Greece)
PF	11	Dimos Dikoudis	24 – 24 June 1977	2.08 m (6 ft 10 in)	A.E.K. Athens	(Greece)
F	12	Michalis Kakiouzis	24 – 29 November 1976	2.07 m (6 ft 9 in)	A.E.K. Athens	(Greece)
C	13	Lazaros Papadopoulos	21 – 3 June 1980	2.13 m (7 ft 0 in)	Iraklis	(Greece)
F	14	Efthimios Rentzias	25 – 11 January 1976	2.10 m (6 ft 11 in)	FC Barcelona	(Spain)
F	15	Giannis Giannoulis	25 – 5 June 1976	2.08 m (6 ft 10 in)	P.A.O.K.	(Greece)

Head coach

- Kostas Petropoulos

Legend

- Club – describes last
  club before the tournament
- Age – describes age
  on 31 August 2001

=== Italy ===
Italy men's national basketball team roster
Players
Coaches

Pos.	No.	Name	Age – Date of birth	Height	Club
F	4	Nikola Radulović	28 – 26 April 1973	2.07 m (6 ft 9 in)	Record Napoli	(Italy)
SG	5	Gianluca Basile	26 – 24 January 1975	1.92 m (6 ft 4 in)	Paf Wennington Bologna	(Italy)
F	6	Giacomo Galanda	26 – 30 January 1975	2.10 m (6 ft 11 in)	Paf Wennington Bologna	(Italy)
F	7	Gregor Fučka	30 – 7 August 1971	2.15 m (7 ft 1 in)	Paf Wennington Bologna	(Italy)
C	8	Denis Marconato	26 – 29 July 1975	2.11 m (6 ft 11 in)	Benetton Treviso	(Italy)
F	9	Alessandro De Pol	29 – 15 July 1972	2.04 m (6 ft 8 in)	Paf Wennington Bologna	(Italy)
PG	10	Andrea Pecile	21 – 30 March 1980	1.87 m (6 ft 2 in)	Scavolini Pesaro	(Italy)
G	11	Andrea Meneghin	27 – 20 February 1974	2.00 m (6 ft 7 in)	Paf Wennington Bologna	(Italy)
G	12	Alex Righetti	24 – 14 August 1977	2.00 m (6 ft 7 in)	Adr Roma	(Italy)
G	13	Michele Mian	28 – 18 July 1973	1.93 m (6 ft 4 in)	Snaidero Cucine Udine	(Italy)
C	14	Roberto Chiacig	26 – 1 December 1974	2.10 m (6 ft 11 in)	Montepaschi Siena	(Italy)
C	15	Andrea Camata	27 – 26 November 1973	2.15 m (7 ft 1 in)	Scaligera Müller	(Italy)

Head coach

- Bogdan Tanjević

Legend

- Club – describes last
  club before the tournament
- Age – describes age
  on 31 August 2001

=== Russia ===
Russia men's national basketball team roster
Players
Coaches

Pos.	No.	Name	Age – Date of birth	Height	Club
G	4	Anton Yudin	29 – 26 August 1972	1.93 m (6 ft 4 in)	UNICS Kazan	(Russia)
C	5	Aleksandr Bashminov	23 – 7 May 1978	2.12 m (6 ft 11 in)	Ural Great Perm	(Russia)
F	6	Sergei Panov	31 – 30 June 1970	2.03 m (6 ft 8 in)	Ural Great Perm	(Russia)
G	7	Igor Kudelin	29 – 10 August 1972	1.95 m (6 ft 5 in)	CSKA Moscow	(Russia)
G	8	Sergei Chikalkin	25 – 11 December 1975	1.96 m (6 ft 5 in)	Ural Great Perm	(Russia)
F/C	9	Nikita Morgunov	26 – 29 June 1975	2.11 m (6 ft 11 in)	Avtodor Saratov	(Russia)
G	10	Evgeniy Pashutin	32 – 2 June 1969	1.90 m (6 ft 3 in)	UNICS Kazan	(Russia)
SG	11	Zakhar Pashutin	27 – 3 May 1974	1.96 m (6 ft 5 in)	ASVEL Basket	(France)
G	12	Aleksandr Miloserdov	21 – 11 June 1980	1.93 m (6 ft 4 in)	Olympique Antibes	(France)
F	13	Andrei Kirilenko	20 – 18 February 1981	2.09 m (6 ft 10 in)	CSKA Moscow	(Russia)
C	14	Aleksey Savrasenko	22 – 28 February 1979	2.15 m (7 ft 1 in)	Peristeri	(Greece)
PG	15	Petr Samoylenko	24 – 7 February 1977	1.85 m (6 ft 1 in)	UNICS Kazan	(Russia)

Head coach

- Stanislav Yeryomin

Legend

- Club – describes last
  club before the tournament
- Age – describes age
  on 31 August 2001
