= FIBA EuroBasket 2003 squads =

The following is the list of squads for each of the 16 teams competing in the FIBA EuroBasket 2003, held in Sweden between 5 and 14 September 2003. Each team selected a squad of 12 players for the tournament.

== Group A ==
=== Bosnia and Herzegovina ===
Bosnia and Herzegovina men's national basketball team roster
Players
Coaches

Pos.	No.	Name	Age – Date of birth	Height	Club
G	4	Terrel Castle	30 – 12 September 1972	1.86 m (6 ft 1 in)	Strasbourg IG	(France)
F	5	Elvir Ovčina	27 – 16 July 1976	2.10 m (6 ft 11 in)	EWE Oldenburg	(Germany)
F	6	Damir Krupalija	24 – 13 June 1979	2.05 m (6 ft 9 in)	Anwil Włocławek	(Poland)
C	7	Samir Lerić	29 – 12 September 1973	2.06 m (6 ft 9 in)	Mitteldeutscher	(Germany)
	8	Želimir Stevanović	26 – 8 April 1977
C	9	Jasmin Hukić	24 – 15 August 1979	2.03 m (6 ft 8 in)	Union Olimpija	(Slovenia)
F	10	Siniša Kovačević	25 – 11 May 1978	2.00 m (6 ft 7 in)	Budućnost Podgorica	(Serbia and Montenegro)
F	11	Bariša Krasić	24 – 16 September 1978	1.98 m (6 ft 6 in)	Cibona Zagreb	(Croatia)
G	12	Damir Mršić	32 – 25 October 1970	1.88 m (6 ft 2 in)	UNICS Kazan	(Russia)
	13	Kenan Bajramović	22 – 24 May 1981	2.05 m (6 ft 9 in)	Čelik Zenica	(Bosnia and Herzegovina)
	14	Mirza Teletović	17 – 17 September 1985	2.05 m (6 ft 9 in)	Sloboda Tuzla	(Bosnia and Herzegovina)
F	15	Haris Mujezinović	29 – 21 January 1974	2.05 m (6 ft 9 in)	Panathinaikos	(Greece)

Head coach

- Draško Prodanović

Legend

- Club – describes last
  club before the tournament
- Age – describes age
  on 5 September 2003

=== France ===
France men's national basketball team roster
Players
Coaches

Pos.	No.	Name	Age – Date of birth	Height	Club
G	4	Moustapha Sonko	31 – 14 June 1972	1.93 m (6 ft 4 in)	Unicaja Málaga	(Spain)
F	5	Tariq Abdul-Wahad	28 – 3 November 1974	1.98 m (6 ft 6 in)	Dallas Mavericks	(United States)
C	6	Jérôme Moïso	25 – 15 June 1978	2.08 m (6 ft 10 in)	New Orleans Hornets	(United States)
G/F	7	Laurent Foirest	29 – 18 September 1973	1.97 m (6 ft 6 in)	TAU Cerámica	(Spain)
G	8	Alain Digbeu	27 – 13 November 1975	1.96 m (6 ft 5 in)	Real Madrid	(Spain)
G	9	Tony Parker	21 – 17 May 1982	1.86 m (6 ft 1 in)	San Antonio Spurs	(United States)
F	10	Makan Dioumassi	31 – 21 July 1972	1.96 m (6 ft 5 in)	Hyères-Toulon	(France)
F	11	Florent Piétrus	22 – 19 January 1981	2.01 m (6 ft 7 in)	Pau-Orthez	(France)
F/C	12	Cyril Julian	29 – 29 March 1974	2.06 m (6 ft 9 in)	Pau-Orthez	(France)
G	13	Boris Diaw	21 – 16 April 1982	2.05 m (6 ft 9 in)	Pau-Orthez	(France)
F	14	Thierry Rupert	26 – 23 May 1977	2.02 m (6 ft 8 in)	Paris Basket Racing	(France)
C	15	Ronny Turiaf	20 – 19 January 1983	2.06 m (6 ft 9 in)	Gonzaga University	(United States)

Head coach

- Alain Weisz

Legend

- Club – describes last
  club before the tournament
- Age – describes age
  on 5 September 2003

=== Italy ===
Italy men's national basketball team roster
Players
Coaches

Pos.	No.	Name	Age – Date of birth	Height	Club
F	4	Nikola Radulović	30 – 26 April 1973	2.07 m (6 ft 9 in)	Joventut Badalona	(Spain)
SG	5	Gianluca Basile	28 – 24 January 1975	1.92 m (6 ft 4 in)	Skipper Bologna	(Italy)
F	6	Giacomo Galanda	28 – 30 January 1975	2.10 m (6 ft 11 in)	Skipper Bologna	(Italy)
G/F	7	Matteo Soragna	27 – 26 December 1975	1.97 m (6 ft 6 in)	Lauretana Biella	(Italy)
C	8	Denis Marconato	28 – 29 July 1975	2.11 m (6 ft 11 in)	Benetton Treviso	(Italy)
F	9	Alessandro De Pol	31 – 15 July 1972	2.04 m (6 ft 8 in)	Auna Gran Canaria	(Spain)
G	10	Alex Righetti	26 – 14 August 1977	2.00 m (6 ft 7 in)	Lottomatica Roma	(Italy)
	11	Davide Lamma	27 – 23 April 1976		Reggio Calabria	(Italy)
G	12	Massimo Bulleri	25 – 10 September 1977	1.88 m (6 ft 2 in)	Benetton Treviso	(Italy)
G	13	Michele Mian	30 – 18 July 1973	1.93 m (6 ft 4 in)	Snaidero Cucine Udine	(Italy)
C	14	Roberto Chiacig	28 – 1 December 1974	2.10 m (6 ft 11 in)	Montepaschi Siena	(Italy)
F	15	Alessandro Cittadini	24 – 2 January 1979	2.07 m (6 ft 9 in)	Reggio Calabria	(Italy)

Head coach

- Carlo Recalcati

Legend

- Club – describes last
  club before the tournament
- Age – describes age
  on 5 September 2003

=== Slovenia ===
Slovenia men's national basketball team roster
Players
Coaches

Pos.	No.	Name	Age – Date of birth	Height	Club	Ctr.
PF	4	Goran Jurak	26 – 4 April 1977	2.03 m (6 ft 8 in)	Union Olimpija	(Slovenia)
G	5	Jaka Lakovič	25 – 9 July 1978	1.76 m (5 ft 9 in)	Panathinaikos	(Greece)
G	6	Boris Gorenc	29 – 3 December 1973	1.98 m (6 ft 6 in)	Metis Varese	(Italy)
G	7	Simon Petrov	27 – 17 January 1976	1.90 m (6 ft 3 in)	ASVEL Basket	(France)
C	8	Marijan Kraljević	33 – 30 April 1970	2.11 m (6 ft 11 in)	Lokomotiv Mineralnye Vody	(Russia)
F	9	Boštjan Nachbar	23 – 3 July 1980	2.07 m (6 ft 9 in)	Houston Rockets	(United States)
G	10	Alojzij Duščak	29 – 2 January 1974	1.95 m (6 ft 5 in)	Krka	(Slovenia)
F	11	Marko Tušek	28 – 17 July 1975	2.07 m (6 ft 9 in)	Lottomatica Roma	(Italy)
G/F	12	Marko Milič	26 – 7 May 1977	2.00 m (6 ft 7 in)	Euro Rosetto	(Italy)
C	13	Ivica Jurković	30 – 26 March 1973	2.05 m (6 ft 9 in)	Türk Telekom	(Turkey)
F/C	14	Jurica Golemac	26 – 27 May 1977	2.09 m (6 ft 10 in)	Efes Pilsen	(Turkey)
C	15	Primož Brezec	23 – 2 October 1979	2.16 m (7 ft 1 in)	Indiana Pacers	(United States)

Head coach

- Slobodan Subotić

Legend

- Club – describes last
  club before the tournament
- Age – describes age
  on 5 September 2003

== Group B ==
=== Germany ===
Germany men's national basketball team roster
Players
Coaches

Pos.	No.	Name	Age – Date of birth	Height	Club
G	4	Mithat Demirel	25 – 10 May 1978	1.81 m (5 ft 11 in)	Alba Berlin	(Germany)
F	5	Ademola Okulaja	28 – 10 July 1975	2.03 m (6 ft 8 in)	Unicaja Málaga	(Spain)
F	6	Jörg Lütcke	27 – 12 December 1975	2.00 m (6 ft 7 in)	Alba Berlin	(Germany)
G	7	Marko Pesic	26 – 6 December 1976	1.97 m (6 ft 6 in)	Alba Berlin	(Germany)
PF	8	Sven Schultze	25 – 11 July 1978	2.08 m (6 ft 10 in)	Bayer Giants Leverkusen	(Germany)
G	9	Steffen Hamann	22 – 14 June 1981	1.96 m (6 ft 5 in)	TSK uniVersa Bamberg	(Germany)
G	10	Misan Haldin	21 – 7 July 1982	1.93 m (6 ft 4 in)	Snaidero Udine	(Italy)
G	11	Stefano Garris	24 – 21 April 1979	1.99 m (6 ft 6 in)	Alba Berlin	(Germany)
C	12	Stephen Arigbabu	31 – 15 February 1972	2.06 m (6 ft 9 in)	RheinEnergie Köln	(Germany)
C	13	Patrick Femerling	28 – 4 March 1975	2.15 m (7 ft 1 in)	FC Barcelona	(Spain)
F	14	Dirk Nowitzki	25 – 19 June 1978	2.13 m (7 ft 0 in)	Dallas Mavericks	(United States)
C	15	Robert Maras	24 – 20 October 1978	2.15 m (7 ft 1 in)	Opel Skyliners	(Germany)

Head coach

- Henrik Dettmann

Legend

- Club – describes last
  club before the tournament
- Age – describes age
  on 5 September 2003

=== Israel ===
Israel men's national basketball team roster
Players
Coaches

Pos.	No.	Name	Age – Date of birth	Height	Club
G	4	Erez Katz	23 – 9 April 1980	1.90 m (6 ft 3 in)	Hapoel Jerusalem	(Israel)
G	5	Yotam Halperin	19 – 24 January 1984	1.93 m (6 ft 4 in)	Maccabi Tel Aviv	(Israel)
G	6	Derrick Sharp	31 – 5 October 1971	1.83 m (6 ft 0 in)	Maccabi Tel Aviv	(Israel)
F	7	Moshe Mizrahi	23 – 4 April 1980	2.02 m (6 ft 8 in)	Hapoel Jerusalem	(Israel)
C	8	Israel Sheinfeld	27 – 1 July 1976	2.07 m (6 ft 9 in)	Hapoel Tel Aviv	(Israel)
F	9	Gur Shelef	29 – 10 January 1974	2.01 m (6 ft 7 in)	Maccabi Tel Aviv	(Israel)
G	10	Tal Burstein	23 – 19 February 1980	1.98 m (6 ft 6 in)	Maccabi Tel Aviv	(Israel)
G	11	Meir Tapiro	28 – 28 March 1975	1.92 m (6 ft 4 in)	Hapoel Jerusalem	(Israel)
F	12	Yoav Saffar	27 – 30 September 1975	2.05 m (6 ft 9 in)	Maccabi Tel Aviv	(Israel)
SF	13	Ido Kozikaro	25 – 8 January 1978	2.02 m (6 ft 8 in)	Hapoel Galil Elyon	(Israel)
C	14	Yaniv Green	23 – 16 May 1980	2.06 m (6 ft 9 in)	Hapoel Tel Aviv	(Israel)
F	15	Shahar Gordon	23 – 7 June 1980	2.10 m (6 ft 11 in)	Maccabi Rishon LeZion	(Israel)

Head coach

- Muli Katzurin

Legend

- Club – describes last
  club before the tournament
- Age – describes age
  on 5 September 2003

=== Latvia ===
Latvia men's national basketball team roster
Players
Coaches

Pos.	No.	Name	Age – Date of birth	Height	Club
F	4	Uvis Helmanis	31 – 10 June 1972	2.04 m (6 ft 8 in)	TSK uniVersa Bamberg	(Germany)
G	5	Aigars Vītols	27 – 15 February 1976	1.94 m (6 ft 4 in)	Skonto	(Latvia)
C	6	Trojs Ostlers	24 – 7 October 1978	2.09 m (6 ft 10 in)	Skonto	(Latvia)
G	7	Roberts Štelmahers	28 – 19 November 1974	1.75 m (5 ft 9 in)	Union Olimpija	(Slovenia)
G	8	Armands Šķēle	20 – 4 September 1983	1.92 m (6 ft 4 in)	Anwil Włocławek	(Poland)
F	9	Edgars Šneps	31 – 13 April 1972	1.95 m (6 ft 5 in)	Skonto	(Latvia)
G	10	Kristaps Valters	21 – 18 September 1981	1.88 m (6 ft 2 in)	Skonto	(Latvia)
F	11	Māris Ļaksa	21 – 8 September 1981	2.02 m (6 ft 8 in)	Providence College	(United States)
F	12	Ainars Bagatskis	36 – 29 March 1967	1.98 m (6 ft 6 in)	Ventspils	(Latvia)
C	13	Raitis Grafs	22 – 12 July 1981	2.08 m (6 ft 10 in)	Valparaiso University	(United States)
C	14	Kaspars Kambala	24 – 13 December 1978	2.05 m (6 ft 9 in)	Efes Pilsen	(Turkey)
F	15	Arnis Vecvagars	29 – 12 April 1974	1.97 m (6 ft 6 in)	Ventspils	(Latvia)

Head coach

- Armands Krauliņš

Legend

- Club – describes last
  club before the tournament
- Age – describes age
  on 5 September 2003

=== Lithuania ===
Lithuania men's national basketball team roster
Players
Coaches

Pos.	No.	Name	Age – Date of birth	Height	Club
PG	4	Giedrius Gustas	23 – 4 March 1980	1.90 m (6 ft 3 in)	Žalgiris Kaunas	(Lithuania)
F	5	Mindaugas Žukauskas	28 – 24 August 1975	2.01 m (6 ft 7 in)	Montepaschi Siena	(Italy)
G	6	Arvydas Macijauskas	23 – 19 January 1980	1.92 m (6 ft 4 in)	Lietuvos rytas	(Lithuania)
F	7	Saulius Štombergas	29 – 14 December 1973	2.02 m (6 ft 8 in)	Žalgiris Kaunas	(Lithuania)
G	8	Ramūnas Šiškauskas	24 – 10 September 1978	1.98 m (6 ft 6 in)	Lietuvos rytas	(Lithuania)
F	9	Darius Songaila	25 – 14 February 1978	2.04 m (6 ft 8 in)	CSKA Moscow	(Russia)
G	10	Donatas Slanina	26 – 23 April 1977	1.91 m (6 ft 3 in)	Caja San Fernando	(Spain)
C	11	Eurelijus Žukauskas	30 – 22 August 1973	2.18 m (7 ft 2 in)	UNICS Kazan	(Russia)
C	12	Kšyštof Lavrinovič	23 – 11 November 1979	2.10 m (6 ft 11 in)	Ural Great Perm	(Russia)
G	13	Šarūnas Jasikevičius	27 – 5 March 1976	1.92 m (6 ft 4 in)	FC Barcelona	(Spain)
F	14	Dainius Šalenga	26 – 15 April 1977	1.98 m (6 ft 6 in)	Žalgiris Kaunas	(Lithuania)
F	15	Virginijus Praškevičius	29 – 3 April 1974	2.06 m (6 ft 9 in)	Ülkerspor	(Turkey)

Head coach

- Antanas Sireika

Legend

- Club – describes last
  club before the tournament
- Age – describes age
  on 5 September 2003

== Group C ==
=== Russia ===
Russia men's national basketball team roster
Players
Coaches

Pos.	No.	Name	Age – Date of birth	Height	Club
G	4	Vasily Karasev	32 – 14 April 1971	1.93 m (6 ft 4 in)	Lokomotiv Mineralnye Vody	(Russia)
C	5	Denis Ershov	22 – 12 March 1981	2.20 m (7 ft 3 in)
C	6	Fedor Likholitov	23 – 14 March 1980	2.10 m (6 ft 11 in)	Aris	(Greece)
C	7	Mikhail Soloviev	30 – 11 February 1973	2.05 m (6 ft 9 in)
G	8	Valentin Kubrakov	31 – 25 July 1972	1.95 m (6 ft 5 in)	Ural Great Perm	(Russia)
PG	9	Petr Samoylenko	26 – 7 February 1977	1.85 m (6 ft 1 in)	UNICS Kazan	(Russia)
F	10	Victor Khryapa	21 – 3 August 1982	2.03 m (6 ft 8 in)	CSKA Moscow	(Russia)
SG	11	Zakhar Pashutin	29 – 3 May 1974	1.96 m (6 ft 5 in)	CSKA Moscow	(Russia)
F	12	Sergei Monia	20 – 15 April 1983	2.03 m (6 ft 8 in)	CSKA Moscow	(Russia)
F	13	Andrei Kirilenko	22 – 18 February 1981	2.09 m (6 ft 10 in)	Utah Jazz	(United States)
G	14	Dmitri Domani	28 – 27 September 1974	1.98 m (6 ft 6 in)	Dynamo Moscow	(Russia)
C	15	Aleksey Savrasenko	24 – 28 February 1979	2.15 m (7 ft 1 in)	CSKA Moscow	(Russia)

Head coach

- Sergei Elevich

Legend

- Club – describes last
  club before the tournament
- Age – describes age
  on 5 September 2003

=== Serbia and Montenegro ===
Serbia and Montenegro men's national basketball team roster
Players
Coaches

Pos.	No.	Name	Age – Date of birth	Height	Club
F	4	Dušan Vukčević	27 – 14 November 1975	2.02 m (6 ft 8 in)	Montepaschi Siena	(Italy)
C	5	Dejan Koturović	31 – 31 March 1972	2.10 m (6 ft 11 in)	Virtus Bologna	(Italy)
G	6	Nebojša Bogavac	29 – 14 December 1973	1.99 m (6 ft 6 in)	Hemofarm Vršac	(Serbia and Montenegro)
G	7	Vule Avdalović	21 – 24 November 1981	1.94 m (6 ft 4 in)	Partizan Belgrade	(Serbia and Montenegro)
F	8	Peja Stojaković	26 – 9 June 1977	2.06 m (6 ft 9 in)	Sacramento Kings	(United States)
C	9	Đuro Ostojić	27 – 17 February 1976	2.10 m (6 ft 11 in)	Partizan Belgrade	(Serbia and Montenegro)
G	10	Marko Jarić	24 – 12 October 1978	1.98 m (6 ft 6 in)	Los Angeles Clippers	(United States)
C	11	Predrag Drobnjak	27 – 27 October 1975	2.12 m (6 ft 11 in)	Seattle SuperSonics	(United States)
F	12	Ognjen Aškrabić	24 – 28 July 1979	2.07 m (6 ft 9 in)	FMP	(Serbia and Montenegro)
PG	13	Miloš Vujanić	22 – 13 November 1980	1.90 m (6 ft 3 in)	Partizan Belgrade	(Serbia and Montenegro)
C	14	Kosta Perović	18 – 19 February 1985	2.18 m (7 ft 2 in)	Partizan Belgrade	(Serbia and Montenegro)
F	15	Milan Gurović	28 – 17 June 1975	2.04 m (6 ft 8 in)	Unicaja Málaga	(Spain)

Head coach

- Duško Vujošević

Assistant coach(es)

- Stevan Karadžić

Legend

- Club – describes last
  club before the tournament
- Age – describes age
  on 5 September 2003

=== Spain ===
Spain men's national basketball team roster
Players
Coaches

Pos.	No.	Name	Age – Date of birth	Height	Club
F	4	Pau Gasol	23 – 6 July 1980	2.15 m (7 ft 1 in)	Memphis Grizzlies	(United States)
	5	Roger Grimau	25 – 14 July 1978		Caprabo Lleida	(Spain)
G	6	Carles Marco	28 – 23 September 1974	1.80 m (5 ft 11 in)	Joventut Badalona	(Spain)
G	7	Juan Carlos Navarro	23 – 13 June 1980	1.93 m (6 ft 4 in)	FC Barcelona	(Spain)
G	8	José Calderón	21 – 28 September 1981	1.91 m (6 ft 3 in)	TAU Cerámica	(Spain)
F	9	Felipe Reyes	23 – 16 March 1980	2.03 m (6 ft 8 in)	Adecco Estudiantes	(Spain)
F	10	Carlos Jiménez	27 – 10 February 1976	2.05 m (6 ft 9 in)	Adecco Estudiantes	(Spain)
G	11	Alberto Herreros	–	2.00 m (6 ft 7 in)	Real Madrid	(Spain)
G	12	Rodrigo de la Fuente	26 – 26 November 1976	2.00 m (6 ft 7 in)	FC Barcelona	(Spain)
C	13	Antonio Bueno	22 – 25 September 1980	2.10 m (6 ft 11 in)	Joventut Badalona	(Spain)
C	14	Alfonso Reyes	31 – 19 September 1971	2.02 m (6 ft 8 in)	Real Madrid	(Spain)
SF	15	Jorge Garbajosa	25 – 19 December 1977	2.07 m (6 ft 9 in)	Benetton Treviso	(Italy)

Head coach

- Moncho López

Legend

- Club – describes last
  club before the tournament
- Age – describes age
  on 5 September 2003

=== Sweden ===
Sweden men's national basketball team roster
Players
Coaches

Pos.	No.	Name	Age – Date of birth	Height	Club
G	4	Paul Burke	31 – 2 August 1972	1.85 m (6 ft 1 in)	Etosa Alicante	(Spain)
G	5	Hakan Larsson	29 – 11 June 1974	1.84 m (6 ft 0 in)	Plannja Basket	(Sweden)
	6	Jens Stalhandske	25 – 19 April 1978
	7	Mats Levin	26 – 15 June 1977		Progresso Castelmaggiore	(Italy)
	8	Oluoma Nnamaka	24 – 14 September 1978		Telekom Bonn	(Germany)
G	9	Jonas Larsson	32 – 2 May 1971	1.92 m (6 ft 4 in)	Plannja Basket	(Sweden)
	10	Lesli Myrthil	26 – 23 April 1977		Sundsvall Dragons	(Sweden)
C	11	Joakim Blom	27 – 16 March 1976	2.11 m (6 ft 11 in)	TXU Energie Braunschweig	(Germany)
	12	Fredrik Jonzen	25 – 13 June 1978		Oregon Scientific Cantù	(Italy)
	13	Christian Maråker	20 – 24 September 1982		University of the Pacific	(United States)
C	14	John Pettersson	26 – 21 April 1977	2.04 m (6 ft 8 in)
	15	Daniel Dajic	26 – 19 June 1977		08 Stockholm Human Rights	(Sweden)

Head coach

- Jan Enjebo

Legend

- Club – describes last
  club before the tournament
- Age – describes age
  on 5 September 2003

== Group D ==
=== Croatia ===
Croatia men's national basketball team roster
Players
Coaches

Pos.	No.	Name	Age – Date of birth	Height	Club
G	4	Damir Mulaomerović	28 – 19 September 1974	1.95 m (6 ft 5 in)	Real Madrid	(Spain)
G	5	Marino Baždarić	24 – 25 November 1978	1.95 m (6 ft 5 in)	Union Olimpija	(Slovenia)
G	6	Marko Popović	21 – 12 June 1982	1.85 m (6 ft 1 in)	Zadar	(Croatia)
C	7	Sandro Nicević	27 – 16 June 1976	2.11 m (6 ft 11 in)	Le Mans	(France)
C	8	Nikola Prkačin	27 – 15 November 1975	2.08 m (6 ft 10 in)	Cibona Zagreb	(Croatia)
G	9	Zoran Planinić	20 – 12 September 1982	1.97 m (6 ft 6 in)	Cibona Zagreb	(Croatia)
G	10	Gordan Giriček	26 – 20 June 1977	1.99 m (6 ft 6 in)	Orlando Magic	(United States)
G	11	Hrvoje Perinčić	24 – 25 November 1978	1.98 m (6 ft 6 in)	Zadar	(Croatia)
F	12	Andrija Žižić	23 – 14 January 1980	2.06 m (6 ft 9 in)	Croatia Osiguranje	(Croatia)
F	13	Matej Mamić	28 – 13 January 1975	2.02 m (6 ft 8 in)	Cibona Zagreb	(Croatia)
C	14	Dalibor Bagarić	23 – 2 July 1980	2.17 m (7 ft 1 in)	Chicago Bulls	(United States)
C	15	Mate Skelin	28 – 13 December 1974	2.12 m (6 ft 11 in)	Skipper Bologna	(Italy)

Head coach

- Neven Spahija

Assistant coach(es)

- Edi Dželalija

Legend

- Club – describes last
  club before the tournament
- Age – describes age
  on 5 September 2003

=== Greece ===
Greece men's national basketball team roster
Players
Coaches

Pos.	No.	Name	Age – Date of birth	Height	Club
G	4	Dimitris Diamantidis	23 – 6 May 1980	1.96 m (6 ft 5 in)	Iraklis Thessaloniki	(Greece)
G	5	Nikos Chatzivrettas	26 – 26 May 1977	1.97 m (6 ft 6 in)	CSKA Moscow	(Russia)
G	6	Theo Papaloukas	26 – 8 May 1977	2.00 m (6 ft 7 in)	CSKA Moscow	(Russia)
F	7	Dimitrios Papanikolaou	26 – 7 February 1977	2.02 m (6 ft 8 in)	Makedonikos	(Greece)
G	8	Giorgos Sigalas	33 – 31 July 1970	2.00 m (6 ft 7 in)	Viola Reggio Calabria	(Italy)
F	9	Antonis Fotsis	22 – 2 April 1981	2.09 m (6 ft 10 in)	Panathinaikos	(Greece)
F	10	Fragiskos Alvertis	29 – 11 June 1974	2.06 m (6 ft 9 in)	Panathinaikos	(Greece)
PF	11	Dimos Dikoudis	26 – 24 June 1977	2.08 m (6 ft 10 in)	A.E.K. Athens	(Greece)
C	12	Jake Tsakalidis	24 – 10 June 1979	2.20 m (7 ft 3 in)	Phoenix Suns	(United States)
G	13	Christos Charissis	27 – 9 July 1976	1.90 m (6 ft 3 in)	Olympiacos	(Greece)
C	14	Efthimios Rentzias	27 – 11 January 1976	2.12 m (6 ft 11 in)	Philadelphia 76ers	(United States)
F	15	Michalis Kakiouzis	26 – 29 November 1976	2.07 m (6 ft 9 in)	Montepaschi Siena	(Italy)

Head coach

- Giannis Ioannidis

Legend

- Club – describes last
  club before the tournament
- Age – describes age
  on 5 September 2003

=== Turkey ===
Turkey men's national basketball team roster
Players
Coaches

Pos.	No.	Name	Age – Date of birth	Height	Club
G	4	Kerem Tunçeri	24 – 14 April 1979	1.88 m (6 ft 2 in)	Efes Pilsen	(Turkey)
F	5	Hedo Türkoğlu	24 – 19 March 1979	2.03 m (6 ft 8 in)	Sacramento Kings	(United States)
F	6	Mirsad Türkcan	27 – 7 June 1976	2.05 m (6 ft 9 in)	Montepaschi Siena	(Italy)
G	7	Ender Arslan	20 – 13 January 1983	1.85 m (6 ft 1 in)	Efes Pilsen	(Turkey)
F	8	Kerem Gönlüm	25 – 22 November 1977	2.09 m (6 ft 10 in)	Ülkerspor	(Turkey)
	9	Rasim Başak	23 – 17 February 1980		Oyak Renault	(Turkey)
SG	10	İbrahim Kutluay	29 – 7 January 1974	1.98 m (6 ft 6 in)	Panathinaikos	(Greece)
F/C	11	Kaya Peker	23 – 2 August 1980	2.07 m (6 ft 9 in)	Efes Pilsen	(Turkey)
C	12	Hüseyin Beşok	28 – 2 August 1975	2.12 m (6 ft 11 in)	Maccabi Tel Aviv	(Turkey)
F	13	Mehmet Okur	24 – 26 May 1979	2.10 m (6 ft 11 in)	Detroit Pistons	(United States)
F	14	Haluk Yıldırım	31 – 25 June 1972	2.01 m (6 ft 7 in)	Ülkerspor	(Turkey)
G	15	Ömer Onan	25 – 4 February 1978	1.94 m (6 ft 4 in)	Efes Pilsen	(Turkey)

Head coach

- Aydın Örs

Legend

- Club – describes last
  club before the tournament
- Age – describes age
  on 5 September 2003

=== Ukraine ===
Ukraine men's national basketball team roster
Players
Coaches

Pos.	No.	Name	Age – Date of birth	Height	Club
G	4	Andrii Lebediev	23 – 12 October 1979	1.89 m (6 ft 2 in)
G	5	Oleksandr Rayevskyy	27 – 31 August 1976	1.77 m (5 ft 10 in)
	6	Oleksandr Skutelnyk	–
C	7	Stanislav Balashov	24 – 2 June 1979	2.11 m (6 ft 11 in)
F	8	Artur Drozdov	22 – 23 October 1980	1.98 m (6 ft 6 in)
G	9	Sergiy Moskalenko	28 – 21 June 1975	1.94 m (6 ft 4 in)
F	10	Nikolay Khryapa	24 – 7 June 1979	2.06 m (6 ft 9 in)
C	11	Oleksandr Okunskyy	32 – 13 July 1971	2.14 m (7 ft 0 in)
G	12	Viacheslav Ievstratenko	28 – 19 October 1974	1.91 m (6 ft 3 in)
F	13	Alexander Lokhmanchuk	30 – 28 May 1973	2.04 m (6 ft 8 in)	SLUC Nancy	(France)
C	14	Andriy Botichev	28 – 9 April 1975	2.06 m (6 ft 9 in)
	15	Grigorij Khizhnyak	29 – 16 July 1974		Pamesa Valencia	(Spain)

Head coach

- Gennadi Zaschuk

Legend

- Club – describes last
  club before the tournament
- Age – describes age
  on 5 September 2003
