= Bosnia and Herzegovina men's national basketball team =

Men's national basketball team representing Bosnia and Herzegovina

Bosnia and Herzegovina
- FIBA ranking: 31 ▲2 (1 September 2026)
- Joined FIBA: 1992
- FIBA zone: FIBA Europe
- National federation: KSBIH
- Coach: Dario Gjergja
- Nickname(s): Zmajevi (The Dragons); Zlatni ljiljani (The Golden Lilies)

FIBA World Cup
- Appearances: None

EuroBasket
- Appearances: 11
- Medals: None
Home	Away

First international
- Bosnia and Herzegovina 97–69 Slovakia (Wrocław, Poland; 30 May 1993)

Biggest win
- Bosnia and Herzegovina 108–62 Cyprus (Tuzla, Bosnia and Herzegovina; 21 February 2025)

Biggest defeat
- Bosnia and Herzegovina 52–102 France (Tuzla, Bosnia and Herzegovina; 29 June 2018)

The Bosnia and Herzegovina men's national basketball team (Bosnian: Košarkaška reprezentacija Bosne i Hercegovine / Кошаркашка репрезентација Босне и Херцеговине) represents Bosnia and Herzegovina in international basketball competitions, and is governed by the Basketball Federation of Bosnia and Herzegovina. Until 1992, Bosnian basketballers played for Yugoslavia.

Bosnia and Herzegovina reached their first international tournament at the EuroBasket in 1993. They have competed 11 times at the event overall. The team has yet to qualify on the global level to play at the FIBA World Cup.

== History ==
Until 1992, Bosnia and Herzegovina was a part of Yugoslavia, which meant players born in Bosnia and Herzegovina played for the Yugoslavia national team. Between 1947 and 1992, the following Bosnia-born players were selected to play for the Yugoslavia national team at the biggest competitions (Olympics, World Cup, and EuroBasket) at least once: Mirza Delibašić, Dražen Dalipagić, Predrag Danilović, Zoran Savić, Ratko Radovanović, Borislav Stanković, Milan Bjegojević, Dragiša Vučinić, Sabit Hadžić, Emir Mutapčić, and Mario Primorac. During this time, Bosnia and Herzegovina's capital city, Sarajevo, was one of five locations where games were played during the 1970 FIBA World Cup; where Yugoslavia finished in first place, the team's first gold medal at the FIBA World Cup.

After gaining its independence from Yugoslavia, Bosnia and Herzegovina qualified to the EuroBasket for the first time in 1993. Entering the tournament, Bosnia and Herzegovina earned their first ever EuroBasket victory in their final Group A match against Sweden. The team would go on to make it to the quarter-finals before losing to the eventual bronze medalists Croatia, which sent the team into the classification phase to finish out the competition.

After a positive showing for the national team in their first EuroBasket appearance, they would fail to qualify for the tournament in 1995. However, Bosnia and Herzegovina would turn around to qualify for the continental showpiece five consecutive times (1997, 1999, 2001, 2003, 2005). Although after that stretch for the national team, they would only qualify for the Euros three times after 2005 until 2015. Heading toward qualification for EuroBasket 2017, Bosnia and Herzegovina came up short in their attempt to qualify to the EuroBasket for the first time since 2009.

For qualification to reach the 2019 FIBA World Cup, Bosnia and Herzegovina first went through European Pre-Qualifiers, where the team won four out of their six matches (4–2) to advance. Entering the first round of the qualifiers, the national team earned a tough win at home against Russia 81–76. After the win, Bosnia and Herzegovina would pull out one more victory during the rest of the first round of qualifying to position itself to advance. In the second and final round of 2019 World Cup qualifying, the team lost its first five matches by single digits before defeating Bulgaria. However, the five crucial losses ultimately eliminated the team from clinching qualification.

In 2022, Bosnia and Herzegovina were set to play in the EuroBasket 2022 but were in danger on missing out on the tournament due to a lack of funds, just weeks before the start. Eventually, the federation received 150,000 convertible marks in financial aid from the Bosnian government, to ensure participation in the tournament.

== Competitive record ==
=== FIBA World Cup ===
World Cup					Qualification		
Year	Position	Pld	W	L	Pld	W	L
1950 to 1990	Part of Yugoslavia				Part of Yugoslavia		
(Canada) 1994	Did not qualify				EuroBasket served as qualifiers		
(Greece) 1998	Did not qualify				EuroBasket served as qualifiers		
(United States) 2002	Did not qualify				EuroBasket served as qualifiers		
(Japan) 2006	Did not qualify				EuroBasket served as qualifiers		
(Turkey) 2010	Did not qualify				EuroBasket served as qualifiers		
(Spain) 2014	Did not qualify				EuroBasket served as qualifiers		
(China) 2019	Did not qualify				18	7	11
(Philippines) (Japan) (Indonesia) 2023	Did not qualify				12	6	6
(Qatar) 2027	To be determined				To be determined		
(France) 2031	To be determined				To be determined		
Total	0/8				30	13	17

=== Olympic Games ===
Olympic Games					Qualifying		
Year	Position	Pld	W	L	Pld	W	L
1936 to 1988	Part of Yugoslavia				Part of Yugoslavia		
(Spain) 1992	Did not enter				Did not enter		
(United States) 1996	Did not qualify				Did not qualify		
(Australia) 2000	Did not qualify				Did not qualify		
(Greece) 2004	Did not qualify				Did not qualify		
(China) 2008	Did not qualify				Did not qualify		
(United Kingdom) 2012	Did not qualify				Did not qualify		
(Brazil) 2016	Did not qualify				Did not qualify		
(Japan) 2020	Did not qualify				Did not qualify		
(France) 2024	Did not qualify				5	3	2
(United States) 2028	To be determined				To be determined		
Total	0/9				5	3	2

=== EuroBasket ===
EuroBasket					Qualification		
Year	Position	Pld	W	L	Pld	W	L
1935 to 1991	Part of Yugoslavia				Part of Yugoslavia		
(Germany) 1993	8th	9	2	7	7	5	2
(Greece) 1995	Did not qualify				10	4	6
(Spain) 1997	15th	5	1	4	10	7	3
(France) 1999	15th	3	0	3	10	9	1
(Turkey) 2001	13th	3	0	3	10	6	4
(Sweden) 2003	15th	3	0	3	10	6	4
(Serbia and Montenegro) 2005	15th	3	0	3	6	4	2
(Spain) 2007	Did not qualify				12	5	7
(Poland) 2009	Did not qualify				10	6	4
(Lithuania) 2011	19th	5	2	3	8	3	5
(Slovenia) 2013	13th	5	3	2	8	6	2
(France) (Croatia) (Germany) (Latvia) 2015	23rd	5	1	4	4	4	0
(Finland) (Israel) (Romania) (Turkey) 2017	Did not qualify				4	2	2
(Czech Republic) (Georgia (country)) (Italy) (Germany) 2022	18th	5	2	3	6	5	1
(Cyprus) (Finland) (Poland) (Latvia) 2025	13th	6	3	3	6	3	3
(Estonia) (Greece) (Slovenia) (Spain) 2029	To be determined				To be determined		
Total	11/15	52	14	38	121	75	46

== Results and fixtures ==
Win Loss

=== 2025 ===
27 November 2025 2027 FIBA World Cup qualifiers – 1st round	Turkey	93–71	Bosnia and Herzegovina	Istanbul, Turkey
21:00 (UTC+3)	Scoring by quarter: 29–20, 17–25, 21–13, 26–13
	Pts: Biberović 20; Rebs: Saybir 7 Asts: Sipahi 9	Boxscore	Pts: Alibegović 18; Rebs: Marić, Sulejmanović 4 Asts: Arslanagić 8	Arena: Turkcell Basketball Development Center; Attendance: 9,876; Referees: Wojciech Liszka (POL), Lorenzo Baldini (ITA), Ritvars Helmšteins (LAT)

30 November 2025 2027 FIBA World Cup qualifiers – 1st round	Bosnia and Herzegovina	72–74	Serbia	Sarajevo, Bosnia and Herzegovina
20:00 (UTC+1)	Scoring by quarter: 15–13, 24–22, 19–16, 14–23
	Pts: Castañeda 19; Rebs: Alibegović 7 Asts: Atić 5	Boxscore	Pts: Tanasković 24; Rebs: Dobrić, Tanasković 8 Asts: Dobrić 5	Arena: Mirza Delibašić Hall; Attendance: 4,500; Referees: Antonio Conde (ESP), Gatis Saliņš (LAT), Paulo Marques (POR)

=== 2026 ===
27 February 2026 2027 FIBA World Cup qualifiers – 1st round	Bosnia and Herzegovina	84–60	Switzerland	Tuzla, Bosnia and Herzegovina
20:00 (UTC+1)	Scoring by quarter: 20–12, 21–15, 23–16, 20–17
	Pts: Vrabac 15; Rebs: Sulejmanović 9 Asts: Atić 9	Boxscore	Pts: Schumacher 19; Rebs: Mambo 10; Asts: Schumacher 3	Arena: SKPC Mejdan; Attendance: 5,000; Referees: Georgios Poursanidis (GRE), Martin Horozov (BUL), Ioannis Agrafiotis (GRE)

2 March 2026 2027 FIBA World Cup qualifiers – 1st round	Switzerland	60–91	Bosnia and Herzegovina	Kriens, Switzerland
19:00 (UTC+1)	Scoring by quarter: 14–21, 20–29, 18–24, 8–17
	Pts: Mbala 9 Rebs: Granvorka 10; Asts: Schumacher 9	Boxscore	Pts: Musa 25; Rebs: Kamenjaš 8 Asts: Talić 6	Arena: Pilatus Arena; Attendance: 3,820; Referees: Ariadna Chueca (ESP), Gintaras Mačiulis (LTU), Ilias Kounellis (CYP)

2 July 2026 2027 FIBA World Cup qualifiers – 1st round	Bosnia and Herzegovina	75–82	Turkey	Zenica, Bosnia and Herzegovina
20:00 (UTC+2)	Scoring by quarter: 18–17, 21–17, 18–25, 18–23
	Pts: Garza 27; Rebs: Garza 8 Asts: Atić 6	Boxscore	Pts: Hazer 16; Rebs: Osman 11; Asts: Sipahi 7	Arena: Arena Zenica; Attendance: 3,500; Referees: Antonio Conde (ESP), Dariusz Zapolski (POL), Ritvars Helmšteins (LAT)

6 July 2026 2027 FIBA World Cup qualifiers – 1st round	Serbia	94–81	Bosnia and Herzegovina	Belgrade, Serbia
20:00 (UTC+2)	Scoring by quarter: 27–15, 27–20, 21–24, 19–22
	Pts: Jović 32; Rebs: Jokić 10; Asts: Jokić 11	Boxscore	Pts: Garza 16; Rebs: Alibegović, Garza 7 Asts: Talić 8	Arena: Aleksandar Nikolić Hall; Attendance: 7,249; Referees: Wojciech Liszka (POL), Gatis Saliņš (LAT), Lorenzo Baldini (ITA)

20 August 2026 Friendly	Bosnia and Herzegovina	69–60	Poland	Hrasnica, Bosnia and Herzegovina
19:00 (UTC+2)	Scoring by quarter: 21–14, 19–12, 11–18, 18–16
		Boxscore		Arena: Hrasnica Sport Hall

28 August 2026 2027 FIBA World Cup qualifiers – 2nd round	Bosnia and Herzegovina	78–76	Italy	Tuzla, Bosnia and Herzegovina
20:00 (UTC+2)	Scoring by quarter: 18–17, 16–10, 24–27, 20–22
	Pts: Nurkić 25; Rebs: Nurkić 13; Asts: Gegić 4	Boxscore	Pts: Fontecchio, Mannion 14; Rebs: Fontecchio, Melli 6 Asts: Mannion 6	Arena: SKPC Mejdan; Attendance: 4,850; Referees: Mārtiņš Kozlovskis (LAT), Michał Proć (POL), Edgard Ceccarelli (FRA)

31 August 2026 2027 FIBA World Cup qualifiers – 2nd round	Lithuania	78–73	Bosnia and Herzegovina	Vilnius, Lithuania
18:30 (UTC+3)	Scoring by quarter: 20–23, 22–23, 19–12, 17–15
	Pts: Tubelis 23; Rebs: Blaževič 6 Asts: Marčiulionis, Žemaitis 5	Boxscore	Pts: Nurkić 20; Rebs: Kamenjaš 9 Asts: Atić 6	Arena: Arena Vilnius; Attendance: 4,989; Referees: Yohan Rosso (FRA), Mihkel Männiste (EST), Geert Jacobs (BEL)

26 November 2026 2027 FIBA World Cup qualifiers – 2nd round	Iceland	vs.	Bosnia and Herzegovina	Reykjavík, Iceland
19:30 (UTC+0)
		Boxscore		Arena: Laugardalshöll

29 November 2026 2027 FIBA World Cup qualifiers – 2nd round	Bosnia and Herzegovina	vs.	Lithuania	Sarajevo, Bosnia and Herzegovina
18:00 (UTC+1)
		Boxscore		Arena: Zetra Sports Hall

=== 2027 ===
26 February 2027 2027 FIBA World Cup qualifiers – 2nd round	Italy	vs.	Bosnia and Herzegovina	Italy
--:-- (UTC+1)
		Boxscore

1 March 2027 2027 FIBA World Cup qualifiers – 2nd round	Bosnia and Herzegovina	vs.	Iceland	Bosnia and Herzegovina
--:-- (UTC+1)
		Boxscore

== Team ==
=== Current roster ===
Roster for the 2027 FIBA World Cup Qualifiers matches on 28 and 31 August 2026 against Italy and Lithuania.

Bosnia and Herzegovina men's national basketball team roster
Players
Coaches

Pos.	No.	Name	Age – Date of birth	Height	Club	Ctr.
C	0	Jusuf Nurkić	32 – 23 August 1994	2.13 m (7 ft 0 in)	Utah Jazz	(United States)
F	3	Amar Alibegović	31 – 31 March 1995	2.02 m (6 ft 8 in)	Granada	(Spain)
PG	4	Adnan Arslanagić	29 – 26 August 1997	1.83 m (6 ft 0 in)	Gießen 46ers Rackelos	(Germany)
G/F	5	Edin Atić	29 – 19 January 1997	2.01 m (6 ft 7 in)	Bosna BH Telecom	(Bosnia and Herzegovina)
SF	7	Adin Vrabac	32 – 27 January 1994	2.05 m (6 ft 9 in)	Bosna BH Telecom	(Bosnia and Herzegovina)
SG	9	Amar Gegić	28 – 14 February 1998	2.00 m (6 ft 7 in)	Spartak Subotica	(Serbia)
SF	17	Aleksandar Lazić	30 – 10 June 1996	2.01 m (6 ft 7 in)	Igokea	(Bosnia and Herzegovina)
G	19	Darko Talić	28 – 23 February 1998	1.92 m (6 ft 4 in)	Bosna BH Telecom	(Bosnia and Herzegovina)
SG	20	Asim Gutić	24 – 12 December 2001	1.90 m (6 ft 3 in)	Sloboda Tuzla	(Bosnia and Herzegovina)
C	33	Alija Islamović	25 – 10 May 2001	2.07 m (6 ft 9 in)	Bosna BH Telecom	(Bosnia and Herzegovina)
C	34	Kenan Kamenjaš	26 – 17 January 2000	2.05 m (6 ft 9 in)	Dubai	(United Arab Emirates)
C	55	Luka Garza	27 – 27 December 1998	2.10 m (6 ft 11 in)	Boston Celtics	(United States)
G/F		Vojin Ilić	26 – 9 August 2000	2.00 m (6 ft 7 in)	Unattached

Head coach

- (Croatia) Dario Gjergja

Assistant coach(es)

- (Bosnia and Herzegovina) Gordan Firić
- (Bosnia and Herzegovina) Marko Trbić

Legend

- (C) Team captain
- Club – describes last
  club before the competition
- Age – describes age
  on 28 August 2026

=== Depth chart ===
Pos.	Starting 5	Bench 1	Bench 2
C	Jusuf Nurkić	Kenan Kamenjaš
PF	Amar Alibegović	Miralem Halilović	Ajdin Penava
SF	Aleksandar Lazić	Adin Vrabac
SG	Amar Gegić	Tarik Hrelja
PG	Edin Atić	John Roberson	Adnan Arslanagić

=== Notable players ===
Current active players who have played for the national team:

Notable players roster
Players
Coaches

Pos.	No.	Name	Age – Date of birth	Height	Club	Ctr.
F		Rijad Avdić	28 – 2 July 1998	2.01 m (6 ft 7 in)	Gaziantep	(Turkey)
G		Sani Čampara	27 – 3 March 1999	1.90 m (6 ft 3 in)	Sloboda Tuzla	(Bosnia and Herzegovina)
PG		Xavier Castañeda	26 – 26 March 2000	1.90 m (6 ft 3 in)	Unicaja	(Spain)
PF		Nedim Đedović	29 – 16 February 1997	2.03 m (6 ft 8 in)	Unattached
SF		Nihad Đedović	36 – 12 January 1990	1.97 m (6 ft 6 in)	Unattached
F		Amsel Delalić	23 – 24 July 2003	2.02 m (6 ft 8 in)	DePaul Blue Demons	(United States)
F		Haris Delalić	32 – 24 April 1994	2.04 m (6 ft 8 in)	Unattached
C		Ibrahim Durmo	29 – 15 January 1997	2.00 m (6 ft 7 in)	Unattached
G		Faruk Duvnjak	20 – 14 July 2006	1.90 m (6 ft 3 in)	Igokea	(Bosnia and Herzegovina)
PF		Miralem Halilović	35 – 22 July 1991	2.08 m (6 ft 10 in)	Bosna Royal	(Bosnia and Herzegovina)
SG		Tarik Hrelja	20 – 9 May 2006	1.94 m (6 ft 4 in)	Igokea	(Bosnia and Herzegovina)
PG		Draško Knežević	33 – 3 February 1993	1.88 m (6 ft 2 in)	Unattached
C		Markus Lončar	30 – 8 April 1996	2.13 m (7 ft 0 in)	Unattached
F/C		Dusan Makitan	21 – 7 March 2005	2.04 m (6 ft 8 in)	Borac	(Bosnia and Herzegovina)
F/C		Fahrudin Manjgafić	29 – 21 January 1997	2.07 m (6 ft 9 in)	Sopron	(Hungary)
F		Nikola Marić	27 – 19 December 1998	2.04 m (6 ft 8 in)	Girona	(Spain)
SG		Zinedin Mulić	22 – 15 January 2004	1.99 m (6 ft 6 in)	Spars	(Bosnia and Herzegovina)
G/F		Džanan Musa	27 – 8 May 1999	2.02 m (6 ft 8 in)	Dubai	(United Arab Emirates)
F/C		Lazar Mutić	27 – 1 June 1999	2.04 m (6 ft 8 in)	Lietkabelis	(Lithuania)
PF		Ajdin Penava	29 – 11 March 1997	2.06 m (6 ft 9 in)	Śląsk Wrocław	(Poland)
SF		Alen Pjanić	29 – 5 March 1997	2.02 m (6 ft 8 in)	Würzburg	(Germany)
C		Imran Polutak	30 – 9 July 1996	2.09 m (6 ft 10 in)	Dinamo	(Croatia)
PG		John Roberson	37 – 28 October 1988	1.80 m (5 ft 11 in)	Erokspor	(Turkey)
C		Ismet Sejfić	32 – 7 September 1993	2.08 m (6 ft 10 in)	OSE Lions	(Hungary)
F		Njegoš Sikiraš	27 – 11 April 1999	2.06 m (6 ft 9 in)	Spirou	(Belgium)
C		Stefan Simanić	25 – 2 August 2001	2.07 m (6 ft 9 in)	Metalac	(Serbia)
F/C		Emir Sulejmanović	31 – 13 July 1995	2.04 m (6 ft 8 in)	Unicaja	(Spain)
PG		Eman Šertović	27 – 8 August 1999	1.95 m (6 ft 5 in)	OSE Lions	(Hungary)
C		Obrad Tomić	33 – 4 August 1993	2.08 m (6 ft 10 in)	Akademik	(Bulgaria)
C		Đorđe Topolović	25 – 7 July 2001	2.08 m (6 ft 10 in)	Igokea	(Bosnia and Herzegovina)
PG		Adi Zahiragić	31 – 24 February 1995	1.87 m (6 ft 2 in)	Unattached
PF		Jure Zubac	31 – 15 March 1995	2.03 m (6 ft 8 in)	Bosna Royal	(Bosnia and Herzegovina)

Legend

- Club – describes current club
- Age – describes age
  on 28 August 2026

== Records ==
Players in bold are still active.

Most appearances
Rank	Player	NT Career	Games
1.	**Adin Vrabac**	2015–	77
2.	Gordan Firić	1993–2006	63
3.	Samir Lerić	1993–2005	61
4.	Aleksandar Lazić	2017–2026	60
5.	Elmedin Kikanović (C)	2006–2018	59
6.	Jasmin Hukić (C)	1998–2005	54
7.	Kenan Bajramović (C)	2001–2011	52
8.	Mirza Teletović (C)	2003–2014	51
9.	Adis Bećiragić	1993–1999	45
10.	Nenad Marković (C)	1994–2001	43
11.	Elvir Ovčina	1997–2005	40
12.	Ermin Jazvin	2001–2011	39

Most points scored
Rank	Player	NT Career	Points
1.	Nenad Marković (C)	1994–2001	840
2.	**Džanan Musa**		698
3.	Mirza Teletović (C)	2003–2014	655
4.	Gordan Firić	1993–2006	639
5.	Jasmin Hukić (C)	1998–2005	581
6.	**Edin Atić**	2017-	510
7.	Elmedin Kikanović (C)	2006–2018	500
8.	Samir Avdić (C)	1993–1997	390
9.	Samir Lerić	1993–2005	388
10.	Elvir Ovčina	1997–2005	376
11.	Damir Mršić	2000–2006	345
12.	Kenan Bajramović (C)	2001–2011	342

== Head coach history ==
- (Bosnia and Herzegovina) Ibrahim Krehić – (1993)
- (Bosnia and Herzegovina) Mirza Delibašić – (1993)
- (Bosnia and Herzegovina) Faruk Kulenović – (1993–1995)
- (Bosnia and Herzegovina) (Bosnia and Herzegovina) Sabit Hadžić – (1995–2001)
- (Bosnia and Herzegovina) Draško Prodanović – (2001–2003)
- (Bosnia and Herzegovina) Mensur Bajramović – (2004–2006)
- (Bosnia and Herzegovina) Nenad Marković – (2006–2008)
- (Bosnia and Herzegovina) Mensur Bajramović – (2008–2010)
- (Bosnia and Herzegovina) Sabit Hadžić – (2010–2012)
- (Croatia) Aleksandar Petrović – (2012–2013)
- (Montenegro) Duško Ivanović – (2014–2015)
- (Croatia) Damir Mulaomerović – (2016)
- (Serbia) Duško Vujošević – (2017–2018)
- (Croatia) Jasmin Repeša – (2018)
- (Bosnia and Herzegovina) Vedran Bosnić – (2018–2022)
- (Bosnia and Herzegovina) Adis Bećiragić – (2022–2025)
- (Croatia) Dario Gjergja – (2025–present)

== Past rosters ==
1993 EuroBasket: finished 8th among 16 teams

4 Samir Selešković, 5 Gordan Firić, 6 Adis Bećiragić, 8 Senad Begović, 9 Ilijas Masnić, 10 Mario Primorac, 11 Samir Avdić,
12 Emir Mutapčić, 13 Emir Halimić, 14 Sabahudin Bilalović (Coach: (Bosnia and Herzegovina) Mirza Delibašić; assistant Ibrahim Krehić)

1997 EuroBasket: finished 15th among 16 teams

4 Nenad Marković, 5 Gordan Firić, 6 Adis Bećiragić, 7 Samir Lerić, 8 Azur Korlatović, 9 Sejo Bukva, 10 Samir Selešković,
11 Samir Avdić, 12 Elvir Ovčina, 13 Dževad Alihodžić, 14 Adnan Hodžić, 15 Haris Mujezinović (Coach: (Bosnia and Herzegovina) Sabit Hadžić)

1999 EuroBasket: finished 15th among 16 teams

4 Nenad Marković, 5 Gordan Firić, 6 Adis Bećiragić, 7 Samir Lerić, 8 Ivan Opačak, 9 Jasmin Hukić, 10 Damir Mirković, 11 Tarik Valjevac, 12 Dževad Alihodžić, 13 Elvir Ovčina, 15 Haris Mujezinović (Coach: (Bosnia and Herzegovina) Sabit Hadžić)

2001 EuroBasket: finished 13th among 16 teams

4 Nenad Marković, 5 Gordan Firić, 6 Goran Terzić, 7 Samir Lerić, 8 Ivan Opačak, 9 Jasmin Hukić, 10 Siniša Kovačević, 11 Bariša Krasić, 12 Damir Mršić, 13 Ramiz Suljanović, 14 Elvir Ovčina, 15 Haris Mujezinović (Coach: (Bosnia and Herzegovina) Sabit Hadžić)

2003 EuroBasket: finished 15th among 16 teams

4 Terrel Castle, 5 Elvir Ovčina, 6 Damir Krupalija, 7 Samir Lerić, 8 Želimir Stevanović, 9 Jasmin Hukić, 10 Siniša Kovačević,
11 Bariša Krasić, 12 Damir Mršić, 13 Kenan Bajramović, 14 Mirza Teletović, 15 Haris Mujezinović (Coach: (Bosnia and Herzegovina) Draško Prodanović)

2005 EuroBasket: finished 15th among 16 teams

4 Vedran Princ, 5 Elvir Ovčina, 6 Mirza Teletović, 7 Samir Lerić, 8 Edin Bavčić, 9 Henry Domercant, 10 Siniša Kovačević,
11 Mujo Tuljković, 12 Damir Mršić, 13 Jasmin Hukić, 14 Aleksandar Radojević, 15 Kenan Bajramović (Coach: (Bosnia and Herzegovina) Mensur Bajramović)

2011 EuroBasket: finished 19th among 24 teams

4 Nemanja Gordić, 5 Aleksej Nešović, 6 Ermin Jazvin, 7 Goran Ikonić, 8 Milan Milošević, 9 Edin Bavčić, 10 Saša Vasiljević,
11 Elmedin Kikanović, 12 Mirza Teletović, 13 Henry Domercant, 14 Nihad Đedović, 15 Kenan Bajramović (Coach: (Bosnia and Herzegovina) Sabit Hadžić)

2013 EuroBasket: finished 12th among 24 teams

4 Muhamed Pašalić, 5 Ante Mašić, 6 Andrija Stipanović, 7 Marko Šutalo, 8 Zack Wright, 9 Edin Bavčić, 10 Nemanja Gordić,
11 Elmedin Kikanović, 12 Mirza Teletović, 13 Dalibor Peršić, 14 Nihad Đedović, 15 Nedžad Sinanović (Coach: (Croatia) Aleksandar Petrović)

2015 EuroBasket: finished 23rd among 24 teams

4 Muhamed Pašalić, 5 Nedim Buza, 6 Andrija Stipanović, 7 Marko Šutalo, 9 Edin Bavčić, 10 Nemanja Gordić, 11 Elmedin Kikanović (C), 13 Dalibor Peršić, 15 Milan Milošević, 20 Alex Renfroe, 23 Adin Vrabac, 30 Draško Albijanić (Coach: (Montenegro) Duško Ivanović)

2022 EuroBasket: finished 18th among 24 teams

0 Jusuf Nurkić, 2 John Roberson, 5 Edin Atić, 7 Miralem Halilović (C), 9 Amar Gegić, 11 Kenan Kamenjaš, 12 Sani Čampara,
13 Džanan Musa, 15 Ajdin Penava, 17 Aleksandar Lazić, 22 Emir Sulejmanović, 27 Adin Vrabac (Coach: (Bosnia and Herzegovina) Adis Bećiragić)

2025 EuroBasket: finished 13th among 24 teams

0 Jusuf Nurkić (C), 2 John Roberson, 3 Amar Alibegović, 4 Adnan Arslanagić, 7 Miralem Halilović, 9 Amar Gegić, 11 Ajdin Penava,
17 Aleksandar Lazić, 23 Tarik Hrelja, 27 Adin Vrabac, 34 Kenan Kamenjaš (Coach: (Bosnia and Herzegovina) Adis Bećiragić)

== Kit ==
Supplier	Period	Sponsor
(Serbia) NAAI	2015	
(Bosnia and Herzegovina) Haad	2015	BH Telecom
(Bosnia and Herzegovina) No1	2016–2021	Telemach, bh t
(Bosnia and Herzegovina) GB3	2021–present	Telemach, EPBiH

== See also ==
- Sport in Bosnia and Herzegovina
- Bosnia and Herzegovina women's national basketball team
- Bosnia and Herzegovina men's national under-20 basketball team
- Bosnia and Herzegovina men's national under-18 basketball team
- Bosnia and Herzegovina men's national under-16 and under-17 basketball team
