= Asim Gutić =

Bosnian basketball player

No. 10 – Bosna
- Position: Guard / Forward
- League: Bosnian League; ABA League

Personal information
- Born: 12 December 2001 (age 24) Tuzla, Bosnia and Herzegovina
- Listed height: 1.95 m (6 ft 5 in)
- Listed weight: 90 kg (198 lb)

Career information
- NBA draft: 2023: undrafted
- Playing career: 2022–present

Career history
- 2022–2024: OKK Sloboda Tuzla
- 2024–2026: KK Bosna BH Telecom
- 2026-: OKK Sloboda Tuzla

Career highlights
- ABA League 2 champion 2025; Bosnian Cup winner 2026; Bosnian League champion 2026

Asim Gutić (born 12 December 2001 in Tuzla, Bosnia and Herzegovina) is a Bosnian professional basketball player who plays as a guard/forward for OKK Sloboda Tuzla in the Bosnian League. He previously featured for KK Bosna BH Telecom in ABA League.

== Early career ==
Gutić came through the youth ranks of Sloboda Tuzla before making his senior debut. Over the 2022–23 season, he became a regular contributor in Bosnia’s top division, averaging 4.1 points and 0.7 rebounds per game in limited minutes.

=== KK Bosna (2024–present) ===
In July 2024 Gutić transferred to KK Bosna BH Telecom. During the 2024–25 season in the Bosnian Division I, he played 29 games, averaging 5.2 points, 1.5 rebounds, and 0.7 assists in about 13.3 minutes per game, while shooting 48.2% from three-point range.

In the ABA League Second Division, he logged 14 appearances with averages of 3.6 points and 1.0 rebounds, shooting over 51.7% on threes.

In June 2025, he signed a contract extension with Bosna. He previously featured for OKK Sloboda Tuzla. His shooting efficiency was 51.7% from beyond the arc in ABA 2 and 48.2% in the domestic league, which has been praised by the club.

== Player profile ==
Standing at 1.95m (6 ft 7in), Gutić serves as a wing player capable of playing both guard and forward roles. He is recognized for three-point shooting, defensive awareness, and calm under pressure—attributes that have made him a key rotational player.

He was also selected for the Bosnia and Herzegovina national team in 2025 qualifiers for EuroBasket.
