= Sani Čampara =

Bosnian basketball player

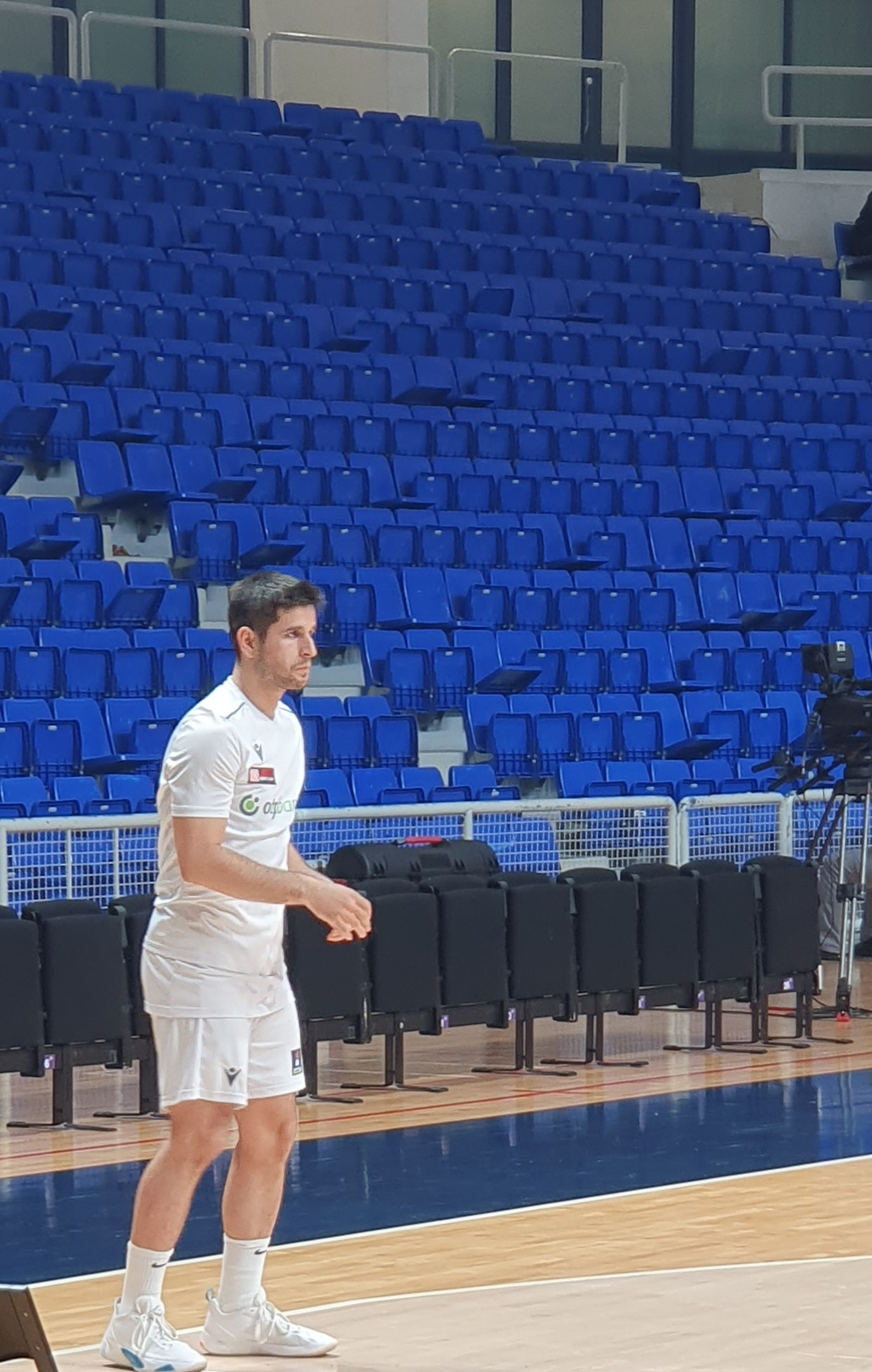
- Čampara warming up with KK Zadar in Podgorica in March 2023.

Sloboda Tuzla
- Position: Point guard
- League: Basketball Championship of Bosnia and Herzegovina

Personal information
- Born: March 3, 1999 (age 27) Sarajevo, Bosnia and Herzegovina
- Listed height: 190 cm (6 ft 3 in)

Career information
- NBA draft: 2021: undrafted
- Playing career: 2015–present

Career history
- 2015–2016: Spars
- 2016–2017: Real Madrid B
- 2017–2018: Palencia
- 2018–2019: Andorra B
- 2019: Andorra
- 2019–2020: Sloboda Tuzla
- 2020–2022: Split
- 2022–2023: Zadar
- 2023–2024: Belfius Mons-Hainaut
- 2024: Borac Banja Luka
- 2024–present: Sloboda Tuzla

Career highlights
- Croatian League champion (2023)
Medals
Men's basketball
Representing Bosnia and Herzegovina
FIBA Europe U16 Championship
Gold medal – first place	2015 Lithuania	National team

Sani Čampara (born March 3, 1999) is a Bosnian professional basketball player currently playing for Sloboda Tuzla of the Basketball Championship of Bosnia and Herzegovina. Standing at 1.90 m (6 ft 3 in), he plays at the point guard position. He also represents the Bosnia and Herzegovina national team internationally.
