= Gordan Firić =

Bosnian basketball coach (born 1970)

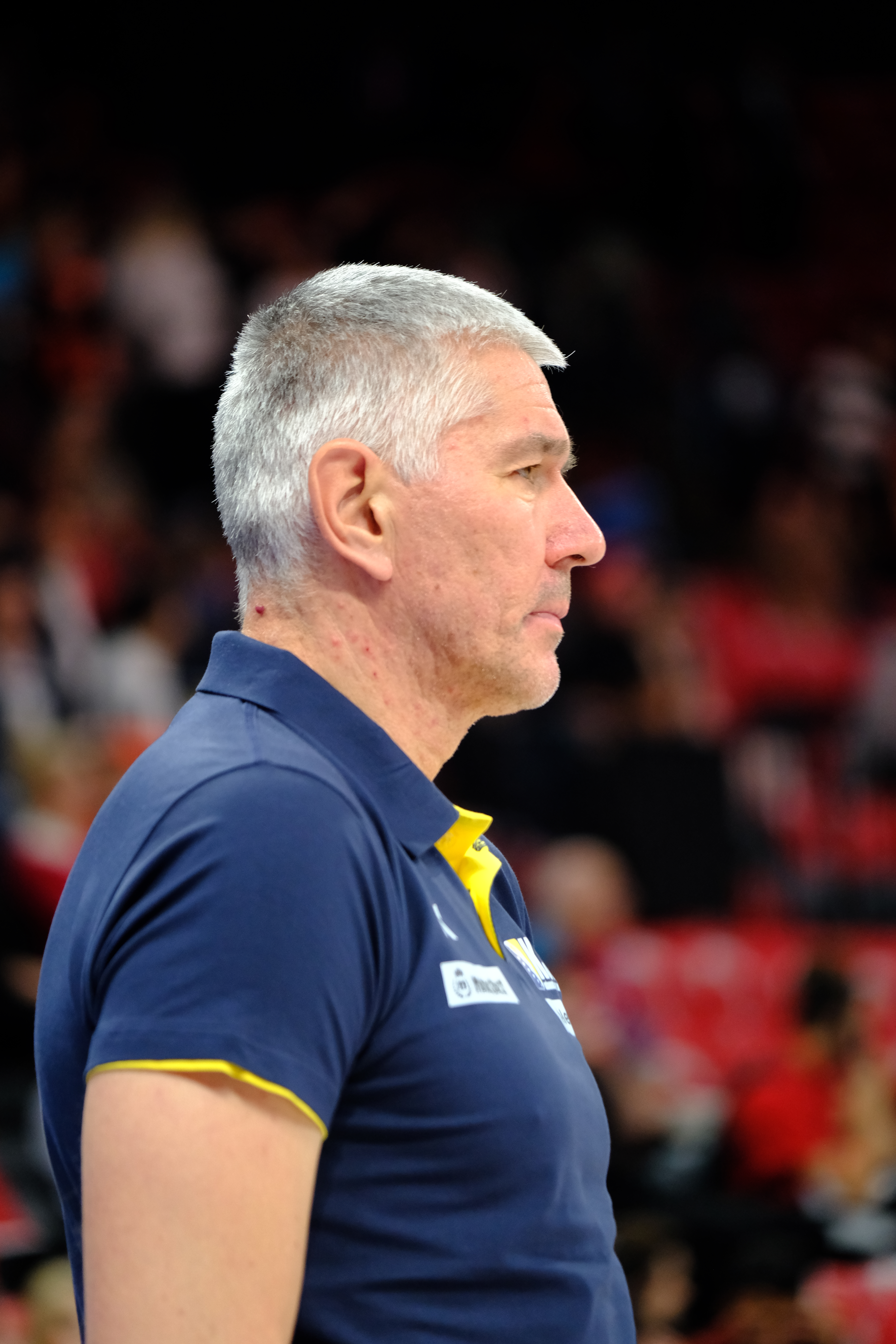
- Firić in 2025

Personal information
- Born: 1 September 1970 (age 56) Vareš, SR Bosnia and Herzegovina, SFR Yugoslavia

Career information
- Playing career: 1989–2007
- Position: Shooting guard
- Coaching career: 2008–present

Career history

Playing
- 1989–1993: Bosna
- 1993: Napoli Basket
- 1993–1994: Oyak Renault
- 1994–1995: Auxilium Torino
- 1995: Basket Modena
- 1997: Pallacanestro Trieste
- 1998–2000: Aurora Jesi
- 2000–2001: Aris Thessaloniki
- 2001: ASVEL Lyon-Villeurbanne
- 2001–2004: SG Braunschweig
- 2004: Aurora Jesi
- 2004–2006: SG Braunschweig
- 2006: Hérens Sion
- 2006: Porvoon Tarmo
- 2007: Vevey Riviera
- 2007: Bosna

Coaching
- 2008–2014: Basket Rimini Crabs (youth)
- 2014–: Basket Rimini Crabs (assistant)
- 2022–: Bosnia and Herzegovina (assistant)

Gordan Firić (born 1 September 1970) is a Bosnian former professional basketball player. He played as a shooting guard and was also a member of the Bosnia and Herzegovina national basketball team. He is currently an assistant coach for the Bosnian national team.

== Playing career ==
Firić played pickup basketball in Jajce, where basketball was played primarily on outdoor concrete courts. In 1985 or 1986 he moved joined Bosna. His transfer to the Sarajevo club was facilitated by prominent figures of Bosna, including Mirza Delibašić, Mirsad Milavić and Zijah Kadić. Firić began his professional career with Bosna in 1989, where he remained until 1993.

From 1993 to 2000 he played in Italy for five different clubs: Basket Napoli, Auxilium Torino, Basket Modena, Pallacanestro Trieste, and Aurora Jesi. Over seven seasons in Italy, he appeared in 129 games, averaging 17 points, 4.8 rebounds, 2 steals, and 1.9 assists per game.

In the 2000–01 season he joined Aris Thessaloniki in Greece, playing 23 games with averages of 7.8 points, 4.2 rebounds, and 3.8 assists. Later that season he moved to ASVEL Villeurbanne in France.

Firić then signed with SG Braunschweig in Germany, where he spent five years and played in 104 league games. During his spell in Germany he also had a brief return to Aurora Jesi on loan in 2004, appearing in four games.

Toward the end of his career, he played in Switzerland with Hérens Basket (Sion) and Riviera Lakers (Vevey), as well as in Finland with Tarmo Porvoo. He retired in 2007 with his original club, KK Bosna.

== National team career ==
Between 1993 and 2007, Firić made 63 appearances for the Bosnia and Herzegovina men's national basketball team, scoring a total of 639 points. At the time of his retirement he ranked as the team's second all-time leading scorer, behind Nenad Marković.

== Coaching career ==
Firić began his coaching career in 2008 with Basket Rimini Crabs, working with the club's youth teams until 2014, when he was promoted to assistant coach of the senior team. Despite his involvement with the first team, he remained active in the youth sector, serving as head coach of both the U-20 and U-14 squads.

In 2012, he also served as head coach of the Bosnia and Herzegovina U-16 national team.

As of 2025, he serves as assistant coach of Bosnia and Herzegovina national basketball team from 2022.
