= Xavier Castañeda =

American-Bosnian basketball player (born 2000)

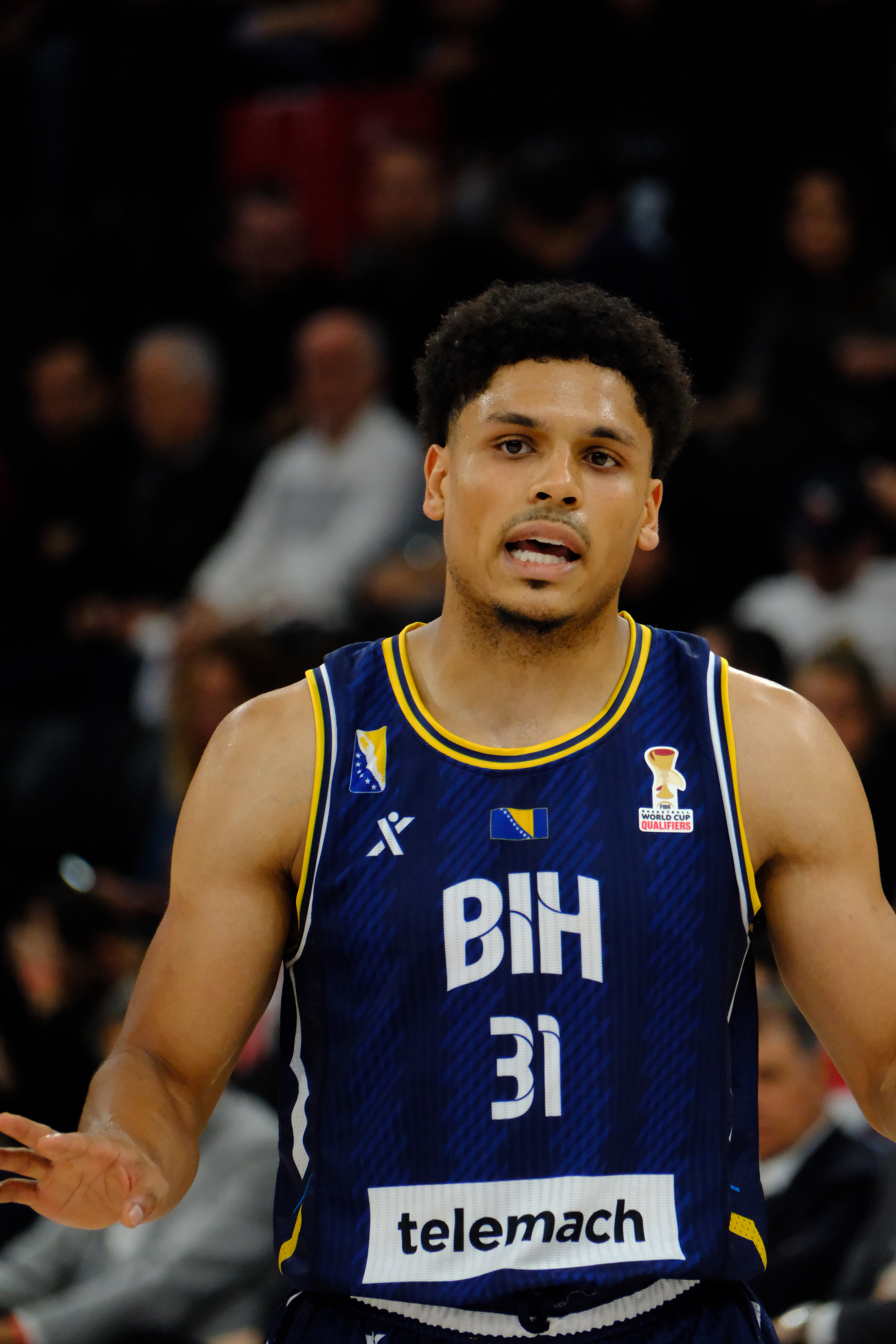
- Castañeda with Bosnia and Herzegovina in 2025

No. 13 – Nanterre 92
- Position: Point guard / shooting guard
- League: LNB Élite; Champions League

Personal information
- Born: March 26, 2000 (age 26) Chicago, Illinois, U.S.
- Listed height: 1.84 m (6 ft 0 in)
- Listed weight: 85 kg (187 lb)

Career information
- College: South Florida (2018–2021); Akron (2021–2023)
- NBA draft: 2023: undrafted
- Playing career: 2023–present

Career history
- 2023–2024: Lavrio
- 2024–2025: JL Bourg
- 2025–2026: Unicaja
- 2026: →Andorra
- 2026–present: Nanterre 92

Career highlights
- LNB All-Star (2024); First-team All-MAC (2023)

Xavier Misael Castañeda (born March 26, 2000), sometimes spelled Castaneda, is an American-born naturalized Bosnian professional basketball player for Nanterre 92 of the LNB Élite and the Champions League. Standing 1.84 meters (6 feet) tall, he plays as a point guard and shooting guard.

== College career ==
Castañeda played three seasons with the South Florida Bulls, where he averaged 5.5 points, 2.0 rebounds, and 1.9 assists per game. On March 18, 2021, he entered the NCAA transfer portal and joined the Akron Zips in May. He played two more seasons at Akron, averaging 17.5 points, 4.0 rebounds, and 2.6 assists per game. In his final season, he averaged 21.7 points and 4.3 rebounds per game and was named to the All-MAC First Team. He led the conference in scoring, triple-doubles, and three-point percentage (39.0%).

== Professional career ==
After going undrafted in the 2023 NBA draft, Castañeda joined the Los Angeles Clippers for the NBA Summer League. He signed his first professional contract with Lavrio of the Greek Basketball League, where he averaged 15.1 points, 3.3 rebounds, and 2.5 assists in 24.4 minutes per game.

On June 1, 2024, he signed with JL Bourg Basket of the French LNB Élite. In November 2024, he was selected to participate in the LNB All-Star Game.

On June 21, 2025, he signed with Unicaja of the Spanish Liga ACB. On December 22, 2025, he was loaned out to Hiopos Lleida, also in the Liga ACB. However, the loan would later be cancelled as Castañeda failed the medical exam at his new team. On January 2, 2026, MoraBanc Andorra of the Liga ACB announced Castañeda would join the team on loan until the end of the season.

On July 13, 2026, he signed with Nanterre 92 of the LNB Pro A.

== National team career ==
In November 2024, Castañeda obtained Bosnian nationality. Shortly after, he was called up to play for the Bosnia and Herzegovina men's national basketball team, making his debut in a match against France.
