= Dalibor Peršić =

Bosnian-Croatian basketball player

HKK Široki
- Position: Shooting guard
- League: Basketball Championship of Bosnia and Herzegovina

Personal information
- Born: May 28, 1985 (age 41) Tuzla, SR Bosnia-Herzegovina, SFR Yugoslavia
- Listed height: 6 ft 4 in (1.93 m)
- Listed weight: 223 lb (101 kg)

Career information
- NBA draft: 2007: undrafted
- Playing career: 2003–present

Career history
- 2003–2010: Sloboda Tuzla
- 2010–2013: HKK Široki
- 2013: Jolly Jadranska Banka
- 2014: Sloboda Tuzla
- 2014: HKK Široki
- 2014–2015: BC Timișoara
- 2015–2017: OKK Spars Sarajevo
- 2017–present: HKK Široki

Dalibor Peršić (born May 28, 1985) is a Bosnian-Croatian professional basketball player who plays for HKK Široki of the Basketball Championship of Bosnia and Herzegovina.
