= Sabit Hadžić =

Bosnian basketball player and coach (1957–2018)

Personal information
- Born: 7 August 1957 Sarajevo, PR Bosnia and Herzegovina, FPR Yugoslavia
- Died: 3 March 2018 (aged 60) Antalya, Turkey
- Position: Head coach

Career history

Playing
- 1977–1984: Bosna

Coaching
- 1995–2001: Bosnia and Herzegovina
- 1998–2000: Bosna
- 2001–2002: Mitteldeutscher BC
- 2003–2004: Al-Ittihad Jeddah
- 2005: KB Peja
- 2005–2006: Al Jalaa Aleppo
- 2007–2008: Kepez Belediyesi S.K.
- 2010–2011: Bosnia and Herzegovina
- 2012–2013: Al-Ittihad Jeddah
- 2014: Sigal Prishtina
- 2015–2017: Al-Jahra

Career highlights
- As player: EuroLeague champion (1979); 3× Yugoslav League champion (1978, 1980, 1983); 2× Yugoslav Cup winner (1978, 1984); As head coach: Bosnian League champion (1999); Saudi Premier League champion (2013)
Medals
Men's basketball
Representing Yugoslavia
Bronze medal – third place	1984 Los Angeles	Team competition

Sabit Hadžić (7 August 1957 – 3 March 2018) was a Bosnian basketball player who competed for Yugoslavia in the 1984 Summer Olympics. He also worked as a basketball coach.

== Personal life ==
Hadžić suffered a stroke on 13 February 2018 in Antalya. He was immediately hospitalized, placed in induced coma and kept in intensive care.

Weeks later, on 3 March 2018, he died, aged 60.
