= Samir Lerić =

Bosnian basketball player

Personal information
- Born: September 12, 1973 (age 53) Mostar, SR Bosnia and Herzegovina, SFR Yugoslavia
- Listed height: 2.06 m (6 ft 9 in)
- Position: Center

Samir Lerić (born 12 September 1973) is a Bosnian former professional basketball player. He played as a center and was a long-time member of the Bosnia and Herzegovina men's national basketball team.

== Playing career ==
Lerić made his senior debut in the early 1990s and went on to become one of the most capped players in the history of the Bosnia and Herzegovina men's national basketball team. He represented Bosnia and Herzegovina at five consecutive EuroBasket tournaments during the 1990s and 2000s. He began his career with Lokomotiva Mostar before continuing abroad. With Bosna Sarajevo, he won the national championship in 1999, and with Sloboda Tuzla he captured the Bosnian Cup in 2001. He also played for Polonia Warsaw and Zlatorog Laško.

== Later life ==
After retiring from professional basketball, Lerić remained involved in the sport through youth coaching and local clubs such as OKK Student Mostar.

Due to the suspension of domestic competitions during the COVID-19 pandemic and a lack of professional opportunities, he worked delivering bakery products in Mostar. Lerić stated that it was an honest job and that he felt no shame in doing it.

In August 2021, Lerić was seriously injured in a traffic accident in Mostar when he was struck by a car, suffering a double leg fracture that required surgery.

== Legacy ==
Lerić is remembered as one of Bosnia and Herzegovina’s most consistent national team players, with over 100 appearances, and a key figure in the country’s early international basketball history.
