= Dževad Alihodžić =

Bosnian basketball player

Personal information
- Born: February 13, 1969 (age 57) Zenica, SFR Yugoslavia
- Listed height: 2.08 m (6 ft 10 in)

Career information
- Playing career: 1983–2003
- Position: Center

Career history
- 1983–1984: Čelik Zenica
- 1984–1990: Bosna Sarajevo
- 1990–1992: Cibona Zagreb
- 1992–1993: Olimpija Osijek
- 1993–1998: Cibona Zagreb
- 1998–1999: Ülker Istanbul
- 1999–2000: Cibona Zagreb
- 2000–2001: St. Petersburg Lions
- 2001–2002: Strasbourg IG
- 2001: Scafati Basket
- 2002–2003: Cibona Zagreb

Dževad Alihodžić (born 13 February 1969) is a former Yugoslav and Bosnian professional basketball player.

He began his career with Čelik Zenica, and after impressive performances with the junior team in 1983, he joined Bosna Sarajevo, where he played until 1990. He then moved to Cibona Zagreb, where he spent seven seasons, winning six Croatian League titles and two national Cups.

During his international career, Alihodžić played for Ülkerspor in Istanbul (1998–99), the St. Petersburg Lions in Russia, Strasbourg IG in France, and Scafati Basket in Italy. He returned to Cibona for the 2002–03 season, having played the previous year with Zagreb.

Alihodžić achieved his most significant success with the Yugoslavia national basketball team, winning the FIBA U16 European Championship in 1985 where he was named the best center, earning a place in the tournament's All-Star Five. In the final, he scored 23 points against Italy, and averaged 18.7 points per game throughout the competition, finishing as Yugoslavia's second-leading scorer behind Arijan Komazec.

After retiring from playing, he remained active in basketball as a coach. He served as an assistant coach for the Bosnia and Herzegovina men's national basketball team under head coach Damir Mulaomerović. He later continued his coaching career in Dubai, where he trains boys at a basketball academy called Basicball.

In 2024 he was appointed acting Secretary General of the Basketball Federation of Bosnia and Herzegovina.
