= Ivan Opačak =

Bosnian basketball coach

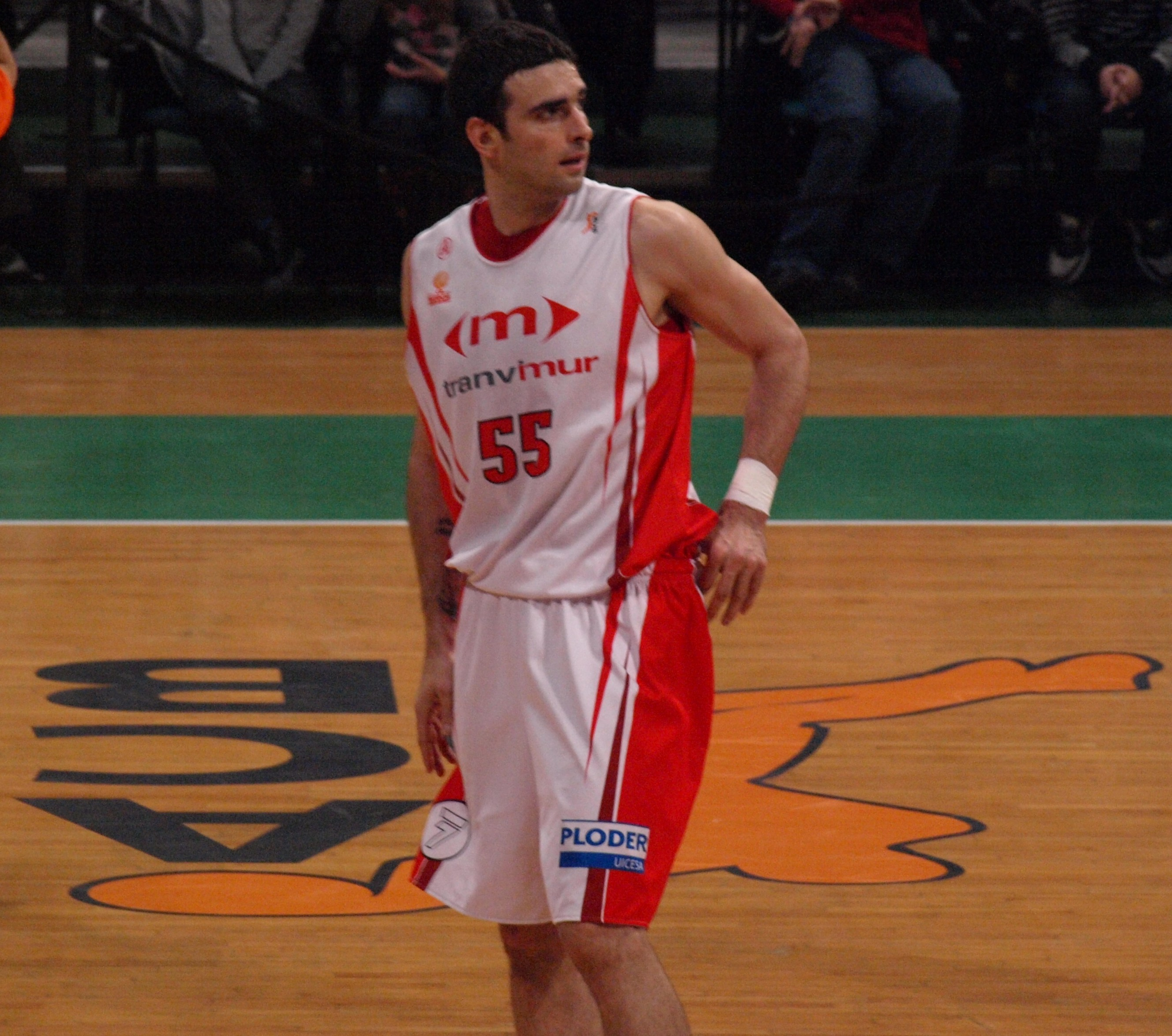
- Opačak with CB Murcia in January 2009.

Personal information
- Born: April 23, 1980 (age 46) Zenica, SR Bosnia and Herzegovina; SFR Yugoslavia
- Listed height: 6 ft 7 in (2.01 m)
- Listed weight: 220 lb (100 kg)

Career information
- Playing career: 1998–2015
- Position: Small forward
- Coaching career: 2015–present

Career history

Playing
- 1997–1999: Čelik Zenica
- 1999–2000: SAV Vacallo Basket
- 2000–2002: Čelik Zenica
- 2002–2003: Široki
- 2003–2004: Virtus Ragusa
- 2004: Čelik Zenica
- 2004–2005: NIS Vojvodina
- 2005–2007: Široki
- 2007–2009: Murcia
- 2009–2010: Cedevita
- 2010–2011: Čelik Zenica
- 2011: Križevci
- 2011–2012: Cedevita
- 2012–2013: Turów Zgorzelec
- 2013: Čelik Zenica
- 2013–2014: Široki
- 2014–2015: Čelik Zenica
- 2015: OKK Spars Sarajevo

Coaching
- 2015–2018: OKK Spars Sarajevo (assistant)
- 2018: OKK Spars Sarajevo

Career highlights
- 2× Bosnian League champion (2003, 2007); Bosnian Cup winner (2006, 2014); Croatian Cup winner (2012)

Ivan Opačak (born 23 April 1980) is a Bosnian professional basketball coach and former player.

Opačak played for HKK Široki of the Adriatic League and Bosnian League. He previously played for Turów Zgorzelec.

Opačak was member of the Bosnia and Herzegovina national basketball team at EuroBasket in 1999 and 2001.
