= Nenad Marković =

Bosnian basketball player and coach (born 1968)

Karşıyaka Basket
- Title: Head coach
- League: Basketbol Süper Ligi

Personal information
- Born: 6 June 1968 (age 58) Doboj, SR Bosnia and Herzegovina, SFR Yugoslavia
- Listed height: 1.96 m (6 ft 5 in)

Career information
- NBA draft: 1990: undrafted
- Playing career: 1988–2006
- Position: Shooting guard
- Number: 4

Career history

Playing
- 1988–1992: Bosna
- 1992–1993: Stefanel Trieste
- 1993: CB Llíria
- 1993–1994: Hapoel Tel Aviv
- 1994–1995: Joventut Badalona
- 1995: Lugano Tigers
- 1995–1996: Hapoel Tel Aviv
- 1996: Hapoel Eilat
- 1996–1999: Limoges CSP
- 1999–2000: Pamesa Valencia
- 2000–2001: Adecco Estudiantes
- 2001–2002: Panionios
- 2002–2003: Olympiacos
- 2003: Polaris World Murcia
- 2003–2004: Panionios
- 2004–2006: Bosna

Coaching
- 2007: Bosna
- 2007–2008, 2009-2010: Panionios
- 2013–2014: KAOD
- 2014–2016: Trabzonspor
- 2016–2017: Pınar Karşıyaka
- 2017: Tenerife
- 2017–2021: Gaziantep
- 2021–2023: JDA Dijon
- 2024–2025: Dinamo Sassari
- 2025: Bursaspor
- 2025–2026: Panionios
- 2026–present: Karşıyaka Basket

Career highlights
- As player: Bosnian Cup winner (2005); 2× LNB All-Star Game (1998–1999); As head coach: FIBA Intercontinental Cup champion (2017)

Nenad Marković (born 6 June 1968) is a Bosnian professional basketball coach and former player who played at the shooting guard position. He is currently the head coach for Karşıyaka Basket of the Basketbol Süper Ligi (BSL).

== Early life and career ==
Born in Doboj to a Bosnian Serb father and a Bosnian Croat mother, Marković began playing organized basketball at KK Igman, based out of the Sarajevo suburb of Ilidža. At age 15, simultaneously with starting high school, after appearing with Igman at a basketball camp in Zaostrog where he caught the eye of KK Bosna's representatives, the teenager transferred to the more established Sarajevo club that placed him in their youth system under coach Mladen "Makso" Ostojić.

Marković played for a number of years in KK Bosna's youth teams alongside players such as Predrag Danilović, Dževad Alihodžić, Senad Begović, Adis Bećiragić, etc.

== Club career ==
Marković (left) with Bosna in October 2006

Marković broke into Bosna's first team and became a regular starter during the 1989–90 season. At that season's end his improvement was recognized with a call-up to the Yugoslav national team under famous coach Dušan "Duda" Ivković. However, Marković was not ultimately selected for the FIBA World Championship side sent to Argentina in August 1990, which Yugoslavia won. Marković nonetheless continued to improve at the club level, featuring regularly for KK Bosna over the next two seasons, before the war broke out in his native Bosnia and Herzegovina.

For the next 14 seasons Marković played all over Europe, including in Italy, Spain, Israel, France, and Greece. In France, while playing for Limoges, he had the honour of playing in the French league All-Star game, during which he won the three-point shootout competition. He also played in many notable matches for the new Bosnian national team, including in two matches against Croatia in November 1997 and November 1998 that helped make his name as one of Bosnia's most prominent athletes. before eventually returning to KK Bosna to end his playing career.

Eventually, in 2004, Marković returned to KK Bosna to end his playing career, becoming the first Bosnian basketball player to return to his hometown club in this way. He retired from the game in 2006, having played for 18 years.

== Coaching career ==
Following retirement, Marković worked as a coach for the Bosnia and Herzegovina national basketball team. He became head coach of KK Bosna in 2007, but resigned on failing to achieve his announced goal of leading them to the national championship title.

In October 2007, Marković became the head coach of Greek club Panionios, whom he led to qualification for the EuroLeague, a goal the club had not achieved in the previous 12 seasons. His contract, however, was not renewed, and he was replaced in summer 2008 for the following 2008–09 season by Aleksandar Trifunović.

End of July 2009, Marković again has become head coach of Greek club Panionios Athens.

In early February 2013, Marković took the reins of Greek club KAOD from the town of Drama fighting for survival in the Greek League. Marković took over from Georgios Kalafatakis, who left the team after 15 league matches in 12th league spot (out of 14) with the 5-10 record.

On 24 November 2014 he signed with Trabzonspor of the Basketbol Süper Ligi (BSL).

On 5 July 2016 he signed with Pınar Karşıyaka of the Basketbol Süper Ligi (BSL).

On 21 June 2017 he signed with Tenerife of the Liga ACB. He won the FIBA Intercontinental Cup championship in 2017.

On 28 November 2017 he signed with Gaziantep of the Basketbol Süper Ligi (BSL).

On 10 June 2021, he signed with JDA Dijon of French LNB Pro A.

On 24 January 2024, he signed with Dinamo Sassari in the Italian Lega Basket Serie A (LBA).

On 1 August 2025, he signed with Bursaspor Basketbol of the Basketbol Süper Ligi (BSL).

On 29 July 2026, he signed with Karşıyaka Basket of the Basketbol Süper Ligi (BSL) for a second stint after 10 years.

== Achievements ==
=== As player ===
- Bosna: (1)
  - Bosnian Cup: (2005)

=== As coach ===
- Tenerife: (1)
  - FIBA Intercontinental Cup: (2017)

== Political career ==
Marković joined the Social Democratic Party (SDP BiH) in Bosnia and Herzegovina.

On 29 January 2009, he was appointed deputy mayor of Bosnia-Herzegovina's capital Sarajevo, working under mayor Alija Behmen, also a member of the SDP BiH.

In July 2009, Marković went back to coaching with a job at Panionios. For a few months, he continued with the deputy mayoral job in parallel, but in November 2009 handed in his resignation, which was accepted by the Sarajevo city council.
