= Jure Zubac =

Bosnian basketball player (born 1995)

No. 31 – Bosna
- Position: Power forward
- League: Bosnian League; ABA League

Personal information
- Born: 15 March 1995 (age 31) Mostar, Bosnia and Herzegovina
- Listed height: 2.03 m (6 ft 8 in)

Career information
- NBA draft: 2017: undrafted
- Playing career: 2011–present

Career history
- 2011–2014: HKK Brotnjo
- 2014–2021: HKK Široki
- 2021–2022: BK Inter Bratislava
- 2022–2023: Belfius Mons-Hainaut
- 2023–: KK Bosna BH Telecom

Career highlights
- Alpe Adria Cup MVP (2021–22); ABA League 2 champion (2024–25)

Jure Zubac (born 15 March 1995 in Mostar, Bosnia and Herzegovina) is a Bosnian professional basketball player who plays as a power forward for KK Bosna BH Telecom in the Bosnian League and ABA League.

== Career ==
He began his professional career in 2011 with HKK Brotnjo.

=== HKK Široki ===
He joined HKK Široki in 2014, where he played regularly in both the domestic league and regional competitions. Over this period, he gradually developed into a key contributor with consistent performances.

=== Inter Bratislava ===
In the 2021–22 season Zubac was signed by BK Inter Bratislava in the Slovak League. That season he was named MVP of the Alpe Adria Cup.

=== Belfius Mons-Hainaut (2022–2023) ===
In the 2022–23 season, Zubac moved to Belgium's BNXT League with Belfius Mons-Hainaut, averaging approximately 10.3 points and 5.5 rebounds per game and earning recognition for his efficient shooting and rebounding.

=== KK Bosna BH Telecom (2023–present) ===
Since joining Bosna in 2023, Zubac has been a consistent starter, playing 29 games in the 2024–25 Bosnian Division I, averaging 8.6 points, 4.1 rebounds per game, and shooting 57.6% from the field. In ABA League 2, he posted 6.0 points and 4.6 rebounds per game across 17 matches. He was a member of the team that won the ABA League Second Division in the 2024–25 season.

He has also represented Bosnia and Herzegovina at the senior level in FIBA EuroBasket qualifiers.

== Profile ==
At 2.03 m (6 ft 8 in), Zubac plays primarily at power forward, known for his work-rate, rebounding, efficient shooting inside the arc, and steady presence on both ends. His field goal percentage has regularly exceeded 55% at various levels.
