= Siniša Kovačević (basketball) =

Bosnian basketball player

- Kovačević in 2026

Igokea m:tel
- Title: Team manager
- League: Bosnian League; ABA League

Personal information
- Born: May 11, 1978 (age 48) Banja Luka, SR Bosnia and Herzegovina, SFR Yugoslavia
- Listed height: 2.00 m (6 ft 7 in)

Career information
- NBA draft: 2000: undrafted
- Playing career: 1996–2012
- Position: Small forward
- Number: 10, 13, 14

Career history
- 1996–1997: Crvena zvezda
- 1999–2002: Igokea
- 2002–2003: Budućnost
- 2003–2006: Bosna ASA
- 2006–2007: Vojvodina Srbijagas
- 2007: Igokea
- 2008: Bosna Royal
- 2010–2012: Borac Banja Luka
Medals
Men's basketball
Representing FR Yugoslavia
U18 European Championship
Bronze medal – third place	1996 France	U18 National Team

Siniša Kovačević (Serbian Cyrillic: Синиша Ковачевић; born May 11, 1978) is a Bosnian Serb former professional basketball player. He currently serves as a team manager for Igokea m:tel of the Bosnian League and the ABA League.

== Playing career ==
Kovačević played for Crvena zvezda and Budućnost of the FR Yugoslavia League, for Vojvodina Srbijagas of the Basketball League of Serbia and for Igokea, Bosna Royal and Borac Banja Luka of the Basketball Championship of Bosnia and Herzegovina.

== International career ==
Kovačević was a member of the FR Yugoslavia U-18 national basketball team that won the bronze medal at the 1996 FIBA Europe Under-18 Championship. Over seven tournament games, he averaged 8.4 points, 2.7 rebounds and 1.9 assists per game.

Kovačević was a member of the Bosnia and Herzegovina national basketball team and competed at three EuroBasket tournaments (2001 in Turkey, 2003 in Sweden, 2005 in Serbia and Montenegro).

== Post–playing career ==
In May 2016, Kovačević was named a director for men's selections of the Bosnia and Herzegovina national basketball team. Also, he was a sports director of KK Student Banja Luka.

== Career achievements ==
- Championship of Bosnia and Herzegovina champion: 1 (with Igokea: 2000–01)
- Basketball Cup of Bosnia and Herzegovina winner: 1 (with Bosna: 2004–05)
