= Shahar Gordon =

Israeli basketball player

Shahar Gordon שחר גורדון
Personal information
- Born: June 7, 1980 (age 46) Ramat Gan, Israel
- Listed height: 6 ft 10 in (2.08 m)

Career information
- College: California
- Position: Forward/center

Shahar Gordon (Hebrew: שחר גורדון; born June 7, 1980) is an Israeli former basketball player. He played the forward and center positions. He played in the Israeli Basketball Premier League, and for the Israeli national basketball team.

== Biography ==
Gordon was born in Ramat Gan, Israel, and is Jewish. His parents are Zeev (an attorney) and Claire Gordon (an educational researcher at the Open University of Israel). He is 6 ft 10 in (208 cm) tall.

He attended St. Thomas More School in Oakdale, Connecticut. As a senior Gordon averaged 13 points and eight rebounds per game, and received the school's Scholar-Athlete Award.

Gordon attended the University of California, Berkeley ('00). He played for the California Golden Bears from 1998 to 2000. He left to return to Israel to serve in the Israel Defense Forces.

He played in the Israeli Basketball Premier League. He played in Israel for Ironi Ramat Gan, Hapoel Jerusalem, Maccabi Rishon LeZion, Givat Shmuel-Petach Tikva, and Ramat Hasharon.

Gordon played for the Israeli national basketball team in the 1995 FIBA European Championship for Cadets, 1998 FIBA U18 Euro Championship (and was the team captain), 2000 European Championship for Young Men, 2001 World Championship for Young Men, 2001 European Championship for Men, 2003 European Championship for Men, and 2006 EuroCup.
