= Jasmin Hukić =

Bosnian basketball player

Personal information
- Born: 15 August 1979 (age 47) Tuzla, SR Bosnia and Herzegovina, Yugoslavia
- Listed height: 2.04 m (6 ft 8 in)
- Listed weight: 104 kg (229 lb)

Career information
- NBA draft: 2001: undrafted
- Playing career: 1996–2018
- Position: Small forward / power forward

Career history
- 1996–2001: Sloboda Dita
- 2001–2003: Union Olimpija
- 2003–2004: Hapoel Tel Aviv
- 2004–2005: Hemofarm
- 2005–2006: Ural Great
- 2006–2007: Prokom Trelf Sopot
- 2007–2009: Union Olimpija
- 2009–2010: Benetton Treviso
- 2010–2011: Donetsk
- 2011–2012: Enisey Krasnoyarsk
- 2012: Novipiù Casale Monferrato
- 2012–2013: Petrochimi Bandar Imam
- 2013–2015: Krka
- 2015–2016: Cibona
- 2016–2018: Ilirija

Career highlights
- FIBA EuroCup Challenge champion (2006); 2× Adriatic League champion (2002, 2005); 5× Slovenian League champion (2002, 2008, 2009, 2013, 2014); Polish League champion (2007); 6× Slovenian Cup winner (2002, 2003, 2008, 2009, 2014, 2015); Slovenian Supercup winner (2014); 2× Slovenian Cup MVP (2008, 2009)

Jasmin Hukić (born 15 August 1979) is a Bosnian retired professional basketball player who last played for Ilirija of the Slovenian League. He also represented the Bosnia and Herzegovina national basketball team. Standing at 2.04 m (6 ft 8 1/2 in), he plays at the small forward and power forward positions.

== Professional career ==
Hukić began his playing career with the youth teams of Sloboda Dita in Bosnia and Herzegovina. He made his professional debut with Sloboda during the 1996–97 season. In 2001, he moved to Slovenian club Union Olimpija. In two years with Olimpija he won the first season of the Adriatic League. He was also a Slovenian League champion in 2002 and Slovenian Cup winner in 2002 and 2003. For the 2003–04 season he moved to Israeli club Hapoel Tel Aviv. In the 2004–05 season he played in Serbia with Hemofarm and won the Adriatic League. In the 2005–06 season he played with Russian club Ural Great and won the FIBA EuroCup Challenge. In the 2006–07 season he played with Polish club Prokom Trelf Sopot and won the Polish League championship. From 2007 to 2009 he played once again with Slovenian club Union Olimpija. In his second stint with Olimpija he won two more Slovenian championships and Slovenian Cups.

In the 2009–10 season he played with Italian club Benetton Treviso. In the 2010–11 season he played with Ukrainian club Donetsk. The 2011–12 season he started with Russian club Enisey Krasnoyarsk but in January 2012 he moved to Italian club Novipiù Casale Monferrato for the rest of the season. In December 2012, he signed with Iranian club Petrochimi Bandar Imam for the rest of the 2012–13 season. In June 2013, he signed with Slovenian club Krka. In his two-year stint with Krka he was a two time Slovenian League champion and Slovenian Cup winner. For the 2015–16 season he signed with Croatian club Cibona. From 2016, he plays in Slovenian club Ilirija.

== National team career ==
He played with the senior Bosnia and Herzegovina national basketball team at the EuroBasket 1999, EuroBasket 2001, EuroBasket 2003 and EuroBasket 2005.
