= Elvir Ovčina =

Bosnian basketball player (born 1976)

Personal information
- Born: July 16, 1976 (age 50) Sarajevo, SR Bosnia and Herzegovina, SFR Yugoslavia
- Listed height: 2.11 m (6 ft 11 in)
- Listed weight: 118 kg (260 lb)

Career information
- High school: Sycamore (Sycamore, Illinois)
- College: Syracuse (1995–1999)
- NBA draft: 1999: undrafted
- Playing career: 1999–2013
- Position: Center
- Number: 5, 10

Career history
- 1999–2000: Hopsi Polzela
- 2000–2001: Pivovarlna Laško
- 2001–2004: EWE Baskets Oldenburg
- 2004: Olympiacos
- 2004–2005: RheinEnergie Köln
- 2005: Khimik
- 2005–2008: Oostende
- 2009: Bosna
- 2009: Hopsi Polzela
- 2010–2013: Gießen 46ers

Career highlights
- 2× Belgian League champion (2006, 2007); Belgian Cup winner (2008); German Cup winner (2005); Bosnian Cup winner (2009)

Elvir Ovčina (born July 16, 1976) is a Bosnian former professional basketball player. He played the center position.

== College career ==
Ovčina played high school basketball at Sycamore High School in Sycamore, Illinois. After high school, he played college basketball at the Syracuse University, with the Syracuse Orange men's basketball team from 1995 to 1999.

== Professional career ==
Ovčina played professionally in Slovenia (Hopsi Polzela, Pivovarlna Laško), Germany (EWE Baskets Oldenburg, RheinEnergie Köln, Gießen 46ers), Greece (Olympiacos), Ukraine (Khimik), Belgium (Oostende) and Bosnia and Herzegovina (Bosna).

== National team career ==
Ovčina played for the national basketball team of Bosnia and Herzegovina. He has played at the EuroBasket 1997, EuroBasket 1999, EuroBasket 2001, EuroBasket 2003 and EuroBasket 2005.
