= Haris Mujezinović =

Bosnian basketball player

Personal information
- Born: 21 January 1974 (age 52) Visoko, SR Bosnia and Herzegovina, SFR Yugoslavia
- Listed height: 2.05 m (6 ft 9 in)
- Listed weight: 107 kg (236 lb)

Career information
- High school: Amundsen (Chicago, Illinois)
- College: Joliet JC (1993–1995); Indiana (1995–1997)
- NBA draft: 1997: undrafted
- Playing career: 1997–2010
- Position: Power forward
- Number: 12, 15

Career history
- 1997–1998: Šibenik
- 1998–1999: Libertas Forlì
- 1999–2000: SAV Vacallo Basket
- 2000: Kombassan Konya
- 2000–2001: Galatasaray
- 2001–2002: Union Olimpija
- 2002–2003: Cibona
- 2003: Dynamo Moscow
- 2003-2004: Panathinaikos
- 2004: Fortitudo Bologna
- 2004–2006: Lietuvos rytas
- 2006–2007: Valencia
- 2007: Kyiv
- 2007–2008: Panionios
- 2008: Lukoil Akademik
- 2008: Benetton Treviso
- 2008–2009: AEL Limassol
- 2009: Al Ahli Dubai
- 2009–2010: Darüşşafaka

Career highlights
- ULEB Cup champion (2005); Lithuanian League champion (2006); Baltic League champion (2006); Adriatic League champion (2002); Slovenian Cup winner (2002)

Haris Mujezinović (born 21 January 1974) is a Bosnian former professional basketball player. He played at the power forward position.

== College career ==
Mujezinović played high school basketball at Amundsen High School in Chicago, Illinois. After high school, he played college basketball at the Joliet Junior College from 1993 to 1995. He then transferred to Indiana University Bloomington, where he was a member of the Indiana Hoosiers, from 1995 to 1997.

== Professional career ==
Mujezinović played professionally in Croatia (Šibenik, Cibona), Italy (Libertas Forli, Fortitudo Bologna, Benetton Treviso), Turkey (Kombassan Konya, Galatasaray, Darüşşafaka), Greece (Panathinaikos, Panionios), Slovenia (Union Olimpija), Switzerland (SAV Vacallo Basket), Russia (Dynamo Moscow), Bulgaria (PBC Academic), Cyprus (AEL Limassol), Ukraine (Kyiv), Lithuania (Lietuvos rytas) and Spain (Valencia).

== National team career ==
Mujezinović played for the national basketball team of Bosnia and Herzegovina. He has played at the EuroBasket 1997, EuroBasket 1999, EuroBasket 2001 and EuroBasket 2003.
