= Damir Mršić =

Bosnian basketball player

Personal information
- Born: 25 October 1970 (age 56) Tuzla, SR Bosnia and Herzegovina, SFR Yugoslavia
- Listed height: 6 ft 3 in (1.91 m)
- Listed weight: 200 lb (91 kg)

Career information
- Playing career: 1989–2010
- Position: Shooting guard

Career history
- 1989–1992: Sloboda Dita
- 1992–1995: KK Split
- 1995–1997: Netaş
- 1997–2001: Troy Pilsner/Tuborg Izmir
- 2001–2002: Fenerbahçe
- 2002–2003: UNICS Kazan
- 2003–2004: Dynamo Moscow
- 2004–2010: Fenerbahçe

Career highlights
- 3× Turkish League champion (2007, 2008, 2010); 2× Croatian Cup winner (1993, 1994); Russian Cup winner (2003); Turkish Cup winner (2010); Turkish Supercup winner (2007); Turkish League Top Scorer (2000); 2x Turkish Basketball All-Star Game (2005, 2006)

Damir Mršić (born 25 October 1970) is a retired Bosnian professional basketball player. He also holds Turkish citizenship, under the name Demir Kaan, since 2003. He is one of Fenerbahçe's legendary club players, and was mostly known for his supreme three-point shooting ability.

== Professional career ==
Mršić started his club career playing with the Sloboda Dita Tuzla youth team. He became a professional in 1989, and played three years with Sloboda Dita Tuzla. In 1992, he transferred to KK Split, where he won the Croatian Cup, in 1993 and 1994.

In 1995, he transferred to the Turkish club Netaş, where he spent two years. After that, he spent 4 years at Tuborg İzmir, where he made a big impression in the Turkish League. Turkish giants Fenerbahçe Istanbul signed him for one year in 2001.

After his Fenerbahçe experience, he moved to Russia to play with UNICS Kazan, where he won the Russian Cup. The next year, he played with Dynamo Moscow. In 2004, he moved back to Turkey, to Fenerbahçe İstanbul, which was going to merge with Ülkerspor at the time, and become Fenerbahçe Ülker. He spent 6 years there, and then retired.

== National team career ==
Mršić was a member of the senior Bosnia and Herzegovina national basketball team. With Bosnia, he played at the 2001 EuroBasket, the 2003 EuroBasket, and the 2005 EuroBasket.

== Awards and accomplishments ==
=== Pro club titles ===
- 2× Croatian Cup Winner: (1993, 1994)
- Russian Cup Winner: (2003)
- 3× Turkish Super League Champion: (2007, 2008, 2010)
- Turkish Supercup Winner: (2007)
- Turkish Cup Winner: (2010)

=== Individual ===
- Turkish League Top Scorer: (2000)
- Turkish League Assists Leader: (2001)

== Career statistics ==
=== Domestic leagues ===
Season	Team	League	GP	MPG	2P%	3P%	FT%	RPG	APG	PPG
1997–98	Tuborg	TBL Regular Season	20	36.3	.598	.449	.852	3.2	4.5	18.7
1997–98	Tuborg	TBL Playoffs	3	38.3	.429	.346	.700	3.3	4.0	15.3
1998–99	Tuborg	TBL Regular Season	26	39.4	.599	.381	.789	3.2	4.4	22.7
1998–99	Tuborg	TBL Playoffs	3	40.0	.556	.429	1.000	4.0	4.0	24.0
1999–00	Troy	TBL Regular Season	26	38.4	.569	.417	.854	2.6	4.8	22.8
1999–00	Troy	TBL Playoffs	7	39.4	.533	.462	.917	4.2	5.4	21.9
2000–01	Troy	TBL Regular Season	25	38.5	.518	.368	.822	3.1	7.8	21.2
2000–01	Troy	TBL Playoffs	1	28.0	.667	.333	.600	1.0	9.0	14.0
2001–02	Fenerbahçe	TBL Regular Season	20	39.2	.549	.349	.902	3.4	4.3	21.1
2001–02	Fenerbahçe	TBL Playoffs	5	39.8	.522	.422	.889	3.0	3.8	25.8
2002–03	UNICS Kazan	Russian Championship	24	---	.607	.440	.762	1.3	1.7	8.1
2003–04	Dynamo Moscow	Russian Championship	34	---	.444	.423	.850	1.9	3.2	13.4
2004–05	Fenerbahçe	TBL Regular Season	25	37.4	.488	.413	.795	3.0	4.5	20.2
2004–05	Fenerbahçe	TBL Playoffs	7	38.3	.568	.413	.688	2.3	4.6	20.3
2005–06	Fenerbahçe	TBL Regular Season	28	34.7	.546	.429	.789	1.8	4.6	18.5
2005–06	Fenerbahçe	TBL Playoffs	2	35.5	.000	.471	1.000	3.0	3.0	15.0
2006–07	Fenerbahçe Ülker	TBL Regular Season	30	24.5	.521	.443	.800	1.6	2.1	11.6
2006–07	Fenerbahçe Ülker	TBL Playoffs	9	18.6	.429	.413	.917	1.3	1.4	8.2
2007–08	Fenerbahçe Ülker	TBL Regular Season	28	19.4	.533	.442	.828	1.0	1.9	8.4
2007–08	Fenerbahçe Ülker	TBL Playoffs	10	21.4	.417	.360	.885	2.0	1.6	8.7
2008–09	Fenerbahçe Ülker	TBL Regular Season	28	19.3	.688	.416	.846	1.4	2.3	7.9
2008–09	Fenerbahçe Ülker	TBL Playoffs	11	18.5	.500	.391	.857	1.0	1.2	6.6
2009–10	Fenerbahçe Ülker	TBL Regular Season	22	16.6	.412	.392	.821	1.0	1.0	6.3
2009–10	Fenerbahçe Ülker	TBL Playoffs	8	10.1	1.000	.263	.000	0.3	0.1	2.1
