= OKK Sloboda Tuzla =

Bosnian basketball club

Sloboda Tuzla
- Leagues: Basketball Championship of Bosnia and Herzegovina
- Founded: 1946; 79 years ago
- History: KK Sloboda (1946–2011); OKK Sloboda (2011–present)
- Arena: SKPC Mejdan
- Capacity: 4,900
- Location: Tuzla, Bosnia and Herzegovina
- Team colors: Red and black
- President: Aid Berbić
- Head coach: Nedim Džemić
- Championships: 2 National League; 5 National Cup
- Website: sloboda.ba
Home	Away

Omladinski košarkaški klub Sloboda, (transl. Sloboda Youth Basketball Club), commonly referred to as Sloboda Tuzla, is a men's professional basketball club based in Tuzla, Bosnia and Herzegovina. They are currently competing in the Basketball Championship of Bosnia and Herzegovina.

The club was founded in as KK Sloboda. Since 2011, the club has been competing under the legal name OKK Sloboda. The club is a part of the Sloboda multi-sports club. The Sloboda won 2 National League championships. They have played two different national league systems since 1946, including the Yugoslav Federal League system (1946–1992) and the Bosnian league system (1992 onward). They have also won 5 National Cup titles.

A FIBA Hall of Fame member Mirza Delibašić played for the club from 1968 to 1972. The club is sponsored by Meridianbet.

== History ==
=== Background ===
KK Sloboda, commonly referred to as Sloboda Dita, was a men's professional basketball club based in Tuzla, Bosnia and Herzegovina. The club was formed in 1946 and played its home games at Mejdan Sports Center. The club was shut down in September 2011 due to debts of 3.5 million KM.

Sloboda finished 5th in the inaugural 2001–02 Adriatic League session.

=== Renamed and re-organized ===
OKK Sloboda was founded in 2009 as a youth department of KK Sloboda. After the original club ceased operations in 2011, the new club—under the name of OKK Sloboda Tuzla (OKK Sloboda)—started to compete as they entered the A2 League (3rd-tier) for the 2011–12 season. They went on to win the 2012 A2 League championship and were subsequently promoted to the A1 Liga (2nd-tier) for the 2012–13 season. Sloboda finished second in the 2012–13 season with a record of 18-4 and went on to lose in the championship-deciding game to the first seeded OKK Spars Sarajevo by 10 points.

In 2013, the club was promoted to the Basketball Championship of Bosnia and Herzegovina for the 2013–14 season, returning to the top division for the first time since the 2010–11 season. For their return season to the Bosnian first league, Sloboda signed rookie head coach Damir Mulaomerović. He helped lead them to a fourth-place finish and subsequently earned himself a contract extension for the 2014–15 season.

In July 2019, the club got a wild card for the Second Adriatic League to play in the 2019–20 season.

== Home arena ==
The club plays its home games at SKPC Mejdan in Tuzla. Mejdan has two halls, one small and one big, with most games being played in the bigger hall that has a seating capacity of 4,900, while the smaller one has a seating capacity of 800 for basketball matches.

== Players ==
=== Current roster ===
Note: Flags indicate national team eligibility at FIBA-sanctioned events. Players may hold other non-FIBA nationalities not displayed.

Sloboda Tuzla roster
Players
Coaches

Pos.	No.	Nat.	Name	Ht.	Age
SG	4	(Croatia)	Mustapić, Jakov	1.92 m (6 ft 4 in)	30 – 22 August 1994
PG	5	(Bosnia and Herzegovina)	Alikadić, Adi	1.90 m (6 ft 3 in)	25 – 13 June 1999
SF	6	(Bosnia and Herzegovina)	Jakupović, Jasmin	1.96 m (6 ft 5 in)	28 – 1 April 1997
G	7	(Bosnia and Herzegovina)	Andelija, Haris	1.85 m (6 ft 1 in)	24 – 16 September 2000
SG	8	(United States)	Davis Jr., Darell	1.98 m (6 ft 6 in)	28 – 9 May 1996
SF	9	(Montenegro)	Bojić, Bogdan	2.01 m (6 ft 7 in)	26 – 3 March 1999
SF	10	(Serbia)	Munižaba, Milan	1.98 m (6 ft 6 in)	27 – 10 February 1998
C	11	(Bosnia and Herzegovina)	Krajinić, Emir	2.08 m (6 ft 10 in)	22 – 9 May 2002
PF	13	(Bosnia and Herzegovina)	Omerović, Nedim	2.04 m (6 ft 8 in)	24 – 10 August 2000
G		(Russia)	Lobarev, Pavel	1.93 m (6 ft 4 in)	27 – 5 October 1997

Head coach

- (Bosnia and Herzegovina) Nedim Džemić

Assistant coach(es)

- (Bosnia and Herzegovina) Adnan Žunić

Legend

- (C) Team captain
- Injured

- Roster
Updated: January 14, 2021

== Coaches ==
KK Sloboda (1946–2011)

- (Socialist Federal Republic of Yugoslavia) Marijan Novović (1975–1977)
- (Socialist Federal Republic of Yugoslavia) Vlade Đurović (1978–1982)
- (Socialist Federal Republic of Yugoslavia) Borislav Džaković (1984–1987)
- (Socialist Federal Republic of Yugoslavia) Mihajlo Vuković (1989–1990)
- (Socialist Federal Republic of Yugoslavia) Borislav Džaković (1990–1992)
- (Serbia and Montenegro) Velimir Gašić (2001–2003)
- (Serbia and Montenegro) Borislav Džaković (2003–2006)
- (Bosnia and Herzegovina) Senad Muminović (2008–2010)

OKK Sloboda (2011–present)

- (Croatia) Damir Mulaomerović (2013–2015)
- (Serbia) Velimir Gašić (2016–2017)
- (Bosnia and Herzegovina) Eldar Kavgić (2017–2018)
- (Bosnia and Herzegovina) Ivan Velić (2018)
- (Bosnia and Herzegovina) Josip Pandža (2018–2019)
- (Croatia) Damir Mulaomerović (2019–2021)
- (Bosnia and Herzegovina) Nedim Džemić (2021–present)

== Trophies ==
- Bosnia and Herzegovina Championship
  - Winner (2): 1993–94, 1995–96
- Bosnia and Herzegovina Cup
  - Winner (5): 1994, 1995, 1996, 1999, 2001
- Bosnian A1 League (2nd-tier)
  - Winner (7): 1993–94, 1995–96, 1996–97, 1998–99, 1999–2000, 2000–01, 2001–02
- Bosnian A2 League (3rd-tier)
  - Winner (1): 2012–13^{OKK}

Notes

^{OKK} Won by OKK Sloboda

== Notable players ==
KK Sloboda

- (Bosnia and Herzegovina) (Turkey) Asım Pars
- (Bosnia and Herzegovina) (Slovenia) Mirza Begić
- (Bosnia and Herzegovina) (Turkey) Nedim Dal
- (Bosnia and Herzegovina) Mirza Delibašić
- (Bosnia and Herzegovina) Jasmin Hukić
- (Bosnia and Herzegovina) Zlatko Jovanović
- (Bosnia and Herzegovina) Elmedin Kikanović
- (Serbia) (Slovenia) Mileta Lisica
- (Bosnia and Herzegovina) (Turkey) Damir Mršić
- (Bosnia and Herzegovina) (Croatia) Damir Mulaomerović
- (Bosnia and Herzegovina) (Croatia) Dalibor Peršić
- (Bosnia and Herzegovina) Mirza Teletović
