= 1990–91 Yugoslav First Basketball League =

- League: Yugoslav First Basketball League
- Sport: Basketball

Regular season
- Season champions: (Socialist Republic of Croatia) POP 84
- Top scorer: Arijan Komazec (Zadar)

Playoffs
- Finals champions: (Socialist Republic of Croatia) POP 84
- Runners-up: Partizan

Yugoslav First Basketball League seasons
- ← 1989–90 1991–92 (YUBA) →

The 1990–91 Yugoslav First Basketball League season was the 47th season of the Yugoslav First Basketball League, the highest professional basketball league in SFR Yugoslavia. It was the last edition that featured Croatian teams.

== Teams ==
(Socialist Republic of Croatia) SR Croatia

- Cibona
- POP 84
- Šibenka
- Zadar

(Socialist Republic of Serbia) SR Serbia

- Crvena Zvezda
- IMT
- Partizan
- Vojvodina

(Socialist Republic of Bosnia and Herzegovina) SR Bosnia and Herzegovina

- Bosna
- Čelik

(Socialist Republic of Montenegro) SR Montenegro

- Budućnost

(Socialist Republic of Slovenia) SR Slovenia

- Smelt Olimpija

== Regular season ==
=== Classification ===
	Regular season ranking 1990-91	G	V	P	PF	PS	Pt
1.	POP 84	22	19	3	1947	1679	41
2.	Partizan	22	18	4	2148	1901	40
3.	Cibona	22	15	7	1971	1853	37
4.	Zadar	22	13	9	1924	1885	35
5.	Vojvodina	22	10	12	1888	1902	32
6.	IMT	22	10	12	1857	1892	32
7.	Smelt Olimpija	22	10	12	1944	1986	32
8.	Bosna	22	8	14	1882	1990	30
9.	Crvena Zvezda	22	8	14	1943	2047	30
10.	Budućnost	22	7	15	1771	1943	29
11.	Šibenka	22	7	15	1821	1907	29
12.	Čelik	22	7	15	1785	1930	29

== Results ==
Home \ Away	POP	PAR	CIB	ZAD	VOJ	IMT	OLI	BOS	CZV	BUD	ŠIB	ČEL
POP 84	—	94–69	85–81	90–68	90–78	91–69	99–76	115–73	95–88	98–75	83–70	88–70
Partizan	106–93	—	107–87	110–98	81–67	105–87	115–87	104–98	108–79	121–79	90–79	93–75
Cibona	63–75	98–95	—	98–87	97–91	98–82	84–78	113–97	99–76	109–77	91–87	93–72
Zadar	81–72	73–66	70–72	—	89–61	94–77	96–89	92–89	105–76	93–78	94–87	87–62
Vojvodina	69–79	75–84	82–80	114–95	—	108–87	100–79	93–82	98–101	95–75	89–87	91–69
IMT	76–81	89–109	75–83	82–77	101–107	—	96–92	70–63	91–81	95–69	86–92	88–91
Smelt Olimpija	77–85	104–98	98–95	82–77	93–75	89–94	—	85–84	104–119	114–103	81–84	80–67
Bosna	76–69	89–101	96–94	78–82	89–83	94–91	99–91	—	105–88	84–104	83–77	87–80
Crvena Zvezda	87–97	95–100	74–82	111–99	93–94	66–90	86–102	87–76	—	93–68	78–76	104–76
Budućnost	76–90	89–98	80–74	82–89	71–60	82–89	58–74	84–70	82–68	—	80–72	97–75
Šibenka	74–93	89–100	89–90	74–88	79–72	57–68	77–74	105–99	100–103	98–96	—	99–96
Čelik	79–85	88–94	80–90	101–89	102–85	71–79	94–96	81–79	100–89	84–66	73–71	—

Source: KOŠ magazin
Legend: Blue = home team win; Red = away team win.
Matches with lighter background shading were decided after overtime.

== Playoff ==
Semifinals
1	POP 84	2
4	Zadar	1
2	Partizan	2
3	Cibona	1

Finals
1	POP 84	3
2	Partizan	0

SEMIFINALS

POP 84-Zadar 86-75, 68-70, 71-66

Partizan-Cibona 105-98, 77-94, 77-75

FINALS

POP 84-Partizan 85-74, 95-91, 86-64

GROUP KORAC

Bosna-Rabotnicki 105-98, 84-87, 109-86

Olimpija-Oveko 87-89, 92-99, 89-85

Vojvodina-Bosna 92-77, 81-63

IMT-Olimpija 100-89, 83-103, 82-93

Bosna-Oveko 84-71, 93-82

The winning roster of POP 84:

- (Socialist Federal Republic of Yugoslavia) Zoran Sretenović
- (Socialist Federal Republic of Yugoslavia) Velimir Perasović
- (Socialist Federal Republic of Yugoslavia) Toni Kukoč
- (Socialist Federal Republic of Yugoslavia) Petar Naumoski
- (Socialist Federal Republic of Yugoslavia) Edi Vulić
- (Socialist Federal Republic of Yugoslavia) Velibor Radović
- (Socialist Federal Republic of Yugoslavia) Zoran Savić
- (Socialist Federal Republic of Yugoslavia) Aramis Naglić
- (Socialist Federal Republic of Yugoslavia) Žan Tabak
- (Socialist Federal Republic of Yugoslavia) Paško Tomić
- (Socialist Federal Republic of Yugoslavia) Teo Čizmić
- (Socialist Federal Republic of Yugoslavia) Luka Pavićević

Coach: (Socialist Federal Republic of Yugoslavia) Željko Pavličević

== Qualification in 1991-92 season European competitions ==
=== FIBA European League ===
- POP 84 (champions)
- Partizan (2nd)
- Cibona (3rd)

=== FIBA European Cup ===
- Smelt Olimpija (playoffs)

=== FIBA Korać Cup ===
- Zadar (4th)
- Vojvodina (playoffs)
- Bosna (playoffs)

== All-Star Game ==
The season saw the first ever Yugoslav Basketball League All-Star Game (known as Yu All-Star take place in Sarajevo's Skenderija Hall on Tuesday, 7 May 1991 after the league playoffs ended. The event was not organized by the Yugoslav Basketball Federation (KSJ), but rather as an exhibition showcase put together by the host club KK Bosna and Sarajevo-based Večernje novine daily newspaper.

Red team coached by Duško Vujošević and the White team coached by Željko Pavličević, the 1990-91 Yugoslav League twenty-four best players contested a game that ended 125-114 for the White team.

The Reds (Crveni) consisted of: 4. Željko Obradović, 5. Zdravko Radulović, 6. Velimir Perasović, 7. Jure Zdovc, 8. Radisav Ćurčić, 9. Danko Cvjetićanin, 10. Mario Primorac, 11. Samir Avdić 12. Andro Knego, 13. Zoran Savić, 14. Žarko Paspalj, and Ivica Marić.

The Whites (Bijeli) consisted of: 4. Aleksandar Đorđević, 5. Predrag Danilović, 6. Zoran Sretenović, 7. Toni Kukoč, 8. Zoran Čutura, 9. Sejo Bukva, 10. Zoran Jovanović, 11. Miroslav Pecarski, 12. Saša Radunović, 13. Arijan Komazec, Žan Tabak, and 15. Ivo Nakić.

In addition to the All-Star game, a three-point shootout competition and a dunk contest were held during the game's halftime.

=== 3-point shootout ===
Total of 19 players signed up for the shootout that consisted of 25 shots from five different positions in 60 seconds — five racks of five balls each — with each regular ball made worth one point and the last ball in each rack (moneyball) worth two points. In the preliminary qualification, the best five were chosen for the final that took place during the All-Star Game halftime.

The 3-point shootout finalists were:

- Danko Cvjetićanin
- Velimir Perasović
- Arijan Komazec (winner)
- Miroljub Mitrović
- Željko Obradović

Arijan Komazec beat Danko Cvjetićanin in the final due to the better first additional round. In addition to the trophy, he received a money prize of YUD30,000.

=== Dunk contest ===
Four players made the final:

- Toni Kukoč (winner)
- Miroslav Pecarski
- Samir Avdić
- Zoran Bacalja, 18-year-old KK Zadar junior player

Five judges for the dunk competition were: Žarko Varajić, Mirza Delibašić, Branko Macura, Mišo Ostarčević, and Vinko Jelovac.

Toni Kukoč beat Zoran Bacalja in the final.

== Basketball Cup ==
=== Bracket ===
Eightfinals
Zadar	99
Zorka Šabac	84
Smelt Olimpija	107
Sloboda DITA Tuzla	96
POP 84	109
Priština	57
Partizan	96
IMT	79
Cibona	121
Vardar	71
Vojvodina	101
Lovćen	73
Radnički Belgrade	121
Radnički Kragujevac	106
Bosna	108
Šibenka	82

Quarterfinals
Zadar	82
Smelt Olimpija	93
POP 84	91
Partizan	86
Cibona	107
Vojvodina	93
Bosna	98
Radnički Belgrade	88

Semifinals
Smelt Olimpija	69
POP 84	72
Cibona	98
Bosna	84

Finals
POP 84	80
Cibona	79
