= 2022–23 Basketball Championship of Bosnia and Herzegovina =

Prvenstvo BiH
- Season: 2022–23
- Teams: 12

Finals
- Champions: Igokea
- Runners-up: Borac WWIN
- Third place: Široki
- Fourth place: Budućnost PROLAB

The 2022–23 Basketball Championship of Bosnia and Herzegovina is 22nd season of this championship, with 13 teams from Bosnia and Herzegovina participating in it.

KK Igokea is the defending champion.

== Competition format ==
Twelve of thirteen teams joined the regular season, playing with as double round-robin tournament. The first seven teams joined playoffs along with KK Igokea.

The last team will be relegated.

== Teams and locations ==
=== Promotion and relegation ===
Budućnost and Slavija were promoted, while Čelik was relegated.

Radnik and Bratunac withdrew from the competition.

Locations of the 2022–23 season teams

Team	City	Venue
Borac WWIN	Banja Luka	Borik Sports Hall
Bosna Meridianbet	Sarajevo	Mirza Delibašić Hall
Budućnost PROLAB	Bijeljina	
Igokea	Laktaši	Laktaši Sports Hall
Leotar	Trebinje	Miloš Mrdić Sports Hall
Mladost	Mrkonjić Grad	Komercijalna banka Arena
Posušje	Posušje	GSD Posušje
Promo	Donji Vakuf	Donji Vakuf Sports Hall
Slavija	Istočno Sarajevo	
Sloboda	Tuzla	SKPC Mejdan
Spars	Ilidža	Novo Sarajevo Sports Hall
Široki	Široki Brijeg	Pecara Sports Hall
Zrinjski	Mostar	Bijeli Brijeg Sports Hall

Teams that play in the 2022–23 Adriatic League First Division
Teams that play in the 2022–22 Adriatic League Second Division

== Regular season ==
=== Standings ===
Pos	Team	Pld	W	L	GF	GA	GD	Pts	
1	Široki	22	21	1	1856	1442	+414	43	Qualification for the Playoffs
2	Borac Banja Luka	22	18	4	1881	1669	+212	40	Qualification for the Playoffs
3	Budućnost PROLAB	22	17	5	1982	1734	+248	39	Qualification for the Playoffs
4	Bosna MeridianBet	22	15	7	1854	1723	+131	37	Qualification for the Playoffs
5	Leotar	22	13	9	1779	1706	+73	35	Qualification for the Playoffs
6	Slavija	22	11	11	1783	1834	−51	33	Qualification for the Playoffs
7	Spars	22	10	12	1840	1867	−27	32	Qualification for the Playoffs
8	Sloboda Tuzla	22	9	13	1809	1799	+10	31	
9	Posušje	22	6	16	1635	1806	−171	28	
10	Promo	22	5	17	1740	1975	−235	27	
11	Mladost Mrkonjić Grad	22	4	18	1664	1923	−259	26	
12	Zrinjski	22	3	19	1679	2024	−345	25	Relegated

Source: Basketball Federation of BiH

== Playoffs ==
Playoffs will be played in a best-of-three games format.

=== Bracket ===
Quarter-finals
Igokea	2
Spars	0
Budućnost PROLAB	2
Bosna Meridianbet	1
Borac WWIN	2
Leotar	0
Široki	2
Slavija	0

Semi-finals
Igokea	2
Budućnost PROLAB	0
Borac WWIN	2
Široki	0

Final
Igokea	3
Borac WWIN	0
Third place
Široki	3
Budućnost PROLAB	1

Source: Basketball Federation of BiH

=== Quarter-finals ===
Team 1	Series	Team 2	Game 1	Game 2	Game 3
Igokea	2–0	Spars	77-54	99-82	X
Budućnost PROLAB	2–1	Bosna Meridianbet	82-68	87-92	94-59
Borac WWIN	2–0	Leotar	77-60	78-82	X
Široki	2–0	Slavija	106-68	64-97	X

=== Semi-finals ===
Team 1	Series	Team 2	Game 1	Game 2	Game 3
Igokea	2–0	Budućnost PROLAB	94-74	92-90	X
Borac WWIN	2–0	Široki	89-81	75-59	X

=== Finals ===
Team 1	Series	Team 2	Game 1	Game 2	Game 3
Igokea	3-0	Borac WWIN	76-55	69-57	89-83

== Clubs in European competitions ==
Team	Competition	Progress
Igokea	Champions League	Regular season
