= YUBA All-Star Game =

YUBA Basketball All-Star Game
- Status: Inactive
- Inaugurated: 1997
- Most recent: 2003
- Organizer: YUBA League

The YUBA All-Star Game was an annual basketball event in Yugoslavia, organised by the YUBA League and it was established in 1997. The YUBA All-Star Game lasted until 2003.

Montenegrin Mladen Šekularac is the player with the most participations in the history of the event.

== Background ==
The previous All-Star Game experience in Yugoslavia was the 1991 Yu All-Star just before the country was dissolved. That event included all the big names who played in the unified Yugoslav League, including Croatians Toni Kukoc and Dino Radja, Slovenian Jure Zdovc, Bosnian Mario Primorac and many others. Then in 1992 the YUBA League was founded and lasted until 2006 (when Yugoslavia was split to two countries, Serbia and Montenegro).

In 1997 the YUBA League followed the example of the Croatian Federation and launched its own All-Star Game, six years since the Yu All-Star (the Croatian All-Star Game started in the 1992–94 season).

== All Star Game events ==
Apart from the main match, the All Star Game included a three-point shootout and a slam-dunk contest.

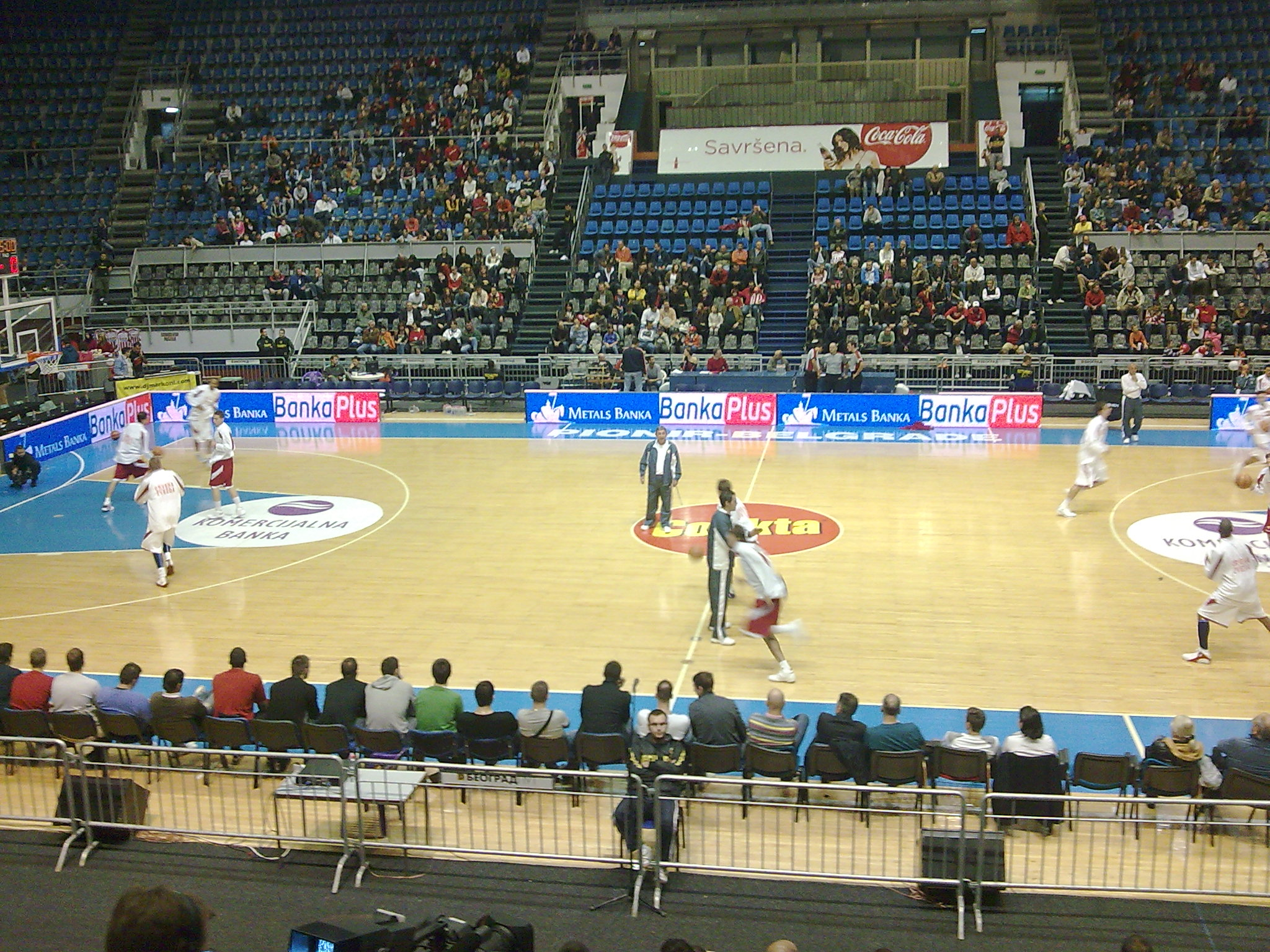
The Hala Pionir hosted the majority of the YUBA All-Star Games.

=== Slam-Dunk winners ===
Year	Venue	Player	Team
1998	Hala Pionir, Belgrade	(Serbia) (Greece) Vladimir Petrović	KK Borac Čačak
2003	Hala Pionir, Belgrade		

== Aftermath ==
A few years after the last YUBA All-Star edition in 2003, the Adriatic Basketball Association All-Star Game was established for players from the former Yugoslavia leagues.

== Players with most appearances ==
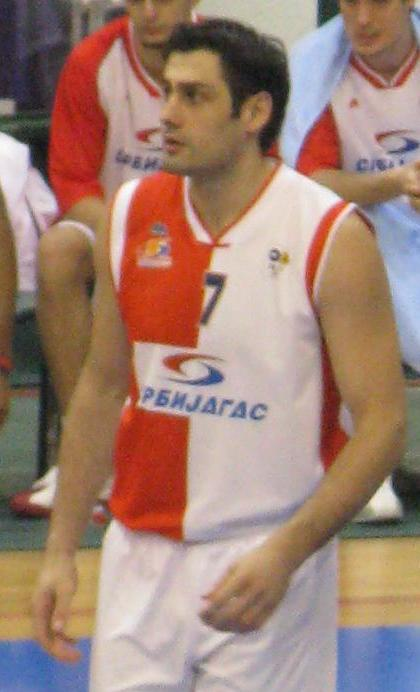
Jovo Stanojević participated twice in the YUBA All-Star Game.

Player	All-Star	Editions	Notes
(Montenegro) Mladen Šekularac	4	1999, 2000, 2001, 2002	
(Serbia) Dejan Milojevic	3	1999, 2000, 2001	
(Serbia) Vlado Scepanovic	3	1998, 1999, 2000	
(Serbia) Dejan Tomasevic	2	1999, 2000	
(Serbia) Nenad Canak	2	1999, 2000	
(Serbia) Milenko Topic	2	1998, 2000	1x MVP (2000)
(Serbia) Veselin Petrovic	2	1999, 2000	
(Serbia) (Germany) Aleksandar Nađfeji	2	1999, 2001	
(Serbia) Jovo Stanojević	2	1999, 2000	
(Serbia) Ognjen Aškrabić	2	2000, 2001	
(Serbia) Milos Vujanic	2	2001, 2003	

=== Eligible foreign players for selection (1997-2001) ===
- (United States) Simeon Haley – Crvena zvezda (1997)
- (United States) (Socialist Federal Republic of Yugoslavia) Dayon Ninkovic – Crvena zvezda (1998)
- (Austria) (Socialist Federal Republic of Yugoslavia) Neno Ašćerić – Crvena zvezda (2000)
- (Germany) (Socialist Federal Republic of Yugoslavia) Neno Ašćerić – KK Partizan (2000)
- (Socialist Federal Republic of Yugoslavia) (Greece) Dusan Jelic – Crvena zvezda (2000–2001)
- (United States) Jason Crowe – KK Sloga (2000–2001)
- (France) (Socialist Federal Republic of Yugoslavia) Predrag Materić – KK Partizan (2001–2002, 2003–2004)
- (United States) Peter Cornell – KK Partizan (2001)
- (United States) Schea Cotton – KK Partizan (2001)
- (United States) Daymeon Fishback – Crvena zvezda (2000–2001)
- (United States) Mahmoud Jameel – KK Sloga (2000–2001)

== Other notable participants ==
- (Socialist Federal Republic of Yugoslavia) Nikola Jestratijević (2000)
- (Socialist Federal Republic of Yugoslavia) Dragan Lukovski (2000)
- (Socialist Federal Republic of Yugoslavia) Igor Rakočević (1999)
- (Socialist Federal Republic of Yugoslavia) Djuro Ostojic (1999)
- (Socialist Federal Republic of Yugoslavia) Stevan Nađfeji (2001)
- (Socialist Federal Republic of Yugoslavia) Aleksandar Glintić (1998)
- (Socialist Federal Republic of Yugoslavia) Miroslav Beric (1997)
- (Socialist Federal Republic of Yugoslavia) Dusan Kecman (2001)
- (Socialist Federal Republic of Yugoslavia) (Montenegro) Žarko Čabarkapa (2001)
- (Montenegro) Goran Nikolić (2001)
- (Socialist Federal Republic of Yugoslavia) Vladimir Tica (2001)
- (Montenegro) Nebojša Bogavac (2001)
- (Socialist Federal Republic of Yugoslavia) Goran Ćakić (2001)
- (Socialist Federal Republic of Yugoslavia) Vladimir Kuzmanović (1999)

== See also ==
- Croatian Basketball All-Star Game
