= Damir Zeljković =

Personal information
- Born: 15 February 1981 (age 45) Sarajevo, SR Bosnia and Herzegovina, SFR Yugoslavia
- Coaching career: 2006–present

Career history

Coaching
- 2006–2007: KK Bosna (youth)
- 2008–2011: Slavija
- 2010–2013: Bosnia and Herzegovina U16
- 2011: KK Bosna
- 2011–2013: KK Bosna (youth)
- 2014–2015: KK Bosna
- 2016–2018: OKK Čelik
- 2018–2022: Bayern Munich (youth)
- 2022–present: Bayern Munich II (assistant coach)

Damir Zeljković (born 15 February 1981 in Sarajevo, Bosnia and Herzegovina) is a Bosnian professional basketball coach. He has coached several clubs in Bosnia and Herzegovina as well as the country's youth national team selections. He is currently part of the coaching staff of Bayern Munich II in Germany.

== Coaching career ==
Zeljković began his professional coaching career in Bosnia and Herzegovina, working with youth and senior teams in the KK Bosna system. In 2014 Zeljković was appointed head coach of KK Bosna, one of Bosnia and Herzegovina's historic clubs, during a period of organizational challenges for the team. He previously served in Bosna's coaching structure, including working with its youth team before taking over senior responsibilities.

He coached OKK Čelik, a club competing in the A1 League, where he served as head coach and led preparations for competitive seasons.

After his domestic coaching roles, Zeljković moved abroad and joined the coaching staff of FC Bayern Munich II in Germany as an assistant coach beginning in the 2022–23 season. In that role he has been involved in developing young players and contributing to the club's second team program.
