= Goran Šehovac =

Personal information
- Born: 11 July 1975 (age 51) Sarajevo, SR Bosnia and Herzegovina, SFR Yugoslavia
- Coaching career: 2006–present

Career history

Coaching
- 2006-2008: KK Bosna (youth)
- 2008: KK Bosna (interim)
- 2009–2010: KK Bosna
- 2010–2011: Slavija
- 2016–2017: KK Radnik Bijeljina
- 2017–2018: Slavija
- 2018–2019: KK Vogošća
- 2019–2020: Spars
- 2023–2024: KK Koš
- 2024–present: Spars (youth)

Goran Šehovac is a Bosnian professional basketball coach, born in Sarajevo. He has coached several clubs in Bosnia and Herzegovina, including KK Bosna, Slavija and Spars, and has also worked with Bosnia and Herzegovina's youth national selections.

== Coaching career ==
In early November 2008, Šehovac assumed temporary charge of KK Bosna for a single Adriatic League game, following the resignation of head coach Alen Abaz and prior to the arrival of Vlada Vukoičić as his permanent successor.

Šehovac continued his coaching career at Slavija, the club based in East Sarajevo, working first in its youth setup before taking charge of the senior team on multiple occasions. He also served as head coach of KK Bosna, competing at the time as Bosna ASA BH Telecom in the regional NLB League, leading the team before resigning from the position following a home defeat to Cedevita of Zagreb.

Over the following years he also coached Građanski and KK Radnik in Bijeljina, and at one point coached Bosnia and Herzegovina's cadet (under-16) national team. In 2018, he took over as head coach of KK Vogošća.

In 2019, Šehovac was appointed head coach of Spars in Sarajevo, guiding the club in the second-tier ABA League 2.

In August 2023, following a period without a club, Šehovac was named head coach of KK Koš in Sarajevo, taking charge of the club's youth program. In 2024 he was appointed coach of Spars' youth program.
