= Muhamed Pašalić =

Bosnian basketball player and coach (born 1987)

Personal information
- Born: 27 August 1987 (age 39) Sarajevo, SR Bosnia and Herzegovina, SFR Yugoslavia
- Listed height: 6 ft 4 in (1.93 m)
- Listed weight: 186 lb (84 kg)

Career information
- NBA draft: 2009: undrafted
- Playing career: 2005–2024
- Position: Point guard / shooting guard
- Coaching career: 2025–present

Career history

Playing
- 2005–2007: Vogošća
- 2007–2011: Bosna
- 2011–2012: Kavala
- 2012–2013: Aris Thessaloniki
- 2013–2014: Reims Champagne Basket
- 2014–2015: Aris Thessaloniki
- 2015–2016: U-BT Cluj-Napoca
- 2016–2019: CSM Oradea
- 2019: Panionios
- 2019–2020: Krka
- 2020–2021: Bosna
- 2021–2022: Mons-Hainaut
- 2022–2024: Bosna

Coaching
- 2025–2026: Bosna

Career highlights
- As player: Bosnian League champion (2008); 3× Bosnian Cup winner (2009, 2010, 2024); 2× Liga Națională champion (2018, 2019); Romanian Cup winner (2016); As head coach: Bosnian League champion (2026); Bosnian Cup winner (2026)

Muhamed Pašalić (born 27 August 1987) is a Bosnian professional basketball coach and former player. As a player, he represented the Bosnia and Herzegovina national team internationally.

== Professional career ==
Born in Sarajevo in 1987, Pašalić made his professional debut for hometown club Bosna in the 2006–07 season. In August 2011, he moved to Kavala in Greece, where he would spend just one season. In August 2012, he signed with Aris for the 2012–13 season.

After playing for Reims Champagne Basket in the 2013–14 season, Pašalić returned to Aris for the 2014–15 season. In June 2015, he signed with Romanian League club U-BT Cluj-Napoca. On 14 July 2016, he joined CSM Oradea.

On 1 September 2019, Pašalić returned to Greece and signed with Panionios. He was released from his contract in December the same year, in order to attend to his newborn second child. On 3 August 2021, he signed with Mons-Hainaut in Belgium.

Pašalić returned to Bosna in 2022, before retiring in August 2024.

== National team career ==
Pašalić first played for Bosnia and Herzegovina at EuroBasket 2013. He was also on the roster for EuroBasket 2015.

== Coaching career ==
After his retirement as an active player in 2024, Pašalić immediately became an assistant coach at Bosna. Following Aleksandar Damjanović's resignation as Bosna's head coach in October 2025, Pašalić was appointed as his successor.

== Honours and awards ==
=== Club achievements ===
- Bosna (2007–2011, 2022–2024)
  - Bosnian League champion: (2007–08)
  - 3× Bosnian Cup winner: (2008–09, 2009–10, 2023–24)
- U-BT Cluj-Napoca (2015–2016)
  - Romanian Cup winner: (2015–16)
- CSM Oradea (2016–2019)
  - 2× Liga Națională champion: (2017–18, 2018–19)

=== Coaching honours ===
- Bosna (2025–present)
  - Bosnian League champion: (2025–26)
  - Bosnian Cup winner: (2025–26)
