= 1991 Yugoslav Basketball All-Star Game =

The 1991 Yugoslav Basketball All-Star Game (also known as 1991 Yu All-Star) was a one-off basketball event in former Yugoslavia. It was held towards the end of the 1990-91 season, and it was the only basketball All-Star Game to take place in former Yugoslavia.

The 1992 edition was cancelled due to the Yugoslav Wars.

== Events ==
=== The Game ===
1991 Yu All-Star
| Team Crveni | Team Bijeli |
|---|---|
| 115 | 124 |
- Date: May 7, 1991
- Venue: Skenderija Hall, Sarajevo
- MVP: Toni Kukoc
- Attendance: 7,000

The first Yu All-Star match was held in Bosnia, in Sarajevo's Skenderija Hall on Tuesday, on May 7, 1991. The event was organized by host club KK Bosna and Sarajevo-based Večernje novine daily newspaper as an exhibition showcase.

The organizers decided to time the game in accordance with the NBA rules: four quarters of twelve minutes each rather than the then FIBA customary two halves of twenty minutes each. The Red team were coached by Duško Vujošević and the White team by Željko Pavličević. Overall, the twenty-four best Yugoslav players played in a game that ended 125-114 for the White team.

The topscorer of the game was Žarko Paspalj with 31 points for the Reds, while Aleksandar Đorđević had 24 for the Whites. Toni Kukoč scored 22, Zoran Savić 17 and Arijan Komazec 16. Top assister was Aleksandar Đorđević with 8 and top rebounders were Zoran Savić with 9 and Toni Kukoč with 8.

The venue of 1991 Yu All-Star, the Skenderija Sports Arena

==== Rosters ====
Team Crveni (Red)
| Number | Player | Team |
|---|---|---|
| #4 | (Socialist Federal Republic of Yugoslavia) Željko Obradović | (Socialist Federal Republic of Yugoslavia) KK Partizan |
| #5 | (Socialist Federal Republic of Yugoslavia) (Croatia) Zdravko Radulović | (Socialist Federal Republic of Yugoslavia) (Croatia) KK Cibona |
| #6 | (Socialist Federal Republic of Yugoslavia) (Croatia) Velimir Perasović | (Socialist Federal Republic of Yugoslavia) (Croatia) Jugoplastika Split |
| #7 | (Socialist Federal Republic of Yugoslavia) (Slovenia) Jure Zdovc | (Socialist Federal Republic of Yugoslavia) (Slovenia) Smelt Olimpija |
| #8 | (Socialist Federal Republic of Yugoslavia) Radisav Ćurčić | (Socialist Federal Republic of Yugoslavia) (Slovenia) Smelt Olimpija |
| #9 | (Socialist Federal Republic of Yugoslavia) (Croatia) Danko Cvjetićanin | (Socialist Federal Republic of Yugoslavia) (Croatia) KK Cibona |
| #10 | (Socialist Federal Republic of Yugoslavia) (Bosnia and Herzegovina) Mario Primorac | (Socialist Federal Republic of Yugoslavia) (Bosnia and Herzegovina) KK Bosna |
| #11 | (Socialist Federal Republic of Yugoslavia) (Bosnia and Herzegovina) Samir Avdić | (Socialist Federal Republic of Yugoslavia) (Bosnia and Herzegovina) KK Bosna |
| #12 | (Socialist Federal Republic of Yugoslavia) (Croatia) Andro Knego | (Socialist Federal Republic of Yugoslavia) KK Cibona |
| #13 | (Socialist Federal Republic of Yugoslavia) Zoran Savić | (Socialist Federal Republic of Yugoslavia) (Croatia) Jugoplastika Split |
| #14 | (Socialist Federal Republic of Yugoslavia) Žarko Paspalj | (Socialist Federal Republic of Yugoslavia) KK Partizan |
| #15 | (Socialist Federal Republic of Yugoslavia) (Croatia) Ivica Marić | (Socialist Federal Republic of Yugoslavia) (Bosnia and Herzegovina) Čelik Zenica |
| Coach | | |
| | (Socialist Federal Republic of Yugoslavia) Duško Vujošević | KK Partizan (Socialist Federal Republic of Yugoslavia) |

Team Bijeli (White)
| Number | Player | Team |
|---|---|---|
| #4 | (Socialist Federal Republic of Yugoslavia) Aleksandar Đorđević | (Socialist Federal Republic of Yugoslavia) KK Partizan |
| #5 | (Socialist Federal Republic of Yugoslavia) Predrag Danilović | (Socialist Federal Republic of Yugoslavia) (Croatia) KK Cibona |
| #6 | (Socialist Federal Republic of Yugoslavia) (Croatia) Zoran Sretenović | (Socialist Federal Republic of Yugoslavia) (Croatia) Jugoplastika Split |
| #7 | (Socialist Federal Republic of Yugoslavia) (Croatia) Toni Kukoč | (Socialist Federal Republic of Yugoslavia) (Croatia) Jugoplastika Split |
| #8 | (Socialist Federal Republic of Yugoslavia) (Croatia) Zoran Čutura | (Socialist Federal Republic of Yugoslavia) (Croatia) KK Cibona |
| #9 | (Socialist Federal Republic of Yugoslavia) (Bosnia and Herzegovina) Sejo Bukva | (Socialist Federal Republic of Yugoslavia) (Bosnia and Herzegovina) KK Bosna |
| #10 | (Socialist Federal Republic of Yugoslavia) Zoran Jovanović | (Socialist Federal Republic of Yugoslavia) KK Crvena zvezda |
| #11 | (Socialist Federal Republic of Yugoslavia) Miroslav Pecarski | (Socialist Federal Republic of Yugoslavia) KK Partizan |
| #12 | (Socialist Federal Republic of Yugoslavia) (Montenegro) Saša Radunović | (Socialist Federal Republic of Yugoslavia) (Montenegro) KK Budućnost Podgorica |
| #13 | (Socialist Federal Republic of Yugoslavia) (Croatia) Arijan Komazec | (Socialist Federal Republic of Yugoslavia) (Croatia) KK Zadar |
| #14 | (Socialist Federal Republic of Yugoslavia) (Croatia) Zan Tabak | (Socialist Federal Republic of Yugoslavia) (Croatia) Jugoplastika Split |
| #15 | (Socialist Federal Republic of Yugoslavia) (Croatia) Ivo Nakic | (Socialist Federal Republic of Yugoslavia) KK Partizan |
| Coach | | |
| | (Socialist Federal Republic of Yugoslavia) (Croatia) Željko Pavličević | (Socialist Federal Republic of Yugoslavia) (Croatia) Jugoplastika Split |

=== Three-point shootout ===
Total of 19 players signed up for the shootout that consisted of 25 shots from five different positions in 60 seconds — five racks of five balls each — with each regular ball made worth one point and the last ball in each rack (moneyball) worth two points. In the preliminary qualification, the best five were chosen for the final that took place during the All-Star Game halftime.

The three-point shootout finalists were:

- Danko Cvjetićanin
- Velimir Perasović
- Arijan Komazec
- Miroljub Mitrović
- Željko Obradović

The final's first elimination stage was played in two rounds with each player's best score taken for classification. The two best scores posted were Komazec's and Cvjetićanin's — Komazec had 25 points in his second round while Cvjetićanin had 20 points in his first.

The two went head-to-head for the title in additional two rounds.

- In the first additional round, Danko Cvjetićanin had 19 points while Arijan Komazec had 14.
- In the second additional round, Danko Cvjetićanin posted 23 points while Arijan Komazec also had 23.

Arijan Komazec won due to the better first additional round. In addition to the trophy, he received a money prize of YUD 30,000.

=== Slum-dunk contest ===
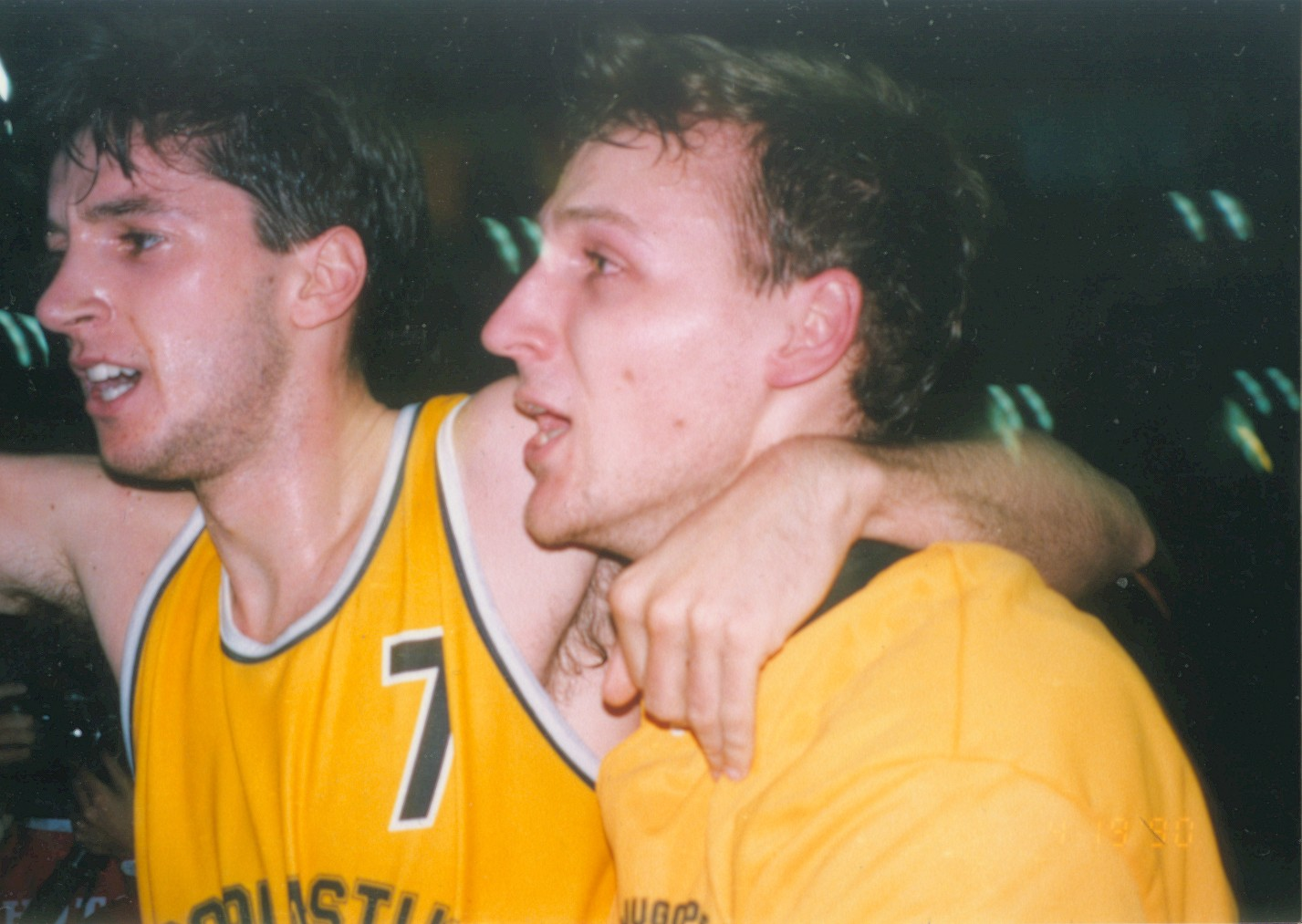
Toni Kukoč and Dino Radja played in the 1991 Yu All-Star. Kukoc was named MVP and slam-dunk champion.

Four players made the final:

- Toni Kukoč
- Miroslav Pecarski
- Samir Avdić
- Zoran Bacalja, 18-year-old KK Zadar junior player

Five judges for the dunk competition were: Žarko Varajić, Mirza Delibašić, Branko Macura, Nedjeljko "Mišo" Oštarčević, and Vinko Jelovac.

- In the first round, Avdić's dunk earned 41 points, Kukoč's 48, Bacalja's 44, and Pecarski's 43
- In the second round, Avdić had 46 points, Toni Kukoč 46, Zoran Bacalja 50 (behind the back dunk on the second try), and Miroslav Pecarski 45
- In the third round, Avdić had 46 points, Kukoč 50 (one-handed dunk from the free-throw line), Bacalja 50 (behind the back dunk after a bounce), and Pecarski 46.

Toni Kukoč and Bacalja made the two-man final.

- In the first round, Kukoč had 47 while Bacalja also had 47.
- In the second round, Kukoč had 50 (dunked with two balls) while Bacalja had 48. In the third round, Kukoč had 50 (another one-handed dunk from the free-throw line) while Bacalja had 47.

== Overall ==
=== Results ===
Bold: Team that won the game.

| Season | Date | Arena | City | Team | Score | Team | MVP | Topscorer |
|---|---|---|---|---|---|---|---|---|
| 1990-91 | 7 May 1991 | Skenderija Hall | Sarajevo, Bosnia | Red Team | 114 -**125** | **White Team** | (Socialist Federal Republic of Yugoslavia) (Croatia) Toni Kukoc | (Socialist Federal Republic of Yugoslavia) Žarko Paspalj |

=== Three-point contest ===
| Season | Date | Arena | City | Winner | Team | Runner-up | Team |
|---|---|---|---|---|---|---|---|
| 1990-91 | 7 May 1991 | Skenderija Hall | Sarajevo, Bosnia | (Socialist Federal Republic of Yugoslavia) (Croatia) **Arijan Komazec** | (Socialist Federal Republic of Yugoslavia) (Croatia) KK Zadar | (Socialist Federal Republic of Yugoslavia) (Croatia) Danko Cvjetićanin | (Socialist Federal Republic of Yugoslavia) (Croatia) Cibona |

=== Slam-dunk contest ===
| Season | Date | Arena | City | Winner | Team | Runner-up | Team |
|---|---|---|---|---|---|---|---|
| 1990-91 | 7 May 1991 | Skenderija Hall | Sarajevo, Bosnia | (Socialist Federal Republic of Yugoslavia) (Croatia) **Toni Kukoc** | (Socialist Federal Republic of Yugoslavia) (Croatia) Jugoplastika Split | (Socialist Federal Republic of Yugoslavia) (Croatia) Zoran Bacalja | (Socialist Federal Republic of Yugoslavia) (Croatia) Zadar |

== 1992 edition ==
1992 Yu All-Star
| Team Crveni | Team Bijeli |
|---|---|
| - | - |

In the summer of 1991, the biggest names of Yugoslav basketball moved abroad, with Dino Radja, Toni Kukoc and Jure Zdovc moving to Italy despite having NBA offers. The ongoing Yugoslav Wars during the 1991-92 season and the withdrawal of the Croatian teams from the league meant that the second All-Star Game would not take place, while the Yugoslav Basketball Federation (KSJ) was dissolved.

== Distinctions ==
=== FIBA Hall of Fame ===
- (Croatia) Toni Kukoč

=== Basketball Hall of Fame ===
- (Croatia) Toni Kukoč
- (Croatia) Dino Radja

=== FIBA's 50 Greatest Players (1991) ===
- (Croatia) Toni Kukoč
- (Croatia) Dino Radja

== See also ==
- YUBA All-Star Game
- Adriatic Basketball Association All-Star Game

== Sources ==
- 1991 Serbian All-Star Game on eurobasket.com
