= Haris Delalić =

Bosnian basketball player

No. 9 – Igokea m:tel
- Position: Power forward
- League: Bosnian League; ABA League

Personal information
- Born: April 24, 1994 (age 32) Sarajevo, Bosnia and Herzegovina
- Listed height: 2.03 m (6 ft 8 in)

Career information
- Playing career: 2012–present

Career history
- 2012–2015: Bosna
- 2015–2016: Kakanj
- 2016–2017: Bosna
- 2017–2018: Spirou Charleroi
- 2018–2019: Leuven Bears
- 2019–2020: Spirou Charleroi
- 2020–2021: Čelik
- 2021–2022: OKK Sloboda Tuzla
- 2023–2024: Igokea
- 2024: → MZT Skopje
- 2024–2026: Bosna
- 2026–present: Igokea

Career highlights
- Macedonian League champion (2024); Bosnian League champion (2026); Macedonian Cup winner (2024); Bosnian Cup winner (2026)

Haris Delalić (born 24 April 1994) is a Bosnian professional basketball player for Igokea of the Bosnian League and the ABA League.

== Playing career ==
On October 1, 2022, he scored 9 points against Mornar Bar in his debut in the ABA League. On 25 January 2024, Delalić signed a contract with MZT Skopje of the Macedonian League for the 2023–24 season. On January 30, 2024, he debuted for MZT Skopje, scoring 8 points for 25 minutes against Šenčur.
