= Pandža =

Pandža is a surname. Notable people with the surname include:

- Boris Pandža (born 1986), Bosnian football manager and player
- Dalibor Pandža (born 1991), Bosnian footballer
- Josip Pandža (born 1987), Bosnian basketball player
- Katarina Pandza (born 2002), Austrian handball player
