= Draško Prodanović =

Personal information
- Born: January 5, 1947 (age 79) Sarajevo, SR Bosnia and Herzegovina, FNR Yugoslavia
- Coaching career: 1975–2015

Career history
- 1975–1981: Bosna (assistant)
- 1981–1982: Bosna
- 1982–1988: Željezničar Sarajevo
- 1988–1989: Sloboda Tuzla
- 1989–1990: Bosna
- 1990: Yugoslavia (assistant)
- 1991–1993: Morocco
- 1993–1999: Limoges CSP (assistant / interim)
- 2001–2002: Bosna
- 2003–2004: Lukoil Akademik
- 2001–2003: Bosnia and Herzegovina
- 2005–2008: RheinEnergie Köln (assistant)
- 2008–2009: RheinEnergie Köln
- 2010–2011: Virtus Roma (assistant / interim)
- 2011–2012: Maghreb de Fès
- 2014–2015: Istanbul BB

Draško Prodanović (born 5 January 1947) is a retired Bosnian professional basketball coach, known for his extensive career across European club basketball and national teams. He also holds French citizenship and has worked in Bosnia and Herzegovina, France, Germany, Italy, Morocco, Bulgaria and Turkey.

== Coaching career ==
=== Early years and KK Bosna Sarajevo ===
Prodanović began his coaching career in 1975 as an assistant to Bogdan Tanjević at KK Bosna, helping with domestic and European successes including Yugoslav League titles and the EuroLeague in 1979. In 1981 he was promoted to head coach of Bosna, a position he held until 1982.

=== Domestic Yugoslav coaching ===
From 1982 to 1988, Prodanović was head coach of Željezničar Sarajevo. He then had a season working in Tuzla in 1988–89. In 1989–90 he briefly returned to Bosna as head coach. In 1990, he served as assistant coach of the Yugoslavia national team. Between 1991 and 1993 he was head coach of Morocco.

=== France and Limoges CSP ===
In 1993, Prodanović joined Limoges CSP’s coaching staff in France as an assistant coach. He also took interim head coaching duties during the late 1990s. As part of the Limoges staff he won the French League, Cup and FIBA Korać Cup in the 1999–2000 season.

=== Bosnia and Bulgaria ===
He returned to Bosna for the 2001–02 season as head coach, leading the team in domestic competitions and the ABA League. During this period he was also head coach of the Bosnia and Herzegovina national team, leading them at the 2003 EuroBasket tournament in Sweden. In 2003–04 he was head coach of Lukoil Akademik in Bulgaria.

=== Germany and Köln ===
Prodanović joined RheinEnergie Köln in Germany as assistant coach in 2005–06. Working with Saša Obradović, he helped the club win the German Basketball Bundesliga and German Cup. He was promoted to head coach for the 2008–09 season, but was dismissed in March 2009 due to poor results.

=== Italy, Morocco and Turkey ===
In 2010–11, Prodanović served as assistant coach, and briefly interim head coach, at Virtus Roma in Italy's top league. He then coached Maghreb de Fès in Morocco in 2011–12. In December 2014 he was appointed head coach of Turkish side Istanbul BB, a position he held until November 2015.

== Legacy ==
Prodanović is regarded as one of Bosnia and Herzegovina's most experienced coaches, with a career spanning multiple countries and levels of professional basketball. His mentorship has influenced several prominent coaches in Europe, including Mensur Bajramović, Nenad Marković and Saša Obradović.
