= Emir Halimić =

Personal information
- Born: August 10, 1970 (age 56) Sarajevo, SR Bosnia and Herzegovina, SFR Yugoslavia
- Listed height: 1.98 m (6 ft 6 in)

Career information
- Playing career: 1990–2009
- Position: Guard

Career history
- 1990–1993: Bosna
- 1994–1995: Darüşşafaka
- 1995–1996: Tuborg
- 1996: Bosna
- 1996–1998: Tuborg
- 1998–2000: Bosna
- 2000–2001: Kaposvári
- 2001–2002: Le Havre
- 2002–2004: Dombóvár
- 2004: Szolnoki Olajbányász
- 2005–2007: Slavija Sarajevo
- 2008: KK Triland

Emir Halimić (born 10 August 1970) is a Bosnian retired professional basketball player and current coach. He played as a guard for clubs in Bosnia and Herzegovina, Turkey, France and Hungary and represented the Bosnia and Herzegovina national basketball team at the 1993 EuroBasket. After retiring as a player, Halimić pursued a coaching career and is currently serving as head coach of the Bosnia and Herzegovina women's national basketball team.

== Playing career ==
Halimić began his professional career with Bosna in 1990, where he quickly became a key player. Over the course of his playing career, he had multiple stints at Bosna and played abroad in Turkey with Darüşşafaka and Tuborg, in Hungary with Kaposvári, Dombóvár and Szolnoki Olajbányász, and in France with Le Havre. He also played for Slavija Sarajevo and finished his playing career with KK Triland in 2009.

== International ==
Halimić was a member of the Bosnia and Herzegovina national team and competed at the 1993 European Championship for Men, where the team finished in eighth place in its debut at the tournament.

== Coaching career ==
After the end of his playing career, Halimić completed coaching education and transitioned into coaching. In 2008 he was named Sporting director of Slavija Sarajevo. He worked with youth and senior teams in Bosnia and Herzegovina, including time with young national selections. In July 2012 he was appointed coach of KK Bosna Royal. Halimić resigned his post in December of the same year. Halimić was appointed head coach of the Bosnia and Herzegovina women's national basketball team in May 2025, succeeding Drago Karalić.

== Personal life ==
Halimić also contributed to basketball development in Bosnia and Herzegovina by co-founding a basketball school with former teammates Nenad Marković and Gordan Firić after his retirement.
