= Hasan Rizvić =

Personal information
- Born: 18 January 1984 (age 42) Zenica, SR Bosnia and Herzegovina, SFR Yugoslavia
- Listed height: 6 ft 11.5 in (2.12 m)
- Listed weight: 245 lb (111 kg)

Career information
- NBA draft: 2003: undrafted
- Playing career: 2001–2023
- Position: Center

Career history
- 2001–2002: Čelik Zenica
- 2002–2005: Pivovarna Laško
- 2005–2007: Union Olimpija
- 2007: Bosna
- 2007: Śląsk Wrocław
- 2007–2008: Union Olimpija
- 2008–2010: Azovmash
- 2010–2011: UNICS Kazan
- 2011–2012: Azovmash
- 2012: Budućnost Podgorica
- 2012–2013: Enisey Krasnoyarsk
- 2013: Krasny Oktyabr
- 2013–2014: Gamateks Pamukkale Üniversitesi
- 2014–2015: La Bruixa d'Or Manresa
- 2015–2016: Orkide Gediz Üniversitesi
- 2016–2017: Gelişim Koleji
- 2017–2019: Ormanspor
- 2019: Šenčur
- 2019–2020: Bornova Belediyespor
- 2020–2022: Šenčur
- 2022–2023: Triglav Kranj

Career highlights
- EuroCup champion (2011); VTB United League Top Scorer (2010); 2× Slovenian League champion (2006, 2008); 3× Slovenian Cup winner (2004, 2006, 2008); Slovenian Supecup winner (2005); Ukrainian League champion (2009); Ukrainian Cup winner (2009); 3× Slovenian All-Star (2005–2007); Slovenian Supercup MVP (2005)
Medals
Representing Slovenia
FIBA Europe U20 Championship
Gold medal – first place	2004 Brno	National Team

Hasan Rizvić (born 18 January 1984) is a retired professional basketball player. Born in Bosnia, he represented Slovenia internationally.

== Professional career ==
Rizvić began his career playing with KK Čelik but moved to Slovenia when he was 18-years-old where he spent 6 seasons. He later received Slovenian citizenship and started playing for Slovenian junior national teams. He then played two years in the Ukrainian League before joining UNICS Kazan in 2010.

In July 2011 he returned to BC Azovmash, signing a two-year contract. In August 2012 he signed with Enisey Krasnoyarsk in Russia. In August 2013, he signed with Krasny Oktyabr. He was waived on 17 December 2013. On 20 December 2013, he signed with Gamateks Pamukkale Üniversitesi for the rest of the season. In October 2014, he signed with La Bruixa d'Or Manresa for the rest of the season.

On 8 August 2015, he signed with Orkide Gediz Üniversitesi of the Turkish Basketball Second League. In September 2016, he signed with Gelişim Koleji.

== National team ==
As a member of the Slovenian national basketball team he played at the 2010 FIBA World Championship.
