= Josip Pandža =

Personal information
- Born: May 14, 1987 Vitez, SR Bosnia and Herzegovina, SFR Yugoslavia
- Position: Coach
- Coaching career: 2008–present

Career history
- 2008–2012: Vitez
- 2013–2016: Kakanj
- 2015–2016: Bosnia and Herzegovina U16
- 2016–2017: Bosnia and Herzegovina U18
- 2018-2019: Sloboda Tuzla
- 2019-2021: Čelik
- 2021-2023: Budućnost Bijeljina
- 2023: Bosna
- 2023-2024: Šibenka
- 2024-2025: BC Komárno

Josip Pandža (born 14 May 1987) is a Bosnian basketball coach and former player. He is best known for leading the Bosnia and Herzegovina national under-16 team to the gold medal at the 2015 FIBA Europe Under-16 Championship, one of the most significant achievements in the history of the country’s basketball. He has coached several clubs in Bosnia and Herzegovina and abroad, including former EuroLeague winners KK Bosna Royal.

== Early life ==
Pandža was born in Vitez, SR Bosnia and Herzegovina, then part of the Socialist Federal Republic of Yugoslavia. He was involved in basketball from a young age and initially pursued a playing career. Due to health-related reasons, his playing career ended early, after which he transitioned into coaching.

== Coaching career ==
=== Club career ===
Pandža began his coaching career with KK Vitez, where he worked primarily with young players. During the 2013–14 season, he led the club to the A1 League title, securing promotion to the Bosnian Premier League.

In 2013, he was appointed head coach of KK Kakanj. Under his leadership, the club achieved notable results in the top tier of Bosnian basketball, including a run to the finals of the national championship playoffs in 2016.

Pandža later served as head coach of OKK Sloboda Tuzla and KK Čelik, continuing his work within the Bosnian league system.

In June 2023, Pandža was appointed head coach of KK Bosna Royal in Sarajevo. His tenure ended later that year following a series of league defeats.

Pandža has also coached clubs outside Bosnia and Herzegovina, including engagements in Croatia and Slovakia.

=== National teams ===
In 2015, Pandža was appointed head coach of the Bosnia and Herzegovina national under-16 team. At the 2015 FIBA Europe Under-16 Championship in Lithuania, the team won the gold medal.

Following this achievement, Pandža coached Bosnia and Herzegovina at the 2016 FIBA Under-17 Basketball World Cup and later served as head coach of the national under-18 team at European Championship competitions.

== Coaching profile ==
Pandža is known for his emphasis on structured play, defensive discipline, and the development of young players. His coaching work has primarily focused on domestic basketball systems and national youth selections.

== Personal life ==
Pandža was born with a rare anatomical condition involving the inversion of internal organs, which influenced his early retirement from competitive playing and subsequent transition into coaching.

== Honours ==
=== National teams ===
- FIBA Europe Under-16 Championship
  - Champion: 2015 Gold
