= Mirsad Milavić =

Personal information
- Born: 13 October 1948 (age 78) Mostar, PR Bosnia and Herzegovina, FPR Yugoslavia

Career information
- Playing career: 1964–1976

Career history
- 1964–1976: Bosna

Career highlights
- Sixth of April Award, 2009

Mirsad Milavić (born 13 October 1948) is a Bosnian former basketball player, sports administrator, and lawyer. He spent his entire playing career with KK Bosna and later became a club executive and a prominent figure in basketball administration in Bosnia and Herzegovina.

== Early life and education ==
Milavić was born in Mostar and grew up in Sarajevo. He graduated from the Faculty of Law of the University of Sarajevo and later established a private law practice.

== Playing career ==
Milavić began playing for KK Bosna in 1964 and remained with the club throughout his entire playing career. He retired from professional basketball in 1976 after more than a decade with the Sarajevo team.

== Administrative career ==
After retiring as a player, Milavić became involved in sports administration, particularly within KK Bosna, where he later served as general manager.

From 1999 to 2007 he served as president of the Professional Council of the Basketball Federation of Bosnia and Herzegovina. From 2007 to 2012 he was a member of the basketball federation’s governing board.

He has also been active in public discussions about the organization and financial situation of basketball clubs and sports institutions.

== Awards and recognition ==
Milavić is a recipient of the Sixth of April Award, one of the highest honors awarded by the City of Sarajevo for outstanding contributions to society.

== Professional career ==
Outside basketball, Milavić works as a lawyer and runs a private law firm.
