= Aleksandar Damjanović =

Bosnian basketball coach and former player (born 1973)

Personal information
- Born: 15 July 1973 (age 53) Sarajevo, SR Bosnia and Herzegovina, SFR Yugoslavia
- Listed height: 2.06 m (6 ft 9 in)
- Listed weight: 109 kg (240 lb)

Career information
- NBA draft: 1995: undrafted
- Playing career: 1991–2015
- Position: Center / power forward
- Coaching career: 2014–present

Career history

Playing
- –2004: Banjalučka pivara
- 2004–2005: Krka
- 2005–2006: Bosna
- 2008–2009: Slavija
- 2009–2010: Bosna
- 2011–2012: ENAD Ayiou Dometiou
- 2012: E.K. Kavalas
- 2012–2013: Keravnos
- 2013–2014: Radnik Bijeljina
- 2014–2015: Keravnos

Coaching
- 2014–2016: Keravnos (assistant)
- 2016–2017: Bosna (assistant)
- 2017–2018: Bosna
- 2018–2022: Slavija 1996
- 2023–2024: Bosna
- 2025: Bosna

Career highlights
- As player: Bosnian League champion (2006); Bosnian Cup winner (2010); As head coach: ABA League 2 champion (2025); Bosnian Cup winner (2024)

Aleksandar "Aco" Damjanović (Serbian Cyrillic: Александар "Ацо" Дамјановић; born 15 July 1973) is a Bosnian professional basketball coach, administrator and former player.

== Playing career ==
During his professional playing career, Damjanović played for Banjalučka pivara, Bosna, Slavija and Radnik Bijeljina. He also played abroad in Cyprus, Sweden, Slovenia and Greece.

== Coaching career ==
In 2016, Damjanović joined the Bosna staff as an assistant to head coach Dušan Gvozdić. On 10 August 2017, Damjanović was hired to be the head coach of Bosna. On 8 January 2018, he parted ways with Bosna as a head coach and subsequently became the club's sporting director.

== Honours and awards ==
=== Club achievements ===
- Bosna (2005–2006, 2009–2010)
  - Bosnian League champion: (2005–06)
  - Bosnian Cup winner: (2009–10)

=== Coaching honours ===
- Bosna (2023–2024, 2025)
  - ABA League 2 champion: (2024–25)
  - Bosnian Cup winner: (2023–24)
