= Sabahudin Bašović =

Personal information
- Born: Sarajevo, SR Bosnia and Herzegovina, SFR Yugoslavia

Career information
- Playing career: 1973–1985
- Coaching career: 1985–present

Career history

Playing
- 1973–1977: Igman Ilidža (junior)
- 1977–1985: Sarajevo

Coaching
- 1985–1997: Igman Ilidža (youth coach)
- 1997–2005: Sarajevo (youth coach)
- 2005–2010: Bosna (youth coach)
- 2011: Bosna
- 2012: Bosna
- 2014: Bosna
- 2014–2016: Građanski Bijeljina
- 2019: Bosna

Sabahudin Bašović is a Bosnian former basketball player, coach, youth basketball specialist, and sports administrator known for his longstanding involvement in the development of basketball in Bosnia and Herzegovina, particularly at the youth level. He has worked with multiple clubs, most notably former EuroLeague winner KK Bosna, and is regarded for his contributions to talent development and grassroots basketball.

== Early life and playing career ==
Bašović began his basketball career in 1973 with the junior team of Igman Ilidža, competing in youth tournaments in the Sarajevo region. In 1977 he moved to KK Sarajevo, where he played until 1985. During the later phase of his playing career he began transitioning toward coaching and player development.

== Coaching career ==
After retiring as a player, Bašović dedicated himself to coaching, focusing primarily on youth categories. He worked with clubs including Igman and Sarajevo before joining KK Bosna, where he held multiple roles within the club's youth system. With Bosna's junior teams he achieved notable results, including national youth championship titles in the late 1990s.

In subsequent years, he remained active within the structure of KK Bosna, holding various positions related to both the senior team and the club's developmental system. Over the course of the 2000s and 2010s, he served as head coach of Bosna on four separate occasions, the highest number of managerial tenures by any head coach in the club's history. He later returned to full-time youth coaching, overseeing cadet and junior squads while also working as a mentor and instructor in grassroots development initiatives.

== Philosophy and views ==
Throughout his career Bašović has spoken publicly about structural challenges facing basketball in Bosnia and Herzegovina, including insufficient funding, limited opportunities for young players, and the early departure of talented prospects to foreign leagues. He has emphasized the importance of systematic coaching education and stronger institutional support for youth development.

Bašović has consistently advocated a developmental approach prioritizing technical skills, playing time for young athletes, and long-term player growth over short-term competitive results. He has also participated in coaching seminars and training clinics across the Former Yugoslavia.

== Administrative and public activity ==
In addition to coaching, Bašović has been active as a sports administrator and commentator on basketball governance and development. He has publicly addressed issues affecting clubs, youth programs, and the organizational structure of the sport, advocating reforms aimed at strengthening domestic basketball infrastructure.
