= Hamdo Frljak =

Bosnian basketball player and coach

Personal information
- Born: June 11, 1962 Breza, SR Bosnia and Herzegovina, SFR Yugoslavia
- Died: September 19, 2021 (aged 59) Breza, Bosnia and Herzegovina

Career information
- Playing career: 1977–1992
- Coaching career: 1997–2021

Hamdo Frljak (11 June 1962 - 19 September 2021) was a Bosnian professional basketball player and coach. He was known for his long playing career in Bosnia and Herzegovina and later for his successful coaching career, including leading top domestic clubs and working abroad. Frljak is widely remembered as an influential figure in Bosnian basketball.

== Early life and playing career ==
Hamdo Frljak was born in Breza, Bosnia and Herzegovina in 1962. He began playing organized basketball at the age of 15 with KK Breza, his hometown club. He continued his playing career with several Bosnian sides, including Željezničar, Drina Zvornik, Borac from Banja Luka, and Sutjeska from Nikšić. Frljak concluded his playing career with KK Ćeskopromeks Sarajevo, where he subsequently transitioned into coaching.

== Coaching career ==
After retiring as a player, Frljak began his coaching career with his former club Ćeskopromeks Sarajevo. He later took charge of KK Vogošća, leading the club in Bosnia and Herzegovina’s top competitions. In 2002, Frljak was appointed head coach of KK Bosna, one of the country’s most prestigious basketball clubs, guiding them domestically and in the ABA League. He would coach Bosna again in the 2011-2012 season.

Frljak’s coaching career also included stints abroad. He worked in Saudi Arabia with Ohod Medina and in the United Arab Emirates before returning to Bosnia. He coached in Bahrain with Al Nuwaidrat and again with Vogošća upon his return home. In the later stages of his career, Frljak coached Promo Donji Vakuf.

== Death ==
Hamdo Frljak died on 19 September 2021 at the age of 59. His passing was widely reported in Bosnia and Herzegovina and mourned by the local basketball community.
