= Aleksandar Avlijaš =

Personal information
- Born: July 1, 1972 (age 54) Sarajevo, SR Bosnia and Herzegovina, SFR Yugoslavia
- Listed height: 199 cm (6 ft 6 in)

Career information
- Playing career: 1988–2005
- Position: Shooting guard / Small forward

Career history
- 1988–1992: Bosna
- 1992–1993: Metalac Valjevo
- 1993–1994: UBC Münster
- 1994–1995: Jedinstvo Bijelo Polje
- 1995–1997: OKK Beograd
- 1997–1999: Radnički Beograd
- 1999–2000: Hapoel Haifa
- 2000–2001: Śląsk Wrocław
- 2001–2002: BC Avtodor
- 2002: Lovćen
- 2002-2003: Oliveirense
- 2003: Vojvodina
- 2003-2004: Türk Telekom
- 2004-2005: Maccabi Petah Tikva
- 2005: Turów Zgorzelec
- 2005-2006: CSU Ploiești
- 2006-2007: Kotwica Kołobrzeg
- 2007: CSU Ploiești

Aleksandar Avlijaš (born 1 July 1972) is a Bosnian-Serbian retired professional basketball player. He played primarily as a guard and small forward during a career that spanned the late 1980s to the mid-2000s, competing for several clubs in the former Yugoslavia, Germany, and other European leagues. Avlijaš also represented Yugoslavia at youth international level.

== Early life ==
Avlijaš was born on 1 July 1972 in Sarajevo, then part of the Socialist Federal Republic of Yugoslavia. He began playing basketball in Sarajevo as a youth and was part of the junior and cadet teams of KK Bosna, achieving notable success at youth levels in Bosnia and Herzegovina. His early development with Bosna laid the foundation for his professional career.

== Club career ==
Avlijaš made his first senior appearance with Bosna in the 1988–89 season, initially playing sparingly before gaining more experience in subsequent campaigns. During his time with Bosna, he played both in the domestic league and had dual licensing stints with Borac Čapljina, being part of the Bosna squad that reached the semifinals of the FIBA Korać Cup. Injuries in the early 1990s, compounded by the outbreak of conflict in Bosnia and Herzegovina, influenced his move to Serbia in 1992.

In 1992–93, Avlijaš joined Metalac Valjevo before moving to Germany to play with UBC Münster for the 1993–94 season. He then returned to FR Yugoslavia with Jedinstvo Bijelo Polje for the 1994–95 season and subsequently OKK Beograd (1995–97), where he became one of the leading scorers in the team. He later played for Radnički Beograd from 1997 to 1999, and finished his career in various European leagues from 1999 to 2005, including stints in Israel, Poland, Portugal, and other competitions.

== International career ==
Avlijaš represented Yugoslavia at youth level, appearing at the 1989 FIBA Europe Under-16 Championship.

== Style of play ==
Avlijaš was known for his versatility as both a guard and small forward, with the ability to handle scoring, playmaking, and defensive duties. His scoring pace and experience across different European leagues helped him maintain a long professional career.
