= Admir Bukva =

Bosnian former basketball player

Personal information
- Born: March 14, 1974 (age 52) Sarajevo, SR Bosnia and Herzegovina, SFR Yugoslavia
- Listed height: 207 cm (6 ft 9 in)

Career information
- Playing career: 1992–2008
- Position: Power forward

Career history
- 1992–2008: Bosna

Career highlights
- 2× Bosnian League champion (1998, 2005)

Admir Bukva (born 14 March 1974) is a Bosnian former professional basketball player and sports administrator. He is best known for his long playing career with Bosna, where he served as team captain and won multiple domestic league titles, and for his later roles in basketball management.

== Playing career ==
Bukva spent the entirety of his professional playing career with Bosna, former EuroLeague champion and one of the most successful clubs in Bosnia and Herzegovina. He was part of the Bosna teams that won the Bosnian League in 1998 and 2005, and he served as the team’s captain during his tenure.

At the senior international level, Bukva also represented the Bosnia and Herzegovina national basketball team, appearing at EuroBasket 1997.

== Post-playing career ==
After retiring as a player, Bukva remained involved in basketball, working in administrative and leadership roles. He served as director of KK Bosna, leading the club’s sporting and operational affairs. He received a bachelor’s degree in Sports Studies from the Faculty of Sport and Physical Education at the University of Sarajevo in 2007, and later earned a master’s degree in Economics from the Faculty of Management and Business Economics at the University of Sarajevo in 2012.

In June 2025, Bukva was appointed general director of ZOI’84 d.o.o, a public company responsible for managing former 1984 Winter Olympics facilities. His appointment was welcomed by the organization’s leadership, which cited his experience and dedication to sport and community development.

Beyond basketball administration, Bukva has worked in career development and business consulting, including positions as director of a career development centre at the American University in Bosnia and Herzegovina and as a consultant in the insurance sector.

== Political career ==
Bukva is a member of Our Party, a social-liberal and multi-ethnic political party in Bosnia and Herzegovina. He was a candidate for mayor of the Centar Municipality of Sarajevo in the October 2016 local elections.
