= Goran Ikonić =

Bosnian basketball player

Personal information
- Born: March 23, 1980 (age 46) Zvornik, SFR Yugoslavia
- Listed height: 6 ft 5 in (1.96 m)
- Listed weight: 200 lb (91 kg)

Career information
- Playing career: 1998–2020
- Position: Shooting guard

Career history
- 1998–2001: Drina Zvornik
- 2001–2003: Rogla
- 2003: Rudar Ugljevik
- 2003–2005: Leotar Trebinje
- 2005–2009: Bosna
- 2009–2010: Donetsk
- 2010–2011: Krka
- 2011–2012: Pınar Karşıyaka
- 2012–2013: Politekhnika-Halychyna
- 2014: Rabotnički
- 2014–2015: Steaua București
- 2015–2016: BBC Monthey
- 2016–2017: Bosna Royal
- 2019–2020: Vevey Riviera

Career highlights
- EuroChallenge champion (2011); EuroChallenge Finals MVP (2011); Slovenian League champion (2011); Slovenian Supercup winner (2010); 2× Bosnian League champion (2006, 2008); Bosnian Cup winner (2009)

Goran Ikonić (born March 23, 1980) is a Bosnian former professional basketball player. He played at the shooting guard position.
