= Josip Lovrić =

Bosnian-Herzegovinian basketball player

retired player
- Position: Center

Personal information
- Born: September 13, 1968 (age 58) Split, SFR Yugoslavia
- Listed height: 7 ft 0 in (2.13 m)
- Listed weight: 264 lb (120 kg)

Career history
- 1988–1990: Split
- 1990–1991: Budućnost Podgorica
- 1991–1993: Split
- 1994–1995: Trier
- 1995–1997: Telecomp Vinkovci
- 1997–1998: Helios Domžale
- 1998: Slovakofarma Pezinok
- 1998–1999: Bosna
- 1999–2000: Rabotnički
- 2000–2003: HKK Brotnjo Čitluk

Josip Lovrić (born September 13, 1968) was a Bosnian-Herzegovinian professional basketball player who last played for HKK Brotnjo Čitluk.
