= Milenko Novaković =

Personal information
- Born: 10 April 1929 Banja Luka, Kingdom of Yugoslavia

Career history

Playing
- 1950–1955: Partizan

Coaching
- 1957–1959: Mladi Krajišnik
- 1959–1963: Borac
- 1963–1964: Partizan
- 1964–1971: Bosna
- 1971–1977: Yugoslavia U18 (assistant)

Milenko Novaković (Serbian Cyrillic: Миленко Новаковић; born 10 April 1929) is a former Yugoslav basketball player and coach. He was part of the generation that contributed to the development of basketball in the former Yugoslavia both as a player and later as a coach.

== Playing career ==
Novaković played club basketball for Partizan during the early period of the club’s history. He was also a member of the Yugoslavia national team during his playing career, competing at the 1950 FIBA World Championship.

== Coaching career ==
After retiring as a player, Novaković began a coaching career. He served as head coach of Partizan during the 1960s.

From 1963 to 1971, he was the head coach of KK Bosna in Sarajevo, playing an important role in the club’s early development and in the growth of basketball in Bosnia and Herzegovina.

== Legacy ==
Novaković is regarded as one of the figures involved in the formative years of Yugoslav basketball, contributing to the sport both on the court and from the bench. An annual tournament is held in Banja Luka in his honor, as well as in honor of Milan Tošić and Aleksandar Jurić.
