= Senad Redžić =

Career information
- Playing career: 1988–1997
- Coaching career: 1997–present

Career history

Playing
- 1988–1997: KK Sarajevo

Coaching
- 1997–2002: KK Sarajevo (youth)
- 2002–2006: KK Sarajevo
- 2006–2008: Bosnia and Herzegovina U18 (assistant)
- 2009–2014: Spars
- 2015–2016: Bosna
- 2016–2018: Bosna (youth director)
- 2018–2023: Ilidža
- 2023–: MVP

Senad Redžić is a Bosnian former basketball player and coach, known for his extensive work in player development and coaching in Bosnia and Herzegovina, especially with KK Bosna and youth programs.

== Coaching career ==
Redžić has held various coaching roles throughout his career. He has worked extensively with youth teams, senior teams, and developmental programs in both club and national team selections.

In June 2015 Redžić was appointed head coach of former EuroLeague winner KK Bosna Royal. During his tenure as head coach, he was noted for emphasizing disciplined play and development within a largely young roster.

In March 2016 Redžić transitioned into a strategic developmental role when he was named the head of youth selections at Bosna, where he oversaw the organization of the club's youth programs and contributed to the training and mentor‑ship of both coaches and young players. His coaching career also includes positions with OKK Spars and other youth initiatives before and after his Bosna tenure.

In 2018 Redžić joined the coaching staff of KK Ilidža and BBY as an assistant coach, where he was credited with bringing years of experience in training young players and contributing to the club's coaching philosophy.
