= Damir Abdulkerim Mirković =

Damir Mirković
Personal information
- Born: January 6, 1977 (age 49) Sarajevo, SR Bosnia and Herzegovina, SFR Yugoslavia
- Listed height: 195 cm (6 ft 5 in)

Career information
- Playing career: 1995–2005
- Position: Guard

Career history
- 1995–2001: Bosna
- 2001–2002: Maccabi Rishon LeZion
- 2002–2003: BBV Hagen

Career highlights
- Bosnian Championship (1998-99)

Damir Abdulkerim Mirković (born 6 January 1977) is a Bosnian retired professional basketball player who played as a guard. He was a leading member of the Bosna squad during their successful period in the late 1990s and represented the Bosnia and Herzegovina national basketball team at international tournaments.

== Club career ==
Mirković rose to prominence with Bosna, one of Bosnia and Herzegovina's most successful clubs, where he played from the mid-1990s into the early 2000s. He featured for Bosna in European club competitions such as the Saporta Cup, posting strong performances in both the 1999 and 2000 editions of the tournament.

After his tenure with Bosna, Mirković had spells abroad, including with Israeli side Maccabi Rishon LeZion and German club BBV Hagen, before retiring from professional basketball in the mid-2000s.

== International career ==
Mirković was a regular member of the Bosnia and Herzegovina national basketball team during the late 1990s and early 2000s. He represented his country at EuroBasket 1999 in France and also appeared in EuroBasket 2001 Turkey, contributing as a guard throughout both tournaments.

== Post-playing career ==
After retiring from professional basketball, Mirković devoted himself to grassroots basketball development and community initiatives, focusing on youth training programs and local sports promotion. He was a long-standing member of Bosna's steering committee.

== Personal life ==
Mirković converted to Islam and adopted the name Abdulkerim, a decision he has described as the result of a personal spiritual process and reflection on his beliefs.

== Legacy ==
Mirković is regarded as one of the key figures in Bosna's resurgence following the breakup of Yugoslavia, playing an important role in both domestic league and European competition during his career. His contributions at club and international level have made him a notable figure in Bosnian basketball history.
