= Mensur Bajramović =

Bosnian basketball player and coach (born 1965)

Winling
- Position: Head coach
- League: Hong Kong A1 Division Championship

Personal information
- Born: 15 August 1965 (age 61) Sarajevo, SR Bosnia and Herzegovina, SFR Yugoslavia
- Coaching career: 1998–present

Career history

Playing
- Čelik
- Bosna
- KK Triglav Osiguranje

Coaching
- 1998–1999: Čelik
- 1999–2002: Čelik (assistant)
- 2001: Bosnia and Herzegovina (assistant)
- 2003–2007: Bosna
- 2004–2005: Bosnia and Herzegovina
- 2008–2010: Bosnia and Herzegovina
- 2008–2010: Al–Jalaa Aleppo
- 2011: Syria
- 2012–2014: Al–Qadsiah
- 2014: Kuwait
- 2015–2016: OKK Spars Sarajevo
- 2017: Saudi Arabia
- 2017: Byblos Club
- 2017–2018: Bosnia and Herzegovina (assistant)
- 2018–2021: South China
- 2022–2023: Al Nassr BC
- 2023–2026: Hong Kong Eastern
- 2026–present: Winling

Career highlights
- As coach: 2× Hong Kong League champion (2024, 2026); Bosnian League champion (2005); 2× Bosnian Coach of the Year (2004, 2005)

Mensur Bajramović (born 15 August 1965) is a Bosnian professional basketball coach. He currently serves as the head coach of the Winling.

In earlier years, he coached the Bosnia and Herzegovina national basketball team.
