= Aleksandar Glintić =

Serbian basketball player

Personal information
- Born: April 19, 1976 (age 50) Travnik, SR Bosnia and Herzegovina, SFR Yugoslavia
- Listed height: 2.08 m (6 ft 10 in)
- Listed weight: 107 kg (236 lb)

Career information
- NBA draft: 1998: undrafted
- Playing career: 1991–2009
- Position: Center
- Number: 9, 11

Career history
- 1991–1992: Bosna
- 1992–1994: Partizan
- 1994–1997: Beovuk 72
- 1997–2000: Beobanka
- 2000–2002: Partizan
- 2002–2003: OKK Beograd
- 2004: Lukoil Academic
- 2005: Igokea
- 2005: Iraklis Thessaloniki
- 2007–2008: Vizura
- 2008–2009: U-Mobitelco Cluj-Napoca
Medals
Men's basketball
Representing FR Yugoslavia
'22 & under' European Championship
| Gold medal – first place | 1998 Italy | Team |
'22 & under' World Championship
| Bronze medal – third place | 1997 Australia | Team |
Mediterranean Games
| Bronze medal – third place | 1997 Bari | Team |

Aleksandar Glintić (Serbian Cyrillic: Александар Глинтић; born April 19, 1976) is a Serbian former professional basketball player.

== Playing career ==
Glintić played for the youth system of Bosna and got promoted to the first team in 1991. Before the Bosnian War, he moved to Belgrade in 1992. In 1992, he signed for Partizan where he stayed for two seasons without a lot of opportunity to play. After leaving Partizan, he played for Belgrade-based teams Beovuk 72 and Beobanka. In the summer 2000, he returned to Partizan. He played for two seasons and won a Yugoslav League and a Yugoslav Basketball Cup in 2002.

After leaving Partizan, he played one season for OKK Beograd. In 2003, he signed a one-year deal with the Bulgarian team Lukoil Academic. In February 2005, he signed the contract with Igokea for the rest of the season. In August 2005, he signed a contract with Greek team Iraklis Thessaloniki, but left them at the end of October. In January 2007, he returned to Serbia and signed for Vizura, where he played for a year and a half. His last season he played for in the Romanian team U-Mobitelco Cluj-Napoca.

== International career ==
Glintić was a member of the FR Yugoslavia national under-22 team that won the gold medal at the 1997 World Championship for 22 and Under in Australia. Over seven tournament games, he averaged 9.0 points, 5.9 rebounds and 0.3 assists per game. Also, he won the bronze medal at the 1998 European Championship for 22 and Under in Italy. Over eight tournament games, he averaged 6.8 points, 4.2 rebounds and 0.2 assists per game.

Glintić won the bronze medal at the 1997 Mediterranean Games in Bari, Italy.

== Career achievements and awards ==
=== Club ===
- Yugoslav League champion: 1 (with Partizan: 2001–02)
- Yugoslav Basketball Cup winner: 2 (with Partizan: 1993–94, 2001–02)

=== National team ===
- 1997 World Championship for 22 and Under: Bronze
- 1997 Mediterranean Games: Bronze
- 1998 European Championship for 22 and Under: Gold
