= Mario Primorac =

Bosnian-Herzegovinian baseball player

Personal information
- Born: 3 November 1961 (age 65) Zavidovići, PR Bosnia-Herzegovina, FPR Yugoslavia
- Listed height: 204 cm (6 ft 8 in)
- Listed weight: 99 kg (218 lb)

Career information
- Playing career: 1980–2001
- Positions: center, wing-center
- Coaching career: 2001–?

Career history

Playing
- ?–1982: KK Borac Čapljina
- 1982–1992: Bosna
- 1992–1994: Alba Berlin
- 1994–1995: KK Kvarner
- 1995–1998: Oberwart Gunners
- 1998–1999: Satex
- 1999–2001: Zagorje

Coaching
- ?: Škola košarke Mario Primorac; Branik-Primorac

Career highlights
- 1982–83 First Federal Basketball League with KK Bosna; 1983-84 Yugoslav Basketball Cup with KK Bosna; Austrian Basketball Cup 1998-99 with Oberwart Gunners; EuroBasket 1989 with Yugoslavia in Zagreb
Medals
Representing Yugoslavia
Basketball
FIBA EuroBasket
Gold medal – first place	1989 Yugoslavia	National Team

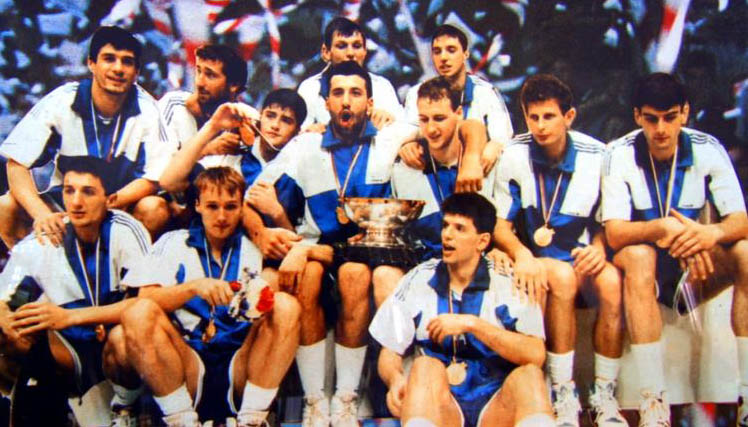
Primorac was part of the Yugoslavia national basketball team who won the 1989 FIBA EuroBasket which was held in Yugoslavia.

Mario Primorac (born 3 November 1961, Zavidovići, Bosnia and Herzegovina) is a former Bosnian-Herzegovinian basketball player, who works as a coach.

== Club career ==
He was born in Zavidovići, Bosnia and Herzegovina. His family lived in Žepče. His father was a railway worker, so as a small child he moved to Ploče, and then to Čapljina where he went to school. He started playing basketball relatively late, only in the second grade of high school. Jasmin Repeša persuaded him to train. Ivica Obad, Drago Raguž, Dražen Blažević and others were same generation and trained with him at the time. Here he started his career with KK Borac Čapljina at senior level.

He later played for KK Bosna Sarajevo for a decade. In 1983/84 with Bosna he was 4th at the European Champions Cup, in the roster: Sabahudin Bilalović, Žarko Varajić, Sabit Hadžić, Predrag Benaček, Emir Mutapčić, Boro Vučević, Mario Primorac, Dragan Lukenda, Anto Đogić, Miroljub Mitrović, and the coach was Svetislav Pešić. Then he went abroad. He played in Germany, Austria and Slovenia for Alba Berlin, Oberwart Gunners, Satex and Zagorje. He ended his playing career at the age of 40. He stayed in basketball as a coach. He was first in the project of his private basketball school Mario Primorac in Maribor. For a long time he led his club, which later merged with Maribor's Branik and was called Branik-Primorac, where he was director and coach. They achieved good results. The seniors played in a strong Slovenian second league. With the juniors they went even further and won the title of champion of Slovenia. In the summer of 2013, he led the Lithuanian club Dzuki from Alytus, but due to disagreements with the home players, he left the club. He returned to his homeland to coach HKK Čapljina. He did not stay long, but not through his own fault, as the club had financial problems.

=== National Team career ===
He has been a member of the national team for many years. He played in EuroBasket 1989 for Yugoslavia, for Bosnia national basketball team in EuroBasket 1993 and in the qualifications for the EuroBasket 1995.
