= Anto Đogić =

Yugoslav basketball player

Personal information
- Born: 18 April 1952 (age 74) Sarajevo, PR Bosnia and Herzegovina, Yugoslavia

Career information
- NBA draft: 1974: undrafted
- Number: 5

Career history
- Bosna

Career highlights
- EuroLeague champion (1979)
Medals
Men's basketball
Representing Yugoslavia
EuroBasket
| Gold medal – first place | 1977 Belgium |

Anto Đogić (born 18 April 1952) is a Bosnian former professional basketball player.

== Playing career ==
During his professional career, Đogić played most notably for Bosna.

== National team career ==
Đogić won the gold medal with the Yugoslav national team at the 1977 EuroBasket in Belgium where he was coached by Aleksandar Nikolić.

== Footers ==
Notes

1. His name is often misspelled as Ante Đogić.
