= KK Bosna Royal =

Coordinates: 43°51′26.5″N 18°24′44″E

Bosna BH Telecom
- Nickname: Studenti (Students); Bordo-bijeli (Maroon-whites)
- Leagues: Bosnian League; ABA League; EuroCup
- Founded: 1951; 75 years ago
- History: KK Bosna (1951–2014); KK Bosna Royal (2014–present)
- Arena: Mirza Delibašić Hall (capacity: 6,500); Zetra Olympic Hall (capacity: 12,000)
- Location: Sarajevo, Bosnia and Herzegovina
- Team colors: Maroon, white
- Main sponsor: BH Telecom
- President: Nihad Selimović
- General manager: Mehmed Jahić
- Team manager: Mujo Tuljković
- Head coach: Dario Gjergja
- Team captain: Edin Atić
- Championships: 1 EuroLeague; 5 Bosnian Championships; 5 Bosnian Cups; 3 Yugoslav Championships; 2 Yugoslav Cups; 1 ABA 2nd League
- Website: kkbosna.ba
| Home | Away |

Košarkaški klub Bosna (transl. Basketball Club Bosna), also referred to as KK Bosna Royal, currently named Bosna BH Telecom for sponsorship reasons, is a professional basketball club based in Sarajevo, Bosnia and Herzegovina. It is the most successful Bosnian club of all time, having been the European champion by winning the 1978–79 FIBA European Champions Cup. The club has won three Yugoslav Championships, two Yugoslav Cups, five Bosnian Championships, and five Bosnian Cups, making it one of the most decorated basketball clubs in the region. The club currently competes in the Basketball Championship of Bosnia and Herzegovina, the ABA League, and the EuroCup. The club is a founding member and shareholder of the Adriatic Basketball Association. It is part of the University Sport Society Bosna (Bosnian: Univerzitetsko sportsko društvo Bosna).

Throughout the 1970s, 1980s, and early 1990s, Bosna was considered part of the so-called "Big Five" of Yugoslav basketball, alongside Partizan, Cibona, Jugoplastika, and Red Star Belgrade. The club's nicknames are The Students and Maroon-Whites. Its official colours are maroon and white, with gold occasionally used as a third colour. The club's official anthem is "Igraj Bosno" by the Bosnian alternative rock band Skroz.

== History ==
=== 1951–1955: Formation and early years ===
KK Bosna was founded in 1951 in Sarajevo as the basketball section of the University Sports Society Bosna (Bosnian: Univerzitetsko sportsko društvo Bosna), established to organize competitive sport among students of the University of Sarajevo. The initiative to form the club came from university students and sports enthusiasts seeking to develop organized basketball in post-war Sarajevo, at a time when the sport was still in its early stages of growth in the Socialist Republic of Bosnia and Herzegovina, then part of the Federal People’s Republic of Yugoslavia.

The club’s first chairman and head coach was Dr. Nedžad Brkić, who played a central organizational and sporting role during the formative years. In keeping with its university character, the roster was composed predominantly of students enrolled at the University of Sarajevo, which gave the club an amateur and developmental profile in its early phase. Training sessions and matches were held in modest conditions, often in shared gymnasiums, reflecting the limited sports infrastructure available in Sarajevo in the early 1950s. During its first four seasons, Bosna competed in the Sarajevo city league, which at the time represented the lowest organized tier of competition in the regional basketball system. Despite limited resources, the team gradually established itself as one of the stronger sides in the city competition. In 1955, Bosna won the Sarajevo city league championship, securing promotion to the League of the Socialist Republic of Bosnia and Herzegovina, a higher regional tier within the Yugoslav basketball pyramid.

The squad in these early years featured players such as Brkić, Marušić, Takač, Bise, Bjelica, Cindrić, Bilić, Đurasković, Fetahagić, Uzelac, Džapa, Pilav, Hofbauer, Lovrenović, Beganović and Dimitrijević. This generation laid the organizational and competitive foundations for the club’s later rise within the Yugoslav league system.

=== 1955–1972: Attempting to reach top-tier Yugoslav First League ===
Following promotion from the Sarajevo city league in 1955, Bosna spent the next 17 seasons competing in the First League of the Socialist Republic of Bosnia and Herzegovina, which functioned as a republic-level tier within the broader Yugoslav basketball system. During this period, the club gradually evolved from a university-based side into an ambitious and increasingly professional organization, with the clear objective of reaching the Yugoslav First Federal League, the highest level of basketball in the country. Throughout the late 1950s and 1960s, Bosna steadily strengthened its organizational structure and youth development, while also beginning to attract talented players from across Bosnia and Herzegovina and, eventually, from other Yugoslav republics. This strategy intensified in the late 1960s, when the club leadership made a conscious effort to recruit promising young players with national-level potential.

One of the key figures of this era was coach Bogdan Tanjević, who took over the senior team in the late 1960s. Tanjević, himself a young and tactically innovative coach, built a modern, fast-paced team centered on discipline and collective play. Under his leadership, Bosna increasingly became a destination for talented prospects. Among the most notable additions was Svetislav Pešić, who joined Bosna as a young player in the late 1960s and was part of the squad that achieved promotion in 1972. Pešić would later go on to become one of Europe’s most successful coaches, but his formative senior playing years were spent in Sarajevo during Bosna’s rise to the top flight. Another crucial development came shortly after promotion, when in 1972 Bosna brought in the highly talented Mirza Delibašić from Tuzla. Delibašić, then still a teenager, would become the central figure of the club’s golden generation and one of the greatest players in Yugoslav and European basketball history. Around the same period, Bosna also secured the arrival of Ratko Radovanović, another center who would later become a Yugoslav international and one of the leading men of his generation. Together with homegrown and recruited talents such as Žarko Varajić, these players formed the nucleus of a team that would soon achieve continental success.

On 28 April 1972, Bosna faced cross-town rivals KK Željezničar Sarajevo in a decisive match that would determine promotion to the Yugoslav First League. The game, played in front of a packed Sarajevo crowd, carried enormous sporting and symbolic weight. A victory would finally secure Bosna’s long-awaited entry into the top tier of Yugoslav basketball. Led by coach Bogdan Tanjević, Bosna fielded a squad that included Jovo Terzić, Mirsad Milavić, Zdravko Čečur, Milan Pavlić, Aleksandar Nadaždin, Dumić, Bruno Soče, Žarko Varajić, Slobodan Pejović, Svetislav Pešić, Rođeni Krvavac, and Anto Đogić. Bosna won the match, clinching promotion and marking the culmination of 17 years of effort in the republic league.

In subsequent decades, the 1972 promotion match against Željezničar acquired near-mythical status in Sarajevo sporting culture. The encounter came to symbolize the broader social and sporting identities within the city. Bosna, wearing its distinctive maroon colours, increasingly became associated with FK Sarajevo, whose own team colours were also maroon and white. Meanwhile, Željezničar, as part of the Željezničar sports society that also included FK Željezničar Sarajevo, drew support from fans aligned with that club. The rivalry was relatively short lived because after being demoted in 1976, Željezničar never faced Bosna in a league fixture again.

=== 1972–1984: The glory years ===
KK Bosna winning the 1978–79 FIBA European Champions Cup.

The future European championship winning roster was completed with the arrival of legendary Mirza Delibašić in 1972. The first 6 seasons in the Yugoslav First League represented a coming of age process, with the team eventually going on to win its first title in 1978, led by star players Ratko Radovanović, Žarko Varajić and Mirza Delibašić. A year later KK Bosna became the first team, aside from CSKA Moscow, to win the European championship without a single foreign player on its roster. Namely, on 5 April 1979 the team, led by the late Delibašić and game MVP Varajić, defeated Italian Powerhouse Emerson Varese 96-93. The club started its EuroLeague season in the Quarterfinal group stage, finishing first in its group. Once in the Semifinals, the side sent a message to contenders by edging the defending champions Real Madrid 114:109 in overtime, in Sarajevo. KK Bosna would eventually win all of its home games and would advance to the title game by edging Greek side Olympiacos 83–88, in Piraeus. Bosna's opponent in the final would either be Emerson Varese or Real Madrid, who faced each other off in the final game of the round. The Italian side beat Madrid 82-83. The aforementioned game will be remembered for Prada's misses: Namely, Luis Maria Prada famously missed 3 consecutive free throws with no time on the clock, forever changing European basketball history. Once in the title game, KK Bosna downed mighty Emerson Varese 96:93 in front of 15,000 fans in the Palais des Sports, Grenoble, France. Varajić led the team in scoring with 45 points, while Delibašić followed with 30. The former is still the record holder for most points in a Euroleague final. Radovanović added 10 more points, while Americans Bob Morse and Charlie Yelverton scored 30 and 27 points respectively for Varese.

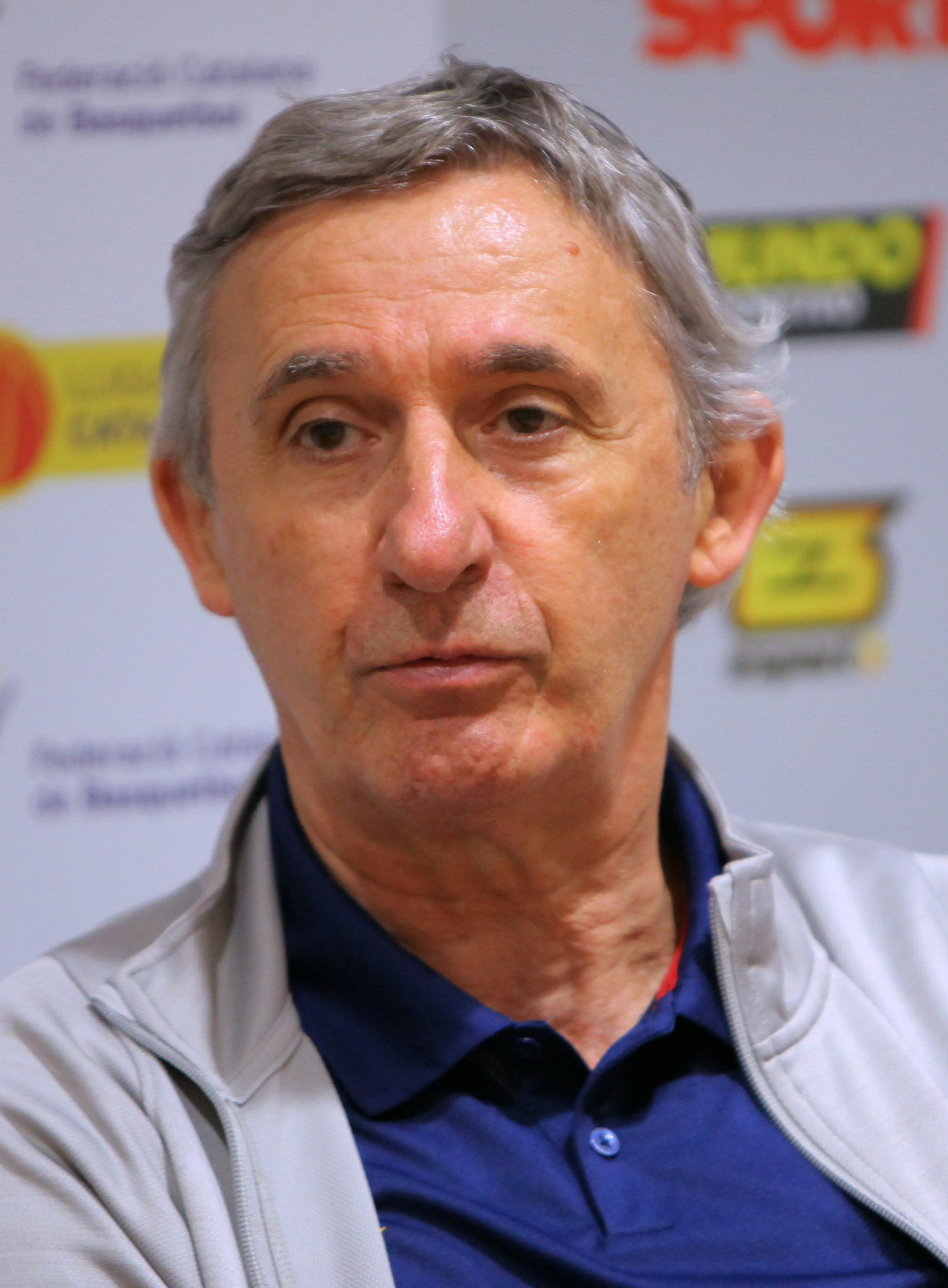
Svetislav Pešić served the club in multiple capacities during the 1970s and 1980s - first as a player, and later as both managing director and head coach.

In the next four seasons KK Bosna would go on to win two more Yugoslav championships (1979-80; 1982-83), as well as a silver medal in the 1980 FIBA Intercontinental Cup, which it hosted. In the 1982–83 season, Šibenka defeated Bosna 83–82 in the deciding game of the playoff final after 18‑year‑old Dražen Petrović hit two free throws in the final seconds to secure the victory on the court. However, the decision proved controversial because the foul called on Bosna’s Sabit Hadžić, which led to the free throws, was adjudged by referee Ilija Matijević to have occurred after regulation time had already expired. The Basketball Federation of Yugoslavia reviewed the game the following morning and, citing irregularities in officiating and the timing of the call, annulled the result and ordered a replay of the match at a neutral venue in Novi Sad. Šibenka refused to participate in the rematch, effectively boycotting the replay, and as a result the championship title was awarded administratively to Bosna. The referee Matijević was subsequently banned from basketball for life in connection with the incident, and the original Šibenka squad did not return their championship medals. A second Yugoslav Cup triumf followed a year later. In the 1983–84 season, the team finished fourth in the European Cup.

The squad included Sabahudin Bilalović, Žarko Varajić, Sabit Hadžić, Predrag Benaček, Emir Mutapčić, Boro Vučević, Mario Primorac, Dragan Lukenda, Anto Đogić, and Miroljub Mitrović, with Svetislav Pešić as head coach. Although the team won every home game that season, including victories over major European clubs such as Barcelona, Maccabi, Virtus Roma, and Limoges, their failure to qualify for the final was ultimately sealed by an away defeat to Limoges in the penultimate round. Limoges had already been eliminated from contention for the final, and this was only their second win in ten matches, finishing last overall. Bosna had a final opportunity to reach the final in an away match against Banco di Roma (Virtus), in a direct duel that decided the second finalist. The score was tied 30–30 at halftime, but the match ended in a 66–55 victory for Banco di Roma.

=== 1984–1992: Pre‑war years ===
KK Bosna 1984-85 team photo.

After nearly a decade of continuous success, most of the star players transferred abroad in the mid‑1980s. Namely, Mirza Delibašić, Žarko Varajić, Ratko Radovanović and Anto Đogić, along with coach Bogdan Tanjević, moved to foreign clubs, with Tanjević taking over at Italian club Juventus Caserta. After retiring prematurely, Delibašić later served as coach of Bosna on several occasions in the late 1980s and early 1990s. In the 1989–90 season, Bosna competed in the FIBA Korać Cup, one of Europe’s continental club competitions, advancing through multiple rounds and recording a strong 10–3–1 record in five successive stages of the tournament, ultimately reaching the semifinals of the competition after rolling past Efes Pilsen in the quarterfinals. During the 1991–92 season, Bosna again participated in the FIBA Korać Cup, achieving a record of 2 wins, 1 defeat, and 1 draw across two rounds before the club’s campaign ended. In 1991 Bosna hosted the first Yugoslav Basketball All-Star Game in Sarajevo.

In the final season before the outbreak of the Bosnian War, Bosna reached the final of the 1991–92 Yugoslav Cup, losing 105-79 to Partizan in Niš, with Partizan going on to win the Euroleague title that same year. The outbreak of hostilities in 1992 abruptly curtailed the progress of this new generation, scattering players and staff and bringing top‑level competition in the country to an end. Notable players during the final seasons of Yugoslav competition prior to the outbreak of war included Zdravko Radulović, Mario Primorac, Miroljub Mitrović, Nenad Marković, Dževad Alihodžić, Samir Avdić, Gordan Firić, Samir Mujanović, Aleksandar Glintić, Emir Halimić and Aleksandar Avlijaš.

=== 1992–1997: Hardest of times ===
Team photo of the 1998-99 team, which secured the club’s first league title in independent Bosnia and Herzegovina.

With the outbreak of the Bosnian War in April 1992 and the beginning of the Siege of Sarajevo, organized basketball competitions in Bosnia and Herzegovina were effectively suspended for several seasons. KK Bosna, like most sports institutions in the capital, was forced to halt regular competitive activity, while its infrastructure and financial base were severely affected by wartime conditions.

A talented generation of players on the verge of establishing the club once again at the top of Yugoslav and European basketball dispersed abroad. Among them, Nenad Marković continued his professional career in Italy with Stefanel Trieste, while other first-team players, including Samir Avdić and Gordan Firić, moved to clubs in Spain, Italy and Turkey. Furthermore, players such as Aleksandar Avlijaš, Gavrilo Pajović and Aleksandar Glintić moved to Serbian clubs, while others such as Dževad Alihodžić moved to Croatian ones, respectively. The departures deprived Bosna of its competitive core and reduced the club to basic survival in organizational terms.

Despite the siege and extremely difficult living conditions in Sarajevo, basketball activity did not completely cease. In 1993, under the leadership of veteran coach Ante Đogić and his assistant Mladen Jojić, a group of young players who had remained in the city continued to train and participate in improvised competitions organized within the besieged capital. Training sessions were often held in makeshift conditions, without adequate equipment or heating, symbolizing the broader effort of Sarajevo’s sports community to preserve institutional continuity during the war.

Following the signing of the Dayton Agreement in late 1995 and the gradual normalization of life, organized league basketball resumed. In the 1997–98 season, a playoff competition for clubs from the Federation of Bosnia and Herzegovina was staged. Bosna reached the final series but was defeated by HKK Široki two games to one. The series marked the beginning of a renewed domestic rivalry in the post-war era.

One year later, in the reorganized national championship that integrated clubs from the Federation of Bosnia and Herzegovina into a unified competition structure, Bosna captured the league title under head coach Sabit Hadžić and assistant Miralem Zubović. The championship-winning roster included Damir Mirković, Terzić, Subašić, Elmedin Konaković, Kurtagić, Emir Halimić, Samir Lerić, Armin Isaković, Admir Bukva, Josip Lovrić, Džuho and Radović. Bosna subsequently participated in the FIBA Saporta Cup, where its return to European competition was widely regarded as a symbolic and sporting success given the strength of opposition and the club’s recent wartime hardships.

Nevertheless, the immediate post-war seasons were characterized by frequent roster changes, limited financial resources and structural instability. Although Bosna briefly re-established itself as a national champion, the lack of long-term financial security and consistent squad continuity prevented the club from fully restoring its pre-war competitive stature.

=== 2001–2004: Period of reorganization ===
KK Bosna was one of the founders and original shareholders of the regional basketball league, which was established in 2001 under the name Adriatic League. In this competition, as well as in the newly formed unified league of Bosnia and Herzegovina, the team was led by the new head coach Draško Prodanović, with an entirely new roster, but without notable results or achievements. This prompted the club management, headed by president Nihad Imamović, to draw up a plan for the reorganization of both the club and the team. The young and promising coach Mensur Bajramović was appointed head of the coaching staff, while former Bosna players Samir Avdić and Elmedin Konaković took over the positions of managing director and sporting director. Matches were once again played at the club’s traditional venue, the Skenderija Arena, and a major attraction for spectators was the return of Nenad Marković, regarded as the best Bosnian and Herzegovinian basketball player of the previous decade. The squad was further strengthened by experienced players Siniša Kovačević and Dejan Parežanin, as well as the country’s most promising young basketball player, Kenan Bajramović, brought in from Čelik Zenica for the 2003-04 season. These changes resulted in full stands at Skenderija, a first-place finish at the end of the first half of the season, the top position heading into the playoffs, and qualification for the final stage of the national cup competition in the previous season. In the championship final series, Bosna was narrowly defeated by Široki Hercegtisak after three closely contested matches, with the deciding game being settled only after overtime.

=== 2004–2010: Domestic success and European campaigns ===
Nenad Marković during player introductions versus KK Partizan in the ABA League, 2005

In the mid-2000s, KK Bosna re-established itself as one of the leading clubs in Bosnia and Herzegovina and a competitive side in the regional ABA League, then known as the Goodyear League for sponsorship reasons. In the 2004–05 and 2005–06 seasons, Bosna reached the league quarterfinal stage, confirming its status as a stable participant among clubs from across the former Yugoslavia. During this period, the club competed under the sponsorship name Bosna ASA BH Telecom and featured a roster that combined experienced domestic players with foreign reinforcements. Key players included Saša Vasiljević, Goran Ikonić, Jasmin Perković, Edin Bavčić and American center Lance Williams.

Bosna achieved significant domestic success in this era, winning the Bosnian Championship in 2005, 2006 and 2008, and lifting the Bosnian Cup in 2005 and 2009. These titles came during an intense rivalry with Široki Hercegtisak, which at the time featured prominent players such as Martin Vanjak, Josip Sesar and Josip Vranković. The Bosna–Široki matchups defined the competitive landscape of Bosnian basketball in the mid-2000s, frequently deciding championship series and cup finals.

In the 2005–06 season, Bosna hosted the ABA League Final Eight tournament in Sarajevo, with matches played at the Skenderija Sports Center. The tournament, then branded as the Goodyear League Final Eight, brought leading regional clubs to the Bosnian capital. Bosna was eliminated in the quarterfinals by Crvena zvezda. Despite the early exit, hosting the event was regarded as a recognition of the club’s organizational capacity and Sarajevo’s continued relevance in regional basketball.

One of the most memorable European campaigns of the decade came in the 2007–08 ULEB Cup, with Bosna coached by Jurij Zdovc. In the group stage, Bosna played a historic game against Alba Berlin, losing 141–127 after five overtimes. At the time, it was the longest and highest-scoring game in the competition’s history. Later in the group stage, Bosna defeated Alba Berlin 91–76 in Sarajevo. The result provided the necessary points differential for Bosna to advance to the knockout phase (Round of 32) of the ULEB Cup. The qualification was considered one of the club’s strongest European achievements since the 1980s.

By the end of the 2000s, Bosna remained competitive domestically and regionally, regularly appearing in the ABA League and contending for national titles. Strong performances in domestic championships and European competitions helped secure sponsorship from BH Telecom and maintained solid attendance at Skenderija. However, rising financial pressures toward the end of the decade foreshadowed the structural difficulties that would emerge in the early 2010s.

=== 2010–2014: Financial ruin and organizational collapse ===
In the years following its domestic and regional relative success, Bosna entered a period of severe financial and organizational difficulty. After competing in the ABA League until March 2010, the club’s fortunes deteriorated rapidly due to mounting debts, blocked bank accounts and unstable management. In March 2010, Bosna was forced to withdraw from the ABA League because it was unable to finance travel and organizational costs, while most foreign and domestic players left the team amid unpaid salaries. The withdrawal marked the end of Bosna’s continuous presence in regional competition, where it had been a regular participant since the league’s founding in 2001.

The financial collapse also affected the club’s domestic standing. During the 2010–11 season, Bosna struggled to assemble a competitive roster and relied heavily on youth players and short-term signings. The crisis deepened as creditors initiated legal proceedings and the club’s accounts remained blocked, preventing normal operations. In May 2011, FIBA imposed sanctions on the club due to outstanding debts to player Nikola Vučurović, restricting its international participation and blocking the issuance of clearance letters required for transfers. These sanctions further limited the club’s ability to rebuild and contributed to its continued decline. The sanctions remained in effect for several years and were finally lifted in January 2017, when FIBA confirmed that Bosna had settled its outstanding obligations to Nikola Vučurović, restoring the club’s eligibility to participate in international competitions.

Between 2011 and 2013, Bosna competed in the Bosnian League but remained in the lower half of the standings. Frequent changes in coaching staff and club leadership reflected ongoing institutional instability, while supporters and former players warned publicly of the possibility that the club could cease operations entirely.

=== 2014–2024: Rebranding and survival ===
Financial stress culminated in 2014 when severe debts prompted a decision to merge the historic club with lower league KK Royal. An agreement on business and technical cooperation between the two was concluded which, according to individuals who were involved with the club at the time, was assessed by auditors as the only possible legal and lawful course of action to prevent the former European champion from entering liquidation. The agreement provided that, in order to preserve the name and emblem of KK Bosna, KK Royal would be granted the right to use the name and crest of KK Bosna. The Assembly of KK Royal and its founders accepted this arrangement and proceeded with the signing of the agreement, as did the management of KK Bosna. The agreement has been in force since 24 October 2014. Under its terms, KK Royal was granted the right to use the name and crest of KK Bosna and, in return, any surplus funds remaining at the end of the calendar year were to be transferred to the blocked accounts of KK Bosna.

From 2014 to 2019, the club oscillated between struggling domestic campaigns and efforts to rebuild. In its first season after the rebranding, Bosna finished 13th in the 2014–15 Bosnian League. A similar struggle followed in 2015–16, with the team again near the bottom of the league standings. In 2016, Bosna faced a renewed threat of bankruptcy and relegation. Former star players Saša Vasiljević and Goran Ikonić returned to the team to help stabilize the club. A decisive victory over Sloboda in the closing round of the season, played before a packed Skenderija hall, secured Bosna’s survival in the top division.

Despite surviving relegation in 2016, the club’s performances remained inconsistent. In the 2018–19 Bosnian League season, Bosna recorded one of its poorest domestic results, finishing last with a 1–24 record. Throughout the late 2010s and early 2020s, Bosna underwent frequent changes in management and coaching staff as it sought to rebuild sporting credibility while operating under constrained financial conditions. By the early 2020s, Bosna was working to regain domestic competitiveness. After mid-table finishes in 2021–22 and 2022–23, the club began to show signs of stabilization.

=== 2024–present: Resurgence ===
Under new management headed by club president Dubravko Barbarić, Bosna won the 2023–24 Mirza Delibašić Cup, defeating favourites Igokea in the semi-finals and HKK Široki 83–73 in the final. The team was coached by Aleksandar Damjanović, who guided the squad through the competition. Standout performances in the final were delivered by Vojin Ilić with 26 points and Dontay Caruthers with 15, alongside notable contributions from Haris Ćurevac and team captain Muhamed Pašalić. The title marked the club’s first national cup triumph in 14 years.

In the 2024–25 season, also under head coach Aleksandar Damjanović, the club participated in the ABA League Second Division and won the competition after defeating Ilirija in the finals. Jarrod West, playing for Bosna, was named the Finals MVP. As champions, the club qualified for the ABA League for the 2025–26 season, marking its return to the competition for the first time in 15 years.

In the 2025–26 season, Bosna defeated Kangoeroes Basket Mechelen in the qualifiers to secure their place in the FIBA Europe Cup regular season. Bosna qualified for the Top 8 of the 2025–26 ABA League on 31 January 2026, securing fourth place in Group B a round before the end of the regular season and ensuring progression to the next phase of the competition. In the 2025–26 FIBA Europe Cup, Bosna advanced to the quarterfinals by finishing among the top two teams in Group L; the club clinched its place after a 76–63 home win over CSM Oradea on 21 January 2026 in Sarajevo. Bosna also bettered their position in the group by defeating Italian side Pallacanestro Reggiana 85–71 at home on 11 February 2026 to finish first in Group L. In the quarterfinals, Bosna was drawn to face Falco KC Szombathely. Despite winning the second leg 78-70 at home on 18 March 2026, with Alfonso Plummer top-scoring with 20 points, Bosna were eliminated, losing 144-151 on aggregate to the Hungarian side.

Bosna won the 2025–26 Mirza Delibašić Cup by defeating Borac 98-70 in the final held on 21 February 2026 in Banja Luka. This victory secured the club’s fifth Bosnian Cup title in its history. Michael Young was named tournament MVP.

Following the conclusion of the ABA League regular season, Bosna finished seventh in the standings and qualified for the league playoffs for the first time since returning to regional competition. In the quarter-finals, Bosna faced second-seeded Partizan in a best-of-three series. The Sarajevo side was defeated 81-73 in the opening game in Belgrade on 6 May 2026 and, despite a competitive showing throughout the series, failed to advance, losing the tie 2–0 and being eliminated by the eventual finalists.

In the domestic championship, Bosna reached the final of the 2025–26 Basketball Championship of Bosnia and Herzegovina, where they met defending champions Igokea. On 28 May 2026, Bosna recorded a crucial 76-70 away victory in Laktaši in the opening leg of the final series, taking a six-point aggregate advantage back to Sarajevo. The return leg was played on 31 May 2026 at the Juan Antonio Samaranch Olympic Hall in Sarajevo. Igokea won the game 100–97 after overtime, overturning Bosna’s first-leg lead during regulation time before the hosts secured the championship on aggregate. Bosna’s six-point victory in the first match proved decisive, allowing the club to claim the national title despite defeat in the second leg. The championship marked Bosna’s fifth Bosnian league title and their first since the 2007–08 season, ending an 18-year wait.

== Sponsorship naming ==
Bosna has had several denominations through the years due to its sponsorship:

- Bosna ASA: 1998–2003
- Bosna ASA BH Telecom: 2003–2010
- Bosna Royal Jelly: 2016–2017
- Bosna Meridianbet: 2022–2024
- Bosna Visit Sarajevo: 2024–2025
- Bosna BH Telecom: 2025–present

== Visual identity ==
The club's original crest, in use from 1951 to 1992.

The traditional colours of KK Bosna are maroon and white, which have served as the club’s primary visual identity since its foundation. Gold and yellow have frequently been used as auxiliary colours, particularly in club insignia, commemorative materials and championship-related branding. Bosna’s original crest consisted of a shield divided into white and maroon fields, featuring a stylised lowercase letter b and a star, with five Olympic rings positioned above the shield. The inclusion of the Olympic rings reflected the club’s affiliation with the ideals of the Olympic movement and amateur university sport, which played a central role in the club’s early identity as part of the University Sports Society Bosna. Following the 1984 Winter Olympics in Sarajevo, the rings became informally associated by supporters and the wider public with the city’s Olympic heritage, further strengthening the symbol’s significance within the club’s visual culture. Throughout its history, Bosna has periodically modernised its branding and introduced revised versions of its crest, while generally preserving the maroon-and-white colour scheme and references to the club’s historical legacy.

The club’s current crest is a modernised interpretation of earlier designs, incorporating a shield motif and the club’s traditional colours. A prominent star is positioned above the crest, commemorating Bosna’s victory in the 1978–79 FIBA European Champions Cup, making Bosna the first club from Bosnia and Herzegovina and the former Yugoslavia to win Europe’s premier club basketball competition. The star serves as a permanent reminder of the club’s greatest sporting achievement and its place in European basketball history. KK Bosna is commonly known by the nickname Bordo-bijeli (The Maroon-Whites), derived from its traditional colours; the nickname is also shared with fellow Sarajevo sports club FK Sarajevo, whose teams similarly wear maroon and white. Another widely used nickname is Studenti (The Students), reflecting the club’s origins within the University Sports Society Bosna and its longstanding connection to the academic community of Sarajevo and the University of Sarajevo. The nickname remained in common use even as the club developed into one of the leading basketball institutions in the former Yugoslavia and Bosnia and Herzegovina, and it continues to be employed by supporters, media outlets and club officials.

== Supporters ==
KK Bosna traditionally garnered a majority of its fan base from supporters of FK Sarajevo, and more specifically the latter's ultras firm, Horde zla, given the fact that both clubs share unique maroon and white team colours.

Through time the two sides became colloquially interchangeable, as Horde zla equally followed both, with the two clubs forming an unofficial, so-called Maroon Family. On 29 August 2013 FK Sarajevo and KK Bosna's handball sister club, RK Bosna, signed a cooperation agreement based on the principle of strengthening ties between the aforementioned family members. On 6 November 2013 the same was done between FK Sarajevo and KK Bosna Royal, by which the forty-year-old relationship was officialized.

== Home venues ==
Mirza Delibašić Hall

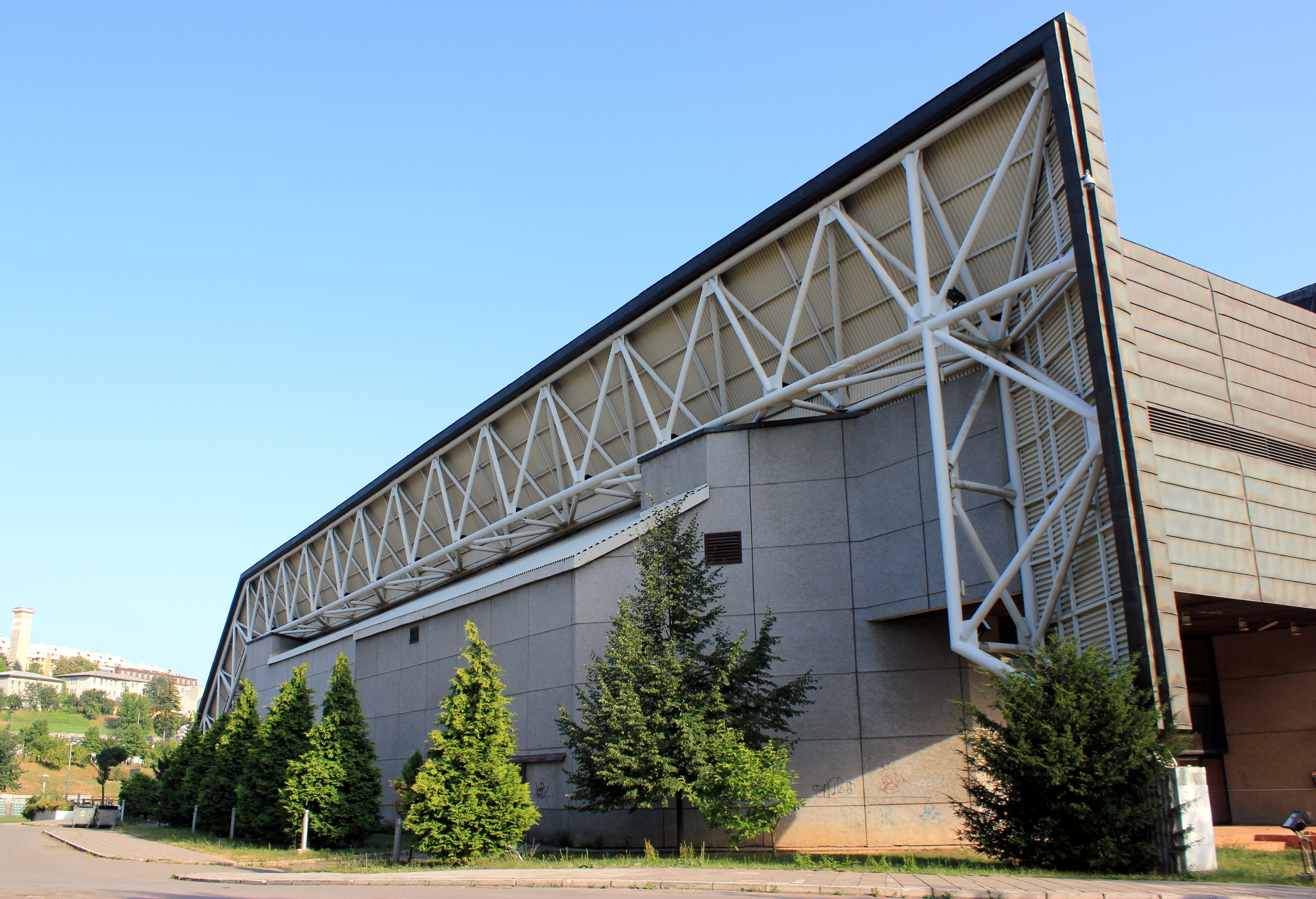
Zetra Olympic Hall

KK Bosna Royal play their home fixtures at the Skenderija Sports Center, located in the Centar Municipality of Sarajevo. It was constructed in 1969 as a cultural and sport center, but was later revitalized and expanded for the 1984 Winter Olympic Games. Below the structure is a shopping mall. It sustained minor damage during the war, but is decaying due to lack of upkeep, it is revitalized since 2007. On 12 February 2012, after a record snowfall in Sarajevo, the roof of one of the halls fell in making that building unusable. The damage after this is said to be 'huge' and is yet unknown if that building will be rebuilt.

As of June 2025, the club’s primary playing arena is the Juan Antonio Samaranch Olympic Hall, also known as the Zetra Olympic Complex in Sarajevo, which covers an area of over seven square kilometers and is the largest sports and recreational complex in the city. The complex was originally built to host the 1984 Winter Olympics and was designed by architects Dušan Đapa and Ludmil Alkafić. At its center is the multifunctional Zetra Olympic Hall, with a seating capacity of 12,000, which regularly hosts sporting, cultural, and entertainment events, as well as trade fairs. The hall was damaged and burned in 1992 during the Bosnian War, but was renovated in the late 1990s with support from the International Olympic Committee and has since been in honour of Juan Antonio Samaranch, the longtime IOC president. In addition to the main hall, the central building houses three smaller halls, a shooting range, a bowling alley, a fitness center, a dance studio, and administrative facilities. An adjacent annex contains the offices of the Olympic Committee of Bosnia and Herzegovina and the Olympic Museum, while other parts of the complex include a speed skating stadium, which in summer hosts tennis courts and a karting track.

== Players ==
=== Current roster ===
Note: Flags indicate national team eligibility at FIBA-sanctioned events. Players may hold other non-FIBA nationalities not displayed.

Bosna roster
Players
Coaches

| Pos. | No. | Nat. | Name | Ht. | Age |
|---|---|---|---|---|---|
| PG | 0 | (Bosnia and Herzegovina) | Klještan, Miljan | 1.85 m (6 ft 1 in) | 19 – 28 June 2007 |
| C | 1 | (United States) | Banks III, James | 2.08 m (6 ft 10 in) | 28 – 16 January 1998 |
| PG | 2 | (United States) | Pipes, P.J. | 1.88 m (6 ft 2 in) | 27 – 20 March 1999 |
| G/F | 3 | (United States) | Domask, Marcus | 1.98 m (6 ft 6 in) | 26 – 9 June 2000 |
| G/F | 4 | (United States) | Gholston, Deandre | 1.95 m (6 ft 5 in) | 26 – 8 July 2000 |
| G/F | 5 | (Bosnia and Herzegovina) | Atić, Edin | 2.01 m (6 ft 7 in) | 29 – 19 January 1997 |
| F | 7 | (Bosnia and Herzegovina) | Vrabac, Adin (C) | 2.05 m (6 ft 9 in) | 32 – 27 January 1994 |
| PF | 11 | (United States) | Perry, Reggie | 2.08 m (6 ft 10 in) | 26 – 21 March 2000 |
| PG | 14 | (Puerto Rico) | Browne, Gary | 1.85 m (6 ft 1 in) | 33 – 24 March 1993 |
| SG | 15 | (Bosnia and Herzegovina) | Mandžukić, Adin | 1.92 m (6 ft 4 in) | 20 – 28 January 2006 |
| PG | 19 | (Bosnia and Herzegovina) | Talić, Darko | 1.92 m (6 ft 4 in) | 28 – 23 February 1998 |
| C | 21 | (Serbia) | Popović, Nikola | 2.11 m (6 ft 11 in) | 29 – 19 July 1997 |
| F/C | 22 | (Bosnia and Herzegovina) | Livadić, Daut | 2.08 m (6 ft 10 in) | 19 – 28 August 2007 |
| F/C | 33 | (Bosnia and Herzegovina) | Islamović, Alija | 2.08 m (6 ft 10 in) | 25 – 10 May 2001 |
| PF | 44 | (United States) | Hawkins, Ryan | 2.04 m (6 ft 8 in) | 29 – 12 May 1997 |

Head coach

- (Croatia) Dario Gjergja

Assistant coach(es)

- (Croatia) Ivan Perinčić
- (Croatia) Nikola Bukvić

Strength & conditioning coach(es)

- (Bosnia and Herzegovina) Hasib Muratović

Physiotherapist(s)

- (Bosnia and Herzegovina) Amer Salihagić
- (Bosnia and Herzegovina) Benjamin Bašović

Team manager

- (Bosnia and Herzegovina) Mujo Tuljković

Legend

- (C) Team captain
- Injured

- Roster
Updated: October 10, 2026

=== Depth chart ===
| Pos. | Starting 5 | Bench 1 | Bench 2 |
|---|---|---|---|
| C | Reggie Perry | Nikola Popović | James Banks III |
| PF | Ryan Hawkins | Adin Vrabac | Daut Livadić |
| SF | Marcus Domask | Edin Atić | Alija Islamović |
| SG | Deandre Gholston | P.J. Pipes | Adin Mandžukić |
| PG | Darko Talić | Gary Browne | Miljan Klještan |

== Notable players ==
Note: Flags indicate national team eligibility at FIBA-sanctioned events. Players may hold other non-FIBA nationalities not displayed.

Criteria

To appear in this section a player must have either:

- Set a club record or won an individual award while at the club
- Played at least one official international match for their national team at any time
- Played at least one official NBA match at any time.

- (Bosnia and Herzegovina) Dževad Alihodžić
- (Bosnia and Herzegovina) Edin Atić
- (Bosnia and Herzegovina) Samir Avdić
- (Bosnia and Herzegovina) Kenan Bajramović
- (Bosnia and Herzegovina) Edin Bavčić
- (Socialist Federal Republic of Yugoslavia) Predrag Benaček
- (Bosnia and Herzegovina) Adis Bećiragić
- (Socialist Federal Republic of Yugoslavia) Sabahudin Bilalović
- (Finland) Perttu Blomgren
- (Bosnia and Herzegovina) Vedran Bosnić
- (United States) J.R. Bremer
- (Puerto Rico) Gary Browne
- (Bosnia and Herzegovina) Sejo Bukva
- (Socialist Federal Republic of Yugoslavia) Zdravko Čečur
- (Bosnia and Herzegovina) Haris Delalić
- (Socialist Federal Republic of Yugoslavia) Mirza Delibašić
- (Bosnia and Herzegovina) Nihad Đedović
- (Socialist Federal Republic of Yugoslavia) Anto Đogić
- (United States) Darren Fenn
- (Bosnia and Herzegovina) Gordan Firić
- (United States) Clarence Gilbert
- (Socialist Federal Republic of Yugoslavia) Sabit Hadžić
- (Bosnia and Herzegovina) Miralem Halilović
- (Bosnia and Herzegovina) Emir Halimić
- (United States) Kyle Hill
- (Kosovo) Amin Hot
- (Bosnia and Herzegovina) Goran Ikonić
- (Bosnia and Herzegovina) Vojin Ilić
- (Socialist Federal Republic of Yugoslavia) Nihad Izić
- (Bosnia and Herzegovina) Ermin Jazvin
- (Estonia) Janari Jõesaar
- (Bosnia and Herzegovina) Draško Knežević
- (Federal Republic of Yugoslavia) Feliks Kojadinović
- (Serbia) Petar Kovačević
- (Bosnia and Herzegovina) Siniša Kovačević
- (Croatia) Filip Krušlin
- (Bosnia and Herzegovina) Damir Krupalija
- (Democratic Republic of the Congo) Christian Lutete
- (Argentina) Lautaro López
- (Panama) Jaime Lloreda
- (Serbia) Ivan Marinković
- (Bosnia and Herzegovina) Nenad Marković
- (Socialist Federal Republic of Yugoslavia) Mirsad Milavić
- (Bosnia and Herzegovina) Milan Milošević
- (Bosnia and Herzegovina) Damir Mirković
- (Socialist Federal Republic of Yugoslavia) Miroljub Mitrović
- (Socialist Federal Republic of Yugoslavia) Emir Mutapčić
- (Bosnia and Herzegovina) Elvir Ovčina
- (Socialist Federal Republic of Yugoslavia) Gavrilo Pajović
- (Bosnia and Herzegovina) Muhamed Pašalić
- (Croatia) Jasmin Perković
- (United States) Reggie Perry
- (Socialist Federal Republic of Yugoslavia) Svetislav Pešić
- (Puerto Rico) Alfonso Plummer
- (Socialist Federal Republic of Yugoslavia) Mario Primorac
- (Socialist Federal Republic of Yugoslavia) Ratko Radovanović
- (Socialist Federal Republic of Yugoslavia) Zdravko Radulović
- (Bosnia and Herzegovina) Dženan Rahimić
- (Federal Republic of Yugoslavia) Miljan Rakić
- (Slovenia) Hasan Rizvić
- (North Macedonia) Darko Sokolov
- (Serbia) Đoko Šalić
- (Montenegro) Sead Šehović
- (Montenegro) Suad Šehović
- (Bosnia and Herzegovina) Darko Talić
- (Federal Republic of Yugoslavia) Tomislav Tomović
- (Bosnia and Herzegovina) Mujo Tuljković
- (Socialist Federal Republic of Yugoslavia) Žarko Varajić
- (Bosnia and Herzegovina) Saša Vasiljević
- (Socialist Federal Republic of Yugoslavia) Boro Vučević
- (Bosnia and Herzegovina) Adin Vrabac
- (United States) Jarrod West
- (United States) Lance Williams
- (Jordan) Rasheim Wright
- (United States) Michael Young
- (Bosnia and Herzegovina) Jure Zubac

== Honours ==
Total titles: 15

=== Domestic competitions ===
- Bosnia and Herzegovina League

Winners (5): 1998–99, 2004–05, 2005–06, 2007–08, 2025–26

- Cup of Bosnia and Herzegovina

Winners (5): 2004–05, 2008–09, 2009–10, 2023–24, 2025–26

- Yugoslav League (defunct)

Winners (3): 1977–78, 1979–80, 1982–83
Runners-up (1): 1976–77

- Yugoslav Cup (defunct)

Winners (2): 1977–78, 1983–84
Runners-up (3): 1979-80, 1985–86, 1991–92

- Yugoslav Second League (defunct)

Winners (1): 1971-72

=== European competitions ===
- EuroLeague

Winners (1): 1978–79
3rd place (1): 1979–80
4th place (2): 1980–81, 1983–84

- FIBA Korać Cup (defunct)

Runners-up (1): 1977–78
Semifinalist (1): 1989–90

=== Regional competitions ===
- ABA League Second Division

Winners (1): 2024–25

=== Worldwide competitions ===
- FIBA Intercontinental Cup
- Runners-up (1): 1979
- 3rd (1): 1980

=== Other competitions ===
- Torneo di Sanremo

Winners (1): 1980

- Kyiv Druzhba Tournament

Winners (1): 1984

- Mirza Delibašić Memorial

Winners (2): 2007, 2008

- Split Cup

Winners (1): 2025

== International record ==
| Season | Achievement | Notes |
EuroLeague
| 1978–79 | Champions | defeated Emerson Varese, 96–93 in the final of European Champions Cup in Grenoble |
| 1979–80 | Semi-final group stage | 3rd place in a group with Maccabi Tel Aviv, Real Madrid, Sinudyne Bologna, Nashua EBBC and Partizan |
| 1980–81 | Semi-final group stage | 4th place in a group with Sinudyne Bologna, Maccabi Tel Aviv, Nashua EBBC, Real Madrid and CSKA Moscow |
| 1983–84 | Semi-final group stage | 4th place in a group with FC Barcelona, Banco di Roma Virtus, Jollycolombani Cantù, Maccabi Tel Aviv and Limoges CSP |
FIBA Korać Cup
| 1977–78 | Final | lost to Partizan, 110–117 in the final (Banja Luka) |
| 1989–90 | Semi-finals | eliminated by Ram Joventut, 90-90 (D) in Sarajevo and 72-94 (L) in Badalona |
FIBA Intercontinental Cup
| 1979 | 2nd | 2nd place in a league with Sírio, Emerson Varese, Piratas de Quebradillas and Mo-Kan NCAA Stars |
| 1980 | 3rd | 3rd place in a league with Maccabi Tel Aviv, Atlética Francana, Real Madrid and Kansas NCAA All-Stars |

== Records ==
| Rank | Player | KKB Career | Games |
|---|---|---|---|
| 1. | Mirza Delibašić | 1972–1980 | 700 |
| 2. | Ratko Radovanović | 1977–1983 | 500 |

| Rank | Player | KKB Career | Points |
|---|---|---|---|
| 1. | Mirza Delibašić | 1972–1980 | 14,000 |
| 2. | Ratko Radovanović | 1977–1983 | 10,000 |

== Youth department ==
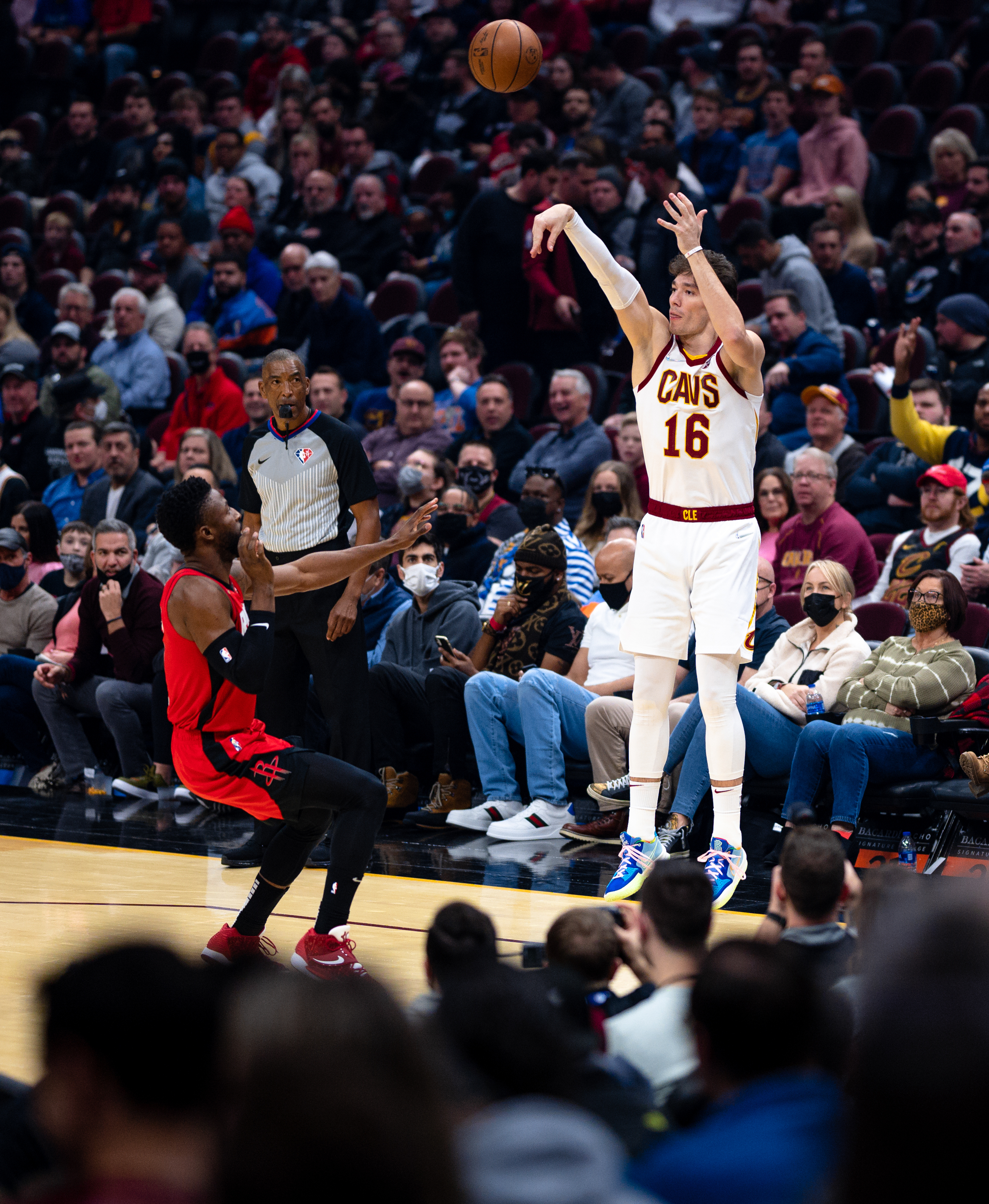
Cedi Osman is a product of Bosna's youth department.

Bosna maintains a structured youth development programme that forms an integral part of the club’s sporting activities. The department is tasked with identifying and nurturing young basketball talent through age‑group teams, systematic training and participation in regional and national competitions. KK Bosna’s youth system is considered one of the established youth programmes within Bosnian basketball, providing a developmental pathway from the under-10 level to senior competition. The club’s junior and developmental team competes under the name Studenti, a designation that recalls the club’s historical association with the student community in Sarajevo. Studenti participate in the A2 League of Bosnia and Herzegovina, the second-tier of Bosnian basketball, where young players are afforded competitive experience against senior teams as part of their development process. The team has achieved notable results within this league and contributes to the transition of players from youth categories to higher levels of domestic basketball competition.

=== Notable youth products ===
- (Turkey) Cedi Osman
- (Bosnia and Herzegovina) Nihad Đedović
- (Bosnia and Herzegovina) Nenad Marković
- (Federal Republic of Yugoslavia) Haris Brkić
- (Socialist Federal Republic of Yugoslavia) Predrag Danilović

== Club management ==
=== Presidents ===
Below is a list of KK Bosna's presidents from 1946 until the present day.

| Name | Years |
|---|---|
| (Socialist Federal Republic of Yugoslavia) Nedžad Brkić | 1951-1964 |
| (Socialist Federal Republic of Yugoslavia) Osman Maglajlić | 1964-1966 |
| (Socialist Federal Republic of Yugoslavia) Vukašin Tripković | 1970-1980 |
| (Socialist Federal Republic of Yugoslavia) Emerik Blum | 1980-1982 |
| (Socialist Federal Republic of Yugoslavia) Ljubomir Zorić | 1982–1984 |
| (Bosnia and Herzegovina) Mišo Dreković | 1994 |
| (Bosnia and Herzegovina) Nihad Imamović | 1997–2010 |
| (Bosnia and Herzegovina) Emir Ahmetagić | 2010 |
| (Bosnia and Herzegovina) Almir Spaho | 2010 |
| (Bosnia and Herzegovina) Safudin Čengić | 2011–2012 |
| (Bosnia and Herzegovina) Miralem Šabović | 2012–2013 |
| (Bosnia and Herzegovina) Fuad Bajraktarević | 2013–2014 |
| (Bosnia and Herzegovina) Adnan Jašarević | 2014–2015 |
| (Bosnia and Herzegovina) Almir Bradić | 2015–2017 |
| (Bosnia and Herzegovina) Damir Krupalija | 2017 |
| (Bosnia and Herzegovina) Harun Mahmutović | 2017–2019 |
| (Bosnia and Herzegovina) Almir Bradić | 2020–2023 |
| (Bosnia and Herzegovina) Dubravko Barbarić | 2023–2026 |
| (Bosnia and Herzegovina) Nihad Selimović | 2026–present |

=== Directors ===
Below is a list of KK Bosna’s directors by year.

| Name | Years |
|---|---|
| (Socialist Federal Republic of Yugoslavia) Svetislav Pešić | 1981–1982 |
| (Socialist Federal Republic of Yugoslavia) Goran Radonjić | 1989 |
| (Bosnia and Herzegovina) Mirza Delibašić | 1995–2001 |
| (Bosnia and Herzegovina) Zlatko Akšamija | 2001–2002 |
| (Bosnia and Herzegovina) Elmedin Konaković | 2003–2008 |
| (Bosnia and Herzegovina) Admir Bukva | 2008–2014 |
| (Bosnia and Herzegovina) Damir Krupalija | 2015–2016 |
| (Bosnia and Herzegovina) Goran Perc | 2017 |

=== Sporting directors ===
Below is a list of KK Bosna’s sporting directors by year.

| Name | Years |
|---|---|
| (Bosnia and Herzegovina) Samir Avdić | 2004–2008 |
| (Bosnia and Herzegovina) Goran Terzić | 2014–2016 |
| (Bosnia and Herzegovina) Damir Krupalija | 2017–2018 |
| (Bosnia and Herzegovina) Aleksandar Damjanović | 2018–2019, 2024–2025 |

== Coaching history ==
Below is a list of KK Bosna coaches from 1951 until the present day.

| Name | Nationality | Years |
|---|---|---|
| Nedžad Brkić | (Socialist Federal Republic of Yugoslavia) | 1951–1964 |
| Milenko Novaković | (Socialist Federal Republic of Yugoslavia) | 1964–1971 |
| Bogdan Tanjević | (Socialist Federal Republic of Yugoslavia) | 1971–1974 |
| Luka Stančić | (Socialist Federal Republic of Yugoslavia) | 1974–1975 |
| Bogdan Tanjević | (Socialist Federal Republic of Yugoslavia) | 1975–1980 |
| Draško Prodanović | (Socialist Federal Republic of Yugoslavia) | 1981–1982 |
| Svetislav Pešić | (Socialist Federal Republic of Yugoslavia) | 1982–1987 |
| Mirza Delibašić | (Socialist Federal Republic of Yugoslavia) | 1987 |
| Milivoje Karalejić | (Socialist Federal Republic of Yugoslavia) | 1988 |
| Mladen Ostojić | (Socialist Federal Republic of Yugoslavia) | 1988 |
| Ibrahim Krehić | (Socialist Federal Republic of Yugoslavia) | 1988–1989 |
| Mirza Delibašić | (Socialist Federal Republic of Yugoslavia) | 1989 |
| Draško Prodanović | (Socialist Federal Republic of Yugoslavia) | 1990 |
| Miodrag Baletić | (Socialist Federal Republic of Yugoslavia) | 1990–1991 |
| Mirza Delibašić | (Socialist Federal Republic of Yugoslavia) | 1991–1992 |
| Anto Đogić | (Bosnia and Herzegovina) | 1994 |
| Jovo Terzić | (Bosnia and Herzegovina) | 1994–1995 |
| Sabit Hadžić | (Bosnia and Herzegovina) | 1998–2000 |
| Asim Bradić | (Bosnia and Herzegovina) (Croatia) | 2000–2001 |
| Draško Prodanović | (Bosnia and Herzegovina) | 2001–2002 |
| Hamdo Frljak | (Bosnia and Herzegovina) | 2002–2003 |
| Mensur Bajramović | (Bosnia and Herzegovina) | 2003–2007 |
| Nenad Marković | (Bosnia and Herzegovina) | 2007 |
| Jure Zdovc | (Slovenia) | 2007–2008 |
| Alen Abaz | (Bosnia and Herzegovina) | 2008 |
| Vlada Vukoičić | (Serbia) | 2008–2009 |

| Name | Nationality | Years |
|---|---|---|
| Goran Šehovac | (Bosnia and Herzegovina) | 2009–2010 |
| Dejan Parežanin | (Serbia) (Bosnia and Herzegovina) | 2010–2011 |
| Damir Zeljković | (Bosnia and Herzegovina) | 2011 |
| Sabahudin Bašović | (Bosnia and Herzegovina) | 2011 |
| Hamdo Frljak | (Bosnia and Herzegovina) | 2011–2012 |
| Sabahudin Bašović | (Bosnia and Herzegovina) | 2012 |
| Emir Halimić | (Bosnia and Herzegovina) | 2012 |
| Dragoljub Vidačić | (Bosnia and Herzegovina) | 2012–2014 |
| Samir Lerić | (Bosnia and Herzegovina) | 2014 |
| Sabahudin Bašović | (Bosnia and Herzegovina) | 2014 |
| Damir Zeljković | (Bosnia and Herzegovina) | 2014–2015 |
| Senad Redžić | (Bosnia and Herzegovina) | 2015–2016 |
| Dušan Gvozdić | (Serbia) | 2016–2017 |
| Aleksandar Damjanović | (Bosnia and Herzegovina) | 2017–2018 |
| Miloš Pejić | (Serbia) | 2018 |
| Denis Bajramović | (Croatia) (Bosnia and Herzegovina) | 2018–2019 |
| Sabahudin Bašović | (Bosnia and Herzegovina) | 2019 |
| Ahmet Pašalić | (Bosnia and Herzegovina) | 2019–2022 |
| Dženan Rahimić | (Bosnia and Herzegovina) | 2022–2023 |
| Josip Pandža | (Bosnia and Herzegovina) | 2023 |
| Aleksandar Damjanović | (Bosnia and Herzegovina) | 2023–2024 |
| Zoran Kašćelan | (Montenegro) | 2024–2025 |
| Aleksandar Damjanović | (Bosnia and Herzegovina) | 2025 |
| Muhamed Pašalić | (Bosnia and Herzegovina) | 2025–2026 |
| Dario Gjergja | (Croatia) | 2026–present |

== See also ==
- Mirza Delibašić Memorial
