= Miroljub Mitrović =

Personal information
- Born: April 6, 1962 Ražanj, SR Serbia, SFR Yugoslavia

Career history
- 1976–1979: Paraćin
- 1979–1991: Bosna
- 1991: Crvena zvezda
- 1991–1994: Hapoel Holon
- 1994–1995: Proleter Zrenjanin
- 1995–1996: OKK Beograd
- 1996–1997: Shakhtar Irkutsk

Miroljub Mitrović (Serbian Cyrillic: Мирољуб Митровић; born 6 April 1962) is a Serbian former professional basketball player who competed at both club and international youth levels. He represented Yugoslavia at the 1980 FIBA Europe Under-18 Championship, where he was a leading contributor to the junior national team. He spent the majority of his career in Sarajevo, playing for KK Bosna.

== Early life and career ==
Miroljub Mitrović was born on 6 April 1962 in Ražanj, Serbia. He began playing basketball at a young age and quickly attracted attention for his talent at the junior level. As a teenager he played for OKK Paraćin and his performances there earned him invitations to regional camps and selections to junior representative teams.

== Club career ==
Mitrović's early club career saw him compete for OKK Paraćin, where he developed into a promising young player. His performances brought interest from several prominent Yugoslav clubs, including Borac Čačak, Crvena zvezda, and Bosna. He ultimately accepted an offer from Bosna, joining the Sarajevo-based club and contributing to its success during a golden era for Bosnian basketball. Bosna won domestic championships and competed in top European competitions during his tenure.

Later in his career he featured for clubs in Serbia, Israel and Russia.

== International career ==
Mitrović represented Yugoslavia at the 1980 FIBA Europe Under-18 Championship held in Yugoslavia, averaging 11.1 points per game over seven tournament appearances. His scoring and experience helped the team compete at a high level in the European junior competition.

== Personal life ==
After retiring from professional basketball, Mitrović pursued educational and professional interests outside the sport, including coaching education and later relocation to Canada. His son Nemanja is a retired basketball player who represented Bosnia and Herzegovina at the 2013 EuroBasket.
