= KK Slavija =

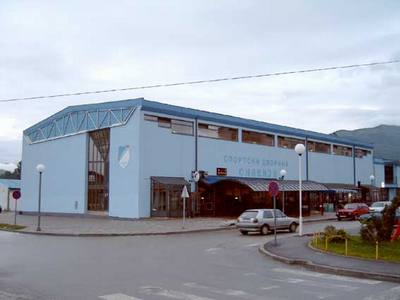
KK Slavija Arena is located in Istočno Novo Sarajevo

Basketball Club Slavija (Serbian Cyrillic: КК Славија) is a basketball club from the City of Istočno Sarajevo, Bosnia and Herzegovina. Currently, KK Slavija competes in the National Championship of Bosnia and Herzegovina.
