= KK Čelik =

KK Zenica Čelik (a.k.a. Omladinski košarkaški klub Čelik) is a Bosnian basketball team that competes in the Basketball Championship of Bosnia and Herzegovina. Formed in 1946, Zenica Čelik was champion of the Yugoslav second division (1. liga B) three times and played many years in the prestigious Yugoslav First Basketball League. At that time, first Yugoslav League was considered the best basketball league in Europe and the second best in the world, behind the NBA. In 1999, Zenica Čelik merged with Zenica Metalno.

== Trophies and awards ==
- Bosnian A1 League
  - Winners (3): 1994–95, 2005–06, 2008–09, 2013–14

== Notable former players ==
- (Bosnia and Herzegovina) (Slovenia) Teoman Alibegović
- (Bosnia and Herzegovina) Dževad Alihodžić
- (Bosnia and Herzegovina) Kenan Bajramović
- (Bosnia and Herzegovina) (Turkey) Adis Bećiragić
- (Bosnia and Herzegovina) Armin Bilić
- (Bosnia and Herzegovina) Miloš Cvijanović
- (Bosnia and Herzegovina) Muhamed Granić
- (Bosnia and Herzegovina) Feđa Jovanović
- (Bosnia and Herzegovina) Abdurahman Kahrimanović
- (Bosnia and Herzegovina) (Serbia) Ognjen Kuzmić
- (Serbia) Dino Sekić
- (Bosnia and Herzegovina) Nebojša Maksimović
- (Bosnia and Herzegovina) Ivan Opačak
- (Bosnia and Herzegovina) (Slovenia) (Turkey) Emir Preldžić
- (Bosnia and Herzegovina) (Slovenia) Hasan Rizvić
- (Serbia) Zoran Savić

== Notable former coaches ==
- Emir Mutapčić
- Mensur Bajramović
- Ljubomir Katić (1975–1979)
- Matan Rimac
- Dino Šekić
- Zdenko Grgić
- Ivica Marić
