= Asem =

- Pronunciation: Arabic: [ˈʕaː.sˤɪm] Turkish: [ˈɑsim] Bosnian: [ǎːsim]
- Gender: Male
- Language: Arabic

Origin
- Meaning: "protector", “guardian”, “defender"

Other names
- Alternative spelling: Asim, Aasem, Assem, Assim

Asem, Aseem, Asım, Assem, Asim, Aasim, Assim, or Asiem is a masculine given name and surname of Arabic origin. It means "savior, protector, guardian, defender." Asem is also a female given name of Kazakh origin, which means "beauty, beautiful, refined, graceful, elegant, excellent, splendid, magnificent." It is not related to the Indian given name Asim. Notable people with the name include:

== Given name ==
=== Aasim ===
- Aasim Sajjad Akhtar, Pakistani teacher and politician
- Aasim Bihari (1889–1953), Indian social activist
- Aasim ibn Abi al-Najud (died 745), Iranian Quran reciter

=== Aseem ===
- Aseem Ali Khan, Indian actor and model

=== Asem ===
- Prince Asem bin Al Nayef (born 1948), Jordanian prince

=== Asiem ===
- Asiem El Difraoui (born 1965), Egyptian-German political scientist, economist, and documentary director

=== Asim ===
- Asim Abbasi, Pakistani-British film director, screenwriter, and producer
- Asim Abdulrahman, Egyptian militant
- Asim Ademov (born 1968), Bulgarian politician
- Asim Iftikhar Ahmad (born 1966), Pakistani diplomat
- Asim Ahmed (born 1963), Maldivian politician and diplomat
- Asim Ali (born 1996), Pakistani cricketer
- Asim Alizade (born 2000), Azerbaijani footballer
- Asim Azhar (born 1996), Pakistani singer
- Asim Saleem Bajwa, Pakistani Army general
- Asim Bradić (born 1975), Bosnian-Croatian sports scientist and basketball coach
- Asim Brkan (born 1954), Bosnian singer, musician, and artist
- Asim Bukhari (1944–2026), Pakistani actor and poet
- Asim Butt (artist) (1978–2010), Pakistani painter and sculptor
- Asim Butt (cricketer) (1967–2009), Pakistani-Scottish cricketer
- Asim Chaudhry (born 1986), British comedian, writer, director, rapper, and actor
- Asim Đulović (born 2005), Serbian basketball player
- Asim Ferhatović (1933–1987), Bosnian footballer
- Asim Gope (born 1994), Bangladeshi field hockey player
- Asim Gutić (born 2001), Bosnian basketball player
- Asim Hafidh (1886–1978), Iraqi artist, educator, and writer
- Asim Hamdan (born 1953), Saudi researcher and historian
- Asim Hassan (born 1986), Indian footballer
- Asim Hrnjić (born 1964), Bosnian footballer
- Asim Hussain (born 1953), Pakistani-Canadian businessman and politician
- Asim Kamal (born 1976), Pakistan cricketer
- Asim Thahit Abdullah al Khalaqi (1968–2015), Yemeni Guantanemo detainee
- Asim Khan (cricketer) (1962–2024), Pakistani-Dutch cricketer
- Asim Khan (squash player) (born 1996), Pakistani squash player
- Asim Ahmed Khan (born 1976), Indian politician
- Asim Ijaz Khwaja, British-Pakistani-American economist
- Asim Kurjak (1942–2026), Bosnian scientist
- Asim Malik, Pakistani Army general
- Asim Medić (born 1969), Bosnian sitting volleyball player
- Asim Mujkić (born 1968), Bosnian philosopher and sociologist
- Asim Munir (born 1968), Pakistani military officer
- Asim Munir (cricketer) (born 1982), Pakistani cricketer
- Asim Peco (1927–2011), Bosnian linguist
- Asim Randeri (1904–2009), Indian poet
- Asim Raza (born 1966), Pakistani film and television commercial director and producer
- Asim Richards (born 2000), American football player
- Asim Saeed (born 1979), Emirati cricketer
- Asim Sarajlić (born 1975), Bosnian politician
- Asim Šehić (born 1981), Bosnian footballer
- Asim Shah (born 1982), Nepali politician, film director, and producer
- Asim Shahmalak (born 1961), British hair transplant surgeon and broadcaster
- Asim Abu Shakra (1961–1990), Palestinian artist
- Asim Siddiqui (born 1976), British-Pakistani charity chairman
- Asim Škaljić (born 1981), Bosnian footballer
- Asim ibn Amr al-Tamimi, Rashidun soldier
- Asim ibn Thabit (died 625), Arab companion of the prophet Muhammad
- Asim Umar (died 2019), Indian militant
- Asim ibn Umar, Rashidun hadith scholar
- Asim Vokshi (1909–1937), Albanian-Kosovar soldier
- Asim Waqif (born 1978), Indian artist
- Asim Zec (born 1994), Bosnian footballer
- Asim Zeneli (1916–1943), Albanian partisan

=== Asım ===
- Asım Akin (1940–2024), Turkish physician
- Asım Orhan Barut (1926–1994), Turkish-American theoretical physicist
- Asım Bezirci (1927–1993), Turkish critic, writer, and poet
- Asım Gündüz (1880–1970), Turkish Army officer
- Asım Can Gündüz (1955–2016), Turkish rock and blues guitarist
- Asım Güzelbey (born 1951), Turkish politician
- Asım Pars (1976–2024), Bosnian-Turkish basketball player
- Asım Vehbi (born 1966), Turkish-Cypriot academic

=== Assem ===
- Assem Afifi (born 1947), Egyptian chess player
- Assem Allam (1939–2022), Egyptian-British businessman
- Assem Dessouki (born 1939), Egyptian academic and historian
- Assem el Gazzar (born 1967), Egyptian engineer and politician
- Assem Jaber (born 1946), Lebanese diplomat
- Assem Jarrah (born 1962), Lebanese relative of 9/11 hijacker Ziad Jarrah
- Assem Marei (born 1992), Egyptian basketball player
- Assem Orynbay (born 1993), Kazakh sports shooter
- Assem Qanso (born 1937), Lebanese politician
- Assem Bey Said (1877–1942), Palestinian politician
- Assem Salam (1924–2012), Lebanese civil engineer, architect, and author

=== Assim ===
- Assim Al-Hakeem (born 1962), Saudi Islamic scholar
- Assim Jamal, Indian actor
- Assim Madibo (born 1996), Sudanese-Qatari footballer

== Surname ==
=== Asem ===
- Princess Nejla bint Asem, Jordanian princess
- Princess Sana Asem, Jordanian princess

== See also ==
- Asia–Europe Meeting
- Hashem
