= Ashim =

Ashim may refer to:

- Ashim, Azerbaijan
- Ashim, Kazakhstan
- Ashim (given name)
- Nurgali Ashim, Kazakh economist and politician

== See also ==
- Asim (disambiguation)
- Askim (disambiguation)
