= Ashim (given name) =

Ashim is a given name. Notable people with the name include:

- Ashim Ahluwalia (born 1972), Indian filmmaker
- Ashim Biswas (footballer) (born 1982), Indian footballer
- Ashim Biswas (politician) (fl. 2021), Indian politician
- Ashim Chatterjee (born 1944), Indian politician
- Ashim Kumer Das (fl. 2021), Bangladeshi archer
- Ashim Krishna Dutt (1892–?), Indian politician
- Ashim Kumar Ghosh (born 1944), Indian academician and politician
- Ashim Kumar Majhi (born 1963), Indian politician
- Ashim Saha (1949–2024), Bangladeshi poet and novelist
- Ashim Samanta (fl. 1976–2012), Indian film and television director and producer
- Ashim Kumar Sarkar (born 1960), Indian politician
- Ashim Kumar Ukil (fl. 2018), Bangladeshi politician

== See also ==
- Aseem
- Asim (disambiguation)
- Askim (disambiguation)
