= Egypt in World War II =

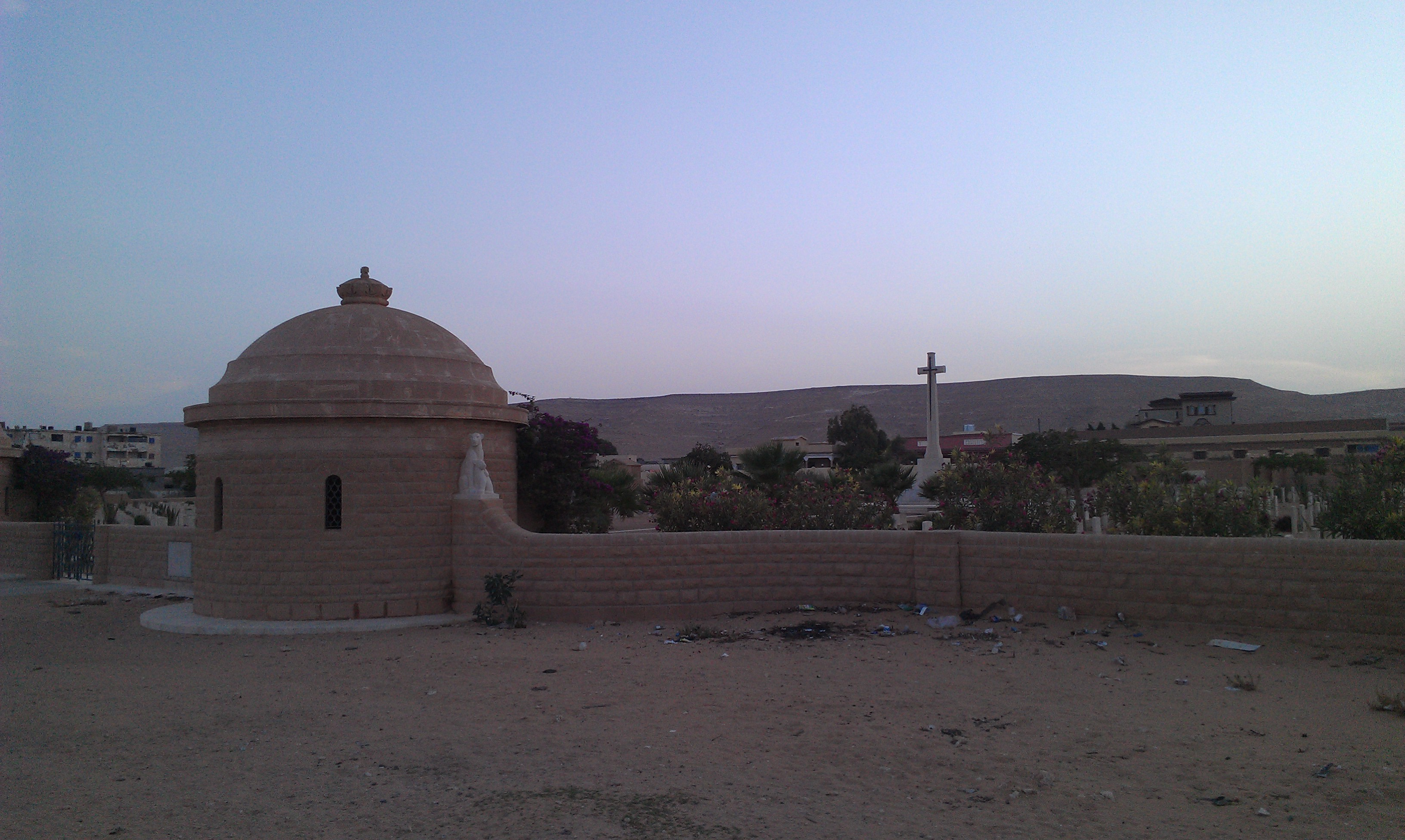
World War II affected many lives in Egypt. Commonwealth graves of victims shown here in Marsa Matrouh, Egypt

German map of Egypt and surrounding region, 1940

Egypt was a major battlefield in the North African campaign during the Second World War, being the location of the First and Second Battles of El Alamein. Legally an independent kingdom since 1922, and an equal sovereign power in the condominium of Anglo-Egyptian Sudan, in reality Egypt was under the heavy coercive influence of the United Kingdom, a state of affairs that had persisted since the UK had intervened militarily in the Orabi Revolt in favour of Egypt's Khedive, Tawfik Pasha in 1882, subsequently occupying the country.

The continuing British dominance of Egyptian affairs, including British efforts to exclude Egypt from the governance of Sudan, provoked fierce Egyptian nationalist opposition to the United Kingdom. Consequently, despite playing host to thousands of British troops following the outbreak of the conflict, as it was treaty-bound to do, Egypt remained formally neutral during the war, only declaring war on the Axis powers in the spring of 1945. Though escaping the fate of Iraq, and Iran, both of whose governments were toppled by the United Kingdom during the war (the latter in conjunction with the Soviet Union), Egypt experienced the Abdeen Palace Incident, a confrontation between Egypt's King Farouk and the British military in 1942, the results of which would contribute directly to the Egyptian revolution of 1952 a decade later.

== Politics ==
=== Egypt before World War II ===
For most of the 19th century, though nominally a self-governing vassal state of the Ottoman Empire, Egypt under the Muhammad Ali dynasty was a virtually independent state, with ever-increasing territorial possessions in East Africa, chiefly Sudan and a political elite class of pashas. Ultimately the United Kingdom would become the dominant foreign power in Egypt and Sudan. In 1875, facing an economic emergency caused in large measure by his grand modernisation plans, Egypt's Khedive, Isma'il the Magnificent, sold to the British government Egypt's shares in the Universal Company of the Maritime Canal of Suez, the company established by Egypt to hold the 99-year lease to manage the Suez Canal. Seen by the United Kingdom as a vital connection to its maritime empire, particularly in India, British control of the Canal was the foundation for British control over Egypt as a whole. Four years later in 1879, the United Kingdom along with the other Great Powers deposed and exiled Isma'il, replacing him with his pliant son Tewfik. After a nationalist revolt led by officer Ahmed Urabi, Britain invaded under the guise of stability. After the revolt was defeated, Britain became the de facto colonial overlord of Egypt, with Evelyn Baring managing the finances of Egypt. British involvement in politics pressured Egypt to join World War One against the Ottoman Empire, who were at war with the British.

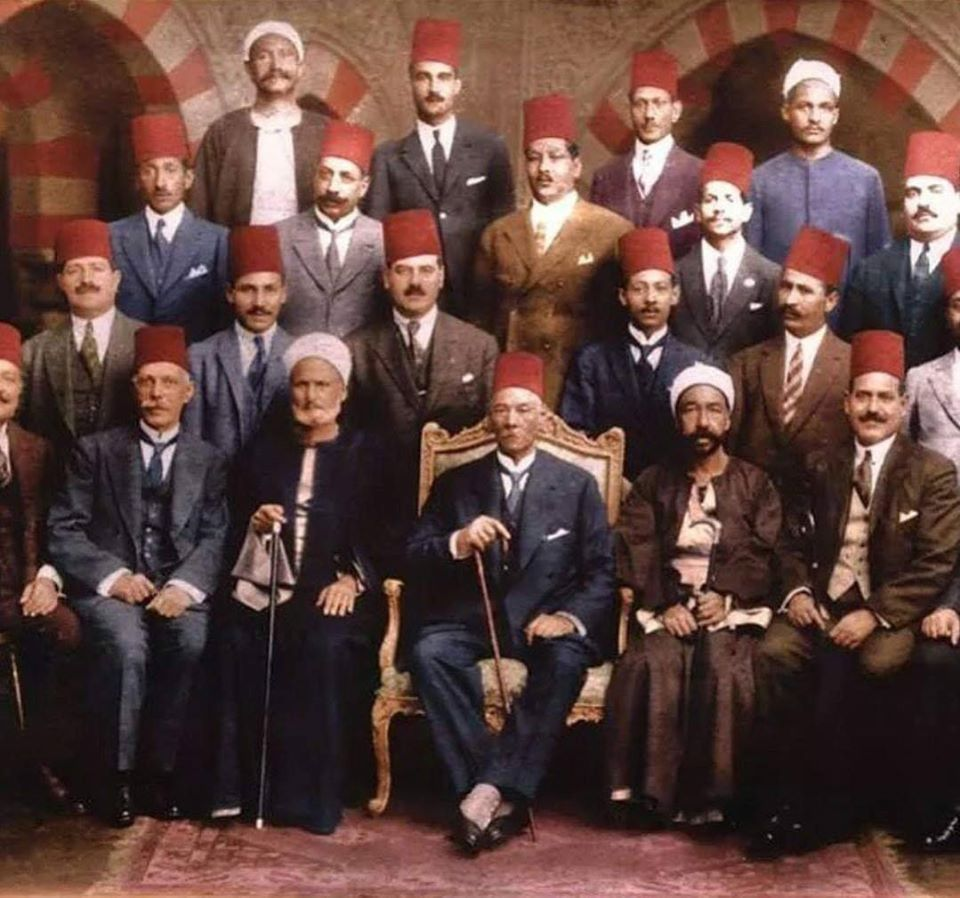
Saad Zaghloul Pasha with members of Al Wafd party.

After the war, a delegation of Egyptian nationalists led by Sa'ad Zaghoul requested for Egyptian independence at the 1919 Paris Peace Conference. Britain tried to prevent independence by arresting the leaders of the delegation, triggering mass protests culminating in the Egyptian revolution of 1919. In 1922, the United Kingdom formally recognised Egypt as an independent state. The delegation (Wafd in Arabic) formed the Wafd party, which was Egypt's most popular and influential political party under the 1923 Egyptian constitution. While the constitution created a democratically elected parliament, the king still had significant political power, being able to appoint the prime minister and dissolve parliament. However, the United Kingdom was able to reserve for itself specific powers in Egypt regarding foreign policy, the deployment of British military personnel in the defense of Egypt and the Suez Canal, and the administration of Sudan. This became a point of contention among Egyptian nationalists who kept negotiating for a more independent Egypt.

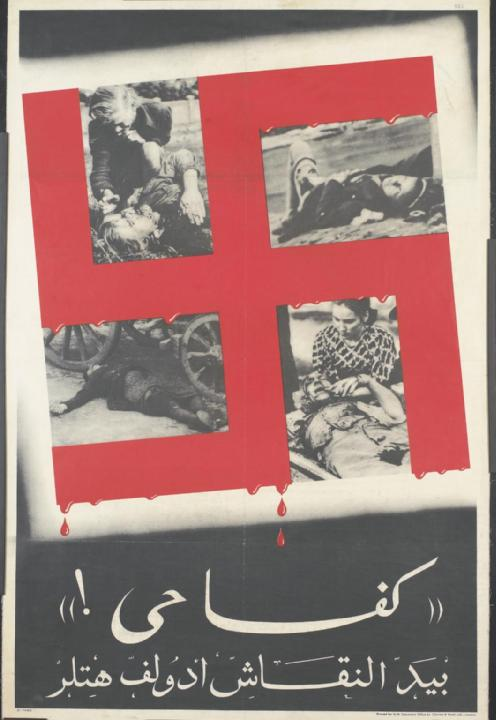
Anti-Nazi poster used in Egypt: the text reads "My Struggle, by Adolf Hitler, the Sculptor", and depicts a bloody swastika and dead civilians.

Politically, Egyptian politics was divided into three main power brokers: the conservative palace, the liberal Wafd Party, and the imperialist British. Each would wrestle for control over one another during this time. While anti-Wafdist parties existed, they did not have the prestige or popularity that the Wafd enjoyed. The British wanted to prevent another revolution while still preserving its influence, while the King and his conservative allies sought to preserve a strong Islamic monarchy against the modern secular liberal forces.

==== 1936 Anglo-Egyptian Treaty ====
After the Italian invasion of Ethiopia, the British position was threatened, as the Kingdom of Egypt was the only country separating Italian Libya and Italian East Africa. According to the 1936 Anglo-Egyptian Treaty, British troops in Egypt were limited to the Suez Canal until 1956 and Alexandria until 1944, except in the case of a war, where instead Britain could increase their troop count. Egypt would also be obligated to materially assist Britain in the case of a war, though Egypt was not obligated to fight for Britain. This treaty gave Britain the legal right to fight World War II on Egyptian soil, while it gave Egypt the right to remain technically neutral in the conflict.

=== The Egyptian government ===
==== Ali Maher's premiership ====
By the start of the war, native power in Egypt was split in between King Farouk, and parliament, led by the conservative anti-Wafdist prime minister Ali Maher Pasha. Initially Maher obliged by the treaty; the Egyptian government broke off relations with Germany, confiscated German property, and interned German subjects. However, the government was not willing to declare war on Germany. The war was seen as a European conflict, disconnected from Egypt. King Farouk was keen for Egypt to remain neutral in the conflict, opposing the United Kingdom's continued dominance of Egyptian affairs. The return of British soldiers to Egyptian streets merely a handful of years after they had been removed or relocated to the Suez Canal Zone, increased the already powerful opposition in Egypt to the United Kingdom. Maher's continued unwillingness to declare war on Italy after the Italian invasion of Egypt further frustrated Britain. During an argument with Sir Miles Lampson, the British ambassador, Maher explained that:

if Egypt had sufficient troops to affect the course of the war, he would not have hesitated to declare war against Italy and Germany, but unfortunately Egypt had on her frontier only 5,000 men inadequately provided with transport. A declaration of war would, therefore, only be a spectacular gesture, causing ruin to 16 million inhabitants.

While Italian-Egyptian relations were broken off, the Egyptian government refused to declare war on Italy. Another focus of grievance between the Egyptian government and the United Kingdom was the insistence that Farouk expel or intern Italians in Egypt, including those Italians in the service of the King. An unconfirmed story assets that Farouk told Lampson: "I'll get rid of my Italians when you get rid of yours". This remark was a reference to the ambassador's Italian wife.

Western Desert Front

The Egyptian government did not do its best to stay neutral because of pro-fascist sympathies, but because of the game of political tug-of-war between Egyptian nationalists and British influence. Egypt was under no obligation to declare war on the enemies of Britain under the 1936 treaty. The front with Italy was seen as border incidents that would only weaken the British, and many Egyptians didn't feel like fighting for the British colonial empire. Lampson was furious at this, demanding in 1940 the withdrawal of Egyptian troops from the Western Desert, Egypt paying for the assumption of its defense by British forces; and the removal of Egyptian chief of staff Aziz Ali al-Misri for pro-Axis sympathies. These demands led to a compromise; General Henry Maitland Wilson would command Egyptian forces in the Western Desert, and al-Misri was dismissed from his post.

==== Hassan Sabry's premiership ====
After Maher was forced to resign due to British influence, Hassan Sabry was appointed prime minister, leading a coalition of anti-Wafdist parties. His government accomplished two concessions from Britain, the abolition of the Caisse de la Dette Publique (the Public Debt Commission, where Egypt paid its debts to European creditors) and the British purchase of Egyptian cotton to support the industry while trade with mainland Europe was cut off. In return, Egypt would cooperate with the British forces, supplying their troops and subsidizing their army with millions of dollars every year. Despite not declaring war, Britain found a compromise, where Britain would be supported by the Egyptian government without direct Egyptian military involvement. This cooperation would have continued, if not for Sabry dying in November 1940.

==== Hussein Sirri Pasha's premiership ====
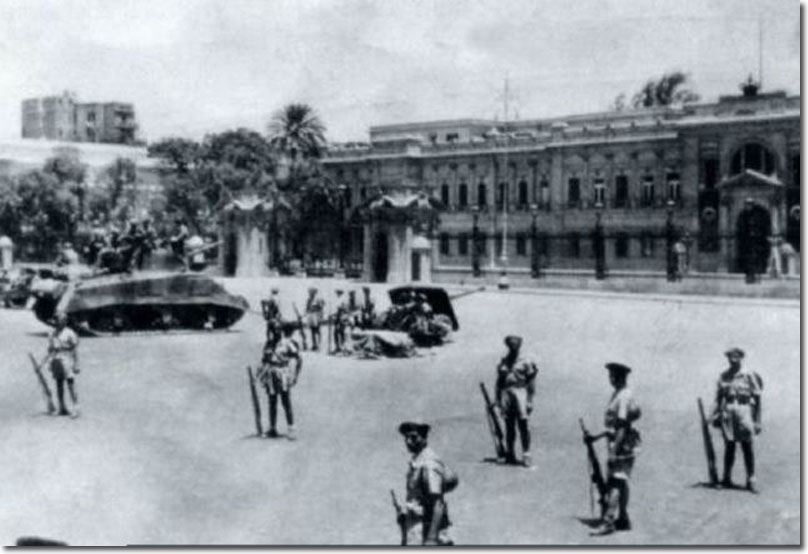
British troops at Abdeen Palace

With the suggestion of Lampson, Hussein Sirri Pasha was quickly appointed prime minister. Sirri promised to continue pro-British politics in parliament, but the state of Egyptian politics at the time was against him. Too deep in conservative politics to ally with the Wafd, and too pro-British to ally with the Italophile King Farouk, his fate was left with a shaky coalition of parties, a coalition of Ittihadists, Liberal-Constitutionalists, the Sa'adists led by Ahmad Maher Pasha, and Independents. During his time, vital problems such as an increased cost of living and food insecurity struck Egypt. The Wafd, led by veteran politician Mostafa el-Nahhas Pasha, saw this as their chance for regaining power, arguing for an end to the Egypt-British condominium in Sudan and the complete evacuation of British forces after the war. The Wafd blamed these problems on the British presence in the country, as the Egyptian people, spurred on by Ali Maher, protested their declining living conditions.

After the fall of Greece, the Greek government of exile was stationed in Egypt. On January 6, 1942, Egypt broke off relations with Vichy France, the fascist rump puppet state of Nazi Germany. This angered King Farouk, who was not considered in this decision. A constitutional crisis emerged over whether or not the king needed to be consulted regarding severing relations with foreign countries. Sirri agreed to resign on February 1, but the crisis soon spiraled out of control.

==== The Abdeen Palace Incident ====
On February 2, Lampson demanded Farouk worked with the Wafdist leader Nahhas to form a coalition government to continue the British presence in Egypt. Lampson was convinced that the Wafd's anti-British rhetoric was only opposition politics, and at their heart, their liberal democratic values and popularity in Egypt would make them a strongest possible ally. However, Nahhas rejected a coalition government, knowing that an alliance with the conservatives would greatly limit his power.

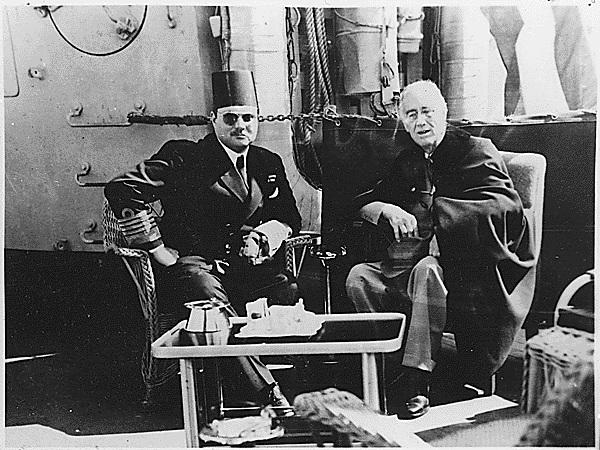
King Farouk I of Egypt (left) meets U.S. President Franklin D. Roosevelt (right) aboard the USS Quincy, anchored in the Great Bitter Lake, north of the Suez Canal. Roosevelt was returning from the Yalta Conference on his way home to the United States.

On February 4, Lampson threatened Farouk, saying 'Unless I hear by 6 p.m. today that Nahas has been asked to form a Government His Majesty King Farouk must accept the consequences." The Egyptian response was a condemnation against British involvement in Egypt's internal affairs. At 9 p.m., Lampson arrived at Abdeen Palace with British soldiers and tanks and threatened the King with the bombardment of his palace, his abdication and exile from Egypt unless he conceded to the British demands. This was not an empty threat; Britain invaded Iraq and overthrew the government of Iran to secure pro-Allied governments. After Lampson ordered Farouk to sign his abdication statement, Farouk offered to call Nahhas to form a cabinet. Though Lampson could have sacked the king right then and there, he agreed to a Nahhas-led Wafd government in Egypt.

Mohamed Naguib, a distinguished military officer and one of the future leaders of the Egyptian revolution of 1952, appealed to Farouk to resist the British, and pledged loyal officers to defend the palace. The incident was seen as a personal humiliation for Farouk, and a national humiliation for Egypt. Gamal Abdel Nasser, then a young military officer who would later lead the Revolution of 1952 with Mohamed Naguib, declared the incident a blatant violation of Egyptian sovereignty, and wrote: "I am ashamed of our army's powerlessness".

==== Mostafa El-Nahas' premiership ====
Elections were held in March, with the Wafd winning 203 out of 264 seats, because of a boycott by the opposition. Ali Maher was arrested in April. Finance minister Makram Ebied Pasha broke with the Wafd Party after calling the agreement between Nahhas and Lampson a "second treaty" and objecting to corruption within the government. After his ouster, he spent the next year writing the Black Book, a book which exposed extreme corruption within the government, especially implicating Nahhas and his wife. Not only was this a major blow to the government, it destroyed relations between Nahhas and Ebied, who were founders of the Wafd party and veterans of the 1919 revolution. Nahhas' legacy as the successor to the revolution after Sa'ad Zaghoul was in serious ruin by this time, especially after Ebied and 26 Wafdist politicians loyal to him formed a rival party. For his journalism, Ebied was arrested on May 9, 1944, until the end of Nahhas' premiership.

During his premiership, Egypt hosted two Allied World War II conferences in its capital, Cairo. The First Cairo Conference planned for the counterattack on Japan, and announced the Cairo Declaration, stating the Allied objective to be unconditional surrender of Japan. The Second Cairo Conference discussed the possible involvement of Turkey in the war against Germany, though it was agreed Turkey would remain neutral. Egypt also hosted the Alexandria Protocol, an agreement between five Arab countries (Egypt, Iraq, Lebanon, Yemen and Syria) agreeing to the formation of a joint Arab Organization, which led to the formation of the League of Arab States in the following year.

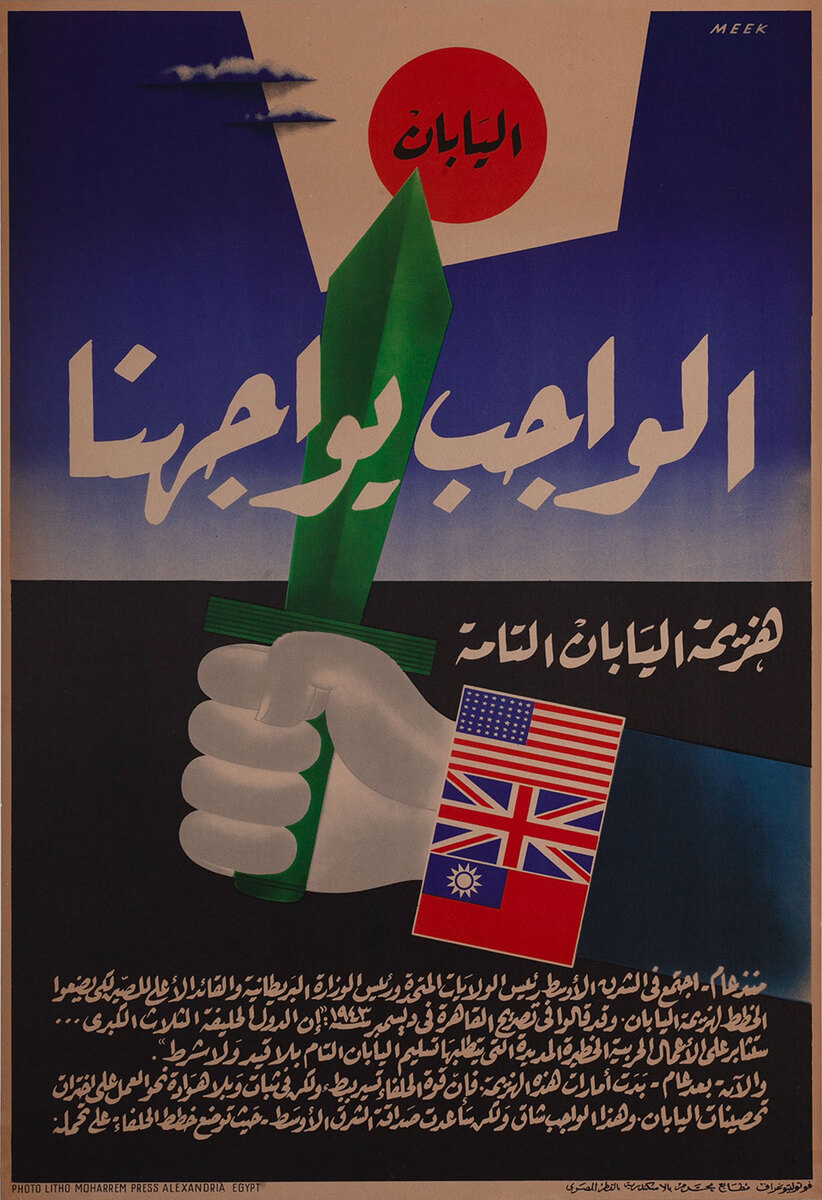
Painting of hand holding upraised sword. Cuff of sleeve is US, UK, Nationalist Chinese flags. Arabic text at bottom talks of 1943 Cairo Conference and 1944 resolve to defeat Japan.

By 1944, World War II in North Africa had ended. King Farouk saw this as his chance to strike at Nahhas and the Wafd. The Wafd's message as the nationalist opposition to the British had been tarnished. Though Lampson saw the Wafd as an ally against the young King, he knew that the government had exhausted its mandate. After Nahhas' tour of Egypt, Farouk claimed that he had acted in a semi-royal fashion, saying that "there could not be two kings of Egypt". Lampson remarked, 'God forbid. We have found that one is quite enough.' Relations between the king and Nahhas were beyond repair. On October 6, 1944, Nahhas was dismissed and Ali Maher and Ebeid were released from prison.

==== Ahmed Maher's premiership ====
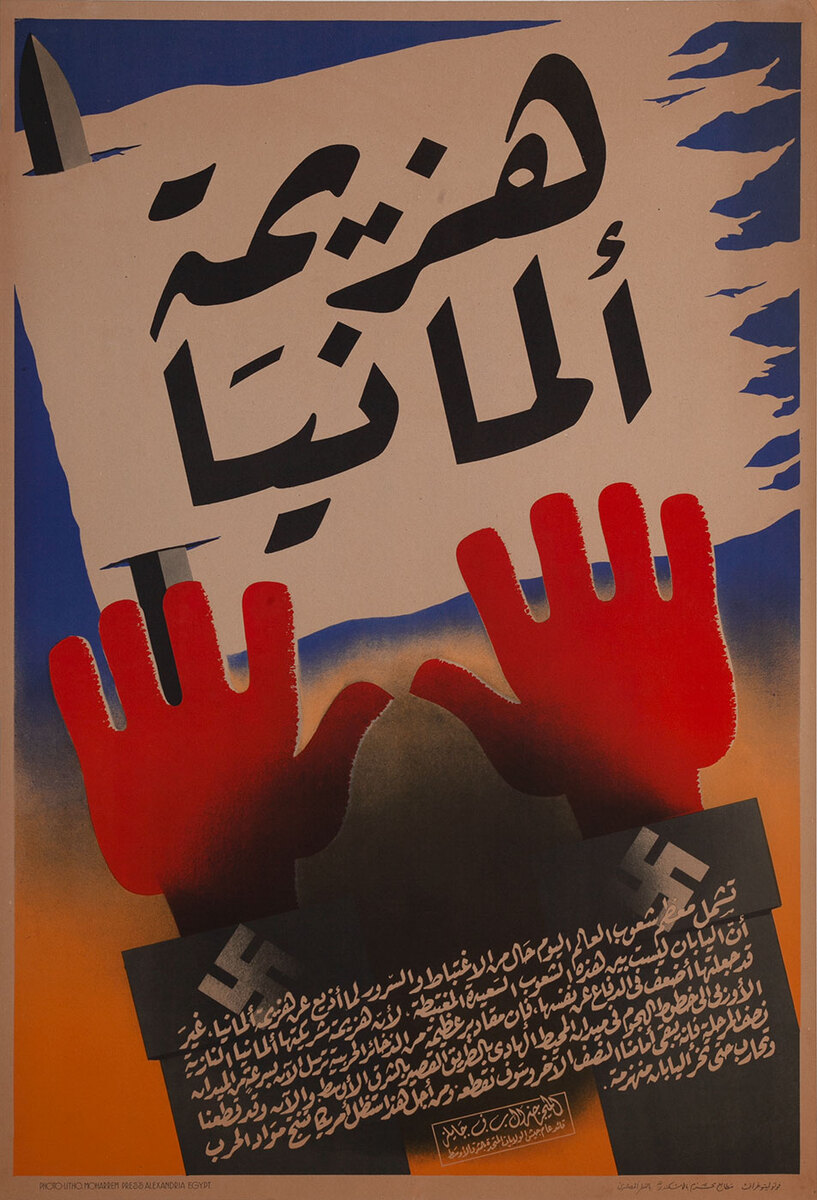
Painting of German hands raised in surrender; bayonet holds banner with Arabic text reading "defeat of Germany." Includes Arabic translation of statement by Maj. Gen. B.F. Giles, CiC, UN forces in Middle East, about meaning of German defeat and saying Japan is next.

Ahmed Maher, the leaders of the Sa'adists – a party of ex-Wafdists – formed a government with the now-freed Ebeid returning as Minister of Finance. The 1945 elections, which were boycotted by the Wafd, were a victory for anti-Wafdist parties. In Europe, it was clear the Germany would lose the war, so politicians looked at a post-war future. The countries that fought the Axis formed the United Nations, a massive inter-governmental organization. It was clear that Egypt would be excluded from the UN if it did not join the war. On February 24, 1945, Egypt declared war on Germany and Japan. Afterwards, as Maher walked down the halls of parliament, he was assassinated by an Egyptian nationalist furious at this 'capitulation' to British influence. Egypt joined the United Nations on October 24, 1945.

=== Egypt after the war ===
The war was a major moment in Egyptian history. An Egyptian prime minister had not been assassinated since Boutros Ghali in 1910, starting a wave of post-war assassinations including ex-finance minister Amin Osman, prime minister Norashy Pasha, and Hasan al-Banna, leader of the Muslim Brotherhood. Egypt's contributions to the war effort re-opened points of contentions like the status of the Sudan, British troop presence in the country, and the Suez Canal. Meanwhile, American interests and involvement in Egypt were growing, signifying the end of the British "old order". The war, more specifically the 1942 Abdeen Palace incident, demonstrated to Egyptians that neither the king or the Wafd could challenge British influence. After the war, riots in 1945 and students protests in 1946 rocked the nation. Egyptian nationalism continued to grower more potent; the 1936 treaty would be annulled in 1951. The extreme divide between rich and poor led to increasing resentment towards the government. The Egyptian ancien régime would collapse during the 1952 revolution, just seven years after the war.

== Domestic opinion in Egypt ==
=== Newspapers ===
Newspapers in Egypt regularly commented on the world affairs at the time, and consistently criticized both Fascist Italy and Nazi Germany. The Second Italo-Ethiopian War alarmed Egyptians, as Italy's naked aggression was denounced as imperialism. The Egyptian newspaper al-Ahram denounced Italy's invasion of Ethiopia, criticizing not just the brutal Italian conquest, but the world for allowing a League of Nations member to be invaded. The newspapers al-Muqattam called it "white imperialism", while al-Ahram "called on the civilized world to join together to oppose Fascist imperialism". An al-Ahram editorial in April 1937 entitled "Italy and the Arabs: A New Orientation in Fascist Policy", stated that Mussolini's attempt at outreach to the Arab world was nothing but hypocrisy. The paper also denounced Germany's aggressive expansion before the war. The Egyptian journalist Muhammad Zaki Abd al-Qadir criticized appeasement, saying "If the world comes under the influence of Hitler, Mussolini, Franco, and their ilk, it will suffer a ghastly regression into the Dark Ages when the military knighthood was the law and war was the symbol of glory". al-Qadir argued that the West should abandon appeasement and should instead confront Germany.

The weekly Ar-risala contained articles in which Hitler was denounced, one of them was an editorial which was published in 1939 and it contained the following quote: "Nazism by its very nature is contradictory to freedom of expression and freedom of opinion; it is based on the rule of force" and "The competition between fascism and Hitlerism is for the enslavement of people". Ahmad Hasan al-Zayyat was an influential Egyptian political writer and intellectual. While he worked as an editor for Ar-risala, he wrote scathing articles on Hitler and fascism. While he attacked Nazi racism and Italy's invasion of Ethiopia before, his magnum opus was a 1939 editorial "The Crime of Nazism against Humanity." Zayyat viewed Nazism as a demonic power in contradiction to the Abrahamic religions and rejected the racist anti-Semitic ideology of Hitler. The newspaper Al Muqattam contained articles which criticized Nazi racial ideology and its anti-semitism.

Nazi Germany's expansion in Austria and Czechoslovakia further worried the press. Al-Muqattam also criticized the racial laws in Nazi Germany, going on to say:

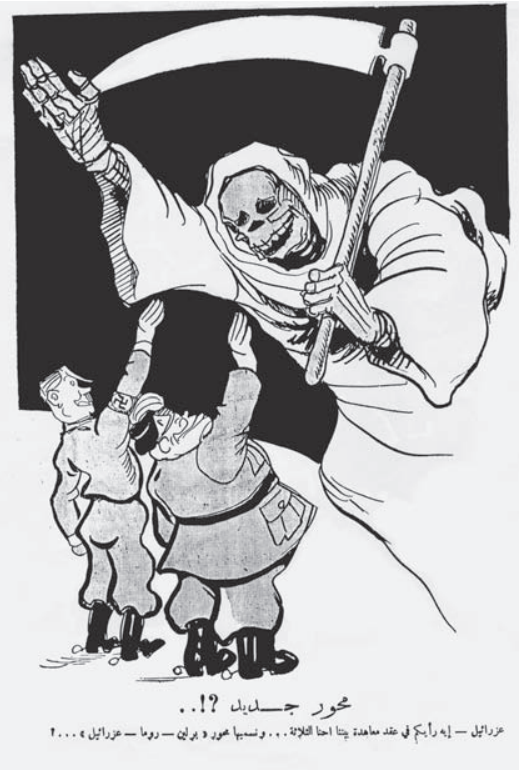
"New Axis?!" Azrael: "What do you think about a covenant between the three of us that we will call the 'Rome- Berlin- Azrael' Axis?" Ruz al- Yusuf, Apr. 2, 1939, p. 7.

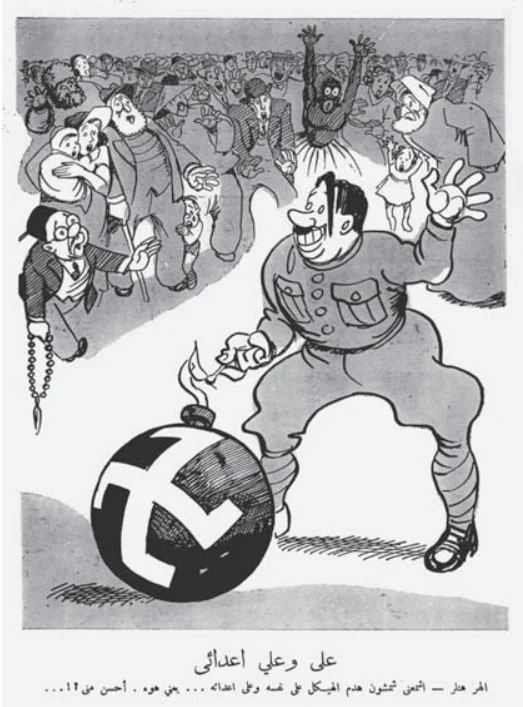
"Upon Me and Upon My Enemies." Herr Hitler: "Could Samson have brought the temple down on his enemies and I cannot? ... Is he better than I?!" Ruz al-Yusuf. October 2, 1938. p. 10

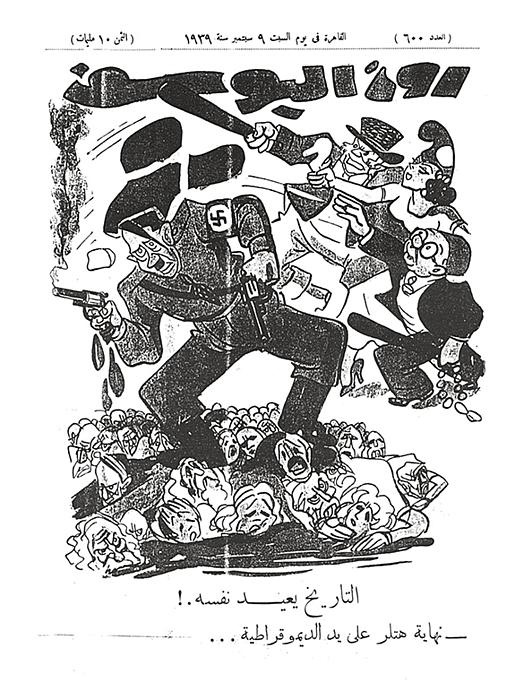
Ruz al-Yusuf reacting to the outbreak of the Second World War. "History repeats itself: The end of Hitler at the hands of democracy." Britain, France, and Egypt portrayed as Allied Forces against Nazi Germany. September 9, 1939.

"Who are these Aryans who boast of Aryan origin? After all, the Arab and Persian peoples—Egyptians, Iraqis, Syrians, Palestinians, Iranians—who are assumed not be Aryan are the ones who brought civilization as we know it to the world. These peoples lighted the human path to life, and from them the three monotheistic religions emerged, religions that the so-called Aryans accept and believe. So what is the advantage of these Aryan nations over them?"

Taha Hussein, the famous Egyptian academic and twenty-one time Nobel Prize in Literature nominee, criticized the lack of freedom of thought in Nazi Germany, writing "They live like a society of insects. They must behave like ants in an anthill or like bees in a hive." He criticized Egypt's pro-Allied neutrality stance and called for direct participation in the war against Germany. In a 1940 review of Hermann Rauschning's Hitler Speaks, Hussein wrote:

"Hitler is an intellectually limited man who does not like to delve deeply into problems or to reflect in any depth. He hates books and culture, he is superbly ignorant about what science and experience could offer him, and he resorts only to wild fantasies that have no precise aim. He has only contempt for philosophers, politicians, and thinkers ... It is for that reason that he wants to give it the means to crush all resistance, wherever it may come from. The individual exists only insofar as he places himself in the service of the German people. What does it matter if he suffers from hunger, thirst, woes of every kind? What does it matter if he is sacrificed, if he dies or is subjected to a thousand atrocities, provided the Hitlerian regime takes root in Germany? What does it matter if millions of others are also sacrificed so that German domination of the world can be established? .... I give thanks to God that I did not wait until the declaration of war to hate Hitler and his regime. In fact, I have hated them both since they made their appearance; I have resisted them with all my strength. I have always envisioned Hitler as a man whose conscience drips with blood, who considers nothing respectable or sacred, an enemy of the spirit, of humanity, of all the ideals of civilization. And now his acts and words confirm in everyone’s eyes what I had understood from the beginning of his fateful rise. It is therefore a duty more than a right for anyone who believes in spiritual, moral, and religious values, and in liberty, to stand up as the adversary of that man and that regime, and to mobilize every resource against both so that humanity may one day recover its civilization intact and its conscience in integrity.

Political cartoons of Mussolini and Hitler "combined an overall message of menace and threat with one of ridicule and clownishness". Both the Italian and German legation in Egypt complained to the Egyptian Ministry of Foreign Affairs about "allegedly absurd caricatures of the Duce and the Führer in certain Egyptian weekly reviews".

=== Egyptian Socialists ===
The Egyptian left were motivated and encouraged by the Soviet Union's fight against Nazi Germany. The Democratic Movement for National Liberation, founded by Henri Curiel and Iskra, founded by Hillel Schwartz used the economic and political condition of Egypt to spread Marxism.

== Material support ==
Despite not supplying troops on the frontlines, the Egyptian government were a key supporter of the British government during the war. The Egyptian government constructed the military barracks for the British troops, at the cost of 12 million Egyptian Pounds (EP), and fortifications and defense lines at 45,000,000 EP.

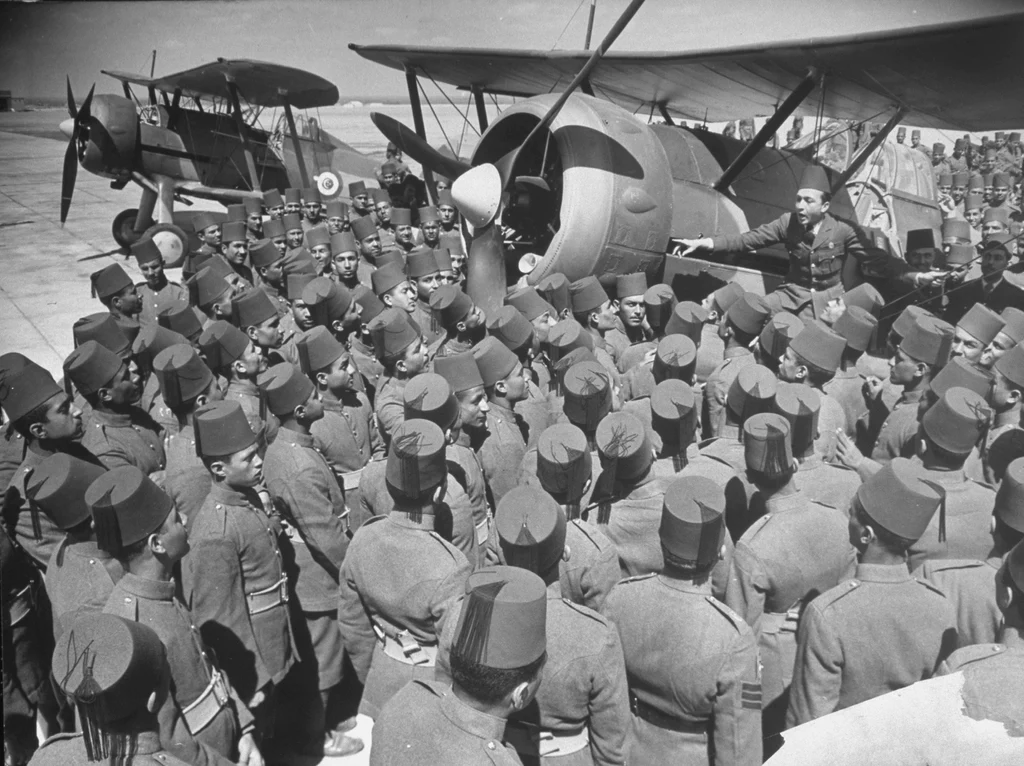
Egyptian flying instructor lecturing soldiers about Gladiators. 1940

The Egyptian military played a supportive role for the British during the war. It was Egyptian soldiers who received the first attack when Italy invaded in September 1940. Egyptian anti-air support helped defend Egypt from Axis air raids on the Suez Canal. The German air force dropped anti-naval mines on the canal to sink British ships. Egyptian troops were posted along the Canal every 200 meters in order to keep watch, remove and destroy anti-naval mines dropped by the Axis planes. The army was also involved in training British forces in joint exercises, with some British officers remarking that the Egyptian army saved them two divisions. The Egyptian army suffered 1,125 fatalities and 1,308 injuries in the war.

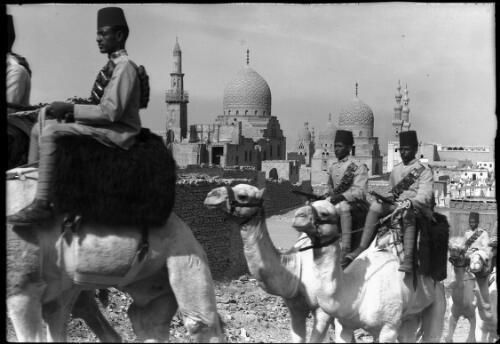
Egyptian Camel Corps. 1942

The Egyptian navy was involved in transporting troops, ammunition and other supplies, wounded and prisoners of war. In addition, they participated in rescue missions to the Allied naval fleets. Egyptian military intelligence collected intel on the Axis from nomadic tribes across the Egyptian-Libyan border for the Allies. Responsibility for guarding prisoners of war was transferred to the Egyptian army, who collected, deported and guarded the prisoners.

Despite only having been created in 1937, the Egyptian Royal Air Force took part in defending the country. When the British Air Force encountered a shortage of pilots, Egyptian pilots took their place. A report published by the military delegation to Egypt in 1945, mentioned that in taking over the administration of the air power, the Egyptian army had saved Britain a thousand men that were deployed elsewhere in other areas. All engineers and pilots of Egypt Air, the commercial Egyptian Airline, joined the ranks of the British Forces. When British planes would crash in desert areas or other uninhabited locations, the responsibility of finding the aircraft and missing pilots fell on the Egyptian Camel Corps. Egyptian engineers were involved in de-mining fields, establishing and maintaining water pipelines between Sidi Abdel Qader and Mersa Matruh, so clean water was available to the Allied Forces, and also laying railroads tracks across the Western desert.

Egypt supplied over 65,000 tons of wheat and maize, 6,000 tons of corn, 4,000 tons of barley, 800 tons of wheat bran, 68,003 tons of sugar and 107,679 tons of rice. The Egyptian Agency for Land Survey also provided a vital role in mapping out the land for the British. The agency undertook geological and topographical studies of terrain and climate conditions, and valuable projects for water resources in the desert such as digging wells and testing the water for soldiers to be deployed to these areas. In total, the government prepared 2,739,678 maps for the entire British army. The government also printed 669,060 banknotes for the National Bank of Egypt, which were used to purchase supplies for the British but were never paid back, eventually leading to a financial crisis. It also printed millions of stamps for the governments of Iraq, Syria and eastern Jordan; and around a million and a half consular stamps for the Greek government in exile in Egypt, as well as 17 million Syrian banknotes of various denominations that were needed for the Allies. The Egyptian medical industry was utilized by the Allies to treat injured Allied soldiers and fight diseases.

== Italian invasion ==
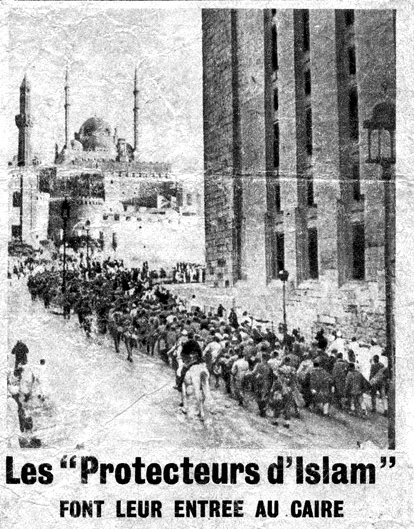
"The Protectors of Islam enter Cairo". British propaganda newspaper showing captured Italian troops under British guard marching into Cairo, January 1942.

The Italian invasion of Egypt (13–18 September 1940), began as a limited tactical operation towards Mersa Matruh, rather than for the strategic objectives sketched in Rome, due to the chronic lack of transport, fuel and wireless equipment, even with transfers from the 5th Army. Musaid was subjected to a "spectacular" artillery bombardment at dawn and occupied. The British withdrew past Buq Buq on 14 September but continued to harass the Italian advance. The British continued to fall back, going to Alam Hamid on the 15th and Alam el Dab on the 16th. An Italian force of fifty tanks attempted a flanking move, which led the British rearguard to retire east of Sidi Barrani. Graziani halted the advance.

Despite prodding from Mussolini, the Italians dug in around Sidi Barrani and Sofafi, about 80 mi (130 km) west of the British defences at Mersa Matruh. The British anticipated that the Italian advance would stop at Sidi Barrani and Sofafi and began to observe the positions. British naval and air operations continued to harass the Italian army as the 7th Armoured Division prepared to confront an advance on Matruh.

=== Italian defeat ===
Selby Force guarded the eastern approaches to Sidi Barrani, as the rest of the WDF attacked the fortified camps further inland. On 10 December, the 4th Armoured Brigade, which had been screening the attackers from a possible Italian counter-attack from the west, advanced northwards, cut the coast road between Sidi Barrani and Buq Buq, and sent armoured car patrols westwards. The 7th Armoured Brigade remained in reserve, and the 7th Support Group blocked an approach from Rabia and Sofafi to the south.

The 16th Brigade, supported by a squadron of Matilda II tanks, RAF aircraft, Royal Navy ships, and artillery fire, started its advance at 9:00 a.m.. The fighting continued for many hours, without substantial gains, until 1:30 p.m., when the Blackshirts holding two strongholds on the western side suddenly surrendered. The brigade continued advancing with the last of the Infantry tanks, an extra infantry battalion, and support from the 2nd Royal Tank Regiment.

The second attack began just after 4:00 p.m.. Italian artillery opened fire on the infantry as they were dismounting. The last ten Matildas drove into the western face of the Sidi Barrani defences, and although they were met by Italian artillery, it was ineffective. At 6:00 p.m., approximately 2,000 Blackshirts surrendered. In two hours, the first objectives had been captured; only a sector 2 mi (4 km) east of the harbour, held by a Blackshirt legion and the remains of the 1st Libyan Division, was still resisting. The British continued advancing until they reached Mersa Brega by February, 1941.

== German intervention ==
Adolf Hitler sent his army to North Africa starting in February 1941 (see Operation Sonnenblume). Nazi Germany's General Erwin Rommel's Deutsches Afrikakorps coming from victories at Tobruk in Libya, and in a classic blitzkrieg, comprehensively outfought British forces. Within weeks the British had been pushed back into Egypt. It was during this time that Einsatzgruppe Egypt, a Nazi SS unit, was founded with the purpose of genociding the Jews of Egypt and Palestine, though it never left for Egypt.

=== German defeat ===
Rommel's offensive was eventually stopped at the small railway halt of El Alamein, 150 miles from Cairo. In July 1942 Rommel lost the First Battle of El Alamein, largely due to the problem of an extended supply line which troubled both sides throughout the war in Egypt. The British were now very close to their supplies and had fresh troops on hand. In early September 1942 Rommel tried again to break through the British lines during the Battle of Alam el Halfa. He was decisively stopped by the newly arrived British commander, Lieutenant General Bernard Montgomery.

With British forces from Malta interdicting his supplies at sea, and the massive distances they had to cover in the desert, Rommel could not hold the El Alamein position forever. Still, it took a large set piece battle from late October to early November 1942, the Second Battle of El Alamein, to defeat the Germans forcing them to retreat westwards towards Libya and Tunisia.

=== Egyptian participation ===
Although Egypt remained formally neutral, its forces formed part of the British Military Operations Zone and some British forces were stationed there, many Egyptian Army units also fought alongside them. Some units like 9th, 10th, 11th and 12th Infantry Regiments, 16th and 12th Cavalry Regiments, 17th Horse Artillery Regiment, and 22nd King's Own Artillery Regiment. Some other units also fought but its names are unknown. Beside these units, the Anti-Aircraft Artillery Regiments all over Egypt played a vital role in destroying Luftwaffe attacks on Alexandria, Cairo, Suez, and Northern Delta.

== Allied victory ==
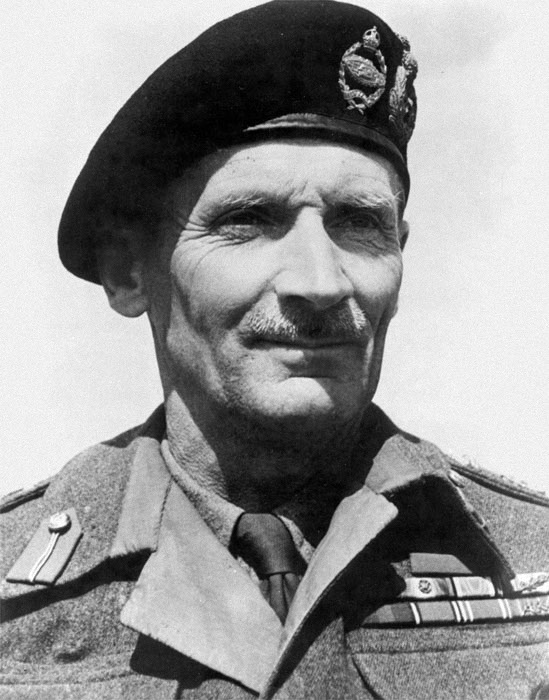
British General Bernard Law Montgomery, victor of El Alamein

The leadership of the United Kingdom's General Bernard Montgomery at the Second Battle of El Alamein, or the Battle of Alamein, marked a significant turning point of World War II and was the first major victory by British Commonwealth forces over the German Army. The battle lasted from 23 October to 3 November 1942. Following the First Battle of El Alamein, which had stalled the Axis advance, Montgomery took command of the Eighth Army from Claude Auchinleck in August 1942. Success in the battle turned the tide in the North African campaign. Some historians believe that the battle, along with the Battle of Stalingrad, were the two major Allied victories that contributed to the eventual defeat of Nazi Germany.

By July 1942, the German Afrika Korps under General Rommel had struck deep into Egypt, threatening the vital Allied supply line across the Suez Canal. Faced with overextended supply lines and lack of reinforcements and yet well aware of massive Allied reinforcements arriving, Rommel decided to strike at the Allies while their build-up was still not complete. This attack on 30 August 1942 at Alam Halfa failed, and expecting a counterattack by Montgomery's Eighth Army, the Afrika Korps dug in. After six more weeks of building up forces, the Eighth Army was ready to strike. 200,000 men and 1,000 tanks under Montgomery made their move against the 100,000 men and 500 tanks of the Afrika Korps.

=== The Allied plan ===
With Operation Lightfoot, Montgomery hoped to cut two corridors through the Axis minefields in the north. Armour would then pass through and defeat the German armour. Diversionary attacks in the south would keep the rest of the Axis forces from moving northwards. Montgomery expected a twelve-day battle in three stages — "The break-in, the dog-fight and the final break of the enemy."

The Commonwealth forces practised a number of deceptions in the months prior to the battle to wrong-foot the Axis command, not only as to the exact whereabouts of the forthcoming battle, but as to when the battle was likely to occur. This operation was codenamed, Operation Bertram. A dummy pipeline was built, stage by stage, the construction of which would lead the Axis to believe the attack would occur much later than it in fact did, and much further south. To further the illusion, dummy tanks made of plywood frames placed over jeeps were constructed and deployed in the south. In a reverse feint, the tanks for battle in the north were disguised as supply lorries by placing a removable plywood superstructure over them.

The Axis were dug-in along two lines, called by the Allies the Oxalic Line and the Pierson Line. They had laid around half a million mines, mainly anti-tank, in what was called the Devil's gardens.

=== The battle ===
'Fight for Egypt', 1943 film about the battle

The battle opened at 21:40 hours on 23 October with a sustained artillery barrage. The initial objective was the Oxalic Line with the armour intending to advance over this and on to the Pierson Line. However, the minefields were not yet fully cleared when the assault began.

On the first night, the assault to create the northern corridor fell three miles short of the Pierson line. Further south, they had made better progress but were stalled at Miteirya Ridge.

On 24 October, the Axis commander, General Stumme (Rommel was on sick leave in Austria), died of a heart attack while under fire. After a period of confusion, while Stumme's body was missing, General Ritter von Thoma took command of the Axis forces. Hitler initially instructed Rommel to remain at home and continue his convalescence but then became alarmed at the deteriorating situation and asked Rommel to return to Africa if he felt able. Rommel left at once and arrived on 25 October.

For the Allies in the south, after another abortive assault on the Miteirya Ridge, the attack was abandoned. Montgomery switched the focus of the attack to the north. There was a successful night attack over the 25–26th. Rommel's immediate counter-attack was without success. The Allies had lost 6,200 men against Axis losses of 2,500, but while Rommel had only 370 tanks fit for action, Montgomery still had over 900.

Montgomery felt that the offensive was losing momentum and decided to regroup. There were a number of small actions but, by 29 October, the Axis line was still intact. Montgomery was still confident and prepared his forces for Operation Supercharge. The endless small operations and the attrition by the Allied airforce had by then reduced Rommel's effective tank strength to only 102.

The second major Allied offensive of the battle was along the coast, initially to capture the Rahman Track and then take the high ground at Tel el Aqqaqir. The attack began on 2 November 1942. By the 3rd, Rommel had only 35 tanks fit for action. Despite containing the Allied advance, the pressure on his forces made a retreat necessary. However, the same day Rommel received a "victory or death" message from Hitler, halting the withdrawal. But the Allied pressure was too great, and the German forces had to withdraw on the night of 3–4 November. By 6 November, the Axis forces were in full retreat and over 30,000 soldiers had surrendered.

=== Aftermath ===
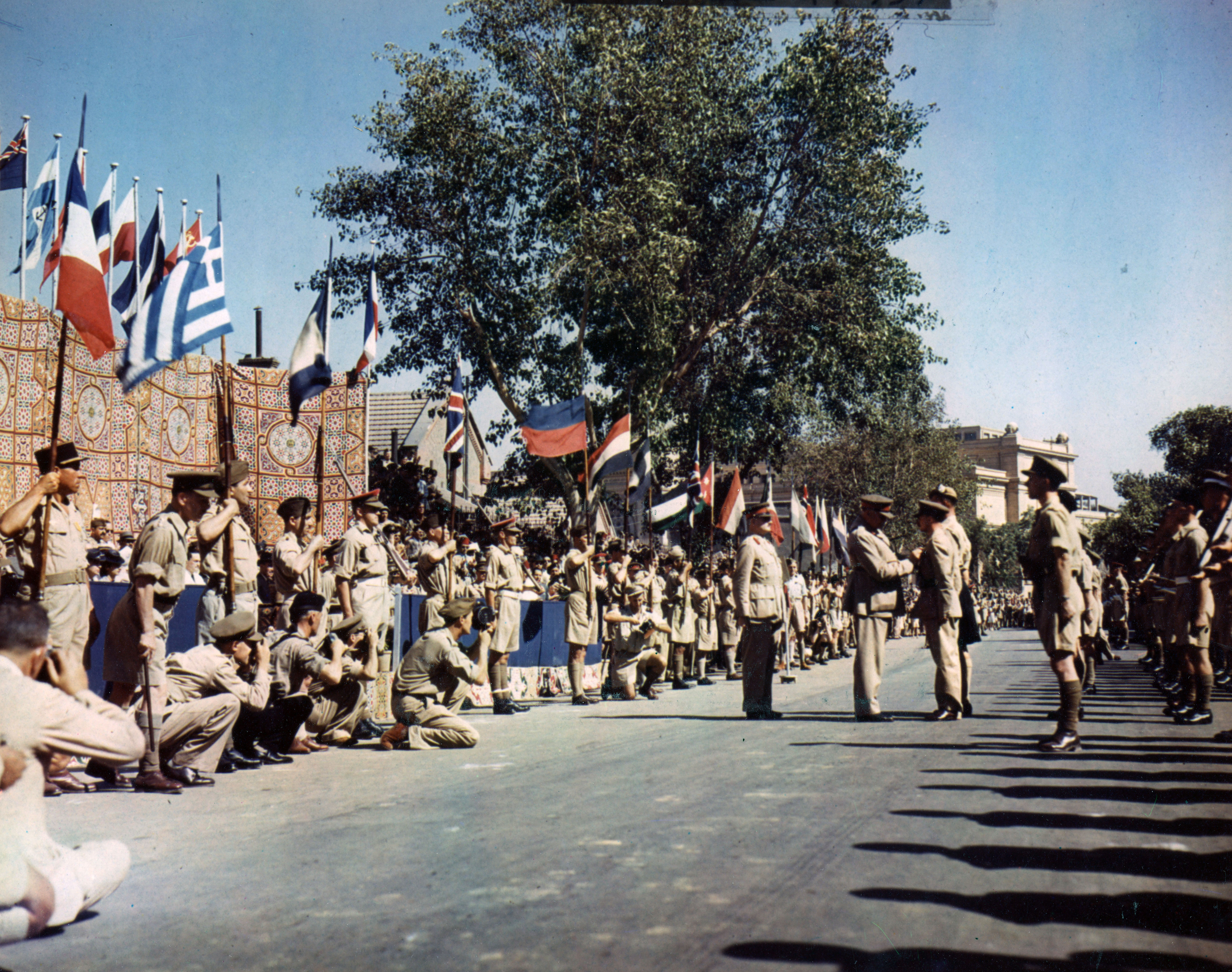
Formation of British and Egyptian soldiers holding flags of all nations, while officers of the British and Egyptian Army are giving out decorations. 1943

==== Churchill's summation ====
Winston Churchill famously summed up the battle on 10 November 1942 with the words, "now this is not the end, it is not even the beginning of the end. But it is, perhaps, the end of the beginning".

The battle was Montgomery's greatest triumph. He took the title "Viscount Montgomery of Alamein" when he was raised to the peerage.

The Torch landings in Morocco later that month marked the effective end of the Axis threat in North Africa.

== Egyptian fleet damages ==
In total, 14 Egyptian ships were sunk during the war by U-boats, those included: one ship sunk by German submarine U-83, three ships sunk, and one survived with damage by German submarine U-77, nine ships sunk by German submarine U-81.

Date	Ship	sunk/damaged by	Tonnage	Fate
16 April 1942	Bab el Farag	U-81	105	Sunk
16 April 1942	Fatouhel el Rahman	U-81	97	Sunk
19 April 1942	Hefz el Rahman	U-81	90	Sunk
22 April 1942	Aziza	U-81	100	Sunk
11 February 1943	Al Kasbanah	U-81	110	Sunk
11 February 1943	Sabah al Kheir	U-81	36	Sunk
20 March 1943	Bourgheih	U-81	244	Sunk
28 March 1943	Rouisdi	U-81	133	Sunk
25 June 1943	Nisr	U-81	80	Sunk
8 June 1942	Said	U-83	231	Sunk
30 July 1942	Fany	U-77	43	Sunk
1 August 1942	St. Simon	U-77	100	Sunk
6 August 1942	Adnan	U-77	155	Damaged
6 August 1942	Ezzet	U-77	158	Sunk

== See also ==
- Military history of the British Commonwealth in the Second World War
- Egypt in the Middle Ages

== Sources ==
=== English ===
- Aboul-Enein, Youssef Basil; Aboul-Enein, Basil H. (2013). "Egypt's Internal Struggle: To Declare War or Not?". The Secret War for the Middle East: The Influence of Axis and Allied Intelligence Operations during World War II. Annapolis, Maryland: Naval Institute Press. ISBN 9781612513362.
- Baram, Phillip (1978). "Undermining the British: Department of State Policies in Egypt and the Suez Canal Before and During World War II". The Historian. 40 (4): 631–649. doi:10.1111/j.1540-6563.1978.tb01543.x. ISSN 0018-2370. JSTOR 24444975.
- Cooper, Artemis (1989). Cairo in the War: 1939–1945. Hamish Hamilton Ltd. ISBN 978-1-84854-885-5.
- El Mallakh, Ragaei W. (1955). The Effects of the Second World War on the Economic Development of Egypt (Thesis). Rutgers University.
- Gershoni, Israel (2010). Confronting Fascism in Egypt: Dictatorship versus Democracy in the 1930s. Stanford University Press. ISBN 978-0-8047-6343-1.
- Helal, Emad (2010). "Egypt's Overlooked Contribution to World War II". The World in World Wars: Experiences, Perceptions and Perspectives from Africa and Asia. Vol. 5. Koninklijke Brill. pp. 217–247. ISBN 978-90-04-18545-6.
- MacGregor, Andrew (2006). "Europe's Battleground: Egypt in the Second World War". A military history of modern Egypt: from the Ottoman Conquest to the Ramadan War. Praeger Security International General Interest. ISBN 9780275986018.
- Morewood, Steven (2005). The British Defence of Egypt 1935–1940: Conflict and crisis in the Eastern Mediterranean. Frank Cass. ISBN 978-0714649436.
- Morsy, Laila Amin (1994). "Indicative cases of Britain's wartime policy in Egypt, 1942–44". Middle Eastern Studies. 30 (1): 91–122. doi:10.1080/00263209408700985. JSTOR 4283617.
- ———————— (1989). "Britain's Wartime Policy in Egypt, 1940–42". Middle Eastern Studies. 25 (1): 64–94. doi:10.1080/00263208908700768. JSTOR 4283285.
- Lugol, Jean (1945). Egypt and World War II: The Anti-axis Campaigns in the Middle East. Société orientale de publicité.
- Lucas, Phillips (1972). Alamein. Pan Books. ISBN 9780330300117.
- Rothwell, Steve (1998). "Military Ally or Liability: The Egyptian Army 1936–1942". Army Quarterly and Defence Journal. 128 (2).
- Schewe, Eric Andrew (2014). State of Siege: The Development of the Security State in Egypt during the Second World War (Thesis). University of Michigan.
- Smith, Charles D. (1979). "4 February 1942: Its Causes and Its Influence on Egyptian Politics and on the Future of Anglo-Egyptian Relations, 1937–1945". International Journal of Middle East Studies. 10 (4). Cambridge University Press: 453–479. doi:10.1017/s0020743800051291. ISSN 0020-7438. JSTOR 162213. OCLC 1226911. S2CID 154143856.
- Tripp, Charles (1993). "Ali Mahir and the politics of the Egyptian army, 1936–1942". Contemporary Egypt: Through Egyptian eyes. Routledge. pp. 45–71. ISBN 9780203413166.
- Vitalis, Robert (1996). "The "New Deal" in Egypt: The Rise of Anglo-American Commercial Competition in World War II and the Fall of Neocolonialism". Diplomatic History. 20 (2): 211–239. doi:10.1111/j.1467-7709.1996.tb00623.x. ISSN 0145-2096. JSTOR 24913377.
- Warburg, Gabriel (1975). "Lampson's ultimatum to Faruq, 4 February 1942". Middle Eastern Studies. 11 (1). London: Cass Taylor & Francis: 24–32. doi:10.1080/00263207508700285. ISSN 1743-7881. JSTOR 4282554. OCLC 237511833.
- Wichhart, Stefanie (2022). Britain, Egypt, and Iraq during World War II: The Decline of Imperial Power in the Middle East. I.B. Tauris. ISBN 9780755644193.
- Wichhart, Stefanie Katharine (2007). Intervention: Britain, Egypt, and Iraq during World War II (Thesis). University of Texas at Austin.

=== Arabic ===
- Arab, Mohamed Samer; الشروق, دار (2016). 4 فبراير 1942 [February 4, 1942]. Dar Shorouq. ISBN 9789770932391.
- Dessouki, Assem; الشروق, دار (1981). مصر فى الحرب العالمية الثانية، 1939-1945 [Egypt in World War II, 1939–1945]. لقاهره: دارالكتاب الجامعي.
- Jassim, Intidhar Hadi; Mohammed, Qabass Natiq (2022). "The Role of Egyptian Workers in World War II". Journal of the College of Education for Women. 33 (4). University of Baghdad: 29–41. doi:10.36231/coedw.v33i4.1628. ISSN 2663-547X.
- Ramadan, Abdel-Azim; Rizk, Younan Labib; El-Masadi, Mohammad Gamal El-Din (1978). مصر والحرب العالمية الثانية [Egypt and World War II]. Al-Ahram Center for Political and Strategic Studies.
