= Diana Campbell (curator) =

American curator

- Education: Princeton University
- Occupation: Curator

Diana Campbell Betancourt is an American curator and writer. She is the Artistic Director of the Samdani Art Foundation and Chief Curator of the Dhaka Art Summit in Bangladesh, and Head of Global Initiatives at the Hartwig Art Foundation in Amsterdam. In 2025, she was ranked 15th on ArtReview's Power 100 list of the most influential figures in contemporary art.

== Career ==
Campbell chaired the board of the Mumbai Art Room, has been a research fellow at the Henry Moore Institute, the Fukuoka Asian Art Museum and the FRAC Champagne-Ardenne, and has collaborated with sculpture parks including Yorkshire Sculpture Park, de Cordova, and Wanas Konst on commissions of Indian sculpture. She was a nominee for the 2016 Independent Curators International Independent Vision Curatorial Award.

Dhaka Art Summit and Samdani Art Foundation

Diana Campbell has developed the Dhaka Art Summit to be the world's leading research and exhibitions platform for art from South Asia, by bringing together artists, architects, curators, and writers from across South Asia and through a largely commission based model where new work and exhibitions are born in Bangladesh. She has curated numerous solo projects with artists such as Raqib Shaw (co-curated with Maria Balshaw) Haroon Mirza, Simryn Gill, Tino Sehgal, Lynda Benglis, Shilpa Gupta, Shahzia Sikander, Naeem Mohaiemen, Runa Islam, Shumon Ahmed, Pawel Althamer, Asim Waqif, Antony Gormley and Raqs Media Collective. Campbell has conceived of the Dhaka Art Summit as a cumulative event, stressing that it is 'not about the individual editions; it is a continuation, and it always builds on the last one'. The 2018 edition featured a transnational think tank program connecting modern art histories in and across Africa, South and Southeast Asia in collaboration with the Getty Foundation, Cornell University Center for Comparative Modernities, the Asia Art Archive, and the Samdani Art Foundation which convened in Hong Kong and Dhaka in 2019 and 2020. The 2020 and 2023 editions had nearly 500,000 visitors over nine days making it one of the most visited exhibitions in the world.

Bellas Artes Projects

From 2016 to 2018, Campbell served as the founding artistic director of Bellas Artes Projects, a production-based residency program and exhibition space in Bagac, Bataan and Manila, Philippines under the patronage of Jam Acuzar. She developed commission-based projects involving collaborations between artists and artisans. She produced and curated critically acclaimed exhibitions by Carlos Amorales, Paul Pfeiffer, Isabel and Alfredo Aquilizan, Cian Dayrit, Stefanos Tsivopoulos, as well as the first major solo exhibition in Asia of the late American artist Bruce Conner.

Frieze London

Campbell was appointed the curator of Frieze Projects for Frieze London 2018 and 2019, overseeing the artist award commission by Alex Baczinski-Jenkins and Himali Singh Soin, the Film Program, and LIVE.

DesertX

In 2023, Campbell was co-curator of the fourth edition of Desert X in California's Coachella Valley, alongside Artistic Director Neville Wakefield. The exhibition featured 11 artists and presented large-scale outdoor, site-specific projects across the desert landscape, including works by Rana Begum, Torkwase Dyson, Mario García Torres, Tschabalala Self and Marina Tabassum.

Bukhara Biennial

In 2025, Campbell served as Artistic Director of the inaugural edition of Bukhara Biennial in Bukhara, Uzbekistan. The Bukhara Biennial was commissioned by Gayane Umerova, Chairperson of the Uzbekistan Art and Culture Development Foundation (ACDF). The first edition, titled ''Recipes for Broken Hearts'', took place from September to November 2025 across historic sites in the city. It presented more than 70 newly commissioned, site-specific works, developed through collaboration between artists and Uzbek artisans. Campbell brought together more than 160 artists, craftspeople and chefs for the programme, which incorporated contemporary art, craft, architecture, performance, poetry and culinary practices. The biennial attracted approximately 1.8 million visitors.

Hartwig Art Foundation

Campbell serves as the Head of Global Initiatives at the Hartwig Art Foundation in Amsterdam. The foundation is developing the Hartwig Art Museum in Amsterdam's Zuid neighbourhood, scheduled to open in 2028.

== Recognition ==
In 2026, Campbell was one of the Art Basel Award recipients in the Curators category in recognition of her curatorial work.

She has been recognized by ArtReview, Artnet News, and Artnews for her development of the Samdani Art Foundation collection into one of the leading collections in the world.

Her work developing the Bangladeshi art scene with patrons Nadia and Rajeeb Samdani placed them jointly on the ArtReview Power100 list of the most influential figures in the contemporary art world between 2019 and 2023.
