= Dhaka Art Summit =

Art summit in Dhaka, Bangladesh

Dhaka Art Summit ঢাকা আর্ট সামিট
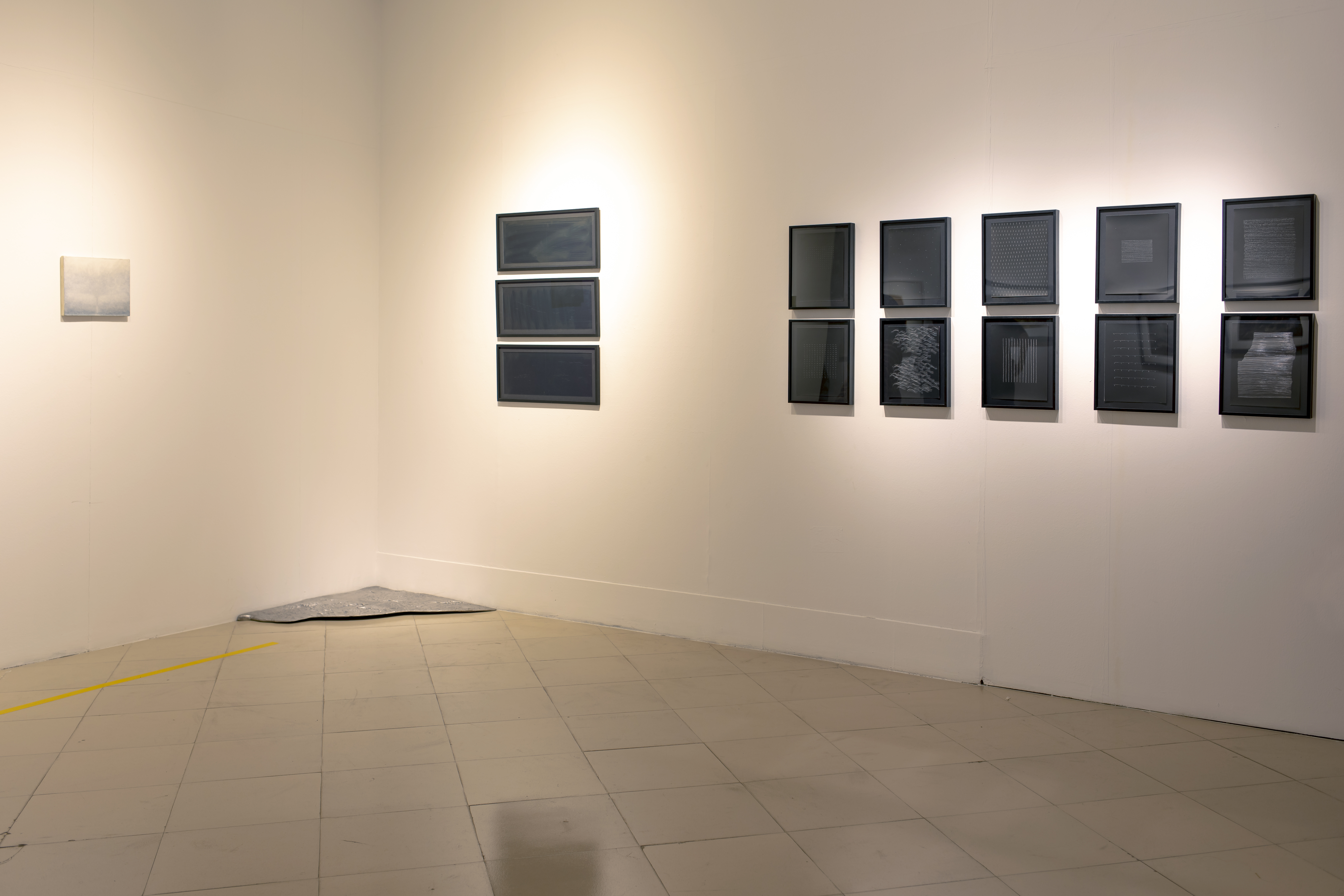
- Dhaka Art Summit 2023
- Status: Actice
- Genre: Contemporary art, architecture and research summit
- Frequency: Biennial
- Venue: Bangladesh Shilpakala Academy
- Location: Dhaka
- Country: Bangladesh
- Inaugurated: 2012
- Founder: Nadia Samdani MBE; Rajeeb Samdani
- Most recent: 2023
- Participants: 160+ (2023)
- Attendance: 500,000+ (2023)
- Area: South Asia
- Major events: Exhibitions, screenings, conferences, workshops and research initiatives
- Patrons: Artists, architects, curators, writers, researchers and the general public
- Organizer: Samdani Art Foundation

Dhaka Art Summit is an art summit held in Dhaka, Bangladesh and is organised by Samdani Art Foundation, a non- profit art trust founded by Nadia Samdani MBE and Rajeeb Samdani in 2011.

== History ==
The Dhaka Art Summit (DAS) is a non-commercial research and exhibition platform for art and architecture in South Asia, organised every two years by the Samdani Art Foundation in Dhaka, Bangladesh. Since its launch in 2012, the summit has evolved from a platform primarily for Bangladeshi artists into one of the largest international gatherings for contemporary art in South Asia, with a particular focus on new commissions and cross-disciplinary collaborations.

Unlike art fairs, the Dhaka Art Summit does not involve sales and is free to the public.

The summit is recognised for commissioning ambitious new works by Bangladeshi and international artists, often on themes connected to climate change, migration, identity, and South Asia’s cultural histories. It is now considered one of the most significant art events in the Global South, drawing more than half a million visitors in recent editions.

Title	Date	Director	Artists	Visitors	Ref
1st Dhaka Art Summit 2012	12–15 April 2012		200	50,000	
2nd Dhaka Art Summit 2014	7–9 February 2014	Diana Campbell Betancourt	250	70,000	
3rd Dhaka Art Summit 2016	5–8 February 2016	Diana Campbell Betancourt	300	138,000	
4th Dhaka Art Summit 2018	2-10 February 2018	Diana Campbell Betancourt	350	317,000	
5th Dhaka Art Summit 2020	7-15 February 2020	Diana Campbell Betancourt	500	500,000	
6th Dhaka Art Summit 2023	3-11 February 2023	Diana Campbell Betancourt	160+	500,000+	

== Editions ==
=== 2012 ===
The 1st edition of the Summit was held in collaboration with Shilpakala Academy and Bangladesh National Museum and showcased the works of 249 artists and 19 galleries. The 1st edition of the Summit focused only on the local artists and galleries. The Summit also organised talks.

Samdani Art Foundation also awarded the Samdani Artist Development Award to Khaled Hasan and Samdani Young Talent Award to Musrat Reazi at the closing ceremony of Dhaka Art Summit.

The award was judged by a panel of international judges that consisted of Kyla McDonald, Assistant Curator from Tate Modern Museum; Deepak Ananth, a professor at the Ecole des Beaux Arts in France; Elaine W. Ng, Editor and Publisher of Art Asia Pacific Magazine; Bose Krishnamachari, founder of Kochi Biennale; renowned artist Ravinder Reddy from India, and Paris-based Bangladeshi artist Shahabuddin Ahmed.

=== 2014 ===
The 2nd edition of Dhaka Art Summit took place in collaboration with Bangladesh Shilpakala Academy from 7 to 9 February 2014. From its 2nd edition onwards, the Summit decided to focus on South Asia. DAS 2014 featured a wide range of programmes including five curatorial exhibitions by international and Bangladeshi curators, 14 solo art projects curated by the artistic director of the Samdani Foundation Diana Campbell Betancourt that celebrated artists from across South Asia. The summit featured a citywide public art project, performances, screening of experimental films, speaker's panel and participation of 15 Bangladeshi and 17 South Asia focused galleries.

The Samdani Art Award was also presented to a young Bangladeshi artist Ayesha Sultana, during the Dhaka Art Summit, the winner was selected by an international jury panel which was chaired by Aaron Cezar (Director, Delfina Foundation) and included Adriano Pedrosa (Independent curator), Jessica Morgan (Daskalopoulos Curator, International Art, Tate Modern), Sandhini Poddar (Associate Curator, Guggenheim Museum) and Pooja Sood (Director, KHOJ India). The winning artist received a three-month residency at the Delfina Foundation in the United Kingdom.

=== 2016 ===
The 3rd edition of Dhaka Art Summit was held from 5 to 8 February 2016 in Dhaka. Seventeen Solo Projects, curated by Samdani Art Foundation Artistic Director Diana Campbell Betancourt, included thirteen newly commissioned works and three works reconfigured within the Bangladeshi context, reflecting the productive nature of DAS. The first DAS project commissioned by the Samdani Art Foundation, VIP Project (Dhaka) by Po Po, was first unveiled at the 8th Asia Pacific Triennial, 2015 in Brisbane. The solo projects celebrated pluralism and looked at the fluid continuum of birth and experience in becoming an individual, book-ended by Lynda Benglis and Tino Sehgal and with Shumon Ahmed, Tun Win Aung and Wah Nu, Simryn Gill, Waqas Khan, Shakuntala Kulkarni, Prabhavati Meppayil, Haroon Mirza, Amanullah Mojadidi, Sandeep Mukherjee, Po Po, Dayanita Singh, Ayesha Sultana and Christopher Kulendran Thomas, Munem Wasif and Mustafa Zaman.

This time in addition to new commissions and curated group exhibitions, DAS included talks, critical writing ensembles, performances, film programme, book launches and the Summit's first historical exhibition, Rewind and artists were Rashid Choudhury, Monika Correa, Germaine Krull, Nalini Malini, Anwar Jalal Shemza, Bagyi Aung Soe, and Lionel Wendt, among others. The Samdani Art Award finalists exhibition curated by Daniel Baumann (Director, Kunsthalle Zurich); The Missing One curated by Nada Raza (Research Curator, Tate Research Centre) and artists include Neha Choksi, Iftikhar Dadi, Shishir Bhattacharjee, Firoz Mahmud, Rohini Devasher, David Chalmers Alesworth, Mariam Suhail, Hajra Waheed, Himali Singh Soin among others; Architecture in Bangladesh curated by Aurelién Lemonier (Curator of Centre Pompidou); The Performance Pavilion Shifting Sands Shifting Hands, curated by Nikhil Chopra, Madhavi Gore and Jana Prepeluh; Not as far as it seems, a series of conversations and sound pieces curated by Safina Radio Project; a Film Programme curated by Shanay Jhaveri (Assistant Curator of South Asian Art, Metropolitan Museum of Art, New York); as well as Critical Writing Ensemble, panel discussions and children workshop conducted by VAST Bhutan.

The winner of the 2016 Samdani Art Award is Bangladeshi photographer Rasel Chowdhury. The jury panel consisted of Catherine David (Deputy Director, Centre Pompidou, Paris), Aaron Seeto (Curatorial Manager, Asian and Pacific Art, QAGOMA, Brisbane), Cosmin Costinas (Director, Para/Site Art Space, Hong Kong), and Beatrix Ruf (Director, Stedelijk Museum, Amsterdam), chaired by Aaron Cezar (Director of Delfina Foundation, UK). The award show was curated by Daniel Baumann, who is the Director of the Kunsthalle Zurich, Switzerland. The winning artist received a three-month residency at the Delfina Foundation in the United Kingdom.

=== 2018 ===
The 4th edition of Dhaka Art Summit took place from 2–10 February 2018 at the Bangladesh Shilpakala Academy. Directed by Diana Campbell Betancourt, it presented work by more than 350 artists, curators, and thinkers from South Asia and beyond.

The edition featured Bearing Points, a large-scale group exhibition curated by Diana Campbell Betancourt and 'A beast, a god, and a line' exhibition by Cosmin Costinas. It subsequently toured to TS1 Myanmar (Yangon), Parasite Hong Kong, MAIIAM Chiang Mai (Thailand), Kunsthall Trondheim (Norway), and Museum of Modern Art Warsaw (Poland).

Alongside exhibitions, DAS 2018 hosted the Critical Writing Ensembles, children’s programmes, education pavilion, film screenings, and panel discussions, strengthening its role as both an art and research platform. The event drew more than 317,000 visitors.

=== 2020 ===
The 5th edition of the Dhaka Art Summit, titled "Seismic Movements", was held from 7–15 February 2020 at Bangladesh Shilpakala Academy, Dhaka. Under Chief Curator Diana Campbell Betancourt, the nine-day summit emerged as the most ambitious edition to date, featuring participation from over 500 artists, curators, architects, scholars, thinkers, and representatives from more than 44 countries The exhibition revolved around layered notions of movement—geological shifts, colonial legacies, independence movements, social revolutions, feminist futures, and spatial mobilities—translated into immersive artworks, performances, installations, and discursive programming. A major highlight was Adrián Villar Rojas’s installation New Mutants, a floor-encrusted tableau of 400-million-year-old fossils, serving as a meditation on deep time and planetary precarity. The summit also featured a research installation titled "Geographies of the Imagination," curated by SAVVY Contemporary and Jothashilpa, which presented layered timelines of colonial and partition histories through cinema banner painting by Mohammad Shoaib, a veteran cinema banner painter, highlighting parallel legacies across Asia and Africa.

The Collective Body—curated by Diana Campbell and Kathryn Weir with assistant curator Kehkasha Sabah—brought together more than thirty collaborative, artist-led initiatives (around half from Bangladesh) to foreground community-rooted practices and cross-regional exchange across Asia, Africa, Central & South America, and Oceania. DAS 2020 also hosted MAHASSA (Modern Art Histories in and across Africa, South and Southeast Asia), a research collaboration between Dhaka Art Summit, Cornell University’s Institute for Comparative Modernities, and Asia Art Archive, supported by the Getty Foundation’s Connecting Art Histories initiative; its February 2020 Dhaka session featured seminars and panels on modern architecture, art schools, collectives, and more. Exhibition-making at DAS 2020 was shaped by Srijan-Abartan, a cross-cultural workshop for exhibition design led by common-interest (with support from Pro Helvetia) that developed ecologically sustainable, locally rooted display strategies for the Summit and published its process as open-access research.

=== 2023 ===
The sixth edition of the Dhaka Art Summit, titled বন্যা/Bonna, was held from 3 to 11 February 2023 at the Bangladesh Shilpakala Academy. The title, meaning "flood" in Bangla and also a common female name, served as a central metaphor for the exhibition's themes of fluidity, collective healing, and the transformative power of water in the context of the climate crisis and geopolitical challenges.

A major highlight was Very Small Feelings, co-commissioned with the Kiran Nadar Museum of Art in New Delhi, where the project later travelled. The summit also presented significant projects by artists such as Joydeb Roaja, Miet Warlop, Sumayya Vally, Ashfika Rahman, Antony Gormley, and Afrah Shafiq. The summit drew over 500,000 visitors during its nine-day run, maintaining its status as one of the most visited non-commercial art events globally

The edition featured around 120 Bangladeshi and international artists, architects, curators, and writers from across the Global South.

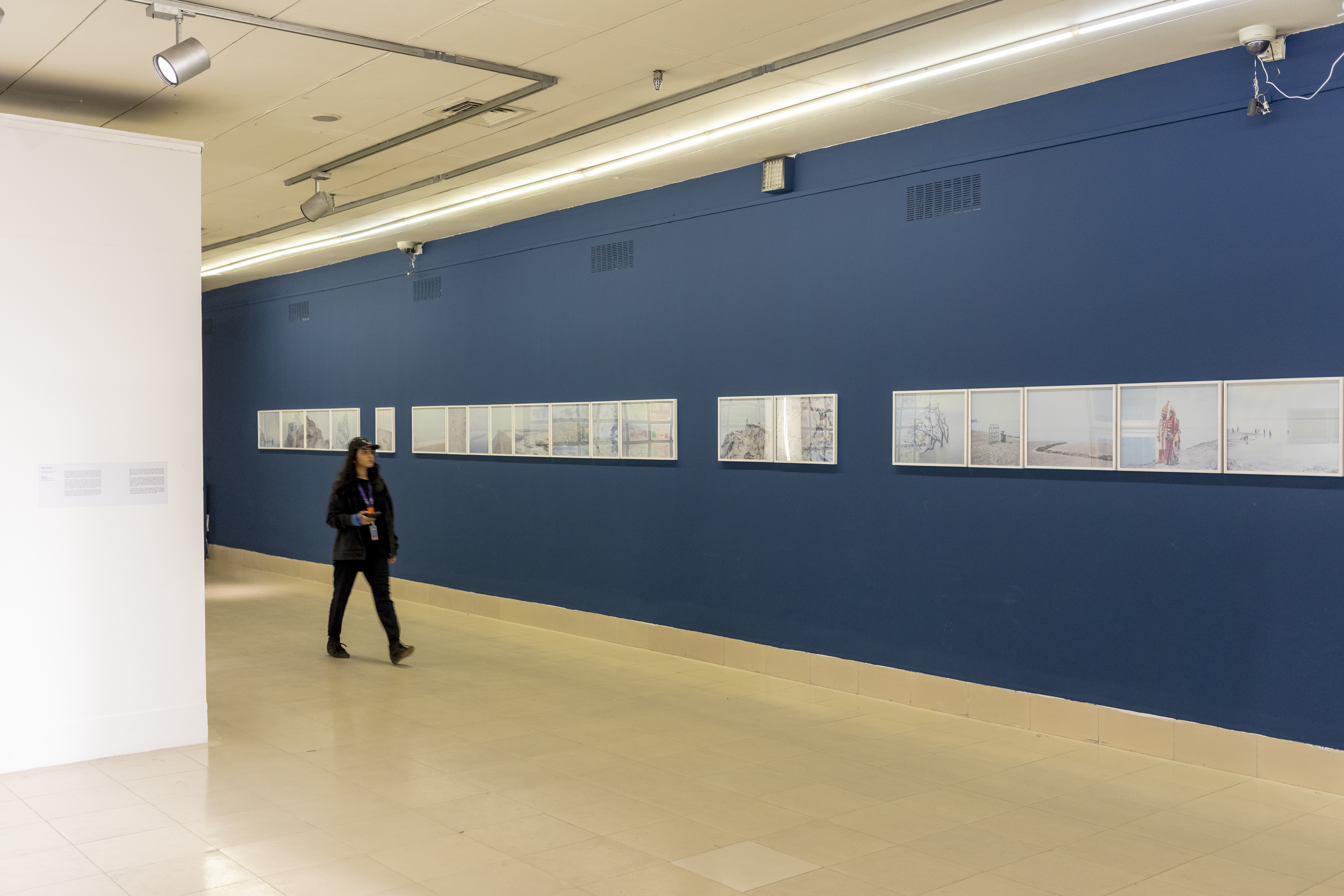
To Enter the Sky - Protick Sarker, Dhaka Art Summit 2023

== Controversies ==
Following the fall of Sheikh Hasina’s government on 5 August 2024, scrutiny increased over the political connections of the Dhaka Art Summit’s founders, Rajeeb and Nadia Samdani MBE. In September 2024, news reports alleged that the couple had established close ties with members of the Sheikh family, including Sheikh Rehana, through exhibitions organized during Mujib Year in collaboration with the Center for Research and Information.

Further allegations concerned the supply of high-value artworks by the Samdanis to political figures, including members of the Sheikh family. During unrest on 5 August 2024, properties associated with Sheikh Rehana and Salman F. Rahman were looted, resulting in the loss of valuable artworks. Speculation linked some of these works to prior transactions involving the Samdanis. Samdani Art Foundation rejected these allegation.
