= Seema (given name) =

- Pronunciation: Sanskrit: [siːma] Hindi: [siːma] Punjabi: [siːma]
- Gender: Female
- Language: Sanskrit

Origin
- Meaning: "limit", "boundary"

Other names
- Alternative spelling: Sima, Sema
- Related names: Aseem or Asim (male Sanskrit name for "unlimited", "limitless", or "infinite")

Seema also spelled Sima, Sema (Sanskrit: सीमा sīma) is an Indian feminine given name meaning 'limit/boundary/frontier'.

Notable people with the name include:

- Seema (actress) (born 1957), Indian film actress
- Seema (runner) (born 2001), Indian long-distance runner
- Seema Azmi, Indian cinema and theatre actress
- Seema Bisla (born 1993), Indian freestyle wrestler
- Seema Biswas (born 1965), Indian film and theatre actress
- Seema Bowri (born 1976), British-based actor
- Seema Desai (born 1981), Indian cricketer
- Seema Jaswal (born 1985), British presenter
- Seema Kennedy (born 1976), British Conservative Party Member of Parliament
- Seema Malhotra (born 1972), British Labour Party Member of Parliament
- Seema Mustafa (born 1955), Indian journalist
- Seema Pahwa, Indian soap opera actress
- Seema Parihar (born 1976), former bandit and member of the Samajwadi Party
- Seema Pujare (born 1976), Indian cricketer
- Seema Punia (born 1983), also known as Seema Antil, Indian discus thrower
- Seema Upadhyay (born 1965), Indian politician, belonging to Bahujan Samaj Party
- Seema Verma (born 1970), American health policy consultant and former administrator
