= Asim =

Asim or ASIM may refer to:

- Andromeda Spaceways Inflight Magazine, a fantasy and science fiction magazine
- Aseem, a male given name of Indian origin, often spelled Asim
- Asem, a male given name of Arabic origin, sometimes spelled Asim or Asım
- Asim Zeneli, Albanian partisan
- Asynchronous induction motor, a type of electric AC motor
- Atmosphere-Space Interactions Monitor, a project led by the European Space Agency

== See also ==
- Azim (disambiguation)
- Asem (disambiguation)
