= Aseem Pereira =

Brazilian sculptor

Aseem Pereira (born 24 August 1960) is a Brazilian artist. He migrated to Australia in 1990 where he studied Visual Arts at the Sydney College of the Arts.

== Work ==
Pereira was a glass artist in his early years. His work was published twice in New Glass Review by the Corning Museum of Glass. His work has included weaving recycled materials.

Pereira's work has appeared in exhibitions such as the 2002 Queue Here exhibition and also private collections in several countries. He participated in juried exhibitions in the visual arts domain in Australia, namely 'Sculpture by the Sea' in 2001, the 'City of Hobart Art Prize' in 2007, the 'Wynne Prize' 2007, and the Helen Lempriere National Sculpture Award 2008.
