= Rohini Devasher =

Indian contemporary artist (born 1978)

- Born: India
- Education: College of Art, New Delhi; Winchester School of Art, UK
- Known for: Contemporary art, printmaking, video art
- Notable work: Parts Unknown, Speculations from the Field
- Movement: Contemporary art
- Awards: Art India Skoda Breakthrough Artist Award (2012); Forbes Contemporary Artist of the Year (2014)

Rohini Devasher is an Indian contemporary artist known for her multimedia works that explore the intersections between art, science, astronomy, and ecology. Trained as a painter and printmaker, she combines drawing, video, and digital media to investigate natural systems, speculative futures, and the relationship between observation and imagination.

== Early life ==
Rohini Devasher received her MA in printmaking from the Winchester School of Art in the UK and her BFA in Painting from the College of Art in New Delhi. She was also the recipient of the Inlaks Fine Arts Award twice in the years 2007 and 2008. She was further granted the Sarai Associate Fellowship in 2009, instituted by the Centre for Study of Developing Societies, Delhi. Rohini is also a member of the Amateur Astronomers Association of Delhi (AAAD) in 1997.

In 2012, she was invited to a four-month residency this year at the Max Planck Institute in Berlin, where she worked alongside leading research scientists exploring similar themes of astronomy and science.

== Career ==
=== Early years ===
Rohini Devasher worked at the India Habitat Centre prior to her M.A. in the UK and returned to work at the Khoj International Artists’ Association between 2005 and 2010.

In 2009, Devasher opened her first solo ‘Breed’ at Project 88 in Mumbai. The exhibition consisted of digital prints, drawings and videos. Devasher's works explored the possibilities contained within nature, where organisms are born, breed and multiply. Her other exhibitions include Deep Time that opened at Khoj International Artists’ Association and Project 88 in Mumbai.

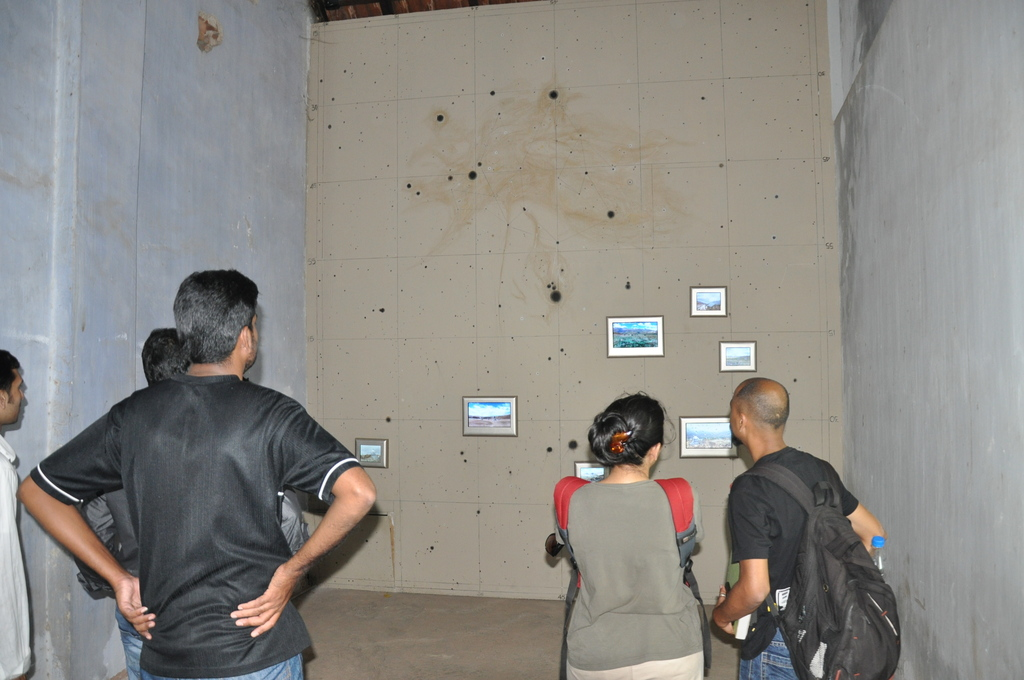
Parts Unknown at the exhibition

In 2012, Devasher participated in the inaugural Kochi Muziris Biennale curated by Krishnamachari Bose and Riyas Komu. In Aspinwall House, the main venue of the Kochi-Muziris Biennale Rohini Devasher’s seven- channel video work, Parts Unknown was installed. Devasher chose to create fictive landscapes up north in Ladakh, at the site of the Indian Astronomical Observatory (IAO) in Hanle, one of the world’s highest sites for optical, infrared and gamma-ray telescopes, that draws astronomers as much for the severe terrain as for the dramatic skies.

=== Speculations from the Field ===
Speculations from the field opened at the Dr Bhau Daji Lad Museum, Byculla (E) and was curated by Tasneem Zakaria Mehta, the director of the museum, and Himanshu Kadam, senior assistant curator. The show explores existentialist themes by looking at the place of humans in the universe, and the idea of time interacting with the museum’s collection of fossils from the Jurassic Period. The exhibition is a meditation on the intersection of deep sciences, geology and astronomy, art and perception. In the exhibition, Devasher also worked with the museum’s Philip’s Planisphere, made with embossed and gilded leather, from the early 20th century. The planisphere shows all the principal stars, and their position during every hour of the year. She has mapped the sky above the museum from the present to an imaginary future almost 20,000 years from the current year through 20 prints.

== Awards ==
In 2014, Devasher was named the Forbes Contemporary Artist of the Year. She was previously nominated and later announced as the recipient of the Art India Skoda Breakthrough Artist award in 2012.
