= Asim Hamdan =

Saudi researcher and historian

Asim Hamdan ali al-ghamdy (Arabic: عاصم حمدان علي الغامدي) was a Saudi researcher and historian. Born in Jeddah in 1953, he was one of the most influential historians, who wrote about Madinah in this century. He wrote in the Saudi Al Medina magazine. Also, he wrote in magazine columns "Memories from the Sefah" in the Arabian magazine. Asim also issued many other books between his work: (Old and Modern Literature in Medina's Environment), and (Al Aghawat District: Literary Image for Medina in the 14th Century AH).

He died at the age of 67, (Ramadan) 16 May 2020 in Madina, and was buried in Al-Baqi Cemetery.

== Education ==
- He received his education in Madinah.
- He received his bachelor's degree in Arabic language and literature in first class honor, from the Umm Al Qura University, in Mecca 1976.
- He received his doctorate in philosophy from the University of Manchester in 1986, his dissertation was titled: "The Literature of Medina in the 12th Century AH: A Critical Study Depending on the Contemporary Sources."

== Career ==
He worked as a teacher in the Arabic Language Department in King Abdulaziz University, in Jeddah.

He worked as a teacher assistant in Umm Al Qura University, in Mecca in 1979.

He worked as an editor in chief of student magazine issued for the Saudi student club, in London 1986.

He worked as a consultant for the minister of the Ministry of haj.

He worked as an editor in chief of "Haj Magazine" issued by the Ministry of Haj.

He worked as an editor in chief "Juthur Magazine" (translated title: Roots Magazine ) issued by the literary cultural club in Jeddah.

He wrote weekly in the "Al Medina" Magazine columns titled "Intellectual Vision", and another in English in "Arab News" Magazine titled "In Focus".

== Books ==
"The Zionist crusader conspiracy against Islam", issued by Muslim World League, in Mecca 1986.

"Medina Almounora Between Literature and History", issued by the Medina Literature Club,1991.

"Al Aghawat District: Literary Image for Medina in the 14th Century AH", issued by Dar Al-Qublah in Jeddah 1993.

"Almnakhah District: Literary Image for Medina in the 14th Century AH", issued by Dar Al-Qublah in Jeddah 1994.

"Ashjan Al Shamiyah: Literary Image for Mecca in the modern age", issued by Dar Al-Qublah in Jeddah 1996.

"A comparison study between the Arabic and the western literature", issued by Medina Literature Club, 1997.

"Memories from al-haswa", 1998.

"Old and Modern Literature in Medinas Environment", issued by Medina Literature Club, 2009.

"Arabic literature in Arabizers Blogs", issued by Medina Literature Club.

"Chanting’s from the Door of Peace", issued by Dar Al-Qublah in Jeddah, 2000.

"Pages from the History of Creative Literature in Medina", 2001.

"A Critical Study in Hamza Shehata Poetry", 2003.

"The Journey of Longings in the Al Anbariyah Paths", issued by Medina Literature Club, 2005.

"Completed Works", issued by Atheninyah Abdu Al-Maqsoud Khojah.

== Awards and honours ==
Ail and Uthman Hafith Prize, for Best Author in Newspaper Columns, 1996.

Honor Award by, Medina Literature Club 2000.

Honor Award by the Literary Committee hosted by Abdul Al-Maqsud Khojah, 2004.

Honor Award by the Prince of Medina (previous), the Prince Abdulaziz bin Majid Al Saud, in Al-Aqiq Cultural Conference in the 4th edition, 2010.

Honor Award by King Abdulaziz University, in Jeddah, in the opening ceremony in "literatures 3" conference, for his academic efforts, Scientifics achievements, cultural and literary initiatives.

== Death ==
The historian Asim Hamadan died in the afternoon on Saturday 16 May 2020. The Saudi "Al Medina" Newspaper attribute to him by saying:

“The author and historian Asim Hamadan has passed away at 67 of age, leaving behind him treasures of literature and history through tons of writings and collections of books, that enriched the Arabian libraries, some of his work was directly to the city’s environment “Harat Al-Aghwat” “Al Manakhah” and others, some of his works touched the history of the literary movement since the 12th century AH through his book, titled "Old and Modern Literature in Medinas Environment", and the deceased wrote over the years in “Al Zamiliah Al Madinah” and the “Arabian newspaper”, and worked as the head of editors in many other newspapers and forums, and won multiple awards from literary clubs, cultural forums and universities.”

== Bibliography ==
"Asim Hamdan: the literary human", wrote by Ahmed Mohammed Salem Al-Ahmady.
