= Assem Jaber =

Lebanese diplomat (born 1946)

Assem Jaber (Arabic: عاصم جابر; born 1946) is a Lebanese diplomat. He has served as the ambassador of Lebanon in various countries, including Russia.

== Biography ==
Jaber was born in Al Bennay, Lebanon, in 1946. He received a degree in law from Lebanese University. Following his graduation he worked as a teacher and then, joined the Ministry of Planning where he headed its legal department in 1971.

Jaber's diplomatic career began in 1972 when he was named as the consul of Lebanon in Jeddah, Saudi Arabia. Next he worked as chargé d'affaires of Lebanon in Cuba between 1977 and 1979 and in Guinea from 1981 to 1982. He was appointed ambassador of Lebanon to Ghana in 1983 which he held until 1987. Jaber was named as the ambassador of Lebanon to Canada in 1990 and served in the post until 2000. He was also former Lebanese ambassador to Russia. He presented his credentials to Russian president Vladimir Putin on 22 January 2004.
