= Aseem =

- Pronunciation: Sanskrit: [ˈasiːm] Hindi: [ˈasiːm] Punjabi: [ˈasiːm]
- Gender: Male
- Language: Sanskrit

Origin
- Meaning: "unlimited", "limitless", "infinite"

Other names
- Alternative spelling: Asim, Aasim, Aashim
- Related names: Seema or Sima (female Sanskrit name for "limit" or "boundary")

Aseem also spelled Asim, Aasim or Aashim (Sanskrit: असीम asīma) is an Indian masculine given name meaning 'unlimited/limitless/infinite'. It is not related to the often identically spelt name of Arabic origin Asim.

Notable people with the name include:

- Asim Arun, Indian politician
- Abu Asim Azmi, Indian politician
- Asim Bala, Indian politician
- Asim Basu, Indian artist
- Aseem Batra, Indian-American television director, producer and actress
- Asim Dasgupta, Indian economist and former minister of finance of West Bengal
- Asim Duttaroy, Indian-American medical scientist
- Asim Ghosh, Canadian Indian engineer
- Aseem Goel, Indian politician
- Asim Gope, Bangladeshi field hockey goalkeeper and member of Bangladesh National Team
- Aashim Gulati, Indian actor
- Aseem Malhotra, Indian politician
- Aseem Malhotra, British cardiologist
- Aseem Merchant, Indian actor
- Aseem Mishra, Indian cinematographer
- Asim Mukhopadhyay, Indian mountaineer
- Aseem Pereira, Brazilian artist
- Aseem Prakash, American Indian political scientist
- Asim Shah, Nepali politician belonging to Rastriya Swatantra Party
- Aseem Shukla, American urologist and religious advocate
- Asim Kumar Sarkar, Indian politician and folk singer
- Aseem Trivedi, Indian cartoonist

== See also ==
- Asia–Europe Meeting
