= Asim Brkan =

Bosnian singer and musician

- Also known as: Mostarac
- Born: 28 October 1954 (age 71); Mostar, SR Bosnia and Herzegovina, Yugoslavia
- Genres: Neo-folk, sevdalinka
- Occupation: singer
- Years active: 1976–1996, 2009–present
- Labels: Jugoton, PGP-RTB, PGP-RTS, In Takt Records

Asim Brkan (born 28 October 1954) is a Bosnian singer and musician. He is considered to be one of the finest and most complete folk singers of his generation.

== Biography ==
=== Early life and career beginnings ===
Brkan was born into a Bosniak family in Mostar, while Bosnia and Herzegovina was a part of Yugoslavia. His father was Ibro and his mother was Bisera. He grew up in the countryside with cousins, as his mother was working. After their financial situation improved, they moved to the center of the city and Brkan finished electrical engineering school. During his teens he sang at a folklore club in Mostar and by his late teens he had performed several times at the hotel (Rose), next to the Neretva river. He also later performed sevdalinka and old folk songs at various restaurants around the city. A few years later he was noticed and signed by the record label Jugoton. While living in Belgrade, a hairdresser offered him a job as a model, he accepted, but kept the job for only few months.

=== Career ===
At the start of his career in the 1970s, he signed a contract with the record label Jugoton, seeded in Zagreb. At his peak, he was one of the biggest stars in Yugoslavia – selling millions of copies and receiving recognition from public and critics as well. After signing a record contract with PGP-RTB, a major and high-rated music production company in Yugoslavia, Brkan moved to Belgrade and lived in a hotel for six months. In 1976, he released his first single "Tvoje oči garave" (Your Dark Eyes), composed by well respected author Mijat Božović. It was followed by the singles "Ne ruši mi sreću, nepoznata ženo!" (Do Not Crush My Love, Unknown Woman, 1978) and "Jednom sam i ja volio" (I, Too, Once Loved, July 1979), both composed by Aca Stepić.

In the 1980s, he partnered with a different composer, Ljubo Kešelj and released a hit album "Najljepšu haljinu večeras obuci" (Wear the Most Beautiful Dress Tonight, 1982.) Throughout the 80s, he performed at various festivals and held concerts all over Yugoslavia.

At the early stage of the Yugoslav Wars he left Belgrade and went with his family to the Netherlands, and later Germany. As a result of the Yugoslav wars, the state collapsed and a new music genre, called "Turbo-folk" started gaining popularity in social and cultural life. Based on personal beliefs, Brkan could not accept "life in a jungle" and low-profile music. Although the war had not yet finished, because of his patriotism, he returned to Bosnia in 1994. After few efforts to come back, he eventually retired from his professional career in 1996, at the age of 42.

Beside songs composed for his studio albums, he will also be remembered as outstanding performer of Bosnian traditional song - Sevdalinka. Some of his interpretations are inducted in National Music Register. He recorded songs for Bosnian and Serbian radio and TV archive, written and composed by Sevdah legends. Brkan has also performed at many prominent music festivals (in Sarajevo, Belgrade, Novi Sad, Skopje), traditionally receiving awards for interpretation.

In 2009, three decades after his first and biggest hit song "Jednom sam i ja volio", Brkan made a comeback. His original record label, PGP-RTS (previously known as PGP-RTB), published a CD with his songs from 1976 to 1990. In the same year, he recorded series of sevdalinka songs for MP BHRT (Bosnian radio and television music production.) His version of "Mujo kuje konja pod mjesecu" (Mujo Shoes the Horse Below the Moonlight) was inducted into the National Music Register just five days after recording. A few weeks after the CD was published, in a television show, Brkan made his first live performance after a more than decade-long hiatus.

=== Personal life ===
After marrying a woman from Tuzla named Azra, the newlyweds moved into a new apartment in Belgrade and later had a son together. When the wars in Yugoslavia broke out in the early 1990s, he moved his family from Belgrade to a friends home in the Netherlands. During this time, he did not sing until his friend Halid Muslimović invited him to Germany. Brkan returned to his war-torn home-country of Bosnia in 1994, where he stayed for the remainder of the war and currently still lives there. He has two sons Omar (born 1989) and Emel (born 1996)

== Discography ==
=== Singles ===
- Tvoje oči garave (1976)
- Ne ruši mi sreću, nepoznata ženo! / Željela si dva prstena (1978)
- Jednom sam i ja volio / Dvije mladosti za ljubav smo dali (1979)
- Da si sretna pisala mi ne bi / Ljubavi vladaju svijetom (1980)

=== Studio albums ===
- Voli me, grli me (1981)
- Najljepšu haljinu večeras obuci (1982)
- Majko, prijatelju moj (1984)
- Ema (1985)
- Još me ima! (1989)
- I tako idu dani (1990)
- Zlata (1996)

=== Compilation albums ===
- Best of (2009)

=== Sevdalinka ===
- Sjetuje me majka
- Iz kamena voda tekla
- Evo ovu rumen ružu
- Čudna jada od Mostara grada
- Mujo kuje
- Jednog divnog dana u Mostaru gradu
- Puknute strune
- Za tebe sam vezan grade
- Basča od jasmina
- Jahao sam konje
