= Asim Bradić =

Personal information
- Born: May 14, 1975 (age 51) Sarajevo, SR Bosnia and Herzegovina, SFR Yugoslavia
- Coaching career: 1999–present

Career history

Coaching
- 1999–2000: KK Bosna
- Bosnia and Herzegovina (conditioning coach)

Asim Bradić (born 14 May 1975 in Sarajevo) is a Bosnian-born Croatian sports scientist, strength and conditioning coach, and former basketball coach. He is an associate professor at the University of Zagreb's Faculty of Kinesiology.

== Early life and playing career ==
Bradić grew up in Sarajevo and came through the youth ranks of KK Bosna as a player. He graduated from the Faculty of Sport and Physical Education in Sarajevo in 1999, later earning a doctorate there in 2007, and began his academic career as an assistant to Izet Rađo.

== Coaching career ==
In 1999 and 2000, Bradić served as a coach of KK Bosna, a position he has said he owed to club legend Mirza Delibašić. He later worked as a conditioning coach for the Bosnia and Herzegovina men's national basketball team.

Bradić moved into academia and sports science, working as a strength and conditioning coach and consultant across multiple sports, including basketball, football, martial arts and tennis, from 1999 onward. He obtained Croatian citizenship in the late 2000s and joined the Faculty of Kinesiology in Zagreb, where he has taught courses including "Functional Training with Load" and "Methodology of Athletes' Conditioning Preparation."

== Personal Health Model controversy ==
In September 2019, an investigation by the Croatian news outlet Index.hr reported that Bradić had marketed expensive fitness and conditioning certification courses under the name Personal Health Model (PHM), while falsely claiming the endorsement of major American strength-and-conditioning organisations, including the National Strength and Conditioning Association and Perform Better, and using their logos on course certificates without authorisation. Perform Better Europe subsequently issued a statement denying any association with Bradić or PHM.

According to Index.hr, Bradić subsequently apologised to some course participants and refunded their payments, and removed references to the American organisations from his promotional materials. Bradić declined to comment in detail at the time, stating that the matter was being handled by his lawyers.
