= Ashim, Azerbaijan =

Ashim
- Location within Azerbaijan
- Coordinates: 39°23′N 48°35′E
- Country: Azerbaijan
- Rayon: Bilasuvar
- Time zone: UTC+4 (AZT)

Ashim is a village in the Bilasuvar Rayon of Azerbaijan.
