= Asım Güzelbey =

Turkish politician and former mayor

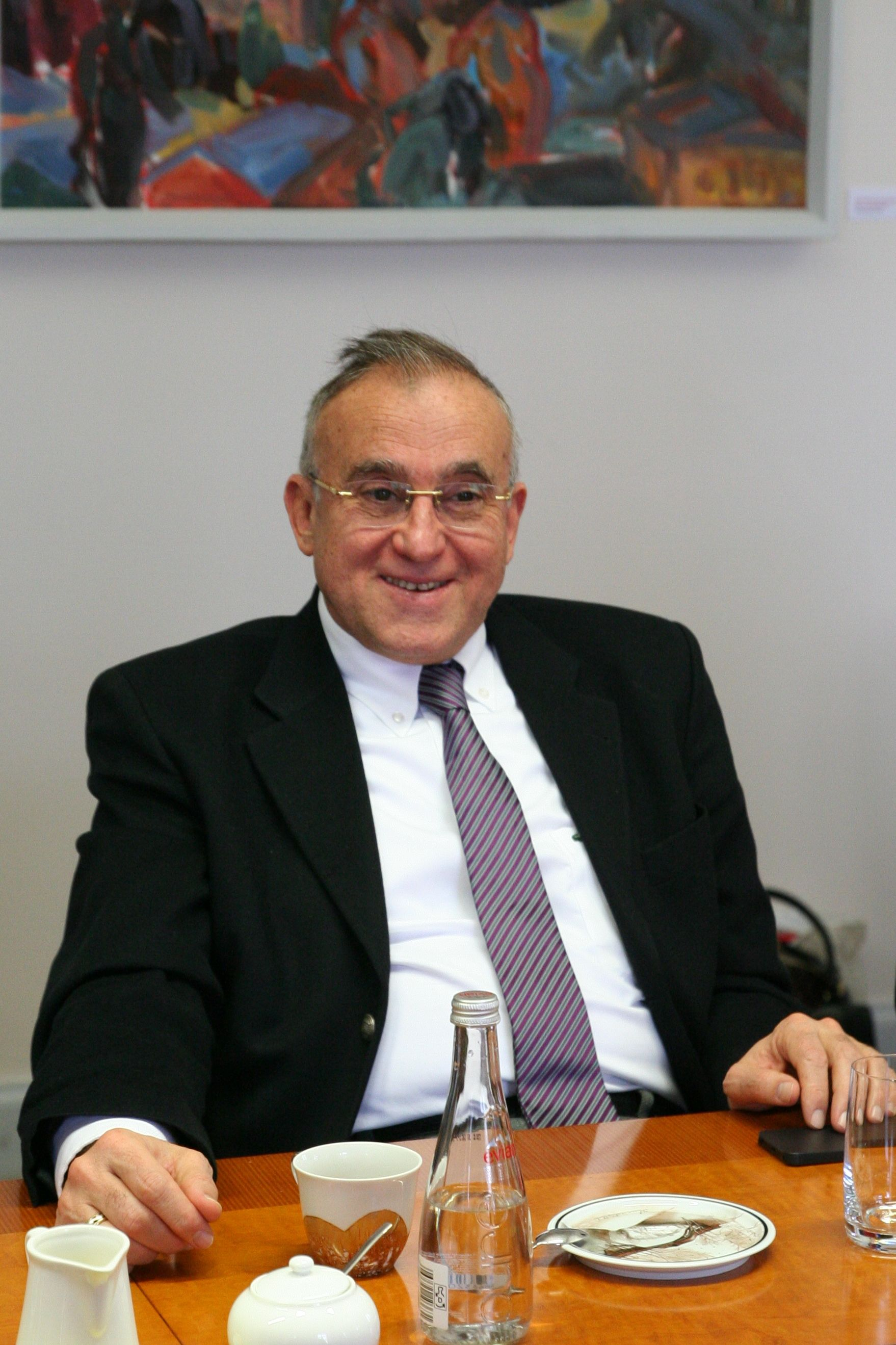

Asım Güzelbey (born 1951, Gaziantep, Turkey) is a Turkish politician of the Justice and Development Party (AK Party) and a former mayor of Gaziantep (2004-2014).

Asım Güzelbey is a surgeon by profession. He graduated in medicine. From 1974-1978, having specialized in knee surgery in Sweden, he studied at the Karolinska Institute. In 1981, he began working as an orthopedic specialist at the Social Security Hospital in Gaziantep. He worked as a volunteer doctor in Azerbaijan after the 1992 conflict. From 1998-2003 he worked in the Konukoğlu hospital.

In the 2004 local government elections he scored 57.3% of the vote and was elected mayor of Gaziantep. He stood for a second term in the 29 March 2009 election and won 54.3% of the vote.

He is married with two children.
