= Askim (disambiguation) =

Askim may refer to:

- Askim, a municipality in Østfold, Norway
- Askim, Sweden, a borough in Gothenburg, Sweden
- Askim Hundred, a geographic division in Västergötland, Sweden

== See also ==
- "Askim" - a song by jazz saxophonist Kamasi Washington on the album The Epic.
