= Asim Waqif =

Indian artist

- Born: 1978 (age 47–48); Hyderabad, India
- Education: School of Planning and Architecture, New Delhi
- Known for: Sculpture, Site-specific art, Interactive installation, Upcycling
- Website: asimwaqif.com

Asim Waqif is an Indian artist based in New Delhi, whose work is influenced by interdisciplinary fields of art, architecture, ecology and design. He makes site-specific or interactive installations and sculptures, which are often made out of discarded or reclaimed waste materials, like bamboo, rope, tar or trashed metal.

In Waqif's 2012 The New York Times profile, he was quoted as saying: "Contemporary Indian art is so disjointed from the public. It’s elitist. I want to connect with the average person in India." In March 2020, he was named one of the 10 Indian artists shaping contemporary art by the online art platform Artsy.

== Biography ==
Waqif was born in Hyderabad, India, and trained as an architect at the School of Planning and Architecture, New Delhi. After graduating, he worked as an art director for TV shows and then moved into producing documentaries and independent films, before ultimately dedicating himself fully to his art practice.

== Career ==
Waqif's debut solo show in Europe was held at Palais de Tokyo in December 2012, titled Bordel Monstre or "Monstrous Mess". He used detritus from previous exhibitions and repurposed it to create an immersive installation. In a review of the installation, American artist Robert Barry wrote in the frieze magazine: "Bordel Monstre is a fascinating exercise in making use of things otherwise neglected: constructed in a corner of the Palais de Tokyo which hasn’t previously been used, made out of materials discarded at the end of the previous exhibition. And if its exterior form resembles the damage wrought by a force of nature, its construction was as spontaneous and unplanned as the weather.".

In 2017, Waqif's large-scale site-specific immersive installation, Salvage, was mounted in downtown Vancouver, in association with the Vancouver Art Gallery, Canada. Architectural in nature, it was assembled using doors, windows, roofs, tiles and wall sections, which were either sourced from demolition sites or discarded materials from local buildings.

== Solo exhibitions ==
- 2012 - Punha, site-specific installation at Bhau Daji Lad Museum, Mumbai
- 2012 - Bordel Monstre at Palais de Tokyo, Paris
- 2013 - Khalal at Gallery Nature Morte, New Delhi
- 2013 - Epreuves at Galerie Daniel Templon, Paris
- 2017 - Salvage at Vancouver Art Gallery, Canada
- 2018 - Residual Fear at Gallery Nature Morte, New Delhi
