= Assem Dessouki =

Assem El Dessouky
- Born: Assem Ahmed El-Sayed El-Dessouky; August 31, 1939 (age 87); El Mahalla El Kubra, Gharbia Governorate, Egypt
- Known for: Research on modern Egyptian social and political history
- Awards: State Appreciation Award (2012)

Academic background
- Education: Ain Shams University (BA, PhD)
- Thesis: Egypt's Major Landowners and Their Role in Egyptian Society (1914–1952) (1973)

Academic work
- Discipline: History
- Institutions: Helwan University; Ain Shams University
- Main interests: Modern Egyptian history; Social history; Political history

Notes
- Member of the Egyptian Historical Society.

Assem El Dessouky (Arabic: عاصم الدسوقي; born August 31, 1939) is an Egyptian university professor and historian.

== Life ==
Assem Ahmed El Sayed El Dessouky was born on August 31, 1939, in the city of El Mahalla El Kubra in the Gharbia Governorate. His father, whose family origins trace back to the Levant, worked as an engineer at the Misr Spinning and Weaving Company, a subsidiary of Banque Misr. His father later moved to the city of Tura in Cairo to teach industrial drawing at the University School of Industries. The family then relocated to the Shubra district, which marked the true beginning of Assem's upbringing.

He studied at the Mohammed Ali Preparatory School (currently the Mohammed Farid School), then transferred to the Khedive Ismail Secondary School for his high school education.

He graduated from the Department of History at the Faculty of Arts, Ain Shams University, in 1961. He earned his PhD from the same faculty in 1973 with a dissertation titled "Egypt's Major Landowners and Their Role in Egyptian Society (1914–1952)".

== Career ==
El Dessouky began his professional career in May 1962, when he was appointed to a government position under a decree from the Ministry of Manpower at the time, which mandated the employment of university graduates. He later transitioned into academia, serving as a Professor of Modern and Contemporary History at the Faculty of Arts, Helwan University.

Currently, El-Dessouky is a professor emeritus of Modern and Contemporary History at the Faculty of Arts, Ain Shams University, where he continues his academic contributions by supervising theses. He is also a member of the Egyptian Historical Society.

As a historian, his career is noted for spanning numerous pivotal eras in modern Egyptian history, from the reign of King Farouk to the presidency of Abdel Fattah el-Sisi.

== Works ==
El Dessouky's contributions include both original books and translations. Among his most notable works are:

=== As author ===
- The 1919 Revolution in the Provinces (Arabic: ثورة 1919 في الأقاليم)
- Unpublished Ideas (1982–1996): The Circumstances and Context (Arabic: أفكار لم تُنشر (1982–1996): الظروف والملابَسات)
- Zionism and the Palestine Question in the U.S. Congress (1943–1945) (Arabic: الصهيونية والقضية الفلسطينية في الكونجرس الأمريكي (1943–1945))

=== As translator ===
- Ottoman Europe (1354–1804): On the Origins of the Ethnic Conflict in Bosnia and Herzegovina (Arabic: أوروبا العثمانية (1354–1804): في أصول الصراع العِرقي في البوسنة والهرسك)

== Awards ==
In 2012, he received the State Appreciation Award for his research in the social sciences.
