= FIBA EuroBasket 1997 qualification =

Qualification for the 1997 FIBA European Championship, commonly called FIBA EuroBasket 1997 took place between 24 May 1995 and 26 February 1997. A total of fourteen teams qualified for the tournament, joining hosts Spain and European Champions Yugoslavia.

== Format ==
A total of 43 teams participated. Competition consisted of two stages:

- A qualifying round that consisted of nineteen teams divided in three round-robin tournament that took place in Birmingham-England, Kavadarci-Republic of Macedonia and Lugano Switzerland between 22 May and 28 May 1995.
- A Semi-Final round where the first and second teams from each of the three groups from the qualifying round joined another twenty-four teams. All thirty teams where then divided in five round-robin groups of six teams each. This stage took place between 8 October 1995 and 26 February 1997 and competition consisted of home and away legs, taking place in each of the participating countries. The top two teams from each group plus the best four third-placed teams qualified for EuroBasket 1997.

== Qualifying round ==
Qualified for the semi-final round

=== Group A (Birmingham, England) ===
Team	Pld	W	L	PF	PA	PD	Pts
Poland	5	5	0	487	351	+136	10
England	5	4	1	441	361	+80	9
Georgia	5	3	2	421	398	+23	8
Denmark	5	2	3	421	392	+29	7
Luxembourg	5	1	4	363	473	−110	6
Wales	5	0	5	331	489	−158	5

24 May 1995
16:00

Boxscore

Denmark	95–75	Luxembourg
Scoring by half: 46–34, 49–41
Pts: Hjorth 15; Rebs: Danielsen, Hauge, Bjerregaard 5 Asts: Edelman 4		Pts: Feyder 21; Rebs: Wolter 7 Asts: Adam 5

NEC Arena – Birmingham, England
Referees: Juan Carlos Mitjana (ESP), Richard Stokes (ENG)

24 May 1995
18:00

Boxscore

Georgia	68–91	Poland
Scoring by half: 27–46, 41–45
Pts: Natsvlishvili 21; Rebs: Stepania 9 Asts: Guraspauli 2		Pts: Wójcik 19; Rebs: Tomczyk, Wójcik 7 Asts: Kościuk 5

NEC Arena – Birmingham, England

24 May 1995
20:15

Boxscore

England	96–57	Wales
Scoring by half: 58–26, 38–31
Pts: Scantlebury 22; Rebs: Austin 8 Asts: Baker 5		Pts: Horrocks 17; Rebs: Lewis 7 Asts: Horrocks, Porter 2

NEC Arena – Birmingham, England

25 May 1995
16:00

Boxscore

Georgia	97–86	Denmark
Scoring by half: 41–32, 56–54
Pts: Sanadze, Derjugin 20; Rebs: Vashakidze 7 Asts: Derjugin 5		Pts: Danielsen 22; Rebs: Danielsen, Bjerregaard 8 Asts: Hansen, Hjorth 3

NEC Arena – Birmingham, England
Referees: Gérard Gretsch (LUX), Richard Stokes (ENG)

25 May 1995
18:00

Boxscore

Wales	71–111	Poland
Scoring by half: 31–53, 40–58
Pts: Lewis 21; Rebs: Thomas, Weedall 6 Asts: Horrocks, Porter 2		Pts: Tomczyk, Bacik 16; Rebs: Parzeński 8 Asts: Wójcik 4

NEC Arena – Birmingham, England

25 May 1995
20:00

Boxscore

England	102–72	Luxembourg
Scoring by half: 58–35, 44–37
Pts: Dunkley 23; Rebs: Austin, Gordon 10; Asts: Bucknall 7		Pts: M. Schiltz 19; Rebs: Gruskovnjak 5 Asts: Adam 2

NEC Arena – Birmingham, England

26 May 1995
14:00

Boxscore

Denmark	65–75	Poland
Scoring by half: 36–43, 29–32
Pts: Jerichow 17; Rebs: Bjerregaard 8 Asts: Larsen 4		Pts: Wójcik 25; Rebs: Wójcik 9 Asts: Kościuk, Kabala 3

NEC Arena – Birmingham, England
Referees: William Jones (WAL), Richard Stokes (ENG)

26 May 1995
18:00

Boxscore

Wales	73–76	Luxembourg
Scoring by half: 31–51, 42–25
Pts: Horrocks 29; Rebs: Thomas 7 Asts: Horrocks 2		Pts: Feyder 30; Rebs: Wohl 7 Asts: Adam 4

NEC Arena – Birmingham, England

26 May 1995
20:00

Boxscore

England	84–74	Georgia
Scoring by half: 48–37, 36–37
Pts: Bucknall 21; Rebs: Dunkley 7 Asts: Samuels, Bucknall 2		Pts: Stepania 19; Rebs: Derjugin 5 Asts: Natsvlishvili 3

NEC Arena – Birmingham, England

27 May 1995
16:00

Boxscore

Poland	122–76	Luxembourg
Scoring by half: 63–35, 59–41
Pts: Wójcik 26; Rebs: Bacik 13; Asts: Gołąb 5		Pts: Feyder 17; Rebs: Adam 5 Asts: M. Schiltz, Maas, Feyder, P. Schiltz 2

NEC Arena – Birmingham, England

27 May 1995
18:00

Boxscore

Georgia	101–73	Wales
Scoring by half: 49–33, 52–40
Pts: Natsvlishvili 15; Rebs: Natsvlishvili 10; Asts: Vashakidze, Guraspauli, Sanadze 2		Pts: Horrocks 19; Rebs: Seeley, Longman 5 Asts: Horrocks 3

NEC Arena – Birmingham, England

27 May 1995
20:00

Boxscore

England	88–70	Denmark
Scoring by half: 36–42, 52–28
Pts: Bucknall 20; Rebs: Austin 10; Asts: Baker 4		Pts: Larsen 21; Rebs: Danielsen 9 Asts: Larsen 1

NEC Arena – Birmingham, England

28 May 1995
12:00

Boxscore

Georgia	81–64	Luxembourg
Scoring by half: 37–35, 44–29
Pts: Derjugin 18; Rebs: Derjugin, Stepania 8 Asts: Guraspauli 3		Pts: Feyder 21; Rebs: M. Schiltz 5 Asts: M. Schiltz 3

NEC Arena – Birmingham, England
Referees: Bruno Gasperin (FRA), Richard Stokes (ENG)

28 May 1995
14:00

Boxscore

Denmark	105–57	Wales
Scoring by half: 60–33, 45–24
Pts: Danielsen 26; Rebs: Larsen 8 Asts: Edelman 4		Pts: Lewis 17; Rebs: Lewis 10; Asts: Porter 2

NEC Arena – Birmingham, England

28 May 1995
18:00

Boxscore

England	71–88	Poland
Scoring by half: 33–51, 38–37
Pts: Samuels, Bucknall 16; Rebs: Huggins, Gordon 4 Asts: Baker, Dunkley 2		Pts: Wójcik 23; Rebs: Jankowski 14; Asts: Kościuk 4

NEC Arena – Birmingham, England

=== Group B (Kavadarci, Republic of Macedonia) ===
Team	Pld	W	L	PF	PA	PD	Pts	Tie
Belarus	5	4	1	505	371	+134	9	1–1, +21
Netherlands	5	4	1	431	351	+80	9	1–1, -2
Macedonia	5	4	1	472	409	+63	9	1–1, -19
Ireland	5	2	3	366	421	−55	7	
Albania	5	1	4	375	474	−99	6	
Norway	5	0	5	336	459	−123	5	

Rules=1) Points; 2) Head-to-head results; 3) Points difference; 4) Points scored.

24 May 1995
16:00

Boxscore

Albania	74–100	Macedonia
Scoring by half: 33–52, 41–48
Pts: Kurtoğlu 23; Rebs: Mema 6 Asts: Gjeçaj 2		Pts: Naumoski 33; Rebs: Bocevski 5 Asts: Naumoski 5

Jasmin Sports Hall – Kavadarci, Republic of Macedonia
Referees: Aliaksandr Yarotski (BLR), Alojz Ceizel (SVK)

24 May 1995
18:00

Boxscore

Ireland	62–108	Belarus
Scoring by half: 25–53, 37–55
Pts: Powell 16; Rebs: Tomidy 4 Asts: Powell 2		Pts: Baidakou 20; Rebs: Svetnik, Pyntsikau 3 Asts: Pyntsikau, Krivonos, Griszczuk 1

Arena Jasmin – Kavadarci, Republic of Macedonia
Referees: Stein Moe (NOR), Dashamir Bardhi (ALB)

24 May 1995
20:00

Boxscore

Netherlands	93–47	Norway
Scoring by half: 44–23, 49–24
Pts: Huijbens 17; Rebs: Huijbens 8 Asts: Franke, te Velde 2		Pts: Bryn 19; Rebs: Dyrkolbotn 12; Asts: Bryn, Dyrkolbotn 2

Arena Jasmin – Kavadarci, Republic of Macedonia
Referees: Jugoslav Dikovski (MKD), David Dagan (ISR)

25 May 1995
16:00

Boxscore

Macedonia	110–74	Ireland
Scoring by half: 56–30, 54–44
Pts: Naumoski 37; Rebs: Bocevski 13; Asts: Vojnovik 3		Pts: Tomidy 20; Rebs: O'Connell, Powell 8 Asts: O'Connell 5

Arena Jasmin – Kavadarci, Republic of Macedonia
Referees: Jan Herweijer (NED), Stein Moe (NOR)

25 May 1997
18:00

Boxscore

Norway	77–81	Albania
Scoring by half: 46–52, 31–29
Pts: Dyrkolbotn 27; Rebs: Dyrkolbotn 14; Asts: Larsen 2		Pts: Kurtoğlu 27; Rebs: Çapaliku 9 Asts: Selmani 3

Arena Jasmin – Kavadarci, Republic of Macedonia
Referees: Jugoslav Dikovski (MKD), Tony Colgan (IRL)

25 May 1997
20:00

Boxscore

Belarus	87–88	Netherlands
Scoring by half: 41–45, 46–43
Pts: Griszczuk 21; Rebs: Dayneko 6 Asts: Krivonos 4		Pts: te Velde 24; Rebs: Lieverst 11; Asts: Franke 4

Arena Jasmin – Kavadarci, Republic of Macedonia
Referees: David Dagan (ISR), Alojz Ceizel (SVK)

26 May 1995
16:00

Boxscore

Norway	79–99	Macedonia
Scoring by half: 36–56, 43–43
Pts: Bryn 26; Rebs: Dyrkolbotn 8 Asts: Heggen, Sjøtun 3		Pts: Davitkov 25; Rebs: Bocevski 10; Asts: Naumoski 6

Arena Jasmin – Kavadarci, Republic of Macedonia
Referees: Dashamir Bardhi (ALB), Alojz Ceizel (SVK)

26 May 1995
18:00

Boxscore

Netherlands	68–57	Ireland
Scoring by half: 36–26, 32–31
Pts: Huijbens, van Poelgeest 13; Rebs: Lieverst 8 Asts: Franke 6		Pts: Tomidy 20; Rebs: Burke 9 Asts: Tomidy 3

Arena Jasmin – Kavadarci, Republic of Macedonia
Referees: Aliaksandr Yarotski (BLR), Jugoslav Dikovski (MKD)

26 May 1995
20:00

Boxscore

Albania	73–108	Belarus
Scoring by half: 43–42, 30–66
Pts: Kurtoğlu 18; Rebs: Çapaliku 8 Asts: Mema 2		Pts: Griszczuk 21; Rebs: Koul 12; Asts: Koul 3

Arena Jasmin – Kavadarci, Republic of Macedonia
Referees: Stein Moe (NOR), Tony Colgan (IRL)

27 May 1995
16:00

Boxscore

Macedonia	83–80	Netherlands
Scoring by half: 41–41, 42–39
Pts: Naumoski 35; Rebs: Bocevski 18; Asts: Davitkov 8		Pts: Huijbens 20; Rebs: Huijbens 11; Asts: Krieger, Van Rootselaar, Melis 2

Arena Jasmin – Kavadarci, Republic of Macedonia
Referees: David Dagan (ISR), Tony Colgan (IRL)

27 May 1995
18:00

Boxscore

Belarus	100–68	Norway
Scoring by half: 42–34, 58–34
Pts: Griszczuk 24; Rebs: Dayneko 12; Asts: Baidakou 5		Pts: Bryn 26; Rebs: Bryn, Dyrkolbotn 9 Asts: Sjøtun, Dyrkolbotn 2

Arena Jasmin – Kavadarci, Republic of Macedonia
Referees: Jan Herweijer (NED), Dashamir Bardhi (ALB)

27 May 1995
20:00

Boxscore

Ireland	87–70	Albania
Scoring by half: 37–35, 50–35
Pts: O'Connell 22; Rebs: O'Connell 13; Asts: Tomidy, Donnelly, O'Connell 2		Pts: Kurtoglu 19; Rebs: Mema, Kurtoğlu, Gjeçaj 5 Asts: Palko 3

Arena Jasmin – Kavadarci, Republic of Macedonia
Referees: Stein Moe (NOR), Aliaksandr Yarotski (BLR)

28 May 1995
16:00

Boxscore

Belarus	102–80	Macedonia
Scoring by half: 49–35, 53–45
Pts: Griszczuk 34; Rebs: Koul 12; Asts: Pyntsikau, Koul, Griszczuk 1		Pts: Davitkov 20; Rebs: Bocevski 11; Asts: Jovanovski 5

Arena Jasmin – Kavadarci, Republic of Macedonia
Referees: David Dagan (ISR), Alojz Ceizel (SVK)

28 May 1995
18:00

Boxscore

Albania	77–102	Netherlands
Scoring by half: 38–54, 39–48
Pts: Kurtoğlu 20; Rebs: Çapaliku 7 Asts: Selmani 3		Pts: Huijbens 21; Rebs: Huijbens 9 Asts: Van Rootselaar 7

Arena Jasmin – Kavadarci, Republic of Macedonia
Referees: Stein Moe (NOR), Aliaksandr Yarotski (BLR)

28 May 1995
20:00

Boxscore

Norway	65–86	Ireland
Scoring by half: 37–43, 28–43
Pts: Sjøtun, Bryn 17; Rebs: Bryn 10; Asts: Sjøtun, Ulfsnes, Sjolund, Bryn, Dyrkolbotn 1		Pts: Powell 23; Rebs: O'Connell, Powell 6 Asts: Tomidy 2

Arena Jasmin – Kavadarci, Republic of Macedonia
Referees: Jan Herweijer (NED), Jugoslav Dikovski (MKD)

=== Group C (Lugano, Switzerland) ===
Team	Pld	W	L	PF	PA	PD	Pts
Portugal	6	6	0	473	378	+95	12
Switzerland	6	5	1	418	351	+67	11
Romania	6	4	2	438	396	+42	10
Iceland	6	3	3	495	466	+29	9
Cyprus	6	2	4	367	404	−37	8
Austria	6	1	5	365	420	−55	7
Scotland	6	0	6	387	528	−141	6

22 May 1995
16:00

Boxscore

Romania	61–74	Portugal
Scoring by half: 32–42, 29–32
Pts: Alexe 16; Rebs: Ştefan 7 Asts: Țenter, Palii 1		Pts: A. Selores Ramos 19; Rebs: Wayne Rocha 8 Asts: Das Neves Alves 3

Istituto Elvetico – Lugano, Switzerland

22 May 1995
18:15

Boxscore

Austria	58–74	Iceland
Scoring by half: 27–30, 31–44
Pts: Hajda 19; Rebs: Volcic 9 Asts: Hajda, Popp, Wöber, Bauer 1		Pts: Arnarson 16; Rebs: Arnarson, Ingimundarson 5 Asts: Örlygsson 3

Istituto Elvetico – Lugano, Switzerland

22 May 1995
20:30

Boxscore

Switzerland	66–58	Cyprus
Scoring by half: 35–30, 31–28
Pts: Déforel 13; Rebs: Valis 10; Asts: Gojanovic 2		Pts: Stylianides 20; Rebs: Soleas 7 Asts: Stylianides 7

Istituto Elvetico – Lugano, Switzerland

23 May 1995
16:00

Boxscore

Scotland	64–79	Austria
Scoring by half: 34–47, 30–32
Pts: Tait 18; Rebs: Mitchell 6 Asts: Mcdaid, MacLean 1		Pts: Hajda 29; Rebs: Volcic 10; Asts: Volcic 4

Istituto Elvetico – Lugano, Switzerland

23 May 1995
18:15

Boxscore

Cyprus	41–62	Romania
Scoring by half: 16–33, 25–29
Pts: Konstantinou 8 Rebs: Soleas 6 Asts: S. Kyriakou, Michail 1		Pts: Ştefan 16; Rebs: Alecu 6 Asts: Alexe, Sinevici, Alecu, Ardelean, Palii 1

Istituto Elvetico – Lugano, Switzerland

23 May 1995
20:30

Boxscore

Iceland	78–87	Switzerland
Scoring by half: 40–42, 38–45
Pts: Bragason 16; Rebs: Bragason 4 Asts: Arnarson 1		Pts: Margot 24; Rebs: Valis 5 Asts: Mrazek 3

Istituto Elvetico – Lugano, Switzerland
Attendance: 1,000

24 May 1995
16:00

Boxscore

Portugal	81–60	Cyprus
Scoring by half: 37–31, 44–29
Pts: Dias da Silva 21; Rebs: Dias da Silva 9 Asts: Das Neves Alves 3		Pts: Karayiannis 21; Rebs: Stylianides 7 Asts: S. Kyriakou 2

Istituto Elvetico – Lugano, Switzerland

24 May 1995
18:15

Boxscore

Switzerland	85–52	Scotland
Scoring by half: 37–17, 48–35
Pts: Gojanovic 20; Rebs: Valis 7 Asts: Koller, Gojanovic, Margot 2		Pts: MacLean 26; Rebs: Birch, Tait 4 Asts: Mcdaid, Tait 1

Istituto Elvetico – Lugano, Switzerland

24 May 1995
20:30

Boxscore

Romania	102–85	Iceland
Scoring by half: 59–38, 43–47
Pts: Ardelean 25; Rebs: Ardelean 5 Asts: Țenter, Păun, Palii 1		Pts: Hauksson 19; Rebs: Gíslason 3 Asts: Bragason, Skúlason 1

Istituto Elvetico – Lugano, Switzerland

25 May 1995
16:00

Boxscore

Austria	51–58	Switzerland
Scoring by half: 24–28, 27–30
Pts: Hajda 11; Rebs: Volcic 10; Asts: Hajda 2		Pts: Gojanovic 16; Rebs: Valis 6 Asts: Déforel 4

Istituto Elvetico – Lugano, Switzerland

25 May 1995
18:15

Boxscore

Iceland	70–88	Portugal
Scoring by half: 37–29, 33–59
Pts: Skúlason 23; Rebs: Bragason 6 Asts: Hardarson, Örlygsson, Gíslason 1		Pts: Dos Santos Monteiro 27; Rebs: Dias da Silva, Plowden, Wayne Rocha 6 Asts: Dos Santos Monteiro 2

Istituto Elvetico – Lugano, Switzerland

25 May 1995
20:30

Boxscore

Scotland	70–97	Romania
Scoring by half: 45–43, 25–54
Pts: MacLean 25; Rebs: Brownlie 5 Asts: Forrest, Birch, Norval 1		Pts: Alexe 24; Rebs: Alexe, Ştefan 6 Asts: Țenter 5

Istituto Elvetico – Lugano, Switzerland
Attendance: 1,000

26 May 1995
16:00

Boxscore

Cyprus	62–77	Iceland
Scoring by half: 33–36, 29–41
Pts: Antoniou 23; Rebs: Antoniou 6 Asts: Kyriacou 1		Pts: Örlygsson 19; Rebs: Bragason 14; Asts: Gíslason 2

Istituto Elvetico – Lugano, Switzerland

26 May 1995
18:15

Boxscore

Romania	69–63	Austria
Scoring by half: 34–31, 35–32
Pts: Alexe 15; Rebs: Alecu 4 Asts: Țenter, Alexe, Tordai 1		Pts: Hajda 14; Rebs: Volcic 10; Asts: Volcic 1

Istituto Elvetico – Lugano, Switzerland

26 May 1995
20:30

Boxscore

Portugal	86–71	Scotland
Scoring by half: 48–33, 38–38
Pts: Dias da Silva 19; Rebs: Wayne Rocha 6 Asts: Das Neves Alves 6		Pts: MacLean 19; Rebs: MacLean, Brownlie 3 Asts: Forrest 2

Istituto Elvetico – Lugano, Switzerland

27 May 1995
16:00

Boxscore

Switzerland	63–47	Romania
Scoring by half: 36–25, 27–22
Pts: Maggi 26; Rebs: Valis 8 Asts: Gojanovic, Valis, Maggi 1		Pts: Ştefan 12; Rebs: Alecu, Ardelean 3 Asts: Alexe, Alecu, Cărutasu 1

Istituto Elvetico – Lugano, Switzerland

27 May 1995
18:15

Boxscore

Scotland	61–70	Cyprus
Scoring by half: 31–32, 30–38
Pts: Tait 15; Rebs: MacLean, Brownlie 8 Asts: Smith, MacLean 1		Pts: Karayiannis 24; Rebs: Antoniou 8 Asts: Stylianides, Karayiannis 1

Istituto Elvetico – Lugano, Switzerland

27 May 1995
20:30

Boxscore

Austria	57–79	Portugal
Scoring by half: 28–39, 29–40
Pts: Weissenböck 14; Rebs: Moschik 6		Pts: A. Selores Ramos 20; Rebs: Dias da Silva, Plowden 7 Asts: Azevedo de Seixas, Das Neves Alves 2

Istituto Elvetico – Lugano, Switzerland

28 May 1995
16:00

Boxscore

Iceland	111–69	Scotland
Scoring by half: 42–33, 69–36
Pts: Bragason 21; Rebs: Bragason 8 Asts: Gíslason 4		Pts: MacLean 21; Rebs: MacLean 9 Asts: Mcdaid, Birch, Smith, Mitchell 1

Istituto Elvetico – Lugano, Switzerland

28 May 1995
18:15

Boxscore

Portugal	65–59	Switzerland
Scoring by half: 39–30, 26–29
Pts: Dias da Silva 19; Rebs: Dias da Silva 5 Asts: Das Neves Alves 1		Pts: Maggi 22; Rebs: Valis 10; Asts: Extermann 1

Istituto Elvetico – Lugano, Switzerland

28 May 1995
20:30

Boxscore

Cyprus	76–57	Austria
Scoring by half: 36–27, 40–30
Pts: Antoniou 18; Rebs: Antoniou 9 Asts: Karayiannis 2		Pts: Hajda 16; Rebs: Volcic 9 Asts: Hajda, Popp 2

Istituto Elvetico – Lugano, Switzerland

== Semi-final round ==
Qualified for EuroBasket 1997

=== Group A ===
Team	Pld	W	L	PF	PA	PD	Pts
Greece	10	9	1	791	665	+126	19
Bosnia and Herzegovina	10	7	3	760	712	+48	17
Israel	10	6	4	811	734	+77	16
Belarus	10	4	6	747	791	−44	14
Georgia	10	3	7	753	819	−66	13
Slovakia	10	1	9	740	881	−141	11

8 October 1995
17:00

Boxscore

Slovakia	82–73	Georgia
Scoring by half: 41–29, 41–44
Pts: Uhnák 26; Rebs: Michalík 10; Asts: Mičuda 3		Pts: Stepania 29; Rebs: Stepania 15; Asts: Derjugin, Stepania 3

Myjava
Referees: Dubravko Muhvić (CRO), Wiesław Zych (POL)

8 October 1995
19:30

Boxscore

Bosnia and Herzegovina	80–59	Belarus
Scoring by half: 44–45, 36–14
Pts: Bukva 27; Rebs: Bukva 13; Asts: Marković Zorić 4		Pts: Klemez 21; Rebs: Olszewski 6 Asts: Baidakou, Klemez 4

Berlin
Attendance: 2,126
Referees: Ivan Zachara (CZE), Krzysztof Koralewski (POL)

8 October 1995
21:00

Boxscore

Greece	75–73	Israel
Scoring by half: 28–35, 47–38
Pts: Angelidis 16; Rebs: Fasoulas 11; Asts: Giannakis 5		Pts: Jamchi 22; Rebs: Fleisher 9 Asts: Henefeld 7

Athens
Attendance: 6,000
Referees: Zoran Dimitrijević (SRB), Gennaro Colucci (ITA)

11 October 1995
15:00

Boxscore

Georgia	77–66	Bosnia and Herzegovina
Scoring by half: 30–28, 47–38
Pts: Sanadze 24; Rebs: Stepania 13; Asts: Stepania, Chkheidze 2		Pts: Bukva 25; Rebs: Bukva 11; Asts: Bećiragić 2

Tbilisi Sports Palace, Tbilisi
Attendance: 5,200
Referees: Kamen Toshev (BUL), Ivo Dolinek (CZE)

11 October 1995
20:30

Boxscore

Israel	86–69	Slovakia
Scoring by half: 39–44, 47–25
Pts: Goodes 21; Rebs: Fleisher 9 Asts: Goodes 9		Pts: Uhnák 16; Rebs: Michalík 5 Asts: Uhnák, Marko 2

Sport Palace, Tel Aviv
Attendance: 1,000
Referees: Priamos Ioannides (CYP), David Turner (ENG)

11 October 1995
21:00

Boxscore

Greece	77–82	Belarus
Scoring by half: 48–38, 29–44
Pts: Fassoulas 14; Rebs: Bakatsias 11; Asts: Bakatsias, Oikonomou 6		Pts: Dayneko 25; Rebs: Dayneko 10; Asts: Kuzmin 7

Athens
Attendance: 2,500
Referees: Danko Radić (CRO), Stefko Stanev (BUL)

12 November 1995
17:00

Boxscore

Georgia	84–89	Israel
Scoring by half: 44–38, 40–51
Pts: Sanadze, Stepania 15; Rebs: Karabaki 8 Asts: Vashakidze, Sanadze, Stepania, Natsvlishvili 1		Pts: Jamchi 26; Rebs: Fleisher 6 Asts: Turgeman 2

Tbilisi Sports Palace, Tbilisi
Attendance: 9,000
Referees: Karel Bruna (CZE), Grzegorz Ziemblicki (POL)

12 November 1995
17:00

Boxscore

Belarus	94–85	Slovakia
Scoring by half: 49–41, 45–44
Pts: Dayneko 39; Rebs: Dayneko 10; Asts: Griszczuk 8		Pts: Faith, Uhnák 24; Rebs: Mičuda 9 Asts: Uhnák, Orgler 5

Minsk
Attendance: 3,000
Referees: Ion Olaru (ROU), Plamen Simeonov (BUL)

12 November 1995
10:30

Boxscore

Bosnia and Herzegovina	73–76	Greece
Scoring by half: 45–29, 28–47
Pts: Marković Zorić 32; Rebs: Marković Zorić, Lerić, Korlatović, Mutapčić 5 Asts: Mutapčić 5		Pts: Sigalas 25; Rebs: Fassoulas 7 Asts: Oikonomou 6

Berlin
Attendance: 3,000
Referees: Armand De Keyser (BEL), Romualdas Brazauskas (LTU)

15 November 1995
17:00

Boxscore

Belarus	102–76	Georgia
Scoring by half: 48–37, 54–39
Pts: Dayneko 27; Rebs: Dayneko 9 Asts: Kuzmin, Griszczuk, Dayneko 3		Pts: Natsvlishvili 23; Rebs: Natsvlishvili 6 Asts: Sanadze 2

Minsk
Attendance: 3,500
Referees: Agnis Pērkons (LAT), Volodymyr Drabikovskyi (UKR)

15 November 1995
19:00

Boxscore

Israel	67–73	Bosnia and Herzegovina
Scoring by half: 34–44, 33–29
Pts: Jamchi 20; Rebs: Henefeld 7 Asts: Daniel 3		Pts: Marković Zorić 40; Rebs: Mutapčić 8 Asts: Bećiragić 6

Hadar Yosef NSC, Tel Aviv
Attendance: 1,200
Referees: Kamen Toshev (BUL), Stefano Cazzaro (ITA)

15 November 1995
20:00

Boxscore

Slovakia	64–80	Greece
Scoring by half: 36–41, 28–39
Pts: Faith, Matický 17; Rebs: Faith, Matický 7 Asts: Orgler 3		Pts: Sigalas 26; Rebs: Fassoulas 6 Asts: Giannakis 6

Bratislava
Attendance: 3,000
Referees: Tomislav Jovančić (SRB), Virginijus Dovidavičius (LTU)

28 February 1996
18:45

Boxscore

Greece	100–66	Georgia
Scoring by half: 54–30, 46–36
Pts: Angelidis 17; Rebs: Fassoulas 10; Asts: Kakiousis 6		Pts: Derjugin, Stepania 13; Rebs: Stepania 9 Asts: Vashakidze 4

Athens
Attendance: 7,500
Referees: Tomislav Jovančić (SRB), Pierluigi D'este (ITA)

28 February 1996
20:00

Boxscore

Bosnia and Herzegovina	84–74	Slovakia
Scoring by half: 45–37, 39–37
Pts: Marković Zorić 30; Rebs: Avdić 8 Asts: Bećiragić 5		Pts: Lovík 19; Rebs: Matický 8 Asts: Matický 4

Berlin
Attendance: 2,200
Referees: Leszek Rakoczy (POL), Lars Klaar (SWE)

29 February 1996
19:00

Boxscore

Israel	95–73	Belarus
Scoring by half: 44–33, 51–40
Pts: Steinhauer 19; Rebs: Steinhauer 7 Asts: Turgeman 5		Pts: Dayneko 17; Rebs: Kuzmin 5 Asts: Svetnik, Kuzmin, Klemez 3

Sport Palace, Tel Aviv
Attendance: 1,000
Referees: Memduh Öget (TUR), Tiziano Zancanella (ITA)

30 October 1996
10:00

Boxscore

Georgia	91–71	Slovakia
Scoring by half: 48–41, 43–30
Pts: Stepania 22; Rebs: Stepania 9 Asts: Ustashvili 7		Pts: Uhnák 18; Rebs: Mičuda 5 Asts: Drobný, Mičuda, Orgler, Lovík 2

Tbilisi Sports Palace, Tbilisi
Attendance: 8,200
Referees: Leszek Rakoczy (POL), József Harsányi (HUN)

30 October 1996
19:00

Boxscore

Belarus	61–73 (OT)	Bosnia and Herzegovina
Scoring by half: 33–31, 25–27 Overtime: 3–15
Pts: Griszczuk 20; Rebs: Svetnik 9 Asts: Baidakou, Jeloudok, Svetnik, Kuzmin, Griszczuk, Klemez 1		Pts: Bećiragić 27; Rebs: Lerić 7 Asts: Bećiragić 4

Minsk
Attendance: 4,500
Referees: Kamen Toshev (BUL), Grzegorz Ziemblicki (POL)

30 October 1996
20:30

Boxscore

Israel	84–86 (OT)	Greece
Scoring by half: 29–39, 42–32 Overtime: 13–15
Pts: Kattash 19; Rebs: Jamchi 5 Asts: Kattash 3		Pts: Alvertis 24; Rebs: Rentzias 8 Asts: Bakatsias, Patavoukas, Alvertis, Koronios 1

Sport Palace, Tel Aviv
Attendance: 7,000
Referees: Miguel Betancor (ESP), Dubravko Muhvić (CRO)

27 November 1996
19:00

Boxscore

Belarus	55–79	Greece
Scoring by half: 21–37, 34–42
Pts: Baidakou 23; Rebs: Svetnik 7 Asts: Kuzmin, Klemez 2		Pts: Kakiouzis 18; Rebs: Rentzias 11; Asts: Sigalas, Kakiousis 2

Minsk
Attendance: 3,700
Referees: Ion Olaru (ROU), Tiziano Zancanella (ITA)

27 November 1996
19:45

Boxscore

Slovakia	71–99	Israel
Scoring by half: 33–49, 38–50
Pts: Lovík 18; Rebs: Matický 8 Asts: Matický, Drobný, Jakabovič 2		Pts: Kattash 23; Rebs: Henefeld 9 Asts: Sheffer 4

Prievidza
Attendance: 1,500
Referees: Danko Radić (CRO), Erich Kratschmer (AUT)

27 November 1996
20:00

Boxscore

Bosnia and Herzegovina	80–71	Georgia
Scoring by half: 40–34, 40–37
Pts: Marković Zorić 34; Rebs: Bukva 9 Asts: Bećiragić 10		Pts: Stepania 19; Rebs: Stepania 11; Asts: Stepania 4

Berlin
Attendance: 1,500
Referees: Mika Moberg (FIN), Markus Hesse (GER)

18 December 1996
18:00

Boxscore

Slovakia	81–86	Belarus
Scoring by half: 44–48, 37–38
Pts: Matický 18; Rebs: Faith, Matický 5 Asts: Jakabovič, Černický, Michalík, Liska 2		Pts: Baidakou 29; Rebs: Jeloudok 8 Asts: Kuzmin 7

Pezinok
Attendance: 1,000
Referees: Stojan Fišer (SLO), Richard Führer (AUT)

18 December 1996
21:00

Boxscore

Greece	73–51	Bosnia and Herzegovina
Scoring by half: 28–20, 45–31
Pts: Rentzias 19; Rebs: Rentzias 12; Asts: Koronios 5		Pts: Lerić 18; Rebs: Bećiragić 6 Asts: Bećiragić 2

Athens
Attendance: 6,000
Referees: Gennaro Colucci (ITA), Volodymyr Drabikovskyi (UKR)

19 December 1996
20:45

Boxscore

Israel	86–74	Georgia
Scoring by half: 42–41, 44–33
Pts: Daniel 22; Rebs: Kattash 6 Asts: Gordon 4		Pts: Stepania 22; Rebs: Stepania 13; Asts: Sanadze, Ustashvili, Chkheidze 2

Sport Palace, Tel Aviv
Attendance: 1,500
Referees: Stefko Stanev (BUL), Aleš Kamnikar (SLO)

29 January 1997
18:00

Boxscore

Georgia	80–78	Belarus
Scoring by half: 32–36, 48–42
Pts: Karabaki 31; Rebs: Natsvlishvili 10; Asts: Karabaki 2		Pts: Klemez 28; Rebs: Svetnik, Pyntsikau 4 Asts: Klemez 2

Tbilisi Sports Palace, Tbilisi
Attendance: 5,000
Referees: Romualdas Brazauskas (LTU), Andres Tobi (EST)

29 January 1997
20:00

Boxscore

Bosnia and Herzegovina	72–67	Israel
Scoring by half: 39–31, 33–36
Pts: Marković Zorić, Firić 15; Rebs: Alihodžić 7 Asts: Firić 5		Pts: Kattash 18; Rebs: Fleisher 5 Asts: Kattash 4

Berlin
Attendance: 2,400
Referees: Marek Nowicki (POL), Pascal Dorizon (FRA)

29 January 1997
21:00

Boxscore

Greece	80–56	Slovakia
Scoring by half: 42–36, 38–20
Pts: Giannoulis 18; Rebs: Giannoulis 7 Asts: Sigalas 5		Pts: Mičuda 13; Rebs: Mičuda 9 Asts: Mičuda 5

Pyrgos
Attendance: 3,500
Referees: Davorin Nakić (CRO), Saša Pukl (SLO)

26 February 1997
17:00

Boxscore

Georgia	61–65	Greece
Scoring by half: 38–32, 23–33
Pts: Stepania 14; Rebs: Stepania 9 Asts: Tortladze, Stepania, Chkheidze 1		Pts: Oikonomou 16; Rebs: Koronios 11; Asts: Chatzis, Sigalas 2

Tbilisi Sports Palace, Tbilisi
Attendance: 8,000
Referees: Kamen Toshev (BUL), Grzegorz Ziemblicki (POL)

26 February 1997
18:00

Boxscore

Slovakia	87–108	Bosnia and Herzegovina
Scoring by half: 44–53, 43–55
Pts: Petruška 21; Rebs: Mičuda 8 Asts: Michalík 4		Pts: Marković Zorić 28; Rebs: Marković Zorić 8 Asts: Marković Zorić, Bećiragić 5

Malacky
Referees: Peter Poiger (AUT), Krzysztof Koralewski (POL)

26 February 1997
20:00

Boxscore

Belarus	57–65	Israel
Scoring by half: 23–34, 34–31
Pts: Klemez 21; Rebs: Baidakou 11; Asts: Kuzmin 3		Pts: Sheffer 12; Rebs: Fleisher 11; Asts: Turgeman, Sheffer, Arditty 1

Minsk
Attendance: 2,500
Referees: Tomislav Jovančić (SRB), Necip Kapanlı (TUR)

=== Group B ===
Team	Pld	W	L	PF	PA	PD	Pts	Tie
Russia	10	10	0	966	727	+239	20	
Germany	10	7	3	810	793	+17	17	1–1, +5
Latvia	10	7	3	813	776	+37	17	1–1, -5
Estonia	10	4	6	823	857	−34	14	
England	10	1	9	723	875	−152	11	1–1, +1
Portugal	10	1	9	740	847	−107	11	1–1, -1

8 October 1995
17:00

Boxscore

Russia	98–75	Germany
Scoring by half: 42–38, 56–37
Pts: Kudelin 22; Rebs: Mikhailov, Fetisov 7 Asts: Karasev 12		Pts: Rödl, Baeck 14; Rebs: Hupmann 5 Asts: Rödl 8

Moscow
Attendance: 1,000
Referees: Iztok Rems (SLO), Vladimir Atanasov (BUL)

8 October 1995
18:00

Boxscore

Estonia	105–85	Portugal
Scoring by half: 61–38, 44–47
Pts: Kullamäe 25; Rebs: Metstak 11; Asts: Müürsepp, Pehka 3		Pts: Gómez Marques Pinto 16; Rebs: Dias da Silva 8 Asts: Rodrigues Neves 4

Tallinn
Attendance: 2,000
Referees: Karel Bruna (CZE), Mika Moberg (FIN)

8 October 1995
18:00

Boxscore

Latvia	94–67	England
Scoring by half: 44–32, 50–35
Pts: Laksa 21; Rebs: Bagatskis 8 Asts: Miglinieks 8		Pts: Brown 22; Rebs: Huggins 9 Asts: Brown 2

Riga Sports Palace, Riga
Attendance: 4,500
Referees: Leszek Rakoczy (POL), Anguel Ivanov (BUL)

11 October 1995
18:30

Boxscore

Russia	90–70	Portugal
Scoring by half: 42–31, 48–39
Pts: Kisurin 23; Rebs: Kisurin 15; Asts: Karasev, Kudelin, Babkov 4		Pts: Gómez Marques Pinto 17; Rebs: Gómez Marques Pinto 6 Asts: Rodrigues Neves 8

Moscow
Attendance: 1,800
Referees: Tihomir Bubalo (SRB), Ladislav Janáč (SVK)

11 October 1995
19:30

Boxscore

Germany	100–82	Latvia
Scoring by half: 44–44, 56–38
Pts: Hupmann 22; Rebs: Hupmann 12; Asts: Nürnberger 6		Pts: Laksa 23; Rebs: Laksa 13; Asts: Miglinieks 7

Sporthalle Oberwerth, Koblenz
Attendance: 1,000
Referees: Zoran Grbac (CRO), Marek Nowicki (POL)

11 October 1995
20:00

Boxscore

England	89–91	Estonia
Scoring by half: 40–49, 49–42
Pts: Bucknall 31; Rebs: Bucknall 6 Asts: Brown, Bucknall 3		Pts: Metstak 20; Rebs: Noormets 9 Asts: Pehka 3

Leicester Arena, Leicester
Attendance: 1,500
Referees: Bruno Gasperin (FRA), Víctor Mas (ESP)

12 November 1995
17:15

Boxscore

Portugal	56–65	Latvia
Scoring by half: 23–33, 33–32
Pts: Wayne Rocha 14; Rebs: Dias da Silva, Wayne Rocha 7 Asts: Rodrigues Neves 4		Pts: Zeidaks 17; Rebs: Helmanis 10; Asts: Štelmahers, Zeidaks 2

Tondela
Attendance: 3,000
Referees: Leonidas Spiridonos (GRE), Fabio Facchini (ITA)

12 November 1995
18:00

Boxscore

Estonia	73–88	Russia
Scoring by half: 33–50, 40–38
Pts: Babenko 18; Rebs: Babenko 10; Asts: Müürsepp 6		Pts: Karasev 24; Rebs: Mikhailov 13; Asts: Yudin 3

Tallinn
Attendance: 3,000
Referees: Lars Klaar (SWE), Ilkka Weijo (FIN)

12 November 1995
18:00

Boxscore

England	66–75	Germany
Scoring by half: 44–39, 22–36
Pts: Austin 16; Rebs: Gardiner, Bucknall, Gordon, Huggins 6 Asts: Bucknall 3		Pts: Harnisch 19; Rebs: Hupmann 12; Asts: Rödl 5

Arena of Sheffield Sharks, Sheffield
Attendance: 1,100
Referees: Kristinn Albertsson (ISL), Gennaro Colucci (ITA)

15 November 1995
16:30

Boxscore

Portugal	72–75	England
Scoring by half: 32–38, 40–37
Pts: Dos Santos Monteiro 19; Rebs: Plowden, Wayne Rocha 7 Asts: Rodrigues Neves 5		Pts: Bucknall 17; Rebs: Huggins 11; Asts: Brown, Baker, Scantlebury, Bucknall 1

Ponte de Sor
Attendance: 2,500
Referees: Eduardo Sancha (ESP), Christophe Vauthier (FRA)

15 November 1995
18:00

Boxscore

Latvia	71–112	Russia
Scoring by half: 34–49, 37–63
Pts: Bagatskis 13; Rebs: Helmanis 7 Asts: Štelmahers, Bagatskis 2		Pts: Ivanov 29; Rebs: Mikhailov 12; Asts: Karasev 4

Riga Sports Palace, Riga
Attendance: 4,500
Referees: Konrad Tomczyk (POL), Pekka Saros (FIN)

16 November 1995
19:30

Boxscore

Germany	85–66	Estonia
Scoring by half: 33–41, 52–25
Pts: Harnisch 27; Rebs: Hupmann 11; Asts: Rödl 2		Pts: Pehka 18; Rebs: Babenko 7 Asts: Pehka 2

Arena of Brandt Hagen, Hagen
Attendance: 2,000
Referees: Philippe Mailhabiau (FRA), Jan Herweijer (NED)

28 February 1996
18:30

Boxscore

Russia	114–59	England
Scoring by half: 40–32, 74–27
Pts: Babkov 21; Rebs: Mikhailov 13; Asts: Kudelin 13		Pts: Whyte 17; Rebs: Austin, Huggins 7 Asts: Baker 7

Moscow
Attendance: 1,100
Referees: Nikolai Nedeltchev (BUL), Virginijus Dovidavičius (LTU)

28 February 1996
19:00

Boxscore

Estonia	63–79	Latvia
Scoring by half: 36–38, 27–41
Pts: Metstak 24; Rebs: Metstak 13; Asts: Kullamäe 5		Pts: Štelmahers 20; Rebs: Helmanis 9 Asts: Štelmahers 4

Tallinn
Attendance: 2,300
Referees: Volodymyr Drabikovskyi (UKR), Ulf Öhrman (SWE)

1 March 1996
19:30

Boxscore

Germany	78–68	Portugal
Scoring by half: 36–31, 42–37
Pts: Welp 17; Rebs: Welp 8 Asts: Harnisch 5		Pts: A. Selores Ramos 13; Rebs: Dias da Silva 5 Asts: Rodrigues Neves 4

Sporthalle Oberwerth, Koblenz
Attendance: 2,800
Referees: Fernand Hengel (LUX), Eric De Neve (BEL)

30 October 1996
20:00

Boxscore

England	66–76	Latvia
Scoring by half: 29–38, 37–38
Pts: Bucknall 24; Rebs: Amaechi 13; Asts: Baker 5		Pts: Bagatskis 22; Rebs: Bondarenko 8 Asts: Štelmahers 5

Leicester Arena, Leicester
Attendance: 1,600
Referees: Goran Radonjić (FRA), Jan Gjettermann (DEN)

30 October 1996
20:00

Boxscore

Germany	74–102	Russia
Scoring by half: 48–45, 26–57
Pts: Welp 14; Rebs: Hupmann 9 Asts: Harnisch 3		Pts: Babkov 22; Rebs: Mikhailov 8 Asts: Kudelin, Kisurin, Fetisov 2

Alsterdorfer Sporthalle, Hamburg
Attendance: 4,320
Referees: Lars Klaar (SWE), Nikolaos Pitsilkas (GRE)

31 October 1996
20:00

Boxscore

Portugal	92–98	Estonia
Scoring by half: 49–44, 43–54
Pts: Das Neves Alves 20; Rebs: Dias da Silva 11; Asts: Rodrigues Neves 3		Pts: Kuusmaa 27; Rebs: Noormets 7 Asts: Sokk 5

Guarda
Attendance: 2,000
Referees: Juan Carlos Mitjana (ESP), Fernand Hengel (LUX)

27 November 1996
16:30

Boxscore

Portugal	75–104	Russia
Scoring by half: 50–54, 25–50
Pts: Dias da Silva, Gómez Marques Pinto 18; Rebs: Gómez Marques Pinto 6 Asts: Rodrigues Neves, Amorim dos Santos 2		Pts: Babkov 17; Rebs: Nosov 8 Asts: Babkov 3

Lisbon
Attendance: 1,400
Referees: William Jones (WAL), Joseph Hernandez (GIB)

27 November 1996
18:00

Boxscore

Estonia	104–77	England
Scoring by half: 53–44, 51–33
Pts: Kuusmaa 24; Rebs: Rumma 7 Asts: Sokk 7		Pts: Amaechi 20; Rebs: Amaechi 7 Asts: Bucknall 6

Tallinn
Attendance: 3,000
Referees: Pekka Saros (FIN), Ivan Zachara (CZE)

27 November 1996
18:00

Boxscore

Latvia	98–76	Germany
Scoring by half: 57–48, 41–28
Pts: Bagatskis 27; Rebs: Helmanis 8 Asts: Štelmahers, Bagatskis 3		Pts: Wucherer 15; Rebs: Welp 12; Asts: Rödl 6

Riga Sports Palace, Riga
Attendance: 3,500
Referees: Ivo Dolinek (CZE), Wiesław Zych (POL)

18 December 1996
17:00

Boxscore

Russia	91–69	Estonia
Scoring by half: 50–29, 41–40
Pts: Mikhailov 20; Rebs: Mikhailov 8 Asts: Babkov 5		Pts: Babenko 21; Rebs: Babenko 14; Asts: Kuusmaa 5

Moscow
Attendance: 2,500
Referees: Aliaksandr Yarotski (BLR), Roman Ryzhyk (UKR)

18 December 1996
18:00

Boxscore

Latvia	81–76	Portugal
Scoring by half: 45–35, 36–41
Pts: Bagatskis 28; Rebs: Bondarenko 9 Asts: Štelmahers 7		Pts: Gómez Marques Pinto 19; Rebs: Gómez Marques Pinto 10; Asts: Amorim dos Santos 10

Riga Sports Palace, Riga
Attendance: 3,000
Referees: Ryszard Jabłoński (POL), Karel Bruna (CZE)

18 December 1996
19:30

Boxscore

Germany	88–67	England
Scoring by half: 46–32, 42–35
Pts: Rödl 19; Rebs: Welp 11; Asts: Rödl 8		Pts: Dunkley 14; Rebs: Dunkley 11; Asts: Huggins 4

ZAB Halle, Dessau
Attendance: 3,000
Referees: Zdeněk Šedivý (CZE), Alojz Ceizel (SVK)

29 January 1997
17:00

Boxscore

Russia	86–82	Latvia
Scoring by half: 46–37, 40–45
Pts: Mikhailov 23; Rebs: Mikhailov 12; Asts: Kudelin 7		Pts: Sneps 20; Rebs: Bondarenko 9 Asts: Štelmahers 6

Moscow
Attendance: 3,500
Referees: Kęstutis Pilipauskas (LTU), Borys Shulga (UKR)

29 January 1997
19:00

Boxscore

Estonia	80–86	Germany
Scoring by half: 41–46, 39–40
Pts: Noormets 19; Rebs: Sokk, Babenko 3 Asts: Kuusmaa 5		Pts: Harnisch 18; Rebs: Welp 7 Asts: Harnisch, Koch 3

Tallinn
Attendance: 2,000
Referees: Ilkka Weijo (FIN), Ulf Öhrman (SWE)

29 January 1997
20:00

Boxscore

England	78–80	Portugal
Scoring by half: 40–31, 38–49
Pts: Bucknall 24; Rebs: Amaechi 16; Asts: Huggins 4		Pts: Azevedo de Seixas 22; Rebs: Dias da Silva 6 Asts: Azevedo de Seixas, Rodrigues Neves, Oliveira Marçal 2

Newcastle Arena, Newcastle upon Tyne
Attendance: 3,500
Referees: Kristinn Albertsson (ISL), Michel Zegwaard (NED)

26 February 1997
18:00

Boxscore

Latvia	85–74	Estonia
Scoring by half: 46–34, 39–40
Pts: Helmanis 18; Rebs: Helmanis 7 Asts: Štelmahers 2		Pts: Metstak 21; Rebs: Metstak 13; Asts: Pehka 6

Riga Sports Palace, Riga
Attendance: 4,000
Referees: Marek Nowicki (POL), Virginijus Dovidavičius (LTU)

26 February 1997
20:00

Boxscore

England	79–81	Russia
Scoring by half: 38–37, 41–44
Pts: Bucknall 24; Rebs: Dunkley 18; Asts: Bucknall 3		Pts: Mikhailov 26; Rebs: Mikhailov 11; Asts: Karasev 6

Spectrum Arena, Guildford
Attendance: 2,000
Referees: Fernand Hengel (LUX), Alexander Faassen (NED)

26 February 1997
20:15

Boxscore

Portugal	66–73	Germany
Scoring by half: 30–40, 36–33
Pts: Oliveira Marçal 23; Rebs: Gómez Marques Pinto, De Sousa Moreira N.S. 5 Asts: Amorim dos Santos 4		Pts: Harnisch 22; Rebs: Hupmann 13; Asts: Wucherer 3

Lousada
Attendance: 2,000
Referees: Bruno Gasperin (FRA), Anthony Colgan (AUT)

=== Group C ===
Team	Pld	W	L	PF	PA	PD	Pts	Tie
Italy	10	9	1	838	677	+161	19	
Slovenia	10	7	3	760	661	+99	17	
Macedonia	10	4	6	793	846	−53	14	1–1, +17
Hungary	10	4	6	719	797	−78	14	1–1, -17
Czech Republic	10	3	7	798	836	−38	13	1–1, +4
Finland	10	3	7	817	908	−91	13	1–1, -4

8 October 1995
13:15

Boxscore

Finland	94–75	Hungary
Scoring by half: 46–38, 48–37
Pts: Kuisma 19; Rebs: Tahvanainen 6 Asts: Lehtonen 4		Pts: Dávid 21; Rebs: Gulyás 9 Asts: Bencze 5

Helsinki
Attendance: 1,025
Referees: Romualdas Brazauskas (LTU), Agnis Pērkons (LAT)

8 October 1995
17:00

Boxscore

Czech Republic	85–72	Macedonia
Scoring by half: 43–41, 42–31
Pts: Okáč, Bečka 19; Rebs: Bečka 9 Asts: Babka 6		Pts: Naumoski 35; Rebs: Blazevski 5 Asts: Naumoski 5

Nový Jičín
Referees: Armand De Keyser (BEL), Andreas Roth (AUT)

8 October 1995
17:00

Boxscore

Italy	76–63	Slovenia
Scoring by half: 42–33, 34–30
Pts: Carera 15; Rebs: Carera 9 Asts: Coldebella 5		Pts: Gorenc 19; Rebs: Đurišić 9 Asts: Thaler 4

Sassari
Attendance: 5,000
Referees: Manuel Alzuria (ESP), Reuven Virovnik (ISR)

11 October 1995
17:00

Boxscore

Italy	94–68	Hungary
Scoring by half: 49–34, 45–34
Pts: Conti 19; Rebs: Conti, Carera 7 Asts: Pieri 3		Pts: Dávid 30; Rebs: Dávid 8 Asts: Szájer, Boros, Czigler 1

Fabriano
Attendance: 5,000
Referees: Nikolaos Pitsilkas (GRE), Bruno Vauthier (FRA)

11 October 1995
19:30

Boxscore

Slovenia	81–82	Czech Republic
Scoring by half: 38–37, 43–45
Pts: Alibegović 25; Rebs: Nesterović 7 Asts: Milič 3		Pts: Bečka 23; Rebs: Okáč 7 Asts: Babka, Okáč, Bečka 1

Celje
Attendance: 1,200
Referees: Ryszard Jabłoński (POL), Necip Kapanlı (TUR)

11 October 1995
20:00

Boxscore

Macedonia	94–102 (OT)	Finland
Scoring by half: 54–37, 29–46 Overtime: 11–19
Pts: Naumoski 40; Rebs: Bocevski 10; Asts: Naumoski 5		Pts: Kuisma 33; Rebs: Kuisma 11; Asts: Lehtonen 3

Skopje
Attendance: 1,800
Referees: Jozef Jančovič (SVK), Bogdan Bădilă (ROU)

12 November 1995
11:00

Boxscore

Hungary	85–80	Czech Republic
Scoring by half: 47–38, 38–42
Pts: Zsebe, Boros 15; Rebs: Gulyás 5 Asts: Zsebe 4		Pts: Bečka 21; Rebs: Bečka 7 Asts: Benes, Babka, Okáč 1

Miskolc
Attendance: 1,000
Referees: Davorin Nakić (CRO), Lazaros Voreadis (GRE)

12 November 1995
13:15

Boxscore

Finland	68–92	Italy
Scoring by half: 39–49, 29–43
Pts: Kuisma, Lehtonen 23; Rebs: Möttölä, Markkanen 7 Asts: Larkio, Lehtonen 2		Pts: Pittis 15; Rebs: Conti, Frosini 6 Asts: Pittis 6

Helsinki
Attendance: 1,460
Referees: Sergey Bulanov (RUS), Ulf Öhrman (SWE)

12 November 1995
19:00

Boxscore

Macedonia	73–59	Slovenia
Scoring by half: 38–29, 35–30
Pts: Jovanovski 14; Rebs: Stankovik 11; Asts: Vojnovik, Naumoski 2		Pts: Alibegović 22; Rebs: Alibegović 5 Asts: Zdovc 1

Skopje
Attendance: 2,500
Referees: Mehmet Keseratar (TUR), Anguel Ivanov (BUL)

15 November 1995
16:00

Boxscore

Hungary	82–80	Macedonia
Scoring by half: 40–39, 42–41
Pts: Dávid 17; Rebs: Czigler 6 Asts: Boros 3		Pts: Naumoski 39; Rebs: Bocevski 7 Asts: Petrusev, Naumoski, Blazevski 1

Miskolc
Attendance: 2,200
Referees: Efim Resser (GER), Ladislav Janáč (SVK)

15 November 1995
17:00

Boxscore

Czech Republic	68–77	Italy
Scoring by half: 27–36, 41–41
Pts: Svoboda 20; Rebs: Bečka 12; Asts: Babka 4		Pts: Coldebella 17; Rebs: Conti 44; Asts: Bonora 5

Prague
Attendance: 1,000
Referees: Kęstutis Pilipauskas (LTU), Wiesław Zych (POL)

15 November 1995
18:30

Boxscore

Slovenia	90–61	Finland
Scoring by half: 40–22, 50–39
Pts: Zdovc 25; Rebs: Alibegović 7 Asts: Zdovc 9		Pts: Möttölä 13; Rebs: Kuisma 8 Asts: Lehtonen 5

Tri Lilije Hall, Laško
Attendance: 1,500
Referees: Krzysztof Koralewski (POL), Richard Führer (AUT)

28 February 1996
15:15

Boxscore

Italy	95–62	Macedonia
Scoring by half: 40–28, 55–34
Pts: Myers 28; Rebs: Frosini 7 Asts: Bonora, Myers, Moretti, Ancillotto, Galanda 2		Pts: Jovanovski 29; Rebs: Bocevski 10; Asts: Vojnovik, Jovanovski 1

Gorizia
Attendance: 4,500
Referees: Fatih Dalay (TUR), Alojz Ceizel (SVK)

28 February 1996
20:00

Boxscore

Finland	113–93	Czech Republic
Scoring by half: 66–50, 47–43
Pts: Larkio 25; Rebs: Pehkonen 12; Asts: Lehtonen, Klinga 6		Pts: Svoboda 25; Rebs: Bečka 7 Asts: Czudek 7

Helsinki
Attendance: 1,548
Referees: Boris Schmidt (GER), Krzysztof Koralewski (POL)

28 February 1996
20:00

Boxscore

Slovenia	67–49	Hungary
Scoring by half: 38–25, 29–24
Pts: Alibegović 25; Rebs: Milič 7 Asts: Milič 5		Pts: Czigler 10; Rebs: Dávid, Czigler 6 Asts: Hoffmann, Dávid, Zsebe, Mészáros 1

Šentjur
Referees: Kamen Toshev (BUL), Peter Poiger (AUT)

29 October 1996
20:15

Boxscore

Macedonia	102–93	Czech Republic
Scoring by half: 53–46, 49–47
Pts: Naumoski 39; Rebs: Bocevski 9 Asts: Naumoski 5		Pts: Okáč, Bečka 21; Rebs: Okáč 10; Asts: Hrubý, Kameník, Okáč 2

Skopje
Attendance: 2,000
Referees: Hermann Latz (GER), Necip Kapanlı (TUR)

30 October 1996
16:00

Boxscore

Hungary	89–77	Finland
Scoring by half: 38–25, 51–52
Pts: Gulyás 22; Rebs: Gulyas, Sitku 4 Asts: Boros 2		Pts: Luhtanen 20; Rebs: Markkanen, Luhtanen 6 Asts: Lehtonen 3

Miskolc
Attendance: 2,000
Referees: Marek Nowicki (POL), Tihomir Bubalo (SRB)

30 October 1996
20:00

Boxscore

Slovenia	72–55	Italy
Scoring by half: 33–31, 39–24
Pts: Alibegović 22; Rebs: Zdovc 5 Asts: Zdovc 3		Pts: Fučka 23; Rebs: Gay III 9 Asts: Gentile 3

Ljubljana
Attendance: 3,500
Referees: Efim Resser (GER), Ladislav Janáč (SVK)

27 November 1996
16:30

Boxscore

Czech Republic	65–84	Slovenia
Scoring by half: 21–42, 44–42
Pts: Czudek 15; Rebs: Treml 4 Asts: Hrubý 3		Pts: Alibegović 23; Rebs: Gorenc 4 Asts: Gorenc 2

Nový Jičín
Attendance: 1,200
Referees: Horst Weichert (GER), Mikhail Davydov (RUS)

27 November 1996
20:00

Boxscore

Finland	77–85	Macedonia
Scoring by half: 43–40, 34–45
Pts: Pehkonen 19; Rebs: Pehkonen 10; Asts: Lehtonen 5		Pts: Naumoski 31; Rebs: Stankovik 9 Asts: Naumoski 6

Helsinki
Attendance: 1,600
Referees: Armand De Keyser (BEL), Rikard Johansson (SWE)

28 November 1996
16:00

Boxscore

Hungary	66–78	Italy
Scoring by half: 25–39, 41–39
Pts: Gulyás 20; Rebs: Gulyás 12; Asts: Sitku, Czigler 1		Pts: Esposito 21; Rebs: Carera, Fučka 4 Asts: Coldebella 3

Budapest
Attendance: 2,500
Referees: Almir Akšamija (BIH), Krzysztof Koralewski (POL)

18 December 1996
16:30

Boxscore

Czech Republic	80–82	Hungary
Scoring by half: 34–34, 46–48
Pts: Okáč 21; Rebs: Bečka 5 Asts: Czudek, Treml 3		Pts: Halm 17; Rebs: Orosz 4 Asts: Dávid, Boros, Mészáros 1

Jičín
Attendance: 1,000
Referees: Kamen Toshev (BUL), Grzegorz Ziemblicki(POL)

18 December 1996
20:00

Boxscore

Slovenia	87–61	Macedonia
Scoring by half: 36–34, 51–27
Pts: Alibegović 23; Rebs: Nesterović 12; Asts: Zdovc 4		Pts: Naumoski 20; Rebs: Jovanovski 6 Asts: Jovanovski 5

Šoštanj
Attendance: 1,500
Referees: Zoran Grbac (CRO), Peter Poiger (AUT)

19 December 1996
15:30

Boxscore

Italy	101–73	Finland
Scoring by half: 38–37, 63–36
Pts: Myers 24; Rebs: Frosini 11; Asts: Esposito 3		Pts: Kuisma 25; Rebs: Pehkonen 7 Asts: Lehtonen 2

Perugia
Attendance: 4,000
Referees: Andrej Jelen (SLO), Srđan Dožai (CRO)

29 January 1997
20:00

Boxscore

Finland	77–90	Slovenia
Scoring by half: 40–58, 37–32
Pts: Luhtanen 26; Rebs: Luhtanen 5 Asts: Pehkonen 4		Pts: Milič 31; Rebs: Milič 8 Asts: Zdovc 8

Helsinki
Referees: Atso Matsalu (EST), Viliam Koller (SVK)

29 January 1997
20:00

Boxscore

Macedonia	80–61	Hungary
Scoring by half: 43–25, 37–36
Pts: Naumoski 34; Rebs: Jovanovski 7 Asts: Blazevski 3		Pts: Dávid 23; Rebs: Gulyás 7 Asts: Halm, Dávid, Sitku 1

Skopje
Attendance: 1,200
Referees: Nikolai Nedeltchev (BUL), Virginijus Dovidavičius (LTU)

30 January 1997
18:30

Boxscore

Italy	65–53	Czech Republic
Scoring by half: 29–31, 36–22
Pts: Moretti 17; Rebs: Frosini 7 Asts: Pittis, Moretti 1		Pts: Klapetek 14; Rebs: Zajíc, Klapetek, Stanek, Bečka 3 Asts: Zajíc 1

Treviglio
Attendance: 3,500
Referees: Danko Radić (CRO), Serge De Coster (BEL)

26 February 1997
17:00

Boxscore

Macedonia	84–105	Italy
Scoring by half: 42–59, 42–46
Pts: Naumoski 28; Rebs: Simik, Jovanovski 4 Asts: Naumoski 3		Pts: Moretti 18; Rebs: Marconato 11; Asts: Bonora 9

Skopje
Attendance: 2,500
Referees: Ladislav Janáč (SVK), Recep Ankaralı (TUR)

26 February 1997
17:30

Boxscore

Czech Republic	99–75	Finland
Scoring by half: 48–43, 51–32
Pts: Treml 25; Rebs: Bečka 6 Asts: Czudek 9		Pts: Luhtanen 21; Rebs: Markkanen 5 Asts: Pehkonen, Larkio, Luhtanen, Lehtonen 1

Prague
Referees: Leszek Rakoczy (POL), Richard Führer (AUT)

26 February 1997
18:00

Boxscore

Hungary	62–67 (OT)	Slovenia
Scoring by half: 20–33, 36–23 Overtime: 6–11
Pts: Sitku 18; Rebs: Sitku 6 Asts: Bencze, Dávid 3		Pts: Gorenc 22; Rebs: Jurković 10; Asts: Gorenc 4

Varosi Sportcsarnok, Zalaegerszeg
Attendance: 3,000
Referees: Jozef Jančovič (SVK), Andreas Roth (AUT)

=== Group D ===
Team	Pld	W	L	PF	PA	PD	Pts	Tie
Ukraine	10	8	2	834	705	+129	18	
Croatia	10	7	3	823	647	+176	17	1–1, +12
Turkey	10	7	3	732	671	+61	17	1–1, -12
Bulgaria	10	5	5	776	822	−46	15	
Netherlands	10	3	7	722	775	−53	13	
Romania	10	0	10	629	896	−267	10	

8 October 1995
16:00

Boxscore

Bulgaria	85–82	Netherlands
Scoring by half: 40–33, 45–49
Pts: Antov 24; Rebs: Natov 7 Asts: Mladenov, Antov 3		Pts: Huijbens 17; Rebs: te Velde, van Dinten 7 Asts: Krieger, van Dinten 2

Arena of Spartak, Pleven
Attendance: 1,500
Referees: Konstantinos Koromilas (GRE), György Váradi (HUN)

8 October 1995
18:00

Boxscore

Ukraine	93–60	Romania
Scoring by half: 46–27, 47–33
Pts: Iailo 18; Rebs: Molchanov 8 Asts: Iailo 6		Pts: Dobă 15; Rebs: Țenter 7 Asts: Păun, Țenter 3

Arena of BC Kyiv, Kyiv
Referees: Stylianos Koukoulekidis (GRE), József Harsányi (HUN)

8 October 1995
18:00

Boxscore

Croatia	69–53	Turkey
Scoring by half: 24–25, 45–28
Pts: S. Vranković, Mulaomerović 18; Rebs: S. Vranković 11; Asts: S. Vranković, Marcelić 2		Pts: Ene 15; Rebs: Büyükaycan 5 Asts: Erdenay, Büyükaycan 1

Dvorana G.O.C., Čakovec
Attendance: 1,800
Referees: Peter Poiger (AUT), Viliam Koller (SVK)

11 October 1995
18:00

Boxscore

Romania	69–84	Bulgaria
Scoring by half: 51–38, 37–41
Pts: Dobă 16; Rebs: Ştefan 12; Asts: Țenter 3		Pts: Mladenov 18; Rebs: Amiorkov 8 Asts: Mladenov 6

Bucharest
Referees: Virginijus Dovidavičius (LTU), Nikolaos Zavlanos (GRE)

11 October 1995
18:00

Boxscore

Croatia	73–53	Netherlands
Scoring by half: 33–25, 40–28
Pts: Kelečević 18; Rebs: S. Vranković 11; Asts: J. Vranković 3		Pts: Lieverst 14; Rebs: Lieverst 8 Asts: Krieger 3

Dvorana G.O.C., Čakovec
Attendance: 1,500
Referees: Tiziano Zancanella (ITA), Zsolt Hartyáni (HUN)

11 October 1995
18:00

Boxscore

Turkey	96–89 (OT)	Ukraine
Scoring by half: 39–37, 38–40 Overtime: 19–12
Pts: Kutluay 35; Rebs: Büyükaycan 7 Asts: Erdenay, Evliyaoğlu, Sarıca 2		Pts: Murzin 23; Rebs: Lokhmanchuk 7 Asts: Pudzyrey, Iailo 4

Arena of Türk Telekom SC, Ankara
Attendance: 4,500
Referees: Giampaolo Cicoria (ITA), Alojz Ceizel (SVK)

12 November 1995
15:00

Boxscore

Netherlands	71–88	Ukraine
Scoring by half: 36–48, 35–40
Pts: Huijbens 22; Rebs: Huijbens 4 Asts: Lieverst 4		Pts: Lokhmanchuk 34; Rebs: Lokhmanchuk 12; Asts: Murzin 3

Sporthallen Zuid, Amsterdam
Referees: Juan Carlos Mitjana (ESP), José Araújo (POR)

12 November 1995
16:00

Boxscore

Bulgaria	79–77	Croatia
Scoring by half: 35–48, 44–29
Pts: Mladenov 27; Rebs: Dimitrov 5 Asts: Mladenov 4		Pts: S. Vranković 24; Rebs: S. Vranković 12; Asts: Perasović 2

Arena of Spartak, Pleven
Attendance: 1,500
Referees: József Harsányi (HUN), Reuven Virovnik (ISR)

12 November 1995
18:00

Boxscore

Turkey	83–56	Romania
Scoring by half: 39–25, 44–31
Pts: Kutluay 22; Rebs: Türkcan 13; Asts: Ene 6		Pts: Ardelean 23; Rebs: Ştefan 7 Asts: Țenter 2

Arena of Türk Telekom SC, Ankara
Attendance: 4,500
Referees: Jugoslav Dikovski (MKD), David Dagan (ISR)

15 November 1995
18:00

Boxscore

Turkey	90–66	Bulgaria
Scoring by half: 46–29, 44–37
Pts: Kutluay 29; Rebs: Oyguç 8 Asts: Ene 10		Pts: Dimitrov, Antov 20; Rebs: Antov 7 Asts: Mladenov 8

Arena of Türk Telekom SC, Ankara
Attendance: 4,500
Referees: Peter Klingbiel (GER), Alessandro Teofili (ITA)

15 November 1995
18:00

Boxscore

Netherlands	99–77	Romania
Scoring by half: 54–41, 45–36
Pts: Huijbens 27; Rebs: Derks 9 Asts: Van Rootselaar 8		Pts: Ardelean 20; Rebs: Ştefan 8 Asts: Ştefan 2

Evenementenhal, Groningen
Referees: Pascal Dorizon (FRA), Richard Stokes (ENG)

15 November 1995
19:00

Boxscore

Ukraine	67–60	Croatia
Scoring by half: 34–30, 33–30
Pts: Lokhmanchuk 22; Rebs: Lokhmanchuk 7 Asts: Murzin 2		Pts: S. Vranković 21; Rebs: S. Vranković 11; Asts: S. Vranković 3

Arena of BC Kyiv, Kyiv
Attendance: 4,000
Referees: Carl Jungebrand (FIBA), Zbigniew Szpilewski (POL)

28 February 1996
18:00

Boxscore

Bulgaria	85–96	Ukraine
Scoring by half: 45–43, 40–53
Pts: Mladenov 25; Rebs: Dimitrov 5 Asts: Mladenov 4		Pts: Murzin 28; Rebs: Lokhmanchuk 9 Asts: Kharchenko 2

Arena of Spartak, Pleven
Attendance: 1,500
Referees: Iztok Rems (SLO), Ivan Zachara (CZE)

28 February 1996
20:15

Boxscore

Croatia	115–55	Romania
Scoring by half: 66–36, 49–19
Pts: Komazec 36; Rebs: S. Vranković 9 Asts: Komazec 7		Pts: Ardelean 21; Rebs: Scobai, Ardelean 3 Asts: Alecu 6

Dražen Petrović Basketball Hall, Zagreb
Attendance: 3,500
Referees: Marcello Reatto (ITA), Andreas Roth (AUT)

28 February 1996
20:30

Boxscore

Turkey	68–54	Netherlands
Scoring by half: 37–34, 31–20
Pts: Ene 19; Rebs: Türkcan 8 Asts: Ene 4		Pts: Van der Sluis 17; Rebs: Huijbens 8 Asts: Duijvelshoff 3

Arena of Türk Telekom SC, Ankara
Attendance: 4,500
Referees: Ido Bergman (ISR), Viliam Koller (SVK)

30 October 1996
18:00

Boxscore

Romania	57–73	Ukraine
Scoring by half: 25–43, 32–30
Pts: Popescu 20; Rebs: Popescu 12; Asts: Helcioiu 4		Pts: Iailo, Okunskyy 14; Rebs: Molchanov 5 Asts: Molchanov, Savchenko 5

Focșani
Attendance: 1,000
Referees: Stavros Tsanidis (GRE), Jugoslav Dikovski (MKD)

30 October 1996
18:00

Boxscore

Turkey	68–64	Croatia
Scoring by half: 31–29, 37–35
Pts: Ene 15; Rebs: Türkcan 6 Asts: Ene, Evliyaoğlu 3		Pts: Marcelić 13; Rebs: Kovačić 12; Asts: Mulaomerović 6

Arena of Türk Telekom SC, Ankara
Attendance: 4,500
Referees: Virginijus Dovidavičius (LTU), Vicente Sanchís (ESP)

31 October 1996
20:00

Boxscore

Netherlands	103–81	Bulgaria
Scoring by half: 47–41, 56–40
Pts: Nahar 26; Rebs: Huijbens, Nahar 8 Asts: Krieger 7		Pts: Mladenov 26; Rebs: Kostourkov, Glouchkov 5 Asts: Dimitrov, Stoyanov 3

Maaspoort, Den Bosch
Referees: Serge De Coster (BEL), Viliam Koller (SVK)

27 November 1996
17:00

Boxscore

Bulgaria	100–76	Romania
Scoring by half: 50–32, 50–44
Pts: Mladenov 27; Rebs: Natov 9 Asts: Mladenov 8		Pts: Căruţaşu 24; Rebs: Popescu 7 Asts: Helcioiu 4

Arena of Spartak, Pleven
Attendance: 1,500
Referees: Tomislav Jovančić (SRB), Marjan Stojovski (MKD)

27 November 1996
18:00

Boxscore

Ukraine	85–74	Turkey
Scoring by half: 41–32, 44–42
Pts: Lokhmanchuk 22; Rebs: Okunskyy 9 Asts: Murzin, Lokhmanchuk 6		Pts: Türkcan 19; Rebs: Türkcan 12; Asts: Türkcan, Ene, Erdenay, Sarıca 1

Reykjavík
Attendance: 4,000
Referees: Iztok Rems (SLO), György Váradi (HUN)

27 November 1996
19:30

Boxscore

Netherlands	72–76	Croatia
Scoring by half: 27–41, 45–35
Pts: Hammink 22; Rebs: Hammink 10; Asts: Duijvelshoff 4		Pts: Alanović 17; Rebs: Kelečević, Mulaomerović, Kovačić 6 Asts: Mulaomerović 9

Maaspoort, Den Bosch
Attendance: 2,800
Referees: Bruno Gasperin (FRA), Víctor Mas (ESP)

18 December 1996
18:00

Boxscore

Romania	58–73	Turkey
Scoring by half: 35–37, 23–36
Pts: Căruţaşu 19; Rebs: Căruţaşu, Popescu 7 Asts: Helcioiu 7		Pts: Kutluay 23; Rebs: Türkcan 7 Asts: Erdenay 3

Attendance: 1,000
Referees: Jozef Jančovič (SVK), Gábor Missura (HUN)

18 December 1996
18:00

Boxscore

Ukraine	98–57	Netherlands
Scoring by half: 40–25, 58–32
Pts: Iailo 21; Rebs: Iailo, Rubchenko 9 Asts: Okunskyy 3		Pts: Huijbens, Hammink 17; Rebs: Hammink 9 Asts: Van der Sluis 3

Arena of BC Kyiv, Kyiv
Attendance: 4,500
Referees: Peter Klingbiel (GER), Zbigniew Szpilewski (POL)

18 December 1996
20:00

Boxscore

Croatia	96–69	Bulgaria
Scoring by half: 51–34, 45–35
Pts: Rimac 17; Rebs: Kovačić 14; Asts: Mulaomerović 10		Pts: Mladenov 20; Rebs: Natov 7 Asts: Mladenov 12

Športska dvorana Gospino polje, Dubrovnik
Attendance: 2,000
Referees: Pierluigi D'Este (ITA), György Váradi (HUN)

29 January 1997
17:00

Boxscore

Bulgaria	67–54	Turkey
Scoring by half: 37–32, 30–22
Pts: Dimitrov 22; Rebs: Natov 7 Asts: Mladenov 6		Pts: Oyguç 20; Rebs: Oyguç 7 Asts: Evliyaoğlu, Yıldırım, Sarıca 1

Arena of Spartak, Pleven
Attendance: 1,500
Referees: Petr Sudek (SVK), Sergey Bulanov (RUS)

29 January 1997
18:00

Boxscore

Romania	56–68	Netherlands
Scoring by half: 26–37, 30–31
Pts: Helcioiu 19; Rebs: Popescu 8 Asts: Helcioiu 4		Pts: Huijbens 15; Rebs: Hammink 12; Asts: Hammink 7

Arad
Attendance: 2,000
Referees: Todd Warnick (ISR), Marjan Stojovski (MKD)

29 January 1997
20:00

Boxscore

Croatia	85–66	Ukraine
Scoring by half: 43–34, 42–32
Pts: Mulaomerović 27; Rebs: Nicević, Kelečević 6 Asts: Alanović 8		Pts: Murzin 15; Rebs: Okunskyy 5 Asts: Murzin 5

Dvorana Mladosti, Rijeka
Attendance: 3,000
Referees: Armand De Keyser (BEL), Andreas Roth (AUT)

26 February 1997
18:00

Boxscore

Ukraine	79–60	Bulgaria
Scoring by half: 41–35, 38–25
Pts: Iailo 18; Rebs: Okunskyy 9 Asts: Murzin 4		Pts: Mladenov 15; Rebs: Kostourkov 7 Asts: Mladenov 2

Arena of BC Kyiv, Kyiv
Attendance: 4,500
Referees: Zdeněk Šantrůček (CZE), Jugoslav Dikovski (MKD)

26 February 1997
18:00

Boxscore

Romania	65–108	Croatia
Scoring by half: 33–52, 32–56
Pts: Stănescu 15; Rebs: Boian, Toader, Stănescu, Lăpuşte 4 Asts: Toader, Lăpuşte 3		Pts: Rimac 24; Rebs: Kelečević 14; Asts: Sesar 7

Cluj
Attendance: 4,000
Referees: Dashamir Bardhi (ALB), Nikolaos Zavlanos (GRE)

26 February 1997
20:00

Boxscore

Netherlands	63–73	Turkey
Scoring by half: 23–38, 40–35
Pts: Nahar 14; Rebs: Hammink 7 Asts: Hammink 8		Pts: Türkcan 19; Rebs: Türkcan 11; Asts: Türkcan, Ene, Evliyaoğlu, Beşok 1

Maaspoort, Den Bosch
Attendance: 3,000
Referees: Pascal Dorizon (FRA), Richard Stokes (ENG)

=== Group E ===
Team	Pld	W	L	PF	PA	PD	Pts	Tie
France	10	10	0	813	644	+169	20	
Lithuania	10	6	4	896	786	+110	16	
Poland	10	5	5	837	807	+30	15	
Sweden	10	4	6	725	778	−53	14	2–0
Belgium	10	4	6	770	774	−4	14	0–2
Switzerland	10	1	9	651	903	−252	11	

8 October 1995
16:00

Boxscore

Belgium	100–62	Switzerland
Scoring by half: 55–22, 45–40
Pts: Struelens 19; Rebs: Goethals 10; Asts: Robinson 3		Pts: Mrazek 13; Rebs: Grimes 7 Asts: Koller 1

Salle Edgard Hismans, Quaregnon
Attendance: 1,800
Referees: Michel Zegwaard (NED), Alan Richardson (ENG)

8 October 1995
17:00

Boxscore

Sweden	64–62	Poland
Scoring by half: 26–34, 38–28
Pts: Sahlström 19; Rebs: Blom, Markus, Sahlström 8 Asts: Sahlström 3		Pts: Tomczyk 20; Rebs: Jankowski 9 Asts: Kabala 2

Arena of Scania, Södertälje
Attendance: 1,100
Referees: Jan Gjettermann (DEN), Mikhail Davydov (RUS)

8 October 1995
17:30

Boxscore

Lithuania	74–87	France
Scoring by half: 45–39, 29–48
Pts: Karnišovas 26; Rebs: Karnišovas, Einikis 6 Asts: Lukminas 2		Pts: Bonato 22; Rebs: Bonato 5 Asts: Rigaudeau 3

Vilnius Palace of Concerts and Sports, Vilnius
Attendance: 3,800
Referees: Carl Jungebrand (FIBA), Petr Sudek (SVK)

10 October 1995
20:00

Boxscore

France	74–73	Belgium
Scoring by half: 34–35, 40–38
Pts: Bonato 15; Rebs: Gadou 6 Asts: Bonato 5		Pts: Struelens 17; Rebs: Struelens 11; Asts: Jaumin 4

Tourcoing
Attendance: 2,800
Referees: Miguel Betancor (ESP), Fernand Hengel (LUX)

11 October 1995
17:30

Boxscore

Switzerland	63–57	Sweden
Scoring by half: 27–27, 36–30
Pts: Koller 16; Rebs: Grimes 9 Asts: Mazzi 1		Pts: Sahlström 24; Rebs: Sahlström 12; Asts: Sahlström 2

Arti et Mesteri, Bellinzona
Referees: Efim Resser (GER), Santiago Fernández (ESP)

11 October 1995
20:30

Boxscore

Lithuania	108–96	Poland
Scoring by half: 51–47, 57–49
Pts: Einikis 27; Rebs: Einikis 12; Asts: Lukminas, Karnišovas 4		Pts: Tomczyk 22; Rebs: Jankowski 7 Asts: Wójcik 5

Vilnius Palace of Concerts and Sports, Vilnius
Attendance: 3,500
Referees: Peter Klingbiel (GER), Zdenek Šantrůček (CZE)

12 November 1995
14:00

Boxscore

Switzerland	48–87	France
Scoring by half: 21–33, 27–54
Pts: Valis 10; Rebs: Valis 10; Asts: Maggi 1		Pts: Bonato 21; Rebs: Butter, Bilba 6 Asts: Sciarra, Bilba 2

Sporthalle St. Jakob, Basel
Attendance: 1,840
Referees: Tsanidis (GRE), Andrej Jelen (SLO)

12 November 1995
17:00

Boxscore

Sweden	83–85	Lithuania
Scoring by half: 37–50, 46–35
Pts: Gehrke 26; Rebs: Gehrke, Sahlström 6 Asts: Håkanson 8		Pts: Lukminas, Einikis 21; Rebs: Einikis 8 Asts: Lukminas 4

Arena of Magic M7, Borås
Referees: William Jones (WAL), Iztok Rems (SLO)

12 November 1995
17:30

Boxscore

Poland	84–85 (OT)	Belgium
Scoring by half: 45–32, 31–44 Overtime: 8–9
Pts: Wójcik 23; Rebs: Wójcik 12; Asts: Kabala 6		Pts: Deheneffe 20; Rebs: Goethals 9 Asts: R. Bayer, Herman, Deheneffe, Stas 1

Attendance: 1,500
Referees: Danko Radić (CRO), György Váradi (HUN)

14 November 1995
20:00

Boxscore

France	85–56	Sweden
Scoring by half: 41–28, 44–28
Pts: Bonato 25; Rebs: Bilba 9 Asts: Sciarra 6		Pts: P. Larsson, Gehrke 12; Rebs: Markus 6 Asts: Gehrke 4

Arena of SAOS JDA Dijon, Dijon
Attendance: 4,628
Referees: António Coelho (POR), Viliam Koller (SVK)

15 November 1995
17:30

Boxscore

Poland	81–68	Switzerland
Scoring by half: 38–32, 43–36
Pts: Jankowski 24; Rebs: Wójcik, Jankowski 6 Asts: Tomczyk 4		Pts: Valis 18; Rebs: Valis 10; Asts: Mrazek 5

Poznań
Attendance: 1,300
Referees: Petr Sudek (SVK), Aliaksandr Yarotski (BLR)

15 November 1995
20:00

Boxscore

Belgium	85–83	Lithuania
Scoring by half: 37–42, 48–41
Pts: Stas 18; Rebs: Struelens 6 Asts: Struelens 4		Pts: Lukminas, Einikis 25; Rebs: Einikis 12; Asts: Kurtinaitis 2

Arena of BBC Okapi Maes, Aalst
Attendance: 1,000
Referees: Michael Trumpke (GER), Vicente Sanchís (ESP)

28 February 1996
19:00

Boxscore

Sweden	66–56	Belgium
Scoring by half: 40–26, 26–30
Pts: Gehrke, Markus 15; Rebs: Sahlström 11; Asts: Håkanson, Stümer 3		Pts: Struelens 20; Rebs: Struelens, Robinson 10; Asts: Dupont 1

Arena of Nerike Basket, Örebro
Attendance: 1,000
Referees: Kristinn Albertsson (ISL), Efim Resser (GER)

28 February 1996
19:00

Boxscore

Lithuania	109–71	Switzerland
Scoring by half: 61–29, 48–42
Pts: Karnišovas 32; Rebs: Einikis 13; Asts: Lukminas 5		Pts: Mrazek 25; Rebs: Valis 14; Asts: Felli, Mrazek 2

Vilnius Palace of Concerts and Sports, Vilnius
Attendance: 3,500
Referees: Ion Olaru (ROU), Grzegorz Ziemblicki (POL)

28 February 1996
20:00

Boxscore

France	73–66	Poland
Scoring by half: 31–33, 42–33
Pts: Bonato 17; Rebs: Gadou 11; Asts: Bilba 5		Pts: Bacik 19; Rebs: Bacik 8 Asts: Tomczyk 3

Grenoble
Attendance: 9,000
Referees: António Pimentel (POR), Roger Schwarz (GER)

30 October 1996
18:00

Boxscore

Poland	100–86	Sweden
Scoring by half: 49–44, 51–42
Pts: Pluta 26; Rebs: Tomczyk, Jankowski 7 Asts: Pluta, Tomczyk 6		Pts: P. Larsson 31; Rebs: Markus 6 Asts: P. Larsson, Aulander 2

Arena of KS Górnik, Wałbrzych
Attendance: 1,500
Referees: Karel Bruna (CZE), Andreas Roth (AUT)

30 October 1996
20:00

Boxscore

France	75–67	Lithuania
Scoring by half: 40–38, 35–29
Pts: Gadou 16; Rebs: Bilba 10; Asts: Rigaudeau 7		Pts: Karnišovas 23; Rebs: Einikis 8 Asts: Lukminas, Karnišovas 5

Palais des Sports Jean Weille, Nancy
Attendance: 4,300
Referees: Stefano Cazzaro (ITA), Konstantinos Koromilas (GRE)

30 October 1996
20:15

Boxscore

Switzerland	73–101	Belgium
Scoring by half: 28–55, 45–46
Pts: Koller 16; Rebs: Valis 4 Asts: Koller 3		Pts: Struelens, Cleymans 18; Rebs: Struelens 7 Asts: Jaumin 11

Salle Sainte-Croix, Fribourg
Referees: Giampaolo Cicoria (ITA), Milivoje Jovčić (SRB)

27 November 1996
18:00

Boxscore

Poland	88–69	Lithuania
Scoring by half: 43–38, 45–31
Pts: Zieliński 19; Rebs: Jankowski 9 Asts: Pluta, Tomczyk 3		Pts: Kurtinaitis 23; Rebs: Einikis 11; Asts: Lukminas, Maskoliūnas 2

Białystok
Attendance: 2,000
Referees: Andrej Lovšin (SLO), Alojz Ceizel (SVK)

27 November 1996
19:00

Boxscore

Sweden	76–63	Switzerland
Scoring by half: 37–33, 39–30
Pts: Sahlström 24; Rebs: Sahlström 9 Asts: Håkanson 6		Pts: Valis 22; Rebs: Valis 11; Asts: Valis 5

Helsingborg
Attendance: 1,700
Referees: Jörgen Willum Travis (DEN), Jan Harald Korshavn (NOR)

27 November 1996
20:00

Boxscore

Belgium	55–89	France
Scoring by half: 16–44, 39–45
Pts: Jaumin 11; Rebs: Marion 6 Asts: Jaumin 2		Pts: Foirest 16; Rebs: Julian 6 Asts: Sciarra, Bonato, Pluvy 2

Charleroi
Attendance: 3,500
Referees: Jan Herweijer (NED), Viliam Koller (SVK)

18 December 1996
18:30

Boxscore

Lithuania	108–87	Sweden
Scoring by half: 55–37, 53–50
Pts: Lukminas 25; Rebs: Einikis 13; Asts: Lukminas 5		Pts: Stümer 25; Rebs: Stümer 9 Asts: Stümer 7

Vilnius Palace of Concerts and Sports, Vilnius
Attendance: 4,000
Referees: Pavel Volejník (CZE), József Harsányi (HUN)

18 December 1996
20:00

Boxscore

France	76–61	Switzerland
Scoring by half: 38–28, 38–33
Pts: Gadou 14; Rebs: Weis 12; Asts: Foirest 4		Pts: Fernandez 12; Rebs: Valis, Maly 6 Asts: Mrazek 7

Arena of Basket Comte, Besançon
Attendance: 4,200
Referees: Keith Bruce (ENG), Xavier Amoros (ESP)

18 December 1996
20:00

Boxscore

Belgium	85–89	Poland
Scoring by half: 39–41, 46–48
Pts: Struelens 28; Rebs: Struelens, Robinson 6 Asts: Jaumin, R. Bayer 2		Pts: Pluta 26; Rebs: Jankowski 7 Asts: Kósciuk, Pluta 1

Namur
Attendance: 1,300
Referees: William Jones (WAL), Roger Schwarz (GER)

29 January 1997
18:30

Boxscore

Lithuania	75–52	Belgium
Scoring by half: 44–22, 31–30
Pts: Štombergas 19; Rebs: Štombergas 12; Asts: Pačėsas, Karnišovas 5		Pts: Struelens 12; Rebs: Robinson 15; Asts: Jaumin 4

Vilnius Palace of Concerts and Sports, Vilnius
Attendance: 4,500
Referees: Carl Jungebrand (FIBA), Ladislav Janáč (SVK)

29 January 1997
19:00

Boxscore

Sweden	71–78	France
Scoring by half: 30–38, 41–40
Pts: Stümer 21; Rebs: Gehrke 9 Asts: Håkanson 7		Pts: Bonato 22; Rebs: Gadou 6 Asts: Foirest 4

Luleå Energi Arena, Luleå
Attendance: 2,296
Referees: Jan Gjettermann (DEN), Mikhail Davydov (RUS)

29 January 1997
20:15

Boxscore

Switzerland	80–98	Poland
Scoring by half: 39–52, 41–46
Pts: Mrazek 21; Rebs: Maly 6 Asts: Koller 3		Pts: Zieliński 19; Rebs: Jankowski 6 Asts: Zieliński, Wójcik 2

Pavillon des Sports du Bout-du-Monde, Geneva
Referees: Erich Kratschmer (AUT), Guerrino Cerebuch (ITA)

26 February 1997
18:00

Boxscore

Poland	73–89	France
Scoring by half: 32–45, 41–44
Pts: Pluta 18; Rebs: Wójcik, Dryja 4 Asts: Zieliński 6		Pts: Bonato 28; Rebs: Digbeu 9 Asts: Sciarra 6

Arena of KS Górnik, Wałbrzych
Attendance: 1,700
Referees: Efim Resser (GER), Mika Moberg (FIN)

26 February 1997
20:00

Boxscore

Belgium	78–79	Sweden
Scoring by half: 42–36, 36–43
Pts: Struelens 24; Rebs: Struelens 15; Asts: P. Bayer 2		Pts: P. Larsson 22; Rebs: Sahlström 7 Asts: Håkanson, P. Larsson, Gehrke 1

Kuipke, Oostende
Attendance: 1,500
Referees: José Araújo (POR), Trevor Pountain (GBR)

26 February 1997
20:15

Boxscore

Switzerland	62–118	Lithuania
Scoring by half: 30–56, 32–62
Pts: Grimes 20; Rebs: Grimes, Valis 6 Asts: Koller 8		Pts: Karnišovas 32; Rebs: Žukauskas 8 Asts: Vaišvila 7

Arena of Union Neuchâtel, Neuchâtel
Referees: Andrej Jelen (SLO), Tomislav Kovačić (SLO)
