= EuroBasket 1993 =

International basketball event

Basketball-Europameisterschaft 1993

Tournament details
- Host country: Germany
- Dates: 22 June – 4 July
- Teams: 16
- Venues: 3 (in 3 host cities)

Final positions
- Champions: Germany (1st title)
- Runners-up: Russia
- Third place: Croatia
- Fourth place: Greece

Tournament statistics
- MVP: (Germany) Chris Welp
- Top scorer: (Bosnia and Herzegovina) Sabahudin Bilalović (24.1 points per game)

The 1993 FIBA European Championship, commonly called FIBA EuroBasket 1993, was the 28th FIBA EuroBasket regional basketball championship, held by FIBA Europe. It was held in Germany between 22 June and 4 July 1993. Sixteen national teams entered the event under the auspices of FIBA Europe, the sport's regional governing body. The cities of Berlin, Karlsruhe and Munich hosted the tournament. Hosts Germany won their first FIBA European title by defeating Russia with a 71–70 score in the final. Germany's Chris Welp was voted the tournament's MVP. This edition of the FIBA EuroBasket tournament also served as qualification for the 1994 FIBA World Championship, giving a berth to the top five teams in the final standings.

== Qualification ==
Competition	Date	Vacancies	Qualified
Qualified from EuroBasket 1991	24 – 29 June 1991	3	France; Italy; Spain
Qualified through Qualifying Round	1 May 1991 – 18 November 1992	8	Belgium; Bulgaria; Germany; Greece; Israel; Russia; Sweden; Turkey
Qualified through Additional Qualifying Round	30 May – 7 June 1993	5	Bosnia and Herzegovina; Croatia; Estonia; Latvia; Slovenia

== Venues ==
Location	Picture	City	Arena	Capacity	Status	Round
EuroBasket 1993 is located in Germany		Berlin	Deutschlandhalle	8,500	Opened in 1935	Groups B, D and F
EuroBasket 1993 is located in Germany		Karlsruhe	Europahalle	5,000	Opened in 1983	Groups A, C and E
EuroBasket 1993 is located in Germany		München	Olympiahalle	10,800	Opened in 1972	Knockout and qualification rounds

== Teams ==
The tournament was originally planned for 12 teams. However, after the qualifying round was concluded, FIBA Europe decided to expand it to 16 teams. The main reason for this decision were political changes in Eastern Europe - both the Soviet Union and Yugoslavia had disintegrated. Teams from these two countries had completely dominated competitions in European basketball up to that point. Yugoslavia was the title holder but was banned from all international sport competitions as a result of sanctions against Federal Republic of Yugoslavia. Russia was announced as the successor to the Soviet Union team and competed as an independent country at a major tournament for the first time. Since teams from new sovereign nations, including 1992 Olympics silver medalist Croatia and bronze medalist Lithuania did not have the opportunity to compete in the qualifying round, FIBA Europe organized an additional qualifying tournament in order to provide some of these teams a chance to participate at the championship. The additional tournament was held in Wrocław, Poland a month before Eurobasket.

== Format ==
- Teams competed in groups of four. The top three teams from each group advanced to the second round.
- The 12 teams that qualified to the second round were divided in two groups of six teams each, with one group containing the best three teams from groups A and B, while the other containing the three best teams from groups C and D. Results from the previous round were carried over, but only those against teams which had qualified for the second round.
- After the second round, the four best teams from each group advanced to the knockout stage of the tournament.
- Teams eliminated in the quarterfinals competed in a consolation bracket for places 5th through 8th in the final standings.

== Preliminary round ==
Qualified for the second round

=== Group A ===
Times given below are in Central European Summer Time (UTC+2).

Team	Pld	W	L	PF	PA	PD	Pts	Tie
Spain	3	3	0	254	213	+41	6	
Russia	3	1	2	266	263	+3	4	1-1, +14
Bosnia and Herzegovina	3	1	2	255	264	−9	4	1-1, -2
Sweden	3	1	2	218	253	−35	4	1-1, -12

22 June
14:00

Boxscore

Russia	99–77	Bosnia and Herzegovina
Scoring by half: 49–27, 50–50
Pts: Bazarevich 17		Pts: Primorac 24

Europahalle, Karlsruhe
Attendance: 2,000
Referees: Anguel Ivanov (BUL), Armand de Keyser (BEL)

22 June
16:00

Boxscore

Spain	72–49	Sweden
Scoring by half: 36–25, 36–24
Pts: Villacampa 17		Pts: Sahlström 20

Europahalle, Karlsruhe
Attendance: 2,000
Referees: Iztok Rems (SLO), Peter George (GER)

23 June
14:00

Boxscore

Sweden	100–92 (OT)	Russia
Scoring by half: 51–43, 32–40 Overtime: 17–9
Pts: Gehrke 24		Pts: Sukharev 19

Europahalle, Karlsruhe
Attendance: 2,000
Referees: Danko Radic (CRO), Fatih Dalay (TUR)

23 June
16:00

Boxscore

Spain	96–89	Bosnia and Herzegovina
Scoring by half: 46–41, 50–48
Pts: Villacampa 28		Pts: Avdić, Bilalović, Primorac 20

Europahalle, Karlsruhe
Attendance: 2,000
Referees: Wieslaw Zych (POL), Pascal Dorizon (FRA)

24 June
14:00

Boxscore

Bosnia and Herzegovina	89–69	Sweden
Scoring by half: 45–36, 44–33
Pts: Primorac 27		Pts: Sahlström 28

Europahalle, Karlsruhe
Attendance: 2,500
Referees: Anguel Ivanov (BUL), Atso Matsalu (EST)

24 June
16:00

Boxscore

Spain	86–75	Russia
Scoring by half: 38–38, 48–37
Pts: Martín Espina, Villacampa 21		Pts: Babkov 24

Europahalle, Karlsruhe
Attendance: 2,000
Referees: Iztok Rems (SLO), Pascal Dorizon (FRA)

=== Group B ===
Team	Pld	W	L	PF	PA	PD	Pts
Croatia	3	3	0	317	241	+76	6
France	3	2	1	255	229	+26	5
Turkey	3	1	2	196	252	−56	4
Bulgaria	3	0	3	227	273	−46	3

22 June
13:30

Boxscore

Bulgaria	83–104	Croatia
Scoring by half: 39–50, 44–54
Pts: Mladenov 30		Pts: Perasović 23

Deutschlandhalle, Berlin
Referees: Mariss Bernats (LAT), Miguel Betancor (ESP)

22 June
15:30

Boxscore

France	69–55	Turkey
Scoring by half: 34–24, 35–31
Pts: Allinéi 12		Pts: Büyükaycan 19

Deutschlandhalle, Berlin
Attendance: 1,300
Referees: Roger Ekström (SWE), Reuven Virovnik (ISR)

23 June
13:30

Boxscore

France	95–100 (OT)	Croatia
Scoring by half: 42–41, 43–44 Overtime: 10–15
Pts: Ostrowski 19		Pts: Cvjetićanin 26

Deutschlandhalle, Berlin
Attendance: 1,500
Referees: Mariss Bernats (LAT), Nikolaos Pitsilkas (GRE)

23 June
15:30

Boxscore

Turkey	78–70	Bulgaria
Scoring by half: 29–35, 49–35
Pts: Erdenay 19		Pts: Mladenov 16

Deutschlandhalle, Berlin
Attendance: 2,000
Referees: Michail Grigoriev (RUS), Paolo Zanon (ITA)

24 June
13:30

Boxscore

France	91–74	Bulgaria
Scoring by half: 42–28, 49–46
Pts: Adams 21		Pts: Mladenov 18

Deutschlandhalle, Berlin
Referees: Tihomir Bubalo (SRB), Goran Radonjic (FRA)

24 June
15:30

Boxscore

Croatia	113–63	Turkey
Scoring by half: 56–26, 57–37
Pts: Rađa, Gregov 21		Pts: Saybir 19

Deutschlandhalle, Berlin
Attendance: 1,500
Referees: Roger Ekström (SWE), Michail Grigoriev (RUS)

=== Group C ===
Team	Pld	W	L	PF	PA	PD	Pts	Tie
Greece	3	2	1	243	214	+29	5	1-0, +19
Latvia	3	2	1	243	244	−1	5	0-1, -19
Italy	3	1	2	244	251	−7	4	1-0, +9
Israel	3	1	2	246	267	−21	4	0-1, -9

22 June
15:00

Boxscore

Greece	81–62	Latvia
Scoring by half: 45–40, 36–22
Pts: Christodoulou, Giannakis 17		Pts: Muižnieks 21

Europahalle, Karlsruhe
Attendance: 1,500
Referees: Pascal Dorizon (FRA), Danko Radic (CRO)

22 June
21:00

Boxscore

Italy	92–83	Israel
Scoring by half: 40–23, 52–60
Pts: Rusconi 22		Pts: Jamchi 19

Europahalle, Karlsruhe
Referees: Wieslaw Zych (POL), Carl Jungenbrand (FIN)

23 June
19:00

Boxscore

Israel	79–74	Greece
Scoring by half: 40–41, 39–33
Pts: Gordon 35		Pts: Giannakis 32

Europahalle, Karlsruhe
Attendance: 2,500
Referees: Iztok Rems (SLO), Peter George (GER)

23 June
21:00

Boxscore

Italy	79–80	Latvia
Scoring by half: 47–38, 32–42
Pts: Rusconi 18		Pts: Muižnieks 22

Europahalle, Karlsruhe
Referees: Anguel Ivanov (BUL), Armand de Keyser (BEL)

24 June
19:00

Boxscore

Latvia	101–84	Israel
Scoring by half: 50–35, 51–49
Pts: Jaunzems 21		Pts: Henefeld 16

Europahalle, Karlsruhe
Attendance: 3,500
Referees: Peter George (GER), Carl Jungenbrand (FIN)

24 June
21:00

Boxscore

Italy	73–88	Greece
Scoring by half: 33–35, 40–53
Pts: Rusconi 17		Pts: Giannakis 27

Europahalle, Karlsruhe
Attendance: 4,500
Referees: Wieslaw Zych (POL), Danko Radic (CRO)

=== Group D ===
Team	Pld	W	L	PF	PA	PD	Pts	Tie
Estonia	3	2	1	255	261	−6	5	1-0, +10
Germany	3	2	1	275	234	+41	5	0-1, -10
Belgium	3	1	2	224	233	−9	4	1-0, +21
Slovenia	3	1	2	198	224	−26	4	0-1, -21

22 June
19:00

Boxscore

Germany	103–113	Estonia
Scoring by half: 44–49, 59–64
Pts: Welp 23		Pts: Kuusmaa 30

Deutschlandhalle, Berlin
Attendance: 3,800
Referees: Goran Radonjic (FRA), Paolo Zanon (ITA)

22 June
21:00

Boxscore

Slovenia	61–82	Belgium
Scoring by half: 31–35, 30–47
Pts: Alibegović 22		Pts: Bayer 25

Deutschlandhalle, Berlin
Attendance: 2,000
Referees: Michail Grigoriev (RUS), Nikolaos Pitsilkas (GRE)

23 June
19:00

Boxscore

Belgium	64–93	Germany
Scoring by half: 35–56, 29–37
Pts: Struelens 15		Pts: Harnisch 18

Deutschlandhalle, Berlin
Attendance: 3,100
Referees: Tihomir Bubalo (SRB), Reuven Virovnik (ISR)

23 June
21:00

Boxscore

Slovenia	80–63	Estonia
Scoring by half: 37–28, 43–35
Pts: Alibegović 16		Pts: Pehka 18

Deutschlandhalle, Berlin
Attendance: 2,000
Referees: Miguel Betancor (ESP), Roger Ekström (SWE)

24 June
19:00

Boxscore

Slovenia	57–79	Germany
Scoring by half: 32–31, 25–48
Pts: Kotnik 21		Pts: Harnisch, Jackel 19

Deutschlandhalle, Berlin
Attendance: 5,000
Referees: Miguel Betancor (ESP), Reuven Virovnik (ISR)

24 June
21:00

Boxscore

Estonia	79–78	Belgium
Scoring by half: 36–36, 43–42
Pts: Kuusmaa 22		Pts: Bayer 24

Deutschlandhalle, Berlin
Attendance: 3,000
Referees: Nikolaos Pitsilkas (GRE), Paolo Zanon (ITA)

== Second round ==
Advanced to the quarterfinals

=== Group E ===
Team	Pld	W	L	PF	PA	PD	Pts	Tie
Spain	5	4	1	430	387	+43	9	1-1, +10
Russia	5	4	1	444	371	+73	9	1-1, +6
Greece	5	4	1	414	378	+36	9	1-1, -16
Bosnia and Herzegovina	5	1	4	424	468	−44	6	1-1, +3
Italy	5	1	4	355	413	−58	6	1-1, +1
Latvia	5	1	4	398	448	−50	6	1-1, -4

26 June
16:00

Boxscore

Italy	60–78	Spain
Scoring by half: 37–40, 23–38
Pts: Myers 16		Pts: Martín Espina 18

Europahalle, Karlsruhe
Attendance: 1,000
Referees: Danko Radic (CRO), Carl Jungebrand (FIN)

26 June
19:00

Boxscore

Latvia	72–91	Russia
Scoring by half: 40–47, 32–44
Pts: Muižnieks 23		Pts: Fetisov 21

Europahalle, Karlsruhe
Attendance: 2,500
Referees: Wieslaw Zych (POL), Pascal Dorizon (FRA)

26 June
21:00

Boxscore

Greece	102–84	Bosnia and Herzegovina
Scoring by half: 56–49, 46–35
Pts: Galakteros 33		Pts: Primorac 28

Europahalle, Karlsruhe
Attendance: 5,000
Referees: Anguel Ivanov (BUL), Armand de Keyser (BEL)

27 June
16:00

Boxscore

Spain	95–87	Latvia
Scoring by half: 46–45, 49–42
Pts: Martín Espina 21		Pts: Muižnieks 34

Europahalle, Karlsruhe
Attendance: 1,000
Referees: Wieslaw Zych (POL), Atso Matsalu (EST)

27 June
19:00

Boxscore

Bosnia and Herzegovina	72–74	Italy
Scoring by half: 38–36, 34–38
Pts: Bilalović 22		Pts: Gentile 17

Europahalle, Karlsruhe
Attendance: 4,000
Referees: Carl Jungebrand (FIN), Pascal Dorizon (FRA)

27 June
21:00

Boxscore

Greece	67–84	Russia
Scoring by half: 38–42, 29–42
Pts: Galakteros 17		Pts: Bazarevich 36

Europahalle, Karlsruhe
Attendance: 5,000
Referees: Danko Radic (CRO), Peter George (GER)

28 June
16:00

Boxscore

Latvia	97–102	Bosnia and Herzegovina
Scoring by half: 48–47, 49–55
Pts: Muižnieks 29		Pts: Bilalović 36

Europahalle, Karlsruhe
Attendance: 1,000
Referees: Peter George (GER), Armand de Keyser (BEL)

28 June
19:00

Boxscore

Russia	95–69	Italy
Scoring by half: 44–48, 51–21
Pts: Bazarevich 24		Pts: Pittis 20

Europahalle, Karlsruhe
Attendance: 2,900
Referees: Wieslaw Zych (POL), Danko Radic (CRO)

28 June
21:00

Boxscore

Spain	75–76	Greece
Scoring by half: 37–36, 38–40
Pts: Villacampa 31		Pts: Giannakis 22

Europahalle, Karlsruhe
Attendance: 5,000
Referees: Anguel Ivanov (BUL), Carl Jungebrand (FIN)

=== Group F ===
Team	Pld	W	L	PF	PA	PD	Pts
Croatia	5	5	0	487	375	+112	10
France	5	4	1	384	337	+47	9
Estonia	5	3	2	410	426	−16	8
Germany	5	2	3	392	375	+17	7
Turkey	5	1	4	325	395	−70	6
Belgium	5	0	5	340	430	−90	5

26 June
15:00

Boxscore

France	64–56	Germany
Scoring by half: 35–30, 29–26
Pts: Bilba 13		Pts: Gnad 16

Deutschlandhalle, Berlin
Attendance: 5,000
Referees: Tihomir Bubalo (SRB), Paolo Zanon (ITA)

26 June
17:00

Boxscore

Estonia	77–74	Turkey
Scoring by half: 42–39, 35–35
Pts: Babenko 22		Pts: Topsakal 26

Deutschlandhalle, Berlin
Attendance: 3,500
Referees: Miguel Betancor (ESP), Reuven Virovnik (ISR)

26 June
19:00

Boxscore

Croatia	106–74	Belgium
Scoring by half: 54–34, 52–40
Pts: Rađa 27		Pts: Samaey 14

Deutschlandhalle, Berlin
Attendance: 3,000
Referees: Michail Grigoriev (RUS), Nikolaos Pitsilkas (GRE)

27 June
15:00

Boxscore

Estonia	62–73	France
Scoring by half: 23–44, 39–29
Pts: Noormets 15		Pts: Gadou, Ostrowski 12

Deutschlandhalle, Berlin
Attendance: 3,000
Referees: Goran Radonjic (FRA), Reuven Virovnik (ISR)

27 June
17:00

Boxscore

Croatia	70–63	Germany
Scoring by half: 38–31, 32–32
Pts: Rađa 22		Pts: Koch 16

Deutschlandhalle, Berlin
Attendance: 5,000
Referees: Miguel Betancor (ESP), Nikolaos Pitsilkas (GRE)

27 June
19:00

Boxscore

Turkey	69–59	Belgium
Scoring by half: 32–36, 37–23
Pts: Ene 18		Pts: Bayer 14

Deutschlandhalle, Berlin
Attendance: 3,500
Referees: Mariss Bernats (LAT), Paolo Zanon (ITA)

28 June
15:00

Boxscore

Croatia	98–80	Estonia
Scoring by half: 49–41, 49–39
Pts: Perasović 25		Pts: Kullamäe 20

Deutschlandhalle, Berlin
Referees: Miguel Betancor (ESP), Paolo Zanon (ITA)

28 June
17:00

Boxscore

France	83–65	Belgium
Scoring by half: 45–37, 38–28
Pts: Rigaudeau 20		Pts: Struelens 19

Deutschlandhalle, Berlin
Attendance: 1,000
Referees: Tihomir Bubalo (SRB), Michail Grigoriev (RUS)

28 June
19:00

Boxscore

Germany	77–64	Turkey
Scoring by half: 38–39, 39–25
Pts: Harnisch 16		Pts: Aydın 19

Deutschlandhalle, Berlin
Attendance: 4,200
Referees: Reuven Virovnik (ISR), Mariss Bernats (LAT)

== Knockout stage ==
=== Championship bracket ===
Quarter-finals
1 July – 17:30
Russia	82
Estonia	61
1 July – 21:00
Croatia	98
Bosnia and Herzegovina	78
1 July – 15:30
France	59
Greece	61
1 July – 19:00
Spain	77
Germany (OT)	79

Semi-finals
2 July – 19:00
Russia	84
Croatia	76
2 July – 21:00
Greece	73
Germany	76

Final
4 July – 21:00
Russia	70
Germany	71
Third place
3 July – 21:00
Croatia	99
Greece	59

==== Quarterfinals ====
1 July
15:30

Boxscore

France	59–61	Greece
Scoring by half: 39–33, 20–28
Pts: Ostrowski 17		Pts: Christodoulou 18

Olympiahalle, Munich
Attendance: 3,500
Referees: Wieslaw Zych (POL), Carl Jungebrand (FIN)

1 July
17:30

Boxscore

Russia	82–61	Estonia
Scoring by half: 40–31, 42–30
Pts: Fetisov, Sukharev 18		Pts: Babenko 19

Olympiahalle, Munich
Attendance: 3,500
Referees: Peter George (GER), Nikolaos Pitsilkas (GRE)

1 July
19:00

Boxscore

Spain	77–79 (OT)	Germany
Scoring by half: 37–35, 35–37 Overtime: 5–7
Pts: Herreros 19		Pts: Welp 23

Olympiahalle, Munich
Attendance: 4,000
Referees: Danko Radic (CRO), Michail Grigoriev (RUS)

1 July
21:00

Boxscore

Croatia	98–78	Bosnia and Herzegovina
Scoring by half: 51–41, 47–37
Pts: Rađa 28		Pts: Bilalović 24

Olympiahalle, Munich
Attendance: 3,400
Referees: Pascal Dorizon (FRA), Reuven Virovnik (ISR)

==== Semifinals ====
2 July
19:00

Boxscore

Russia	84–76	Croatia
Scoring by half: 43–37, 41–39
Pts: Bazarevich 23		Pts: Cvjetićanin 15

Olympiahalle, Munich
Attendance: 6,500
Referees: Wieslaw Zych (POL), Pascal Dorizon (FRA)

2 July
21:00

Boxscore

Greece	73–76	Germany
Scoring by half: 31–34, 42–42
Pts: Christodoulou 23		Pts: Welp 15

Olympiahalle, Munich
Attendance: 7,500
Referees: Reuven Virovnik (ISR), Miguel Betancor (ESP)

==== Third place ====
3 July
21:00

Boxscore

Croatia	99–59	Greece
Scoring by half: 46–33, 53–26
Pts: Perasović 31		Pts: Giannakis 15

Olympiahalle, Munich
Referees: Carl Jungebrand (FIN), Michail Grigoriev (RUS)

==== Final ====
4 July
20:45

Boxscore

Russia	70–71	Germany
Scoring by half: 35–38, 35–33
Pts: Babkov 22		Pts: Welp 18

Olympiahalle, Munich
Attendance: 10,850
Referees: Miguel Betancor (ESP), Nikolaos Pitsilkas (GRE)

=== 5th to 8th place ===
Classification round
2 July – 13:00
Estonia	99
Bosnia and Herzegovina	91
2 July – 15:30
France	83
Spain	95

Fifth place
3 July – 19:00
Estonia	80
Spain	119
Seventh place
4 July – 18:00
Bosnia and Herzegovina	75
France	83

2 July
13:00

Boxscore

Estonia	99–91	Bosnia and Herzegovina
Scoring by half: 43–38, 56–53
Pts: Kuusmaa 40		Pts: Bilalović 29

Olympiahalle, Munich
Attendance: 1,500
Referees: Peter George (GER), Nikolaos Pitsilkas (GRE)

2 July
15:30

Boxscore

France	83–95	Spain
Scoring by half: 40–45, 43–50
Pts: Adams 18		Pts: Martín Espina, Villacampa 24

Olympiahalle, Munich
Attendance: 2,000
Referees: Carl Jungebrand (FIN), Tihomir Bubalo (SRB)

3 July
19:00

Boxscore

Estonia	80–119	Spain
Scoring by half: 33–60, 47–59
Pts: Babenko 25		Pts: San Epifanio, Villacampa 18

Olympiahalle, Munich
Attendance: 1,000
Referees: Danko Radic (CRO), Reuven Virovnik (ISR)

4 July
18:00

Boxscore

Bosnia and Herzegovina	75–83	France
Scoring by half: 34–41, 41–42
Pts: Bilalović 24		Pts: Rigaudeau 23

Olympiahalle, Munich
Attendance: 2,000
Referees: Peter George (GER), Reuven Virovnik (ISR)

== Awards ==
1993 FIBA EuroBasket champions

Germany
1st title

1993 FIBA EuroBasket MVP: Chris Welp ( Germany)

All-Tournament Team
(Russia) Sergei Bazarevich
(Spain) Jordi Villacampa
(Greece) Fanis Christodoulou
(Germany) Chris Welp (MVP)
(Croatia) Dino Rađa

== Final standings ==
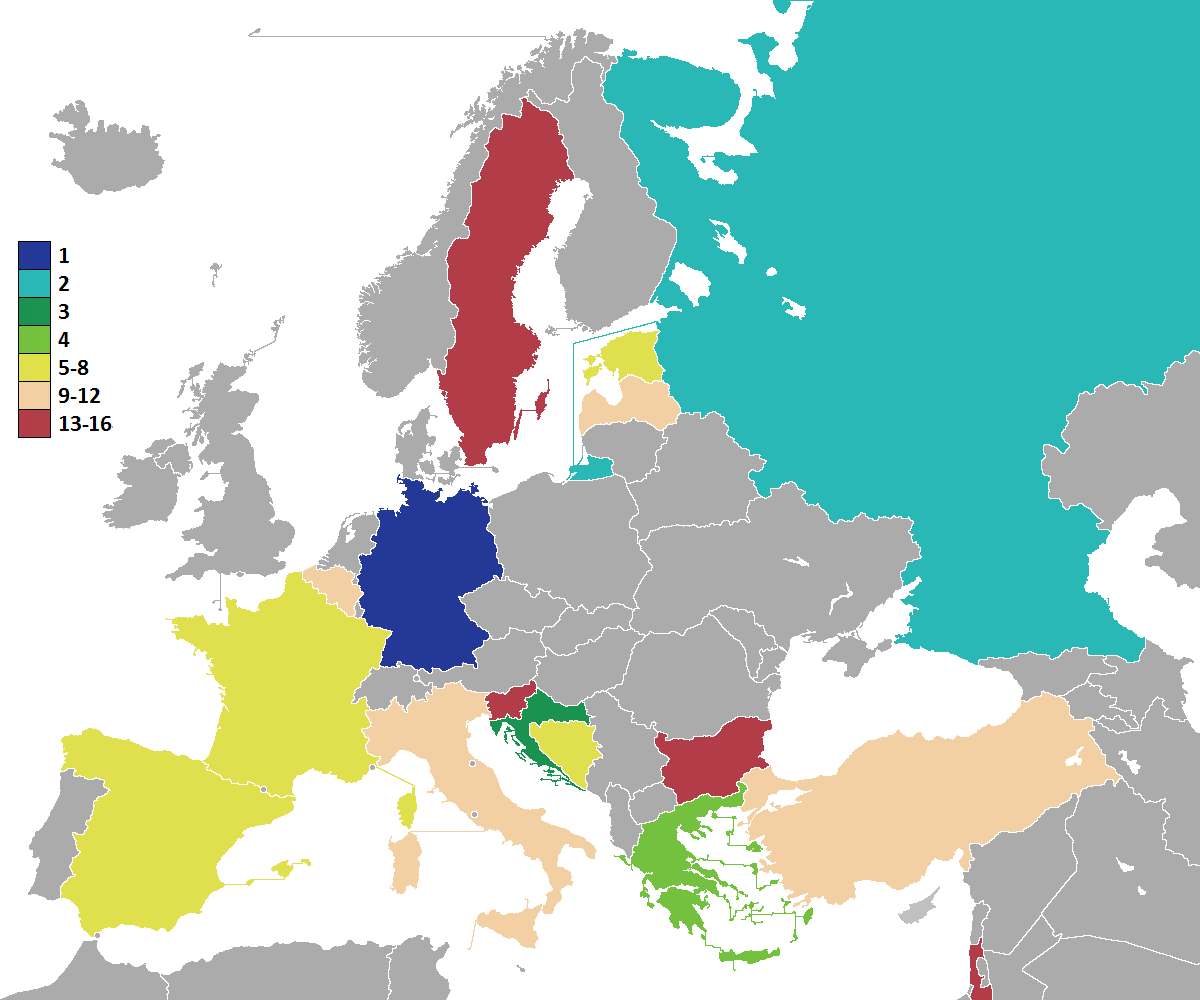
Results

Qualified for the 1994 FIBA World Championship

Rank	Team	Record
1st place, gold medalist(s)	Germany	6–3
2nd place, silver medalist(s)	Russia	6–3
3rd place, bronze medalist(s)	Croatia	8–1
4	Greece	5–4
5	Spain	7–2
6	Estonia	4–5
7	France	6–3
8	Bosnia and Herzegovina	2–7
9	Italy	2–4
10	Latvia	2–4
11	Turkey	2–4
12	Belgium	1–5
13	Israel	1–2
14	Slovenia	1–2
15	Sweden	1–2
16	Bulgaria	0–3

1st	2nd	3rd	4th
Germany Moritz Kleine-Brockhoff; Henrik Rödl; Michael Koch; Chris Welp; Teoman Öztürk; Henning Harnisch; Gunther Behnke; Stephan Baeck; Hansi Gnad; Kai Nürnberger; Jens Kujawa; Mike Jackel	Russia Vladimir Gorin; Dmitry Shakulin; Dmitry Sukharev; Maksim Astanin; Vitaliy Nosov; Sergei Bazarevich; Sergei Babkov; Mikhail Michajlov; Vasily Karasev; Andrei Fetisov; Sergei Panov; Vladislav Kondratov	Croatia Velimir Perasović; Alan Gregov; Ivica Žurić; Vladan Alanović; Franjo Arapović; Žan Tabak; Stojko Vranković; Danko Cvjetićanin; Arijan Komazec; Dino Rađa; Emilio Kovačić; Veljko Mršić	Greece Giorgos Bosganas; Kostas Patavoukas; Panagiotis Giannakis; Lefteris Kakiousis; Giorgos Sigalas; Efthimis Bakatsias; Nasos Galakteros; Christos Tsekos; Giannis Papagiannis; Panagiotis Fasoulas; Nikos Oikonomou; Fanis Christodoulou
