= Ronny Bayer =

Belgian basketball player

Ronny Philomena Bayer
Personal information
- Born: February 17, 1966 (age 60) Antwerp, Belgium
- Listed height: 1.86 m (6 ft 1 in)
- Listed weight: 185 lb (84 kg)

Career information
- Playing career: 1985–2003
- Position: Point guard
- Coaching career: 2003–present

Career history
- 1985–1990: Racing Mechelen
- 1990–1999: Sunair Oostende
- 1999–2002: Telindus Union Mons-Hainaut
- 2002–2003: Okapi Aalstar

Career highlights
- FIBA European Selection (1995); FIBA EuroStar (1996); 4× Belgian League champion (1987, 1989, 1990, 1995); 6× Belgian Cup winner (1986, 1987, 1990, 1991, 1997, 1998); Belgian Player of the Year (1990)

Ronny Philomena Bayer (born February 17, 1966) is a former Belgian professional basketball player. At a height of 1.86 m (6'1 1/4") tall, he played at the point guard position. He was born in Antwerp, Belgium.

== Professional career ==
Bayer spent the major part of his club career playing with Oostende. He was the Belgian Player of the Year in 1990, a FIBA European Selection team member in 1995, and a FIBA EuroStar, in 1996.

== National team career ==
Bayer was a regular member of the senior Belgian national basketball team. With Belgium, he played at the 1993 EuroBasket.
