= Pavel Bečka =

Czech basketball player

Personal information
- Born: 7 November 1970 (age 56) Ústí nad Labem, Czechoslovakia
- Listed height: 205 cm (6 ft 9 in)
- Listed weight: 110 kg (243 lb)

Career information
- Playing career: 1995–2006
- Position: Power forward / center
- Number: 8, 13

Career history
- 1995–2004: Oldenburger TB / EWE Oldenburg
- 2006: EWE Oldenburg

Career highlights
- Czechoslovak League All-Star Five (1992); No. 8 retired by EWE Baskets Oldenburg
Medals
Representing Czechoslovakia
Men's basketball
European Under-18 Championship
| Bronze medal – third place | 1988 Yugoslavia | Under-18 Team |

Pavel Bečka (born 7 November 1970) is a former Czech professional basketball player. Bečka mainly played as a center.

== Professional career ==
Bečka spent the majority of his pro career with EWE Baskets Oldenburg. His jersey number 8 was retired by the club.

== National team career ==
Bečka also represented the senior Czechoslovakia national team, and later the senior Czech Republic national team. He played at the 1991 EuroBasket, and at the 1999 EuroBasket.
