= Henning Harnisch =

German basketball player (born 1968)

Personal information
- Born: 15 April 1968 (age 58) Marburg, West Germany
- Listed height: 2.03 m (6 ft 8 in)
- Listed weight: 93 kg (205 lb)

Career information
- Playing career: 1985–1998
- Position: Small forward / power forward

Career history
- 1985–1988: Gießen 46ers
- 1988–1996: Bayer Giants Leverkusen
- 1996–1998: Alba Berlin

Career highlights
- FIBA EuroStar (1996); 9× German League champion (1990–1998); 5× German Cup winner (1990, 1991, 1993, 1995, 1997); 2× German Player of the Year (1990, 1991)

Henning Harnisch (born 15 April 1968) is a retired German professional basketball player. At a height of 2.03 m (6 ft 8 in) tall, he played at the small forward and power forward positions. He currently serves as vice president for the German Basketball Bundesliga team Alba Berlin, and is in charge of Alba's youth program. In addition to that, he is the China ambassador for Alba Berlin.

== Professional career ==
Harnisch played professional basketball for the German Basketball Bundesliga teams Gießen 46ers, Bayer Giants Leverkusen, and Alba Berlin. From 1990 to 1998, Harnisch won 9 German Basketball Championships in a row (7 with Leverkusen and 2 with Berlin), a record that has not yet been broken. Furthermore, Harnisch also won 5 German Cups (4 with Leverkusen and 1 with Berlin). Because of his spectacular slam dunks, Harnisch was known throughout his playing career, as the Flying Henning.

== National team career ==
As a member of the senior German national basketball team, Harnisch competed at the 1992 Summer Olympics, four EuroBaskets, and one FIBA World Cup. He was a member of the team that won Germany's first gold medal, at the 1993 EuroBasket.
