= Rauno Pehka =

Estonian basketball player

Los Toros/TALTECH
- Title: Head coach
- League: I liiga

Personal information
- Born: 1 January 1969 (age 57) Keila, Estonia
- Listed height: 6 ft 2 in (1.88 m)
- Listed weight: 202 lb (92 kg)

Career information
- Playing career: 1986–2006
- Position: Point guard

Career history
- 1986–1987: TSIK
- 1987–1989: Rīgas ASK
- 1989–1992: Kalev
- 1992–1993: Beitar Ramat Gan
- 1993–1994: BK Brocēni
- 1994–1996: Kalev
- 1996–1997: BC Tallinn
- 1998–1999: Maccabi Ramat Gan
- 2000: TTÜ/A. Le Coq
- 2000–2001: Telindus Oostende
- 2001–2003: Kalev
- 2003–2004: TTÜ/A. Le Coq
- 2004–2005: Nybit
- 2005–2006: Pirita

Career highlights
- KML Finals Most Valuable Player (2004); USSR League champion (1991); 6× Estonian Champion (1992, 1995–1998, 2002, 2003); Latvian Champion (1987); Belgian Champion (2001); 3× Estonian Cup Winner (1992, 1996, 2001); Latvian Cup Winner (1996); Belgian SuperCup (2001)

Rauno Pehka (born 1 January 1969) is a retired Estonian professional basketball player who played mostly at the point guard position.

He won the Soviet Union league championship in 1991 as a member of the Tallinn Kalev basketball team. Pehka mostly played in Estonia. After retiring Rauno Pehka has been working as a national teams' youth coach.

== International career ==
Besides competing in the highest level of Estonian basketball, Rauno Pehka has played in Belgium for BC Oostende, in Israel for Ironi Ramat Gan and in Latvia for Rīgas ASK. With Estonian national team he competed in two EuroBasket competitions: EuroBasket 1993, EuroBasket 2001. In 2008–2009 he was assistant coach of the Estonia national basketball team.

== Books ==
- Lään, Vello; Ibrus, Märt (2006). Eesti korvpall portreed. Eesti Korvpalliliit. pp. 311–319. ISBN 9949-406-68-4.
