= Vladimir Stepania =

Georgian basketball player (born 1976)

Personal information
- Born: May 8, 1976 (age 50) Tbilisi, Georgian SSR, Soviet Union
- Listed height: 7 ft 0 in (2.13 m)
- Listed weight: 236 lb (107 kg)

Career information
- NBA draft: 1998: 1st round, 27th overall pick
- Drafted by: Seattle SuperSonics
- Playing career: 1995–2004
- Position: Center
- Number: 5, 50, 11

Career history
- 1995–1996: Slovan
- 1996–1999: Union Olimpija
- 1998–2000: Seattle SuperSonics
- 2000–2001: New Jersey Nets
- 2001–2003: Miami Heat
- 2003–2004: Portland Trail Blazers

Career highlights
- FIBA EuroStar (1997); 3× Slovenian League champion (1997–1999); 3× Slovenian Cup winner (1997–1999)

Career NBA statistics
- Points: 1,118 (4.1 ppg)
- Rebounds: 1,180 (4.4 rpg)
- Blocks: 144 (0.5 bpg)
- Stats at NBA.com
- Stats at Basketball Reference

Vladimir Stepania (born 8 May 1976) is a Georgian former professional basketball player. He played at the center position.

== Professional career ==
After starting to play basketball in his native country, Stepania played several years in Slovenia, namely with Olimpija Ljubljana, partnering with another center, Rasho Nesterović, in his first year.

Selected by the Seattle SuperSonics, late in the first round of the 1998 NBA draft, Stepania became the first Georgian player to play in the NBA. For six seasons, in which he was a backup, he represented the Sonics, the New Jersey Nets, the Miami Heat, and the Portland Trail Blazers, averaging 4.1 points (with a total of 1,118 points scored) and 4.4 rebounds per game, in 270 regular season games.

His best season was in 2002–03, with the Heat, in which he averaged 5.6 points and seven rebounds per game, battling for position in a club which had lost Alonzo Mourning for the year, with a kidney ailment; Stepania's career-high in points was 19, coming on 16 November 2001, against the Charlotte Hornets. On 19 November 2002, playing for the Heat against the Milwaukee Bucks, he recorded a career-best 15 rebounds.

In 2004, after a slow year with the Blazers, Stepania retired from playing professional basketball, at only 28.

== National team career ==
Stepania was a member of the senior Georgian national basketball team.

== NBA career statistics ==
Legend
GP	Games played	GS	Games started	MPG	Minutes per game
FG%	Field goal percentage	3P%	3-point field goal percentage	FT%	Free throw percentage
RPG	Rebounds per game	APG	Assists per game	SPG	Steals per game
BPG	Blocks per game	PPG	Points per game	**Bold**	Career high

=== Regular season ===
Year	Team	GP	GS	MPG	FG%	3P%	FT%	RPG	APG	SPG	BPG	PPG
1998–99	Seattle	23	**6**	13.6	.424	.000	.525	3.3	.5	.4	**1.0**	5.5
1999–00	Seattle	30	1	6.7	.367	.000	.472	1.6	.1	.3	.4	2.5
2000–01	New Jersey	29	0	9.7	.318	.250	**.735**	3.8	**.6**	.3	.4	2.8
2001–02	Miami	67	4	13.2	**.470**	**.500**	.481	4.0	.2	.4	.7	4.3
2002–03	Miami	**79**	**6**	**20.2**	.433	—	.530	**7.0**	.3	**.6**	.5	**5.6**
2003–04	Portland	42	2	10.8	.417	—	.611	3.0	.5	.3	.4	2.6
Career		270	19	13.8	.425	.133	.536	4.4	.3	.4	.5	4.1
