= Mike Plowden =

American born basketball player-coach

Michael Plowden
- Born: June 2, 1958; Saginaw, Michigan, U.S.
- Died: February 28, 2008 (aged 49); Barreiro, Lisbon, Portugal
- Occupations: Basketball player and coach

Michael Ray Plowden (June 2, 1958 – February 28, 2008) was an American-born Portuguese naturalized basketball player and coach. He played as a power forward.

Plowden was born in Saginaw, Michigan, the son of Eugene Plowden and Inez Golden Plowden. His father was a Baptist pastor. He played basketball as a student at Buena Vista High School and Saginaw Valley State College. He moved to Portugal in 1980, after college, to play for Barreirense. He later would represent Benfica, in the best years of his career, winning several National Champion titles and the Cup of Portugal. He was capped 61 times for Portugal, since 1988.

Plowden, after ending his player career, become a coach. He died suddenly while coaching Quintajense, at his team pavilion in Barreiro. He was 49 years old, and left a wife and a son.
