= Marcel Țenter =

Romanian basketball player and coach

Current position
- Title: Head coach

Biographical details
- Born: July 26, 1969 (age 57); Satu Mare, Romania

Playing career
- 1987–1995: Universitatea Cluj-Napoca
- 1995–1996: HKE - Hódmezővásárhely
- 1996–1997: Kaposvári KK
- 1997–2003: Szolnoki Olaj KK
- 2003–2004: Maccabi Ashdod
- 2004–2005: Brose Baskets
- 2005–2006: Nürnberger BC
- 2006–2009: U-Mobitelco Cluj-Napoca
- Position: Point guard

Coaching career (HC unless noted)
- 2009–2012: U-Mobitelco Cluj-Napoca
- 2012–2014: Gaz Metan Mediaș
- 2014: Alba Fehérvár Basketball
- 2014–2016: U-Mobitelco Cluj-Napoca

Marcel Dan Țenter (born July 26, 1969) is a former Romanian basketball coach and a former professional basketball player.

== Basketball career ==
=== Coach ===
Țenter began his coaching career as Assistant Coach in U-Mobitelco Cluj-Napoca near The American coach, Tab Baldwin. He won the Romanian championship as Head Coach with the team in 2010/11 season.

On June 7, 2012, Țenter signed with a team of Gaz Metan Mediaș for two years, the team playing in the Romanian Basketball League and the EuroChallenge. He won Romanian Cup in season 2012–2013. Since 2013 he is head coach also at the national man team of Romania.. On 29 May he signed for Alba Fehérvár with 1+1 year deal.
