= Yevgen Murzin =

Soviet and Ukrainian basketball player and coach

Yevhen Murzin (born September 24, 1965 in Novosibirsk) is a former Soviet and Ukrainian men's basketball player and current Ukrainian basketball coach. Currently he is a manager of the Ukrainian Basketball SuperLeague team Kharkivski Sokoly.

He coached the Ukrainian national team at the EuroBasket 2015 and EuroBasket 2017.
