= Steve Rocha =

American-born Portuguese basketball player and coach

Personal information
- Born: November 6, 1960 (age 66) Modesto, California
- Listed height: 6 ft 8.7 in (2.05 m)

Career information
- High school: Modesto High School
- College: San Diego (1980–1982)
- NBA draft: 1982: undrafted
- Playing career: 1982–1997
- Position: Power forward / center

Career history
- 1984–1986: Sangalhos
- 1986–1988: FC Porto
- 1988–1989: Ovarense
- 1989–1992: FC Porto
- 1992–1995: Benfica
- 1995–1996: Beira-Mar
- 1996–1997: Benfica

Career highlights
- 3× Portuguese League champion (1993–1995); 7× Portuguese Cup winner (1987–1989, 1991, 1993–1995); 3× Portuguese League Cup winner (1993–1995); 4× Portuguese Supercup winner (1986, 1988, 1994, 1996)

Steven Wayne "Steve" Rocha (born 1960) is an American-born Portuguese retired basketball player and a current coach. He played as a center. Rocha is of Portuguese origin and latter settled in Portugal, where he became one of the best players for his adopted country. He has a degree in Business Administration at the University of San Diego and was working on his master's degree in Physical Education.

== Career ==
Born in Modesto, California, he first played at Modesto High School, then at Modesto Junior College, for two years, and at the University of San Diego. After that, he moved to Portugal, where he spent 13 years of his career, the other being spent in Germany.

He played for some of the best Portuguese teams, Sangalhos, FC Porto and Ovarense, before being assigned to Benfica. He was a leading name in their golden era of basketball, winning 2 titles of National Champion and 5 Cups of Portugal.

Rocha went to become also a charismatic player for Portugal, with 61 caps, from 1988 to 1993.

After ending his career, he became a basketball coach. He coached for five years in the Portuguese LCB, then returning to the United States. He was assistant coach at CSU Stanislaus and he's currently at Modesto Junior College.
