= Efthimis Bakatsias =

Greek professional basketball player

Personal information
- Born: January 14, 1968 (age 58) Athens, Greece
- Listed height: 6 ft 5 in (1.96 m)
- Listed weight: 200 lb (91 kg)

Career information
- NBA draft: 1990: undrafted
- Playing career: 1989–2000
- Position: Point guard

Career history
- 1989–1993: Pagrati (Greece)
- 1993–1998: Olympiacos (Greece)
- 1998–2000: Peristeri (Greece)

Career highlights
- EuroLeague champion (1997); 4× Greek League champion (1994–1997); 2× Greek Cup winner (1994, 1997); Greek League All-Star (1994 II)

Efthimis Bakatsias (alternate spelling: Efthimios, Greek: Ευθύμης Μπακατσιάς, Greek pronunciation: [ef'θimis bakat͡s'ças]; January 14, 1968) is a retired Greek professional basketball player. Born in Athens, he played professionally in the Greek Basket League and represented Greece at senior level.

== Professional career ==
Bakatsias started his pro career with Pagrati. He played for Olympiacos from 1993 to 1998, winning with them four Greek League championships (1994, 1995, 1996, 1997) and two Greek Cups (1994, 1997). In 1997, while with Olympiacos, Bakatsias won the EuroLeague's Final Four title, as well as both Greek League and the Greek Cup titles, making him a winner of the Triple Crown. He also participated at two EuroLeague Finals (1994 Tel Aviv, 1995 Saragoza), and at the 1997 McDonald's Championship final.

== National team career ==
Bakatsias was a member of the senior Greek national basketball team. With Greece's senior team, he played at the 1988 European Olympic Qualifying Tournament, the 1993 EuroBasket, the 1994 FIBA World Championship, and the 1995 EuroBasket. He also played at the 1996 Summer Olympics, and the 1997 EuroBasket. In total, Bakatsias appeared in 84 games with Greece's senior team, averaging 4.8 points per game.
