= Dmitri Sukharev =

Russian basketball player (born 1960)

Personal information
- Full name: Dmitri Vladimirovich Sukharev
- Nationality: Russian
- Born: 25 December 1960 (age 65) Chkalovsk, Tajik Soviet Socialist Republic, Soviet Union

Sport
- Sport: Basketball

Dmitri Vladimirovich Sukharev (Russian: Дмитрий Владимирович Сухарев; born 25 December 1960) is a Russian former basketball player. He competed in the men's tournament at the 1992 Summer Olympics.
