= Tim Lewis (basketball) =

British basketball coach (born 1967)

Minnesota Timberwolves
- Position: Assistant coach
- League: NBA

Personal information
- Born: 26 October 1967 (age 59)

Career information
- High school: Don Bosco Tech
- College: University of New Hampshire
- Coaching career: 1993–present

Career history

Coaching
- 1997-1998: England U16 Assistant Coach
- 1998-2000: Head Coach England U16
- 2000-2002: Assistant Coach England U18
- 2002 -2004: Head Coach England U18
- 2004-2007: Head Coach Great Britain U20
- 2006-2012: Assistant Coach Great Britain Olympic Team
- 2006-2008: Head Coach Canarias Basketball Academy
- 2008-2011: Head Coach Essex Pirates
- 2011-2012: Assistant Coach at the London 2012 Olympics
- 2012-2013: Head Coach Weissenhorn Youngstars
- 2013–2014: Head Coach Hitachi Sunrockers, Japan NBL
- 2014–2015: Associate Head Coach, Bakersfield Jam, Phoenix Suns
- 2015–2016: Associate Head Coach, Raptors 905, Toronto Raptors
- 2016–2017: Thailand
- 2017: Consultant TNT PBA, Philippines and Philippines National Team
- 2017–2018: Head Coach QATAR National Team
- 2021–2022: Iowa Wolves (Associate Head Coach)
- 2026–present: Minnesota Timberwolves (assistant)

Timothy Charles Lewis (born 26 October 1967) is a British basketball coach who currently serves as an assistant coach for the Minnesota Timberwolves of the National Basketball Association (NBA). He was formerly the head coach for the Thailand men's national basketball team and Assistant coach to the Great Britain 2012 Olympic Team.

== Coaching career ==
=== Early career ===
Lewis began coaching in 1990s before serving as Director of Coaching for the Sevenoaks Suns between 2004 and 2007. He then spent two years coaching the now-defunct Essex Pirates before spending the 2011–12 season as the Director of Basketball at the Sheffield Sharks.

=== Great Britain national teams ===
Between 2006 and 2012, Lewis served as the head coach of the Great Britain U20 national team and as an assistant with the Great Britain senior national team.

=== Return to professional basketball ===
In 2012–13, Lewis was head coach of Weissenhorn Youngstars, and in 2013–14, he was head coach of the Hitachi Sunrockers. In June 2014, he was appointed an assistant coach for the Panama men's national basketball team.

Lewis spent the 2014–15 season as the lead assistant coach for the Bakersfield Jam of the NBA Development League.

On 28 July 2015, Lewis was named an assistant coach for Raptors 905.

=== Thailand national team ===
On 2016, Lewis was hired as the new Thailand men's national basketball team coach. His first experience as a head coach in international play was in the 2016 SEABA Cup, the Southeast Asian qualifying tournament for the 2016 FIBA Asia Challenge.

=== Philippines national team consultant ===
Lewis in 2017 worked with the staff of the Philippines men's national basketball teamthat will play at the 2017 Southeast Asian Games as a consultant.

=== Iowa Wolves (2021–2022) ===
On 26 October 2021, Lewis became an assistant coach for the Iowa Wolves of the NBA G League.

=== Minnesota Timberwolves (2026–present) ===
On September 25, 2026, the Minnesota Timberwolves hired Lewis to serve as an assistant coach under head coach Chris Finch.

== Head coach national team Qatar ==
October 2018 fired and replaced
