= Éric Struelens =

Belgian basketball player

Personal information
- Born: 3 November 1969 (age 57) Watermael-Boitsfort, Belgium
- Listed height: 2.08 m (6 ft 10 in)
- Listed weight: 120 kg (265 lb)

Career information
- Playing career: 1987–2010
- Position: Power forward / center

Career history
- 1987–1988: Excelsior Brussels
- 1988–1995: R.C. Mechelen
- 1995–1996: Spirou Charleroi
- 1996–1998: Paris Basket Racing
- 1998–2002: Real Madrid
- 2002–2005: CB Girona
- 2005: Panellinios
- 2005–2007: Atomia Brussels
- 2007-2010: Excelsior Brussels
- 2014–2015: Waterloo Basket
- 2017: Arentine La Hulpe

Career highlights
- FIBA EuroStar (1998); Spanish League champion (2000); French League champion (1997); 7× Belgian League champion (1989, 1990, 1991, 1992, 1993, 1994, 1996); 4× Belgian Cup winner (1990, 1993, 1994, 1996); 2× Belgian Player of the Year (1991–1992); Belgian League Rookie of the Year (1989)

Éric Struelens (born 3 November 1969) is a former Belgian professional basketball player.

== Professional career ==
Struelens won the Belgian League championship seven times (six with Racing Mechelen and one with Spirou Charleroi) and the Belgian Cup four times (three with Mechelen and one with Charleroi). He also twice won the Player of the Year award in Belgium.

Struelens then moved abroad, to Paris Basket Racing, in France, where he won the French League championship, before joining Real Madrid in Spain. Struelens also won the Spanish League championship with Real Madrid.

== National team career ==
Struelens was a key player of the senior Belgian national basketball team. With Belgium, he played at the EuroBasket 1993.
