= Iain MacLean (basketball) =

Scottish basketball player and coach

Iain Maclean (born 1965) is a Scottish basketball coach. He was the head coach of the Scotland men's national basketball team and the Glasgow Storm club. He is also known for his time as a player for teams in both Scotland and Great Britain. Maclean is also head coach of the Scotland Men's Universities basketball team which won the BUSA Home Nations Basketball title in April 2007. Maclean played NCAA Division I college basketball at Northern Arizona University and played professionally with the former MIM Livingston team and the Scottish Rocks in the British Basketball League. He also coached the Scottish Rocks during the 2001–02 season after Greg Lockridge was fired.

== Career history ==
- 2001–02 (United Kingdom) St Mirren (player/coach)
- 1998–2001 (United Kingdom) Scottish Rocks
- 1987–98 (United Kingdom) Midlothian/Livingston Bulls
- 1984–86 (United Kingdom) Paisley

== Trivia ==
- Scottish Rocks retired the number 13 jersey in honour of Maclean.

== See also ==
- Scottish Rocks
