= Dejan Jovanovski =

Macedonian basketball player

Personal information
- Born: March 26, 1973 (age 53) Skopje, SR Macedonia, SFR Yugoslavia
- Listed height: 6 ft 6 in (1.98 m)

Career information
- NBA draft: 1995: undrafted
- Playing career: 1992–2006
- Position: Small forward / shooting guard

Career history
- 1992–1997: Rabotnički
- 1997–1998: Nikol Fert
- 1998–1999: MZT Skopje
- 1999–2000: Oyak Renault
- 2000–2001: Lugano Tigers
- 2001–2002: Nikol Fert
- 2002–2003: Peristeri
- 2003–2004: Chorale Roanne Basket
- 2004–2005: Élan Chalon
- 2005–2006: Rabotnički

Dejan Jovanovski (born March 26, 1973) is a former Macedonian professional basketball player. He was member of the Macedonia national basketball team.

== Achievements ==
- KK Rabotnički
  - Macedonian First League Champion - 1992–93, 1993–94, 1994–95, 1995–96, 1996–97, 2005–06
  - Macedonian Basketball Cup Winner - 1994, 2006
- KK Gostivar
  - Macedonian Basketball Cup Winner - 2002
- Lugano Tigers
  - Ligue Nationale de Basket Champion - 2000–2001

== Macedonian national team ==
Dejan Jovanovski was a member of the Macedonian national basketball team. He played on the EuroBasket 1999.
