= Sergei Babenko =

Estonian basketball player

Personal information
- Born: 19 September 1961 (age 65) Ulan-Ude, Russian Soviet Federative Socialist Republic, Soviet Union
- Listed height: 6 ft 10 in (2.08 m)
- Position: Power forward / center

Career history
- ?–?: Lokomotiv Chabarovsk
- ?–?: BC Donetsk
- 1989–1992: KK Kalev
- 1992–1994: Maccabi Ramat Gan
- 1994–1995: MBK Dynamo Moscow
- 1998: Elitzur Ashkelon

Career highlights
- USSR League champion (1991)
Medals
Men's basketball
Representing Soviet Union
European Championships
Silver medal – second place	1987 Greece	Team

Sergei Babenko (born 19 September 1961) is an Estonian retired professional basketball player who played mostly at the shooting guard position. His most notable achievement as a member of the Soviet Union national team was the winning of the silver medal in the 1987 EuroBasket competition. He was also a member of KK Kalev, who won the USSR Premier Basketball League in 1991. He was 6th in EuroBasket 1993 with Estonia national team.
