= Georgi Mladenov =

Bulgarian basketball player and coach

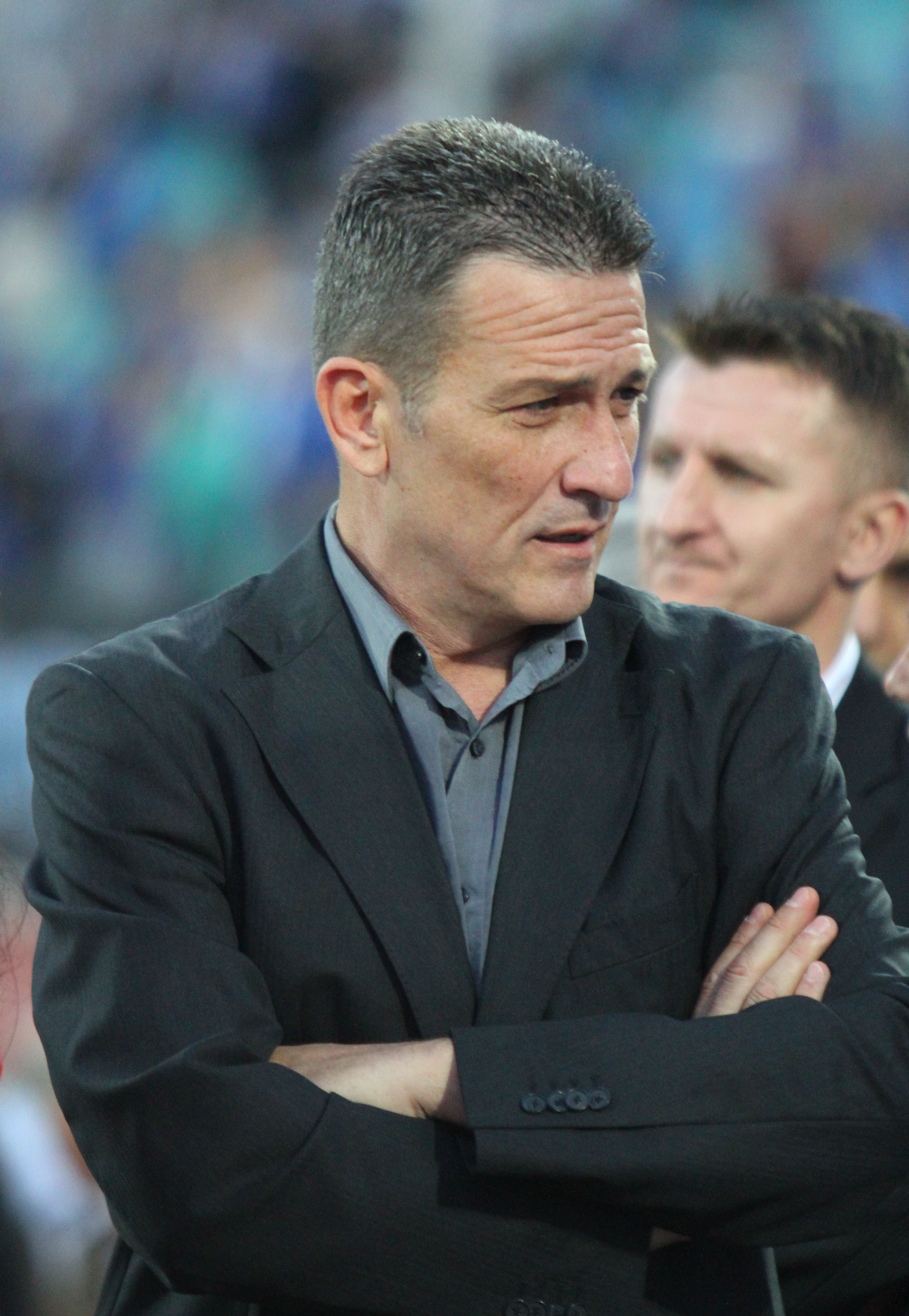

Personal information
- Born: May 11, 1962 (age 64) Sofia, Bulgaria
- Listed height: 1.92 m (6 ft 4 in)
- Listed weight: 97 kg (214 lb)

Career information
- Playing career: 1978–2003
- Position: Shooting guard / small forward
- Coaching career: 2003–present

Career history

Playing
- 1978–1991: Levski Sofia
- 1991–1992: Stade Nabeulien
- 1992–1994: Levski Sofia
- 1994–1996: Plama Pleven
- 1996–1997: Slavia Sofia
- 1997: Club in Saudi Arabia
- 1998–2003: Levski Sofia
- 2003: Spartak Euroins

Coaching
- 2003–2005: Spartak Euroins
- 2006–2009: Balkan Botevgrad
- 2008–2009: Bulgaria U18
- 2009: Lukoil Academic
- 2009–2010: Bulgaria U18
- 2010: AS Salé
- 2010–2011: Beroe (women)
- 2011–2013: Beroe
- 2012–2013: Bulgaria U18
- 2014: Bulgaria
- 2015–2016: Basket Rimini Crabs
- 2016–2017: Traiskirchen Lions

Career highlights
- As player: FIBA European Selection (1996); 2× FIBA Saporta Cup Top Scorer (1994, 1997); 11× Bulgarian League champion (1979, 1981, 1982, 1986, 1993, 1994, 1995, 1996, 1997, 2000, 2001); 7× Bulgarian Cup winner (1979, 1982, 1983, 1993, 1995, 1997, 2001); Tunisian League champion (1992)

Georgi Mladenov (born 11 May 1962 in Sofia) is a Bulgarian professional basketball coach, and a former professional basketball player. During his playing career, at a height of 1.92 m (6'3 3/4") tall, he played at the shooting guard and small forward positions.

== Professional career ==
During his club playing career, Mladenov played with Levski Sofia, Stade Nabeulien, Plama Pleven, Slavia Sofia, and Spartak Euroins. He was a member of the FIBA European Selection Team in 1996.

== National team career ==
Mladenov was also a member of the senior Bulgarian national basketball team, before retiring in 2003.

== Honours and awards ==
=== Playing career ===
Levski Sofia

- Bulgarian League champion (8×): (1979, 1981, 1982, 1986, 1993, 1994, 2000, 2001)
- Bulgarian Cup winner (5×): (1979, 1982, 1983, 1993, 2001)

Stade Nabeulien

- Tunisian League champion: (1992)

Plama Pleven

- Bulgarian League champion (2×): (1995, 1996)
- Bulgarian Cup winner: (1995)

Slavia Sofia

- Bulgarian League champion: (1997)
- Bulgarian Cup winner: (1997)
