= Marek Noormets =

Estonian basketball player (born 1971)

Marek Noormets (born 14 June 1971) is an Estonian basketball player.

He was born in Tartu. In 2003 he graduated from the University of Tartu's Institute of Physical Education.

He began his basketball career in 1988, coached by Harri Russak. Later his coaches were Arne Laos and Jaak Salumets. 1990–1996 he played for Kalev. 1990–2002 he was a member of Estonia men's national basketball team.

He has also practiced competitive dance for 10 years.
