= EuroBasket 1993 squads =

European basketball competition teams

The following is the list of squads for each of the 16 teams competing in the EuroBasket 1993, held in Germany between 22 June and 4 July 1993. Each team selected a squad of 12 players for the tournament.

== Group A ==
=== Bosnia and Herzegovina ===
Bosnia and Herzegovina men's national basketball team roster
Players
Coaches

Pos.	No.	Name	Age – Date of birth	Height	Club
PG	4	Samir Selešković	23 – 10 April 1970	1.88 m (6 ft 2 in)	KK Željezničar Sarajevo	(Bosnia and Herzegovina)
F	5	Gordan Firić	22 – 1 September 1970	1.97 m (6 ft 6 in)	KK Bosna Royal	(Bosnia and Herzegovina)
PG	6	Adis Bećiragić	23 – 18 June 1970	1.90 m (6 ft 3 in)	KK Zenica Metalno	(Bosnia and Herzegovina)
F	8	Senad Begović	23 – 13 December 1969		KK Željezničar Sarajevo	(Bosnia and Herzegovina)
G	9	Ilijas Masnić	35 – 21 October 1957		KK Željezničar Sarajevo	(Bosnia and Herzegovina)
C	10	Mario Primorac	31 – 3 October 1961	2.04 m (6 ft 8 in)	Alba Berlin	(Germany)
PF	11	Samir Avdić	26 – 21 March 1967	2.05 m (6 ft 9 in)	KK Bosna Royal	(Bosnia and Herzegovina)
G	12	Emir Mutapčić	33 – 27 May 1960	1.97 m (6 ft 6 in)	Alba Berlin	(Germany)
G	13	Emir Halimić	22 – 10 August 1970	1.98 m (6 ft 6 in)	KK Bosna Royal	(Bosnia and Herzegovina)
C	14	Sabahudin Bilalović	33 – 7 May 1960	2.08 m (6 ft 10 in)	Ironi Nahariya	(Israel)

Head coach

- Ibrahim Krehić

Legend

- Club – describes last
  club before the tournament
- Age – describes age
  on 22 June 1993

=== Russia ===
Russia men's national basketball team roster
Players
Coaches

Pos.	No.	Name	Age – Date of birth	Height	Club
PG	4	Vladimir Gorin	32 – 13 March 1961	1.85 m (6 ft 1 in)	BC Spartak Saint Petersburg	(Russia)
F	5	Dmitry Shakulin	25 – 11 May 1968	1.96 m (6 ft 5 in)	Beitar Tel Aviv	(Israel)
C	6	Dmitri Sukharev	32 – 25 December 1960	2.08 m (6 ft 10 in)	Neuchâtel Basket	(Switzerland)
F	7	Maksim Astanin	24 – 18 June 1969	2.03 m (6 ft 8 in)	PBC CSKA Moscow	(Russia)
C	8	Vitaliy Nosov	25 – 1 February 1968	2.12 m (6 ft 11 in)	BC Avtodor Saratov	(Russia)
PG	9	Sergei Bazarevich	28 – 16 March 1965	1.91 m (6 ft 3 in)	Yildrimspor	(Turkey)
G	10	Sergei Babkov	26 – 5 June 1967	1.92 m (6 ft 4 in)	TBB Trier	(Germany)
C	11	Mikhail Michajlov	22 – 17 May 1971	2.06 m (6 ft 9 in)	BC Spartak Saint Petersburg	(Russia)
PG	12	Vasily Karasev	22 – 14 April 1971	1.93 m (6 ft 4 in)	PBC CSKA Moscow	(Russia)
PF	13	Andrei Fetisov	20 – 19 January 1973	2.08 m (6 ft 10 in)	BC Spartak Saint Petersburg	(Russia)
F	14	Sergei Panov	22 – 30 June 1970	2.05 m (6 ft 9 in)	BC Spartak Saint Petersburg	(Russia)
PF	15	Vladislav Kondratov	21 – 16 September 1971	2.04 m (6 ft 8 in)	PBC CSKA Moscow	(Russia)

Head coach

- Yuri Selikhov

Legend

- Club – describes last
  club before the tournament
- Age – describes age
  on 22 June 1993

=== Spain ===
Spain men's national basketball team roster
Players
Coaches

Pos.	No.	Name	Age – Date of birth	Height	Club
F	4	Jordi Villacampa	29 – 11 October 1963	1.96 m (6 ft 5 in)	Joventut Badalona	(Spain)
PG	5	Rafael Jofresa	26 – 2 September 1966	1.83 m (6 ft 0 in)	Joventut Badalona	(Spain)
PG	6	Tomás Jofresa	23 – 25 January 1970	1.84 m (6 ft 0 in)	Joventut Badalona	(Spain)
C	7	Juan Antonio Orenga	26 – 29 July 1966	2.06 m (6 ft 9 in)	CB Estudiantes	(Spain)
PF	8	Andrés Jiménez	31 – 6 June 1962	2.05 m (6 ft 9 in)	FC Barcelona	(Spain)
C	9	Juan Antonio Morales	24 – 18 April 1969	2.11 m (6 ft 11 in)	Joventut Badalona	(Spain)
PG	10	Nacho Azofra	23 – 23 July 1969	1.85 m (6 ft 1 in)	CB Estudiantes	(Spain)
F	11	Alberto Herreros	24 – 20 April 1969	2.00 m (6 ft 7 in)	CB Estudiantes	(Spain)
F	12	Xavi Crespo	27 – 7 May 1966	2.01 m (6 ft 7 in)	Baloncesto León	(Spain)
C	13	Ferrán Martínez	25 – 25 April 1968	2.12 m (6 ft 11 in)	Joventut Badalona	(Spain)
C	14	Antonio Martín Espina	27 – 18 June 1966	2.10 m (6 ft 11 in)	Real Madrid	(Spain)
F	15	Juan Antonio San Epifanio	34 – 12 June 1959	1.98 m (6 ft 6 in)	FC Barcelona	(Spain)

Head coach

- Lolo Sainz

Legend

- Club – describes last
  club before the tournament
- Age – describes age
  on 22 June 1993

=== Sweden ===
Sweden men's national basketball team roster
Players
Coaches

Pos.	No.	Name	Age – Date of birth	Height	Club
PG	4	Olle Håkanson	20 – 14 August 1972
PG	5	Magnus Tegel	27 – 3 April 1966
PG	6	Örjan Andersson	27 – 24 June 1965
F	7	Henrik Evers	29 – 10 January 1964
G	8	Henrik Gaddefors	28 – 6 April 1965
G	9	Peter Borg	32 – 23 August 1960
C	10	Martin Jansson	24 – 31 December 1968
F	11	Jens Tillman	22 – 10 October 1970	2.00 m (6 ft 7 in)
PF	12	Torbjörn Gehrke	25 – 27 July 1967	2.03 m (6 ft 8 in)
C	13	Anders Marcus	26 – 31 October 1966
F	14	Per Stümer	26 – 27 May 1967
C	15	Mattias Sahlström	25 – 12 February 1968

Head coach

- Rolf Nilsson

Legend

- Club – describes last
  club before the tournament
- Age – describes age
  on 22 June 1993

== Group B ==
=== Bulgaria ===
Bulgaria men's national basketball team roster
Players
Coaches

Pos.	No.	Name	Age – Date of birth	Height	Club
PG	4	Stanislav Stankov	25 – 24 August 1967
C	5	Anton Kharalanov	27 – 7 September 1965
G	6	Dimo Kostov	31 – 1 March 1962
PG	7	Ivajlo Ravutsov	24 – 30 September 1968	1.82 m (6 ft 0 in)
C	8	Spas Natov	25 – 5 February 1968
F	9	Ventsislav Slavov	29 – 13 November 1963
G	10	Daniel Dimitrov	26 – 15 May 1967
F	11	Vladimir Dimitrov	20 – 9 December 1972
F	12	Georgi Mladenov	31 – 11 May 1962	1.92 m (6 ft 4 in)
F	13	Vasil Stojanov	21 – 12 September 1971
F	14	Robert Gergov	28 – 24 May 1965	2.06 m (6 ft 9 in)
C	15	Lubomir Amiorkov	31 – 21 June 1962

Head coach

- Simeon Varčev

Legend

- Club – describes last
  club before the tournament
- Age – describes age
  on 22 June 1993

=== Croatia ===
Croatia men's national basketball team roster
Players
Coaches

Pos.	No.	Name	Age – Date of birth	Height	Club
G	4	Velimir Perasović	28 – 9 February 1965	1.95 m (6 ft 5 in)	CB Breogán	(Spain)
PG	5	Alan Gregov	23 – 1 April 1970	1.91 m (6 ft 3 in)	KK Zadar	(Croatia)
PF	6	Ivica Žurić	28 – 9 January 1965	2.06 m (6 ft 9 in)	KK Cibona	(Croatia)
PG	7	Vladan Alanović	25 – 3 July 1967	1.94 m (6 ft 4 in)	KK Cibona	(Croatia)
C	8	Franjo Arapović	28 – 2 June 1965	2.15 m (7 ft 1 in)	KK Cibona	(Croatia)
C	9	Žan Tabak	23 – 15 June 1970	2.13 m (7 ft 0 in)	Libertas Livorno	(Italy)
C	10	Stojko Vranković	29 – 22 January 1964	2.18 m (7 ft 2 in)	Panathinaikos	(Greece)
F	11	Danko Cvjetićanin	29 – 16 October 1963	1.98 m (6 ft 6 in)	CB Estudiantes	(Spain)
F	12	Arijan Komazec	23 – 23 January 1970	2.01 m (6 ft 7 in)	Panathinaikos	(Greece)
C	13	Dino Rađa	26 – 24 April 1967	2.12 m (6 ft 11 in)	Virtus Roma	(Italy)
C	14	Emilio Kovačić	25 – 11 January 1968	2.08 m (6 ft 10 in)	KK Cibona	(Croatia)
G	15	Veljko Mršić	22 – 13 April 1971	2.03 m (6 ft 8 in)	KK Cibona	(Croatia)

Head coach

- Mirko Novosel

Legend

- Club – describes last
  club before the tournament
- Age – describes age
  on 22 June 1993

=== France ===
France men's national basketball team roster
Players
Coaches

Pos.	No.	Name	Age – Date of birth	Height	Club
PG	4	Frédéric Forte	23 – 27 January 1970	1.92 m (6 ft 4 in)	Limoges CSP	(France)
PG	5	Olivier Allinéi	24 – 14 February 1969	1.89 m (6 ft 2 in)	Cholet Basket	(France)
PG	6	Christophe Soulé	27 – 13 October 1965	1.78 m (5 ft 10 in)	CRO Lyon Basket	(France)
F	7	Stéphane Risacher	20 – 26 August 1972	2.03 m (6 ft 8 in)	CRO Lyon Basket	(France)
F	8	Yann Bonato	21 – 4 March 1972	2.01 m (6 ft 7 in)	Olympique Antibes	(France)
C	9	Stéphane Ostrowski	31 – 17 March 1962	2.05 m (6 ft 9 in)	Olympique Antibes	(France)
C	10	Bruno Coqueran	23 – 19 June 1970	2.05 m (6 ft 9 in)	Cholet Basket	(France)
G	11	Antoine Rigaudeau	21 – 17 December 1971	2.00 m (6 ft 7 in)	Cholet Basket	(France)
PF	12	Félix Courtinard	31 – 12 July 1961	2.05 m (6 ft 9 in)	ASVEL Basket	(France)
F	13	Georges Adams	26 – 9 March 1967	1.95 m (6 ft 5 in)	Olympique Antibes	(France)
PF	14	Thierry Gadou	24 – 13 January 1969	2.05 m (6 ft 9 in)	Pau-Orthez	(France)
PF	15	Jim Bilba	25 – 13 April 1968	1.98 m (6 ft 6 in)	Limoges CSP	(France)

Head coach

- Francis Jordane

Legend

- Club – describes last
  club before the tournament
- Age – describes age
  on 22 June 1993

=== Turkey ===
Turkey men's national basketball team roster
Players
Coaches

Pos.	No.	Name	Age – Date of birth	Height	Club
PG	4	Erdal Koşan	22 – 15 May 1971	1.88 m (6 ft 2 in)	Oyak Renault	(Turkey)
F	5	Ömer Saybir	31 – 27 July 1961		Beşiktaş	(Turkey)
PF	6	Murat Konuk	21 – 18 February 1972	2.03 m (6 ft 8 in)	Tofaş S.K.	(Turkey)
PG	7	Orhun Ene	26 – 1 February 1967	1.88 m (6 ft 2 in)	Fenerbahçe	(Turkey)
F	8	Volkan Aydın	24 – 11 January 1969	1.98 m (6 ft 6 in)	Anadolu Efes S.K.	(Turkey)
G	9	Harun Erdenay	25 – 27 May 1968	1.98 m (6 ft 6 in)	İstanbul Teknik Üniversitesi B.K.	(Turkey)
G	10	Serdar Apaydın	26 – 21 October 1966	1.95 m (6 ft 5 in)	Galatasaray S.K.	(Turkey)
PG	11	Levent Topsakal	27 – 9 June 1966	1.90 m (6 ft 3 in)	Trabzonspor	(Turkey)
C	12	Ömer Büyükaycan	27 – 10 May 1966	2.08 m (6 ft 10 in)	Trabzonspor	(Turkey)
C	13	Tamer Oyguç	27 – 11 January 1966	2.10 m (6 ft 11 in)	Anadolu Efes S.K.	(Turkey)
G	14	Lütfi Arıboğan	31 – 30 September 1961	1.98 m (6 ft 6 in)	Galatasaray S.K.	(Turkey)
PF	15	Hüsnü Çakırgil	27 – 3 October 1965	1.98 m (6 ft 6 in)	Fenerbahçe	(Turkey)

Head coach

- Nur Germen

Legend

- Club – describes last
  club before the tournament
- Age – describes age
  on 22 June 1993

== Group C ==
=== Greece ===
Greece men's national basketball team roster
Players
Coaches

Pos.	No.	Name	Age – Date of birth	Height	Club
G	4	Giorgos Bosganas	25 – 20 May 1968	2.01 m (6 ft 7 in)	Panionios	(Greece)
G	5	Kostas Patavoukas	27 – 3 February 1966	1.91 m (6 ft 3 in)	A.E.K. Athens	(Greece)
PG	6	Panagiotis Giannakis	34 – 1 January 1959	1.92 m (6 ft 4 in)	Aris	(Greece)
PG	7	Lefteris Kakiousis	25 – 7 June 1968	1.89 m (6 ft 2 in)	Iraklis Thessaloniki	(Greece)
G	8	Giorgos Sigalas	22 – 31 July 1970	2.01 m (6 ft 7 in)	Olympiacos	(Greece)
G	9	Efthimis Bakatsias	25 – 14 January 1968	1.96 m (6 ft 5 in)	Pagrati	(Greece)
F	10	Nasos Galakteros	24 – 15 June 1969	2.02 m (6 ft 8 in)	A.E.K. Athens	(Greece)
C	11	Christos Tsekos	27 – 4 April 1966	2.10 m (6 ft 11 in)	P.A.O.K.	(Greece)
C	12	Giannis Papagiannis	25 – 11 May 1968	2.04 m (6 ft 8 in)	Apollon Patras	(Greece)
C	13	Panagiotis Fasoulas	30 – 12 May 1963	2.13 m (7 ft 0 in)	P.A.O.K.	(Greece)
PF	14	Nikos Oikonomou	20 – 19 February 1973	2.08 m (6 ft 10 in)	Panathinaikos	(Greece)
F	15	Fanis Christodoulou	28 – 22 May 1965	2.03 m (6 ft 8 in)	Panionios	(Greece)

Head coach

- Efthimis Kioumourtzoglou

Legend

- Club – describes last
  club before the tournament
- Age – describes age
  on 22 June 1993

=== Israel ===
Israel men's national basketball team roster
Players
Coaches

Pos.	No.	Name	Age – Date of birth	Height	Club
F	4	Nadav Henefeld	25 – 19 June 1968	2.02 m (6 ft 8 in)	Maccabi Tel Aviv B.C.	(Israel)
C	5	Ofer Fleisher	27 – 14 March 1966	2.08 m (6 ft 10 in)
F	6	Israel Elimelech	33 – 22 June 1960	1.88 m (6 ft 2 in)
C	7	Desi Barmore	33 – 22 May 1960	2.03 m (6 ft 8 in)
C	8	Shimon Amsalem	26 – 10 November 1966
PG	9	Adi Gordon	27 – 4 March 1966	1.80 m (5 ft 11 in)	Hapoel Jerusalem B.C.	(Israel)
C	10	Tomer Steinhauer	26 – 3 October 1966	2.07 m (6 ft 9 in)	Hapoel Tel Aviv B.C.	(Israel)
G	11	Doron Sheffer	21 – 12 March 1972	1.95 m (6 ft 5 in)	Hapoel Galil Elyon	(Israel)
F	12	Doron Jamchi	31 – 1 July 1961	1.98 m (6 ft 6 in)	Maccabi Tel Aviv B.C.	(Israel)
F	13	Amir Katz	22 – 15 July 1970
G	14	Lior Arditty	25 – 16 December 1967	1.92 m (6 ft 4 in)
F	15	Moti Daniel	29 – 24 July 1963	1.98 m (6 ft 6 in)

Head coach

- Zvi Sherf

Legend

- Club – describes last
  club before the tournament
- Age – describes age
  on 22 June 1993

=== Italy ===
Italy men's national basketball team roster
Players
Coaches

Pos.	No.	Name	Age – Date of birth	Height	Club
PG	4	Claudio Coldebella	24 – 25 June 1968	1.98 m (6 ft 6 in)	Virtus Bologna	(Italy)
PG	5	Ferdinando Gentile	26 – 1 January 1967	1.90 m (6 ft 3 in)	Juvecaserta Basket	(Italy)
F	6	Massimo Iacopini	29 – 10 May 1964	1.96 m (6 ft 5 in)	Benetton Treviso	(Italy)
F	7	Alberto Tonut	31 – 19 April 1962	2.02 m (6 ft 8 in)	Pallacanestro Cantù	(Italy)
F	8	Beppe Bosa	28 – 9 October 1964	2.04 m (6 ft 8 in)	Pallacanestro Cantù	(Italy)
F	9	Riccardo Pittis	24 – 18 December 1968	2.03 m (6 ft 8 in)	Olimpia Milano	(Italy)
G	10	Carlton Myers	22 – 30 March 1971	1.92 m (6 ft 4 in)	Victoria Libertas Pesaro	(Italy)
G	11	Paolo Moretti	22 – 30 June 1970	2.00 m (6 ft 7 in)	Virtus Bologna	(Italy)
PG	12	Alberto Rossini	24 – 10 June 1969	1.92 m (6 ft 4 in)	Pallacanestro Cantù	(Italy)
C	13	Alessandro Frosini	20 – 22 September 1972	2.09 m (6 ft 10 in)	Scaligera Basket Verona	(Italy)
C	14	Flavio Carera	30 – 18 January 1963	2.06 m (6 ft 9 in)	Virtus Bologna	(Italy)
C	15	Stefano Rusconi	24 – 2 October 1968	2.08 m (6 ft 10 in)	Benetton Treviso	(Italy)

Head coach

- Ettore Messina

Legend

- Club – describes last
  club before the tournament
- Age – describes age
  on 22 June 1993

=== Latvia ===
Latvia men's national basketball team roster
Players
Coaches

Pos.	No.	Name	Age – Date of birth	Height	Club
F	4	Edgars Šneps	21 – 13 April 1972	1.95 m (6 ft 5 in)	Bonus Rīga	(Latvia)
C	5	Jānis Āzacis	22 – 8 May 1971	2.12 m (6 ft 11 in)	Bonus Rīga	(Latvia)
C	6	Igors Meļņiks	30 – 14 August 1962	2.05 m (6 ft 9 in)	Montpellier Basket	(France)
F	7	Kārlis Muižnieks	29 – 25 May 1964	1.98 m (6 ft 6 in)	BK Brocēni	(Latvia)
G	8	Ivars Zankovskis	27 – 23 December 1965	1.98 m (6 ft 6 in)	BK Brocēni	(Latvia)
F	9	Ainars Bagatskis	26 – 29 March 1967	1.98 m (6 ft 6 in)	Bergen Gimle	(Norway)
G	10	Dzintars Jaunzems	26 – 22 November 1966	1.95 m (6 ft 5 in)	Princips	(Latvia)
PF	11	Ivars Liepa	28 – 4 June 1965	2.03 m (6 ft 8 in)	Ādaži/Interlatvija	(Latvia)
PG	12	Raimonds Miglinieks	22 – 16 July 1970	1.88 m (6 ft 2 in)	Riverside CC	(United States)
PG	13	Edmunds Valeiko	21 – 22 June 1972	1.88 m (6 ft 2 in)	BK Brocēni	(Latvia)
C	14	Andrejs Bondarenko	29 – 22 October 1963	2.09 m (6 ft 10 in)	Maccabi Jerusalem	(Israel)
F	15	Aigars Zeidaks	25 – 12 February 1968	2.00 m (6 ft 7 in)	BK Brocēni	(Latvia)

Head coach

- Armands Krauliņš

Legend

- Club – describes last
  club before the tournament
- Age – describes age
  on 22 June 1993

== Group D ==
=== Belgium ===
Belgium men's national basketball team roster
Players
Coaches

Pos.	No.	Name	Age – Date of birth	Height	Club
PG	4	Jacques Stas	24 – 6 February 1969	1.92 m (6 ft 4 in)	R.C. Mechelen	(Belgium)
C	5	Éric Struelens	23 – 3 November 1969	2.08 m (6 ft 10 in)	R.C. Mechelen	(Belgium)
F	6	Dirk Snyders	28 – 22 January 1965
G	7	Ronny Bayer	27 – 17 February 1966	1.85 m (6 ft 1 in)	BC Oostende	(Belgium)
C	8	Rik Samaey	32 – 30 August 1960	2.02 m (6 ft 8 in)	R.C. Mechelen	(Belgium)
PG	9	Danny Herman	27 – 3 February 1966	1.92 m (6 ft 4 in)	R.C. Mechelen	(Belgium)
F	10	Erik Cleymans	23 – 4 February 1970	1.98 m (6 ft 6 in)	Spirou Charleroi	(Belgium)
F	11	Marc Deheneffe	31 – 22 August 1961	1.99 m (6 ft 6 in)	R.C. Mechelen	(Belgium)
F	12	Herman Bruyninckx	30 – 22 December 1962		Leuven	(Belgium)
C	13	Ivan Verberckt	30 – 4 October 1962
C	14	Daniël Goethals	23 – 21 October 1969	2.06 m (6 ft 9 in)	Spirou Charleroi	(Belgium)
C	15	Dimitri Lambrecht	23 – 12 March 1970

Head coach

- Tony Van den Bosch

Legend

- Club – describes last
  club before the tournament
- Age – describes age
  on 22 June 1993

=== Estonia ===
Estonia men's national basketball team roster
Players
Coaches

Pos.	No.	Name	Age – Date of birth	Height	Club
F	4	Toomas Kandimaa	18 – 19 June 1975	1.94 m (6 ft 4 in)	Tartu	(Estonia)
G	5	Aivar Kuusmaa	26 – 12 June 1967	1.88 m (6 ft 2 in)	Rafter	(Estonia)
F	6	Erki Kivinukk	20 – 6 February 1973	1.99 m (6 ft 6 in)	Asto	(Estonia)
C	7	Ivo Saksakulm	26 – 1 December 1966	2.05 m (6 ft 9 in)	Rafter	(Estonia)
C	8	Margus Metstak	32 – 16 June 1961	2.05 m (6 ft 9 in)	Amicale	(Luxembourg)
F	9	Andrus Nagel	29 – 14 October 1963	1.96 m (6 ft 5 in)	Rafter	(Estonia)
F	10	Indrek Rumma	23 – 14 September 1969	1.98 m (6 ft 6 in)	Rafter	(Estonia)
C	11	Sergei Babenko	31 – 19 September 1961	2.08 m (6 ft 10 in)	Maccabi Ramat Gan	(Israel)
F	12	Marek Noormets	22 – 14 June 1971	2.02 m (6 ft 8 in)	Rafter	(Estonia)
C	13	Aleksandr Karavajev	33 – 24 September 1959	2.13 m (7 ft 0 in)	Rafter	(Estonia)
G	14	Gert Kullamäe	22 – 3 June 1971	1.96 m (6 ft 5 in)	Rafter	(Estonia)
PG	15	Rauno Pehka	24 – 1 January 1969	1.88 m (6 ft 2 in)	Beitar Ramat Gan	(Israel)

Head coach

- Jaak Salumets

Legend

- Club – describes last
  club before the tournament
- Age – describes age
  on 22 June 1993

=== Germany ===
Germany men's national basketball team roster
Players
Coaches

Pos.	No.	Name	Age – Date of birth	Height	Club
F	4	Moritz Kleine-Brockhoff	25 – 10 May 1968	1.98 m (6 ft 6 in)	Bayer Giants Leverkusen	(Germany)
G	5	Henrik Rödl	24 – 4 March 1969	2.00 m (6 ft 7 in)	University of North Carolina at Chapel Hill	(United States)
PG	6	Michael Koch	27 – 13 January 1966	1.90 m (6 ft 3 in)	Bayer Giants Leverkusen	(Germany)
C	7	Christian Welp	29 – 2 January 1964	2.13 m (7 ft 0 in)	Bayer Giants Leverkusen	(Germany)
C	8	Teoman Öztürk	25 – 5 December 1967	2.08 m (6 ft 10 in)	Alba Berlin	(Germany)
F	9	Henning Harnisch	25 – 15 April 1968	2.02 m (6 ft 8 in)	Bayer Giants Leverkusen	(Germany)
C	10	Gunther Behnke	30 – 19 January 1963	2.21 m (7 ft 3 in)	TuS Bramsche	(Germany)
G	11	Stephan Baeck	28 – 12 April 1965	1.95 m (6 ft 5 in)	Alba Berlin	(Germany)
PF	12	Hansi Gnad	30 – 4 June 1963	2.08 m (6 ft 10 in)	Pallacanestro Aurora Desio	(Italy)
PG	13	Kai Nürnberger	27 – 2 June 1966	1.83 m (6 ft 0 in)	TTL Bamberg	(Germany)
C	14	Jens Kujawa	28 – 28 January 1965	2.13 m (7 ft 0 in)	MHP Riesen Ludwigsburg	(Germany)
F	15	Mike Jackel	33 – 19 October 1959	1.99 m (6 ft 6 in)	TTL Bamberg	(Germany)

Head coach

- Svetislav Pešić

Legend

- Club – describes last
  club before the tournament
- Age – describes age
  on 22 June 1993

=== Slovenia ===
Slovenia men's national basketball team roster
Players
Coaches

Pos.	No.	Name	Age – Date of birth	Height	Club	Ctr.
G	4	Roman Horvat	21 – 21 November 1971	2.00 m (6 ft 7 in)	KK Union Olimpija	(Slovenia)
PF	5	Marko Tušek	17 – 17 July 1975	2.04 m (6 ft 8 in)	KK Triglav Kranj	(Slovenia)
PG	6	Jaka Daneu	22 – 3 February 1971	1.94 m (6 ft 4 in)	KK Union Olimpija	(Slovenia)
PG	7	Darko Mirt	33 – 17 April 1960	1.90 m (6 ft 3 in)	KK ZM Maribor Lumar	(Slovenia)
C	8	Primož Bačar	24 – 15 July 1968	2.08 m (6 ft 10 in)	KK Postojna	(Slovenia)
PG	9	Jure Zdovc	26 – 13 December 1966	1.98 m (6 ft 6 in)	Limoges CSP	(France)
G	10	Boštjan Leban	20 – 14 April 1973	1.96 m (6 ft 5 in)	KD Slovan	(Slovenia)
PF	11	Teoman Alibegović	26 – 11 January 1967	2.08 m (6 ft 10 in)	Fortitudo Pallacanestro Bologna	(Italy)
F	12	Boris Gorenc	19 – 3 December 1973	1.98 m (6 ft 6 in)	KK Union Olimpija	(Slovenia)
C	13	Marijan Kraljević	23 – 30 April 1970	2.12 m (6 ft 11 in)	KK Union Olimpija	(Slovenia)
C	14	Slavko Kotnik	30 – 3 November 1962	2.06 m (6 ft 9 in)	KK Union Olimpija	(Slovenia)
C	15	Žarko Đurišić	32 – 31 March 1961	2.08 m (6 ft 10 in)	KK Union Olimpija	(Slovenia)

Head coach

- Janez Drvarič

Legend

- Club – describes last
  club before the tournament
- Age – describes age
  on 22 June 1993
