= FIBA EuroBasket 1995 qualification =

Qualification for the 1995 FIBA European Championship, commonly called FIBA EuroBasket 1995 took place between 21 June 1993 and 4 June 1995. A total of twelve teams qualified for the tournament, joining hosts Greece and European Champions Germany.

== Format ==
A total of 34 teams participated. Competition consisted of three stages:

- A qualifying round that consisted of nineteen teams divided into three round-robin tournaments that took place in Wien-Austria, Zalaegerszeg-Hungary and Prievidza-Slovak Republic between 21 Jun and 27 Jun 1993.
- A semi-final round where the first and second teams from each of the three groups from the qualifying round joined another fourteen teams. All twenty teams where then divided in five round-robin groups of four teams each. This stage took place between 10 November 1993 and 16 November 1994 and competition consisted of home and away legs, taking place in each of the participating countries. The top two teams from each group qualified for EuroBasket 1995.
- An additional qualifying round where the best four third-placed teams from the semi-final round joined FR Yugoslavia, which was banned during the last edition, in a round-robin tournament that took place in Sofia-Bulgaria between 31 May and 4 Jun 1995. The top two teams qualified for EuroBasket 1995.

== Qualifying round ==
Qualified for the semi-final Round

=== Group A (Vienna, Austria) ===
Team	Pld	W	L	PF	PA	PD	Pts
Ukraine	5	5	0	472	346	+126	10
Lithuania	5	4	1	507	428	+79	9
Netherlands	5	3	2	444	404	+40	8
Iceland	5	2	3	424	443	−19	7
Austria	5	1	4	401	472	−71	6
Scotland	5	0	5	348	503	−155	5

21 Jun 1993

Boxscore

Ukraine	80–75	Lithuania
Scoring by half: 38–33, 42–42

Vienna

21 Jun 1993

Boxscore

Austria	91–68	Scotland
Scoring by half: 32–32, 59–36

Vienna

22 Jun 1993

Boxscore

Netherlands	85–93	Lithuania
Scoring by half: 37–48, 48–45

Vienna

22 Jun 1993

Boxscore

Ukraine	101–64	Scotland
Scoring by half: 44–31, 57–33

Vienna

23 Jun 1993

Boxscore

Netherlands	113–69	Scotland
Scoring by half: 50–37, 63–32

Vienna

23 Jun 1993

Boxscore

Austria	73–95	Iceland
Scoring by half: 43–38, 30–57

Vienna

24 Jun 1993

Boxscore

Lithuania	117–69	Scotland
Scoring by half: 56–33, 61–36

Vienna

24 Jun 1993

Boxscore

Iceland	70–99	Ukraine
Scoring by half: 42–50, 28–49

Vienna

25 Jun 1993

Boxscore

Iceland	78–87	Netherlands
Scoring by half: 48–46, 30–41

Vienna

25 Jun 1993

Boxscore

Austria	71–100	Ukraine
Scoring by half: 31–48, 40–52

Vienna

26 Jun 1993

Boxscore

Austria	72–93	Netherlands
Scoring by half: 42–45, 30–48

Vienna

26 Jun 1993

Boxscore

Lithuania	106–100	Iceland
Scoring by half: 42–54, 64–46

Vienna

27 Jun 1993

Boxscore

Austria	94–116	Lithuania
Scoring by half: 35–39, 59–77

Vienna

27 Jun 1993

Boxscore

Scotland	78–81	Iceland
Scoring by half: 37–43, 41–38

Vienna

27 Jun 1993

Boxscore

Ukraine	92–66	Netherlands
Scoring by half: 38–39, 54–27

Vienna

=== Group B (Zalaegerszeg, Hungary) ===
Team	Pld	W	L	PF	PA	PD	Pts	Tie
Hungary	6	5	1	524	399	+125	11	1–0
Finland	6	5	1	529	479	+50	11	0–1
Romania	6	4	2	537	481	+56	10	1–0
England	6	4	2	489	436	+53	10	0-1
Belarus	6	2	4	504	515	−11	8	
Albania	6	1	5	463	578	−115	7	
Luxembourg	6	0	6	446	604	−158	6	

Rules=1) Points; 2) Head-to-head results; 3) Points difference; 4) Points scored.

21 Jun 1993

Boxscore

Albania	77–96	England
Scoring by half: 30–50, 47–46

Zalaegerszeg

21 Jun 1993

Boxscore

Romania	84–92	Finland
Scoring by half: 52–43, 32–49

Zalaegerszeg

21 Jun 1993

Boxscore

Hungary	100–51	Luxembourg
Scoring by half: 47–29, 53–22

Zalaegerszeg

22 Jun 1993

Boxscore

England	67–70	Romania
Scoring by half: 31–40, 36–30

Zalaegerszeg

22 Jun 1993

Boxscore

Finland	81–78	Belarus
Scoring by half: 42–43, 39–35

Zalaegerszeg

22 Jun 1993

Boxscore

Hungary	110–53	Albania
Scoring by half: 49–22, 61–31

Zalaegerszeg

23 Jun 1993

Boxscore

Romania	108–93	Luxembourg
Scoring by half: 62–48, 46–45

Zalaegerszeg

23 Jun 1993

Boxscore

Belarus	80–96	England
Scoring by half: 36–42, 44–54

Zalaegerszeg

23 Jun 1993

Boxscore

Hungary	88–82	Finland
Scoring by half: 48–47, 40–35

Zalaegerszeg

24 Jun 1993

Boxscore

Albania	87–104	Romania
Scoring by half: 38–58, 49–46

Zalaegerszeg

24 Jun 1993

Boxscore

Luxembourg	65–90	Belarus
Scoring by half: 39–38, 26–52

Zalaegerszeg

24 Jun 1993

Boxscore

Hungary	64–66	England
Scoring by half: 39–29, 25–37

Zalaegerszeg

25 Jun 1993

Boxscore

Finland	89–81	Albania
Scoring by half: 61–35, 28–46

Zalaegerszeg

25 Jun 1993

Boxscore

England	97–76	Luxembourg
Scoring by half: 55–28, 42–48

Zalaegerszeg

25 Jun 1993

Boxscore

Romania	106–75	Belarus
Scoring by half: 52–31, 54–44

Zalaegerszeg

26 Jun 1993

Boxscore

Luxembourg	81–116	Finland
Scoring by half: 28–67, 53–49

Zalaegerszeg

26 Jun 1993

Boxscore

Belarus	99–72	Albania
Scoring by half: 54–40, 45–32

Zalaegerszeg

26 Jun 1993

Boxscore

Hungary	67–65	Romania
Scoring by half: 29–42, 38–23

Zalaegerszeg

27 Jun 1993

Boxscore

Albania	93–80	Luxembourg
Scoring by half: 46–41, 47–39

Zalaegerszeg

27 Jun 1993

Boxscore

England	67–69	Finland
Scoring by half: 41–36, 26–33

Zalaegerszeg

27 Jun 1993

Boxscore

Hungary	95–82	Belarus
Scoring by half: 49–54, 46–28

Zalaegerszeg

=== Group C (Prievidza, Slovak Republic) ===
Team	Pld	W	L	PF	PA	PD	Pts
Slovakia	5	5	0	429	339	+90	10
Czech Republic	5	4	1	465	360	+105	9
Poland	5	3	2	447	336	+111	8
Portugal	5	2	3	421	427	−6	7
Switzerland	5	1	4	331	437	−106	6
Cyprus	5	0	5	337	531	−194	5

22 Jun 1993

Boxscore

Poland	86–65	Portugal
Scoring by half: 44–33, 42–32

Prievidza

22 Jun 1993

Boxscore

Czech Republic	135–60	Cyprus
Scoring by half: 68–37, 67–23

Prievidza

22 Jun 1993

Boxscore

Switzerland	60–95	Slovakia
Scoring by half: 23–52, 37–43

Prievidza

23 Jun 1993

Boxscore

Cyprus	63–123	Poland
Scoring by half: 31–71, 32–52

Prievidza

23 Jun 1993

Boxscore

Switzerland	71–94	Portugal
Scoring by half: 35–39, 36–55

Prievidza

23 Jun 1993

Boxscore

Slovakia	80–74	Czech Republic
Scoring by half: 40–36, 40–38

Prievidza
Attendance: 1,000

24 Jun 1993

Boxscore

Poland	90–54	Switzerland
Scoring by half: 41–25, 49–29

Prievidza

24 Jun 1993

Boxscore

Cyprus	64–78	Slovakia
Scoring by half: 34–42, 30–36

Prievidza

24 Jun 1993

Boxscore

Portugal	74–91	Czech Republic
Scoring by half: 35–50, 39–41

Prievidza

25 Jun 1993

Boxscore

Portugal	117–77	Cyprus
Scoring by half: 58–26, 59–51

Prievidza

25 Jun 1993

Boxscore

Czech Republic	85–68	Switzerland
Scoring by half: 36–33, 49–35

Prievidza

25 Jun 1993

Boxscore

Slovakia	74–70	Poland
Scoring by half: 45–30, 29–40

Prievidza
Attendance: 1,000

26 Jun 1993

Boxscore

Switzerland	78–73	Cyprus
Scoring by half: 34–37, 44–36

Prievidza

26 Jun 1993

Boxscore

Poland	78–80	Czech Republic
Scoring by half: 41–46, 37–34

Prievidza

26 Jun 1993

Boxscore

Slovakia	102–71	Portugal
Scoring by half: 56–41, 46–30

Prievidza

== Semi-final round ==
Qualified for EuroBasket 1995

=== Group A ===
Team	Pld	W	L	PF	PA	PD	Pts	Tie
Croatia	6	5	1	518	431	+87	11	
Sweden	6	3	3	455	448	+7	9	
Belgium	6	2	4	421	471	−50	8	1-1, +5
Slovakia	6	2	4	447	491	−44	8	1-1 -5

Rules=1) Points; 2) Head-to-head results; 3) Points difference; 4) Points scored.

10 Nov 1993
17:00

Boxscore

Slovakia	90–92	Croatia
Scoring by half: 35–45, 55–47
Pts: Mičuda 24; Rebs: Mičuda 5 Asts: Jakabovič, Bunák, Krämer 1		Pts: Perasović 32; Rebs: Tabak 11; Asts: Perasović, Alanović 4

Prievidza
Attendance: 1,000
Referees: Michail Grigoriev (RUS), Richard Führer (AUT)

11 Nov 1993
15:00

Boxscore

Belgium	56–62	Sweden
Scoring by half: 28–27, 28–35
Pts: Snyders 15; Rebs: Samaey 9 Asts: Jaumin, Van Impe, Samaey, Cleymans 2		Pts: Evers, Sahlström 16; Rebs: Sahlström 13; Asts: Evers, Gehrke 2

Braine
Attendance: 1,600

13 Nov 1993
14:00

Boxscore

Sweden	91–65	Slovakia
Scoring by half: 50–37, 41–28
Pts: Sahlström 23; Rebs: Sahlström 18; Asts: Håkanson 4		Pts: Uhnák 22; Rebs: Matický 8 Asts: Jakabovič, Bunák, Matický, Krämer, Mičuda 1

Gothenburg

13 Nov 1993
17:45

Boxscore

Croatia	92–58	Belgium
Scoring by half: 45–24, 47–34
Pts: Perasović 22; Rebs: Tabak 9 Asts: Perasović, Marić 4		Pts: Snyders 16; Rebs: Samaey 7 Asts: Samaey 4

Dvorana Mladosti, Rijeka
Attendance: 3,000

17 Nov 1993
18:00

Boxscore

Slovakia	73–71	Belgium
Scoring by half: 34–41, 39–30
Pts: Faith 13; Rebs: Matický, Mičuda 6 Asts: Jakabovič 2		Pts: Weatherspoon 17; Rebs: Snyders, Samaey 6 Asts: Samaey 1

Prievidza

17 Nov 1993
19:00

Boxscore

Sweden	94–71	Croatia
Scoring by half: 40–37, 54–34
Pts: Gaddefors 22; Rebs: Gehrke 7 Asts: Evers 5		Pts: Perasović 33; Rebs: Šarlija 5 Asts: Alanović 4

Gothenburg
Attendance: 1,818

9 Nov 1994
17:45

Boxscore

Croatia	83–60	Slovakia
Scoring by half: 44–37, 39–23
Pts: Komazec 22; Rebs: S. Vranković, Popović 8 Asts: Perasović, Komazec 3		Pts: Petruška 22; Rebs: Matický 6 Asts: Petruška, Matický 1

Dvorana G.O.C., Čakovec
Attendance: 1,500
Referees: Pierluigi D'Este (ITA), György Váradi (HUN)

9 Nov 1994
19:00

Boxscore

Sweden	74–87	Belgium
Scoring by half: 36–47, 38–40
Pts: Gaddefors 17; Rebs: Sahlström 6 Asts: Gaddefors, Diarra, Lundahl 1		Pts: Deheneffe 18; Rebs: Struelens 9 Asts: Cleymans 2

Fyrishov Arena, Uppsala
Attendance: 1,600
Referees: William Jones (WAL), Michail Grigoriev (RUS)

12 Nov 1994
15:15

Boxscore

Slovakia	81–69	Sweden
Scoring by half: 42–38, 39–31

Prievidza
Attendance: 1,500

12 Nov 1994
20:00

Boxscore

Belgium	64–92	Croatia
Scoring by half: 24–49, 40–43
Pts: Struelens 26; Rebs: Struelens 11; Asts: Stas 3		Pts: Komazec 19; Rebs: S. Vranković 13

Salle Edgard Hismans, Quaregnon
Attendance: 2,500
Referees: Ralph Umlandt (GER), Vicente Sanchís (ESP)

15 Nov 1994
18:30

Boxscore

Croatia	88–65	Sweden
Scoring by half: 48–38, 40–27
Pts: Komazec 31; Rebs: S. Vranković 12; Asts: Marić, S. Vranković 4		Pts: Markus 23; Rebs: Markus 11; Asts: P. Larsson 5

Dvorana Mladosti, Rijeka
Attendance: 4,000
Referees: Stefano Cazzaro (ITA), Bruno Vauthier (FRA)

16 Nov 1994
20:00

Boxscore

Belgium	85–78	Slovakia
Scoring by half: 40–36, 45–42
Pts: Goethals 20; Rebs: Goethals 11; Asts: Herman 6		Pts: Lovík 21; Rebs: Matický 8

Hasselt
Attendance: 2,000
Referees: José Araújo (POR), René Leegwater (NED)

=== Group B ===
Team	Pld	W	L	PF	PA	PD	Pts	Tie
Slovenia	6	5	1	563	463	+100	11	1–1, +1
Lithuania	6	5	1	535	465	+70	11	1–1, -1
Estonia	6	2	4	479	539	−60	8	
Latvia	6	0	6	493	603	−110	6	

Rules=1) Points; 2) Head-to-head results; 3) Points difference; 4) Points scored.

10 Nov 1993
18:30

Boxscore

Latvia	78–100	Slovenia
Scoring by half: 43–57, 35–43
Pts: Muižnieks 20; Rebs: Muižnieks, Liepa, Bondarenko 5 Asts: Liepa, Bondarenko 2		Pts: Hauptman 26; Rebs: Alibegović 8 Asts: Alibegović 4

Arena of TTT Riga, Riga

10 Nov 1993
19:00

Boxscore

Lithuania	97–74	Estonia
Scoring by half: 53–28, 44–46

Vilnius
Attendance: 5,000

12 Nov 1993
18:00

Boxscore

Estonia	96–88	Latvia
Scoring by half: 44–47, 52–41
Pts: Kullamäe 27; Rebs: Saksakulm 14; Asts: Kullamäe 5		Pts: Muižnieks 28; Rebs: Zeidaks 13; Asts: Valeiko 2

Tallinn
Attendance: 2,000

13 Nov 1993
17:00

Boxscore

Slovenia	85–81 (OT)	Lithuania
Scoring by half: 49–35, 25–39 Overtime: 11–7
Pts: Hauptman 18; Rebs: Đurišić 13; Asts: Zdovc, Alibegović 2		Pts: Sabonis 26; Rebs: Krapikas, Sabonis, Einikis 5 Asts: Chomičius, Kurtinaitis 4

Ljubljana
Attendance: 3,500

17 Nov 1993
19:00

Boxscore

Lithuania	108–65	Latvia
Scoring by half: 55–30, 53–35
Pts: Einikis 22; Rebs: Sabonis 22; Asts: Sabonis 11		Pts: Jaunzems 18; Rebs: Jaunzems, Skrastiņš 6 Asts: Āzacis, Valneris, Jaunzems 2

Kaunas
Attendance: 4,100

17 Nov 1993
20:15

Boxscore

Slovenia	105–72	Estonia
Scoring by half: 50–30, 55–42
Pts: Alibegović 21; Rebs: Kotnik 6 Asts: Tovornik 3		Pts: Kullamäe 19; Rebs: Karavajev 4 Asts: Rumma 2

Arena of ZKD Kograd, Maribor
Attendance: 3,000

9 Nov 1994
19:00

Boxscore

Estonia	65–67	Lithuania
Scoring by half: 32–20, 33–47
Pts: Kullamäe 32; Rebs: Metstak 11; Asts: Rumma 2		Pts: Sabonis, Karnišovas 20; Rebs: Sabonis 13; Asts: Sabonis 7

Tallinn
Attendance: 1,500
Referees: Zbigniew Szpilewski (POL), Peter George (GER)

9 Nov 1994
20:15

Boxscore

Slovenia	104–73	Latvia
Scoring by half: 45–26, 59–47
Pts: Kotnik 27; Rebs: Kotnik 12; Asts: Gorenc 2		Pts: Višņevičs 22; Rebs: Liepa, Zeidaks, Višņevičs 3 Asts: Valeiko, Liepa, Zeidaks 1

Slovenske Konjice Hall, Slovenske Konjice
Attendance: 1,300
Referees: Andreas Roth (AUT), Alojz Ceizel (SVK)

12 Nov 1994
18:00

Boxscore

Lithuania	88–85	Slovenia
Scoring by half: 42–46, 46–39
Pts: Karnišovas 29; Rebs: Karnišovas 5 Asts: Kurtinaitis, Karnišovas 5		Pts: Kotnik 37; Rebs: Kotnik 10; Asts: Mirt 3

Vilnius
Attendance: 5,100
Referees: Carl Jungebrand (FIBA), Petr Sudek (SVK)

12 Nov 1994
18:30

Boxscore

Latvia	98–101	Estonia
Scoring by half: 40–44, 58–57
Pts: Zeidaks 36; Rebs: Zeidaks 11; Asts: Štelmahers, Bagatskis, Valeiko, Višņevičs 2		Pts: Metstak 36; Rebs: Metstak, Noormets 10; Asts: Kullamäe 7

Arena of TTT Riga, Riga
Referees: Zdeněk Šantrůček (CZE), Pekka Saros (FIN)

15 Nov 1994
19:00

Boxscore

Estonia	71–84	Slovenia
Scoring by half: 38–39, 33–45
Pts: Kullamäe 24; Rebs: Saksakulm 7 Asts: Pehka 3		Pts: Kotnik 22; Rebs: Kotnik 13; Asts: Jeklin, Mirt, Tovornik, Gorenc, Kotnik 1

Tallinn
Referees: Jozef Jančovič (SVK), Lars Klaar (SWE)

16 Nov 1994
18:30

Boxscore

Latvia	91–94	Lithuania
Scoring by half: 39–56, 52–38
Pts: Zeidaks 23; Rebs: Zeidaks 7 Asts: Štelmahers 4		Pts: Štombergas 23; Rebs: Ilgauskas 13; Asts: Lukminas 4

Referees: Leszek Rakoczy (POL), Rikard Johansson (SWE)

=== Group C ===
Team	Pld	W	L	PF	PA	PD	Pts
Russia	6	5	1	517	422	+95	11
Finland	6	4	2	551	588	−37	10
Bosnia and Herzegovina	6	3	3	499	500	−1	9
Ukraine	6	0	6	417	474	−57	6

10 Nov 1993
18:30

Boxscore

Finland	98–96	Russia
Scoring by half: 50–51, 48–45
Pts: Klinga 23; Rebs: Markkanen 8 Asts: Klinga 5		Pts: Bazarevich 31; Rebs: Nosov 12; Asts: Karasev, Bazarevich, Babkov 3

Helsinki

10 Nov 1993
20:00

Boxscore

Bosnia and Herzegovina	87–83	Ukraine
Scoring by half: 44–48, 43–35
Pts: Bilalović 31; Rebs: Avdić 9 Asts: Avdić 2		Pts: Zhuravlov 19; Rebs: Okunskyy 7 Asts: Podkovyrov 7

Paderborn

13 Nov 1993
17:00

Boxscore

Russia	97–77	Bosnia and Herzegovina
Scoring by half: 45–28, 52–49
Pts: Karasev 21; Rebs: Kisurin 11; Asts: Bazarevich 5		Pts: Avdić 18; Rebs: Lerić 6 Asts: Begović 6

Moscow
Attendance: 2,000

13 Nov 1993
18:30

Boxscore

Ukraine	101–111	Finland
Scoring by half: 53–50, 48–61
Pts: Pudzyrey, Uspenskyy 23; Rebs: Uspenskyy 9 Asts: Pudzyrey, Podkovyrov 3		Pts: Klinga 32; Rebs: Pehkonen 10; Asts: Klinga 2

Arena of SC "Nikolaev", Nikolaev
Attendance: 2,000

17 Nov 1993
18:30

Boxscore

Finland	75–73	Bosnia and Herzegovina
Scoring by half: 37–39, 38–34
Pts: Pehkonen 18; Rebs: Markkanen 10; Asts: Klinga 8		Pts: Bilalović 17; Rebs: Avdić 10; Asts: Avdić 3

Helsinki
Attendance: 1,700

17 Nov 1993
18:30

Boxscore

Ukraine	71–81	Russia
Scoring by half: 42–31, 29–50
Pts: Savchenko, Okunskyy 14; Rebs: Uspenskyy 8 Asts: Pudzyrey 4		Pts: Bazarevich 21; Rebs: Panov 12; Asts: Bazarevich 5

Arena of SC "Nikolaev", Nikolaev
Attendance: 2,600

9 Nov 1994
19:00

Boxscore

Russia	129–89	Finland
Scoring by half: 53–37, 76–52
Pts: Babkov 25; Rebs: Fetisov 9 Asts: Karasev 11		Pts: Markkanen, Klinga 15; Rebs: Markkanen 8 Asts: Klinga 8

Moscow
Attendance: 2,000
Referees: Miodrag Ličina (SRB), Anguel Ivanov (BUL)

9 Nov 1994
19:00

Boxscore

Ukraine	70–78	Bosnia and Herzegovina
Scoring by half: 38–37, 32–41
Pts: Lokhmanchuk 15; Rebs: Lokhmanchuk 14; Asts: Prikhodko 3		Pts: Marković Zorić 22; Rebs: Mutapčić, Alihodžić 5 Asts: Firić, Mutapčić 5

Palace of Sports, Kyiv
Attendance: 5,500
Referees: Pascal Dorizon (FRA), Ladislav Janáč (SVK)

12 Nov 1994
15:30

Boxscore

Finland	97–92	Ukraine
Scoring by half: 55–41, 42–51
Pts: Klinga 25; Rebs: Pehkonen 7 Asts: Klinga 6		Pts: Pudzyrey 19; Rebs: Lokhmanchuk 8 Asts: Pudzyrey 5

Helsinki
Attendance: 1,600
Referees: Boris Schmidt (GER), Trevor Pountain (GBR)

12 Nov 1994
20:30

Boxscore

Bosnia and Herzegovina	87–94 (OT)	Russia
Scoring by half: 43–46, 35–32 Overtime: 9–16
Pts: Marković Zorić 22; Rebs: Mutapčić, Alihodžić 6 Asts: Mutapčić 6		Pts: Babkov 25; Rebs: Kisurin 11; Asts: Panov 4

Berlin
Attendance: 3,000
Referees: Gennaro Colucci (ITA), Víctor Mas (ESP)

16 Nov 1994
16:30

Boxscore

Bosnia and Herzegovina	97–81	Finland
Scoring by half: 48–34, 49–47
Pts: Halimić 22; Rebs: Primorac 9 Asts: Firić, Alihodžić 3		Pts: Klinga 29; Rebs: Markkanen 6 Asts: Niiranen 4

Berlin
Attendance: 2,400
Referees: Karel Bruna (CZE), Wiesław Zych (POL)

16 Nov 1994

Russia	20–0	Ukraine

Kazan

Ukraine didn't play this game and Russia received a forfait (20–0)

=== Group D ===
Team	Pld	W	L	PF	PA	PD	Pts	Tie
Spain	6	5	1	507	447	+60	11	1–1, +5
Israel	6	5	1	528	483	+45	11	1–1, -5
Turkey	6	1	5	474	500	−26	7	1–1, +5
Czech Republic	6	1	5	486	565	−79	7	1–1, -5

Rules=1) Points; 2) Head-to-head results; 3) Points difference; 4) Points scored.

10 Nov 1993
20:30

Boxscore

Spain	107–67	Czech Republic
Scoring by half: 51–33, 56–34
Pts: Jiménez 16; Rebs: Martínez 12; Asts: Laso Biurrun 5		Pts: Svoboda 17; Rebs: Okáč 9 Asts: Treml, Kameník 2

Attendance: 5,000

10 Nov 1993
21:00

Boxscore

Turkey	81–87	Israel
Scoring by half: 31–45, 50–42
Pts: Erdenay 23; Rebs: Oyguç 8 Asts: Topsakal 3		Pts: Gordon 21; Rebs: Steinhauer 11; Asts: Gordon 6

İzmir
Attendance: 5,000

13 Nov 1993
20:30

Boxscore

Israel	106–86	Czech Republic
Scoring by half: 51–46, 55–40
Pts: Jones, Fleisher 24; Rebs: Fleisher 12; Asts: Gordon 8		Pts: Treml 23; Rebs: Svoboda 5 Asts: Hrubý, Kameník, Kovář 1

Sport Palace, Tel Aviv
Attendance: 4,000

13 Nov 1993
20:30

Boxscore

Spain	74–65	Turkey
Scoring by half: 46–45, 28–20
Pts: Martín Espina 20; Rebs: Martín Espina 14; Asts: Jofresa Prats 5		Pts: Erdenay 19; Rebs: Konuk, Oyguç 5 Asts: Topsakal 2

Málaga
Attendance: 5,000

17 Nov 1993
17:00

Boxscore

Czech Republic	96–80	Turkey
Scoring by half: 53–43, 43–37

Prague

17 Nov 1993
20:30

Boxscore

Israel	69–79	Spain
Scoring by half: 35–40, 34–39
Pts: Henefeld, Jones 14; Rebs: Fleisher 8 Asts: Gordon 3		Pts: Vecina 17; Rebs: Vecina, Martínez 6 Asts: Laso Biurrun, Vecina, Cargol Costa 2

Tel Aviv
Attendance: 6,500

9 Nov 1994
16:30

Boxscore

Czech Republic	78–80	Spain
Scoring by half: 36–43, 42–37
Pts: Treml, Svoboda 16; Rebs: Svoboda 6 Asts: Hrubý 7		Pts: Fernández Fernández 16; Rebs: Martínez 5 Asts: Abad Viciano 2

Nový Jičín
Referees: Danko Radić (CRO), Efim Resser (GER)

9 Nov 1994
20:30

Boxscore

Israel	83–71	Turkey
Scoring by half: 40–37, 43–34
Pts: Steinhauer 21; Rebs: Henefeld, Steinhauer 8 Asts: Henefeld 7		Pts: Ene 24; Rebs: Büyükaycan 8 Asts: Ene 6

Sport Palace, Tel Aviv
Attendance: 9,000
Referees: Kamen Toshev (BUL), Tiziano Zancanella (ITA)

12 Nov 1994
17:15

Boxscore

Czech Republic	88–100	Israel
Scoring by half: 45–44, 43–56
Pts: Bečka 14; Rebs: Okáč 8 Asts: Hrubý 7		Pts: Jamchi 18; Rebs: Fleisher 5 Asts: Jamchi 6

Nový Jičín
Referees: Konrad Tomczyk (POL), Tomislav Jovančić (SRB)

12 Nov 1994
18:00

Boxscore

Turkey	85–89	Spain
Scoring by half: 25–39, 60–50
Pts: Erdenay 25; Rebs: Büyükaycan 8 Asts: Oyguç 4		Pts: Martínez 21; Rebs: Martínez 9 Asts: Rodríguez Marín 4

Istanbul
Attendance: 3,500
Referees: Philippe Leemann (SUI), Alan Richardson (ENG)

16 Nov 1994
18:00

Boxscore

Turkey	92–71	Czech Republic
Scoring by half: 47–31, 45–40
Pts: Aydın, Erdenay 23; Rebs: Erdenay, Büyükaycan, Oyguç 8 Asts: Aydın, Erdenay 6		Pts: Hrubý 20; Rebs: Svoboda 8 Asts: Treml, Okáč 3

Ankara
Attendance: 7,000
Referees: Ion Olaru (ROU), Anguel Ivanov (BUL)

16 Nov 1994
20:15

Boxscore

Spain	78–83	Israel
Scoring by half: 31–41, 47–42
Pts: Martínez 25; Rebs: Martínez 7 Asts: Rodríguez Marín 3		Pts: Gordon 25; Rebs: Leaf, Fleisher 5 Asts: Henefeld, Gordon 3

Huesca
Attendance: 5,000
Referees: Philippe Mailhabiau (FRA), Rui Valente (POR)

=== Group E ===
Team	Pld	W	L	PF	PA	PD	Pts
France	6	5	1	472	408	+64	11
Italy	6	4	2	484	418	+66	10
Bulgaria	6	3	3	424	469	−45	9
Hungary	6	0	6	405	490	−85	6

10 Nov 1993
15:45

Boxscore

Italy	92–58	Bulgaria
Scoring by half: 42–31, 50–27

Cagliari
Attendance: 4,850

10 Nov 1993
18:00

Boxscore

Hungary	67–68	France
Scoring by half: 28–34, 39–34

Arena of ZTE KK, Zalaegerszeg
Attendance: 4,000

13 Nov 1993
16:30

Boxscore

Bulgaria	78–65	Hungary
Scoring by half: 27–30, 51–35

Arena of BC Compakt, Dimitrovgrad
Attendance: 1,200

13 Nov 1993
20:00

Boxscore

France	78–77	Italy
Scoring by half: 34–41, 44–36
Pts: Ostrowski 20; Rebs: Ostrowski 9 Asts: Rigaudeau, Gadou 5		Pts: Gentile 24; Rebs: Fučka 9 Asts: Gentile 5

Palais des Sports de Pau, Pau
Attendance: 7,200

17 Nov 1993
18:00

Boxscore

Hungary	70–90	Italy
Scoring by half: 37–47, 33–43
Pts: Farkas 18; Rebs: Dávid 5 Asts: Zsebe, Halm 2		Pts: Gentile, Fučka 16; Rebs: Pittis, Fučka 8 Asts: Gentile, Pittis, Myers 2

Budapest
Attendance: 1,500

17 Nov 1993
18:00

Boxscore

Bulgaria	68–63	France
Scoring by half: 33–27, 35–36

Yambol
Attendance: 2,500

9 Nov 1994
18:00

Boxscore

Bulgaria	65–70	Italy
Scoring by half: 36–36, 29–34
Pts: Mladenov 23; Rebs: Natov 11; Asts: Mladenov 4		Pts: Conti 19; Rebs: Conti 17; Asts: Gentile 2

Sofia
Attendance: 2,000
Referees: Tihomir Bubalo (SRB), Nikolaos Pitsilkas (GRE)

9 Nov 1994
20:00

Boxscore

France	89–51	Hungary
Scoring by half: 42–23, 47–28
Pts: Rigaudeau, Ostrowski 16; Rebs: Occansey, Bilba 5 Asts: Forte 6		Pts: Dávid 18; Rebs: Dávid 6 Asts: Zsebe 4

Palais des Sports, Caen
Attendance: 3,000
Referees: Juan Carlos Mitjana (ESP), Michel Zegwaard (NED)

12 Nov 1994
17:00

Boxscore

Italy	74–77 (OT)	France
Scoring by half: 30–39, 36–27 Overtime: 8–11
Pts: Conti 18; Rebs: Conti 12; Asts: Coldebella, Myers, Frosini 2		Pts: Ostrowski 18; Rebs: Butter, Bilba 4 Asts: Forte 3

Reggio Calabria
Attendance: 7,000
Referees: Konstantinos Koromilas (GRE), Reuven Virovnik (ISR)

12 Nov 1994
17:00

Boxscore

Hungary	82–84	Bulgaria
Scoring by half: 39–44, 43–40

Zalaegerszeg
Attendance: 1,000
Referees: Ivan Zachara (CZE), Davorin Nakić (CRO)

16 Nov 1994
16:00

Boxscore

Italy	81–70	Hungary
Scoring by half: 49–40, 32–30
Pts: Frosini 17; Rebs: Conti 7 Asts: Coldebella, Myers, Moretti 1		Pts: Dávid 21; Rebs: Dávid 3 Asts: Farkas, Dávid, Zsebe, Boros, Bodrogi 1

Benevento
Attendance: 4,500
Referees: Aleš Kamnikar (SLO), Fatih Dalay (TUR)

16 Nov 1994
20:00

Boxscore

France	97–71	Bulgaria
Scoring by half: 46–39, 51–32
Pts: Ostrowski 25; Rebs: Bilba 14; Asts: Forte, Rigaudeau 9		Pts: Mladenov 36; Rebs: Natov 7 Asts: Dimitrov, Stankov 4

La Meilleraie, Cholet
Attendance: 3,500
Referees: Armand De Keyser (BEL), Iztok Rems (SLO)

== Additional qualifying round ==
Qualified for EuroBasket 1995

=== Group X (Sofia, Bulgaria) ===
Team	Pld	W	L	PF	PA	PD	Pts	Tie
Yugoslavia	4	4	0	286	216	+70	8	
Turkey	4	3	1	316	309	+7	7	
Bulgaria	4	1	3	334	333	+1	5	1–1, +9
Bosnia and Herzegovina	4	1	3	223	243	−20	5	1–1, +8
Estonia	4	1	3	310	368	−58	5	1–1, -17

Rules=1) Points; 2) Head-to-head results; 3) Points difference; 4) Points scored.

31 May 1995
18:15

Boxscore

Yugoslavia	93–87 (OT)	Bulgaria
Scoring by half: 49–53, 34–30 Overtime: 10–4
Pts: Obradović 16; Rebs: Rebrača, Savić, Tomašević 4 Asts: Paspalj, Đorđević 2		Pts: Mladenov 42; Rebs: Natov 14; Asts: Mladenov, Antov 2

Sofia

31 May 1995
20:00

Boxscore

Turkey	81–73	Bosnia and Herzegovina
Scoring by half: 44–38, 37–35
Pts: Aydın, Erdenay 19; Rebs: Oyguç 8 Asts: Ene, Erdenay 2		Pts: Marković Zorić 16; Rebs: Alihodžić 13; Asts: Marković Zorić, Firić 2

Sofia

1 Jun 1995
18:15

Boxscore

Estonia	75–91	Turkey
Scoring by half: 40–43, 35–48
Pts: Babenko 23; Rebs: Babenko 18; Asts: Kullamäe 5		Pts: Erdenay 24; Rebs: Oyguç 13; Asts: Ene, Topsakal 3

Sofia

1 Jun 1995

Bosnia and Herzegovina	0–20	Yugoslavia

Sofia

Bosnia-Herzegovina didn't play this game and Yugoslavia received a forfait (0-20)

2 Jun 1995
16:00

Boxscore

Bulgaria	60–72	Bosnia and Herzegovina
Scoring by half: 34–32, 26–40
Pts: Antov 26; Rebs: Natov 7 Asts: Mladenov 6		Pts: Marković Zorić 26; Rebs: Alihodžić 7 Asts: Marković Zorić, Bećiragić, Alihodžić 1

Sofia

2 Jun 1995
18:00

Boxscore

Yugoslavia	89–64	Estonia
Scoring by half: 43–29, 46–35
Pts: Danilović 18; Rebs: Stevanović, Koturović 8 Asts: Đorđević 3		Pts: Pehka 23; Rebs: Rumma 4 Asts: Kullamäe 5

Sofia

3 Jun 1995
18:00

Boxscore

Estonia	89–110	Bulgaria
Scoring by half: 45–53, 44–57
Pts: Metstak 22; Rebs: Metstak 7 Asts: Kullamäe, Pehka 7		Pts: Mladenov 29; Rebs: Natov, Minchev 9 Asts: Mladenov 7

Sofia

3 Jun 1995
20:00

Boxscore

Turkey	65–84	Yugoslavia
Scoring by half: 28–53, 37–31
Pts: Evliyaoğlu, Ene 11; Rebs: Türkcan 5 Asts: Ene, Yıldırım 2		Pts: Danilović 23; Rebs: Tomašević 7 Asts: Bodiroga 5

Sofia

4 Jun 1995
16:15

Boxscore

Bosnia and Herzegovina	78–82	Estonia
Scoring by half: 40–47, 38–35
Pts: Primorac 18; Rebs: Mutapčić 7 Asts: Firić 4		Pts: Kullamäe 24; Rebs: Metstak 12; Asts: Nagel 2

Sofia

4 Jun 1995
18:15

Boxscore

Bulgaria	77–79	Turkey
Scoring by half: 43–27, 34–52
Pts: Mladenov 28; Rebs: Natov 14; Asts: Mladenov 3		Pts: Büyükaycan 33; Rebs: Topsakal 3 Asts: Büyükaycan 2

Sofia
