= EuroBasket 1995 =

International basketball event

Ευρωμπάσκετ 1995

Tournament details
- Host country: Greece
- City: Athens
- Dates: 21 June – 2 July
- Teams: 14
- Venue: 1 (in 1 host city)

Final positions
- Champions: Yugoslavia (1st title)
- Runners-up: Lithuania
- Third place: Croatia
- Fourth place: Greece

Tournament statistics
- MVP: (Lithuania) Šarūnas Marčiulionis
- Top scorer: (Lithuania) Šarūnas Marčiulionis (22.5 points per game)

The 1995 FIBA European Championship, commonly called FIBA EuroBasket 1995, was the 29th FIBA EuroBasket regional basketball championship held by FIBA Europe, which also served as Europe qualifier for the 1996 Summer Olympics, giving a berth to each of the top four teams in the final standings. It was held in Greece between 21 June and 2 July 1995. Fourteen national teams entered the event under the auspices of FIBA Europe, the sport's regional governing body. The city of Athens hosted the tournament. Serbia and Montenegro (then under the name of FR Yugoslavia) won its first FIBA European title, by defeating Lithuania by the score of 96–90 in the final. Lithuania's Šarūnas Marčiulionis was voted the tournament's MVP. This edition of the FIBA EuroBasket tournament saw the successful return of the Lithuania national team to the competition, since its last triumph in 1939.

The tournament's official anthem was "Wings of Tomorrow" by Finnish band Stratovarius.

== Venues ==
All games were played at the O.A.C.A. Olympic Indoor Hall in Athens.

EuroBasket 1995 is located in Greece	O.A.C.A. Olympic Indoor Hall; Capacity: 18,500; Opened in 1995

== Qualification ==
Competition	Date	Vacancies	Qualified
Host nation	–	1	Greece
Champions from EuroBasket 1993	22 June – 4 July 1993	1	Germany
Qualified through Qualifying Round	21 June 1993 – 16 November 1994	10	Croatia; Finland; France; Israel; Italy; Lithuania; Russia; Slovenia; Spain; Sweden
Qualified through Additional Qualifying Round	31 May – 4 June 1995	2	Turkey; Yugoslavia

== Format ==
- The teams were split in two groups of seven teams each. The top four teams from each group advance to the knockout quarterfinals.
- The winners in the semifinals compete for the European Championship, while the losers from the semifinals play a consolation game for the third place.
- The losers in the quarterfinals compete in a separate bracket to define 5th through 8th place in the final standings.

== Preliminary round ==
Times given below are in Eastern European Summer Time (UTC+3).

Qualified for the quarterfinals

=== Group A ===
Team	Pld	W	L	PF	PA	PD	Pts
Yugoslavia	6	6	0	490	411	+79	12
Lithuania	6	5	1	513	442	+71	11
Greece	6	4	2	448	430	+18	10
Italy	6	3	3	438	433	+5	9
Israel	6	2	4	419	417	+2	8
Germany	6	1	5	448	488	−40	7
Sweden	6	0	6	393	528	−135	6

21 June
13:30

Boxscore

Germany	82–96	Lithuania
Scoring by half: 45–54, 37–42
Pts: Koch 21		Pts: Karnišovas 35

O.A.C.A. Olympic Indoor Hall, Athens
Referees: George Toliver (USA), Philippe Mailhabiau (FRA)

21 June
17:30

Boxscore

Israel	71–73	Italy
Scoring by half: 39–37, 32–36
Pts: Henefeld 16; Rebs: Henefeld 7 Asts: Goodes 4		Pts: Rusconi 17; Rebs: Rusconi 10; Asts: Pittis, Rusconi 3

O.A.C.A. Olympic Indoor Hall, Athens
Referees: Carl Jungebrand (FIN), Necip Kapanlı (TUR)

21 June
20:00

Boxscore

Greece	80–84 (OT)	Yugoslavia
Scoring by half: 43–34, 29–38 Overtime: 8–12
Pts: Rentzias 17; Rebs: Christodoulou, Fasoulas 8 Asts: Patavoukas, Giannakis 3		Pts: Bodiroga 22; Rebs: Paspalj 9 Asts: Divac 4

O.A.C.A. Olympic Indoor Hall, Athens
Referees: Alan Richardson (ENG), Vicente Sanchís (ESP)

22 June
13:30

Boxscore

Italy	68–67	Germany
Scoring by half: 36–34, 32–33
Pts: Esposito 23; Rebs: Rusconi 8 Asts: Esposito 3		Pts: Koch 22; Rebs: Gnad 10; Asts: Nürnberger, Rödl 4

O.A.C.A. Olympic Indoor Hall, Athens
Referees: Juan Antonio Figueroa (PUR), Mikhail Grigoriev (RUS)

22 June
20:00

Boxscore

Lithuania	89–73	Greece
Scoring by half: 38–33, 51–40
Pts: Marčiulionis 28; Rebs: Sabonis 23; Asts: Marčiulionis 5		Pts: Christodoulou 19; Rebs: Angelidis, Christodoulou, Sigalas 4 Asts: Giannakis 5

O.A.C.A. Olympic Indoor Hall, Athens
Referees: Danko Radić (CRO), Carl Jungebrand (FIN)

22 June
22:00

Boxscore

Sweden	62–87	Israel
Scoring by half: 34–42, 28–45
Pts: Sahlström 15; Rebs: Sahlström 9 Asts: Evers 4		Pts: Jamchi 22; Rebs: Fleisher, Sheffer 5 Asts: Goodes 6

O.A.C.A. Olympic Indoor Hall, Athens
Referees: Wiesław Zych (POL), Aleš Kamnikar (SLO)

23 June
11:30

Boxscore

Yugoslavia	70–61	Lithuania
Scoring by half: 35–29, 35–32
Pts: Đorđević 18; Rebs: Bodiroga 11; Asts: Đorđević 5		Pts: Marčiulionis 22; Rebs: Sabonis 14; Asts: Sabonis 2

O.A.C.A. Olympic Indoor Hall, Athens
Referees: Vicente Sanchís (ESP), Juan Antonio Figueroa (PUR)

23 June
13:30

Boxscore

Germany	81–71	Sweden
Scoring by half: 39–33, 42–38
Pts: Koch 20; Rebs: Welp 8 Asts: Rödl 5		Pts: Sahlström 23; Rebs: Sahlström 11; Asts: Håkanson 4

O.A.C.A. Olympic Indoor Hall, Athens
Referees: Danko Radić (CRO), George Toliver (USA)

23 June
20:00

Boxscore

Greece	67–61	Italy
Scoring by half: 33–37, 34–24
Pts: Christodoulou 19; Rebs: Fasoulas 11; Asts: Christodoulou 4		Pts: Esposito 15; Rebs: Pittis 10; Asts: Esposito 4

O.A.C.A. Olympic Indoor Hall, Athens
Referees: Wiesław Zych (POL), Mikhail Grigoriev (RUS)

24 June
11:30

Boxscore

Italy	74–87	Yugoslavia
Scoring by half: 37–49, 37–38
Pts: Fučka 19; Rebs: Fučka 10; Asts: Gentile 4		Pts: Đorđević 22; Rebs: Divac 6 Asts: Đorđević 5

O.A.C.A. Olympic Indoor Hall, Athens
Referees: Carl Jungebrand (FIN), George Toliver (USA)

24 June
13:30

Boxscore

Israel	78–60	Germany
Scoring by half: 40–20, 38–40
Pts: Jamchi 20; Rebs: Fleisher 10; Asts: Sheffer 6		Pts: Koch 22; Rebs: Welp 7 Asts: Nürnberger 6

O.A.C.A. Olympic Indoor Hall, Athens
Referees: Alan Richardson (ENG), Aleš Kamnikar (SLO)

24 June
22:00

Boxscore

Sweden	68–86	Greece
Scoring by half: 30–42, 38–44
Pts: Larsson 17; Rebs: Blom 10; Asts: Larsson 2		Pts: Angelidis 19; Rebs: Rentzias 11; Asts: Kakiousis 4

O.A.C.A. Olympic Indoor Hall, Athens
Referees: Philippe Mailhabiau (FRA), Juan Antonio Figueroa (PUR)

26 June
18:00

Boxscore

Yugoslavia	85–58	Sweden
Scoring by half: 42–30, 43–28
Pts: Danilović 16; Rebs: Divac 10; Asts: Divac 5		Pts: Marcus, Sahlström 14; Rebs: Marcus 6 Asts: Andersson 5

O.A.C.A. Olympic Indoor Hall, Athens
Referees: Philippe Mailhabiau (FRA), Mikhail Grigoriev (RUS)

26 June
20:00

Boxscore

Greece	59–49	Israel
Scoring by half: 29–25, 30–24
Pts: Sigalas 20; Rebs: Fasoulas 8 Asts: Sigalas 4		Pts: Jamchi 17; Rebs: Henefeld 13; Asts: Sheffer 3

O.A.C.A. Olympic Indoor Hall, Athens
Referees: Alan Richardson (ENG), Carl Jungebrand (FIN)

26 June
22:00

Boxscore

Lithuania	80–69	Italy
Scoring by half: 42–39, 38–30
Pts: Marčiulionis 32; Rebs: Sabonis 19; Asts: Marčiulionis 8		Pts: Magnifico 18; Rebs: Rusconi 8 Asts: Esposito 5

O.A.C.A. Olympic Indoor Hall, Athens
Referees: Vicente Sanchís (ESP), Danko Radić (CRO)

27 June
13:30

Boxscore

Israel	59–72	Yugoslavia
Scoring by half: 25–35, 34–37
Pts: Goodes 13; Rebs: Goodes 5 Asts: Sheffer 3		Pts: Danilović 21; Rebs: Bodiroga 8 Asts: Paspalj 3

O.A.C.A. Olympic Indoor Hall, Athens
Referees: George Toliver (USA), Necip Kapanlı (TUR)

27 June
18:00

Boxscore

Sweden	73–96	Lithuania
Scoring by half: 40–46, 33–50
Pts: Larsson 21; Rebs: Sahlström 5 Asts: Håkanson 3		Pts: Karnišovas 24; Rebs: Sabonis 12; Asts: Kurtinaitis 5

O.A.C.A. Olympic Indoor Hall, Athens
Referees: Carl Jungebrand (FIN), Necip Kapanlı (TUR)

27 June
22:00

Boxscore

Germany	79–83	Greece
Scoring by half: 43–45, 36–38
Pts: Koch 20; Rebs: Gnad 7 Asts: Rödl 6		Pts: Sigalas 17; Rebs: Christodoulou 11; Asts: Giannakis 8

O.A.C.A. Olympic Indoor Hall, Athens
Referees: Mikhail Grigoriev (RUS), Philippe Mailhabiau (FRA)

28 June
11:30

Boxscore

Italy	93–61	Sweden
Scoring by half: 46–38, 47–33
Pts: Esposito 26; Rebs: Conti 8 Asts: 4 Players 2		Pts: Gaddefors 13; Rebs: Sahlström 7 Asts: Håkanson, Larsson 2

O.A.C.A. Olympic Indoor Hall, Athens
Referees: Danko Radić (CRO), Necip Kapanlı (TUR)

28 June
13:30

Boxscore

Yugoslavia	92–79	Germany
Scoring by half: 55–27, 37–52
Pts: Danilović 17; Rebs: Rebrača 10; Asts: Bodiroga 6		Pts: Koch 24; Rebs: Gnad 12; Asts: Rödl 7

O.A.C.A. Olympic Indoor Hall, Athens
Referees: Reuven Virovnik (ISR), Carl Jungebrand (FIN)

28 June
20:00

Boxscore

Lithuania	91–75	Israel
Scoring by half: 45–29, 46–46
Pts: Karnišovas 24; Rebs: Karnišovas 13; Asts: Marčiulionis, Štombergas 5		Pts: Sheffer 16; Rebs: Balul, Henefeld 5 Asts: Goodes 6

O.A.C.A. Olympic Indoor Hall, Athens
Referees: Vicente Sanchís (ESP), Philippe Mailhabiau (FRA)

=== Group B ===
Team	Pld	W	L	PF	PA	PD	Pts	Tie
Croatia	6	6	0	534	464	+70	12	
Spain	6	4	2	499	473	+26	10	1-1, +5
Russia	6	4	2	577	508	+69	10	1-1, +4
France	6	4	2	496	466	+30	10	1-1, -9
Slovenia	6	2	4	505	506	−1	8	
Turkey	6	1	5	462	539	−77	7	
Finland	6	0	6	457	574	−117	6	

21 June
9:30

Boxscore

Russia	126–74	Finland
Scoring by half: 62–33, 64–41
Pts: Babkov 19; Rebs: Nosov 10; Asts: Bazarevich 6		Pts: Kuisma 13; Rebs: Markkanen, Möttölä 6 Asts: 4 Players 1

O.A.C.A. Olympic Indoor Hall, Athens
Referees: Peter George (GER), Tomislav Jovančić (YUG)

21 June
11:30

Boxscore

Slovenia	68–89	France
Scoring by half: 38–49, 30–40
Pts: Zdovc 18; Rebs: Kotnik 7 Asts: Zdovc 3		Pts: Bonato 28; Rebs: Bilba 12; Asts: Forte, Rigaudeau 3

O.A.C.A. Olympic Indoor Hall, Athens
Referees: Reuven Virovnik (ISR), Lars Klaar (SWE)

21 June
22:00

Boxscore

Spain	85–70	Turkey
Scoring by half: 39–29, 46–41
Pts: Herreros 28; Rebs: Orenga 11; Asts: Herreros 5		Pts: Erdenay 26; Rebs: Oyguç 7 Asts: Topsakal 6

O.A.C.A. Olympic Indoor Hall, Athens
Referees: Juan Antonio Figueroa (PUR), Romualdas Brazauskas (LTU)

22 June
9:30

Boxscore

Croatia	91–83	Slovenia
Scoring by half: 47–38, 44–45
Pts: Kukoč 20; Rebs: Vranković 10; Asts: 4 Players 3		Pts: Alibegović 20; Rebs: Kraljević 5 Asts: Milič 4

O.A.C.A. Olympic Indoor Hall, Athens
Referees: Stefano Cazzaro (ITA), Peter George (GER)

22 June
11:30

Boxscore

France	65–85	Russia
Scoring by half: 27–36, 38–49
Pts: Bilba, Ostrowski 13; Rebs: Ostrowski 8 Asts: Forte 4		Pts: Babkov, Fetisov 16; Rebs: Fetisov 11; Asts: Bazarevich 4

O.A.C.A. Olympic Indoor Hall, Athens
Referees: Nikolaos Pitsilkas (GRE), George Toliver (USA)

22 June
18:00

Boxscore

Finland	74–87	Spain
Scoring by half: 31–36, 43–51
Pts: Klinga 22; Rebs: Kuisma, Möttölä 6 Asts: Klinga, Lehtonen 4		Pts: Fernández 17; Rebs: Smith 15; Asts: Laso 4

O.A.C.A. Olympic Indoor Hall, Athens
Referees: Reuven Virovnik (ISR), Lars Klaar (SWE)

23 June
9:30

Boxscore

Turkey	81–79	Finland
Scoring by half: 38–44, 43–35
Pts: Kutluay 27; Rebs: Konuk 8 Asts: Ene 6		Pts: Kuisma 17; Rebs: Pehkonen 6 Asts: Klinga 4

O.A.C.A. Olympic Indoor Hall, Athens
Referees: Alan Richardson (ENG), Romualdas Brazauskas (LTU)

23 June
18:00

Boxscore

Spain	75–86	France
Scoring by half: 34–47, 41–39
Pts: Galilea 15; Rebs: Galilea 15; Asts: Laso 7		Pts: Bonato 23; Rebs: Bilba 8 Asts: Forte 4

O.A.C.A. Olympic Indoor Hall, Athens
Referees: Stefano Cazzaro (ITA), Tomislav Jovančić (YUG)

23 June
22:00

Boxscore

Russia	94–100 (OT)	Croatia
Scoring by half: 39–44, 42–37 Overtime: 13–19
Pts: Babkov 27; Rebs: Mikhaylov 7 Asts: Bazarevich 7		Pts: Komazec 30; Rebs: Vranković 9 Asts: Kukoč 5

O.A.C.A. Olympic Indoor Hall, Athens
Referees: Reuven Virovnik (ISR), Nikolaos Pitsilkas (GRE)

24 June
9:30

Boxscore

France	90–76	Turkey
Scoring by half: 47–49, 43–27
Pts: Rigaudeau 23; Rebs: Bilba 13; Asts: Forte 6		Pts: Kutluay 18; Rebs: Büyükaycan 7 Asts: 3 Players 2

O.A.C.A. Olympic Indoor Hall, Athens
Referees: Peter George (GER), Reuven Virovnik (ISR)

24 June
18:00

Boxscore

Slovenia	82–92	Russia
Scoring by half: 44–50, 38–42
Pts: Alibegović 25; Rebs: Kotnik 12; Asts: Zdovc 7		Pts: Bazarevich 35; Rebs: Fetisov 7 Asts: Karasev 3

O.A.C.A. Olympic Indoor Hall, Athens
Referees: Stefano Cazzaro (ITA), Lars Klaar (SWE)

24 June
20:00

Boxscore

Croatia	80–70	Spain
Scoring by half: 37–35, 43–35
Pts: Komazec 25; Rebs: Vranković 7 Asts: Kukoč 6		Pts: Herreros 19; Rebs: Smith 6 Asts: Laso 5

O.A.C.A. Olympic Indoor Hall, Athens
Referees: Wiesław Zych (POL), Romualdas Brazauskas (LTU)

26 June
9:30

Boxscore

Turkey	68–90	Croatia
Scoring by half: 31–48, 37–42
Pts: Türkcan 13; Rebs: Türkcan 9 Asts: 4 Players 2		Pts: Perasović 23; Rebs: Vranković 10; Asts: Kukoč 10

O.A.C.A. Olympic Indoor Hall, Athens
Referees: Peter George (GER), Lars Klaar (SWE)

26 June
11:30

Boxscore

Finland	81–94	France
Scoring by half: 38–50, 43–44
Pts: Pehkonen 13; Rebs: Markkanen 7 Asts: Markkanen 5		Pts: Bonato 23; Rebs: Ostrowski 7 Asts: Sonko 7

O.A.C.A. Olympic Indoor Hall, Athens
Referees: Tomislav Jovančić (YUG), Stefano Cazzaro (ITA)

26 June
13:30

Boxscore

Spain	88–85	Slovenia
Scoring by half: 49–40, 39–45
Pts: Herreros 30; Rebs: Smith 7 Asts: Laso 8		Pts: Kotnik 17; Rebs: Milič 7 Asts: Milič 7

O.A.C.A. Olympic Indoor Hall, Athens
Referees: Nikolaos Pitsilkas (GRE), George Toliver (USA)

27 June
9:30

Boxscore

Slovenia	93–74	Turkey
Scoring by half: 40–36, 53–38
Pts: Alibegović 33; Rebs: Alibegović 9 Asts: Alibegović, Zdovc 4		Pts: Türkcan 21; Rebs: Türkcan 15; Asts: 3 Players 1

O.A.C.A. Olympic Indoor Hall, Athens
Referees: Alan Richardson (ENG), Reuven Virovnik (ISR)

27 June
11:30

Boxscore

Croatia	92–77	Finland
Scoring by half: 50–34, 42–43
Pts: Rađa 27; Rebs: Kukoč 12; Asts: Kukoč 11		Pts: Kuisma 16; Rebs: Markkanen 8 Asts: Klinga, Lehtonen 3

O.A.C.A. Olympic Indoor Hall, Athens
Referees: Vicente Sanchís (ESP), Romualdas Brazauskas (LTU)

27 June
20:00

Boxscore

Russia	78–94	Spain
Scoring by half: 44–47, 34–47
Pts: Fetisov 19; Rebs: Fetisov 12; Asts: Karasev 4		Pts: Martínez 27; Rebs: Martínez 12; Asts: Galilea 9

O.A.C.A. Olympic Indoor Hall, Athens
Referees: Tomislav Jovančić (YUG), Juan Antonio Figueroa (PUR)

28 June
9:30

Boxscore

Finland	72–94	Slovenia
Scoring by half: 33–43, 39–51
Pts: Kuisma 17; Rebs: Markkanen 7 Asts: Klinga, Larkio 2		Pts: Kotnik 20; Rebs: Kotnik 12; Asts: Zdovc 3

O.A.C.A. Olympic Indoor Hall, Athens
Referees: Peter George (GER), Juan Antonio Figueroa (PUR)

28 June
18:00

Boxscore

Turkey	93–102	Russia
Scoring by half: 46–46, 47–56
Pts: Büyükaycan 20; Rebs: Türkcan 14; Asts: Apaydın, Yıldırım 2		Pts: Babkov 25; Rebs: Fetisov 13; Asts: Fetisov, Karasev 6

O.A.C.A. Olympic Indoor Hall, Athens
Referees: Stefano Cazzaro (ITA), Lars Klaar (SWE)

28 June
22:00

Boxscore

France	72–81	Croatia
Scoring by half: 40–40, 32–41
Pts: Bonato 20; Rebs: Bilba 10; Asts: Forte 4		Pts: Komazec 28; Rebs: Rađa 9 Asts: Komazec, Kukoč 5

O.A.C.A. Olympic Indoor Hall, Athens
Referees: Nikolaos Pitsilkas (GRE), George Toliver (USA)

== Knockout stage ==
=== Championship bracket ===
Quarter-finals
30 June – 22:00
France	86
Yugoslavia	104
30 June – 20:00
Greece	66
Spain	64
30 June – 18:00
Italy	61
Croatia	71
30 June – 16:00
Russia	71
Lithuania	82

Semi-finals
1 July – 20:00
Yugoslavia	60
Greece	52
1 July – 22:00
Croatia	80
Lithuania	90

Final
2 July – 22:00
Yugoslavia	96
Lithuania	90
Third place
2 July – 20:00
Greece	68
Croatia	73

==== Quarterfinals ====
Winners qualified for the 1996 Summer Olympics.

30 June
16:00

Boxscore

Russia	71–82	Lithuania
Scoring by half: 33–44, 38–38
Pts: Babkov 25; Rebs: Fetisov, Mikhaylov 8 Asts: Mikhaylov 3		Pts: Sabonis 33; Rebs: Sabonis 14; Asts: Lukminas 3

O.A.C.A. Olympic Indoor Hall, Athens
Referees: Alan Richardson (ENG), George Toliver (USA)

30 June
18:00

Boxscore

Italy	61–71	Croatia
Scoring by half: 29–31, 32–40
Pts: Fučka 16; Rebs: Rusconi 9 Asts: Pittis 3		Pts: Kukoč 24; Rebs: Vranković 16; Asts: Kukoč 3

O.A.C.A. Olympic Indoor Hall, Athens
Referees: Nikolaos Pitsilkas (GRE), Juan Antonio Figueroa (PUR)

30 June
20:00

Boxscore

Greece	66–64	Spain
Scoring by half: 30–33, 36–31
Pts: Fasoulas 20; Rebs: Christodoulou, Fasoulas 10; Asts: Christodoulou 6		Pts: Herreros 15; Rebs: Reyes 12; Asts: Laso 5

O.A.C.A. Olympic Indoor Hall, Athens
Referees: Wiesław Zych (POL), Danko Radić (CRO)

30 June
22:00

Boxscore

France	86–104	Yugoslavia
Scoring by half: 35–59, 51–45
Pts: Bonato 38; Rebs: T. Gadou 7 Asts: Rigaudeau 6		Pts: Danilović 24; Rebs: 3 Players 3 Asts: Đorđević 6

O.A.C.A. Olympic Indoor Hall, Athens
Referees: Stefano Cazzaro (ITA), Romualdas Brazauskas (LTU)

==== Semifinals ====
1 July
20:00

Boxscore

Yugoslavia	60–52	Greece
Scoring by half: 27–24, 33–28
Pts: Danilović 19; Rebs: Savić 11; Asts: 5 Players 1		Pts: Fasoulas 14; Rebs: Fasoulas 11; Asts: Angelidis 5

O.A.C.A. Olympic Indoor Hall, Athens
Referees: George Toliver (USA), Juan Antonio Figueroa (PUR)

1 July
22:00

Boxscore

Croatia	80–90	Lithuania
Scoring by half: 31–38, 49–52
Pts: Rađa 25; Rebs: Vranković 10; Asts: Komazec 5		Pts: Marčiulionis 27; Rebs: Sabonis 17; Asts: Marčiulionis 4

O.A.C.A. Olympic Indoor Hall, Athens
Referees: Stefano Cazzaro (ITA), Philippe Mailhabiau (FRA)

==== Third place ====
2 July
20:00

Boxscore

Greece	68–73	Croatia
Scoring by half: 39–35, 29–38
Pts: Christodoulou 13; Rebs: Fasoulas 14; Asts: Christodoulou 4		Pts: Mršić 20; Rebs: Vranković 11; Asts: Marić 5

O.A.C.A. Olympic Indoor Hall, Athens
Referees: Alan Richardson (ENG), Romualdas Brazauskas (LTU)

==== Final ====
From the start, the two teams matched up evenly, as Lithuania's Šarūnas Marčiulionis and Arvydas Sabonis and Yugoslavia's Aleksandar Đorđević and Predrag Danilović exchanged points. At halftime, the Lithuanians were ahead by a point, 49–48. Vlade Divac got a technical foul early in first half. In second half, an American referee George Toliver signaled Lithuanian center Arvydas Sabonis for a technical foul, which led to Lithuanian protestations.

After a few more fouls signaled by the referee, one offensive and one technical against Lithuania, the Lithuanian team refused to return to the court after timeout. After a few minutes, Aleksandar Đorđević, who was the leading scorer with 41 points (made 9 three-pointers out of 12 attempted), tried to convince Marčiulionis to continue playing.

The persuasions were successful, and five Lithuanians returned to the court. Yugoslavia was leading 93–89 with 2 minutes remaining in the game. Players Arvydas Sabonis and Rimas Kurtinaitis could not return to the court, as they fouled out before the Lithuanian refusal to play. And although the Lithuanian team tried their hardest to catch up with the Yugoslavian team, they eventually lost 96–90.

After the Yugoslavs' victory, the Greek crowd that cheered against Yugoslavia throughout the final further showed their displeasure during the winners ceremony by chanting "Lithuania is the champion!". Furthermore, there was controversy during the medal ceremony as right before the winning Yugoslav team were about to receive their gold medals, the third-placed Croatian team, in an unprecedented move, stepped down from the medal podium and walked off the court in an unprecedented display of bad sportsmanship, due to the civil war in former Yugoslavia.

2 July
22:00

Boxscore

Yugoslavia	96–90	Lithuania
Scoring by half: 48–49, 48–41
Pts: Đorđević 41; Rebs: Divac 9 Asts: three players 3		Pts: Marčiulionis 32; Rebs: Sabonis 8 Asts: Marčiulionis 6

O.A.C.A. Olympic Indoor Hall, Athens
Attendance: 20,000
Referees: George Toliver (USA), Nikolaos Pitsilkas (GRE)

=== 5th to 8th place ===
Classification round
1 July – 16:00
Italy	80
Russia	70
1 July – 18:00
France	74
Spain	75

Fifth place
2 July – 16:00
Italy	82
Spain	75
Seventh place
2 July – 18:00
Russia	108
France	89

1 July
16:00

Boxscore

Italy	80–70	Russia
Scoring by half: 36–43, 44–27
Pts: Abbio 19; Rebs: Frosini 11; Asts: Abbio, Esposito 2		Pts: Bazarevich 22; Rebs: Fetisov 11; Asts: Bazarevich 4

O.A.C.A. Olympic Indoor Hall, Athens
Referees: Vicente Sanchís (ESP), Tomislav Jovančić (YUG)

1 July
18:00

Boxscore

France	74–75	Spain
Scoring by half: 37–38, 37–37
Pts: Rigaudeau 17; Rebs: T. Gadou 9 Asts: T. Gadou, Rigaudeau 4		Pts: Fernández 19; Rebs: Martín Espina 11; Asts: Galilea 2

O.A.C.A. Olympic Indoor Hall, Athens
Referees: Alan Richardson (ENG), Nikolaos Pitsilkas (GRE)

2 July
16:00

Boxscore

Russia	108–89	France
Scoring by half: 61–38, 47–51
Pts: Panov 20; Rebs: Fetisov 11; Asts: Karasev 3		Pts: Bonato 20; Rebs: Ostrowski 9 Asts: Sonko 9

O.A.C.A. Olympic Indoor Hall, Athens
Referees: Wiesław Zych (POL), Danko Radić (CRO)

2 July
18:00

Boxscore

Italy	82–75	Spain
Scoring by half: 42–34, 40–41
Pts: Pittis 21; Rebs: Fučka 8 Asts: Esposito 4		Pts: Herreros 22; Rebs: Reyes 16; Asts: Herreros, Rodríguez 3

O.A.C.A. Olympic Indoor Hall, Athens
Referees: Juan Antonio Figueroa (PUR), Tomislav Jovančić (YUG)

== Statistical leaders ==
=== Individual Tournament Highs ===
Points

Pos.	Name	PPG
1	(Lithuania) Šarūnas Marčiulionis	23.7
2	(Lithuania) Arvydas Sabonis	22.0
3	(France) Yann Bonato	21.7
4	(Germany) Michael Koch	21.6
4	(Croatia) Arijan Komazec	20.3
6	(Slovenia) Teoman Alibegović	20.2
7	(Russia) Sergei Bazarevich	18.4
8	(Spain) Alberto Herreros	18.3
9	(Lithuania) Artūras Karnišovas	17.9
10	(Federal Republic of Yugoslavia) Predrag Danilović	17.4

Rebounds

Pos.	Name	RPG
1	(Lithuania) Arvydas Sabonis	15.3
2	(Russia) Andrei Fetisov	9.7
3	(Croatia) Stojko Vranković	9.1
4	(Greece) Panagiotis Fasoulas	8.6
4	(Spain) Mike Smith	8.6
6	(Germany) Hansi Gnad	8.0
7	(France) Jim Bilba	7.7
8	(Croatia) Toni Kukoč	7.6
9	(Turkey) Mirsad Türkcan	7.5
10	(Slovenia) Slavko Kotnik	7.3

Assists

Pos.	Name	APG
1	(Croatia) Toni Kukoč	5.3
2	(Germany) Henrik Rödl	5.0
3	(Lithuania) Šarūnas Marčiulionis	4.1
4	(Spain) Pablo Laso	3.7
4	(Israel) Guy Goodes	3.7
6	(France) Frédéric Forte	3.4
7	(Federal Republic of Yugoslavia) Aleksandar Đorđević	3.3
7	(Greece) Panagiotis Giannakis	3.3
7	(Israel) Doron Sheffer	3.3
7	(Slovenia) Jure Zdovc	3.3

Steals

Pos.	Name	SPG
1	(Israel) Nadav Henefeld	2.7
2	(Greece) Giorgos Sigalas	2.2
2	(Israel) Doron Sheffer	2.2
3	(France) Jim Bilba	1.9
3	(Croatia) Arijan Komazec	1.9
5	(Israel) Mordechai Daniel	1.8
5	(Slovenia) Jure Zdovc	1.8
7	(Greece) Fanis Christodoulou	1.7
7	(Italy) Riccardo Pittis	1.7
10	(France) Frédéric Forte	1.6

Minutes

Pos.	Name	MPG
1	(Germany) Michael Koch	34.8
2	(Lithuania) Šarūnas Marčiulionis	34.3
3	(Israel) Nadav Henefeld	34.2
4	(Lithuania) Artūras Karnišovas	34.0
4	(Lithuania) Arvydas Sabonis	34.0
6	(Germany) Henrik Rödl	33.4
7	(Croatia) Toni Kukoč	33.3
7	(Slovenia) Slavko Kotnik	33.3
9	(Slovenia) Jure Zdovc	32.8
10	(Croatia) Arijan Komazec	32.6

=== Individual Game Highs ===
Department	Name	Total	Opponent
Points	(Federal Republic of Yugoslavia) Aleksandar Đorđević	41	Lithuania
Rebounds	(Lithuania) Arvydas Sabonis	23	Greece
Assists	(Croatia) Toni Kukoč	11	Finland
Steals	(Greece) Panagiotis Fasoulas	6	Yugoslavia
Turnovers	(Lithuania) Šarūnas Marčiulionis (France) Stéphane Ostrowski (Croatia) Stojko Vranković	7	Yugoslavia; Turkey; Greece

=== Team Tournament Highs ===
Offensive PPG

Pos.	Name	PPG
1	Russia	91.8
2	Lithuania	86.1
3	Croatia	84.2
3	Slovenia	84.2
5	Yugoslavia	83.3

Rebounds

Pos.	Name	RPG
1	Russia	34.8
2	Croatia	34.6
2	Greece	34.4
4	Lithuania	33.4
5	Italy	31.9

Assists

Pos.	Name	APG
1	Germany	15.4
2	France	15.0
3	Croatia	14.9
4	Yugoslavia	14.3
5	Greece	14.0

Steals

Pos.	Name	SPG
1	Israel	11.5
2	France	9.0
3	Italy	8.9
4	Russia	8.6
5	Greece	7.3

=== Team Game highs ===
Department	Name	Total	Opponent
Points	Russia	126	Finland
Rebounds	Russia	54	Finland
Assists	Croatia; Yugoslavia	23	Turkey; Germany
Steals	France	15	Finland
Field goal percentage	Spain	66.7% (34/51)	Slovenia
3-point field goal percentage	Spain	68.8% (11/16)	Russia
Free throw percentage	Finland	100% (7/7)	Croatia
Turnovers	Yugoslavia	26	Israel

== Awards ==
1995 FIBA EuroBasket champions

Yugoslavia
1st title

1995 FIBA EuroBasket MVP: Šarūnas Marčiulionis ( Lithuania)

All-Tournament Team
(Lithuania) Šarūnas Marčiulionis (MVP)
(Croatia) Toni Kukoč
(Greece) Fanis Christodoulou
(Federal Republic of Yugoslavia) Vlade Divac
(Lithuania) Arvydas Sabonis

== Final standings ==
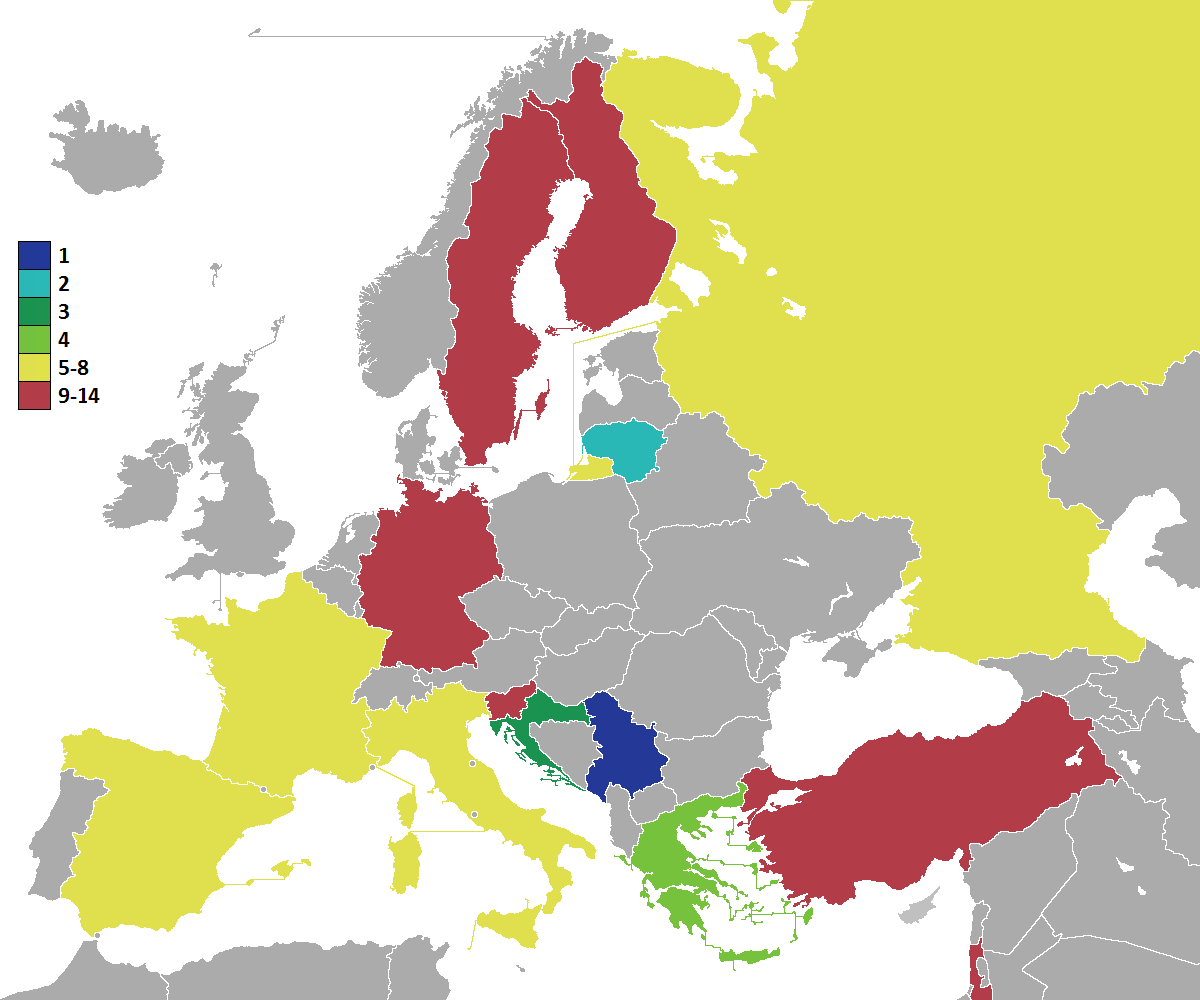
Results

Qualified for the 1996 Olympic Tournament

Rank	Team	Record
1st place, gold medalist(s)	Yugoslavia	9–0
2nd place, silver medalist(s)	Lithuania	7–2
3rd place, bronze medalist(s)	Croatia	8–1
4	Greece	5–4
5	Italy	5–4
6	Spain	5–4
7	Russia	5–4
8	France	4–5
9	Israel	2–4
10	Slovenia	2–4
11	Germany	1–5
12	Turkey	1–5
13	Finland	0–6
14	Sweden	0–6

1st	2nd	3rd	4th
Yugoslavia Dejan Bodiroga; Predrag Danilović; Saša Obradović; Zoran Sretenović; Žarko Paspalj; Miroslav Berić; Aleksandar Đorđević; Željko Rebrača; Vlade Divac; Zoran Savić; Dejan Tomašević; Dejan Koturović	Lithuania Valdemaras Chomičius; Mindaugas Timinskas; Saulius Štombergas; Arūnas Visockas; Darius Lukminas; Gintaras Krapikas; Rimas Kurtinaitis; Arvydas Sabonis; Artūras Karnišovas; Šarūnas Marčiulionis; Gintaras Einikis; Gvidonas Markevičius	Croatia Josip Vranković; Velimir Perasović; Arijan Komazec; Toni Kukoč; Vladan Alanović; Ivica Marić; Ivica Žurić; Stojko Vranković; Alan Gregov; Veljko Mršić; Dino Rađa; Davor Pejčinović	Greece Efthimis Bakatsias; Kostas Patavoukas; Panagiotis Giannakis; Tzanis Stavrakopoulos; Giorgos Sigalas; Lefteris Kakiousis; Fragiskos Alvertis; Nikos Oikonomou; Dinos Angelidis; Panagiotis Fasoulas; Efthimios Rentzias; Fanis Christodoulou
