= Federico Ramiro =

Spanish basketball player

Federico Ramiro Mor (born 12 December 1962 in Madrid, Spain) is a retired basketball player. He played 5 for the Spain national team.

== Clubs ==
- 1979–81: Real Madrid
- 1981–85: CB OAR Ferrol
- 1985–87: Cajamadrid
- 1987–88: Saski Baskonia
- 1988–91: CB Málaga
- 1991–94: CB Valladolid
- 1994–96: CB Salamanca

== Awards ==
- Euroleague (1): 1979-80
- Liga ACB (1): 1979-80
- Copa del Rey (1): 1979-80
- Intercontinental Cup (1): 1981
