= Ivica Marić =

Croatian basketball player

Ivica Marić (born April 16, 1967 in Zenica, Yugoslavia) is a Croatian former professional basketball player. He was a 1.82 m point guard with good court vision.

== Professional career ==
Marić led the 2000–01 Euroleague in assists (5.9 per game) and steals (3.7 per game) whilst playing for KK Zadar.

== International career ==
Marić was a member of the Croatian national team that won the bronze medal in the 1995 Eurobasket.
