= Maccabi Jerusalem =

Maccabi Jerusalem may refer to:

- Maccabi Jerusalem B.C., an Israeli basketball team
- Maccabi Jerusalem F.C., an Israeli former football club
