= Michael Koch (basketball) =

German basketball player and coach

Bayer Giants Leverkusen
- Title: Head coach
- League: ProA

Personal information
- Born: January 13, 1966 (age 60) Lich, Hesse, West Germany
- Listed height: 6 ft 2.75 in (1.90 m)
- Listed weight: 190 lb (86 kg)

Career information
- Playing career: 1983–2004
- Position: Point guard / shooting guard
- Coaching career: 2004–present

Career history

Playing
- 1983–1987: MTV Gießen
- 1987–1991: Steiner Bayreuth
- 1991–1996: Bayer 04 Leverkusen
- 1996–2001: Panathinaikos
- 2001–2002: Maroussi
- 2002–2003: Ionikos Neas Filadelfeias
- 2003–2004: Dragons Rhöndorf

Coaching
- 2004–2005: Dragons Rhöndorf (Under-16)
- 2005–2013: Telekom Baskets Bonn
- 2013–2016: Medi Bayreuth
- 2018–2019: AEL Limassol
- 2023–2024: Bayer Giants Leverkusen (assistant)
- 2024–present: Bayer Giants Leverkusen

Career highlights
- As player: FIBA Intercontinental Cup champion (1996); EuroLeague champion (2000); 4× Greek League champion (1998–2001); 6× German League champion (1989, 1992–1996); 4× German Cup winner (1988, 1989, 1993, 1995); German League MVP (1995); As head coach: ProB Coach of the Year (2025)

Michael Koch (born January 13, 1966) is a German professional basketball coach and former player. He is currently the head coach of Bayer Giants Leverkusen of the ProA. Prior to his stint in Bayreuth, he was the head coach of Telekom Baskets Bonn from 2005 to 2013.

== Playing career ==
Koch played in Germany for MTV 1846 Giessen, Steiner Bayreuth, and TSV Bayer 04 Leverkusen. As a player of Bayreuth he won the German League championship (1989) and 2 German Cups (1988, 1989). Playing for Leverkusen Koch won 5 German League championships (1992, 1993, 1994, 1995, 1996) and 2 German cups (1993, 1995). He was the German League MVP in 1995.

In 1996, he moved to Panathinaikos. Playing for Panathinaikos, Koch won 4 Greek League championships (1998, 1999, 2000, 2001), the EuroLeague (2000), and the 1996 FIBA Intercontinental Cup. He was also a FIBA SuproLeague finalist (2001), and FIBA Saporta Cup semifinalist (1997–98).

In 2001, he moved to Maroussi Telestet and became FIBA Korać Cup semifinalist (2001–02). The next year he moved to Ionikos Neas Filadelfeias.

== National team career ==
While playing for the senior men's German national basketball team, Koch won the gold medal at the EuroBasket 1993 at Germany. He also played at the 1987 EuroBasket, the 1995 EuroBasket, the 1986 FIBA World Championship, and the 1994 FIBA World Championship. He played 140 times for Germany between 1985 and 1998.
