= Rafael Vecina =

Spanish basketball player

Rafael Vecina Aceijas
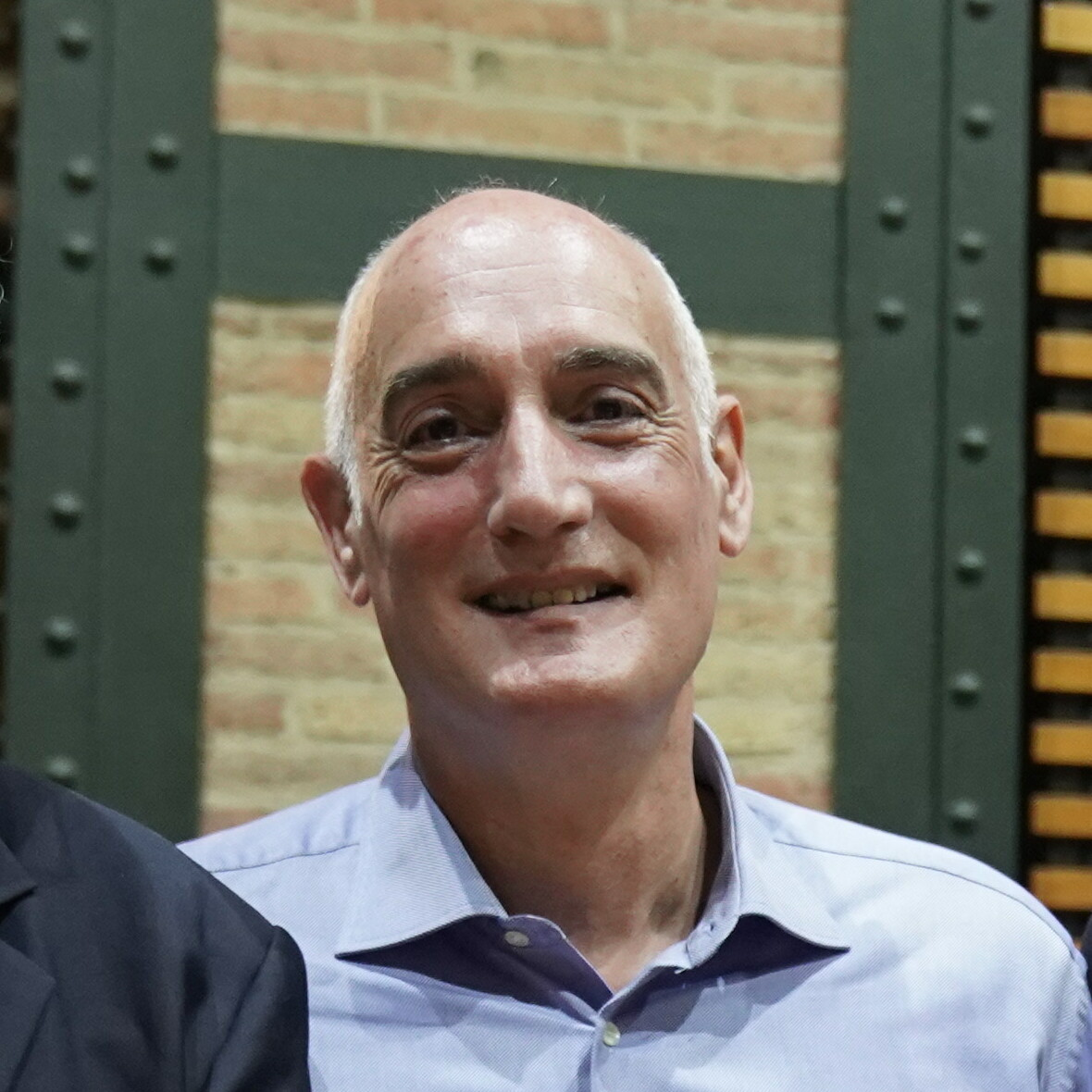

Personal information
- Born: 26 April 1964 (age 62) Badalona, Spain
- Listed height: 2.05 m (6 ft 9 in)

Career information
- Playing career: 1984–1998
- Position: Center

Career history

Playing
- 1984–1986: Joventut Badalona
- 1986–1992: Málaga
- 1992–1994: Estudiantes
- 1994–1996: Salamanca
- 1996–1998: Estudiantes

Coaching
- 2010–2011: Joventut Badalona (assistant)

Rafael Vecina Aceijas (born 26 April 1964 in Badalona, Spain) is a retired basketball player. He played 24 games for the Spain national team.

== Clubs ==
- 1984-86: Joventut Badalona
- 1986-92: CB Málaga
- 1992-94: CB Estudiantes
- 1994-96: CB Salamanca
- 1996-98: CB Estudiantes
