= Orhun Ene =

Turkish basketball player and coach

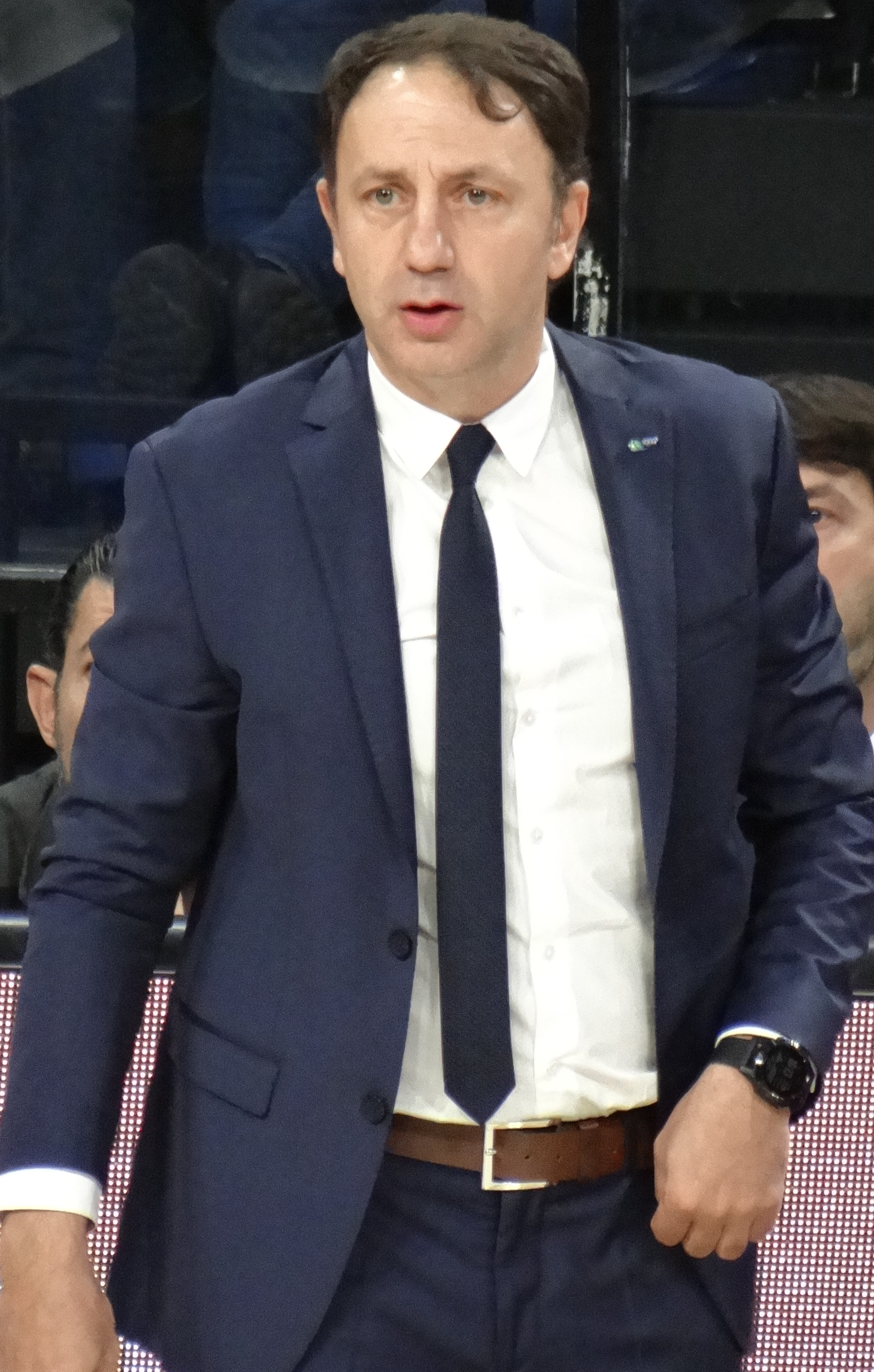

Petkim Spor
- Title: Head coach
- League: Basketbol Süper Ligi

Personal information
- Born: 1 February 1967 (age 59) Erzurum, Turkey
- Listed height: 6 ft 2 in (1.88 m)

Career information
- Playing career: 1985–2003
- Position: Point guard
- Number: 7
- Coaching career: 2004–present

Career history

Playing
- 1985–1989: Eczacıbaşı
- 1989–1992: Paşabahçe
- 1992–1993: Fenerbahçe
- 1993–1997: Ülkerspor
- 1997–2001: Galatasaray
- 2001–2003: İTÜ

Coaching
- 2004: Turkey Under-16
- 2005–2006: Turkey Under-18
- 2005, 2008–2009: Turkey Under-20
- 2006–2007: FMV Isikspor Istanbul
- 2007: Turkey Under-19
- 2007–2009: Antalya BB
- 2009–2013: Banvit
- 2010–2012: Turkey (assistant)
- 2011: Turkey
- 2013–2014: Darüşşafaka
- 2015–2020: Tofaş
- 2020–2022: Turkey
- 2023–2025: Tofaş
- 2026–present: Petkim Spor

Career highlights
- As player: FIBA EuroStar (1996); 3× Turkish League champion (1988, 1989, 1995); 2× Turkish Supercup winner (1988, 1995); Turkish Cup winner (1992); As head coach: 2× Turkish 2nd Division champion (2014, 2016)

Orhun Ene (born 1 February 1967 in Erzurum, Turkey) is a Turkish former professional basketball player and coach. He is the current head coach for Petkim Spor of the Basketbol Süper Ligi (BSL). During his playing career, at a height of 1.88 m (6 ft 2 in) tall, he played at the point guard position.

== Professional career ==
During his club career, Ene won 3 Turkish League championships (1988, 1989, 1995), the Turkish Cup (1992), and 2 Turkish Supercups (1988, 1995).

== National team career ==
Ene was a member of the senior Turkish national team. With Turkey, he won a silver medal at the 2001 EuroBasket. He also played at the 1993 EuroBasket, the 1995 EuroBasket, and the 1997 EuroBasket.

== Coaching career ==
Ene was named the head coach of the senior Turkish national team in 2011, after Bogdan Tanjević's departure from the position.

On January 25, 2023, he signed with Tofas S.K. of the Turkish Basketbol Süper Ligi (BSL).

On March 30, 2026, he signed with Petkim Spor of the Basketbol Süper Ligi (BSL).

== Personal life ==
Ene is married to former women's basketball player Zeynepgül Ene, who for a long period of time, played with Galatasaray Istanbul Women. He is the uncle of Derin and Mina Ene. He owns a boat named Natasha.
