= Volkan Aydın =

Turkish basketball player (born 1969)

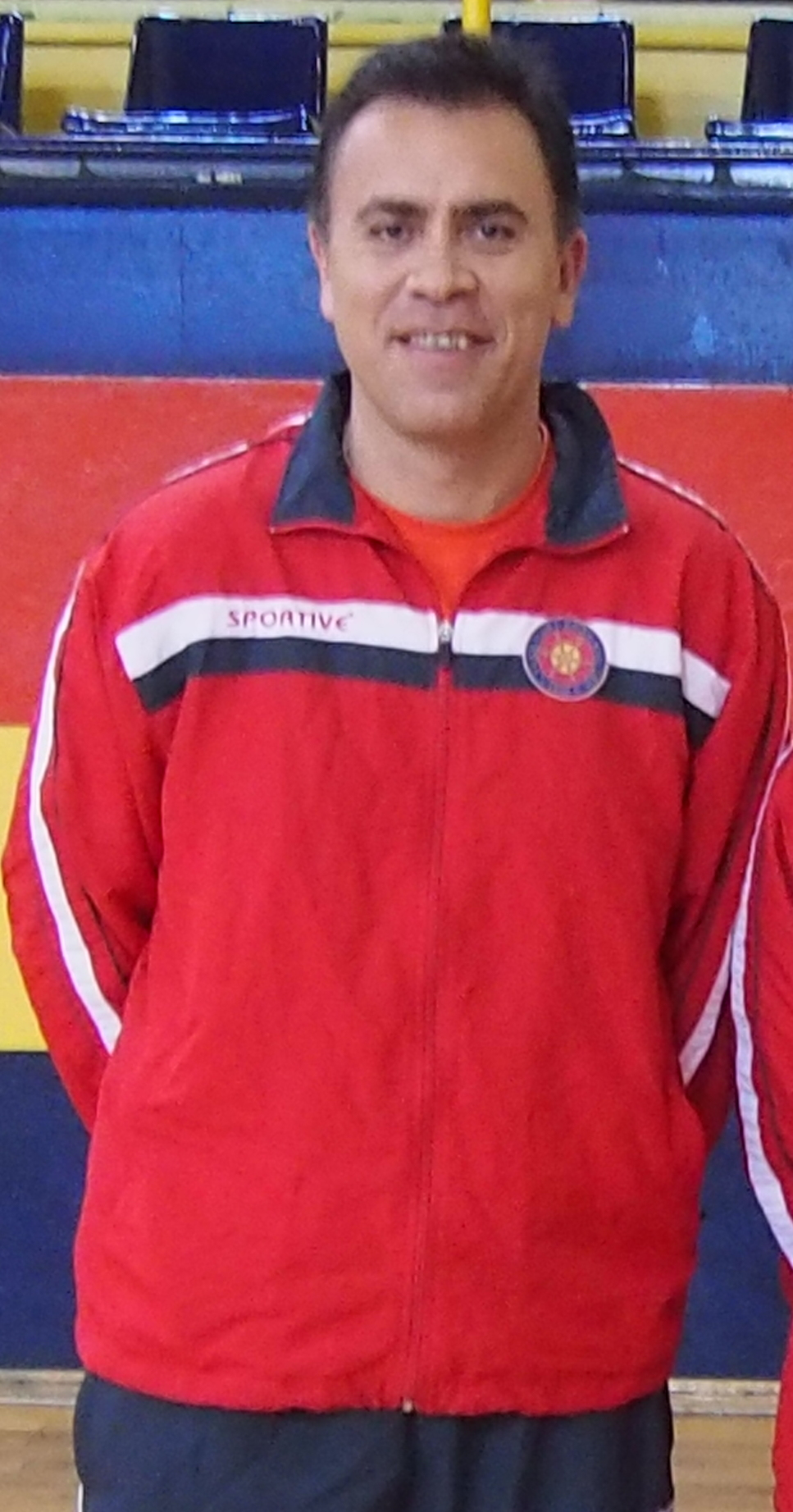

Volkan Aydın (born January 11, 1969, in Kelkit) is a retired Turkish basketball player who played professionally from 1987 to 2001. He played for Efes Pilsen, Ülkerspor and Beşiktaş.

== See also ==
- Basketball in Turkey
- Rosters of the top basketball teams in European club competitions
