= Andrei Fetisov =

Russian basketball player (born 1972)

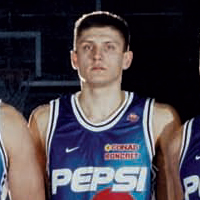
- Fetisov in 1997

Personal information
- Born: January 19, 1972 (age 54) Novokuznetsk, Russian SFSR, Soviet Union
- Listed height: 6 ft 10 in (2.08 m)
- Listed weight: 220 lb (100 kg)

Career information
- NBA draft: 1994: 2nd round, 36th overall pick
- Drafted by: Boston Celtics
- Playing career: 1991–2007
- Position: Power forward

Career history
- 1991–1993: Spartak St. Petersburg
- 1993–1996: Forum Valladolid
- 1996: Barcelona Bàsquet
- 1996–1997: Dynamo Moscow
- 1997–1998: Rimini Basket
- 1998–1999: Avtodor Saratov
- 1999–2000: Spartak St. Petersburg
- 2000–2001: CSKA Moscow
- 2001: Śląsk Wrocław
- 2001–2002: CSKA Moscow
- 2002–2003: UNICS Kazan
- 2003–2005: Dynamo Moscow
- 2005–2006: Lokomotiv Rostov
- 2006–2007: Spartak Primorye

Career highlights
- FIBA European Selection (1995); Spanish ACB League All-Star (1995); CIS Premier League champion (1992); Russian Cup winner (2003); Sport Express' Russian Player of the Year (1993); Russian Super League MVP (1999); 2× Russian Super League All-Star (1997, 2000)
- Stats at Basketball Reference
Medals
Men's basketball
Representing Russia
FIBA World Cup
Silver medal – second place	1994 Canada
EuroBasket
Silver medal – second place	1993 Germany
Bronze medal – third place	1997 Germany

Andrei Sergeyevich Fetisov (alternate spelling: Andrey) (Russian: Андрей Сергеевич Фетисов; born 19 January 1972) is a Russian former professional basketball player and basketball executive. He was the President of the Russian basketball club Spartak Saint Petersburg, from September 2017, until 2020.

== Professional career ==
Fetisov was a second round pick of the NBA's Boston Celtics, in the 1994 NBA draft, at which time he was playing for the Spanish club Forum Valladolid. After the draft, his draft rights were traded to the Milwaukee Bucks.

He was a member of the FIBA European Selection team, in 1995.

== National team career ==
Fetisov was a member of the senior Russian national basketball team. With Russia, he won a silver medal at the 1993 FIBA EuroBasket, a silver medal at the 1994 FIBA World Championship, and a bronze medal at the 1997 FIBA EuroBasket. He also played at the 1995 FIBA EuroBasket, and the 2000 Summer Olympic Games.

== Executive career ==
From 2014 to 2017, Fetisov worked in the management of the Russian basketball club Zenit Saint Petersburg, as the head of the club's scouting department.

In September 2017, Fetisov became the President of the Russian basketball club Spartak Saint Petersburg, a position he held until 2020, when the club was dissolved due to financial problems. After that, Fetisov was involved in the re-establishing of the club under the name of Spartak Leningrad Oblast. With the club being based in the Luga district, in Leningrad Oblast.
