= Ofer Fleisher =

Israeli basketball player

Ofer Fleisher עופר פליישר
Personal information
- Born: March 14, 1966 (age 60) Ramat Gan, Israel
- Listed height: 2.08 m (6 ft 10 in)

Ofer Fleisher (Hebrew: עופר פליישר; born March 14, 1966, in Ramat Gan, Israel) is an Israeli former basketball player who played the center position. Fleisher played in the Israeli Basketball Premier League and for the Israeli national basketball team.

== Biography ==
Fleisher played the center position, and is 2.08m (6 ft 10 in) tall.

Fleisher played in the Israeli Basketball Premier League for Hapoel Tel Aviv, Hapoel Holon, Hapoel Galil Elyon, Ramat Hasharon, Maccabi Haifa, Ramat Gan, Bnei Herzelia, and Maccabi Netanya. He played for the Israeli national basketball team in the 1987 European Championship for Men, 1988 European Olympic Qualifying Tournament for Men, 1992 European Olympic Qualifying Tournament for Men, 1993 European Championship for Men, 1995 European Championship for Men, 1997 European Championship for Men, and 1999 European Championship for Men.
