= Slavko Kotnik =

Slovenian basketball player

Personal information
- Born: November 3, 1962 (age 64) Maribor, SFR Yugoslavia
- Listed height: 6 ft 9 in (2.06 m)

Career information
- Playing career: 1983–2002
- Position: Center

Career history
- 1983: AKK Branik Maribor
- 1983–1993: Smelt Olimpija
- 1993–1994: Reyer Venezia
- 1994: Estudiantes
- 1994–1995: Manresa
- 1995–1997: Satex Maribor
- 1997: Melilla
- 1997–1998: Dafnis
- 1998–2002: Union Olimpija

Career highlights
- 4x Slovenian champion (1992, 1993, 1999, 2001); 5x Slovenian Cup Winner (1992, 1993, 1999–2001)

Slavko Kotnik (born November 3, 1962) is a retired Yugoslav/Slovenian professional basketball player. Currently, Kotnik works as a basketball agent and technical commissar.

== Professional career ==
Kotnik started playing basketball at the age of 16 at AKK Branik, and in 1983 he moved to Olimpija. He stayed in Olimpija for ten seasons, until 1993. In the 1993–1994 season he signed with Reyer Venezia. After experiencing difficulties with the coach, he left Italy at half season and joined Estudiantes. For the 1994–1995 season he played for Manresa. In summer 1995 he signed a two-year contract with Satex Maribor. However, after financial troubles in the club, he left Maribor in autumn of 1997. After that he signed a one-month deal with Melilla. During the 1997–98 season he played for Dafni in the Greek First Division. During his last four seasons he played for the Euroleague team Olimpija.

=== International career ===
Kotnik was a member of the Slovenia national basketball team since 1992. He competed at Eurobasket 1993 and Eurobasket 1995. He represented Slovenia officially at 38 games and scored a total of 605 points.

== Personal life ==
Kotnik has two daughters: Katja (1990), a basketball player, and Tjaša (1992), a volleyball player. After retirement he established Sports Agency Kotnik, which has represented Goran Dragić.
