= Teoman Alibegović =

Slovene basketball coach and player

Personal information
- Born: January 11, 1967 (age 59) Zenica, SR Bosnia and Herzegovina, SFR Yugoslavia
- Listed height: 6 ft 9.5 in (2.07 m)
- Listed weight: 232 lb (105 kg)

Career information
- College: Oregon State (1988–1991)
- Playing career: 1991–2003
- Position: Power forward / center

Career history

Playing
- 1991–1992: Yakima Sun Kings
- 1992–1993: Mangiaebevi Bologna
- 1993–1996: Alba Berlin
- 1996–1997: Ülkerspor
- 1997: Genertel Trieste
- 1997–1998: Cáceres
- 1998–1999: Lineltex Trieste
- 1999–2002: Snaidero Udine
- 2002–2003: Ionikos Nea Filadelfeia

Coaching
- 2003–2005: Snaidero Udine
- 2006–2007: Legea Scafati

Career highlights
- As a player: 4× FIBA European Selection Team (1995 2×, 1996, 1998); FIBA Korać Cup champion (1995); Greek All-Star (2003); German BBL MVP (1994); German BBL All-Star (1995); German BBL All-Star Game MVP (1995)
Medals
Men's basketball
Representing Yugoslavia
U19 World Cup
Gold medal – first place	1987 Italy	Under-19
European Championship for Juniors
Gold medal – first place	1986 Austria	Under-18

Teoman "Teo" Alibegović (born January 11, 1967) is a Bosnian-Slovenian former professional basketball player, coach, and manager. With 990 points scored, he is the second all-time top scorer of the senior Slovenian national basketball team.

== Early years ==
Alibegović was born in Zenica, SR Bosnia-Herzegovina, SFR Yugoslavia. Later, he moved with his family to Jesenice, SR Slovenia, where he attended primary school, and started playing basketball with the junior teams of KK Jesenice. In 1982, he joined KK Olimpija's youth categories. After two years, he moved from Ljubljana to Sarajevo, where he played for what was then one of the top clubs in the Yugoslav First Basketball League, KK Bosna.

== College career ==
In 1988, Alibegović began attending Oregon State University. After 3 years, he graduated with degrees in business and communication.

== Professional career ==
The Quad City Thunder selected Alibegović in the 1991 Continental Basketball Association (CBA) draft, but he never played for them. However, in his first pro season, he played with the CBA team Yakima Sun Kings. Teo joined the Italian club Fortitudo Bologna, at the end of the 1991–92 season.

From 1993 to 1996, he played with the German club Alba Berlin, helping them win the FIBA Korać Cup championship. Before the 1996–97 season, he signed with Turkish club Ülkerspor, but after six months, he was back in Italy, this time with Trieste. The next season, 1997–98, he played with Cáceres CB in Spain. For the 1998–99 season, he returned to Trieste. From 1999 to 2002, he played for the Italian club Snaidero Udine. In his last pro year, he played in Greece, playing with Ionikos NF.

== National team career ==
At the youth level, Alibegović played for the Yugoslavia Under-18 and Under-19 national teams, which won the 1986 FIBA Europe Under-18 Championship, and the 1987 FIBA Under-19 World Cup. Alibegović was a member of the senior men's Slovenian national basketball team, from 1991 to 2001. With Slovenia, he played at four EuroBaskets (1993, 1995, 1997, 2001). With Slovenia's senior national team, he played in 52 games, and scored 990 points, which made him the all-time top scorer of Slovenia's senior national basketball team.

== Coaching career ==
Before the 2003–04 season, Alibegović was appointed the head coach of Udine. In 2005, he was the general manager of Fortitudo Bologna. He was the head coach of Leagea Scafati, from December 2006 to November 2007. From 2008 to 2010, he was head consultant of Udine.

== Personal life ==
Alibegović has three sons: Mirza (1992), Amar (1995), and Denis (1999), who are also basketball players. Mirza played for Brescia in Italy, where Denis played for the Stella Azzurra Roma youth teams. Amar also played for the Roman side teams, before he chose to play college basketball with the St. John's Red Storm. Amar now plays professionally in Italy. His nephew Luka Garza played for the Iowa Hawkeyes, and was a first-team All-America and Big Ten Conference Player of the Year in 2020. Luka Garza was selected in the 2021 NBA draft by the Detroit Pistons.
