= Stefano Rusconi =

Italian basketball player (born 1968)

Personal information
- Born: October 2, 1968 (age 58) Bassano del Grappa, Italy
- Listed height: 2.08 m (6 ft 10 in)
- Listed weight: 125 kg (275 lb)

Career information
- NBA draft: 1990: 2nd round, 52nd overall pick
- Drafted by: Cleveland Cavaliers
- Playing career: 1985–2010
- Position: Center
- Number: 51

Career history
- 1985–1991: Varese
- 1991–1995: Benetton Treviso
- 1995–1996: Phoenix Suns
- 1996–1998: Benetton Treviso
- 1998–1999: Baskonia
- 1999–2002: Olimpia Milano
- 2002–2003: Reggiana
- 2003–2006: Draghi Novara
- 2006–2007: Aironi Novara
- 2007–2008: Effe Genova
- 2008–2009: Tigullio Santa Margherita Ligure
- 2009: Riviera Vado
- 2009–2010: CUS Bari

Career highlights
- FIBA European Selection (1990); FIBA Saporta Cup champion (1995); 2× Italian League champion (1992, 1997); 3× Italian Cup winner (1993–1995); Italian Supercup winner (1997); Italian League MVP (1995); Spanish Cup winner (1999)
- Stats at NBA.com
- Stats at Basketball Reference

Stefano Rusconi (born October 2, 1968) is an Italian former professional basketball player. At a height of 208 cm (6 ft 10 in) tall, he played at the center position.

== Professional career ==
Rusconi was drafted by the Cleveland Cavaliers, in the 2nd round (52nd overall pick), of the 1990 NBA draft. They traded his NBA draft rights to the Phoenix Suns, in 1991, for the draft rights to Miloš Babić. Rusconi appeared in seven games with the Suns, in the 1995–96 NBA season.

He was a member of the FIBA European Selection team, in 1990. Rusconi was the Italian League MVP in 1995.

== National team career ==
Rusconi was a member of the senior Italian national basketball team. With Italy, he won the silver medal at the 1991 EuroBasket.
