= Indrek Rumma =

Estonian basketball player

Indrek Rumma (born 14 September 1969) is an Estonian basketball player.

He was born in Tallinn. In 1987, he graduated from Estonian Sports Gymnasium (TSIK). During 1989–91, he studied at Tallinn Pedagogical Institute, and later at Estonian Business School.

His first basketball coach was Jaanus Levkoi. He has played at Kalev. During 1990–2001, he was a member of Estonia men's national basketball team.
