= Sergei Babkov (basketball) =

Russian basketball player (1967–2023)

Personal information
- Born: 5 June 1967 Novosibirsk, Russian SFSR, USSR
- Died: 21 August 2023 (aged 56)
- Listed height: 1.96 m (6 ft 5 in)

Career information
- Playing career: 1985–2001
- Position: Point guard, shooting guard

Career history
- 1992–1994: TBB Trier
- 1994–1999: Unicaja Málaga
- 1999–2000: Joventut Badalona
- 2000–2001: Lokomotiv Novosibirsk

Career highlights
- Basketball Bundesliga Top Scorer (1994)
Medals
Men's basketball
Representing Russia
FIBA World Cup
Silver medal – second place	1994 Canada	Russia
Silver medal – second place	1998 Greece	Russia

Sergei Anatolyevich Babkov (Russian: Сергей Анатольевич Бабков; 5 June 1967 – 21 August 2023) was a Russian professional basketball player.

== Professional career ==
Babkov was the top scorer of the German League, in 1994.

== National team career ==
Babkov was a part of the senior Russia national team that won silver medals at the 1994 FIBA World Championship (in the gold medal game, he led all scorers with 22 points) and the 1998 FIBA World Championship.

== Death ==
Sergei Babkov died on 21 August 2023, at the age of 56.
