= Vladan Alanović =

Croatian basketball player (born 1967)

Personal information
- Born: July 3, 1967 (age 59) Zadar, SR Croatia, SFR Yugoslavia
- Listed height: 6 ft 3 in (1.91 m)
- Listed weight: 179 lb (81 kg)

Career information
- Playing career: 1989–2001
- Position: Point guard

Career history
- 1989–1990: Novi Zagreb
- 1990–1996: Cibona Zagreb
- 1996–1997: Tofas Bursa
- 1997–1998: KK Split
- 1998–1999: CB Murcia
- 1999: Turk Telekom Ankara
- 1999–2000: CSKA Moscow
- 2000–2001: Slask Wroclaw
Medals
Representing Croatia
Summer Olympic Games
Silver medal – second place	1992 Barcelona	National Team
FIBA World Cup
Bronze medal – third place	1994 Canada	National Team
FIBA EuroBasket
Bronze medal – third place	1993 Germany	National Team
Bronze medal – third place	1995 Greece	National Team

Vladan Alanović (born July 3, 1967) is a retired Croatian basketball player, who won the silver medal with the Croatian national basketball team at the 1992 Summer Olympics in Barcelona, Spain.
