= Ömer Büyükaycan =

Turkish basketball player (born 1966)

Ömer Büyükaycan (born 10 May 1966 in Istanbul, Turkey) is a former Turkish professional basketball player. He is 2.08 m and played power forward for the Turkey national basketball team over 130 times.

He also attended Loyola University Chicago.

== Career ==
- Eczacıbaşı B.K. (1983–86)
- Galatasaray Istanbul (1986–89)
- Köln Galatasaray B.K. (1989–90)
- Çukurova Sanayi (1990–92)
- Nasaşspor (1992–93)
- Fenerbahçe (1993–94)
- Galatasaray Istanbul (1994–97)
- Darüşşafaka S.K. (1997–98)
- Beşiktaş Istanbul (1998–99)
