= Tamer Oyguç =

Turkish basketball player (born 1966)

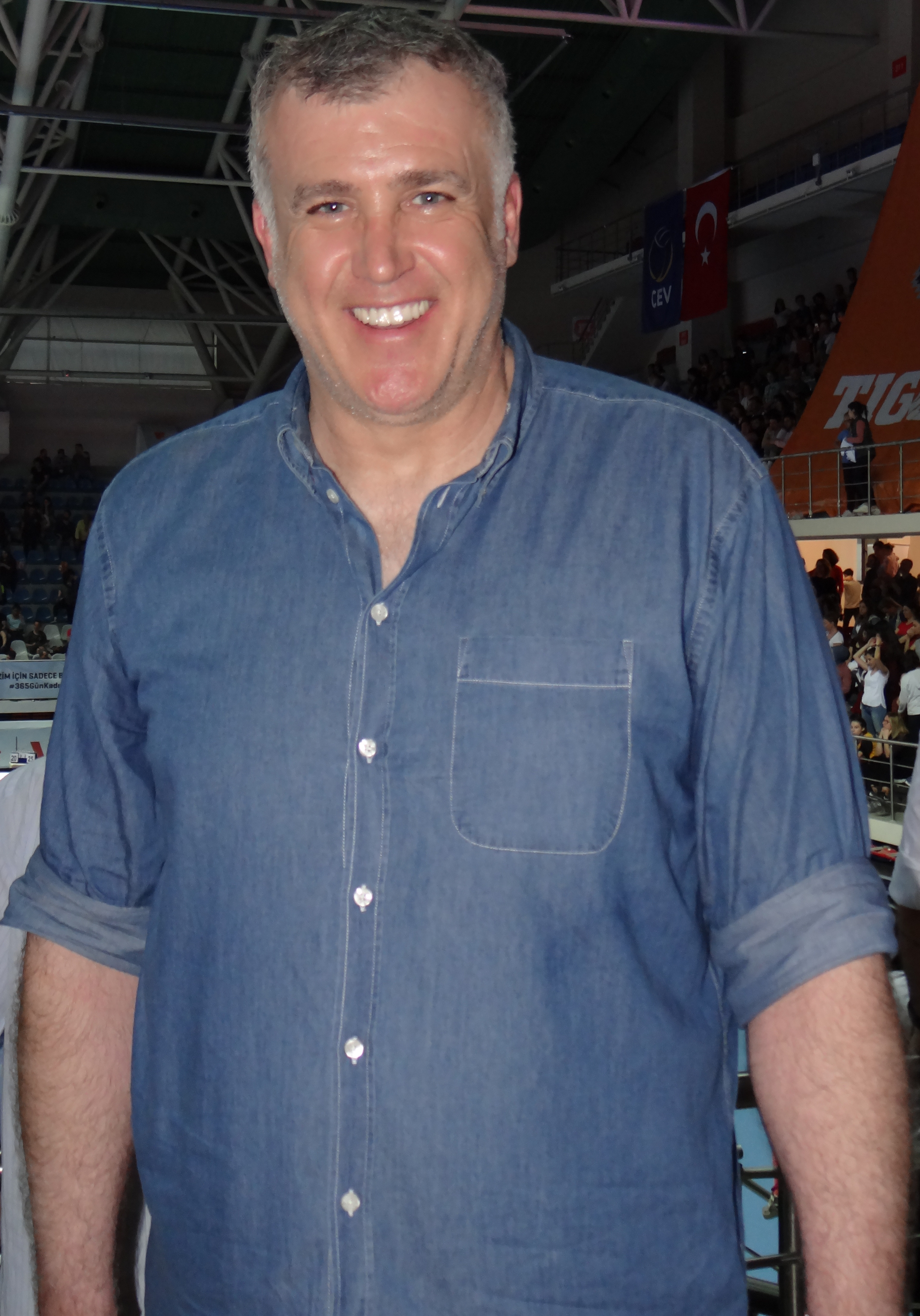

Personal information
- Born: January 11, 1966 (age 60) Malatya, Turkey
- Listed height: 6 ft 10 in (2.08 m)
- Listed weight: 250 lb (113 kg)

Career information
- NBA draft: 1988: undrafted
- Playing career: 1983–2010
- Position: Center
- Number: 13, 15

Career history
- 1983–1989: Eczacıbaşı
- 1989–1998: Efes Pilsen
- 1998: Beşiktaş
- 1998–1999: Fenerbahçe
- 1999-2000: Karagücü
- 2000-2001: Beşiktaş
- 2001–2002: Galatasaray
- 2003–2004: Kocaelispor
- 2009–2010: BASK

Tamer Oyguç (born January 11, 1966) is a former Turkish professional basketball player. He finished his Army Duty in Ankara (Etimesgut) as a player of Karagücü National Team. He has 2nd division winner at this team. He spent most of his career with Efes Pilsen. The former center is 2.10 m tall and wore the number 13 jersey for all teams he played on. In his playing times, he was famous for his hook shots.

== International career ==
Oyguç is a former Turkish national team center.
