= Thierry Gadou =

French basketball player (born 1969)

Medal record

Representing France

Men's basketball

Olympic Games
Silver medal – second place	2000 Sydney	Team competition

Thierry Gadou (born 13 January 1969 in Vieux-Boucau-les-Bains) is a French basketball player formerly with Élan Béarnais Pau-Orthez. Gadou won a silver medal with the France national basketball team at the 2000 Summer Olympics.
