= Nadav Henefeld =

Israeli basketball player (born 1968)

Nadav Henefeld נדב הנפלד
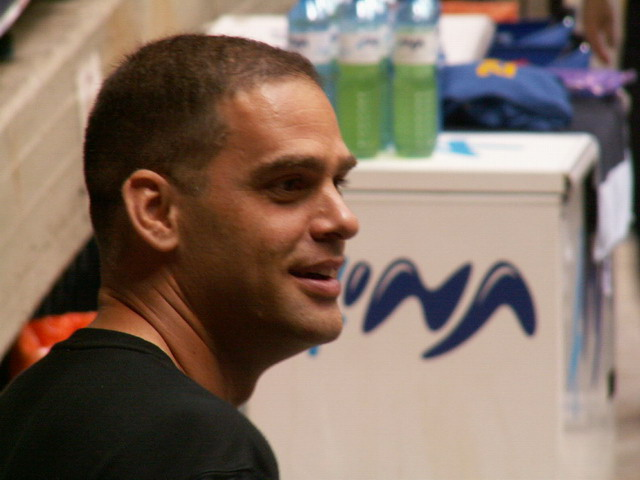
- Henefeld in 2005

Personal information
- Born: June 19, 1968 (age 58) Ramat Hasharon, Israel
- Listed height: 2.00 m (6 ft 7 in)
- Listed weight: 107 kg (236 lb)

Career information
- College: UConn (1989–1990)
- NBA draft: 1991: undrafted
- Playing career: 1988–2002
- Position: Power forward

Career history
- 1988–1989: Hapoel Galil Elyon
- 1990–2002: Maccabi Tel Aviv

Career highlights
- FIBA SuproLeague champion (2001); FIBA European Selection (1996); FIBA EuroStar (1997); 11× Israeli League champion (1991, 1992, 1994–2002); 8× Israeli Cup winner (1988, 1991, 1994, 1998–2002); Big East Rookie of the Year (1990); Third-team All-Big East (1990)

Nadav Henefeld (Hebrew: נדב הנפלד; born June 19, 1968) is an Israeli former professional basketball player. During his playing career, he was a 2.00 m (6'6 3/4") tall power forward.

== Early career ==
Henefeld was born in Ramat Hasharon, Israel, and he initially played pro basketball in his home country, for two seasons (1987–88, and 1988–89).

He won a gold medal with Team Israel, and was voted MVP of the basketball competition, at the 1989 Maccabiah Games.

== College career ==
Henefeld attended the University of Connecticut, and played with the Connecticut Huskies, in the 1989–90 "Dream Season", where he was selected as the Big East Conference Rookie of the Year, and set an all-time NCAA Division I freshman record, with 138 steals.

== Professional career ==
Henefeld returned to Israel for the 1990–91 season, and played with Maccabi Tel Aviv for 12 years, until his retirement from basketball. During that time, he helped his team reach the EuroLeague Final Four on four occasions, in 1991, 2000, 2001 (FIBA SuproLeague), and 2002, winning the FIBA SuproLeague trophy in 2001.

== National team career ==
Henefeld was a regular member of the senior Israeli national team.
