= Alessandro Frosini =

Italian basketball player (born 1972)

Personal information
- Born: 22 September 1972 (age 53) Siena, Italy
- Listed height: 2.09 m (6 ft 10 in)

Career information
- Playing career: 1990–2011
- Position: Center

Career history
- 1990–1994: Scaligera Verona
- 1994–1997: Fortitudo Bologna
- 1997–2003: Virtus Bologna
- 2003–2005: Scavolini Pesaro
- 2005–2007: Angelico Biella
- 2007–2009: Juvecaserta
- 2009–2011: Reggio Emilia

Career highlights
- 2x Euroleague champion (1998, 2001); 2x Italian League champion (1998, 2001); 4x Italian Cup winner (1991, 1999, 2001, 2002)
Medals
Men's basketball
Representing Italy
Eurobasket
Silver medal – second place	1997 Spain	National team
European U-18 Championship
Gold medal – first place	1990 Netherlands	U-18 Team

Alessandro Frosini (born 22 September 1972) is an Italian former professional basketball player. He was also a member of the Italian national basketball team. He has won the EuroLeague twice in 1997–98 and 2000–01, along with Virtus Bologna.

He is now a sports director for Grissin Bon Reggio Emilia.
