= EuroBasket 1997 squads =

The following is the list of squads for each of the 16 teams competing in the EuroBasket 1997, held in Spain between 24 June and 6 July 1997. Each team selected a squad of 12 players for the tournament.

== Group A ==
=== Bosnia and Herzegovina ===
Bosnia and Herzegovina men's national basketball team roster
Players
Coaches

Pos.	No.	Name	Age – Date of birth	Height	Club
G	4	Nenad Marković	29 – 6 June 1968	1.96 m (6 ft 5 in)	Limoges CSP	(France)
F	5	Gordan Firić	26 – 1 September 1970	1.97 m (6 ft 6 in)	Pallacanestro Trieste	(Italy)
PG	6	Adis Bećiragić	27 – 18 June 1970	1.90 m (6 ft 3 in)	Ülkerspor	(Turkey)
PF	7	Samir Lerić	23 – 12 September 1973	2.06 m (6 ft 9 in)	KD Slovan	(Slovenia)
F	8	Azur Korlatović	26 – 1 February 1971	2.00 m (6 ft 7 in)	KK Sloboda Tuzla	(Bosnia and Herzegovina)
C	9	Sejo Bukva	30 – 16 September 1966	2.17 m (7 ft 1 in)	BK Inter Bratislava	(Slovakia)
PG	10	Samir Selešković	27 – 10 April 1970	1.88 m (6 ft 2 in)	Türk Telekom B.K.	(Turkey)
PF	11	Samir Avdić	30 – 21 March 1967	2.05 m (6 ft 9 in)	Tofaş S.K.	(Turkey)
PF	12	Elvir Ovčina	20 – 16 July 1976	2.11 m (6 ft 11 in)	Syracuse University	(United States)
C	13	Dževad Alihodžić	28 – 13 February 1969	2.11 m (6 ft 11 in)	KK Cibona	(Croatia)
G	14	Adnan Hodžić	26 – 27 April 1971	1.92 m (6 ft 4 in)	KK Sloboda Tuzla	(Bosnia and Herzegovina)
F	15	Haris Mujezinović	23 – 21 January 1974	2.05 m (6 ft 9 in)	Indiana University	(United States)

Head coach

- Sabit Hadžić

Legend

- Club – describes last
  club before the tournament
- Age – describes age
  on 24 June 1997

=== Greece ===
Greece men's national basketball team roster
Players
Coaches

Pos.	No.	Name	Age – Date of birth	Height	Club
PG	4	Georgios Kalaitzis	20 – 29 August 1976	1.95 m (6 ft 5 in)	Panionios	(Greece)
PG	5	Kostas Patavoukas	31 – 3 February 1966	1.91 m (6 ft 3 in)	Virtus Bologna	(Italy)
PG	6	Nikos Boudouris	25 – 25 September 1971	1.93 m (6 ft 4 in)	P.A.O.K.	(Greece)
F	7	Dimitrios Papanikolaou	20 – 7 February 1977	2.02 m (6 ft 8 in)	Olympiacos	(Greece)
G	8	Giorgos Sigalas	25 – 31 July 1971	2.01 m (6 ft 7 in)	Olympiacos	(Greece)
PG	9	Angelos Koronios	28 – 16 March 1969	1.86 m (6 ft 1 in)	Peristeri	(Greece)
F	10	Fragiskos Alvertis	23 – 11 June 1974	2.06 m (6 ft 9 in)	Panathinaikos	(Greece)
PF	11	Nikos Oikonomou	24 – 19 February 1973	2.08 m (6 ft 10 in)	Panathinaikos	(Greece)
PF	12	Christos Myriounis	26 – 15 June 1971	2.05 m (6 ft 9 in)	Apollon Patras	(Greece)
C	13	Giannis Giannoulis	21 – 5 June 1976	2.08 m (6 ft 10 in)	P.A.O.K.	(Greece)
C	14	Efthimios Rentzias	21 – 11 January 1976	2.12 m (6 ft 11 in)	P.A.O.K.	(Greece)
F	15	Fanis Christodoulou	32 – 22 May 1965	2.03 m (6 ft 8 in)	Panionios	(Greece)

Head coach

- Panagiotis Giannakis

Legend

- Club – describes last
  club before the tournament
- Age – describes age
  on 24 June 1997

=== Russia ===
Russia men's national basketball team roster
Players
Coaches

Pos.	No.	Name	Age – Date of birth	Height	Club
PG	4	Vasily Karasev	26 – 14 April 1971	1.93 m (6 ft 4 in)	Efes Pilsen	(Turkey)
G	5	Igor Kudelin	24 – 10 August 1972	1.95 m (6 ft 5 in)	PBC CSKA Moscow	(Russia)
C	6	Igor Kurashov	25 – 2 April 1972	2.07 m (6 ft 9 in)	PBC CSKA Moscow	(Russia)
PF	7	Evgeni Kisurin	28 – 28 January 1969	2.07 m (6 ft 9 in)	KK Cibona	(Croatia)
PG	8	Evgeniy Pashutin	28 – 2 June 1969	1.88 m (6 ft 2 in)	BC Avtodor Saratov	(Russia)
G	9	Dmitry Shakulin	29 – 11 May 1968	1.96 m (6 ft 5 in)	PBC CSKA Moscow	(Russia)
G	10	Sergei Babkov	30 – 5 June 1967	1.92 m (6 ft 4 in)	CB Málaga	(Spain)
C	11	Mikhail Mikhaylov	26 – 17 May 1971	2.06 m (6 ft 9 in)	Real Madrid	(Spain)
G	12	Zakhar Pashutin	23 – 3 May 1974	1.96 m (6 ft 5 in)	BC Avtodor Saratov	(Russia)
PF	13	Andrei Fetisov	24 – 19 January 1973	2.08 m (6 ft 10 in)	BC Dynamo Moscow	(Russia)
F	14	Sergei Panov	26 – 30 June 1970	2.05 m (6 ft 9 in)	PBC CSKA Moscow	(Russia)
C	15	Vitaliy Nosov	29 – 1 February 1968	2.12 m (6 ft 11 in)	KK Union Olimpija	(Slovenia)

Head coach

- Sergei Belov

Legend

- Club – describes last
  club before the tournament
- Age – describes age
  on 24 June 1997

=== Turkey ===
Turkey men's national basketball team roster
Players
Coaches

Pos.	No.	Name	Age – Date of birth	Height	Club
PF	4	Murat Konuk	25 – 18 February 1972	2.03 m (6 ft 8 in)	Tofaş S.K.	(Turkey)
PG	5	Kerem Tunçeri	18 – 14 April 1979	1.90 m (6 ft 3 in)	Galatasaray	(Turkey)
PF	6	Mirsad Türkcan	21 – 7 June 1976	2.06 m (6 ft 9 in)	Efes Pilsen	(Turkey)
PG	7	Orhun Ene	30 – 1 February 1967	1.88 m (6 ft 2 in)	Ülkerspor	(Turkey)
F	8	Volkan Aydın	28 – 11 January 1969	1.98 m (6 ft 6 in)	Efes Pilsen	(Turkey)
G	9	Harun Erdenay	29 – 27 May 1968	1.98 m (6 ft 6 in)	Ülkerspor	(Turkey)
G	10	İbrahim Kutluay	23 – 7 January 1974	1.97 m (6 ft 6 in)	Fenerbahçe	(Turkey)
PG	11	Murat Evliyaoğlu	28 – 2 June 1969	1.94 m (6 ft 4 in)	Efes Pilsen	(Turkey)
C	12	Hüseyin Beşok	21 – 2 August 1975	2.12 m (6 ft 11 in)	Efes Pilsen	(Turkey)
C	13	Tamer Oyguç	31 – 11 January 1966	2.10 m (6 ft 11 in)	Efes Pilsen	(Turkey)
F	14	Tunç Girgin	27 – 15 September 1969	2.00 m (6 ft 7 in)	Türk Telekom B.K.	(Turkey)
F	15	Ufuk Sarıca	25 – 13 June 1972	1.94 m (6 ft 4 in)	Efes Pilsen	(Turkey)

Head coach

- Ercüment Sunter

Legend

- Club – describes last
  club before the tournament
- Age – describes age
  on 24 June 1997

== Group B ==
=== France ===
France men's national basketball team roster
Players
Coaches

Pos.	No.	Name	Age – Date of birth	Height	Club
PG	4	Laurent Pluvy	23 – 12 July 1973	1.83 m (6 ft 0 in)	ASVEL Basket	(France)
C	5	Jérôme Moïso	19 – 15 June 1978	2.08 m (6 ft 10 in)	Milford Academy	(United States)
PF	6	Fabien Dubos	19 – 10 November 1977	2.07 m (6 ft 9 in)	Pau-Orthez	(France)
G	7	Laurent Foirest	23 – 18 September 1973	1.97 m (6 ft 6 in)	Pau-Orthez	(France)
F	8	Yann Bonato	25 – 4 March 1972	2.01 m (6 ft 7 in)	Victoria Libertas Pesaro	(Italy)
PG	9	Frédéric Fauthoux	24 – 6 December 1972	1.80 m (5 ft 11 in)	Pau-Orthez	(France)
F	10	Stéphane Risacher	24 – 26 August 1972	2.03 m (6 ft 8 in)	Paris Basket Racing	(France)
PF	11	Thierry Gadou	28 – 13 January 1969	2.05 m (6 ft 9 in)	Pau-Orthez	(France)
C	12	Cyril Julian	23 – 29 March 1974	2.06 m (6 ft 9 in)	SLUC Nancy Basket	(France)
G	13	Georges Adams	30 – 9 March 1967	1.95 m (6 ft 5 in)	ASVEL Basket	(France)
PG	14	Laurent Sciarra	23 – 8 August 1973	1.95 m (6 ft 5 in)	CB Ciudad de Huelva	(Spain)
PF	15	Rémi Rippert	25 – 16 July 1971	2.04 m (6 ft 8 in)	ASVEL Basket	(France)

Head coach

- Jean-Pierre de Vincenzi

Legend

- Club – describes last
  club before the tournament
- Age – describes age
  on 24 June 1997

=== Israel ===
Israel men's national basketball team roster
Players
Coaches

Pos.	No.	Name	Age – Date of birth	Height	Club
F	4	Nadav Henefeld	29 – 19 June 1968	2.02 m (6 ft 8 in)	Maccabi Tel Aviv B.C.	(Israel)
PG	5	Lior Arditty	29 – 16 December 1967	1.92 m (6 ft 4 in)	Bnei Herzliya	(Israel)
G	6	Shalom Turgeman	27 – 7 April 1970	1.92 m (6 ft 4 in)	Hapoel Jerusalem B.C.	(Israel)
PF	7	Amir Muchtari	25 – 12 June 1972	2.08 m (6 ft 10 in)	Hapoel Galil Elyon	(Israel)
PF	8	David Bernsley	28 – 6 May 1969	2.05 m (6 ft 9 in)	Givat Shmuel	(Israel)
PG	9	Oren Aharoni	23 – 12 November 1973	2.02 m (6 ft 8 in)	Maccabi Ramat Gan B.C.	(Israel)
PG	10	Oded Kattash	22 – 10 October 1974	1.92 m (6 ft 4 in)	Maccabi Tel Aviv B.C.	(Israel)
G	11	Doron Sheffer	25 – 12 March 1972	1.95 m (6 ft 5 in)	Maccabi Tel Aviv B.C.	(Israel)
F	12	Gur Shelef	23 – 10 January 1974	2.04 m (6 ft 8 in)	Hapoel Galil Elyon	(Israel)
F	13	Uri Cohen-Mintz	23 – 1 August 1973	2.05 m (6 ft 9 in)	Ironi Ramat Gan	(Israel)
C	14	Tomer Steinhauer	30 – 3 October 1966	2.07 m (6 ft 9 in)	Maccabi Tel Aviv B.C.	(Israel)
C	15	Ofer Fleisher	31 – 14 March 1966	2.08 m (6 ft 10 in)	Bnei Herzliya	(Israel)

Head coach

- Zvi Sherf

Legend

- Club – describes last
  club before the tournament
- Age – describes age
  on 24 June 1997

=== Lithuania ===
Lithuania men's national basketball team roster
Players
Coaches

Pos.	No.	Name	Age – Date of birth	Height	Club
PG	4	Šarūnas Jasikevičius	21 – 5 March 1976	1.93 m (6 ft 4 in)	University of Maryland	(United States)
PF	5	Andrius Jurkūnas	21 – 21 May 1976	2.05 m (6 ft 9 in)	Clemson University	(United States)
PF	6	Kęstutis Šeštokas	21 – 15 April 1976	2.02 m (6 ft 8 in)	BC Žalgiris	(Lithuania)
F	7	Mindaugas Timinskas	23 – 28 March 1974	2.01 m (6 ft 7 in)	Strasbourg IG	(France)
F	8	Saulius Štombergas	23 – 14 December 1973	2.04 m (6 ft 8 in)	Atletas Kaunas	(Lithuania)
C	9	Eurelijus Žukauskas	23 – 22 August 1973	2.18 m (7 ft 2 in)	BC Neptūnas	(Lithuania)
G	10	Darius Lukminas	29 – 9 February 1968	1.95 m (6 ft 5 in)	BC Avtodor Saratov	(Russia)
G	11	Dainius Adomaitis	23 – 19 January 1974	1.94 m (6 ft 4 in)	BC Žalgiris	(Lithuania)
F	12	Artūras Karnišovas	26 – 27 April 1971	2.04 m (6 ft 8 in)	FC Barcelona Bàsquet	(Spain)
PG	13	Darius Maskoliūnas	26 – 6 January 1971	1.95 m (6 ft 5 in)	BC Žalgiris	(Lithuania)
PF	14	Gintaras Einikis	27 – 30 September 1969	2.08 m (6 ft 10 in)	BC Avtodor Saratov	(Russia)
PF	15	Virginijus Praškevičius	23 – 3 April 1974	2.06 m (6 ft 9 in)	Minnesota Timberwolves	(United States)

Head coach

- Jonas Kazlauskas

Legend

- Club – describes last
  club before the tournament
- Age – describes age
  on 24 June 1997

=== Slovenia ===
Slovenia men's national basketball team roster
Players
Coaches

Pos.	No.	Name	Age – Date of birth	Height	Club	Ctr.
PG	4	Walter Jeklin	27 – 27 September 1969	1.87 m (6 ft 2 in)	BC Krka	(Slovenia)
F	5	Goran Jagodnik	23 – 23 May 1974	2.02 m (6 ft 8 in)	KD Hopsi Polzela	(Slovenia)
PG	6	Jaka Daneu	26 – 3 February 1971	1.94 m (6 ft 4 in)	KK Union Olimpija	(Slovenia)
C	7	Radoslav Nesterovič	21 – 30 May 1976	2.13 m (7 ft 0 in)	KK Union Olimpija	(Slovenia)
C	8	Aleš Kunc	23 – 13 July 1973	2.08 m (6 ft 10 in)	KD Slovan	(Slovenia)
PG	9	Jure Zdovc	30 – 13 December 1966	1.98 m (6 ft 6 in)	Tofaş S.K.	(Turkey)
PF	10	Marko Tušek	21 – 17 July 1975	2.04 m (6 ft 8 in)	KK Union Olimpija	(Slovenia)
PF	11	Teoman Alibegović	30 – 11 January 1967	2.08 m (6 ft 10 in)	Pallacanestro Trieste	(Italy)
F	12	Marko Milič	20 – 7 May 1977	1.99 m (6 ft 6 in)	KK Union Olimpija	(Slovenia)
F	13	Boris Gorenc	23 – 3 December 1973	1.98 m (6 ft 6 in)	Strasbourg IG	(France)
PF	14	Ivica Jurković	24 – 26 March 1973	2.04 m (6 ft 8 in)	KK Union Olimpija	(Slovenia)
F	15	Radovan Trifunović	24 – 25 January 1973	2.02 m (6 ft 8 in)	Shaw University	(United States)

Head coach

- Andrej Urlep

Legend

- Club – describes last
  club before the tournament
- Age – describes age
  on 24 June 1997

== Group C ==
=== Italy ===
Italy men's national basketball team roster
Players
Coaches

Pos.	No.	Name	Age – Date of birth	Height	Club
PG	4	Claudio Coldebella	28 – 25 June 1968	1.98 m (6 ft 6 in)	A.E.K. Athens	(Greece)
PG	5	Davide Bonora	24 – 5 February 1973	1.86 m (6 ft 1 in)	Benetton Treviso	(Italy)
PF	6	Gregor Fučka	25 – 7 August 1971	2.15 m (7 ft 1 in)	Olimpia Milano	(Italy)
F	7	Riccardo Pittis	28 – 18 December 1968	2.03 m (6 ft 8 in)	Benetton Treviso	(Italy)
C	8	Denis Marconato	21 – 29 July 1975	2.11 m (6 ft 11 in)	Benetton Treviso	(Italy)
PF	9	Giacomo Galanda	22 – 30 January 1975	2.10 m (6 ft 11 in)	Scaligera Verona	(Italy)
G	10	Carlton Myers	26 – 30 March 1971	1.92 m (6 ft 4 in)	Fortitudo Bologna	(Italy)
F	11	Paolo Moretti	26 – 30 June 1970	2.00 m (6 ft 7 in)	Peristeri	(Greece)
G	12	Alessandro Abbio	26 – 13 March 1971	1.93 m (6 ft 4 in)	Virtus Bologna	(Italy)
C	13	Alessandro Frosini	24 – 22 September 1972	2.09 m (6 ft 10 in)	Fortitudo Bologna	(Italy)
C	14	Flavio Carera	34 – 18 January 1963	2.06 m (6 ft 9 in)	Virtus Bologna	(Italy)
PF	15	Dan Gay	35 – 20 July 1961	2.07 m (6 ft 9 in)	Fortitudo Bologna	(Italy)

Head coach

- Ettore Messina

Legend

- Club – describes last
  club before the tournament
- Age – describes age
  on 24 June 1997

=== Latvia ===
Latvia men's national basketball team roster
Players
Coaches

Pos.	No.	Name	Age – Date of birth	Height	Club
PF	4	Uvis Helmanis	25 – 10 June 1972	2.02 m (6 ft 8 in)	Metropole/I.O.S.	(Latvia)
C	5	Jānis Āzacis	26 – 8 May 1971	2.12 m (6 ft 11 in)	Brocēni/LMT	(Latvia)
PG	6	Edmunds Valeiko	25 – 22 June 1972	1.88 m (6 ft 2 in)	BK Baltika	(Latvia)
G	7	Roberts Štelmahers	22 – 19 November 1974	1.90 m (6 ft 3 in)	Brocēni/LMT	(Latvia)
F	8	Kārlis Muižnieks	33 – 25 May 1964	1.98 m (6 ft 6 in)	BK Baltika	(Latvia)
F	9	Edgars Šneps	25 – 13 April 1972	1.98 m (6 ft 6 in)	Brocēni/LMT	(Latvia)
PG	10	Raimonds Miglinieks	26 – 16 July 1970	1.88 m (6 ft 2 in)	Brocēni/LMT	(Latvia)
F	11	Ainārs Bagatskis	30 – 29 March 1967	1.98 m (6 ft 6 in)	Brocēni/LMT	(Latvia)
PF	12	Ivars Liepa	32 – 4 June 1965	2.03 m (6 ft 8 in)	BK Baltika	(Latvia)
PF	13	Ralfs Jansons	25 – 7 August 1971	2.02 m (6 ft 8 in)	LainERS	(Latvia)
C	14	Andrejs Bondarenko	33 – 22 October 1963	2.09 m (6 ft 10 in)	BK Baltika	(Latvia)
C	15	Igors Meļņiks	34 – 14 August 1962	2.05 m (6 ft 9 in)	BC Spartak Moscow	(Russia)

Head coach

- Igors Miglinieks

Legend

- Club – describes last
  club before the tournament
- Age – describes age
  on 24 June 1997

=== Poland ===
Poland men's national basketball team roster
Players
Coaches

Pos.	No.	Name	Age – Date of birth	Height	Club
PG	4	Robert Kościuk	28 – 17 January 1969	1.83 m (6 ft 0 in)	Anwil	(Poland)
PG	5	Andrzej Pluta	23 – 26 April 1974	1.85 m (6 ft 1 in)	Bobry Bytom	(Poland)
PG	6	Krzysztof Mila	27 – 6 June 1970	1.86 m (6 ft 1 in)	Polonia Przemyśl	(Poland)
G	7	Jarosław Darnikowski	25 – 3 July 1971	1.98 m (6 ft 6 in)	AZS UMK Toruń	(Poland)
F	8	Dominik Tomczyk	23 – 15 April 1974	2.04 m (6 ft 8 in)	Śląsk Wrocław	(Poland)
G	9	Maciej Zieliński	26 – 5 January 1971	1.98 m (6 ft 6 in)	Śląsk Wrocław	(Poland)
PF	10	Adam Wójcik	27 – 20 April 1970	2.08 m (6 ft 10 in)	Spirou Charleroi	(Belgium)
PF	11	Tomasz Jankowski	24 – 25 July 1972	2.07 m (6 ft 9 in)	WTK Anwil Włocławek	(Poland)
C	12	Piotr Szybilski	24 – 2 May 1973	2.07 m (6 ft 9 in)	Znicz Pruszków	(Poland)
C	13	Rafał Bigus	20 – 12 July 1976	2.15 m (7 ft 1 in)	Villanova University	(United States)
F	14	Mariusz Bacik	25 – 4 January 1972	2.07 m (6 ft 9 in)	Bobry Bytom	(Poland)
C	15	Krzysztof Dryja	23 – 4 January 1974	2.10 m (6 ft 11 in)	Znicz Pruszków	(Poland)

Head coach

- Eugeniusz Kijewski

Legend

- Club – describes last
  club before the tournament
- Age – describes age
  on 24 June 1997

=== FR Yugoslavia ===
FR Yugoslavia men's national basketball team roster
Players
Coaches

Pos.	No.	Name	Age – Date of birth	Height	Club
F	4	Dejan Bodiroga	24 – 2 March 1973	2.05 m (6 ft 9 in)	Real Madrid	(Spain)
G	5	Predrag Danilović	27 – 26 February 1970	2.01 m (6 ft 7 in)	Dallas Mavericks	(United States)
PG	6	Saša Obradović	28 – 29 January 1969	1.97 m (6 ft 6 in)	Alba Berlin	(Germany)
F	7	Nikola Lončar	25 – 31 May 1972	1.98 m (6 ft 6 in)	Pallacanestro Varese	(Italy)
G	8	Miroslav Radošević	24 – 1 January 1973	1.94 m (6 ft 4 in)	KK Borac Čačak	(Federal Republic of Yugoslavia)
G	9	Miroslav Berić	24 – 20 January 1973	2.00 m (6 ft 7 in)	KK Partizan	(Federal Republic of Yugoslavia)
PG	10	Aleksandar Đorđević	29 – 26 August 1967	1.88 m (6 ft 2 in)	FC Barcelona Bàsquet	(Spain)
C	11	Željko Rebrača	25 – 9 April 1972	2.13 m (7 ft 0 in)	Benetton Treviso	(Italy)
C	12	Nikola Bulatović	25 – 28 August 1971	2.10 m (6 ft 11 in)	FMP	(Federal Republic of Yugoslavia)
PF	13	Zoran Savić	30 – 18 November 1966	2.06 m (6 ft 9 in)	Virtus Bologna	(Italy)
PF	14	Dejan Tomašević	24 – 6 May 1973	2.08 m (6 ft 10 in)	KK Partizan	(Federal Republic of Yugoslavia)
PF	15	Milenko Topić	28 – 6 March 1969	2.04 m (6 ft 8 in)	KK BFC Beočin	(Federal Republic of Yugoslavia)

Head coach

- Želimir Obradović

Assistant coach(es)

- Miroslav Nikolić

Legend

- Club – describes last
  club before the tournament
- Age – describes age
  on 24 June 1997

== Group D ==
=== Croatia ===
Croatia men's national basketball team roster
Players
Coaches

Pos.	No.	Name	Age – Date of birth	Height	Club
G	4	Josip Sesar	19 – 17 January 1978	1.98 m (6 ft 6 in)	KK Zagreb	(Croatia)
PG	5	Damir Mulaomerović	22 – 19 September 1974	1.96 m (6 ft 5 in)	KK Cibona	(Croatia)
G	6	Gordan Giriček	20 – 20 June 1977	1.98 m (6 ft 6 in)	KK Cibona	(Croatia)
PG	7	Damir Milačić	22 – 25 February 1975	1.89 m (6 ft 2 in)	KK Zagreb	(Croatia)
PG	8	Vladan Alanović	29 – 3 July 1967	1.94 m (6 ft 4 in)	Tofaş S.K.	(Turkey)
G	9	Slaven Rimac	22 – 19 December 1974	1.93 m (6 ft 4 in)	KK Cibona	(Croatia)
C	10	Emilio Kovačić	29 – 11 January 1968	2.08 m (6 ft 10 in)	KK Zrinjevac	(Croatia)
C	11	Davor Pejčinović	26 – 28 March 1971	2.11 m (6 ft 11 in)	KK Cibona	(Croatia)
PF	12	Siniša Kelečević	27 – 10 April 1970	2.08 m (6 ft 10 in)	Telekom Baskets Bonn	(Germany)
PF	13	Nikola Prkačin	21 – 15 November 1975	2.08 m (6 ft 10 in)	KK Split	(Croatia)
C	14	Ivan Grgat	22 – 22 September 1974	2.10 m (6 ft 11 in)	KK Dubrava	(Croatia)
F	15	Davor Marcelić	28 – 25 May 1969	2.01 m (6 ft 7 in)	KK Cibona	(Croatia)

Head coach

- Petar Skansi

Legend

- Club – describes last
  club before the tournament
- Age – describes age
  on 24 June 1997

=== Germany ===
Germany men's national basketball team roster
Players
Coaches

Pos.	No.	Name	Age – Date of birth	Height	Club
PG	4	Henrik Rödl	28 – 4 March 1969	2.00 m (6 ft 7 in)	Alba Berlin	(Germany)
G	5	Jörg Lütcke	21 – 12 December 1975	2.00 m (6 ft 7 in)	Alba Berlin	(Germany)
PF	6	Gerrit Terdenge	22 – 30 January 1975	2.05 m (6 ft 9 in)	California State University, Fresno	(United States)
G	7	Vladimir Bogojević	21 – 1 January 1976	1.96 m (6 ft 5 in)	Gießen 46ers	(Germany)
G	8	Denis Wucherer	24 – 7 May 1973	1.95 m (6 ft 5 in)	Bayer Giants Leverkusen	(Germany)
F	9	Henning Harnisch	29 – 15 April 1968	2.02 m (6 ft 8 in)	Alba Berlin	(Germany)
C	10	Sascha Hupmann	27 – 21 April 1970	2.16 m (7 ft 1 in)	Alba Berlin	(Germany)
C	11	Jürgen Malbeck	23 – 5 April 1974	2.15 m (7 ft 1 in)	Hawaii Pacific University	(United States)
C	12	Patrick Femerling	22 – 4 March 1975	2.15 m (7 ft 1 in)	University of Washington	(United States)
PF	13	Ademola Okulaja	21 – 10 July 1975	2.06 m (6 ft 9 in)	University of North Carolina at Chapel Hill	(United States)
C	14	Tim Nees	25 – 30 October 1971	2.09 m (6 ft 10 in)	Bayer Giants Leverkusen	(Germany)
C	15	Alexander Kühl	24 – 7 January 1973	2.15 m (7 ft 1 in)	University of North Carolina at Charlotte	(United States)

Head coach

- (Serbia and Montenegro) Vladislav Lučić

Legend

- Club – describes last
  club before the tournament
- Age – describes age
  on 24 June 1997

=== Spain ===
Spain men's national basketball team roster
Players
Coaches

Pos.	No.	Name	Age – Date of birth	Height	Club
G	4	Alberto Angulo	27 – 12 June 1970	1.96 m (6 ft 5 in)	Real Madrid	(Spain)
PG	5	José Luis Galilea	24 – 9 July 1972	1.87 m (6 ft 2 in)	FC Barcelona	(Spain)
PG	6	Tomás Jofresa	27 – 25 January 1970	1.84 m (6 ft 0 in)	CB Málaga	(Spain)
C	7	Juan Antonio Orenga	30 – 29 July 1966	2.06 m (6 ft 9 in)	Real Madrid	(Spain)
PG	8	Ignacio Rodríguez	26 – 2 September 1970	1.86 m (6 ft 1 in)	CB Málaga	(Spain)
F	9	Mike Smith	33 – 10 September 1963	1.98 m (6 ft 6 in)	Real Madrid	(Spain)
G	10	Roger Esteller	24 – 6 July 1972	1.91 m (6 ft 3 in)	FC Barcelona	(Spain)
F	11	Alberto Herreros	28 – 20 April 1969	2.00 m (6 ft 7 in)	Real Madrid	(Spain)
F	12	José Antonio Paraíso	26 – 20 April 1971	2.03 m (6 ft 8 in)	Cáceres CB	(Spain)
C	13	Ferran Martínez	29 – 25 April 1968	2.12 m (6 ft 11 in)	Panathinaikos	(Greece)
C	14	Alfonso Reyes	25 – 19 September 1971	2.02 m (6 ft 8 in)	CB Málaga	(Spain)
C	15	Roberto Dueñas	21 – 1 November 1975	2.21 m (7 ft 3 in)	FC Barcelona	(Spain)

Head coach

- Lolo Sainz

Legend

- Club – describes last
  club before the tournament
- Age – describes age
  on 24 June 1997

=== Ukraine ===
Ukraine men's national basketball team roster
Players
Coaches

Pos.	No.	Name	Age – Date of birth	Height	Club
C	4	Oleksandr Okunsky	25 – 13 July 1971	2.14 m (7 ft 0 in)
C	5	Grigorij Khizhnyak	22 – 16 July 1974
PF	6	Leonid Laylo	23 – 31 August 1973	2.06 m (6 ft 9 in)
PF	7	Ihor Molchanov	27 – 6 September 1969	2.07 m (6 ft 9 in)
C	8	Victor Savchenko	27 – 16 February 1970
PF	9	Alexander Lokhmanchuk	24 – 28 May 1973	2.04 m (6 ft 8 in)	BC Budivelnyk	(Ukraine)
F	10	Denis Zhuravlov	26 – 30 April 1971
F	11	Roman Rubchenko	23 – 6 January 1974
G	12	Vadym Pudzyrey	27 – 5 November 1969
G	13	Yevheniy Murzin	31 – 24 September 1965
PG	14	Dmytro Bazelevsky	26 – 28 December 1970
PG	15	Ihor Kharchenko	28 – 11 May 1969

Head coach

- Zaurbek Khromaev

Legend

- Club – describes last
  club before the tournament
- Age – describes age
  on 24 June 1997
