= EuroBasket 1997 =

International basketball event

Campeonato Europeo de Baloncesto Masculino de 1997

Tournament details
- Host country: Spain
- Dates: 24 June – 6 July
- Teams: 16
- Venues: 3 (in 2 host cities)

Final positions
- Champions: Yugoslavia (2nd title)
- Runners-up: Italy
- Third place: Russia
- Fourth place: Greece

Tournament statistics
- MVP: (Federal Republic of Yugoslavia) Aleksandar Đorđević
- Top scorer: (Israel) Oded Kattash (22.0 points per game)

The 1997 FIBA European Championship, commonly called FIBA EuroBasket 1997, was the 30th FIBA EuroBasket regional basketball championship held by FIBA Europe, which also served as Europe qualifier for the 1998 FIBA World Championship, giving a berth to the top four (or five, depending on Greece reaching one of the top four places) teams in the final standings. It was held in Spain between 24 June and 6 July 1997. Sixteen national teams entered the event under the auspices of FIBA Europe, the sport's regional governing body. The cities of Badalona, Barcelona and Girona hosted the tournament. Serbia won its second FIBA European title (seventh FIBA European title under the name of Yugoslavia), by defeating Italy with a 61–49 score in the final. Serbia's Saša Đorđević was voted the tournament's MVP.

== Venues ==
| Location | Picture | City | Arena | Capacity | Status | Round |
|---|---|---|---|---|---|---|
| EuroBasket 1997 is located in Spain | | Badalona | Palau Municipal d'Esports de Badalona | 12,760 | Opened in 1991 | Groups C, D and F Thirteenth-to-sixteenth-place playoffs |
| EuroBasket 1997 is located in Spain | | Barcelona | Palau Sant Jordi | 17,000 | Opened in 1990 | Knockout stage and Final; Fifth-to-eighth-place playoffs Ninth-to-twelfth-place playoffs |
| EuroBasket 1997 is located in Spain | | Girona | Palau Girona-Fontajau | 5,049 | Opened in 1993 | Groups A, B and E |

== Qualification ==
| Competition | Date | Vacancies | Qualified |
|---|---|---|---|
| Host nation | – | 1 | Spain |
| Champions from EuroBasket 1995 | 21 June – 2 July 1995 | 1 | Yugoslavia |
| Qualified through Qualifying Round | 22 May 1996 – 28 February 1997 | 14 | Bosnia and Herzegovina; Croatia; France; Germany; Greece; Israel; Italy; Latvia; Lithuania; Poland; Russia; Slovenia; Turkey; Ukraine |

== Format ==
- The teams were split in four groups of four teams each where they played a round robin. The top three teams from each group advance to the second stage.
- In the second stage, two groups of six teams were formed and played a round robin. The results between teams that faced during the preliminary round are carried over. The top four teams from each group in the second stage advance to the knockout quarterfinals to compete for the Championship. The winners in the semifinals compete for the European Championship, while the losers from the semifinals play a consolation game for the third place.
- The losers in the quarterfinals compete in a separate bracket to define 5th through 8th place in the final standings.
- The four teams eliminated in the second stage compete in another bracket to define 9th through 12th place in the final standings.
- The four teams eliminated in the preliminary round compete in another bracket to define 13th through 16th place in the final standings.

== Preliminary round ==
| Qualified for the second round |

Times given below are in Central European Summer Time (UTC+2).

=== Group A ===
| Team | Pld | W | L | PF | PA | PD | Pts |
|---|---|---|---|---|---|---|---|
| Greece | 3 | 3 | 0 | 226 | 200 | +26 | 6 |
| Russia | 3 | 2 | 1 | 224 | 185 | +39 | 5 |
| Turkey | 3 | 1 | 2 | 178 | 223 | −45 | 4 |
| Bosnia and Herzegovina | 3 | 0 | 3 | 193 | 213 | −20 | 3 |

25 June
16:00

Boxscore

| Bosnia and Herzegovina | 55–65 | Russia |
Scoring by half: 21–37, 34–28
| Pts: Marković 20; Rebs: Bukva 6 Asts: Bećiragić 4 | | Pts: Karasev 22; Rebs: Karasev 6 Asts: Karasev, Nosov 3 |

Palau Girona-Fontajau, Girona
Attendance: 1,500
Referees: Víctor Mas (ESP), Philippe Leemann (SUI)

25 June
18:00

Boxscore

| Greece | 74–52 | Turkey |
Scoring by half: 39–23, 35–29
| Pts: Oikonomou 16; Rebs: Papanikolaou 7 Asts: Christodoulou 6 | | Pts: Ene, Sarıca 14; Rebs: Türkcan 6 Asts: Tunçeri 2 |

Palau Girona-Fontajau, Girona
Attendance: 2,500
Referees: Gennaro Colucci (ITA), Peter Klingbiel (GER)

26 June
16:00

Boxscore

| Turkey | 70–62 | Bosnia and Herzegovina |
Scoring by half: 29–26, 41–36
| Pts: Sarıca 17; Rebs: Türkcan 7 Asts: Ene 5 | | Pts: Firić, Marković 17; Rebs: Bukva 6 Asts: Bećiragić 7 |

Palau Girona-Fontajau, Girona
Attendance: 1,500
Referees: Krzysztof Koralewski (POL), Volodymyr Drabikovskyi (UKR)

26 June
18:00

Boxscore

| Russia | 72–74 | Greece |
Scoring by half: 33–43, 39–31
| Pts: Kudelin 21; Rebs: Kisurin 9 Asts: Karasev 5 | | Pts: Oikonomou, Rentzias 16; Rebs: Rentzias 5 Asts: Koronios 5 |

Palau Girona-Fontajau, Girona
Attendance: 2,500
Referees: Viliam Koller (SVK), Danko Radić (CRO)

27 June
16:00

Boxscore

| Russia | 87–56 | Turkey |
Scoring by half: 50–24, 37–32
| Pts: Karasev 15; Rebs: Panov, Pashutin 4 Asts: Karasev, Panov 4 | | Pts: Türkcan 14; Rebs: Türkcan 10; Asts: Evliyaoğlu, Tunçeri 2 |

Palau Girona-Fontajau, Girona
Attendance: 1,500
Referees: Tomislav Jovančić (YUG), Víctor Mas (ESP)

27 June
18:00

Boxscore

| Greece | 78–76 | Bosnia and Herzegovina |
Scoring by half: 42–34, 36–42
| Pts: Papanikolaou 20; Rebs: Papanikolaou 5 Asts: Sigalas 3 | | Pts: Marković 26; Rebs: Bukva 4 Asts: Firić 3 |

Palau Girona-Fontajau, Girona
Attendance: 2,000
Referees: Peter Klingbiel (GER), Agnis Perkons (LAT)

=== Group B ===
| Team | Pld | W | L | PF | PA | PD | Pts |
|---|---|---|---|---|---|---|---|
| Lithuania | 3 | 3 | 0 | 245 | 215 | +30 | 6 |
| Israel | 3 | 2 | 1 | 217 | 225 | −8 | 5 |
| France | 3 | 1 | 2 | 250 | 257 | −7 | 4 |
| Slovenia | 3 | 0 | 3 | 210 | 225 | −15 | 3 |

25 June
20:30

Boxscore

| Slovenia | 75–80 | France |
Scoring by half: 34–37, 41–43
| Pts: Zdovc 16; Rebs: Nesterovič 10; Asts: Zdovc 3 | | Pts: Foirest, Gadou 15; Rebs: Julian 9 Asts: Sciarra 5 |

Palau Girona-Fontajau, Girona
Attendance: 2,500
Referees: Krzysztof Koralewski (POL), Viliam Koller (SVK)

25 June
22:30

Boxscore

| Lithuania | 75–60 | Israel |
Scoring by half: 30–31, 45–29
| Pts: Einikis, Karnišovas 17; Rebs: Karnišovas 9 Asts: Karnišovas 6 | | Pts: Kattash 25; Rebs: Steinhauer 7 Asts: Kattash 3 |

Palau Girona-Fontajau, Girona
Attendance: 1,500
Referees: Danko Radić (CRO), Tomislav Jovančić (YUG)

26 June
20:30

Boxscore

| France | 88–94 | Lithuania |
Scoring by half: 42–49, 46–45
| Pts: Bonato 24; Rebs: Dubos 6 Asts: Sciarra 8 | | Pts: Einikis 31; Rebs: Einikis 13; Asts: Karnišovas, Lukminas 4 |

Palau Girona-Fontajau, Girona
Attendance: 1,500
Referees: Gennaro Colucci (ITA), Peter Klingbiel (GER)

26 June
22:30

Boxscore

| Israel | 69–68 | Slovenia |
Scoring by half: 36–40, 33–28
| Pts: Steinhauer 22; Rebs: Henefeld 6 Asts: Kattash 4 | | Pts: Alibegović 18; Rebs: Nesterovič 13; Asts: 3 Players 3 |

Palau Girona-Fontajau, Girona
Attendance: 2,000
Referees: Víctor Mas (ESP), Agnis Perkons (LAT)

27 June
20:30

Boxscore

| France | 82–88 | Israel |
Scoring by half: 42–42, 40–46
| Pts: Bonato 21; Rebs: Dubos 6 Asts: Sciarra 5 | | Pts: Kattash 34; Rebs: Steinhauer 6 Asts: Kattash 4 |

Palau Girona-Fontajau, Girona
Attendance: 2,000
Referees: Vilim Koller (SVK), Volodymyr Drabikovskyi (UKR)

27 June
22:30

Boxscore

| Lithuania | 76–67 | Slovenia |
Scoring by half: 41–37, 35–30
| Pts: Karnišovas 16; Rebs: Einikis 7 Asts: Lukminas 8 | | Pts: Alibegović 17; Rebs: Nesterovič 9 Asts: Daneu 2 |

Palau Girona-Fontajau, Girona
Attendance: 2,000
Referees: Krzysztof Koralewski (POL), Philippe Leemann (SUI)

=== Group C ===
| Team | Pld | W | L | PF | PA | PD | Pts |
|---|---|---|---|---|---|---|---|
| Italy | 3 | 3 | 0 | 239 | 209 | +30 | 6 |
| Yugoslavia | 3 | 2 | 1 | 281 | 239 | +42 | 5 |
| Poland | 3 | 1 | 2 | 227 | 263 | −36 | 4 |
| Latvia | 3 | 0 | 3 | 243 | 279 | −36 | 3 |

25 June
16:00

Boxscore

| Latvia | 75–85 | Italy |
Scoring by half: 34–46, 41–39
| Pts: Bagatskis 23; Rebs: Bagatskis 6 Asts: Miglinieks 4 | | Pts: Bonora 15; Rebs: Frosini 6 Asts: Bonora 6 |

Palau Municipal d'Esports de Badalona, Badalona
Attendance: 1,000
Referees: Carl Jungebrand (FIN), Almir Akšamija (BIH)

25 June
18:00

Boxscore

| Yugoslavia | 104–76 | Poland |
Scoring by half: 47–41, 57–35
| Pts: Rebrača 19; Rebs: Topić 8 Asts: Đorđević 4 | | Pts: Tomczyk, Wójcik 13; Rebs: 3 Players 4 Asts: Pluta 3 |

Palau Municipal d'Esports de Badalona, Badalona
Attendance: 2,000
Referees: Romualdas Brazauskas (LTU), Aleksander Gorshkov (RUS)

26 June
16:00

Boxscore

| Poland | 86–79 | Latvia |
Scoring by half: 50–36, 36–43
| Pts: Wójcik 21; Rebs: Wójcik 7 Asts: Zieliński 4 | | Pts: Štelmahers 18; Rebs: Bondarenko, Miglinieks 6 Asts: Miglinieks 6 |

Palau Municipal d'Esports de Badalona, Badalona
Attendance: 1,000
Referees: Iztok Rems (SLO), Recep Ankaralı(TUR)

26 June
22:30

Boxscore

| Italy | 74–69 | Yugoslavia |
Scoring by half: 42–35, 32–34
| Pts: Myers 24; Rebs: Frosini 5 Asts: Bonora 3 | | Pts: Đorđević 29; Rebs: Bodiroga 4 Asts: Đorđević 4 |

Palau Municipal d'Esports de Badalona, Badalona
Attendance: 3,500
Referees: Reuven Virovnik (ISR), Bruno Gasperin (FRA)

27 June
18:00

Boxscore

| Yugoslavia | 108–89 | Latvia |
Scoring by half: 51–41, 57–48
| Pts: Đorđević 22; Rebs: Rebrača 8 Asts: Đorđević 8 | | Pts: Bagatskis 25; Rebs: Bondarenko 7 Asts: Štelmahers 6 |

Palau Municipal d'Esports de Badalona, Badalona
Attendance: 1,000
Referees: Carl Jungebrand (FIN), Nikolaos Pitsilkas (GRE)

27 June
22:30

Boxscore

| Italy | 80–65 | Poland |
Scoring by half: 46–36, 34–29
| Pts: Myers 19; Rebs: Fučka 8 Asts: Myers 6 | | Pts: Zieliński 13; Rebs: Szybilski 6 Asts: Zieliński 4 |

Palau Municipal d'Esports de Badalona, Badalona
Attendance: 3,500
Referees: Romualdas Brazauskas (LTU), Kamen Toshev (BUL)

=== Group D ===
| Team | Pld | W | L | PF | PA | PD | Pts | Tie |
|---|---|---|---|---|---|---|---|---|
| Spain | 3 | 3 | 0 | 227 | 184 | +43 | 6 | |
| Croatia | 3 | 1 | 2 | 234 | 228 | +6 | 4 | 1–1, +13 |
| Germany | 3 | 1 | 2 | 195 | 202 | −7 | 4 | 1–1, +1 |
| Ukraine | 3 | 1 | 2 | 209 | 251 | −42 | 4 | 1–1, −14 |

25 June
20:30

Boxscore

| Ukraine | 54–82 | Spain |
Scoring by half: 25–45, 29–37
| Pts: Bazelevsky 15; Rebs: Molchanov 3 Asts: Murzin 4 | | Pts: Martínez 16; Rebs: Reyes 8 Asts: 4 Players 3 |

Palau Municipal d'Esports de Badalona, Badalona
Attendance: 3,000
Referees: Iztok Rems (SLO), Bruno Gasperin (FRA)

25 June
22:30

Boxscore

| Croatia | 75–55 | Germany |
Scoring by half: 45–26, 30–29
| Pts: Kelečević 19; Rebs: Kelečević 7 Asts: Mulaomerović 9 | | Pts: Wucherer 20; Rebs: Femerling 7 Asts: Harnisch 3 |

Palau Municipal d'Esports de Badalona, Badalona
Attendance: 1,500
Referees: Reuven Virovnik (ISR), Kamen Toshev (BUL)

26 June
18:00

Boxscore

| Germany | 81–60 | Ukraine |
Scoring by half: 37–28, 44–32
| Pts: Harnisch 18; Rebs: Femerling 7 Asts: Harnisch, Rödl 6 | | Pts: Lokhmanchuk 16; Rebs: Lokhmanchuk 8 Asts: Murzin 3 |

Palau Municipal d'Esports de Badalona, Badalona
Attendance: 2,500
Referees: Nikolaos Pitsilkas (GRE), Almir Akšamija (BIH)

26 June
20:30

Boxscore

| Spain | 78–71 | Croatia |
Scoring by half: 41–45, 37–26
| Pts: Smith 24; Rebs: Smith 7 Asts: Jofresa 3 | | Pts: Mulaomerović 16; Rebs: Prkačin 5 Asts: Mulaomerović 5 |

Palau Municipal d'Esports de Badalona, Badalona
Attendance: 5,000
Referees: Carl Jungebrand (FIN), Romualdas Brazauskas (LTU)

27 June
16:00

Boxscore

| Croatia | 88–95 | Ukraine |
Scoring by half: 39–47, 49–48
| Pts: Mulaomerović 23; Rebs: 3 Players 4 Asts: Mulaomerović 8 | | Pts: Lokhmanchuk 19; Rebs: Khyzhniak 5 Asts: Bazelevsky 4 |

Palau Municipal d'Esports de Badalona, Badalona
Attendance: 1,000
Referees: Bruno Gasperin (FRA), Recep Ankaralı (TUR)

27 June
20:30

Boxscore

| Spain | 67–59 | Germany |
Scoring by half: 34–32, 33–27
| Pts: Jofresa 14; Rebs: Orenga 7 Asts: Jofresa 5 | | Pts: Rödl 17; Rebs: Hupmann 12; Asts: Rödl 5 |

Palau Municipal d'Esports de Badalona, Badalona
Attendance: 6,000
Referees: Reuven Virovnik (ISR), Aleksander Gorshkov (RUS)

== Second round ==
| Qualified for the quarterfinals |

=== Group E ===
| Team | Pld | W | L | PF | PA | PD | Pts |
|---|---|---|---|---|---|---|---|
| Greece | 5 | 5 | 0 | 386 | 343 | +43 | 10 |
| Russia | 5 | 4 | 1 | 432 | 343 | +89 | 9 |
| Lithuania | 5 | 3 | 2 | 392 | 399 | −7 | 8 |
| Turkey | 5 | 2 | 3 | 356 | 396 | −40 | 7 |
| Israel | 5 | 1 | 4 | 370 | 410 | −40 | 6 |
| France | 5 | 0 | 5 | 392 | 437 | −45 | 5 |

29 June
18:00

Boxscore

| Turkey | 81–71 | Israel |
Scoring by half: 26–35, 55–36
| Pts: Ene 19; Rebs: Türkcan 7 Asts: Ene 5 | | Pts: Steinhauer 23; Rebs: Steinhauer 8 Asts: Henefeld 5 |

Palau Girona-Fontajau, Girona
Attendance: 3,000
Referees: Danko Radić (CRO), Tomislav Jovančić (YUG)

29 June
20:30

Boxscore

| Russia | 93–80 | France |
Scoring by half: 49–40, 44–40
| Pts: Fetisov 17; Rebs: Panov 4 Asts: Babkov, Karasev 4 | | Pts: Julian 17; Rebs: Julian 8 Asts: Gadou 3 |

Palau Girona-Fontajau, Girona
Attendance: 4,000
Referees: Krzysztof Koralewski (POL), Almir Akšamija (BIH)

29 June
22:30

Boxscore

| Greece | 73–66 | Lithuania |
Scoring by half: 34–28, 39–38
| Pts: Papanikolaou 15; Rebs: Rentzias, Papanikolaou 8 Asts: Patavoukas 2 | | Pts: Štombergas 16; Rebs: Einikis 8 Asts: 3 Players 4 |

Palau Girona-Fontajau, Girona
Attendance: 4,000
Referees: Iztok Rems (SLO), Gennaro Colucci (ITA)

30 June
18:00

Boxscore

| Israel | 69–87 | Russia |
Scoring by half: 31–43, 38–44
| Pts: Kattash, Shelef 14; Rebs: Steinhauer 6 Asts: Henefeld 3 | | Pts: Fetisov 16; Rebs: Mikhaylov 7 Asts: Babkov 3 |

Palau Girona-Fontajau, Girona
Attendance: 3,000
Referees: Víctor Mas (ESP), Gennaro Colucci (ITA)

30 June
20:30

Boxscore

| France | 71–80 | Greece |
Scoring by half: 33–37, 38–43
| Pts: Bonato 16; Rebs: Foirest, Risacher 6 Asts: Sciarra 5 | | Pts: Alvertis 17; Rebs: 3 Players 5 Asts: Christodoulou 4 |

Palau Girona-Fontajau, Girona
Attendance: 3,500
Referees: Tomislav Jovančić (YUG), Peter Klingbiel (GER)

30 June
22:30

Boxscore

| Lithuania | 93–85 | Turkey |
Scoring by half: 45–39, 48–46
| Pts: Karnišovas 27; Rebs: Einikis 6 Asts: Adomaitis 7 | | Pts: Kutluay 32; Rebs: Türkcan 4 Asts: Ene, Kutluay 4 |

Palau Girona-Fontajau, Girona
Attendance: 3,000
Referees: Kzysztof Koralewski (POL), Almir Akšamija (BIH)

1 July
18:00

Boxscore

| Greece | 85–82 | Israel |
Scoring by half: 44–48, 41–34
| Pts: Oikonomou 20; Rebs: Rentzias 6 Asts: Oikonomou 3 | | Pts: Kattash 29; Rebs: Sheffer 6 Asts: Sheffer 5 |

Palau Girona-Fontajau, Girona
Attendance: 3,000
Referees: Krzysztof Koralewski (POL), Almir Akšamija (BIH)

1 July
20:30

Boxscore

| Turkey | 82–71 | France |
Scoring by half: 33–31, 49–40
| Pts: Kutluay 21; Rebs: Türkcan 9 Asts: Kutluay 5 | | Pts: Julian 16; Rebs: Gadou 9 Asts: Fauthoux, Gadou 3 |

Palau Girona-Fontajau, Girona
Attendance: 3,500
Referees: Danko Radić (CRO), Gennaro Colucci (ITA)

1 July
22:30

Boxscore

| Russia | 93–64 | Lithuania |
Scoring by half: 50–37, 43–27
| Pts: Fetisov 19; Rebs: Fetisov 5 Asts: Karasev 4 | | Pts: Karnišovas 17; Rebs: Karnišovas 5 Asts: Jasikevičius 3 |

Palau Girona-Fontajau, Girona
Attendance: 3,000
Referees: Kzysztof Koralewski (POL), Almir Akšamija (BIH)

=== Group F ===
| Team | Pld | W | L | PF | PA | PD | Pts |
|---|---|---|---|---|---|---|---|
| Italy | 5 | 5 | 0 | 358 | 324 | +34 | 10 |
| Yugoslavia | 5 | 4 | 1 | 404 | 355 | +49 | 9 |
| Spain | 5 | 3 | 2 | 379 | 333 | +46 | 8 |
| Poland | 5 | 2 | 3 | 365 | 440 | −75 | 7 |
| Croatia | 5 | 1 | 4 | 352 | 348 | +4 | 6 |
| Germany | 5 | 0 | 5 | 325 | 383 | −58 | 5 |

29 June
18:00

Boxscore

| Yugoslavia | 88–73 | Germany |
Scoring by half: 47–30, 41–43
| Pts: Savić 16; Rebs: Rebrača, Tomašević 6 Asts: Bodiroga 6 | | Pts: Hupmann 15; Rebs: Hupmann 7 Asts: Rödl 6 |

Palau Municipal d'Esports de Badalona, Badalona
Attendance: 2,000
Referees: Carl Jungebrand (FIN), Agnis Perkons (LAT)

29 June
20:30

Boxscore

| Italy | 63–60 | Spain |
Scoring by half: 25–36, 38–24
| Pts: Myers 20; Rebs: Pittis 4 Asts: Pittis 7 | | Pts: Herreros 15; Rebs: Dueñas 7 Asts: Jofresa 4 |

Palau Municipal d'Esports de Badalona, Badalona
Attendance: 8,000
Referees: Viliam Koller (SVK), Nikolaos Pitsilkas (GRE)

29 June
22:30

Boxscore

| Poland | 77–76 | Croatia |
Scoring by half: 38–50, 39–26
| Pts: Zieliński 16; Rebs: Jankowski, Tomczyk 5 Asts: Zieliński 6 | | Pts: Rimac 20; Rebs: Kelečević 7 Asts: Mulaomerović 8 |

Palau Municipal d'Esports de Badalona, Badalona
Attendance: 4,000
Referees: Reuven Virovnik (ISR), Volodymyr Drabikovskyi (UKR)

30 June
18:00

Boxscore

| Germany | 62–67 | Italy |
Scoring by half: 28–27, 34–40
| Pts: Rödl 20; Rebs: Bogojevič, Femerling 6 Asts: Rödl 4 | | Pts: Fučka, Myers 13; Rebs: Fučka 5 Asts: Bonora 3 |

Palau Municipal d'Esports de Badalona, Badalona
Attendance: 5,000
Referees: Philippe Leemann (SUI), Volodymyr Drabikovskyi (UKR)

30 June
20:30

Boxscore

| Spain | 104–61 | Poland |
Scoring by half: 52–29, 52–32
| Pts: Angulo, Reyes 21; Rebs: Reyes 8 Asts: Rodríguez 8 | | Pts: Wójcik, Zieliński 10; Rebs: Darnikowski 5 Asts: Zieliński 4 |

Palau Municipal d'Esports de Badalona, Badalona
Attendance: 5,000
Referees: Bruno Gasperin (FRA), Kamen Toshev (BUL)

30 June
22:30

Boxscore

| Croatia | 62–64 | Yugoslavia |
Scoring by half: 31–22, 31–42
| Pts: Rimac 22; Rebs: Pejčinović 7 Asts: Rimac 4 | | Pts: Đorđević 19; Rebs: Rebrača 8 Asts: Đorđević, Obradović 3 |

Palau Municipal d'Esports de Badalona, Badalona
Attendance: 4,500
Referees: Nikolaos Pitsilkas (GRE), Romualdas Brazauskas (LTU)

1 July
18:00

Boxscore

| Poland | 86–76 | Germany |
Scoring by half: 42–35, 44–41
| Pts: Tomczyk 20; Rebs: Wójcik 8 Asts: Tomczyk, Zieliński 4 | | Pts: Rödl 15; Rebs: Hupmann 7 Asts: Rödl 7 |

Palau Municipal d'Esports de Badalona, Badalona
Attendance: 1,500
Referees: Romualdas Brazauskas (LTU), Nikolaos Pitsilkas (GRE)

1 July
20:30

Boxscore

| Yugoslavia | 79–70 | Spain |
Scoring by half: 39–35, 40–35
| Pts: Lončar 17; Rebs: Rebrača 5 Asts: Đorđević 5 | | Pts: Reyes 20; Rebs: Reyes 8 Asts: Rodríguez, Smith 3 |

Palau Municipal d'Esports de Badalona, Badalona
Attendance: 7,000
Referees: Carl Jungebrand (FIN), Reuven Virovnik (ISR)

1 July
22:30

Boxscore

| Italy | 74–68 | Croatia |
Scoring by half: 38–36, 36–32
| Pts: Myers 19; Rebs: Frosini 4 Asts: Coldebella 6 | | Pts: Rimac 19; Rebs: Kovačić 8 Asts: Mulaomerović 4 |

Palau Municipal d'Esports de Badalona, Badalona
Attendance: 1,000
Referees: Viliam Koller (SVK), Volodymyr Drabikovsyi (UKR)

== Knockout stage ==
=== Championship bracket ===
Quarter-finals
4 July – 16:00
Greece | 72
Poland | 62
4 July – 18:00
Lithuania | 60
Yugoslavia | 75
4 July – 20:30
Russia | 70
Spain | 67
4 July – 22:30
Turkey | 43
Italy | 66

Semi-finals
5 July – 20:30
Greece | 80
Yugoslavia | 88
5 July – 22:30
Russia | 65
Italy | 67

Final
6 July – 21:30
Yugoslavia | 61
Italy | 49
Third place
6 July – 19:15
Greece | 77
Russia | 97

==== Quarterfinals ====
4 July
16:00

Boxscore

| Greece | 72–62 | Poland |
Scoring by half: 38–39, 34–23
| Pts: Koronios 18; Rebs: Papanikolaou 8 Asts: Christodoulou, Koronios 3 | | Pts: Tomczyk 16; Rebs: Szybilski 7 Asts: Zieliński 4 |

Palau Sant Jordi, Barcelona
Attendance: 2,000
Referees: Carl Jungebrand (FIN), Danko Radić (CRO)

4 July
18:00

Boxscore

| Lithuania | 60–75 | Yugoslavia |
Scoring by half: 27–31, 33–44
| Pts: Karnišovas 18; Rebs: Einikis 5 Asts: Adomaitis 4 | | Pts: Danilović 21; Rebs: Topić 8 Asts: Lončar 4 |

Palau Sant Jordi, Barcelona
Attendance: 8,000
Referees: Viliam Koller (SVK), Philippe Leemann (SUI)

4 July
20:30

Boxscore

| Russia | 70–67 | Spain |
Scoring by half: 29–37, 41–30
| Pts: Fetisov 21; Rebs: Fetisov 7 Asts: Babkov 4 | | Pts: Orenga 17; Rebs: Smith 7 Asts: Smith 3 |

Palau Sant Jordi, Barcelona
Attendance: 10,000
Referees: Iztok Rems (SLO), Nikolaos Pitsilkas (GRE)

4 July
22:30

Boxscore

| Turkey | 43–66 | Italy |
Scoring by half: 20–28, 23–38
| Pts: Erdenay 12; Rebs: 3 Players 2 Asts: Ene 2 | | Pts: Marconato 16; Rebs: Marconato 12; Asts: Bonora 5 |

Palau Sant Jordi, Barcelona
Attendance: 5,500
Referees: Tomislav Jovančić (YUG), Bruno Gasperin (FRA)

==== Semifinals ====
5 July
20:30

Boxscore

| Greece | 80–88 | Yugoslavia |
Scoring by half: 39–43, 41–45
| Pts: Koronios 14; Rebs: Papanikolaou 6 Asts: 4 Players 1 | | Pts: Bodiroga 22; Rebs: Tomašević 9 Asts: Đorđević 6 |

Palau Sant Jordi, Barcelona
Attendance: 8,000
Referees: Romualdas Brazauskas (LTU), Krzysztof Koralewski (POL)

5 July
22:30

Boxscore

| Russia | 65–67 | Italy |
Scoring by half: 38–33, 27–34
| Pts: Panov 17; Rebs: Mikhaylov 6 Asts: 4 Players 2 | | Pts: Myers 19; Rebs: Marconato 10; Asts: Bonora 6 |

Palau Sant Jordi, Barcelona
Attendance: 8,000
Referees: Danko Radić (CRO), Viliam Koller (SVK)

==== Third place ====
6 July
19:15

Boxscore

| Greece | 77–97 | Russia |
Scoring by half: 43–43, 34–54
| Pts: Rentzias 28; Rebs: Rentzias 5 Asts: Koronios 4 | | Pts: Mikhaylov 35; Rebs: Mikhaylov 15; Asts: Mikhaylov 4 |

Palau Sant Jordi, Barcelona
Attendance: 5,000
Referees: Reuven Virovnik (ISR), Iztok Rems (SLO)

==== Final ====
6 July
21:30

Boxscore

| Yugoslavia | 61–49 | Italy |
Scoring by half: 28–23, 33–26
| Pts: Bodiroga 14; Rebs: Danilović 5 Asts: Đorđević 4 | | Pts: Myers 17; Rebs: Fučka, Marconato 6 Asts: Coldebella 2 |

Palau Sant Jordi, Barcelona
Attendance: 10,500
Referees: Carl Jungebrand (FIN), Víctor Mas (ESP)

=== 5th to 8th place ===
Classification round
5 July – 16:00
Poland | 55
Lithuania | 76
5 July – 18:00
Spain | 86
Turkey | 71

Fifth place
6 July – 13:00
Lithuania | 93
Spain | 94
Seventh place
6 July – 11:00
Poland | 89
Turkey | 87

5 July
16:00

Boxscore

| Poland | 55–76 | Lithuania |
Scoring by half: 25–41, 30–35
| Pts: Zieliński 15; Rebs: Jankowski 7 Asts: Zieliński 2 | | Pts: Einikis, Karnišovas 21; Rebs: Karnišovas 9 Asts: Lukminas 6 |

Palau Sant Jordi, Barcelona
Attendance: 1,000
Referees: Reuven Virovnik (ISR), Nikolaos Pitsilkas (GRE)

6 July
18:00

Boxscore

| Spain | 86–81 | Turkey |
Scoring by half: 49–36, 37–45
| Pts: Herreros 18; Rebs: Martínez 9 Asts: Jofresa 8 | | Pts: Kutluay 23; Rebs: Türkcan 6 Asts: 3 Players 2 |

Palau Sant Jordi, Barcelona
Attendance: 5,000
Referees: Gennaro Colucci (ITA), Peter Klingbiel (GER)

6 July
11:00

Boxscore

| Poland | 89–87 (OT) | Turkey |
Scoring by half: 43–34, 34–43 Overtime: 12–10
| Pts: Zieliński 17; Rebs: Szybilski 5 Asts: Bacik 7 | | Pts: Kutluay 29; Rebs: Türkcan 15; Asts: 6 Players 2 |

Palau Sant Jordi, Barcelona
Attendance: 1,000
Referees: Bruno Gasperin (FRA), Kamen Toshev (BUL)

6 July
13:00

Boxscore

| Lithuania | 93–94 | Spain |
Scoring by half: 44–40, 49–54
| Pts: Karnišovas 32; Rebs: Žukauskas 11; Asts: Jasikevičius 6 | | Pts: Herreros 20; Rebs: Martínez 6 Asts: Herreros 4 |

Palau Sant Jordi, Barcelona
Attendance: 4,000
Referees: Tomislav Jovančić (YUG), Philippe Leemann (SUI)

=== 9th to 12th place ===
Classification round
4 July – 10:00
Israel | 84
Germany | 75
4 July – 12:00
France | 84
Croatia | 79

Ninth place
5 July – 12:00
Israel | 91
France | 84
Eleventh place
5 July – 10:00
Germany | 93
Croatia | 100

4 July
10:00

Boxscore

| Israel | 84–75 | Germany |
Scoring by half: 39–41, 45–34
| Pts: Kattash 25; Rebs: Kattash 7 Asts: Kattash 5 | | Pts: Rödl, Wucherer 18; Rebs: Femerling 9 Asts: Harnisch 4 |

Palau Sant Jordi, Barcelona
Attendance: 1,500
Referees: Gennaro Colucci (ITA), Aleksander Gorshkov (RUS)

4 July
12:00

Boxscore

| France | 84–79 | Croatia |
Scoring by half: 40–37, 44–42
| Pts: Gadou 27; Rebs: Gadou 4 Asts: Sciarra 5 | | Pts: Rimac 19; Rebs: Kelečević, Prkačin 5 Asts: Mulaomerović 5 |

Palau Sant Jordi, Barcelona
Attendance: 2,000
Referees: Víctor Mas (ESP), Kamen Toshev (BUL)

5 July
10:00

Boxscore

| Germany | 93–100 | Croatia |
Scoring by half: 41–59, 52–41
| Pts: Wucherer 21; Rebs: Femerling 6 Asts: 3 Players 4 | | Pts: Mulaomerović 27; Rebs: Pejčinović 10; Asts: Mulaomerović 11 |

Palau Sant Jordi, Barcelona
Attendance: 1,000
Referees: Philippe Leemann (SUI), Recep Ankaralı (TUR)

5 July
12:00

Boxscore

| Israel | 91–84 | France |
Scoring by half: 43–48, 48–36
| Pts: Kattash 27; Rebs: Steinhauer 12; Asts: Kattash, Steinhauer 4 | | Pts: Risacher 23; Rebs: Dubos 7 Asts: 3 Players 3 |

Palau Sant Jordi, Barcelona
Attendance: 3,000
Referees: Iztok Rems (SLO), Agnis Perkons (LAT)

=== 13th to 16th place ===
Classification round
29 June – 10:00
Bosnia and Herzegovina | 61
Slovenia | 73
29 June – 12:00
Latvia | 76
Ukraine | 84

Thirteenth place
30 June – 12:00
Slovenia | 75
Ukraine | 80
Fifteenth place
30 June – 10:00
Bosnia and Herzegovina | 96
Latvia | 94

29 June
10:00

Boxscore

| Bosnia and Herzegovina | 61–73 | Slovenia |
Scoring by half: 21–46, 40–27
| Pts: Firić 12; Rebs: Alihodžić 4 Asts: Bećiragić 4 | | Pts: Nesterovič 20; Rebs: Nesterovič 8 Asts: Zdovc 4 |

Palau Municipal d'Esports de Badalona, Badalona
Attendance: 1,000
Referees: Bruno Gasperin (FRA), Aleksander Gorshkov (RUS)

29 June
12:00

Boxscore

| Latvia | 76–84 | Ukraine |
Scoring by half: 42–35, 34–49
| Pts: Jansons 17; Rebs: Jansons 8 Asts: Miglinieks, Šneps 3 | | Pts: Lokhmanchuk 21; Rebs: Lokhmanchuk 6 Asts: Bazelevsky 2 |

Palau Municipal d'Esports de Badalona, Badalona
Attendance: 1,500
Referees: Philippe Leemann (SUI), Kamen Toshev (BUL)

30 June
10:00

Boxscore

| Bosnia and Herzegovina | 96–94 | Latvia |
Scoring by half: 32–52, 64–42
| Pts: Marković 44; Rebs: Alihodžić 8 Asts: Alihodžić 3 | | Pts: Bagatskis 33; Rebs: Bagatskis 6 Asts: Miglinieks 10 |

Palau Municipal d'Esports de Badalona, Badalona
Attendance: 1,000
Referees: Reuven Virovnik (ISR), Viliam Koller (SVK)

30 June
12:00

Boxscore

| Slovenia | 75–80 | Ukraine |
Scoring by half: 46–45, 29–35
| Pts: Milič 16; Rebs: Jurković 5 Asts: 3 Players 2 | | Pts: Okunsky 18; Rebs: Okunsky 7 Asts: Pudzyrey 5 |

Palau Municipal d'Esports de Badalona, Badalona
Attendance: 1,000
Referees: Carl Jungebrand (FIN), Recep Ankaralı (TUR)

== Statistical leaders ==
=== Individual Tournament Highs ===
Points

| Pos. | Name | PPG |
|---|---|---|
| 1 | (Israel) Oded Kattash | 22.0 |
| 2 | (Latvia) Ainārs Bagatskis | 21.8 |
| 3 | (Bosnia and Herzegovina) Nenad Marković | 21.4 |
| 4 | (Lithuania) Artūras Karnišovas | 20.7 |
| 4 | (Israel) Tomer Steinhauer | 17.1 |
| 6 | (Lithuania) Gintaras Einikis | 16.9 |
| 7 | (Turkey) İbrahim Kutluay | 16.8 |
| 8 | (Italy) Carlton Myers | 15.8 |
| 8 | (Latvia) Roberts Štelmahers | 15.8 |
| 10 | (France) Yann Bonato | 15.6 |

Rebounds

| Pos. | Name | RPG |
|---|---|---|
| 1 | (Slovenia) Rašho Nesterović | 8.6 |
| 2 | (Turkey) Mirsad Türkcan | 7.3 |
| 3 | (Lithuania) Gintaras Einikis | 6.4 |
| 3 | (Israel) Tomer Steinhauer | 6.4 |
| 5 | (Lithuania) Artūras Karnišovas | 5.9 |
| 6 | (Russia) Mikhail Mikhaylov | 5.6 |
| 6 | (Spain) Alfonso Reyes | 5.6 |
| 8 | (Germany) Patrick Femerling | 5.4 |
| 9 | (Greece) Dimitrios Papanikolaou | 5.0 |
| 9 | (Federal Republic of Yugoslavia) Željko Rebrača | 5.0 |
| 9 | (Latvia) Andrejs Bondarenko | 5.0 |

Assists

| Pos. | Name | APG |
|---|---|---|
| 1 | (Croatia) Damir Mulaomerović | 7.3 |
| 2 | (Latvia) Raimonds Miglinieks | 6.4 |
| 3 | (Lithuania) Darius Lukminas | 5.6 |
| 4 | (Federal Republic of Yugoslavia) Saša Đorđević | 4.5 |
| 5 | (Germany) Henrik Rödl | 4.4 |
| 6 | (France) Laurent Sciarra | 4.3 |
| 7 | (Lithuania) Artūras Karnišovas | 3.9 |
| 8 | (Poland) Maciej Zieliński | 3.8 |
| 9 | (Israel) Oded Kattash | 3.7 |
| 10 | (Bosnia and Herzegovina) Adis Bećiragić | 3.6 |

Steals

| Pos. | Name | SPG |
|---|---|---|
| 1 | (Latvia) Raimonds Miglinieks | 3.8 |
| 2 | (Israel) Oded Kattash | 3.6 |
| 3 | (Latvia) Roberts Štelmahers | 3.2 |
| 4 | (Greece) Angelos Koronios | 3.1 |
| 5 | (Lithuania) Gintaras Einikis | 3.0 |
| 5 | (Russia) Igor Kudelin | 3.0 |
| 5 | (Poland) Maciej Zieliński | 3.0 |
| 5 | (Croatia) Vladan Alanović | 3.0 |
| 5 | (Slovenia) Jure Zdovc | 3.0 |
| 10 | (Italy) Riccardo Pittis | 2.9 |

Minutes

| Pos. | Name | MPG |
|---|---|---|
| 1 | (Israel) Oded Kattash | 38.4 |
| 2 | (Lithuania) Artūras Karnišovas | 36.2 |
| 3 | (Israel) Tomer Steinhauer | 34.5 |
| 4 | (Poland) Maciej Zieliński | 33.7 |
| 5 | (Israel) Nadav Henefeld | 33.6 |
| 6 | (France) Thierry Gadou | 33.3 |
| 7 | (Germany) Denis Wucherer | 33.1 |
| 8 | (Latvia) Raimonds Miglinieks | 32.6 |
| 9 | (Ukraine) Dmytro Bazelevsky | 31.8 |
| 10 | (Germany) Henrik Rödl | 31.5 |

=== Individual Game Highs ===
| Department | Name | Total | Opponent |
|---|---|---|---|
| Points | (Bosnia and Herzegovina) Nenad Marković | 44 | Latvia |
| Rebounds | (Russia) Mikhail Mikhaylov (Turkey) Mirsad Türkcan | 15 | Greece; Poland |
| Assists | (Croatia) Damir Mulaomerović | 11 | Germany |
| Steals | 5 Players | 7 | |
| Turnovers | (Germany) Denis Wucherer | 8 | Croatia |

=== Team Tournament Highs ===
Offensive PPG

| Pos. | Name | PPG |
|---|---|---|
| 1 | Latvia | 82.6 |
| 2 | Yugoslavia | 81.8 |
| 3 | Russia | 81.0 |
| 3 | France | 80.0 |
| 5 | Spain | 78.7 |

Rebounds

| Pos. | Name | RPG |
|---|---|---|
| 1 | Spain | 27.4 |
| 2 | Latvia | 25.0 |
| 2 | Russia | 24.9 |
| 4 | Lithuania | 24.8 |
| 5 | Poland | 24.2 |

Assists

| Pos. | Name | APG |
|---|---|---|
| 1 | Lithuania | 18.0 |
| 2 | Croatia | 15.5 |
| 3 | Yugoslavia | 13.9 |
| 4 | France | 13.6 |
| 5 | Russia | 13.3 |

Steals

| Pos. | Name | SPG |
|---|---|---|
| 1 | Russia | 19.7 |
| 2 | Latvia | 16.8 |
| 3 | Poland | 15.2 |
| 4 | France | 14.8 |
| 5 | Israel | 14.4 |

=== Team Game highs ===
| Department | Name | Total | Opponent |
|---|---|---|---|
| Points | Yugoslavia | 108 | Latvia |
| Rebounds | Italy | 37 | Turkey |
| Assists | Lithuania | 25 | Turkey |
| Steals | Russia | 26 | Bosnia and Herzegovina |
| Field goal percentage | Lithuania | 63.8% (30/47) | Turkey |
| 3-point field goal percentage | Lithuania | 70.0% (7/10) | Turkey |
| Free throw percentage | Israel | 90.3% (10/11) | France |
| Turnovers | Bosnia and Herzegovina | 24 | Slovenia |

== Awards ==
1997 FIBA EuroBasket champions

Yugoslavia
2nd title

1997 FIBA EuroBasket MVP: Sašha Đjorđjević ( (Federal Republic of Yugoslavia) Yugoslavia)

All-Tournament Team
(Federal Republic of Yugoslavia) Saša Đorđević (MVP)
(Poland) Dominik Tomczyk
(Federal Republic of Yugoslavia) Dejan Bodiroga
(Federal Republic of Yugoslavia) Željko Rebrača
(Russia) Mikhail Mikhaylov

== Final standings ==
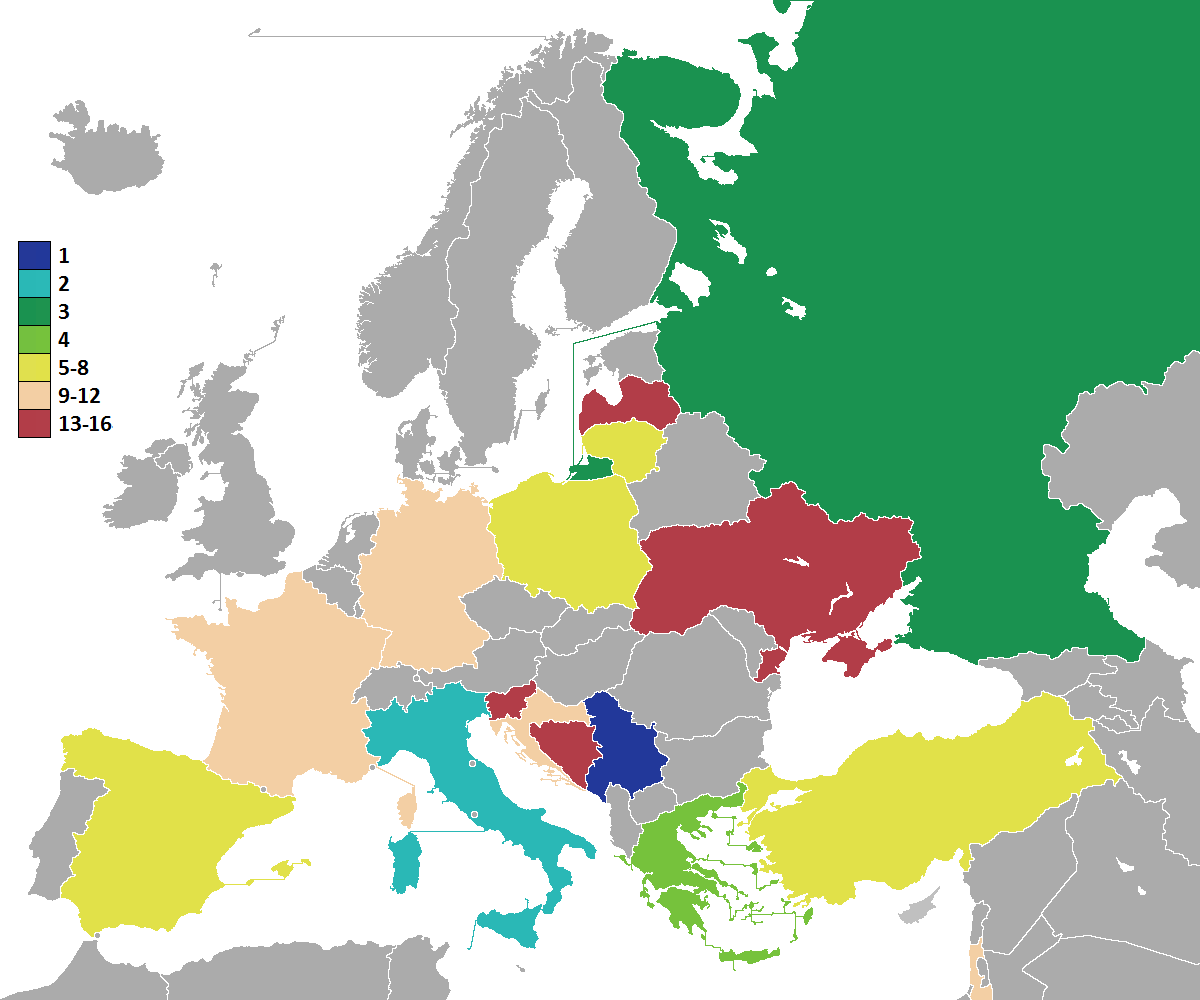
Results

| Qualified for the 1998 FIBA World Championship |
| Qualified for the 1998 FIBA World Championship as host |

| Rank | Team | Record |
|---|---|---|
| 1st place, gold medalist(s) | Yugoslavia | 8–1 |
| 2nd place, silver medalist(s) | Italy | 8–1 |
| 3rd place, bronze medalist(s) | Russia | 7–2 |
| 4 | Greece | 7–2 |
| 5 | Spain | 6–3 |
| 6 | Lithuania | 5–4 |
| 7 | Poland | 4–5 |
| 8 | Turkey | 3–6 |
| 9 | Israel | 4–4 |
| 10 | France | 2–6 |
| 11 | Croatia | 2–6 |
| 12 | Germany | 1–7 |
| 13 | Ukraine | 3–2 |
| 14 | Slovenia | 1–4 |
| 15 | Bosnia and Herzegovina | 1–4 |
| 16 | Latvia | 0–5 |

| 1st | 2nd | 3rd | 4th |
| Yugoslavia Dejan Bodiroga; Predrag Danilović; Saša Obradović; Nikola Lončar; Miroslav Radošević; Miroslav Berić; Aleksandar Đorđević; Željko Rebrača; Nikola Bulatović; Zoran Savić; Dejan Tomašević; Milenko Topić | Italy Claudio Coldebella Davide Bonora Gregor Fučka Riccardo Pittis Denis Marconato Giacomo Galanda Carlton Myers Paolo Moretti Alessandro Abbio Alessandro Frosini Flavio Carera Dan Gay | Russia Vasily Karasev; Igor Kudelin; Igor Kurashov; Evgeni Kisurin; Evgeniy Pashutin; Dmitry Shakulin; Sergei Babkov; Mikhail Mikhaylov; Zakhar Pashutin; Andrei Fetisov; Sergei Panov; Vitaliy Nosov | Greece Georgios Kalaitzis; Kostas Patavoukas; Nikos Boudouris; Dimitrios Papanikolaou; Giorgos Sigalas; Angelos Koronios; Fragiskos Alvertis; Nikos Oikonomou; Christos Myriounis; Giannis Giannoulis; Efthimios Rentzias; Fanis Christodoulou |
