= Tomer Steinhauer =

Israeli basketball player and coach

Tomer Steinhauer תומר שטיינהאור
Personal information
- Born: October 3, 1966 (age 60)
- Listed height: 6 ft 9.5 in (2.07 m)

Career information
- College: South Florida (1988–1989)
- Playing career: 1985–2009
- Position: Center
- Coaching career: 2006–present

Career history

Playing
- 1985–1988: Maccabi Haifa
- 1988–1989: South Florida Bulls
- 1989–1991: Maccabi Haifa
- 1991–1994: Hapoel Tel Aviv
- 1994–1995: Hapoel Holon
- 1995–1996: Maccabi Tel Aviv
- 1996–2000: Maccabi Ra'anana
- 2000–2002: Maccabi Givat Shmuel
- 2002: Ironi Nahariya
- 2003–2004: Maccabi Haifa
- 2008–2009: Hapoel Tiv'on Megiddo

Coaching
- 2016–2019: Maccabi Haifa (assistant)

Career highlights
- Israeli Basketball Premier League MVP (1997)

Tomer Moshe Steinhauer (Hebrew: תומר משה שטיינהאור; born October 3, 1966) is an Israeli professional basketball coach and former professional player. He is currently the assistant coach for Maccabi Haifa of the Liga Leumit. Steinhauer played for the Israel national basketball team in 1986-2001, and was an Israeli Cup winner in 1993 with Hapoel Tel Aviv and Israeli champion in 1996 with Maccabi Tel Aviv. He was the 1997 Israeli Basketball Premier League MVP.

== Biography ==
Tomer Steinhauer began his career as a player of junior teams in Maccabi Haifa B.C. In 1984 he won with Haifa youth team the national youth championship and state cup, and the next year became a part of the main Haifa team. He kept playing in Haifa till 1991 (taking a year in 1988/1999 to study and play at the University of South Florida).

In 1986 he debuted with the Israel national basketball team at the World Championship and finished it with 4 points in 2 games. Between 1991 and 1994 Steinhauer played in Hapoel Tel Aviv B.C. and in 1993 won Israeli Cup with this team. In addition, he three times in a row played with Hapoel in the Israeli championship finals, twice losing to Maccabi Tel Aviv B.C. and once to Hapoel Galil Elyon.

After playing the 1994/1995 season with Hapoel Holon Steinhauer signed a 3-year contract with the leaders of Israeli basketball - Maccabi Tel Aviv. In fact, though, he played with Maccabi only one year, winning the Israeli championship, and then got transferred to Maccabi Ra'anana. Next two years the Tel Aviv club kept paying Steinhauer his salary, thus allowing him to joke that his dreams came true: he gets paid by Maccabi for playing against them. Steinhauer's last season with Ra'anana he once again finished as the national championship finalist, again losing to Tel Aviv. He was the 1997 Israeli Basketball Premier League MVP.

In the late 1990s Steinhauer was one of the leaders of the national team, peaking during the 1997 EuroBasket. At 8 games during this tournament he was amassing 17.1 points on an average, which was the 2nd highest result in the Israeli team (behind only Oded Katash) and 5th highest among all tournament players, and added 6.4 rebounds per game. Overall, he played 13 years with the Israeli national team. Steinhauer was considered one of the best centers in Israeli team history for his ability to play under the rim against more athletically endowed centers of other teams, his refined mid-range shot and willingness to hit an occasional 3-pointer. At the same time he was not one of the most hardworking players and only put up mediocre defense.

In the early 2000s Steinauer's value for his teams started deteriorating. He moved to the Northern Israel, taking root in Kiryat Tiv'on. After playing 19 seasons in Israel's top basketball league (ranked 14th in the all-time list of top league scorers with 5,253 points) he kept playing for several years in the local Tiv'on team in Israeli 3rd- and 2nd-tier leagues, finishing the career at the age of 42 in Hapoel Emeq Yizre'el. For short periods of time Steinhauer worked as assistant coach in Bnei Herzliya and as the head coach of Tiv'on youth teams. In 2016 he was appointed assistant coach of Maccabi Haifa B.C., joining Opher Rakhimi who was appointed head coach.

According to Steinhauer's own words, he was not interested in a business career following retirement because he is averse to financial risk and has enough money from his playing years to afford living in Kiryat Tiv'on. He has three children: two sons and a daughter. For some time Steinhauer got involved in politics, joining Israeli left, and in 2009 ran unsuccessfully in the Israeli legislative election as a member of left-wing party Meretz.

== Statistics of games with Israel national team and in European cups ==
Legend
GP	Games played	MPG	Minutes per game	FG%	Field goal percentage
3P%	3-point field goal percentage	FT%	Free throw percentage	RPG	Rebounds per game
APG	Assists per game	SPG	Steals per game	BPG	Blocks per game
PPG	Points per game	**Bold**	Career high		Led the league

=== World and European championships ===
Year	Tournament	National Team	GP	GS	MPG	FG%	3P%	FT%	RPG	APG	SPG	BPG	PPG
1986	World Championship	Israel	2					100.0					2.0
1987	EuroBasket	Israel	2					0.0					0.0
1993	EuroBasket	Israel	3					75.0					9.7
1997	EuroBasket	Israel	8		34.5	51.4	41.7	68.8	6.4	1.6	2.8	0.0	17.1
1999	EuroBasket	Israel	6		25.5	45.8	11.1	55.6	3.7	1.2	0.5	0.0	9.2

=== European cups ===
Year	Tournament	National Team	GP	GS	MPG	FG%	3P%	FT%	RPG	APG	SPG	BPG	PPG
1991–92	Korać Cup	(Israel) Hapoel Tel Aviv	4		25.3	44.1	0.0	58.8	6.5	0.0	0.5	0.0	10.0
1992–93	FIBA European League	(Israel) Hapoel Tel Aviv	2		38.5	50.0	0.0	86.7	8.5	0.0	0.5	0.0	17.5
1992–93	FIBA European Cup	(Israel) Hapoel Tel Aviv	11		31.9	50.7	50.0	56.3	8.0	1.5	1.0	0.0	15.7
1993–94	FIBA European League	(Israel) Hapoel Tel Aviv	1		19.0	63.6	100.0	100.0	2.0	0.0	2.0	0.0	16.0
1995–96	FIBA European League	(Israel) Maccabi Tel Aviv	13		12.2	57.8	0.0	62.5	2.3	0.4	0.1	0.0	4.8
1997–98	FIBA EuroCup	(Israel) Maccabi Ra'anana	11		33.8	40.5	10.0	73.2	6.8	1.5	1.3	0.0	15.2
1998–99	Korać Cup	(Israel) Maccabi Ra'anana	6		32.7	46.9	28.6	44.8	4.8	1.7	1.5	0.0	12.5
1999–2000	Saporta Cup	(Israel) Maccabi Ra'anana	11		29.2	39.5	18.5	50.0	4.8	1.8	1.0	0.0	10.7

== External sources ==
- Profile and statistics (in Hebrew) at the 'Safsal' Website
