= TV Langen =

- Nickname: Die Giraffen (The Giraffes)
- Leagues: Regionalliga
- Founded: 1862; 163 years ago
- History: TV Langen; 1862–present
- Arena: Georg-Sehring-Halle
- Capacity: 1,100
- Head coach: Markus Kühn
Home	Away

TV Langen, nicknamed Die Giraffen (the Giraffes), is a German basketball club based in Langen, Hesse.

The club men's senior team currently plays in the Regionalliga, the fourth tier of German basketball. Langen has played in the first tier Basketball Bundesliga (BBL) in the seasons of 1981/82, 1985-1988, 1984/85, 1988/89, 1990/91. The club is a cooperation team of the Frankfurt Skyliners, and is especially known for developing young basketball talents. The team's manager has been Jürgen Barth.

== Notable players ==
Former logo of TV Langen

Germany

- Robin Benzing until -'09
- Johannes Herber 3 seasons: '99-'02
- Alex King 1 season: '05-'06
- Denis Wucherer 1 season: '91-'92

Senegal

- Malick Badiane 2 seasons: '01-'03
