= Siniša Kelečević =

Croatian basketball player

Personal information
- Born: April 10, 1970 (age 56) Šibenik, Croatia
- Listed height: 6 ft 10 in (2.08 m)
- Listed weight: 216 lb (98 kg)
- Position: Forward/center

Career highlights
- Israeli Basketball Premier League Quintet (2002)

Siniša Kelečević (born April 10, 1970) is a Croatian former basketball player. He played the forward and center positions. He was named to the 2002 Israeli Basketball Premier League Quintet.

== Biography ==
Kelečević is from Šibenik, Croatia. He is 6 ft 10 in (208 cm) tall, and weighs 216 pounds (98 kg).

He played for Hapoel Jerusalem, Pallacanestro Trieste, Pallalcesto Amatori Udine, Acqua San Bernardo Cantu, and Telekom Baskets Bonn. Kelečević was named to the 2002 Israeli Basketball Premier League Quintet.

With the Croatia men's national basketball team, Kelečević played in 47 games including in the 1995, 1997, and 1999 European Championships for Men, as well as in EuroBasket 1997.
