= Claudio Coldebella =

Italian basketball player (born 1968)

- Claudio Coldebella with Maccabi Tel Aviv, September 2026

Personal information
- Born: 25 June 1968 (age 58) Castelfranco Veneto, Italy
- Listed height: 198 cm (6 ft 6 in)
- Listed weight: 90 kg (198 lb)

Career information
- NBA draft: 1990: undrafted
- Playing career: 1986–2006
- Position: Point guard
- Coaching career: 2006–2008

Career history

Playing
- 1986–1988: Mestre
- 1988–1989: Aurora Desio
- 1989–1996: Virtus Bologna
- 1996–1998: AEK
- 1998–2002: PAOK
- 2002–2006: Olimpia Milano

Coaching
- 2006–2008: Olimpia Milano (assistant)

Career highlights
- As a player: FIBA Saporta Cup champion (1990); 3× Italian League champion (1993–1995); Italian Cup winner (1990); Italian SuperCup winner (1995); Greek Cup winner (1999); 2× Greek League All-Star (1998, 1999)
Medals
Men's basketball
Representing Italy
EuroBasket
Silver medal – second place	1997 Spain

Claudio Coldebella (born 25 June 1968 in Castelfranco Veneto) is an Italian former professional basketball player, coach and executive, currently general manager of Maccabi Tel Aviv B.C.

Playing as point guard, he had a successful club career in Italy, where he won three Italian LBA titles, and Greece, where he reached a EuroLeague Final, and won a Greek Cup.

He also played internationally for Italy, most notably earning a silver medal at the EuroBasket 1997.

== Professional career ==
Coldebella started his career with local side Basket Mestre of the second division Serie A2, staying two years. Moving to another A2 side, Aurora Desio, he posted 11.8 points and 2.3 steals in 1988–1989.

He caught the eye of top tier LBA side Virtus Bologna, who signed him in 1989. Coldebella stayed 7 years with Virtus, winning three consecutive Serie A titles between 1993 and 1995. The Italian moved to the Greek Basket League in 1996, joining AEK.

With the Athens side, he reached the 1998 EuroLeague Final, losing the European elite competition match up to former club Virtus. He changed teams in 1998, but stayed in Greece, joining PAOK. He helped the Thessaloniki team win the Greek Cup in 1999, also playing in the league All Star Game the same season. Coldebella stayed in Greece until 2002, and he is still highly regarded in the country.

He then returned to Italy, joining Olimpia Milano, he captained the side from 2003 to 2006, the year he ended his career.

== Coaching and executive career ==
- 2006-2008: Olimpia Milano (assistant coach)
- 2009-2010: Juvecaserta (general manager)
- 2010-2012: Benetton Treviso (general manager)
- 2012-2013: Universo Treviso Basket (general manager)
- 2013-2016: Lega Nazionale Pallacanestro (CEO)
- 2016-2018: Pallacanestro Varese (general manager)
- 2018-2022: UNICS Kazan (general manager)
- 2023–2025: Pallacanestro Reggiana (general manager)
- 2025–Present: Maccabi Tel Aviv B.C. (general manager)

== National team career ==
Coldebella made his debut with the senior Italian national team in 1989. After playing in the EuroBasket 1993 and EuroBasket 1995 without much collective success, he was nearly third time lucky in EuroBasket 1997, after reaching the final, but losing to Yugoslavia. He earned a silver medal after the game, which proved to be his last for Italy.

During that time, he also played for Italy in the 1993 Mediterranean Games (winning gold) and the 1994 Goodwill Games, where Italy beat the United States (composed of college players available to play, including Damon Stoudamire) in the semifinal, later earning silver.

== Honours and awards ==
=== Club ===
- Italian Cup Winner: (1990)
- FIBA Saporta Cup Champion: (1990)
- 3× Italian League Champion: (1993, 1994, 1995)
- Italian SuperCup Winner: (1995)
- 2× Greek League All-Star: (1998, 1999)
- Greek Cup Winner: (1999)

=== Italian national team ===
- Mediterranean Games: 1993 Languedoc-Roussillon Gold
- Goodwill Games: 1994 St. Petersburg Silver
- EuroBasket 1997 Spain Silver
