= Miroslav Radošević =

Serbian basketball coach (born 1973)

Personal information
- Born: 6 February 1973 (age 53) Titovo Užice, SR Serbia, SFR Yugoslavia
- Listed height: 1.94 m (6 ft 4 in)
- Listed weight: 95 kg (209 lb)

Career information
- NBA draft: 1995: undrafted
- Playing career: 1990–2007
- Position: Shooting guard
- Number: 13
- Coaching career: 2010–present

Career history

Playing
- 1990–1994: Užice
- 1994–1997: Borac Čačak
- 1997–2000: Partizan
- 2000–2002: Türk Telekom
- 2002–2003: Euro Roseto
- 2003–2004: Prokom Trefl Sopot
- 2004–2007: Banvit

Coaching
- 2010–2011: Sloboda
- 2016–2020: Banvit (assistant)

Career highlights
- 2× Yugoslav Cup winner (1999, 2000)
Medals
Men's basketball
Representing FR Yugoslavia
FIBA European Championship
Gold medal – first place	1997 Spain	National team

Miroslav "Mire" Radošević (Serbian Cyrillic: Мирослав Радошевић; born 6 February 1973) is a Serbian basketball coach and former player. Standing at 1.94 m (6 ft 4 1/2 in), he played the shooting guard position. Radošević won the gold medal at the 1997 FIBA European Championship with Yugoslav national team.

== Post-playing career ==
After finishing his playing career in 2007, Radošević became the sports director of his hometown club Sloboda. He worked there until 2015. Prior to the 2016–17 season, he was named assistant coach for Banvit of the Turkish Super League.
