= Mikhail Mikhailov (basketball) =

Russian basketball player and coach

Personal information
- Born: 17 May 1971 (age 55) Zlatoust, Russian SFSR, Soviet Union
- Listed height: 2.07 m (6 ft 9 in)
- Listed weight: 109 kg (240 lb)

Career information
- Playing career: 1991–2005
- Position: Power forward / center
- Coaching career: 2006–present

Career history

Playing
- 1991–1993: Spartak St. Petersburg
- 1993–1994: Svetlana St. Petersburg
- 1994–1996: Estudiantes
- 1996–1998: Real Madrid
- 1998–1999: Aris Thessaloniki
- 1999–2000: Real Madrid
- 2000–2002: Ural Great
- 2002–2003: Snaidero Udine
- 2003–2004: Caja San Fernando
- 2004–2005: Ural Great

Coaching
- 2006–2009: Spartak Primorye (assistant)
- 2010: Krasnye Krylia
- 2012: Russia Under-18 (assistant)
- 2013: Russia Under-20 (assistant)
- 2013: Avtodor Saratov
- 2014–2015: Russia Under-20
- 2021–2022: Zhejiang Golden Bulls (consultant)

Career highlights
- As a player: FIBA European Selection (1995); Spanish League champion (2000); Greek League All-Star (1998); Russian CIS League champion (1992); 2× Russian Championship champion (2001, 2002); Russian League All-Star (1999); Honored Master of Sports of Russia (1994); North European League champion (2001)
Medals
Men's basketball
Representing Russia
FIBA World Cup
| Silver medal – second place | 1994 Canada | National Team |
| Silver medal – second place | 1998 Greece | National Team |
FIBA EuroBasket
| Silver medal – second place | 1993 Germany | National Team |
| Bronze medal – third place | 1997 Spain | National Team |

Mikhail Aleksandrovich Mikhailov (alternate spelling: Mikhaylov) (Russian: Михаил Александрович Михайлов; born 17 May 1971 in Zlatoust, USSR) is a former Russian-Spanish professional basketball player and coach. In 1994, he was an Honored Master of Sports of Russia.

== Professional career ==
Mikhailov was a member of the FIBA European Selection team, in 1995. In the Summer of 1996, Mikhailov turned down a contract offer from the NBA's Sacramento Kings.

== National team career ==
Mikhailov was a part of the senior Russian national teams that won the silver medal at the 1994 FIBA World Championship, and the 1998 FIBA World Championship. He also won a silver medal at the 1993 EuroBasket, and a bronze medal at the 1997 EuroBasket, where he also earned an All-EuroBasket Team selection. He also played with Russia at the 1995 EuroBasket.

== Personal life ==
After his career, he stayed in Spain where he raised his family including his son of the same name Mikhail Mikhailov. His son played high school basketball in Kansas and went on to Canada to play on the university team of the Winnipeg Wesmen.
