= Dmitry Shakulin =

Russian basketball coach and player

Personal information
- Born: May 11, 1968 (age 58) Kirov, Soviet Union
- Listed height: 1.95 m (6 ft 5 in)

Career information
- NBA draft: 1990: undrafted
- Playing career: 1985–2002
- Position: Small forward

Career history

Playing
- 1985–1992: Dynamo Moscow
- 1992–1993: Beitar Tel Aviv
- 1993–1994: Dynamo Moscow
- 1994–1995: SV Oberelchingen
- 1995–1996: Dynamo Moscow
- 1997–1998: CSKA Moscow
- 1998–1999: SV Oberelchingen
- 1999–2000: Maccabi Rishon LeZion
- 2000–2002: Spartak St. Petersburg

Coaching
- 2003–2005: Dynamo Moscow (assistant)
- 2004–2005: Russia U20 (assistant)
- 2005–2007: Dynamo Moscow Region (assistant)
- 2007: Dynamo Moscow Region
- 2007–2008: Khimki (assistant)
- 2007–2008: Russia U20 (assistant)
- 2008–2010: CSKA Moscow (assistant)
- 2009–2012: Russia (assistant)
- 2010–2011: CSKA Moscow
- 2011–2014: CSKA Moscow (assistant)
- 2015–2016: Ural Yekaterinburg
- 2016–2017: Trabzonspor B.K. (assistant)
Medals
Men's basketball
Representing Russia
FIBA EuroBasket
Silver medal – second place	1993 Germany
Bronze medal – third place	1997 Spain

Dmitry Shakulin (born May 11, 1968) is a Russian basketball coach and former player. He most recently was an assistant coach for the CSKA Moscow of the VTB United League.

With the Russian national team he played at the EuroBasket 1993 where he won the silver medal and at the EuroBasket 1997 where he won the bronze medal. At the club competition level, he won Russian League title two times with CSKA Moscow, in 1997 and 1998. He also played in Israel for Maccabi Rishon LeZion and for German first division side SV Oberelchingen.

After completing his playing career Schakulin worked as a trainer, primarily as an assistant coach to many teams. Among his greatest successes as assistant coach so far includes the U20 European Championship in 2005 as well as numerous Russian League titles with CSKA Moscow.

== Playing career ==
Shakulin started his professional career in Dynamo Moscow, after moving to Moscow from his hometown Kirov at age of 14. Here he stayed until the end of the Soviet Union and then he moved abroad for the first time in the 1992-93 season for the Israeli club Beitar Tel Aviv. He was part of the Russian national team at the EuroBasket 1993 where he won the silver medal, losing in the final game with just one point difference against host nation Germany. After another year at Dynamo in the 1993-94 season Schakulin returned to Germany and played in the 1994-95 season for the newcomer in the league SV Tally Oberelchingen. They surprisingly made it into the play-offs of the championship, where Bayer Giants Leverkusen defeated in the first round.

In the following 1995-96 season with Dynamo Moscow, Schakulin was the runner-up behind series champion CSKA Moscow. In February 1997 he finally moved himself to CSKA after Dynamo Moscow its professional play operation stopped due to financial reasons, and there he won two championships in 1997 and 1998. Moreover, again, he managed to jump in the final round of the national team for European Championship finals. At the EuroBasket 1997, Russia defeated hosts Spain the quarterfinals, however, Italy defeated them in the semi-final game. Later, Russia took the bronze medal in the "small final" against Greece. For the Basketball Bundesliga 1998-99 season, Schakulin returned again back to Oberelchingen, where they managed to get in the play-offs again. After a rather surprising series success in the qualifying round over newly DJK Würzburg, they lost in the quarter-final series against the Rhöndorfer TV. Schakulin then moved to Israeli Maccabi Rishon LeZion and later finished his career with the Russian side Spartak St. Petersburg in 2000-01 season.

== Coaching career ==
=== Dynamo Moscow ===
Year after retiring from the professional basketball, in 2003 Schakulin was part of Dynamo Moscow coaching staff, club where he spent most of his career. Following the resignation of Valdemaras Chomičius in November 2003, Schakulin served as an interim head coach, before the new coach Zvi Sherf began his service. In the following season with Dynamo new head coach Valeri Tikhonenko, he was primarily responsible for the youth level and also assisted Yevgeny Paschutin in the Russia Under-20 team when they won the U20 European Championship in 2005, first for the country after the end of the Soviet Union.

=== Dynamo Moscow Region ===
Then he worked in Dynamo Moscow Region. Here he served again as an interim head coach in 2007, following head coach Paulauskas resignation in February 2007. Later in the season Dynamo lost in the quarterfinals of the 2006–07 FIBA EuroCup to the Spanish team CB Estudiantes. For the following season the suburb of Moscow Dynamo changed its name to Triumph Lyubertsy, but Schakulin moved to Khimki after team added Kestutis Kemzūra. He served as an assistant coach of the Russian Under-20 team back in 2007 and 2008, where they appeared in the final stages of the tournament, but couldn't repeat the success from 2005.

=== CSKA Moscow ===
After Yevgeny Paschutin in 2008 gave up his longtime assistant job in the Russian team CSKA Moscow, Schakulin followed him and became an assistant coach to Ettore Messina. Since 2009, he has been also serving as an assistant coach of the Russian national basketball team. In November 2010, he stepped in as interim head coach until the end of season, after club parted ways with Duško Vujošević due to poor results. Later he signed new two-year contract with an option for third yeat with CSKA, this time as an assistant coach. In July 2014, he parted ways with the team. Over his six-years period in the club, he won 6 Russian Leagues titles, 4 VTB United League titles and also collected 5 Euroleague Final Four participation. During that time, he's been working as an assistant coach with several head coaches including: Ettore Messina, Evgeny Pashutin, Duško Vujošević and Jonas Kazlauskas. In addition, since he was appointed as Russian team assistant coach, Russia took the bronze medal at the FIBA EuroBasket 2011 and at the 2012 Summer Olympics.
