= Evgeni Kisurin =

Russian basketball player

Personal information
- Born: January 28, 1969 (age 57) Novosibirsk, Russian SFSR, Soviet Union
- Listed height: 2.07 m (6 ft 9 in)
- Listed weight: 107 kg (236 lb)

Career information
- College: VCU (1992–1993)
- NBA draft: 1993: undrafted
- Playing career: 1985–2006
- Position: Power forward / center
- Coaching career: 2007–present

Career history
- 1985–1986: Lokomotiv Novosibirsk
- 1987–1992: Spartak Saint Petersburg
- 1993–1994: A.P.U. Udine
- 1994–1996: CSKA Moscow
- 1996–1998: Cibona Zagreb
- 1998–1999: CSKA Moscow
- 1999–2000: Pallacanestro Varese
- 2000: Anwil Włocławek
- 2000: Saint Petersburg Lions
- 2000–2003: Spartak Saint Petersburg
- 2003–2004: Arsenal Tula
- 2004–2005: Spartak Saint Petersburg
- 2005–2006: Olympique Antibes

Career highlights
- 2× FIBA European Selection (1995, 1996); FIBA EuroStar (1996); CIS Premier League champion (1992); 3× Russian Championship champion (1995, 1996, 1999); USSR Cup winner (1987); 2× Croatian League champion (1997, 1998)
Medals
Men's basketball
Representing Russia
FIBA World Cup
Silver medal – second place	1994 Canada
Silver medal – second place	1998 Greece
FIBA EuroBasket
Bronze medal – third place	1997 Spain

Evgeni Kisurin (alternate spellings: Evgeny, Evgenij) (born January 28, 1969) is a Russian former professional basketball player, and coach. At a height of 2.07 m tall, he played at the power forward and center positions.

== College career ==
Kisurin played college basketball at VCU.

== Professional career ==
Kisurin spent an important part of his career playing for CSKA Moscow. He helped his team reach the EuroLeague Final Four in 1996.

== National team career ==
Kisurin was a regular member of the senior Russian national basketball team. With Russia, he won silver medals at the 1994 FIBA World Championship, and 1998 FIBA World Championship. He also won a bronze medal at the 1997 EuroBasket.

He also played at the 1999 EuroBasket, and at the 2000 Summer Olympic Games.

== Coaching career ==
On April 8, 2013, he was appointed the acting head coach of the Russian club Spartak Saint-Petersburg.
