= Davide Bonora =

Italian basketball player (born 1973)

BC Roma
- Title: Assistant coach
- League: LBA; EuroCup

Personal information
- Born: February 5, 1973 (age 53) Bologna, Italy
- Listed height: 1.86 m (6 ft 1 in)
- Listed weight: 84 kg (185 lb)

Career information
- NBA draft: 1995: undrafted
- Playing career: 1989–2011
- Position: Point guard
- Number: 6
- Coaching career: 2014–present

Career history

Playing
- 1989–1990: Virtus Bologna
- 1991–1995: Scaligera Verona
- 1995–1999: Pallacanestro Treviso
- 1999–2002: Virtus Bologna
- 2002–2005: Virtus Roma
- 2005–2006: Scandone Avellino
- 2006–2008: NSB Rieti
- 2008–2009: Reyer Venezia
- 2010: Olimpia Matera
- 2010–2011: RB Montecatini

Coaching
- 2014–2017: Eurobasket Roma
- 2023–2024: Supernova Fiumicino
- 2024–2025: Scafati Basket (assistant)
- 2026: Galatasaray (assistant)
- 2026–present: BC Roma (assistant)

Career highlights
- EuroLeague champion (2001); 2× Italian League champion (1997, 2001); 2× Italian Cup winner (2001, 2002); Italian Supercup winner (1997); Saporta Cup winner (1999); Italian Cup MVP (1994)
Medals
Representing Italy
Men's Basketball
FIBA EuroBasket
Silver medal – second place	1997 Spain	Italy
Gold medal – first place	1999 France	Italy

Davide Bonora (born February 5, 1973) is an Italian professional basketball coach and former player, who played at the point guard position. He is currently the assistant coach for BC Roma of the Italian Lega Basket Serie A (LBA) and the EuroCup.

== Professional career ==
Bonora played his whole career in Italy with the following clubs: Virtus Bologna, Scaligera Verona, Pallacanestro Treviso, Virtus Roma, Scandone Avellino, NSB Rieti, Reyer Venezia, Olimpia Matera and RB Montecatini.

While playing with Virtus Bologna, he won the 2001 Italian League championship, the 2001 and 2002 Italian Cups, and the 2001 EuroLeague. While playing with Pallacanestro Treviso, he won the 1997 Italian League championship, the 1997 Italian Supercup and the 1999 Saporta Cup.

== Coaching career ==
On December 11, 2024, he signed as an assistant coach with Scafati Basket of the Lega Basket Serie A (LBA).

On 5 January 2026, he signed as an assistant coach with Galatasaray of the Basketbol Süper Ligi (TBSL).

== National team career ==
Bonora played with the senior Italian national basketball team from 1995 till 1999. He won the gold medal at the Eurobasket 1999 and the silver medal at the EuroBasket 1997. He also played at the 1998 FIBA World Championship.
