= Christos Myriounis =

Greek basketball player (born 1971)

- Χρήστος Μυριούνης
- Born: 15 June 1971 (age 54); Athens, Greece
- Occupation: Professional basketball player
- Years active: 1991-
- Known for: Basketball career with Panathinaikos B.C., Greek national basketball team
- Notable work: Greek Cup title (1993), EuroLeague championship (1996)
- Height: 2.05 m (6 ft 9 in) (6'8 3/4")

Christos Myriounis (Greek: Χρήστος Μυριούνης) (born 15 June 1971 in Athens) is a retired Greek professional basketball player. At a height of 2.05 m (6'8 3/4"), he played as a small forward-power forward.

== Professional career ==
Myriounis started his playing career with Kronos BCE. In 1991, he was selected along with Fragiskos Alvertis and Nikos Oikonomou, to join the Greek Basket League club Panathinaikos. In 1993, Myriounis was a starter with Panathinaikos (his teammates were great players such as Nikos Galis, Arijan Komazec, Stojko Vranković, and Tiit Sokk), and with them, he won the Greek Cup title. In 1994 and 1995, with Panathinaikos, he finished in 3rd place in the EuroLeague Final Four. He also won the EuroLeague championship of 1996, while with Panathinaikos.

During the next season after that, he played for Apollon Patras, and he was a Greek Cup finalist with them. He also played for Peristeri, Irakleio, and Aris.

== National team career ==
Myriounis also played with the senior Greek national basketball team at the EuroBasket 1997.
