= Nikola Lončar =

Serbian basketball player

Nikola Lončar Никола Лончар
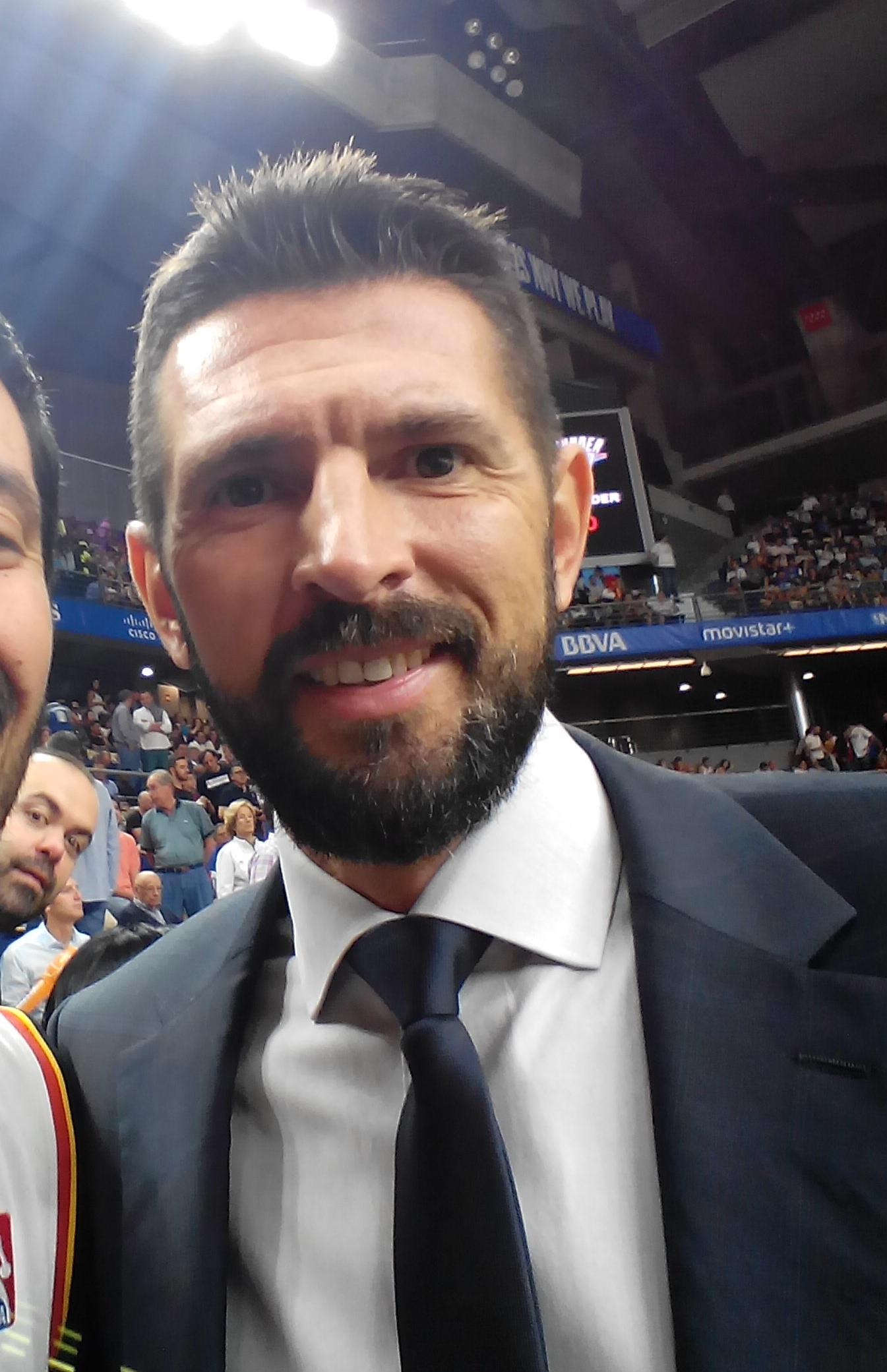
- Lončar in October 2016.

Personal information
- Born: May 31, 1972 (age 54) Kragujevac, SR Serbia, Yugoslavia
- Listed height: 1.97 m (6 ft 5 1/2 in)
- Listed weight: 98 kg (216 lb)

Career information
- NBA draft: 1994: undrafted
- Playing career: 1989–2006
- Position: Shooting guard
- Number: 6, 7, 10

Career history
- 1989–1995: Partizan
- 1995–1996: Real Madrid
- 1996–1997: Cagiva Varese
- 1997–1998: PSG Racing
- 1998: Maccabi Tel Aviv
- 1998–1999: Joventut Badalona
- 2000: Zucchetti Montecatini
- 2001–2002: Breogán
- 2002–2005: Estudiantes
- 2005–2006: Partizan
- 2006: Armani Jeans Milano

Career highlights
- EuroLeague champion (1992); 2× YUBA League champion (1992, 1995); 3× Yugoslav Cup winner (1992, 1994, 1995)
Medals
Representing (Federal Republic of Yugoslavia) FR Yugoslavia
Men's basketball
Olympic Games
Silver medal – second place	1996 Atlanta	National team
FIBA World Championship
Gold medal – first place	1998 Greece	National team
FIBA European Championship
Gold medal – first place	1997 Spain	National team
Bronze medal – third place	1999 France	National team
Representing Yugoslavia
Europe Championship for Cadets
Silver medal – second place	1989 Spain	U16 Team

Nikola Lončar (Serbian Cyrillic: Никола Лончар; born May 31, 1972) is a Serbian former professional basketball player. He also holds Spanish citizenship.

== Professional career ==
Lončar started his career at Radnički Kragujevac and later joined Partizan, making his professional debut in 1989. With Partizan, he won the Euroleague in 1992. Lončar also played for Real Madrid, Cagiva Varese, PSG Racing, Maccabi Tel Aviv, Joventut Badalona, Zucchetti Montecatini, Breogán, Estudiantes and Armani Jeans Milano.

== National team career ==
Lončar was a member of the Yugoslav national team at four major tournaments during the 1990s. He took silver medal at the 1996 Summer Olympics in Atlanta, United States, gold medal at the 1998 FIBA World Championship in Greece, and two FIBA European Championship medals (gold in 1997 and bronze in 1999).

== Post-playing career ==
After ending his basketball playing career in 2006, Lončar began working on Spanish television as a studio analyst for the NBA coverage on Movistar+ platform.

In October 2015, Lončar became the president of Kragujevački Radnički.

In March 2018, Lončar was named a sports director of Partizan NIS. In February 2021, Partizan parted ways with Lončar. Afterwards, he joined staff of Kragujevac-based club Radnički 1950.
