= Roberts Štelmahers =

Latvian basketball player and coach

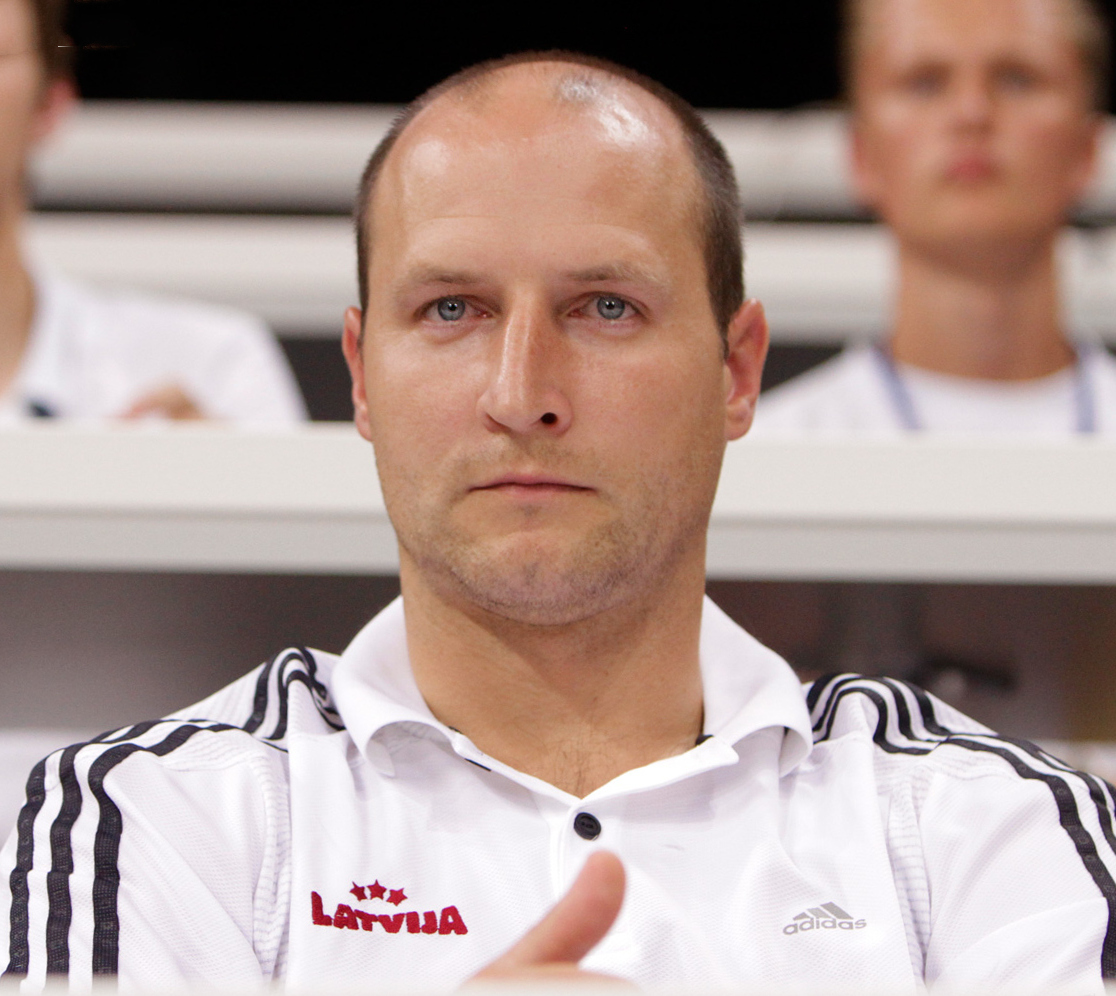
- Štelmahers as assistant coach of Latvia in 2011

Personal information
- Born: November 19, 1974 (age 51) Riga, Latvian SSR, Soviet Union
- Listed height: 6 ft 3 in (1.91 m)
- Listed weight: 194 lb (88 kg)

Career information
- Playing career: 1990–2009
- Position: Point guard
- Number: 7
- Coaching career: 2009–present

Career history

Playing
- 1990–1991: Rīgas ASK
- 1991–1995: Bonus Riga
- 1995–1998: ASK/Brocēni/LMT
- 1998: Avtodor Saratov
- 1998–1999: Zielona Góra
- 1999–2000: Śląsk Wrocław
- 2000–2001: Pınar Karşıyaka
- 2001–2002: Ülkerspor
- 2002–2004: KK Union Olimpija
- 2004–2008: Lietuvos Rytas
- 2009: ASK Riga
- 2009: Societa Veroli Basket

Coaching
- 2009: BC Perlas
- 2010–2011: BC Lietuvos Rytas (assistant)
- 2011: BC Perlas
- 2010–2012: Latvia (assistant)
- 2011–2012: BC Pieno žvaigždės
- 2012–2015: BK Ventspils
- 2016: Valmiera/ORDO
- 2016–2017: Czarni Słupsk
- 2017–2019: BK Ventspils
- 2019–2022: Kalev/Cramo
- 2022: ZZ Leiden
- 2022: ERA Nymburk
- 2023: Lietkabelis
- 2024–2026: Czarni Słupsk

Career highlights
- As player: EuroCup champion (2005); 2× Baltic Basketball League champion (2006, 2007); 3× LBL champion (1996–1998); PLK champion (2000); Slovenian champion (2004); Lithuanian champion (2006); Slovenian Cup winner (2003); Polish Supercup winner (2000); Turkish President's Cup winner (2001); 2× Slovenian Supercup winner (2003, 2004); As head coach: Baltic Basketball League champion (2013); 3x Latvian League champion (2014, 2016, 2018); 2x Latvian-Estonian League champion (2019, 2021); Estonian League champion (2021); Estonian Cup winner (2021)

Roberts Štelmahers (born November 19, 1974) is a Latvian professional basketball coach and former player who played the point guard position. He was most recently the head coach for Czarni Słupsk of the Polish Basketball League (PLK). Štelmahers was a member of the Latvia national basketball team from 1992 to 2005 participating in four EuroBasket final tournaments in 1997, 2001, 2003 and 2005. He has played a total of 144 games for his national team.

== Playing career ==
Štelmahers grew up with the ASK Riga youth team; he made his debut with Rīgas ASK during the 1990–91 season. After that he signed for Bonus Riga and played there till the 1994–95 championship. Then he signed with ASK/Broceni/Riga for 1995–96 season and played there until the 1997–98 championship. Štelmahers moved to Russia for the 1998–99 season, signed by Avtodor Saratov. He was released in late December due to the club's financial problems and in January moved to Poland, signed by Zielona Góra. He stayed in Poland and signed with Śląsk Wrocław for the 1999–00 season. For the 2000–01 season, Štelmahers moved to Turkey and signed with Pınar Karşıyaka. He stayed in Turkey and played for Ülkerspor in the 2001–02 season. After that Štelmahers moved to Slovenia and played two seasons in KK Union Olimpija. In 2004 he moved back to Baltics and signed with Lithuanian powerhouse Lietuvos Rytas where he stayed until the 2007–08 championship. After a break due to an injury, he signed with his first team, Rīgas ASK in January 2009. He retired in 2009.

== Coaching career ==
On 4 July 2022, Štelmahers signed as head coach of ZZ Leiden of the BNXT League. The same month, on 30 July, Nymburk announced Stelmahers as their new coach, a move criticised by Leiden's management.

On 30 July 2022, he signed with ERA Nymburk of the National Basketball League.

On 29 June 2023, Štelmahers signed a two-year (1+1) deal with Lietkabelis Panevėžys of the Lithuanian Basketball League (LKL) and the EuroCup. On 27 October, he was fired after a difficult start to the 2023–24 season.

On December 4, 2024, he signed with Czarni Słupsk of the Polish Basketball League (PLK).

== Euroleague career statistics ==
Legend
GP	Games played	GS	Games started	MPG	Minutes per game
FG%	Field-goal percentage	3P%	3-point field-goal percentage	FT%	Free-throw percentage
RPG	Rebounds per game	APG	Assists per game	SPG	Steals per game
BPG	Blocks per game	PPG	Points per game	PIR	Performance index rating
**Bold**	Career high

Year	Team	GP	GS	MPG	FG%	3P%	FT%	RPG	APG	SPG	BPG	PPG	PIR
2001–02	Ülkerspor	19	13	20.0	.409	.341	.791	1.6	1.5	.9	.0	6.5	7.3
2002–03	Union Olimpija	**20**	7	24.2	.381	.219	.825	2.0	2.3	1.0	.0	8.6	8.6
2003–04	Union Olimpija	16	15	**30.5**	.402	.352	**.844**	2.4	3.1	**1.1**	.0	**11.6**	**12.6**
2005–06	Lietuvos Rytas	16	**16**	28.1	**.417**	**.418**	.771	**2.6**	**3.4**	.9	.0	10.1	10.1
Career		71	51	25.4	.401	.332	.817	2.1	2.5	1.0	.0	9.1	9.5

== Achievements ==
- 1995–96 Latvian National Championship (ASK/Brocēni)
- 1996–97 Latvian National Championship (ASK/Brocēni/LMT)
- 1997–98 Latvian National Championship (ASK/Brocēni/LMT)
- 1999-00 Polish National Championship (Śląsk Wrocław)
- 1999-00 Polish Supercup (Śląsk Wrocław)
- 2000–01 Turkish President's Cup Cup (Ülkerspor)
- 2002–03 Slovenian National Cup (KK Union Olimpija)
- 2002–03 Slovenian SuperCup (KK Union Olimpija)
- 2003–04 Slovenian National Championship (KK Union Olimpija)
- 2003–04 Slovenian SuperCup (KK Union Olimpija)
- 2004–05 ULEB Cup Championship (Lietuvos Rytas Vilnius)
- 2005–06 Baltic League Championship (Lietuvos Rytas Vilnius)
- 2005–06 Lithuanian National Championship (Lietuvos Rytas Vilnius)
- 2006–07 Baltic League Championship (Lietuvos Rytas Vilnius)
