= Denis Wucherer =

German basketball player and coach

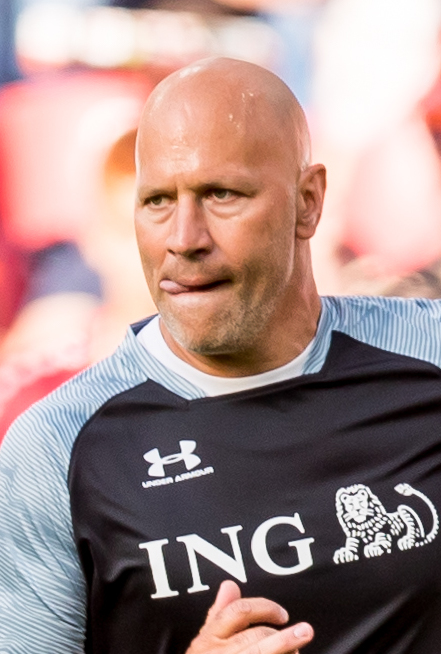
- Wucherer in 2019

Coretec Oostende
- Title: Head coach
- League: BNXT League

Personal information
- Born: 7 May 1973 (age 53) Mainz, West Germany
- Listed height: 6 ft 5 in (1.96 m)

Career information
- NBA draft: 1995: undrafted
- Playing career: 1991–2007
- Position: Shooting guard
- Coaching career: 2009–present

Career history

Playing
- 1991–1992: TV Langen
- 1992–1998: Bayer Giants Leverkusen
- 1998–2000: Sony Milano
- 2000–2001: Varese Roosters
- 2001: DJK Würzburg
- 2001–2002: Frankfurt Skyliners
- 2002–2005: Bayer Giants Leverkusen
- 2005: Benetton Treviso
- 2005–2007: Telenet Oostende

Coaching
- 2009–2010: Germany (assistant)
- 2011–2012: Bayern Munich (assistant)
- 2013–2017: Gießen 46ers
- 2017–2018: RheinStars Köln
- 2018–2021: Baskets Würzburg
- 2023–2025: Skyliners Frankfurt
- 2026–present: Oostende

Career highlights
- As a player: 4× German League champion (1993–1996); 2× Belgian League champion (2006–2007); 2× German Cup champion (1993, 1995); Italian Cup champion (2005); BBL All-Star Game MVP (2005); As a coach: German 2nd League champion (2015); German 2nd League Coach of the Year (2015)
Medals
Representing Germany
European Championships
Silver medal – second place	2005 Serbia & Montenegro	National team

Denis Wucherer (born 7 May 1973 in Mainz) is a German professional basketball coach and former player. He is 1.96 m (6 ft 5 in) tall and played shooting guard. He is the current head coach for Coretec Oostende of the BNXT League.

== Professional career ==
=== As player ===
Wucherer has played professional basketball in Germany (TV Langen, Bayer Giants Leverkusen, DJK Würzburg and Frankfurt Skyliners), Italy (Sony Milano, Varese Roosters, Benetton Treviso) and Belgium (Telindus BC Oostende). Most notable was his time for the Bayer Giants Leverkusen where he won 6 national titles and was known for triple doubles which he accomplished on several occasions.

=== As coach ===
Wucherer coached the Basketball Bundesliga team Gießen 46ers several years before he became head coach for the ProA team RheinStars Köln in 2017. He later joined s.Oliver Würzburg as head coach.

On March 4, 2026, he signed with Oostende of the BNXT League.

== German national team ==
Wucherer has played for the German national basketball team 123 times. His biggest success there was the silver medal at the EuroBasket 2005.

== Honors ==
As player:

- 4× German League champion: 1992–93, 1993–94, 1994–95, 1995–1996
- 2× Belgian League champion: 2005–06, 2006–07
- 2× German Cup champion: 1993, 1995
- Italian Cup champion: 2005

As head coach:

- National Championships:
  - German 2nd League champion: 2014–15
