= Darius Lukminas =

Lithuanian basketball player (born 1968)

Personal information
- Born: 9 February 1968 (age 58) Kaunas, Lithuanian SSR, Soviet Union
Medal record
Men's basketball
Representing Lithuania
Olympic Games
Bronze medal – third place	1996 Atlanta	Lithuania
European Championships
Silver medal – second place	1995 Greece	LTU

Darius Lukminas (born 9 February 1968) is a Lithuanian former basketball player for the Lithuanian National Basketball team and Žalgiris Kaunas. He was a shooting guard; his weight was listed as 90 kilograms and his height as 195 centimeters.

== Professional career ==
- 1990-1996 - Žalgiris Kaunas
- 1996-1998 - Avtodor Saratov
- 1998-2001 - Atomerőmű SE
- 2001-2002: Topo-Centras Atletas Kaunas
- 2003-2006 - BC Gala Baku
- 2006 - ASK Riga
- 2006-2007 - Atletas Kaunas
- 2007 - Sakalai Vilnius
- 2009-2010 - KK Raseiniai

== Awards and achievements ==
- European championship Silver medalist - Eurobasket 1995
- Olympic Bronze medalist - Basketball at the 1996 Summer Olympics
