= Oded Kattash =

Israeli basketball player and coach

Oded Kattash עודד קטש
- Kattash in 2026

Maccabi Tel Aviv
- Title: Head coach
- League: Israeli Basketball Premier League; EuroLeague

Personal information
- Born: October 10, 1974 (age 52) Giv'atayim, Israel
- Listed height: 1.94 m (6 ft 4 in)
- Listed weight: 84 kg (185 lb)

Career information
- NBA draft: 1996: undrafted
- Playing career: 1991–2001
- Position: Point guard
- Coaching career: 2004–present

Career history

Playing
- 1991–1992: Maccabi Darom
- 1992–1993: Maccabi Ramat Gan
- 1994–1995: Hapoel Galil Elyon
- 1995–1999: Maccabi Tel Aviv
- 1999–2001: Panathinaikos

Coaching
- 2004–2007: Hapoel Galil Elyon
- 2007–2008: Maccabi Tel Aviv
- 2008–2010: Hapoel Gilboa Galil
- 2010–2013: Israel (assistant)
- 2010–2011: Hapoel Jerusalem
- 2012–2014: Hapoel Eilat
- 2014–2015: Hapoel Tel Aviv
- 2015–2017: Hapoel Eilat
- 2017: Israel U-20
- 2017–2021: Israel
- 2018–2021: Hapoel Jerusalem
- 2021: Panathinaikos
- 2022–present: Maccabi Tel Aviv

Career highlights
- As a player: FIBA EuroBasket Top Scorer (1997); EuroLeague champion (2000); 2× FIBA EuroStar (1997, 1999); FIBA European Selection Team (1998); 2× Greek League champion (2000, 2001); Greek League All-Star (1999); 4× Israeli Premier League champion (1996–1999); Israeli Premier League MVP (1998); 2× Israeli State Cup winner (1998, 1999); As a head coach: 3x Israeli Premier League champion (2010, 2023, 2024); 2× Israeli State Cup winner (2019, 2020); Greek Cup winner (2021); Greek League champion (2021); Israeli League Cup winner (2019); Israeli Premier League Coach of the Year (2007)
Medals
Men's basketball
Head Coach for Israel
FIBA Europe Under-20
Silver medal – second place	2017 Greece	Under-20

Oded Kattash (Hebrew: עודד קטש; born October 10, 1974) is an Israeli professional basketball coach, and former player. He is currently head coach for Maccabi Tel Aviv of the Israeli Basketball Premier League and the EuroLeague. During his playing career, at a height of 194 cm (6 ft 4 1/2 in), Kattash played at the point guard position. As a player, he won the 1998 Israeli League MVP, and the EuroLeague title in the 1999–2000 season, while playing for Panathinaikos.

== Early career ==
When Kattash was 9 years old, he joined the junior youth department of Maccabi Tel Aviv. He then played with Maccabi Darom, which was Maccabi Tel Aviv's farm team at the time.

== Professional career ==
Kattash played with Maccabi Ramat Gan, and Hapoel Galil Elyon, before returning in 1995, to Maccabi Tel Aviv, to join their senior men's team. With Macabbi's senior team, he won 4 Israeli League championships and 2 Israeli State Cups. He was the 1998 Israeli Basketball Premier League MVP. After leading the 1997 EuroBasket in scoring, he subsequently agreed to play with the New York Knicks, but he never actually played in the NBA, because of the 1998–99 NBA season lockout, that started on July 1, 1998.

Eventually, he signed a three-year contract with Panathinaikos. In the 2000 EuroLeague Finals game, he scored 17 points, against his former team Maccabi Tel Aviv, to win the EuroLeague championship with Panathinaikos. His career ended prematurely a few months later, when he suffered a serious knee injury.

== National team career ==
Kattash played at the 1997 edition of the EuroBasket, with the senior Israeli national team, scoring 22 points per game during the tournament.

== Coaching career ==
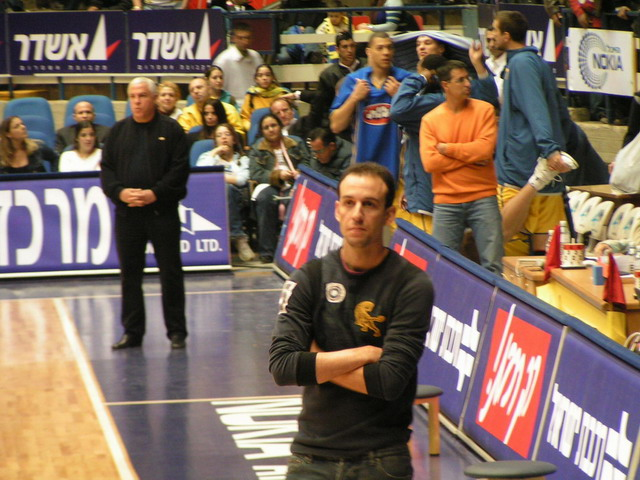
Oded Kattash coaching (2003)

After Kattash retired from playing basketball, he took up basketball coaching, and he first coached Hapoel Galil Elyon. He was the head coach of Macabbi Tel Aviv, from summer of 2007, until January 1, 2008, when he resigned.

Shortly after, he returned to Galil Elyon, and helped the team stay in the Israeli first division. In 2009, he remained with Galil, leading them against the odds, to the Israeli League Final Four, and coming within a last shot of knocking out Maccabi Tel Aviv in the semifinals. In 2010, he won the Israeli League championship with Galil, after a win over Maccabi Tel Aviv in the league finals.

In June 2010, Kattash was appointed as Hapoel Jerusalem's head coach, signing a three-year contract.

On June 21, 2012, Kattash was appointed the head coach of Hapoel Eilat, as the team was re-included into the Israeli Premier League, for the 2012-13 season.

On June 27, 2014, at the end of his contract, Kattash signed a three-year contract with Hapoel Tel Aviv. On November 3, 2015, he was dismissed, after only four games, after three consecutive losses. He subsequently returned to Hapoel Eilat. However, On July 18, 2017, Hapoel Eilat and Kattash decided to part ways. During that summer, Kattash led the Israel men's under-20 national team to a silver medal at the 2017 FIBA Europe Under-20 Championship.

On October 10, 2017, The Basketball Federation of Israel, named Kattash the new head coach of the senior Israeli national team, for the next four years.

On February 22, 2018, Kattash returned for a second stint to Hapoel Jerusalem, signing a one-and-a-half-year deal.

Kattash with Maccabi Tel Aviv in 2026

On January 14, 2021, Kattash signed a one-and-a-half-year deal with Panathinaikos of the Greek Basket League and the EuroLeague.

== Coaching record ==
Legend
G	Games coached	W	Games won	L	Games lost	W–L %	Win-loss %

Note: The EuroLeague is not the only competition in which the team played during the season. He also coached in domestic competition, and regional competition if applicable.

=== EuroLeague ===
Team	Year	G	W	L	W–L%	Result
Maccabi Tel Aviv	2007–08	9	6	3	.667	Resigned
Panathinaikos	2020–21	16	5	11	.313	Eliminated in the regular season
Career		25	11	14	.440	

== Personal life ==
Kattash is of Algerian descent. He is known to have different-coloured irises, a condition known as heterochromia of the irises (heterochromia iridis). Kattash is a good friend with the former player and current coach Dror Cohen. They have a long history of playing and coaching together.

== See also ==
- List of select Jewish basketball players
