= Sascha Hupmann =

German basketball player (1970–2020)

Personal information
- Born: April 21, 1970 Munich, West Germany
- Died: April 12, 2020 (aged 49)

Career information
- College: Evansville Purple Aces
- Stats at Basketball Reference

Sascha Dirk Hupmann (21 April 1970 – 12 April 2020) was a German professional basketball player from Munich. He played college basketball in the United States for the University of Evansville from 1989 to 1993. He played professional basketball in Europe and he also played for the German national team.

His professional playing career started at TVG Trier and played one year there from 1993 to 1994. In 1994 he move to the Bayer Giants Leverkusen and played there for two seasons. His next move was to Alba Berlin until 1997. He would help both teams win several Basketball Bundesliga titles, two at Bayer and one at Alba. The next five years of his professional career in Europe took him to Greece. He played for Panathinaikos and then Iraklis Thessaloniki. He spent his last professional season at TSG Ehingen in Germany.
