= Tomás Jofresa =

Spanish basketball player

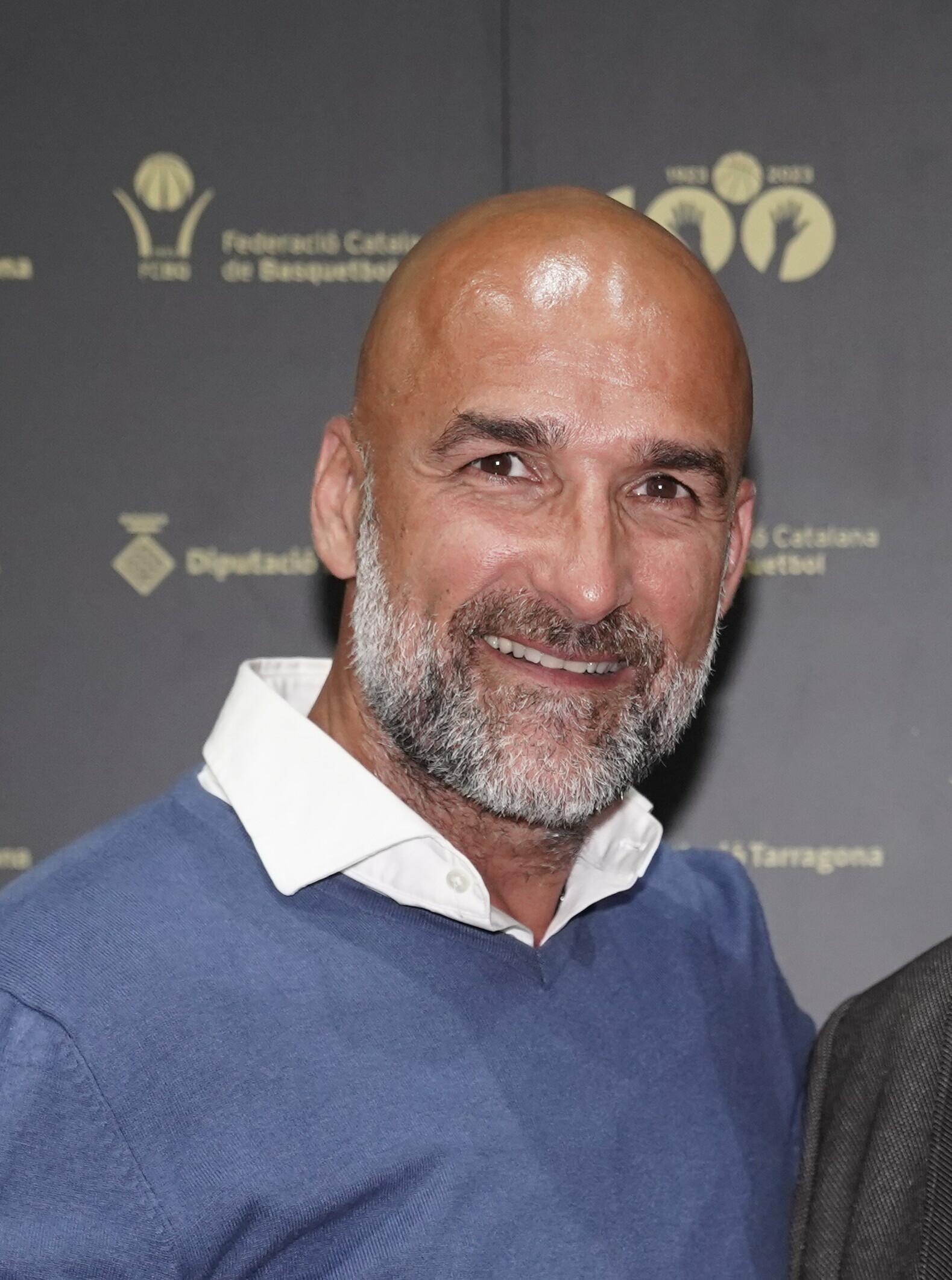

Personal information
- Born: 25 January 1970 (age 56) Barcelona, Spain
- Listed height: 6 ft 0 in (1.83 m)
- Listed weight: 176 lb (80 kg)

Career information
- NBA draft: 1992: undrafted
- Playing career: 1987–2003
- Position: Point guard

Career history
- 1987-1996: Joventut Badalona
- 1996-1998: Unicaja Málaga
- 1998: Covirán Granada
- 1998–1999: Benetton Treviso
- 1999–2001: Gijón Baloncesto
- 2001–2002: Casademont Girona
- 2002–2003: Panellinios
- 2003: Benfica

Career highlights
- EuroLeague champion (1994); Saporta Cup champion (1999)

Tomás Jofresa Prats (born 25 January 1970) is a Spanish basketball player. He competed in the men's tournament at the 1992 Summer Olympics with Spain. During his 16-year long career, he played mainly in Spain, with stints in Italy, Greece and Portugal.

His brother, Rafa, was also a professional basketball player. Both brothers played together at the 1992 Olympics and were teammates at Joventut Badalona.
