= List of Serbia men's national basketball team players =

This is a list of men's national basketball team players who represented Serbia at the EuroBasket, the FIBA Basketball World Cup, and the Summer Olympics.

Since 2006, the Serbia squad has participated at eight EuroBasket tournaments (2007, 2009, 2011, 2013, 2015, 2017, 2022, 2025), four Basketball World Cups (2010, 2014, 2019, 2023) and two Summer Olympics (2016, 2024).

Guard Stefan Marković holds the records of eight tournaments played in total and in a row.

In this list are not included players that:

- played at the qualification tournaments for named competitions, the Mediterranean Games, and other minor tournaments,
- represented Serbia and Montenegro (formerly FR Yugoslavia).

== Key ==
| | EuroBasket |
| | FIBA Basketball World Cup |
| | Summer Olympics |
| | Gold medal |
| | Silver medal |
| | Bronze medal |
| 4 | Uniform number |

== Players ==
Note: This list is correct through the end of EuroBasket 2025.

| Players | 07 | 09 | 10 | 11 | 13 | 14 | 15 | 16 | 17 | 19 | 22 | 23 | 24 | 25 | Total | Individual awards |
|---|---|---|---|---|---|---|---|---|---|---|---|---|---|---|---|---|
| Nemanja Aleksandrov | 12 | – | – | – | – | – | – | – | – | – | – | – | – | – | 1 | None |
| Danilo Anđušić | – | – | – | – | 13 | – | – | – | – | – | – | – | – | – | 1 | None |
| Aleksa Avramović | – | – | – | – | – | – | – | – | – | – | – | 30 | 30 | 30 | 3 | Olympics Best Defensive Player (2024) |
| Stefan Birčević | – | – | – | – | – | 11 | – | 12 | 14 | 14 | – | – | – | – | 4 | None |
| Nemanja Bjelica | – | 8 | 8 | 8 | 8 | 8 | 8 | – | – | 8 | – | – | – | – | 7 | None |
| Bogdan Bogdanović | – | – | – | – | 7 | 7 | 7 | 7 | 7 | 7 | – | 7 | 7 | 7 | 9 | 2× World Cup All-Tournament Team (2019, 2023); EuroBasket All-Tournament Team (2017); World Cup Top Scorer (2019); Olympics All-Second Team (2024) |
| Branko Cvetković | 5 | – | – | – | – | – | – | – | – | – | – | – | – | – | 1 | None |
| Dejan Davidovac | – | – | – | – | – | – | – | – | – | – | 7 | 27 | 27 | – | 3 | None |
| Ognjen Dobrić | – | – | – | – | – | – | – | – | – | – | – | 13 | 13 | 13 | 3 | None |
| Zoran Erceg | 7 | – | – | – | – | – | 14 | – | – | – | – | – | – | – | 2 | None |
| Đorđe Gagić | – | – | – | – | 11 | – | – | – | – | – | – | – | – | – | 1 | None |
| Marko Gudurić | – | – | – | – | – | – | – | – | 23 | 23 | 23 | 23 | 23 | 23 | 6 | None |
| Milan Gurović | 15 | – | – | – | – | – | – | – | – | – | – | – | – | – | 1 (Note: 6 in total. Played at 5 tournaments for Serbia and Montenegro) | None |
| Marko Jagodić-Kuridža | – | – | – | – | – | – | – | – | – | – | 21 | – | – | – | 1 | None |
| Ognjen Jaramaz | – | – | – | – | – | – | – | – | – | – | 25 | – | – | – | 1 | None |
| Marko Jarić | 10 | – | – | – | – | – | – | – | – | – | – | – | – | – | 1 (Note: 4 in total. Played at 3 tournaments for Serbia and Montenegro) | None |
| Nikola Jokić | – | – | – | – | – | – | – | 14 | – | 15 | 15 | – | 15 | 15 | 5 | Olympics All-Star Five (2024) |
| Nikola Jović | – | – | – | – | – | – | – | – | – | – | – | 5 | 5 | 5 | 3 | None |
| Stefan Jović | – | – | – | – | – | 6 | – | 24 | 24 | 24 | – | 24 | – | 24 | 6 | None |
| Nikola Kalinić | – | – | – | – | 10 | 10 | 10 | 10 | – | – | 10 | – | – | – | 5 | None |
| Raško Katić | – | – | – | – | 14 | 14 | – | – | – | – | – | – | – | – | 2 | None |
| Marko Kešelj | – | – | 11 | 11 | – | – | – | – | – | – | – | – | – | – | 2 | None |
| Nemanja Krstić | – | – | – | – | 5 | – | – | – | – | – | – | – | – | – | 1 | None |
| Nenad Krstić | – | 12 | 12 | 12 | 12 | 12 | – | – | – | – | – | – | – | – | 5 (Note: 7 in total. Played at 2 tournaments for Serbia and Montenegro) | None |
| Ognjen Kuzmić | – | – | – | – | – | – | 6 | – | 32 | – | – | – | – | – | 2 | None |
| Dragan Labović | 8 | – | – | – | – | – | – | – | – | – | – | – | – | – | 1 | None |
| Branko Lazić | – | – | – | – | – | – | – | – | 19 | – | – | – | – | – | 1 | None |
| Vladimir Lučić | – | – | – | – | – | – | – | – | 11 | 11 | 11 | – | – | – | 3 | None |
| Milan Mačvan | – | 15 | 15 | 15 | – | – | – | 25 | 6 | – | – | – | – | – | 5 | None |
| Vanja Marinković | – | – | – | – | – | – | – | – | – | – | 9 | 9 | 9 | 9 | 4 | None |
| Stefan Marković | 9 | 9 | 9 | 9 | 9 | 9 | 9 | 9 | – | – | – | – | – | – | 8 | None |
| Boban Marjanović | – | – | – | 14 | – | – | – | – | 51 | 51 | – | – | – | – | 3 | None |
| Vasilije Micić | – | – | – | – | 6 | – | – | – | 22 | 22 | 22 | – | 22 | 22 | 6 | None |
| Darko Miličić | 11 | – | – | – | – | – | – | – | – | – | – | – | – | – | 1 (Note: 3 in total. Played at 2 tournaments for Serbia and Montenegro) | None |
| Dragan Milosavljević | – | – | – | – | – | – | 12 | – | 12 | – | – | – | – | – | 2 | None |
| Nikola Milutinov | – | – | – | – | – | – | 15 | – | – | 21 | 33 | 33 | 33 | 33 | 6 | None |
| Nemanja Nedović | – | – | – | – | 4 | – | 11 | 11 | – | – | 16 | – | – | – | 4 | None |
| Ivan Paunić | – | 7 | 7 | 7 | – | – | – | – | – | – | – | – | – | – | 3 | None |
| Filip Petrušev | – | – | – | – | – | – | – | – | – | – | – | 3 | 3 | 3 | 3 | None |
| Kosta Perović | – | 13 | 13 | 13 | – | – | – | – | – | – | – | – | – | – | 3 | None |
| Uroš Plavšić | – | – | – | – | – | – | – | – | – | – | – | – | 0 | – | 1 | None |
| Bojan Popović | – | 4 | – | – | – | – | – | – | – | – | – | – | – | – | 1 | None |
| Vuk Radivojević | 6 | – | – | – | – | – | – | – | – | – | – | – | – | – | 1 | None |
| Miroslav Raduljica | – | 11 | – | – | – | 13 | 13 | 13 | – | 13 | – | – | – | – | 5 | None |
| Aleksandar Rašić | – | – | 6 | 6 | – | – | – | – | – | – | – | – | – | – | 2 | None |
| Dušan Ristić | – | – | – | – | – | – | – | – | – | – | 14 | 14 | – | – | 2 | None |
| Duško Savanović | – | – | 10 | 10 | – | – | – | – | – | – | – | – | – | – | 2 | None |
| Boriša Simanić | – | – | – | – | – | – | – | – | – | – | – | 28 | – | – | 1 | None |
| Marko Simonović | – | – | – | – | – | 5 | 5 | 5 | – | 5 | – | – | – | – | 4 | None |
| Vladimir Štimac | – | – | – | – | 15 | 15 | – | 15 | 15 | – | – | – | – | – | 4 | None |
| Miloš Teodosić | 4 | 6 | 4 | 4 | – | 4 | 4 | 4 | – | – | – | – | – | – | 7 | 2× World Cup All-Tournament Team (2010, 2014); EuroBasket All-Tournament Team (2009); 2× EuroBasket Assists Leader (2009, 2011) |
| Milenko Tepić | 14 | 5 | 5 | 5 | – | – | – | – | – | – | – | – | – | – | 4 | None |
| Uroš Tripković | – | 10 | – | – | – | – | – | – | – | – | – | – | – | – | 1 (Note: 2 in total. Played at one tournament for Serbia and Montenegro) | None |
| Novica Veličković | 13 | 14 | 14 | – | – | – | – | – | – | – | – | – | – | – | 3 | None |
| Tristan Vukčević | – | – | – | – | – | – | – | – | – | – | – | – | – | 11 | 1 | None |

== Footers ==
=== See also ===
- List of Yugoslavia men's national basketball team rosters
- 2016 Serbia OQT basketball team
- Serbia at the 2019 FIBA Basketball World Cup qualification
- Serbia at the EuroBasket 2022 qualification

=== External links ===
- Official website
