= List of Serbia and Montenegro men's national basketball team players =

This is a list of men's national basketball team players who represented Serbia and Montenegro (formerly FR Yugoslavia) at the EuroBasket, the FIBA Basketball World Cup, and the Summer Olympics.

The Serbia and Montenegro squad participated at six EuroBasket tournaments (1995, 1997, 1999, 2001, 2003, 2005), three Basketball World Cups (1998, 2002, 2006), and three Summer Olympics (1996, 2000, 2004).

In this list are not included players that:

- played at the qualification tournaments for named competitions, the Mediterranean Games, and other minor tournaments,
- represented SFR Yugoslavia (1947–1991) and Serbia or Montenegro (2007 onwards).

== Key ==
	EuroBasket
	FIBA Basketball World Cup
	Summer Olympics
	Gold medal
	Silver medal
	Bronze medal
4	Uniform number

== Players ==
Note: This list is correct through the end of the 2006 FIBA World Championship.

Players	Yugoslavia								Ser. & Mne.				Total	Individual awards
Players	95	96	97	98	99	00	01	02	03	04	05	06	Total	Individual awards
Ognjen Aškrabić	–	–	–	–	–	–	–	–	12	–	–	14	2	None
Vule Avdalović	–	–	–	–	–	–	–	–	7	10	6	6	4	None
Miroslav Berić	9	9	9	9	–	–	–	–	–	–	–	–	4	None
Dejan Bodiroga	4	4	4	4	4	4	4	4	–	4	4	–	10	FIBA World Cup MVP (1998); World Cup All-Tournament Team (1998); 2× EuroBasket All-Tournament Team (1997, 1999)
Nebojša Bogavac	–	–	–	–	–	–	–	–	6	–	–	–	1	None
Nikola Bulatović	–	–	12	13	–	–	–	–	–	–	–	–	2	None
Žarko Čabarkapa	–	–	–	–	–	–	–	6	–	–	–	–	1	None
Predrag Danilović	5	5	5	–	5	5	–	–	–	–	–	–	5 (Note: 7 in total. Played at 2 tournaments for Yugoslavia.)	None
Vlade Divac	12	12	–	–	12	–	–	12	–	–	–	–	4 (Note: 10 in total. Played at 6 tournaments for Yugoslavia.)	EuroBasket All-Tournament Team (1995)
Predrag Drobnjak	–	–	–	12	–	13	11	11	11	11	–	–	6	None
Aleksandar Đorđević	10	10	10	10	–	–	–	–	–	–	–	–	4 (Note: 6 in total. Played at 2 tournaments for Yugoslavia.)	EuroBasket MVP (1997); EuroBasket All-Tournament Team (1997)
Milan Gurović	–	–	–	–	8	–	15	15	15	–	15	–	5 (Note: 6 in total. Played at one tournament for Serbia.)	None
Mile Ilić	–	–	–	–	–	–	–	–	–	–	–	9	1	None
Marko Jarić	–	–	–	–	–	–	–	10	10	–	10	–	3 (Note: 4 in total. Played at one tournament for Serbia.)	None
Nikola Jestratijević	–	–	–	–	–	15	–	–	–	–	–	–	1	None
Branko Jorović	–	–	–	–	–	–	–	–	–	–	–	5	1	None
Dejan Koturović	15	–	–	–	–	–	–	5	5	–	–	–	3	None
Nenad Krstić	–	–	–	–	–	–	–	–	–	12	12	–	2 (Note: 7 in total. Played at 5 tournaments for Serbia.)	None
Nikola Lončar	–	7	7	7	7	–	–	–	–	–	–	–	4	None
Dragan Lukovski	–	–	–	8	10	10	–	–	–	–	–	–	3	None
Marko Marinović	–	–	–	–	–	–	–	–	–	–	–	13	1	None
Darko Miličić	–	–	–	–	–	–	–	–	–	–	5	11	2 (Note: 3 in total. Played at one tournament for Serbia.)	None
Dejan Milojević	–	–	–	–	–	–	13	–	–	–	13	–	2	None
Goran Nikolić	–	–	–	–	–	–	–	–	–	–	–	12	1	None
Saša Obradović	6	6	6	6	6	6	6	–	–	–	–	–	7	None
Đuro Ostojić	–	–	–	–	–	–	–	–	9	6	–	–	2	None
Žarko Paspalj	8	8	–	–	–	–	–	–	–	–	–	–	2 (Note: 7 in total. Played at 5 tournaments for Yugoslavia.)	None
Aleksandar Pavlović	–	–	–	–	–	–	–	–	–	15	–	–	1	None
Veselin Petrović	–	–	–	–	–	–	5	–	–	–	–	–	1	None
Kosta Perović	–	–	–	–	–	–	–	–	14	–	–	15	2	None
Bojan Popović	–	–	–	–	–	–	–	–	–	–	–	4	1	None
Petar Popović	–	–	–	–	–	–	–	–	–	5	–	–	1	None
Vladimir Radmanović	–	–	–	–	–	–	–	9	7	7	7	–	4	None
Miroslav Radošević	–	–	8	–	–	–	–	–	–	–	–	–	1	None
Miroslav Raičević	–	–	–	–	–	–	–	–	–	–	–	7	1	None
Igor Rakočević	–	–	–	–	–	7	7	7	–	8	8	8	6	None
Željko Rebrača	11	11	11	11	–	11	–	–	–	–	11	–	6	World Cup All-Tournament Team (1998); EuroBasket All-Tournament Team (1997)
Zoran Savić	13	13	13	–	–	–	–	–	–	–	–	–	3 (Note: 5 in total. Played at 2 tournaments for Yugoslavia.)	None
Zoran Sretenović	7	–	–	–	–	–	–	–	–	–	–	–	1 (Note: 2 in total. Played at one tournament for Yugoslavia.)	None
Predrag Stojaković	–	–	–	–	11	8	8	8	8	–	–	–	5	EuroBasket MVP (2001); World Cup All-Tournament Team (2002); EuroBasket All-Tournament Team (2001)
Vlado Šćepanović	–	–	–	5	9	9	9	–	–	9	9	–	6 (Note: 7 in total. Played at one tournament for Montenegro.)	None
Dragan Tarlać	–	–	–	–	13	12	12	–	–	–	–	–	3	None
Dejan Tomašević	14	14	14	14	14	14	14	14	–	14	14	–	10	None
Milenko Topić	–	15	15	15	15	–	–	–	–	–	–	–	4	None
Uroš Tripković	–	–	–	–	–	–	–	–	–	–	–	10	1 (Note: 2 in total. Played at one tournament for Serbia.)	None
Miloš Vujanić	–	–	–	–	–	–	–	13	13	13	–	–	3	None
Dušan Vukčević	–	–	–	–	–	–	–	–	4	–	–	–	1	None

== Footers ==
=== See also ===
- List of Serbia men's national basketball team players
- List of Yugoslavia men's national basketball team rosters

=== External links ===
- Official website
