= Serbia at the 2019 FIBA Basketball World Cup qualification =

Serbia
- President: Predrag Danilović
- Head coach: Aleksandar Đorđević
- Arena: Aleksandar Nikolić Hall, Belgrade; SPC Vojvodina, Novi Sad
- First round: 2nd
- Second round: 3rd
- PIR leader: Boban Marjanović 23.0
- Scoring leader: Boban Marjanović 17.5
- Rebounding leader: Nemanja Bjelica 9.0
- Assists leader: Miloš Teodosić 9.5
- Highest home attendance: 8,800; 81–88 Germany (2 July 2018)
- Lowest home attendance: 4,278; 85–64 Austria (24 November 2017)
- Average home attendance: 6,167
- Biggest win: Georgia 50–87 (29 June 2018)
- Biggest defeat: 74–83 Israel (30 November 2018)
- All statistics correct as of February 26, 2019.

The Serbia team for 2019 FIBA Basketball World Cup qualification represented Serbia at the 2019 FIBA Basketball World Cup qualification in Europe. The team was coached by Aleksandar Đorđević, with assistant coaches Miroslav Nikolić, Milan Minić, and Jovica Antonić. The team has qualified for the 2019 FIBA Basketball World Cup in China.

== Timeline ==
- October 20, 2017: 35-man roster announced
- November 6, 2017: 24-man roster announced
- November 2017 – July 2018: First round
- September 2018 – February 2019: Second round

== Roster ==
The following are all players who appeared at least in one game during the 2019 FIBA Basketball World Cup qualification:

Serbia men's national basketball team roster
Players
Coaches

Pos.	No.	Name	Age – Date of birth	Height	Club	Ctr.
SF	0	Aleksa Radanov	21 – February 1, 1998	2.02 m (6 ft 8 in)	Crvena zvezda mts	(Serbia)
PG	4	Miloš Teodosić	31 – March 19, 1987	1.96 m (6 ft 5 in)	Free agent
SF	5	Marko Simonović	32 – May 30, 1986	2.01 m (6 ft 7 in)	Zenit St. Petersburg	(Russia)
PF	6	Stevan Jelovac	29 – July 8, 1989	2.08 m (6 ft 10 in)	Brose Bamberg	(Germany)
PF	6	Milan Mačvan	29 – November 16, 1989	2.06 m (6 ft 9 in)	Bayern Munich	(Germany)
SG	7	Bogdan Bogdanović	26 – August 18, 1992	1.98 m (6 ft 6 in)	Sacramento Kings	(United States)
SG	7	Ivan Paunić	32 – January 27, 1987	1.95 m (6 ft 5 in)	Tofaş	(Turkey)
F	8	Nemanja Bjelica	30 – May 9, 1988	2.09 m (6 ft 10 in)	Sacramento Kings	(United States)
PF	8	Sava Lešić	30 – February 23, 1988	2.06 m (6 ft 9 in)	Igokea	(Bosnia and Herzegovina)
SG	8	Milenko Tepić	31 – February 27, 1987	2.02 m (6 ft 8 in)	P.A.O.K.	(Greece)
SG	9	Vanja Marinković	22 – January 9, 1997	1.98 m (6 ft 6 in)	Partizan NIS	(Serbia)
SF	10	Nikola Kalinić	27 – November 8, 1991	2.02 m (6 ft 8 in)	Fenerbahce	(Turkey)
SG	12	Dragan Milosavljević	29 – May 11, 1989	1.98 m (6 ft 6 in)	Unicaja	(Spain)
C	13	Miroslav Raduljica	31 – January 5, 1988	2.13 m (7 ft 0 in)	Jiangsu Dragons	(China)
PF	14	Stefan Birčević	29 – December 13, 1989	2.10 m (6 ft 11 in)	Baskets Bonn	(Germany)
G	16	Nemanja Nedović	27 – June 16, 1991	1.92 m (6 ft 4 in)	Olimpia Milano	(Italy)
G	19	Branko Lazić	30 – January 12, 1989	1.95 m (6 ft 5 in)	Crvena zvezda mts	(Serbia)
F	19	Vladimir Lučić	29 – June 17, 1989	2.04 m (6 ft 8 in)	Bayern Munich	(Germany)
SF	20	Dejan Todorović	24 – May 29, 1994	1.96 m (6 ft 5 in)	UCAM Murcia	(Spain)
PG	21	Ognjen Jaramaz	24 – January 9, 1995	1.93 m (6 ft 4 in)	Partizan NIS	(Serbia)
F/C	21	Nikola Jovanović	25 – January 6, 1994	2.11 m (6 ft 11 in)	Dolomiti Energia Trento	(Italy)
PG	22	Vasilije Micić	25 – January 13, 1994	1.95 m (6 ft 5 in)	Anadolu Efes	(Turkey)
C	22	Nikola Milutinov	24 – December 13, 1994	2.13 m (7 ft 0 in)	Olympiacos	(Greece)
G	24	Stefan Jović	28 – November 3, 1990	1.98 m (6 ft 6 in)	Bayern Munich	(Germany)
PG	25	Ilija Đoković	23 – January 5, 1996	1.88 m (6 ft 2 in)	Borac	(Serbia)
PG	30	Aleksa Avramović	24 – October 25, 1994	1.92 m (6 ft 4 in)	Varese	(Italy)
SG	31	Ognjen Dobrić	24 – October 27, 1994	1.98 m (6 ft 6 in)	Crvena zvezda mts	(Serbia)
F/C	41	Đorđe Gagić	28 – December 28, 1990	2.10 m (6 ft 11 in)	Partizan NIS	(Serbia)
PG	44	Stefan Peno	21 – August 3, 1997	1.98 m (6 ft 6 in)	Alba Berlin	(Germany)
C	51	Boban Marjanović	30 – August 15, 1988	2.22 m (7 ft 3 in)	Philadelphia 76ers	(United States)

Head coach

- (Serbia) Aleksandar Đorđević

Assistant coach(es)

- (Serbia) Jovica Antonić
- (Serbia) Milan Minić
- (Serbia) Miroslav Nikolić

Legend

- (C) Team captain
- Club – describes
  club on 21 February 2019
- Age – describes age
  on 21 February 2019

=== Depth chart ===
Selected players (12/30) with 5 or more games played. Number in parentheses indicates how many times player was in a starting line-up.

Pos.	Starting 5	Bench 1	Bench 2
C	Miroslav Raduljica (7)	Nikola Milutinov (4)	Đorđe Gagić (1)
PF	Stefan Birčević (5)	Stevan Jelovac (3)
SF	Dejan Todorović (4)	Marko Simonović (4)
SG	Dragan Milosavljević (6)	Milenko Tepić (2)
PG	Stefan Peno (5)	Vasilije Micić (2)	Ilija Đoković (0)

== Staff ==
Position	Staff member	Age	Team
Head coach	(Serbia) Aleksandar Đorđević	50	—N/a
Assistant coaches	(Serbia) Miroslav Nikolić	62	(Serbia) Dynamic VIP PAY
Assistant coaches	(Serbia) Jovica Antonić	52	—N/a
Assistant coaches	(Serbia) Milan Minić	63	—N/a
Team manager	(Serbia) Nebojša Ilić	50	(Serbia) Crvena zvezda
Conditioning coaches	(Serbia) Mladen Mihajlović	33	—N/a
Conditioning coaches	(Serbia) Denis Krdžalić		(United States) Hawaii
Scouts	(Serbia) Dragan Popov		—N/a
Scouts	(Serbia) Goran Topić	51	(Serbia) Vršac
Physicians	(Serbia) Dragan Radovanović		—N/a
Physicians	(Serbia) Milan Mirković		—N/a
Physiotherapists	(Serbia) Dušan Sajić		—N/a
Physiotherapists	(Serbia) Velibor Kosanović		(Serbia) Vršac
Physiotherapists	(Serbia) Marko Sokić		(Serbia) Dynamic VIP PAY
Equipment Manager	(Serbia) Jovica Aničić		—N/a
Press Officer	(Serbia) Vladimir Sibinović		—N/a

Source: KSS

== Uniform ==
- Supplier: Peak
- Main sponsor: Triglav

Home	Away

== Exhibition games ==
Serbia played one exhibition game.

8 September 2018

Report

Serbia	99–43	Hungary
Scoring by quarter: 24–9, 22–7, 34–9, 19–18
Pts: Bjelica 15; Rebs: not available Asts: not available		Pts: not available Rebs: not available Asts: not available

Aleksandar Nikolić Hall, Belgrade
Attendance: not available
Referees: not available

== Qualification ==
=== First round – Group G ===
Pos	Team	Pld	W	L	PF	PA	PD	Pts	Qualification
1	Germany	6	6	0	508	414	+94	12	Advance to the second round
2	Serbia	6	4	2	514	449	+65	10	Advance to the second round
3	Georgia	6	2	4	460	495	−35	8	Advance to the second round
4	Austria	6	0	6	394	518	−124	6	Relegated to the EuroBasket Pre-Qualifiers second round

Source: FIBA
Rules for classification: 1) Points; 2) Head-to-head results; 3) Points difference; 4) Points scored.

==== Austria (Home) ====
24 November 2017
20:00

Boxscore

Serbia	85–64	Austria
Scoring by quarter: 17–12, 27–17, 15–13, 26–22
Pts: Paunić 16; Rebs: Raduljica 8 Asts: Peno, Đoković 4		Pts: Mahalbašić 15; Rebs: Radoš 5 Asts: Schreiner 8

Aleksandar Nikolić Hall, Belgrade
Attendance: 4,278
Referees: Oskars Lucis (LAT), Sergei Beliakov (RUS), Özlem Yalman (TUR)

==== Georgia (Home) ====
27 November 2017
20:00

Boxscore

Serbia	105–87	Georgia
Scoring by quarter: 21–21, 23–24, 30–19, 31–23
Pts: Raduljica 28; Rebs: Raduljica 8 Asts: Peno 9		Pts: Dixon 36; Rebs: Markoishvili 7 Asts: Dixon 9

Aleksandar Nikolić Hall, Belgrade
Attendance: 5,890
Referees: Tolga Sahin (ITA), Marius Ciulin (ROU), Anastasios Manos (GRE)

==== Germany (Away) ====
22 February 2018
19:30

Boxscore

Germany	79–74	Serbia
Scoring by quarter: 20–26, 20–15, 17–18, 22–15
Pts: Benzing 17; Rebs: Akpınar 5 Asts: Doreth 4		Pts: Raduljica 22; Rebs: Lešić 7 Asts: Paunić 4

Fraport Arena, Frankfurt
Attendance: 5,002
Referees: Manuel Mazzoni (ITA), Fernando Calatrava (ESP), Gentian Cici (ALB)

==== Austria (Away) ====
25 February 2018
20:20

Boxscore

Austria	81–82	Serbia
Scoring by quarter: 18–21, 25–20, 20–25, 18–16
Pts: Mahalbašić 22; Rebs: Mahalbašić 9 Asts: Schreiner 7		Pts: Jelovac 21; Rebs: Simonović 5 Asts: Avramović 5

Multiversum, Schwechat
Attendance: 3,000
Referees: Panagiotis Anastopoulos (GRE), Petr Hrůša (CZE), Tanel Suslov (EST)

==== Georgia (Away) ====
29 June 2018
19:00 (GMT+4)

Boxscore

Georgia	50–87	Serbia
Scoring by quarter: 11–18, 7–19, 18–23, 14–27
Pts: McFadden 18; Rebs: Shengelia 8 Asts: Tsintsadze 2		Pts: Todorović 24; Rebs: Micić 7 Asts: Micić 5

Tbilisi Sports Palace, Tbilisi
Attendance: 8,000
Referees: Tomas Jasevičius (LTU), Marius Ciulin (ROU), Zafer Yılmaz (TUR)

==== Germany (Home) ====
2 July 2018
20:00

Boxscore

Serbia	81–88	Germany
Scoring by quarter: 23–21, 18–14, 19–21, 21–32
Pts: Marjanović 22; Rebs: Marjanović 11; Asts: Micić 10		Pts: Schröder 21; Rebs: Kleber 7 Asts: Schröder 6

SPC Vojvodina, Novi Sad
Attendance: 8,800
Referees: Manuel Mazzoni (ITA), Andris Aunkrogers (LAT), Ciprian Stoica (ROU)

=== Second round – Group L ===
Pos	Team	Pld	W	L	PF	PA	PD	Pts	Qualification
1	Greece	12	11	1	972	880	+92	23	Qualification to the FIBA Basketball World Cup
2	Germany	12	9	3	1017	867	+150	21	Qualification to the FIBA Basketball World Cup
3	Serbia	12	7	5	993	875	+118	19	Qualification to the FIBA Basketball World Cup
4	Georgia	12	5	7	927	968	−41	17 (Note: Georgia 2–0; Israel 0–2)	Qualification to the EuroBasket Qualifiers
5	Israel	12	5	7	925	974	−49	17	Qualification to the EuroBasket Qualifiers
6	Estonia	12	4	8	821	950	−129	16	Qualification to the EuroBasket Qualifiers

Source: FIBA
Rules for classification: 1) Points; 2) Head-to-head results; 3) Points difference; 4) Points scored.

==== Greece (Away) ====
13 September 2018
20:00

Boxscore

Greece	70–63	Serbia
Scoring by quarter: 16–18, 19–14, 16–15, 19–16
Pts: Calathes, Printezis 15; Rebs: Bourousis 10; Asts: Bourousis 8		Pts: Bogdanović 19; Rebs: Bjelica 12; Asts: Bjelica 5

Heraklion Arena, Heraklion
Attendance: 5,222
Referees: Mārtiņš Kozlovskis (LAT), Marek Cmikiewicz (POL), Sergiy Zashchuk (UKR)

==== Estonia (Home) ====
16 September 2018
20:15

Boxscore

Serbia	91–65	Estonia
Scoring by quarter: 22–16, 23–13, 29–11, 17–25
Pts: Bjelica 14; Rebs: Bjelica 6 Asts: Micić, Jović 4		Pts: Kajupank 17; Rebs: Raieste 4 Asts: Kullamäe, Veideman 5

Aleksandar Nikolić Hall, Belgrade
Attendance: 5,700
Referees: Antonio Conde (ESP), Yener Yılmaz (TUR), Mehmet Karabilecen (TUR)

==== Israel (Away) ====
30 November 2018
14:00 (GMT+2)

Boxscore

Israel	83–74	Serbia
Scoring by quarter: 29–24, 14–21, 16–15, 24–14
Pts: Pnini 18; Rebs: four players 3 Asts: Blatt 9		Pts: Milosavljević; Rebs: Peno 8 Asts: Peno 6

Menora Mivtachim Arena, Tel Aviv
Attendance: 3,200
Referees: Yohan Rosso (FRA), Marius Ciulin (ROM), Zafer Yilmaz (TUR)

==== Greece (Home) ====
3 December 2018
20:15 (GMT+1)

Boxscore

Serbia	84–61	Greece
Scoring by quarter: 29–14, 15–21, 23–13, 17–13
Pts: Jović 22; Rebs: Jelovac 7 Asts: Micić, Raduljica 6		Pts: Bochoridis, Saloustros 12; Rebs: Vasilopoulos 5 Asts: Vasilopoulos, Larentzakis 4

Aleksandar Nikolic Hall, Belgrade
Attendance: 5,780
Referees: Manuel Mazzoni (ITA), Marek Cmikiewicz (POL), Lorenzo Baldini (ITA)

==== Estonia (Away) ====
21 February 2019
19:00 (GMT+2)

Boxscore

Estonia	71–70	Serbia
Scoring by quarter: 14–16, 17–18, 18–20, 22–16
Pts: Kitsing, Kullamäe 18; Rebs: Jõesaar 9 Asts: Raieste 5		Pts: Jelovac 19; Rebs: Jelovac 8 Asts: Teodosić 10

Saku Suurhall, Tallinn
Attendance: 4,585
Referees: Saverio Lanzarini (ITA), Mārtiņš Kozlovskis (LAT), Dariusz Zapolski (POL)

==== Israel (Home) ====
24 February 2019
16:00

Boxscore

Serbia	97–76	Israel
Scoring by quarter: 26–18, 23–15, 18–17, 30–26
Pts: Lučić 22; Rebs: Jelovac 6 Asts: Teodosić 9		Pts: Cohen 16; Rebs: Cline 6 Asts: Zoosman 5

Aleksandar Nikolić Hall, Belgrade
Attendance: 6,890
Referees: Antonio Conde (ESP), Yener Yılmaz (TUR), Fernando Calatrava (ESP)

=== Statistics ===
Legend
GP	Games played	GS	Games started	MPG	Minutes per game
FG%	Field-goal percentage	3FG%	3-point field-goal percentage	FT%	Free-throw percentage
RPG	Rebounds per game	APG	Assists per game	SPG	Steals per game
BPG	Blocks per game	PPG	Points per game	EF	PIR per game

Player	GP	GS	MPG	FG%	3FG%	FT%	RPG	APG	SPG	BPG	PPG	EF
Aleksa Avramović	4	0	13.1	.529	.500	.625	1.3	2.0	.0	.0	6.5	4.8
Stefan Birčević	7	5	17.0	.600	.473	.571	3.4	0.9	.6	.0	8.0	9.9
Nemanja Bjelica	2	2	23.6	.455	.200	.250	9.0	3.5	2.0	.0	11.5	18.0
Bogdan Bogdanović	2	2	18.6	.318	.267	1.00	2.5	1.0	1.5	.0	11.0	5.5
Ognjen Dobrić	3	0	2.9	1.00	.000	.000	.0	.3	.3	.0	0.7	1.3
Ilija Đoković	8	0	9.7	.300	.385	.500	.9	1.0	.0	.0	2.4	1.8
Đorđe Gagić	8	1	7.5	.417	.000	.917	2.1	.6	.3	.3	2.6	4.3
Ognjen Jaramaz	2	0	6.3	.000	.000	.000	.5	1.0	1.0	.0	0.0	0.5
Stevan Jelovac	9	3	22.3	.451	.321	.868	4.9	1.1	.7	.3	11.8	12.4
Nikola Jovanović	1	0	1.3	1.00	.000	.000	2.0	.0	.0	.0	2.0	4.0
Stefan Jović	3	3	26.2	.625	.429	.833	2.3	3.3	2.0	.0	12.7	13.7
Nikola Kalinić	2	0	14.0	.286	.400	.250	1.5	1.0	.5	.0	3.5	2.5
Branko Lazić	2	0	15.6	1.00	1.00	.000	1.0	.0	.0	.5	4.5	6.0
Sava Lešić	2	0	7.5	.000	.000	.500	3.5	.0	.0	.0	1.0	1.5
Vladimir Lučić	3	2	18.8	.688	.800	.875	2.3	1.0	.7	.0	11.0	12.3
Milan Mačvan	2	2	22.9	.417	.333	.800	3.5	4.5	.5	.0	12.0	14.5
Vanja Marinković	2	0	2.7	1.00	.000	1.00	1.0	.0	.0	.0	2.5	3.5
Boban Marjanović	2	0	20.0	.812	1.00	.727	8.5	1.5	.5	.0	17.5	23.0
Vasilije Micić	5	2	21.7	.273	.158	.692	3.6	5.6	2.2	.0	6.0	9.8
Dragan Milosavljević	8	6	26.5	.556	.409	.812	2.9	2.0	.8	.0	11.5	11.8
Nikola Milutinov	5	4	20.7	.692	.0	.846	3.6	1.0	.4	1.4	9.4	13.0
Nemanja Nedović	2	0	17.1	.500	.400	1.00	2.0	.5	.0	.0	7.5	7.0
Ivan Paunić	4	4	26.2	.516	.286	.286	3.0	3.8	1.0	.5	10.0	9.8
Stefan Peno	8	5	19.6	.323	.273	.583	2.6	3.0	.9	.0	3.8	5.0
Aleksa Radanov	2	0	1.8	1.00	1.00	.000	.0	.0	.0	.0	1.5	1.0
Miroslav Raduljica	10	7	21.2	.585	1.00	.706	4.9	2.3	1.3	.4	13.3	14.8
Marko Simonović	12	4	22.4	.519	.394	.733	2.6	.8	.7	.2	6.5	7.9
Miloš Teodosić	2	2	30.5	.304	.368	1.00	1.5	9.5	1.5	.0	13.5	13.5
Milenko Tepić	6	2	17.0	.250	.000	.800	2.5	1.7	.7	.0	2.0	3.8
Dejan Todorović	5	4	23.0	.476	.318	.692	3.6	2.6	1.4	.0	11.2	12.2
Total	12	12	200.0	.491	.356	.728	36.5	20.0	8.2	1.8	82.8	95.1

Last updated: February 24, 2019.
Source: 2019 FIBA Basketball World Cup qualification

== See also ==
- 2017 Serbia EuroBasket team
