= Basketball at the 2004 Summer Olympics – Men's team rosters =

This is a list of the players who were on the rosters of the teams who participated in the 2004 Summer Olympics for men's basketball.

== Group A ==
=== Argentina ===
The following is the Argentina roster in the men's basketball tournament of the 2004 Summer Olympics.

Argentina men's national basketball team – 2004 Summer Olympics roster
Players
Coaches

Pos.	No.	Name	Age – Date of birth	Height	Club	Ctr.
PG	4	Juan Ignacio Sánchez	27 – 8 April 1977	1.93 m (6 ft 4 in)	Etosa Alicante	(Spain)
SG	5	Manu Ginóbili	27 – 28 July 1977	1.98 m (6 ft 6 in)	San Antonio Spurs	(United States)
PG	6	Alejandro Montecchia	32 – 1 January 1972	1.82 m (6 ft 0 in)	Pamesa Valencia	(Spain)
C	7	Fabricio Oberto	29 – 21 March 1975	2.08 m (6 ft 10 in)	Pamesa Valencia	(Spain)
SF	8	Walter Herrmann	25 – 26 June 1979	2.03 m (6 ft 8 in)	Unicaja Málaga	(Spain)
C	9	Gabriel Fernández	27 – 23 October 1976	2.04 m (6 ft 8 in)	Fórum Valladolid	(Spain)
SG	10	Hugo Sconochini (C)	33 – 10 April 1971	1.92 m (6 ft 4 in)	Olimpia Milano	(Italy)
PF	11	Luis Scola	24 – 30 April 1980	2.06 m (6 ft 9 in)	Tau Cerámica	(Spain)
PF	12	Leonardo Gutiérrez	26 – 16 May 1978	2.00 m (6 ft 7 in)	Obras Sanitarias	(Argentina)
SF	13	Andrés Nocioni	24 – 30 November 1979	2.01 m (6 ft 7 in)	Tau Cerámica	(Spain)
SF	14	Carlos Delfino	21 – 29 August 1982	1.98 m (6 ft 6 in)	Skipper Bologna	(Italy)
C	15	Rubén Wolkowyski	30 – 30 September 1973	2.08 m (6 ft 10 in)	Olympiacos B.C.	(Greece)

Head coach

- (Argentina) Rubén Magnano

Legend

- (C) Team captain
- nat field describes country
  of last club
  before the tournament
- Age as of August 13, 2004

=== China ===
The following is the China roster in the men's basketball tournament of the 2004 Summer Olympics.

China men's national basketball team – 2004 Summer Olympics roster
Players
Coaches

Pos.	No.	Name	Age – Date of birth	Height	Club	Ctr.
F	4	Chen Ke	25 – 16 May 1979	2.04 m (6 ft 8 in)	Bayi Rockets	(China)
G	5	Liu Wei	24 – 15 January 1980	1.90 m (6 ft 3 in)	Shanghai Sharks	(China)
G	6	Zhang Jingsong	27 – 20 March 1977	1.82 m (6 ft 0 in)	Beijing Ducks	(China)
G	7	Guo Shiqiang	29 – 8 July 1975	1.92 m (6 ft 4 in)	Liaoning Hunters	(China)
F	8	Zhu Fangyu	21 – 5 January 1983	2.01 m (6 ft 7 in)	Guangdong Southern Tigers	(China)
F	9	Zhang Yunsong	30 – 2 September 1973	1.98 m (6 ft 6 in)	Bayi Rockets	(China)
F	10	Li Nan (C)	27 – 25 September 1976	1.98 m (6 ft 6 in)	Bayi Rockets	(China)
F	11	Yi Jianlian	16 – 27 October 1987	2.12 m (6 ft 11 in)	Guangdong Southern Tigers	(China)
F	12	Mo Ke	21 – 8 September 1982	2.08 m (6 ft 10 in)	Shenyang Army	(China)
C	13	Yao Ming	23 – 12 September 1980	2.26 m (7 ft 5 in)	Houston Rockets	(United States)
C	14	Mengke Bateer	28 – 20 November 1975	2.10 m (6 ft 11 in)	Toronto Raptors	(Canada)
F	15	Du Feng	23 – 30 July 1981	2.07 m (6 ft 9 in)	Guangdong Southern Tigers	(China)

Head coach

- (United States) Del Harris

Assistant coach(es)

- (Lithuania) Jonas Kazlauskas
- (China) Adiljan Jun

Legend

- (C) Team captain
- nat field describes country
  of last club
  before the tournament
- Age as of August 13, 2004

=== Italy ===
The following is the Italy roster in the men's basketball tournament of the 2004 Summer Olympics.

Italy men's national basketball team – 2004 Summer Olympics roster
Players
Coaches

Pos.	No.	Name	Age – Date of birth	Height	Club	Ctr.
F	4	Nikola Radulović	31 – 26 April 1973	2.07 m (6 ft 9 in)	Joventut Badalona	(Spain)
G	5	Gianluca Basile	29 – 24 January 1975	1.92 m (6 ft 4 in)	Skipper Bologna	(Italy)
F	6	Giacomo Galanda (C)	29 – 30 January 1975	2.10 m (6 ft 11 in)	Montepaschi Siena	(Italy)
G	7	Matteo Soragna	28 – 26 December 1975	1.97 m (6 ft 6 in)	Lauretana Biella	(Italy)
C	8	Denis Marconato	29 – 29 July 1975	2.11 m (6 ft 11 in)	Benetton Treviso	(Italy)
G	9	Gianmarco Pozzecco	31 – 15 September 1972	1.80 m (5 ft 11 in)	Skipper Bologna	(Italy)
G	10	Alex Righetti	26 – 14 August 1977	2.00 m (6 ft 7 in)	Lottomatica Roma	(Italy)
G	11	Rodolfo Rombaldoni	27 – 15 December 1976	1.93 m (6 ft 4 in)	Tris Reggio Calabria	(Italy)
G	12	Massimo Bulleri	26 – 10 September 1977	1.88 m (6 ft 2 in)	Benetton Treviso	(Italy)
G	13	Michele Mian	31 – 18 July 1973	1.93 m (6 ft 4 in)	Snaidero Udine	(Italy)
C	14	Roberto Chiacig	29 – 1 December 1974	2.10 m (6 ft 11 in)	Montepaschi Siena	(Italy)
C	15	Luca Garri	22 – 3 January 1982	2.04 m (6 ft 8 in)	Mabo Livorno	(Italy)

Head coach

- (Italy) Carlo Recalcati

Assistant coach(es)

- (Italy) Fabrizio Frates
- (Italy) Giovanni Piccin

Legend

- (C) Team captain
- nat field describes country
  of last club
  before the tournament
- Age as of August 13, 2004

=== New Zealand ===
The following is the New Zealand roster in the men's basketball tournament of the 2004 Summer Olympics.

New Zealand men's national basketball team – 2004 Summer Olympics roster
Players
Coaches

Pos.	No.	Name	Age – Date of birth	Height	Club	Ctr.
G	4	Mark Dickel	27 – 21 December 1976	1.87 m (6 ft 2 in)	Fenerbahçe	(Turkey)
G/F	5	Pāora Winitana	27 – 6 December 1976	1.96 m (6 ft 5 in)	New Zealand Breakers	(New Zealand)
G	6	Kirk Penney	23 – 23 November 1980	1.96 m (6 ft 5 in)	Auna Gran Canaria	(Spain)
G	7	Paul Henare	25 – 4 March 1979	1.82 m (6 ft 0 in)	New Zealand Breakers	(New Zealand)
G	8	Phill Jones	30 – 25 March 1974	1.97 m (6 ft 6 in)	New Zealand Breakers	(New Zealand)
G	9	Aaron Olson	26 – 11 May 1978	1.95 m (6 ft 5 in)	New Zealand Breakers	(New Zealand)
F	10	Dillon Boucher	28 – 27 December 1975	1.96 m (6 ft 5 in)	New Zealand Breakers	(New Zealand)
F	11	Pero Cameron (C)	30 – 5 June 1974	2.00 m (6 ft 7 in)	New Zealand Breakers	(New Zealand)
F/C	12	Sean Marks	28 – 23 August 1975	2.08 m (6 ft 10 in)	San Antonio Spurs	(United States)
C	14	Ed Book	33 – 23 September 1970	2.10 m (6 ft 11 in)	Nelson Giants	(New Zealand)
C	15	Tony Rampton	28 – 30 May 1976	2.13 m (7 ft 0 in)	Cairns Taipans	(Australia)

Head coach

- (United States) Tab Baldwin

Assistant coach(es)

- (New Zealand) Murray McMahon
- (New Zealand) Nenad Vučinić

Legend

- (C) Team captain
- nat field describes country
  of last club
  before the tournament
- Age as of 13 August 2004

=== Serbia and Montenegro ===
The following is the Serbia and Montenegro roster in the men's basketball tournament of the 2004 Summer Olympics.

Serbia and Montenegro men's national basketball team – 2004 Summer Olympics roster
Players
Coaches

Pos.	No.	Name	Age – Date of birth	Height	Club	Ctr.
G	4	Dejan Bodiroga (C)	31 – 2 March 1973	2.03 m (6 ft 8 in)	FC Barcelona	(Spain)
C	5	Petar Popović	25 – 28 July 1979	2.11 m (6 ft 11 in)	Hemofarm	(Serbia and Montenegro)
C	6	Đuro Ostojić	28 – 17 February 1976	2.07 m (6 ft 9 in)	Partizan	(Serbia and Montenegro)
F	7	Vladimir Radmanović	23 – 19 November 1980	2.06 m (6 ft 9 in)	Seattle SuperSonics	(United States)
G	8	Igor Rakočević	26 – 29 March 1978	1.94 m (6 ft 4 in)	Crvena Zvezda	(Serbia and Montenegro)
G	9	Vlado Šćepanović	28 – 13 November 1975	1.96 m (6 ft 5 in)	Partizan	(Serbia and Montenegro)
G	10	Vule Avdalović	22 – 24 November 1981	1.94 m (6 ft 4 in)	Partizan	(Serbia and Montenegro)
C	11	Predrag Drobnjak	28 – 27 October 1975	2.07 m (6 ft 9 in)	Los Angeles Clippers	(United States)
C	12	Nenad Krstić	21 – 25 July 1983	2.14 m (7 ft 0 in)	New Jersey Nets	(United States)
G	13	Miloš Vujanić	23 – 13 November 1980	1.92 m (6 ft 4 in)	Skipper Bologna	(Italy)
C	14	Dejan Tomašević	31 – 6 May 1973	2.08 m (6 ft 10 in)	Pamesa Valencia	(Spain)
F	15	Aleksandar Pavlović	20 – 15 November 1983	2.01 m (6 ft 7 in)	Utah Jazz	(United States)

Head coach

- (Serbia and Montenegro) Željko Obradović

Assistant coach(es)

- (Serbia and Montenegro) Dragan Šakota

Legend

- (C) Team captain
- nat field describes country
  of last club
  before the tournament
- Age as of August 13, 2004

=== Spain ===
The following is the Spain roster in the men's basketball tournament of the 2004 Summer Olympics.

Spain men's national basketball team – 2004 Summer Olympics roster
Players
Coaches

Pos.	No.	Name	Age – Date of birth	Height	Club	Ctr.
F/C	4	Pau Gasol	24 – 6 July 1980	2.13 m (7 ft 0 in)	Memphis Grizzlies	(United States)
C	5	Iker Iturbe	28 – 10 July 1976	2.01 m (6 ft 7 in)	Adecco Estudiantes	(Spain)
G	6	Comas, Jaume	30 – 2 August 1974	1.86 m (6 ft 1 in)	Caprabo Lleida	(Spain)
G	7	Juan Carlos Navarro	24 – 13 June 1980	1.91 m (6 ft 3 in)	FC Barcelona	(Spain)
G	8	José Calderón	22 – 28 September 1981	1.90 m (6 ft 3 in)	TAU Cerámica	(Spain)
F/C	9	Felipe Reyes	24 – 16 March 1980	2.06 m (6 ft 9 in)	Adecco Estudiantes	(Spain)
F	10	Carlos Jiménez (C)	28 – 10 February 1976	2.04 m (6 ft 8 in)	Adecco Estudiantes	(Spain)
G	11	Óscar Yebra	30 – 15 July 1974	2.00 m (6 ft 7 in)	Forum Valladolid	(Spain)
C	12	Roberto Dueñas	28 – 1 November 1975	2.21 m (7 ft 3 in)	FC Barcelona	(Spain)
G	13	Rudy Fernandez	19 – 4 April 1985	1.96 m (6 ft 5 in)	Joventut Badalona	(Spain)
G	14	Rodrigo De la Fuente	27 – 28 November 1976	2.00 m (6 ft 7 in)	FC Barcelona	(Spain)
F/C	15	Jorge Garbajosa	26 – 19 December 1977	2.07 m (6 ft 9 in)	Benetton Treviso	(Italy)

Head coach

- (Spain) Mario Pesquera

Assistant coach(es)

- (Spain) Joan Creus
- (Spain) Manuel Genaro Díaz

Legend

- (C) Team captain
- nat field describes country
  of last club
  before the tournament
- Age as of August 13, 2004

== Group B ==
=== Angola ===
The following is the Angola roster in the men's basketball tournament of the 2004 Summer Olympics.

Angola men's national basketball team – 2004 Summer Olympics roster
Players
Coaches

Pos.	No.	Name	Age – Date of birth	Height	Club	Ctr.
F	4	Olimpio Cipriano	22 – 9 April 1982	1.92 m (6 ft 4 in)	Primeiro de Agosto	(Angola)
G	5	Walter Costa	31 – 25 March 1973	1.85 m (6 ft 1 in)	Primeiro de Agosto	(Angola)
F/C	6	Angelo Victoriano (C)	36 – 8 February 1968	1.96 m (6 ft 5 in)	Primeiro de Agosto	(Angola)
F	7	Gerson Monteiro	31 – 12 July 1973	1.90 m (6 ft 3 in)	Petróleos Luanda	(Angola)
F	8	Edmar Victoriano	28 – 10 November 1975	1.95 m (6 ft 5 in)	Primeiro de Agosto	(Angola)
F	9	Victor de Carvalho	35 – 20 February 1969	1.93 m (6 ft 4 in)	Petróleos Luanda	(Angola)
F/C	10	Joaquim Gomes	23 – 23 December 1980	2.00 m (6 ft 7 in)	Valparaiso Crusaders	(United States)
F/C	11	Victor Muzadi	26 – 22 June 1978	2.01 m (6 ft 7 in)	Primeiro de Agosto	(Angola)
C	12	Abdel Moussa	24 – 8 April 1980	2.02 m (6 ft 8 in)	Primeiro de Agosto	(Angola)
G/F	13	Carlos Almeida	27 – 24 September 1976	1.92 m (6 ft 4 in)	Primeiro de Agosto	(Angola)
G	14	Miguel Lutonda	32 – 24 December 1971	1.86 m (6 ft 1 in)	Primeiro de Agosto	(Angola)
F/C	15	Eduardo Mingas	25 – 29 January 1979	1.96 m (6 ft 5 in)	Interclube	(Angola)

Head coach

- (Portugal) Mário Palma

Assistant coach(es)

- (Angola) Raúl Duarte
- (Angola) Jaime Covilhã

Legend

- (C) Team captain
- nat field describes country
  of last club
  before the tournament
- Age as of August 13, 2004

=== Australia ===
The following is the Australia roster in the men's basketball tournament of the 2004 Summer Olympics.

Australia men's national basketball team – 2004 Summer Olympics roster
Players
Coaches

Pos.	No.	Name	Age – Date of birth	Height	Club	Ctr.
F	4	Tony Ronaldson	32 – 25 May 1972	2.03 m (6 ft 8 in)	Perth Wildcats	(Australia)
G	5	Brett Maher	31 – 17 April 1973	1.88 m (6 ft 2 in)	Adelaide 36ers	(Australia)
F	6	Andrew Bogut	19 – 28 November 1984	2.07 m (6 ft 9 in)	Utah Utes	(United States)
F	7	Martin Cattalini	30 – 4 October 1973	2.02 m (6 ft 8 in)	Adelaide 36ers	(Australia)
G	8	John Rillie	32 – 4 November 1971	1.95 m (6 ft 5 in)	West Sydney Razorbacks	(Australia)
G	9	C. J. Bruton	28 – 13 December 1975	1.88 m (6 ft 2 in)	Sydney Kings	(Australia)
G/F	10	Jason Smith	29 – 20 October 1974	1.94 m (6 ft 4 in)	Sydney Kings	(Australia)
G	11	Shane Heal (C)	33 – 6 September 1970	1.83 m (6 ft 0 in)	Sydney Kings	(Australia)
F	12	Glen Saville	28 – 17 January 1976	1.99 m (6 ft 6 in)	Wollongong Hawks	(Australia)
C	13	David Andersen	24 – 23 June 1980	2.12 m (6 ft 11 in)	Montepaschi Siena	(Italy)
F	14	Matthew Nielsen	26 – 3 February 1978	2.09 m (6 ft 10 in)	Sydney Kings	(Australia)
C	15	Paul Rogers	30 – 29 September 1973	2.08 m (6 ft 10 in)	Casademont Girona	(Spain)

Head coach

- (Australia) Brian Goorjian

Assistant coach(es)

- (Australia) Brendan Joyce
- (Canada) Ken Shields

Legend

- (C) Team captain
- nat field describes country
  of last club
  before the tournament
- Age as of August 13, 2004

=== Greece ===
The following is the Greece roster in the men's basketball tournament of the 2004 Summer Olympics.

Greece men's national basketball team – 2004 Summer Olympics roster
Players
Coaches

Pos.	No.	Name	Age – Date of birth	Height	Club	Ctr.
F	4	Fragiskos Alvertis (C)	30 – 11 June 1974	2.06 m (6 ft 9 in)	Panathinaikos	(Greece)
G	5	Theodoros Papaloukas	27 – 8 May 1977	2.00 m (6 ft 7 in)	CSKA Moscow	(Russia)
G	6	Nikolaos Zisis	20 – 16 August 1983	1.97 m (6 ft 6 in)	AEK Athens	(Greece)
F	7	Dimitris Papanikolaou	27 – 7 February 1977	2.02 m (6 ft 8 in)	Panathinaikos	(Greece)
G	8	Vassilis Spanoulis	22 – 7 August 1982	1.93 m (6 ft 4 in)	Maroussi	(Greece)
F	9	Antonis Fotsis	23 – 1 April 1981	2.09 m (6 ft 10 in)	Real Madrid	(Spain)
G	10	Nikolaos Chatzivrettas	27 – 26 May 1977	1.95 m (6 ft 5 in)	Panathinaikos	(Greece)
F/C	11	Dimosthenis Dikoudis	27 – 24 June 1977	2.08 m (6 ft 10 in)	CSKA Moscow	(Russia)
C	12	Konstantinos Tsartsaris	24 – 17 October 1979	2.09 m (6 ft 10 in)	Panathinaikos	(Greece)
G	13	Dimitris Diamantidis	24 – 6 May 1980	1.96 m (6 ft 5 in)	Iraklis Thessaloniki	(Greece)
C	14	Lazaros Papadopoulos	24 – 3 June 1980	2.13 m (7 ft 0 in)	Dynamo Moscow	(Russia)
F/C	15	Michail Kakiouzis	27 – 29 November 1976	2.07 m (6 ft 9 in)	Dynamo Moscow	(Russia)

Head coach

- (Greece) Panagiotis Giannakis

Assistant coach(es)

- (Greece) Eleftherios Kakiousis
- (Greece) Ioannis Sfairopoulos

Legend

- (C) Team captain
- nat field describes country
  of last club
  before the tournament
- Age as of August 13, 2004

=== Lithuania ===
The following is the Lithuania roster in the men's basketball tournament of the 2004 Summer Olympics.

Lithuania men's national basketball team – 2004 Summer Olympics roster
Players
Coaches

Pos.	No.	Name	Age – Date of birth	Height	Club	Ctr.
G	4	Vidas Ginevičius	26 – 11 May 1978	1.93 m (6 ft 4 in)	Žalgiris Kaunas	(Lithuania)
F	5	Mindaugas Žukauskas	28 – 24 August 1975	2.01 m (6 ft 7 in)	Montepaschi Siena	(Italy)
G	6	Arvydas Macijauskas	24 – 19 January 1980	1.92 m (6 ft 4 in)	TAU Cerámica	(Spain)
F	7	Saulius Štombergas (C)	30 – 14 December 1973	2.04 m (6 ft 8 in)	UNICS Kazan	(Russia)
G	8	Ramūnas Šiškauskas	25 – 10 September 1978	1.98 m (6 ft 6 in)	Lietuvos Rytas	(Lithuania)
F	9	Darius Songaila	26 – 14 February 1978	2.04 m (6 ft 8 in)	Sacramento Kings	(United States)
G	10	Donatas Slanina	27 – 23 April 1977	1.92 m (6 ft 4 in)	Caja San Fernando Sevilla	(Spain)
C	11	Eurelijus Žukauskas	30 – 22 August 1973	2.18 m (7 ft 2 in)	UNICS Kazan	(Russia)
F/C	12	Kšyštof Lavrinovič	24 – 1 November 1979	2.10 m (6 ft 11 in)	Ural Great Perm	(Russia)
G	13	Šarūnas Jasikevičius	28 – 5 March 1976	1.93 m (6 ft 4 in)	Maccabi Tel Aviv	(Israel)
G/F	14	Dainius Šalenga	27 – 15 April 1977	1.98 m (6 ft 6 in)	Žalgiris Kaunas	(Lithuania)
C	15	Robertas Javtokas	24 – 20 March 1980	2.10 m (6 ft 11 in)	Lietuvos Rytas	(Lithuania)

Head coach

- (Lithuania) Antanas Sireika

Assistant coach(es)

- (Lithuania) Valdemaras Chomičius
- (Lithuania) Gintaras Krapikas
- (United States) Donnie Nelson

Legend

- (C) Team captain
- nat field describes country
  of last club
  before the tournament
- Age as of August 13, 2004

=== Puerto Rico ===
The following is the Puerto Rico roster in the men's basketball tournament of the 2004 Summer Olympics.

Puerto Rico men's national basketball team – 2004 Summer Olympics roster
Players
Coaches

Pos.	No.	Name	Age – Date of birth	Height	Club	Ctr.
C	4	José Ortiz (C)	40 – 23 October 1963	2.11 m (6 ft 11 in)	Cangrejeros de Santurce	(Puerto Rico)
G/F	5	Eddie Casiano	31 – 20 September 1972	1.92 m (6 ft 4 in)	Leones de Ponce	(Puerto Rico)
G	6	Roberto Hatton	27 – 11 October 1976	1.88 m (6 ft 2 in)	Leones de Ponce	(Puerto Rico)
G	7	Carlos Arroyo	25 – 30 July 1979	1.85 m (6 ft 1 in)	Utah Jazz	(United States)
G/F	8	Rick Apodaca	24 – 1 July 1980	1.95 m (6 ft 5 in)	Huntsville Flight	(United States)
G	9	Christian Dalmau	28 – 29 August 1975	1.92 m (6 ft 4 in)	Atléticos de San Germán	(Puerto Rico)
G	10	Elias Ayuso	27 – 27 March 1977	1.92 m (6 ft 4 in)	Beşiktaş	(Turkey)
C	11	Peter John Ramos	19 – 23 May 1985	2.19 m (7 ft 2 in)	Criollos de Caguas	(Puerto Rico)
F	12	Rolando Hourruitiner	29 – 28 May 1975	2.04 m (6 ft 8 in)	Cangrejeros de Santurce	(Puerto Rico)
F	13	Sharif Fajardo	28 – 9 June 1976	2.10 m (6 ft 11 in)	Acegas Trieste	(Italy)
F	14	Jorge Rivera	30 – 9 December 1973	2.01 m (6 ft 7 in)	Vaqueros de Bayamón	(Puerto Rico)
C	15	Daniel Santiago	28 – 24 June 1976	2.13 m (7 ft 0 in)	Milwaukee Bucks	(United States)

Head coach

- (Puerto Rico) Julio Toro

Assistant coach(es)

- (Puerto Rico) Flor Meléndez
- (Puerto Rico) Manolo Cintron

Legend

- (C) Team captain
- nat field describes country
  of last club
  before the tournament
- Age as of August 13, 2004

=== United States ===
The following is the United States roster in the men's basketball tournament of the 2004 Summer Olympics.

United States men's national basketball team – 2004 Summer Olympics roster
Players
Coaches

Pos.	No.	Name	Age – Date of birth	Height	Club	Ctr.
G	4	Allen Iverson (C)	29 – 7 June 1975	1.82 m (6 ft 0 in)	Philadelphia 76ers	(United States)
G	5	Stephon Marbury	27 – 20 February 1977	1.87 m (6 ft 2 in)	New York Knicks	(United States)
G	6	Dwyane Wade	22 – 17 January 1982	1.93 m (6 ft 4 in)	Miami Heat	(United States)
F	7	Carlos Boozer	22 – 20 November 1981	2.05 m (6 ft 9 in)	Cleveland Cavaliers	(United States)
F	8	Carmelo Anthony	20 – 29 May 1984	2.03 m (6 ft 8 in)	Denver Nuggets	(United States)
F	9	LeBron James	19 – 30 December 1984	2.03 m (6 ft 8 in)	Cleveland Cavaliers	(United States)
C	10	Emeka Okafor	21 – 28 September 1982	2.07 m (6 ft 9 in)	UConn Huskies	(United States)
F	11	Shawn Marion	26 – 7 May 1978	2.00 m (6 ft 7 in)	Phoenix Suns	(United States)
C	12	Amar'e Stoudemire	21 – 16 November 1982	2.08 m (6 ft 10 in)	Phoenix Suns	(United States)
F	13	Tim Duncan (C)	28 – 25 April 1976	2.10 m (6 ft 11 in)	San Antonio Spurs	(United States)
F	14	Lamar Odom	24 – 6 November 1979	2.08 m (6 ft 10 in)	Miami Heat	(United States)
G	15	Richard Jefferson	24 – 21 June 1980	2.00 m (6 ft 7 in)	New Jersey Nets	(United States)

Head coach

- (United States) Larry Brown

Assistant coach(es)

- (United States) Gregg Popovich
- (United States) Roy Williams
- (United States) Oliver Purnell

Legend

- (C) Team captain
- nat field describes country
  of last club
  before the tournament
- Age as of August 13, 2004
