= Sava Lešić =

Serbian basketball player

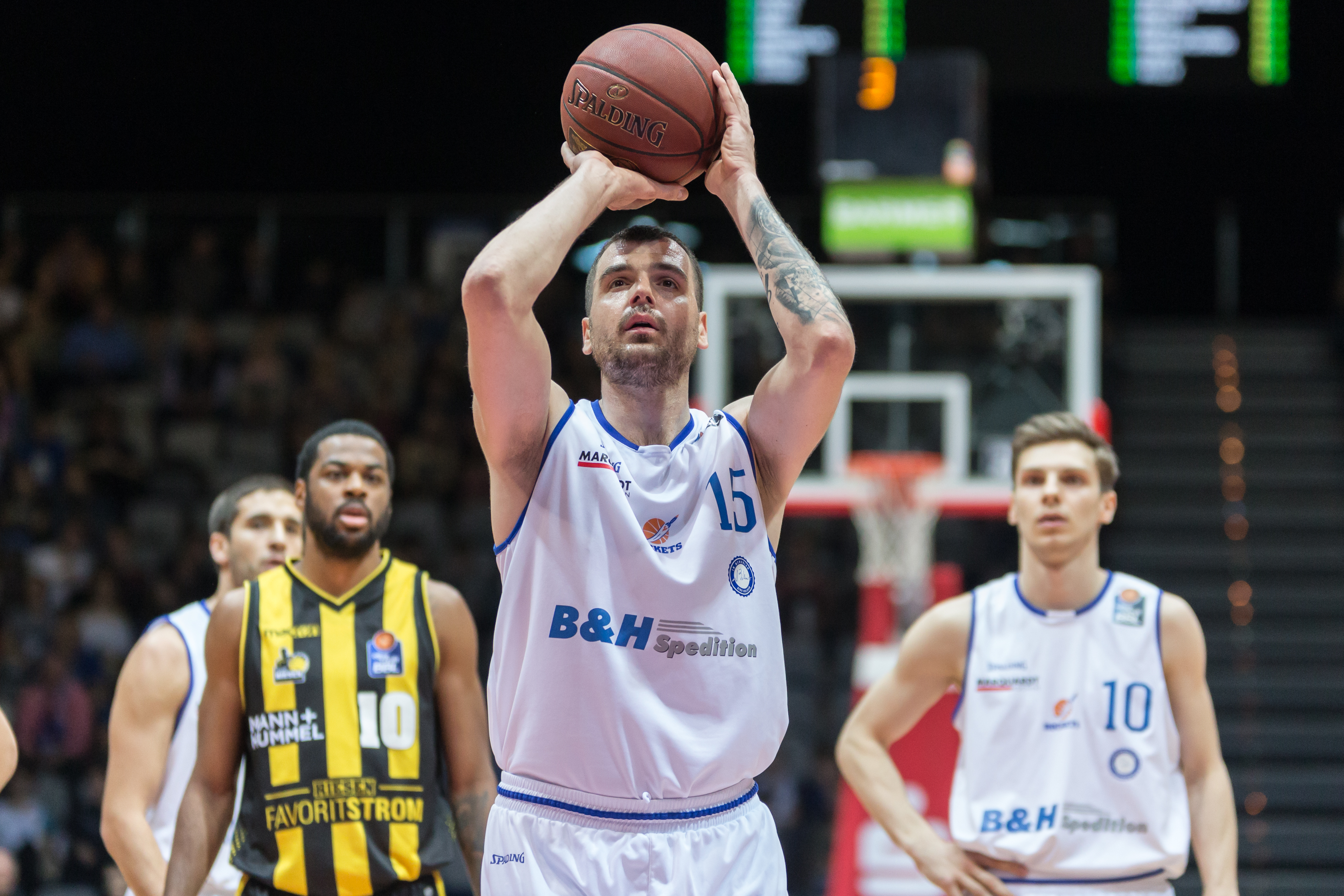
- Lešić in action with Rockets Gotha.

Personal information
- Born: February 23, 1988 (age 38) Knin, SR Croatia, SFR Yugoslavia
- Listed height: 6 ft 9 in (2.06 m)
- Listed weight: 223 lb (101 kg)

Career information
- NBA draft: 2010: undrafted
- Playing career: 2007–present
- Position: Power forward

Career history
- 2007–2008: Vizura
- 2008–2009: Superfund
- 2009–2010: Partizan
- 2010–2012: Crvena zvezda
- 2012–2013: Khimik
- 2013–2014: Radnički Kragujevac
- 2014–2015: Enisey
- 2015–2016: Union Olimpija
- 2016–2017: Reggiana
- 2017: Mega Leks
- 2017–2018: Rockets Gotha
- 2018–2020: Igokea
- 2020–2021: FMP
- 2021: Zob Ahan Isfahan
- 2021–2023: Borac Čačak
- 2023–2024: Metalac Valjevo
- 2024: Igokea
- 2024–2025: BKK Radnički

Career highlights
- Adriatic League champion (2010); Serbian League champion (2010); Serbian Cup winner (2010); Bosnian Cup winner (2019)
Medals
Men's basketball
Representing Serbia
Universiade
Gold medal – first place	2011 Shenzhen	Team competition

Sava Lešić (Serbian Cyrillic: Сава Лешић; born February 23, 1988) is a former Serbian professional basketball player.

== Professional career ==
Lešić played for youth systems of KK Požarevac, Superfund, and Partizan. His professional career started with Vizura. He then moved to Superfund where he averaged 16.4 points, 6.2 rebounds, and 1.1 assists over 25 games in the 2008–09 season. In 2009, he signed a four-year deal with the Serbian EuroLeague club Partizan.

In November 2010, Lešić terminated the contract with Partizan, and signed a four-year deal with Crvena zvezda. In August 2012, he signed with the Ukrainian team Khimik. In August 2013, he signed a one-year deal with Radnički Kragujevac.

In July 2014, he signed with the Russian team Yenisey Krasnoyarsk.

In August 2015, he signed with Slovenian club Union Olimpija for the 2015–16 season. With Olimpija he averaged 14.1 points in Eurocup and 15.2 points and 7.6 rebounds in ABA League.

On August 9, 2016, he signed with Italian club Pallacanestro Reggiana. On February 24, 2017, he parted ways with Reggiana. On April 4, 2017, he signed with Mega Leks for rest of the 2016–17 season.

On September 1, 2017, Lešić signed with German club Oettinger Rockets for the 2017–18 BBL season. On July 21, 2018, he signed for Bosnian club Igokea.

On September 11, 2020, Lešić signed with Serbian club FMP. In January 2021, FMP parted ways with him.

In February 2021, Lešić signed with Zob Ahan Isfahan of the Iranian Super League for the rest of the 2020–21 IBSL season. In September 2021, Lešić signed a one-year contract with Borac Čačak.

== National team career ==
Lešić was a member of the Serbian university team that won the gold medal at the 2011 Summer Universiade in Shenzhen, China.

Lešić appeared in 2 games for the Serbia team at the 2019 FIBA Basketball World Cup qualification.

== Personal life ==
Lešić was born in Knin, SR Croatia, SFR Yugoslavia (now Croatia), where he lived until 1995. Following the Operation Storm, he moved to Požarevac, FR Yugoslavia. He holds Croatian citizenship.

=== Strmica assault incident ===
On August 8, 2022, in Strmica, Lešić, his father, and brother were involved in a physical altercation with a 53-year-old Knin police officer and his 27-year-old son, the latter of whom got struck in the head with a hammer in process. A day later, Lešić told Sportal that the road rage incident was sparked by the older daughter calling him and his wife "Chetniks" and the younger daughter physically assaulting his wife. He also revealed that the police officer threatened to "kill them all" because "[Serbs] had killed his mother in 1995". Lešić acted in self defense after the officer's daughter began attacking his wife.
