= Vlado Šćepanović =

Montenegrin basketball player and coach

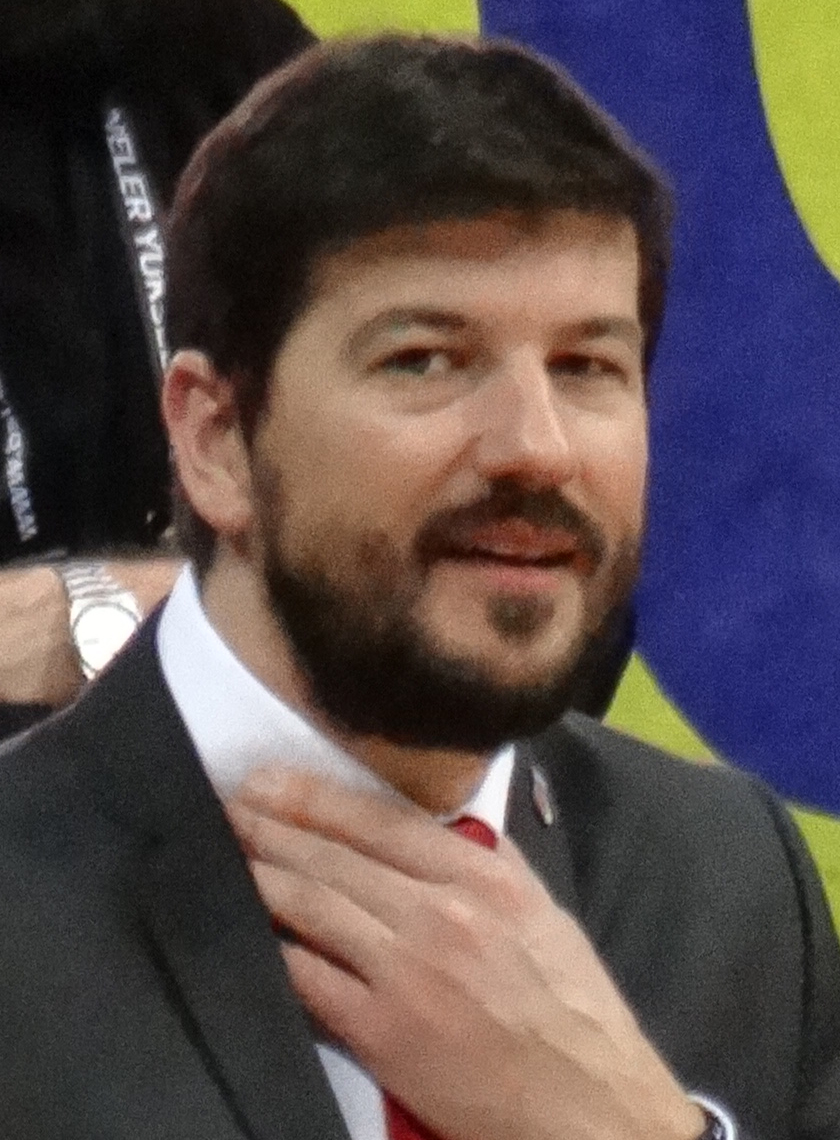
- Šćepanović in 2018

Personal information
- Born: 13 November 1975 (age 51) Kolašin, SR Montenegro, SFR Yugoslavia
- Listed height: 1.97 m (6 ft 5 1/2 in)
- Listed weight: 102 kg (225 lb)

Career information
- NBA draft: 1997: undrafted
- Playing career: 1993–2011
- Position: Shooting guard
- Number: 4, 7
- Coaching career: 2016–present

Career history

Playing
- 1993–2000: Budućnost
- 2000–2001: Efes Pilsen
- 2001–2002: Partizan
- 2002–2003: Skipper Bologna
- 2004: Partizan
- 2004–2006: Panathinaikos
- 2006–2007: PAOK
- 2007–2009: Granada
- 2009–2010: Murcia
- 2011: Panellinios

Coaching
- 2016: Budućnost
- 2017–2018: Brose Bamberg (assistant)
- 2018–2020: Partizan (assistant)
- 2020: Partizan

Career highlights
- As player: 4× YUBA League champion (1999, 2000, 2002, 2004); 3× Yugoslav Cup winner (1996, 1998, 2002); 2× Greek League champion (2005, 2006); 2× Greek Cup winner (2005, 2006); 3x YUBA All-Star (1999-2001); Turkish Cup winner (2001); As assistant coach: 2× Serbian Cup winner (2019, 2020)
Medals
Men's basketball
Representing Yugoslavia
World Cup
| Gold medal – first place | 1998 Greece |
EuroBasket
| Gold medal – first place | 2001 Turkey |
| Bronze medal – third place | 1999 France |
'22 & under' World Championship
| Bronze medal – third place | 1997 Australia | Under-21 |
Mediterranean Games
| Bronze medal – third place | 1997 Bari |
'22 & under' European Championship
| Bronze medal – third place | 1996 Turkey | Under-20 |

Vlado Šćepanović (born 13 November 1975) is a Montenegrin professional basketball coach and former player. At 1.97 m (6 ft 5 1/2 in), he played the shooting guard position.

== Professional career ==
Šćepanović began his professional career with Budućnost during the 1993–94 season. In 2000 he moved to Turkey and signed with Efes Pilsen. In the 2001–02 season, Šćepanović played with Partizan.

Šćepanović moved to Skipper Bologna in 2002, before returning to Partizan in 2004. He then spent three years in Greece, with Panathinaikos and PAOK, and three years in Spain, with Granada and Murcia.

In February 2011, Šćepanović signed with Panellinios until the end of the 2010–11 season.

== National team career ==
Playing with Serbia and Montenegro/FR Yugoslavia, Šćepanović won the gold medal at the 1998 FIBA World Championship, the bronze medal at the 1999 EuroBasket and gold again at the 2001 EuroBasket. He also took part in the 2000 and 2004 Summer Olympics, as well as at the 2005 EuroBasket.

After Montenegro gained independence, he represented their senior national team at the 2011 EuroBasket.

== Coaching career ==
On 24 June 2016, Šćepanović was named the head coach of Budućnost. On 13 November 2016, he resigned from the position of Budućnost head coach.

On 9 July 2020, Šćepanović was named the head coach for Partizan of the ABA League and the Basketball League of Serbia after serving two years as an assistant coach in their staff. He parted ways with the team on 30 October.

== See also ==
- List of KK Partizan head coaches
- List of Serbia and Montenegro men's national basketball team players
