= EuroBasket 1995 squads =

The following is the list of squads for each of the 14 teams competing in the EuroBasket 1995, held in Greece between 21 June and 2 July 1995. Each team selected a squad of 12 players for the tournament.

== Group A ==
=== Germany ===
Germany men's national basketball team roster
Players
Coaches

Pos.	No.	Name	Age – Date of birth	Height	Club
G	4	Ingo Freyer	24 – 7 February 1971	1.96 m (6 ft 5 in)	Alba Berlin	(Germany)
G	5	Henrik Rödl	26 – 4 March 1969	2.00 m (6 ft 7 in)	Alba Berlin	(Germany)
PG	6	Michael Koch	29 – 13 January 1966	1.90 m (6 ft 3 in)	Bayer Giants Leverkusen	(Germany)
C	7	Detlef Musch	25 – 28 March 1970	2.12 m (6 ft 11 in)	Bayer Giants Leverkusen	(Germany)
G	8	Denis Wucherer	22 – 7 May 1973	1.95 m (6 ft 5 in)	Bayer Giants Leverkusen	(Germany)
C	9	Chris Welp	31 – 2 January 1964	2.13 m (7 ft 0 in)	Bayer Giants Leverkusen	(Germany)
C	10	Teoman Öztürk	27 – 5 December 1967	2.08 m (6 ft 10 in)	Alba Berlin	(Germany)
F	11	Patrick King	24 – 2 November 1970
PF	12	Hansi Gnad	32 – 4 June 1963	2.08 m (6 ft 10 in)	Brandt Hagen	(Germany)
PG	13	Kai Nürnberger	29 – 2 June 1966	1.83 m (6 ft 0 in)	TTL Bamberg	(Germany)
PF	14	Ademola Okulaja	19 – 10 July 1975	2.06 m (6 ft 9 in)	University of North Carolina at Chapel Hill	(United States)
F	15	Michael Knörr	28 – 20 September 1966

Head coach

- Vladislav Lučić

Legend

- Club – describes last
  club before the tournament
- Age – describes age
  on 21 June 1995

=== Greece ===
Greece men's national basketball team roster
Players
Coaches

Pos.	No.	Name	Age – Date of birth	Height	Club
G	4	Efthimis Bakatsias	27 – 14 January 1968	1.96 m (6 ft 5 in)	Olympiacos	(Greece)
G	5	Kostas Patavoukas	29 – 3 February 1966	1.91 m (6 ft 3 in)	Panathinaikos	(Greece)
PG	6	Panagiotis Giannakis	36 – 1 January 1959	1.92 m (6 ft 4 in)	Panathinaikos	(Greece)
F	7	Tzanis Stavrakopoulos	23 – 30 October 1971	2.02 m (6 ft 8 in)	Ampelokipon	(Greece)
G	8	Giorgos Sigalas	24 – 31 July 1970	2.01 m (6 ft 7 in)	Olympiacos	(Greece)
PG	9	Lefteris Kakiousis	27 – 7 June 1968	1.89 m (6 ft 2 in)	Iraklis Thessaloniki	(Greece)
F	10	Fragiskos Alvertis	21 – 11 June 1974	2.06 m (6 ft 9 in)	Panathinaikos	(Greece)
PF	11	Nikos Oikonomou	22 – 19 February 1973	2.08 m (6 ft 10 in)	Panathinaikos	(Greece)
PF	12	Dinos Angelidis	26 – 5 April 1969	2.08 m (6 ft 10 in)	Aris	(Greece)
C	13	Panagiotis Fasoulas	32 – 12 May 1963	2.13 m (7 ft 0 in)	Olympiacos	(Greece)
C	14	Efthimios Rentzias	19 – 11 January 1976	2.12 m (6 ft 11 in)	P.A.O.K.	(Greece)
F	15	Fanis Christodoulou	30 – 22 May 1965	2.03 m (6 ft 8 in)	Panionios	(Greece)

Head coach

- Makis Dendrinos

Legend

- Club – describes last
  club before the tournament
- Age – describes age
  on 21 June 1995

=== Israel ===
Israel men's national basketball team roster
Players
Coaches

Pos.	No.	Name	Age – Date of birth	Height	Club
F	4	Nadav Henefeld	27 – 19 June 1968	2.02 m (6 ft 8 in)	Maccabi Tel Aviv B.C.	(Israel)
C	5	Ofer Fleisher	29 – 14 March 1966	2.08 m (6 ft 10 in)	Hapoel Tel Aviv B.C.	(Israel)
PG	6	Guy Goodes	24 – 13 March 1971	1.90 m (6 ft 3 in)	Maccabi Tel Aviv B.C.	(Israel)
G	7	Brad Leaf	35 – 17 May 1960	1.95 m (6 ft 5 in)	Hapoel Galil Elyon	(Israel)
PF	8	Dror Cohen	21 – 17 January 1974	2.02 m (6 ft 8 in)	Maccabi Jerusalem B.C.	(Israel)
PG	9	Adi Gordon	29 – 4 March 1966	1.80 m (5 ft 11 in)	Hapoel Holon	(Israel)
C	10	Amir Muchtari	23 – 12 June 1972	2.08 m (6 ft 10 in)	Hapoel Galil Elyon	(Israel)
G	11	Doron Sheffer	23 – 12 March 1972	1.95 m (6 ft 5 in)	University of Connecticut	(United States)
F	12	Doron Jamchi	33 – 1 July 1961	1.98 m (6 ft 6 in)	Maccabi Tel Aviv B.C.	(Israel)
PF	13	Kobi Balul	22 – 5 February 1973	2.03 m (6 ft 8 in)	Maccabi Rishon LeZion	(Israel)
G	14	Lior Arditti	27 – 16 December 1967	1.92 m (6 ft 4 in)	Hapoel Tel Aviv B.C.	(Israel)
F	15	Moti Daniel	31 – 24 July 1963	1.98 m (6 ft 6 in)	Maccabi Tel Aviv B.C.	(Israel)

Head coach

- Zvi Sherf

Legend

- Club – describes last
  club before the tournament
- Age – describes age
  on 21 June 1995

=== Italy ===
Italy men's national basketball team roster
Players
Coaches

Pos.	No.	Name	Age – Date of birth	Height	Club
PG	4	Claudio Coldebella	26 – 25 June 1968	1.98 m (6 ft 6 in)	Virtus Bologna	(Italy)
PG	5	Ferdinando Gentile	28 – 1 January 1967	1.90 m (6 ft 3 in)	Olimpia Milano	(Italy)
C	6	Walter Magnifico	34 – 18 June 1961	2.09 m (6 ft 10 in)	Victoria Libertas Pesaro	(Italy)
F	7	Riccardo Pittis	26 – 18 December 1968	2.03 m (6 ft 8 in)	Benetton Treviso	(Italy)
G	8	Vincenzo Esposito	26 – 1 March 1969	1.94 m (6 ft 4 in)	Fortitudo Bologna	(Italy)
PF	9	Paolo Conti	25 – 9 November 1969	2.08 m (6 ft 10 in)	Pallacanestro Varese	(Italy)
G	10	Alessandro Abbio	24 – 13 March 1971	1.93 m (6 ft 4 in)	Virtus Bologna	(Italy)
PF	11	Gregor Fučka	23 – 7 August 1971	2.15 m (7 ft 1 in)	Olimpia Milano	(Italy)
G	12	Federico Pieri	25 – 16 June 1970	1.92 m (6 ft 4 in)	Victoria Libertas Pesaro	(Italy)
C	13	Alessandro Frosini	22 – 22 September 1972	2.09 m (6 ft 10 in)	Fortitudo Bologna	(Italy)
C	14	Flavio Carera	32 – 18 January 1963	2.06 m (6 ft 9 in)	Virtus Bologna	(Italy)
C	15	Stefano Rusconi	26 – 2 October 1968	2.08 m (6 ft 10 in)	Benetton Treviso	(Italy)

Head coach

- Ettore Messina

Legend

- Club – describes last
  club before the tournament
- Age – describes age
  on 21 June 1995

=== Lithuania ===
Lithuania men's national basketball team roster
Players
Coaches

Pos.	No.	Name	Age – Date of birth	Height	Club
G	4	Valdemaras Chomičius	36 – 4 May 1959	1.92 m (6 ft 4 in)	CB Marbella	(Spain)
PF	5	Mindaugas Timinskas	21 – 28 March 1974	2.01 m (6 ft 7 in)	Iona College	(United States)
F	6	Saulius Štombergas	21 – 14 December 1973	2.04 m (6 ft 8 in)	Atletas Kaunas	(Lithuania)
F	7	Arūnas Visockas	29 – 7 December 1965	1.99 m (6 ft 6 in)	BC Žalgiris	(Lithuania)
G	8	Darius Lukminas	27 – 9 February 1968	1.95 m (6 ft 5 in)	BC Žalgiris	(Lithuania)
F	9	Gintaras Krapikas	33 – 6 July 1961	1.96 m (6 ft 5 in)
F	10	Rimas Kurtinaitis	35 – 15 May 1960	1.96 m (6 ft 5 in)	Real Madrid	(Spain)
C	11	Arvydas Sabonis	30 – 19 December 1964	2.21 m (7 ft 3 in)	Real Madrid	(Spain)
PF	12	Artūras Karnišovas	24 – 27 April 1971	2.04 m (6 ft 8 in)	Cholet Basket	(France)
G	13	Šarūnas Marčiulionis	31 – 13 June 1964	1.96 m (6 ft 5 in)	Seattle SuperSonics	(United States)
PF	14	Gintaras Einikis	25 – 30 September 1969	2.08 m (6 ft 10 in)	BC Žalgiris	(Lithuania)
PG	15	Gvidonas Markevičius	25 – 22 November 1969	1.96 m (6 ft 5 in)	Basket Zielona Góra	(Poland)

Head coach

- Vladas Garastas

Legend

- Club – describes last
  club before the tournament
- Age – describes age
  on 21 June 1995

=== Sweden ===
Sweden men's national basketball team roster
Players
Coaches

Pos.	No.	Name	Age – Date of birth	Height	Club
PG	4	Olle Håkanson	22 – 14 August 1972
PG	5	Örjan Andersson	29 – 24 June 1965
G	6	Christian Larsson	24 – 13 September 1970
F	7	Henrik Evers	31 – 10 January 1964
G	8	Henrik Gaddefors	30 – 6 April 1965
G	9	Jonas Larsson	24 – 2 May 1971	1.94 m (6 ft 4 in)	Borås Basket	(Sweden)
F	10	Oscar Lefwerth	28 – 16 May 1967
PF	11	Joakim Blom	19 – 16 March 1976	2.11 m (6 ft 11 in)	Södertälje BBK	(Sweden)
PF	12	Torbjörn Gehrke	27 – 27 July 1967	2.03 m (6 ft 8 in)
C	13	Anders Marcus	28 – 31 October 1966
PF	14	Vincent Lundahl	24 – 29 April 1971	2.10 m (6 ft 11 in)
C	15	Mattias Sahlström	27 – 12 February 1968

Head coach

- Rolf Nilsson

Legend

- Club – describes last
  club before the tournament
- Age – describes age
  on 21 June 1995

=== FR Yugoslavia ===
FR Yugoslavia men's national basketball team roster
Players
Coaches

Pos.	No.	Name	Age – Date of birth	Height	Club
F	4	Dejan Bodiroga	22 – 2 March 1973	2.05 m (6 ft 9 in)	Olimpia Milano	(Italy)
G	5	Predrag Danilović	25 – 26 February 1970	2.01 m (6 ft 7 in)	Virtus Bologna	(Italy)
PG	6	Saša Obradović	26 – 29 January 1969	1.97 m (6 ft 6 in)	Alba Berlin	(Germany)
PG	7	Zoran Sretenović	30 – 5 August 1964	1.91 m (6 ft 3 in)	KK Borovica	(Federal Republic of Yugoslavia)
F	8	Žarko Paspalj	29 – 27 March 1966	2.08 m (6 ft 10 in)	Panathinaikos	(Greece)
G	9	Miroslav Berić	22 – 20 January 1973	2.00 m (6 ft 7 in)	KK Partizan	(Federal Republic of Yugoslavia)
PG	10	Aleksandar Đorđević	27 – 26 August 1967	1.88 m (6 ft 2 in)	Fortitudo Bologna	(Italy)
C	11	Željko Rebrača	23 – 9 April 1972	2.13 m (7 ft 0 in)	Benetton Treviso	(Italy)
C	12	Vlade Divac	27 – 3 February 1968	2.16 m (7 ft 1 in)	Los Angeles Lakers	(United States)
C	13	Zoran Savić	28 – 18 November 1966	2.06 m (6 ft 9 in)	P.A.O.K.	(Greece)
PF	14	Dejan Tomašević	22 – 6 May 1973	2.08 m (6 ft 10 in)	KK Partizan	(Federal Republic of Yugoslavia)
C	15	Dejan Koturović	23 – 31 March 1972	2.13 m (7 ft 0 in)	KK Spartak Subotica	(Federal Republic of Yugoslavia)

Head coach

- Dušan Ivković

Assistant coach(es)

- Željko Obradović
- Milan Minić

Legend

- Club – describes last
  club before the tournament
- Age – describes age
  on 21 June 1995

== Group B ==
=== Croatia ===
Croatia men's national basketball team roster
Players
Coaches

Pos.	No.	Name	Age – Date of birth	Height	Club
G	4	Josip Vranković	26 – 26 October 1968	1.98 m (6 ft 6 in)	KK Split	(Croatia)
G	5	Velimir Perasović	30 – 9 February 1965	1.95 m (6 ft 5 in)	Saski Baskonia	(Spain)
F	6	Arijan Komazec	25 – 23 January 1970	2.01 m (6 ft 7 in)	Pallacanestro Varese	(Italy)
F	7	Toni Kukoč	26 – 18 September 1968	2.11 m (6 ft 11 in)	Chicago Bulls	(United States)
PG	8	Vladan Alanović	27 – 3 July 1967	1.94 m (6 ft 4 in)	KK Cibona	(Croatia)
PG	9	Ivica Marić	28 – 16 April 1967	1.82 m (6 ft 0 in)	KK Zrinjevac	(Croatia)
PF	10	Ivica Žurić	30 – 9 January 1965	2.06 m (6 ft 9 in)	KK Cibona	(Croatia)
C	11	Stojko Vranković	31 – 22 January 1964	2.18 m (7 ft 2 in)	Panathinaikos	(Greece)
PG	12	Alan Gregov	25 – 1 April 1970	1.91 m (6 ft 3 in)	KK Cibona	(Croatia)
G	13	Veljko Mršić	24 – 13 April 1971	2.03 m (6 ft 8 in)	KK Cibona	(Croatia)
C	14	Dino Rađa	28 – 24 April 1967	2.12 m (6 ft 11 in)	Boston Celtics	(United States)
C	15	Davor Pejčinović	24 – 28 March 1971	2.11 m (6 ft 11 in)	KK Cibona	(Croatia)

Head coach

- Aco Petrović

Legend

- Club – describes last
  club before the tournament
- Age – describes age
  on 21 June 1995

=== Finland ===
Finland men's national basketball team roster
Players
Coaches

Pos.	No.	Name	Age – Date of birth	Height	Club
PF	4	Martti Kuisma	24 – 24 July 1970	2.08 m (6 ft 10 in)	NMKY Helsinki	(Finland)
C	5	Hanno Möttölä	18 – 9 September 1976	2.11 m (6 ft 11 in)	NMKY Helsinki	(Finland)
C	6	Pekka Markkanen	28 – 28 May 1967	2.07 m (6 ft 9 in)	Zalakeramia-ZTE KK	(Hungary)
F	7	Sakari Pehkonen	29 – 30 April 1966	2.01 m (6 ft 7 in)	Espoon Honka	(Finland)
F	8	Jarkko Tuomala	33 – 12 October 1961	2.00 m (6 ft 7 in)	KTP-Basket	(Finland)
F	9	Markku Larkio	22 – 4 September 1972	2.03 m (6 ft 8 in)	Namika Lahti	(Finland)
F	10	Riku Marttinen	28 – 26 June 1966		Torpan Pojat	(Finland)
G	11	Mika-Matti Tahvanainen	24 – 1 September 1970		Pantterit	(Finland)
G	12	Juha Luhtanen	25 – 12 December 1969	1.93 m (6 ft 4 in)	Espoon Honka	(Finland)
PG	13	Jyri Lehtonen	21 – 22 December 1973	1.93 m (6 ft 4 in)	Hongikon Nuorisoseuran Urheilijat	(Finland)
PG	14	Kari-Pekka Klinga	32 – 30 March 1963		Torpan Pojat	(Finland)
PG	15	Petri-Mikael Niiranen	29 – 9 February 1966		NMKY Helsinki	(Finland)

Head coach

- Henrik Dettmann

Legend

- Club – describes last
  club before the tournament
- Age – describes age
  on 21 June 1995

=== France ===
France men's national basketball team roster
Players
Coaches

Pos.	No.	Name	Age – Date of birth	Height	Club
PG	4	Frédéric Forte	25 – 27 January 1970	1.92 m (6 ft 4 in)	Limoges CSP	(France)
PG	5	Moustapha Sonko	23 – 14 June 1972	1.92 m (6 ft 4 in)	Levallois Sporting Club Basket	(France)
G	6	Antoine Rigaudeau	23 – 17 December 1971	2.00 m (6 ft 7 in)	Cholet Basket	(France)
PG	7	Bruno Hamm	24 – 22 September 1970	1.88 m (6 ft 2 in)	Pau-Orthez	(France)
F	8	Yann Bonato	23 – 4 March 1972	2.01 m (6 ft 7 in)	Paris Basket Racing	(France)
C	9	Stéphane Ostrowski	33 – 17 March 1962	2.05 m (6 ft 9 in)	Olympique Antibes	(France)
F	10	Hugues Occansey	28 – 18 December 1966	2.00 m (6 ft 7 in)	ASVEL Basket	(France)
PF	11	Thierry Gadou	26 – 13 January 1969	2.05 m (6 ft 9 in)	Pau-Orthez	(France)
F	12	Didier Gadou	29 – 28 September 1965	2.03 m (6 ft 8 in)	Pau-Orthez	(France)
C	13	Franck Butter	31 – 14 September 1963	2.10 m (6 ft 11 in)	Montpellier Basket	(France)
PF	14	Jim Bilba	27 – 13 April 1968	1.98 m (6 ft 6 in)	Limoges CSP	(France)
C	15	Frédéric Domon	32 – 5 July 1962	2.03 m (6 ft 8 in)	Olympique Antibes	(France)

Head coach

- Michel Gomez

Legend

- Club – describes last
  club before the tournament
- Age – describes age
  on 21 June 1995

=== Russia ===
Russia men's national basketball team roster
Players
Coaches

Pos.	No.	Name	Age – Date of birth	Height	Club
PG	4	Vasily Karasev	24 – 14 April 1971	1.93 m (6 ft 4 in)	PBC CSKA Moscow	(Russia)
G	5	Igor Kudelin	22 – 10 August 1972	1.95 m (6 ft 5 in)	PBC CSKA Moscow	(Russia)
G	6	Dmitri Domani	20 – 27 September 1974	2.00 m (6 ft 7 in)	Saint Joseph's University	(United States)
PF	7	Evgeni Kisurin	26 – 28 January 1969	2.07 m (6 ft 9 in)	PBC CSKA Moscow	(Russia)
PG	8	Evgeniy Pashutin	26 – 2 June 1969	1.88 m (6 ft 2 in)	BC Dynamo Moscow	(Russia)
PG	9	Sergei Bazarevich	30 – 16 March 1965	1.91 m (6 ft 3 in)	Cáceres CB	(Spain)
G	10	Sergei Babkov	28 – 5 June 1967	1.92 m (6 ft 4 in)	CB Málaga	(Spain)
C	11	Mikhail Mikhaylov	24 – 17 May 1971	2.06 m (6 ft 9 in)	Real Madrid	(Spain)
PF	12	Andrei Fetisov	22 – 19 January 1973	2.08 m (6 ft 10 in)	CB Valladolid	(Spain)
PF	13	Sergei Ivanov	31 – 9 July 1963	2.05 m (6 ft 9 in)	BC Dynamo Moscow	(Russia)
F	14	Sergei Panov	24 – 30 June 1970	2.05 m (6 ft 9 in)	PBC CSKA Moscow	(Russia)
C	15	Vitaliy Nosov	27 – 1 February 1968	2.12 m (6 ft 11 in)	KK Union Olimpija	(Slovenia)

Head coach

- Sergei Belov

Legend

- Club – describes last
  club before the tournament
- Age – describes age
  on 21 June 1995

=== Slovenia ===
Slovenia men's national basketball team roster
Players
Coaches

Pos.	No.	Name	Age – Date of birth	Height	Club	Ctr.
G	4	Roman Horvat	23 – 21 November 1971	2.00 m (6 ft 7 in)	KK Union Olimpija	(Slovenia)
F	5	Matjaž Tovornik	35 – 3 January 1960	2.02 m (6 ft 8 in)	KK Zlatorog Laško	(Slovenia)
PG	6	Jaka Daneu	24 – 3 February 1971	1.94 m (6 ft 4 in)	KK Union Olimpija	(Slovenia)
PG	7	Walter Jeklin	25 – 27 September 1969	1.87 m (6 ft 2 in)	KK Union Olimpija	(Slovenia)
C	8	Marijan Kraljević	25 – 30 April 1970	2.12 m (6 ft 11 in)	KK Union Olimpija	(Slovenia)
PG	9	Jure Zdovc	28 – 13 December 1966	1.98 m (6 ft 6 in)	Iraklis Thessaloniki	(Greece)
PF	10	Marko Tušek	19 – 17 July 1975	2.04 m (6 ft 8 in)	KK Triglav Kranj	(Slovenia)
PF	11	Teoman Alibegović	28 – 11 January 1967	2.08 m (6 ft 10 in)	Alba Berlin	(Germany)
F	12	Marko Milič	18 – 7 May 1977	1.99 m (6 ft 6 in)	KK Union Olimpija	(Slovenia)
F	13	Boris Gorenc	21 – 3 December 1973	1.98 m (6 ft 6 in)	KK Union Olimpija	(Slovenia)
C	14	Slavko Kotnik	32 – 3 November 1962	2.06 m (6 ft 9 in)	Bàsquet Manresa	(Spain)
C	15	Aleš Kunc	21 – 13 July 1973	2.08 m (6 ft 10 in)	KD Slovan	(Slovenia)

Head coach

- Zmago Sagadin

Legend

- Club – describes last
  club before the tournament
- Age – describes age
  on 21 June 1995

=== Spain ===
Spain men's national basketball team roster
Players
Coaches

Pos.	No.	Name	Age – Date of birth	Height	Club
G	4	Alberto Angulo	25 – 12 June 1970	1.96 m (6 ft 5 in)	CB Zaragoza	(Spain)
PG	5	José Luis Galilea	22 – 9 July 1972	1.87 m (6 ft 2 in)	FC Barcelona	(Spain)
F	6	Mike Smith	31 – 10 September 1963	1.98 m (6 ft 6 in)	Joventut Badalona	(Spain)
C	7	Juan Antonio Orenga	28 – 29 July 1966	2.06 m (6 ft 9 in)	CB Estudiantes	(Spain)
PG	8	Ignacio Rodríguez	24 – 2 September 1970	1.86 m (6 ft 1 in)	CB Málaga	(Spain)
PG	9	Pablo Laso	27 – 13 October 1967	1.78 m (5 ft 10 in)	Real Madrid	(Spain)
F	10	Xavi Fernández	27 – 12 February 1968	1.94 m (6 ft 4 in)	FC Barcelona	(Spain)
F	11	Alberto Herreros	26 – 20 April 1969	2.00 m (6 ft 7 in)	CB Estudiantes	(Spain)
C	12	Alfonso Reyes	23 – 19 September 1971	2.02 m (6 ft 8 in)	CB Málaga	(Spain)
C	13	Ferran Martínez	27 – 25 April 1968	2.12 m (6 ft 11 in)	FC Barcelona	(Spain)
C	14	Antonio Martín Espina	29 – 18 June 1966	2.10 m (6 ft 11 in)	Real Madrid	(Spain)
PF	15	Fran Murcia	24 – 14 November 1970	2.03 m (6 ft 8 in)	CB Zaragoza	(Spain)

Head coach

- Lolo Sainz

Legend

- Club – describes last
  club before the tournament
- Age – describes age
  on 21 June 1995

=== Turkey ===
Turkey men's national basketball team roster
Players
Coaches

Pos.	No.	Name	Age – Date of birth	Height	Club
PF	4	Murat Konuk	23 – 18 February 1972	2.03 m (6 ft 8 in)	Tofaş S.K.	(Turkey)
PF	5	Mirsad Türkcan	19 – 7 June 1976	2.06 m (6 ft 9 in)	Efes Pilsen	(Turkey)
PG	6	Murat Evliyaoğlu	26 – 2 June 1969	1.94 m (6 ft 4 in)	Türk Telekom B.K.	(Turkey)
PG	7	Orhun Ene	28 – 1 February 1967	1.88 m (6 ft 2 in)	Ülkerspor	(Turkey)
G	8	İbrahim Kutluay	21 – 7 January 1974	1.97 m (6 ft 6 in)	Fenerbahçe	(Turkey)
G	9	Harun Erdenay	27 – 27 May 1968	1.98 m (6 ft 6 in)	Ülkerspor	(Turkey)
G	10	Serdar Apaydın	28 – 21 October 1966	1.95 m (6 ft 5 in)	Ülkerspor	(Turkey)
PG	11	Levent Topsakal	29 – 9 June 1966	1.90 m (6 ft 3 in)	Galatasaray S.K.	(Turkey)
C	12	Ömer Büyükaycan	29 – 10 May 1966	2.08 m (6 ft 10 in)	Galatasaray S.K.	(Turkey)
C	13	Tamer Oyguç	29 – 11 January 1966	2.10 m (6 ft 11 in)	Efes Pilsen	(Turkey)
G	14	Lütfi Arıboğan	33 – 30 September 1961	1.98 m (6 ft 6 in)	Galatasaray S.K.	(Turkey)
F	15	Haluk Yıldırım	22 – 25 June 1972	2.01 m (6 ft 7 in)	Ülkerspor	(Turkey)

Head coach

- Çetin Yılmaz

Legend

- Club – describes last
  club before the tournament
- Age – describes age
  on 21 June 1995
