= 2015 Serbia men's EuroBasket team =

The 2015 Serbia men's EuroBasket team represented Serbia and took the fourth place at the EuroBasket 2015, held in four countries (Croatia, France, Germany, and Latvia). They were qualified for the EuroBasket by taking the 4th place at the EuroBasket 2013. The team was coached by Aleksandar Đorđević, with assistant coaches Miroslav Nikolić, Milan Minić, Jovica Antonić, and Goran Bjedov.

== Timeline ==
- May 26: 24-man roster announced
- June 24: 18-man roster announced
- July 15: Start of a training camp
- August 2–29: Exhibition games
- September 5–20: EuroBasket 2013

== Roster ==
The following is the Serbia roster for the EuroBasket 2015

Serbian men's basketball national team roster
Players
Coaches

Pos.	No.	Name	Age – Date of birth	Height	Club	Ctr.
PG	4	Miloš Teodosić (C)	28 – March 19, 1987	1.95 m (6 ft 5 in)	CSKA Moscow	(Russia)
SF	5	Marko Simonović	29 – May 30, 1986	2.01 m (6 ft 7 in)	Pau-Orthez	(France)
C	6	Ognjen Kuzmić	25 – May 16, 1990	2.13 m (7 ft 0 in)	Golden State Warriors	(United States)
SG	7	Bogdan Bogdanović	23 – August 18, 1992	1.98 m (6 ft 6 in)	Fenerbahce	(Turkey)
F	8	Nemanja Bjelica	27 – May 9, 1988	2.09 m (6 ft 10 in)	Fenerbahce	(Turkey)
PG	9	Stefan Marković	27 – April 25, 1988	1.95 m (6 ft 5 in)	Baloncesto Málaga	(Spain)
SF	10	Nikola Kalinić	23 – November 8, 1991	2.02 m (6 ft 8 in)	Crvena zvezda	(Serbia)
G	11	Nemanja Nedović	24 – June 16, 1991	1.92 m (6 ft 4 in)	Valencia	(Spain)
G/F	12	Dragan Milosavljević	26 – May 11, 1989	1.98 m (6 ft 6 in)	Partizan NIS	(Serbia)
C	13	Miroslav Raduljica	27 – January 5, 1988	2.13 m (7 ft 0 in)	Panathinaikos	(Greece)
PF	14	Zoran Erceg	30 – January 11, 1985	2.11 m (6 ft 11 in)	Galatasaray	(Turkey)
C	15	Nikola Milutinov	20 – December 30, 1994	2.12 m (6 ft 11 in)	Partizan NIS	(Serbia)

Head coach

- (Serbia) Aleksandar Đorđević

Assistant coach(es)

- (Serbia) Miroslav Nikolić
- (Serbia) Jovica Antonić
- (Serbia) Milan Minić
- (Croatia) Goran Bjedov

Legend

- Club – describes last
  club before the tournament
- Age – describes age
  on 5 September 2015

The following were candidates to make the team:

Earlier candidates
Player	Team (Note: Team at the time player was a candidate)	Added	Removed	Reason
Rade Zagorac	(Serbia) Mega Leks	May 26, 2015	June 24, 2015	18-man roster cut
Vasilije Micić	(Germany) Bayern Munich	May 26, 2015	June 24, 2015	18-man roster cut
Stefan Birčević	(Spain) Estudiantes	May 26, 2015	June 24, 2015	18-man roster cut
Milan Mačvan	(Serbia) Partizan NIS	May 26, 2015	June 24, 2015	18-man roster cut
Nikola Jokić	(Serbia) Mega Leks	May 26, 2015	June 24, 2015	18-man roster cut
Đorđe Majstorović	(Serbia) Metalac Farmakom	May 26, 2015	June 24, 2015	18-man roster cut
Stefan Jović	(Serbia) Crvena zvezda	May 26, 2015	July 18, 2015	Injured
Boban Marjanović	(Serbia) Crvena zvezda	May 26, 2015	August 4, 2015	Withdrew
Stefan Pot	(Romania) CSU Asesoft Ploiești	May 26, 2015	August 16, 2015	16-man roster cut
Luka Mitrović	(Serbia) Crvena zvezda	May 26, 2015		
Vladimir Štimac	(Spain) Estudiantes	May 26, 2015	September 1, 2015	12-man roster cut
Nemanja Dangubić	(Serbia) Crvena zvezda	May 26, 2015	September 1, 2015	12-man roster cut

=== Depth chart ===
Pos.	Starting 5	Bench 1	Bench 2
C	Miroslav Raduljica	Ognjen Kuzmić	Nikola Milutinov
PF	Nemanja Bjelica	Zoran Erceg
SF	Nikola Kalinić	Marko Simonović
SG	Stefan Marković	Bogdan Bogdanović	Dragan Milosavljević
PG	Miloš Teodosić	Nemanja Nedović

== Staff ==
Position	Staff member	Age	Team
Head coach	(Serbia) Aleksandar Đorđević	48	(Greece) Panathinaikos
Assistant coaches	(Serbia) Miroslav Nikolić	59	—
Assistant coaches	(Serbia) Jovica Antonić	49	—
Assistant coaches	(Serbia) Milan Minić	60	(Greece) Panathinaikos
Assistant coaches	(Croatia) Goran Bjedov	44	(Greece) Panathinaikos
Team manager	(Serbia) Nebojša Ilić	48	(Serbia) Crvena zvezda
Conditioning coach	(Serbia) Mladen Mihajlović	30	—
Scouts	(Serbia) Dragan Popov		—
Scouts	(Serbia) Goran Topić	48	(Poland) Turów Zgorzelec
Doctor	(Serbia) Dragan Radovanović		—
Physiotherapists	(Serbia) Dušan Sajić		—
Physiotherapists	(Serbia) Velibor Kosanović		(Serbia) Vršac
Equipment Manager	(Serbia) Jovica Aničić		—
Press Officer	(Serbia) Vladimir Sibinović		—

Source: KSS

== Exhibition games ==
2 August 2015

Report

Hungary	61–81	Serbia
Scoring by quarter: 16–18, 14–24, 13–19, 18–20
Pts: Vojvoda 13; Rebs: not available Asts: not available		Pts: Nedović 14; Rebs: not available Asts: not available

Vitranc, Kranjska Gora
Attendance: 100
Referees: not available

7 August 2015
19:30

Report

France	78–65	Serbia
Scoring by quarter: 25–22, 8–5, 23–22, 22–16
Pts: Parker 16; Rebs: Gobert 6 Asts: Parker 7		Pts: Bogdanović 16; Rebs: Milutinov 7 Asts: three players 3

Jean Weille, Nancy
Attendance: 5,000
Referees: Emilio Perez Pizarro (ESP), Petri Mantyla (POL), Jakub Zamojski (POL)

8 August 2015

Report

Serbia	75–56	Russia
Scoring by quarter: 19–14, 23–14, 15–18, 18–10
Pts: Bjelica 16; Rebs: Kuzmić 6 Asts: Bjelica 8		Pts: Zubkov, Kurbanov 13; Rebs: Zubkov 10; Asts: Ponkrashov 8

Astroballe, Lyon
Attendance: 2,000
Referees: Jean-Charles Collin, David Chambon, Mehdi Difallah

12 August 2015
20:30

Report

Serbia	73–63	France
Scoring by quarter: 20–19, 21–14, 11–12, 21–18
Pts: Bjelica 12; Rebs: not available Asts: not available		Pts: de Colo 10; Rebs: not available Asts: not available

Kombank Arena, Belgrade
Attendance: 16,180
Referees: Ilija Belošević, Saša Maričić, Uroš Obrknežević

15 August 2015
20:30

Report

China	55–95	Serbia
Scoring by quarter: 15–19, 4–28, 11–28, 25–20
Pts: Wang Zhelin, Liu Wei 10; Rebs: Zhou Qi 6 Asts: not available		Pts: Raduljica 14; Rebs: not available Asts: Nedović 4

Kombank Arena, Belgrade
Attendance: 8,000
Referees: Uroš Obrknežević, Vladimir Jevtović, Radoš Arsenijević

16 August 2015
20:30

Report

Serbia	95–61	Russia
Scoring by quarter: 27–12, 12–19, 31–13, 25–17
Pts: Raduljica 15; Rebs: Teodosić 7 Asts: Teodosić 5		Pts: Ponkrashov 13; Rebs: not available Asts: not available

Kombank Arena, Belgrade
Attendance: 10,000
Referees: Saša Maričić, Vladimir Jevtović, Nemanja Ninković

22 August 2015
19:30

Report

Israel	70–85	Serbia
Scoring by quarter: 18–26, 14–17, 18–26, 20–16
Pts: Eliyahu 12; Rebs: not available Asts: not available		Pts: Nedović 16; Rebs: Bjelica 7 Asts: Teodosić 7

Tel Aviv
Attendance: not available
Referees: not available

23 August 2015
18:40

Report

Israel	71–79	Serbia
Scoring by quarter: 20–25, 16–22, 17–16, 18–16
Pts: Eliyahu 14; Rebs: not available Asts: not available		Pts: Raduljica 16; Rebs: Bjelica 11; Asts: Teodosić 6

Tel Aviv
Attendance: not available
Referees: not available

27 August 2015

Report

Slovenia	70–79	Serbia
Scoring by quarter: 20–22, 13–18, 16–16, 21–23
Pts: Omić 15; Rebs: not available Asts: not available		Pts: Bjelica 19; Rebs: Kalinić 5 Asts: Teodosić, Marković 5

Stožice Arena, Ljubljana
Attendance: 10,000
Referees: Matej Boltauzer, Mario Majkič, Milan Nedović

29 August 2015
18:00

Report

Serbia	95–88 (OT)	Slovenia
Scoring by quarter: 15–22, 23–20, 28–20, 18–22, Overtime: 11–4
Pts: Teodosić 20; Rebs: not available Asts: not available		Pts: Blažič 19; Rebs: Z. Dragić 9 Asts: Prepelič 6

Borik Arena, Banja Luka
Attendance: 4,000
Referees: not available

== Tournament ==
=== Preliminary round ===
Pos	Team	Pld	W	L	PF	PA	PD	Pts	Qualification
1	Serbia	5	5	0	433	354	+79	10	Advanced to Knockout stage
2	Spain	5	3	2	448	411	+37	8 (Note: Spain 1–1, +20; Italy 1–1, +5; Turkey 1–1 −25)	Advanced to Knockout stage
3	Italy	5	3	2	434	434	0	8	Advanced to Knockout stage
4	Turkey	5	3	2	429	459	−30	8	Advanced to Knockout stage
5	Germany	5	1	4	370	379	−9	6	
6	Iceland	5	0	5	368	445	−77	5	

Source: eurobasket2015.org
Rules for classification: 1) Points; 2) Head-to-head results; 3) Points difference; 4) Points scored.

==== Spain ====
5 September 2015
18:00

Boxscore

Spain	70–80	Serbia
Scoring by quarter: 21–11, 15–23, 16–28, 18–18
Pts: Gasol 16; Rebs: Mirotić 10; Asts: Llull 6		Pts: Bjelica 24; Rebs: Bjelica 10; Asts: Bogdanović 5

Mercedes-Benz Arena, Berlin
Attendance: 9,750
Referees: Christos Christodoulou (GRE), Sergiy Zashchuk (UKR), Robert Vyklický (CZE)

==== Germany ====
6 September 2015
15:00

Boxscore

Serbia	68–66	Germany
Scoring by quarter: 19–18, 20–20, 11–10, 18–18
Pts: Bjelica 12; Rebs: Kuzmić, Nedović 7 Asts: Bogdanović, Teodosić 4		Pts: Nowitzki, Pleiß 15; Rebs: Nowitzki 10; Asts: Schröder 6

Mercedes-Benz Arena, Berlin
Attendance: 13,050
Referees: Borys Ryzhyk (UKR), Aare Halliko (EST), Tomas Jasevičius (LTU)

==== Iceland ====
8 September 2015
14:30

Boxscore

Serbia	93–64	Iceland
Scoring by quarter: 24–16, 18–16, 25–16, 26–16
Pts: Nedović 15; Rebs: Bogdanović 7 Asts: Bogdanović, Teodosić 6		Pts: Gunnarsson 18; Rebs: Sigurðarson 6 Asts: Pálsson, Stefánsson 4

Mercedes-Benz Arena, Berlin
Attendance: 2,800
Referees: Sreten Radović (CRO), Robert Vyklický (CZE), Igor Mitrovski (MKD)

==== Turkey ====
9 September 2015
14:30

Boxscore

Turkey	72–91	Serbia
Scoring by quarter: 14–30, 21–23, 24–18, 13–20
Pts: Muhammed 16; Rebs: Osman 9 Asts: Güler 6		Pts: Raduljica 20; Rebs: Kuzmić, Raduljica 6 Asts: Teodosić 13

Mercedes-Benz Arena, Berlin
Attendance: 4,400
Referees: Borys Ryzhyk (UKR), Sergiy Zashchuk (UKR), Tomas Jasevičius (LTU)

==== Italy ====
10 September 2015
14:30

Boxscore

Serbia	101–82	Italy
Scoring by quarter: 25–19, 23–21, 26–19, 27–23
Pts: Teodosić 26; Rebs: Bjelica 8 Asts: Teodosić 8		Pts: Gentile 19; Rebs: Aradori 6 Asts: Gentile 6

Mercedes-Benz Arena, Berlin
Attendance: 4,185
Referees: Christos Christodoulou (GRE), Sergiy Zashchuk (UKR), Sašo Petek (SLO)

=== Knockout stage ===
==== Round of 16 ====
13 September 2015
14:30

Boxscore

Serbia	94–81	Finland
Scoring by quarter: 23–24, 25–19, 23–21, 23–17
Pts: Raduljica 27; Rebs: Bjelica 14; Asts: Teodosić 9		Pts: Salin 26; Rebs: Murphy 8 Asts: Koponen, Wilson 4

Stade Pierre-Mauroy, Lille
Attendance: 12,128
Referees: Robert Lottermoser (GER), Borys Ryzhyk (UKR), Sérgio Silva (POR)

==== Quarterfinals ====
16 September 2015
18:30

Boxscore

Serbia	89–75	Czech Republic
Scoring by quarter: 21–21, 24–21, 22–21, 22–12
Pts: Erceg 20; Rebs: Bjelica 10; Asts: Teodosić 14		Pts: Veselý 23; Rebs: Veselý 10; Asts: Pumprla, Satoranský 4

Stade Pierre-Mauroy, Lille
Attendance: 8,726
Referees: Christos Christodoulou (GRE), Oļegs Latiševs (LAT), Emin Moğulkoç (TUR)

==== Semifinals ====
18 September 2015
21:00

Boxscore

Serbia	64–67	Lithuania
Scoring by quarter: 17–22, 17–13, 9–13, 21–19
Pts: Teodosić 16; Rebs: three players 4 Asts: Bogdanović, Teodosić 3		Pts: Valančiūnas 15; Rebs: Kuzminskas 9 Asts: Kalnietis 9

Stade Pierre-Mauroy, Lille
Attendance: 20,042
Referees: Emilio Pérez (ESP), Oļegs Latiševs (LAT), Emin Moğulkoç (TUR)

==== Third place game ====
20 September 2015
14:00

Boxscore

France	81–68	Serbia
Scoring by quarter: 16–16, 21–16, 21–12, 23–24
Pts: de Colo 20; Rebs: Gobert 14; Asts: Diaw 6		Pts: Bogdanović 14; Rebs: Raduljica 8 Asts: Raduljica 4

Stade Pierre-Mauroy, Lille
Attendance: 24,092
Referees: Christos Christodoulou (GRE), Robert Lottermoser (GER), Fernando Rocha (POR)

=== Statistics ===
Legend
GP	Games played	GS	Games started	MPG	Minutes per game
FG%	Field-goal percentage	3FG%	3-point field-goal percentage	FT%	Free-throw percentage
RPG	Rebounds per game	APG	Assists per game	SPG	Steals per game
BPG	Blocks per game	PPG	Points per game	EF	PIR per game

Player	GP	GS	MPG	FG%	3FG%	FT%	RPG	APG	SPG	BPG	EF	PPG

Source: FIBA Europe
