= Ivan Paunić =

Serbian basketball player (born 1987)

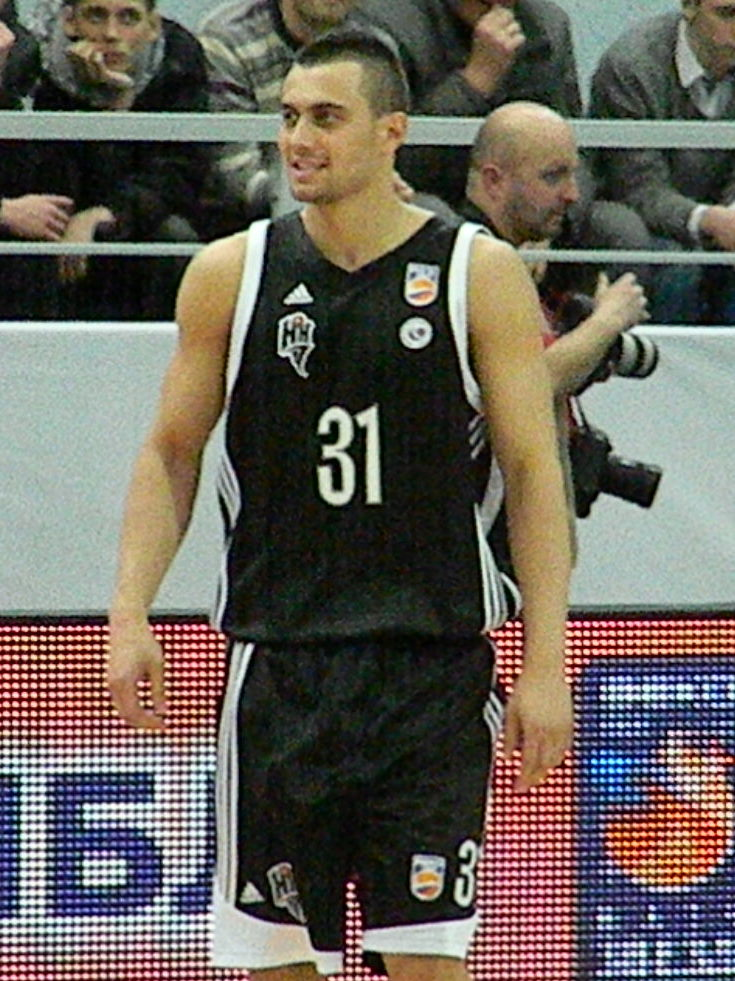
- Paunić with Nizhny Novgorod in March 2011.

Personal information
- Born: January 27, 1987 (age 39) Belgrade, SR Serbia, SFR Yugoslavia
- Listed height: 1.95 m (6 ft 5 in)
- Listed weight: 100 kg (220 lb)

Career information
- NBA draft: 2009: undrafted
- Playing career: 2004–2023
- Position: Shooting guard

Career history
- 2004–2006: Partizan
- 2005–2006: → Mega Ishrana
- 2006: → Mornar
- 2006–2008: Vojvodina Srbijagas
- 2008–2009: Base Oostende
- 2009–2010: Aris
- 2010–2012: Nizhny Novgorod
- 2012: Virtus Bologna
- 2012: Azovmash
- 2013: Lagun Aro GBC
- 2013–2014: Fuenlabrada
- 2014: Astana
- 2014–2015: Budućnost Podgorica
- 2015–2017: Fuenlabrada
- 2017: Tofaş
- 2019–2020: Chemidor Tehran
- 2020: Mega
- 2020–2023: Lokomotiv Kuban

Career highlights
- YUBA League champion (2005); Montenegro League champion (2015); Montenegrin Cup winner (2015)
Medals
Men's basketball
Representing Serbia
EuroBasket
Silver medal – second place	2009 Poland	Team
Universiade
Gold medal – first place	2009 Belgrade	Team competition
Silver medal – second place	2007 Bangkok	Team competition
U20 European Championship
Gold medal – first place	2007 Slovenia	Team
Representing Serbia and Montenegro
U20 European Championship
Gold medal – first place	2006 Turkey	Team
U18 European Championship
Gold medal – first place	2005 Serbia and Montenegro	Team

Ivan Paunić (Serbian Cyrillic: Иван Паунић; born January 27, 1987) is a Serbian former professional basketball player. He also represented the Serbian national basketball team internationally.

== Professional career ==
Paunić began playing basketball at a professional level in the Adriatic League when he was a teenager, beginning with Serbian club Partizan in the 2004–05 season. He spent next season on loan at Mega Ishrana and Mornar. In 2006 he was sent to Vojvodina Srbijagas. He spent two seasons in Vojvodina, and then in 2008 went to Oostende. In December 2009 he goes to Greece and signed with Aris Thessaloniki.

In August 2010, Paunić signed with the Russian team Nizhny Novgorod where he stayed till April 2012, when he moved to Italy and signed with Virtus Bolgna for the rest of the season. Paunic was the best player and scorer in Nizhny Novgorod

In July 2012, Paunić signed with the Ukrainian side Azovmash. He left them in December 2012. Couple days later he signed with Lagun Aro GBC till the end of the season. On September 25, 2013, he signed a one-year deal with Baloncesto Fuenlabrada.

On October 30, 2014, he signed with Astana in Kazakhstan. On December 18, 2014, he left Astana and signed with Budućnost Podgorica for the rest of the season. On August 25, 2015, he returned to Baloncesto Fuenlabrada. Playing for Fuenlabrada, Ivan Paunic was the club's top scorer and best three point shooter in the league On August 1, 2016, he re-signed with Fuenlabrada for one more season.

On September 25, 2017, he signed a contract with Turkish club Tofaş.

On April 5, 2019, he has signed with Chemidor Tehran of the Iranian Super League.

On February 13, 2020, he signed with Mega Bemax of the Basketball League of Serbia.

On October 14, 2020, he signed with Lokomotiv Kuban of the VTB United League, and of the EuroCup until the team was suspended due to the 2022 Russian invasion of Ukraine.

== Serbian national team ==
Paunić was a member of the Serbian national team that competed at the EuroBasket 2009 in Poland and won the silver medal. He played at the 2010 FIBA World Championship in Turkey where Serbia was fourth, and at the EuroBasket 2011 in Lithuania where Serbia finished eight of 24 teams.
