= EuroBasket 1999 squads =

The following is the list of squads for each of the 16 teams competing in the EuroBasket 1999, held in France between 21 June and 3 July 1999. Each team selected a squad of 12 players for the tournament.

== Group A ==
=== France ===
France men's national basketball team roster
Players
Coaches

Pos.	No.	Name	Age – Date of birth	Height	Club
G	4	Moustapha Sonko	27 – 14 June 1972	1.92 m (6 ft 4 in)	ASVEL Basket	(France)
G	5	Alain Digbeu	23 – 13 November 1975	1.98 m (6 ft 6 in)	FC Barcelona	(Spain)
PG	6	Antoine Rigaudeau	27 – 17 December 1971	2.00 m (6 ft 7 in)	Kinder Bologna	(Italy)
G	7	Laurent Foirest	25 – 18 September 1973	1.97 m (6 ft 6 in)	TAU Cerámica	(Spain)
PG	8	Laurent Sciarra	25 – 8 August 1973	1.95 m (6 ft 5 in)	Paris Basket Racing	(France)
F	9	Tariq Abdul-Wahad	24 – 3 November 1974	1.98 m (6 ft 6 in)	Sacramento Kings	(United States)
F	10	Stéphane Risacher	26 – 26 August 1972	2.03 m (6 ft 8 in)	Pau-Orthez	(France)
PF	11	Thierry Gadou	30 – 13 January 1969	2.05 m (6 ft 9 in)	Pau-Orthez	(France)
C	12	Cyril Julian	25 – 29 March 1974	2.06 m (6 ft 9 in)	Paris Basket Racing	(France)
C	13	Frédéric Weis	21 – 22 June 1977	2.18 m (7 ft 2 in)	Limoges CSP	(France)
PF	14	Jim Bilba	31 – 13 April 1968	1.98 m (6 ft 6 in)	ASVEL Basket	(France)
C	15	Ronnie Smith	37 – 21 April 1962	2.06 m (6 ft 9 in)	Pau-Orthez	(France)

Head coach

- Jean-Pierre de Vincenzi

Legend

- Club – describes last
  club before the tournament
- Age – describes age
  on 21 June 1999

=== Israel ===
Israel men's national basketball team roster
Players
Coaches

Pos.	No.	Name	Age – Date of birth	Height	Club
F	4	Nadav Henefeld	31 – 19 June 1968	2.02 m (6 ft 8 in)	Maccabi Tel Aviv	(Israel)
F	5	Moti Daniel	35 – 24 July 1963	1.98 m (6 ft 6 in)	Maccabi Rishon LeZion	(Israel)
PG	6	Guy Goodes	28 – 13 March 1971	1.90 m (6 ft 3 in)	Cantabria Baloncesto	(Spain)
G	7	Shalom Turgeman	29 – 7 April 1970	1.92 m (6 ft 4 in)	Hapoel Jerusalem	(Israel)
C	8	Shimon Amsalem	32 – 10 November 1966	2.04 m (6 ft 8 in)	Hapoel Tel Aviv	(Israel)
PG	9	Meir Tapiro	24 – 28 March 1975	1.92 m (6 ft 4 in)	Maccabi Haifa	(Israel)
PG	10	Oded Kattash	24 – 10 October 1974	1.92 m (6 ft 4 in)	Maccabi Tel Aviv	(Israel)
G	11	Doron Sheffer	27 – 12 March 1972	1.95 m (6 ft 5 in)	Maccabi Tel Aviv	(Israel)
F	12	Gur Shelef	25 – 10 January 1974	2.04 m (6 ft 8 in)	Maccabi Tel Aviv	(Israel)
F	13	Uri Cohen-Mintz	25 – 1 August 1973	2.05 m (6 ft 9 in)	Ironi Ramat Gan	(Israel)
C	14	Tomer Steinhauer	32 – 3 October 1966	2.07 m (6 ft 9 in)	Maccabi Ra'anana	(Israel)
PF	15	Yoav Saffar	23 – 30 September 1975	2.06 m (6 ft 9 in)	Maccabi Ra'anana	(Israel)

Head coach

- Muli Katzurin

Legend

- Club – describes last
  club before the tournament
- Age – describes age
  on 21 June 1999

=== Macedonia ===
Macedonia men's national basketball team roster
Players
Coaches

Pos.	No.	Name	Age – Date of birth	Height	Club
PG	4	Vrbica Stefanov	25 – 19 December 1973	1.85 m (6 ft 1 in)	Rabotnički	(North Macedonia)
PG	5	Vlado Ilievski	19 – 19 January 1980	1.87 m (6 ft 2 in)	Partizan Belgrade	(Federal Republic of Yugoslavia)
PF	6	Gjorgji Čekovski	19 – 11 December 1979	2.02 m (6 ft 8 in)	Rabotnički	(North Macedonia)
SG	7	Mirza Kurtović	21 – 2 August 1977	1.94 m (6 ft 4 in)	MZT Skopje Aerodrom	(North Macedonia)
SF	8	Marjan Srbinovski	24 – 8 December 1974	1.97 m (6 ft 6 in)	Rabotnički	(North Macedonia)
PF	9	Igor Mihajlovski	25 – 24 December 1973	2.05 m (6 ft 9 in)	Rabotnički	(North Macedonia)
G	10	Petar Naumoski	30 – 27 August 1968	1.95 m (6 ft 5 in)	Efes Pilsen	(Turkey)
C	11	Todor Gečevski	21 – 28 August 1977	2.10 m (6 ft 11 in)	Feni Industries	(North Macedonia)
SF	12	Dejan Jovanovski	26 – 26 March 1973	1.98 m (6 ft 6 in)	KK Gostivar	(North Macedonia)
C	13	Srdjan Stanković	23 – 28 August 1975	2.08 m (6 ft 10 in)	Rabotnički	(North Macedonia)
SF	14	Pero Blazevski	26 – 28 September 1972	2.00 m (6 ft 7 in)	MZT Skopje Aerodrom	(North Macedonia)
C	15	Dušan Bocevski	25 – 5 November 1973	2.08 m (6 ft 10 in)	SV Oberelchingen	(Germany)

Head coach

- Zare Markovski

Legend

- Club – describes last
  club before the tournament
- Age – describes age
  on 21 June 1999

=== FR Yugoslavia ===
FR Yugoslavia men's national basketball team roster
Players
Coaches

Pos.	No.	Name	Age – Date of birth	Height	Club
SF	4	Dejan Bodiroga	26 – 2 March 1973	2.05 m (6 ft 9 in)	Panathinaikos	(Greece)
SG	5	Predrag Danilović	29 – 26 February 1970	2.01 m (6 ft 7 in)	Kinder Bologna	(Italy)
PG	6	Saša Obradović	30 – 29 January 1969	1.97 m (6 ft 6 in)	Calze Pompea Roma	(Italy)
SF	7	Nikola Lončar	27 – 31 May 1972	1.98 m (6 ft 6 in)	Pinturas Bruguer Badalona	(Spain)
SF	8	Milan Gurović	24 – 17 June 1975	2.04 m (6 ft 8 in)	FC Barcelona	(Spain)
SG	9	Vlado Šćepanović	23 – 13 November 1975	1.98 m (6 ft 6 in)	Budućnost Podgorica	(Federal Republic of Yugoslavia)
PG	10	Dragan Lukovski	24 – 21 March 1975	1.85 m (6 ft 1 in)	Partizan Belgrade	(Federal Republic of Yugoslavia)
SF	11	Predrag Stojaković	22 – 9 June 1977	2.08 m (6 ft 10 in)	Sacramento Kings	(United States)
C	12	Vlade Divac	31 – 3 February 1968	2.16 m (7 ft 1 in)	Sacramento Kings	(United States)
C	13	Dragan Tarlać	26 – 9 May 1973	2.11 m (6 ft 11 in)	Olympiacos	(Greece)
PF	14	Dejan Tomašević	26 – 6 May 1973	2.08 m (6 ft 10 in)	Partizan Belgrade	(Federal Republic of Yugoslavia)
PF	15	Milenko Topić	30 – 6 March 1969	2.04 m (6 ft 8 in)	Red Star Belgrade	(Federal Republic of Yugoslavia)

Head coach

- Želimir Obradović

Assistant coach(es)

- Darko Russo
- Dragan Šakota

Legend

- Club – describes last
  club before the tournament
- Age – describes age
  on 21 June 1999

== Group B ==
=== Hungary ===
Hungary men's national basketball team roster
Players
Coaches

Pos.	No.	Name	Age – Date of birth	Height	Club
PF	4	Ernő Sitku	27 – 9 January 1972	2.08 m (6 ft 10 in)
G	5	Tamás Bencze	30 – 21 November 1968	1.94 m (6 ft 4 in)
PG	6	László Kálmán	26 – 20 December 1972	1.86 m (6 ft 1 in)
F	7	Rolland Halm	30 – 20 April 1969
G	8	István Németh	19 – 16 November 1979	1.88 m (6 ft 2 in)	Marc-Körmend	(Hungary)
PF	9	Kornél Dávid	27 – 22 October 1971	2.08 m (6 ft 10 in)	Albacomp	(Hungary)
F	10	Tibor Pankár	22 – 26 October 1976	1.96 m (6 ft 5 in)
PG	11	Zoltán Boros	29 – 23 January 1970	1.94 m (6 ft 4 in)
C	12	László Orosz	28 – 4 March 1971
C	13	Róbert Gulyás	24 – 28 July 1974	2.13 m (7 ft 0 in)	Atomerőmű SE	(Hungary)
G	14	Zalán Mészáros	25 – 14 March 1974	1.90 m (6 ft 3 in)
C	15	László Czigler	27 – 21 September 1971	2.15 m (7 ft 1 in)

Head coach

- Lajos Mészáros

Legend

- Club – describes last
  club before the tournament
- Age – describes age
  on 21 June 1999

=== Russia ===
Russia men's national basketball team roster
Players
Coaches

Pos.	No.	Name	Age – Date of birth	Height	Club
PG	4	Vasily Karasev	28 – 14 April 1971	1.93 m (6 ft 4 in)	CSKA Moscow	(Russia)
G	5	Igor Kudelin	26 – 10 August 1972	1.95 m (6 ft 5 in)	CSKA Moscow	(Russia)
PF	6	Alexander Petrenko	23 – 4 February 1976	2.05 m (6 ft 9 in)	Arsenal Tula	(Russia)
PF	7	Evgeni Kisurin	30 – 28 January 1969	2.07 m (6 ft 9 in)	CSKA Moscow	(Russia)
PG	8	Evgeniy Pashutin	30 – 2 June 1969	1.88 m (6 ft 2 in)	Avtodor Saratov	(Russia)
PF	9	Valeri Tikhonenko	34 – 19 August 1964	2.07 m (6 ft 9 in)	CSKA Moscow	(Russia)
G	10	Sergei Babkov	32 – 5 June 1967	1.92 m (6 ft 4 in)	Unicaja Málaga	(Spain)
C	11	Igor Kurashov	27 – 2 April 1972	2.07 m (6 ft 9 in)	SAV Vacallo Basket	(Switzerland)
G	12	Zakhar Pashutin	25 – 3 May 1974	1.96 m (6 ft 5 in)	Avtodor Saratov	(Russia)
PF	13	Ruslan Avleev	23 – 4 June 1976	1.98 m (6 ft 6 in)	UNICS Kazan	(Russia)
F	14	Sergei Panov	28 – 30 June 1970	2.05 m (6 ft 9 in)	PBC CSKA Moscow	(Russia)
C	15	Vitaliy Nosov	31 – 1 February 1968	2.12 m (6 ft 11 in)	Sporting Athens	(Greece)

Head coach

- Sergei Belov

Legend

- Club – describes last
  club before the tournament
- Age – describes age
  on 21 June 1999

=== Slovenia ===
Slovenia men's national basketball team roster
Players
Coaches

Pos.	No.	Name	Age – Date of birth	Height	Club	Ctr.
PG	4	Jure Zdovc	32 – 13 December 1966	1.98 m (6 ft 6 in)	Union Olimpija	(Slovenia)
PG	5	Walter Jeklin	29 – 27 September 1969	1.87 m (6 ft 2 in)	AZS UMK Toruń	(Poland)
PG	6	Jaka Daneu	28 – 3 February 1971	1.94 m (6 ft 4 in)	Union Olimpija	(Slovenia)
G	7	Sani Bečirovič	18 – 19 May 1981	1.96 m (6 ft 5 in)	Union Olimpija	(Slovenia)
C	8	Marijan Kraljević	29 – 30 April 1970	2.12 m (6 ft 11 in)	Union Olimpija	(Slovenia)
F	9	Matjaž Tovornik	39 – 3 January 1960	2.02 m (6 ft 8 in)	Pošta Maribor	(Slovenia)
PF	10	Matjaž Smodiš	19 – 13 December 1979	2.05 m (6 ft 9 in)	Krka	(Slovenia)
F	11	Goran Jagodnik	25 – 23 May 1974	2.02 m (6 ft 8 in)	Hopsi Polzela	(Slovenia)
F	12	Marko Milič	22 – 7 May 1977	1.99 m (6 ft 6 in)	Phoenix Suns	(United States)
PF	13	Ivica Jurković	26 – 26 March 1973	2.04 m (6 ft 8 in)	Türk Telekom	(Turkey)
C	14	Radoslav Nesterovič	23 – 30 May 1976	2.13 m (7 ft 0 in)	Minnesota Timberwolves	(United States)
PG	15	Ervin Dragšič	24 – 22 October 1974	1.85 m (6 ft 1 in)	Zlatorog	(Slovenia)

Head coach

- Boris Zrinski

Legend

- Club – describes last
  club before the tournament
- Age – describes age
  on 21 June 1999

=== Spain ===
Spain men's national basketball team roster
Players
Coaches

Pos.	No.	Name	Age – Date of birth	Height	Club
G	4	Alberto Angulo	29 – 12 June 1970	1.96 m (6 ft 5 in)	Real Madrid	(Spain)
PG	5	Ignacio Rodilla	25 – 12 March 1974	1.92 m (6 ft 4 in)	Pamesa Valencia	(Spain)
PG	6	Iván Corrales	24 – 12 July 1974	1.82 m (6 ft 0 in)	Pinturas Bruguer Badalona	(Spain)
PF	7	Ignacio Romero	25 – 30 July 1973	2.14 m (7 ft 0 in)	Caja San Fernando	(Spain)
PG	8	Ignacio Rodríguez	28 – 2 September 1970	1.86 m (6 ft 1 in)	FC Barcelona	(Spain)
F	9	Carlos Jiménez	23 – 10 February 1976	2.04 m (6 ft 8 in)	Adecco Estudiantes	(Spain)
F	10	Rodrigo de la Fuente	22 – 26 November 1976	2.00 m (6 ft 7 in)	FC Barcelona	(Spain)
F	11	Alberto Herreros	30 – 20 April 1969	2.00 m (6 ft 7 in)	Real Madrid	(Spain)
G	12	Roger Esteller	26 – 6 July 1972	1.91 m (6 ft 3 in)	FC Barcelona	(Spain)
C	13	Iñaki de Miguel	25 – 24 October 1973	2.05 m (6 ft 9 in)	Adecco Estudiantes	(Spain)
C	14	Alfonso Reyes	27 – 19 September 1971	2.02 m (6 ft 8 in)	Adecco Estudiantes	(Spain)
C	15	Roberto Dueñas	23 – 1 November 1975	2.21 m (7 ft 3 in)	FC Barcelona	(Spain)

Head coach

- Lolo Sainz

Legend

- Club – describes last
  club before the tournament
- Age – describes age
  on 21 June 1999

== Group C ==
=== Bosnia and Herzegovina ===
Bosnia and Herzegovina men's national basketball team roster
Players
Coaches

Pos.	No.	Name	Age – Date of birth	Height	Club
G	4	Nenad Marković	31 – 6 June 1968	1.96 m (6 ft 5 in)	Limoges CSP	(France)
F	5	Gordan Firić	28 – 1 September 1970	1.97 m (6 ft 6 in)	Aurora Basket Jesi	(Italy)
PG	6	Adis Bećiragić	29 – 18 June 1970	1.90 m (6 ft 3 in)	Ülkerspor	(Turkey)
PF	7	Samir Lerić	25 – 12 September 1973	2.06 m (6 ft 9 in)	Bosna	(Bosnia and Herzegovina)
G	8	Ivan Opačak	19 – 23 April 1980	2.02 m (6 ft 8 in)	Čelik Zenica	(Bosnia and Herzegovina)
F	9	Jasmin Hukić	19 – 15 August 1979	2.04 m (6 ft 8 in)	Sloboda Tuzla	(Bosnia and Herzegovina)
PG	10	Damir Mirković	22 – 6 January 1977	1.95 m (6 ft 5 in)	Bosna	(Bosnia and Herzegovina)
PF	11	Tarik Valjevac	21 – 17 July 1977	2.08 m (6 ft 10 in)
G	12	Abdurahman Kahrimanović	24 – 3 March 1975	1.96 m (6 ft 5 in)	Čelik Zenica	(Bosnia and Herzegovina)
C	12	Dževad Alihodžić	30 – 13 February 1969	2.11 m (6 ft 11 in)	Ülkerspor	(Turkey)
PF	13	Elvir Ovčina	22 – 16 July 1976	2.11 m (6 ft 11 in)	Syracuse University	(United States)
PF	15	Haris Mujezinović	25 – 21 January 1974	2.05 m (6 ft 9 in)	Carne Montana Forlì	(Italy)

Head coach

- Sabit Hadžić

Legend

- Club – describes last
  club before the tournament
- Age – describes age
  on 21 June 1999

=== Croatia ===
Croatia men's national basketball team roster
Players
Coaches

Pos.	No.	Name	Age – Date of birth	Height	Club
PG	4	Vladimir Krstić	26 – 27 July 1972	1.84 m (6 ft 0 in)	Cibona Zagreb	(Croatia)
PG	5	Damir Mulaomerović	24 – 19 September 1974	1.96 m (6 ft 5 in)	Teamsystem Bologna	(Italy)
F	6	Veljko Mršić	28 – 13 April 1971	2.03 m (6 ft 8 in)	Pallacanestro Varese	(Italy)
PF	7	Toni Kukoč	30 – 18 September 1968	2.11 m (6 ft 11 in)	Chicago Bulls	(United States)
PF	8	Nikola Prkačin	23 – 15 November 1975	2.08 m (6 ft 10 in)	Cibona Zagreb	(Croatia)
F	9	Gordan Zadravec	30 – 18 June 1969	2.07 m (6 ft 9 in)	Skanska Pezinok	(Slovakia)
G	10	Gordan Giriček	22 – 20 June 1977	1.98 m (6 ft 6 in)	Cibona Zagreb	(Croatia)
C	11	Joško Poljak	21 – 19 February 1978	2.14 m (7 ft 0 in)	Croatia Osiguranje	(Croatia)
G	12	Jurica Ružić	21 – 21 September 1977	2.01 m (6 ft 7 in)	Zadar	(Croatia)
PG	13	Ivan Tomeljak	20 – 2 February 1979	1.94 m (6 ft 4 in)	Croatia Osiguranje	(Croatia)
C	14	Nikola Vujčić	21 – 14 June 1978	2.11 m (6 ft 11 in)	Croatia Osiguranje	(Croatia)
C	15	Hrvoje Henjak	20 – 27 September 1978	2.15 m (7 ft 1 in)	Croatia Osiguranje	(Croatia)

Head coach

- Boško Božić

Legend

- Club – describes last
  club before the tournament
- Age – describes age
  on 21 June 1999

=== Italy ===
Italy men's national basketball team roster
Players
Coaches

Pos.	No.	Name	Age – Date of birth	Height	Club
PG	4	Davide Bonora	26 – 5 February 1973	1.86 m (6 ft 1 in)	Benetton Treviso	(Italy)
G	5	Gianluca Basile	24 – 24 January 1975	1.92 m (6 ft 4 in)	Zuchetti Software Reggio Emilia	(Italy)
PF	6	Giacomo Galanda	24 – 30 January 1975	2.10 m (6 ft 11 in)	Pallacanestro Varese	(Italy)
PF	7	Gregor Fučka	27 – 7 August 1971	2.15 m (7 ft 1 in)	Teamsystem Bologna	(Italy)
C	8	Denis Marconato	23 – 29 July 1975	2.11 m (6 ft 11 in)	Benetton Treviso	(Italy)
F	9	Alessandro De Pol	26 – 15 July 1972	2.04 m (6 ft 8 in)	Zuchetti Software Reggio Emilia	(Italy)
G	10	Carlton Myers	28 – 30 March 1971	1.92 m (6 ft 4 in)	Teamsystem Bologna	(Italy)
PG	11	Andrea Meneghin	25 – 20 February 1974	2.00 m (6 ft 7 in)	Pallacanestro Varese	(Italy)
G	12	Alessandro Abbio	28 – 13 March 1971	1.93 m (6 ft 4 in)	Kinder Bologna	(Italy)
G	13	Michele Mian	25 – 18 July 1973	1.96 m (6 ft 5 in)	Unione Ginnastica Goriziana	(Italy)
C	14	Roberto Chiacig	24 – 1 December 1974	2.10 m (6 ft 11 in)	Teamsystem Bologna	(Italy)
PF	15	Marcelo Damiao	24 – 19 March 1975	2.04 m (6 ft 8 in)	Teamsystem Bologna	(Italy)

Head coach

- Bogdan Tanjević

Legend

- Club – describes last
  club before the tournament
- Age – describes age
  on 21 June 1999

=== Turkey ===
Turkey men's national basketball team roster
Players
Coaches

Pos.	No.	Name	Age – Date of birth	Height	Club
PG	4	Kerem Tunçeri	20 – 14 April 1979	1.90 m (6 ft 3 in)	Galatasaray	(Turkey)
F	5	Hedo Türkoğlu	20 – 19 March 1979	2.08 m (6 ft 10 in)	Efes Pilsen	(Turkey)
PF	6	Mirsad Türkcan	23 – 7 June 1976	2.06 m (6 ft 9 in)	Efes Pilsen	(Turkey)
G	7	Cüneyt Erden	21 – 5 September 1977	1.85 m (6 ft 1 in)	Tofaş	(Turkey)
F	8	Murat Konuk	27 – 18 February 1972	2.03 m (6 ft 8 in)	Tofaş	(Turkey)
G	9	Haluk Yıldırım	26 – 25 June 1972	2.01 m (6 ft 7 in)	Ülkerspor	(Turkey)
G	10	İbrahim Kutluay	25 – 7 January 1974	1.97 m (6 ft 6 in)	Fenerbahçe	(Turkey)
PF	11	Mehmet Okur	20 – 26 May 1979	2.11 m (6 ft 11 in)	Tofaş	(Turkey)
C	12	Hüseyin Beşok	23 – 2 August 1975	2.12 m (6 ft 11 in)	Efes Pilsen	(Turkey)
C	13	Tamer Oyguç	33 – 11 January 1966	2.10 m (6 ft 11 in)	Fenerbahçe	(Turkey)
C	14	Asım Pars	23 – 1 April 1976	2.11 m (6 ft 11 in)	Tofaş	(Turkey)
F	15	Ufuk Sarıca	27 – 13 June 1972	1.94 m (6 ft 4 in)	Efes Pilsen	(Turkey)

Head coach

- Erman Kunter

Legend

- Club – describes last
  club before the tournament
- Age – describes age
  on 21 June 1999

== Group D ==
=== Czech Republic ===
Czech Republic men's national basketball team roster
Players
Coaches

Pos.	No.	Name	Age – Date of birth	Height	Club
PG	4	Petr Czudek	27 – 30 October 1971	1.86 m (6 ft 1 in)	Opava	(Czech Republic)
PG	5	Petr Welsch	23 – 30 April 1976
F	6	Vladan Vahala	27 – 25 July 1971
F	7	Marek Stuchlý	24 – 12 May 1975	2.00 m (6 ft 7 in)	NH Ostrava	(Czech Republic)
G	8	Jiří Welsch	19 – 27 January 1980	1.97 m (6 ft 6 in)	Sparta Prague	(Czech Republic)
C	9	David Klapetek	32 – 17 June 1967	2.04 m (6 ft 8 in)
C	10	Jiří Okáč	35 – 3 November 1963	2.17 m (7 ft 1 in)	Opava	(Czech Republic)
F	11	Luboš Bartoň	19 – 7 April 1980	2.00 m (6 ft 7 in)	Valparaiso University	(United States)
G	12	Petr Treml	31 – 23 November 1967
C	13	Martin Ides	19 – 3 May 1980	2.15 m (7 ft 1 in)
PF	14	Kamil Novák	32 – 15 April 1967	2.06 m (6 ft 9 in)
PF	15	Pavel Bečka	28 – 7 November 1970

Head coach

- Zdeněk Hummel

Legend

- Club – describes last
  club before the tournament
- Age – describes age
  on 21 June 1999

=== Germany ===
Germany men's national basketball team roster
Players
Coaches

Pos.	No.	Name	Age – Date of birth	Height	Club
PG	4	Henrik Rödl	30 – 4 March 1969	2.00 m (6 ft 7 in)	Alba Berlin	(Germany)
G	5	Jörg Lütcke	23 – 12 December 1975	2.00 m (6 ft 7 in)	Alba Berlin	(Germany)
PG	6	Kai Nürnberger	33 – 2 June 1966	1.83 m (6 ft 0 in)	TTL uniVersa Bamberg	(Germany)
PG	7	Vladimir Bogojević	23 – 1 January 1976	1.96 m (6 ft 5 in)	Alba Berlin	(Germany)
G	8	Denis Wucherer	26 – 7 May 1973	1.95 m (6 ft 5 in)	Sony Milano	(Italy)
G	9	Drazan Tomic	25 – 27 April 1974	1.97 m (6 ft 6 in)	Telekom Baskets Bonn	(Germany)
C	10	Patrick Femerling	24 – 4 March 1975	2.15 m (7 ft 1 in)	Alba Berlin	(Germany)
PF	11	Gerrit Terdenge	24 – 30 January 1975	2.05 m (6 ft 9 in)	Bayer Giants Leverkusen	(Germany)
PF	12	Stephen Arigbabu	27 – 15 February 1972	2.06 m (6 ft 9 in)	Papagou	(Greece)
F	13	Ademola Okulaja	23 – 10 July 1975	2.06 m (6 ft 9 in)	University of North Carolina at Chapel Hill	(United States)
C	14	Tim Nees	27 – 30 October 1971	2.09 m (6 ft 10 in)	ratiopharm Ulm	(Germany)
PF	15	Dirk Nowitzki	21 – 19 June 1978	2.13 m (7 ft 0 in)	Dallas Mavericks	(United States)

Head coach

- Henrik Dettmann

Legend

- Club – describes last
  club before the tournament
- Age – describes age
  on 21 June 1999

=== Greece ===
Greece men's national basketball team roster
Players
Coaches

Pos.	No.	Name	Age – Date of birth	Height	Club
PG	4	Georgios Kalaitzis	22 – 29 October 1976	1.95 m (6 ft 5 in)	Panathinaikos	(Greece)
F	5	Georgios Balogiannis	28 – 17 January 1971	1.99 m (6 ft 6 in)	P.A.O.K.	(Greece)
PG	6	Nikos Boudouris	27 – 25 September 1971	1.92 m (6 ft 4 in)	Panathinaikos	(Greece)
F	7	Dimitrios Papanikolaou	22 – 7 February 1977	2.02 m (6 ft 8 in)	Olympiacos	(Greece)
G	8	Giorgos Sigalas	28 – 31 July 1970	2.01 m (6 ft 7 in)	Aris	(Greece)
PG	9	Angelos Koronios	30 – 16 March 1969	1.85 m (6 ft 1 in)	A.E.K. Athens	(Greece)
F	10	Fragiskos Alvertis	25 – 11 June 1974	2.06 m (6 ft 9 in)	Panathinaikos	(Greece)
PF	11	Vassilis Soulis	22 – 24 September 1976	2.07 m (6 ft 9 in)	Olympiacos	(Greece)
C	12	Jake Tsakalidis	20 – 10 June 1979	2.20 m (7 ft 3 in)	A.E.K. Athens	(Greece)
PF	13	Giannis Giannoulis	23 – 5 June 1976	2.08 m (6 ft 10 in)	P.A.O.K.	(Greece)
F	14	Michalis Kakiouzis	22 – 29 November 1976	2.07 m (6 ft 9 in)	A.E.K. Athens	(Greece)
PF	15	Georgios Karagkoutis	23 – 15 February 1976	2.08 m (6 ft 10 in)	Panionios	(Greece)

Head coach

- Kostas Petropoulos

Legend

- Club – describes last
  club before the tournament
- Age – describes age
  on 21 June 1999

=== Lithuania ===
Lithuania men's national basketball team roster
Players
Coaches

Pos.	No.	Name	Age – Date of birth	Height	Club
PG	4	Šarūnas Jasikevičius	23 – 5 March 1976	1.93 m (6 ft 4 in)	Lietuvos rytas	(Lithuania)
F	5	Mindaugas Žukauskas	23 – 24 August 1975	2.02 m (6 ft 8 in)	Žalgiris Kaunas	(Lithuania)
PF	6	Tomas Masiulis	23 – 19 September 1975	2.05 m (6 ft 9 in)	Žalgiris Kaunas	(Lithuania)
F	7	Saulius Štombergas	25 – 14 December 1973	2.04 m (6 ft 8 in)	Žalgiris Kaunas	(Lithuania)
PG	8	Kęstutis Marčiulionis	23 – 24 March 1976	1.88 m (6 ft 2 in)	University of Delaware	(United States)
C	9	Eurelijus Žukauskas	25 – 22 August 1973	2.18 m (7 ft 2 in)	Žalgiris Kaunas	(Lithuania)
G	10	Dainius Adomaitis	25 – 19 January 1974	1.94 m (6 ft 4 in)	RB Montecatini Terme	(Italy)
C	11	Arvydas Sabonis	34 – 19 December 1964	2.21 m (7 ft 3 in)	Portland Trail Blazers	(United States)
F	12	Artūras Karnišovas	28 – 27 April 1971	2.04 m (6 ft 8 in)	Teamsystem Bologna	(Italy)
PG	13	Darius Maskoliūnas	28 – 6 January 1971	1.95 m (6 ft 5 in)	Žalgiris Kaunas	(Lithuania)
PF	14	Gintaras Einikis	29 – 30 September 1969	2.08 m (6 ft 10 in)	Avtodor Saratov	(Russia)
PF	15	Virginijus Praškevičius	25 – 3 April 1974	2.06 m (6 ft 9 in)	Beşiktaş	(Turkey)

Head coach

- Jonas Kazlauskas

Legend

- Club – describes last
  club before the tournament
- Age – describes age
  on 21 June 1999
