= EuroBasket 1999 =

International basketball event

Championnat d'Europe masculin de basket-ball 1999

Tournament details
- Host country: France
- Dates: 21 June – 3 July
- Teams: 16
- Venues: 7 (in 7 host cities)

Final positions
- Champions: Italy (2nd title)
- Runners-up: Spain
- Third place: Yugoslavia
- Fourth place: France

Tournament statistics
- Games played: 54
- MVP: (Italy) Gregor Fučka
- Top scorer: (Spain) Alberto Herreros (19.2 ppg)
- Top rebounds: (Lithuania) Arvydas Sabonis (8.5 rpg)
- Top assists: (Croatia) Toni Kukoč (6.3 apg)

Official website
- EuroBasket 1999 (archive)

The 1999 FIBA European Championship, commonly called FIBA EuroBasket 1999, was the 31st FIBA EuroBasket regional basketball championship held by FIBA Europe, which also served as Europe qualifier for the 2000 Olympic Tournament, giving a berth to the top five (or six, depending on Serbia reaching one of the top five places) teams in the final standings. It was held in France between 21 June and 3 July 1999. Sixteen national teams entered the event under the auspices of FIBA Europe, the sport's regional governing body. The cities of Antibes, Clermont-Ferrand, Dijon, Le Mans, Paris, Pau and Toulouse hosted the tournament. Italy won its second FIBA European title by defeating Spain with a 64–56 score in the final. Italy's Gregor Fučka was voted the tournament's MVP.

== Venues ==
Location	Picture	City	Arena	Capacity	Status	Round
EuroBasket 1999 is located in France		Antibes	Jean Bunoz Sports Hall	5,051	Opened in 1991	Group C
EuroBasket 1999 is located in France		Clermont-Ferrand	Clermont-Ferrand Sports Hall	7,000		Group B
EuroBasket 1999 is located in France		Dijon	Palais des Sports de Dijon	4,628	Opened in 1977	Group D
EuroBasket 1999 is located in France		Le Mans	Antarès	6,003	Opened in 1995	Group F (second round)
EuroBasket 1999 is located in France		Paris	Palais Omnisports de Paris-Bercy	13,200	Opened in 1984	Championship and classification rounds
EuroBasket 1999 is located in France		Pau	Palais des Sports de Pau	7,707	Opened in 1991	Group E (second round)
EuroBasket 1999 is located in France		Toulouse	Palais des Sports de Toulouse	5,000	Opened in 1983	Group A and one match from Group B

== Qualification ==
Of the sixteen teams that participated in EuroBasket 1999 only two earned direct berths: France as hosts and the champions from EuroBasket 1997, Yugoslavia. The other fourteen teams earned their berths via a qualifying tournament.

Competition	Date	Vacancies	Qualified
Host nation	–	1	France
Champions from EuroBasket 1997	24 June – 6 July 1997	1	Yugoslavia
Qualified through Qualifying Round	22 May 1996 – 28 February 1999	14	Bosnia and Herzegovina; Croatia; Czech Republic; Germany; Greece; Hungary; Israel; Italy; Lithuania; North Macedonia; Russia; Slovenia; Spain; Turkey

Group A	Group B	Group C	Group D
Yugoslavia; France; Israel; North Macedonia	Russia; Spain; Slovenia; Hungary	Turkey; Italy; Croatia; Bosnia and Herzegovina	Czech Republic; Germany; Lithuania; Greece

== Format ==
- The teams were split in four groups of four teams each where they played a round robin. The top three teams from each group advance to the second stage.
- In the second stage, two groups of six teams were formed and played a round robin. The results between teams that faced during the preliminary round are carried over. The top four teams from each group in the second stage advance to the knockout quarterfinals to compete for the Championship. The winners in the semifinals compete for the European Championship, while the losers from the semifinals play a consolation game for the third place.
- The losers in the quarterfinals compete in a separate bracket to define 5th through 8th place in the final standings.

=== Tie-breaking criteria ===
Ties were broken via the following the criteria, with the first option used first, all the way down to the last option:

1. Head to head results
2. Basket difference between the tied teams
3. Goal average of the tied teams for all teams in its group

== Squads ==
At the start of tournament, all 16 participating countries had 12 players on their roster.

== Preliminary round ==
Qualified for the second round

Times given below are in Central European Summer Time (UTC+2).

=== Group A ===
Team	Pld	W	L	PF	PA	PD	Pts
Yugoslavia	3	3	0	227	181	+46	6
France	3	2	1	200	196	+4	5
Israel	3	1	2	191	220	−29	4
North Macedonia	3	0	3	197	218	−21	3

21 June
18:00

Boxscore

Israel	61–81	Yugoslavia
Scoring by half: 23–38, 38–43
Pts: Sheffer 18; Rebs: Sheffer 5 Asts: Henefeld 4		Pts: Tomašević 24; Rebs: Tomašević 12; Asts: 4 Players 3

Palais des sports de Toulouse, Toulouse
Referees: Philippe Leemann (SUI), Nikolaos Pitsilkas (GRE)

21 June
20:45

Boxscore

North Macedonia	67–71	France
Scoring by half: 40–42, 27–29
Pts: Naumoski 27; Rebs: Bocevski, Naumoski 4 Asts: Naumoski 5		Pts: Abdul-Wahad 24; Rebs: Bilba 9 Asts: Sonko 4

Palais des sports de Toulouse, Toulouse
Referees: Romualdas Brazauskas (LTU), Peter Klingbiel (GER)

22 June
18:30

Boxscore

Yugoslavia	83–68	North Macedonia
Scoring by half: 51–40, 32–28
Pts: Bodiroga 19; Rebs: Bodiroga 6 Asts: Lukovski 7		Pts: Stefanov 23; Rebs: Bocevski, Stanković 4 Asts: Kurtović, Stefanov 3

Palais des sports de Toulouse, Toulouse
Referees: Peter Klingbiel (GER), György Varadi (HUN)

22 June
20:45

Boxscore

France	77–66	Israel
Scoring by half: 37–34, 40–32
Pts: Abdul-Wahad 19; Rebs: Abdul-Wahad 8 Asts: Abdul-Wahad 3		Pts: Steinhauer 19; Rebs: Steinhauer 7 Asts: Goodes 7

Palais des sports de Toulouse, Toulouse
Referees: Philippe Leemann (SUI), Romualdas Brazauskas (LTU)

23 June
18:30

Boxscore

North Macedonia	62–64	Israel
Scoring by half: 37–29, 25–35
Pts: Stefanov 14; Rebs: Bocevski 12; Asts: Stefanov 8		Pts: Henefeld 21; Rebs: Henefeld 8 Asts: Kattash 5

Palais des sports de Toulouse, Toulouse
Referees: Romualdas Brazauskas (LTU), György Varadi (HUN)

23 June
20:45

Boxscore

Yugoslavia	63–52	France
Scoring by half: 27–33, 36–19
Pts: Bodiroga 16; Rebs: Tomašević 9 Asts: Divac, Obradović 3		Pts: Abdul-Wahad 13; Rebs: Bilba 7 Asts: Sciarra 3

Palais des sports de Toulouse, Toulouse
Referees: Philippe Leemann (SUI), Nikolaos Pitsilkas (GRE)

=== Group B ===
Team	Pld	W	L	PF	PA	PD	Pts	Tie
Russia	3	2	1	210	191	+19	5	1–1, +18
Spain	3	2	1	231	229	+2	5	1–1, −7
Slovenia	3	2	1	204	209	−5	5	1–1, −11
Hungary	3	0	3	213	229	−16	3	

21 June
18:00

Boxscore

Slovenia	47–68	Russia
Scoring by half: 22–30, 25–38
Pts: Smodiš 19; Rebs: Smodiš 7 Asts: Daneu 4		Pts: Panov 14; Rebs: Panov 9 Asts: Kudelin 5

Clermont-Ferrand Sports Hall, Clermont-Ferrand
Attendance: 3,000
Referees: Danko Radić (CRO), Recep Ankaralı (TUR)

21 June
20:45

Boxscore

Hungary	75–84	Spain
Scoring by half: 36–27, 39–57
Pts: Gulyás 23; Rebs: Gulyás 4 Asts: Boros 5		Pts: Herreros 25; Rebs: Reyes 14; Asts: Corrales 4

Palais des sports de Toulouse, Toulouse
Attendance: 3,200
Referees: Carl Jungebrand (FIN), Bruno Gasperin (FRA)

22 June
18:30

Boxscore

Russia	73–72	Hungary
Scoring by half: 35–30, 38–42
Pts: Kudelin 21; Rebs: Kisurin 7 Asts: Kudelin 4		Pts: Dávid, Gulyás 17; Rebs: Gulyás 11; Asts: Kálmán 5

Clermont-Ferrand Sports Hall, Clermont-Ferrand
Attendance: 3,500
Referees: Stefano Cazzaro (ITA), Bruno Gasperin (FRA)

22 June
20:45

Boxscore

Spain	75–85	Slovenia
Scoring by half: 43–50, 32–35
Pts: Herreros 29; Rebs: de Miguel 7 Asts: Corrales 3		Pts: Smodiš 27; Rebs: Smodiš 8 Asts: Bečirovič 6

Clermont-Ferrand Sports Hall, Clermont-Ferrand
Attendance: 3,500
Referees: Carl Jungebrand (FIN), Recep Ankaralı (TUR)

23 June
18:30

Boxscore

Hungary	66–72	Slovenia
Scoring by half: 33–40, 33–32
Pts: Sitku 21; Rebs: 3 Players 6 Asts: Kálmán 8		Pts: Milič 17; Rebs: Nesterovič 7 Asts: Daneu, Zdovc 6

Clermont-Ferrand Sports Hall, Clermont-Ferrand
Attendance: 4,300
Referees: Carl Jungebrand (FIN), Danko Radić (CRO)

23 June
20:45

Boxscore

Russia	69–72	Spain
Scoring by half: 30–39, 39–33
Pts: Petrenko 19; Rebs: Nosov 18; Asts: Kudelin, Panov 4		Pts: Herreros 20; Rebs: de la Fuente 6 Asts: Rodríguez 5

Clermont-Ferrand Sports Hall, Clermont-Ferrand
Referees: Stefano Cazzaro (ITA), Bruno Gasperin (FRA)

=== Group C ===
Team	Pld	W	L	PF	PA	PD	Pts	Tie
Turkey	3	2	1	188	169	+19	5	1–1, +4
Italy	3	2	1	196	190	+6	5	1–1, +1
Croatia	3	2	1	198	197	+1	5	1–1, −5
Bosnia and Herzegovina	3	0	3	160	186	−26	3	

21 June
18:00

Boxscore

Bosnia and Herzegovina	42–57	Turkey
Scoring by half: 21–24, 21–33
Pts: Lerić 11; Rebs: Alihodžić 7 Asts: Marković 3		Pts: Türkoğlu 14; Rebs: Beşok 15; Asts: Tunçeri 10

Jean Bunoz Sports Hall, Antibes
Attendance: 3,500
Referees: Miguel Angel Betancor (ESP), Ivan Zachara (CZE)

21 June
20:45

Boxscore

Croatia	70–68	Italy
Scoring by half: 29–48, 41–20
Pts: Kukoč 16; Rebs: Kukoč 8 Asts: Kukoč, Mulaomerović 4		Pts: Galanda 15; Rebs: Fučka 5 Asts: Myers 5

Jean Bunoz Sports Hall, Antibes
Attendance: 3,800
Referees: Reuven Virovnik (ISR), Petr Sudek (SVK)

22 June
18:30

Boxscore

Turkey	70–63	Croatia
Scoring by half: 27–34, 43–29
Pts: Türkoğlu 18; Rebs: Beşok 13; Asts: Tunçeri 5		Pts: Mršić 18; Rebs: Mršić 6 Asts: Mulaomerović 6

Jean Bunoz Sports Hall, Antibes
Attendance: 3,000
Referees: Petr Sudek (SVK), Miguel Angel Betancor (ESP)

22 June
20:45

Boxscore

Italy	64–59	Bosnia and Herzegovina
Scoring by half: 36–30, 28–29
Pts: Myers 22; Rebs: Marconato 8 Asts: Galanda, Meneghin 3		Pts: Marković 22; Rebs: Alihodžić 7 Asts: Firić, Marković 5

Jean Bunoz Sports Hall, Antibes
Attendance: 3,800
Referees: Reuven Virovnik (ISR), Igor Lebedev (RUS)

23 June
18:30

Boxscore

Bosnia and Herzegovina	59–65	Croatia
Scoring by half: 32–37, 27–28
Pts: Firić 23; Rebs: Mujezinović 10; Asts: Marković, Mirković 3		Pts: Mršić 14; Rebs: Kukoč 13; Asts: Kukoč 7

Jean Bunoz Sports Hall, Antibes
Attendance: 3,700
Referees: Reuven Virovnik (ISR), Ivan Zachara (CZE)

23 June
20:45

Boxscore

Italy	64–61	Turkey
Scoring by half: 33–34, 31–27
Pts: Myers 20; Rebs: Chiacig 6 Asts: Meneghin 4		Pts: Türkcan 13; Rebs: Beşok, Türkcan 6 Asts: Tunçeri 6

Jean Bunoz Sports Hall, Antibes
Attendance: 4,000
Referees: Miguel Angel Betancor (ESP), Petr Sudek (SVK)

=== Group D ===
Team	Pld	W	L	PF	PA	PD	Pts	Tie
Czech Republic	3	2	1	229	211	+18	5	1–1, +7
Germany	3	2	1	210	210	0	5	1–1, −1
Lithuania	3	2	1	228	216	+12	5	1–1, −6
Greece	3	0	3	194	224	−30	3	

21 June
18:00

Boxscore

Czech Republic	78–62	Lithuania
Scoring by half: 43–34, 35–28
Pts: Bartoň 24; Rebs: Okáč 8 Asts: Czudek 5		Pts: Štombergas 17; Rebs: Sabonis 7 Asts: 3 Players 3

Palais des Sports de Dijon, Dijon
Referees: Pascal Dorizon (FRA), Milivoje Jovčić (YUG)

21 June
20:45

Boxscore

Germany	59–58	Greece
Scoring by half: 26–23, 33–35
Pts: Nowitzki 21; Rebs: Nowitzki 5 Asts: Rödl 3		Pts: Sigalas 17; Rebs: 4 Players 5 Asts: Sigalas 4

Palais des Sports de Dijon, Dijon
Referees: Iztok Rems (SLO), Marjan Stojovski (MKD)

22 June
18:30

Boxscore

Lithuania	84–74	Germany
Scoring by half: 32–32, 52–42
Pts: Štombergas 24; Rebs: Sabonis 11; Asts: Maskoliūnas 8		Pts: Nowitzki 16; Rebs: Femerling 6 Asts: Rödl 5

Palais des Sports de Dijon, Dijon
Referees: Iztok Rems (SLO), Armand de Keyser (BEL)

22 June
20:45

Boxscore

Greece	72–83	Czech Republic
Scoring by half: 33–34, 39–49
Pts: Papanikolaou 21; Rebs: Giannoulis 8 Asts: Boudouris, Sigalas 4		Pts: Bartoň 26; Rebs: Bartoň 7 Asts: Welsch 4

Palais des Sports de Dijon, Dijon
Referees: Pascal Dorizon (FRA), Milivoje Jovčić (YUG)

23 June
18:30

Boxscore

Czech Republic	68–77	Germany
Scoring by half: 33–49, 35–28
Pts: Bartoň 17; Rebs: 3 Players 5 Asts: Bartoň, Treml 2		Pts: Nowitzki 23; Rebs: Okulaja 10; Asts: Bogojevič 5

Palais des Sports de Dijon, Dijon
Referees: Pascal Dorizon (FRA), Marjan Stojovski (MKD)

23 June
20:45

Boxscore

Greece	64–82	Lithuania
Scoring by half: 28–44, 36–38
Pts: Papanikolaou 21; Rebs: Kakiouzis 5 Asts: Boudouris 4		Pts: Karnišovas 20; Rebs: Sabonis 8 Asts: Jasikevičius 7

Palais des Sports de Dijon, Dijon
Referees: Iztok Rems (SLO), Armand de Keyser (BEL)

== Second round ==
Qualified for the quarterfinals

=== Group E ===
Team	Pld	W	L	PF	PA	PD	Pts	Tie
Yugoslavia	6	5	1	443	386	+57	11	1–0
France	6	5	1	414	384	+30	11	0–1
Russia	6	4	2	441	409	+32	10	
Spain	6	3	3	439	454	−15	9	
Israel	6	2	4	416	467	−51	8	1–0
Slovenia	6	2	4	405	421	−16	8	0–1

26 June
16:15

Boxscore

Spain	57–74	France
Scoring by half: 32-31, 25-43
Pts: Dueñas 15; Rebs: Dueñas 8 Asts: Corrales, Rodríguez 3		Pts: Rigaudeau 21; Rebs: Smith 5 Asts: Digbeu, Risacher 4

Palais des Sports de Pau, Pau
Attendance: 7,600
Referees: Carl Jungebrand (LTU), Recep Ankaralı (TUR)

26 June
18:30

Boxscore

Slovenia	66–71	Yugoslavia
Scoring by half: 33–29, 33–42
Pts: Zdovc 16; Rebs: Jurković 9 Asts: Daneu, Kraljević 3		Pts: Obradović 17; Rebs: Tomašević 10; Asts: Bodiroga 8

Palais des Sports de Pau, Pau
Attendance: 7,600
Referees: Carl Jungebrand (FIN), Peter Klingbiel (GER)

26 June
20:45

Boxscore

Russia	93–84 (OT)	Israel
Scoring by half: 41–43, 35–33 Overtime: 17–8
Pts: Ruslan Avleev, Karasev 21; Rebs: Panov 10; Asts: Karasev 6		Pts: Sheffer 26; Rebs: Sheffer 7 Asts: Shelef 5

Palais des Sports de Pau, Pau
Attendance: 7,600
Referees: Danko Radić (CRO), Stefano Cazzaro (ITA)

27 June
16:15

Boxscore

Yugoslavia	77–63	Spain
Scoring by half: 38–35, 39–28
Pts: Danilović 16; Rebs: Gurović 9 Asts: Divac 5		Pts: Reyes 18; Rebs: Reyes 9 Asts: Herreros, Reyes 2

Palais des Sports de Pau, Pau
Referees: Romualdas Brazauskas (LTU), Recep Ankaralı (TUR)

27 June
18:30

Boxscore

Israel	67–66	Slovenia
Scoring by half: 41–28, 26–38
Pts: Goodes 16; Rebs: Henefeld, Kattash 5 Asts: Sheffer 5		Pts: Zdovc 20; Rebs: Jurković 9 Asts: Jurković, Zdovc 4

Palais des Sports de Pau, Pau
Attendance: 7,500
Referees: Philippe Leemann (SUI), Ivan Zachara (CZE)

27 June
22:30

Boxscore

France	66–62	Russia
Scoring by half: 34–27, 32–35
Pts: Abdul-Wahad 14; Rebs: Rigaudeau, Weis 6 Asts: Rigaudeau 2		Pts: Kudelin 22; Rebs: Panov 10; Asts: Avleev 3

Palais des Sports de Pau, Pau
Attendance: 7,500
Referees: Carl Jungebrand (FIN), Stefano Cazzaro (ITA)

28 June
14:45

Boxscore

Spain	88–74	Israel
Scoring by half: 36–31, 52–43
Pts: Reyes 19; Rebs: Herreros, Reyes 7 Asts: de la Fuente 4		Pts: Sheffer 17; Rebs: Steinhauer 5 Asts: Goodes 4

Palais des Sports de Pau, Pau
Referees: Danko Radić (CRO), Stefano Cazzaro (ITA)

28 June
18:30

Boxscore

Russia	76–68	Yugoslavia
Scoring by half: 36–31, 40–37
Pts: Z. Pashutin 20; Rebs: 3 Players 4 Asts: E. Pashutin 10		Pts: Bodiroga 14; Rebs: Gurović 5 Asts: Bodiroga 5

Palais des Sports de Pau, Pau
Referees: Philippe Leemann (SUI), Peter Klingbiel (GER)

28 June
20:45

Boxscore

Slovenia	69–74	France
Scoring by half: 38–28, 31–46
Pts: Nesterovič 16; Rebs: Jurković, Nesterovič 9 Asts: 4 Players 2		Pts: Rigaudeau, Risacher 12; Rebs: Abdul-Wahad 12; Asts: Rigaudeau 6

Palais des Sports de Pau, Pau
Attendance: 7,600
Referees: Carl Jungebrand (FIN), Ivan Zachara (CZE)

=== Group F ===
Team	Pld	W	L	PF	PA	PD	Pts	Tie
Lithuania	6	5	1	467	401	+66	11	
Italy	6	4	2	427	385	+42	10	1–0
Turkey	6	4	2	377	371	+6	10	0–1
Germany	6	3	3	420	432	−12	9	1–0
Croatia	6	3	3	444	454	−10	9	0–1
Czech Republic	6	2	4	434	470	−36	8	

26 June
16:15

Boxscore

Lithuania	74–48	Turkey
Scoring by half: 35–29, 39–19
Pts: Karnišovas 19; Rebs: Karnišovas, Sabonis 10; Asts: Sabonis, Žukauskas 4		Pts: Sarıca 11; Rebs: Beşok 9 Asts: Beşok, Tunçeri 2

Antarès, Le Mans
Referees: Iztok Rems (SLO), Milivoje Jovčić (YUG)

26 June
18:30

Boxscore

Czech Republic	64–86	Croatia
Scoring by half: 29–45, 35–41
Pts: Novák 13; Rebs: Bartoň, Novák 5 Asts: Welsch 4		Pts: Kukoč 20; Rebs: Ružić 8 Asts: Kukoč 8

Antarès, Le Mans
Referees: Carl Jungebrand (FIN), Peter Klingbiel (GER)

26 June
20:45

Boxscore

Germany	53–74	Italy
Scoring by half: 25–37, 28–37
Pts: Tomic 13; Rebs: Arigbabu 6 Asts: Bogojevič 3		Pts: Myers 16; Rebs: Fučka, Marconato 6 Asts: Meneghin 4

Antarès, Le Mans
Referees: Miguel Angel Betancor (ESP), Igor Lebedev (RUS)

27 June
16:15

Boxscore

Croatia	75–91	Lithuania
Scoring by half: 42–50, 33–41
Pts: Kukoč 12; Rebs: Kukoč 3 Asts: Kukoč 7		Pts: Štombergas 17; Rebs: Sabonis 9 Asts: Štombergas 6

Antarès, Le Mans
Attendance: 6,000
Referees: Pascal Dorizon (FRA), Petr Sudek (SVK)

27 June
18:30

Boxscore

Turkey	63–55	Germany
Scoring by half: 31–29, 32–26
Pts: Beşok 14; Rebs: Türkcan 10; Asts: Türkcan 6		Pts: Femerling 19; Rebs: Okulaja, Femerling 4 Asts: Bogojevič 8

Antarès, Le Mans
Attendance: 6,000
Referees: Reuven Virovnik (ISR), Milivoje Jovčić (YUG)

27 June
22:30

Boxscore

Italy	95–68	Czech Republic
Scoring by half: 45–40, 50–28
Pts: Myers 22; Rebs: Marconato 4 Asts: Myers 7		Pts: Bartoň 14; Rebs: Bečka 8 Asts: Bartoň 4

Antarès, Le Mans
Attendance: 6,000
Referees: Iztok Rems (SLO), Armand de Keyser (BEL)

28 June
14:45

Boxscore

Germany	102–85	Croatia
Scoring by half: 50–49, 52–36
Pts: Tomic 32; Rebs: Okulaja 9 Asts: Bogojevič 12		Pts: Prkačin 15; Rebs: Ružić 4 Asts: Kukoč 8

Antarès, Le Mans
Attendance: 3,000
Referees: Pascal Dorizon (FRA), Armand de Keyser (BEL)

28 June
18:30

Boxscore

Czech Republic	73–78	Turkey
Scoring by half: 37–36, 36–42
Pts: Bartoň 20; Rebs: Bartoň 7 Asts: Czudek 4		Pts: Türkcan 17; Rebs: Beşok 8 Asts: Sarıca, Tunçeri 4

Antarès, Le Mans
Attendance: 4,000
Referees: Reuven Virovnik (ISR), Igor Lebedev (RUS)

28 June
20:45

Boxscore

Lithuania	74–62	Italy
Scoring by half: 39–35, 35–27
Pts: Sabonis 25; Rebs: Sabonis 13; Asts: Karnišovas, Maskoliūnas 6		Pts: Meneghin 16; Rebs: Galanda 5 Asts: De Pol 5

Antarès, Le Mans
Attendance: 4,000
Referees: Miguel Angel Betancor (ESP), Petr Sudek (SVK)

== Knockout stage ==
=== Championship bracket ===
Quarter-finals
1 July – 14:00
Russia	79
Italy	102
1 July – 16:15
Yugoslavia	78
Germany	68
1 July – 18:30
France	66
Turkey	63
1 July – 20:45
Spain	74
Lithuania	72

Semi-finals
2 July – 20:45
Italy	71
Yugoslavia	62
2 July – 18:30
France	63
Spain	70

Final
3 July – 18:00
Italy	64
Spain	56
Third place
3 July – 15:45
Yugoslavia	74
France	62

==== Quarterfinals ====
1 July
14:00

Boxscore

Russia	79–102	Italy
Scoring by half: 40–49, 39–53
Pts: Karasev 22; Rebs: Nosov 13; Asts: Karasev, Nosov 3		Pts: Myers 22; Rebs: Galanda 5 Asts: De Pol, Meneghin 5

Palais Omnisports de Paris-Bercy, Paris
Attendance: 8,000
Referees: Carl Jungebrand (FIN), Pascal Dorizon (FRA)

1 July
16:15

Boxscore

Yugoslavia	78–68	Germany
Scoring by half: 38–35, 40–33
Pts: Šćepanović 17; Rebs: Tomašević 7 Asts: Bodiroga 7		Pts: Femerling 13; Rebs: Nowitzki 5 Asts: Bogojevič 6

Palais Omnisports de Paris-Bercy, Paris
Attendance: 12,000
Referees: Romualdas Brazauskas (LTU), Recep Ankaralı (TUR)

1 July
18:30

Boxscore

France	66–63	Turkey
Scoring by half: 31–31, 35–32
Pts: Rigaudeau 18; Rebs: Bilba 8 Asts: 3 Players 2		Pts: Türkoğlu 17; Rebs: Beşok 8 Asts: Tunçeri 5

Palais Omnisports de Paris-Bercy, Paris
Attendance: 14,000
Referees: Reuven Virovnik (ISR), Iztok Rems (SLO)

1 July
22:30

Boxscore

Spain	74–72	Lithuania
Scoring by half: 34–31, 40–41
Pts: Herreros 28; Rebs: 3 Players 5 Asts: Rodríguez 5		Pts: Jasikevičius 22; Rebs: Žukauskas 6 Asts: Maskoliūnas 5

Palais Omnisports de Paris-Bercy, Paris
Attendance: 12,000
Referees: Stefano Cazzaro (ITA), Petr Sudek (SVK)

==== Semifinals ====
2 July
18:30

Boxscore

France	63–70	Spain
Scoring by half: 29–31, 34–39
Pts: Bilba 11; Rebs: Bilba, Gadou 4 Asts: Rigaudeau 4		Pts: Herreros 29; Rebs: Reyes 9 Asts: Rodríguez 6

Palais Omnisports de Paris-Bercy, Paris
Attendance: 14,000
Referees: Carl Jungebrand (FIN), Petr Sudek (SVK)

2 July
20:45

Boxscore

Italy	71–62	Yugoslavia
Scoring by half: 37–23, 34–39
Pts: Fučka 17; Rebs: Fučka, Galanda 5 Asts: Abbio, Myers 4		Pts: Bodiroga 17; Rebs: Bodiroga 13; Asts: 3 Players 2

Palais Omnisports de Paris-Bercy, Paris
Attendance: 13,000
Referees: Reuven Virovnik (ISR), Romualdas Brazauskas (LTU)

==== Third place ====
3 July
15:45

Boxscore

France	62–74	Yugoslavia
Scoring by half: 26–33, 36–41
Pts: Rigaudeau 16; Rebs: Bilba, Weis 6 Asts: 3 Players 2		Pts: Divac 19; Rebs: Lončar 7 Asts: Bodiroga 5

Palais Omnisports de Paris-Bercy, Paris
Attendance: 14,000
Referees: Miguel Angel Betancor (ESP), Stefano Cazzaro (ITA)

==== Final ====
3 July
18:00

Boxscore

Spain	56–64	Italy
Scoring by half: 24–32, 32–32
Pts: Corrales 15; Rebs: Dueñas 11; Asts: Corrales 6		Pts: Myers 18; Rebs: Fučka 10; Asts: Basile, Fučka 2

Palais Omnisports de Paris-Bercy, Paris
Attendance: 14,000
Referees: Iztok Rems (SLO), Pascal Dorizon (FRA)

=== 5th to 8th place ===
Classification round
2 July – 14:00
Russia	74
Germany	70
2 July – 16:15
Turkey	56
Lithuania	80

Fifth place
3 July – 13:30
Russia	72
Lithuania	103
Seventh place
3 July – 11:15
Germany	86
Turkey	67

2 July
14:00

Boxscore

Russia	74–70	Germany
Scoring by half: 40–24, 34–46
Pts: Kudelin 19; Rebs: Avleev 9 Asts: E. Pashutin 4		Pts: Nowitzki 15; Rebs: Nowitzki 4 Asts: Bogojevič, Tomic 5

Palais omnisports de Paris-Bercy, Paris
Referees: Iztok Rems (SLO), Philippe Leemann (SUI)

2 July
18:00

Boxscore

Turkey	56–80	Lithuania
Scoring by half: 24–38, 32–42
Pts: Okur 14; Rebs: Okur 10; Asts: 4 Players 2		Pts: Praškevičius 16; Rebs: Karnišovas, Sabonis 7 Asts: Karnišovas 6

Palais omnisports de Paris-Bercy, Paris
Referees: Miguel Angel Betancor (ESP), Pascal Dorizon (FRA)

3 July
11:15

Boxscore

Germany	86–67	Turkey
Scoring by half: 48–36, 38–31
Pts: Femerling 18; Rebs: Okulaja 7 Asts: Bogojevič 5		Pts: Türkoğlu 15; Rebs: Okur 11; Asts: Tunçeri 4

Palais omnisports de Paris-Bercy, Paris
Referees: Armand de Keyser (BEL), Milivoje Jovčić (YUG)

3 July
13:30

Boxscore

Russia	72–103	Lithuania
Scoring by half: 33–42, 39–61
Pts: Kudelin 23; Rebs: Nosov 7 Asts: 3 Players 2		Pts: Karnišovas 18; Rebs: Einikis, Masiulis 6 Asts: Marčiulionis 7

Palais omnisports de Paris-Bercy, Paris
Referees: Peter Klingbiel (GER), Recep Ankaralı (TUR)

== Statistical leaders ==
=== Individual Tournament Highs ===
Points

Pos.	Name	PPG
1	(Spain) Alberto Herreros	19.2
2	(Czech Republic) Luboš Bartoň	18.7
3	(Israel) Doron Sheffer	16.7
4	(Italy) Carlton Myers	16.3
4	(France) Antoine Rigaudeau	15.5
6	(Germany) Dirk Nowitzki	15.2
7	(Croatia) Toni Kukoč	14.5
8	(Lithuania) Artūras Karnišovas	14.2
8	(Russia) Vasily Karasev	14.2
10	(Federal Republic of Yugoslavia) Dejan Bodiroga	14.1

Rebounds

Pos.	Name	RPG
1	(Lithuania) Arvydas Sabonis	8.5
2	(Russia) Vitaly Nosov	7.9
3	(Turkey) Hüseyin Beşok	7.4
3	(Spain) Alfonso Reyes	7.2
5	(Slovenia) Ivica Jurković	6.5
6	(Croatia) Toni Kukoč	6.3
6	(Federal Republic of Yugoslavia) Dejan Bodiroga	6.2
8	(France) Jim Bilba	6.1
9	(Federal Republic of Yugoslavia) Dejan Tomašević	6.0
10	(Turkey) Mirsad Türkcan	5.8

Assists

Pos.	Name	APG
1	(Croatia) Toni Kukoč	6.3
2	(Germany) Vladimir Bogojević	5.2
3	(Croatia) Damir Mulaomerović	4.8
4	(Turkey) Kerem Tunçeri	4.6
5	(Federal Republic of Yugoslavia) Dejan Bodiroga	4.3
6	(Lithuania) Darius Maskoliūnas	4.1
7	(Lithuania) Šarūnas Jasikevičius	3.5
8	(Russia) Evgeniy Pashutin	3.4
9	(Lithuania) Artūras Karnišovas	3.3
9	(Italy) Carlton Myers	3.3
9	(Slovenia) Jaka Daneu	3.3

Steals

Pos.	Name	SPG
1	(Czech Republic) Luboš Bartoň	2.0
2	(Russia) Evgeniy Pashutin	1.9
3	(Germany) Vladimir Bogojević	1.8
4	(Italy) Andrea Meneghin	1.7
4	(Russia) Sergei Panov	1.7
4	(Croatia) Toni Kukoč	1.7
7	(France) Jim Bilba	1.6
7	(Federal Republic of Yugoslavia) Saša Obradović	1.6
9	(Russia) Igor Kudelin	1.4
9	(Germany) Kai Nürnberger	1.4
9	(France) Tariq Abdul-Wahad	1.4

Minutes

Pos.	Name	MPG
1	(Slovenia) Jure Zdovc	36.8
2	(Turkey) Kerem Tunçeri	35.7
3	(Croatia) Toni Kukoč	34.3
4	(France) Antoine Rigaudeau	33.9
5	(France) Jim Bilba	33.3
6	(Israel) Nadav Henefeld	33.2
7	(Israel) Doron Sheffer	32.7
8	(Federal Republic of Yugoslavia) Dejan Bodiroga	31.8
9	(Spain) Alberto Herreros	31.7
10	(Germany) Dirk Nowitzki	31.3

=== Individual Game Highs ===
Department	Name	Total	Opponent
Points	(Germany) Dražan Tomić	32	Croatia
Rebounds	(Russia) Vitaliy Nosov	18	Spain
Assists	(Germany) Vladimir Bogojević	12	Croatia
Steals	(Russia) Sergei Panov	7	Slovenia
Turnovers	(Germany) Dirk Nowitzki	8	Turkey

=== Team Tournament Highs ===
Offensive PPG

Pos.	Name	PPG
1	Lithuania	80.2
2	Russia	74.0
2	Croatia	74.0
4	Italy	73.8
5	Yugoslavia	73.0

Rebounds

Pos.	Name	RPG
1	Lithuania	33.9
2	Russia	31.4
3	Spain	30.6
3	Turkey	30.6
5	Slovenia	29.6

Assists

Pos.	Name	APG
1	Lithuania	22.4
2	Hungary	19.7
3	Israel	17.0
4	Germany	16.3
5	Yugoslavia	15.7
5	Croatia	15.7

Steals

Pos.	Name	SPG
1	Russia	8.8
2	Italy	7.8
3	Czech Republic	7.3
3	Greece	7.3
5	France	7.2
5	Germany	7.2

=== Team Game highs ===
Department	Name	Total	Opponent
Points	Lithuania	103	Russia
Rebounds	Russia	45	Israel
Assists	Lithuania	32	Russia
Steals	Italy	17	Czech Republic
Field goal percentage	Lithuania	70.0% (35/50)	Croatia
3-point field goal percentage	France	69.2% (9/13)	Israel
Free throw percentage	Slovenia; Yugoslavia	100% (12/12); 100% (6/6)	Spain; Spain
Turnovers	Czech Republic	23	Italy

== Awards ==
1999 FIBA EuroBasket champions

Italy
2nd title

1999 FIBA EuroBasket MVP: Gregor Fučka ( Italy)

All-Tournament Team
(Italy) Carlton Myers
(Italy) Andrea Meneghin
(Spain) Alberto Herreros
(Federal Republic of Yugoslavia) Dejan Bodiroga
(Italy) Gregor Fučka (MVP)

== Final standings ==
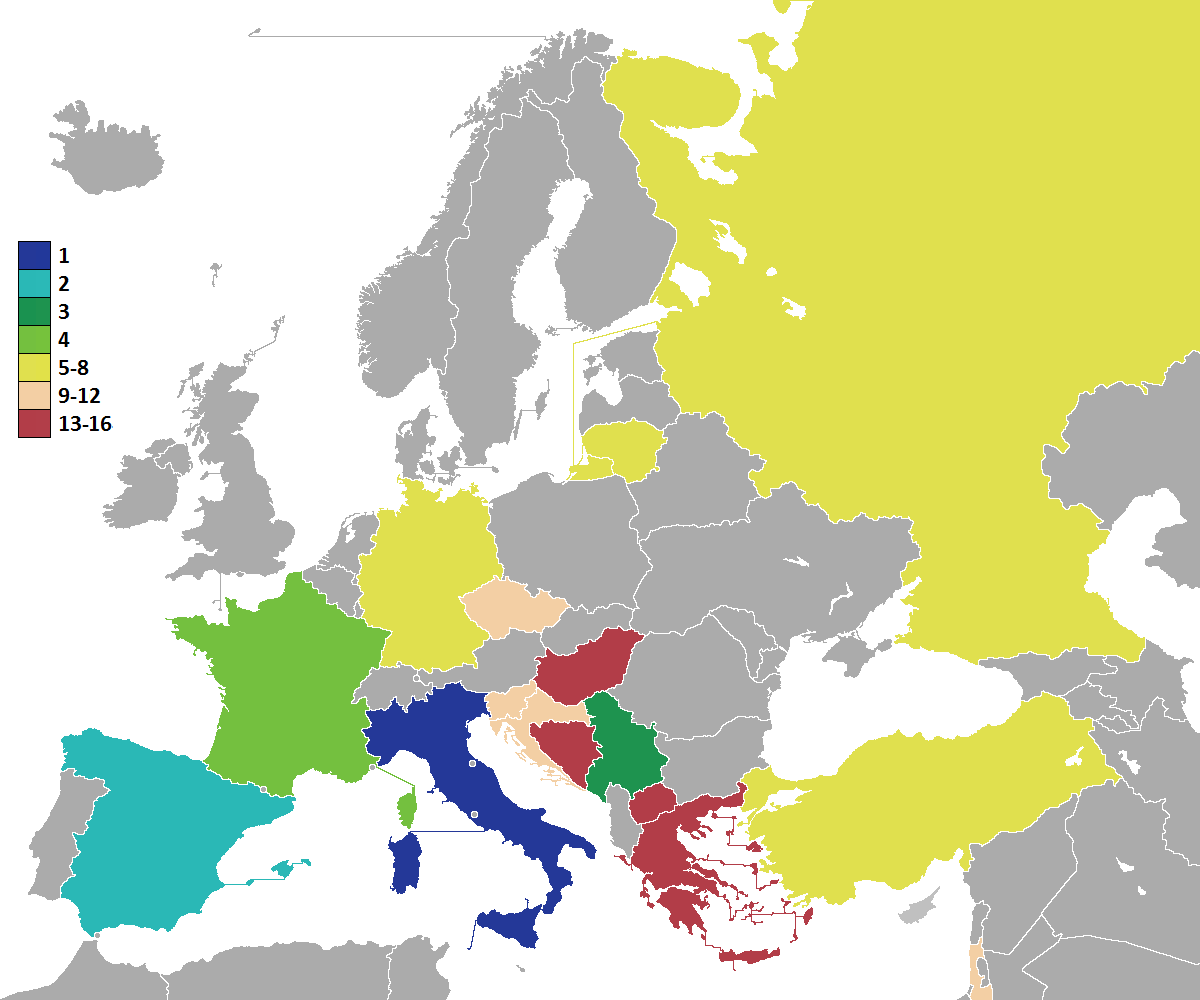
Results

Qualified for the 2000 Summer Olympics
Qualified for the 2000 Summer Olympics as current World Champion

Rank	Team	Record
1st place, gold medalist(s)	Italy	7–2
2nd place, silver medalist(s)	Spain	5–4
3rd place, bronze medalist(s)	Yugoslavia	7–2
4	France	6–3
5	Lithuania	7–2
6	Russia	5–4
7	Germany	4–5
8	Turkey	4–5
9	Israel	2–4
10	Slovenia	2–4
11	Croatia	3–3
12	Czech Republic	2–4
13	North Macedonia	0–3
14	Hungary	0–3
15	Bosnia and Herzegovina	0–3
16	Greece	0–3

1st	2nd	3rd	4th
Italy Davide Bonora; Gianluca Basile; Giacomo Galanda; Gregor Fučka; Denis Marconato; Alessandro De Pol; Carlton Myers; Andrea Meneghin; Alessandro Abbio; Michele Mian; Roberto Chiacig; Marcelo Damiao	Spain Alberto Angulo; Ignacio Rodilla; Iván Corrales; Ignacio Romero; Ignacio Rodríguez; Carlos Jiménez; Rodrigo de la Fuente; Alberto Herreros; Roger Esteller; Iñaki de Miguel; Alfonso Reyes; Roberto Dueñas	Yugoslavia Dejan Bodiroga; Predrag Danilović; Saša Obradović; Nikola Lončar; Milan Gurović; Vlado Šćepanović; Dragan Lukovski; Predrag Stojaković; Vlade Divac; Dragan Tarlać; Dejan Tomašević; Milenko Topić	France Moustapha Sonko; Alain Digbeu; Antoine Rigaudeau; Laurent Foirest; Laurent Sciarra; Tariq Abdul-Wahad; Stéphane Risacher; Thierry Gadou; Cyril Julian; Frédéric Weis; Jim Bilba; Ronnie Smith
