= Basketball at the 2000 Summer Olympics – Men's tournament =

Tournament details
- Host country: Australia
- City: Sydney
- Dates: 17 September – 1 October 2000
- Teams: 12 (from 5 confederations)
- Venues: 2 (in 1 host city)

Final positions
- Champions: United States (12th title)
- Runners-up: France
- Third place: Lithuania
- Fourth place: Australia

Tournament statistics
- Games played: 42
- Top scorer: (Australia) Andrew Gaze (19.9 points per game)

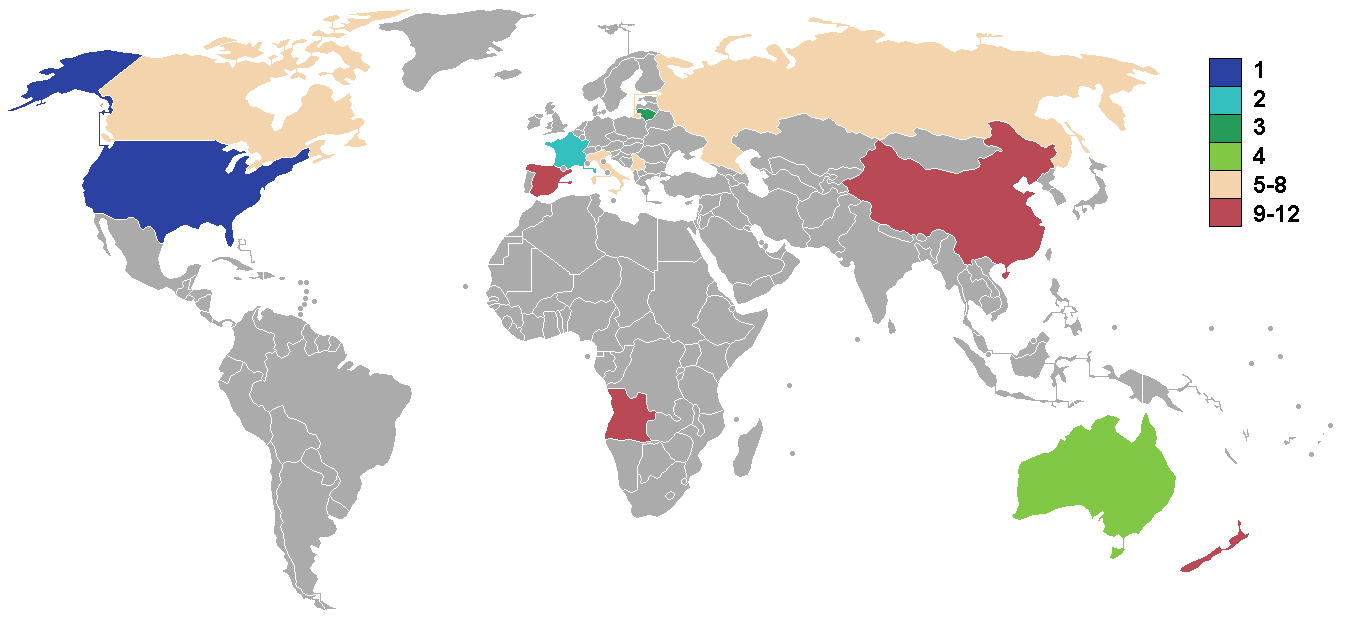
Competing teams.

The men's basketball tournament at the 2000 Summer Olympics in Sydney, began on 17 September and ended on 1 October, when the United States defeated France 85–75 for the gold medal. Preliminary round games were held at The Dome and elimination games at the Sydney SuperDome.

== Qualification ==
Country	Qualified as	Date of qualification	Previous appearance
Australia	Olympics host	Sep 24, 1993	1996
(Federal Republic of Yugoslavia) FR Yugoslavia	World champion	Aug 9, 1998	1996
China	Asian champion	Sep 5, 1999	1996
New Zealand	Oceanian champion	Oct 2, 1999	First appearance
Angola	African champion	Aug 6, 1999	1996
Canada	Americas runner-up	Jul 25, 1999	1988
United States	Americas champion	Jul 25, 1999	1996
Italy	European champion	Jul 3, 1999	1984
Spain	European runner-up	Jul 3, 1999	1992
France	European fourth place	Jul 3, 1999	1984
Lithuania	European fifth place	Jul 3, 1999	1996
Russia	European sixth place	Jul 3, 1999	1992

== Format ==
- Twelve teams are split into 2 preliminary round groups of 6 teams each. The top 4 teams from each group qualify for the knockout stage.
- Fifth and sixth-placed teams from each group are ranked 9th–12th in two additional matches.
- In the quarterfinals, the matchups are as follows: A1 vs. B4, A2 vs. B3, A3 vs. B2 and A4 vs. B1.
  - The eliminated teams at the quarterfinals are ranked 5th–8th in two additional matches.
- The winning teams from the quarterfinals meet in the semifinals as follows: A3/B2 vs. A1/B4 and A2/B3 vs. A4/B1.
- The winning teams from the semifinals dispute the gold medal. The losing teams dispute the bronze.

Ties are broken via the following the criteria, with the first option used first, all the way down to the last option:

1. Head to head results
2. Goal average (not the goal difference) between the tied teams
3. Goal average of the tied teams for all teams in its group

== Preliminary round ==
All times are local (UTC+11)

=== Group A ===
Pos	Team	Pld	W	L	PF	PA	PD	Pts	Qualification
1	United States	5	5	0	505	359	+146	10	Quarterfinals
2	Italy	5	3	2	332	349	−17	8 (Note: Head-to-head record: Italy 1–0 Lithuania)	Quarterfinals
3	Lithuania	5	3	2	372	339	+33	8 (Note: Head-to-head record: France 1-0 China)	Quarterfinals
4	France	5	2	3	372	374	−2	7	Quarterfinals
5	China	5	2	3	368	419	−51	7	9th place playoff
6	New Zealand	5	0	5	307	416	−109	5	11th place playoff

Source: FIBA archive
Rules for classification: 1) points; 2) head-to-head points; 3) head-to-head goal average; 4) head-to-head number of points scored.
Notes:

September 17
09:30

France	76–50	New Zealand
Scoring by half: 38–23, 38–27
Pts: Bonato 16; Rebs: Bilba, Rigaudeau 4 each Asts: Rigaudeau, Sonko 5 each		Pts: Marks 12; Rebs: Marks 7 Asts: Cameron 4

The Dome, Sydney
Attendance: 8,292

September 17
11:30

Italy	50–48	Lithuania
Scoring by half: 30–30, 20–18
Pts: Fučka 13; Rebs: Chiacig 5 Asts: Abbio 3		Pts: Štombergas 14; Rebs: Einikis 13; Asts: Jasikevičius 2

The Dome, Sydney
Attendance: 8,292

September 17
21:30

China	72–119	United States
Scoring by half: 38–60, 34–59
Pts: Wang 13; Rebs: Guo 5 Asts: Guo 6		Pts: Allen 21; Rebs: Garnett 8 Asts: Payton 7

The Dome, Sydney
Attendance: 8,319

September 19
11:30

New Zealand	60–75	China
Scoring by half: 30–40, 30–35
Pts: Dickel, Marks 13 each Rebs: Marks 9 Asts: Dickel 4		Pts: Wang 19; Rebs: Yao 8 Asts: Hu, Sun 4 each

The Dome, Sydney
Attendance: 8,357

September 19
16:30

United States	93–61	Italy
Scoring by half: 45–35, 48–26
Pts: Carter 13; Rebs: Garnett 9 Asts: Kidd 7		Pts: Myers 11; Rebs: Meneghin 6 Asts: Meneghin 4

The Dome, Sydney
Attendance: 8,368

September 19
19:30

Lithuania	81–63	France
Scoring by half: 50–35, 31–28
Pts: Einikis 19; Rebs: Einikis 6 Asts: Jasikevičius 6		Pts: Rigaudeau 13; Rebs: Bilba, Weis 5 each Asts: Rigaudeau, Risacher 3 each

The Dome, Sydney
Attendance: 8,406

September 21
9:30

Italy	78–66	New Zealand
Scoring by half: 32–36, 46–30
Pts: Myers 20; Rebs: Myers 6 Asts: Myers 4		Pts: Cameron 18; Rebs: Marks 7 Asts: Cameron 6

The Dome, Sydney
Attendance: 8,446

September 21
14:30

China	70–82	France
Scoring by half: 36–31, 34–51
Pts: Yao 14; Rebs: Wang 10; Asts: Guo 4		Pts: Rigaudeau 29; Rebs: Bilba, Julian 7 each Asts: Sciarra 6

The Dome, Sydney
Attendance: 8,391

September 21
16:30

United States	85–76	Lithuania
Scoring by half: 47–41, 38–35
Pts: Payton 14; Rebs: Garnett 11; Asts: 4 players, 2 each		Pts: Songaila 16; Rebs: Songaila 8 Asts: Jasikevičius 6

The Dome, Sydney
Attendance: 8,391

September 23
9:30

Lithuania	82–66	China
Scoring by half: 53–42, 29–24
Pts: Songaila 19; Rebs: Einikis 10; Asts: Jasikevičius 10		Pts: Yao 23; Rebs: Yao 7 Asts: Liu 2

The Dome, Sydney
Attendance: 8,365

September 23
19:30

New Zealand	56–102	United States
Scoring by half: 32–58, 24–44
Pts: Marks 10; Rebs: Marks 6 Asts: Henare 3		Pts: Carter 18; Rebs: Garnett 6 Asts: Kidd 6

The Dome, Sydney
Attendance: 8,392

September 23
21:30

France	57–67	Italy
Scoring by half: 28–30, 29–37
Pts: Sciarra 17; Rebs: Weis 8 Asts: Bilba 3		Pts: Myers 24; Rebs: Chiacig 7 Asts: Myers 4

The Dome, Sydney
Attendance: 8,392

September 25
11:30

New Zealand	75–85	Lithuania
Scoring by half: 33–36, 42–49
Pts: Marks 21; Rebs: Cameron 6 Asts: Cameron 4		Pts: Adomaitis 20; Rebs: Songaila 7 Asts: Maskoliūnas 7

The Dome, Sydney
Attendance: 8,435

September 25
14:30

Italy	76–85	China
Scoring by half: 40–42, 36–43
Pts: Abbio 15; Rebs: Fučka, Galanda 5 each Asts: Abbio, Basile 3 each		Pts: Li Nan 25; Rebs: Yao 6 Asts: Guo 7

The Dome, Sydney
Attendance: 8,477

September 25
16:30

France	94–106	United States
Scoring by half: 48–59, 46–47
Pts: Sciarra 21; Rebs: Bonato, Risacher 3 each Asts: Sciarra 4		Pts: McDyess 20; Rebs: Garnett, McDyess 11 each Asts: Kidd 6

The Dome, Sydney
Attendance: 8,477

=== Group B ===
Pos	Team	Pld	W	L	PF	PA	PD	Pts	Qualification
1	Canada	5	4	1	433	373	+60	9 (Note: Head-to-head record: Canada 1–0 FR Yugoslavia)	Quarterfinals
2	(Federal Republic of Yugoslavia) FR Yugoslavia	5	4	1	372	338	+34	9	Quarterfinals
3	Australia (H)	5	3	2	408	407	+1	8 (Note: Head-to-head record: Australia 1-0 Russia)	Quarterfinals
4	Russia	5	3	2	367	328	+39	8	Quarterfinals
5	Spain	5	1	4	349	376	−27	6	9th place playoff
6	Angola	5	0	5	303	410	−107	5	11th place playoff

Source: FIBA archive
Rules for classification: 1) points; 2) head-to-head points; 3) head-to-head goal average; 4) head-to-head number of points scored.
(H) Hosts
Notes:

September 17
14:30

FR Yugoslavia (Serbia and Montenegro)	66–60	Russia
Scoring by half: 27–28, 39–32
Pts: Rebrača 18; Rebs: Drobnjak 6 Asts: Lukovski, Obradović 3 each		Pts: Panov 13; Rebs: 3 players, 5 each Asts: 3 players, 2 each

The Dome, Sydney
Attendance: 8,353

September 17
16:30

Canada	101–90	Australia
Scoring by half: 48–51, 53–39
Pts: Meeks 27; Rebs: Nash 6 Asts: Nash 15		Pts: Gaze 24; Rebs: Bradtke, Longley 5 each Asts: Longley 7

The Dome, Sydney

September 17
19:30

Spain	64–45	Angola
Scoring by half: 30–22, 34–23
Pts: Dueñas 13; Rebs: Reyes 15; Asts: Reyes, Rodríguez 3 each		Pts: Muzadi 13; Rebs: Dias, E. Victoriano 7 each Asts: Lutonda 2

The Dome, Sydney

September 19
9:30

Canada	99–54	Angola
Scoring by half: 50–29, 49–25
Pts: Barrett 21; Rebs: Swords 7 Asts: Nash, Swords 5 each		Pts: de Carvalho 10; Rebs: A. Victoriano 7 Asts: Lutonda 3

The Dome, Sydney

September 19
14:30

Russia	71–63	Spain
Scoring by half: 38–28, 33–35
Pts: Chikalkin 23; Rebs: Kirilenko 9 Asts: E. Pashutin 5		Pts: Herreros 13; Rebs: Rogers 6 Asts: Herreros 2

The Dome, Sydney
Attendance: 8,368

September 19
21:30

Australia	66–80	(Federal Republic of Yugoslavia) FR Yugoslavia
Scoring by half: 28–45, 38–35
Pts: Gaze 21; Rebs: Longley 5 Asts: Heal 6		Pts: Bodiroga 19; Rebs: Tomašević 8 Asts: Bodiroga 6

The Dome, Sydney
Attendance: 8,406

September 21
11:30

Canada	91–77	Spain
Scoring by half: 53–34, 38–43
Pts: Meeks 24; Rebs: Guarasci 6 Asts: Nash 5		Pts: Rogers 15; Rebs: De la Fuente, Garbajosa 6 each Asts: López 4

The Dome, Sydney
Attendance: 8,446

September 21
19:30

FR Yugoslavia (Federal Republic of Yugoslavia)	73–64	Angola
Scoring by half: 39–32, 34–32
Pts: Tomašević 17; Rebs: Tomašević 11; Asts: Lukovski 4		Pts: Chipongue 15; Rebs: Lutonda 6 Asts: Lutonda 6

The Dome, Sydney
Attendance: 8,391

September 21
21:30

Australia	75–71	Russia
Scoring by half: 47–30, 28–41
Pts: Gaze, Heal 15 each Rebs: Mackinnon 8 Asts: Longley, Mackinnon 5 each		Pts: Fetisov 16; Rebs: 5 players, 5 each Asts: E. Pashutin 7

The Dome, Sydney
Attendance: 8,322

September 23
11:30

Spain	65–78	(Federal Republic of Yugoslavia) FR Yugoslavia
Scoring by half: 30–32, 35–46
Pts: Herreros 16; Rebs: Dueñas 10; Asts: López, Rodríguez 3 each		Pts: Danilović 14; Rebs: Rebrača 6 Asts: Danilović 4

The Dome, Sydney
Attendance: 8,365

September 23
14:30

Russia	77–59	Canada
Scoring by half: 45–36, 32–23
Pts: Fetisov 15; Rebs: E. Pashutin 7 Asts: E. Pashutin 11		Pts: Nash 15; Rebs: 3 players, 5 each Asts: Nash 4

The Dome, Sydney
Attendance: 8,446

September 23
16:30

Angola	75–86	Australia
Scoring by half: 43–41, 32–45
Pts: Dias 18; Rebs: Lutonda 7 Asts: 3 players, 3 each		Pts: Gaze 18; Rebs: Bradtke 7 Asts: Mackinnon 6

The Dome, Sydney
Attendance: 8,446

September 25
9:30

Angola	65–88	Russia
Scoring by half: 35–45, 30–43
Pts: Dias 14; Rebs: Dias 6 Asts: E. Victoriano 3		Pts: Morgunov 17; Rebs: Kirilenko 9 Asts: Bazarevich, E. Pashutin 5 each

The Dome, Sydney
Attendance: 8,435

September 25
19:30

FR Yugoslavia (Federal Republic of Yugoslavia)	75–83	Canada
Scoring by half: 42–33, 33–50
Pts: Danilović 20; Rebs: Tarlać, Tomašević 7 each Asts: Lukovski 4		Pts: Nash 26; Rebs: Nash 8 Asts: Nash 8

The Dome, Sydney
Attendance: 8,398

September 25
21:30

Australia	91–80	Spain
Scoring by half: 36–40, 55–40
Pts: Heal 26; Rebs: Bradtke 8 Asts: Mackinnon 6		Pts: Herreros 24; Rebs: 8 players, 2 each Asts: Rodríguez 7

The Dome, Sydney
Attendance: 8,398

== Tournament bracket ==
Quarterfinals
A1	United States	85
B4	Russia	70
B2	(Federal Republic of Yugoslavia) FR Yugoslavia	63
A3	Lithuania	76
A2	Italy	62
B3	Australia	65
B1	Canada	63
A4	France	68

Semifinals
A1	United States	85
A3	Lithuania	83
B3	Australia	52
A4	France	76

Gold-medal game
A1	United States	85
A4	France	75
Bronze-medal game
A3	Lithuania	89
B3	Australia	71

== Quarterfinals ==
September 28
15:00

Italy	62–65	Australia
Scoring by half: 27–31, 35–34
Pts: Fučka 17; Rebs: 3 players, 4 each Asts: Fučka 3		Pts: Gaze 27; Rebs: Bradtke 8 Asts: Gaze 4

Sydney SuperDome, Sydney
Attendance: 14,411
Referees: David Jones (United States)
Pascal Dorizon (France)

September 28
17:00

Canada	63–68	France
Scoring by half: 23–38, 40–30
Pts: MacCulloch 23; Rebs: MacCulloch 9 Asts: Nash 8		Pts: Sciarra 17; Rebs: Sciarra 7 Asts: Rigaudeau 4

Sydney SuperDome, Sydney
Attendance: 14,411
Referees: Romualdas Brazauskas (Lithuania)
Juan Figueroa (Puerto Rico)

September 28
20:00

FR Yugoslavia (Federal Republic of Yugoslavia)	63–76	Lithuania
Scoring by half: 32–37, 31–39
Pts: Stojaković 20; Rebs: Tomašević 8 Asts: Tomašević 2		Pts: Einikis 26; Rebs: Einikis 8 Asts: Jasikevičius 4

Sydney SuperDome, Sydney
Attendance: 14,260
Referees: Nikolaos Pitsilkas (Greece)
Renato Santos (Brazil)

September 28
22:00

United States	85–70	Russia
Scoring by half: 46–41, 39–29
Pts: Garnett 16; Rebs: Garnett 11; Asts: Kidd 8		Pts: Bashminov 12; Rebs: Morgunov 6 Asts: E. Pashutin 6

Sydney SuperDome, Sydney
Attendance: 14,260
Referees: Iztok Rems (Slovenia)
Rick Degagne (Canada)

== Semifinals ==
September 29
19:30

Australia	52–76	France
Scoring by half: 29–44, 23–32
Pts: Gaze, Heal 10 each Rebs: Bradtke 5 Asts: Heal 5		Pts: Sciarra 16; Rebs: Weis 9 Asts: Sciarra 7

Sydney SuperDome, Sydney
Attendance: 14,653
Referees: Nikolaos Pitsilkas (Greece)
Raul Chaves (Argentina)

September 29
21:30

Lithuania	83–85	United States
Scoring by half: 36–48, 47–37
Pts: Jasikevičius 27; Rebs: Štombergas, Žukauskas 5 each Asts: Jasikevičius 4		Pts: Carter 18; Rebs: Garnett 14; Asts: Garnett 4

Sydney SuperDome, Sydney
Attendance: 14,653
Referees: Tiziano Zancanella (Italy)
Pascal Dorizon (France)

== Finals ==
October 1
11:00

Australia	71–89	Lithuania
Scoring by half: 35–51, 36–38
Pts: Gaze 22; Rebs: Mackinnon 7 Asts: Heal 4		Pts: Štombergas 28; Rebs: Songaila 7 Asts: Jasikevičius 6

Sydney SuperDome, Sydney
Attendance: 14,833
Referees: Iztok Rems (Slovenia)
David Jones (United States)

October 1
13:15

France	75–85	United States
Scoring by half: 32–46, 43–39
Pts: Sciarra 19; Rebs: Sciarra 4 Asts: Sciarra 4		Pts: Allen, Carter 13 each Rebs: Kidd, Mourning 7 each Asts: Payton 3

Sydney SuperDome, Sydney
Attendance: 14,833
Referees: Romualdas Brazauskas (Lithuania)
Renato Santos (Brazil)

== Classification round ==
September 26
14:30

11th place

New Zealand	70–60	Angola
Scoring by half: 37–26, 33–34
Pts: Penney 17; Rebs: Marks 11; Asts: Jones 3		Pts: Almeida 19; Rebs: Dias 5 Asts: Lutonda 3

The Dome, Sydney
Attendance: 8,395

September 26
16:30

9th place

Spain	84–64	China
Scoring by half: 46–26, 38–38
Pts: Navarro 19; Rebs: Dueñas 10; Asts: Navarro, López 3 each		Pts: Wang 14; Rebs: Yao 6 Asts: Guo 4

The Dome, Sydney
Attendance: 8,395

September 30
12:00

7th place

Canada	86–83 (OT)	Russia
Scoring by half: 36–43, 33–26 Overtime: 17–14
Pts: Guarasci 21; Rebs: Meeks 10; Asts: Hamilton 5		Pts: Z. Pashutin 23; Rebs: Z. Pashutin 8 Asts: Z. Pashutin 5

Sydney SuperDome, Sydney
Attendance: 14,604

September 30
14:00

5th place

Italy	69–59	(Federal Republic of Yugoslavia) FR Yugoslavia
Scoring by half: 33–31, 36–28
Pts: Fučka 17; Rebs: Meneghin 9 Asts: Basile 5		Pts: Tomašević 13; Rebs: Stojaković 6 Asts: 7 players, 1 each

Sydney SuperDome, Sydney
Attendance: 14,604

== Awards ==
2000 Olympic Basketball Champions

United States
Twelfth title

== Statistical leaders ==
Top ten in points, rebounds and assists, and top 5 in steals and blocks.

=== Points ===
Name	PPG
(Australia) Andrew Gaze	19.9
(Australia) Shane Heal	14.9
(United States) Vince Carter	14.8
(Canada) Michael Meeks	14.3
(Italy) Carlton Myers	14.3
(Lithuania) Šarūnas Jasikevičius	14.0
(Canada) Steve Nash	13.7
(China) Wang Zhizhi	13.5
(Canada) Todd MacCulloch	13.0
(New Zealand) Sean Marks	13.0

=== Rebounds ===
Name	RPG
(United States) Kevin Garnett	9.1
(New Zealand) Sean Marks	7.3
(Federal Republic of Yugoslavia) Dejan Tomašević	6.9
(Lithuania) Gintaras Einikis	6.3
(Spain) Roberto Dueñas	6.2
(China) Yao Ming	6.0
(Australia) Mark Bradtke	5.9
(United States) Antonio McDyess	5.9
(United States) Jason Kidd	5.3
(Canada) Todd MacCulloch	5.1

=== Assists ===
Name	APG
(Canada) Steve Nash	6.9
(Russia) Evgeniy Pashutin	5.6
(Lithuania) Šarūnas Jasikevičius	5.1
(United States) Jason Kidd	4.4
(China) Guo Shiqiang	4.2
(Australia) Shane Heal	3.8
(France) Laurent Sciarra	3.6
(United States) Gary Payton	3.4
(Spain) Ignacio Rodríguez	3.2
(Australia) Luc Longley	2.9

=== Steals ===
Name	SPG
(Russia) Andrei Kirilenko	2.1
(New Zealand) Pero Cameron	1.7
(Spain) Ignacio Rodríguez	1.5
(France) Laurent Sciarra	1.4
(Spain) Carlos Jiménez	1.4

=== Blocks ===
Name	BPG
(United States) Alonzo Mourning	2.3
(China) Yao Ming	2.2
(Russia) Andrei Fetisov	2.0
(Russia) Andrei Kirilenko	1.9
(France) Frédéric Weis	1.8

=== Game highs ===
Department	Name	Total	Opponent
Points	(France) Antoine Rigaudeau (Lithuania) Saulius Štombergas	29	China; Australia
Rebounds	(Spain) Alfonso Reyes	15	Angola
Assists	(Canada) Steve Nash	15	Australia
Steals	(France) Jim Bilba (New Zealand) Pero Cameron (United States) Vince Carter (Russia) Andrei Kirilenko (France) Laurent Sciarra	4	China; Lithuania; France; Angola; China
Blocks	(United States) Alonzo Mourning	6	Italy
Turnovers	(Canada) Steve Nash	9	France

== Final standings ==
Rank	Team	Pld	W	L	PF	PA	PD
1st place, gold medalist(s)	United States	8	8	0	760	587	+173
2nd place, silver medalist(s)	France	8	4	4	591	574	+17
3rd place, bronze medalist(s)	Lithuania	8	5	3	620	558	+62
4th	Australia	8	4	4	596	634	−38
Eliminated at the quarterfinals
5th	Italy	7	4	3	463	473	−10
6th	(Federal Republic of Yugoslavia) FR Yugoslavia	7	4	3	494	483	+11
7th	Canada	7	5	2	582	524	+58
8th	Russia	7	3	4	520	499	+21
Preliminary round 5th placers
9th	Spain	6	2	4	433	440	−7
10th	China	6	2	4	432	503	−71
Preliminary round 6th placers
11th	New Zealand	6	1	5	377	476	−99
12th	Angola	6	0	6	363	480	−117

== See also ==
- Women's Tournament
