= Jean Bunoz Sports Hall =

Demolished arena in Antibes, France

- Jean-Bunoz
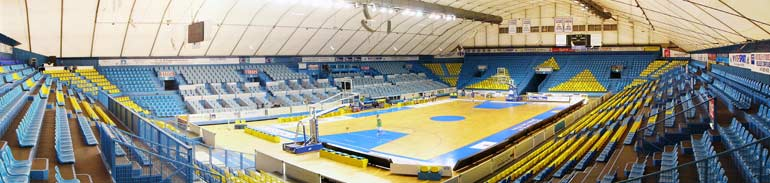
- Interactive map of Jean Bunoz Sports Hall
- Address: 300, avenue Jules-Grec 06600
- Location: Antibes, France
- Coordinates: 43.5900°N 7.1183°E
- Owner: Antibes
- Capacity: Basketball: 5,051

Construction
- Built: 1991
- Opened: 5 December 1991
- Renovated: 2006
- Closed: 2009
- Demolished: 2009

Tenant
- Olympique Antibes (1991–2009)

The Jean Bunoz Sports Hall was an indoor arena that was located in Antibes, France. The arena was primarily used to host basketball games, however it could also be used to host numerous other events, such as: acrobatic gymnastics, boxing, circus performances, competitive dance, concerts, ice skating, martial arts, trampolining, and World Squash. For basketball games, it had a seating capacity of 5,051 people.

== History ==
The Jean Bunoz Sports Hall opened in 1991. It was used as the home venue of the French professional basketball club Olympique Antibes. The arena also serves as one of the venues of the 1999 FIBA EuroBasket. The arena was demolished in 2009.
