= Iñaki de Miguel =

Spanish basketball player (born 1973)

Ignacio de Miguel Villa
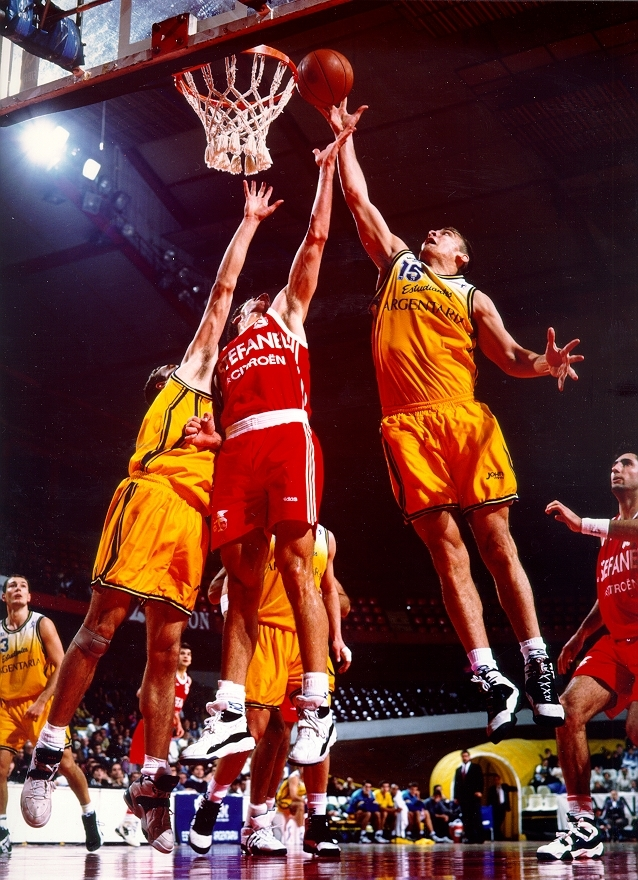
- Iñaki de Miguel (right, no. 15), playing for Estudiantes.

Personal information
- Born: 24 October 1973 (age 53) Madrid, Spain
- Listed height: 6 ft 8.75 in (2.05 m)
- Listed weight: 245 lb (111 kg)

Career information
- Playing career: 1992–2012
- Position: Power forward / center

Career history
- 1992–1999: Estudiantes
- 1999–2003: Olympiacos
- 2003–2006: Meridiano Alicante
- 2006–2007: Unicaja Málaga
- 2007–2009: Cajasol Sevilla
- 2009–2011: Real Madrid B
- 2011: Meridiano Alicante
- 2011–2012: Las Rozas

Career highlights
- FIBA EuroStar (2007); 2× Spanish League All-Star (1997, 1998); Greek Cup winner (2002); Greek League All-Star (2003)

Ignacio de Miguel Villa (born 24 October 1973) is a Spanish former professional basketball player, sought-after lecturer, keynote speaker, and philanthropist.

== Youth career ==
De Miguel played with the youth team of the Spanish basketball club Estudiantes Madrid.

== Professional career ==
During his pro basketball career, De Miguel played at the power forward and center positions. He was a Spanish League All-Star in 1997 and 1998. With the Greek club Olympiacos Piraeus, he won the Greek Cup title in 2002. He was also a FIBA EuroStar in 2007.

== National team career ==
De Miguel was a member of the senior men's Spanish national team. He played with Spain at the 1998 FIBA World Cup, the 1999 EuroBasket, the 2000 Summer Olympics, and the 2005 EuroBasket. De Miguel won the gold medal at the 1997 Mediterranean Games, and the silver medal at the 1999 EuroBasket.
