= Carlton Myers =

Italian basketball player

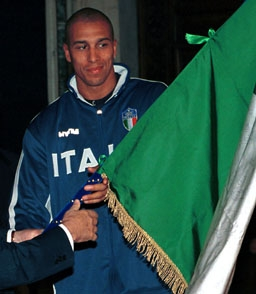
- Myers in 2000

Personal information
- Born: 30 March 1971 (age 55) London, England
- Listed height: 6 ft 3.75 in (1.92 m)
- Listed weight: 200 lb (91 kg)

Career information
- NBA draft: 1993: undrafted
- Playing career: 1988–2012
- Position: Shooting guard

Career history
- 1988–1992: Basket Rimini
- 1992–1994: Victoria Libertas Pesaro
- 1994–1995: Basket Rimini
- 1995–2001: Fortitudo Bologna
- 2001–2004: Virtus Roma
- 2004–2005: Montepaschi Siena
- 2005: Valladolid
- 2005–2009: Victoria Libertas Pesaro
- 2009–2010: Basket Rimini
- 2012: San Patrignano

Career highlights
- EuroLeague Top Scorer (1997); 3× FIBA EuroStar (1996, 1998, 1999); FIBA EuroStars MVP (1998); FIBA EuroStars 3-point Contest winner (1998); Italian League champion (2000); Italian Cup winner (1998); 2× Italian Supercup winner (1998, 2004); 2× Italian League MVP (1994, 1997); Italian League Top Scorer (1996); Italian Cup MVP (1998); Italian All-Star Game MVP (2005); Italian All-Star Game 3-point Contest winner (2012); Acropolis Tournament MVP (1997)

Carlton Ettore Francesco Myers (born 30 March 1971) is an Italian former professional basketball player who played in the Italian league and the EuroLeague. Myers was initially raised in the United Kingdom. One of the best European shooting guards of his generation, he won a FIBA EuroBasket title with the senior Italian national team in 1999.

== Early life ==
Myers was born in London, England to a Caribbean father from Saint Vincent and an Italian mother from Pesaro. He was raised in London until the age of 9, when he moved with his mother to Rimini, Italy.

== Professional career ==
During his years in Fortitudo Bologna, Myers became the great rival of another European superstar, Saša Danilović, the leader of Virtus Bologna, the other basketball team in the city. The duels and the rivalry between Myers and Danilović, are a legendary part of Italian basketball history.

== National team career ==
With the senior men's Italian National Team, Myers played in the 1997 and 1999 editions of the FIBA EuroBasket, the 1998 FIBA World Championship, and in the 2000 Sydney Summer Olympics, where he also had the honour of being his country's flag-bearer, at the opening ceremony.

== Awards and accomplishments ==
=== Club ===
- 2× Italian League MVP: 1994, 1997
- 3× FIBA EuroStar: 1996, 1998, 1999
- FIBA EuroLeague Top Scorer: 1997
- Italian Cup winner: 1998
- Italian Cup MVP: 1998
- 2× Italian Supercup winner: 1998, 2004
- FIBA EuroStars MVP: 1998
- FIBA EuroStars Top Scorer: 1998
- FIBA EuroStars 3-point Contest winner: 1998
- Italian League champion: 2000

=== National team ===
- Acropolis Tournament MVP: 1997
- 1997 FIBA EuroBasket: Silver
- 1999 FIBA EuroBasket: Gold
- 1999 FIBA EuroBasket: All-Tournament Team

Summer Olympics
Preceded by Giovanna Trillini	Flag bearer for Italy; 2000 Sydney	Succeeded by Jury Chechi
