= Andrea Meneghin =

Italian basketball player and coach

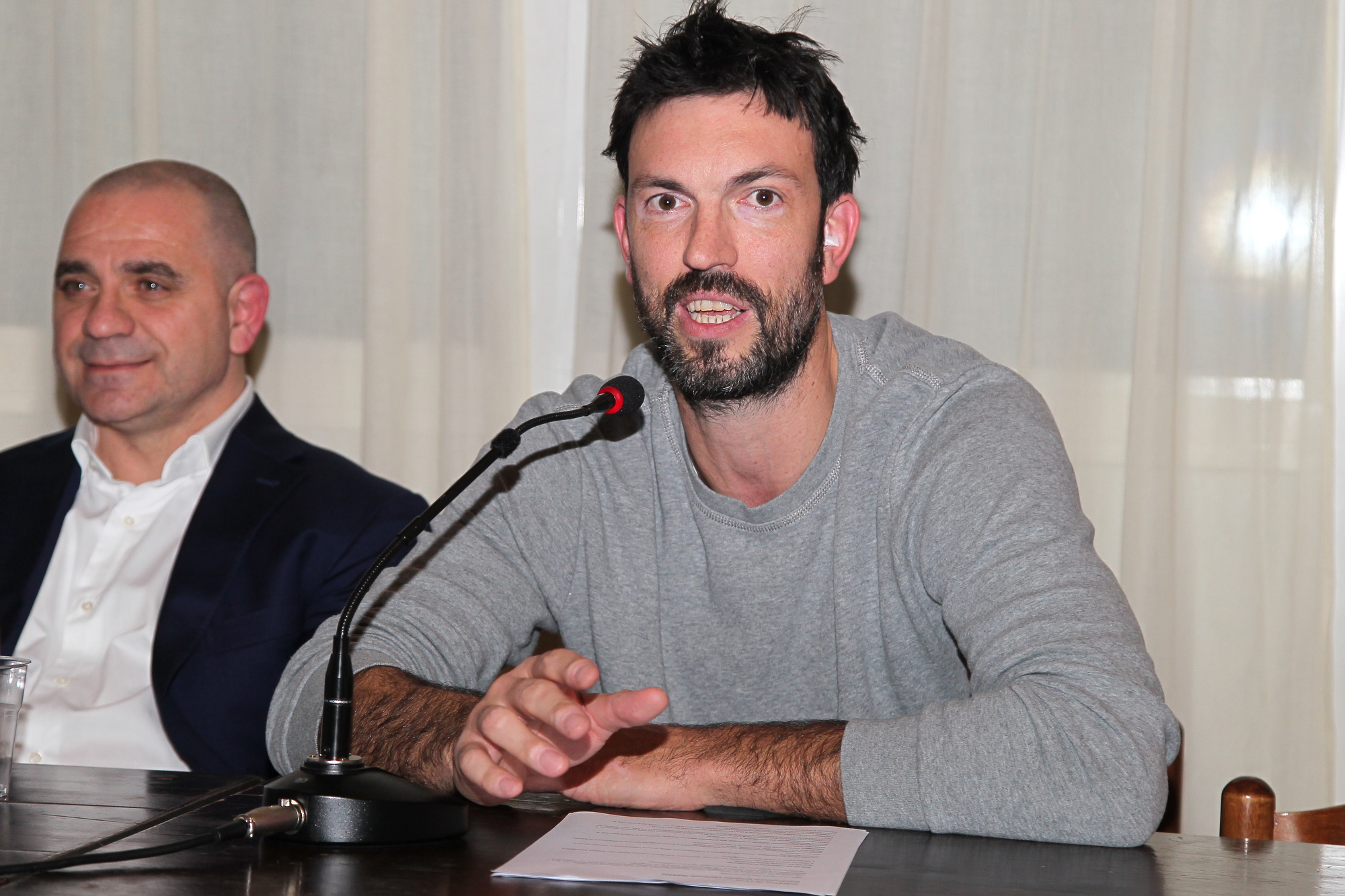
- Meneghin in 2015

Personal information
- Born: 20 February 1974 (age 52) Varese, Italy
- Listed height: 6 ft 6.75 in (2.00 m)
- Listed weight: 215 lb (98 kg)

Career information
- NBA draft: 1996: undrafted
- Playing career: 1990–2007
- Position: Shooting guard / small forward
- Coaching career: 2006–present

Career history

Playing
- 1990–2000: Pallacanestro Varese
- 2000–2002: Fortitudo Bologna
- 2002–2005: Pallacanestro Varese
- 2006–2007: Pallacanestro Daverio

Coaching
- 2006–2008: Pallacanestro Varese (assistant)
- 2007–present: Pallacanestro Varese (youth clubs)

Career highlights
- As player: Mr. Europa (1999); 2× FIBA EuroStar (1998, 1999); EuroLeague steals leader (2000); Italian League champion (1999); Italian Supercup winner (1999); Italian Supercup MVP (1999); Italian All-Star Game MVP (1999)

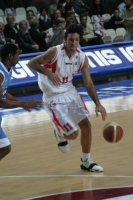
Meneghin, playing with Pallacanestro Varese.

Andrea Meneghin (born 20 February 1974) is an Italian retired professional basketball player and active coach. Standing at 2.00 m (6 ft. 6 3/4 in.), Meneghin was an offense oriented shooting guard-small forward.

== Professional career ==
Meneghin spent almost his whole career with Pallacanestro Varese. He played many seasons in the EuroLeague with Varese and Fortitudo Bologna. Meneghin helped Pallacanestro Varese win the Italian League championship in 1999, something that the team had not achieved since 1978. He was named the Mr. Europa European Player of the Year in 1999. He was also named the MVP of the Italian Supercup in 1999.

== National team career ==
Meneghin was selected to the EuroBasket 1999's All-Tournament Team, after he helped the senior Italian national team to win the gold medal at the tournament. He also played with Italy at the 1998 FIBA World Championship, the 2000 Summer Olympic Games, and the 2001 EuroBasket.

== Coaching career ==
Being considered an icon in Varese, Meneghin started his coaching career during the 2006–07 season, also with the Pallacanestro Varese basketball team.

== Personal life ==
Andrea Meneghin is the son of Dino Meneghin, one of the greatest Italian basketball players in history. Andrea played against his father, during the latter's last season as a pro.

== Awards and accomplishments ==
=== Pro career ===
- 2× FIBA EuroStar: (1998, 1999)
- Italian League Champion: (1999)
- Mr. Europa: (1999)
- Italian Supercup Winner: (1999)
- Italian Supercup MVP: (1999)
- Italian All-Star Game MVP: (1999)

=== Italian senior national team ===
- 1999 EuroBasket: Gold
- 1999 EuroBasket: All-Tournament Team
