= Dušan Bocevski =

Macedonian basketball player

Personal information
- Born: 5 November 1973 (age 53) Skopje, SR Macedonia, SFR Yugoslavia
- Listed height: 2.08 m (6 ft 10 in)

Career information
- Playing career: 1993–2008
- Position: Center

Career history
- 1993–1997: Rabotnički
- 1997–1998: Tikves
- 1998–1999: SV Oberelchingen
- 1999–2000: Hapoel Holon
- 2000: Cholet Basket
- 2001: Nikol Fert
- 2002: Zadar
- 2003–2004: Anwil Włocławek
- 2004–2005: Union Olimpija
- 2005–2006: Dynamo Moscow
- 2006–2007: Anwil Włocławek
- 2007–2008: SKS Starogard Gdański

Dušan Bocevski (born 5 November 1973) is a former Macedonian professional basketball player. He was also a member of the Macedonia national team.

== Achievements ==
KK Rabotnički

- Macedonian First League : 1993–1994, 1994–1995, 1995–1996, 1996–1997
- Macedonian Basketball Cup: 1994

Anwil Włocławek

- Polish Basketball League: 2002–2003

KK Olimpija

- Premier A Slovenian Basketball League: 2004–2005
- Slovenian Basketball Cup: 2005

== National team career ==
Dušan Bocevski was a member of the Macedonia national team that represented the country at the EuroBasket 1999.
