= Ivica Jurković =

Slovene basketball player (born 1973)

Personal information
- Born: 26 March 1973 (age 53) Čapljina, SR Bosnia and Herzegovina, Yugoslavia
- Listed height: 6 ft 9 in (2.06 m)

Career information
- Playing career: 1992–2012
- Position: Power forward

Career history
- 1990–1991: Iskra Stolac
- 1991–1992: Lokomotiva Mostar
- 1992–1996: Rogaška Donat
- 1996–1999: Union Olimpija
- 1999–2003: Türk Telekom
- 2003–2004: PAOK
- 2004–2005: Olympiacos
- 2005–2006: Lokomotiv Rostov
- 2006–2007: Union Olimpija
- 2007: Kaveh Tehran
- 2007–2008: Türk Telekom
- 2008: Union Olimpija
- 2009: Kordestan
- 2012: Šentjur

Career highlights
- 4x Slovenian League champion (1997, 1998, 1999, 2006); 3x Slovenian Cup winner (1997, 1998, 1999); Turkish Cup winner (2008)

Ivica Jurković (born March 26, 1973) is a Slovenian former professional basketball player.

== Professional career ==
Jurković played for Rogaška Donat, Union Olimpija, Türk Telekom, PAOK, Olympiacos, Lokomotiv Rostov, Kaveh Tehran, Kordestan and Šentjur.

== Slovenian national team ==
Jurković was a member of the Slovenia national basketball team since 1996 until 2004. He competed at Eurobasket 1997, Eurobasket 1999, Eurobasket 2001 and Eurobasket 2003. He represented Slovenia officially at 61 games and scored a 488 points.

== Career statistics ==
Legend
GP	Games played	GS	Games started	MPG	Minutes per game
FG%	Field-goal percentage	3P%	3-point field-goal percentage	FT%	Free-throw percentage
RPG	Rebounds per game	APG	Assists per game	SPG	Steals per game
BPG	Blocks per game	PPG	Points per game	PIR	Performance index rating
**Bold**	Career high

=== Euroleague ===
Year	Team	GP	GS	MPG	FG%	3P%	FT%	RPG	APG	SPG	BPG	PPG	PIR
2004–05	Olympiacos	10	**10**	**25.4**	.472	.148	.667	**4.8**	**.9**	1.0	**.3**	5.4	4.9
2006–07	Union Olimpija	**12**	5	22.2	**.639**	**.300**	.568	3.1	.6	**1.4**	.1	**9.3**	**7.2**
2008–09	Union Olimpija	4	0	11.6	.000	.286	**1.000**	1.8	.3	.3	**.3**	2.0	-1.0
