= Jaka Daneu =

Slovenian basketball player

Personal information
- Born: 3 February 1971 (age 55) Ljubljana, SR Slovenia, Yugoslavia
- Listed height: 6 ft 5 in (1.96 m)

Career information
- Playing career: 1988–2001
- Position: Point guard

Career history

Playing
- 1988–1999: Smelt / Union Olimpija
- 1999: Czarni Słupsk
- 2000–2001: Geoplin Slovan

Coaching
- 2010–2013: Union Olimpija (assistant)

Career highlights
- FIBA Saporta Cup winner (1994); 8x Slovenian League champion (1992–1999); 7x Slovenian Cup winner (1992–1995, 1997–1999)

Jaka Daneu (born February 3, 1971) is a Slovenian former professional basketball player.

== Professional career ==
Daneu played for Smelt Olimpija, Czarni Słupsk and Geoplin Slovan.

== Slovenian national team ==
Daneu was a member of the Slovenia national basketball team since 1992 where he competed at Eurobasket 1993, Eurobasket 1995, Eurobasket 1997 and Eurobasket 1999. He also represented Slovenia officially at 67 games. and scored a 362 points

== Personal life ==
During the COVID-19 pandemic he volunteered as a computer programmer for the national Sledilnik ("Tracker") effort tracking the statistics of the disease in Slovenia. In January 2022, he won the vote of the national Val 202 radio station's audience for the name of the week for his contribution.

He has two sons and a daughter who are all involved in basketball. His father is former basketball player Ivo Daneu and his son Žiga is also a basketball player.
