= Ruslan Avleev =

Russian basketball player (born 1976)

Personal information
- Born: June 4, 1976 (age 50) Sarapul, Udmurtia, Russian SFSR, Soviet Union
- Listed height: 6 ft 6 in (1.98 m)

Career information
- Playing career: 1995–present
- Position: Power forward

Career history
- 1995–1997: BK EVRAZ
- 1997–1998: CSKA Moscow
- 1998–2001: UNICS Kazan
- 2001–2002: Ural Great
- 2002–2003: Virtus Bologna
- 2003–2005: UNICS Kazan
- 2005–2006: MBC Dynamo Moscow
- 1999–2002: Russian National Team

Career highlights
- Russian Superleague A Champion (2002); Russian Superleague A Vice-champion (2005); Russian Superleague A Bronze Medalist (2001); Russian Cup winner (2004)
Medals
Men's basketball
Superleague A
Gold medal – first place	2002	Ural Great
Silver medal – second place	2005	UNICS Kazan
Bronze medal – third place	2001	UNICS Kazan
Russian Cup
Gold medal – first place	2004	Ural Great
International Competitions

Ruslan Avleev (born 4 June 1976 in Sarapul, Udmurtia) is a former Russian professional basketball 6'6" power forward of Tatar ethnicity. Started his career as a pro in 1995 with BK EVRAZ. Avleev had played in Russia (EVRAZ, CSKA, UNICS Kazan, Ural Great, and MBC Dynamo Moscow) and Italy (Virtus Bologna 2002-03).

Trophies (Superleague A):

- Champion – Ural Great (2002);
- Vice-champion – UNICS Kazan (2005);
- Bronze Medalist – UNICS Kazan (2001);
- Russian Cup winner – Ural Great (2004);

Russian National Team (1999–2002):

- 1999 FIBA EuroBasket;
- 2000 Olympic Games;
- 2002 FIBA World Championship;
