= Igor Kudelin =

Russian basketball player

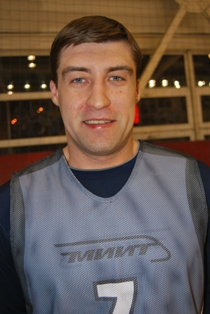
- Kudelin, in 2009.

Personal information
- Born: August 10, 1972 (age 54) Taganrog, Russian SFSR, Soviet Union
- Listed height: 1.96 m (6 ft 5 in)
- Listed weight: 195 lb (88 kg)

Career information
- NBA draft: 1994: undrafted
- Playing career: 1991–2009
- Position: Shooting guard / Small forward
- Number: 7

Career history

Playing
- 1991–2001: CSKA Moscow
- 2001–2002: Lokomotiv Mineralnye Vody
- 2002–2003: UNICS Kazan
- 2003–2006: Lokomotiv Rostov
- 2006: UNICS Kazan
- 2007: Prostějov
- 2008–2009: BC MIIT Moscow

Coaching
- 2018: Khimki Moscow Region II (Youth League)

Career highlights
- As a player: FIBA European Selection (1996); FIBA EuroStar (1999); North European League champion (2000); 9× Russian Super League champion (1992–2000); Russian Cup winner (2003); Russian Super League All-Star (1999); Medal of the Order For Merit to the Fatherland; Honored Master of Sports of Russia
Medals
Men's basketball
Representing Soviet Union
European U-18 Championship
Silver medal – second place	1990 Netherlands	U-18 Team
Representing Russia
FIBA World Cup
Silver medal – second place	1998 Greece
FIBA EuroBasket
Bronze medal – third place	1997 Spain

Igor Alexandrovich Kudelin (born August 10, 1972) is a Russian former professional basketball player and coach. At a height of 1.96m (6'5") tall, he played at the shooting guard and small forward positions.

== Professional career ==
Kudelin spent the majority of his professional club playing career with the Russian club CSKA Moscow. He helped CSKA Moscow make the Euroleague Final Four twice, first at the 1996 FIBA European League Final Four, and then later at the 2001 FIBA SuproLeague Final Four. He was a member of the FIBA European Selection Team in 1996, as well as a FIBA EuroStar in 1999.

With CSKA, he won 9 straight Russian Super League A championships. His best individual scoring games during his pro club career were 44 points scored in a Russian Basketball Super League A game against Dynamo Moscow in 1996, and 47 points scored in a Russian Super League A game against Tula Arsenal, in 2004.

== National team career ==
During his playing career, Kudelin was a regular member of the senior men's Russian national team. With Russia, he won a bronze medal at the 1997 FIBA EuroBasket. While representing Russia, he also won a silver medal at the 1998 FIBA World Championship.

Kudelin also competed with Russia at the 1995 FIBA EuroBasket, the 1998 Goodwill Games, the 1999 FIBA EuroBasket, the 2001 FIBA EuroBasket, and the 2002 FIBA World Cup.
