= Vladimir Bogojević =

Serbian-German basketball player and coach

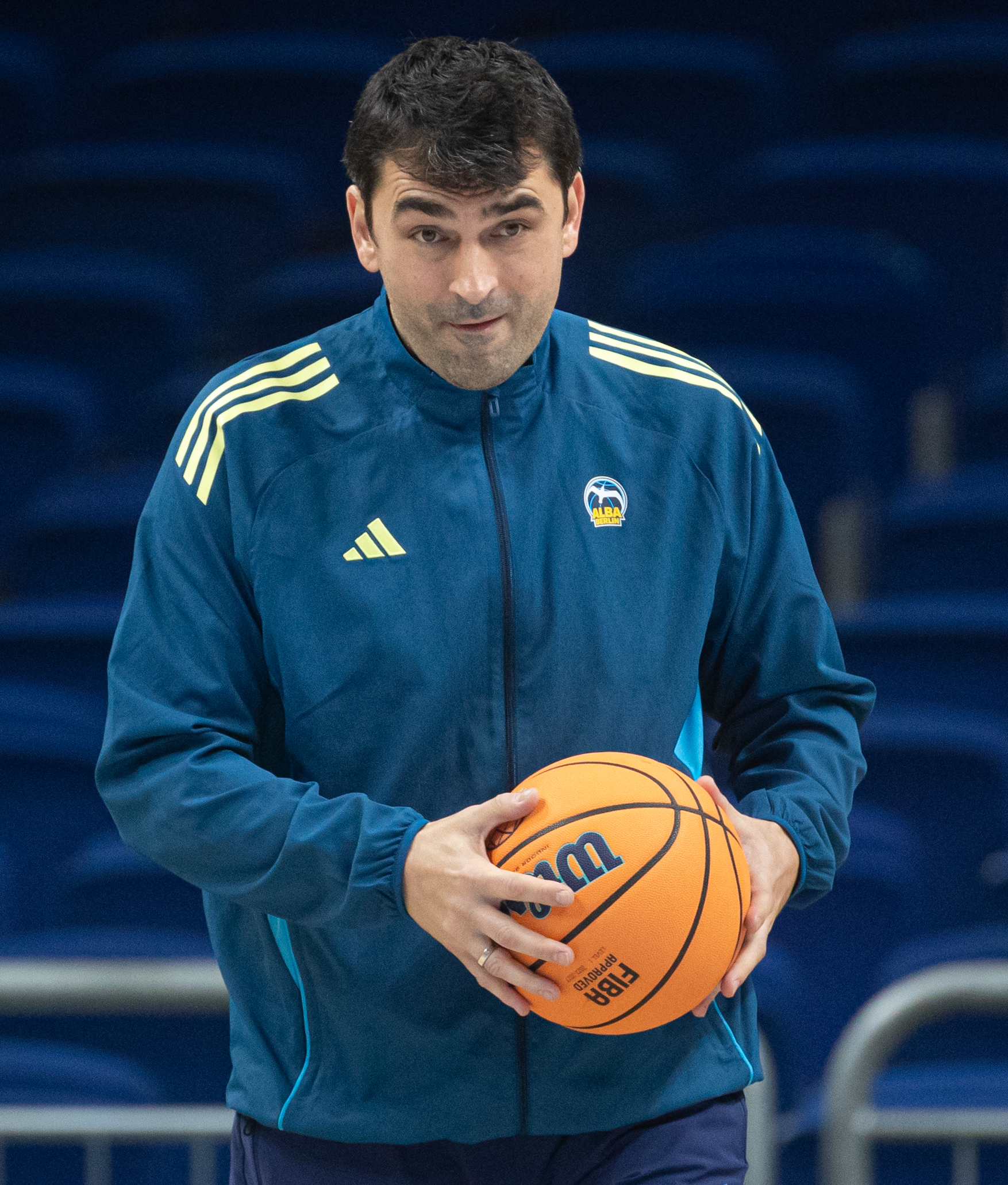
- Bogojević in 2025

Alba Berlin
- Title: Assistant coach
- League: BBL

Personal information
- Born: 20 April 1976 (age 50) Kraljevo, SFR Yugoslavia
- Listed height: 1.94 m (6 ft 4 1/2 in)
- Listed weight: 93 kg (205 lb)

Career information
- NBA draft: 1998: undrafted
- Playing career: 1993–2007
- Position: Shooting guard / point guard
- Number: 7, 4, 6
- Coaching career: 2007–present

Career history

Playing
- 1993–1997: Gießen Flippers
- 1997–2000: Alba Berlin
- 2000: Partizan
- 2000–2001: Caja San Fernando Sevilla
- 2001–2003: RheinEnergie Köln
- 2003: Sicilia Messina
- 2003–2004: RheinEnergie Köln
- 2004: Tenerife CB
- 2005: MENT Vassilakis
- 2005–2006: Prostějov
- 2006–2007: Düsseldorf Magics

Coaching
- 2007–2008: Kaiserslautern Braves
- 2009–2011: Gießen 46ers
- 2014–2016: Alba Berlin (assistant)

Career highlights
- As player: 3× German League champion (1998–2000); 2× German Cup winner (1999, 2004); Nike Hoop Summit (1996)

Vladimir Bogojević (Serbian Cyrillic: Владимир Богојевић, born 20 April 1976) is a Serbian-German professional basketball coach and former player. He represented Germany basketball team internationally.

== Early life ==
Bogojević was born in Kraljevo, SR Serbia, SFR Yugoslavia.

== Playing career ==
Bogojevič started his professional career at the Gießen Flippers. There he made his breakthrough and then moved to Alba Berlin. During his time in Berlin, he was also a member of the Germany basketball team and played in 57 international games. After Berlin, Bogojević had stints in Yugoslavia, Spain, Italy, Greece and the Czech Republic where he played for RheinEnergie Köln, Partizan Belgrade and Tenerife CB, among others. During his career as a guard, Bogojević was a member of three German League championship teams and two German Cup winning teams. In 2006, he returned to Germany and signed for the Düsseldorf Magics of the ProA league the 2006–07 season. In 2007, he ended his professional career.

== National team career ==
Bogojević was a member of the Germany national U22 team that competed at the 1998 European Championship for Men '22 and Under' in Trapani, Italy. Over eight tournament games, he averaged 8.0 points, 4.9 rebounds and 1.1 assists per game.

Bogojević was a member of the Germany national basketball team that competed at the 1997 FIBA European Championship in Spain. Over eight tournament games, he averaged 6.6 points, 1.9 rebounds and 1.4 assists per game. He was a member of the team that competed at the 1999 FIBA European Championship in France. Over nine tournament games, he averaged 6.6 points, 2.6 rebounds and 5.2 assists per game.

== Coaching career ==
Bogojević had coaching stints with the Kaiserslautern Braves and the Gießen 46ers.

== Career achievements and awards ==
As player

- German League champion: 3 (with Alba Berlin: 1997–98, 1998–99, 1999–2000)
- German Cup winner: 2 (with Alba Berlin: 1998–99; with RheinEnergie Köln: 2003–04)
