= Marcelo Dilglay Damiao =

Brazilian-Italian basketball player (born 1975)

Marcelo Damião
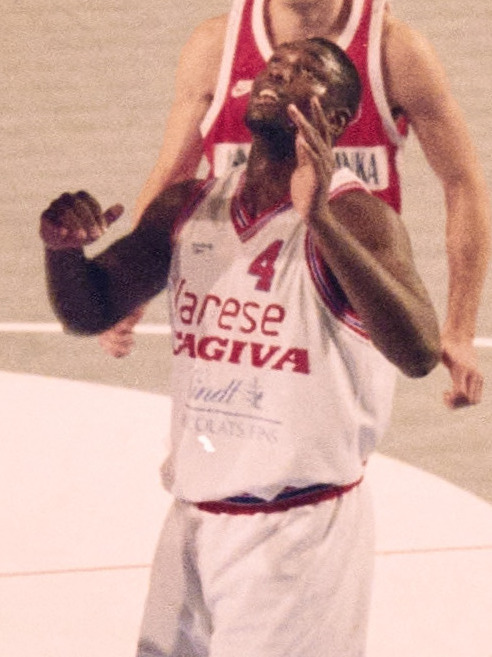
- Damiao with Varese in 1997

Personal information
- Born: 19 March 1975 (age 51) Campinas, Brazil
- Listed height: 6 ft 9 in (2.06 m)
- Listed weight: 260 lb (118 kg)

Career information
- NBA draft: 1997: undrafted
- Playing career: 1994–2008
- Position: Center

Career history
- 1994–1996: Fortitudo Bologna
- 1996–1997: Varese
- 1997–1998: Reggiana
- 1998–1999: Fortitudo Bologna
- 1999–2000: Reggiana
- 2000–2001: Fortitudo Bologna
- 2001–2003: Cantù
- 2003–2005: Reggiana
- 2005: Firenze
- 2006: Pavia
- 2006-2007: Latina
- 2007-2008: Scauri

Career highlights
- Italian Supercup (1998); Legadue champion (2004)
Medals
Representing Italy
Men's basketball
Mediterranean Games
Silver medal – second place	1997 Bari
EuroBasket
Gold medal – first place	1999 France

Dilglay Marcelo José Damião (born 19 March 1975 in Campinas, São Paulo, Brazil) is a Brazilian-Italian basketball player. A member of the Italian men's national team, Damiao competed with the squad at the 1998 FIBA World Championship, Eurobasket 1999 and the 2000 Summer Olympics.
