= Ignacio Rodríguez (basketball) =

Spanish basketball player (born 1970)

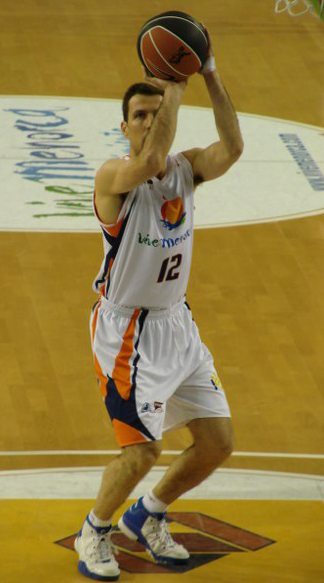
Rodriguez in 2007

Ignacio Pablo "Nacho" Rodríguez Marín (born 2 September 1970) is a former Spanish professional basketball player.

== Professional career ==
Born in Málaga, Rodríguez played most of his career with the teams Spanish professional Liga ACB teams Unicaja Málaga and FC Barcelona Bàsquet. During his time with FC Barcelona, he won the EuroLeague's 2002-03 season championship.

In the Liga ACB (the top-tier level Spanish League), he played 16,605 minutes (5th most) in 737 games (2nd most).

== Spain national team ==
Rodríguez also competed with the senior Spain national basketball team at the 2000 Summer Olympics, where the squad finished in ninth place.
