= Vitaly Nosov =

Russian basketball player

Medal record

Representing Russia

Men's basketball
Silver medal – second place	1994 Canada	Russia
Silver medal – second place	1998 Greece	Russia

Vitaly Yevgenyevich Nosov (Russian: Виталий Евгеньевич Носов; born 1 February 1968 in Moscow, USSR) is a retired Russian professional basketball player. He was part of the Russian squad that won the silver medal at the 1994 and 1998 FIBA World Championship.
