= Alessandro Abbio =

Italian basketball player (born 1971)

Personal information
- Born: 13 March 1971 Racconigi, Italy
- Listed height: 1.93 m (6 ft 4 in)
- Listed weight: 85 kg (187 lb)

Career information
- NBA draft: 1993: undrafted
- Playing career: 1988–2008
- Position: Shooting guard

Career history
- 1988–1994: Auxilium Torino
- 1994–2001: Virtus Bologna
- 2001–2004: Pamesa Valencia
- 2004–2005: CB Granada
- 2005–2006: Basket Livorno
- 2006–2008: Pallacanestro Firenze

Career highlights
- 2× EuroLeague champion (1998, 2001); FIBA EuroStar (1999); 3× Italian League champion (1995, 1998, 2001); 4× Italian Cup winner (1997, 1999, 2001, 2002); 5× Italian League All-Star (1996, 1997, 1998, 1999, 2001)
Medals
Men's basketball
Representing Italy
FIBA EuroBasket
Silver medal – second place	1997 Spain
Gold medal – first place	1999 France
Goodwill Games
Silver medal – second place	1994 St. Petersburg
European U-18 Championship
Gold medal – first place	1990 Netherlands	U-18

Alessandro Abbio (born 13 March 1971 in Racconigi, Province of Cuneo) is an Italian former professional basketball player.

== Professional career ==
Abbio was the MVP of the Italian SuperCup in 1998, and he also won the Euroleague twice; in 1997–98 and 2000–01, with Virtus Bologna.

== National team career ==
Abbio competed with Italy at the 1998 FIBA World Championship and at the 2000 Summer Olympic Games.
