= Hüseyin Beşok =

Turkish basketball player (born 1975)

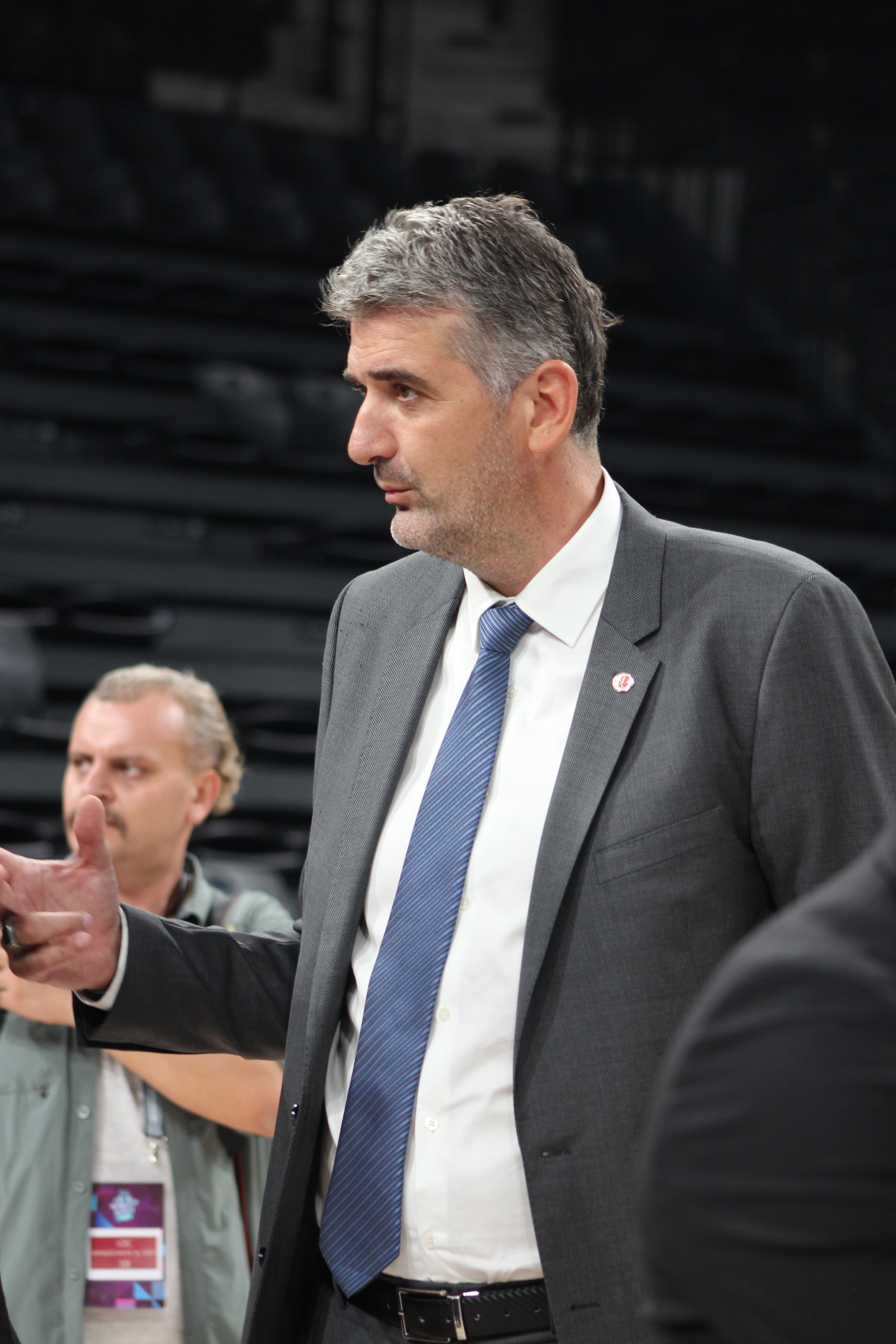

Personal information
- Born: 8 February 1975 (age 51) İzmir, Turkey
- Listed height: 6 ft 11 in (2.11 m)
- Listed weight: 265 lb (120 kg)

Career information
- Playing career: 1992–2014
- Position: Center
- Number: 12

Career history
- 1992–1994: Pınar Karşıyaka
- 1994–2001: Efes Pilsen
- 2001–2003: Maccabi Tel Aviv
- 2003–2004: Sunce Šibenik
- 2004–2005: ASVEL Basket
- 2005–2006: Le Mans
- 2006–2007: Prokom Trefl Sopot
- 2007–2009: Galatasaray Café Crown
- 2009–2010: Türk Telekom
- 2010–2011: Aliağa Petkim
- 2011–2012: Beşiktaş Cola Turka
- 2012–2013: Hacettepe Üniversitesi
- 2013–2014: Türk Telekom

Hüseyin Beşok (born 8 February 1975) is a Turkish former professional basketball player. Standing at 2.11 m (6 ft 11 in) in height and 120 kg (265 lbs) in weight, he used to play as center.

== Professional career ==
A solid big man, he played for Pınar Karşıyaka at the youth and senior level before transferring to Efes Pilsen, where he spent several seasons.

He also played for Maccabi Tel Aviv in Israel, Šibenik in Croatia, Asvel in France, shortly for UNICS Kazan in Russia, Le Mans in France and Prokom in Poland in the 2006–07 season start.

He was the highest paid athlete in Polish club sport history (including soccer, volleyball, etc.) with a yearly fee of US$700,000.

He used to be a regular member of the Turkish national basketball team.

== Honours ==
=== Club honours ===
- Korać Cup: 1996
- Turkish Basketball League (2): 1996, 1997
- Turkish Cup (3): 1996, 1998, 2001
- Turkish President's Cup: 2000
- 2x Turkish Basketball All-Star Game (2008, 2009)
- Israeli Premier League (2): 2002, 2003
- Israeli State Cup (2): 2002, 2003
- LNB Pro A: 2006
- Polish Basketball League: 2007

=== Individual awards ===
- LNB All Star Game (2): 2005, 2006
- LNB Pro A Finals MVP: 2006
