= Jim Bilba =

French basketball player and coach

Personal information
- Born: 17 April 1968 (age 58) Pointe-à-Pitre, France
- Listed height: 198 cm (6 ft 6 in)
- Listed weight: 105 kg (231 lb)

Career information
- Playing career: 1988–2007
- Position: Power forward / center
- Number: 10
- Coaching career: 2008–present

Career history

Playing
- 1988–1992: Cholet
- 1992–1996: Limoges
- 1996–2001: ASVEL
- 2001–2002: AEK
- 2002: TAU Cerámica
- 2002–2007: Cholet

Coaching
- 2008–2014: Cholet (assistant)
- 2014–2017: Limoges CSP (assistant)

Career highlights
- As player: EuroLeague champion (1993); FIBA EuroStar (1999); Greek League champion (2002); 2× French League champion (1993, 1994); 4× French Federation Cup winner (1994, 1995, 1997, 2001); 3× French League French Players' MVP (1997, 1998, 2001); 4× French League Best Defender (1997, 1999–2001); French League Rising Star (1989); 12× French All-Star Game (1990–2001); 2× French All-Star Game MVP (1993, 2000); French Basketball Hall of Fame (2014); No. 10 retired by Cholet
Medals
Representing France
Men's basketball
Olympic Games
Silver medal – second place	2000 Sydney

Jim Ruddy Anicet Bilba (born 17 April 1968 in Pointe-à-Pitre) is a former professional basketball player and coach, from France.

== Professional career ==
Bilba won the EuroLeague championship with Limoges CSP in 1993.

== National team career ==
Bilba won the silver medal at the 2000 Summer Olympics, while playing with the senior French national basketball team.

== Coaching career ==
After he retired from playing professional basketball, Bilba became an assistant coach of the French basketball club, Limoges CSP.
