= Giacomo Galanda =

Italian basketball player

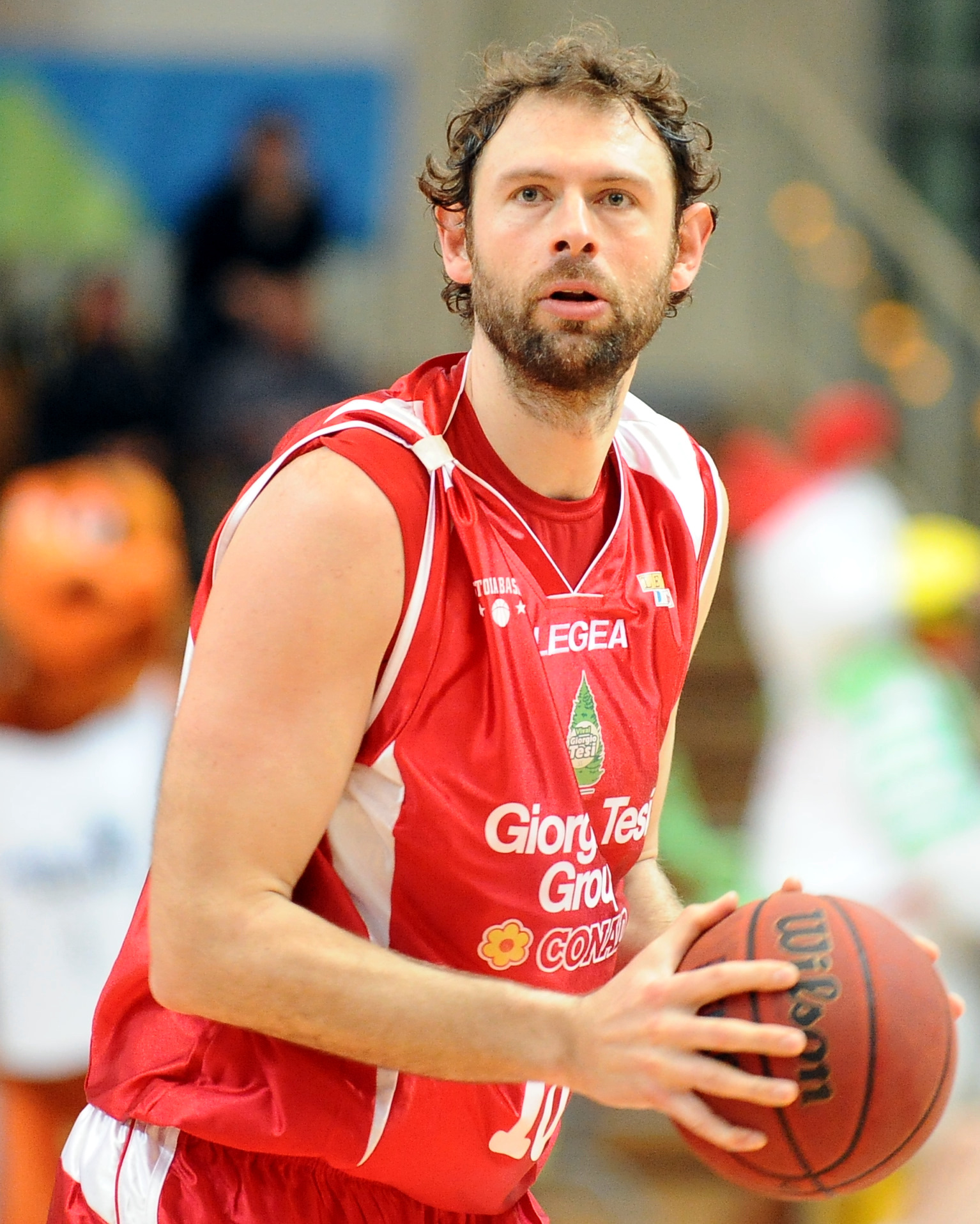

Personal information
- Born: 30 January 1975 (age 51) Udine, Italy
- Listed height: 6 ft 10.75 in (2.10 m)
- Listed weight: 243 lb (110 kg)

Career information
- Playing career: 1993–2014
- Position: Power forward / center

Career history
- 1993–1997: Scaligera Verona
- 1997–2003: Fortitudo Bologna
- 1998–1999: →Pallacanestro Varese
- 2003–2005: Montepaschi Siena
- 2005–2006: Armani Jeans Milano
- 2006–2011: Pallacanestro Varese
- 2011–2014: Giorgio Tesi Group Pistoia

Career highlights
- Italian Supercup MVP (1996)
Medals
Men's basketball
Representing Italy
Summer Olympic Games
Silver medal – second place	Athens 2004	National Team
FIBA EuroBasket
Gold medal – first place	1999 France	National Team
Silver medal – second place	1997 Spain	National Team
Bronze medal – third place	2003 Sweden	National Team

Giacomo "Jack" Galanda (born 30 January 1975) is a retired Italian professional basketball player. He was a forward-center of 2.10 m. (6 ft. 10¾ in.) and 110 kg. (243 lbs.).

== Professional career ==
Galanda was born in Udine, Friuli. He grew up in the Scaligera Basket Verona junior teams, with which he made his debut in the Italian League on 17 October 1993. After four years in the Verona team, he was traded to Fortitudo Bologna. However, in his first year (1997–98) he was utilized as a reserve to Gregor Fučka, and had a limited impact.

In 1998, he was loaned to Pallacanestro Varese, where he was a leader of the team that, surprisingly, won the Italian League championship. Galanda therefore returned to Bologna, where he remained until 2003, when he was traded to Montepaschi Siena. He won two further Italian league championships in 2000 and 2004. In the 2005–06 season, Galanda played with Armani Jeans Milano. From 2006 to 2011, he played for Pallacanestro Varese. In 2011, he signed with Giorgio Tesi Group Pistoia. In May 2014, he announced his retirement.

== Italian national team ==
Galanda made his debut with the senior men's Italian national basketball team in 1997, and soon turned into one of the more representative players from his country. Some of his successes with the Azzurri jersey include silver and gold medals at the FIBA EuroBasket (1997 and 1999, respectively), and a silver medal at the 2004 Summer Olympic Games of Athens.
