= Moustapha Sonko =

French basketball player

Medal record

Representing France

Men's basketball

Olympic Games
Silver medal – second place	2000 Sydney	

Moustapha Sonko (born 14 June 1972 in Paris, France) is a former professional basketball player from France. He was inducted into the French Basketball Hall of Fame in 2018.

== Professional career ==
Sonko was the French 2nd Division French Player's MVP in 1993. He was the French 1st Division's French Player's MVP, in 2000.

== National team career ==
Sonko won the silver medal at the 2000 Summer Olympics, with the senior French national basketball team.
