= Dragan Lukovski =

Macedonian-born Serbian basketball player

Personal information
- Born: 21 April 1975 (age 51) Skopje, SR Macedonia, SFR Yugoslavia
- Listed height: 1.91 m (6 ft 3 in)
- Listed weight: 85 kg (187 lb)

Career information
- NBA draft: 1997: undrafted
- Playing career: 1993–2008
- Position: Point guard

Career history
- 1993–1994: Spartak Subotica
- 1994–1995: Vojvodina
- 1995–1999: Partizan
- 1999–2000: Crvena zvezda
- 2000–2001: Fenerbahçe
- 2001–2004: Pau-Orthez
- 2004–2005: Makedonikos
- 2005–2006: Kyiv
- 2006–2007: Panionios
- 2007–2008: Limoges CSP
Medals
Men's basketball
Representing (Federal Republic of Yugoslavia) FR Yugoslavia
EuroBasket
Bronze medal – third place	1999 France
World Cup
Gold medal – first place	1998 Athens
'22 & under' World Championship
Bronze medal – third place	1997 Australia	Under-21
'22 & under' European Championship
Bronze medal – third place	1996 Turkey	Under-20

Dragan Lukovski (born 21 March 1975) is a Macedonian-born Serbian retired professional basketball player, who played as a point guard. He is 1.91 m (6 ft 3 in) tall and weighs 85 kg. Dragan and his father, Janko Lukovski, former coach, are now owners of basketball club Sport Key in Novi Sad (Serbia).

== Personal life ==
He has two children, Lola and Dimitrije, who currently live in Belgrade.
