= Sergei Panov (basketball) =

Russian basketball player

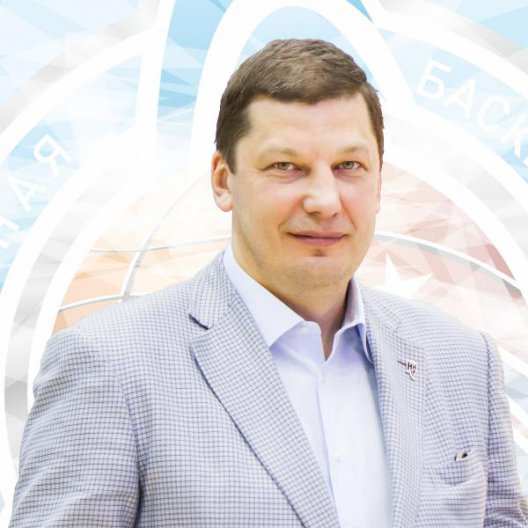

Personal information
- Born: June 30, 1970 (age 56) Ryazan, Russian SFSR, Soviet Union
- Listed height: 2.03 m (6 ft 8 in)
- Listed weight: 100 kg (220 lb)

Career information
- NBA draft: 1992: undrafted
- Playing career: 1991–2006
- Position: Power forward

Career history
- 1991–1993: Spartak Saint Petersburg
- 1993–1994: Yıldırımspor
- 1994–2000: CSKA Moscow
- 2000–2002: Ural Great Perm
- 2002–2006: CSKA Moscow
Medals
Representing Russia
Men's basketball
World Championship
Silver medal – second place	1994 Canada	Russia
Silver medal – second place	1998 Greece	Russia
European Championships
Silver medal – second place	1993 Germany	Russia
Bronze medal – third place	1997 Spain	Russia

Sergei Yuryevich Panov (alternate spelling: Sergey Yurievich, Russian: Сергей Юрьевич Панов; born June 30, 1970) is a Russian retired professional basketball player. He represented the Russian national basketball team.

== Achievements ==
- Won the 2005/06 EuroLeague with CSKA Moscow
- won the 1994/95, 1995/96, 1996/97, 1997/98, 1998/99, 1999/00, 2002/03, 2003/04, 2004/05 and 2005/06 Russian Championship CSKA Moscow
- won the 2000/01 and 2001/02 Russian Championship Ural Great Perm
- won the 2005 and 2006 Russian Cup with CSKA Moscow
- won the 1999/00 NEBL Championship with CSKA Moscow
- won the 2000/01 NEBL Championship with Ural Great Perm
- won the silver medal at the 1993 European Championship
- won the silver medal at the 1994 and 1998 FIBA World Championship
- won the bronze medal at the 1997 European Championship
