= FIBA EuroBasket 2003 qualification =

Qualification for the 2003 FIBA European Championship, commonly called FIBA EuroBasket 2003 took place between 17 May 2000 and 25 January 2003. A total of fourteen teams qualified for the tournament. Sweden and Serbia and Montenegro qualified directly as hosts and EuroBasket 2001 Champions respectively.

== Format ==
Competition consisted of three stages:

- A preliminary round that consisted of six teams that competed in a round-robin tournament that took place in Vejle, Denmark between 17 May and 25 May 2000. The top two teams advanced to the semi-final round.
- A qualifying round where the third through sixth teams from the preliminary round joined another ten teams. The sixteen teams were divided into four round-robin groups of four teams each. Each group competition consisted of home and away legs, taking place in each of the participating countries. The top two teams from each group advanced to the semi-final round.
- A Semi-Final round where the teams that advanced through the preliminary and qualifying rounds joined another twenty teams. All thirty teams where then divided in five round-robin groups of six teams each. This stage took place between 21 November 2001 and 25 January 2003 and competition consisted of home and away legs, taking place in each of the participating countries. The top two teams from each group plus the four best third-placed teams qualified for EuroBasket 2003.

== Preliminary round ==
Qualified for the semi-final round
Qualified for the qualifying round

Team	Pld	W	L	PF	PA	PD	Pts	Tie
Denmark	5	4	1	320	296	+24	9	1–0
Cyprus	5	4	1	347	317	+30	9	0–1
Georgia	5	2	3	377	385	−8	7	1–1, 1.086
Romania	5	2	3	315	317	−2	7	1–1, 0.968
Ireland	5	2	3	336	344	−8	7	1–1, 0.938
Luxembourg	5	1	4	350	386	−36	6	

Rules=1) Points; 2) Head-to-head results; 3) Points difference; 4) Points scored.

17 May 2000
16:00

Boxscore

Ireland	57–51	Romania
Scoring by half: 24–19, 33–32
Pts: Lacey 20; Rebs: Lacey 12; Asts: Maguire, O'Connell, Burke 2		Pts: Alexe 16; Rebs: Lapuste 11; Asts: Alexe 3

Velje

17 May 2000
18:30

Boxscore

Denmark	58–57	Cyprus
Scoring by half: 32–39, 26–18
Pts: Jerichow 12; Rebs: Jerichow 8 Asts: Larsen 5		Pts: Anastasiadis 12; Rebs: Trisokkas 5 Asts: Kounounis, Zachariou 2

Velje

17 May 2000
20:30

Boxscore

Georgia	71–92	Luxembourg
Scoring by half: 30–42, 41–50
Pts: Gogoberishvili 20; Rebs: Pachulia 9 Asts: Gogoberishvili 2		Pts: Feyder 31; Rebs: Schiltz 7 Asts: Delgado Almeida Rosario, 6

Velje

18 May 2000
16:00

Boxscore

Ireland	65–68	Cyprus
Scoring by half: 34–36, 31–32
Pts: O'Connell 17; Rebs: Lacey 14; Asts: Fulton 4		Pts: Anastasiadis, Raca 14; Rebs: Kounounis, Trisokkas 8 Asts: Kounounis 5

Velje

18 May 2000
18:00

Boxscore

Romania	71–69	Georgia
Scoring by half: 37–36, 34–33
Pts: Stanescu 23; Rebs: Lapuste, Stanescu 6 Asts: Veres 4		Pts: Abramidze, Tskitishvili, Boisa 11; Rebs: Tskitishvili 7 Asts: Abramidze 3

Velje

18 May 2000
20:00

Boxscore

Denmark	74–60	Luxembourg
Scoring by half: 44–34, 30–26
Pts: Jerichow 22; Rebs: Larsen 6 Asts: Ahmad 10		Pts: Schiltz 18; Rebs: Schiltz, Feyder 6 Asts: Adam, Schiltz, Delgado Almeida Rosario, Wohl 2

Velje

19 May 2000
16:00

Boxscore

Romania	51–65	Cyprus
Scoring by half: 26–28, 25–37
Pts: Torday 12; Rebs: Torday 6 Asts: Alexe 4		Pts: Stylianides, Raca 16; Rebs: Trisokkas 11; Asts: Stylianides 2

Velje

19 May 2000
18:00

Boxscore

Ireland	76–68	Luxembourg
Scoring by half: 27–33, 49–35
Pts: O'Connell, Lacey 13; Rebs: Lacey 12; Asts: Fulton, Bree 3		Pts: Schiltz 26; Rebs: Feyder 7 Asts: Adam 6

Velje

19 May 2000
20:00

Boxscore

Denmark	62–67	Georgia
Scoring by half: 38–40, 24–27
Pts: Jerichow 17; Rebs: Ahmad, Jerichow 5 Asts: Ahmad 4		Pts: Gogoberishvili 23; Rebs: Pachulia 8 Asts: Abramidze 3

Velje

20 May 2000
14:00

Boxscore

Romania	88–62	Luxembourg
Scoring by half: 48–29, 40–33
Pts: Alexe 26; Rebs: Scobai 10; Asts: Alecu, Alexe 3		Pts: Feyder 17; Rebs: Schiltz, Maes 6 Asts: Feyder 3

Velje

20 May 2000

Boxscore

Denmark	62–58	Ireland
Scoring by half: 24–25, 38–33
Pts: Rasmussen, Jerichow, Larsen 15; Rebs: Larsen 13; Asts: Ahmad 3		Pts: Lacey 19; Rebs: Lacey 11; Asts: Fulton 3

Velje

20 May 2000

Boxscore

Georgia	75–80 (OT)	Cyprus
Scoring by half: 35–36, 29–28 Overtime: 11–16
Pts: Boisa 14; Rebs: Boisa 7 Asts: Gogoberishvili 6		Pts: Raca 26; Rebs: Trisokkas 8 Asts: Stylianides 3

Velje

21 May 2000

Boxscore

Ireland	80–95	Georgia
Scoring by half: 44–49, 36–46
Pts: Lacey 27; Rebs: Lacey 15; Asts: Mc Carthy 3		Pts: Tskitishvili 25; Rebs: Pachulia 13; Asts: Khoshtaria 5

Velje

21 May 2000

Boxscore

Denmark	64–54	Romania
Scoring by half: 35–29, 29–25
Pts: Jerichow 21; Rebs: Larsen 9 Asts: Larsen 3		Pts: Scobai 17; Rebs: Scobai, Alexe 6 Asts: Alecu, Fometescu, Scobai 1

Velje

21 May 2000

Boxscore

Luxembourg	68–77	Cyprus
Scoring by half: 33–38, 35–39
Pts: Schiltz 15; Rebs: Wohl 7 Asts: Bevilacqua 3		Pts: Zachariou 17; Rebs: Trisokkas 6 Asts: Palalas 4

Velje

== Qualifying round ==
Qualified for the semi-final round

=== Group 1 ===
Team	Pld	W	L	PF	PA	PD	Pts
Romania	6	5	1	486	396	+90	11
Hungary	6	4	2	568	370	+198	10
Austria	6	3	3	464	465	−1	9
Malta	6	0	6	362	649	−287	6

2 Jun 2001
20:00

Boxscore

Austria	68–73	Romania
Scoring by quarter: 14–17, 16–13, 16–17, 22–26
Pts: Stazic 22; Rebs: Kogler 4 Asts: Volcic 5		Pts: Muresan 24; Rebs: Muresan 13; Asts: Fometescu 2

Feldkirchen
Attendance: 1,200
Referees: Ivo Dolinek (CZE), Roman Kolar (SLO)

13 Jun 2001
20:30

Boxscore

Malta	43–138	Hungary
Scoring by quarter: 16–35, 8–36, 7–36, 12–31
Pts: Cassar 18; Rebs: Cassar 9 Asts: Said 3		Pts: Sitku 22; Rebs: Sitku 8 Asts: Mészáros 11

Ta'Qali-Rabat
Referees: Luciano Tola (ITA), Maria Argirou (GRE)

6 Jun 2001
17:00

Boxscore

Romania	56–53	Hungary
Scoring by quarter: 20–12, 7–14, 12–15, 17–12
Pts: Alexe 17; Rebs: Stanescu 10; Asts: Alexe 3		Pts: Németh 18; Rebs: Báder 8 Asts: Mészáros 4

Sibiu
Attendance: 2,500
Referees: Zoran Zlatevski (MKD), Fedor Dmitriev (BLR)

6 Jun 2001
20:30

Boxscore

Malta	84–102	Austria
Scoring by quarter: 26–24, 18–28, 23–26, 17–24
Pts: Naudi 19; Rebs: Micallef 6 Asts: Cassar 4		Pts: Mc Neil 22; Rebs: Mc Neil 12; Asts: Stazic 7

Ta'Qali-Rabat
Referees: Dashamir Bardhi (ALB), Marco Giansanti (ITA)

9 Jun 2001
17:00

Boxscore

Romania	110–47	Malta
Scoring by quarter: 22–8, 29–6, 36–11, 23–22
Pts: Popescu 23; Rebs: Stanescu, Toader 9 Asts: Fometescu 7		Pts: Naudi 18; Rebs: Cassar 7 Asts: Naudi, Riolo 1

Sibiu
Attendance: 2,000
Referees: Tonci Anzulovic (CRO), Milan Mazic (SRB)

9 Jun 2001
18:00

Boxscore

Hungary	100–58	Austria
Scoring by quarter: 17–12, 27–14, 24–15, 32–17
Pts: Kálmán 26; Rebs: Czigler 4 Asts: Kálmán 11		Pts: Volcic 16; Rebs: Weissenböck, Volcic 3 Asts: Volcic 2

Szombathely
Attendance: 1,000
Referees: Jaroslav Janac (SVK), Dragan Neskovic (SRB)

25 Aug 2001
18:00

Boxscore

Hungary	108–54	Malta
Scoring by quarter: 28–11, 22–11, 35–23, 23–9
Pts: Gémes 23; Rebs: Gémes 9 Asts: Kálmán 10		Pts: Naudi 16; Rebs: Naudi, Cassar 7 Asts: Naudi 2

Hódmezővásárhely
Referees: Tomas Teluch (CZE), Milan Brziak (SVK)

25 Aug 2001
19:00

Boxscore

Romania	74–59	Austria
Scoring by quarter: 18–21, 20–11, 13–12, 23–15
Pts: Alexe 20; Rebs: Stanescu 12; Asts: Alexe 3		Pts: Kollik 20; Rebs: Mc Caw 8 Asts: Woschank 3

Sibiu
Attendance: 1,800
Referees: Vladimir Atanasov (BUL), Caslav Cukalovic (SRB)

29 Aug 2001
18:00

Boxscore

Hungary	88–72	Romania
Scoring by quarter: 17–27, 24–13, 22–14, 25–18
Pts: Kálmán 20; Rebs: Báder 6 Asts: Kálmán 7		Pts: Alexe 22; Rebs: Stanescu 7 Asts: Alecu 3

Szombathely
Attendance: 1,400
Referees: Sasa Pukl (SLO), Sinisa Herceg (CRO)

29 Aug 2001
19:00

Boxscore

Austria	90–53	Malta
Scoring by quarter: 28–10, 25–16, 18–15, 19–12
Pts: Kollik 20; Rebs: Mayer, Mc Caw, Moschik 5 Asts: Woschank, Geisler		Pts: Said 22; Rebs: Gatt 5 Asts: Riolo 2

Feldkirchen
Referees: Jaroslav Janac (SVK), Igor Poljansek(SLO)

1 Sep 2001
18:00

Boxscore

Austria	87–81	Hungary
Scoring by quarter: 27–23, 19–15, 23–20, 18–23
Pts: Mc Caw 32; Rebs: Buggelsheim 12; Asts: Buggelsheim 7		Pts: Sitku 20; Rebs: Sitku, Báder 5 Asts: Fodor, Németh 3

Traiskirchen
Referees: Karel Bruna (CZE), Srdan Dozai (CRO)

1 Sep 2001
19:00

Boxscore

Malta	81–101	Romania
Scoring by quarter: 16–20, 23–27, 25–23, 17–31
Pts: Said 29; Rebs: Cassar 7 Asts: Said, Bezzina 7		Pts: Popescu 28; Rebs: Lapuste, Popescu 7 Asts: Alexe 8

Ta'Qali-Rabat
Referees: Alberto Grossi (ITA), Gian Luigi Giancecchi (SMR)

=== Group 2 ===
Team	Pld	W	L	PF	PA	PD	Pts
Czech Republic	6	5	1	532	422	+110	11
Portugal	6	4	2	465	392	+73	10
Slovakia	6	3	3	525	469	+56	9
Luxembourg	6	0	6	397	636	−239	6

25 May 2001
19:00

Boxscore

Portugal	98–67	Luxembourg
Scoring by quarter: 29–14, 17–20, 30–11, 22–22
Pts: Gómez Marques Pinto 20; Rebs: Gómez Marques Pinto 9 Asts: Costa 5		Pts: M. Rajniak 19; Rebs: M. Rajniak 6 Asts: Adam, Schiltz 4

Rio Maior
Attendance: 3,000
Referees: Andre De Wispelaere (BEL), Chantal Julien (FRA)

3 Jun 2001
19:00

Boxscore

Slovakia	85–95	Czech Republic
Scoring by quarter: 31–31, 21–26, 18–21, 15–17
Pts: Krämer 24; Rebs: Svitek 7 Asts: Svitek 3		Pts: Sokolovsky 18; Rebs: Becka 7 Asts: Czudek 6

Lucenec
Attendance: 2,000
Referees: Andrej Jelen (SLO), Erich Kratschmer (AUT)

6 Jun 2001
16:30

Boxscore

Czech Republic	68–55	Portugal
Scoring by quarter: 20–8, 21–16, 9–13, 18–18
Pts: Welsch 18; Rebs: Sokolovsky 8 Asts: Hruby 4		Pts: Gómez Marques Pinto 14; Rebs: Gómez Marques Pinto 5 Asts: Gouveia Simão 2

Opava
Attendance: 1,000
Referees: Tomasz Kudlicki (POL), Peter Bodnar (HUN)

6 Jun 2001
19:00

Boxscore

Luxembourg	64–111	Slovakia
Scoring by quarter: 23–29, 16–24, 16–31, 9–27
Pts: Adam 17; Rebs: M. Rajniak 7 Asts: Adam, Delgado Almeida Rosario, Boever, P. Rajniak 2		Pts: Krämer 23; Rebs: Andruska 11; Asts: Jankovic 5

Luxembourg
Referees: Jens Staudenmayer (GER), Markus Grievink (GER)

9 Jun 2001
17:00

Boxscore

Slovakia	88–83	Portugal
Scoring by quarter: 19–27, 25–14, 19–22, 25–20
Pts: Zabavnik 18; Rebs: R. Rancik 6 Asts: Toya, Jankovic 4		Pts: Richmond 26; Rebs: Richmond 9 Asts: Costa 7

Lucenec
Attendance: 2,000
Referees: György Varadi (HUN), Sinisa Herceg (CRO)

9 Jun 2001
20:00

Boxscore

Luxembourg	85–95	Czech Republic
Scoring by quarter: 20–26, 27–20, 20–23, 18–26
Pts: Schiltz 21; Rebs: M. Rajniak 6 Asts: Adam 7		Pts: Becka 20; Rebs: Becka, Frana 9 Asts: Welsch 3

Luxembourg
Referees: Gilles Bretagne (FRA), Werner Huybreghs (BEL)

25 Aug 2001
20:00

Boxscore

Luxembourg	59–91	Portugal
Scoring by quarter: 26–23, 14–21, 9–24, 10–23
Pts: Adam 18; Rebs: Adam 6 Asts: Becker 4		Pts: A. Selores Ramos 17; Rebs: Evora 8 Asts: Azevedo de Seixas 3

Walferdange
Referees: Serge De Coster (BEL), Paul Den Hartog (NED)

26 Aug 2001
18:15

Boxscore

Czech Republic	93–71	Slovakia
Scoring by quarter: 18–19, 28–16, 23–23, 24–13
Pts: Becka 22; Rebs: Becka 8 Asts: Welsch, Becka 3		Pts: M. Rancik 30; Rebs: M. Rancik 7 Asts: Svitek, Krämer, Jankovic 1

Brno
Attendance: 1,500
Referees: Leszek Rakoczy (POL), Robert Bartonek (AUT)

29 Aug 2001
18:00

Boxscore

Slovakia	106–57	Luxembourg
Scoring by quarter: 21–13, 28–18, 27–13, 30–13
Pts: Toya 16; Rebs: Andruska 9 Asts: Toya, M. Rancik, R. Rancik 3		Pts: Becker 15; Rebs: Boever 7 Asts: Becker, Adam 2

Bratislava
Attendance: 1,000
Referees: Peter Bodnar (HUN), Janusz Calik (POL)

29 Aug 2001
19:30

Boxscore

Portugal	61–46	Czech Republic
Scoring by quarter: 12–9, 13–9, 16–12, 20–16
Pts: A. Selores Ramos 17; Rebs: A. Selores Ramos 11; Asts: Tavares, Azevedo de Seixas, Costa 2		Pts: Starosta 10; Rebs: Starosta 15; Asts: Necas 3

Tondela
Attendance: 1,500
Referees: Christophe Vauthier (FRA), Manuel Alzuria (ESP)

1 Sep 2001
15:30

Boxscore

Portugal	77–64	Slovakia
Scoring by quarter: 25–17, 10–10, 22–12, 20–25
Pts: A. Selores Ramos 17; Rebs: Evora 8 Asts: Tavares 7		Pts: Toya, Andruska, Krämer 12; Rebs: Andruska 9 Asts: Toya, Krämer, Jankovic 2

Tondela
Attendance: 2,500
Referees: Pierre-Yves Bichon (FRA), Neil Wilkinson (ENG)

1 Sep 2001
17:00

Boxscore

Czech Republic	135–65	Luxembourg
Scoring by quarter: 32–13, 30–18, 29–17, 44–17
Pts: Starosta 22; Rebs: Starosta 16; Asts: Adam 6		Pts: Czudek 18; Rebs: Grand 5 Asts: Becker, Adam 3

Svitavy
Attendance: 1,000
Referees: Peter Vigh (HUN), Dariusz Szczerba (POL)

=== Group 3 ===
Team	Pld	W	L	PF	PA	PD	Pts	Tie
Bulgaria	6	4	2	531	427	+104	10	2–2, 1.0468
Belarus	6	4	2	542	410	+132	10	2–2, 1.0465
Georgia	6	4	2	509	437	+72	10	2–2, 0.9159
Azerbaijan	6	0	6	341	649	−308	6	

Rules=1) Points; 2) Head-to-head results; 3) Points difference; 4) Points scored.

2 Jun 2001
19:00

Boxscore

Belarus	121–50	Azerbaijan
Scoring by quarter: 39–11, 16–12, 39–18, 27–9
Pts: Baidakou 31; Rebs: Korshuk 15; Asts: Meshcharakou, Klemez, Vasileuka 6		Pts: Bakhshiyev 10; Rebs: Sariyev, Hamidzade 6 Asts: Pashayev 5

Gomel
Attendance: 1,000
Referees: Viktor Bozhenar (UKR), Rafael Ganiev (RUS)

3 Jun 2001
17:00

Boxscore

Georgia	91–75	Bulgaria
Scoring by quarter: 18–16, 29–14, 24–19, 20–26
Pts: Natsvlishvili 25; Rebs: Natsvlishvili 11; Asts: Gogoberishvili 3		Pts: Minchev 16; Rebs: Minchev 6 Asts: Minchev 3

Tbilisi
Attendance: 3,500
Referees: Igor Lebedev (RUS), Tolga Sahin (ITA)

6 Jun 2001
15:00

Boxscore

Azerbaijan	62–101	Bulgaria
Scoring by quarter: 14–23, 14–30, 14–23, 20–25
Pts: Samoylov 13; Rebs: Niftaliyev, Samoylov 6 Asts: Belousov 5		Pts: Angelov 19; Rebs: Banev 13; Asts: Koeshinov 11

Baku
Referees: Haluk Yesiloglu (TUR), Sergiy Chebyshev (UKR)

6 Jun 2001
17:00

Boxscore

Georgia	83–78	Belarus
Scoring by quarter: 21–25, 20–13, 18–31, 24–9
Pts: Pachulia 24; Rebs: Pachulia 19; Asts: Jgenti 4		Pts: Korshuk 22; Rebs: Koul 9 Asts: Baidakou 2

Sports Palace, Tbilisi
Attendance: 6,000
Referees: Igor Lebedev (RUS), Tolga Sahin (ITA)

9 Jun 2001
15:00

Boxscore

Azerbaijan	61–101	Georgia
Scoring by quarter: 21–29, 17–20, 13–28, 10–24
Pts: Samoylov 17; Rebs: Samoylov 14; Asts: Pashayev 8		Pts: Boisa 23; Rebs: Boisa, Shengelia 9 Asts: Jgenti, Tortladze 7

Baku
Referees: Haluk Yesiloglu (TUR), Sergiy Chebyshev (UKR)

9 Jun 2001
17:00

Boxscore

Bulgaria	90–64	Belarus
Scoring by quarter: 31–17, 17–17, 29–20, 13–10
Pts: Minchev 28; Rebs: Natov 10; Asts: Ravutsov 9		Pts: Koul 15; Rebs: Koul 12; Asts: Pyntsikau 4

Diana Hall, Yambol
Attendance: 2,000
Referees: Tihomir Bubalo (SRB), Marjan Stojovski (MKD)

25 Aug 2001
15:00

Boxscore

Azerbaijan	59–106	Belarus
Scoring by quarter: 11–28, 16–29, 19–22, 13–27
Pts: Sariyev 13; Rebs: Sariyev 5 Asts: Pashayev, Huseynov 6		Pts: Pyntsikau 21; Rebs: Kuzmin, Kojenets, Kuchinski 7 Asts: Kuchinski 10

Baku
Referees: Vladimir Dadugin (RUS), Viktor Bozhenar (UKR)

25 Aug 2001
17:00

Boxscore

Bulgaria	85–66	Georgia
Scoring by quarter: 27–9, 11–18, 23–11, 24–28
Pts: Stoykov 30; Rebs: Natov, Stoykov 9 Asts: Stoykov 4		Pts: Boisa 15; Rebs: Natsvlishvili 10; Asts: Khoshtaria, Gogoberishvili 1

Diana Hall, Yambol
Attendance: 1,500
Referees: Mehmet Keseratar (TUR), Doru Vinasi (ROU)

29 Aug 2001
17:00

Boxscore

Bulgaria	117–66	Azerbaijan
Scoring by quarter: 24–8, 36–12, 23–27, 34–19
Pts: Angelov 25; Rebs: Banev 12; Asts: Koeshinov 4		Pts: Bakhshiyev 18; Rebs: Pashayev 8 Asts: Bakhshiyev, Yusubov 2

Diana Hall, Yambol
Attendance: 1,000
Referees: Jovan Krstevski (MKD), Branislav Mrdak (SRB)

29 Aug 2001
19:00

Boxscore

Belarus	95–65	Georgia
Scoring by quarter: 26–17, 18–13, 25–25, 26–10
Pts: Baidakou 27; Rebs: Baidakou 9 Asts: Kuzmin 8		Pts: Gogoberishvili 20; Rebs: Pachulia 7 Asts: Tortladze, Gogoberishvili 1

Gomel
Attendance: 1,500
Referees: Volodymyr Drabikovskyi (UKR), Vladimir Okhrimenko (RUS)

1 Sep 2001
17:00

Boxscore

Belarus	78–63	Bulgaria
Scoring by quarter: 15–18, 27–15, 19–12, 17–18
Pts: Baidakou 16; Rebs: Baidakou 8 Asts: Krivonos 7		Pts: Stoykov 16; Rebs: Natov, Angelov 7 Asts: Koeshinov 2

Gomel
Attendance: 1,200
Referees: Ivan Zachara (CZE), Grzegorz Ziemblicki (POL)

2 Sep 2001
17:00

Boxscore

Georgia	103–43	Azerbaijan
Scoring by quarter: 20–13, 25–12, 25–7, 33–11
Pts: Khoshtaria 23; Rebs: Pachulia 13; Asts: Tortladze, Mushkudiani 2		Pts: Niftaliyev 11; Rebs: Niftaliyev 8 Asts: Sariyev, Isgandarov, Yusubov 1

Tbilisi
Attendance: 1,000
Referees: Igor Demenkov (RUS), Sergiy Chebyshev (UKR)

=== Group 4 ===
Team	Pld	W	L	PF	PA	PD	Pts
Ireland	6	5	1	435	415	+20	11
Switzerland	6	4	2	425	392	+33	10
Finland	6	3	3	465	433	+32	9
Iceland	6	0	6	406	491	−85	6

2 Jun 2001
17:30

Boxscore

Switzerland	67–58	Ireland
Scoring by quarter: 19–14, 22–14, 12–11, 14–19
Pts: Sassella 15; Rebs: Thürig 9 Asts: Jaquier 9		Pts: Kennedy 14; Rebs: J. T. Larranaga, Moran 5 Asts: Donlon 5

Nyon
Referees: Stojan Fiser (SLO), Paolo Taurino (ITA)

22 Aug 2001
20:00

Boxscore

Iceland	73–84	Finland
Scoring by quarter: 32–26, 15–26, 16–18, 10–14

Reykjavík
Attendance: 1,000
Referees: Serge De Coster (BEL), Keith Williams (ENG)

6 Jun 2001
19:30

Boxscore

Ireland	70–68	Finland
Scoring by quarter: 14–17, 21–21, 20–16, 15–14
Pts: Donlon 16; Rebs: J. T. Larranaga, J. J. Larranaga 8 Asts: Donlon 4		Pts: Rannikko 19; Rebs: Riihelä 12; Asts: Mäkelä 4

Dublin
Attendance: 1,500
Referees: Fernand Hengel (LUX), Serge De Coster (BEL)

6 Jun 2001
20:15

Boxscore

Switzerland	77–68	Iceland
Scoring by quarter: 25–15, 16–17, 24–16, 12–20
Pts: Mrazek 26; Rebs: Thürig, Bachmann 5 Asts: Koller 8		Pts: Gudfinnsson 20; Rebs: F. Olafsson 7 Asts: Arnarson 3

Nyon
Referees: Peter Poiger (AUT), Nicolas Maestre (FRA)

9 Jun 2001
18:00

Boxscore

Finland	60–73	Switzerland
Scoring by quarter: 8–15, 20–20, 14–19, 18–19
Pts: Rannikko 13; Rebs: Tenngren 5 Asts: Toijala 3		Pts: Edwards 15; Rebs: Thürig 10; Asts: Koller 4

Kouvola
Attendance: 2,000
Referees: Atso Matsalu (EST), Arnis Ozols (LAT)

9 Jun 2001
19:30

Boxscore

Ireland	70–59	Iceland
Scoring by quarter: 20–17, 17–17, 13–14, 20–11
Pts: Kennedy 19; Rebs: J. T. Larranaga 10; Asts: Donlon 8		Pts: Gudfinnsson, J. Stefansson 11; Rebs: F. Stefánsson 11; Asts: J. Stefansson 5

Dublin
Attendance: 1,800
Referees: Edward Mckinley (SCO), Björn Braathen (NOR)

25 Aug 2001
18:00

Boxscore

Finland	97–66	Iceland
Scoring by quarter: 22–12, 31–14, 22–13, 22–27
Pts: Möttölä 23; Rebs: Riihelä 10; Asts: Toijala 5		Pts: J. Stefansson 19; Rebs: F. Stefánsson 7 Asts: J. Stefansson 3

Espoo
Attendance: 2,400
Referees: Tomasz Kudlicki (POL), Apostolos Kalpakas (SWE)

25 Aug 2001
19:30

Boxscore

Ireland	69–62	Switzerland
Scoring by quarter: 19–16, 16–17, 14–18, 20–11
Pts: J. J. Larranaga, Callahan 15; Rebs: Donlon, Callahan 7 Asts: Donlon, Kennedy, Mitchell 3		Pts: Mrazek, Thürig 18; Rebs: Thürig 7 Asts: Koller 2

Dublin
Attendance: 2,000
Referees: Michel Zegwaard (NED), Gilles Bretagne (FRA)

29 Aug 2001
20:00

Boxscore

Finland	81–84	Ireland
Scoring by quarter: 26–21, 20–19, 14–25, 21–19
Pts: Möttölä 24; Rebs: Möttölä 9 Asts: Möttölä 5		Pts: J. J. Larranaga 29; Rebs: Callahan 13; Asts: Donlon 4

Salo
Attendance: 2,100
Referees: Juris Kokainis (LAT), Aare Halliko (EST)

29 Aug 2001
20:00

Boxscore

Iceland	62–79	Switzerland
Scoring by quarter: 11–19, 14–24, 19–15, 18–21
Pts: Gunnarsson 24; Rebs: F. Stefánsson 6 Asts: J. Stefansson 4		Pts: Ceresa 22; Rebs: Ceresa 8 Asts: Mrazek 6

Reykjavík
Referees: Jan Gjettermann (DEN), Oscar Lefwerth (SWE)

1 Sep 2001
17:00

Boxscore

Switzerland	67–75	Finland
Scoring by quarter: 16–16, 18–23, 17–22, 16–14
Pts: Sassella 24; Rebs: Bachmann 5 Asts: Sassella, Thürig, Bachmann 2		Pts: Luhtanen 23; Rebs: Möttölä 7 Asts: Luhtanen, Toijala 3

Bellinzona
Referees: Tonci Anzulovic (CRO), Chantal Julien (FRA)

1 Sep 2001
20:00

Boxscore

Iceland	78–84	Ireland
Scoring by quarter: 22–23, 27–20, 18–22, 11–19
Pts: F. Stefánsson 15; Rebs: F. Stefánsson 12; Asts: J. Stefansson 6		Pts: Kennedy 20; Rebs: Callahan 11; Asts: Donlon 5

Reykjavík
Referees: Jan Gjettermann (DEN), Oscar Lefwerth (SWE)

== Semi-final round ==
Qualified for EuroBasket 2003

=== Group A ===
Team	Pld	W	L	PF	PA	PD	Pts	Tie
Lithuania	10	9	1	1001	765	+236	19	
Turkey	10	7	3	810	733	+77	17	1–1 +12
Ukraine	10	7	3	834	794	+40	17	1–1 -12
Bulgaria	10	5	5	857	877	−20	15	
Switzerland	10	2	8	658	812	−154	12	
Netherlands	10	0	10	712	891	−179	10	

Rules=1) Points; 2) Head-to-head results; 3) Points difference; 4) Points scored.

21 Nov 2001
18:00

Boxscore

Turkey	84–79	Bulgaria
Scoring by quarter: 24–16, 17–28, 20–20, 23–15
Pts: Kutluay 27; Rebs: Besok 9 Asts: Tunçeri 6		Pts: Stoykov 21; Rebs: Georgiev 7 Asts: Stoykov 6

Abdi İpekçi, Istanbul
Attendance: 6,500
Referees: Fabio Facchini (ITA), Yair Michaelly (ISR)

21 Nov 2001
18:30

Boxscore

Lithuania	95–73	Netherlands
Scoring by quarter: 19–17, 29–10, 19–24, 28–22
Pts: Stombergas 19; Rebs: Javtokas 11; Asts: Jasikevicius 8		Pts: Krieger 21; Rebs: Flanders 12; Asts: Krieger 3

Sporto Rūmai, Vilnius
Attendance: 3,000
Referees: Grzegorz Ziemblicki (POL), Alexander Brown (GER)

21 Nov 2001
19:00

Boxscore

Ukraine	69–62	Switzerland
Scoring by quarter: 16–8, 16–19, 16–19, 21–16
Pts: Khryapa 15; Rebs: Iailo, Lishchuk 8 Asts: Lebediev, Khryapa 2		Pts: Valis 22; Rebs: Borter, Valis 9 Asts: Jaquier, Borter, Koller 2

Kyiv
Attendance: 2,500
Referees: Stelian Banica (ROU), Grzegorz Bachanski (POL)

24 Nov 2001
17:00

Boxscore

Bulgaria	87–105	Lithuania
Scoring by quarter: 16–30, 31–25, 20–32, 20–18
Pts: Stoykov 22; Rebs: Georgiev 9 Asts: Angelov, G. Mladenov 4		Pts: Siskauskas 25; Rebs: Javtokas 10; Asts: Siskauskas 2

Hala Diana, Jambol
Attendance: 2,500
Referees: Lazaros Voreadis (GRE), Zoran Sutulovic (MNE)

24 Nov 2001
17:30

Boxscore

Switzerland	53–70	Turkey
Scoring by quarter: 26–9, 3–18, 7–20, 17–23
Pts: Dar-Ziv 16; Rebs: Ceresa, Edwards 8 Asts: Koller 7		Pts: Kutluay 22; Rebs: Besok 10; Asts: Tunçeri 8

Fribourg
Attendance: 2,400
Referees: Luciano Tola (ITA), Sinisa Herceg (CRO)

24 Nov 2001
19:30

Boxscore

Netherlands	68–84	Ukraine
Scoring by quarter: 18–29, 14–11, 19–18, 17–26
Pts: Krieger 15; Rebs: Flanders 5 Asts: De Vries, Vrind 2		Pts: Khryapa 17; Rebs: Khryapa 10; Asts: Lebediev, Korablov 2

Amsterdam
Referees: Dale Aitcheson (ENG), Daniel Hierrezuelo (ESP)

28 Nov 2001
17:00

Boxscore

Bulgaria	91–80	Netherlands
Scoring by quarter: 33–24, 18–18, 21–24, 19–14
Pts: G. Mladenov 33; Rebs: Georgiev, B. Mladenov 6 Asts: Stoykov 5		Pts: Krieger 20; Rebs: Flanders, Vrind 9 Asts: Krieger 2

Hala Diana, Jambol
Attendance: 3,000
Referees: Ladislav Janac (SVK), Dragan Neskovic (SRB)

28 Nov 2001
18:00

Boxscore

Turkey	80–67	Ukraine
Scoring by quarter: 26–12, 16–17, 13–17, 25–21
Pts: Kutluay, Okur 16; Rebs: Okur 12; Asts: Tunçeri 7		Pts: Iailo 19; Rebs: Okunskyy 12; Asts: Rayevskyy 6

Abdi İpekçi, Istanbul
Attendance: 11,500
Referees: Petr Sudek (SVK), Yaron Zarif (ISR)

28 Nov 2001
18:30

Boxscore

Lithuania	93–47	Switzerland
Scoring by quarter: 23–10, 18–15, 29–7, 23–15
Pts: Siskauskas 16; Rebs: Jasikevicius 7 Asts: Jasikevicius 9		Pts: Valis 19; Rebs: Valis, Edwards 7 Asts: Koller 4

Sporto Rūmai, Vilnius
Attendance: 3,000
Referees: Tomasz Kudlicki (POL), Oscar Lefwerth (SWE)

23 Jan 2002
18:30

Boxscore

Ukraine	89–82	Lithuania
Scoring by quarter: 23–21, 26–27, 25–20, 15–14
Pts: Okunskyy 22; Rebs: Okunskyy 12; Asts: Iailo, Okunskyy 5		Pts: Siskauskas 24; Rebs: E. Zukauskas 9 Asts: Jasikevicius, E. Zukauskas 3

Palace of Sports, Kyiv
Attendance: 6,200
Referees: Aliaksandr Yarotski (BLR), Andrei Bostan (MDA)

23 Jan 2002
19:30

Boxscore

Netherlands	73–89	Turkey
Scoring by quarter: 22–23, 14–18, 21–23, 16–25
Pts: Huijbens 20; Rebs: Vrind 7 Asts: Krieger 6		Pts: Erdenay 26; Rebs: Gönlüm, Yildirim 7 Asts: Tunçeri 5

Maaspoort, 's-Hertogenbosch
Attendance: 2,300
Referees: Armand De Keyser (BEL), Ladislav Janac (SVK)

23 Jan 2002
20:30

Boxscore

Switzerland	83–88	Bulgaria
Scoring by quarter: 19–19, 26–22, 14–25, 24–22
Pts: H. Mrazek 35; Rebs: Polite 7 Asts: Koller 8		Pts: Stoykov 23; Rebs: Georgiev 5 Asts: Angelov, Stoykov 4

Geneva
Referees: Antonio Coelho (POR), Andrej Lovsin (SLO)

26 Jan 2002
16:00

Boxscore

Bulgaria	109–86	Ukraine
Scoring by quarter: 35–22, 18–17, 26–24, 30–23
Pts: Stoykov 30; Rebs: Angelov 11; Asts: G. Mladenov 10		Pts: Iailo 21; Rebs: Iailo 8 Asts: Ievstratenko 3

Hala Diana, Jambol
Attendance: 3,000
Referees: Nikolaos Karoussis (GRE), Sinisa Herceg (CRO)

26 Jan 2002
18:30

Boxscore

Lithuania	100–62	Turkey
Scoring by quarter: 26–16, 21–19, 22–12, 31–15
Pts: E. Zukauskas 19; Rebs: E. Zukauskas 12; Asts: Jasikevicius 5		Pts: Okur 16; Rebs: Okur 9 Asts: Tunçeri 3

Sporto Rūmai, Vilnius
Attendance: 3,050
Referees: Markus Hesse (GER), Neil Wilkinson (ENG)

26 Jan 2002
20:30

Boxscore

Switzerland	81–64	Netherlands
Scoring by quarter: 28–19, 25–8, 10–26, 18–11
Pts: Y. Mrazek 19; Rebs: Ceresa 8 Asts: Y. Mrazek 6		Pts: Krieger 20; Rebs: Vrind 9 Asts: Krieger 5

Geneva
Referees: Alberto Grossi (ITA), Roman Kolar (SLO)

20 Nov 2002
18:00

Boxscore

Bulgaria	78–82	Turkey
Scoring by quarter: 24–16, 15–21, 17–20, 22–25
Pts: G. Mladenov, Angelov 13; Rebs: Angelov 5 Asts: G. Mladenov 3		Pts: Kutluay, Besok 28; Rebs: Besok 8 Asts: Tunçeri 3

Hala Diana, Yambol
Attendance: 2,500
Referees: Shmuel Bachar (ISR), Gianluca Mattioli (ITA)

20 Nov 2002
19:00

Boxscore

Switzerland	69–93	Ukraine
Scoring by quarter: 18–27, 12–24, 23–20, 16–22
Pts: Valis 15; Rebs: Ceresa 5 Asts: H. Mrazek, Ceresa 2		Pts: Drozdov 26; Rebs: Okunskyy 13; Asts: Lebediev, Okunskyy, Kozorez, Botichev 1

Tenero
Attendance: 1,000
Referees: Ivo Dolinek (CZE), Paolo Taurino (ITA)

20 Nov 2002
20:00

Boxscore

Netherlands	74–88	Lithuania
Scoring by quarter: 24–24, 9–24, 23–20, 18–20
Pts: Elson 30; Rebs: Hammink 12; Asts: Hammink 6		Pts: Siskauskas 21; Rebs: Macijauskas 9 Asts: M. Zukauskas, Kazevicius 3

Rotterdam
Referees: Richard Stokes (ENG), Grzegorz Ziemblicki (POL)

23 Nov 2002
18:30

Boxscore

Lithuania	117–72	Bulgaria
Scoring by quarter: 18–22, 32–15, 29–15, 38–20
Pts: Macijauskas 28; Rebs: Stombergas 7 Asts: Jasikevicius 6		Pts: Stoykov 18; Rebs: B. Mladenov 7 Asts: Stoykov 3

Sporto Rūmai, Vilnius
Attendance: 2,500
Referees: Fedor Dmitriev (BLR), Petri Mäntylä (FIN)

23 Nov 2002
19:00

Boxscore

Ukraine	88–62	Netherlands
Scoring by quarter: 23–25, 22–14, 29–6, 14–17
Pts: Drozdov 28; Rebs: Lokhmanchuk 10; Asts: Okunskyy 6		Pts: Mims 23; Rebs: Mims 10; Asts: Krieger, Van der Holst 3

Kyiv
Attendance: 1,500
Referees: Marian Oprea (ROU), Grzegorz Bachanski (POL)

23 Nov 2002
19:00

Boxscore

Turkey	64–40	Switzerland
Scoring by quarter: 12–8, 21–11, 14–14, 17–7
Pts: Kutluay 18; Rebs: Besok 7 Asts: Tunçeri 4		Pts: Edwards 17; Rebs: Valis 10; Asts: Sassella 3

Abdi İpekçi, Istanbul
Attendance: 5,500
Referees: Ademir Zurapovic (BIH), Milija Vojinovic (SRB)

27 Nov 2002
19:00

Boxscore

Ukraine	74–73	Turkey
Scoring by quarter: 16–18, 22–15, 14–15, 22–25
Pts: Lokhmanchuk 17; Rebs: Lokhmanchuk 9 Asts: Lebediev 2		Pts: Kutluay 34; Rebs: Türkcan 11; Asts: Türkcan, Acik, Kutluay 1

Palace of Sports, Kyiv
Attendance: 5,000
Referees: Ladislav Janac (SVK), Milivoje Jovcic (SRB)

27 Nov 2002
19:00

Boxscore

Switzerland	64–110	Lithuania
Scoring by quarter: 12–29, 20–19, 20–35, 12–27
Pts: Sassella 14; Rebs: Valis 5 Asts: Ceresa 2		Pts: Macijauskas 24; Rebs: E. Zukauskas 11; Asts: Macijauskas, Kaukenas 2

Tenero
Attendance: 1,200
Referees: Giampaolo Cicoria (ITA), Roman Kolar (SLO)

27 Nov 2002
20:00

Boxscore

Netherlands	77–86	Bulgaria
Scoring by quarter: 20–19, 15–22, 15–26, 27–19
Pts: Elson 25; Rebs: Elson 11; Asts: Elson 3		Pts: Stoykov 24; Rebs: Minchev, Angelov, H. Dimitrov 7 Asts: Stoykov 4

Nijmegen
Referees: Ivan Zachara (CZE), Björn Braathen (NOR)

22 Jan 2003
18:00

Boxscore

Turkey	107–67	Netherlands
Scoring by quarter: 26–12, 27–19, 16–14, 38–22
Pts: Kutluay 27; Rebs: Türkcan 12; Asts: Acik 7		Pts: Hammink 19; Rebs: Hammink 7 Asts: Krieger 3

Abdi İpekçi, Istanbul
Attendance: 11,300
Referees: Milivoje Jovcic (SRB), Petar Obradovic (BIH)

22 Jan 2003
18:00

Boxscore

Bulgaria	87–77	Switzerland
Scoring by quarter: 22–21, 25–20, 19–19, 21–17
Pts: Angelov 23; Rebs: Angelov 8 Asts: Angelov 9		Pts: H. Mrazek 23; Rebs: Edwards 5 Asts: H. Mrazek 4

Universiada, Sofia
Attendance: 3,000
Referees: Ivan Zachara (CZE), Milija Vojinovic (SRB)

22 Jan 2003
19:00

Boxscore

Lithuania	109–98	Ukraine
Scoring by quarter: 27–17, 22–25, 42–25, 18–31
Pts: Jasikevicius 27; Rebs: E. Zukauskas 8 Asts: Jasikevicius 6		Pts: Lokhmanchuk 19; Rebs: Okunskyy 7 Asts: Okunskyy 3

Sports Hall, Kaunas
Attendance: 2,500
Referees: Aliaksandr Yarotski (BLR), Andrei Bostan (MDA)

25 Jan 2003
15:00

Boxscore

Netherlands	74–82	Switzerland
Scoring by quarter: 14–31, 19–18, 18–17, 23–16
Pts: Cortenraede, Elson, Vrind 12; Rebs: Vrind 11; Asts: Krieger, Elson 3		Pts: Dar-Ziv 27; Rebs: Dar-Ziv, Thürig 6 Asts: Jaquier 5

Rotterdam
Referees: Jens Staudenmayer (GER), Marc Hesters (BEL)

25 Jan 2003
18:00

Boxscore

Turkey	99–102 (OT)	Lithuania
Scoring by quarter: 15–25, 20–17, 26–22, 28–25, Overtime: 10–13
Pts: Türkcan 25; Rebs: Türkcan 12; Asts: Türkcan 5		Pts: Macijauskas 29; Rebs: Macijauskas 9 Asts: Jasikevicius 7

Abdi İpekçi, Istanbul
Attendance: 11,300
Referees: Alberto Grossi (ITA), Yaron Zarif (ISR)

25 Jan 2003
19:00

Boxscore

Ukraine	86–80	Bulgaria
Scoring by quarter: 23–16, 19–25, 22–22, 22–17
Pts: Khryapa, Lokhmanchuk 20; Rebs: Khryapa 13; Asts: Lokhmanchuk 7		Pts: Stoykov 20; Rebs: Angelov 6 Asts: G. Mladenov 4

Palace of Sports, Kyiv
Attendance: 5,500
Referees: Lazaros Voreadis (GRE), Stelian Banica (ROU)

=== Group B ===
Team	Pld	W	L	PF	PA	PD	Pts	Tie
Greece	10	9	1	889	637	+252	19	1–1 +10
Spain	10	9	1	866	685	+181	19	1–1 -10
Israel	10	5	5	738	707	+31	15	
Romania	10	4	6	657	804	−147	14	
Belgium	10	3	7	663	751	−88	13	
Denmark	10	0	10	603	832	−229	10	

Rules=1) Points; 2) Head-to-head results; 3) Points difference; 4) Points scored.

21 Nov 2001
18:00

Boxscore

Spain	90–52	Romania
Scoring by quarter: 30–10, 16–19, 23–10, 21–13
Pts: Reyes Cabanas, Garbajosa 17; Rebs: Reyes Cabanas 9 Asts: Rodriguez Marín, Garbajosa 5		Pts: Stanescu 12; Rebs: Popescu 9 Asts: Helcioiu 3

Ciudad Deportiva Principe Felipe, Arganda del Rey
Attendance: 3,500
Referees: Valdemar Cabral (POR), Chantal Julien (FRA)

21 Nov 2001
19:15

Boxscore

Greece	88–49	Belgium
Scoring by quarter: 24–15, 18–10, 25–15, 21–9
Pts: Rentzias 20; Rebs: Dikoudis 13; Asts: Sigalas 6		Pts: Desaever, Stas 14; Rebs: Potter 11; Asts: Stas 3

Chalkida Indoor Hall, Chalkida
Attendance: 1,500
Referees: Tihomir Bubalo (SRB), Giampaolo Cicoria (ITA)

21 Nov 2001
21:00

Boxscore

Israel	89–78	Denmark
Scoring by quarter: 18–9, 20–25, 22–17, 29–27
Pts: Burstein 21; Rebs: Green 8 Asts: Tapiro 5		Pts: Andersen 26; Rebs: Andersen 9 Asts: Thuesen 4

Sports Palace, Tel Aviv
Attendance: 9,000
Referees: Vladimir Atanasov (BUL), Christakis Papadamou (CYP)

24 Nov 2001
16:00

Boxscore

Denmark	66–96	Spain
Scoring by quarter: 16–30, 17–23, 10–24, 23–19
Pts: Drejer 24; Rebs: Andersen 8 Asts: Thuesen 5		Pts: Navarro 20; Rebs: Dueñas Hernandez, Garbajosa 7 Asts: Rodriguez Marín 5

K.B. Hallen, Frederiksberg
Attendance: 2,000
Referees: Arnis Ozols (LAT), Markus Grievink (GER)

24 Nov 2001
20:00

Boxscore

Romania	60–92	Greece
Scoring by quarter: 15–23, 15–24, 19–22, 11–23
Pts: Stanescu 15; Rebs: Stanescu 7 Asts: Alexe 3		Pts: Rentzias 22; Rebs: Alvertis 6 Asts: Papaloukas 10

Bucharest
Attendance: 1,800
Referees: Volodymyr Drabikovskyi (UKR), Milivoje Jovcic (SRB)

25 Nov 2001
15:00

Boxscore

Belgium	69–75	Israel
Scoring by quarter: 22–21, 14–10, 15–25, 18–19
Pts: Potter 14; Rebs: Potter 11; Asts: Stas 6		Pts: Shelef 24; Rebs: Green 11; Asts: Tapiro 3

Country Hall, Liège
Attendance: 3,000
Referees: Pascal Dorizon (FRA), Neil Wilkinson (ENG)

28 Nov 2001
19:15

Boxscore

Greece	103–63	Denmark
Scoring by quarter: 24–19, 21–11, 25–18, 33–15
Pts: Alvertis 30; Rebs: Rentzias 10; Asts: Papaloukas 11		Pts: Andersen 27; Rebs: Andersen 9 Asts: Qwist 3

Livadia
Attendance: 2,000
Referees: Alberto Grossi (ITA), Chrysanthos Christodoulou (CYP)

28 Nov 2001
19:30

Boxscore

Romania	74–69	Belgium
Scoring by quarter: 12–18, 27–16, 20–22, 15–13
Pts: Alexe 18; Rebs: Ciosici 13; Asts: Stanescu, Alexe, Popescu 2		Pts: Mwandwe 15; Rebs: Dupont 10; Asts: Stas 6

Bucharest
Attendance: 2,000
Referees: Mehmet Keseratar (TUR), Caslav Cukalovic (SRB)

28 Nov 2001
20:00

Boxscore

Spain	88–74	Israel
Scoring by quarter: 15–22, 33–16, 21–15, 19–21
Pts: Garbajosa 20; Rebs: Garbajosa 10; Asts: Rodriguez Marín, L. Angulo Espinosa 3		Pts: Green 19; Rebs: Green 7 Asts: Shelef 4

Vistalegre, Madrid
Attendance: 15,000
Referees: Goran Radonjic (FRA), Giampaolo Cicoria (ITA)

23 Jan 2002
19:00

Boxscore

Denmark	75–76	Romania
Scoring by quarter: 20–14, 19–17, 19–20, 17–25
Pts: Drejer 31; Rebs: Larsen, Qwist 6 Asts: Drejer, Larsen 3		Pts: Stanescu 21; Rebs: Popescu 10; Asts: Alexe, Popescu 3

Risskov
Attendance: 2,050
Referees: Marek Nowicki (POL), Richard Stokes (ENG)

23 Jan 2002
23:30

Boxscore

Belgium	63–78	Spain
Scoring by quarter: 16–21, 21–18, 7–27, 19–12
Pts: Stas 16; Rebs: Dupont 6 Asts: Lauwers 2		Pts: Garbajosa 18; Rebs: Reyes Cabanas 7 Asts: L. Angulo Espinosa 5

Angleur
Attendance: 1,200
Referees: Petr Sudek (SVK), Markus Grievink (GER)

23 Jan 2002
21:00

Boxscore

Israel	73–74	Greece
Scoring by quarter: 22–14, 16–19, 19–18, 16–23
Pts: Saffar 19; Rebs: Lubin 9 Asts: Lubin, Burstein 3		Pts: Alvertis 19; Rebs: Rentzias 9 Asts: Sigalas 2

Sports Palace, Tel Aviv
Attendance: 9,000
Referees: Fabio Facchini (ITA), Ilija Belosevic (SRB)

26 Jan 2002
16:00

Boxscore

Denmark	60–73	Belgium
Scoring by quarter: 16–18, 16–19, 10–16, 18–20
Pts: Jensen 15; Rebs: Larsen 6 Asts: Drejer, Colman 3		Pts: Desaever, Cleymans 14; Rebs: Dupont 9 Asts: Desaever 5

Fredericia
Attendance: 1,200
Referees: Hermann Latz (GER), John Hammervoll (NOR)

26 Jan 2002
17:00

Boxscore

Romania	56–72	Israel
Scoring by quarter: 11–14, 19–12, 13–30, 13–16
Pts: Popescu 17; Rebs: Stanescu 11; Asts: Alexe 10		Pts: Shelef 20; Rebs: Shelef 6 Asts: Shelef 5

Horia Demian, Cluj-Napoca
Attendance: 2,600
Referees: Dragan Neskovic (SRB), Peter Bodnar (HUN)

26 Jan 2002
17:40

Boxscore

Greece	86–73	Spain
Scoring by quarter: 20–14, 18–19, 22–14, 26–26
Pts: Alvertis 19; Rebs: Rentzias 16; Asts: Sigalas 4		Pts: Garbajosa 18; Rebs: Garbajosa 11; Asts: Mumbru 3

Andreas Papandreu, Athens
Attendance: 5,000
Referees: Stefano Cazzaro (ITA), Virginijus Dovidavicius (LTU)

20 Nov 2002
17:00

Boxscore

Romania	70–96	Spain
Scoring by quarter: 14–30, 15–28, 25–18, 16–20
Pts: Lapuste 21; Rebs: Popescu 8 Asts: Helcioiu, Alexe 3		Pts: Navarro 19; Rebs: Garbajosa 8 Asts: Marco Viñas, Garbajosa 2

Horia Demian, Cluj Napoca
Attendance: 3,000
Referees: Tihomir Bubalo (SRB), György Varadi (HUN)

20 Nov 2002
18:00

Boxscore

Denmark	48–66	Israel
Scoring by quarter: 12–13, 16–16, 14–21, 6–16
Pts: Andersen 14; Rebs: Andersen 9 Asts: Colman 5		Pts: Sharp 19; Rebs: Kozikaro, Green 7 Asts: Lubin, Tapiro 3

Vejle
Attendance: 1,156
Referees: Markus Hesse (GER), Neil Wilkinson (ENG)

20 Nov 2002
20:30

Boxscore

Belgium	59–92	Greece
Scoring by quarter: 11–23, 17–26, 16–20, 15–23
Pts: Stas 12; Rebs: Beghin 6 Asts: Sambwe-Lunkamba Tshomba 3		Pts: Fotsis 20; Rebs: Fotsis 6 Asts: Tsartsaris 4

Angleur
Referees: Ladislav Janac (SVK), Dale Aitcheson (ENG)

23 Nov 2002
13:45

Boxscore

Spain	87–46	Denmark
Scoring by quarter: 17–8, 21–19, 32–5, 17–14
Pts: Hernandez-Sonseca 17; Rebs: Hernandez-Sonseca 9 Asts: Marco Viñas 4		Pts: Andersen 19; Rebs: Andersen 10; Asts: Colman, Andersen 2

Madrid
Attendance: 3,000
Referees: Valdemar Cabral (POR), Nicolas Maestre (FRA)

23 Nov 2002
18:00

Boxscore

Greece	103–45	Romania
Scoring by quarter: 23–18, 30–7, 23–17, 27–3
Pts: Papanikolaou 21; Rebs: Papadopoulos, Tsartsaris 9 Asts: Sigalas, Fotsis 3		Pts: Popescu 13; Rebs: Popescu 7 Asts: Alexe 3

Athens
Attendance: 3,000
Referees: Vladimir Atanasov (BUL), Antonis Demetriou (CYP)

24 Nov 2002
21:00

Boxscore

Israel	66–67	Belgium
Scoring by quarter: 19–12, 21–22, 12–22, 14–11
Pts: Shelef 16; Rebs: Shelef 6 Asts: Tapiro 4		Pts: Van Den Spiegel 18; Rebs: Beghin, Van Den Spiegel 11; Asts: Stas 4

Sports Palace, Tel Aviv
Attendance: 7,000
Referees: Chrysanthos Christodoulou (CYP), Tolga Sahin (ITA)

27 Nov 2002
19:00

Boxscore

Denmark	60–75	Greece
Scoring by quarter: 15–22, 15–23, 11–16, 19–14
Pts: Andersen 17; Rebs: Andersen 8 Asts: Thuesen, Jensen 3		Pts: Fotsis 15; Rebs: Fotsis 6 Asts: Sigalas, Fotsis 3

Risskov
Attendance: 2,404
Referees: Ilkka Weijo (FIN), Oscar Lefwerth (SWE)

27 Nov 2002
20:30

Boxscore

Belgium	69–73	Romania
Scoring by quarter: 20–13, 23–17, 13–20, 13–23
Pts: Desaever 18; Rebs: Van Den Spiegel 8 Asts: Stas 4		Pts: Popescu 22; Rebs: Stanescu 8 Asts: Alexe 4

Angleur
Referees: Jan Herweijer (NED), Tomas Jasevicius (LTU)

27 Nov 2002
21:00

Boxscore

Israel	71–79	Spain
Scoring by quarter: 13–18, 22–21, 19–16, 17–24
Pts: Burstein 15; Rebs: Shelef 4 Asts: Lubin, Tapiro, Green 2		Pts: Paraiso Gonzalez 22; Rebs: Garbajosa 8 Asts: Marco Viñas 5

Sports Palace, Tel Aviv
Attendance: 10,000
Referees: Stefano Cazzaro (ITA), Sasa Pukl (SLO)

22 Jan 2003
17:00

Boxscore

Romania	88–47	Denmark
Scoring by quarter: 22–11, 13–9, 23–13, 30–14
Pts: Popescu 30; Rebs: Stanescu 16; Asts: Helcioiu 3		Pts: Laulund 16; Rebs: Kingombe 8 Asts: Larsen 2

Horia Demian, Cluj Napoca
Attendance: 2,000
Referees: Marjan Stojovski (MKD), Vladimir Tsekov (BUL)

22 Jan 2003
18:00

Boxscore

Greece	85–61	Israel
Scoring by quarter: 25–19, 17–7, 21–21, 22–14
Pts: Dikoudis 22; Rebs: Diamantidis, Fotsis 7 Asts: Diamantidis 4		Pts: Sharp 17; Rebs: Marckovich, Shelef, Saffar 4 Asts: Lubin 3

Athens
Attendance: 3,000
Referees: Petr Sudek (SVK), Gianluca Mattioli (ITA)

22 Jan 2003
20:30

Boxscore

Spain	85–66	Belgium
Scoring by quarter: 30–11, 18–17, 23–17, 14–21
Pts: Reyes 24; Rebs: Reyes 9 Asts: Reyes, L. Angulo Espinosa 3		Pts: Desaever 17; Rebs: Buja 7 Asts: Moors 3

Murcia
Attendance: 4,000
Referees: Philippe Leemann (SUI), Keith Williams (ENG)

25 Jan 2003
13:30

Boxscore

Spain	94–91	Greece
Scoring by quarter: 20–23, 24–24, 27–26, 23–18
Pts: Navarro 30; Rebs: Reyes 15; Asts: Marco Viñas 5		Pts: Fotsis 22; Rebs: Dikoudis 9 Asts: Papaloukas, Sigalas, Fotsis 4

Leon
Attendance: 6,400
Referees: Giampaolo Cicoria (ITA), Anibal Castano (FRA)

25 Jan 2003
20:00

Boxscore

Belgium	79–60	Denmark
Scoring by quarter: 16–15, 24–18, 12–16, 27–11
Pts: Desaever 19; Rebs: Jorssen 6 Asts: Desaever 2		Pts: Langvad 15; Rebs: Laulund 5 Asts: Jakobsen 3

Angleur
Attendance: 2,200
Referees: Robert Hickman (ENG), Nicolaas Zwiep (NED)

25 Jan 2003
21:00

Boxscore

Israel	91–63	Romania
Scoring by quarter: 28–12, 15–12, 20–25, 28–14
Pts: Lubin 23; Rebs: Burstein 5 Asts: Lubin 4		Pts: Stanescu 20; Rebs: Stanescu 11; Asts: Szijarto 4

Sports Palace, Tel-Aviv
Attendance: 5,500
Referees: Mehmet Keseratar (TUR), Antonis Demetriou (CYP)

=== Group C ===
Team	Pld	W	L	PF	PA	PD	Pts
Germany	10	9	1	833	709	+124	19
Croatia	10	8	2	834	724	+110	18
Bosnia and Herzegovina	10	6	4	827	748	+79	16
Macedonia	10	4	6	816	810	+6	14
Ireland	10	3	7	754	815	−61	13
Cyprus	10	0	10	645	902	−257	10

21 Nov 2001
17:00

Boxscore

Bosnia and Herzegovina	92–53	Cyprus
Scoring by quarter: 19–10, 19–10, 25–17, 29–16
Pts: Firic 16; Rebs: Firic, Mujezinovic 7 Asts: Ovcina 5		Pts: Anastasiadis 15; Rebs: Fowlkes, Kaskiris 3 Asts: Stylianides, Serdaris 2

Sarajevo
Attendance: 1,500
Referees: Doru Vinasi (ROU), Miroslav Tomov (BUL)

21 Nov 2001
17:30

Boxscore

Croatia	91–72	Macedonia
Scoring by quarter: 23–18, 19–24, 23–10, 26–20
Pts: Giricek 28; Rebs: Vujcic 19; Asts: Anzulovic 7		Pts: Gečevski 16; Rebs: Bocevski 10; Asts: Stefanov 5

Krizevci
Attendance: 2,000
Referees: Luigi Lamonica (ITA), Roman Kolar (SLO)

21 Nov 2001
19:00

Boxscore

Germany	85–77	Ireland
Scoring by quarter: 27–15, 17–9, 21–29, 20–24
Pts: Femerling 18; Rebs: Okulaja 8 Asts: Pesic 5		Pts: Mitchell, Conlon 25; Rebs: Conlon 6 Asts: Donlon 5

Godehardhalle, Göttingen
Attendance: 3,400
Referees: Jan Herweijer (NED), Virginijus Dovidavicius (LTU)

24 Nov 2001
17:00

Boxscore

Cyprus	63–90	Germany
Scoring by quarter: 17–17, 13–32, 18–26, 15–15
Pts: Anastasiadis 14; Rebs: Kaskiris 8 Asts: Kostekoglou, Michail 1		Pts: Schultze 21; Rebs: Hupmann, Papic 8 Asts: Tomic 4

Nicosia
Attendance: 1,500
Referees: Shmuel Bachar (ISR), Zlatin Karanikolov (BUL)

24 Nov 2001
19:00

Boxscore

Ireland	76–78	Croatia
Scoring by quarter: 21–17, 21–25, 25–13, 9–23
Pts: J. J. Larranaga, Conlon 21; Rebs: Conlon 8 Asts: Fulton 4		Pts: Marcelic 19; Rebs: Skelin 6 Asts: Anzulovic, Popovic 3

Dublin
Attendance: 3,000
Referees: Gilles Bretagne (FRA), Anibal Castano (FRA)

24 Nov 2001
20:00

Boxscore

Macedonia	101–92 (OT)	Bosnia and Herzegovina
Scoring by quarter: 27–23, 15–24, 16–22, 26–15, Overtime: 17–8
Pts: Naumoski 28; Rebs: Gečevski 12; Asts: Naumoski 5		Pts: Mujezinovic 31; Rebs: Hukic, Kovacevic 8 Asts: Ovcina 2

Skopje
Attendance: 2,000
Referees: Andrej Jelen (SLO), Murat Biricik (TUR)

28 Nov 2001
19:00

Boxscore

Croatia	90–61	Cyprus
Scoring by quarter: 22–16, 21–12, 25–11, 22–22
Pts: Marcelic 21; Rebs: Skelin 9 Asts: Anzulovic 7		Pts: Trisokkas 13; Rebs: Kaskiris 5 Asts: Stylianides 2

Belišće
Attendance: 1,600
Referees: György Varadi (HUN), Erich Kratschmer (AUT)

28 Nov 2001
19:00

Boxscore

Ireland	75–68	Macedonia
Scoring by quarter: 13–19, 9–19, 24–9, 29–21
Pts: Mitchell 17; Rebs: Conlon 8 Asts: Donlon 7		Pts: Naumoski 14; Rebs: Gečevski 11; Asts: Stefanov, Naumoski 5

Dublin
Attendance: 2,000
Referees: Leifur Gardarsson (ISL), Nicolas Maestre (FRA)

28 Nov 2001
19:30

Boxscore

Germany	76–84	Bosnia and Herzegovina
Scoring by quarter: 19–22, 18–19, 24–16, 15–27
Pts: Femerling 17; Rebs: Femerling 10; Asts: Pesic, Okulaja, Femerling 4		Pts: Firic 24; Rebs: Firic 15; Asts: Firic 4

Dortmund
Attendance: 5,800
Referees: Serge De Coster (BEL), Gianluca Mattioli (ITA)

23 Jan 2002
19:00

Boxscore

Cyprus	67–74	Ireland
Scoring by quarter: 14–14, 14–13, 18–20, 21–27
Pts: Anastasiadis, Trisokkas 15; Rebs: Trisokkas 13; Asts: Palalas, Fowlkes 3		Pts: Sekunda 31; Rebs: Conlon 6 Asts: Donlon 5

Limassol
Attendance: 1,200
Referees: Alberto Grossi (ITA), Vladimir Atanasov (BUL)

23 Jan 2002
20:00

Boxscore

Macedonia	74–80	Germany
Scoring by quarter: 19–22, 20–25, 23–17, 12–16
Pts: Naumoski 25; Rebs: Gečevski 9 Asts: Naumoski, Jovanovski 2		Pts: Okulaja 23; Rebs: Femerling 7 Asts: Roller 2

Ohrid
Attendance: 3,000
Referees: Gennaro Colucci (ITA), Dimitar Gologanov (BUL)

23 Jan 2002
20:15

Boxscore

Bosnia and Herzegovina	65–95	Croatia
Scoring by quarter: 15–26, 14–20, 19–28, 17–21
Pts: Hukic 18; Rebs: Ovcina 8 Asts: Mrsic 2		Pts: Giricek 21; Rebs: Skelin 5 Asts: Anzulovic, Marcelic 3

Skenderija, Sarajevo
Attendance: 8,000
Referees: Nikolaos Pitsilkas (GRE), Luigi Lamonica (ITA)

26 Jan 2002
15:00

Boxscore

Ireland	59–74	Bosnia and Herzegovina
Scoring by quarter: 15–16, 11–24, 19–15, 14–19
Pts: Sekunda 20; Rebs: Conlon 11; Asts: Sekunda 3		Pts: Hukic, Mrsic 20; Rebs: Hukic 13; Asts: Castle 3

Dublin
Attendance: 3,000
Referees: Daniel Hierrezuelo (ESP), Jose Magalhaes (POR)

26 Jan 2002
17:00

Boxscore

Cyprus	63–93	Macedonia
Scoring by quarter: 16–18, 13–23, 21–22, 13–30
Pts: Trisokkas 24; Rebs: Trisokkas 7 Asts: Kostekoglou 3		Pts: Naumoski 29; Rebs: Gečevski 13; Asts: Ilievski, Srbinovski 2

Nicosia
Referees: Yair Michaelly (ISR), Gianluca Mattioli (ITA)

26 Jan 2002
21:15

Boxscore

Croatia	71–78	Germany
Scoring by quarter: 22–19, 14–11, 17–26, 18–22
Pts: Giricek 23; Rebs: Skelin 15; Asts: Anzulovic 5		Pts: Okulaja 22; Rebs: Okulaja 7 Asts: Okulaja 2

Dubrovnik
Attendance: 2,000
Referees: Giampaolo Cicoria (ITA), Tolga Sahin (ITA)

20 Nov 2002
18:30

Boxscore

Macedonia	85–93	Croatia
Scoring by quarter: 20–30, 23–24, 24–22, 18–17
Pts: Naumoski 23; Rebs: Jones 14; Asts: Stefanov 2		Pts: Mulaomerovic, Kovacic 23; Rebs: Kovacic 10; Asts: Mulaomerovic 2

Ohrid
Referees: Sasa Pukl (SLO), Moise Bitton (ISR)

20 Nov 2002
19:00

Boxscore

Cyprus	56–95	Bosnia and Herzegovina
Scoring by quarter: 11–21, 12–27, 15–26, 18–21
Pts: Roundy 13; Rebs: Roundy 9 Asts: Yiannas 2		Pts: Hukic 24; Rebs: Krupalija 8 Asts: Markovic Zoric 6

Nicosia
Attendance: 1,000
Referees: Yaron Zarif (ISR), Zlatin Karanikolov (BUL)

20 Nov 2002
19:00

Boxscore

Ireland	71–80	Germany
Scoring by quarter: 13–23, 17–17, 19–18, 22–22
Pts: Bowdler 26; Rebs: Callahan 10; Asts: J. J. Larranaga 3		Pts: Okulaja 17; Rebs: Okulaja 6 Asts: Demirel 6

Dublin
Attendance: 2,000
Referees: Gennaro Colucci (ITA), Jan Gjettermann (DEN)

23 Nov 2002
18:00

Boxscore

Croatia	87–69	Ireland
Scoring by quarter: 16–14, 21–19, 36–18, 14–18
Pts: Mulaomerovic 17; Rebs: Vujcic 10; Asts: Mulaomerovic 6		Pts: Bowdler 25; Rebs: Callahan 9 Asts: J. J. Larranaga 5

Zagreb
Attendance: 2,000
Referees: Andrej Lovsin (SLO), Fabio Facchini (ITA)

23 Nov 2002
18:30

Boxscore

Germany	94–42	Cyprus
Scoring by quarter: 25–18, 19–4, 29–10, 21–10
Pts: Okulaja 24; Rebs: Arigbabu 8 Asts: Pesic 9		Pts: Roundy 10; Rebs: Roundy 9 Asts: Yiannas, Serdaris 2

Dessau
Attendance: 3,500
Referees: Christoph Holzner (AUT), Tomasz Kudlicki (POL)

23 Nov 2002
20:15

Boxscore

Bosnia and Herzegovina	93–79	Macedonia
Scoring by quarter: 24–15, 20–22, 27–24, 22–18
Pts: Markovic Zoric 33; Rebs: Ovcina, Krupalija 7 Asts: Markovic Zoric, Mrsic 3		Pts: Ilievski 19; Rebs: Čekovski 4 Asts: Ilievski, Jovanovski 2

Mejdan, Tuzla
Attendance: 5,000
Referees: Sinisa Herceg (CRO), Peter Bodnar (HUN)

27 Nov 2002
18:30

Boxscore

Macedonia	83–72	Ireland
Scoring by quarter: 22–17, 22–13, 24–21, 15–21
Pts: Jones 21; Rebs: Simić 6 Asts: Stefanov 7		Pts: Callahan 24; Rebs: Callahan 9 Asts: J. J. Larranaga 6

Ohrid
Attendance: 1,500
Referees: Kestutis Pilipauskas (LTU), Vladimir Tsekov (BUL)

27 Nov 2002
19:00

Boxscore

Cyprus	76–87	Croatia
Scoring by quarter: 22–28, 18–20, 12–19, 24–20
Pts: Roundy 19; Rebs: Roundy 7 Asts: Palalas 3		Pts: Bazdaric 21; Rebs: Vujcic 9 Asts: Planinic 3

Nicosia
Referees: Stelian Banica (ROU), Georgios Tanatzis (GRE)

27 Nov 2002
20:15

Boxscore

Bosnia and Herzegovina	76–83	Germany
Scoring by quarter: 22–24, 15–30, 13–11, 26–18
Pts: Hukic 22; Rebs: Krupalija 5 Asts: Castle 5		Pts: Okulaja 22; Rebs: Okulaja 7 Asts: Okulaja 3

Skenderija, Sarajevo
Attendance: 7,000
Referees: Lazaros Voreadis (GRE), Tolga Sahin (ITA)

22 Jan 2003
19:00

Boxscore

Germany	86–78	Macedonia
Scoring by quarter: 24–12, 21–20, 18–21, 23–25
Pts: Okulaja 15; Rebs: Femerling 6 Asts: Willoughby 3		Pts: Ilievski 29; Rebs: Jones 14; Asts: Jones 3

Koblenz
Attendance: 3,500
Referees: Grzegorz Ziemblicki (POL), Tomas Jasevicius (LTU)

22 Jan 2003
19:15

Boxscore

Ireland	104–99 (OT)	Cyprus
Scoring by quarter: 23–17, 27–19, 16–15, 13–28, Overtime: 9–9, 16–11
Pts: Bowdler 30; Rebs: Bowdler 11; Asts: J. J. Larranaga 6		Pts: Roundy 25; Rebs: Roundy 18; Asts: Palalas 4

Cork
Attendance: 1,200
Referees: Werner Huybreghs (BEL), John Hammervoll (NOR)

22 Jan 2003
20:15

Boxscore

Croatia	69–61	Bosnia and Herzegovina
Scoring by quarter: 24–15, 21–10, 17–16, 7–20
Pts: Bazdaric 18; Rebs: Prkácin, Planinic 5 Asts: Planinic 4		Pts: Ovcina 13; Rebs: Ovcina 8 Asts: Markovic Zoric 3

Šibenik
Attendance: 2,000
Referees: Sasa Pukl (SLO), Luciano Tola (ITA)

25 Jan 2003
15:00

Boxscore

Germany	81–73	Croatia
Scoring by quarter: 24–22, 21–17, 15–27, 21–7
Pts: Okulaja 17; Rebs: Femerling 9 Asts: Demirel, Okulaja 3		Pts: Bazdaric 18; Rebs: Skelin 11; Asts: Tomas 5

Wilhelm Dopatka Halle, Leverkusen
Attendance: 3,500
Referees: Manuel Alzuria (ESP), Fatih Söylemezoglu (TUR)

25 Jan 2003
18:30

Boxscore

Macedonia	83–65	Cyprus
Scoring by quarter: 26–20, 23–15, 24–22, 10–8
Pts: Dimitrovski, Jones 17; Rebs: Jones 7 Asts: Samardziev 4		Pts: Roundy 17; Rebs: Roundy 14; Asts: Palalas 4

Strumica
Attendance: 1,500
Referees: Tihomir Bubalo (SRB), Marin Mehandjiev(BUL)

25 Jan 2003
20:15

Boxscore

Bosnia and Herzegovina	94–77	Ireland
Scoring by quarter: 31–14, 26–17, 20–21, 17–25
Pts: Mujezinovic 21; Rebs: Ovcina 8 Asts: Mrsic 5		Pts: Bowdler 26; Rebs: Bowdler 7 Asts: J. J. Larranaga 4

Skenderija, Sarajevo
Attendance: 4,000
Referees: Christos Mastraftsis (GRE), Haluk Yesiloglu (TUR)

=== Group D ===
Team	Pld	W	L	PF	PA	PD	Pts	Tie
France	10	8	2	843	734	+109	18	
Latvia	10	6	4	878	858	+20	16	
Hungary	10	5	5	829	804	+25	15	1–1 +10
Estonia	10	5	5	815	810	+5	15	1–1 -10
Belarus	10	3	7	673	798	−125	13	2–0
Poland	10	3	7	805	843	−38	13	0–2

Rules=1) Points; 2) Head-to-head results; 3) Points difference; 4) Points scored.

21 Nov 2001
19:15

Boxscore

Latvia	81–92	Poland
Scoring by quarter: 17–20, 21–19, 14–20, 29–33
Pts: Stelmahers, Bagatskis 21; Rebs: Kambala 12; Asts: Miglinieks 10		Pts: Pluta 25; Rebs: Tomczyk 10; Asts: Zielinski 9

Ventspils
Attendance: 2,800
Referees: Ivan Zachara (CZE), Apostolos Kalpakas (SWE)

21 Nov 2001
19:30

Boxscore

Estonia	84–56	Belarus
Scoring by quarter: 20–19, 18–9, 28–12, 18–16
Pts: Müürsepp 19; Rebs: Metstak 10; Asts: Kullamäe 7		Pts: Kuchinski 12; Rebs: Kuchinski 8 Asts: Kuchinski, Charko, Kuzmin, Meshcharakou 4

Saku Suurhall, Tallinn
Attendance: 6,200
Referees: Vladimir Okhrimenko (RUS), Sergiy Chebyshev (UKR)

21 Nov 2001
20:30

Boxscore

France	81–73	Hungary
Scoring by quarter: 17–17, 21–15, 25–20, 18–21
Pts: Risacher, Evtimov 12; Rebs: Evtimov 8 Asts: Sonko, Digbeu 4		Pts: Kálmán 21; Rebs: Báder 8 Asts: Kálmán 7

Le Colisée, Chalon-sur-Saône
Attendance: 4,000
Referees: Michel Zegwaard (NED), Gennaro Colucci (ITA)

24 Nov 2001
18:00

Boxscore

Hungary	87–96	Latvia
Scoring by quarter: 17–20, 19–23, 26–26, 25–27
Pts: Kálmán 22; Rebs: Gémes 6 Asts: Kálmán 6		Pts: Kambala 33; Rebs: Kambala 7 Asts: Miglinieks 3

Tiszaújváros
Attendance: 1,200
Referees: Ivo Dolinek (CZE), Srdan Dozai (CRO)

24 Nov 2001
19:00

Boxscore

Belarus	61–85	France
Scoring by quarter: 21–17, 21–25, 25–13, 9–23
Pts: Kuchinski 17; Rebs: Aliakseyeu 8 Asts: Baidakou 4		Pts: Sonko 20; Rebs: Evtimov 12; Asts: Sciarra 5

Sports Palace, Minsk
Attendance: 4,000
Referees: Karel Bruna (CZE), Nikolaos Zavlanos (GRE)

24 Nov 2001
19:00

Boxscore

Poland	110–105 (OT)	Estonia
Scoring by quarter: 25–22, 24–30, 28–25, 20–20, Overtime: 13–8
Pts: Zielinski 29; Rebs: McNaull 13; Asts: Tomczyk 6		Pts: Müürsepp 26; Rebs: Müürsepp 12; Asts: Pärn 5

Hala Mistrzów, Wloclawek
Attendance: 3,100
Referees: Andreas Roth (AUT), Dubravko Muhvic (CRO)

28 Nov 2001
19:00

Boxscore

Latvia	115–91	Belarus
Scoring by quarter: 25–31, 27–26, 29–16, 34–18
Pts: Helmanis 28; Rebs: Kambala 9 Asts: Miglinieks 15		Pts: Korshuk 25; Rebs: Kuzmin 7 Asts: Kuzmin 5

Riga
Attendance: 2,710
Referees: Andrei Bostan (MDA), Tomas Jasevicius (LTU)

28 Nov 2001
19:30

Boxscore

Estonia	63–59	France
Scoring by quarter: 14–13, 16–14, 15–14, 18–18
Pts: Müürsepp 24; Rebs: Pehka 9 Asts: Pehka 7		Pts: Sonko 13; Rebs: Evtimov 13; Asts: Sciarra 4

Saku Suurhall, Tallinn
Attendance: 6,950
Referees: Carl Jungebrand (FIBA), Björn Braathen (NOR)

28 Nov 2001
20:00

Boxscore

Hungary	101–86	Poland
Scoring by quarter: 31–24, 18–22, 25–11, 27–29
Pts: Németh 27; Rebs: Gémes, Báder 6 Asts: Kálmán 12		Pts: Pluta 16; Rebs: Tomczyk, McNaull 5 Asts: Zielinski 2

Lauber Dezső, Pécs
Attendance: 3,000
Referees: Virginijus Dovidavicius (LTU), Sasa Pukl (SLO)

23 Jan 2002
19:00

Boxscore

Poland	70–78 (OT)	France
Scoring by quarter: 13–19, 18–20, 21–10, 13–16, Overtime: 5–13
Pts: Wojcik 22; Rebs: McNaull 15; Asts: Sidor, Zielinski 4		Pts: Foirest 20; Rebs: Julian 9 Asts: Sciarra 5

Hala Mistrzów, Wloclawek
Attendance: 4,000
Referees: Efim Resser (GER), Ivan Zachara (CZE)

23 Jan 2002
19:00

Boxscore

Belarus	64–69	Hungary
Scoring by quarter: 16–19, 22–15, 12–17, 14–18
Pts: Aliakseyeu 19; Rebs: Aliakseyeu 11; Asts: Kuzmin 4		Pts: Németh 21; Rebs: Czigler 11; Asts: Mészáros 6

Sports Palace, Minsk
Attendance: 4,000
Referees: Andreas Roth (AUT), Stelian Banica (ROU)

23 Jan 2002
19:30

Boxscore

Estonia	79–86	Latvia
Scoring by quarter: 21–20, 16–26, 26–20, 16–20
Pts: Müürsepp 18; Rebs: Müürsepp 8 Asts: Kriisa 6		Pts: Kambala 23; Rebs: Bagatskis 13; Asts: Miglinieks 7

Saku Suurhall, Tallinn
Attendance: 8,000
Referees: Virginijus Dovidavicius (LTU), Oscar Lefwerth (SWE)

26 Jan 2002
17:00

Boxscore

Belarus	78–67	Poland
Scoring by quarter: 14–17, 23–14, 25–25, 16–11
Pts: Baidakou 17; Rebs: Veremeenko 9 Asts: Baidakou 4		Pts: Zielinski 16; Rebs: Wojcik 8 Asts: Szczesniak, Zielinski, Korytek 3

Sports Palace, Minsk
Attendance: 4,000
Referees: Jaroslav Janac (SVK), Leonidas Spiridonos (GRE)

26 Jan 2002
18:00

Boxscore

Hungary	94–71	Estonia
Scoring by quarter: 29–17, 20–20, 23–16, 22–18
Pts: Németh 24; Rebs: Sitku 11; Asts: Németh 6		Pts: Tein, Müürsepp 18; Rebs: Müürsepp 8 Asts: Kullamäe 5

Kaposvár
Attendance: 1,300
Referees: Tihomir Bubalo (SRB), Andrej Jelen (SLO)

26 Jan 2002
19:00

Boxscore

Latvia	81–87	France
Scoring by quarter: 22–18, 17–23, 23–26, 19–20
Pts: Kambala 21; Rebs: Kambala 7 Asts: Miglinieks 6		Pts: Foirest, Julian 18; Rebs: Julian, Evtimov 6 Asts: Sonko, Sciarra 5

Riga
Attendance: 3,700
Referees: Karel Bruna (CZE), Oscar Lefwerth (SWE)

20 Nov 2002
18:00

Boxscore

Hungary	94–80	France
Scoring by quarter: 21–21, 24–15, 27–21, 22–23
Pts: Dzunic, Németh 21; Rebs: Kálmán 7 Asts: Mészáros, Czigler 4		Pts: Foirest 33; Rebs: F. Pietrus 5 Asts: Sciarra, Foirest 4

Szombathely
Attendance: 1,200
Referees: Srdan Dozai (CRO), Ilija Belosevic (SRB)

20 Nov 2002
20:00

Boxscore

Poland	76–86	Latvia
Scoring by quarter: 26–26, 13–18, 16–24, 21–18
Pts: Pluta 15; Rebs: Tomczyk 9 Asts: Szczesniak 6		Pts: Kambala 29; Rebs: Kambala 14; Asts: Sneps 9

Rzeszów
Attendance: 4,000
Referees: Petr Sudek (SVK), Milivoje Jovcic (SRB)

20 Nov 2002
20:00

Boxscore

Belarus	81–79	Estonia
Scoring by quarter: 26–15, 13–20, 19–21, 23–23
Pts: Veremeenko 18; Rebs: Meshcharakou 8 Asts: Veremeenko 4		Pts: Müürsepp 25; Rebs: Müürsepp 8 Asts: Kuusmaa 4

Gomel
Attendance: 1,200
Referees: Volodymyr Drabikovskyi (UKR), Andrei Bostan (MDA)

23 Nov 2002
19:15

Boxscore

Latvia	97–88	Hungary
Scoring by quarter: 28–20, 20–19, 27–27, 22–22
Pts: Bagatskis 23; Rebs: Kambala 13; Asts: Buskevics 6		Pts: Németh 22; Rebs: Czigler 4 Asts: Kálmán 8

Ventspils
Attendance: 3,050
Referees: Ladislav Janac (SVK), Ivo Dolinek (CZE)

23 Nov 2002
19:30

Boxscore

Estonia	78–63	Poland
Scoring by quarter: 21–13, 21–13, 16–12, 20–25
Pts: Müürsepp 15; Rebs: Müürsepp 8 Asts: Tein 6		Pts: Korytek 17; Rebs: Korytek 11; Asts: Zielinski 4

Saku Suurhall, Tallinn
Attendance: 6,500
Referees: Carl Jungebrand (FIBA), Ivan Zachara (CZE)

23 Nov 2002
20:00

Boxscore

France	83–56	Belarus
Scoring by quarter: 20–17, 24–12, 18–11, 21–16
Pts: Foirest 20; Rebs: F. Pietrus, Masingue 8 Asts: Sciarra 6		Pts: Veremeenko 15; Rebs: Veremeenko 11; Asts: Meshcharakou 4

Nantes
Attendance: 5,102
Referees: Antonio Coelho (POR), Keith Williams (ENG)

27 Nov 2002
20:00

Boxscore

Poland	88–65	Hungary
Scoring by quarter: 19–21, 21–10, 25–22, 23–12
Pts: Pluta 32; Rebs: Pluta 8 Asts: Pluta 6		Pts: Dávid 15; Rebs: Dávid 7 Asts: Kálmán, Gulyas, Mészáros 2

Rzeszów
Attendance: 4,000
Referees: Virginijus Dovidavicius (LTU), Ilija Belosevic (SRB)

27 Nov 2002
20:00

Boxscore

France	93–73	Estonia
Scoring by quarter: 24–24, 26–24, 16–10, 27–15
Pts: F. Pietrus 27; Rebs: Diaw 9 Asts: Sciarra 5		Pts: Müürsepp 21; Rebs: Müürsepp 6 Asts: Tein 5

Antarès, Le Mans
Attendance: 5,200
Referees: Armand De Keyser (BEL), Petr Sudek (SVK)

27 Nov 2002
20:00

Boxscore

Belarus	63–65	Latvia
Scoring by quarter: 15–19, 15–11, 15–16, 18–19
Pts: Meshcharakou 21; Rebs: Meshcharakou 10; Asts: Kuzmin 4		Pts: Bagatskis 23; Rebs: Sneps, Bagatskis 10; Asts: Buskevics 5

Gomel
Attendance: 1,200
Referees: Aleksander Gorshkov (RUS), Tomas Teluch (CZE)

22 Jan 2003
18:00

Boxscore

Hungary	83–53	Belarus
Scoring by quarter: 19–11, 24–18, 20–8, 20–16
Pts: Németh 17; Rebs: Dávid 9 Asts: Kálmán 4		Pts: Charko 12; Rebs: Aliakseyeu 9 Asts: Krivonos 2

Főnix Hall, Debrecen
Attendance: 6,000
Referees: Dubravko Muhvic (CRO), Roman Kolar (SLO)

22 Jan 2003
19:00

Boxscore

Latvia	93–95 (OT)	Estonia
Scoring by quarter: 30–20, 14–19, 22–30, 18–15, Overtime: 9–11
Pts: Stelmahers, Sneps, Kambala 16; Rebs: Kambala 16; Asts: Stelmahers 7		Pts: Tein 29; Rebs: Müürsepp 10; Asts: Kriisa 8

Olympic Center, Ventspils
Attendance: 3,500
Referees: Volodymyr Drabikovskyi (UKR), Aleksander Gorshkov (RUS)

22 Jan 2003
20:00

Boxscore

France	101–85	Poland
Scoring by quarter: 23–13, 26–30, 25–20, 27–22
Pts: Julian 25; Rebs: Julian 7 Asts: Sciarra, Foirest 6		Pts: Pluta 22; Rebs: Korytek 5 Asts: Pluta 6

Douai
Attendance: 6,800
Referees: Ladislav Janac (SVK), Vicente Bulto (ESP)

25 Jan 2003
17:00

Boxscore

Poland	68–70	Belarus
Scoring by quarter: 21–16, 16–17, 12–18, 19–19
Pts: Tomczyk 20; Rebs: Tomczyk, Korytek 8 Asts: Szczesniak 5		Pts: Meshcharakou 20; Rebs: Kuchinski 7 Asts: Kuzmin 4

Łuczniczka, Bydgoszcz
Attendance: 6,500
Referees: Hermann Latz (GER), Robert Paulik (CZE)

25 Jan 2003
19:30

Boxscore

Estonia	88–75	Hungary
Scoring by quarter: 17–14, 22–17, 18–24, 31–20
Pts: Müürsepp 21; Rebs: Pehka 9 Asts: Tein 9		Pts: Dávid 19; Rebs: Dávid 9 Asts: Kálmán 6

Saku Suurhall, Tallinn
Attendance: 6,500
Referees: Neil Wilkinson (ENG), Oscar Lefwerth (SWE)

25 Jan 2003
20:00

Boxscore

France	96–78	Latvia
Scoring by quarter: 31–24, 17–20, 29–14, 19–20
Pts: Sciarra 23; Rebs: Julian 9 Asts: Sciarra 11		Pts: Bagatskis 20; Rebs: Kambala 11; Asts: Stelmahers, Sneps 5

Grenoble
Attendance: 7,400
Referees: Leonidas Spiridonos (GRE), Daniel Hierrezuelo (ESP)

=== Group E ===
Team	Pld	W	L	PF	PA	PD	Pts
Italy	10	8	2	874	699	+175	18
Slovenia	10	7	3	826	771	+55	17
Russia	10	6	4	852	742	+110	16
Czech Republic	10	4	6	821	879	−58	14
England	10	3	7	662	850	−188	13
Portugal	10	2	8	804	922	−118	12

21 Nov 2001
18:00

Boxscore

Slovenia	77–65	Portugal
Scoring by quarter: 10–18, 23–12, 20–18, 24–17
Pts: Jurković 20; Rebs: Becirovic 9 Asts: Becirovic 6		Pts: Tavares 17; Rebs: Gómez Marques Pinto 10; Asts: Tavares, Gómez Marques Pinto 3

Kranj
Attendance: 2,000
Referees: Jaroslav Janac (SVK), Peter Bodnar (HUN)

21 Nov 2001
19:00

Boxscore

Russia	109–78	Czech Republic
Scoring by quarter: 33–21, 25–20, 26–22, 25–15
Pts: Petrenko 25; Rebs: Avleev, Savrasenko 7 Asts: E. Pashutin 9		Pts: Welsch 27; Rebs: Frana 9 Asts: Czudek 4

Moscow
Attendance: 3,000
Referees: Kestutis Pilipauskas (LTU), Marek Cmikiewicz (POL)

21 Nov 2001
20:30

Boxscore

Italy	99–63	England
Scoring by quarter: 24–18, 19–9, 35–16, 21–20
Pts: Basile 24; Rebs: Chiacig 9 Asts: Myers 3		Pts: Betts 17; Rebs: Haslam, Betts 7 Asts: Dorsey, 1

PalaMaggetti, Roseto degli Abruzzi
Attendance: 3,800
Referees: Eduardo Sancha (ESP), Tolga Sahin (ITA)

24 Nov 2001
17:00

Boxscore

Russia	90–77	Portugal
Scoring by quarter: 24–14, 25–23, 22–25, 19–15
Pts: Karasev 25; Rebs: Avleev 10; Asts: Karasev, Panov, Avleev 4		Pts: Gouveia Simão 18; Rebs: Gómez Marques Pinto 5 Asts: Gouveia Simão 5

Molot, Perm
Attendance: 7,500
Referees: Aliaksandr Yarotski (BLR), Dimitar Gologanov (BUL)

24 Nov 2001
19:30

Boxscore

England	73–70	Slovenia
Scoring by quarter: 18–14, 19–21, 14–22, 22–13
Pts: Dorsey 16; Rebs: Betts 13; Asts: Dorsey, Betts 3		Pts: Becirovic 24; Rebs: Kraljević 8 Asts: Milic 4

Coventry
Referees: Serge De Coster (BEL), Vicente Bulto (ESP)

25 Nov 2001
15:00

Boxscore

Czech Republic	75–81	Italy
Scoring by quarter: 19–16, 14–21, 22–14, 20–30
Pts: Welsch 25; Rebs: Starosta 9 Asts: Czudek 6		Pts: Myers 31; Rebs: Tonolli, Chiacig 7 Asts: Basile 5

Brno
Attendance: 1,000
Referees: Nikolaos Karoussis (GRE), Ilija Belosevic (SRB)

28 Nov 2001
17:00

Boxscore

Czech Republic	74–87	England
Scoring by quarter: 22–25, 20–23, 18–18, 14–21
Pts: Becka 20; Rebs: Becka 8 Asts: Czudek 3		Pts: Betts 31; Rebs: Betts 8 Asts: Dorsey 3

Opava
Attendance: 1,200
Referees: Efim Resser (GER), Peter Bodnar (HUN)

28 Nov 2001
19:00

Boxscore

Russia	88–63	Slovenia
Scoring by quarter: 21–20, 21–17, 23–13, 23–13
Pts: Avleev 20; Rebs: Mikhailov 12; Asts: Panov 6		Pts: Jurković, Nachbar 12; Rebs: Kraljević 7 Asts: Becirovic, Jurković 3

Molot, Perm
Attendance: 7,500
Referees: Nikolaos Pitsilkas (GRE), Petri Mäntylä (FIN)

28 Nov 2001
20:30

Boxscore

Italy	89–56	Portugal
Scoring by quarter: 27–17, 21–14, 18–10, 23–24
Pts: Chiacig 18; Rebs: Marconato 11; Asts: Basile 4		Pts: Evora 16; Rebs: Evora 10; Asts: Dias da Silva, Gómez Marques Pinto, Evora 1

PalaSavelli, Porto San Giorgio
Attendance: 4,300
Referees: Memduh Öget (TUR), Tonci Anzulovic (CRO)

23 Jan 2002
23:15

Boxscore

Portugal	65–88 (OT)	Czech Republic
Scoring by quarter: 16–18, 11–23, 17–20, 21–27, Overtime: 5–13
Pts: Gouveia Simão 14; Rebs: Evora 8 Asts: Tavares 3		Pts: Welsch 25; Rebs: Welsch 7 Asts: Czudek, Welsch 3

Terceira Azores
Attendance: 2,000
Referees: Miguel Betancor (ESP), Goran Radonjic (FRA)

23 Jan 2002
19:00

Boxscore

England	51–80	Russia
Scoring by quarter: 16–22, 24–17, 6–23, 5–18
Pts: Dorsey, Betts 12; Rebs: Dorsey 8 Asts: Betts 5		Pts: Panov 18; Rebs: Savrasenko 6 Asts: E. Pashutin, Avleev 4

Coventry
Attendance: 1,300
Referees: Mateo Ramos (ESP), Jan Gjettermann (DEN)

23 Jan 2002
20:00

Boxscore

Slovenia	84–78	Italy
Scoring by quarter: 20–15, 22–18, 16–19, 26–26
Pts: Jurković, Smodis 17; Rebs: Tusek, Smodis 6 Asts: McDonald 8		Pts: Pittis, Pozzecco 19; Rebs: Galanda, Pittis 5 Asts: Meneghin 5

Arena Bonifika, Koper
Attendance: 3,500
Referees: Pascal Dorizon (FRA), Tolga Sahin (ITA)

26 Jan 2002
15:00

Boxscore

Portugal	74–70	England
Scoring by quarter: 19–20, 18–15, 17–19, 20–16
Pts: Dos Santos Monteiro 19; Rebs: Evora 10; Asts: Tavares 6		Pts: Betts 18; Rebs: Betts 11; Asts: Hansell 2

Terceira Azores
Attendance: 2,500
Referees: Serge De Coster (BEL), Anibal Castano (FRA)

26 Jan 2002
17:00

Boxscore

Italy	86–66	Russia
Scoring by quarter: 22–15, 25–19, 17–16, 22–16
Pts: Meneghin 15; Rebs: Pittis 7 Asts: Basile, Pittis, Myers, Meneghin 3		Pts: Avleev 18; Rebs: Mikhailov, Savrasenko 9 Asts: Panov, E. Pashutin 2

BPA Palas, Pesaro
Attendance: 6,000
Referees: Manuel Alzuria (ESP), Lazaros Voreadis (GRE)

26 Jan 2002
17:00

Boxscore

Czech Republic	71–70 (OT)	Slovenia
Scoring by quarter: 16–10, 6–15, 14–16, 23–18, Overtime: 12–11
Pts: Welsch 22; Rebs: Frana 12; Asts: Czudek, Welsch 6		Pts: Tusek 21; Rebs: Smodis 8 Asts: McDonald 3

Prague
Attendance: 3,600
Referees: Christos Mastraftsis (GRE), Grzegorz Bachanski (POL)

20 Nov 2002
16:30

Boxscore

Czech Republic	89–103	Russia
Scoring by quarter: 23–15, 17–25, 15–34, 34–29
Pts: Milos 22; Rebs: Zídek 10; Asts: Pavlík 6		Pts: Karasev, Savrasenko 20; Rebs: Savrasenko 9 Asts: Karasev 8

Prague
Attendance: 2,500
Referees: Dubravko Muhvic (CRO), Marek Cmikiewicz (POL)

20 Nov 2002
19:00

Boxscore

England	39–97	Italy
Scoring by quarter: 15–21, 8–30, 8–26, 8–20
Pts: Betts 16; Rebs: Betts 12; Asts: Baker, Dorsey, Gardiner, Pearson, Bernard, Betts 1		Pts: Chiacig 17; Rebs: Marconato 9 Asts: Pozzecco 8

Coventry
Referees: Serge De Coster (BEL), Manuel Alzuria (ESP)

20 Nov 2002
19:00

Boxscore

Portugal	99–106	Slovenia
Scoring by quarter: 21–29, 25–28, 28–24, 25–25
Pts: A. Selores Ramos 36; Rebs: Evora 10; Asts: Tavares Manarte 7		Pts: Tusek 23; Rebs: Milic 6 Asts: Milic 9

São João da Madeira
Attendance: 2,000
Referees: Chantal Julien (FRA), Juan Arteaga (ESP)

23 Nov 2002
15:30

Boxscore

Portugal	91–83	Russia
Scoring by quarter: 12–15, 19–19, 33–24, 27–25
Pts: A. Selores Ramos 26; Rebs: Van Veldhuizen 10; Asts: Costa 6		Pts: Pashutin 17; Rebs: Panov 9 Asts: Karasev 3

Santo Tirso
Attendance: 2,500
Referees: Gilles Bretagne (FRA), Juan Redondo (ESP)

23 Nov 2002
16:00

Boxscore

Slovenia	104–71	England
Scoring by quarter: 26–20, 34–10, 18–18, 26–23
Pts: Lakovic 20; Rebs: Jurković 9 Asts: Milic 4		Pts: Dorsey 16; Rebs: Haslam, Betts 6 Asts: Hansell 4

Litija
Attendance: 2,000
Referees: Memduh Öget (TUR), Christos Mastraftsis (GRE)

23 Nov 2002
17:00

Boxscore

Italy	88–68	Czech Republic
Scoring by quarter: 20–13, 23–14, 27–20, 18–21
Pts: Radulovic, Pozzecco 19; Rebs: Radulovic 9 Asts: Pozzecco 4		Pts: Milos 17; Rebs: Necas 7 Asts: Czudek, Necas, Bartoň 2

PalaTrento, Trento
Attendance: 4,500
Referees: Srdan Dozai (CRO), Vicente Bulto (ESP)

27 Nov 2002
18:00

Boxscore

Slovenia	82–76	Russia
Scoring by quarter: 19–20, 26–20, 20–18, 17–18
Pts: Tusek 19; Rebs: Tusek 9 Asts: Milic 3		Pts: Chikalkin 21; Rebs: Khryapa 5 Asts: Pashutin, Morgunov 1

Maribor
Attendance: 4,500
Referees: Manuel Alzuria (ESP), Grzegorz Ziemblicki (POL)

27 Nov 2002
19:00

Boxscore

England	68–74	Czech Republic
Scoring by quarter: 21–18, 16–19, 17–12, 14–25
Pts: Dorsey 25; Rebs: Betts 12; Asts: Dorsey, Haslam 3		Pts: Zídek 23; Rebs: Starosta 9 Asts: Zídek 4

Birmingham
Attendance: 1,824
Referees: Romualdas Brazauskas (LTU), Arjan Greva (FRA)

27 Nov 2002
21:00

Boxscore

Portugal	68–103	Italy
Scoring by quarter: 17–27, 14–29, 19–22, 18–25
Pts: Costa 17; Rebs: Coragem Jordão 8 Asts: Costa, Coragem Jordão, Rodrigues Rocha 2		Pts: Bulleri 23; Rebs: Marconato 7 Asts: Marconato 4

Funchal
Attendance: 1,000
Referees: Mateo Ramos (ESP), Serge De Coster (BEL)

22 Jan 2003
16:30

Boxscore

Czech Republic	124–116 (OT)	Portugal
Scoring by quarter: 26–27, 28–25, 24–20, 26–32, Overtime: 20–12
Pts: Stanek 30; Rebs: Stanek, Sucharda 8 Asts: Czudek 10		Pts: A. Selores Ramos 37; Rebs: A. Selores Ramos 10; Asts: Tavares Manarte 7

Chomutov
Attendance: 1,500
Referees: Dariusz Szczerba (POL), Peter Bodnar (HUN)

22 Jan 2003
19:00

Boxscore

Russia	94–42	England
Scoring by quarter: 33–12, 22–7, 24–11, 15–12
Pts: Petrenko 16; Rebs: Avleev 10; Asts: Pashutin 11		Pts: Williams 24; Rebs: Pearson 10; Asts: Pearson 4

Moscow
Attendance: 3,000
Referees: Juris Kokainis (LAT), Grzegorz Bachanski (POL)

22 Jan 2003
20:30

Boxscore

Italy	70–78	Slovenia
Scoring by quarter: 15–20, 16–8, 17–27, 22–23
Pts: Bulleri 20; Rebs: Basile, Galanda, Marconato, Righetti, Chiacig 4 Asts: Basile, Galanda, Myers 2		Pts: Milic 25; Rebs: Milic 10; Asts: Lakovic 5

Pordenone
Attendance: 4,000
Referees: Romualdas Brazauskas (LTU), Tolga Sahin (ITA)

25 Jan 2003
17:00

Boxscore

Russia	63–83	Italy
Scoring by quarter: 21–28, 17–15, 15–24, 10–16
Pts: Savrasenko 18; Rebs: Savrasenko 10; Asts: Khryapa 4		Pts: Righetti 20; Rebs: Radulovic 7 Asts: Basile 6

Moscow
Attendance: 3,800
Referees: Nikolaos Karoussis (GRE), Zoran Sutulovic (MNE)

25 Jan 2003
17:00

Boxscore

Slovenia	90–82	Czech Republic
Scoring by quarter: 25–20, 27–21, 16–18, 24–21
Pts: Duscak 17; Rebs: Jurak 7 Asts: Jurak, Gorenc, Smodis 2		Pts: Sokolovsky 20; Rebs: Starosta 8 Asts: Czudek 3

Arena Bonifika, Koper
Attendance: 4,000
Referees: Virginijus Dovidavicius (LTU), Christos Christodoulou (GRE)

25 Jan 2003
19:00

Boxscore

England	92–84	Portugal
Scoring by quarter: 19–12, 33–23, 19–27, 21–22
Pts: Dorsey 23; Rebs: Betts 9 Asts: Dorsey, Hansell 6		Pts: A. Selores Ramos 19; Rebs: Coragem Jordão 12; Asts: Coragem Jordão, A. Selores Ramos 3

Birmingham
Attendance: 1,000
Referees: Jan Herweijer (NED), Manuel Martinez (ESP)
