= Zaza Pachulia =

Georgian basketball player (born 1984)

Zaza Pachulia ზაზა ფაჩულია
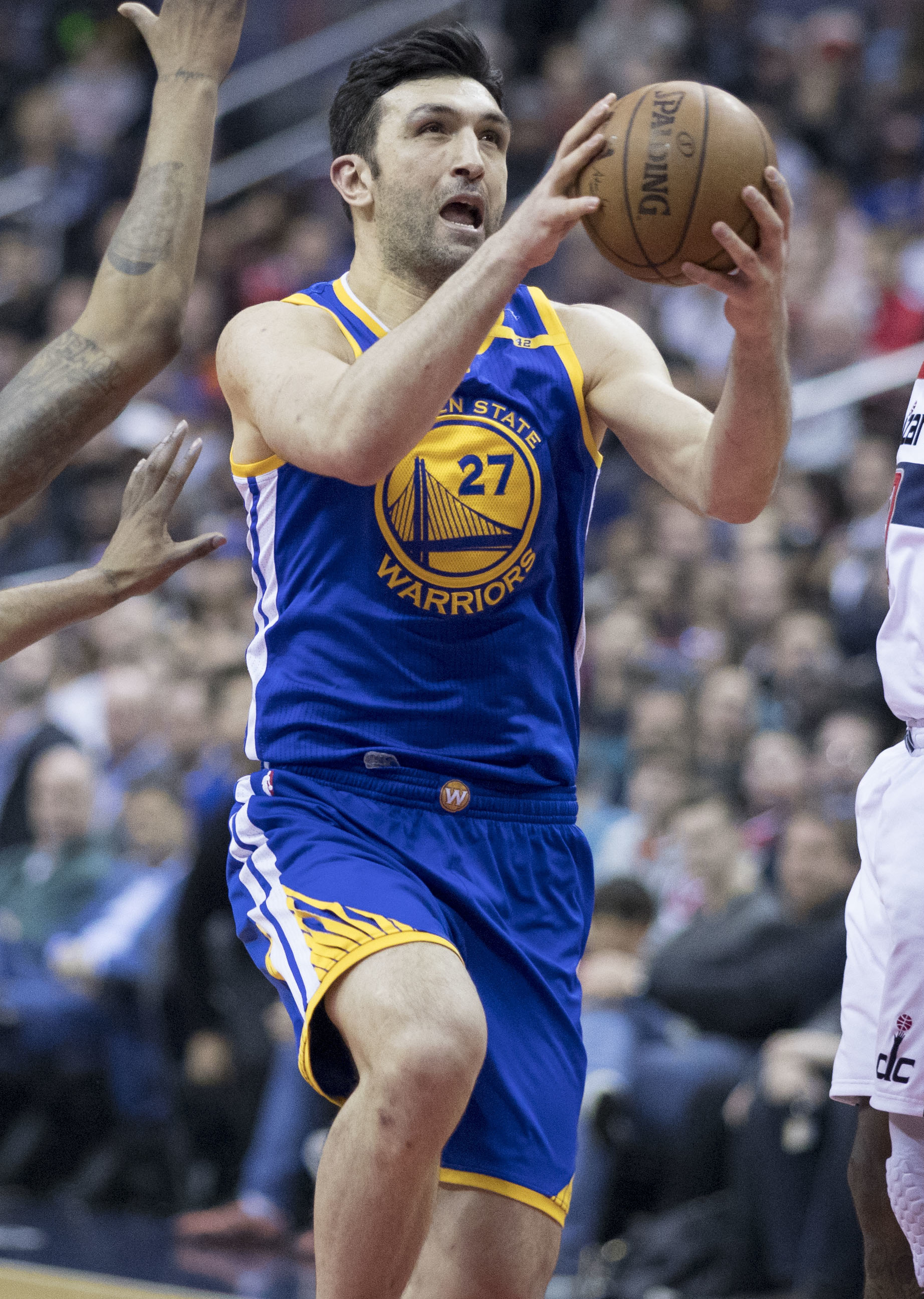
- Pachulia with the Golden State Warriors in 2017

Golden State Warriors
- Title: Consultant
- League: NBA

Personal information
- Born: 10 February 1984 (age 42) Tbilisi, Georgian SSR, Soviet Union
- Listed height: 6 ft 11 in (2.11 m)
- Listed weight: 270 lb (122 kg)

Career information
- NBA draft: 2003: 2nd round, 42nd overall pick
- Drafted by: Orlando Magic
- Playing career: 1999–2019
- Position: Center
- Number: 27

Career history
- 1999–2003: Ülkerspor
- 2003–2004: Orlando Magic
- 2004–2005: Milwaukee Bucks
- 2005–2013: Atlanta Hawks
- 2011: Galatasaray
- 2013–2015: Milwaukee Bucks
- 2015–2016: Dallas Mavericks
- 2016–2018: Golden State Warriors
- 2018–2019: Detroit Pistons

Career highlights
- As player: 2× NBA champion (2017, 2018); Turkish League champion (2001); Turkish Cup winner (2003); 3× Turkish Presidential Cup winner (2001–2003); As executive: NBA champion (2022)

Career NBA statistics
- Points: 7,414 (6.8 ppg)
- Rebounds: 6,315 (5.8 rpg)
- Assists: 1,433 (1.3 apg)
- Stats at NBA.com
- Stats at Basketball Reference

Zaur "Zaza" Pachulia (Georgian: ზაზა ფაჩულია; Georgian pronunciation: [zaza patʃʰulia], born 10 February 1984) is a Georgian professional basketball executive and former player who is a basketball operations consultant for the Golden State Warriors of the National Basketball Association (NBA).

Beginning his professional career in Turkey as a teenager, Pachulia was drafted in the second round of the 2003 NBA draft by the Orlando Magic. He played for seven teams in his 16-year NBA career, winning two championships with the Warriors in 2017 and 2018. He also played for the Georgia national team, captaining them in multiple tournaments. Pachulia also had a reputation of being a "dirty" player, notably injuring Kawhi Leonard during the 2017 playoffs that led to a rule change named after him, called the "Zaza rule".

== Professional career ==
=== Ülkerspor (1999–2003) ===
Pachulia started playing basketball at an early age in Georgia. He was approximately 6 feet 8 inches (2.03 meters) at the age of 13. He was scouted and recruited by the Turkish professional team Ülkerspor when he was a teenager. He became a member of the Georgian junior national basketball team at a young age, leading them at various tournaments.

=== Orlando Magic (2003–2004) ===
Once he distinguished himself with Ülkerspor, Pachulia was drafted in the second round by the Orlando Magic during the 2003 NBA draft.

=== Milwaukee Bucks (2004–2005) ===
After being selected in the 2004 expansion draft by the Charlotte Bobcats, Pachulia was traded to the Milwaukee Bucks, where he played the 2004–05 season. While with the Bucks, he averaged 6.2 points and 5.1 rebounds per game off the bench.

=== Atlanta Hawks (2005–2011) ===
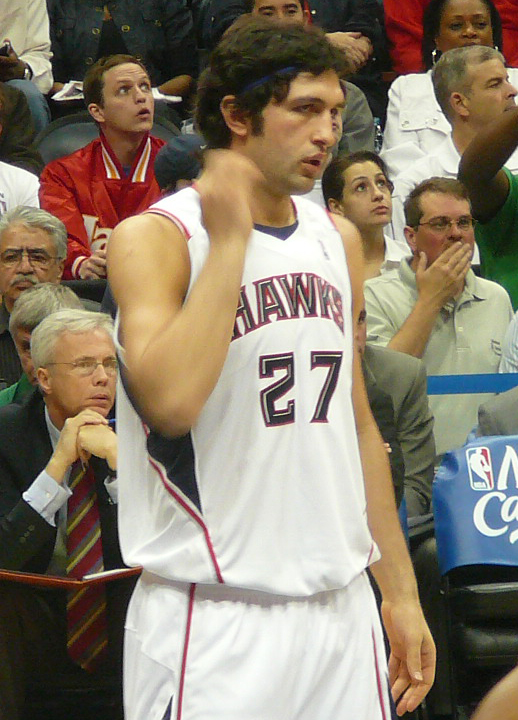
Pachulia with the Atlanta Hawks in May 2008

Pachulia signed a four-year, $16 million contract with the Atlanta Hawks in the 2005 off-season and became the Hawks' starting center, when he averaged 11.7 points and 7.9 rebounds per game during the 2005–06 season. He began as the starting center during the 2006–07 season but later came off the bench. An on-court altercation between the relatively obscure Pachulia and Celtics star Kevin Garnett led one writer to dub Pachulia "Balboa" after the lead character from the Rocky series of movies. Pachulia re-signed with the Hawks on July 13, 2009, agreeing to a four-year, $19 million contract.

=== Galatasaray (2011) ===
During the 2011 NBA lockout, Pachulia signed with Galatasaray of the Turkish Basketball League.

=== Return to Atlanta (2011–2013) ===
Pachulia returned to the Hawks in December 2011, playing with them until 2013.

=== Return to Milwaukee (2013–2015) ===
On July 17, 2013, Pachulia signed a three-year, $15.6 million contract with the Milwaukee Bucks. On March 20, 2015, he recorded 22 points and 21 rebounds in a 129–127 overtime loss to the Brooklyn Nets. His 21 rebounds included 18 offensive rebounds, which marked an NBA season high and a Bucks franchise record.

=== Dallas Mavericks (2015–2016) ===
On July 9, 2015, Pachulia was traded to the Dallas Mavericks in exchange for a future second-round pick. He made his debut for the Mavericks in the team's season opener against the Phoenix Suns on October 28, recording a double-double with 10 points and 10 rebounds in a 111–95 win. On December 26, he recorded his 16th double-double of the season with 17 points and 12 rebounds against the Chicago Bulls, surpassing his 2014–15 season total. On January 12, 2016, he recorded his 20th double-double of the season, and the 100th in his career, with 14 points and 12 rebounds in a 110–107 overtime loss to the Cleveland Cavaliers. Later that month, he came within 14,227 votes of knocking out San Antonio Spurs small forward Kawhi Leonard for a starting spot on the West All-Star team for the 2016 NBA All-Star Game. On February 3, 2016, he recorded 10 points and 15 rebounds against the Miami Heat for his career-best 22nd double-double of the season. His previous best was 21 double-doubles, set with Atlanta in 2005–06.

=== Golden State Warriors (2016–2018) ===
==== 2016–17 season ====
On July 12, 2016, Pachulia signed with the Golden State Warriors. On December 22, 2016, he had a season-best game with 15 points and 14 rebounds in a 117–101 win over the Brooklyn Nets. Pachulia helped the Warriors finish the 2016–17 regular season with 67 wins. During Game 1 of the Western Conference Finals against the Spurs, he had an infamous closeout foot slide on Kawhi Leonard, which ruled out Leonard for the rest of the series and effectively ended San Antonio's season. While Pachulia denied that he intended to injure Leonard, he was instantly dubbed a villain by the public and media. The Warriors went on to win the NBA championship after defeating the Cavaliers 4–1 in the 2017 NBA Finals. Pachulia made history for Georgia by becoming the first player from the country to win an NBA Championship. The Warriors finished the playoffs with a 16–1 record, the best postseason winning percentage in NBA history.

==== 2017–18 season ====
On July 25, 2017, Pachulia re-signed with the Warriors. On December 30, 2017, he scored a season-best 17 points to go with eight rebounds and six assists in a 141–128 win over the Memphis Grizzlies.

In a game against the Thunder on February 25, 2018, Pachulia again caused controversy as he fell onto Russell Westbrook's knee after a play. Westbrook stated in an interview after the game that he believed Pachulia's fall was intentional with the intent of injuring his knee. Teammate Kevin Durant later defended Pachulia stating that he had gotten his feet tangled up with Nick Young in the incident, but Pachulia was criticized by many players, coaches and pundits such as Paul George, Kyrie Irving, Gregg Popovich, describing the incident as yet another in a long list of controversial dirty plays in Pachulia's career. The NBA officially stated that they would not discipline Pachulia over the incident. In June 2018, Pachulia won his second straight championship as a member of the Warriors, after they defeated the Cavaliers in a four-game sweep in the Finals.

=== Detroit Pistons (2018–2019) ===
On July 15, 2018, Pachulia signed with the Detroit Pistons.

== Executive career ==
On August 29, 2019, Pachulia retired from playing and re-joined the Warriors as a front office consultant in their basketball operations department. He won his third NBA championship after the Warriors defeated the Boston Celtics in six games in the 2022 NBA Finals.

== Personal life ==
Pachulia legally changed his first name from Zaur to Zaza. He and his wife, Tika, have two sons, Davit and Saba, and a daughter, Mariam. Beginning in 2004, Pachulia hosted annual free summer basketball camps for children in different locations throughout Georgia until 2016 when he established a basketball academy in his native Tbilisi.

In 2017, Pachulia received the Order of Honor of Georgia from President Giorgi Margvelashvili. He also holds Turkish citizenship.

== Career statistics ==
Legend
GP	Games played	GS	Games started	MPG	Minutes per game
FG%	Field goal percentage	3P%	3-point field goal percentage	FT%	Free throw percentage
RPG	Rebounds per game	APG	Assists per game	SPG	Steals per game
BPG	Blocks per game	PPG	Points per game	**Bold**	Career high
†	Won an NBA championship

=== NBA ===
==== Regular season ====
Year	Team	GP	GS	MPG	FG%	3P%	FT%	RPG	APG	SPG	BPG	PPG
2003–04	Orlando	59	2	11.3	.389	–	.644	2.9	.2	.4	.2	3.3
2004–05	Milwaukee	74	4	18.9	.452	.000	.746	5.1	.8	.6	**.5**	6.2
2005–06	Atlanta	78	**78**	**31.4**	.451	.000	.735	7.9	1.7	**1.1**	**.5**	11.7
2006–07	Atlanta	72	47	28.1	.474	.000	.786	6.9	1.5	**1.1**	**.5**	**12.2**
2007–08	Atlanta	62	5	15.2	.437	.000	.706	4.0	.6	.4	.2	5.2
2008–09	Atlanta	77	26	19.1	.497	.000	.709	5.7	.7	.5	.3	6.2
2009–10	Atlanta	78	1	14.0	.488	.000	.650	3.8	.5	.5	.4	4.3
2010–11	Atlanta	**79**	7	15.7	.461	–	.754	4.2	.7	.4	.3	4.4
2011–12	Atlanta	58	44	28.3	.499	–	.741	7.9	1.4	.9	**.5**	7.8
2012–13	Atlanta	52	15	21.8	.473	.000	.757	6.5	1.5	.7	.2	5.9
2013–14	Milwaukee	53	43	25.0	.427	.000	**.846**	6.3	**2.6**	.8	.3	7.7
2014–15	Milwaukee	73	45	23.7	.454	.000	.788	6.8	2.4	**1.1**	.3	8.3
2015–16	Dallas	76	69	26.4	.454	.000	.768	**9.4**	1.7	.8	.3	8.6
2016–17†	Golden State	70	70	18.1	.534	.000	.778	5.9	1.9	.8	**.5**	6.1
2017–18†	Golden State	69	57	14.1	**.564**	.000	.806	4.7	1.6	.6	.2	5.4
2018–19	Detroit	68	3	12.9	.440	.000	.782	3.9	1.3	.5	.3	3.9
Career		1,098	516	20.3	.469	.000	.751	5.8	1.3	.7	.3	6.8

==== Playoffs ====
Year	Team	GP	GS	MPG	FG%	3P%	FT%	RPG	APG	SPG	BPG	PPG
2008	Atlanta	7	0	15.0	.280	.000	.714	2.9	.3	.3	.0	4.1
2009	Atlanta	11	1	**23.6**	.415	–	.762	**6.9**	.3	.5	.3	**6.9**
2010	Atlanta	11	0	14.6	.514	–	.625	3.5	.3	.2	**.6**	4.6
2011	Atlanta	11	0	17.7	.478	–	.773	4.9	1.2	.2	.1	3.5
2015	Milwaukee	6	6	21.5	.400	–	.615	6.7	1.5	**1.7**	.5	6.7
2016	Dallas	5	4	22.4	.375	–	**.882**	5.4	**3.2**	.6	.2	6.6
2017†	Golden State	**15**	**15**	14.1	.533	.000	.765	3.8	.8	.5	.3	5.1
2018†	Golden State	7	0	3.7	**.571**	–	.750	1.7	.1	.4	.1	2.4
2019	Detroit	2	0	10.9	.333	–	.500	4.5	.0	.0	.0	2.5
Career		75	26	16.3	.443	.000	.735	4.4	.8	.5	.3	4.9

=== EuroLeague ===
Year	Team	GP	GS	MPG	FG%	3P%	FT%	RPG	APG	SPG	BPG	PPG	PIR
2001–02	Ülkerspor	13	1	7.4	**.536**	.000	**.733**	1.8	.2	.3	.1	3.2	3.7
2002–03	Ülkerspor	**14**	**2**	10.4	.467	.000	.625	2.9	.3	**.5**	**.5**	4.4	4.8
2011–12	Galatasaray	4	**2**	**15.1**	.389	.000	.600	**4.5**	**.5**	**.5**	**.5**	**6.5**	**6.8**
Career		31	5	10.0	.473	.000	.642	2.6	.3	.4	.1	4.2	4.6

=== National team ===
Year	Competition	GP	MPG	FG%	3P%	FT%	RPG	APG	SPG	BPG	PPG
2003	EuroBasket qualification Preliminary Round	5	23.4	.511	.000	.750	6.8	1.0	2.0	.0	12.6
2003	EuroBasket qualification Qualifying Round	5	27.6	.468	**.250**	.576	10.8	.0	**2.4**	.6	15.6
2005	EuroBasket 2005 Division B	6	31.3	**.595**	.000	.760	**13.0**	1.8	1.8	1.0	**21.0**
2007	EuroBasket 2007 Division B	8	**32.8**	.452	.000	.722	8.9	1.9	1.3	**1.9**	19.9
2009	EuroBasket 2009 Division B	**10**	29.4	.508	.000	.671	8.5	1.6	1.2	1.4	17.9
2011	EuroBasket 2011 qualification	8	28.6	.476	.000	.676	7.5	1.8	.9	.5	15.8
2011	EuroBasket 2011	5	25.8	.472	.000	.857	4.4	.6	1.0	.6	13.6
2013	EuroBasket 2013 qualification	5	29.6	.574	.000	.657	7.6	1.0	.8	.2	18.6
2015	EuroBasket 2015 qualification	6	32.5	.466	.000	.725	7.8	3.3	1.5	.7	17.5
2015	EuroBasket 2015	6	26.7	.474	.000	.844	6.3	3.0	1.0	.3	13.5
2017	EuroBasket 2017 qualification	6	26.2	.475	.000	**.921**	7.7	**4.3**	1.2	.5	15.2
2017	EuroBasket 2017	5	26.1	.447	.000	.758	9.2	1.6	.8	.2	13.4

== See also ==
- List of European basketball players in the United States
