= Zaza rule =

2017 NBA flagrant foul rule change

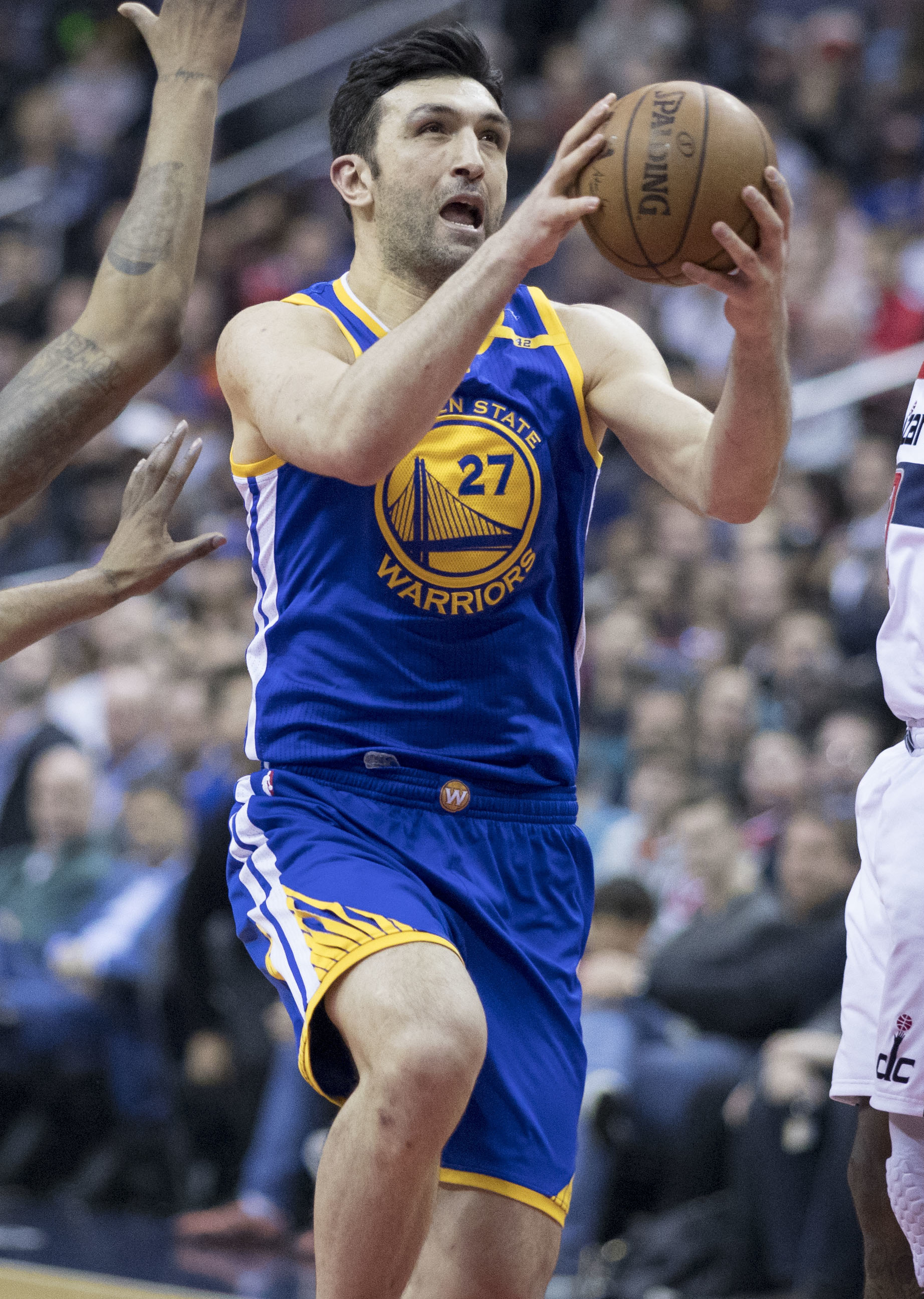
Zaza Pachulia

The Zaza rule is the unofficial title for a rule change in the 2017–18 NBA season concerning reckless closeouts (defensive advancements toward a shooter intended to disrupt a shot or prevent a pass). The namesake of the rule is Zaza Pachulia, then a center for the Golden State Warriors.

== Details and procedure ==
The Zaza Rule allows for referees to call flagrant or technical fouls on reckless defensive closeouts. After referees call a foul, they now possess the ability to determine if the defender's foot placement was reckless, allowing for an upgrade to flagrant, or to technical if there was no intent to injure determined.

== Reason for change ==
During the third quarter of Game 1 of the 2017 Western Conference Finals against the Golden State Warriors, when San Antonio Spurs star Kawhi Leonard went up for a two point jump shot, Pachulia closed in and placed his foot underneath Leonard as he was landing, causing Leonard to roll his ankle and re-aggravate an injury that Leonard suffered earlier in the playoffs. Leonard left the game and did not return for the rest of the series, and the Spurs eventually lost the Western Conference Finals in four games.

== Reaction to Pachulia's play ==
Due to Pachulia's history of physical play, many around the league condemned the play as dirty. Spurs coach Gregg Popovich was one of the most vocal, who said, "'[Pachulia] didn't have intent.' Who gives a damn about what his intent was? You ever heard of manslaughter? You still go to jail I think if you’re Texan and you kill somebody. And you might not have intended to do that. All I care is what I saw. All I care about is what happened. And the history there exacerbates the whole situation and makes me very, very angry."

NBA senior vice president of replay and referee operations Joe Borgia confirmed in a September 2017 interview with the league that Pachulia's closeout would have been considered a flagrant foul under the rule change.
