= Mike Mitchell (basketball, born 1967) =

American basketball player (born 1967)

Personal information
- Born: April 4, 1967 (age 59) Los Angeles, California, U.S.
- Listed height: 202 cm (6 ft 8 in)
- Listed weight: 103 kg (227 lb)

Career information
- High school: Mater Dei (Santa Ana, California)
- College: Fresno State (1985–1988); Colorado State (1989–1990)
- NBA draft: 1990: undrafted
- Playing career: 1991–2004
- Position: Forward

Career history
- 1991–1994: Gold Coast Rollers
- 1995–1996: Brisbane Bullets
- 1997: North Melbourne Giants
- 1997–1999: Dragons Rhöndorf
- 1999–2000: Besançon BCD
- 2000–2004: Gießen 46ers

Career highlights
- All-NBL First Team (1991); All-NBL Third Team (1996); WAC Player of the Year (1990); First-team All-WAC (1990); WAC Newcomer of the Year (199); Second-team PCAA (1987); PCAA Freshman of the Year (1986)

Michael Eric Mitchell (born April 4, 1967) is an American former professional basketball player. He holds an Irish passport and played for the Irish national team in the early 2000s.

== Early life ==
Mitchell was born in Los Angeles, California, and attended Mater Dei High School in Santa Ana, California. After graduating, he attended Fresno State University from 1985 to 1988 before transferring to Colorado State where he played one final season in 1989–90.

== Professional career ==
=== Australia ===
Mitchell was the second overall pick in the 1990 CBA draft before moving to Australia.

Mitchell played in the National Basketball League (NBL) between 1991 and 1997 with the Gold Coast Rollers (1991–94), Brisbane Bullets (1995–96) and North Melbourne Giants (1997).

During the 1992 season, Mitchell suffered an horrific injury when he smashed his right arm in anger against a wire-reinforced glass panel of a locker-room door after Gold Coast narrowly lost away to the Illawarra Hawks. With his arm almost severed, Mitchell was found slumped on the floor in a pool of blood by Rollers teammate Ron Radliff. Doubt was initially cast over whether Mitchell would ever play again.

=== Europe ===
Between 1997 and 1999, Mitchell played in Germany for Dragons Rhöndorf. After a seasons in France with Besançon BCD, he returned to Germany in 2000 and played the next four seasons for Gießen 46ers. He was unable to play in the 2004–05 season due to injury and subsequently retired in 2005.

== National team career ==
Mitchell debuted for the Ireland national basketball team in 2001, playing in FIBA EuroBasket 2003 qualification.

== Coaching career ==
Mitchell began his coaching career in 2005, first as assistant coach at the University of California, Riverside for two years, and then as head coach for the Ramona High School boys' basketball team. In 2008, he joined the Chicago Sky of the WNBA as an assistant coach.

== Personal life ==
Mitchell met his now ex-wife in Australia in the 1990s. She was also American but had Irish heritage as her grandparents were born in Ireland. Mitchell gained an Irish passport through marriage.

Mitchell has two children, Donovan and Myca. Donovan, known as D. J., is also a professional basketball player.
