= Antonio Alexe =

Romanian basketball player

Personal information
- Born: December 21, 1969 Constanța, Romania
- Died: January 21, 2005 (aged 35) Sinaia, Romania
- Listed height: 1.92 m (6 ft 4 in)

Career information
- Playing career: 1988–2005
- Position: Guard

Career history
- 1988–1993: Oradea
- 1995–1998: Szolnoki Olaj
- 1999–2000: Soproni KC
- 2000–2002: West Petrom Arad
- 2002–2003: Falco KC Szombathely
- 2003–2005: CSU Asesoft Ploiesti

Antonio Alexe (21 December 1969 – 21 January 2005) was a Romanian professional basketball player.

He played for Oradea (1988-1993), Szolnoki Olaj KK (Hungary, 1995-1998), Sopron (Hungary, 1999-2000), West Petrom Arad (2000-2002), Falco KC Szombathely (Hungary, 2002-2003) and CSU Asesoft Ploiesti (2003-2005). He died in a car accident. The Arena Antonio Alexe is named after him.

== Personal life ==
He was born on 21 December 1969 in Constanţa. Alexe was married and had daughter, Paula (born 1995).

He died on 21 January 2005 in a car accident in Sinaia and over 1,500 people participated at his funeral.

== Career ==
=== Club career ===
He started playing basketball at 11 years old. In 1988 he transferred to Dinamo Oradea, where he was trained by Dan Berceanu. With him in the team, Oradea finished 3rd in the 1991/92 Romanian League, achieving the best performance in the club's history. He was declared the MVP of the Romanian League (6 times) and the MVP of the Hungarian League (3 times).

=== International career ===
He led the junior national team to a 4th place at the 1990 FIBA Europe Under-18 Championship and a year later, as a captain of the youth team he finished 5th at the FIBA Under-19 World Cup in Edmonton, Canada.

== Antonio Alexe Memorial Tournament ==
Antonio Alexe Memorial Tournament is organized in his honour.

=== 2008 edition ===
Macedonia-Austria 91-66
Romania – Swis Lion Vrsec 79-72
Austria – Romania 83-72
Macedonia-Swis Lion Vrsec 87-73
Swis Lions Vrsec – Austria 68-63
Macedonia – Romania 77-70

Standings:

1.Macedonia
2.Romania
3.Swis Lion Vrsec
4.Austria

=== 2010 edition ===
CSU Atlassib Sibiu – Szolnok 71-64
CSM Oradea – BC Mureş Târgu Mureş 84-67
BC Mureş Târgu Mureş – Szolnok 66-61
CSM Oradea – CSU Atlassib Sibiu 72-83
BC Mureş Târgu Mureş – CSU Atalssib Sibiu 93-82
CSM Oradea – Szolnok 75-69

Standings:

Team	Pld	W	L	PF	PA	PD	Pts
(Romania) CSM Oradea	3	2	1	231	219	+12	5
(Romania) BC Mureş	3	2	1	226	227	−1	5
(Romania) CSU Atlassib Sibiu	3	2	1	236	229	+7	5
(Hungary) Szolnoki Olaj KK	3	0	3	194	212	−18	3

=== 2011 edition ===
Marso Vagep Nyíregyháza – U-Mobitelco Cluj-Napoca 67-88
CSM Oradea – Factum Sport Debrecen 82-55
U-Mobitelco Cluj-Napoca – Factum Sport Debrecen 103- 69
CSM Oradea – Marso Vagep Nyíregyháza 92-66
Marso Vagep Nyíregyháza – Factum Sport Debrecen 80-67
CSM Oradea – U-Mobitelco Cluj-Napoca 85-94

Standings:

Team	Pld	W	L	PF	PA	PD	Pts
(Romania) U-Mobitelco Cluj-Napoca	3	3	0	285	221	+64	6
(Romania) CSM Oradea	3	2	1	259	215	+44	5
(Hungary) Nyíregyháza	3	1	2	213	213	0	4
(Hungary) Debreceni Vadkakasok	3	0	3	191	265	−74	3

=== 2012 edition ===
Albacomp Székesfehérvár - Atomerőmű SE 67-58
CSM Oradea - U Mobitelco Cluj 80-72
U Mobitelco Cluj - Albacomp Székesfehérvár 73-70
CSM Oradea - Atomerőmű SE 73-68
U Mobitelco Cluj - Atomerőmű SE 91-70
CSM Oradea - Albacomp Székesfehérvár 93-57

=== 2013 edition ===
CSM Oradea- Alba Székesfehérvár 87-77, BC Mureş-Marso Nyíregyháza 80-55, CSM Oradea-BC Mureş 88-74, Alba Székesfehérvár-Marso Nyíregyháza 97-58, BC Mureş-Alba Székesfehérvár 98-82, CSM Oradea-Marso Nyíregyháza 94-57.
