= Jay Larranaga =

American former professional basketball player

Los Angeles Clippers
- Title: Assistant coach
- League: NBA

Personal information
- Born: January 30, 1975 (age 51) Charlotte, North Carolina, U.S.
- Listed height: 6 ft 5 in (1.96 m)
- Listed weight: 192 lb (87 kg)

Career information
- High school: St. John's (Toledo, Ohio)
- College: Bowling Green (1993–1997)
- NBA draft: 1997: undrafted
- Playing career: 1997–2009
- Position: Shooting guard
- Coaching career: 2008–present

Career history

Playing
- 1997: Jacksonville Barracudas
- 1997–1998: Viola Reggio Calabria
- 1998–1999: Peristeri
- 1999–2000: ASVEL
- 2000–2001: Olimpia Milano
- 2001–2002: Paris Racing
- 2002–2003: Gran Canaria
- 2003–2004: Sevilla
- 2004: Virtus Roma
- 2004: Real Madrid
- 2004–2005: Viola Reggio Calabria
- 2005–2007: Napoli
- 2007: ASVEL
- 2007–2009: Juvecaserta

Coaching
- 2008–2010: Ireland
- 2010–2012: Erie BayHawks
- 2012–2021: Boston Celtics (assistant)
- 2021–present: Los Angeles Clippers (assistant)

Career highlights
- As Player: Italian Cup champion (2006); Spanish League champion (2005)

James Joseph Larranaga Jr. (born January 30, 1975) is an American professional basketball coach and former player who currently serves on the staff of the Los Angeles Clippers. He was previously the top assistant coach for the Boston Celtics of the National Basketball Association (NBA). He is also the son of University of Miami men's basketball coach Jim Larrañaga.

== Early life ==
Larranaga was born in Charlotte, North Carolina.

== Career ==
After graduating from St. John's Jesuit High School and Academy, Larranaga played college basketball for the Bowling Green Falcons alongside Antonio Daniels. Here he played all four years for his father, Jim, setting BGSU records for three-point field goals in a game, season, and career. Before his departure to Italy in 1997, Larranaga became a three-time Academic All-Mac and attained a cumulative 3.4 GPA studying business at Bowling Green State University.

Larranaga joined Peristeri B.C. in Greece for the 1998–99 season. Larranaga then moved to France to play for ASVEL Villeurbanne, he also played in and won the 2000 French All-Star game. Larranaga moved back to Italy in November 2000 to join Pallacanestro Olimpia Milano however he moved back to France to play for the Paris Basket Racing.

Larranaga then moved to Spain to play for CB Gran Canaria and CSF Sevilla. He then moved back to Italy to join Pallacanestro Virtus Roma and his former club Viola Reggio Calabria. He went back to Spain in 2004 to join Real Madrid Baloncesto where he won the Spanish National Championship. He then won the Italian National Cup with Basket Napoli in 2006 and 2008. Larranaga retired after spending two seasons in Eldo Caserta and appearing in various All-Star games throughout his lengthy career.

In 2008 Larranaga was announced as player/manager of the Ireland team. Previous to the hiring, he was captain of the Irish national team from 2001 to 2006.

== Coaching career ==
Larranaga entered his first season as an assistant coach with the Boston Celtics in 2012. He spent the previous two seasons as head coach of the Erie BayHawks of the NBA Development League. In two seasons with the BayHawks, Larranaga led his squad to consecutive playoff appearances while accumulating a regular-season record of 60–40. He also established team records for all-time wins (60), wins in a season (32), and player call-ups (12). During Larranaga's two years in Erie, eight different players received NBA call-ups. Prior to arriving in Erie, Larranaga served as an assistant coach at Cornell University in Ithaca, New York, and before that, he was head coach of the Irish National Team for two years. Larranaga spent the summer of 2012 as an assistant for the Ukraine National Team under former NBA coach Mike Fratello.

In 2013, Larranaga was interviewed by the Celtics to possibly replace Doc Rivers, but Butler basketball head coach Brad Stevens became the Celtics' new head coach. In the previous 3 seasons, Larranaga and the coaching staff led the Celtics to the Eastern Conference Playoffs including a trip to the Eastern Conference Finals in the 2016–2017 season.

Larranaga was a top candidate to fill the head coaching positions at Georgia Tech and George Mason University, but decided to stay in his position with the Boston Celtics.

In July 2021, Larranaga was hired as an assistant coach under Tyronn Lue with the Los Angeles Clippers.

== Honors ==
=== France ===
==== All-Star ====
- All-Star game winner: 2000

=== Italy ===
==== Basket Napoli ====
- Italian Basketball Cup winner: 2006

=== Spain ===
==== Real Madrid ====
- Liga ACB winner: 2005
- Copa del Rey de Baloncesto runner-up: 2005

== Personal life ==
Larranaga and his wife, Sarah, married in 2017. He has two children, daughter Tia and son James, from a previous marriage.

== See also ==
- Basketball Ireland
- List of foreign NBA coaches
