= Elvis Évora =

Cape Verde-born Portuguese basketball player

Personal information
- Born: 4 February 1978 (age 48) Sal, Cape Verde
- Listed height: 6 ft 8.7 in (2.05 m)
- Listed weight: 256 lb (116 kg)

Career information
- Playing career: 1998–2014
- Position: Center

Career history
- 1998–2005: Porto
- 2005–2006: Iberostar Tenerife
- 2006-2008: Ovarense
- 2008: Gandía Basquet
- 2009-2013: Benfica
- 2013-2014: Interclube

Elvis Garcia Monteiro Évora (born 4 February 1978) is a Portuguese former basketball player who played as a center.

He played for Porto, from 1998/1999 to 2004/2005. After a season at Iberostar Tenerife, he moved back to Portugal, playing for Ovarense, from 2006/07 to 2007/08, where he was twice National Champion. In 2008, he moved to Gandía BA, in Spain. With the season going, he signed for Benfica becoming a starter and a very important player for the team. He plays for Portugal since 2000. He had 95 caps by October 2007. Elvis Évora played at the EuroBasket 2007 finals, where Portugal reached the 2nd phase.

== Titles ==
=== Ovarense Aerosoles ===
- Liga Portuguesa de Basquetebol: 2
  - 2006–07, 2007–08

=== Benfica ===
- Liga Portuguesa de Basquetebol: 4
  - 2008–09, 2009–10, 2011–12, 2012−13
- Taça da Liga / Hugo dos Santos: 2
  - 2010–11, 2012−13
- Supertaça: 3
  - 2008–09, 2009–10, 2012−13
- António Pratas Trophy: 2
  - 2008–09, 2011–12
- Supertaça Portugal-Angola: 1
  - 2009–10
