= Dimitar Angelov =

Bulgarian basketball player

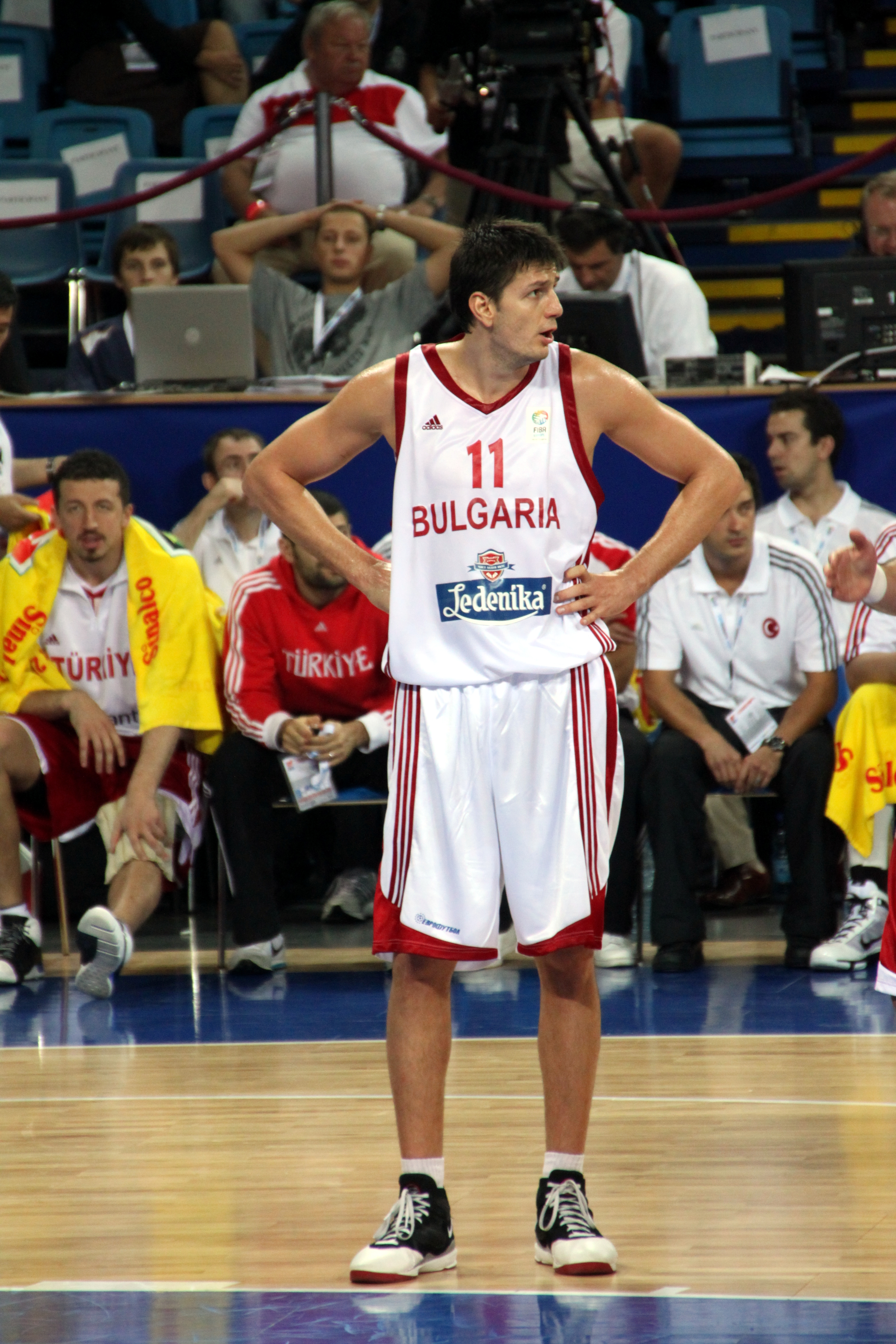

Levski Sofia
- Title: Head coach
- League: NBL

Personal information
- Born: August 25, 1979 (age 47) Yambol, Bulgaria
- Listed height: 6 ft 7.5 in (2.02 m)
- Listed weight: 198 lb (90 kg)

Career information
- Playing career: 1997–2016
- Position: Power forward / small forward

Career history

Playing
- 1997–2002: BC Yambol
- 2002–2003: Aris
- 2003–2005: CSKA Sofia
- 2005–2006: BC Kyiv
- 2006–2007: CSKA Sofia
- 2007: BC Yambol
- 2007–2008: Olympia Larissa
- 2008–2009: Lukoil Academic
- 2009–2010: BC Yambol
- 2010–2011: Achilleas
- 2011–2016: Levski Sofia

Coaching
- 2022-present: Levski Sofia

Career highlights
- 3× NBL champion (2002, 2009, 2014); 2× Bulgarian Cup winner (2005, 2014); FIBA Champions Cup champion (2003); Balkan International Basketball League champion (2014); FIBA EuroCup All-Star Day (2005)

Dimitar Angelov (born August 25, 1979) is retired Bulgarian professional basketball player. He plays as a power forward or small forward and his height is 202 cm. Angelov currently is the head coach for Levski Sofia in the Bulgarian League and assistant in Bulgaria national basketball team. He is known as the Bulgarian Kukoc, due to similar style of play with Toni Kukoč. He played in two European Basketball Championships (EuroBasket 2005 and EuroBasket 2009). Angelov is a son of the former player and coach for BC Yambol Ivan Angelov.

== Professional career ==
Angelov began his career in his hometown with Yambol in 1995, where he played until 2002. In this period his club won the league in 2002, where he averaged 17.1 points, 5.9 rebounds, 2.4 assists. His best statistical season was the previous where he averaged 20.1 points, 7.7 rebounds, 1.4 assists. In this season Yambol went to the finals, but lost to Levski. In 02-03 season, he moved to Greece to play for Aris, where he won FIBA Champions Cup champion. The next season he signed with CSKA, he played two years for the army man, where he won the Bulgarian Basketball Cup in 2005 and two lost finals playoffs in NBL. In July 2005 he signed with BC Kyiv for three years, but returned the next season in CSKA. He started 2007/08 season in Yambol, where he played 9 games, but moved to Olympia Larissa in November 2007. The next season he signed with PBC Academic, but was released in the end of April, due to a conflict with the head coach Georgi Mladenov. He returned for 2009/10 season in Yambol for the third and last time. The next season he played in Achilleas Kaimakli. In 2011 he signed with Levski, where he played until 2015-16 season. There he won one cup and league, both in 2014.

== Coaching career ==
On August 3, 2022, Angelov was promoted by the Levski as a head coach, after being an assistant in the last seasons. In November 2019, he signed as an assistant in Bulgaria national basketball team.
