= Jacques Stas =

Belgian basketball coach and former player

Personal information
- Born: 6 February 1969 (age 57) Grivegnée, Belgium
- Listed height: 6 ft 3 in (1.91 m)
- Listed weight: 193 lb (88 kg)

Career information
- Playing career: 1989–2006
- Coaching career: 2006–present

Career history

Coaching
- 2006–2009: Spirou Charleroi (assistant)
- 2009–present: Belgium (assistant)
- 2014–2016: Spirou Charleroi

Jacques Stas (born 6 February 1969) is a Belgian professional basketball coach and former national team player. He is an assistant coach for Belgium's national basketball team.

His last team as an active player was Spirou Charleroi in Belgium.
