= Kenyon Jones (basketball) =

American basketball player

Personal information
- Born: October 12, 1977
- Died: August 18, 2005 (aged 27) Atlanta, Georgia
- Listed height: 6 ft 10 in (2.08 m)
- Listed weight: 270 lb (122 kg)

Career information
- High school: Beach (Savannah, Georgia)
- College: California (1995–1998); San Francisco (1999–2000)
- NBA draft: 2000: undrafted
- Playing career: 2000–2005
- Position: Center

Career history
- 2000–2001: STB Le Havre
- 2001–2002: Panionios
- 2002: Vaqueros de Bayamón
- 2002–2003: Maroussi
- 2003: Vaqueros de Bayamón
- 2003: Panathinaikos
- 2003–2004: Dynamo Moscow
- 2004–2005: Maroussi

Career highlights
- Greek League All-Star (2003); WCC Player of the Year (2000); First-team All-WCC (2000)

Kenyon Jones (October 12, 1977 – August 18, 2005) was an American professional basketball player. At 6 ft 10 in (2.08 m) tall, he played at the center position. He played four seasons in Greece's top league, the Greek Basket League.

== College career ==
Jones, from Beach High School, in Savannah, Georgia, signed with head coach Todd Bozeman at the University of California, Berkeley. Jones played three seasons for the Golden Bears, averaging 6.0 points and 3.0 rebounds per game as a junior in the 1997–98 season.

Jones then transferred to the University of San Francisco for his senior season. There he averaged 16.5 points and was named West Coast Conference player of the year.

== Professional career ==
After graduation, Jones played four seasons in the Greek top-tier level Greek Basket League, with Panionios, Panathinaikos, and Maroussi. He also played with the Russian club Dynamo Moscow, during the 2003–04 season. Jones was invited to play with the Denver Nuggets NBA Summer League squad in 2005, but he did not make the team.

== National team career ==
Jones was also a part of the senior North Macedonia national basketball team.

== Death ==
Jones died on August 18, 2005, at his home in Atlanta, Georgia. The basketball website Eurobasket.com, reported that he died of a heart attack.
