= Slam dunk =

Basketball technique

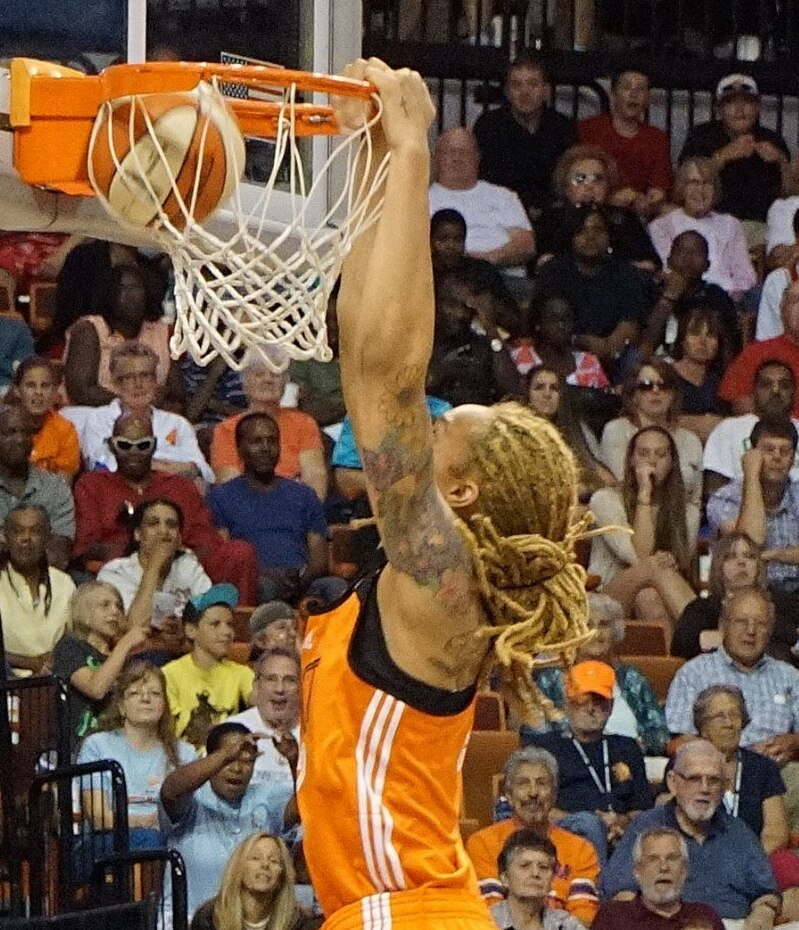
Brittney Griner dunking at the 2015 WNBA All-Star Game

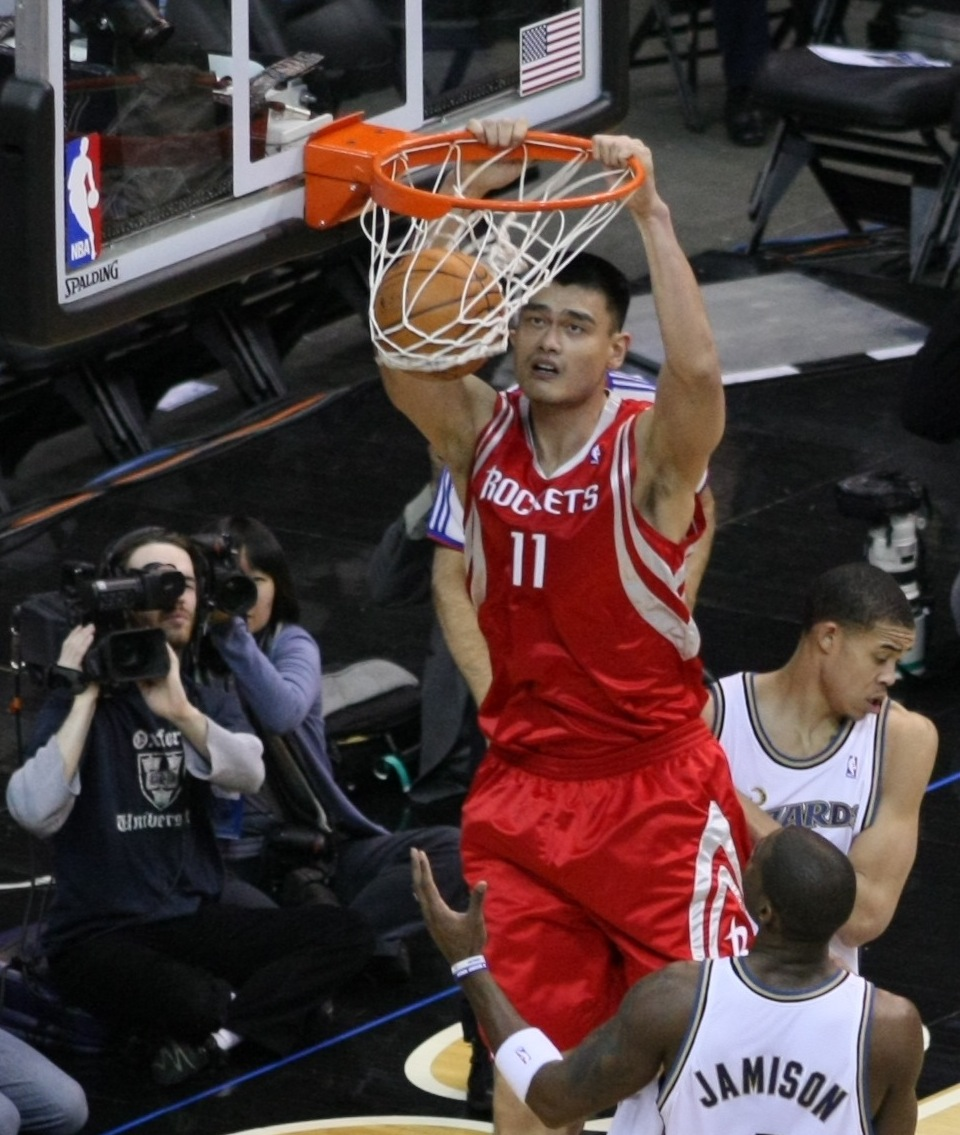
Yao Ming dunking in 2008

A slam dunk, also simply known as a dunk, is a type of basketball shot that is performed when a player jumps in the air, controls the ball above the horizontal plane of the rim, and shoves the ball directly through the basket with either one or both hands. It is a type of field goal that is worth two points. Such a shot was known as a "dunk shot" until the term "slam dunk" was coined by former Los Angeles Lakers announcer Chick Hearn.

The slam dunk is usually the highest percentage shot and a crowd-pleaser. Thus, the maneuver is often taken from the basketball game and showcased in slam dunk contests such as the NBA Slam Dunk Contest held during the annual NBA All-Star Weekend. The first incarnation of the NBA Slam Dunk Contest was held during the half-time of the 1976 ABA All-Star Game.

A study was carried out in 2015 to show the effectiveness of different shot types, including slam dunks. The study was carried out across five different levels of basketball (NBA, EuroBasket, the Slovenian 1st Division, and two minor leagues). Overall the study showed that slam dunks were a very effective way of scoring in the game of basketball, particularly in the NBA, which had the highest dunk percentage in the study.

== History ==
Joe Fortenberry, playing for the McPherson Globe Refiners, dunked the ball in 1936 in Madison Square Garden. The feat was immortalized by Arthur Daley, Pulitzer Prize winning sports writer for The New York Times in an article in March 1936. He wrote that Joe Fortenberry and his teammate, Willard Schmidt, instead of shooting up for a layup, leaped up and "pitch[ed] the ball downward into the hoop, much like a cafeteria customer dunking a roll in coffee".

During the 1940s, 7-foot center and Olympic gold medalist Bob Kurland was dunking regularly during games. Yet defenders viewed the execution of a slam dunk as a personal affront that deserved retribution; thus defenders often intimidated offensive players and thwarted the move. Kurland's rival big man George Mikan noted "We used to dunk in pregame practice, not in the game." Satch Sanders, a career Boston Celtic from 1960 to 1973, said: "in the old days, [defenders] would run under you when you were in the air ... trying to take people out of games so they couldn't play. It was an unwritten rule."

Still, by the 1950s and early 1960s some of the NBA's tallest and strongest centers such as Bill Russell and Wilt Chamberlain had incorporated the move into their offensive arsenal. Slightly smaller players at forward and guard then began to dunk, helping to popularize the move, like "Jumping" Johnny Green, Gus Johnson, Elgin Baylor, and Connie Hawkins in the 1960s and David Thompson and Julius Erving in the 1970s. This transformed dunking into the standard fare it is today.

=== 1956 rule changes ===
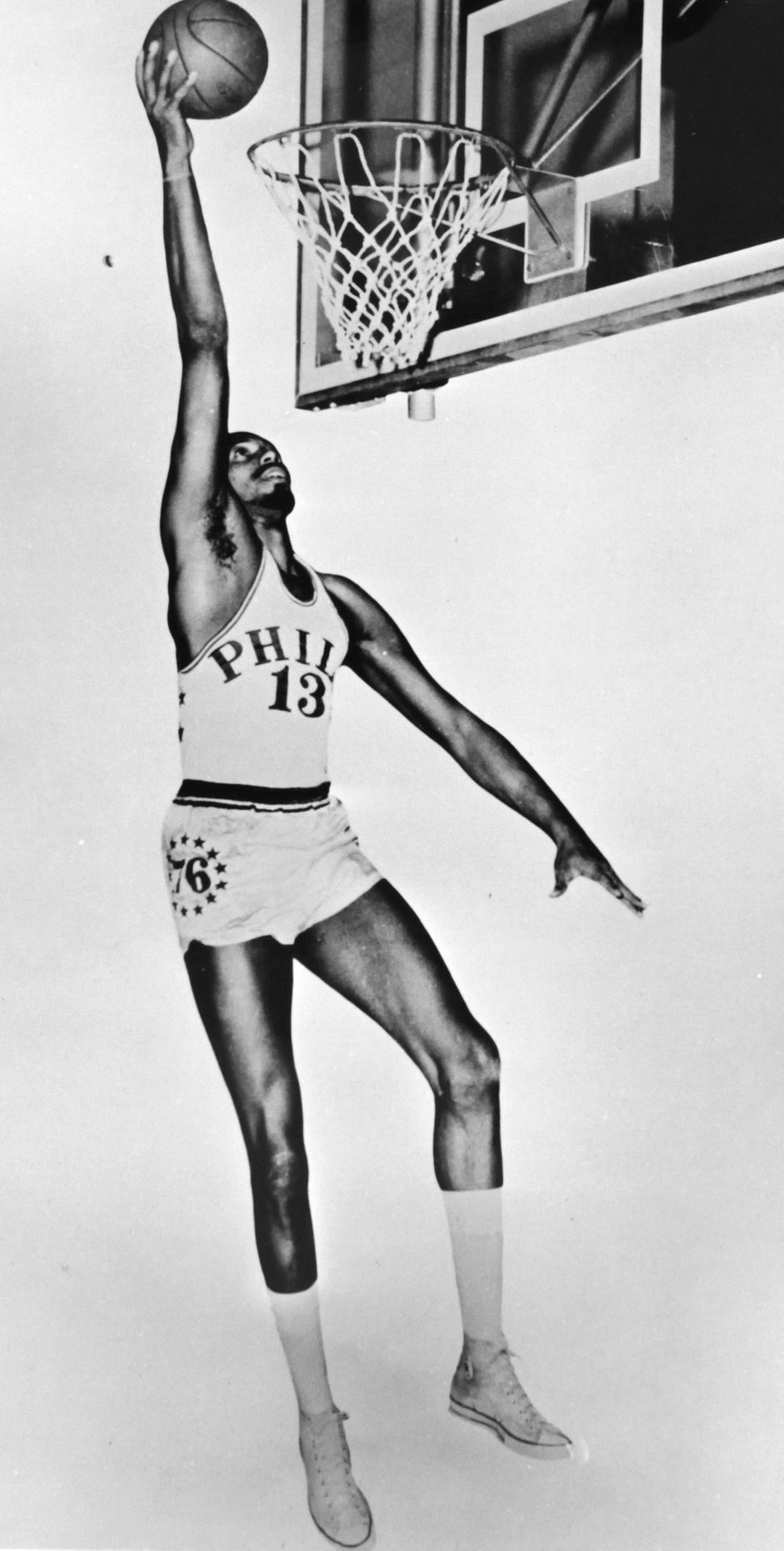
Wilt Chamberlain in 1967.

In the 1950s, Jim Pollard and Wilt Chamberlain had both dunked from the free throw line—15 feet from the basket. Chamberlain was able to dunk from the free-throw line without a running start, beginning his forward movement from within the top half of the free-throw circle. This was the catalyst for the 1956 NCAA rule change which requires that a shooter maintain both feet behind the line during a free-throw attempt. An inbounds pass over the backboard was also banned because of Chamberlain. Offensive goaltending, also called basket interference, was introduced as a rule in 1956 after Bill Russell had exploited it at San Francisco and Chamberlain was soon to enter college play. While at the University of Kansas, Chamberlain was known to have dunked on an experimental 12-foot basket set up by Phog Allen. (Note: Michael Wilson, a former Harlem Globetrotter and University of Memphis basketball player, matched this feat on 1 April 2000 and got into the Guinness World Records, albeit with an alley-oop.) When Chamberlain dunked the ball it was called a "dipper dunk."

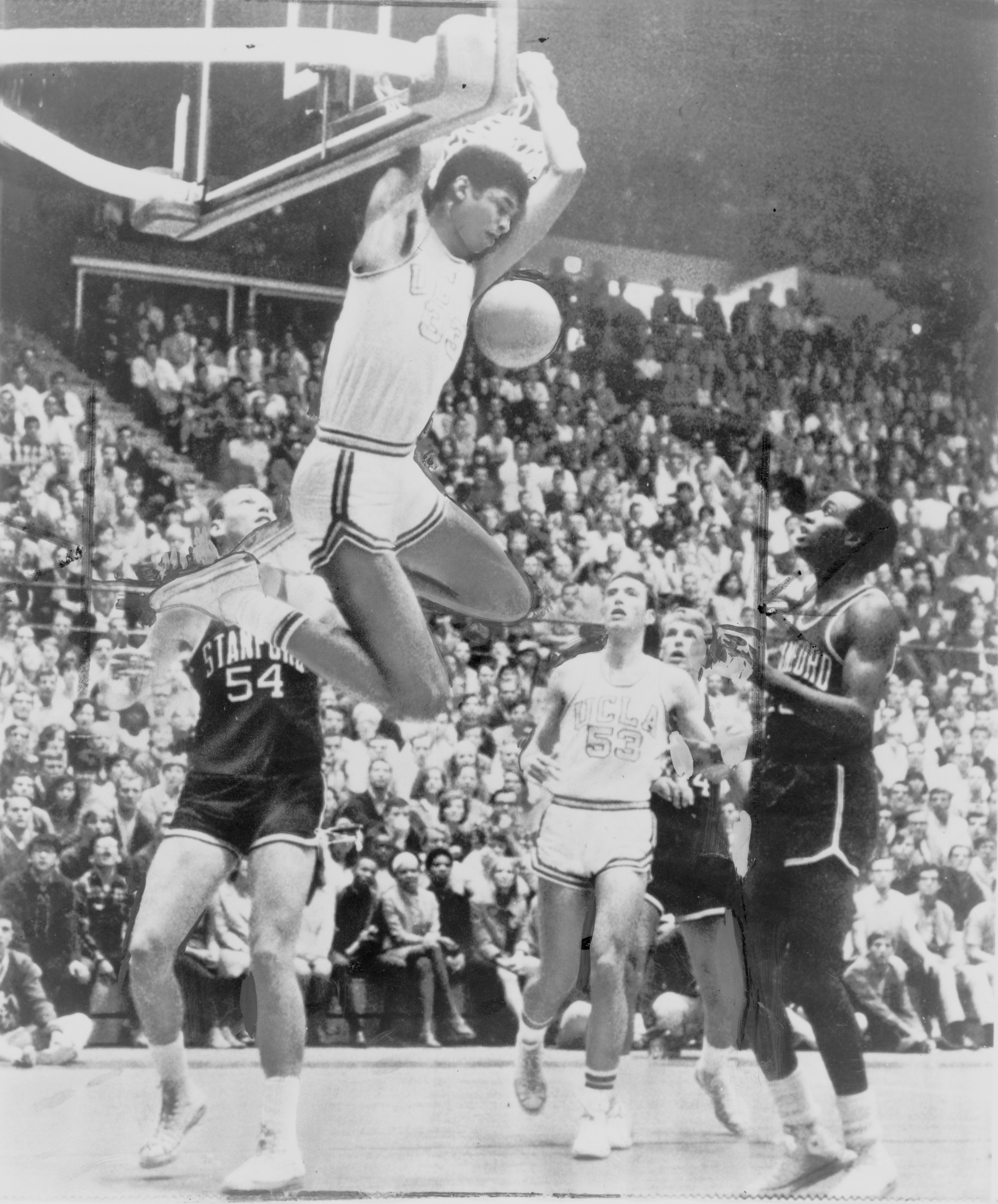
A dunk by Alcindor

=== Lew Alcindor rule ===
Dunking was banned in the NCAA and high school sports from 1967 to 1976. Many people have attributed the ban to the dominance of the college phenomenon Lew Alcindor (now known as Kareem Abdul-Jabbar); the no-dunking rule is sometimes referred to as the "Lew Alcindor rule." Others have attributed the ban to racial motivations, as at the time most of the prominent dunkers in college basketball were African-American, and the ban took place less than a year after the 1966 NCAA University Division basketball championship game, wherein a Texas Western team with an all-black starting lineup beat an all-white Kentucky team to win the national championship. Under head coach Guy Lewis, Houston (with Elvin Hayes) made considerable use of the "stuff" shot on their way to the Final Four in 1967.

=== Breakaway rims ===
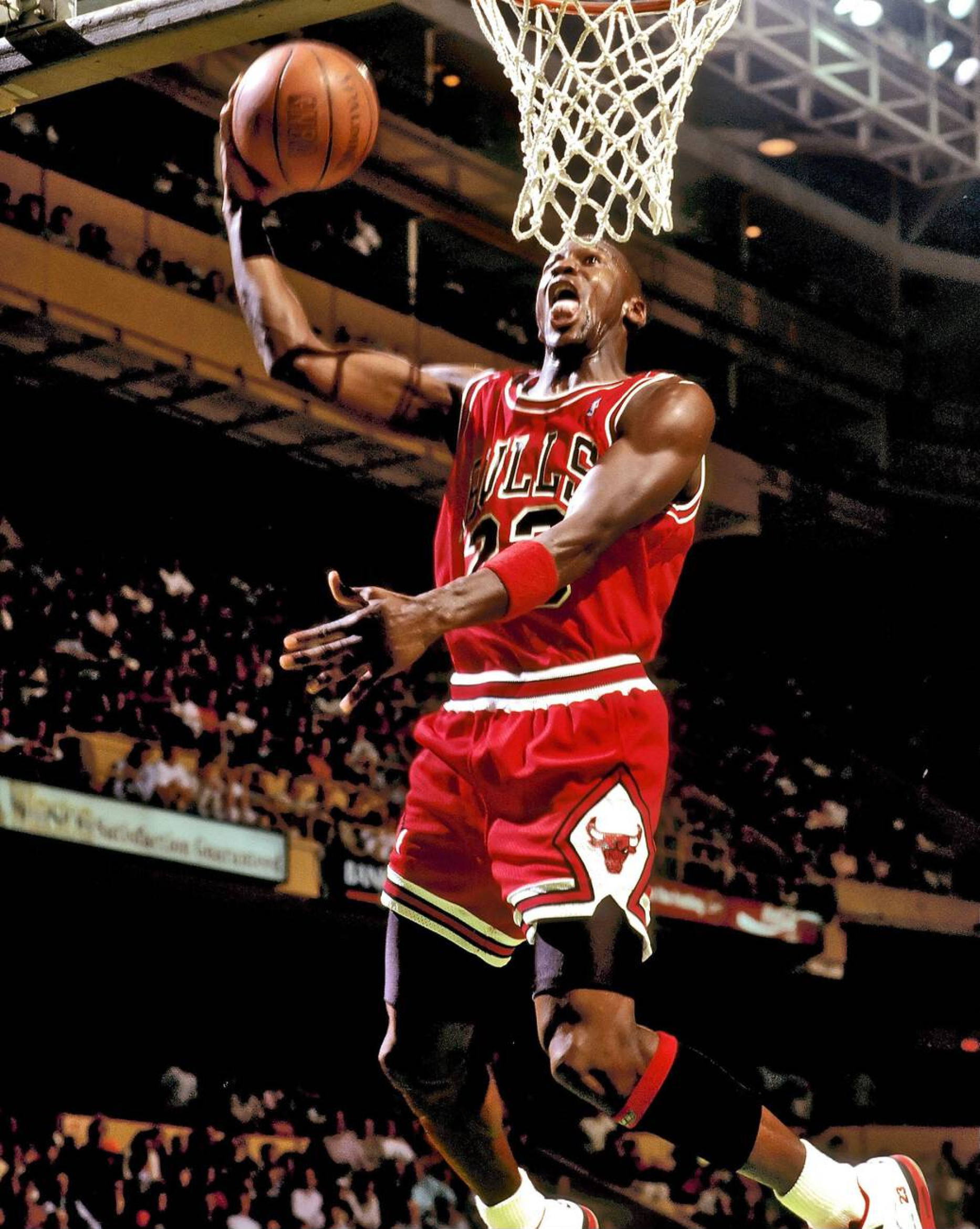
Michael Jordan dunking in 1987

In the NBA, in 1976 Arthur Erhat filed a patent for "a rim that had give but immediately returned to its original position," making dunking safe for the first time by significantly reducing the shattering of backboards. In 1979, Erving's teammate and center Darryl Dawkins twice shattered NBA backboards with dunks leading to a quickly-enacted rule making it an offence to break the backboard. Technology has evolved to adapt to the increased strength and weight of players to withstand the force of such dunks, such as the breakaway rim (introduced to the NBA in 1981) changes to the material used for the backboards, and strengthening of the goal standards themselves. The invention by Arthur Ehrat to create the breakaway rim with a spring on it led to the return of the dunk in college basketball.

All-star power forward Gus Johnson of the Baltimore Bullets was the first of the famous backboard breakers in the NBA, shattering three during his career in the 1960s and early 1970s. (Note: In one game, Chamberlain dislocated the shoulder of Johnson by blocking his dunk attempt.) Luke Jackson also shattered a backboard in 1968. In the ABA, Charlie Hentz broke two backboards in the same game on 6 November 1970 resulting in the game being called. (Note: In the NCAA, Jerome Lane shattered a backboard while playing for Pitt in a 1988 regular-season game against Providence, and Darvin Ham did the same while playing for Texas Tech in a tournament game against North Carolina in 1996. The Premier Basketball League has had two slam-dunks that have resulted in broken backboards. Both came consecutively in the 2008 and 2009 PBL Finals, and both were achieved by Sammy Monroe of the Rochester Razorsharks.)

The NBA has made shattering the backboard a technical foul, although it will not count towards a player's count of seven that can draw a suspension, or two towards ejection from a game, though it counts towards a player's count of six personal fouls. This has assisted in deterring this action, as it can cost the team points.

=== Slam Dunk Contest era ===
The first-ever Slam Dunk Contest was held on January 27, 1976 at McNichols Sports Arena in Denver during halftime of the 1976 ABA All-Star Game, the league's final All-Star game before the completion of the ABA–NBA merger. Erving defeated Thompson in the championship round, after leaping from the free-throw line. The other participants were Artis Gilmore, George Gervin, and Larry Kenon.

The NBA held its first Slam Dunk Contest as a one-off, season-long event similar to NBA Horse event held the following season. During halftime at each game, there was a one-on-one slam dunk competition. Former ABA player Darnell "Dr. Dunk" Hillman was named the winner that season. Although he received the winner's $15,000 check, Hillman did not receive a trophy until 2017.

==== Modern era ====
The Houston Cougars from 1982 to 1984, with Hakeem Olajuwon and Clyde Drexler, were known as Phi Slama Jama. The national champion 1982 North Carolina Tar Heels also featured two notable dunkers: James Worthy and Michael Jordan.

Larry Nance won the first modern dunk contest in 1984. Spud Webb at 5 ft 7 in (1.70 m) defeated 6 ft 8 in (2.03 m) Dominique Wilkins in the 1986 dunk contest.

Michael Jordan nicknamed "Air Jordan" for his dunking ability, popularized a dunk referred to by some fans as the "Leaner" in 1987 contest. This dunk was so called because Jordan's body was not perpendicular to the ground while performing the dunk. TNT viewers rated it "the best dunk of all time" over Vince Carter's between-the-legs slam. In the 1988 NBA Slam Dunk Contest, which came down to Michael Jordan and Dominique Wilkins, Jordan dunked from the free-throw line, much like Erving, but parted his legs making his dunk arguably more memorable than Erving's.

Twice in his rookie season (1992–93) during games, center Shaquille O'Neal dunked so hard that he broke the hydraulic support of one goal standard (against the Phoenix Suns) and broke the welds holding up another goal standard, causing the basket to break off and fall to the floor (against the New Jersey Nets), although in neither case did the glass break. This resulted in reinforced backboard supports as well. During that same season, New Jersey's Chris Morris shattered a backboard in a game against the Chicago Bulls (the most recent shattered-backboard incident in the NBA to date).

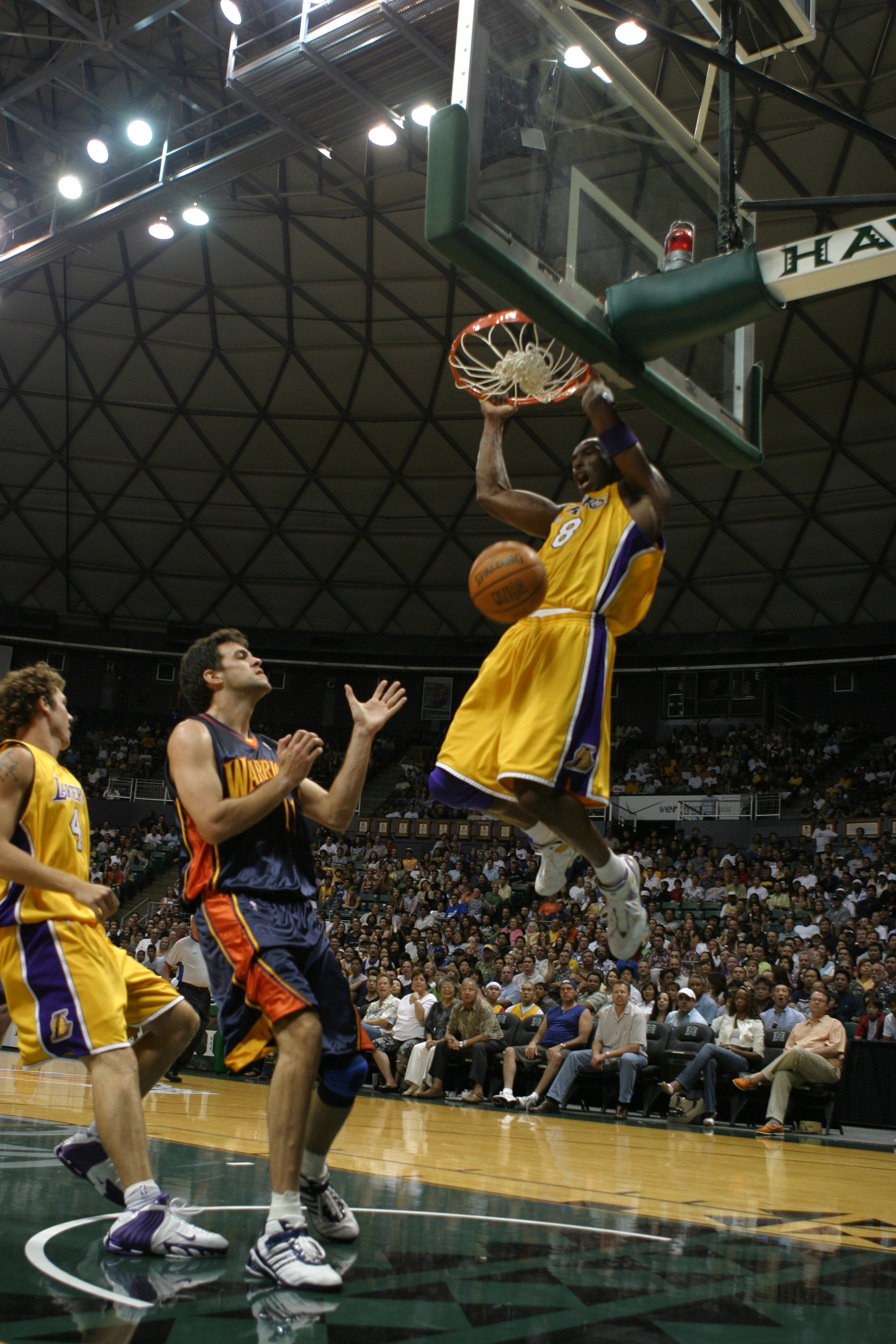
Kobe Bryant dunking in 2005

In the 1996 NBA Slam Dunk Contest, winner Brent Barry dunked from the free-throw line. Barry received 49 (out of 50) for the dunk. Kobe Bryant won the 1997 Dunk Contest.

==== 2000–present ====
Vince Carter dunked while leaping over 7-foot-2 (2.18 m) French center Frédéric Weis in the 2000 Summer Olympics. The French media dubbed it "le dunk de la mort"—"the dunk of death". In the 2000 dunk contest Carter used an elbow hang along with his reverse 360 windmill dunk (reminiscent of Kenny Walker's 360 windmill dunk in 1989 except that Carter spins clockwise, whereas Walker spins counter-clockwise) and between-the-legs dunk. When performed, much of the audience was speechless, including the judges, because none had seen these types of dunks before.

In the 2008 Sprite Rising Star's Slam Dunk Contest Dwight Howard performed the "Superman" dunk. He donned a Superman outfit as Orlando Magic guard Jameer Nelson tied a cape around his shoulders. Nelson alley-ooped the basketball as Howard jumped from within the key side of the free throw circle line, caught the ball, and threw it through the rim. This dunk is somewhat controversial, as his hand was not over as well as on a vertical plane to the rim. Some insist that it should in fact be considered a dunk because the ball was thrust downward into the basket, meeting the basic definition of the dunk.

During the 2009 NBA dunk contest, Howard had a separate goal brought onto the court, and the rim was noticeably significantly higher than a standard goal. Howard, after going into a 1950s-era telephone booth and again fashioning the Superman attire, caught a pass from Nelson and easily completed a two-handed dunk on the higher goal. While this was not performed for record-setting purposes, the dunk received a perfect score and a warm response from the crowd, in part because of its theatrics. Also in this contest, 5'9" guard Nate Robinson wore a green New York Knicks jersey and green sneakers to represent Kryptonite, playing on Howard's Superman theme. He used a green "Kryptonite" ball, and jumped over the 6'11" Howard prior to dunking. This dunk and the theatrics could have won the competition for Robinson, who was voted the winner by the NBA fans. Robinson then thanked Howard for graciously allowing him to dunk over him, asking the crowd to also give Howard a round of applause.

More recently, the Clippers earned the nickname "Lob City" from 2011 onwards, with Chris Paul utilizing alley-oop passes regularly to teammates Blake Griffin, and DeAndre Jordan.

JaVale McGee currently holds the world record for Most Basketball Dunks in a Single Jump: three. While competing in the 2011 NBA Sprite Slam Dunk Contest, McGee jumped with two balls in his possession and dunked each prior to receiving and slamming an alley-oop pass from then teammate John Wall.

In the 2016 NBA Slam Dunk Contest, Zach LaVine dunked from the free throw line on three occasions: One Hand, Windmill, and Between the Legs. All of the Dunks received a score of 50 for the dunk and won the Dunk contest.

== Dunk types ==
Dunk types reflect the various motions performed on the way to the basket. They start with the basic one- or two-hand forward-facing dunk and go on through various levels of athleticism and intricacy. Discrete dunk types can be modified by appending other moves; for example, a player who passes the ball off the backboard, catches it in the air, and executes a double-pump dunk would be said to have completed a "self-pass off the backboard, double pump".

=== Tomahawk ===
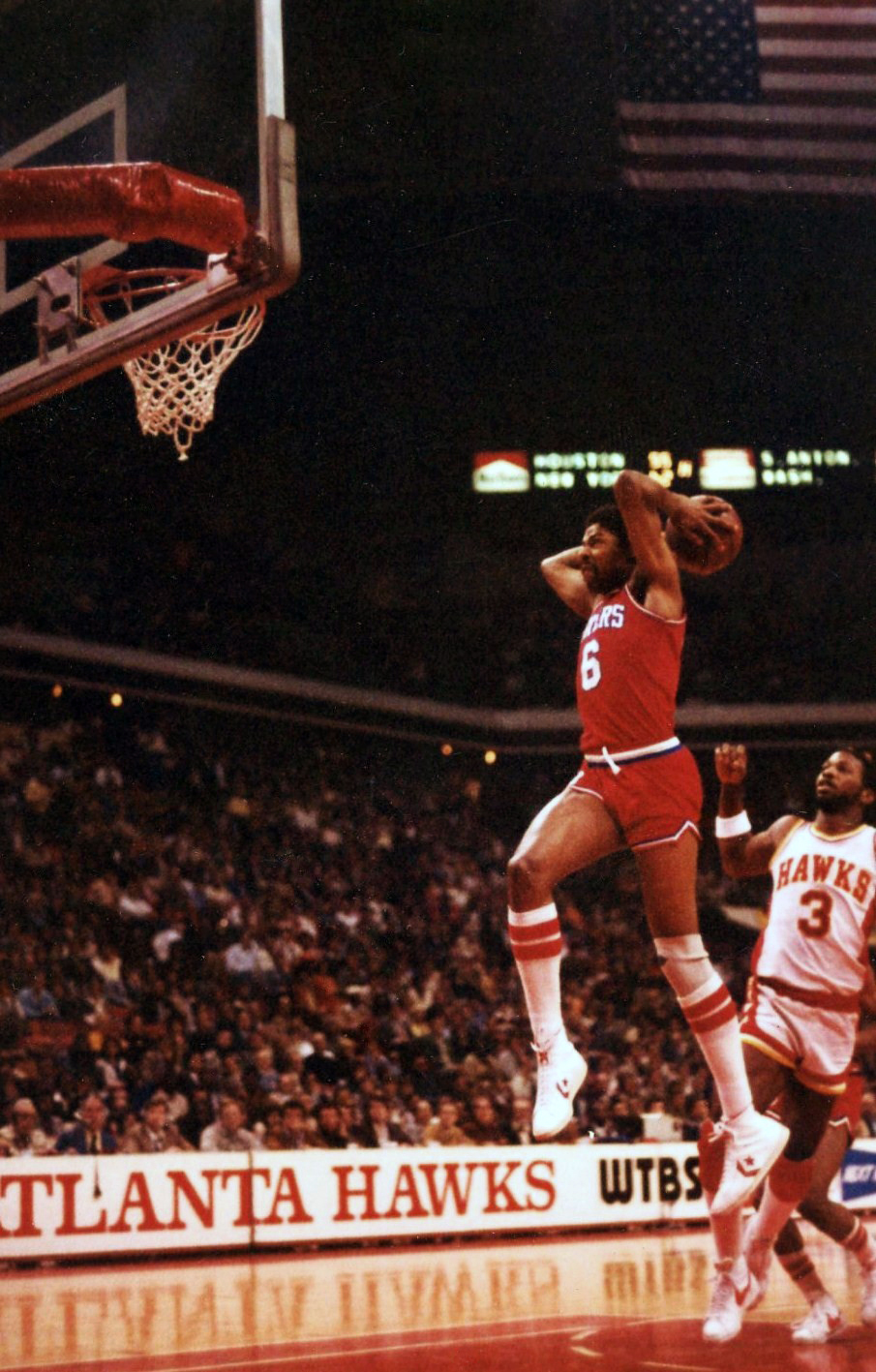
Julius Erving performing a "backscratcher" tomahawk dunk in 1981

One of the simplest dunk types is the "tomahawk" dunk, resembling the windup and sharp downward motion of a blow with a tomahawk. A tomahawk dunk can be performed with one or two hands, and when two hands are used, it is called a backscratcher. Initially referred to as a gorilla dunk, that term is uncommon now. During the jump, the ball is raised above, and often behind the player's head for a wind-up before slamming the ball down into the net at the apex of the jump. Due to the undemanding body mechanics involved in execution, the tomahawk is employed by players of all sizes and jumping abilities. Because of the ball-security provided by the use of both hands, the two-handed tomahawk is a staple of game situations—frequently employed in alley-oops and in offense-rebound put-back dunks.

In one common variation, a 360° spin may be completed prior to or simultaneously with the tomahawk. Circa 2009, independent slam dunker Troy McCray pioneered an especially complex variant of the dunk: once the tomahawk motion is complete, instead of slamming the ball in the rim, a windmill dunk (see below) is then performed.

=== Windmill ===
Before takeoff, or at the onset of the jump, the ball is brought to the abdomen and then the windmill motion is started by moving the ball below the waist according to the length of the player's fully extended arm. Then following the rotation of the outstretch arm, the ball is moved in a circular motion, typically moving from the front towards the back, and then slammed through the rim. Although, due to momentum, many players are unable to palm the ball through the entire windmill motion, the dunk is often completed with one-hand as centripetal force allows the player to guide the ball with only their dunking hand. In some instances sticky resins or powders may be applied to the palm, these are thought to improve grip and prevent loss of possession. Amongst players, subtle variations in the direction of the windmill depend on bodily orientation at takeoff and also jumping style (one-foot or two-feet) in relation to dominant hand.

There are a number of variations on the windmill, the most common being the aforementioned one- or two-hand variants. In these cases, the windmill motion may be performed with the previously discussed one-arm technique and finished with one- or two-hands, or the player may control the ball with two hands, with both arms performing the windmill motion, finishing with one or both hands. Additionally, the ball may be cuffed between the hand and the forearm—generally with the dominant hand. The cuff technique provides better ball security, allowing for a faster windmill motion and increased force exerted on the basket at finish, with either one or both hands. Using the cuffing method, players are also afforded the opportunity of performing the windmill motion towards the front, a technique exploited by French athlete Kadour Ziani when he pioneered his trademark double-windmill.

Occasionally in the game setting, the windmill is performed via alley-oop but is rarely seen in offense-rebound putback dunks due to the airtime required. Dominique Wilkins popularized powerful windmills—in games as well as in contests—including two-handed, self-pass, 360°, rim-hang, and combined variants thereof.

=== Double Clutch ===
At the onset of the jump, the ball is controlled by either one or both hands and once in the air is typically brought to chest level. The player will then quickly thrust the ball downwards and fully extend their arms, bringing the ball below the waist. Finally the ball is brought above the head and dunked with one or both hands; and the double clutch appears as one fluid motion. As a demonstration of athletic prowess, the ball may be held in the below-the-waist position for milliseconds longer, thus showcasing the player's hang time (jumping ability).

Whether the result of a 180° spin or body angle at takeoff, the double clutch is generally performed with the player's back toward the rim. While this orientation is rather conducive to the double clutch motion, Spud Webb was known to perform this dunk while facing the basket. Additionally, Kenny "Sky" Walker, Tracy McGrady—in the 1989 and 2000 NBA Contests, respectively—and others, have performed 360° variation of the double clutch (McGrady completed a lob self-pass before the dunk). Circa 2007, independent slam dunker T-Dub performed the double clutch with a 540° spin which he concluded by hanging on the rim.

=== Between the Legs ===
For one-footed jumpers, the ball is generally transferred to the non-dominant hand just before or upon take-off; for two-footers, this transfer is often delayed for milliseconds as both hands control the ball to prevent dropping it. Once airborne, the dunker generally transfers the ball from non-dominant to dominant hand beneath a raised leg. Finally, the ball is brought upwards by the dominant hand and slammed through the rim.

The between-the-legs dunk was popularized by Isaiah Rider in the 1994 NBA slam dunk contest, who called it "The East Bay Funk Dunk," so much so that the dunk is often colloquially referred to as a "Rider dunk"—notwithstanding Orlando Woolridge's own such dunk in the NBA contest a decade earlier. Since then, the under-the-leg has been attempted in the NBA contest by a number of participants, and has been a staple of other contests as well. Its difficulty—due to the required hand-eye coordination, flexibility, and hang-time—keeps it generally reserved for exhibitions and contests, not competitive games. Ricky Davis has managed to complete the dunk in an NBA game, but both he and Josh Smith have botched at least one in-game attempt as well.

Because of the possible combinations of starting and finishing hands, and raised-legs, there are many variations on the basic under-the-legs dunk—more so than any other. For example, in a 1997 French Dunk contest, Dali Taamallah leapt with his right leg while controlling the ball with his left hand, and once airborne he transferred the ball from his left hand, underneath his right leg to his right hand before completing the dunk. NBA star Jason Richardson has also pioneered several notable variations of the between-the-legs including a lob-pass to himself and a pass off of the backboard to himself. Independent athlete Shane 'Slam' Wise introduced a cuffed-cradle of the ball prior to initiating the under the leg transfer and finishing with two-hands. While a number of players have finished the dunk using one- or two-hands with their backs to the rim, perhaps the most renowned variant of the dunk is the combination with a 360°, or simply stated: a 360-between-the-legs. Due to the athleticism and hang-time required, the dunk is a crowd favorite and is heralded by players as the preeminent of all dunks. The dunk was once done by Zach LaVine during the 2015 Slam Dunk Contest, which he called the “Space Jam Dunk”.

=== Elbow Hang ===
The player approaches the basket and leaps as they would for a generic dunk. Instead of simply dunking the ball with one or two hands, the player allows their forearm(s) to pass through the basket, hooking their elbow pit on the rim before hanging for a short period of time. Although the dunk was introduced by Vince Carter in the 2000 NBA Slam Dunk contest, Kobe Bryant was filmed performing the dunk two years earlier in 1998 at an exhibition in the Philippines and during the 1997 offseason at Magic Johnson's A Midsummer Night's Magic charity event as well as Roy Hinson who performed the dunk during warm-ups for the 1986 NBA Slam Dunk contest. Colloquially, the dunk has a variety of names including 'honey dip', 'cookie jar', and 'elbow hook'.

In the 2011 NBA contest, Los Angeles Clippers power-forward Blake Griffin completed a self-pass off of the backboard prior to elbow-hanging on the rim. A number of other variants of the elbow hang have been executed, including a lob self-pass, hanging by the arm pit, a windmill, and over a person. Most notable are two variations which as of July 2012, have yet to be duplicated. In 2008, Canadian athlete Justin Darlington introduced an iteration aptly entitled a 'double-elbow hang', in which the player inserts both forearms through the rim and subsequently hangs on both elbows pits. Circa 2009, French athlete Guy Dupuy demonstrated the ability to perform a between-the-legs elbow hang; however, Guy opted not to hang on the rim by his elbow, likely because the downward moment could have resulted in injury.

=== Alley-oop ===
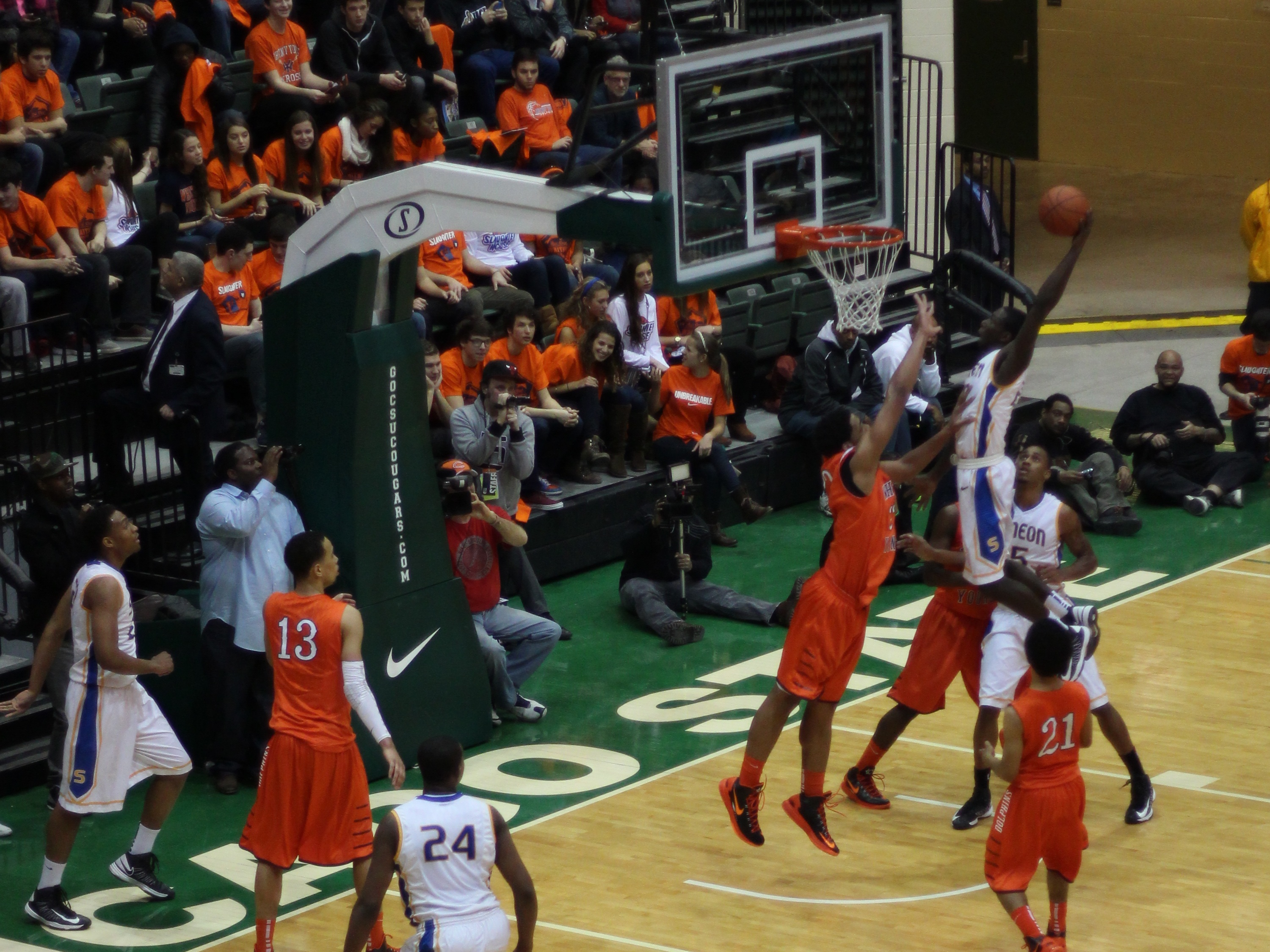
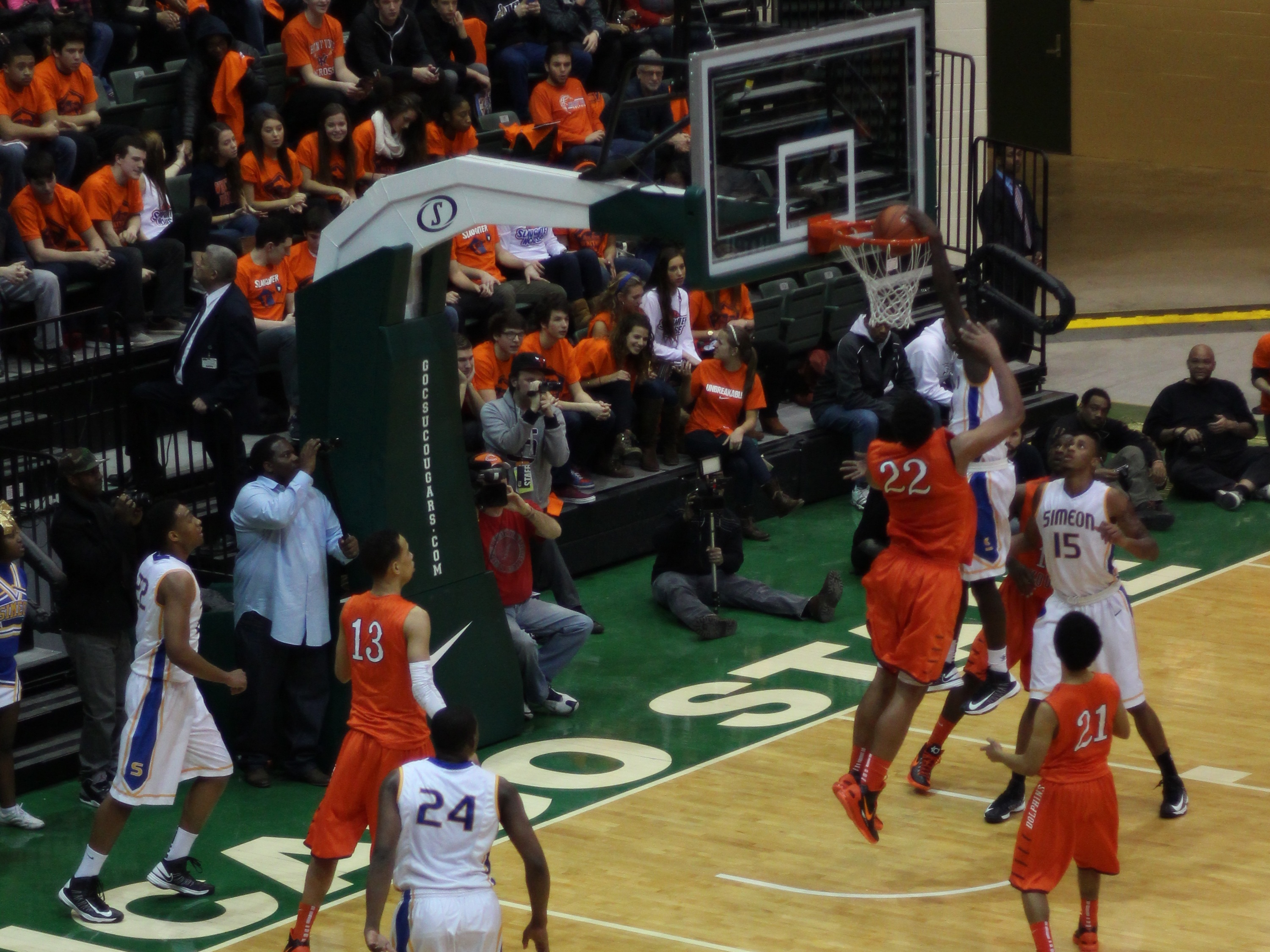
Kendrick Nunn catches an inbounds pass from Jabari Parker (far left) with one hand and performs an alley oop dunk, catching the defender offguard.

An alley-oop dunk, as it is colloquially known, is performed when a pass is caught in the air and then dunked. The application of an alley-oop to a slam dunk occurs in both games and contests. In games, when only fractions of a second remain on the game or shot clock, an alley-oop may be attempted on in-bound pass because neither clock resumes counting down until an in-bounds player touches the ball. The images to the right depict an interval spanning 1/5 of a second.

=== Other ===
James White in the 2006 NCAA Slam Dunk Contest successfully performed tomahawk and windmill variations of the foul-line dunk. Though he was unable to complete a between-the-legs from the foul line at that contest, he has been known to execute it on other occasions.

In the 2008 NBA Slam Dunk Contest, Jamario Moon leaped from the foul-line then, using his non-dominant hand, caught and dunked a bounce-pass from teammate Jason Kapono.

Independent 6'2" North American athlete Eric Bishop introduced a dunk entitled the 'Paint Job'. The title is in reference to the key on a basketball court, often known as 'paint' in common parlance. Approaching along the baseline with a running dribble, Bishop jumped with one-foot at the border of the key, dunked with one-hand while gliding over the key and landed just beyond the border on the side opposite his take-off—a 16-foot flight.

At least one player has performed a 720 degree dunk (that is, two full turns in the air): Taurian Fontenette also known as Air Up There during a Streetball game.

== Dunking in women's play ==
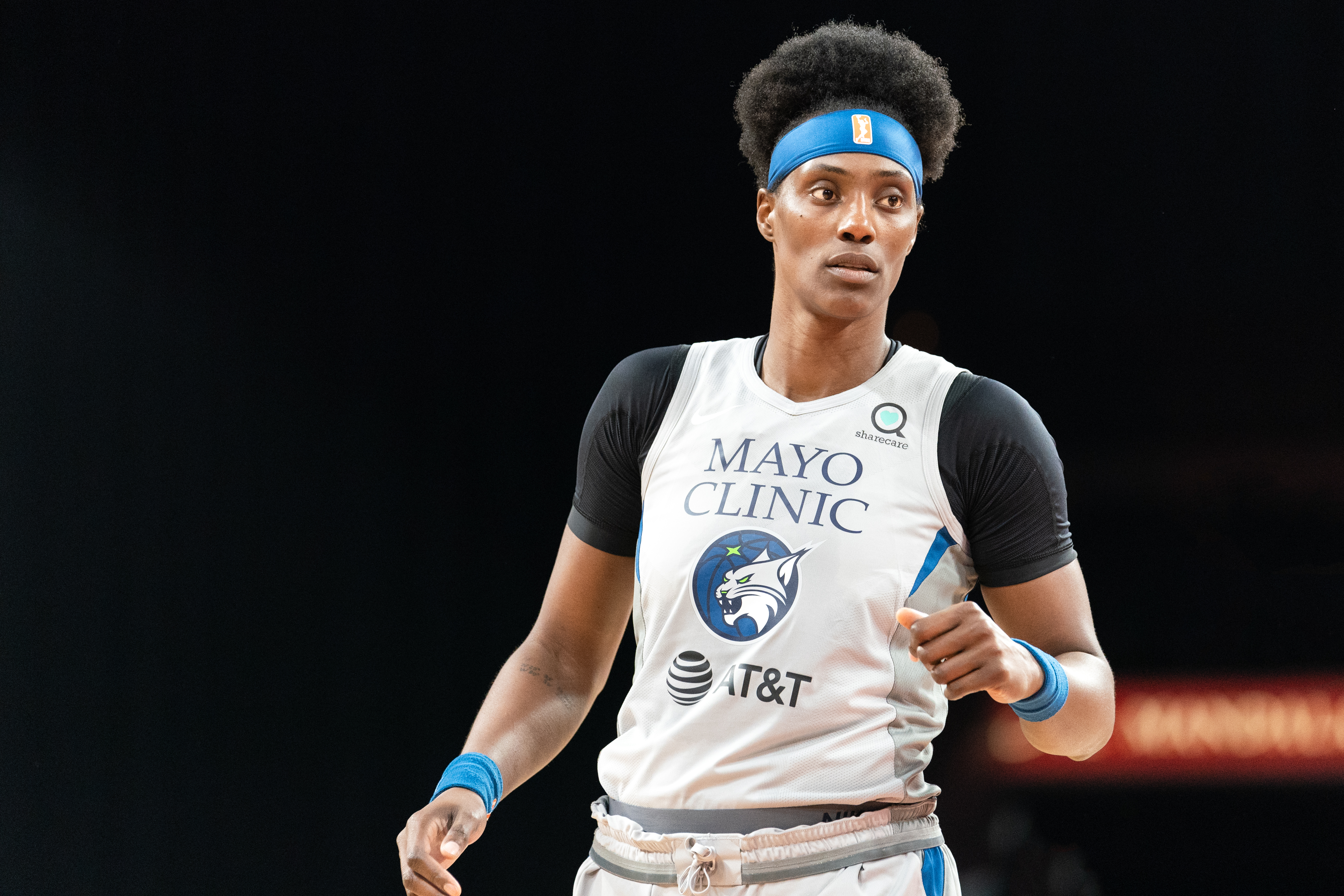
Sylvia Fowles is one of eight players to dunk during a WNBA game.

Dunking is much less common in women's basketball than in men's play. Dunking is slightly more common during practice sessions, but many coaches advise against it in competitive play because of the risks of injury or failing to score.

In 1978, Cardie Hicks became the first American woman known to dunk in a professional game during a game in the Netherlands.

In 1984, Georgeann Wells, a 6'7" (201 cm) junior playing for West Virginia University, became the first woman to score a slam dunk in women's collegiate play, in a game against the University of Charleston on 21 December. On December 4, 1994, Charlotte Smith, then a member of the UNC Tar Heels women's basketball team, became the second collegiate women's player ever to dunk.

As of 2024, at least 37 dunks have been scored by 8 different WNBA players. The first and second were scored by Lisa Leslie of the Los Angeles Sparks, on 30 July 2002 (against the Miami Sol), and 9 July 2005. Other WNBA dunks have been scored by Michelle Snow (first during an All-Star game), Candace Parker (twice), Sylvia Fowles, Brittney Griner, Jonquel Jones, Liz Cambage, and Awak Kuier.

The record for the most WNBA dunks belongs to Brittney Griner, with 25 career dunks as of 2024. Griner was also the first player to dunk twice in one game (27 May 2013, her WNBA debut) and the first to dunk in a playoff game (25 August 2014). Griner was also prolific in high school and college: as a high school senior, she dunked 52 times in 32 games and set a single-game record of seven dunks. As a standout at Baylor University, Griner became the seventh player to dunk during a women's college basketball game and the second woman to dunk twice in a single college game.

At the 2012 London Olympics, Liz Cambage of the Australian Opals became the first woman to dunk in the Olympics, scoring against Russia.

=== Women in dunk contests ===
In 2004, as a high school senior, Candace Parker was invited to participate in the McDonald's All-American Game and accompanying festivities where she competed in and won the slam dunk contest. In subsequent years other women have entered the contest; though Kelley Cain, Krystal Thomas, and Maya Moore were denied entry into the same contest in 2007. Brittney Griner intended to participate in the 2009 McDonald's Dunk Contest but was unable to attend the event due to the attendance policy of her high school. Breanna Stewart, at 6'3" (191 cm), Alexis Prince (6'2"; 188 cm), and Brittney Sykes (5'9"; 175 cm) competed in the 2012 contest; Prince and Sykes failed to complete their dunks, while Stewart landed two in the first round but missed her second two attempts in the final round.

== Use as a phrase ==
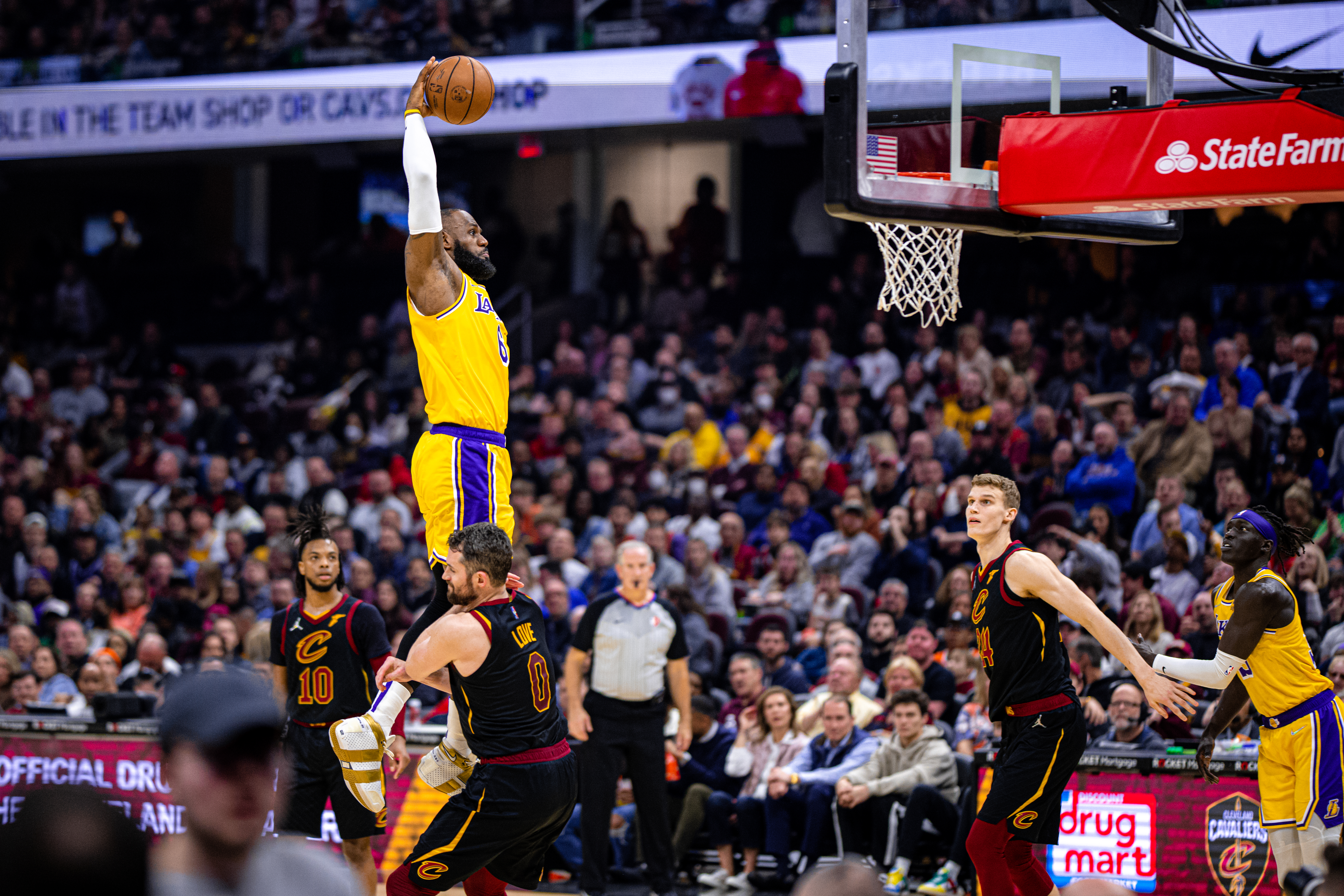
LeBron James posterizing Kevin Love

One of many sports idioms, the phrase "slam dunk" is often used outside of basketball to refer colloquially to something that has a certain outcome or guaranteed success (a "sure thing"). This is related to the high probability of success for a slam dunk versus other types of shots. Additionally, to "be dunked on" or to get "posterized" is sometimes popularly used to indicate that a person has been easily embarrassed by another, in reference to the embarrassment associated with unsuccessfully trying to prevent an opponent from making a dunk. This ascension to popular usage is reminiscent of, for example, the way that the baseball-inspired phrases "step up to the plate" and "he hit it out of the park," or American football-inspired phrases such as "victory formation" or "hail Mary" have entered popular North American vernacular.

== See also ==
- List of sports idioms
- Slam Dunk Contest
