= Dunk of Death =

Basketball play in 2000

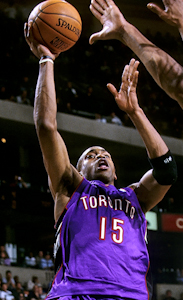
Vince Carter in 2000

The "Dunk of Death" ("le dunk de la mort" in French) refers to a slam dunk by American basketball player Vince Carter during the 2000 Summer Olympics. After a steal, the 6 ft 6 in (1.98 m) Carter leapt over 7 ft 2 in (2.18 m) French player Frédéric Weis. The dunk is widely considered one of the greatest and most famous of all time.

== Background ==
Vince Carter, then a 23-year-old in his second NBA season, was originally passed over the final roster spot on the 2000 United States men's Olympic basketball team in favor of Ray Allen. A month later and seven months before the 2000 Summer Olympics, Carter won the 2000 NBA Slam Dunk contest in what ESPN called one of the most explosive performances in the contest's history. Carter was named to the team in March 2000 as an injury replacement for Tom Gugliotta.

Analysts and players considered the 2000 Summer Olympics as the first in the post-Dream Team era where the international competition was more serious.

== Dunk ==
With 16 minutes remaining and the U.S. ahead by 15 points in its game against France on September 25, 2000, Gary Payton missed a contested lay up. French player Yann Bonato grabbed the rebound, but Carter stole the outlet pass. He took two dribbles, then the 6 ft 6 in (1.98 m) American, leapt over 7 ft 2 in (2.18 m) French center Frédéric Weis and posterized him while slamming the ball into the basket.

A timeout was called shortly after, and Weis was replaced when play resumed. After the game, Weis told reporters that "Everyone will know my face now or my jersey number, at least. It's going to be on a poster, for sure."

== Legacy ==
The U.S. won the game 106–94 and the gold medal in the tournament.

The dunk is widely considered one of the greatest and most famous of all time.

Weis, who was drafted by the New York Knicks in the first round of the 1999 NBA draft, never played in the NBA after an injury-plagued basketball career. On the 15th anniversary of the dunk, Weis said that Carter "deserves to make history. Sadly for me, I was on the video, too. I learned people can fly."
