= Posterized =

Basketball slang

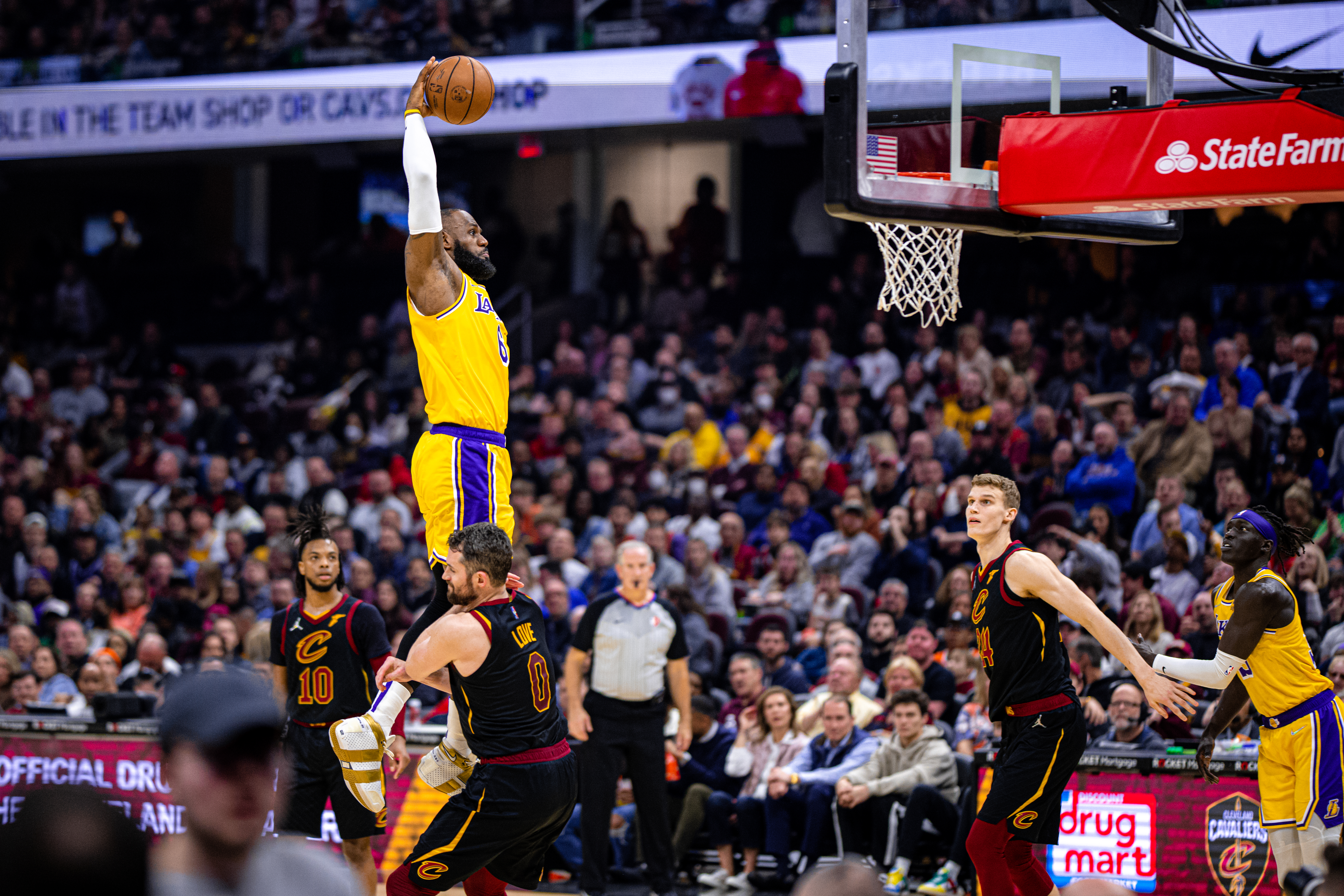
LeBron James of the Los Angeles Lakers posterizes former teammate Kevin Love in a game against the Cleveland Cavaliers on March 21, 2022.

Posterized is North American slang, derived from an action in the game of basketball in which the offensive player performs a slam dunk over a defending player, in a play that is spectacular and athletic enough to warrant reproduction in a printed poster. The term was originated from Julius Erving, whose high-flying style of play inspired the term. Posterized is also used infrequently to describe similar events in other sports, and it has made its way into business writing.

One of the most famous examples of a player being "posterized" occurred during the 2000 Summer Olympics. 6-foot-6 Vince Carter, playing for Team USA, dunked over 7-foot-2 Frédéric Weis of France. The play was dubbed the "Dunk of Death".
