= Vince Carter =

American basketball player (born 1977)

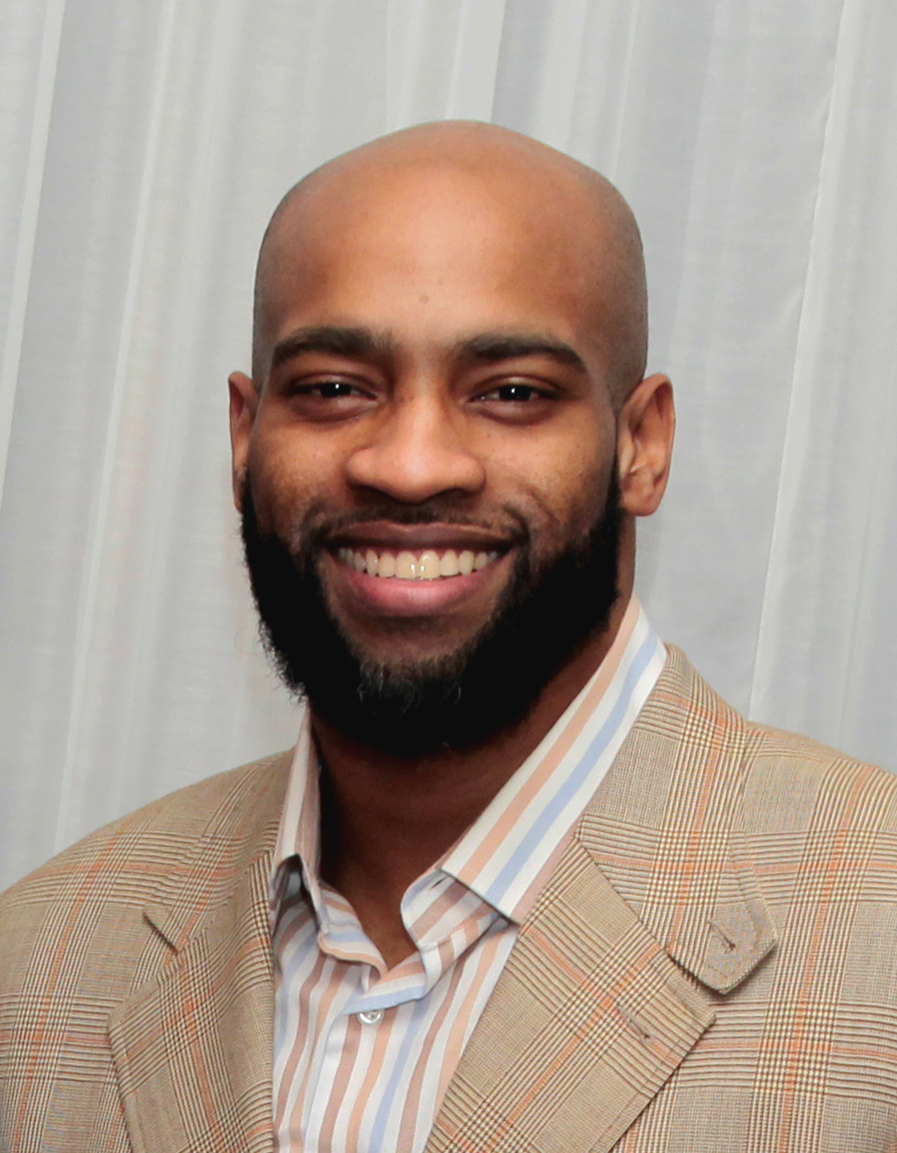
- Carter in 2013

Personal information
- Born: January 26, 1977 (age 49) Daytona Beach, Florida, U.S.
- Listed height: 6 ft 6 in (1.98 m)
- Listed weight: 220 lb (100 kg)

Career information
- High school: Mainland (Daytona Beach, Florida)
- College: North Carolina (1995–1998)
- NBA draft: 1998: 1st round, 5th overall pick
- Drafted by: Golden State Warriors
- Playing career: 1998–2020
- Position: Shooting guard / small forward
- Number: 15, 25

Career history
- 1998–2004: Toronto Raptors
- 2004–2009: New Jersey Nets
- 2009–2010: Orlando Magic
- 2010–2011: Phoenix Suns
- 2011–2014: Dallas Mavericks
- 2014–2017: Memphis Grizzlies
- 2017–2018: Sacramento Kings
- 2018–2020: Atlanta Hawks

Career highlights
- 8× NBA All-Star (2000–2007); All-NBA Second Team (2001); All-NBA Third Team (2000); NBA Rookie of the Year (1999); NBA All-Rookie First Team (1999); NBA Slam Dunk Contest champion (2000); No. 15 retired by Brooklyn Nets; No. 15 retired by Toronto Raptors; Consensus second-team All-American (1998); First-team All-ACC (1998); Third-team All-ACC (1997); No. 15 honored by North Carolina Tar Heels; First-team Parade All-American (1995); McDonald's All-American (1995); Florida Mr. Basketball (1995)

Career statistics
- Points: 25,728 (16.7 ppg)
- Rebounds: 6,606 (4.3 rpg)
- Assists: 4,714 (3.1 apg)
- Stats at NBA.com
- Stats at Basketball Reference
- Basketball Hall of Fame
Medals
Men's basketball
Representing the United States
Olympic Games
Gold medal – first place	2000 Sydney	Team competition
FIBA Americas Championship
Gold medal – first place	2003 San Juan	Team competition

Vincent Lamar Carter Jr. (born January 26, 1977) is an American former professional basketball player who played for 22 seasons in the National Basketball Association (NBA). He primarily played the shooting guard and small forward positions, and was known for his high flying dunks, scoring ability, and athleticism. An eight-time All-Star and a two-time All-NBA Team selection, he played 22 seasons in the NBA, the second longest after LeBron James for the most seasons played in league history. He is also the only player to have played in the NBA in four different decades (1990s, 2000s, 2010s, 2020s). In 2024, Carter was inducted into the Naismith Memorial Basketball Hall of Fame.

Carter entertained crowds with his leaping ability and slam dunks, earning him nicknames such as "Vinsanity", "Air Canada" (a play on the Canadian airline of the same name), and "Half Man, Half Amazing". (Note: Referenced in lyric containing this phrase in "It Ain't Hard to Tell" and "Nas Is Like", songs by rapper Nas.) He has been ranked as the greatest dunker of all time by numerous players, journalists, and by the NBA. His Dunk of Death against France during the 2000 Summer Olympics is considered one of the most famous of all time. In addition to his dunking prowess, Carter was a prolific three-point shooter, making the eleventh most three-point field goals in league history.

A high school McDonald's All-American, Carter played college basketball for three years with the North Carolina Tar Heels and twice advanced to the Final Four of the NCAA Tournament. He was selected with the fifth overall pick in the 1998 NBA draft by the Golden State Warriors, who traded him to the Toronto Raptors. Carter emerged as a global star in Toronto, winning the 1999 NBA Rookie of the Year Award and the Slam Dunk Contest at the 2000 NBA All-Star Weekend. He represented the United States in the 2000 Summer Olympics, where he led the team in scoring and captured a gold medal. In December 2004, Carter was traded to the New Jersey Nets, where he continued his offensive success. He also played for the Orlando Magic, Phoenix Suns, Dallas Mavericks, Memphis Grizzlies, Sacramento Kings, and Atlanta Hawks. He received the Twyman–Stokes Teammate of the Year Award in 2016. Off the court, Carter established the Embassy of Hope Foundation, helping children and their families in Florida, New Jersey and Ontario. He was recognized in 2000 as Child Advocate of the Year by the Children's Home Society, and received the Florida Governor's Points of Light award in 2007 for his philanthropy in his home state. Carter was inducted into the Florida Sports Hall of Fame in 2023.

== Early life ==
Born in Daytona Beach, Florida, Carter is the son of Michelle and Vincent Carter Sr. His parents divorced when he was seven. His mother remarried several times.

Carter attended Mainland High School in Daytona Beach. He played football as a quarterback until a broken wrist in his freshman year forced him to switch to volleyball. In volleyball, he was named the Volusia County Player of the Year as a junior and averaged 24 kills per match; for comparison, none of his teammates averaged more than one. He was also offered a saxophone scholarship to attend Bethune–Cookman University in Daytona Beach.

He led Mainland's basketball team to its first Class 6A state title in 56 years, and was a 1995 McDonald's All-American. On January 31, 2012, he was designated one of the 35 greatest McDonald's All-Americans. In his senior year he averaged 22 points, 11.4 rebounds, 4.5 assists and 3.5 blocks per game. Carter's career totals at Mainland are 2,299 points, 1,042 rebounds, 356 assists and 178 steals. He was contacted by 77 NCAA Division I schools but ultimately chose North Carolina over Florida.

== College ==
Carter enrolled at the University of North Carolina at Chapel Hill in 1995. He is a member of the Omega Psi Phi fraternity.

He played three seasons of college basketball for the North Carolina Tar Heels under Dean Smith and later Bill Guthridge. During the 1997–98 season, he was a member of new coach Guthridge's "Six Starters" system that also featured Antawn Jamison, Shammond Williams, Ed Cota, Ademola Okulaja, and Makhtar N'Diaye. During his sophomore and junior seasons, Carter helped North Carolina to consecutive ACC men's basketball tournament titles and Final Four appearances. He finished the 1997–98 season with a 15.6 points per game average and was named second-team All-American, First-Team All-ACC, and to the fan's guide third-annual Coaches ACC All-Defensive Team. In May 1998 after his junior year, Carter declared for the 1998 NBA draft, following his classmate Jamison, who had declared earlier that spring.

During his NBA career, Carter continued his coursework at North Carolina, and in August 2000, he graduated with a degree in Afro-American studies, squeezing in attendance at May 2001 graduation ceremonies at North Carolina before leaving to make a Raptors' playoff game in Philadelphia.

== Professional career ==
=== Toronto Raptors (1998–2004) ===
Carter was initially drafted by the Golden State Warriors with the fifth overall pick in the 1998 NBA draft. He was then immediately traded to the Toronto Raptors for the fourth overall pick, Antawn Jamison on draft night. The Raptors had struggled in their first three years as a franchise. Carter was instrumental in leading the Raptors to their first-ever playoff appearance in 2000 before going on to lead them to a 47-win season and their first-ever playoff series win in 2001, advancing them to the Eastern Conference Semifinals.

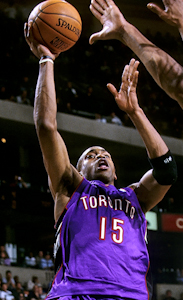
Carter with the Raptors in November 2000

Due to the 1998–99 NBA lockout, Carter did not begin playing in the NBA until February 1999. Carter quickly became a fan favorite with a soaring offensive game that earned him the nickname "Air Canada". He won the NBA Rookie of the Year Award after averaging 18.3 points and throwing down countless highlight-reel dunks. Carter ascended to full-fledged stardom in his second season—he averaged 25.7 points per game (fourth-highest in the league) and lifted Toronto to its first playoff appearance in franchise history. He subsequently earned his first NBA All-Star selection and was named to the All-NBA Third Team. During the 2000 NBA All-Star Weekend, Carter showcased arguably the most memorable Slam Dunk Contest event in its history. He won the contest by performing an array of dunks including a 360° windmill, a between-the-legs bounce dunk, and an "elbow in the rim" dunk (also known as a "cookie jar" dunk or the "honey dip"). Carter and his second cousin once removed, Tracy McGrady, formed a formidable one-two punch as teammates in Toronto between 1998 and 2000. However, McGrady left in free agency to the Orlando Magic in August 2000, leaving Carter as the Raptors' franchise player.

In 2000–01, his third season, Carter averaged a career-high 27.6 points per game, made the All-NBA Second Team, and was voted in as a starter for the 2001 NBA All-Star Game. The Raptors finished the regular season with a then franchise-record 47 wins. In the playoffs, the Raptors beat the New York Knicks 3–2 in the first round and advanced to the Eastern Conference Semifinals to face off against the Philadelphia 76ers. Carter and 76ers star Allen Iverson both dominated in a seven-game series that see-sawed back and forth. Carter scored 50 points in Game 3 and set an NBA playoff record for most three-point field goals made in one game. In Game 7, Carter missed a potential game-winning shot with 2.0 seconds remaining. Iverson said of the series in July 2011: "It was incredible. (Carter) had great games at home and I had some great games at home, but both of us were just trying to put our teams on our back and win basketball games. It is great just having those memories and being a part of something like that."

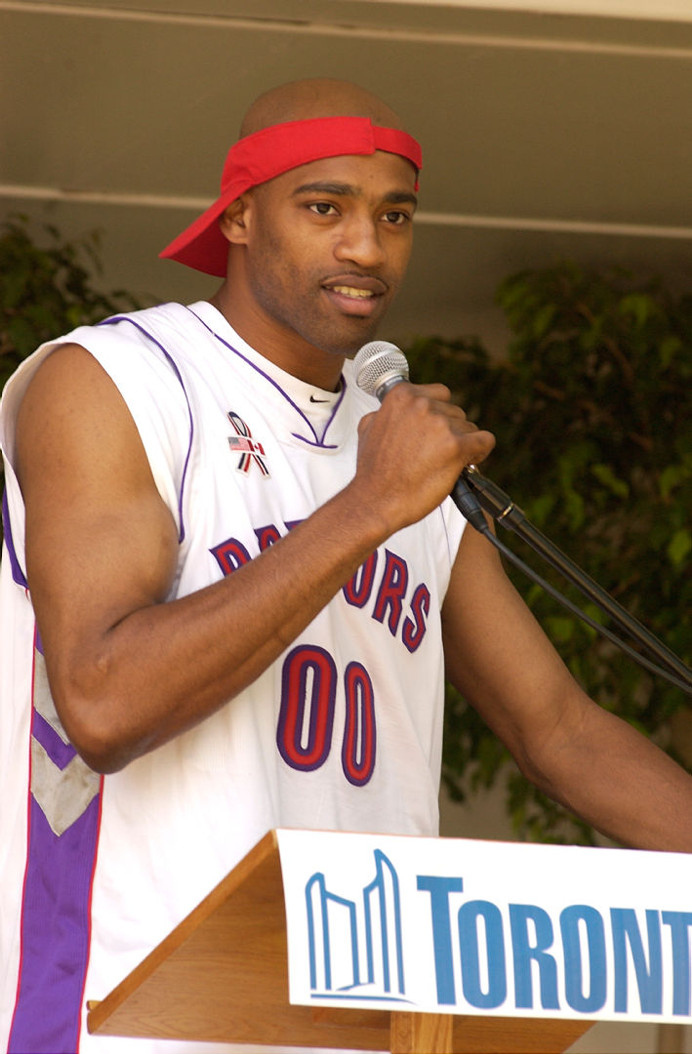
Carter in 2003

In August 2001, Carter signed a six-year contract extension worth as much as $94 million. Carter missed the final 22 games of the 2001–02 regular season due to injury. He started in 60 games and averaged 24.7 points per game. On December 7, 2001, Carter recorded 42 points, 15 rebounds, 6 assists and 5 steals against the Denver Nuggets. He joined Charles Barkley (1988) as just the second player ever to finish a game with 40 points, 15 rebounds, five steals and five assists, dating back to the 1973–74 season, when the league began officially tracking steals. He was voted into the 2002 NBA All-Star Game, but he could not participate due to injury. Without Carter during the playoffs, the Raptors were defeated in five games by the Detroit Pistons in the first round.

Following off-season surgery, Carter only managed to play 43 games during the 2002–03 season. In February 2003, Carter gave up his starting spot in the 2003 NBA All-Star Game to Michael Jordan to allow Jordan to make his final start as an All-Star. Carter played in 73 games during the 2003–04 season, but the Raptors fell three games short of making the playoffs.

==== Trade to the Nets ====
During the 2004 off-season, general manager Glen Grunwald and the entire coaching staff were fired. Following trade rumours all season long, on December 17, 2004, new general manager Rob Babcock traded Carter to the New Jersey Nets for Alonzo Mourning, Aaron Williams, Eric Williams and two first-round draft picks (a 2005 pick which was used by Toronto to select Joey Graham 16th overall; and a 2006 pick which was traded by Toronto in a package with Jalen Rose and an undisclosed amount of cash to the New York Knicks for Antonio Davis (the Knicks used the pick to select Renaldo Balkman 20th overall).

In his first game back in Toronto, on April 15, 2005, Carter was heavily booed and jeered by Raptors fans. Carter would finish with 39 points in a 101–90 New Jersey victory. Carter continued to receive similar treatment for years to come in the town that once embraced him. Despite this, he thrived on many occasions in Toronto as a Net. On January 8, 2006, after a missed free throw by the Raptors, Carter hit a long three pointer at the other end with 0.1 seconds left to seal a 105–104 win to shock the Toronto crowd. Afterwards Carter, who finished with 42 points, referred to it among his greatest shots ever saying "That's definitely number one. The atmosphere, the emotion, the hostility in the arena, it was a fun game." On November 21, 2008, Carter's late game heroics sent the game into overtime where he would hit another game-winner doing so on an inbounds alley-oop dunk with 1.5 seconds left in a 129–127 victory. Carter scored 39 points and regarding the continued booing he insisted he held no grudges to the fans, saying "I know, deep down, that's just sports, that's the way it goes. I root for my team and I'm a terrible fan."

In November 2011, Carter, along with Tracy McGrady and Charles Oakley, addressed the Toronto audience in an interview on Off the Record with Michael Landsberg. When asked about being booed in Toronto, Carter said, "They watched myself and Tracy grow up. And when we left they still got to see (us) flourish and become (who we are). For me, I looked at it as, a young child growing up into a grown man and moving on. And I get it. Leaving, hurt a lot of people. It hurt me because I tell you what... I accomplished a lot, I learned a lot, I became the person and player of who I am today because of that experience, through the coaches, players, and everything else. I get it... but regardless I still love the city. I have friends there and my heart is still there because that's where it all started." Later in the interview, when asked about any words to the Toronto fans, Carter said, "I appreciate the fans and whether you cheer for me, boo me, or hate me, I still love you. Toronto's one of the best kept secrets... puts one of the best products on the floor and one of the top places to play in."

On November 6, 2012, in an interview with TSN Radio 1050, Carter reiterated his love for the city and his appreciation for the Toronto Raptors organization. The next day, Sam Mitchell and Rob Babcock revealed on Sportsnet 590, The Fan that the night before Carter was traded to New Jersey, Carter phoned Mitchell to express his desire to stay in Toronto. However, Babcock said it was too late and the trade had already been verbally agreed upon. Looking back on it, Mitchell feels he should have personally contacted the MLSE chairman, Larry Tanenbaum, but was reluctant because he did not want to break the chain of command.

Raptors general manager Masai Ujiri referred to Carter in April 2014 as "one of the symbols of the Toronto Raptors." To this day, Carter remains as one of the Raptors' elite scorers in franchise history having amassed 9,420 points and is Toronto's all-time leader in points per game, box plus/minus and player efficiency rating during his 6 1/2-year run in Toronto.

On November 19, 2014, nearly a decade after the trade, as a part of the Raptors' 20th anniversary celebration, the team paid tribute to Carter with a video montage during the first quarter of the Raptors–Grizzlies game. Leading up to the game, questions were raised about how Raptors fans would receive the planned video tribute. As the sellout crowd watched the video tribute featuring highlights of Carter's high-flying Raptors days, what began as the usual booing turned into an overwhelmingly positive standing ovation. An emotional Carter used his warm-up shirt to wipe tears running down his face as he pointed to his heart and waved to the fans in appreciation. He later stated, "It was a great feeling, I couldn't write it any better."

=== New Jersey Nets (2004–2009) ===
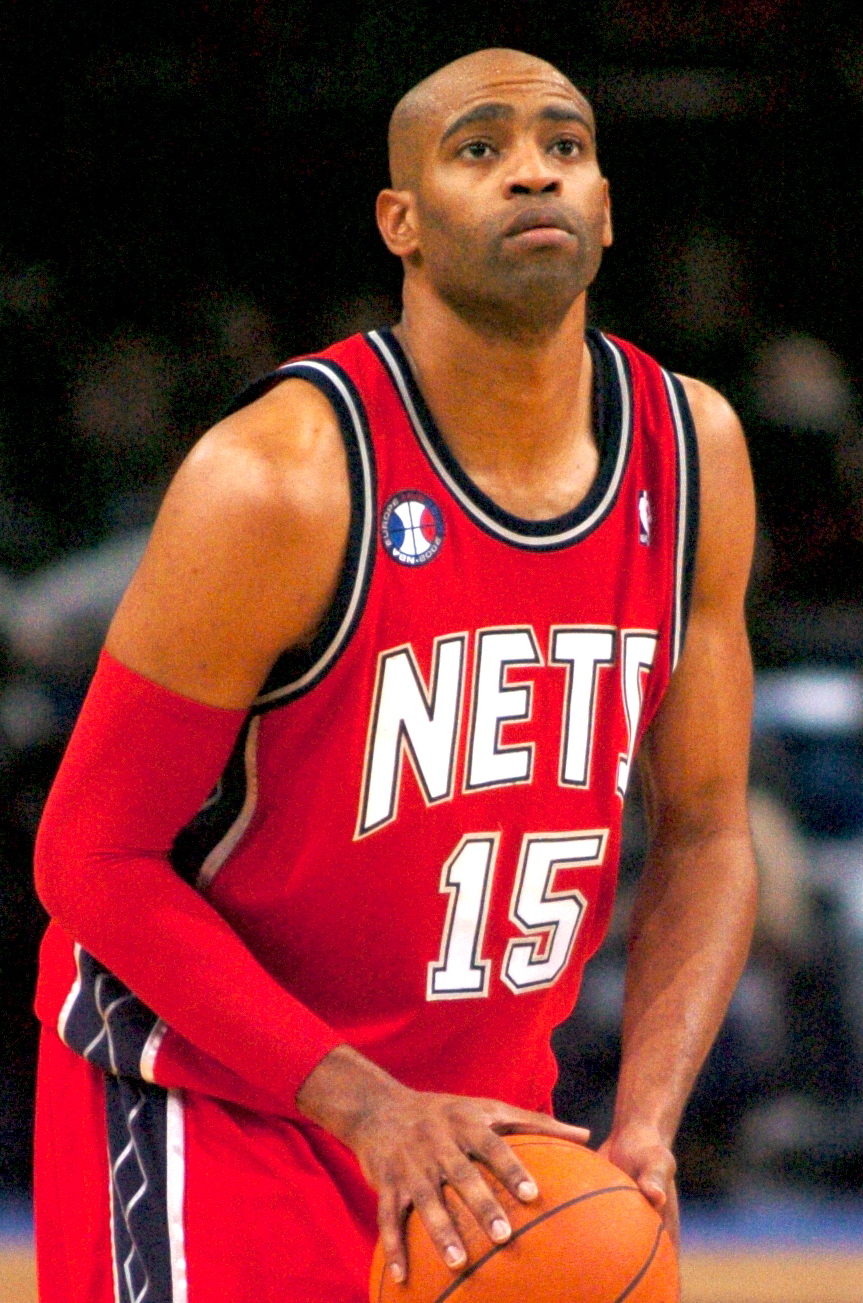
Carter, pictured here in 2008, spent five seasons with the Nets

Carter was acquired by the New Jersey Nets on December 17, 2004, playing five seasons for them before departing in June 2009. Carter produced some of his highest numbers with the Nets, surpassing his 23.4 points per game with the Raptors to average 23.6 points per game over his tenure in New Jersey. He missed just 11 games in his four full seasons and helped lead the Nets to three straight playoff runs between 2005 and 2007.

Carter joined a Nets team with Jason Kidd and Richard Jefferson as the leading players. However, the trio never got to play together at full strength during the 2004–05 season. Carter and Kidd carried a shallow roster on a 15–4 run to end the season to make the playoffs.

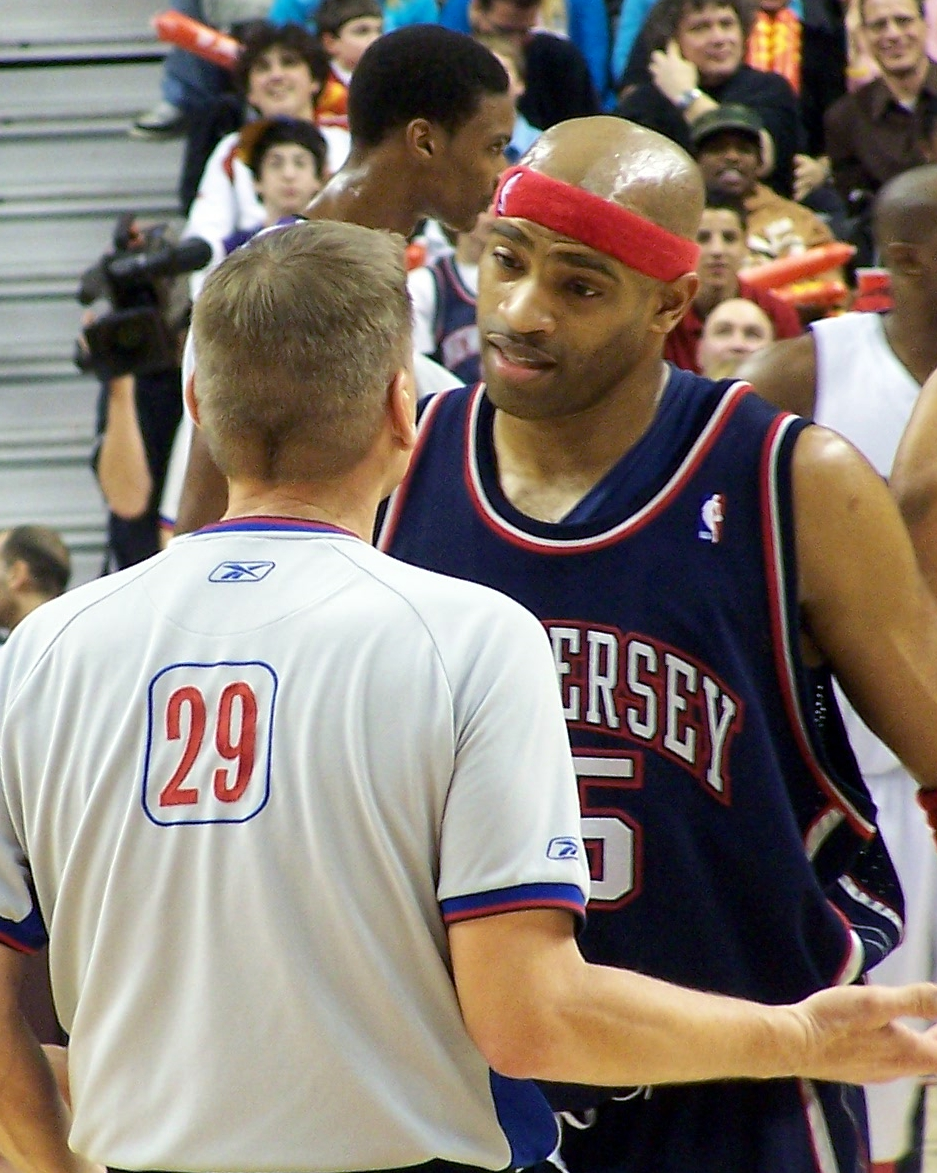
Carter talks with a referee during a game with the Nets, January 2006

In the 2005–06 season, the Carter-Kidd duo co-led the Nets to 49 wins, an Atlantic Division title, and the No. 3 seed in the playoffs. Carter helped lead the Nets to the second round of the playoffs before losing to the eventual NBA champions Miami Heat in five games. Carter averaged 29.6 points, 7.0 rebounds and 5.3 assists in 11 playoff games. Carter was named an Eastern Conference All-Star in 2006. On November 7, 2005, Carter threw down a very memorable dunk against the Miami Heat, over defensive stalwart, Alonzo Mourning. On December 23, 2005, Carter set an NBA record for the most free throws made in a quarter (4th quarter) with 16 against Miami. He tied his career-high of 51 points in the same game.

In the 2006–07 season, Carter was named as a reserve to the 2007 NBA All-Star Game, marking his eighth All-Star appearance. In a 120–114 overtime win over the Washington Wizards on April 7, 2007, Carter and Kidd became the first teammates in over 18 years to record triple-doubles in the same game since the Chicago Bulls' Michael Jordan and Scottie Pippen achieved this feat against the Los Angeles Clippers in 1989. Carter finished with 46 points, a career-high 16 rebounds, and 10 assists. Kidd finished with 10 points, tied a career high with 16 rebounds, and tied a season high with 18 assists. Carter finished the 2006–07 season playing all 82 games, averaging over 25 points with a 21 PER.

In July 2007, Carter re-signed with the Nets to a four-year, $61.8 million contract.

During the 2007–08 season, Kidd was traded to the Dallas Mavericks. Carter was credited for becoming a leader following the All-Star break. He became captain of the Nets, and in 2008–09, he and teammate Devin Harris were the highest-scoring starting backcourt in the league. On November 21, 2008, Carter scored a season-high 39 points, including a game-winning two-handed reverse dunk, as the Nets battled back from an 18-point deficit to defeat the Toronto Raptors 129–127 in overtime at the Air Canada Centre. He hit a 29-foot, game-tying three-pointer to send the game into overtime and then scored the winning basket in the extra period. On February 3, 2009, Carter recorded his fifth career triple-double with 15 points, 12 assists and 10 rebounds in a 99–85 win over the Milwaukee Bucks.

=== Orlando Magic (2009–2010) ===
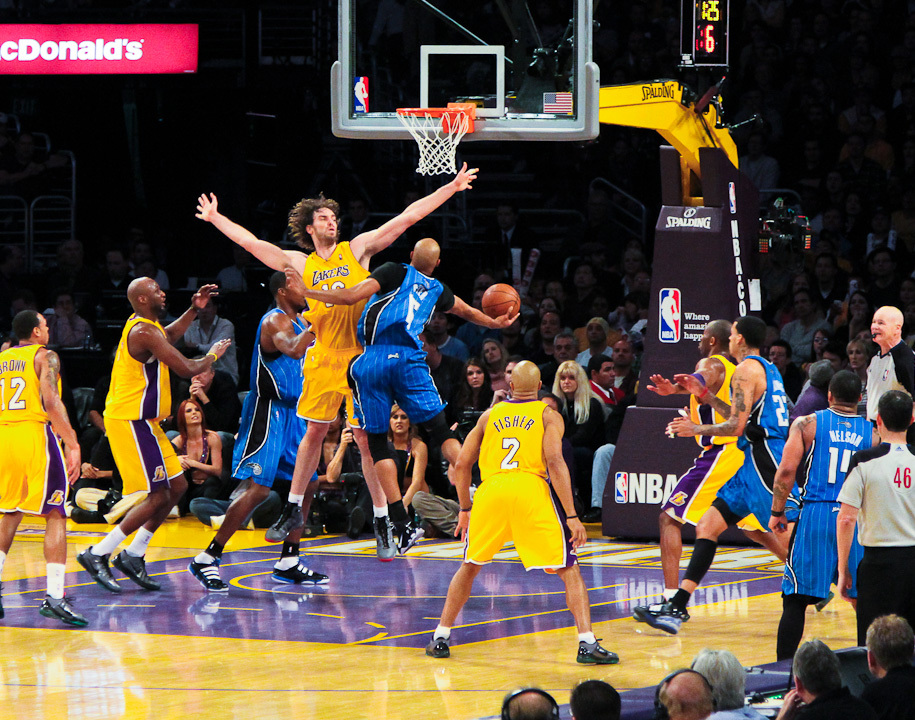
Carter with the Magic in 2010 attempts a layup against Pau Gasol of the Los Angeles Lakers

On June 25, 2009, Carter was traded, along with Ryan Anderson, to the Orlando Magic in exchange for Rafer Alston, Tony Battie and Courtney Lee. Orlando hoped Carter would provide center Dwight Howard with a perimeter scorer who could create his own shot—something the Magic had lacked when they were defeated in the 2009 NBA Finals by the Los Angeles Lakers. On February 8, 2010, Carter had a season-high 48 points, 34 in the second half, when the Magic rallied from a 17-point deficit to defeat the New Orleans Hornets 123–117. Carter helped the Magic reach the Eastern Conference Finals, where they were defeated 4–2 by the Boston Celtics.

=== Phoenix Suns (2010–2011) ===
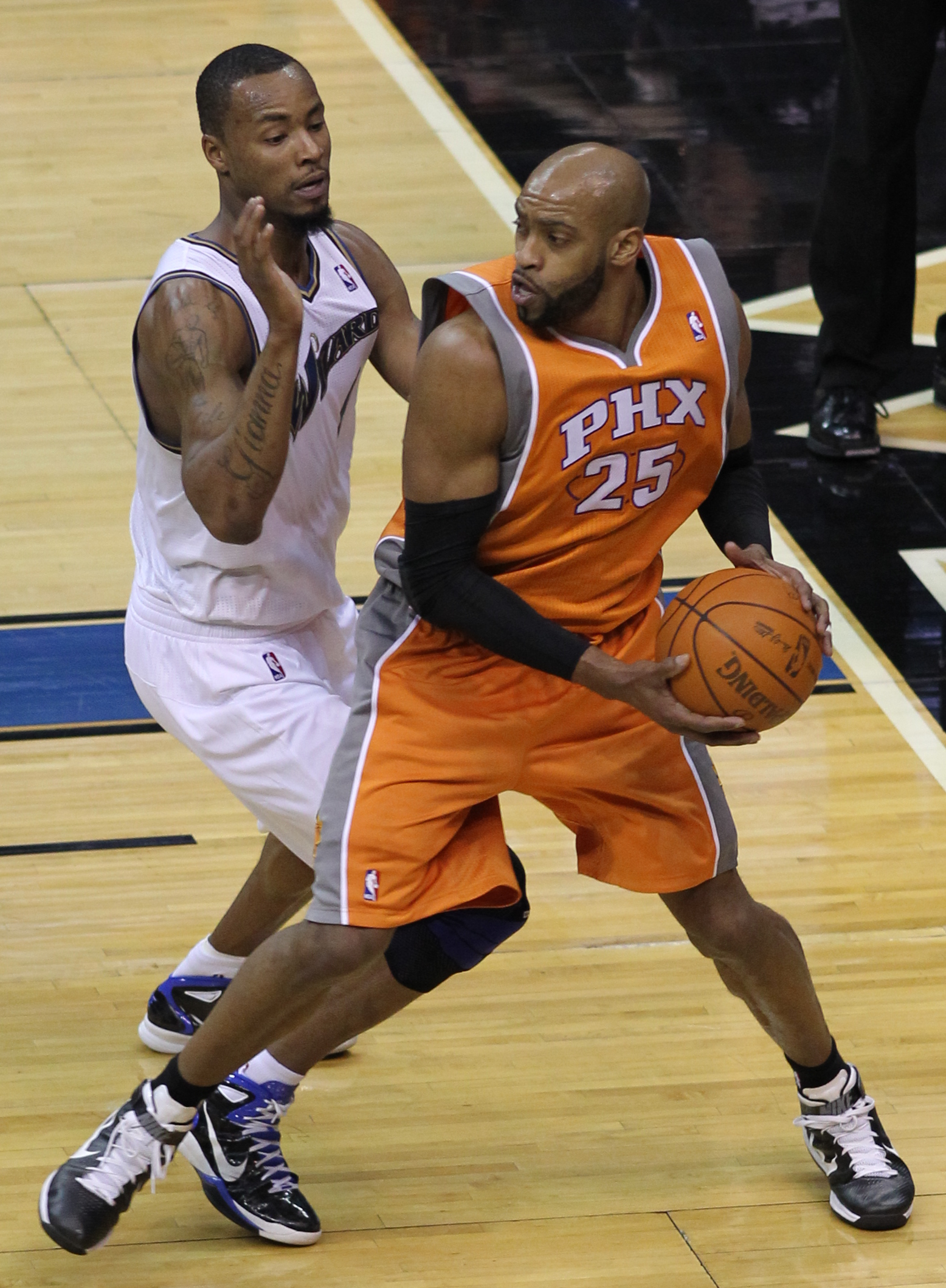
Carter with the ball in 2011

On December 18, 2010, Carter was acquired by the Phoenix Suns along with Marcin Gortat, Mickael Pietrus, and a first-round draft pick in 2011 NBA draft in exchange for Jason Richardson, Hedo Turkoglu, and Earl Clark. On January 17, 2011, Carter recorded 29 points and 12 rebounds in a 129–121 win over the New York Knicks. He reached 20,000 career points during the game, becoming the 37th NBA player to reach that plateau.

On December 9, 2011, following the conclusion of the NBA lockout, Carter was waived by the Suns, meaning the team only had to pay him $4 million of the $18 million he was due for the 2011–12 season. Carter appeared in 51 games with 41 starts, averaging 13.5 points while shooting 42 percent.

=== Dallas Mavericks (2011–2014) ===
On December 12, 2011, Carter signed a three-year contract with the defending NBA champion Dallas Mavericks. This move reunited Carter with former Nets teammate Jason Kidd. On April 20, 2012, against the Golden State Warriors, Carter became the eighth player in NBA history with 1,500 3-pointers when he made one in the closing minutes.

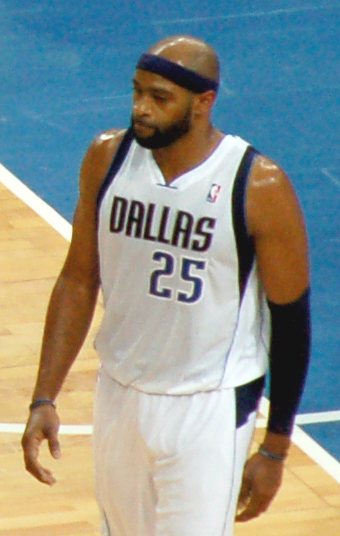
Carter with the Mavericks in October 2012

While known early on in his career for his circus dunks, Carter became known for his 3-point shooting with the Mavericks. On February 13, 2013, in a 123–100 win over the Sacramento Kings, Carter scored 26 points to pass Larry Bird on the NBA's career scoring list, moving him into 29th place. Carter turned aside a Sacramento rally in the third quarter by going 5 of 7 from long range and scoring 17 of Dallas' last 21 points in the period. He ended the night with 21,796 career points for 29th on the all-time list, five ahead of Bird. He also became the 11th NBA player with at least 1,600 3-pointers. He finished the season ranked 27th on the NBA's all-time scoring list with 22,223 career points. His 162 3-pointers tied his career high for 3s made in a season (162-of-397, .408, with Toronto in 2000–01). Over the course of the season, he advanced from 17th place to 11th place on the NBA's all-time 3-point field goals made list (passing Nick Van Exel, Tim Hardaway, Eddie Jones, Glen Rice, Jason Richardson and Kobe Bryant), finishing the year with 1,663 career 3-pointers.

Prior to the 2013–14 season, Carter established himself as the Mavericks' sixth man, after the departure of Jason Terry. He averaged just 10.5 points and shot 37.6% from the field during the first 22 games of the season due to increased responsibilities and pressure to be the team's lone scoring punch off of the bench. He saw his numbers improve in December, averaging 12.5 points and shooting 44.3% from the field during an 18-game stretch. On March 16, 2014, against the Oklahoma City Thunder, Carter raised his career total to 23,010 points, becoming the 27th NBA player to pass the 23,000-point mark with a 3-pointer with 2:17 left in the third quarter. In Game 3 of the Mavericks' first-round playoff series against the San Antonio Spurs, Carter drilled the game-winning 3-pointer with no time remaining on the clock to give the eighth-seeded Mavericks a 109–108 win and a 2–1 series edge over the top-seeded Spurs. The Mavericks went on to lose the series in seven games.

=== Memphis Grizzlies (2014–2017) ===
==== 2014–15 season ====
On July 12, 2014, Carter signed a multi-year deal with the Memphis Grizzlies. On November 13, 2014, he made a game winning alley-oop assist from the sideline to teammate Courtney Lee at the buzzer to win the game 111–110 over the Sacramento Kings. On December 17, 2014, Carter scored a season-high 18 points in a 117–116 triple overtime win over the San Antonio Spurs. Carter moved into 25th in all-time NBA scoring during the game, passing Robert Parish (23,334).

==== 2015–16 season ====
Carter appeared in just one of the Grizzlies' first 12 games of the 2015–16 season. On February 24, 2016, with nine points scored against the Los Angeles Lakers, Carter passed Charles Barkley (23,757) for 24th in career points scored. Two days later, he scored a season-high 19 points in a 112–95 win over the Lakers. For the latter half of April and the whole first round playoff series against the Spurs, Carter was inserted in the starting lineup and played well. In Game 1 against the Spurs, Carter scored a team-high 16 points in a 106–74 loss. The Grizzlies went on to lose the series in four games. After finishing second behind Tim Duncan in the 2014–15 season, Carter was awarded with the Twyman–Stokes Teammate of the Year Award for the 2015–16 season. The award recognizes the player deemed the best teammate based on selfless play, on- and off-court leadership as a mentor and role model to other NBA players, and commitment and dedication to team.

==== 2016–17 season ====
On November 1, 2016, Carter played in his 1,278th NBA game, tying him with A.C. Green for 25th on the NBA's career list. He also became the 24th player in NBA history to surpass 24,000 career points. On November 8, he scored 20 points against the Denver Nuggets and became the oldest player in the NBA to post a 20-point game since Michael Jordan scored 25 for the Washington Wizards in April 2003, at age 40. It was also Carter's first 20-point game since April 30, 2014. On November 12, Carter made seven field goals against the Milwaukee Bucks to pass Gary Payton (8,708) for 21st in NBA history. Carter also passed Charles Oakley for 24th on the NBA's career games played list with 1,283. On November 14, in a win over the Utah Jazz, Carter had his second 20-point game of the season, joining Michael Jordan and Patrick Ewing as the only players in NBA history to put up 20 points and 5+ rebounds off the bench at the age of 39, with Carter being the oldest at 39 years and 287 days. Carter missed seven games in early December with a right hip flexor strain. On January 11, Carter hit his 1,989th career three-pointer to move ahead of Jason Kidd and into fifth on the all-time list. On February 1, in a game against the Denver Nuggets, Carter hit his 2,000th career three-pointer, making him only the fifth player to ever reach that mark. On February 6 against San Antonio, Carter joined Karl Malone, Dikembe Mutombo, Kareem Abdul-Jabbar and Robert Parish as the only 40-year-old players to record at least four blocks in a game. On February 15, in a game against the New Orleans Pelicans, Carter passed Allen Iverson for 23rd on the NBA all-time scoring list. On March 13, Carter made his first start of the season and made all eight of his shots, including six from beyond the arc, to score a season-high 24 points and lead the Grizzlies past the Milwaukee Bucks 113–93. He became the first 40-year-old in NBA history to hit six triples in one game. At 40 years, 46 days old, Carter also became the oldest player to start an NBA game since Juwan Howard in April 2013. On March 29 against the Indiana Pacers, Carter passed Ray Allen for 22nd on the NBA all-time scoring list. In the Grizzlies' regular-season finale on April 12 against the Dallas Mavericks, Carter played in his 1,347th game and passed Kobe Bryant for 13th in regular-season games played. On April 22, Carter became the first 40-year-old to make three or more 3-pointers in a playoff game during Game 4 of the Grizzlies' first-round series against the San Antonio Spurs.

=== Sacramento Kings (2017–2018) ===
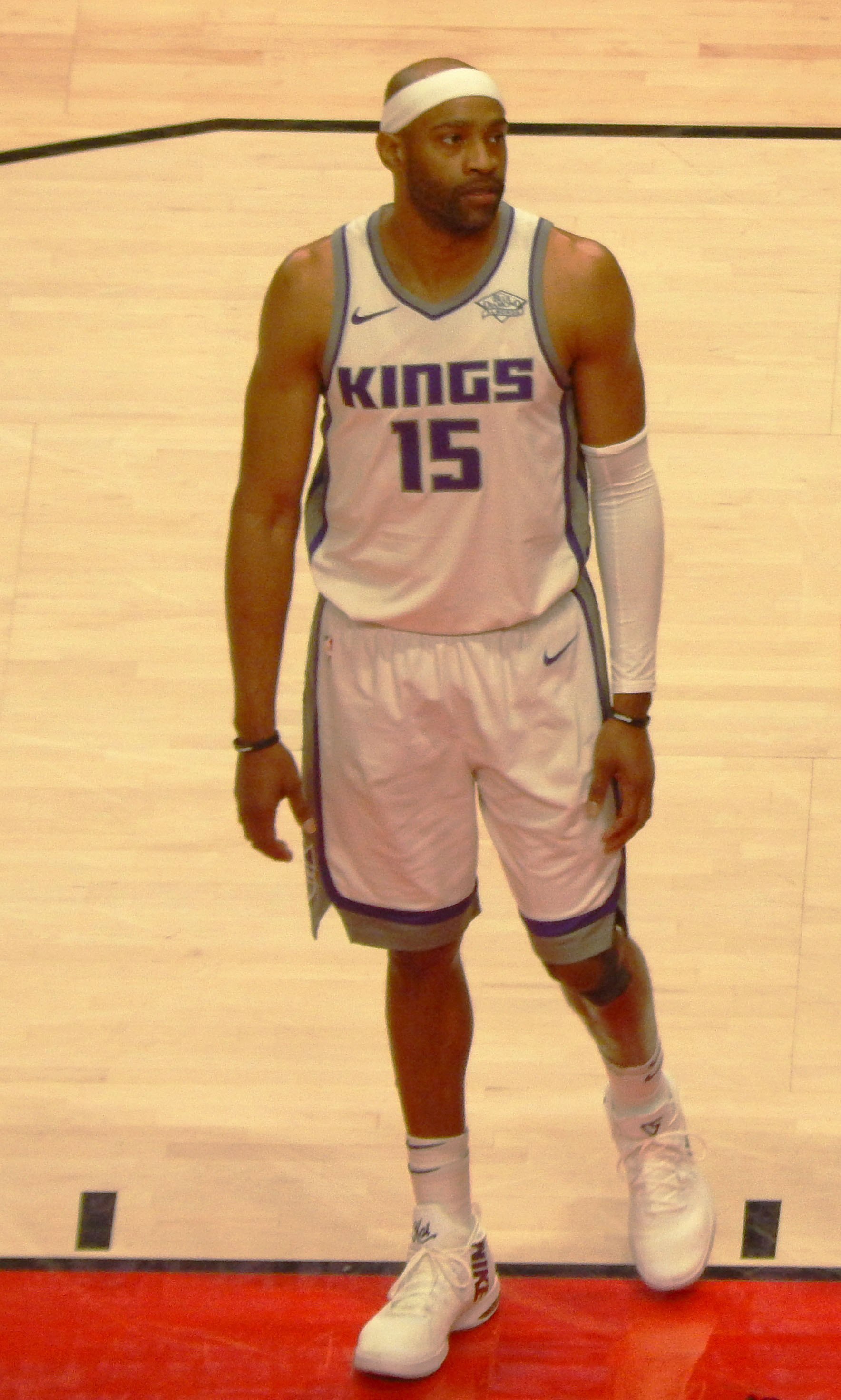
Carter with the Sacramento Kings in 2018

On July 10, 2017, Carter signed a one-year, $8 million contract with the Sacramento Kings. On August 18, 2017, during the Players Voice Awards, Carter was named by the NBA Players Association as the Most Influential Veteran. Carter missed seven games early in the season with a kidney stone. On December 27, 2017, Carter scored a season-high 24 points in a 109–95 win over the Cleveland Cavaliers. It was the first time in NBA history that a 40-plus-year-old reserve scored at least 20 points in a game. He shot 10-of-12 from the field in 30 minutes off the bench, with his 83 percent shooting marking the second highest percentage of his career. On January 28, 2018, against the San Antonio Spurs, Carter and Manu Ginóbili scored 21 and 15 points respectively; it was the first game in NBA history where two players over the age of 40 each scored at least 15 points. On March 19, 2018, in a 106–90 loss to the Detroit Pistons, Carter had seven points to move past Patrick Ewing into 22nd place on the NBA's career scoring list. At the season's end, he was named the recipient of the NBPA's Backbone Award and Most Respected Award, as part of the Players Voice Awards.

=== Atlanta Hawks (2018–2020) ===
==== 2018–19 season ====
On August 24, 2018, Carter signed with the Atlanta Hawks. In his debut for the Hawks on October 17, 2018, Carter started at forward and scored 12 points in a 126–107 loss to the New York Knicks, becoming the second oldest player in NBA history to start a season opener at 41 years and 264 days old. Only Robert Parish (42 years and 65 days old) was an older opening-night NBA starter than Carter. On November 21, he scored 14 points off the bench in a 124–108 loss to the Toronto Raptors, and became the 22nd player in NBA history to reach 25,000 career points. The milestone moment, which happened in the final seconds of the game, was made even more memorable for coming via a slam dunk and also for coming against his original team who joined in congratulating him on the court. On December 29, he scored an equal team-high 21 points in 111–108 win over the Cleveland Cavaliers. It was his first game with 20 points for Atlanta and became the oldest player in history to lead or tie for the team lead in scoring. He also became the oldest player in NBA history to score 20+ points at 41 years and 337 days old, breaking Kareem Abdul-Jabbar's record by 6 days. On February 7, 2019, against the Raptors, Carter passed Jerry West for 21st on the NBA's all-time scoring list. On March 1, 2019, he logged the second-most minutes for the Hawks in a 168–161 quadruple-overtime loss to the Chicago Bulls. At 42, Carter became the oldest player in NBA history to play at least 45 minutes in a game. On March 4, he scored 21 points, all on 3-pointers, in a 114–113 loss to the Miami Heat. He thus surpassed Reggie Miller for 20th on the all-time scoring list, passed Jamal Crawford for sixth on the all-time 3-point field goals made list, became the oldest player to shoot seven 3-pointers, and broke his own record of being the oldest player to score 20+ points in a game at 42 years old. On March 31, against the Milwaukee Bucks, Carter passed Karl Malone for fifth place on the all-time games played list with his 1,477th game.

==== 2019–20 season ====
In June 2019, Carter stated that he was planning to retire at the end of the 2019–20 NBA season. On September 20, 2019, Carter re-signed with the Hawks and played his first game on October 24, 2019, making his 22nd season official. Four of Carter's teammates were born after he was drafted in 1998. On December 10, 2019, he became the fifth player in NBA history to play at least 1,500 games. On January 4, 2020, during a 116–111 win over the Indiana Pacers, Carter became the only player in NBA history to have played in four different decades. On January 22, 2020, Carter moved past Alex English for 19th on the NBA all-time scoring list. On January 31, 2020, Carter moved up to 3rd place in all-time NBA games played with 1,523 passing Dirk Nowitzki in the process. On March 11, 2020, Carter returned to the floor in the final seconds of a game against the New York Knicks, making a three-pointer. That game became Carter's final game; the NBA suspended the season that day due to the COVID-19 pandemic. Carter officially announced his retirement from the NBA on June 25, 2020, at the age of 43.

== National team career ==
Carter played for head coach Kelvin Sampson on the United States men's national under-19 team at the 1995 FIBA Under-19 Basketball World Cup in Athens. He and Samaki Walker tied for the team lead in blocks in the team's eight games.

During the 2000 Summer Olympics in Sydney, Carter led the U.S. in scoring averaging 14.8 points a game. He also performed one of the most memorable dunks of his career when he jumped over 7-foot-2-inch (2.18 m) French center Frédéric Weis. Teammate Jason Kidd said "It was one of the best plays I've ever seen." The French media later dubbed it "le dunk de la mort" ("the Dunk of Death"). The U.S. team went on to win the gold medal that year. Carter admitted he channeled his frustrations in his personal life and Tracy McGrady leaving the Raptors before the Olympics. The dunk is widely considered one of the greatest and most famous of all time.

Carter replaced Kobe Bryant on the USA roster for the 2003 FIBA Americas Tournament while Bryant was undergoing surgeries on his knee and shoulder. He wore Bryant's jersey number 8. Bryant was supposed to take his spot back in time for the 2004 Olympics, but would later withdraw due to allegations of sexual assault. Carter was offered the Olympic spot but chose instead to take time off during the summer to rest and heal, as well as to get married.

== Other pursuits ==
Carter opened a restaurant named for himself in Daytona Beach in 2010. His mother operated the restaurant. They sold it in January 2017 for $4.3 million.

Carter signed a sponsorship deal with Puma prior to his first NBA season, and his first signature shoe, the Puma Vinsanity, was released. However, Carter broke his contract with Puma prematurely, citing the "shoes were hurting his feet" and played out the rest of the 1999–2000 NBA season in various brands. Prior to the 2000 Summer Olympics, Carter signed with Nike as a 'signature athlete' and his first signature Nike Shox shoe, a Nike Shox BB4 PE, debuted and was released publicly in 2000 to coincide with the Olympic games. Nike released five other signature Shox models bearing Carter's initials. During his final season, Nike commemorated Carter's 22-year NBA career by publicly re-releasing his first Nike signature shoe, the Shox BB4.

On September 17, 2020, ESPN announced that Carter had signed a multi-year contract with them, serving as an NBA and college basketball analyst. In July 2023, it was reported that ESPN will not renew Carter's contract during a series of big-name layoffs for the network. On October 24, 2023, Carter was reported to have joined YES Network as a part-time analyst for Brooklyn Nets games. Vince Carter also works as a part-time Hawks TV analyst. Carter was part of a coalition that, along with several private equity executives, his former teammate Tracy McGrady, and Jozy Altidore, purchased a minority stake in the National Football League's Buffalo Bills from the Pegula family in December 2024. Carter joined NBA on TNT in 2024, and NBA on NBC in 2025 as a studio analyst.

In October 2025, Carter joined huupe, the developers of the world's first smart basketball hoop and gaming console, as a strategic advisor. Huupe announced Carter's appointment alongside fellow Basketball Hall of Famer Tracy McGrady, who joined the company as Chief Innovation Officer.

== Awards and achievements ==
Carter is the only player in NBA history to have appeared in a game in four different decades. Carter holds fourth place on the list of the oldest players to compete in the NBA. He is one of six players in NBA history to average at least 20 points, 4 rebounds and 3 assists per game in 10 straight seasons. He is also one of six players in league history to record 24,000 points, 6,000 rebounds, 2,500 assists, 1,000 steals and 1,000 3-point field goals. Carter currently holds the record for the most game-winning 3 point buzzer beaters in NBA history.

On November 2, 2024, Carter's jersey was retired by the Raptors, making him the first Raptors player to have his jersey retired by the franchise. On January 25, 2025, Carter's jersey was retired by the Nets.

- 8× NBA All-Star selection: 2000–2007 (did not play in 2002 due to injury)
- Olympic gold medal: 2000
- 2× All-NBA:
  - Second Team: 2001
  - Third Team: 2000
- NBA Slam Dunk Champion: 2000
- NBA All-Rookie First Team: 1999
- NBA Rookie of the Year Award: 1999
- The Sporting News NBA Rookie of the Year: 1999
- Twyman–Stokes Teammate of the Year Award: 2016
- NBA Sportsmanship Award: 2020

NBA playoff record

- Most three-point field goals made in one half: 8 (May 11, 2001, vs. Philadelphia 76ers, Eastern Conference Semifinals)
- Most consecutive three-point field goals made in one game: 8 (same game as above)
- Most consecutive three-point field goals made in one half: 8 (same game as above)
- First and only 40-year-old player to hit at least three 3-pointers in a playoff game: 3 (April 22, 2017, vs. San Antonio Spurs, Western Conference 1st round)

Toronto Raptors franchise records

- Most points scored in a season: 2,107 (1999–2000)
- Most points scored in a playoff game: 50 (May 11, 2001, vs. Philadelphia 76ers)
- Highest franchise career points per game average: 23.4
- Highest points per game in a season: 27.6 (2000–01)
- Most field goals made in a season: 788 (1999–2000)
- Most field goals made in a game: 20 (January 14, 2000, vs. Milwaukee Bucks)
- Most minutes played in a game: 63 (February 23, 2001, vs. Sacramento Kings)

New Jersey Nets franchise records

- Most points scored in a season: 2,070 (2006–07)

Career highs

- Points: 51 (2 times)
- Field goals made: 20 vs. Milwaukee January 14, 2000
- Three point field goals made: 9 vs. Memphis December 11, 2006
- Free throws made: 23 vs. Miami December 23, 2005
- Rebounds: 16 vs. Washington April 7, 2007
- Assists: 14 vs. Milwaukee January 9, 2009
- Steals: 6 (5 times)
- Blocks: 6 vs. Chicago March 28, 1999

== Video game, TV and film appearances ==
- Cover of NBA 2K25 - Hall of Fame Edition
- Cover of NBA Live 2004
- Cover of NBA Inside Drive 2002
- Feature film Like Mike (2002), in which the fictional Los Angeles Knights have to beat him and the Raptors to secure a first-time playoffs appearance. Carter at first thought Calvin wouldn't be a match for him, but after losing against him and the Knights, he gives Calvin a nod of respect.
- Music videos for Fabolous' "This Is My Party" (2002), and Glenn Lewis' "Back for More" (2003)
- TV series Moesha, as himself in the episode "Mis-Directed Study" (1999)
- Documentary film The Carter Effect (2017), by Sean Menard, about Carter's impact in the Canadian basketball scene; shown at the 2017 Toronto International Film Festival; 60 minutes It was also made available on Netflix.
- Video game Barkley, Shut Up and Jam: Gaiden; Carter has been turned into a cyborg by the evil terrorist organization B.L.O.O.D.M.O.S.E.S.
- Documentary film Vince Carter: Legacy (2021), by Justin C. Polk, about Carter's record breaking 22-season NBA career which spans 4 different calendar decades.
- Host of Vince's Places (2022), on ESPN+, a ten-episode series where Vince takes the viewer on a fun tour through the history of basketball. Guests on season 1 include: Alonzo Mourning, Peyton Manning, Julius Erving, Dominique Wilkins, Mark Cuban, Molly Bolin, Jerry West, Jamaal Wilkes, Patrick Ewing, Dirk Nowitzki, Chris Mullin, Dikembe Mutombo, Gary Payton, Danny Schayes, Marv Albert, Ray Allen, Lusia Harris, Jeff Garcia, Spencer Haywood.

== Personal life ==
Carter married Ellen Rucker, a chiropractor, in July 2004; the couple divorced in 2006. They have one daughter together. Carter is now married to Sondi Carter, an NASM trainer. They have a son and a daughter.

Carter has donated to his high school, Mainland High School, and he established a charitable foundation, The Embassy of Hope, upon being drafted into the NBA in 1998. On February 3, 2007, a statue of Carter was unveiled at Mainland.

Carter visited with the Duquesne University men's basketball team in Pittsburgh as a show of support after five of its players were shot in September 2006.

Carter is also the second cousin of NBA player Tracy McGrady, whose grandmother was the sister of Carter's step-great-grandfather. They were teammates with the Raptors in 1998–2000. Both players were unaware of the relation until a family reunion in 1997.

== Career statistics ==
Legend
GP	Games played	GS	Games started	MPG	Minutes per game
FG%	Field goal percentage	3P%	3-point field goal percentage	FT%	Free throw percentage
RPG	Rebounds per game	APG	Assists per game	SPG	Steals per game
BPG	Blocks per game	PPG	Points per game	**Bold**	Career high
*	Led the league

=== NBA ===
==== Regular season ====
Year	Team	GP	GS	MPG	FG%	3P%	FT%	RPG	APG	SPG	BPG	PPG
1998–99	Toronto	50*	49	35.2	.450	.288	.761	5.7	3.0	1.1	**1.5**	18.3
1999–00	Toronto	**82**	**82***	38.1	.465	.403	.791	5.8	3.9	1.3	1.1	25.7
2000–01	Toronto	75	75	39.7	.460	.408	.765	5.5	3.9	1.5	1.1	**27.6**
2001–02	Toronto	60	60	**39.8**	.428	.387	.798	5.2	4.0	**1.6**	.7	24.7
2002–03	Toronto	43	42	34.2	.467	.344	.806	4.4	3.3	1.1	1.0	20.6
2003–04	Toronto	73	73	38.2	.417	.383	.806	4.8	4.8	1.2	.9	22.5
2004–05	Toronto	20	20	30.4	.411	.322	.694	3.3	3.1	1.3	.8	15.9
2004–05	New Jersey	57	56	38.9	.462	**.425**	.817	5.9	4.7	1.5	.6	27.5
2005–06	New Jersey	79	79	36.8	.430	.341	.799	5.8	4.3	1.2	.7	24.2
2006–07	New Jersey	**82***	**82***	38.1	.454	.357	.802	**6.0**	4.8	1.0	.4	25.2
2007–08	New Jersey	76	72	38.9	.456	.359	.816	**6.0**	**5.1**	1.2	.4	21.3
2008–09	New Jersey	80	80	36.8	.437	.385	.817	5.1	4.7	1.0	.5	20.8
2009–10	Orlando	75	74	30.8	.428	.367	**.840**	3.9	3.1	.7	.2	16.6
2010–11	Orlando	22	22	30.2	**.470**	.346	.747	4.1	2.9	.9	.1	15.1
2010–11	Phoenix	51	41	27.2	.422	.366	.735	3.6	1.6	.9	.3	13.5
2011–12	Dallas	61	40	25.3	.411	.361	.826	3.4	2.3	.9	.4	10.1
2012–13	Dallas	81	3	25.8	.435	.406	.816	4.1	2.4	.9	.5	13.4
2013–14	Dallas	81	0	24.4	.407	.394	.821	3.5	2.6	.8	.4	11.9
2014–15	Memphis	66	1	16.5	.333	.297	.789	2.0	1.2	.7	.2	5.8
2015–16	Memphis	60	3	16.8	.388	.349	.833	2.4	.9	.6	.3	6.6
2016–17	Memphis	73	15	24.6	.394	.378	.765	3.1	1.8	.8	.5	8.0
2017–18	Sacramento	58	5	17.7	.403	.345	.757	2.6	1.2	.7	.4	5.4
2018–19	Atlanta	76	9	17.5	.419	.389	.712	2.6	1.1	.6	.4	7.4
2019–20	Atlanta	60	0	14.6	.352	.302	.793	2.1	.8	.4	.4	5.0
Career		1,541	983	30.7	.435	.371	.798	4.3	3.1	1.0	.6	16.7
All-Star		8	5	18.0	.477	.375	.600	2.6	1.9	.9	.1	10.1

==== Playoffs ====
Year	Team	GP	GS	MPG	FG%	3P%	FT%	RPG	APG	SPG	BPG	PPG
2000	Toronto	3	3	39.7	.300	.100	.871	6.0	**6.3**	1.0	1.3	19.3
2001	Toronto	12	12	**44.9**	.436	.410	.784	6.5	4.7	1.7	**1.7**	27.3
2005	New Jersey	4	4	44.8	.365	.316	.861	**8.5**	5.8	**2.3**	.0	26.8
2006	New Jersey	11	11	40.9	.463	.241	.796	7.0	5.3	1.8	.5	**29.6**
2007	New Jersey	12	12	40.6	.396	.389	.693	6.8	5.3	.9	.6	22.3
2010	Orlando	**14**	**14**	34.4	.402	.235	.826	4.2	2.3	.9	.2	15.5
2012	Dallas	4	0	26.8	.293	.300	.750	5.5	.3	1.2	.5	8.3
2014	Dallas	7	0	27.1	.456	.484	.786	3.6	2.4	.4	.3	12.6
2015	Memphis	11	0	17.8	.403	.250	.889	4.3	1.0	.6	.2	6.3
2016	Memphis	4	4	22.8	.455	**.700**	**1.000**	3.8	1.3	.5	.3	11.3
2017	Memphis	6	6	32.5	**.476**	.400	**1.000**	3.3	1.5	.3	.0	9.2
Career		88	66	34.5	.416	.338	.796	5.4	3.4	1.1	.5	18.1

=== College ===
Year	Team	GP	GS	MPG	FG%	3P%	FT%	RPG	APG	SPG	BPG	PPG
1995–96	North Carolina	31	19	17.9	.492	.345	.689	3.8	1.3	.6	.6	7.5
1996–97	North Carolina	34	34	27.6	.525	.336	**.750**	4.5	**2.4**	**1.4**	.8	13.0
1997–98	North Carolina	**38**	**38**	**31.2**	**.591**	**.411**	.680	**5.1**	1.9	1.2	**.9**	**15.6**
Career		103	91	26.0	.547	.368	.705	4.5	1.9	1.1	.8	12.3

== See also ==
- List of NBA career scoring leaders
- List of NBA career steals leaders
- List of NBA career personal fouls leaders
- List of NBA career 3-point scoring leaders
- List of NBA career minutes played leaders
- List of NBA career games played leaders
- List of NBA career free throw scoring leaders
- List of NBA single-game playoff scoring leaders
- List of oldest and youngest NBA players
- List of NBA seasons played leaders
- List of Olympic medalists in basketball
- NBA regular season records
- NBA post-season records
