= Frédéric Weis =

French basketball player (born 1977)

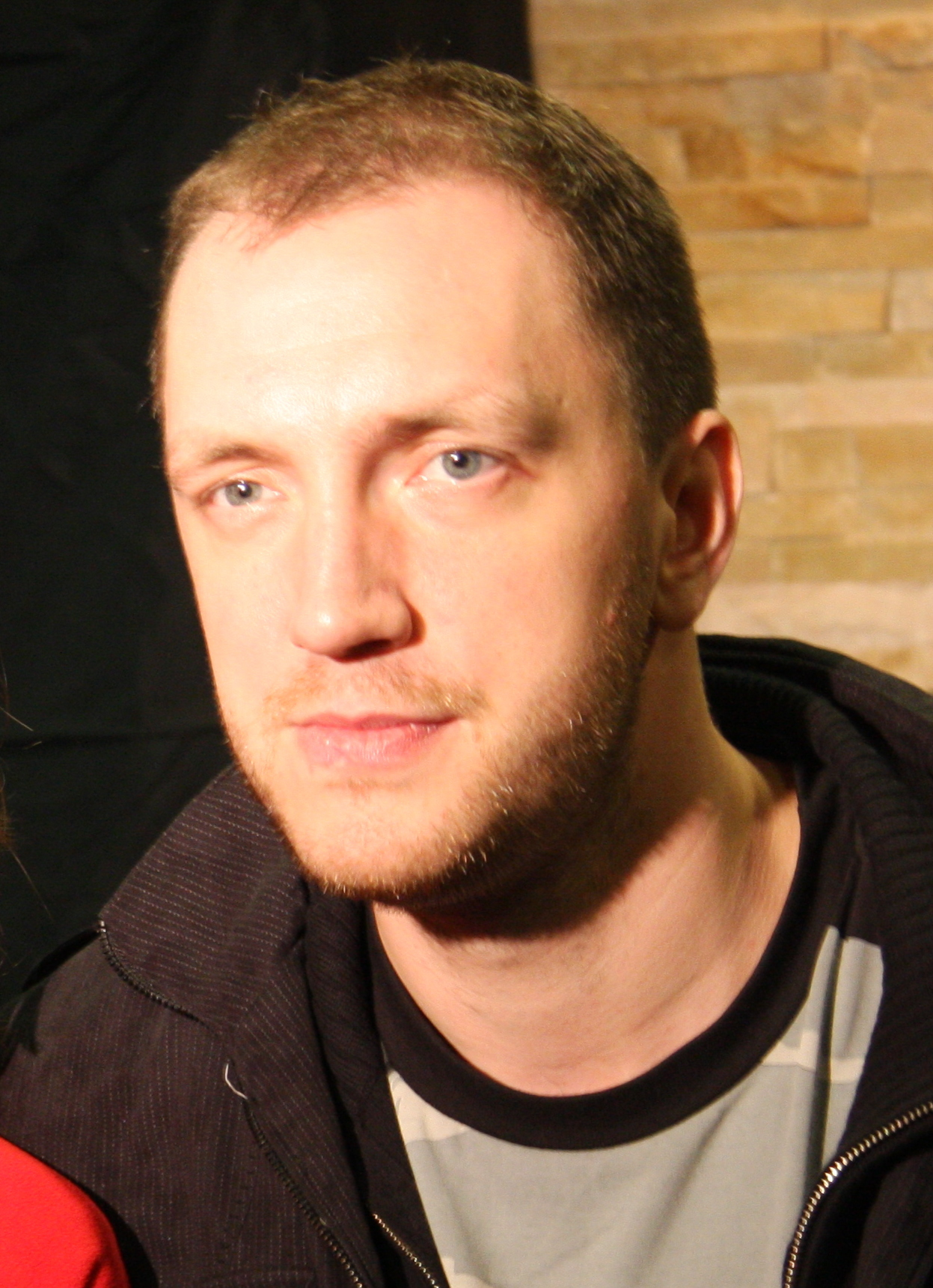
- Weis in 2008

Personal information
- Born: 22 June 1977 (age 49) Thionville, France
- Listed height: 2.18 m (7 ft 2 in)
- Listed weight: 118 kg (260 lb)

Career information
- NBA draft: 1999: 1st round, 15th overall pick
- Drafted by: New York Knicks
- Playing career: 1995–2011
- Position: Center

Career history
- 1995–2000: Limoges CSP
- 2000: PAOK
- 2000–2004: Unicaja Málaga
- 2004–2009: Iurbentia Bilbao
- 2009: ViveMenorca
- 2010–2011: Limoges CSP

Career highlights
- 2× FIBA Korać Cup champion (2000, 2001); French League champion (2000); French Cup winner (2000); 4× French League All-Star (1997–2000)
- Stats at Basketball Reference
Medals
Men's Basketball
Representing France
Summer Olympics
Silver medal – second place	2000 Sydney
EuroBasket
Bronze medal – third place	2005 Serbia & Montenegro

Frédéric Weis (born 22 June 1977) is a French former professional basketball player. Despite being a first-round NBA draft pick, he never played professionally in North America.

== Professional career ==
During his pro career, Weis played with Unicaja Málaga and Iurbentia Bilbao of the Spanish ACB League, PAOK Thessaloniki in the Greek League, and Limoges in the French League. On 28 January 2009, Iurbentia Bilbao waived him after he missed three games due to his health, and on 13 February he signed with ViveMenorca.

In March 2011, he announced his retirement.

=== NBA ===
Weis was selected by the New York Knicks with the 15th overall pick of the 1999 NBA draft. His selection angered many Knicks fans as Ron Artest, who had grown up in Queens, New York and played for St. John's University, was still available. Artest would be selected with the next pick by the Chicago Bulls.

Weis took part in the NBA Summer League and then declined to sign a rookie contract, being convinced by his agent – who was also a minority owner of Weis's team, Limoges – to return to France. Weis ended up never playing in an NBA game, later stating that in spite of his interest in going to North America, the Knicks never directly contacted him about returning. On 29 August 2008 the Knicks traded Weis's draft rights to the Houston Rockets for Patrick Ewing Jr.

== National team career ==
Weis won the silver medal at the 2000 Summer Olympic Games, with the senior French national basketball team. With France's national team he played at the following EuroBaskets: the 1999 EuroBasket, the 2001 EuroBasket, the 2005 EuroBasket, and the 2007 EuroBasket.

At the 2005 EuroBasket, Weis won the bronze medal with his national team. He also played with France's national team at the 2006 FIBA World Championship.

=== "Le dunk de la mort" ===
Weis was "posterized" by the United States' Vince Carter during a game between the U.S. and France at the 2000 Summer Olympic Games on 25 September 2000. After getting the ball off a steal, the 1.98-metre (6 ft 6 in) Carter drove to the basket and spread his legs as he jumped over the 2.18-metre (7 ft 2 in) Weis before dunking the ball ferociously. The French media dubbed the slam "le dunk de la mort": "the dunk of death". The U.S. won the game 106–94. In an ESPN story published on the 15th anniversary of the dunk, Weis said that Carter "deserves to make history. Sadly for me, I was on the video, too. I learned people can fly."

== Personal life ==
In 2002, Weis's wife, Celia, gave birth to a son, Enzo, while Weis was playing in Spain. After Enzo was diagnosed with autism as a toddler, Weis spiraled into alcoholism and depression, and Celia took their son and returned to France.

In 2008, Weis drove to a rest stop in Biarritz and attempted suicide by intentionally overdosing on sleeping pills. After surviving the attempt, Weis quit drinking and reconciled with his wife. Following his retirement from basketball, Weis and Celia began operating a tobacco shop and bar in Limoges.

He is currently a television analyst for French league games.
