= EuroLeague season statistical leaders =

Stats for annual European basketball competition

This page details the EuroLeague's individual season statistical basketball leaders since the 1991–92 season. Under previous EuroLeague competition formats, the "Regular Season" stats leaders were not counted as the official league stats leaders in the EuroLeague. Only the "Full Season" stats leaders were counted as the official league leaders of the EuroLeague. Therefore, playing solely in the "Regular Season" phase of previous EuroLeague season formats, did not qualify a player to be among the league's leaders. To qualify to be among the EuroLeague season stats leaders, a player must play in at least 51% of the possible games that can be played in a given season.

== Season by season league leaders ==
=== Total points per season ===
Since the beginning of the 1984–85 season:

- 1984–85 (Socialist Federal Republic of Yugoslavia) Drazen Petrovic (Cibona Zagreb): 416 (in 14 games)
- 1985–86 (Socialist Federal Republic of Yugoslavia) Drazen Petrovic (Cibona Zagreb): 440 (in 13 games)
- 1986–87 (United States) Kevin Magee (Maccabi Tel Aviv): 358 (in 16 games)
- 1987–88 (United States) - (Greece) Nikos Galis (Aris Thessaloniki): 599 (in 17 games)
- 1988–89 (United States) - (Greece) Nikos Galis (Aris Thessaloniki): 661 (in 20 games)
- 1989–90 (United States) - (Greece) Nikos Galis (Aris Thessaloniki): 644 (in 17 games)
- 1990–91 (United States) - (Greece) Nikos Galis (Aris Thessaloniki): 501 (in 16 games)

=== Points Per Game ===
Since the beginning of the 1991–92 season:

- 1991–92 (United States) - (Greece) Nikos Galis (Aris Thessaloniki): 32.2 (in 16 games)
- 1992–93 (Croatia) Zdravko Radulović (KK Cibona): 23.9 (in 13 games)
- 1993–94 (United States) - (Greece) Nikos Galis (Panathinaikos): 23.8 (in 21 games)
- 1994–95 (Federal Republic of Yugoslavia) - (Serbia) Predrag Danilović (Virtus Bologna): 22.1 (in 17 games)
- 1995–96 (United States) Joe Arlauckas (Real Madrid): 26.4 (in 21 games)
- 1996–97 (Italy) Carlton Myers (Fortitudo Bologna): 22.9 (in 19 games)
- 1997–98 (Federal Republic of Yugoslavia) - (Serbia) Peja Stojaković (PAOK): 20.9 (in 16 games)
- 1998–99 (Turkey) İbrahim Kutluay (Fenerbahçe): 21.4 (in 17 games)
- 1999–00 (Federal Republic of Yugoslavia) Miljan Goljović (Pivovarna Laško): 20.1 (in 16 games)
- 2000–01 (Federal Republic of Yugoslavia) - (Serbia) Miroslav Berić (KK Partizan): 23.2 (in 20 games) (FIBA SuproLeague)
- 2000–01 (United States) Alphonso Ford (Peristeri): 26.0 (in 12 games) (EuroLeague)
- 2001–02 (United States) Alphonso Ford (Olympiacos): 24.7 (in 20 games)
- 2002–03 (Federal Republic of Yugoslavia) - (Serbia) Miloš Vujanić (KK Partizan): 25.7 (in 14 games)
- 2003–04 (United States) Lynn Greer (Śląsk Wrocław): 25.0 (in 14 games)
- 2004–05 (United States) Charles Smith (Scavolini Pesaro): 20.6 (in 20 games)
- 2005–06 (United States) Drew Nicholas (Benetton Treviso): 18.4 (in 20 games)
- 2006–07 (Spain) Juan Carlos Navarro (FC Barcelona): 16.7 (in 22 games) (PPG League Leader)
- 2006–07 (Serbia) Igor Rakočević (TAU Ceramica): 16.2 (in 22 games) (Alphonso Ford Trophy)
- 2007–08 (United States) Marc Salyers (Chorale Roanne): 21.7 (in 14 games)
- 2008–09 (Serbia) Igor Rakočević (TAU Ceramica): 17.9 (in 21 games)
- 2009–10 (Lithuania) Linas Kleiza (Olympiacos): 17.1 (in 22 games)
- 2010–11 (Serbia) Igor Rakočević (Efes Pilsen): 17.2 (in 14 games)
- 2011–12 (United States) - (North Macedonia) Bo McCalebb (Montepaschi Siena): 16.9 (in 17 games)
- 2012–13 (United States) Bobby Brown (Montepaschi Siena): 18.8 (in 24 games)
- 2013–14 (United States) Keith Langford (Olimpia Milano): 17.5 (in 25 games)
- 2014–15 (United States) - (Montenegro) Taylor Rochestie (Nizhny Novgorod): 18.9 (in 21 games)
- 2015–16 (France) Nando De Colo (CSKA Moscow): 19.4 (in 27 games)
- 2016–17 (United States) Keith Langford (Unics Kazan): 21.7 (in 28 games)
- 2017–18 (Russia) Alexey Shved (BC Khimki): 21.7 (in 34 games)
- 2018–19 (United States) Mike James (Olimpia Milano): 19.8 (in 30 games)
- 2019–20 (United States) - (Turkey) Shane Larkin (Efes): 22.2 (in 25 games)
- 2020–21 (Russia) Alexey Shved (Khimki): 19.8 (in 23 games)
- 2021–22 (Serbia) Vasilije Micić (Efes): 18.2 (in 34 games)
- 2022–23 (Bulgaria) - (Greece) Sasha Vezenkov (Olympiacos): 17.6 (in 40 games)
- 2023–24 (Puerto Rico) - (United States) Markus Howard (Baskonia): 19.5 (in 39 games)
- 2024–25 (United States) Carsen Edwards (Baskonia): 20.4 (in 35 games)
- 2025–26 (Bulgaria) - (Greece) Sasha Vezenkov (Olympiacos): 19.0 (in 39 games)

=== Rebounds Per Game ===
Since the beginning of the 1991–92 season:

- 1991–92 (United States) Corny Thompson (Joventut Badalona): 11.7 (in 18 games)
- 1992–93 (Lithuania) Arvydas Sabonis (Real Madrid): 11.9 (in 20 games)
- 1993–94 (United States) Roy Tarpley (Olympiacos): 12.8 (in 19 games)
- 1994–95 (Croatia) Stojko Vranković (Panathinaikos): 12.1 (in 21 games)
- 1995–96 (United States) Charles Shackleford (Ülker): 12.3 (in 18 games)
- 1996–97 (United States) Warren Kidd (Stefanel Milano): 10.5 (in 22 games)
- 1997–98 (Federal Republic of Yugoslavia) - (Serbia) Dejan Tomašević (KK Partizan): 9.6 (in 23 games)
- 1998–99 (Croatia) Žan Tabak (Fenerbahçe): 10.0 (in 18 games)
- 1999–00 (Turkey) Hüseyin Beşok (Efes Pilsen): 10.0 (in 23 games)
- 2000–01 (Italy) Roberto Chiacig (Montepaschi Siena): 9.3 (in 18 games) (FIBA SuproLeague)
- 2000–01 (Federal Republic of Yugoslavia) - (Serbia) Dejan Tomašević (KK Buducnost): 11.5 (in 12 games) (EuroLeague)
- 2001–02 (Serbia) - (Turkey) Mirsad Türkcan (CSKA Moscow): 12.7 (in 17 games)
- 2002–03 (Serbia) - (Turkey) Mirsad Türkcan (Montepaschi Siena): 11.8 (in 21 games)
- 2003–04 (Lithuania) Arvydas Sabonis (Žalgiris Kaunas): 10.7 (in 18 games)
- 2004–05 (United States) Tanoka Beard (Žalgiris Kaunas): 10.6 (in 20 games)
- 2005–06 (Serbia) - (Turkey) Mirsad Türkcan (Ülker): 8.9 (in 16 games)
- 2006–07 (United States) Tanoka Beard (Žalgiris Kaunas): 9.8 (in 14 games)
- 2007–08 (United States) Travis Watson (Olimpia Milano): 9.7 (in 14 games)
- 2008–09 (Serbia) - (Turkey) Mirsad Türkcan (Fenerbahçe Ülker): 8.6 (in 14 games)
- 2009–10 (United States) Travis Watson (Žalgiris Kaunas): 9.4 (in 13 games)
- 2010–11 (Serbia) - (Turkey) Mirsad Türkcan (Fenerbahçe Ülker): 7.3 (in 12 games)
- 2011–12 (Russia) Andrei Kirilenko (CSKA Moscow): 7.4 (in 17 games)
- 2012–13 (Russia) Victor Khryapa (CSKA Moscow): 7.3 (in 26 games)
- 2013–14 (France) Joffrey Lauvergne (Partizan Belgrade): 8.6 (in 24 games)
- 2014–15 (Serbia) Boban Marjanovic (KK Crvena zvezda): 10.6 (in 24 games)
- 2015–16 (Greece) Ioannis Bourousis (Saski Baskonia): 8.6 (in 29 games)
- 2016–17 (United States) - (Nigeria) Ekpe Udoh (KK Fenerbahce): 7.7 (in 31 games)
- 2017–18 (United States) James Augustine (Unicaja Malaga): 6.6 (in 29 games)
- 2018–19 (France) Vincent Poirier (Baskonia): 8.3 (in 34 games)
- 2019–20 (Serbia) Nikola Milutinov (Olympiacos): 8.2 (in 24 games)
- 2020–21 (Serbia) Nikola Milutinov (CSKA): 8.6 (in 20 games)
- 2021–22 (Greece) Georgios Papagiannis (Panathinaikos): 8.2 (in 29 games)
- 2022–23 (France) Mathias Lessort (Partizan): 7.1 (in 38 games)
- 2023–24 (Nigeria) Josh Nebo (Maccabi): 7.1 (in 39 games)
- 2024–25 (Spain) Juancho Hernangómez (Panathinaikos): 7.0 (in 40 games)
- 2025–26 (Serbia) Nikola Milutinov (Olympiacos): 7.2 (in 39 games)

=== Assists Per Game ===
Since the beginning of the 1991–92 season:

- 1991–92 (United States) Micheal Ray Richardson (KK Split): 6.0 (in 14 games)
- 1992–93 (Spain) Nacho Azofra (Estudiantes Madrid): 5.5 (in 12 games)
- 1993–94 (United States) - (Greece) Nikos Galis (Panathinaikos): 4.7 (in 21 games)
- 1994–95 (United States) Chuck Evans (CSKA Moscow): 6.1 (in 13 games)
- 1995–96 (Russia) Vasily Karasev (CSKA Moscow): 7.1 (in 20 games)
- 1996–97 (United States) Michael Anderson (Caja San Fernando): 6.1 (in 17 games)
- 1997–98 (United States) Willie Anderson (AEK Athens): 4.4 (in 12 games)
- 1998–99 (United States) Tyus Edney (Žalgiris Kaunas): 6.1 (in 22 games)
- 1999–00 (United States) David Rivers (TOFAS Bursa): 4.9 (in 16 games)
- 2000–01 (Latvia) Raimonds Miglinieks (Śląsk Wrocław): 6.9 (in 20 games) (FIBA SuproLeague)
- 2000–01 (Croatia) Ivica Marić (KK Zadar): 5.9 (in 10 games) (EuroLeague)
- 2001–02 (United States) Elmer Bennett (Baskonia): 5.2 (in 15 games)
- 2002–03 (United States) - (Panama) Ed Cota (Žalgiris Kaunas): 6.5 (in 14 games)
- 2003–04 (United States) - (Panama) Ed Cota (Žalgiris Kaunas): 5.6 (in 20 games)
- 2004–05 (United States) Mire Chatman (EB Pau-Orthez): 6.2 (in 14 games)
- 2005–06 (Argentina) - (Italy) Pablo Prigioni (Baskonia): 6.24 (in 25 games)
- 2006–07 (Greece) Theodoros Papaloukas (CSKA Moscow): 5.4 (in 25 games)
- 2007–08 (United States) DeJuan Collins (Žalgiris Kaunas): 5.3 (in 20 games)
- 2008–09 (Greece) Theodoros Papaloukas (Olympiacos): 5.1 (in 22 games)
- 2009–10 (United States) - (Montenegro) Omar Cook (Unicaja Málaga): 5.9 (in 16 games)
- 2010–11 (Greece) Dimitris Diamantidis (Panathinaikos): 6.2 (in 22 games)
- 2011–12 (United States) - (Montenegro) Omar Cook (Olimpia Milano): 5.6 (in 16 games)
- 2012–13 (Croatia) Zoran Planinić (Khimki): 6.32 (in 22 games)
- 2013–14 (Greece) Dimitris Diamantidis (Panathinaikos): 6.2 (in 29 games)
- 2014–15 (Serbia) Miloš Teodosić (CSKA Moscow): 7.0 (in 24 games)
- 2015–16 (France) Thomas Heurtel (Efes): 7.9 (in 24 games)
- 2016–17 (Serbia) Miloš Teodosić (CSKA Moscow): 6.7 (in 29 games)
- 2017–18 (United States) - (Greece) Nick Calathes (Panathinaikos): 8.0 (in 31 games)
- 2018–19 (United States) - (Greece) Nick Calathes (Panathinaikos): 8.7 (in 33 games)
- 2019–20 (United States) - (Greece) Nick Calathes (Panathinaikos): 9.1 (in 28 games)
- 2020–21 (Russia) Alexey Shved (Khimki): 7.7 (in 23 games)
- 2021–22 (United States) - (Greece) Nick Calathes (Barcelona): 6.4 (in 29 games)
- 2022–23 (United States) Darius Thompson (Baskonia): 6.7 (in 34 games)
- 2023–24 (Bulgaria) Codi Miller-McIntyre (Baskonia): 7.3 (in 39 games)
- 2024–25 (United States) - (North Macedonia) T. J. Shorts (Paris Basketball): 7.3 (in 37 games)
- 2025–26 (Bulgaria) Codi Miller-McIntyre (Crvena zvezda): 7.4 (in 39 games)

=== Steals Per Game ===
Since the beginning of the 1991–92 season:

- 1991–92 (Italy) Riccardo Pittis (Olimpia Milano): 3.7 (in 19 games)
- 1992–93 (United States) Clinton Wheeler (Bayer Leverkusen): 3.0 (in 17 games)
- 1993–94 (Italy) Riccardo Pittis (Benetton Treviso): 2.9 (in 13 games)
- 1994–95 (Russia) Sergei Panov (CSKA Moscow): 3.0 (in 19 games)
- 1995–96 (Italy) Riccardo Pittis (Benetton Treviso): 2.6 (in 19 games)
- 1996–97 (United States) Michael Anderson (Caja San Fernando): 2.7 (in 17 games)
- 1997–98 (United States) David Rivers (Fortitudo Bologna): 2.8 (in 21 games)
- 1998–99 (United States) Gerald Lewis (KK Zadar): 2.5 (in 15 games)
- 1999–00 (Italy) Andrea Meneghin (Pallacanestro Varese): 2.9 (in 16 games)
- 2000–01 (United States) Ralph Biggs (Telindus Oostende): 2.1 (in 20 games) (FIBA SuproLeague)
- 2000–01 (Croatia) Ivica Marić (KK Zadar) & (United States) Jemeil Rich (Lugano Snakes): 3.7 (in 10 games) (EuroLeague)
- 2001–02 (Argentina) - (Italy) Manu Ginóbili (Virtus Bologna): 2.5 (in 22 games)
- 2002–03 (Spain) Jorge Garbajosa (Benetton Treviso) & (Italy) Riccardo Pittis (Benetton Treviso): 2.2 (in 22 games)
- 2003–04 (United States) Fred House (KK Partizan): 3.3 (in 13 games)
- 2004–05 (United States) Chris Williams (Frankfurt Skyliners): 2.7 (in 14 games)
- 2005–06 (United States) Jeff Trepagnier (Ülker): 3.0 (in 20 games)
- 2006–07 (Spain) Ricky Rubio (Joventut Badalona): 3.1 (in 16 games)
- 2007–08 (United States) - (Italy) Shaun Stonerook (Montepaschi Siena): 2.5 (in 24 games)
- 2008–09 (United States) - (Poland) David Logan (Asseco Prokom): 2.6 (in 15 games)
- 2009–10 (United States) - (North Macedonia) Bo McCalebb (KK Partizan) & (Russia) Victor Khryapa (CSKA Moscow): 1.9 (in 22 games)
- 2010–11 (United States) Chuck Eidson (Maccabi Tel Aviv): 2.6 (in 22 games)
- 2011–12 (United States) Jamon Gordon (Galatasaray): 1.8 (in 16 games)
- 2012–13 (United States) - (North Macedonia) Bo McCalebb (Fenerbahçe Ülker): 1.9 (in 23 games)
- 2013–14 (United States) Jamon Gordon (Anadolu Efes): 2.0 (in 21 games)
- 2014–15 (United States) Tarence Kinsey (Nizhny Novgorod): 1.5 (in 17 games)
- 2015–16 (United States) - (Greece) Nick Calathes (Panathinaikos): 2.0 (in 27 games)
- 2016–17 (United States) - (Serbia) Charles Jenkins (Crvena zvezda): 2.0 (in 30 games)
- 2017–18 (United States) - (Greece) Nick Calathes (Panathinaikos): 1.7 (in 31 games)
- 2018–19 (United States) - (Greece) Nick Calathes (Panathinaikos): 1.7 (in 33 games)
- 2019–20 (United States) - (Senegal) Pierriá Henry (Baskonia): 1.6 (in 25 games)
- 2020–21 (United States) - (Senegal) Pierriá Henry (Baskonia): 1.7 (in 34 games)
- 2021–22 (United States) John Brown (UNICS): 2.8 (in 25 games)
- 2022–23 (United States) - (Greece) Thomas Walkup (Olympiacos): 1.8 (in 41 games)
- 2023–24 (United States) - (Cameroon) Paris Lee (ASVEL): 1.7 (in 33 games)
- 2024–25 (United States) - (Germany) Nick Weiler-Babb (Bayern Munich): 1.5 (in 34 games)
- 2025–26 (Senegal) Alpha Diallo (AS Monaco): 1.4 (in 41 games)

=== Blocks Per Game ===
Since the beginning of the 2000–01 season:

- 2000–01 (Russia) Andrei Kirilenko (CSKA Moscow): 2.1 (in 22 games) (FIBA SuproLeague)
- 2000–01 (Ukraine) Grigorij Khizhnyak (Žalgiris Kaunas): 3.1 (in 12 games) (EuroLeague)
- 2001–02 (Ukraine) Grigorij Khizhnyak (Žalgiris Kaunas): 3.2 (in 14 games)
- 2002–03 (Spain) Eduardo Hernández-Sonseca (Real Madrid): 1.5 (in 14 games)
- 2003–04 (Lithuania) Arvydas Sabonis (Žalgiris Kaunas): 1.6 (in 18 games)
- 2004–05 (Lithuania) Eurelijus Žukauskas (Ülker): 1.8 (in 22 games)
- 2005–06 (Lithuania) Darjuš Lavrinovič (Žalgiris Kaunas): 2.1 (in 20 games)
- 2006–07 (United States) Marcus Haislip (Efes Pilsen): 1.7 (in 20 games)
- 2007–08 (Turkey) Ömer Aşık (Fenerbahçe Ülker): 2.0 (in 15 games)
- 2008–09 (Spain) Fran Vázquez (FC Barcelona): 1.7 (in 23 games)
- 2009–10 (United States) - (Israel) D'or Fischer (Maccabi Tel Aviv): 1.8 (in 20 games)
- 2010–11 (Slovenia) Mirza Begić (Žalgiris Kaunas/Real Madrid): 1.5 (in 16 games)
- 2011–12 (Russia) Andrei Kirilenko (CSKA Moscow): 1.9 (in 17 games)
- 2012–13 (Guyana) - (United States) Shawn James (Maccabi Tel Aviv): 1.9 (in 27 games)
- 2013–14 (United States) - (Armenia) Bryant Dunston (Olympiacos): 1.3 (in 29 games)
- 2014–15 (Belarus) Artsiom Parakhouski (Nizhny Novgorod): 1.9 (in 23 games)
- 2015–16 (United States) - (Nigeria) Ekpe Udoh (Fenerbahçe): 2.2 (in 27 games)
- 2016–17 (United States) - (Nigeria) Ekpe Udoh (Fenerbahçe): 2.1 (in 31 games)
- 2017–18 (United States) - (Armenia) Bryant Dunston (Anadolu Efes Istanbul): 1.7 (in 30 games)
- 2018–19 (Cape Verde) Edy Tavares (Real Madrid): 1.7 (in 34 games)
- 2019–20 (Cape Verde) Edy Tavares (Real Madrid): 2.2 (in 28 games)
- 2020–21 (Cape Verde) Edy Tavares (Real Madrid): 1.7 (in 36 games)
- 2021–22 (Cape Verde) Edy Tavares (Real Madrid): 1.7 (in 35 games) & (Greece) Georgios Papagiannis (Panathinaikos): 1.7 (in 29 games)
- 2022–23 (Cape Verde) Edy Tavares (Real Madrid): 2.2 (in 40 games)
- 2023–24 (Cape Verde) Edy Tavares (Real Madrid): 1.5 (in 34 games)
- 2024–25 (Greece) Georgios Papagiannis (Monaco): 1.3 (in 29 games) & (France) Vincent Poirier (Anadolu Efes): 1.3 (in 39 games)
- 2025–26 (Cape Verde) Edy Tavares (Real Madrid): 1.8 (in 39 games)

=== Average Index Rating (PIR) ===
Since the beginning of the 2000–01 season:

- 2000–01 (Federal Republic of Yugoslavia) - (Serbia) Dejan Tomašević (KK Buducnost): 30.9 (in 12 games)
- 2001–02 (Serbia) - (Turkey) Mirsad Türkcan (CSKA Moscow): 25.8 (in 17 games)
- 2002–03 (Serbia) - (Turkey) Mirsad Türkcan (Montepaschi Siena): 24.0 (in 21 games)
- 2003–04 (Lithuania) Arvydas Sabonis (Žalgiris Kaunas): 26.2 (in 18 games)
- 2004–05 (United States) Anthony Parker (Maccabi Tel Aviv): 24.8 (in 24 games)
- 2005–06 (United States) Anthony Parker (Maccabi Tel Aviv): 20.5 (in 25 games)
- 2006–07 (Croatia) Nikola Vujčić (Maccabi Tel Aviv): 21.7 (in 22 games)
- 2007–08 (United States) Marc Salyers (Chorale Roanne): 22.5 (in 14 games)
- 2008–09 (United States) - (Israel) - D'or Fischer (Maccabi Tel Aviv): 21.4 (in 13 games)
- 2009–10 (Australia) - (Serbia) Aleks Marić (KK Partizan): 21.1 (in 18 games)
- 2010–11 (Spain) Fernando San Emeterio (Baskonia): 19.0 (in 20 games)
- 2011–12 (Russia) Andrei Kirilenko (CSKA Moscow): 24.1 (in 17 games)
- 2012–13 (United States) Bobby Brown (Montepaschi Siena): 17.3 (in 24 games)
- 2013–14 (United States) Keith Langford (Olimpia Milano): 17.6 (in 25 games)
- 2014–15 (Serbia) Boban Marjanović (Red Star): 25.7 (in 24 games)
- 2015–16 (France) Nando de Colo (CSKA Moscow): 24.3 (in 27 games)
- 2016–17 (United States) Keith Langford (Olimpia Milano): 21.8 (in 28 games)
- 2017–18 (Slovenia) Luka Dončić (Real Madrid): 21.6 (in 33 games)
- 2018–19 (United States) Mike James (Olimpia Milano): 20.2 (in 30 games)
- 2019–20 (United States) - (Turkey) Shane Larkin (Efes): 25.8 (in 25 games)
- 2020–21 (United States) Mike James (CSKA Moscow): 19.7 (in 27 games)
- 2021–22 (Spain) Nikola Mirotić (Barcelona): 20.1 (in 38 games)
- 2022–23 (Bulgaria) - (Greece) Sasha Vezenkov (Olympiacos): 21.5 (in 40 games)
- 2023–24 (United States) - (Turkey) Shane Larkin (Anadolu Efes): 19.9 (in 35 games)
- 2024–25 (Bulgaria) - (Greece) Sasha Vezenkov (Olympiacos): 23.7 (in 38 games)
- 2025–26 (Bulgaria) - (Greece) Sasha Vezenkov (Olympiacos): 22.1 (in 39 games)

== Season statistical leaders by category ==
=== 1991–92 ===
Points per game:

1. Nikos Galis (Aris Thessaloniki): 32.2
2. Velimir Perasović (Slobodna Dalmacija Split): 25.5
3. Zdravko Radulović (Cibona Zagreb): 24.3
4. Bill Varner (Maes Pils Mechelen): 24.1
5. Tiit Sokk (Tout Giannopoulos) (Kalev Tallinn): 23.4
6. Mike Mitchell (Maccabi Tel Aviv): 22.5
7. Doron Jamchi (Maccabi Tel Aviv): 22.1
8. Aivar Kuusmaa (Kalev Tallinn): 21.1
9. Hugues Occansey (Olympique d'Antibes): 20.6
10. Harold Pressley (Joventut Badalona): 20.3
11. Predrag Danilović (Partizan Belgrade): 19.3
12. Clinton Wheeler (TSV Bayer 04 Leverkusen): 18.9

Rebounds per game:

1. Corny Thompson (Joventut Badalona): 11.7
2. Lee Johnson (Olympique d'Antibes): 10.2
3. Zoran Savić (FC Barcelona): 9.7
4. Christian Welp (TSV Bayer 04 Leverkusen): 9.5
5. Darryl Dawkins (Philips Milano): 9.2
6. Anthony Avent (Phonola Caserta): 9
7. Sergei Babenko (Kalev Tallinn): 8.6
8. Ben Coleman (FC Barcelona): 8.4
9. Mychal Thompson (Phonola Caserta): 8.38
10. Harold Pressley (Joventut Badalona): 8.31
11. Bill Wennington (Knorr Bologna): 8.1
12. Rickie Winslow (Estudiantes Madrid): 8.0

Assists per game:

1. Micheal Ray Richardson (Slobodna Dalmacija Split): 6.0
2. Guy Goodes (Maccabi Tel Aviv): 4.5
3. Clinton Wheeler (TSV Bayer 04 Leverkusen): 4.2
4. Nacho Azofra (Estudiantes Madrid): 3.8
5. Aleksandar Đorđević (Partizan Belgrade): 3.7
6. Nikos Galis (Aris Thessaloniki): 3.6
7. Cornelis Van Rootselaar (Commodore Den Helder): 3.4
8. Rafael Jofresa (Joventut Badalona): 3.2
9. Robert Smith (Olympique d'Antibes): 3.0
10. Ferdinando Gentile (Phonola Caserta): 2.9
11. Riccardo Pittis (Philips Milano): 2.7
12. Aivar Kuusmaa (Kalev Tallinn): 2.6

Steals per game:

1. Riccardo Pittis (Philips Milano): 3.7
2. Micheal Ray Richardson (Slobodna Dalmacija Split): 2.9
3. Predrag Danilović (Partizan Belgrade): 2.2
4. Darryl Dawkins (Philips Milano): 2.1
5. Clinton Wheeler (TSV Bayer 04 Leverkusen): 2.0
6. Claudio Coldebella (Knorr Bologna): 2

=== 1992–93 ===
Points per game:

1. Zdravko Radulović (Cibona Zagreb): 23.9
2. Žarko Paspalj (Olympiacos Piraeus): 23.8
3. Branislav Prelević (PAOK Thessaloniki): 21.58
4. Bill Varner (Maes Pils Mechelen): 21.52
5. Toni Kukoč (Benetton Treviso): 21.0
6. Michael Young (CSP Limoges): 20.947
7. Walter Berry (Olympiacos Piraeus): 20.941
8. Terry Teagle (Benetton Treviso): 19.7
9. Doron Jamchi (Maccabi Tel Aviv): 19.2
10. Predrag Danilović (Knorr Bologna): 18.7
11. Clinton Wheeler (TSV Bayer 04 Leverkusen): 17.5
12. Gheorghe Mureșan (EB Pau Orthez): 17.3

Rebounds per game:

1. Arvydas Sabonis (Real Madrid): 11.9
2. Cliff Levingston (PAOK Thessaloniki): 11.5
3. Walter Berry (Olympiacos Piraeus): 9.9
4. Corny Thompson (Joventut Badalona): 9.6
5. Stefano Rusconi (Benetton Treviso): 9.1
6. Emilio Kovačić (KK Zadar): 9
7. Gheorghe Mureșan (EB Pau Orthez): 8.8
8. Orlando Phillips (EB Pau Orthez): 8.57
9. Panagiotis Fasoulas (PAOK Thessaloniki): 8.52
10. Christian Welp (TSV Bayer 04 Leverkusen): 8.5
11. Ferran Martínez (Joventut Badalona): 8.1
12. Rickey Brown (Real Madrid): 8

Assists per game:

1. Nacho Azofra (Estudiantes Madrid): 5.5
2. Toni Kukoč (Benetton Treviso): 5
3. Valéry Demory (EB Pau Orthez): 4.1
4. Didier Gadou (EB Pau Orthez): 3.9
5. Clinton Wheeler (TSV Bayer 04 Leverkusen): 3.6
6. José Miguel Antúnez (Real Madrid): 3.3
7. Darko Pahlić (KK Zadar): 3.0
8. Branislav Prelević (PAOK Thessaloniki): 3
9. Pablo Martínez (Estudiantes Madrid): 2.9
10. John Korfas (PAOK Thessaloniki): 2.8
11. Jure Zdovc (CSP Limoges): 2.7
12. Henning Harnisch (TSV Bayer 04 Leverkusen): 2.7

Steals per game:

1. Clinton Wheeler (TSV Bayer 04 Leverkusen): 3
2. Pete Myers (Scavolini Pesaro): 2.8
3. Haywoode Workman (Scavolini Pesaro): 2.52
4. Nadav Henefeld (Maccabi Tel Aviv): 2.5
5. Henning Harnisch (TSV Bayer 04 Leverkusen): 2.17
6. Toni Kukoč (Benetton Treviso): 2.11

=== 1993–94 ===
Points per game:

1. Nikos Galis (Panathinaikos Athens): 23.8
2. Michael Young (CSP Limoges): 23.5
3. Žarko Paspalj (Olympiacos Piraeus): 20.9
4. Roy Tarpley (Olympiacos Piraeus): 20.8
5. Predrag Danilović (Buckler Bologna): 20
6. Jean-Jacques Conceição (Benfica Lisboa): 19.2
7. Bill Varner (Maes Pils Mechelen): 18.4
8. Carlos Lisboa (Benfica Lisboa): 18.3
9. Alexander Volkov (Panathinaikos Athens): 18.2
10. Geert Hammink (Clear Cantù): 18
11. Ivica Žurić (Cibona Zagreb): 17.8
12. Arvydas Sabonis (Real Madrid): 17.4
13. Tony Massenburg (FC Barcelona): 17.4

Rebounds per game:

1. Roy Tarpley (Olympiacos Piraeus): 12.8
2. Arvydas Sabonis (Real Madrid): 11.8
3. Larry Richard (Efes Pilsen Istanbul): 11.5
4. Jean-Jacques Conceição (Benfica Lisboa): 11.18
5. Stojan Vranković (Panathinaikos Athens): 11.15
6. Tony Massenburg (FC Barcelona): 10.7
7. Abdul Shamsid-Deen (TSV Bayer 04 Leverkusen): 9.5
8. Panagiotis Fasoulas (Olympiacos Piraeus): 8.789
9. Emilio Kovačić (Cibona Zagreb): 8.785
10. Mike Smith (Joventut Badalona): 8.3
11. Augusto Binelli (Buckler Bologna): 8.1
12. Alexander Volkov (Panathinaikos Athens): 8.0

Assists per game:

1. Nikos Galis (Panathinaikos Athens): 4.7
2. Joseph Byrd (Guildford Kings): 4.1
3. Vladan Alanović (Cibona Zagreb): 3.53
4. Pedro Miguel (Benfica Lisboa): 3.5
5. Tom Garrick (TSV Bayer 04 Leverkusen): 3.4
6. Petar Naumoski (Efes Pilsen Istanbul): 3.3
7. Valéry Demory (EB Pau Orthez): 3.1
8. Frédéric Fauthoux (EB Pau Orthez): 2.937
9. Arvydas Sabonis (Real Madrid): 2.933
10. Claudio Coldebella (Buckler Bologna): 2.8
11. José Miguel Antúnez (Real Madrid): 2.6
12. Alberto Rossini (Clear Cantù): 2.5

Steals per game:

1. Riccardo Pittis (Benetton Treviso): 2.9
2. Carlos Lisboa (Benfica Lisboa): 2.5
3. Ufuk Sarıca (Efes Pilsen Istanbul): 2.3
4. Tom Garrick (TSV Bayer 04 Leverkusen): 2.25
5. Claudio Coldebella (Buckler Bologna): 2.23
6. Michael Koch (TSV Bayer 04 Leverkusen): 2.0

=== 1994–95 ===
Points per game:

1. Predrag Danilović (Buckler Bologna): 22.1
2. Eddie Johnson (Olympiacos Piraeus): 21.9
3. Arvydas Sabonis (Real Madrid): 21.8
4. Michael Young (CSP Limoges): 20.1
5. Žarko Paspalj (Panathinaikos Athens): 19.7
6. Joe Arlauckas (Real Madrid): 19.5
7. Dusan Hauptman (Smelt Olimpija Ljubljana): 19
8. Jean-Jacques Conceição (Benfica Lisboa): 18.9
9. Veljko Mršić (Cibona Zagreb): 18.7
10. Antonello Riva (Scavolini Pesaro): 17.7
11. Doron Jamchi (Maccabi Tel Aviv): 17.35
12. Ufuk Sarıca (Efes Pilsen Istanbul): 17.33

Rebounds per game:

1. Stojan Vranković (Panathinaikos Athens): 12.1
2. Jean-Jacques Conceição (Benfica Lisboa): 11.5
3. Arvydas Sabonis (Real Madrid): 11.1
4. Joe Binion (Buckler Bologna): 10.2
5. Dean Garrett (Scavolini Pesaro): 9.6
6. Radisav Ćurčić (Maccabi Tel Aviv): 9.2
7. Vitali Nosov (Smelt Olimpija Ljubljana): 9.1
8. Reggie Cross (Efes Pilsen Istanbul): 9.0
9. Zoran Savić (PAOK Thessaloniki): 8.1
10. Howard Wright (Joventut Badalona): 8.0
11. Evgeni Kisurin (CSKA Moscow): 7.4
12. Ferran Martínez (FC Barcelona): 7.2

Assists per game:

1. Chuck Evans (CSKA Moscow): 6.1
2. Guy Goodes (Maccabi Tel Aviv): 4.4
3. Pedro Miguel (Benfica Lisboa): 4.3
4. Vasily Karasev (CSKA Moscow): 4.1
5. Tom Garrick (TSV Bayer 04 Leverkusen): 3.8
6. Giorgos Sigalas (Olympiacos Piraeus): 3.5
7. Branislav Prelević (PAOK Thessaloniki): 3.4
8. José Miguel Antúnez (Real Madrid): 3.3
9. John Korfas (PAOK Thessaloniki): 3.08
10. Henning Harnisch (TSV Bayer 04 Leverkusen): 3.06
11. Rafael Jofresa (Joventut Badalona): 2.8
12. Gerrod Abram (Cibona Zagreb): 2.8

Steals per game:

1. Sergei Panov (CSKA Moscow): 3
2. Chris Corchiani (Efes Pilsen Istanbul): 2.7
3. Igor Kudelin (CSKA Moscow): 2.6
4. Gerrod Abram (Cibona Zagreb): 2.5
5. Nadav Henefeld (Maccabi Tel Aviv): 2.2
6. Reggie Cross (Efes Pilsen Istanbul): 2.1

=== 1995–96 ===
Points per game:

1. Joe Arlauckas (Real Madrid): 26.4
2. Tony Dawson (TSV Bayer 04 Leverkusen): 24.8
3. Arijan Komazec (Buckler Bologna): 24
4. Henry Williams (Benetton Treviso): 22
5. Tony White (Olympique d'Antibes): 22
6. Antoine Rigaudeau (EB Pau Orthez): 21.6
7. Artūras Karnišovas (FC Barcelona): 20.7
8. Dominique Wilkins (Panathinaikos Athens): 20.1
9. David Rivers (Olympiacos Piraeus): 19.6
10. Charles Shackleford (Ulker Istanbul): 19.5
11. Orlando Woolridge (Buckler Bologna): 19.3
12. Xavier McDaniel (Iraklis Thessaloniki): 18.3

Rebounds per game:

1. Charles Shackleford (Ulker Istanbul): 12.3
2. Stojan Vranković (Panathinaikos Athens): 10.2
3. Kenny Miller (Unicaja Málaga): 9.8
4. Julius Nwosu (CSKA Moscow): 9.2
5. Xavier McDaniel (Iraklis Thessaloniki): 7.8
6. Evgeni Kisurin (CSKA Moscow): 7.5
7. Panagiotis Papachronis (Iraklis Thessaloniki): 7.4
8. Radisav Ćurčić (Maccabi Tel Aviv): 7.37
9. Dominique Wilkins (Panathinaikos Athens): 7.35
10. Jean-Jacques Conceição (Benfica Lisboa): 7.0
11. Tom Chambers (Maccabi Tel Aviv): 6.769
12. Panagiotis Fasoulas (Olympiacos Piraeus): 6.764

Assists per game:

1. Vasily Karasev (CSKA Moscow): 7.2
2. Lefteris Kakiousis (Iraklis Thessaloniki): 5.5
3. Pablo Laso (Real Madrid): 4.8
4. David Rivers (Olympiacos Piraeus): 4.2
5. Chris Corchiani (TSV Bayer 04 Leverkusen): 4.18
6. Orhun Ene (Ulker Istanbul): 4.11
7. José Luis Galilea (FC Barcelona): 3.64
8. Davide Bonora (Benetton Treviso): 3.63
9. Didier Gadou (EB Pau Orthez): 3.2
10. Gundars Vētra (CSKA Moscow): 3.15
11. Igor Kudelin (CSKA Moscow): 3.1
12. Antoine Rigaudeau (Pau Orthez): 3.0

Steals per game:

1. Riccardo Pittis (Benetton Treviso): 2.6
2. Ignacio Rodríguez (Unicaja Málaga): 2.5
3. Chris Corchiani (TSV Bayer 04 Leverkusen): 2.3
4. David Rivers (Olympiacos Piraeus): 2.29
5. Nadav Henefeld (Maccabi Tel Aviv): 2.25
6. Vladan Alanović (Cibona Zagreb): 2.0

=== 1996–97 ===
Points per game:

1. Carlton Myers (Teamsystem Bologna): 22.9
2. Arijan Komazec (Kinder Bologna): 21.9
3. Petar Naumoski (Efes Pilsen Istanbul): 20.5
4. Harper Williams (Estudiantes Madrid): 19.0
5. Delaney Rudd (ASVEL Villeurbanne): 18.0
6. Michael Anderson (Caja San Fernando Sevilla): 17.8
7. David Rivers (Olympiacos Piraeus): 17.1
8. Miroslav Berić (Partizan Belgrade): 17.1
9. Zoran Savić (Kinder Bologna): 17.0
10. Yann Bonato (CSP Limoges): 16.7
11. Damir Mulaomerović (Cibona Zagreb): 16.4
12. Dan Godfread (Ulker Istanbul): 16.3

Rebounds per game:

1. Warren Kidd (Stefanel Milano): 10.5
2. Vitali Nosov (Dynamo Moscow): 10.1
3. Hansi Gnad (TSV Bayer 04 Leverkusen): 9.1
4. Kevin Rankin (Ulker Istanbul): 8.18
5. Conrad McRae (Teamsystem Bologna): 8.15
6. Dragan Tarlać (Olympiacos Piraeus): 8.10
7. Randy White (Maccabi Tel Aviv): 7.8
8. Dejan Tomašević (Partizan Belgrade): 7.7
9. Zoran Savić (Kinder Bologna): 7.5
10. Geert Hammink (Panionios Athens): 7.1
11. Evgeni Kisurin (Cibona Zagreb): 7.0
12. Dan Godfread (Ulker Istanbul): 6.8

Assists per game:

1. Michael Anderson (Caja San Fernando Sevilla): 6.1
2. Delaney Rudd (ASVEL Villeurbanne): 5.7
3. Petar Naumoski (Efes Pilsen Istanbul): 4.4
4. Aleksandar Đorđević (FC Barcelona): 4.1
5. Saša Obradović (Alba Berlin): 3.88
6. Oleg Meleshchenko (Dynamo Moscow): 3.87
7. Sergei Bazarevich (CSKA Moscow): 3.75
8. Byron Dinkins (Panathinaikos Athens): 3.75
9. Henrik Rödl (Alba Berlin): 3.70
10. Giorgos Sigalas (Olympiacos Piraeus): 3.59
11. Damir Mulaomerović (Cibona Zagreb): 3.55
12. David Rivers (Olympiacos Piraeus): 3.4

Steals per game:

1. Michael Anderson (Caja San Fernando Sevilla): 2.7
2. Petar Naumoski (Efes Pilsen Istanbul): 2.3
3. Arijan Komazec (Kinder Bologna): 2.1
4. Ronald Ellis (Spirou Charleroi): 2.06
5. Josip Vranković (Croatia Osiguranje Split): 2.06
6. Evgeni Kisurin (Cibona Zagreb): 2.05

=== 1997–98 ===
Points per game:

1. Peja Stojaković (PAOK Thessaloniki) 20.9
2. Harun Erdenay (Ulker Istanbul) 20.0
3. Oded Kattash (Maccabi Tel Aviv) 19.5
4. Petar Naumoski (Efes Pilsen Istanbul) 19.1
5. Henry Williams (Benetton Treviso) 18.2
6. Dominique Wilkins (Teamsystem Bologna) 17.8
7. Radisav Ćurčić (Hapoel Jerusalem) 17.7
8. Željko Rebrača (Benetton Treviso) 17.6
9. Predrag Danilović (Kinder Bologna) 17.5
10. Artūras Karnišovas (Olympiacos Piraeus) 17.0
11. Wendell Alexis (Alba Berlin) 16.8
12. Nuno Marçal (FC Porto) 16.2

Rebounds per game:

1. Dejan Tomašević (Partizan Belgrade): 9.6
2. Mirsad Türkcan (Efes Pilsen Istanbul): 9.2
3. Conrad McRae (PAOK Thessaloniki): 8.7
4. Glen Whisby (Estudiantes Madrid): 8.2
5. Kenny Williams (Hapoel Jerusalem): 8
6. Marcus Webb (CSKA Moscow): 7.8
7. Rogelio Legasa (FC Porto): 7.7
8. Victor Alexander (AEK Athens): 7.5
9. Rickie Winslow (Turk Telekom Ankara): 7.5
10. Éric Struelens (PSG Racing Basket): 7.26
11. Richard Scott (Turk Telekom Ankara): 7.25
12. Roberto Chiacig (Teamsystem Bologna): 7.2

Assists per game:

1. Willie Anderson (AEK Athens): 4.4
2. Petar Naumoski (Efes Pilsen Istanbul): 4.17
3. Aleksandar Đorđević (FC Barcelona): 4.11
4. Henrik Rödl (Alba Berlin): 3.9
5. Oded Kattash (Maccabi Tel Aviv): 3.63
6. Damir Mulaomerović (Cibona Zagreb): 3.61
7. Michael Anderson (Ulker Istanbul): 3.5
8. Sergei Bazarevich (Turk Telekom): 3.4
9. Michael Hawkins (Olympiacos Piraeus): 3.3
10. Predrag Danilović (Kinder Bologna): 3.1
11. Vasily Karasev (Alba Berlin): 3
12. Chucky Atkins (Cibona Zagreb): 3
13. Arsène Ade-Mensah (PSG Racing Basket): 3

Steals per game:

1. David Rivers (Teamsystem Bologna): 2.8
2. Vladan Alanović (Croatia Osiguranje Split): 2.7
3. Sergei Panov (CSKA Moscow): 2.54
4. Michael Anderson (Ulker Istanbul): 2.5
5. Antoine Rigaudeau (Kinder Bologna): 2.45
6. Hugo Sconochini (Kinder Bologna): 2.4

=== 1998–99 ===
Points per game:

1. İbrahim Kutluay (Fenerbahçe Istanbul): 21.4
2. Dejan Bodiroga (Panathinaikos Athens): 20.2
3. Harun Erdenay (Ulker Istanbul): 20.1
4. Veljko Mršić (Varese Roosters): 19.6
5. Oded Kattash (Maccabi Tel Aviv): 19.07
6. Petar Naumoski (Efes Pilsen Istanbul): 19.05
7. Dino Rađa (Panathinaikos Athens): 17.4
8. Victor Alexander (Maccabi Tel Aviv): 17.3
9. Antoine Rigaudeau (Kinder Bologna): 17.28
10. Valeri Daineko (CSKA Moscow): 17.22
11. Walter Berry (PAOK Thessaloniki): 16.86
12. Predrag Danilović (Kinder Bologna): 16.85

Rebounds per game:

1. Žan Tabak (Fenerbahçe Istanbul): 10
2. Hüseyin Beşok (Efes Pilsen Istanbul): 9.6
3. Victor Alexander (Maccabi Tel Aviv): 8.9
4. Conrad McRae (Fenerbahçe Istanbul): 8.8
5. Gintaras Einikis (Avtodor Saratov): 8.6
6. Sherron Mills (TDK Manresa): 8.3
7. Tanoka Beard (Real Madrid): 8.2
8. Dino Rađa (Panathinaikos Athens): 8.1
9. Walter Berry (PAOK Thessaloniki): 7.86
10. Nikola Prkačin (Cibona Zagreb): 7.84
11. Kevin Rankin (Ulker Istanbul): 7.2
12. Dragan Tarlać (Olympiacos Piraeus): 6.7

Assists per game:

1. Tyus Edney (Žalgiris Kaunas): 6.1
2. Delaney Rudd (ASVEL Villeurbanne): 5.9
3. Petar Naumoski (Efes Pilsen Istanbul): 5.78
4. Gianmarco Pozzecco (Varese Roosters): 5.76
5. Elmer Bennett (TAU Ceramica Vitoria): 5.6
6. Evgeniy Pashutin (Avtodor Saratov): 5.5
7. Michael Anderson (Ulker Istanbul): 5.2
8. Henrik Rödl (Alba Berlin): 4.2
9. José Lasa (Real Madrid): 3.8
10. Oded Kattash (Maccabi Tel Aviv): 3.7
11. Dejan Bodiroga (Panathinaikos Athens): 3.6
12. Vasily Karasev (CSKA Moscow): 3.6

Steals per game:

1. Gerald Lewis (KK Zadar): 2.53
2. Michael Anderson (Ulker Istanbul): 2.52
3. Ariel McDonald (Union Olimpija Ljubljana): 2.4
4. Emilio Kovačić (KK Zadar): 2.3
5. Andrea Meneghin (Varese Roosters): 2.1
6. Alberto Herreros (Real Madrid): 2.0

=== 1999–00 ===
Points per game:

1. Miljan Goljović (Pivovarna Lasko): 20.1
2. David Rivers (TOFAS Bursa): 19.7
3. Wendell Alexis (Alba Berlin): 18.5
4. Nate Huffman (Maccabi Tel Aviv): 18.1
5. Dejan Bodiroga (Panathinaikos Athens): 17.2
6. Dejan Tomašević (Buducnost Podgorica): 17.1
7. Tyus Edney (Benetton Treviso): 16.9
8. James Robinson (Olympiacos Piraeus): 16.4
9. Andrea Meneghin (Varese Roosters): 16.1
10. Gordan Giriček (Cibona Zagreb): 15.9
11. Carlton Myers (PAF Bologna): 15.7
12. Alberto Herreros (Real Madrid): 15.5

Rebounds per game:

1. Hüseyin Beşok (Efes Pilsen Istanbul): 10.0
2. Nate Huffman (Maccabi Tel Aviv): 9.3
3. Rashard Griffith (TOFAS Bursa): 9.1
4. Victor Alexander (PAOK Thessaloniki): 8.5
5. Dejan Tomašević (Buducnost Podgorica): 8.4
6. Dragan Tarlać (Olympiacos Piraeus): 7.7
7. Nikola Prkačin (Cibona Zagreb): 7.6
8. Roberto Dueñas (FC Barcelona): 7.5
9. Marlon Maxey (ASVEL Villeurbanne): 7.2
10. Éric Struelens (Real Madrid): 7.1
11. Ioannis Giannoulis (PAOK Thessaloniki): 6.6
12. Stojan Vranković (PAF Bologna): 6.5

Assists per game:

1. David Rivers (TOFAS Bursa): 4.93
2. Šarūnas Jasikevičius (Union Olimpija Ljubljana): 4.90
3. Damir Mulaomerović (Efes Pilsen Istanbul): 4.6
4. Moustapha Sonko (ASVEL Villeurbanne): 4.4
5. Aleksandar Đorđević (Real Madrid): 4.2
6. Vasily Karasev (CSKA Moscow): 4.1
7. Henrik Rödl (Alba Berlin): 3.8
8. Mindaugas Timinskas (Žalgiris Kaunas): 3.75
9. Ariel McDonald (Maccabi Tel Aviv): 3.70
10. Gianmarco Pozzecco (Varese Roosters): 3.6
11. Riccardo Pittis (Benetton Treviso): 3.6
12. Dragan Lukovski (Crvena Zvezda Belgrade): 3.5

Steals per game:

1. Andrea Meneghin (Varese Roosters): 2.9
2. Marko Milič (Union Olimpija Ljubljana): 2.59
3. Andrei Kirilenko (CSKA Moscow): 2.52
4. Andre Turner (Caja San Fernando Sevilla): 2.4
5. Steven Rogers (TOFAS Bursa): 2.37
6. Nikola Prkačin (Cibona Zagreb): 2.33
7. Henrik Rödl (Alba Berlin): 2.33

=== 2000–01 FIBA SuproLeague ===
Points per game:

1. Miroslav Berić (Partizan Belgrade): 23.2
2. Carl Thomas (Plannja Luleå): 22.3
3. John Best (TSV Bayer 04 Leverkusen): 22.2
4. Bill Edwards (ASVEL Villeurbanne): 19.9
5. J. R. Holden (Telindus Oostende): 19.5
6. Nikos Chatzivrettas (Iraklis Thessaloniki): 19.3
7. Damir Mulaomerović (Efes Pilsen Istanbul): 19.0
8. DeMarco Johnson (Scavolini Pesaro): 18.8
9. Dejan Bodiroga (Panathinaikos Athens): 17.7
10. Nate Huffman (Maccabi Tel Aviv): 17.5
11. Adam Wójcik (Śląsk Wrocław): 17.2
12. Predrag Drobnjak (Efes Pilsen Istanbul): 16.6

Rebounds per game:

1. Roberto Chiacig (Montepaschi Siena): 9.3
2. Andrei Kirilenko (CSKA Moscow): 9.2
3. Nate Huffman (Maccabi Tel Aviv): 9
4. Lazaros Papadopoulos (Iraklis Thessaloniki): 9
5. Virginijus Praškevičius (Telindus Oostende): 8.9
6. Dejan Koturović (Alba Berlin): 8.5
7. Hüseyin Beşok (Efes Pilsen Istanbul): 8.3
8. Robertas Javtokas (Lietuvos Rytas Vilnius): 8.2
9. Ben Handlogten (Ulker Istanbul): 7.9
10. Joseph McNaull (Śląsk Wrocław): 7.6
11. Yohance Nicholas (Plannja Luleå): 7.4
12. DeMarco Johnson (Scavolini Pesaro): 7.3

Assists per game:

1. Raimonds Miglinieks (Śląsk Wrocław): 6.9
2. Laurent Sciarra (ASVEL Villeurbanne): 6.1
3. Chuck Evans (TSV Bayer 04 Leverkusen): 5.3
4. Damir Mulaomerović (Efes Pilsen Istanbul): 4.9
5. Eric Elliott (Lietuvos Rytas Vilnius): 4.1
6. J. R. Holden (Telindus Oostende): 3.75
7. Branko Milisavljević (Partizan Belgrade): 3.73
8. Derrick Phelps (Alba Berlin): 3.65
9. Andrius Giedraitis (Lietuvos Rytas Vilnius): 3.6
10. Ariel McDonald (Maccabi Tel Aviv): 3.5
11. Miroslav Berić (Partizan Belgrade): 3.4
12. Melvin Booker (Scavolini Pesaro): 3.3

Steals per game:

1. Ralph Biggs (Telindus Oostende): 2.1
2. Derrick Phelps (Alba Berlin): 2.0
3. Andrei Kirilenko (CSKA Moscow): 1.954
4. Veselin Petrović (Partizan Belgrade): 1.952
5. Terrence Rencher (Croatia Osiguranje Split): 1.86
6. Carl Thomas (Plannja Luleå): 1.84

Blocks per game:

1. Andrei Kirilenko (CSKA Moscow): 2.1
2. Andrei Fetisov (CSKA Moscow): 1.58
3. Dejan Koturović (Alba Berlin): 1.52
4. Jason Lawson (EB Pau Orthez): 1.3
5. Robertas Javtokas (Lietuvos Rytas Vilnius): 1.2
6. Ben Handlogten (Ulker Istanbul): 1.0

=== 2000–01 EuroLeague Basketball ===
Points per game:

1. Alphonso Ford (Peristeri Athens): 26.00
2. Dejan Tomašević (Buducnost Podgorica): 22.92
3. Panagiotis Liadelis (PAOK Thessaloniki): 22.69
4. Louis Bullock (Müller Verona): 22.00
5. Derrick Hamilton (St. Petersburg Lions): 21.80
6. Jemeil Rich (Lugano Snakes): 21.50
7. Sani Bečirovič (Union Olimpija Ljubljana): 20.67
8. Gregor Fučka (PAF Bologna): 19.71
9. Kris Hill (Ovarense Aerosoles): 17.20
10. Mike Batiste (Spirou Basket): 16.10
11. Petar Naumoski (Benetton Basket): 15.86
12. Alphonso Reyes (Adecco Estudiantes): 15.83

Rebounds per game:

1. Dejan Tomašević (Buducnost Podgorica): 11.50
2. Dino Rađa (Olympiacos Piraeus): 9.79
3. Ronald Ellis (Spirou Charleroi): 9.60
4. Mike Batiste (Spirou Charleroi): 9.20
5. Rashard Griffith (Kinder Bologna): 8.71
6. Gregor Fučka (PAF Bologna): 8.41
7. Emilio Kovačić (Union Olimpija Ljubljana): 8.21
8. Davor Pejčinović (KK Zadar): 7.90
9. Derrick Hamilton (St. Petersburg Lions): 7.70
10. Kris Hill (Ovarense Aerosoles): 7.60
11. Mate Skelin (Cibona VIP): 7.45
12. Fabricio Oberto (Tau Ceramica): 7.36

Assists per game:

1. Ivica Marić (KK Zadar): 5.90
2. Elmer Bennett (TAU Ceramica Vitoria): 5.45
3. Riccardo Pittis (Benetton Treviso): 3.77
4. Tyron McCoy (Opel Frankfurt Skyliners): 3.70
5. Byron Dinkins (Peristeri Athens): 3.58
6. Sani Bečirovič (Union Olimpija Ljubljana): 3.53
7. Raül López (Real Madrid): 3.25
8. Louis Bullock (Müller Verona): 3.18
9. Dejan Tomašević (Buducnost Podgorica): 3.08
10. Angelos Koronios (PAOK Thessaloniki): 2.91
11. Gonzalo Martínez (Adecco Estudiantes): 2.90
12. Steve Woodberry (Zalgiris): 2.83

Steals per game:

1. Jemeil Rich (Lugano Snakes): 3.70
2. Ivica Marić (KK Zadar): 3.70
3. Riccardo Pittis (Benetton Treviso): 3.38
4. Manu Ginóbili (Kinder Bologna): 2.91
5. Derrick Hamilton (St. Petersburg Lions): 2.30
6. Gregor Fučka (PAF Bologna): 2.29

Blocks per game:

1. Grigorij Khizhnyak (Žalgiris Kaunas): 3.17
2. Stojan Vranković (PAF Bologna): 2.60
3. Davor Pejčinović (KK Zadar): 2.50
4. Dino Rađa (Olympiacos Piraeus): 1.43
5. Éric Struelens (Real Madrid): 1.36
6. Rashard Griffith (Kinder Bologna): 1.29

Average Index Rating:

1. Dejan Tomašević (Buducnost Podgorica): 30.92
2. Derrick Hamilton (St. Petersburg Lions): 28.30
3. Alphonso Ford (Peristeri Athens): 25.42
4. Gregor Fučka (PAF Bologna): 25.24
5. Louis Bullock (Müller Verona): 22.91
6. Panagiotis Liadelis (PAOK Thessaloniki): 21.38
7. Dino Rađa (Olympiacos Piraeus): 20.29
8. Sani Bečirovič (Union Olimpija Ljubljana): 20.13
9. Rashard Griffith (Kinder Bologna): 19.76
10. Kris Hill (Ovarense Aerosoles): 19.20
11. Grygorii Khiznhiak (Zalgiris): 18.83
12. Jameil Rich (Lugano Snakes): 18.30

=== 2001–02 ===
Points per game:

1. Alphonso Ford (Olympiacos Piraeus): 24.75
2. Gordan Giriček (CSKA Moscow): 22.94
3. Jaka Lakovič (Krka Novo Mesto): 20.93
4. Dejan Bodiroga (Panathinaikos Athens): 20.05
5. Vlado Šćepanović (Partizan Belgrade): 19.71
6. Gregor Fučka (Skipper Bologna): 19.05
7. Ruslan Avleev (Ural Great Perm): 18.60
8. Adam Wójcik (Peristeri Athens): 18.36
9. Marcus Goree (Opel Frankfurt Skyliners): 18.07
10. Tyus Edney (Benetton Treviso): 17.95
11. Igor Rakočević (Buducnost Podgorica): 17.71
12. Mirsad Türkcan (CSKA Moscow): 17.65

Rebounds per game:

1. Mirsad Türkcan (CSKA Moscow): 12.76
2. Joseph Blair (Scavolini Pesaro): 11.93
3. Mate Skelin (Krka Novo Mesto): 9.79
4. Quadre Lollis (Ulker Istanbul): 8.50
5. Michalis Kakiouzis (AEK Athens): 8.25
6. Gregor Fučka (Skipper Bologna): 8.20
7. Jovo Stanojević (Partizan ICN Belgrade): 8.14
8. Grigorij Khizhnyak (Žalgiris Kaunas): 8.07
9. Marcus Goree (Opel Frankfurt Skyliners): 8.07
10. Dejan Tomašević (TAU Ceramica Vitoria): 7.60
11. Nate Huffman (Maccabi Tel Aviv): 7.40
12. Dimos Dikoudis (AEK Athens): 7.05

Assists per game:

1. Elmer Bennett (TAU Ceramica Vitoria): 5.27
2. Michael Hawkins (Idea Śląsk Wrocław): 5.00
3. John Celestand (Adecco ASVEL Villeurbanne): 4.77
4. Derrick Phelps (Alba Berlin): 4.08
5. Theo Papaloukas (Olympiacos Piraeus): 4.00
6. Ariel McDonald (Maccabi Tel Aviv): 3.80
7. Tyus Edney (Benetton Treviso): 3.789
8. Jaka Lakovič (Krka Novo Mesto): 3.785
9. Melvin Booker (Scavolini Pesaro): 3.75
10. Dragan Lukovski (EB Pau Orthez): 3.57
11. Curtis McCants (CSKA Moscow): 3.42
12. Šarūnas Jasikevičius (FC Barcelona): 3.39

Steals per game:

1. Manu Ginóbili (Kinder Bologna): 2.55
2. Roger Huggins (Spirou Charleroi): 2.29
3. Marko Jarić (Kinder Bologna): 2.238
4. Derrick Phelps (Alba Berlin): 2.230
5. Ralph Biggs (Telindus Oostende): 2.14
6. Tyus Edney (Benetton Treviso): 2.11

Blocks per game:

1. Grigorij Khizhnyak (Žalgiris Kaunas): 3.21
2. Mikhail Mikhailov (Ural Great Perm): 1.63
3. Marcus Goree (Opel Frankfurt Skyliners): 1.50
4. Éric Struelens (Real Madrid): 1.44
5. Mirsad Türkcan (CSKA Moscow): 1.24
6. Frédéric Weis (Unicaja): 1.14

Average Index Rating:

1. Mirsad Türkcan (CSKA Moscow): 25.82
2. Joseph Blair (Scavolini Pesaro): 25.14
3. Mate Skelin (Krka Novo Mesto): 25.07
4. Alphonso Ford (Olympiacos Piraeus): 23.45
5. Dejan Bodiroga (Panathinaikos Athens): 23.14
6. Ruslan Avleev (Ural Great Perm): 22.60
7. Jaka Lakovič (Krka Novo Mesto): 22.43
8. Ralph Biggs (Telindus Oostende): 21.64
9. Grigorij Khizhnyak (Žalgiris Kaunas): 21.57
10. Gregor Fučka (Skipper Bologna): 21.40
11. Marcus Goree (Opel Frankfurt Skyliners): 21.07
12. Gordan Giriček (CSKA Moscow): 20.56

=== 2002–03 ===
Points per game:

1. Miloš Vujanić (Partizan Mobtel Belgrade): 25.79
2. Marcus Brown (Efes Pilsen Istanbul): 19.63
3. Alphonso Ford (Montepaschi Siena): 17.86
4. Nikola Vujčić (Maccabi Tel Aviv): 17.60
5. Kaspars Kambala (Efes Pilsen Istanbul): 17.10
6. Kornél Dávid (Žalgiris Kaunas): 16.92
7. Andrés Nocioni (TAU Ceramica Vitoria): 16.84
8. Rod Sellers (EB Pau Orthez): 16.64
9. Victor Alexander (CSKA Moscow): 16.60
10. Melvin Booker (Ulker Istanbul): 16.55
11. Tyus Edney (Benetton Treviso): 16.50
12. Dejan Bodiroga (FC Barcelona): 16.09

Rebounds per game:

1. Mirsad Türkcan (Montepaschi Siena): 11.81
2. Joseph Blair (Ulker Istanbul): 9.67
3. Quadre Lollis (Alba Berlin): 9.50
4. Kornél Dávid (Žalgiris Kaunas): 8.23
5. Kaspars Kambala (Efes Pilsen Istanbul): 7.85
6. Andrés Nocioni (TAU Ceramica Vitoria): 7.58
7. Ademola Okulaja (Unicaja Málaga): 7.53
8. Nikola Vujčić (Maccabi Tel Aviv): 7.10
9. Carlos Delfino (Skipper Bologna): 7.06
10. Vasco Evtimov (Adecco ASVEL Villeurbanne): 7.05
11. Denis Marconato (Benetton Treviso): 7.00
12. DeMarco Johnson (Olympiacos Piraeus): 6.80

Assists per game:

1. Ed Cota (Žalgiris Kaunas): 6.50
2. Dragan Lukovski (EB Pau Orthez): 4.57
3. Gianmarco Pozzecco (Skipper Bologna): 4.56
4. Jon Robert Holden (CSKA Moscow): 4.41
5. Tyus Edney (Benetton Treviso): 4.33
6. Riccardo Pittis (Benetton Treviso): 4.09
7. Melvin Booker (Ulker Istanbul): 4.00
8. Stevin Smith (Adecco ASVEL Villeurbanne): 3.75
9. Vrbica Stefanov (Montepaschi Siena): 3.63
10. Jerome Allen (TAU Ceramica Vitoria): 3.50
11. Gianluca Basile (Skipper Bologna): 3.42
12. Lucas Victoriano (Real Madrid): 3.38

Steals per game:

1. Jorge Garbajosa (Benetton Treviso): 2.27
2. Riccardo Pittis (Benetton Treviso): 2.27
3. Mirsad Türkcan (Montepaschi Siena): 2.14
4. Nikola Prkačin (Cibona VIP Zagreb): 2.05
5. Alphonso Ford (Montepaschi Siena): 2.00
6. Ariel McDonald (Panathinaikos): 1.94

Blocks per game:

1. Eduardo Hernández-Sonseca (Real Madrid): 1.50
2. Dejan Koturović (Virtus Bologna): 1.39
3. Chuck Kornegay (Unicaja Málaga): 1.35
4. Victor Khryapa (CSKA Moscow): 1.32
5. Rashard Griffith (TAU Ceramica Vitoria): 1.23
6. Slavko Vraneš (Buducnost Podgorica): 1.21

Average Index Rating:

1. Mirsad Türkcan (Montepaschi Siena): 24.00
2. Miloš Vujanić (Partizan Mobtel Belgrade): 24.00
3. Joseph Blair (Ulker Istanbul): 23.72
4. Kornél Dávid (Žalgiris Kaunas): 21.77
5. Marcus Brown (Efes Pilsen Istanbul): 21.42
6. Quadre Lollis (Alba Berlin): 21.25
7. Nikola Vujčić (Maccabi Tel Aviv): 21.20
8. Kaspars Kambala (Efes Pilsen Istanbul): 19.30
9. Jorge Garbajosa (Benetton Treviso): 19.27
10. Dejan Bodiroga (FC Barcelona): 18.91
11. Tyus Edney (Benetton Treviso): 18.22
12. Andrés Nocioni (TAU Ceramica Vitoria): 18.00

=== 2003–04 ===
Points per game:

1. Lynn Greer (Idea Śląsk Wrocław): 25.07
2. Horace Jenkins (AEK Athens): 20.08
3. Arvydas Macijauskas (TAU Ceramica Vitoria): 19.45
4. Marcus Brown (CSKA Moscow): 18.71
5. Maurice Evans (Benetton Treviso): 17.40
6. Panagiotis Liadelis (Olympiacos Piraeus): 16.95
7. Nikola Vujčić (Maccabi Tel Aviv): 16.81
8. Arvydas Sabonis (Žalgiris Kaunas): 16.67
9. DeJuan Collins (Alba Berlin): 16.64
10. Miloš Vujanić (Skipper Bologna): 16.30
11. Vlantimir Stergiou (Alba Berlin): 16.17
12. Anthony Parker (Maccabi Tel Aviv): 16.00

Rebounds per game:

1. Arvydas Sabonis (Žalgiris Kaunas): 10.72
2. Mirsad Türkcan (CSKA Moscow): 10.45
3. Quadre Lollis (AEK Athens): 9.75
4. Joseph Blair (Ulker Istanbul): 9.59
5. Dejan Tomašević (Pamesa Valencia): 8.71
6. Maceo Baston (Maccabi Tel Aviv): 8.10
7. Denis Marconato (Benetton Treviso): 7.89
8. Márton Báder (Krka Novo Mesto): 7.62
9. Tanoka Beard (Žalgiris Kaunas): 7.60
10. Rashard Griffith (Lottomatica Roma): 7.21
11. Đuro Ostojić (Partizan Mobtel Belgrade): 7.21
12. Nikola Vujčić (Maccabi Tel Aviv): 6.90

Assists per game:

1. Ed Cota (Žalgiris Kaunas): 5.65
2. Lynn Greer (Idea Śląsk Wrocław): 5.50
3. Šarūnas Jasikevičius (Maccabi Tel Aviv): 4.76
4. Tyus Edney (Benetton Treviso): 4.56
5. Gianmarco Pozzecco (Skipper Bologna): 4.55
6. Dragan Lukovski (EB Pau Orthez): 4.42
7. Marcus Brown (CSKA Moscow): 4.24
8. Pablo Prigioni (TAU Ceramica Vitoria): 4.05
9. Dejan Tomašević (Pamesa Valencia): 3.88
10. J. R. Holden (CSKA Moscow): 3.77
11. Ender Arslan (Efes Pilsen Istanbul): 3.75
12. Riccardo Pittis (Benetton Basket): 3.74

Steals per game:

1. Fred House (Partizan Mobtel Belgrade): 3.38
2. David Vanterpool (Montepaschi Siena): 2.41
3. Scoonie Penn (Cibona VIP Zagreb): 2.31
4. Dejan Tomašević (Pamesa Valencia): 2.12
5. Massimo Bulleri (Benetton Treviso): 2.08
6. Ariel McDonald (Panathinaikos Athens): 1.90
7. Pablo Prigioni (TAU Ceramica Vitoria): 1.90

Blocks per game:

1. Arvydas Sabonis (Žalgiris Kaunas): 1.61
2. Maceo Baston (Maccabi Tel Aviv): 1.43
3. Denis Marconato (Benetton Treviso): 1.26
4. Adam Wójcik (Idea Śląsk Wrocław): 1.21
5. Patrick Femerling (FC Barcelona): 1.05
6. Victor Khryapa (CSKA Moscow): 1.00

Average Index Rating:

1. Arvydas Sabonis (Žalgiris Kaunas): 26.28
2. Lynn Greer (Idea Śląsk Wrocław): 24.29
3. Anthony Parker (Maccabi Tel Aviv): 22.24
4. Marcus Brown (CSKA Moscow): 21.57
5. Arvydas Macijauskas (TAU Ceramica Vitoria): 20.40
6. Nikola Vujčić (Maccabi Tel Aviv): 20.00
7. Joseph Blair (Ulker Istanbul): 19.47
8. Horace Jenkins (AEK Athens): 19.33
9. Dejan Tomašević (Pamesa Valencia): 18.88
10. Jorge Garbajosa (Benetton Treviso): 18.06
11. Quadre Lollis (AEK Athens): 18.00
12. Đuro Ostojić (Partizan Mobtel Belgrade): 17.86

=== 2004–05 ===
Points per game:

1. Charles Smith (Scavolini Pesaro): 20.65
2. Chris Williams (Opel Frankfurt Skyliners): 18.93
3. Tanoka Beard (Žalgiris Kaunas): 18.00
4. Anthony Parker (Maccabi Tel Aviv): 17.96
5. Arvydas Macijauskas (TAU Ceramica Vitoria): 17.86
6. Robert Pack (Žalgiris Kaunas): 17.31
7. Louis Bullock (Real Madrid): 17.11
8. Serkan Erdoğan (Ulker Istanbul): 16.68
9. Miloš Vujanić (Climamio Bologna): 16.55
10. Mire Chatman (EB Pau Orthez): 16.36
11. Marcus Brown (CSKA Moscow): 15.96
12. Vladimir Boisa (Union Olimpija Ljubljana): 15.79

Rebounds per game:

1. Tanoka Beard (Žalgiris Kaunas): 10.60
2. Rubén Garcés (Adecco Estudiantes Madrid): 8.71
3. Hüseyin Beşok (Adecco ASVEL Villeurbanne): 8.00
4. Jorge Garbajosa (Unicaja Málaga): 7.85
5. Felipe Reyes (Real Madrid): 7.71
6. Stephane Pelle (Adecco ASVEL Villeurbanne): 7.29
7. Denis Marconato (Benetton Treviso): 7.23
8. Kerem Gönlüm (Ulker Istanbul): 7.18
9. David Andersen (CSKA Moscow): 7.00
10. Eurelijus Žukauskas (Ulker Istanbul): 7.00
11. Chris Williams (Opel Frankfurt Skyliners): 6.86
12. Andrija Zizić (Cibona Zagreb/Winterthur FC Barcelona): 6.80

Assists per game:

1. Mire Chatman (EB Pau Orthez): 6.21
2. Šarūnas Jasikevičius (Maccabi Tel Aviv): 5.33
3. Nikos Zisis (AEK Athens): 4.40
4. Tomas Pačėsas (Prokom Trefl Sopot): 4.05
5. Marko Popović (Cibona VIP Zagreb): 4.00
6. Scoonie Penn (Scavolini Pesaro): 3.86
7. Theo Papaloukas (CSKA Moscow): 3.83
8. Kerem Tunçeri (Ulker Istanbul): 3.64
9. Anthony Parker (Maccabi Tel Aviv): 3.58
10. David Vanterpool (Montepaschi Siena): 3.578
11. Pascal Roller (Opel Frankfurt Skyliners): 3.57
12. Robert Pack (Zalgiris): 3.44

Steals per game:

1. Chris Williams (Opel Frankfurt Skyliners): 2.79
2. Charles Smith (Scavolini Pesaro): 2.50
3. David Vanterpool (Montepaschi Siena): 2.16
4. Sašo Ožbolt (Union Olimpija Ljubljana): 2.14
5. Scoonie Penn (Scavolini Pesaro): 2.14
6. Will Solomon (Efes Pilsen): 2.04

Blocks per game:

1. Eurelijus Žukauskas (Ulker Istanbul): 1.82
2. Maceo Baston (Maccabi Tel Aviv): 1.54
3. Fran Vázquez (Unicaja Málaga): 1.50
4. Darjuš Lavrinovič (Žalgiris Kaunas): 1.36
5. Thierry Rupert (EB Pau Orthez): 1.36
6. Denis Marconato (Benetton Treviso): 1.05

Average Index Rating:

1. Anthony Parker (Maccabi Tel Aviv): 24.88
2. Tanoka Beard (Žalgiris Kaunas): 21.95
3. Chris Williams (Opel Frankfurt Skyliners): 21.50
4. Jorge Garbajosa (Unicaja Málaga): 21.23
5. Mire Chatman (EB Pau Orthez): 18.86
6. Maceo Baston (Maccabi Tel Aviv): 18.71
7. Charles Smith (Scavolini Pesaro): 18.30
8. Arvydas Macijauskas (TAU Ceramica Vitoria): 18.27
9. Nikola Vujčić (Maccabi Tel Aviv): 17.90
10. David Andersen (CSKA Moscow): 17.74
11. Rubén Garcés (Adecco Estudiantes Madrid): 17.29
12. Luis Scola (Tau Ceramica): 16.88

=== 2005–06 ===
Points per game:

1. Drew Nicholas (Benetton Treviso): 18.45
2. Scoonie Penn (Cibona VIP Zagreb): 17.05
3. Louis Bullock (Real Madrid): 15.80
4. Marcus Brown (Unicaja Málaga): 15.30
5. Rimantas Kaukėnas (Montepaschi Siena): 15.14
6. Juan Carlos Navarro (Winterthur FC Barcelona): 15.14
7. Goran Jagodnik (Prokom Trefl Sopot): 15.07
8. Will Solomon (Maccabi Tel Aviv): 15.00
9. Jorge Garbajosa (Unicaja Málaga): 14.89
10. Anthony Parker (Maccabi Tel Aviv): 14.84
11. Igor Rakočević (Real Madrid): 14.8
12. Luis Scola (Tau Ceramica): 14.76

Rebounds per game:

1. Mirsad Türkcan (Ulker Istanbul): 8.94
2. Darjuš Lavrinovič (Žalgiris Kaunas): 8.30
3. Robertas Javtokas (Lietuvos Rytas Vilnius): 8.20
4. Tanoka Beard (Žalgiris Kaunas): 8.07
5. Spencer Nelson (GHP Bamberg): 7.95
6. Felipe Reyes (Real Madrid): 7.55
7. Travis Watson (Climamio Bologna): 7.35
8. Jorge Garbajosa (Unicaja Málaga): 6.94
9. Anthony Parker (Maccabi Tel Aviv): 6.88
10. Paulius Jankūnas (Zalgiris): 6.80
11. K'Zell Wesson (Strasbourg): 6.71
12. Luis Scola (Tau Ceramica): 6.68

Assists per game:

1. Pablo Prigioni (TAU Ceramica Vitoria): 6.24
2. Tyus Edney (Olympiacos Piraeus): 4.48
3. Shammond Williams (Winterthur FC Barcelona): 4.28
4. Lonnie Cooper (EB Pau Orthez): 4.21
5. Theo Papaloukas (CSKA Moscow): 4.04
6. Nikola Vujčić (Maccabi Tel Aviv): 3.92
7. Anthony Parker (Maccabi Tel Aviv): 3.76
8. Yotam Halperin (Union Olimpija Ljubljana): 3.57
9. Aymeric Jeanneau (SIG Basket Strasbourg): 3.43
10. Roberts Štelmahers (Lietuvos Rytas Vilnius): 3.38
11. Pepe Sánchez (Unicaja Málaga): 3.17
12. Christian Dalmau (Prokom Trefl Sopot): 3.15

Steals per game:

1. Jeff Trepagnier (Ulker Istanbul): 3.05
2. Ricardo Greer (SIG Basket Strasbourg): 2.43
3. Nate Green (Climamio Bologna): 2.33
4. Dimitris Diamantidis (Panathinaikos Athens): 2.30
5. Yotam Halperin (Union Olimpija Ljubljana): 2.21
6. Pablo Prigioni (Tau Ceramica): 2.20
7. Scoonie Penn (Cibona VIP): 2.20

Blocks per game:

1. Darjuš Lavrinovič (Žalgiris Kaunas): 2.10
2. Robertas Javtokas (Lietuvos Rytas Vilnius): 1.95
3. Venson Hamilton (Real Madrid): 1.68
4. Marcus Haislip (Ulker Istanbul): 1.59
5. Marcus Goree (Benetton Treviso): 1.40
6. Maceo Baston (Maccabi Tel Aviv): 1.32

Average Index Rating:

1. Anthony Parker (Maccabi Tel Aviv): 20.52
2. Jorge Garbajosa (Unicaja Málaga): 19.33
3. Luis Scola (TAU Ceramica Vitoria): 18.80
4. Darjuš Lavrinovič (Žalgiris Kaunas): 18.70
5. Mirsad Türkcan (Ulker Istanbul): 17.25
6. Mike Batiste (Panathinaikos Athens): 17.09
7. Scoonie Penn (Cibona VIP Zagreb): 16.95
8. Drew Nicholas (Benetton Treviso): 16.65
9. Ricardo Greer (SIG Basket Strasbourg): 16.36
10. Maceo Baston (Maccabi Tel Aviv): 15.60
11. Vassilis Spanoulis (Panathinaikos): 15.52
12. Yotam Halperin (Union Olimpija): 15.43

=== 2006–07 ===
Points per game:

1. Juan Carlos Navarro (Winterthur FC Barcelona): 16.77
2. Igor Rakočević (TAU Ceramica Vitoria): 16.23
3. David Blu (Climamio Bologna): 16.00
4. Kaspars Kambala (Fenerbahçe Ülker İstanbul): 15.85
5. Rudy Fernández (DKV Joventut Badalona): 15.79
6. Predrag Drobnjak (Partizan Belgrade): 15.70
7. Luis Scola (TAU Ceramica Vitoria): 15.52
8. Alex Scales (Aris TT Bank Thessaloniki): 15.11
9. Michael Wright (EB Pau Orthez): 15.10
10. Kenny Gregory (Le Mans Sarthe Basket): 14.93
11. Nikola Vujčić (Maccabi Tel Aviv): 14.91

Rebounds per game:

1. Tanoka Beard (Žalgiris Kaunas): 9.86
2. James Thomas (Climamio Bologna): 9.85
3. Brent Wright (Cibona VIP Zagreb): 8.00
4. Nikola Vujčić (Maccabi Tel Aviv): 7.59
5. Jeremiah Massey (Aris TT Bank Thessaloniki): 7.40
6. Lazaros Papadopoulos (Dynamo Moscow): 7.24
7. Eric Campbell (Le Mans Sarthe Basket): 7.07
8. Antonis Fotsis (Dynamo Moscow): 7.05
9. Paulius Jankūnas (Žalgiris Kaunas): 7.00
10. Mason Rocca (Eldo Napoli): 6.92

Assists per game:

1. Theo Papaloukas (CSKA Moscow): 5.40
2. Pablo Prigioni (TAU Ceramica Vitoria): 4.70
3. Nikos Zisis (Benetton Treviso): 4.30
4. Dimitris Diamantidis (Panathinaikos Athens): 3.92
5. Nikola Vujčić (Maccabi Tel Aviv): 3.86
6. Drew Nicholas (Efes Pilsen Istanbul): 3.80
7. Zoran Planinić (TAU Ceramica Vitoria): 3.78
8. Tyson Wheeler (Le Mans Sarthe Basket): 3.77
9. Aaron Miles (EB Pau Orthez): 3.70
10. Jaka Lakovič (Winterthur FC Barcelona): 3.52

Steals per game:

1. Ricky Rubio (DKV Joventut Badalona): 3.19
2. Stefano Mancinelli (Climamio Bologna): 2.62
3. Mire Chatman (Lottomatica Roma): 2.53
4. Pablo Prigioni (TAU Ceramica Vitoria): 2.48
5. Jonas Mačiulis (Žalgiris Kaunas): 2.43
6. David Hawkins (Lottomatica Roma): 2.35

Blocks per game:

1. Marcus Haislip (Efes Pilsen Istanbul): 1.75
2. Tomas Van Den Spiegel (CSKA Moscow): 1.29
3. Sandro Nicević (Le Mans Sarthe Basket): 1.29
4. Fran Vázquez (Winterthur FC Barcelona): 1.17
5. Kosta Perović (Partizan Belgrade): 1.15

Average Index Rating:

1. Nikola Vujčić (Maccabi Tel Aviv): 21.73
2. Lazaros Papadopoulos (Dynamo Moscow): 20.29
3. Eric Campbell (Le Mans Sarthe Basket): 19.00
4. Jeremiah Massey (Aris TT Bank Thessaloniki): 18.30
5. Tanoka Beard (Žalgiris Kaunas): 18.29
6. Luis Scola (TAU Ceramica Vitoria): 17.91
7. Predrag Drobnjak (Partizan Belgrade): 17.70
8. Antonis Fotsis (Dynamo Moscow): 17.23
9. Michael Wright (EB Pau Orthez): 17.00
10. Juan Carlos Navarro (Winterthur FC Barcelona): 16.86
11. Brent Wright (Cibona VIP Zagreb): 16.86
12. Kaspars Kambala (Fenerbahçe Ülker İstanbul): 16.85

=== 2007–08 ===
Points per game:

1. Marc Salyers (Chorale Roanne): 21.79
2. Will Solomon (Fenerbahçe Ülker İstanbul): 17.90
3. Jeremiah Massey (Aris TT Bank Thessaloniki): 17.00
4. Hollis Price (Lietuvos Rytas Vilnius): 16.85
5. Drew Nicholas (Efes Pilsen Istanbul): 16.50
6. Nikola Peković (Partizan Igokea Belgrade): 16.43
7. Lynn Greer (Olympiacos Piraeus): 16.26
8. Marko Milič (Union Olimpija Ljubljana): 15.64
9. Chris Warren (Cibona VIP Zagreb): 15.64
10. Brion Rush (Chorale Roanne): 15.43

Rebounds per game:

1. Travis Watson (Armani Jeans Milano): 9.71
2. Jeremiah Massey (Aris TT Bank Thessaloniki): 8.45
3. Terence Morris (Maccabi Tel Aviv): 8.32
4. Sam Clancy (Le Mans Sarthe Basket): 7.31
5. Felipe Reyes (Real Madrid): 7.11
6. Nikola Peković (Partizan Igokea Belgrade): 6.87
7. Novica Veličković (Partizan Igokea Belgrade): 6.8
8. Marc Salyers (Chorale Roanne): 6.57
9. Loren Woods (Efes Pilsen Istanbul): 6.50
10. Ademola Okulaja (Brose Baskets Bamberg): 6.46
11. Marko Milič (Union Olimpija Ljubljana). 6.36

Assists per game:

1. DeJuan Collins (Žalgiris Kaunas): 5.35
2. Terrell McIntyre (Montepaschi Siena): 4.92
3. Theo Papaloukas (CSKA Moscow): 4.57
4. Marc-Antoine Pellin (Chorale Roanne): 4.50
5. Raviv Limonad (Le Mans Sarthe Basket): 4.14
6. Pablo Prigioni (TAU Ceramica Vitoria): 4.12
7. Yotam Halperin (Maccabi Tel Aviv): 3.96
8. Will Solomon (Fenerbahçe Ülker İstanbul): 3.90
9. Hollis Price (Lietuvos Rytas Vilnius): 3.90
10. Lynn Greer (Olympiacos Piraeus): 3.63
11. Pepe Sánchez (AXA FC Barcelona): 3.57
12. Dimitris Diamantidis (Panathinaikos Athens): 3.26

Steals per game:

1. Shaun Stonerook (Montepaschi Siena): 2.58
2. Terrell McIntyre (Montepaschi Siena): 2.46
3. David Hawkins (Lottomatica Roma): 2.35
4. Chuck Eidson (Lietuvos Rytas Vilnius): 2.17
5. Travis Watson (Armani Jeans Milano): 1.86
6. Brion Rush (Chorale Roanne): 1.86

Blocks per game:

1. Ömer Aşık (Fenerbahçe Ülker İstanbul): 2.07
2. Terence Morris (Maccabi Tel Aviv): 1.76
3. Eurelijus Žukauskas (Žalgiris Kaunas): 1.42
4. Boniface N'Dong (Unicaja Málaga): 1.42
5. Loren Woods (Efes Pilsen Istanbul): 1.38
6. Ioannis Bourousis (Olympiacos Piraeus): 1.24

Average Index Rating:

1. Marc Salyers (Chorale Roanne): 22.50
2. Jeremiah Massey (Aris TT Bank Thessaloniki): 21.00
3. Nikola Peković (Partizan Igokea Belgrade): 19.61
4. Lynn Greer (Olympiacos Piraeus): 18.05
5. Will Solomon (Fenerbahçe Ülker İstanbul): 18.00
6. Travis Watson (Armani Jeans Milano): 18.00
7. Terence Morris (Maccabi Tel Aviv): 17.76
8. Marc Jackson (Olympiacos Piraeus): 16.80
9. Sam Clancy (Le Mans Sarthe Basket): 16.54
10. Chris Warren (Cibona VIP Zagreb): 16.29

=== 2008–09 ===
Points per game:

1. Igor Rakočević (TAU Ceramica Vitoria) 17.95
2. Terrell McIntyre (Montepaschi Siena) 17.26
3. David Logan (Asseco Prokom Sopot) 16.87
4. Mirsad Türkcan (Fenerbahçe Ülker İstanbul) 15.36
5. D'or Fischer (Maccabi Tel Aviv) 14.85
6. Rimantas Kaukėnas (Montepaschi Siena) 14.78
7. Sani Bečirovič (Virtus Lottomatica Roma) 14.77
8. Juan Carlos Navarro (Regal FC Barcelona) 14.71
9. Carlos Arroyo (Maccabi Tel Aviv) 14.6
10. Tiago Splitter (TAU Ceramica Vitoria) 14.00
11. Lior Eliyahu (Maccabi Tel Aviv) 14.00

Rebounds per game:

1. Mirsad Türkcan (Fenerbahçe Ülker İstanbul) 8.64
2. D'or Fischer (Maccabi Tel Aviv) 7.62
3. Ioannis Bourousis (Olympiacos Piraeus) 7.36
4. Ersan İlyasova (Regal FC Barcelona) 7.00
5. Pat Burke (Asseco Prokom Sopot) 6.87
6. Stéphane Lasme (Partizan Belgrade) 6.58
7. Lior Eliyahu (Maccabi Tel Aviv) 6.56
8. Felipe Reyes (Real Madrid) 6.50
9. Kšyštof Lavrinovič (Montepaschi Siena) 6.41
10. Ronnie Burrell (Asseco Prokom Sopot) 6.19

Assists per game:

1. Theo Papaloukas (Olympiacos Piraeus) 5.18
2. Omar Cook (Unicaja Málaga) 5.13
3. Terrell McIntyre (Montepaschi Siena) 4.42
4. Pablo Prigioni (TAU Ceramica Vitoria) 4.33
5. Carlos Arroyo (Maccabi Tel Aviv) 4.13
6. Sani Bečirovič (Virtus Lottomatica Roma) 3.85
7. Juan Carlos Navarro (Regal FC Barcelona) 3.62
8. Vassilis Spanoulis (Panathinaikos Athens) 3.53
9. J. R. Holden (CSKA Moscow) 3.38
10. Milenko Tepić (Partizan Belgrade) 3.26

Steals per game:

1. David Logan (Asseco Prokom Sopot) 2.67
2. Shaun Stonerook (Montepaschi Siena) 2.40
3. Marques Green (Fenerbahçe Ülker İstanbul) 2.00
4. Ibrahim Jaaber (Virtus Lottomatica Roma) 1.94

Blocks per game:

1. Fran Vázquez (Regal FC Barcelona) 1.74
2. D'or Fischer (Maccabi Tel Aviv) 1.69
3. Tiago Splitter (TAU Ceramica Vitoria) 1.59
4. Stéphane Lasme (Partizan Belgrade) 1.53
5. Boniface N'Dong (Unicaja Málaga) 1.33

Average Index Rating:

1. D'or Fischer (Maccabi Tel Aviv) 21.46
2. Terrell McIntyre (Montepaschi Siena) 19.84
3. Mirsad Türkcan (Fenerbahçe Ülker İstanbul) 19.36
4. Sani Bečirovič (Virtus Lottomatica Roma) 17.85
5. Tiago Splitter (TAU Ceramica Vitoria) 17.82
6. Lior Eliyahu (Maccabi Tel Aviv) 17.56
7. Igor Rakočević (TAU Ceramica Vitoria) 16.76
8. Ioannis Bourousis (Olympiacos Piraeus) 16.14
9. Felipe Reyes (Real Madrid) 15.80
10. Immanuel McElroy (Alba Berlin) 15.75
11. Juan Carlos Navarro (Regal FC Barcelona) 15.14

=== 2009–10 ===
Points per game:

1. Linas Kleiza (Olympiacos Piraeus) 17.14
2. Qyntel Woods (Asseco Prokom Gdynia) 16.85
3. Marko Tomas (Cibona VIP Zagreb) 16.44
4. Keith Langford (Khimki Moscow) 15.53
5. Mike Batiste (Panathinaikos Athens) 15.54
6. David Logan (Asseco Prokom Gdynia) 15.30
7. Josh Childress (Olympiacos Piraeus) 15.20
8. Trajan Langdon (CSKA Moscow) 15.05
9. Mirza Teletović (Caja Laboral Vitoria) 14.80
10. Nikola Peković (Panathinaikos Athens) 14.77
11. Aleks Marić (Partizan Belgrade) 14.56

Rebounds per game:

1. Travis Watson (Žalgiris Kaunas) 9.46
2. Aleks Marić (Partizan Belgrade) 8.39
3. Lawrence Roberts (Partizan Belgrade) 7.38
4. Linas Kleiza (Olympiacos Piraeus) 6.50
5. Robertas Javtokas (Khimki Moscow) 6.38
6. Victor Khryapa (CSKA Moscow) 6.27
7. Qyntel Woods (Asseco Prokom Gdynia) 6.15
8. Mario Kasun (Efes Pilsen Istanbul) 5.75
9. Antonis Fotsis (Panathinaikos Athens) 5.50
10. Tiago Splitter (Caja Laboral Vitoria) 5.44

Assists per game:

1. Omar Cook (Unicaja Málaga) 5.94
2. Terrell McIntyre (Montepaschi Siena) 5.13
3. Theo Papaloukas (Olympiacos Piraeus) 5.05
4. Miloš Teodosić (Olympiacos Piraeus) 4.86
5. Pablo Prigioni (Real Madrid) 4.45
6. Ricky Rubio (Regal FC Barcelona) 4.09
7. Victor Khryapa (CSKA Moscow) 4.05
8. Bojan Popović (Lietuvos Rytas Vilnius/Efes Pilsen Istanbul) 3.88
9. Marcelinho Huertas (Caja Laboral Vitoria) 3.88
10. Jamont Gordon (Cibona VIP Zagreb) 3.80
11. Vassilis Spanoulis (Panathinaikos Athens) 3.64
12. Mantas Kalnietis (Žalgiris Kaunas) 3.63

Steals per game:

1. Bo McCalebb (Partizan Belgrade) 1.95
2. Victor Khryapa (CSKA Moscow) 1.95
3. Charles Smith (Efes Pilsen Istanbul) 1.94
4. Terrell McIntyre (Montepaschi Siena) 1.88

Blocks per game:

1. D'or Fischer (Maccabi Tel Aviv) 1.80
2. Slavko Vraneš (Partizan Belgrade) 1.50
3. Stéphane Lasme (Maccabi Tel Aviv) 1.40
4. Mirza Begić (Žalgiris Kaunas) 1.31
5. Robertas Javtokas (Khimki Moscow) 1.19
6. Fran Vázquez (Regal FC Barcelona) 1.14

Average Index Rating:

1. Aleks Marić (Partizan Belgrade) 21.11
2. Linas Kleiza (Olympiacos Piraeus) 17.86
3. Ramūnas Šiškauskas (CSKA Moscow) 16.95
4. Miloš Teodosić (Olympiacos Piraeus) 16.82
5. Keith Langford (Khimki Moscow) 16.40
6. Romain Sato (Montepaschi Siena) 16.31
7. Kšyštof Lavrinovič (Montepaschi Siena) 16.25
8. Travis Watson (Žalgiris Kaunas) 16.15
9. Jamont Gordon (Cibona VIP Zagreb) 16.07
10. Qyntel Woods (Asseco Prokom Gdynia) 16.00
11. Tiago Splitter (Caja Laboral Vitoria) 15.81
12. Trajan Langdon (CSKA Moscow) 15.62

=== 2010–11 ===
Points per game:

1. Igor Rakočević (Efes Pilsen Istanbul) 17.21
2. Mirza Teletović (Caja Laboral Vitoria) 15.45
3. Vassilis Spanoulis (Olympiacos Piraeus) 14.20
4. Juan Carlos Navarro (Regal FC Barcelona) 14.07
5. Kenny Gregory (Union Olimpija Ljubljana) 14.0
6. Joel Freeland (Unicaja Málaga) 13.87
7. Fernando San Emeterio (Caja Laboral Vitoria) 13.70
8. Mike Batiste (Panathinaikos Athens) 13.30
9. Roko Ukić (Asseco Prokom Gdynia) 13.21

Rebounds per game:

1. Mirsad Türkcan (Fenerbahçe Ülker İstanbul) 7.33
2. James Gist (Partizan mt:s Belgrade) 6.93
3. Paulius Jankunas (Žalgiris Kaunas) 6.88
4. Ioannis Bourousis (Olympiacos Piraeus) 6.56
5. Joel Freeland (Unicaja Málaga) 6.33
6. Kenny Gregory (Union Olimpija Ljubljana) 6.06
7. D'or Fischer (Real Madrid) 5.87
8. Jonas Valančiūnas (Lietuvos Rytas Vilnius) 5.8
9. Kerem Gönlüm (Efes Pilsen Istanbul) 5.67

Assists per game:

1. Dimitris Diamantidis (Panathinaikos Athens) 6.23
2. Marcelinho Huertas (Caja Laboral Vitoria) 5.55
3. Omar Cook (Power Electronics Valencia) 5.52
4. Jeremy Pargo (Maccabi Tel Aviv) 4.27
5. Vassilis Spanoulis (Olympiacos Piraeus) 4.25
6. Vlado Ilievski (Union Olimpija Ljubljana) 4.07
7. Theo Papaloukas (Olympiacos Piraeus) 3.83
8. Doron Perkins (Maccabi Tel Aviv) 3.63
9. Berni Rodríguez (Unicaja Málaga) 3.63
10. Miloš Teodosić (Olympiacos Piraeus) 3.61

Steals per game:

1. Chuck Eidson (Maccabi Tel Aviv) 2.64
2. Charles Smith (Virtus Lottomatica Roma) 1.85
3. Omar Cook (Power Electronics Valencia) 1.81
4. Bo McCalebb (Montepaschi Siena) 1.80
5. Vlado Ilievski (Union Olimpija Ljubljana) 1.73

Blocks per game:

1. Mirza Begić (Žalgiris Kaunas/Real Madrid) 1.50
2. D'or Fischer (Real Madrid) 1.43
3. Ioannis Bourousis (Olympiacos Piraeus) 1.33

Average Index Rating:

1. Fernando San Emeterio (Caja Laboral Vitoria) 19.05
2. Dimitris Diamantidis (Panathinaikos Athens) 18.50
3. Joel Freeland (Unicaja Málaga) 17.47
4. Igor Rakočević (Efes Pilsen Istanbul) 15.00
5. Mike Batiste (Panathinaikos Athens) 14.60
6. Chuck Eidson (Maccabi Tel Aviv) 14.32
7. Vassilis Spanoulis (Olympiacos Piraeus) 14.30
8. Ioannis Bourousis (Olympiacos Piraeus) 14.17

=== 2011–12 ===
Points per game:

1. Bo McCalebb (Montepaschi Siena) 16.88
2. Vassilis Spanoulis (Olympiacos Piraeus) 16.67
3. Sonny Weems (Žalgiris Kaunas) 15.53
4. Henry Domercant (UNICS Kazan) 15.47
5. Jaycee Carroll (Real Madrid) 14.19
6. Nenad Krstić (CSKA Moscow) 14.18
7. Andrei Kirilenko (CSKA Moscow) 14.06
8. Malik Hairston (Olimpia Milano) 13.92
9. Sasha Vujačić (Anadolu Efes Istanbul) 13.88
10. Juan Carlos Navarro (Regal FC Barcelona) 13.63

Rebounds per game:

1. Andrei Kirilenko (CSKA Moscow) 7.47
2. Joel Freeland (Unicaja Málaga) 6.79
3. Ioannis Bourousis (Olimpia Milano) 6.40
4. Felipe Reyes (Real Madrid) 6.31
5. David Andersen (Montepaschi Siena) 6.15
6. Luka Žorić (Unicaja Málaga) 6.13
7. Vladimir Veremeenko (UNICS Kazan) 6.00
8. D'or Fischer (Bizkaia Bilbao Basket) 5.95
9. Duško Savanović (Anadolu Efes Istanbul) 5.63
10. Paulius Jankūnas (Žalgiris Kaunas) 5.56

Assists per game:

1. Omar Cook (Olimpia Milano) 5.69
2. Sergio Rodríguez (Real Madrid) 5.38
3. Miloš Teodosić (CSKA Moscow) 5.00
4. Dimitris Diamantidis (Panathinaikos Athens) 4.78
5. Kerem Tunçeri (Anadolu Efes Istanbul) 4.47
6. Marcelinho Huertas (Regal FC Barcelona) 4.38
7. Vassilis Spanoulis (Olympiacos Piraeus) 3.95
8. Aaron Jackson (Bizkaia Bilbao Basket) 3.85
9. Mantas Kalnietis (Žalgiris Kaunas) 3.69
10. Victor Khryapa (CSKA Moscow) 3.30

Steals per game:

1. Jamon Gordon (Galatasaray Medical Park) 1.81
2. Andrei Kirilenko (CSKA Moscow) 1.53
3. Dimitris Diamantidis (Panathinaikos Athens) 1.48
4. Oliver Lafayette (Asseco Prokom Gdynia/Anadolu Efes Istanbul) 1.44
5. Yogev Ohayon (Maccabi Tel Aviv) 1.38
6. Bo McCalebb (Montepaschi Siena) 1.29
7. James Gist (Fenerbahçe Ülker İstanbul) 1.25
8. Gerald Fitch (Unicaja Málaga) 1.23
9. Nick Calathes (Panathinaikos Athens) 1.22
10. Joshua Shipp (Galatasaray Medical Park) 1.20

Blocks per game:

1. Andrei Kirilenko (CSKA Moscow) 1.94
2. Mirza Begić (Real Madrid) 1.67
3. Richard Hendrix (Maccabi Tel Aviv) 1.29
4. Kyle Hines (Olympiacos Piraeus) 1.14
5. D'or Fischer (Bizkaia Bilbao Basket) 1.11
6. Boniface N'Dong (Regal FC Barcelona) 1.10
7. Fran Vázquez (Regal FC Barcelona) 1.05
8. James Gist (Fenerbahçe Ülker İstanbul) 0.94
9. Luka Žorić (Unicaja Málaga) 0.94
10. Stanko Barać (Anadolu Efes Istanbul) 0.93

Average Index Rating:

1. Andrei Kirilenko (CSKA Moscow) 24.18
2. Nenad Krstić (CSKA Moscow) 18.41
3. Bo McCalebb (Montepaschi Siena) 17.29
4. Dimitris Diamantidis (Panathinaikos Athens) 16.43
5. Henry Domercant (UNICS Kazan) 16.26
6. Vassilis Spanoulis (Olympiacos Piraeus) 15.95
7. Giorgi Shermadini (Bennet Cantù) 15.31
8. Erazem Lorbek (Regal FC Barcelona) 15.14
9. Nikola Mirotić (Real Madrid) 14.56
10. Luka Žorić (Unicaja Málaga) 13.69

=== 2012–13 ===
Points per game:

1. Bobby Brown (Montepaschi Siena) 18.83
2. Boštjan Nachbar (Brose Baskets Bamberg) 16.09
3. Bojan Bogdanović (Fenerbahçe Ülker İstanbul) 15.90
4. Vassilis Spanoulis (Olympiacos Piraeus) 14.74
5. Curtis Jerrells (Beşiktaş J.K. İstanbul) 14.18
6. Maciej Lampe (Caja Laboral Vitoria) 13.89
7. Jordan Farmar (Anadolu Efes İstanbul) 13.76
8. Sonny Weems (CSKA Moscow) 13.71
9. Rudy Fernández (Real Madrid) 13.67
10. Ricky Hickman (Maccabi Tel Aviv) 13.52

Rebounds per game:

1. Victor Khryapa (CSKA Moscow) 7.31
2. Ante Tomić (FC Barcelona Regal) 6.50
3. Shawn James (Maccabi Tel Aviv) 6.48
4. Stéphane Lasme (Panathinaikos Athens) 6.14
5. Maciej Lampe (Caja Laboral Vitoria) 6.14
6. Kyle Hines (Olympiacos Piraeus) 6.03
7. Semih Erden (Anadolu Efes İstanbul) 5.59
8. Paul Davis (BC Khimki) 5.52
9. Deon Thompson (Alba Berlin) 5.43
10. Nikola Mirotić (Real Madrid) 5.31

Assists per game:

1. Zoran Planinić (BC Khimki) 6.32
2. Dimitris Diamantidis (Panathinaikos Athens) 5.78
3. Vassilis Spanoulis (Olympiacos Piraeus) 5.48
4. Bobby Brown (Montepaschi Siena) 5.33
5. Miloš Teodosić (CSKA Moscow) 4.90
6. Thomas Heurtel (Caja Laboral Vitoria) 4.50
7. Omar Cook (Olimpia Milano/Caja Laboral Vitoria) 4.04
8. Jamon Gordon (Anadolu Efes İstanbul) 4.00
9. Sergio Rodríguez (Real Madrid) 3.93
10. Jordan Farmar (Anadolu Efes İstanbul) 3.90

Steals per game:

1. Bo McCalebb (Fenerbahçe Ülker İstanbul) 1.91
2. Jamon Gordon (Anadolu Efes İstanbul) 1.76
3. Victor Khryapa (CSKA Moscow) 1.69
4. Rudy Fernández (Real Madrid) 1.52
5. Ricky Hickman (Maccabi Tel Aviv) 1.44
6. Dimitris Diamantidis (Panathinaikos Athens) 1.41
7. Omar Cook (Olimpia Milano/Caja Laboral Vitoria) 1.25
8. Earl Calloway (Unicaja Málaga) 1.22
9. Zoran Planinić (BC Khimki) 1.14
10. Curtis Jerrells (Beşiktaş J.K. İstanbul) 1.12

Blocks per game:

1. Shawn James (Maccabi Tel Aviv) 1.93
2. Stéphane Lasme (Panathinaikos Athens) 1.86
3. Sasha Kaun (CSKA Moscow) 1.23
4. Sergei Monia (BC Khimki) 1.17
5. Kyle Hines (Olympiacos Piraeus) 1.16
6. Ante Tomić (FC Barcelona Regal) 1.10
7. Gašper Vidmar (Beşiktaş J.K. İstanbul) 1.09
8. Luka Žorić (Unicaja Málaga) 1.04
9. Paul Davis (BC Khimki) 0.96
10. Sharrod Ford (Brose Baskets Bamberg) 0.96

Average Index Rating:

1. Bobby Brown (Montepaschi Siena) 17.38
2. Victor Khryapa (CSKA Moscow) 17.04
3. Nenad Krstić (CSKA Moscow) 16.83
4. Ante Tomić (FC Barcelona Regal) 16.77
5. Shawn James (Maccabi Tel Aviv) 16.56
6. Rudy Fernández (Real Madrid) 16.22
7. Paul Davis (BC Khimki) 16.09
8. Bojan Bogdanović (Fenerbahçe Ülker İstanbul) 15.48
9. Zoran Planinić (BC Khimki) 15.18
10. Vassilis Spanoulis (Olympiacos Piraeus) 15.13

=== 2013–14 ===
Points per game:

1. Keith Langford (Olimpia Milano) 17.6
2. Justin Dentmon (Zalgiris Kaunas) 16.8
3. Vassilis Spanoulis (Olympiacos Piraeus) 15.1
4. Bojan Bogdanović (Fenerbahce Istanbul) 14.8
5. Bogdan Bogdanović (Partizan Belgrade) 14.8
6. Tarence Kinsey (Partizan Belgrade) 14.8
7. Sergio Rodríguez (Real Madrid) 14.0
8. Malcolm Delaney (Bayern Munich) 13.9
9. Derrick Brown (Lokomotiv Kuban) 13.9
10. Ricky Hickman (Maccabi Tel Aviv) 13.52

Rebounds per game:

1. Joffrey Lauvergne (Partizan Belgrade) 8.6
2. Richard Hendrix (Lokomotiv Kuban) 7.3
3. Andrés Nocioni (Baskonia Vitoria) 6.6
4. John Bryant (Bayern Munich) 6.5
5. Pops Mensah-Bonsu (Galatasaray Istanbul) 6.5
6. Paulius Jankūnas (Zalgiris Kaunas) 6.5
7. Ante Tomić (Barcelona) 6.4
8. Furkan Aldemir (Galatasaray Istanbul) 6.3
9. Nemanja Bjelica (Fenerbahce Istanbul) 6.1
10. Ioannis Bourousis (Real Madrid) 5.9

Assists per game:

1. Dimitris Diamantidis (Panathinaikos Athens) 6.2
2. Carlos Arroyo (Galatasaray Istanbul) 5.5
3. Thomas Heurtel (Baskonia Vitoria) 5.3
4. Jamon Gordon (Anadolu Efes İstanbul) 5.2
5. Sergio Rodríguez (Real Madrid) 4.9
6. Mantas Kalnietis (Lokomotiv Kuban) 4.8
7. Emir Preldžić (Fenerbahce Istanbul) 4.7
8. Vassilis Spanoulis (Olympiacos Piraeus) 4.6
9. Malcolm Delaney (Bayern Munich) 4.5
10. Daniel Hackett (Montepaschi Siena / Olimpia Milano) 4.3

Steals per game:

1. Jamon Gordon (Anadolu Efes İstanbul) 2.0
2. Tarence Kinsey (Partizan Belgrade) 1.8
3. Jonas Mačiulis (Panathinaikos Athens) 1.7
4. Bogdan Bogdanović (Partizan Belgrade) 1.6
5. Rudy Fernández (Real Madrid) 1.5
6. Dimitris Diamantidis (Panathinaikos Athens) 1.4
7. Derrick Brown (Lokomotiv Kuban) 1.4
8. Bo McCalebb (Fenerbahce Istanbul) 1.4
9. Justin Dentmon (Zalgiris Kaunas) 1.2
10. Daniel Hackett (Montepaschi Siena / Olimpia Milano) 1.2

Blocks per game:

1. Bryant Dunston (Olympiacos Piraeus) 1.3
2. Andrés Nocioni (Baskonia Vitoria) 1.2
3. Fran Vázquez (Unicaja Malaga) 1.1
4. Salah Mejri (Real Madrid) 1.1
5. Richard Hendrix (Lokomotiv Kuban) 1.1
6. Robertas Javtokas (Zalgiris Kaunas) 1.1
7. Joey Dorsey (Barcelona) 1.1
8. Alex Tyus (Maccabi Tel Aviv) 1.0
9. Semih Erden (Efes Istanbul) 1.0
10. Stéphane Lasme (Panathinaikos Athens) 1.0
11. Brent Petway (Olympiacos Piraeus) 1.0

Average Index Rating:

1. Keith Langford (Olimpia Milano) 17.7
2. Malcolm Delaney (Bayern Munich) 17.4
3. Rudy Fernández (Real Madrid) 17.2
4. Andrés Nocioni (Baskonia Vitoria) 16.2
5. Derrick Brown (Lokomotiv Kuban) 16.2
6. Nikola Mirotić (Real Madrid) 15.9
7. Sergio Rodríguez (Real Madrid) 15.9
8. Ante Tomić (Barcelona) 15.8
9. Emir Preldžić (Fenerbahce Istanbul) 15.5
10. Joffrey Lauvergne (Partizan Begrade) 15.4
