= Grigorij Khizhnyak =

Ukrainian basketball player

Personal information
- Born: July 16, 1974 Mykolaiv, Ukrainian SSR, Soviet Union
- Died: October 5, 2018 (aged 44)
- Listed height: 7 ft 1 in (2.16 m)
- Listed weight: 260 lb (118 kg)

Career information
- Playing career: 1994–2010
- Position: Center

Career history
- 1994–1995: Mykolaiv
- 1995–1998: Budivelnyk
- 1998–1999: Avtodor Saratov
- 1999–2000: Kyiv
- 2000–2001: Žalgiris Kaunas
- 2001: Shabab Al Ahli
- 2001–2002: Žalgiris Kaunas
- 2002: Kyiv
- 2003: Pamesa Valencia
- 2003–2004: Peristeri
- 2004–2005: Makedonikos
- 2005–2006: Dynamo St. Petersburg
- 2006: Azovmash Mariupol
- 2006–2007: Kyiv
- 2007–2009: Dnipro
- 2009–2010: Budivelnyk

Career highlights
- 2× EuroLeague Blocks Leader (2001, 2002); Lithuanian League champion (2001); 2× Lithuanian All-Star (2001, 2002); Lithuanian All-Star Game MVP (2001); 4× Ukrainian Super League League champion (1996, 1997, 2000, 2006); 2× Ukrainian Cup winner (2006, 2007)

Grigorij Khizhnyak (alternate spelling: Grygorii Khizhniak, Ukrainian: Григорій Хижняк; July 16, 1974 – October 5, 2018) was a Ukrainian professional basketball player. Standing at a height of 7 ft 1 in (2.16 m), he played at the center position. He was the EuroLeague's leader in blocked shots in two consecutive seasons, in 2000–01 and 2001–02.

== Professional career ==
Khizhnyak, who was a dominant defensive force in the paint, led the EuroLeague in blocks per game for two consecutive years (2001, 2002), while playing with the Lithuanian League club Žalgiris Kaunas. Among his greatest career achievements, was his participation in the ULEB Cup (EuroCup)'s 2005 Final, while he was a member of the Greek League club Makedonikos.

== National team career ==
Khizhnyak was a regular member of the senior men's Ukrainian national basketball team. With Ukraine, he played at the 1997 EuroBasket, and the 2003 EuroBasket.

== Death ==
Khizhnyak died of a heart attack on 5 October, 2018, at the age of 44.

== EuroLeague career statistics ==
Legend
GP	Games played	GS	Games started	MPG	Minutes per game
FG%	Field-goal percentage	3P%	3-point field-goal percentage	FT%	Free-throw percentage
RPG	Rebounds per game	APG	Assists per game	SPG	Steals per game
BPG	Blocks per game	PPG	Points per game	PIR	Performance index rating
**Bold**	Career high

Led the league

Year	Team	GP	GS	MPG	FG%	3P%	FT%	RPG	APG	SPG	BPG	PPG	PIR
2000–01	Žalgiris Kaunas	12	12	29.8	**.539**	.000	.840	7.2	.8	.7	**3.2**	12.1	18.8
2001–02	Žalgiris Kaunas	**14**	**14**	**32.2**	.508	**.333**	**.888**	**8.1**	**1.4**	**.9**	**3.2**	**14.4**	**21.6**
Career		26	26	31.1	.520	.167	.865	7.7	1.2	.8	3.2	13.3	20.3
