= David Rivers =

American basketball player and coach (born 1965)

Personal information
- Born: January 20, 1965 (age 61) Jersey City, New Jersey, U.S.
- Listed height: 5 ft 11 in (1.80 m)
- Listed weight: 170 lb (77 kg)

Career information
- High school: St. Anthony (Jersey City, New Jersey)
- College: Notre Dame (1984–1988)
- NBA draft: 1988: 1st round, 25th overall pick
- Drafted by: Los Angeles Lakers
- Playing career: 1988–2001
- Position: Point guard
- Number: 14, 44, 32, 4, 15
- Coaching career: 2014–2015

Career history

Playing
- 1988–1989: Los Angeles Lakers
- 1989–1990: Los Angeles Clippers
- 1990–1991: Tulsa Fast Breakers
- 1991: Memphis Rockers
- 1991–1992: Los Angeles Clippers
- 1992–1993: La Crosse Catbirds
- 1993–1995: Olympique Antibes
- 1995–1997: Olympiacos
- 1997–1998: Fortitudo Bologna
- 1998–2000: Tofaş
- 2000–2001: Olympiacos
- 2003–2004: Olympique Antibes

Coaching
- 2008: Virtus Bologna (Academy)
- 2014–2015: Kennesaw State (associate HC)

Career highlights
- As player: EuroLeague champion (1997); EuroLeague Final Four MVP (1997); EuroLeague assists leader (2000); EuroLeague steals leader (1998); 4× FIBA EuroStar (1996–1999); FIBA EuroStars MVP (1996); Italian Cup winner (1998); Greek League Hall of Fame (2022); 2× Greek League champion (1996, 1997); Greek Cup winner (1997); Greek League MVP (1997); Greek Cup Finals MVP (1997); French League champion (1995); French League Foreign Player's MVP (1995); 2x French All Star Game (1994, 1995); 2× Turkish League champion (1999, 2000); 2× Turkish Cup winner (1999, 2000); CBA champion (1992); CBA Playoff/Finals MVP (1992); All-CBA First Team (1992); All-CBA Second Team (1993); 2× CBA assists leader (1992, 1993); Second-team All-American – NABC (1988); USBWA Most Courageous Award (1987); Second-team Parade All-American (1984); McDonald's All-American (1984)
- Stats at NBA.com
- Stats at Basketball Reference

David Lee Rivers (born January 20, 1965) is an American former professional basketball player and coach. A 5’11”(1.80 m ) tall point guard, he reached star status in the EuroLeague, mainly while playing with Olympiacos, under head coach Dušan Ivković. Rivers played 3 seasons in the NBA, one with the Los Angeles Lakers (1988–89) and two more with the Los Angeles Clippers (1989–90, 1991–92). He played college basketball for the Notre Dame Fighting Irish.

== Early years ==
Rivers grew up in Jersey City, and played high school basketball under Bob Hurley, at powerhouse St. Anthony High School. He contributed to the team winning three State Championships and became the school's first player to be invited to the McDonald's All-American Game (1984).

Rivers was teammates at St. Anthony with John Valentin.

== College career ==
Rivers accepted a basketball scholarship from the University of Notre Dame, to play under head coach Digger Phelps. As a freshman, he was named a starter at point guard. As a sophomore, he contributed to the team reaching the Sweet 16 in the NCAA Division I men's basketball tournament.

On August 24, 1986, before the start of the season, he was a passenger in a van being driven by former college teammate Ken Barlow, returning to an apartment they shared after working a summer job with a caterer business, when the vehicle overturned and went into a ditch, after trying to avoid an oncoming car. Barlow had minor cuts, but Rivers suffered a life-threatening 15-inch abdominal cut, that he was able to recover from to play in 32 college games that season.

He was named the team's MVP for four consecutive seasons and was a team co-captain for three straight seasons. He received third-team All-American in 1986–87, and second-team honors in '87–88.

He currently ranks fourth in school history, in scoring with 2,058 points, and second in Notre Dame history in assists (586). He also ranks second all-time in steals (201), and steals average (1.7 steals per game), second in games started (116), fourth in assists average (5.0 assists per game) and three-point field goal percentage (.406), ninth in games played (118), 11th all-time in three-point field goals made (67), and 13th in three-point field goals attempted (165). He was selected to the 1987 NCAA Championship All-Regional team. He earned four monograms while a member of the Fighting Irish.

== Professional playing career ==
=== National Basketball Association ===
Rivers was selected by the Los Angeles Lakers in the first round (25th overall) of the 1988 NBA draft, after the player they were targeting (Brian Shaw), was selected one choice before. As a rookie he played in 47 regular season games, averaging 2.9 points and 2.3 assists per game, and 6 playoff games, averaging 2.5 points and 1 assist per game. The team eventually lost in the NBA Finals against the Detroit Pistons.

Rivers was selected by the Minnesota Timberwolves in the 1989 NBA expansion draft. He was released before the start of the regular season on November 2. On November 14, 1989, he signed as a free agent with the Los Angeles Clippers. He played in 53 games (11 of them as a starter), averaging 4.2 points and 3 assists per contest. He wasn't re-signed after the season.

On September 18, 1990, he signed as a free agent with the San Antonio Spurs. He was released on October 19.

In 1990, he signed with the Tulsa Fast Breakers of the Continental Basketball Association. In December, he was placed in the injured reserve list with a sprained ankle.

On July 12, 1991, he was traded to the La Crosse Catbirds of the Continental Basketball Association, playing under coach Flip Saunders. On November 23, he signed with the Los Angeles Clippers, playing in 15 games before being released. On January 7, 1992, he was released by the Los Angeles Clippers. He returned to La Crosse and later was called up by Los Angeles Clippers, where he played 15 games of the 1991–1992 season. On December 17, he re-signed with La Crosse, where he won the league title. He averaged 27.1 points and 9.6 assists during the finals and received MVP honors. He was selected to the All-CBA First Team in 1992 and Second Team in 1993.

=== Europe ===
In 1993, he signed with Olympique Antibes of the LNB Pro A French League, where he played 2 seasons, winning the Championship in 1995.

In 1995, he signed with Olympiacos of the Greek Basket League, winning the title in 1996. In 1996–1997, he contributed to the team winning the Greek Basketball Cup, the Greek Basket League and the EuroLeague (the second time a Greek club won the trophy), where he faced FC Barcelona Bàsquet and was named EuroLeague Final Four MVP, averaging 27 points per game in the two Final Four games in Rome. During that season, Rivers averaged 17.2 points, 3.4 assists, 3.4 rebounds, and 2.0 steals in 37.9 minutes per game in 23 games played in the EuroLeague. At that stage of his career, he was considered one of the best basketball players in Europe. He is remembered as a legend by Olympiacos fans and he is widely considered one of the greatest players in Olympiacos history. He was also named the European Player of the Year in 1997, making him the first American ever to receive European Basketball's highest honor.

In the 1997 off-season, Rivers left Olympiacos to join Italian League club Teamsystem Bologna, playing alongside former NBA All-star Dominique Wilkins. He averaged 12.8 points, 3.3 assists per game and contributed to the team winning the Italian Basketball Cup, receiving Co-MVP honors with teammate Carlton Myers.

In 1998, he signed with Tofaş of the Turkish League, where he won two Turkish League championships and two Turkish Cups, before re-joining Olympiacos for one season.

In 2000, he returned to play with Olympiacos B.C., contributing to the team reaching the Greek Basket League Championship game, where it lost to Panathinaikos B.C.

Although he didn't play for 2 years, he then signed with Olympique Antibes for the 2003–04 season in the second division of the LNB Pro A French League. In 2013, he was inducted into the Olympique Antibes Basketball Club Hall of Fame and had his jersey number retired.

== Personal life ==
In 2009, he was hired as a coach by Virtus Bologna of the Lega Basket Serie A, to assist in the development of junior players that season. On April 22, 2014, he was hired as an associate head coach for the Kennesaw State Owls. He is a director at Village Camps Basketball Camps in Switzerland.

On Monday, April 15, 2024, YouTuber, WHAT THE HALE$, posted a $1,000 abandoned storage unit video where he was invited by two fans, now known as TDK COLLECTS, to explore a 20 year old storage unit formerly owned by Rivers

== Career statistics ==
Legend
GP	Games played	GS	Games started	MPG	Minutes per game
FG%	Field goal percentage	3P%	3-point field goal percentage	FT%	Free throw percentage
RPG	Rebounds per game	APG	Assists per game	SPG	Steals per game
BPG	Blocks per game	PPG	Points per game	**Bold**	Career high

=== NBA ===
==== Regular season ====
Year	Team	GP	GS	MPG	FG%	3P%	FT%	RPG	APG	SPG	BPG	PPG
1988–89	L.A. Lakers	47	0	9.4	.402	**.167**	.833	.9	2.3	.5	**.2**	2.9
1989–90	L.A. Clippers	**52**	**11**	**13.9**	**.406**	.000	.756	**1.6**	**3.0**	**.6**	.0	**4.2**
1991–92	L.A. Clippers	15	0	8.1	.333	.000	**.909**	1.3	1.4	.5	.1	2.0
Career		114	11	11.3	.398	.083	.794	1.3	2.5	.5	.1	3.4

==== Playoffs ====
Year	Team	GP	GS	MPG	FG%	3P%	FT%	RPG	APG	SPG	BPG	PPG
1989	L.A. Lakers	6	0	5.5	.333	.000	.875	.7	1.0	.0	.0	2.5

== Career achievements ==
=== Club titles ===
- CBA: **1** (with La Crosse Catbirds: 1991–92)
- French League: **1** (with Olympique Antibes: 1994–95)
- Greek League: **2** (with Olympiacos: 1995–96, 1996–97)
- Greek Cup: **1** (with Olympiacos: 1996–97)
- EuroLeague: **1** (with Olympiacos: 1996–97)
- Italian Cup: **1** (with Fortitudo Bologna: 1997–98)
- Turkish League: **2** (with Tofaş: 1998–99, 1999–00)
- Turkish Cup: **2** (with Tofaş: 1998–99, 1999–00)
