= 2026 FIBA U16 EuroBasket =

International youth basketball tournament

Tournament details
- Host country: Romania
- City: Oradea
- Dates: 7–15 August 2026
- Teams: 16 (from 1 confederation)
- Venues: 2 (in 1 host city)

Final positions
- Champions: Latvia (1st title)
- Runners-up: France
- Third place: Spain

Tournament statistics
- Games played: 56
- MVP: (Latvia) Benjamin Berrouet
- Top scorer: (Latvia) Benjamin Berrouet (165 Pts)

Official website
- www.fiba.basketball

The 2026 FIBA U16 EuroBasket was the 38th edition of the European basketball championship for men's under-16 national teams. The tournament was played in Oradea, Romania, from 7 to 15 August 2026.

Latvia men's national under-16 basketball team won the tournament and became the U16 European champion for the first time, with a finals win 75–69 over France. Latvia's forward Benjamin Berrouet was recognized as the MVP. And the All-Star Five players selected for the tournament were Benjamin Berrouet and Markuss Jahovics from Latvia, Messie-Guethan Iwani from France, Danielius Jasikevičius from Lithuania, Rhys Robinson from Spain.

== Participating teams ==
Team	App	Last	Streak	Best placement in the tournament	Prev
Teams maintained from the 2025 edition
Belgium	14th	2023	1	Seventh place (1975, 1977)	▲2nd, Div. B
Czech Republic	8th	2012	1	Runners-up (2008, 2011)	▲3rd, Div. B
France	36th	2025	27	Champions (2004, 2014, 2017, 2024)	5th
Georgia	10th	2025	3	Seventh place (1999)	11th
Germany	29th	2025	4	Third place (1981, 1983)	9th
Greece	36th	2025	30	Champions (1989, 1993)	10th
Israel	30th	2025	8	Third place (1997)	13th
Italy	37th	2025	23	Champions (1991)	4th
Latvia	23rd	2025	21	Runners-up (2014)	6th
Lithuania	24th	2025	23	Champions (2008, 2022)	2nd
Poland	20th	2024	1	Fourth place (2009)	▲1st, Div. B
Romania	3rd	2025	2	Eighth place (1987)	12th
Serbia	18th	2025	18	Champions (2007, 2025)	1st
Slovenia	16th	2025	8	Third place (2025)	3rd
Spain	38th	2025	38	Champions (2006, 2009, 2013, 2016, 2019, 2023)	8th
Turkey	36th	2025	24	Champions (2005, 2012)	7th

== Venues ==
Oradea was the host city and selected for the tournament these two venues: Arena Antonio Alexe and Oradea Arena.

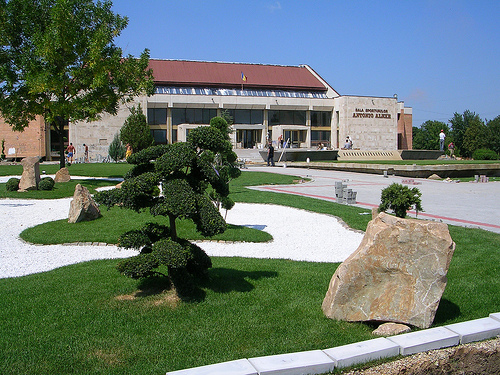
Arena Antonio Alexe

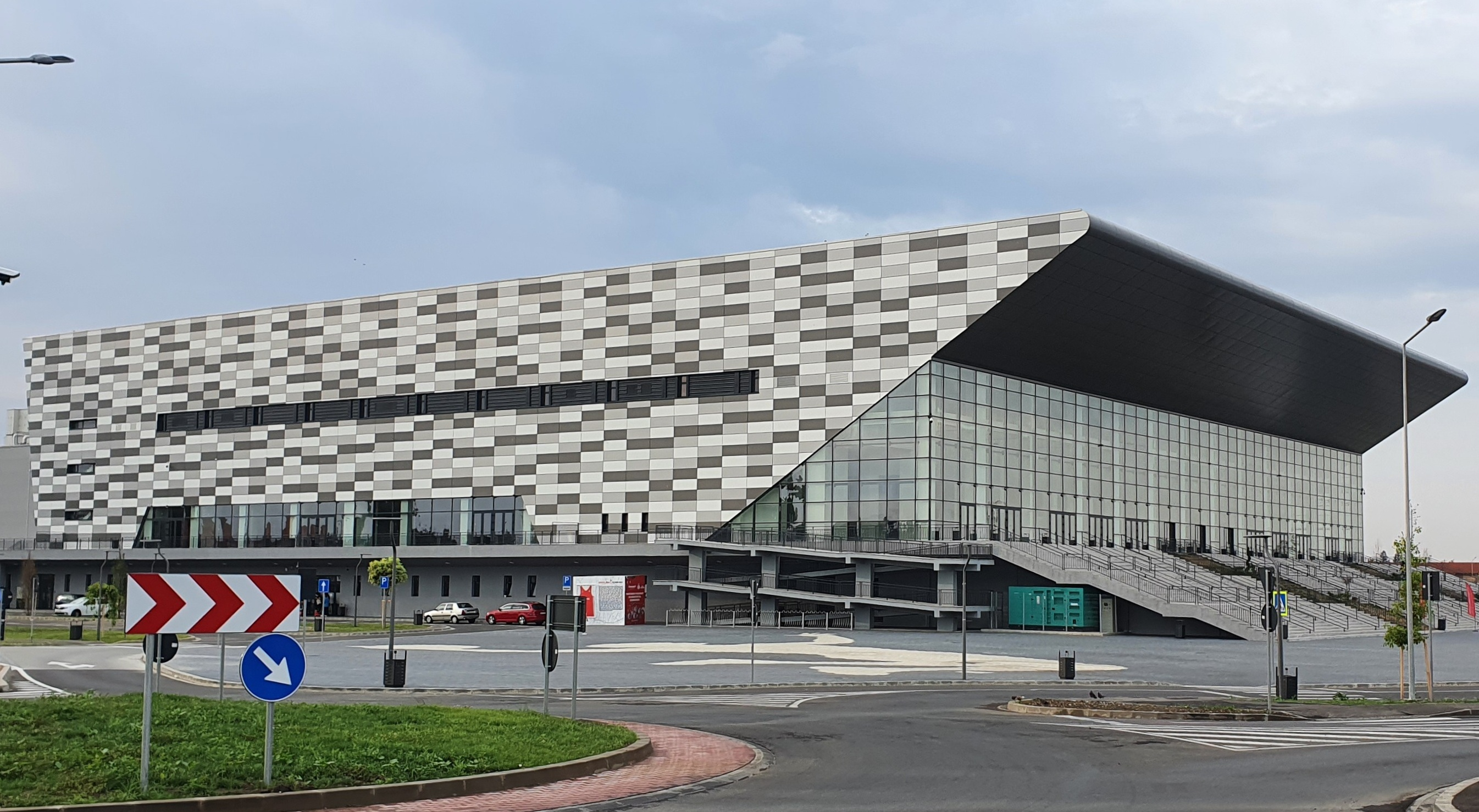
Oradea Arena

== First round ==
The draw of the first round was held on 5 February 2026 in Freising, Germany.

In the first round, the teams were drawn into four groups of four. All teams advanced to the playoffs.

All times are local (Eastern European Summer Time; UTC+3).

=== Group A ===
Pos	Team	Pld	W	L	PF	PA	PD	Pts
1	Lithuania	3	3	0	272	231	+41	6
2	Poland	3	2	1	243	215	+28	5
3	Romania (H)	3	1	2	223	272	−49	4
4	Serbia	3	0	3	222	242	−20	3

Source: FIBA
(H) Hosts

7 August 2026
17:00

Boxscore

Poland	105–62	Romania
Scoring by quarter: 26–11, 19–22, 37–11, 23–18

Oradea Arena
Attendance: 230

7 August 2026
19:30

Boxscore

Serbia	79–95	Lithuania
Scoring by quarter: 21–18, 19–29, 19–23, 20–25

Oradea Arena
Attendance: 70

8 August 2026
14:30

Boxscore

Lithuania	83–66	Poland
Scoring by quarter: 24–19, 15–10, 28–17, 16–20

Arena Antonio Alexe
Attendance: 60

8 August 2026
17:00

Boxscore

Romania	75–73	Serbia
Scoring by quarter: 20–20, 11–18, 20–12, 24–23

Oradea Arena
Attendance: 500

9 August 2026
12:00

Boxscore

Poland	72–70	Serbia
Scoring by quarter: 18–21, 16–13, 23–18, 15–18

Arena Antonio Alexe
Attendance: 70

9 August 2026
17:00

Boxscore

Lithuania	94–86 (OT)	Romania
Scoring by quarter: 23–19, 25–17, 14–22, 20–24, Overtime: 12–4

Oradea Arena
Attendance: 1,132

=== Group B ===
Pos	Team	Pld	W	L	PF	PA	PD	Pts
1	Latvia	3	3	0	265	213	+52	6
2	Turkey	3	2	1	242	231	+11	5
3	Czech Republic	3	1	2	264	274	−10	4
4	Italy	3	0	3	216	269	−53	3

Source: FIBA

7 August 2026
12:00

Boxscore

Turkey	102–74	Czech Republic
Scoring by quarter: 29–16, 26–21, 16–20, 31–17

Oradea Arena
Attendance: 65

7 August 2026
14:30

Boxscore

Italy	70–82	Latvia
Scoring by quarter: 24–21, 17–14, 13–30, 16–17

Oradea Arena
Attendance: 120

8 August 2026
12:00

Boxscore

Czech Republic	110–77	Italy
Scoring by quarter: 32–14, 29–24, 24–21, 25–18

Arena Antonio Alexe
Attendance: 115

8 August 2026
17:00

Boxscore

Latvia	88–63	Turkey
Scoring by quarter: 38–16, 21–11, 10–17, 19–19

Arena Antonio Alexe
Attendance: 104

9 August 2026
12:00

Boxscore

Turkey	77–69	Italy
Scoring by quarter: 23–18, 14–16, 20–12, 20–23

Oradea Arena
Attendance: 80

9 August 2026
14:30

Boxscore

Latvia	95–80	Czech Republic
Scoring by quarter: 20–20, 36–21, 19–19, 20–20

Arena Antonio Alexe
Attendance: 65

=== Group C ===
Pos	Team	Pld	W	L	PF	PA	PD	Pts
1	Spain	3	3	0	272	199	+73	6
2	Israel	3	2	1	248	260	−12	5
3	Greece	3	1	2	256	248	+8	4
4	Georgia	3	0	3	189	258	−69	3

Source: FIBA

7 August 2026
12:00

Boxscore

Israel	97–75	Georgia
Scoring by quarter: 28–22, 29–14, 23–19, 17–20

Arena Antonio Alexe
Attendance: 95

7 August 2026
14:30

Boxscore

Spain	96–86 (OT)	Greece
Scoring by quarter: 19–23, 16–23, 26–18, 22–19, Overtime: 13–3

Arena Antonio Alexe
Attendance: 85

8 August 2026
12:00

Boxscore

Greece	84–89	Israel
Scoring by quarter: 23–15, 28–25, 12–20, 21–29

Oradea Arena
Attendance: 110

8 August 2026
19:30

Boxscore

Georgia	51–75	Spain
Scoring by quarter: 12–20, 17–17, 5–18, 17–20

Arena Antonio Alexe
Attendance: 67

9 August 2026
14:30

Boxscore

Greece	86–63	Georgia
Scoring by quarter: 16–9, 22–21, 22–14, 26–19

Oradea Arena
Attendance: 126

9 August 2026
19:30

Boxscore

Israel	62–101	Spain
Scoring by quarter: 12–30, 16–20, 12–32, 22–19

Oradea Arena
Attendance: 253

=== Group D ===
Pos	Team	Pld	W	L	PF	PA	PD	Pts
1	France	3	3	0	265	187	+78	6
2	Slovenia	3	2	1	241	230	+11	5
3	Germany	3	1	2	210	240	−30	4
4	Belgium	3	0	3	188	247	−59	3

Source: FIBA

7 August 2026
17:00

Boxscore

Germany	82–60	Belgium
Scoring by quarter: 17–11, 16–21, 23–15, 26–13

Arena Antonio Alexe
Attendance: 75

7 August 2026
19:30

Boxscore

France	93–68	Slovenia
Scoring by quarter: 25–17, 24–18, 22–18, 22–15

Arena Antonio Alexe
Attendance: 63

8 August 2026
14:30

Boxscore

Belgium	61–85	France
Scoring by quarter: 12–24, 16–22, 13–15, 20–24

Oradea Arena
Attendance: 70

8 August 2026
19:30

Boxscore

Slovenia	93–70	Germany
Scoring by quarter: 29–19, 17–24, 26–14, 21–13

Oradea Arena
Attendance: 150

9 August 2026
17:00

Boxscore

Slovenia	80–67	Belgium
Scoring by quarter: 19–19, 24–14, 19–13, 18–21

Arena Antonio Alexe
Attendance: 74

9 August 2026
19:30

Boxscore

Germany	58–87	France
Scoring by quarter: 15–32, 11–15, 17–22, 15–18

Arena Antonio Alexe
Attendance: 103

== Final round ==
=== Main bracket ===
Round of 16
11 August
A1 Lithuania	80
B4 Italy	72
11 August
C2 Israel	75
D3 Germany	78
11 August
B2 Turkey	62
A3 Romania	71
11 August
D1 France	89
C4 Georgia	54
11 August
A2 Poland	96
B3 Czech Republic	68
11 August
C1 Spain	97
D4 Belgium	60
11 August
B1 Latvia	99
A4 Serbia	59
11 August
D2 Slovenia	78
C3 Greece	83

Quarterfinals
12 August
A1 Lithuania	82
D3 Germany	75
12 August
A3 Romania	69
D1 France	108
12 August
A2 Poland	74
C1 Spain	86
12 August
B1 Latvia	92
C3 Greece	80

Semifinals
14 August
A1 Lithuania	82
D1 France	92
14 August
C1 Spain	87
B1 Latvia	92

Final
15 August
D1 France	69
B1 Latvia	75
Third place match
15 August
A1 Lithuania	93
C1 Spain	96

=== Round of 16 ===
11 August 2026
13:00

Boxscore

Poland	96–68	Czech Republic
Scoring by quarter: 34–20, 19–26, 18–15, 25–7

Arena Antonio Alexe
Attendance: 100

11 August 2026
13:00

Boxscore

Latvia	99–59	Serbia
Scoring by quarter: 23–12, 22–21, 25–9, 29–17

Oradea Arena
Attendance: 70

11 August 2026
15:30

Boxscore

Spain	97–60	Belgium
Scoring by quarter: 34–18, 21–10, 18–13, 24–19

Arena Antonio Alexe
Attendance: 55

11 August 2026
15:30

Boxscore

Slovenia	78–83	Greece
Scoring by quarter: 26–23, 16–21, 20–22, 16–17

Oradea Arena
Attendance: 89

11 August 2026
18:00

Boxscore

Lithuania	80–72	Italy
Scoring by quarter: 18–25, 20–15, 24–18, 18–14

Arena Antonio Alexe
Attendance: 115

11 August 2026
18:00

Boxscore

Turkey	62–71	Romania
Scoring by quarter: 18–24, 13–12, 15–11, 16–24

Oradea Arena
Attendance: 1,476

11 August 2026
20:30

Boxscore

Israel	75–78	Germany
Scoring by quarter: 25–29, 15–16, 19–19, 16–14

Arena Antonio Alexe
Attendance: 132

11 August 2026
20:30

Boxscore

France	89–54	Georgia
Scoring by quarter: 19–10, 22–15, 28–19, 20–10

Oradea Arena
Attendance: 178

=== 9th–16th place classification playoffs ===
9th–16th place quarterfinals
12 August
B4 Italy	86
C2 Israel	75
12 August
B2 Turkey	79
C4 Georgia	71
12 August
B3 Czech Republic (OT)	93
D4 Belgium	88
12 August
A4 Serbia (OT)	95
D2 Slovenia	91

9th–12th place semifinals
14 August
B4 Italy	60
B2 Turkey	82
14 August
B3 Czech Republic	63
A4 Serbia	95

Ninth place match
15 August
B2 Turkey	73
A4 Serbia	75
Eleventh place match
15 August
B4 Italy	82
B3 Czech Republic	90

13th–16th place semifinals
14 August
C2 Israel	91
C4 Georgia	72
14 August
D4 Belgium	85
D2 Slovenia	82

Thirteenth place match
15 August
C2 Israel	85
D4 Belgium	68
Fifteenth place match
15 August
C4 Georgia	66
D2 Slovenia	67

==== 9th–16th place quarterfinals ====
12 August 2026
13:00

Boxscore

Czech Republic	93–88 (OT)	Belgium
Scoring by quarter: 16–23, 27–17, 22–24, 18–19, Overtime: 10–5

Oradea Arena
Attendance: 50

12 August 2026
15:30

Boxscore

Serbia	95–91 (OT)	Slovenia
Scoring by quarter: 27–22, 24–19, 10–23, 20–17, Overtime: 14–10

Arena Antonio Alexe
Attendance: 50

12 August 2026
18:00

Boxscore

Turkey	79–71	Georgia
Scoring by quarter: 25–27, 20–17, 15–12, 19–15

Arena Antonio Alexe
Attendance: 65

12 August 2026
20:30

Boxscore

Italy	86–75	Israel
Scoring by quarter: 16–21, 20–25, 24–11, 26–18

Arena Antonio Alexe
Attendance: 104

==== 13th–16th place semifinals ====
14 August 2026
13:00

Boxscore

Israel	91–72	Georgia
Scoring by quarter: 28–21, 18–18, 16–15, 29–18

Arena Antonio Alexe
Attendance: 80

14 August 2026
15:30

Boxscore

Belgium	85–82	Slovenia
Scoring by quarter: 19–21, 18–22, 30–23, 18–16

Arena Antonio Alexe
Attendance: 150

==== Fifteenth place match ====
15 August 2026
11:00

Boxscore

Georgia	66–67	Slovenia
Scoring by quarter: 15–17, 11–19, 26–14, 14–17

Arena Antonio Alexe
Attendance: 60

==== Thirteenth place match ====
15 August 2026
15:30

Boxscore

Israel	85–68	Belgium
Scoring by quarter: 24–8, 22–15, 18–26, 21–19

Oradea Arena
Attendance: 200

==== 9th–12th place semifinals ====
14 August 2026
18:00

Boxscore

Italy	60–82	Turkey
Scoring by quarter: 8–12, 19–23, 15–27, 18–20

Arena Antonio Alexe
Attendance: 69

14 August 2026
20:30

Boxscore

Czech Republic	63–95	Serbia
Scoring by quarter: 13–23, 17–20, 12–30, 21–22

Arena Antonio Alexe
Attendance: 84

==== Eleventh place match ====
15 August 2026
13:30

Boxscore

Italy	82–90	Czech Republic
Scoring by quarter: 22–28, 21–13, 13–23, 26–26

Arena Antonio Alexe
Attendance: 50

==== Ninth place match ====
15 August 2026
16:00

Boxscore

Turkey	73–75	Serbia
Scoring by quarter: 16–22, 20–23, 22–15, 15–15

Arena Antonio Alexe
Attendance: 50

=== Quarterfinals ===
12 August 2026
13:00

Boxscore

Poland	74–86	Spain
Scoring by quarter: 17–21, 25–20, 17–18, 15–27

Oradea Arena
Attendance: 250

12 August 2026
15:30

Boxscore

Latvia	92–80	Greece
Scoring by quarter: 21–25, 24–17, 22–19, 25–19

Oradea Arena
Attendance: 480

12 August 2026
18:00

Boxscore

Romania	69–108	France
Scoring by quarter: 15–20, 22–30, 21–31, 11–27

Oradea Arena
Attendance: 1,883

12 August 2026
20:30

Boxscore

Lithuania	82–75	Germany
Scoring by quarter: 23–18, 23–11, 20–19, 16–27

Oradea Arena
Attendance: 354

=== 5th–8th place classification playoffs ===
5th–8th place semifinals
14 August
D3 Germany	79
A3 Romania	52
14 August
A2 Poland	84
C3 Greece	102

Fifth place match
15 August
D3 Germany	85
C3 Greece	77
Seventh place match
15 August
A3 Romania	62
A2 Poland	88

==== 5th–8th place semifinals ====
14 August 2026
9:00

Boxscore

Poland	84–102	Greece
Scoring by quarter: 23–18, 19–29, 30–28, 12–27

Oradea Arena
Attendance: 300

14 August 2026
11:30

Boxscore

Germany	79–52	Romania
Scoring by quarter: 18–11, 23–13, 19–16, 19–12

Oradea Arena
Attendance: 893

==== Seventh place match ====
15 August 2026
18:30

Boxscore

Romania	62–88	Poland
Scoring by quarter: 12–26, 18–17, 13–33, 19–12

Arena Antonio Alexe
Attendance: 104

==== Fifth place match ====
15 August 2026
13:00

Boxscore

Germany	85–77	Greece
Scoring by quarter: 18–15, 26–24, 20–21, 21–17

Oradea Arena
Attendance: 69

=== Semifinals ===
14 August 2026
14:00

Boxscore

Lithuania	82–92	France
Scoring by quarter: 17–26, 20–21, 33–22, 12–23

Oradea Arena
Attendance: 252

14 August 2026
16:30

Boxscore

Spain	87–92	Latvia
Scoring by quarter: 22–18, 24–28, 26–28, 15–18

Oradea Arena
Attendance: 300

=== Third place match ===
15 August 2026
17:15

Boxscore

Lithuania	93–96	Spain
Scoring by quarter: 19–31, 16–29, 27–24, 31–12

Oradea Arena
Attendance: 247

=== Final ===
15 August 2026
20:15

Boxscore

France	69–75	Latvia
Scoring by quarter: 21–19, 12–13, 11–24, 25–19

Oradea Arena
Attendance: 2147

== Final standings ==
Rank	Team	Record
1st place, gold medalist(s)	Latvia	7–0
2nd place, silver medalist(s)	France	6–1
3rd place, bronze medalist(s)	Spain	6–1
4	Lithuania	5–2
5	Germany	4–3
6	Greece	3–4
7	Poland	4–3
8	Romania	2–5
9	Serbia	3–4
10	Turkey	4–3
11	Czech Republic	3–4
12	Italy	1–6
13	Israel	4–3
14	Belgium	1–6
15	Slovenia	3–4
16	Georgia	0–7

Relegated to the 2027 FIBA U16 EuroBasket Division B
