= 1995 FIBA Europe Under-16 Championship qualification =

The qualification competition for the 1995 FIBA Europe Under-16 Championship consisted in two different qualification rounds: the Qualifying Round and the Challenge Round. Russia, Turkey and Lithuania, as third, fourth and fifth place in the previous tournament, received a bye to the Challenge Round. Greece, as title holder, Spain, as runner-up, and Portugal, as the host, qualified directly for the tournament.

== Qualifying round ==
Twenty-five national teams entered in this round. They were allocated in five groups of five teams each. The top three teams advanced to the Challenge Round, where they joined Russia, Turkey and Lithuania.

Team advanced to the challenge round

Teams in italics hosted the mini-tournament.

=== Group A ===
The matches were played on April 20–24, 1994.

Team	Pld	W	L	PF	PA	Pts
Israel	4	4	0	258	181	8
Bulgaria	4	3	1	229	217	7
Cyprus	4	2	2	197	230	6
Poland	4	1	3	226	250	5
Austria	4	0	4	227	259	4

=== Group B ===
The matches were played on April 6–10, 1994.

Team	Pld	W	L	PF	PA	Pts
Czech Republic	4	3	1	311	231	7
Ukraine	4	3	1	325	292	7
Germany	4	3	1	277	243	7
Luxembourg	4	1	3	244	342	5
Iceland	4	0	4	256	305	4

=== Group C ===
The matches were played on April 20–24, 1994.

Team	Pld	W	L	PF	PA	Pts
Croatia	4	4	0	325	188	8
Finland	4	3	1	260	249	7
England	4	2	2	235	216	6
Hungary	4	1	3	237	294	5
Georgia	4	0	4	225	335	4

=== Group D ===
The matches were played on April 20–24, 1994.

Team	Pld	W	L	PF	PA	Pts
Macedonia	4	4	0	262	171	8
Romania	4	3	1	271	234	7
France	4	2	2	220	225	6
Slovakia	4	1	3	200	245	5
Estonia	4	0	4	173	251	4

=== Group E ===
The matches were played on April 20–24, 1994.

Team	Pld	W	L	PF	PA	Pts
Italy	4	4	0	322	202	8
Slovenia	4	3	1	342	216	7
Belgium	4	2	2	230	206	6
Belarus	4	1	3	197	351	5
Switzerland	4	0	4	176	292	4

== Challenge round ==
The fifteen national teams entering from the Qualifying Round joined Russia, Turkey and Lithuania in this round. The eighteen teams were allocated in three groups of six teams each. The three top teams of each group advanced to the final tournament, where they joined Greece, Spain, and Portugal.

Team advanced to the 1995 FIBA Europe Under-16 Championship

Teams in italics hosted the mini-tournament.

=== Group A ===
Team	Pld	W	L	PF	PA	Pts
Macedonia	5	5	0	365	286	10
Israel	5	4	1	312	309	9
England	5	2	3	333	338	7
Germany	5	2	3	285	317	7
Russia	5	1	4	346	357	6
Belgium	5	1	4	276	310	6

=== Group B ===
Team	Pld	W	L	PF	PA	Pts
Croatia	5	5	0	293	201	10
Czech Republic	5	3	2	272	278	8
Italy	5	3	2	251	245	8
Romania	5	3	2	293	269	8
Cyprus	5	1	4	242	294	6
Lithuania	5	0	5	0	64	0

=== Group C ===
Team	Pld	W	L	PF	PA	Pts
Turkey	5	5	0	362	302	10
France	5	4	1	340	301	9
Finland	5	3	2	333	333	8
Slovenia	5	2	3	369	376	7
Ukraine	5	1	4	373	385	6
Bulgaria	5	0	5	314	394	5
