= Georgia men's national under-16 basketball team =

Georgia
- FIBA zone: FIBA Europe
- National federation: Georgian Basketball Federation

U17 World Cup
- Appearances: None

U16 EuroBasket
- Appearances: 10
- Medals: None

U16 EuroBasket Division B
- Appearances: 14
- Medals: Silver: 1 (2006); Bronze: 3 (2005, 2017, 2023)

The Georgia men's national under-16 basketball team is a national basketball team of Georgia, administered by the Georgian Basketball Federation. It represents the country in international under-16 men's basketball competitions.

== FIBA U16 EuroBasket record ==
Division A						Division B					
Year	Pos.	Pld.	W	L	Ref.	Year	Pos.	Pld.	W	L	Ref.
1971–1991	Part of the Soviet Union					1971–2003	Not held				
(Turkey) 1993	Did not participate					1971–2003	Not held				
(Portugal) 1995	Did not qualify					1971–2003	Not held				
(Belgium) 1997	9th	7	3	4		1971–2003	Not held				
(Slovenia) 1999	7th	8	4	4		1971–2003	Not held				
(Latvia) 2001	11th	7	2	5		1971–2003	Not held				
(Spain) 2003	Did not qualify					1971–2003	Not held				
(Greece) 2004	15th	8	2	6		(England) 2004	(Played in Division A)				
(Spain) 2005	(Played in Division B)					(Bulgaria) 2005	3rd place, bronze medalist(s)	8	6	2	
(Spain) 2006	(Played in Division B)					(Estonia) 2006	2nd place, silver medalist(s)	9	6	3	
(Greece) 2007	12th	8	2	6		(North Macedonia) 2007	(Played in Division A)				
(Italy) 2008	16th	6	0	6		(Bosnia and Herzegovina) 2008	(Played in Division A)				
(Lithuania) 2009	(Played in Division B)					(Portugal) 2009	10th	7	3	4	
(Montenegro) 2010	(Played in Division B)					(Estonia) 2010	5th	8	7	1	
(Czech Republic) 2011	(Played in Division B)					(North Macedonia) 2011	16th	8	2	6	
(Lithuania) (Latvia) 2012	(Played in Division B)					(Romania) 2012	12th	8	3	5	
(Ukraine) 2013	(Played in Division B)					(Bosnia and Herzegovina) 2013	7th	9	4	5	
(Latvia) 2014	(Played in Division B)					(North Macedonia) 2014	10th	8	5	3	
(Lithuania) 2015	(Played in Division B)					(Bulgaria) 2015	5th	9	6	3	
(Poland) 2016	(Played in Division B)					(Bulgaria) 2016	12th	8	3	5	
(Montenegro) 2017	(Played in Division B)					(Bulgaria) 2017	3rd place, bronze medalist(s)	8	6	2	
(Serbia) 2018	16th	7	0	7		(Bosnia and Herzegovina) 2018	(Played in Division A)				
(Italy) 2019	(Played in Division B)					(Montenegro) 2019	20th	8	2	6	
(North Macedonia) 2022	(Played in Division B)					(Bulgaria) 2022	12th	8	3	5	
(North Macedonia) 2023	(Played in Division B)					(Romania) 2023	3rd place, bronze medalist(s)	7	5	2	
(Greece) 2024	13th	7	3	4		(North Macedonia) 2024	(Played in Division A)				
(Georgia (country)) 2025	11th	7	2	5		(North Macedonia) 2025	(Played in Division A)				
(Romania) 2026	16th	7	0	7		(North Macedonia) 2026	(Played in Division A)				

== See also ==
- Georgia men's national basketball team
- Georgia men's national under-18 basketball team
- Georgia women's national under-16 basketball team
