= Slovenia men's national under-16 and under-17 basketball team =

Slovenia
- Joined FIBA: 1992
- FIBA zone: FIBA Europe
- National federation: KZS
- Coach: Gregor Gornjec

U17 World Cup
- Appearances: 2

U16 EuroBasket
- Appearances: 16
- Medals: Bronze: 1 (2025)

U16 EuroBasket Division B
- Appearances: 8
- Medals: Gold: 1 (2011); Bronze: 2 (2010, 2016)
Home	Away

The Slovenia men's national under-16 and under-17 basketball team (Slovene: Slovenska košarkarska reprezentanca do 16 in mlajših od 17 let) is a national basketball team of Slovenia, administered by the Basketball Federation of Slovenia (Košarkarska zveza Slovenije). It represents the country in international under-16 and under-17 men's basketball competitions.

== Competitive record ==
=== FIBA U17 World Cup ===
Year	Pos.	Pld	W	L	Ref.
(Germany) 2010	Did not qualify				
(Lithuania) 2012	Did not qualify				
(United Arab Emirates) 2014	Did not qualify				
(Spain) 2016	Did not qualify				
(Argentina) 2018	Did not qualify				
(Spain) 2022	7th	7	4	3	
(Turkey) 2024	Did not qualify				
(Turkey) 2026	9th	7	3	4	
(Greece) 2028	To be determined				
Total	2/9	14	7	7	

=== FIBA U16 EuroBasket ===
Year	Pos.	Pld	W	L	Ref.
(Turkey) 1993	Did not participate				
(Portugal) 1995	Did not qualify				
(Belgium) 1997	7th	8	3	5	
(Slovenia) 1998	12th	7	1	6	
(Latvia) 2001	Did not qualify				
(Spain) 2003	6th	8	3	5	
(Greece) 2004	8th	8	4	4	
(Spain) 2005	12th	8	3	5	
(Spain) 2006	13th	8	3	5	
(Greece) 2007	15th	6	1	5	
(Italy) 2008	(Division B)				
(Lithuania) 2009	(Division B)				
(Montenegro) 2010	(Division B)				
(Czech Republic) 2011	(Division B)				
(Lithuania) (Latvia) 2012	14th	9	3	6	
(Ukraine) 2013	(Division B)				
(Latvia) 2014	(Division B)				
(Lithuania) 2015	(Division B)				
(Poland) 2016	(Division B)				
(Montenegro) 2017	10th	7	5	2	
(Serbia) 2018	13th	7	3	4	
(Italy) 2019	10th	7	3	4	
(North Macedonia) 2022	7th	7	4	3	
(North Macedonia) 2023	6th	7	4	3	
(Greece) 2024	12th	7	3	4	
(Georgia (country)) 2025	3rd	7	5	2	
(Romania) 2026	15th	7	3	4	
Total	16/27	118	51	67	

=== FIBA U16 EuroBasket Division B ===
Year	Pos.	Pld	W	L	Ref.
(Bosnia and Herzegovina) 2008	5th	9	8	1	
(Portugal) 2009	4th	8	6	2	
(Estonia) 2010	3rd	8	6	2	
(North Macedonia) 2011	1st	9	8	1	
(Bosnia and Herzegovina) 2013	4th	8	5	3	
(North Macedonia) 2014	6th	8	4	4	
(Bulgaria) 2015	7th	9	6	3	
(Bulgaria) 2016	3rd	8	7	1	
Total	8/20	67	50	17	

== See also ==
- Slovenia men's national basketball team
- Slovenia men's national under-20 basketball team
- Slovenia men's national under-19 basketball team
- Slovenia women's national under-17 basketball team
