= Serbia men's national under-16 basketball team =

Youth basketball team in Serbia

Serbia
- FIBA zone: FIBA Europe
- National federation: Basketball Federation of Serbia

U16 EuroBasket
- Appearances: 25
- Medals: Gold: 5 (1997, 1999, 2001, 2007, 2025); Silver: 1 (2013); Bronze: 5 (2006, 2009, 2012, 2017, 2024)

Serbia men's national under-16 basketball team
Medal record

Men's basketball

Representing FR Yugoslavia / Serbia and Montenegro / Serbia

FIBA Europe Under-16 Championship
Gold medal – first place	1997 Pepinster, Kortrijk & Quaregnon	
Gold medal – first place	1999 Polzela, Celje & Laško	
Gold medal – first place	2001 Riga	
Gold medal – first place	2003 Madrid	
Gold medal – first place	2007 Ierapetra, Rethymno & Heraklion	
Gold medal – first place	2025 Tbilisi	
Silver medal – second place	2013 Kyiv	
Bronze medal – third place	2006 Linares, Andújar & Martos	
Bronze medal – third place	2009 Kaunas	
Bronze medal – third place	2012 Panevėžys, Vilnius/Ventspils	
Bronze medal – third place	2017 Podgorica	
Bronze medal – third place	2024 Heraklion	

The Serbia men's national under-16 basketball team (Serbian Cyrillic: Кошаркашка репрезентација Србије до 16 година) is the boys' basketball team, administered by Basketball Federation of Serbia, that represents Serbia in international under-16 men's basketball competitions, consisting mainly of the FIBA U16 EuroBasket. The event was originally referred to as the FIBA Europe Championship for Cadets.

The national team played as FR Yugoslavia from 1993 to 2003, and as Serbia and Montenegro from 2004 to 2006.

== Individual awards ==
- Most Valuable Player
  - Aleksandar Gajić – 1999
  - Veljko Tomović – 2001
  - Nemanja Aleksandrov – 2003
  - Dejan Musli – 2007
  - Stefan Peno – 2013
- All-Tournament Team
  - Nikola Janković – 2010
  - Stefan Peno – 2013
  - Miloš Glišić – 2013
  - Marko Pecarski – 2016
  - Đorđe Pažin – 2017
- Statistical leaders: Points
  - Marko Pecarski – 2016
- Statistical leaders: Assists
  - Stevan Karapandžić – 2017
- Statistical leaders: Rebounds
  - Marko Pecarski – 2016

== U16 EuroBasket competitive record ==
=== Representing FR Yugoslavia / Serbia and Montenegro ===
Year	Pos.	GP	W	L	Ref.
1971–1991	Part of SFR Yugoslavia				
As (Federal Republic of Yugoslavia) FR Yugoslavia
(Turkey) 1993	Suspended				
(Portugal) 1995	Did not participate				
(Belgium) 1997	1st place, gold medalist(s)	8	5	3	
(Slovenia) 1999	1st place, gold medalist(s)	8	8	0	
(Latvia) 2001	1st place, gold medalist(s)	8	7	1	
As Serbia and Montenegro
(Spain) 2003	1st place, gold medalist(s)	8	8	0	
(Greece) 2004	9th	8	5	3	
(Spain) 2005	10th	8	4	4	
(Spain) 2006	3rd place, bronze medalist(s)	8	5	3	
Total	7/9	56	42	14	

=== Representing Serbia ===
Year	Pos.	GP	W	L	Ref.
(Greece) 2007	1st place, gold medalist(s)	8	8	0	
(Italy) 2008	5th	8	5	3	
(Lithuania) 2009	3rd place, bronze medalist(s)	9	5	4	
(Montenegro) 2010	5th	9	7	2	
(Czech Republic) 2011	9th	8	5	3	
(Lithuania) / (Latvia) 2012	3rd place, bronze medalist(s)	9	7	2	
(Ukraine) 2013	2nd place, silver medalist(s)	9	7	2	
(Latvia) 2014	6th	9	7	2	
(Lithuania) 2015	8th	9	4	5	
(Poland) 2016	10th	7	3	4	
(Montenegro) 2017	3rd place, bronze medalist(s)	7	5	2	
(Serbia) 2018	5th	7	5	2	
(Italy) 2019	7th	7	4	3	
(North Macedonia) 2020	Cancelled (Note: The tournaments were cancelled due to COVID-19 pandemic in Europe. Instead, there were held the FIBA U16 European Challengers in 2021.)				
(North Macedonia) 2021	Cancelled				
(North Macedonia) 2022	13th	7	4	3	
(North Macedonia) 2023	7th	7	3	4	
(Greece) 2024	3rd place, bronze medalist(s)	7	6	1	
(Georgia (country)) 2025	1st place, gold medalist(s)	7	6	1	
(Romania) 2026	9th	7	3	4	
Total	18/18	141	94	46	

== Coaches ==
=== FR Yugoslavia / Serbia and Montenegro ===
Years	Head coach	Assistant coach(es)
1997	Veselin Matić	—N/a
1999	Petar Rodić	Aleksandar Džikić
2001	Stevan Karadžić	Dejan Mijatović
2003	Miodrag Kadija	—N/a
2004–2005	Petar Rodić	Milan Ristić, Marko Ćosić
2006	Aleksandar Bućan	—N/a

=== Serbia ===
Years	Head coach	Assistant coach(es)
2007–2008	Dragan Vaščanin	Marko Vučković
2009	Nenad Trunić	Marko Simonović
2010–2011	Saša Nikitović	Goran Tadić, Vladimir Ružičić
2012	Marko Ičelić	Vanja Guša, Miloš Obrenović, Nikola Marković
2013	Vanja Guša	Milan Josić, Đorđe Šijan, Filip Socek
2014–2015	Vladimir Đokić	Dušan Alimpijević, Mihajlo Šušić, Bojan Salatić
2016	Milan Josić	Dušan Stojkov, Zoran Vraneš
2017	Slobodan Klipa	Vladimir Jovanović, Bojan Simanić, Zoran Vraneš
2018	Vlada Vukoičić	Đorđe Adžić, Stefan Bulatović, Branko Knežević
2019	Saša Nikitović	Branislav Vićentić, Miroslav Milić
2021	Dragoljub Avramović	Bojan Salatić, Viktor Antić, Marko Spasić
2022	Aleksandar Glišić	Nemanja Varničić, Vladimir Nestorović, Ivan Pavlović

== Past rosters ==
=== Representing FY Yugoslavia / Serbia and Montenegro ===
1997 Championship	1999 Championship	2001 Championship	2003 Championship	2004 Championship	2005 Championship	2006 Championship
Slavko Stefanović; Slobodan Tošić; Ivan Vukadinov; Mladen Šekularac; Andrija Crnogorac; Vladimir Tica; Marko Peković; Vladimir Rončević; Sreten Lakonić; Predrag Sojić; Luka Lazukić; Petar Jovanović	Jovan Stefanov; Bojan Bakić; Aleksandar Gajić; Strahinja Zgonjanin; Nemanja Matović; Miloš Pavlović; Dušan Đorđević; Mirko Kovač; Miloš Nišavić; Srđan Bulatović; Ivan Andonov; Tomislav Tomović	Stefan Majstorović; Mlađen Šljivančanin; Vukašin Aleksić; Srđan Živković; Dušan Vučićević; Vladimir Micov; Veljko Tomović; Darko Miličić; Vladimir Mašulović; Kosta Perović; Milovan Raković; Luka Bogdanović	Miloš Teodosić; Milenko Tepić; Stefan Nikolić; Marko Đurković; Dragan Labović; Nenad Mijatović; Dušan Trajković; Nenad Zivčević; Nemanja Aleksandrov; Branko Jereminov; Nikola Dragović; Boban Medenica	Nikola Koprivica; Petar Despotović; Slobodan Dunđerski; Stefan Novoselski; Nikola Bakraclić; Danilo Šibalić; Dušan Vujović; Stefan Marković; Bojan Mihajlović; Miroslav Raduljica; Marko Kešelj; Vladimir Dašić	Stefan Živanović; Nikola Lalić; Filip Čović; Stefan Balmazović; Ivan Smiljanić; Dušan Katnić; Stefan Stojačić; Petar Čečur; Milan Mačvan; Milojko Vasilić; Stefan Đorđević; Nikola Maravić	Nedeljko Bogdanović; Filip Šepa; Nikša Nikolić; Bogdan Riznić; Aleksandar Vlahović; Nemanja Arnautović; Aleksandar Mitrović; Uroš Petrović; Bojan Subotić; Nenad Grujo; Branislav Đekić; Dejan Musli

=== Representing Serbia ===
2007 Championship	2008 Championship	2009 Championship	2010 Championship	2011 Championship	2012 Championship
Nemanja Jaramaz; Aleksandar Ponjavić; Nikša Nikolić; Aleksandar Obradović; Nikola Vukasović; Stevan Lekić; Danilo Anđušić; Lazar Radosavljević; Bogdan Jovanović; Nikola Rondović; Branislav Đekić; Dejan Musli	Strahinja Mladenović; Bogić Vujošević; Aleksandar Cvetković; Vukašin Petković; Nikola Sićević; Luka Igrutinović; Aleksandar Radenković; Nikola Silađi; Nemanja Bešović; Đorđe Drenovac; Stefan Nastić; Božo Đumić	Nikola Pavlović; Nikola Radičević; Aleksandar Cvetković; Stefan Popovski-Turanjanin; Saša Avramović; Luka Mitrović; Nenad Miljenović; Nemanja Krstić; Vukašin Vujović; Đorđe Milošević; Nemanja Bezbradica; Marko Ćirović	Nikola Radičević; Mladen Đorđević; Stefan Pot; Luka Anđušić; Vasilije Micić; Nikola Čvorović; Stefan Zorbas; Nikola Janković; Nikola Majić; Dušan Ristić; Miloš Janković; Nikola Milutinov	Ognjen Jaramaz; Nikola Rebić; Vasilije Pušica; Brano Đukanović; Marko Gudurić; Dušan Majstorović; Luka Popović; Đorđe Simeunović; Marko Tejić; Đorđe Kaplanović; Đoko Šalić; Dušan Ristić	Stefan Peno; Ilija Đoković; Ivan Daskalović; Vukan Stojanović; Slobodan Jovanović; Dušan Kovačević; Jovan Starinčević; Marko Radovanović; Nikola Pavlović; Miloš Glišić; Vasilije Vučetić; Stefan Lazarević

2013 Championship	2014 Championship	2015 Championship	2016 Championship	2017 Championship	2018 Championship
Stefan Peno; Nikola Ćirković; Vanja Marinković; Miloš Glišić; Nikola Rakićević; Vojislav Stojanović; Slobodan Jovanović; Boriša Simanić; Filip Aničić; Stefan Kenić; Aleksandar Aranitović; David Miladinović	Andrija Marjanović; Bojan Nešić; Lazar Nikolić; Aleksandar Aranitović; Novak Musić; Haris Ćućović; Dušan Beslać; Boriša Simanić; Aleksa Radanov; Matija Radović; Nemanja Dinčić; Srećko Gašić	Aleksa Uskoković; Mario Kovačević; Tadija Tadić; Vuk Vulikić; Boris Latinović; Andrija Marjanović; Aleksa Matić; Miloš Novaković; Filip Petrušev; Pavle Mihajloski; Miloš Stajčić; Marko Pecarski	Mihailo Stojanov; Uroš Isailović; Lazar Vasić; Toma Vasiljević; Bogdan Nedeljković; Dalibor Ilić; Zoran Paunović; Alen Smailagić; Filip Petrušev; Lazar Živanović; Mateja Jovanović; Marko Pecarski	1 Novak Mišković; 3 Marko Andrić; 5 Marko Pavićević; 6 Stevan Karapandžić; 7 Đorđe Pažin; 8 Stefan Agoč; 9 Lazar Živanović; 10 Lazar Vasić; 11 Aleksandar Langović; 13 Aleksa Marković; 14 Dušan Tanasković; 15 Nemanja Popović	0 Vojin Ivković; 1 Luka Paunović; 5 Nikola Manojlović; 9 Stefan Agoč; 10 Marko Andrić; 11 Lazar Stefanović; 13 Matija Svetozarević; 15 Mihailo Mušikić; 21 Luka Tarlać; 27 Filip Škobalj; 34 Lazar Joksimović; 99 Ivan Pavićević

2019 Championship	2021 Challengers	2022 Championship
1 Nikola Đurišić; 2 Nikola Radovanović; 3 Vuk Bošković; 3 Ilija Milijašević; 6 Stefan Stefanović; 8 Marko Marković; 9 Nikola Šaranović; 10 Mihajlo Petrović; 11 Matija Belić; 15 Filip Branković; 17 Aleksa Obradović; 20 Stefan Dabović	5 Asim Đulović; 7 Andrej Mušicki; 8 Mitar Bošnjaković; 12 Pavle Mišić; 12 Petar Avlijaš; 13 Matija Milošević; 14 Nikola Topić; 15 Danilo Dožić; 16 Ognjen Stanković; 19 Filip Malešević; 20 Lazar Tasić; 35 Lazar Gačić	2 Uroš Ivković; 4 Miroslav Bogdanović; 5 Savo Drezgić; 6 Aleksandar Goljović; 7 Ognjen Radošić; 9 Peter Milosavčević; 10 Miloš Šojić; 12 Filip Ružičić; 13 Uroš Romčević; 14 Vladimir Popović; 15 Stefan Plisnić; 23 Almir Asani

== See also ==
- Serbian men's university basketball team
- Serbia men's national under-20 basketball team
- Serbia men's national under-19 basketball team
- Serbia men's national under-18 basketball team
- Serbia men's national under-17 basketball team
