= Israel men's national under-16 basketball team =

Israeli Youth Basketball Team

Israel
- FIBA zone: FIBA Europe
- National federation: Israel Basketball Association

U17 World Cup
- Appearances: None

U16 EuroBasket
- Appearances: 30
- Medals: Bronze: 1 (1997)

U16 EuroBasket Division B
- Appearances: 5
- Medals: Silver: 2 (2014, 2016)

The Israel men's national under-16 basketball team is a national basketball team of Israel, administered by the Israel Basketball Association. It represents the country in international under-16 men's basketball competitions.

== FIBA U16 EuroBasket record ==
Division A						Division B					
Year	Pos.	GP	W	L	Ref.	Year	Pos.	GP	W	L	Ref.
(Italy) 1971	6th	7	4	3							
(Italy) 1973	6th	9	4	5							
(Greece) 1975	11th	8	5	3							
(France) 1977	11th	7	2	5							
(Syria) 1979	Did not qualify										
(Greece) 1981	8th	7	3	4							
(West Germany) 1983	Did not qualify										
(Bulgaria) 1985	7th	7	4	3							
(Hungary) 1987	9th	7	3	4							
(Spain) 1989	7th	7	3	4							
(Greece) 1991	6th	7	3	4							
(Turkey) 1993	8th	7	2	5							
(Portugal) 1995	8th	7	2	5							
(Belgium) 1997	3rd place, bronze medalist(s)	8	5	3							
(Slovenia) 1999	Did not qualify										
(Latvia) 2001	9th	7	2	5							
(Spain) 2003	10th	7	2	5							
(Greece) 2004	11th	8	4	4							
(Spain) 2005	9th	8	5	3							
(Spain) 2006	7th	8	3	5							
(Greece) 2007	11th	8	2	6							
(Italy) 2008	11th	8	3	5							
(Lithuania) 2009	13th	6	4	2							
(Montenegro) 2010	15th	9	4	5							
(Czech Republic) 2011	Did not qualify					(North Macedonia) 2011	4th	8	4	4	
(Latvia) (Lithuania) 2012	Did not qualify					(Romania) 2012	6th	8	5	3	
(Ukraine) 2013	Did not qualify					(Bosnia and Herzegovina) 2013	9th	8	6	2	
(Latvia) 2014	Did not qualify					(North Macedonia) 2014	2nd place, silver medalist(s)	8	7	1	
(Lithuania) 2015	15th	9	3	6							
(Poland) 2016	Did not qualify					(Bulgaria) 2016	2nd place, silver medalist(s)	8	7	1	
(Montenegro) 2017	11th	7	4	3							
(Serbia) 2018	10th	7	3	4							
(Italy) 2019	11th	7	4	3							
(North Macedonia) 2020	Cancelled due to coronavirus pandemic in North Macedonia										
(North Macedonia) 2021	Cancelled due to coronavirus pandemic in North Macedonia										
(North Macedonia) 2022	5th	7	4	3							
(North Macedonia) 2023	13th	7	3	4							
(Greece) 2024	6th	7	4	3							
(Georgia (country)) 2025	13th	7	3	4							
(Romania) 2026	13th	7	4	3							

== See also ==
- Israel men's national basketball team
- Israel men's national under-18 basketball team
- Israel women's national under-16 basketball team
