= Luka Bogdanović =

Serbian basketball player (born 1985)

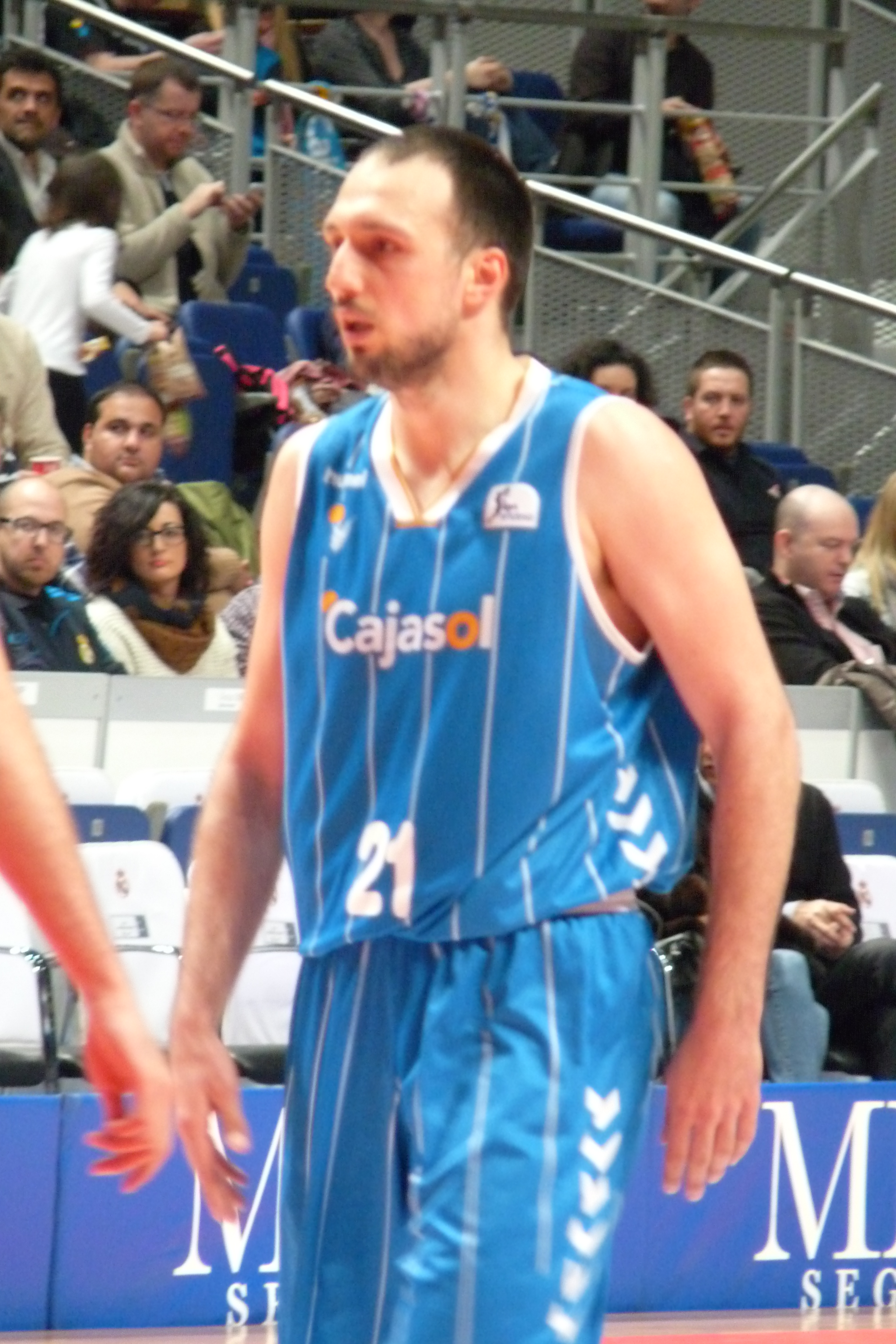
- Bogdanović with Sevilla in 2013.

Personal information
- Born: February 11, 1985 (age 41) Belgrade, SR Serbia, SFR Yugoslavia
- Listed height: 2.04 m (6 ft 8 in)
- Listed weight: 100 kg (220 lb)

Career information
- NBA draft: 2007: undrafted
- Playing career: 2002–2017
- Position: Small forward

Career history
- 2002–2004: Crvena zvezda
- 2004–2007: Partizan
- 2007–2008: Le Mans
- 2008–2010: Joventut
- 2010: Chorale Roanne
- 2010–2011: EWE Oldenburg
- 2011–2013: Cajasol
- 2013–2014: Türk Telekom
- 2014–2015: Partizan
- 2015–2016: Andorra
- 2016–2017: Joventut

Career highlights
- Adriatic League champion (2007); Basketball League of Serbia champion (2007); 2× Serbia and Montenegro League champion (2005, 2006); Serbian Cup winner (2004)
Medals
Men's basketball
Representing Serbia and Montenegro / FR Yugoslavia
U20 European Championship
Bronze medal – third place	2005 Russia	Team
European Championship for Cadets
Gold medal – first place	2001 Latvia	Team

Luka Bogdanović (Serbian: Лука Богдановић, born February 11, 1985) is a Serbian former professional basketball player who last played for Joventut Badalona of the Liga ACB. Standing at 2.04 m (6 ft 8 1/2 in), he plays at the small forward position.

== Professional career ==
Bogdanović started playing basketball in Sports Center "25th May". Later, he played for a few Belgrade-based clubs like Beovuk 72, BKK Radnički and Crvena zvezda. Under head coach Zmago Sagadin he saw playing time in the senior team of Crvena zvezda. In the season 2003–04 he won the Radivoj Korać Cup.

In July 2004, he moved to the arch-rivals Partizan. Over three years in Partizan, he won three Basketball League of Serbia championships and also appeared in 48 games of the Euroleague. With coming of Vladimir Micov, he lost his role in the team and saw little playing time, which eventually led to departure in 2007.

In the summer of 2007, he signed a contract with the French club Le Mans. In the 2007–08 Euroleague season, he had career-high 11.1 points and 1.2 assists per game. However, after just one season with Le Mans, he moved to DKV Joventut where he stayed for two seasons. In September 2010, he returned to France, signing contract with Chorale Roanne.

In December 2010, he signed a contract with the German club EWE Oldenburg for the rest of the season.

In June 2011, Bogdanović signed a two-year deal with Cajasol Sevilla. In July 2013, he signed a one-year contract with the Turkish club Türk Telekom.

In October 2014, Bogdanović returned to his former club Partizan. He signed an open contract with Serbian champion. In January 2015, he left Partizan and signed with BC Andorra of the Liga ACB for the rest of the season. On July 30, 2015, he re-signed with Andorra for one more season.

On August 3, 2016, Bogdanović returned to Joventut, signing a contract for the 2016–17 season.

== International career ==
As a member of the FR Yugoslavia under-16 national team, he won a gold medal at the 2001 EuroBasket. He was also part of the Serbia and Montenegro under-20 national team that won the bronze medal at the 2005 EuroBasket.

== Career statistics ==
Legend
GP	Games played	GS	Games started	MPG	Minutes per game
FG%	Field-goal percentage	3P%	3-point field-goal percentage	FT%	Free-throw percentage
RPG	Rebounds per game	APG	Assists per game	SPG	Steals per game
BPG	Blocks per game	PPG	Points per game	PIR	Performance index rating
**Bold**	Career high

=== Euroleague ===
Year	Team	GP	GS	MPG	FG%	3P%	FT%	RPG	APG	SPG	BPG	PPG	PIR
2004–05	Partizan	14	7	20.8	.422	.357	.810	3.5	.7	.6	.1	7.7	6.0
2005–06	Partizan	14	7	20.8	.373	.391	.800	**3.7**	.9	.7	**.2**	6.9	6.4
2006–07	Partizan	**20**	1	14.8	.444	**.475**	.867	3.1	.9	.5	.0	5.8	6.7
2007–08	Le Mans	14	**8**	**27.5**	.424	.433	.789	2.8	**1.2**	.3	.1	**11.1**	**9.2**
2008–09	Joventut	9	4	20.9	**.486**	.395	**1.000**	3.1	.7	**.8**	.1	10.0	8.3
Career		71	27	20.4	.428	.412	.828	3.2	.9	.5	.1	8.0	7.2

== Personal life ==
In June 2015, Bogdanović married fashion blogger Ana Ristić who's a cousin of Novak Djokovic's wife Jelena Ristić.
