= Marko Pecarski =

Serbian basketball player (born 2000)

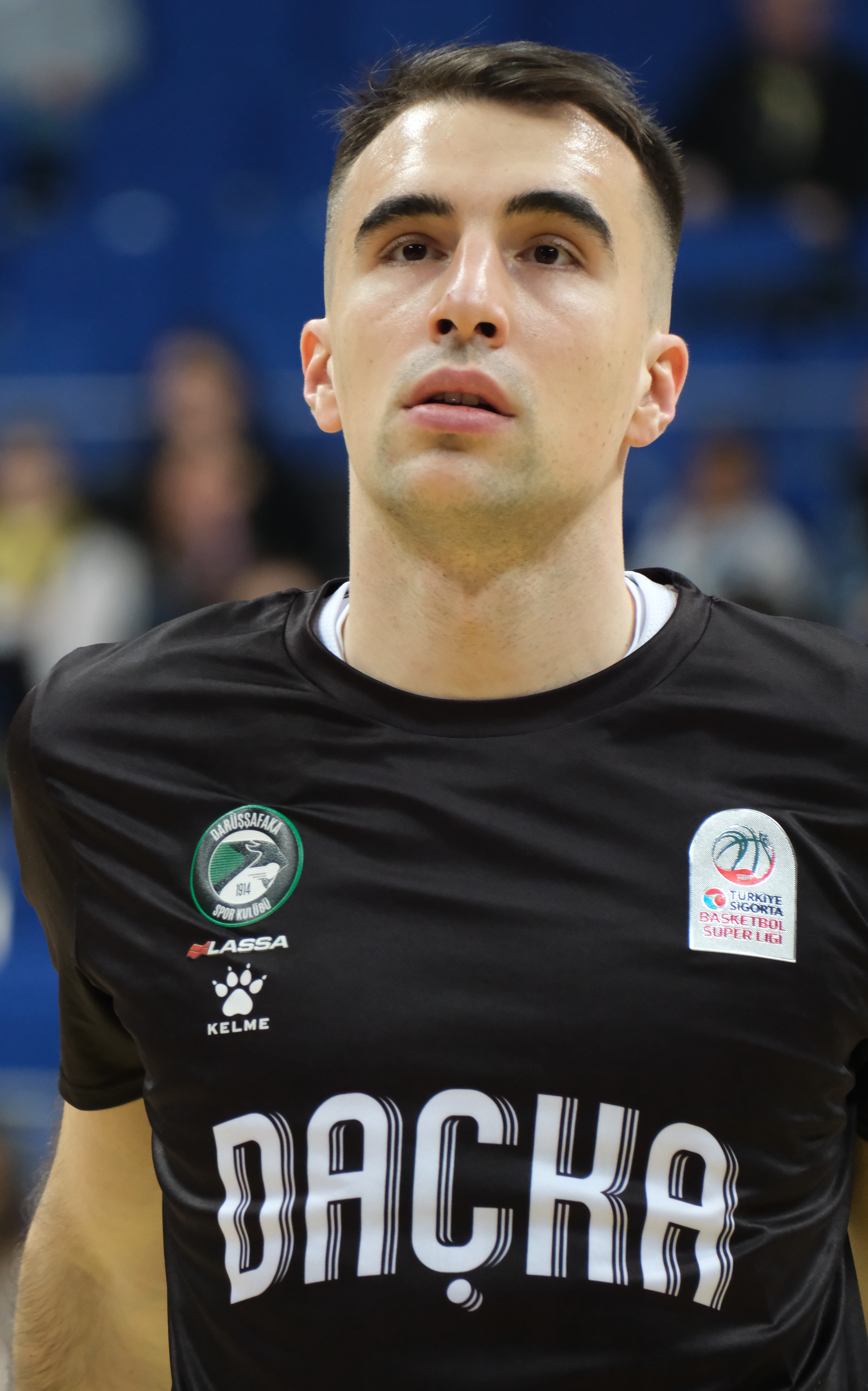
- Pecarski with Darüşşafaka in 2025

No. 5 – Yukatel Denizli Basket
- Position: Center / power forward
- League: BSL

Personal information
- Born: February 12, 2000 (age 26) Gijón, Spain
- Listed height: 2.08 m (6 ft 10 in)
- Listed weight: 106 kg (234 lb)

Career information
- NBA draft: 2022: undrafted
- Playing career: 2016–present

Career history
- 2017–2019: Partizan
- 2019–2021: FMP
- 2021–2022: Borac Čačak
- 2022–2023: Mornar Bar
- 2023–2024: Merkezefendi
- 2024: Lietkabelis
- 2025: Darüşşafaka
- 2025–2026: AEK Athens
- 2026–present: Denizli Basket

Career highlights
- 2× Serbian Cup winner (2018, 2019); Jordan Brand Classic (2016); Nike Hoop Summit (2019)
Medals
Men's basketball
Representing Serbia
FIBA Europe Under-18 Championship
Gold medal – first place	2017 Slovakia	U18 Team
Gold medal – first place	2018 Latvia	U18 Team

Marko Pecarski (Serbian Cyrillic: Марко Пецарски; born February 12, 2000) is a Serbian professional basketball player for Yukatel Denizli Basket of the Basketbol Süper Ligi.

== Early life and career ==
Pecarski was born in Gijón, Spain as his father Miroslav Pecarski was playing for Gijón of the Liga ACB. Marko grew up in his hometown Belgrade, playing for the Zemun youth system. Pecarski played Euroleague Basketball Next Generation Tournaments for the Zemun (2013–2014) and the Mega Leks (2015–2016). In April 2016, he participated at 2016 Jordan Brand Classic International Game. He made his debut in the Adriatic League, on 2 May 2016, at the age of 16, in a home loss to Crvena zvezda. In January 2017, he moved to Germany to play for reserve team of Bayern Munich of the German 3rd-tier level ProB. In August 2017, he attended Basketball Without Borders Europe Camp 16 in Netanya, Israel. Also, he attended the Basketball Without Borders Global Camp in El Segundo, California in February 2018.

== Professional career ==
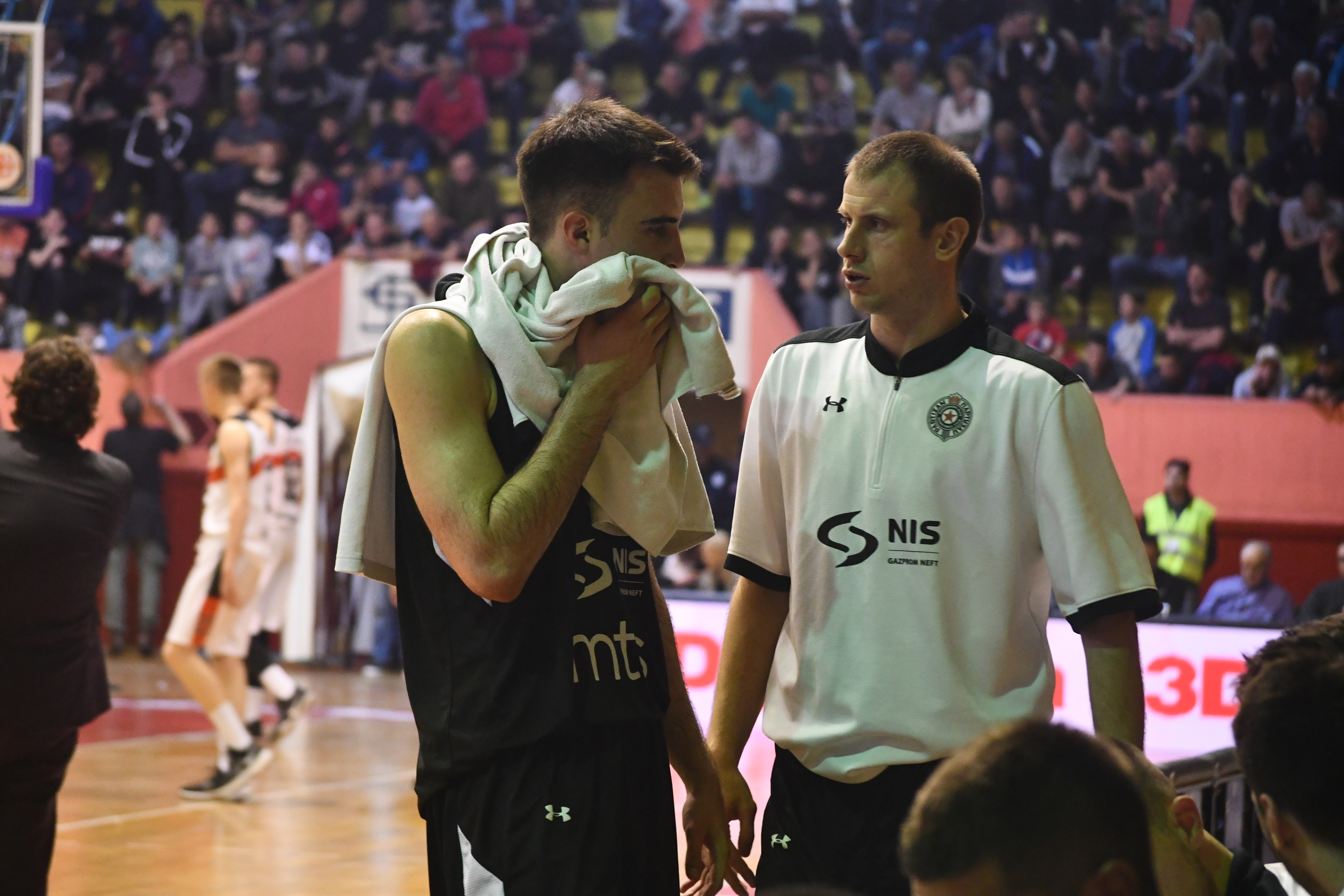
Pecarski (left) in 2019

On September 25, 2017, Pecarski signed a three-year contract with Partizan from Belgrade. Over 12 ABA League games in 2017–18 season, he averaged 4.2 points and 2.6 rebounds, while shooting 71% from the field goal. In August 2019, Pecarski parted ways with Partizan. On September 20, Pecarski officially parted ways with Partizan.

On September 20, 2019, Pecarski signed a three-year contract with FMP. Following the 2020–21 season Pecarski declared for the 2021 NBA draft. On July 14, 2021, he parted ways with FMP. On July 19, he withdrawn his name from consideration for the 2021 NBA draft.

On July 27, 2021, Pecarski signed a one-year contract with Borac Čačak.

On August 9, 2022, Pecarski signed a contract with Mornar Bar.

On August 13, 2023, he signed with Yukatel Merkezefendi of the Basketbol Süper Ligi (BSL).

On July 28, 2024, Pecarski signed one-year contract with Lietkabelis Panevėžys of the Lithuanian Basketball League (LKL) and the EuroCup. On 21 December, he parted ways with the club. On January 4, 2024, he joined Darüşşafaka for the rest of the season.

On July 30, 2025, he joined AEK Athens of the Greek Basketball League.

On August 13, 2026, he signed with Yukatel Denizli Basket of the Basketbol Süper Ligi (BSL).

== National team career ==
Pecarski was a member of the Serbia men's national under-16 teams at the two European Under-16 Championships. Over seven games at the 2016 Championship, he averaged 26.6 points, 15.9 rebounds and 0.9 assists per game and he was selected to the All-Tournament Team. He was the top scorer and the rebounds leader of the 2016 Championship. Before that, over nine games at the 2015 Championship, he averaged 12 points, 8.9 rebounds and 1.6 assists per game.

Pecarski was a member of the Serbian U-18 national basketball teams that won the gold medals at the 2017 Championship and the 2018 FIBA Europe Under-18 Championship. Over seven tournament games in 2017, he averaged 12.6 points, 8.3 rebounds and 0.7 assists per game. In 2018, he averaged 24.7 points, 11.0 rebounds and 2.3 assists per game over seven tournament games. He was the top scorer and the rebounds leader of the 2018 Championship. He was instrumental in the gold-medal game with a game-high 34 points, 13 rebounds and 1 assist, as Serbia defeated Latvia 99–90 after an excellent first-half performance. At the tournament's end, he picked up the Most Valuable Player award and got selected to the All-Tournament Team. Pecarski and Balša Koprivica played together for the national team and won a gold medal at the 2017 FIBA Europe Under-18 Championship. Thirty years ago, their fathers Miroslav Pecarski and Slaviša Koprivica played together for the national team and won a gold medal at the 1987 FIBA Under-19 World Championship.

Pecarski was a member of the Serbian under-19 team that finished 7th at the 2019 FIBA Under-19 Basketball World Cup in Heraklion, Greece. Over seven tournament games, he averaged 22.1 points and 8.6 rebounds per game. Pecarski was a member of the Serbian under-20 team that finished 15th at the 2019 FIBA U20 European Championship in Tel Aviv, Israel. Over six tournament games, he averaged 18.8 points and 8.8 rebounds per game.

== Individual awards ==
- FIBA Europe Under-18 Championship MVP – 2018
- FIBA Europe Under-18 Championship All-Tournament Team – 2018
- FIBA Europe Under-18 Championship Top scorer – 2018
- FIBA Europe Under-18 Championship Rebounds Leader – 2018
- FIBA Europe Under-16 Championship All-Tournament Team – 2016
- FIBA Europe Under-16 Championship Top scorer – 2016
- FIBA Europe Under-16 Championship Rebounds Leader – 2016
