= Nemanja Aleksandrov =

Serbian basketball player (born 1987)

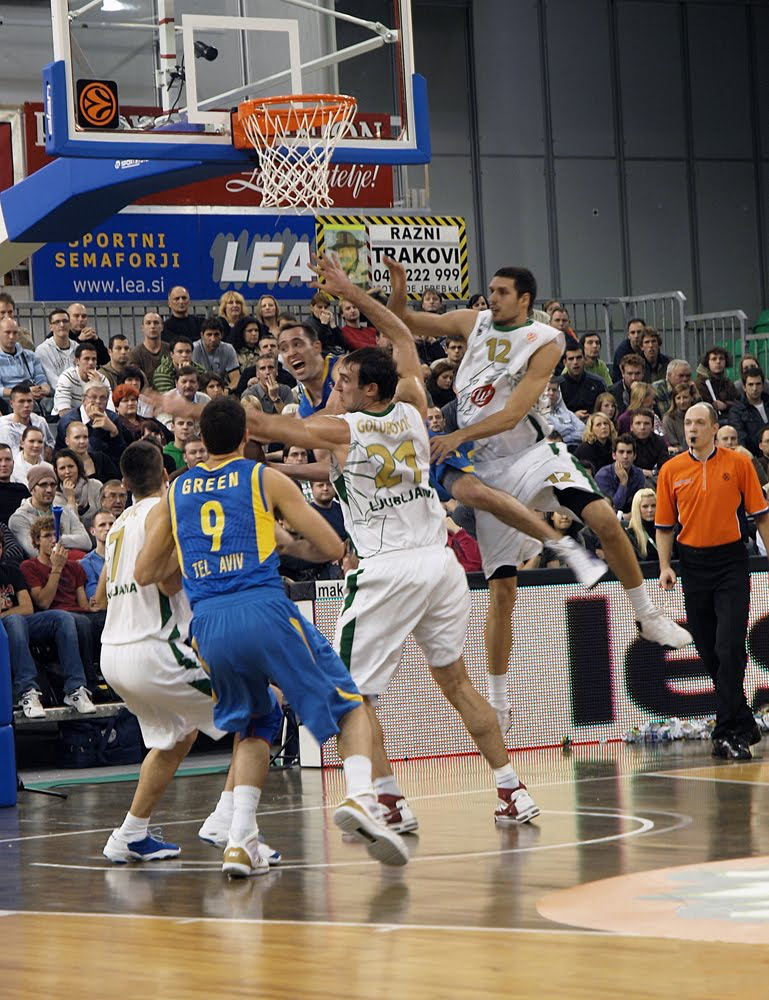
- Aleksandrov, first from the right, playing with Olimpija in December 2009.

Personal information
- Born: 10 April 1987 (age 39) Belgrade, SR Serbia, SFR Yugoslavia
- Listed height: 6 ft 11 in (2.11 m)
- Listed weight: 231 lb (105 kg)

Career information
- NBA draft: 2009: undrafted
- Playing career: 2002–2020
- Position: Power forward / small forward

Career history
- 2002–2006: FMP
- 2006–2008: Crvena zvezda
- 2009–2010: Olimpija Ljubljana
- 2010–2011: VL Pesaro
- 2012–2013: Verviers-Pepinster
- 2013: Manresa
- 2013–2016: Oldenburg
- 2016: Gaziantep
- 2016–2017: Eisbären Bremerhaven
- 2017–2018: Craiova
- 2018–2020: Jászberényi

Career highlights
- Adriatic League champion (2004); Serbian Cup winner (2005); Slovenian Cup winner (2010); Slovenian Supercup winner (2009); German Cup winner (2015); Europe U-16 Championship MVP (2003); 2× Nike Hoop Summit game (2005, 2007)
Medals
Men's basketball
Representing Serbia and Montenegro
European Championship for Cadets
Gold medal – first place	2003 Spain	Team

Nemanja Aleksandrov (Serbian Cyrillic: Немања Александров, born 10 April 1987) is a Serbian former professional basketball player. He represented the Serbian national basketball team internationally. Standing at the height of 2.10 m (6 ft 11 in), he played at the power forward and small forward positions.

== Professional career ==
=== FMP (2002–06) ===
Aleksandrov started his professional basketball career with FMP Železnik in 2002–03 season. During the 2004–05 season, he averaged 6 points, and 3 rebounds over 23 ABA League games, while shooting 48% from the field. At the time, he was considered a big international talent, even declaring for the 2005 NBA draft, but then withdrew his name due to ACL injury. He missed the entire 2005–06 season due to injury and parted ways with FMP Železnik at the end of the season.

=== Crvena zvezda (2006–08) ===
For the 2006–07 season, Aleksandrov signed a contract with Crvena zvezda. Aleksandrov debuted for the team against Bosna in December 2006. Over the season, he appeared in a total of 10 ABA League games, averaging 4.8 points and 3.1 rebounds on 40.5% shooting from the field. He stayed with Crvena zvezda until the end of 2007–08 season.

=== 2008–2012 ===
After missing the entire 2008–09 season due to injury, he signed with the Slovenian team Union Olimpija in the summer of 2009. Over 2009–10 season, he averaged 5.3 points and 2.8 rebounds over 25 ABA League games. After just one season in Slovenia, he left Union Olimpija because of unpaid salary, and signed a one-year contract with option to extend with the Italian team Scavolini Pesaro. In 2010–11 season, Aleksandrov appeared in 27 games, averaging 5.8 points and 3.3 rebounds for Scavolini Pesaro. He then spent the whole 2011–12 season working individually with the Serbian basketball coach Nenad Trajković.

=== 2012–2013 ===
On 12 August 2012, Aleksandrov signed with the Belgian team Verviers-Pepinster. With them, he averaged 15.8 points over 20 games during the season. In March 2013, he left Pepinster and signed with the Spanish club Bàsquet Manresa for the rest of the season. He averaged 9.4 points and 4.5 rebounds on 45.2% shooting from the field for Manresa over 10 games.

=== Oldenburg (2013–16) ===
In July 2013, German team EWE Baskets Oldenburg announced that they had signed Aleksandrov for two years. On 8 July 2015, he signed a one-year extension with the club.

=== 2016–2020 ===
On 13 October 2016, Aleksandrov signed with the Turkish team Gaziantep Basketbol. On 20 December 2016 he returned to Germany, signing with Basketball-Bundesliga outfit Eisbären Bremerhaven for the rest of the 2016–17 season.

== National team career ==
Aleksandrov won gold with Serbia and Montenegro national under-16 basketball team along with the tournament MVP award at the 2003 FIBA Europe Under-16 Championship, after averaging 20.3 points, 8.4 rebounds and 1.3 assist over 8 tournament games. In the same year, Aleksandrov received the "young athlete of the year" distinction in Serbia and Montenegro. At the 2004 FIBA Europe Under-18 Championship, he averaged 16.5 points and 9 rebounds over 13 tournament games, with Serbia and Montenegro national under-18 basketball team finishing the competition in fifth place.

He played with the senior Serbian national basketball team at the EuroBasket 2007, where in limited role he appeared in three group games in which Serbia was elimintated from the competition.

== See also ==
- List of Serbia men's national basketball team players

Awards
Preceded by Ivan Kolić (for FR Yugoslavia)	The Best Young Athlete of Serbia and Montenegro; 2003	Succeeded by Simon Vukčević
