= Greece men's national under-16 basketball team =

Greece
- Joined FIBA: 1932
- FIBA zone: FIBA Europe
- Coach: Kostas Papadopoulos

U16 EuroBasket
- Appearances: 36
- Medals: Gold: 2 (1989, 1993); Silver: 3 (1975, 1991, 1999); Bronze: 2 (1995, 2013)

U16 EuroBasket Division B
- Appearances: 1
- Medals: Gold: 1 (2017)
Home	Away

The Greece men's national under-16 basketball team, or Greek Cadets national basketball team, (Greek: Εθνική ομάδα καλαθοσφαίρισης Παίδων Ελλάδας) is the representative for Greece in international under-16 basketball competitions. It is organized and run by the Hellenic Basketball Federation (E.O.K.). The Greece men's national under-16 basketball team represents the country at the FIBA U16 EuroBasket.

== FIBA U16 EuroBasket record ==
Year	Position
(Italy) 1971	5th
(Italy) 1973	5th
(Greece) 1975	2nd
(France) 1977	8th
(Syria) 1979	9th
(Greece) 1981	7th
(Germany) 1983	4th
(Bulgaria) 1985	Did not participate
(Hungary) 1987	7th
(Spain) 1989	1st
(Greece) 1991	2nd
(Turkey) 1993	1st
(Portugal) 1995	3rd
(Belgium) 1997	5th
(Slovenia) 1999	2nd
(Latvia) 2001	6th
(Spain) 2003	8th
(Greece) 2004	5th
(Spain) 2005	13th

Year	Position
(Spain) 2006	9th
(Greece) 2007	7th
(Italy) 2008	12th
(Lithuania) 2009	14th
(Montenegro) 2010	10th
(Czech Republic) 2011	11th
(Lithuania) (Latvia) 2012	9th
(Ukraine) 2013	3rd
(Latvia) 2014	9th
(Lithuania) 2015	13th
(Poland) 2016	16th
(Bulgaria) 2017 Div. B	1st in Division B
(Serbia) 2018	6th
(Italy) 2019	6th
(North Macedonia) 2022	4th
(North Macedonia) 2023	8th
(Greece) 2024	4th
(Georgia (country)) 2025	10th
(Romania) 2026	6th
Total	36/38

== See also ==
- Greece men's national basketball team
- Greece men's national under-18 basketball team
- Greece men's national under-17 basketball team
- Greece women's national under-16 basketball team
