= Nikola Rondović =

Serbian basketball player

Personal information
- Born: 27 March 1991 (age 35) Bar, SR Montenegro, Yugoslavia
- Listed height: 2.07 m (6 ft 9 in)
- Listed weight: 102 kg (225 lb)

Career information
- NBA draft: 2013: undrafted
- Playing career: 2007–present
- Position: Power forward

Career history
- 2007, 2009–2010: Crvena zvezda
- 2010–2011: Superfund
- 2011–2012: Teodo Tivat
- 2012–2013: Mornar
- 2013–2014: Crnokosa
- 2014–2015: ETHA Engomis
- 2015: Tamiš
- 2016: OKK Beograd
- 2016–2017: Ibar
- 2017–2018: Teodo Tivat
- 2018–2019: Zlatibor
- 2019–2020: Gennevilliers BC
- 2020–2021: Cambrai Basket
Medals
Men's basketball
Representing Serbia
U18 European Championship
Gold medal – first place	2009 France	Team
U16 European Championship
Gold medal – first place	2007 Greece	Team

Nikola Rondović (Serbian Cyrillic: Никола Рондовић; born 27 March 1991) is a Serbian professional basketball player who last played for Cambrai Basket of the French NM2.

== Professional career ==
A power forward, Rondović played for Crvena zvezda, Superfund, Teodo Tivat, Mornar, Crnokosa, ETHA Engomis, Tamiš, OKK Beograd, Ibar, and Zlatibor.

In 2019, Rondović joined French team Gennevilliers BC of the French NM2. In 2020, he moved to Cambrai Basket of the same league.

== National team career ==
In July 2007, Rondović was a member of the Serbia U16 national team that won the gold medal at the FIBA Europe Under-16 Championship in Greece. Over eight tournament games, he averaged six points, 2.5 rebounds, and 0.8 assists per game. In July and August 2009, Rondović was a member of the Serbia U18 national team that won the gold medal at the FIBA Europe Under-18 Championship in France. Over nine tournament games, he averaged 6.3 points, 5.1 rebounds, and 1.9 assists per game. In July and August 2011, Rondović was a member of the Serbia U20 national team at the FIBA Europe Under-20 Championship in Bilbao, Spain. Over nine tournament games, he averaged 3.3 points and 1.9 rebounds per game.
