= Spain men's national under-16 basketball team =

Spain
- Joined FIBA: 1934
- FIBA zone: FIBA Europe
- National federation: FEB
- Coach: Daniel Miret

FIBA U16 EuroBasket
- Appearances: 38
- Medals: Gold: 6 (2006, 2009, 2013, 2016, 2019, 2023); Silver: 9 (1973, 1983, 1985, 1993, 1995, 2007, 2018, 2022, 2024); Bronze: 7 (1979, 1991, 2001, 2005, 2011, 2014, 2026)
| Home | Away |

The Spain men's national under-16 basketball team is the national representative for Spain in international under-16 men's basketball competitions. It is organized and run by the Spanish Basketball Federation. The team represents the country at the FIBA U16 EuroBasket and it is the only team that has participated in all editions of that competition.

They won their 6th title at the 2023 FIBA U16 European Championship.

== FIBA U16 EuroBasket record ==
| Year | Pos. | Pld | W | L |
|---|---|---|---|---|
| (Italy) 1971 | 4th | 7 | 4 | 3 |
| (Italy) 1973 | 2nd place, silver medalist(s) | 9 | 8 | 1 |
| (Greece) 1975 | 5th | 6 | 4 | 2 |
| (France) 1977 | 5th | 7 | 5 | 2 |
| (Syria) 1979 | 3rd place, bronze medalist(s) | 7 | 5 | 2 |
| (Greece) 1981 | 9th | 7 | 3 | 4 |
| (Germany) 1983 | 2nd place, silver medalist(s) | 7 | 5 | 2 |
| (Bulgaria) 1985 | 2nd place, silver medalist(s) | 7 | 5 | 2 |
| (Hungary) 1987 | 4th | 7 | 4 | 3 |
| (Spain) 1989 | 6th | 7 | 4 | 3 |
| (Greece) 1991 | 3rd place, bronze medalist(s) | 7 | 5 | 2 |
| (Turkey) 1993 | 2nd place, silver medalist(s) | 7 | 5 | 2 |
| (Portugal) 1995 | 2nd place, silver medalist(s) | 7 | 6 | 1 |
| (Belgium) 1997 | 6th | 8 | 5 | 3 |
| (Slovenia) 1999 | 8th | 8 | 3 | 5 |
| (Latvia) 2001 | 3rd place, bronze medalist(s) | 8 | 6 | 2 |
| (Spain) 2003 | 4th | 8 | 4 | 4 |
| (Greece) 2004 | 7th | 8 | 5 | 3 |
| (Spain) 2005 | 3rd place, bronze medalist(s) | 8 | 5 | 3 |

| Year | Pos. | Pld | W | L |
|---|---|---|---|---|
| (Spain) 2006 | 1st place, gold medalist(s) | 8 | 8 | 0 |
| (Greece) 2007 | 2nd place, silver medalist(s) | 8 | 6 | 2 |
| (Italy) 2008 | 6th | 8 | 5 | 3 |
| (Lithuania) 2009 | 1st place, gold medalist(s) | 9 | 7 | 2 |
| (Montenegro) 2010 | 4th | 9 | 6 | 3 |
| (Czech Republic) 2011 | 3rd place, bronze medalist(s) | 9 | 7 | 2 |
| (Lithuania) 2012 | 7th | 9 | 4 | 5 |
| (Ukraine) 2013 | 1st place, gold medalist(s) | 9 | 7 | 2 |
| (Latvia) 2014 | 3rd place, bronze medalist(s) | 9 | 4 | 5 |
| (Lithuania) 2015 | 4th | 9 | 6 | 3 |
| (Poland) 2016 | 1st place, gold medalist(s) | 7 | 7 | 0 |
| (Montenegro) 2017 | 7th | 7 | 4 | 3 |
| (Serbia) 2018 | 2nd place, silver medalist(s) | 7 | 6 | 1 |
| (Italy) 2019 | 1st place, gold medalist(s) | 7 | 7 | 0 |
| (North Macedonia) 2022 | 2nd place, silver medalist(s) | 7 | 5 | 2 |
| (North Macedonia) 2023 | 1st place, gold medalist(s) | 7 | 7 | 0 |
| (Greece) 2024 | 2nd place, silver medalist(s) | 7 | 6 | 1 |
| (Georgia (country)) 2025 | 8th | 7 | 4 | 3 |
| (Romania) 2026 | 3rd place, bronze medalist(s) | 7 | 6 | 1 |
| Total | 38/38 | 290 | 203 | 87 |

== See also ==
- Spanish Basketball Federation
- Spain men's national basketball team
- Spain national youth basketball teams
- Spain women's national under-16 basketball team
