= Italy men's national under-16 and under-17 basketball team =

Italy
- FIBA zone: FIBA Europe
- National federation: Federazione Italiana Pallacanestro
- Coach: Michele Catalani

U17 World Cup
- Appearances: 3
- Medals: Silver: 1 (2024)

U16 EuroBasket
- Appearances: 37
- Medals: Gold: 1 (1991); Silver: 5 (1971, 1979, 1981, 1987, 2023); Bronze: 3 (1985, 1989, 2019)
Home	Away

The Italy men's national under-16 and under-17 basketball team is a national basketball team of Italy, administered by the Italian Basketball Federation. It represents the country in international under-16 and under-17 men's basketball competitions.

The team regularly competes at the FIBA U16 EuroBasket, and also won one silver medal at the FIBA U17 World Cup.

== Competitive record ==
=== FIBA U17 World Cup ===
Year	Position
(Germany) 2010	Did not qualify
(Lithuania) 2012	Did not qualify
(United Arab Emirates) 2014	9th
(Spain) 2016	Did not qualify
(Argentina) 2018	Did not qualify
(Spain) 2022	Did not qualify
(Turkey) 2024	2nd
(Turkey) 2026	13th
(Greece) 2028	TBD
Total	3/9

=== FIBA U16 EuroBasket ===
Year	Position
(Italy) 1971	2nd
(Italy) 1973	4th
(Greece) 1975	4th
(France) 1977	4th
(Syria) 1979	2nd
(Greece) 1981	2nd
(Germany) 1983	5th
(Bulgaria) 1985	3rd
(Hungary) 1987	2nd
(Spain) 1989	3rd
(Greece) 1991	1st
(Turkey) 1993	6th
(Portugal) 1995	5th

Year	Position
(Belgium) 1997	11th
(Slovenia) 1999	CR
(Latvia) 2001	10th
(Spain) 2003	9th
(Greece) 2004	6th
(Spain) 2005	7th
(Spain) 2006	6th
(Greece) 2007	5th
(Italy) 2008	13th
(Lithuania) 2009	12th
(Montenegro) 2010	9th
(Czech Republic) 2011	10th
(Lithuania) 2012	4th

Year	Position
(Ukraine) 2013	4th
(Latvia) 2014	5th
(Lithuania) 2015	10th
(Poland) 2016	7th
(Montenegro) 2017	9th
(Serbia) 2018	12th
(Italy) 2019	3rd
(North Macedonia) 2022	6th
(North Macedonia) 2023	2nd
(Greece) 2024	5th
(Georgia (country)) 2025	4th
(Romania) 2026	12th
Total	37/38

== See also ==
- Italy men's national basketball team
- Italy men's national under-18 and under-19 basketball team
- Italy women's national under-17 basketball team
