= 2001 FIBA Europe Under-16 Championship =

International basketball competition

2001 FIBA U16 European Championship
16th FIBA Under-16 European Basketball Championship

Tournament details
- Host country: Latvia
- Dates: 13–22 July 2001
- Teams: 12 (from 1 federation)
- Venue: (in 1 host city)

Final positions
- Champions: Yugoslavia (3rd title)

Tournament statistics
- MVP: (Federal Republic of Yugoslavia) Veljko Tomović
- Top scorer: (Lithuania) Kleiza (21.5)
- Top rebounds: (Lithuania) Kleiza (12.3)
- Top assists: (Georgia (country)) Markhvashvili (5.4)
- PPG (Team): Spain, Georgia (80.0)
- RPG (Team): Yugoslavia (42.0)
- APG (Team): Georgia (19.1)

Official website
- Official website (archive)

The 2001 FIBA Europe Under-16 Championship (known at that time as 2001 European Championship for Cadets) was the 16th edition of the FIBA Europe Under-16 Championship. The city of Riga, in Latvia, hosted the tournament. Yugoslavia won the trophy for third time in a row.

== Teams ==
- Croatia
- France
- Georgia
- Greece
- Israel
- Italy
- Latvia
- Lithuania
- Russia
- Yugoslavia
- Spain
- Turkey

== Qualification ==
There were two qualifying rounds for this tournament. Twenty-four national teams entered the qualifying round. Fifteen teams advanced to the Challenge Round, where they joined Turkey, Macedonia and France. The remaining eighteen teams were allocated in three groups of six teams each. The three top teams of each group joined Yugoslavia (title holder), Greece (runner-up) and Latvia (host) in the final tournament.

== Preliminary round ==
The twelve teams were allocated in two groups of six teams each.

| Team advanced to Quarterfinals |
| Team competed in 9th–12th playoffs |

=== Group A ===
| Team | Pld | W | L | PF | PA | Pts |
|---|---|---|---|---|---|---|
| Yugoslavia | 5 | 4 | 1 | 391 | 317 | 9 |
| Spain | 5 | 4 | 1 | 415 | 396 | 9 |
| Lithuania | 5 | 4 | 1 | 365 | 339 | 9 |
| Turkey | 5 | 2 | 3 | 353 | 376 | 7 |
| Georgia | 5 | 1 | 4 | 407 | 420 | 6 |
| Italy | 5 | 0 | 5 | 313 | 396 | 5 |

=== Group B ===
| Team | Pld | W | L | PF | PA | Pts |
|---|---|---|---|---|---|---|
| Russia | 5 | 5 | 0 | 361 | 287 | 10 |
| Latvia | 5 | 4 | 1 | 330 | 312 | 9 |
| France | 5 | 3 | 2 | 327 | 307 | 8 |
| Greece | 5 | 2 | 3 | 367 | 340 | 7 |
| Croatia | 5 | 1 | 4 | 337 | 397 | 6 |
| Israel | 5 | 0 | 5 | 346 | 425 | 5 |

== Knockout stage ==
=== 9th–12th playoffs ===
Playoffs
Georgia | 66
Israel | 82
Croatia | 70
Italy | 75

Ninth place
Israel | 80
Italy | 67
Eleventh place
Georgia | 87
Croatia | 85

=== Championship ===
Quarterfinals
Latvia | 50
Lithuania | 55
Yugoslavia | 71
Greece | 68
France | 68
Spain | 86
Russia | 58
Turkey | 53

Semifinals
Lithuania | 70
Yugoslavia | 76
Spain | 61
Russia | 77

Final
Yugoslavia | 55
Russia | 43
Third place
Lithuania | 74
Spain | 75

==== 5th–8th playoffs ====
Playoffs
Latvia | 47
Greece | 61
France | 67
Turkey | 48

Fifth place
Greece | 52
France | 54
Seventh place
Latvia | 56
Turkey | 58

== Final standings ==
| Rank | Team |
|---|---|
| Gold medal | Yugoslavia |
| Silver medal | Russia |
| Bronze medal | Spain |
| 4th | Lithuania |
| 5th | France |
| 6th | Greece |
| 7th | Turkey |
| 8th | Latvia |
| 9th | Israel |
| 10th | Italy |
| 11th | Georgia |
| 12th | Croatia |

2001 European Championship for Cadets

Yugoslavia
Eighth title

Team roster

Stefan Majstorović, Mlađen Šljivančanin, Vukašin Aleksić, Srđan Živković, Dušan Vučićević, Vladimir Micov, Veljko Tomović, Darko Miličić, Vladimir Mašulović, Kosta Perović, Milovan Raković, and Luka Bogdanović. Head coach: Stevan Karadžić.
