= 2003 FIBA Europe Under-16 Championship =

2003 FIBA U16 European Championship
17th FIBA Under-16 European Basketball Championship

Tournament details
- Host country: Spain
- Dates: 18–27 July 2003
- Teams: 12 (from 1 federation)
- Venue: (in 1 host city)

Final positions
- Champions: Serbia and Montenegro (4th title)

Tournament statistics
- MVP: (Serbia and Montenegro) Nemanja Aleksandrov
- Top scorer: (Italy) Luigi Da Tome (21.1)
- Top rebounds: (Spain) José Ángel Antelo (13.8)
- Top assists: (Turkey) Cenk Akyol (3.0)
- PPG (Team): Serbia and Montenegro (89.6)
- RPG (Team): Italy (42.0)
- APG (Team): Serbia and Montenegro (10.4)

Official website
- Official website (archive)

The 2003 FIBA Europe Under-16 Championship (known at that time as 2003 European Championship for Cadets) was the 17th edition of the FIBA Europe Under-16 Championship. The city of Madrid, in Spain, hosted the tournament. Serbia and Montenegro won the trophy for the fourth time in a row.

== Teams ==
- Bulgaria
- France
- Macedonia
- Greece
- Israel
- Italy
- Lithuania
- Russia
- Serbia and Montenegro
- Slovenia
- Spain
- Turkey

== Qualification ==
There were two qualifying rounds for this tournament. Twenty-four national teams entered the qualifying round. Fifteen teams advanced to the Challenge Round, where they joined Lithuania, Greece and France. The remaining eighteen teams were allocated in three groups of six teams each. The three top teams of each group joined Serbia and Montenegro (title holder), Russia (runner-up) and Spain (host) in the final tournament.

== Preliminary round ==
The twelve teams were allocated in two groups of six teams each.

Team advanced to Quarterfinals
Team competed in 9th–12th playoffs

=== Group A ===
Team	Pld	W	L	PF	PA	Pts
Turkey	5	5	0	417	321	10
Russia	5	4	1	398	366	9
France	5	3	2	420	378	8
Macedonia	5	2	3	369	345	7
Lithuania	5	1	4	335	426	6
Bulgaria	5	0	5	315	418	5

=== Group B ===
Team	Pld	W	L	PF	PA	Pts
Serbia and Montenegro	5	5	0	459	329	10
Spain	5	3	2	349	365	8
Slovenia	5	2	3	329	334	7
Greece	5	2	3	315	363	7
Italy	5	2	3	327	334	7
Israel	5	1	4	321	375	6

== Knockout stage ==
=== 9th–12th playoffs ===
Playoffs
Lithuania	63
Israel	68
Bulgaria	88
Italy	97

Ninth place
Israel	52
Italy	69
Eleventh place
Lithuania	101
Bulgaria	54

=== Championship ===
Quarterfinals
France	66
Spain	71
Turkey	79
Greece	71
Slovenia	68
Russia	104
Serbia and Montenegro	86
Macedonia	58

Semifinals
Spain	74
Turkey	76
Russia	63
Serbia and Montenegro	89

Final
Turkey	68
Serbia and Montenegro	83
Third place
Spain	70
Russia	92

==== 5th–8th playoffs ====
Playoffs
France	80
Greece	60
Slovenia	58
Macedonia	55

Fifth place
France	60
Slovenia	54
Seventh place
Greece	59
Macedonia	70

== Final standings ==
Rank	Team
Gold medal	Serbia and Montenegro
Silver medal	Turkey
Bronze medal	Russia
4th	Spain
5th	France
6th	Slovenia
7th	Macedonia
8th	Greece
9th	Italy
10th	Israel
11th	Lithuania
12th	Bulgaria

2003 FIBA Europe Championship for Cadets

Serbia and Montenegro
Ninth title

Team roster

Miloš Teodosić, Milenko Tepić, Stefan Nikolić, Marko Djurković, Dragan Labović, Nenad Mijatović, Dušan Trajković, Nenad Zivčević, Nemanja Aleksandrov, Branko Jereminov, Nikola Dragović, and Boban Medenica. Head coach: Mijo Kadija.
