= 2007 FIBA Europe Under-16 Championship =

2007 EuroBasket Under-16
21st FIBA Europe Under-16 Championship

Tournament details
- Host country: Greece
- Dates: 20–29 July 2007
- Teams: 16
- Venue(s): 3 (in 3 host cities)

Final positions
- Champions: Serbia (1st title)

Tournament statistics
- MVP: (Serbia) Dejan Musli
- Top scorer: (Croatia) Prostran (20.0)
- Top rebounds: (Czech Republic) Satoranský (12.3)
- Top assists: (Czech Republic) Satoranský (4.7)
- PPG (Team): Lithuania (83.1)
- RPG (Team): Serbia (49.5)
- APG (Team): Spain (15.3)

Official website
- Official website (archive)

The 2007 FIBA Europe Under-16 Championship was the 21st edition of the FIBA Europe Under-16 Championship. The cities of Ierapetra, Rethymno and Heraklion, in Greece, hosted the tournament. Serbia won the trophy for the first time since the dissolution of Serbia and Montenegro. Slovenia and Portugal were relegated to Division B.

== Competition system ==
The tournament format changed from previously years. The sixteen teams were allocated in four groups of four teams each. The first three teams in each group qualified for the qualifying round. The last team of each group played for the 13th–16th position in the Classification Games. The twelve teams qualified for the qualifying round were allocated in two groups of six teams each. The results of the games between the teams in the preliminary round were taken into account for the ranking in the qualifying round. The two top teams of each group qualified for the semifinals.

== Teams ==
- Croatia
- Czech Republic
- France
- Georgia
- Greece
- Israel
- Italy
- Latvia
- Lithuania
- Portugal
- Russia
- Serbia
- Slovenia
- Spain
- Turkey
- Ukraine

== Preliminary round ==
| Team advanced to Qualifying Round |
| Team competed in 13th–16th games |

=== Group A ===
| Team | Pld | W | L | PF | PA | Pts |
|---|---|---|---|---|---|---|
| Spain | 3 | 3 | 0 | 237 | 188 | 6 |
| Italy | 3 | 2 | 1 | 213 | 181 | 5 |
| Georgia | 3 | 1 | 2 | 209 | 240 | 4 |
| Slovenia | 3 | 0 | 3 | 193 | 243 | 3 |

=== Group B ===
| Team | Pld | W | L | PF | PA | Pts |
|---|---|---|---|---|---|---|
| Serbia | 3 | 3 | 0 | 196 | 171 | 6 |
| France | 3 | 2 | 1 | 201 | 198 | 5 |
| Israel | 3 | 1 | 2 | 184 | 168 | 4 |
| Czech Republic | 3 | 0 | 3 | 162 | 206 | 3 |

=== Group C ===
| Team | Pld | W | L | PF | PA | Pts |
|---|---|---|---|---|---|---|
| Turkey | 3 | 3 | 0 | 243 | 164 | 6 |
| Lithuania | 3 | 2 | 1 | 290 | 160 | 5 |
| Ukraine | 3 | 1 | 2 | 174 | 249 | 4 |
| Portugal | 3 | 0 | 3 | 129 | 263 | 3 |

=== Group D ===
| Team | Pld | W | L | PF | PA | Pts |
|---|---|---|---|---|---|---|
| Greece | 3 | 3 | 0 | 217 | 165 | 6 |
| Latvia | 3 | 1 | 2 | 196 | 216 | 4 |
| Croatia | 3 | 1 | 2 | 219 | 230 | 4 |
| Russia | 3 | 1 | 2 | 200 | 221 | 4 |

== Classification round ==
| Team relegated to Division B. |

=== Group G ===
| Team | Pld | W | L | PF | PA | Pts |
|---|---|---|---|---|---|---|
| Czech Republic | 3 | 3 | 0 | 194 | 151 | 6 |
| Russia | 3 | 2 | 1 | 188 | 158 | 5 |
| Slovenia | 3 | 1 | 2 | 184 | 182 | 4 |
| Portugal | 3 | 0 | 3 | 144 | 219 | 3 |

== Qualifying round ==
| Team advanced to Semifinals |
| Team competed in 5th–8th playoffs |
| Team competed in 9th–12th playoffs |

=== Group E ===
| Team | Pld | W | L | PF | PA | Pts |
|---|---|---|---|---|---|---|
| Serbia | 5 | 5 | 0 | 384 | 279 | 10 |
| Spain | 5 | 4 | 1 | 338 | 265 | 9 |
| France | 5 | 3 | 2 | 299 | 309 | 8 |
| Italy | 5 | 2 | 3 | 335 | 336 | 7 |
| Georgia | 5 | 1 | 4 | 297 | 418 | 6 |
| Israel | 5 | 0 | 5 | 295 | 341 | 5 |

=== Group F ===
| Team | Pld | W | L | PF | PA | Pts |
|---|---|---|---|---|---|---|
| Turkey | 5 | 5 | 0 | 379 | 315 | 10 |
| Lithuania | 5 | 4 | 1 | 419 | 299 | 9 |
| Greece | 5 | 3 | 2 | 338 | 309 | 8 |
| Croatia | 5 | 2 | 3 | 353 | 382 | 7 |
| Latvia | 5 | 1 | 4 | 321 | 365 | 6 |
| Ukraine | 5 | 0 | 5 | 291 | 431 | 5 |

== Knockout stage ==
=== 9th–12th playoffs ===
Playoffs
Ukraine | 71
Georgia | 40
Israel | 62
Latvia | 71

Ninth place
Ukraine | 57
Latvia | 58
Eleventh place
Georgia | 64
Israel | 77

=== 5th–8th playoffs ===
Playoffs
Italy | 74
Greece | 59
Croatia | 63
France | 66

Fifth place
Italy | 50
France | 41
Seventh place
Greece | 62
Croatia | 55

=== Championship ===
Semifinals
Turkey | 75
Spain | 81
Serbia | 74
Lithuania | 64

Final
Spain | 55
Serbia | 56
Third place
Turkey | 55
Lithuania | 65

== Final standings ==
| Rank | Team |
|---|---|
| 1st place, gold medalist(s) | Serbia |
| 2nd place, silver medalist(s) | Spain |
| 3rd place, bronze medalist(s) | Lithuania |
| 4th | Turkey |
| 5th | Italy |
| 6th | France |
| 7th | Greece |
| 8th | Croatia |
| 9th | Latvia |
| 10th | Ukraine |
| 11th | Israel |
| 12th | Georgia |
| 13th | Czech Republic |
| 14th | Russia |
| 15th | Slovenia |
| 16th | Portugal |

2007 FIBA Europe U-16 Championship

Serbia
Tenth title

Team roster

Nemanja Jaramaz, Aleksandar Ponjavić, Nikša Nikolić, Aleksandar Obradović, Nikola Vukasović, Stevan Lekić, Danilo Anđušić, Lazar Radosavljević, Bogdan Jovanović, Nikola Rondović, Branislav Đekić, and Dejan Musli. Head coach: Dragan Vaščanin.

| Relegated to the 2008 FIBA Europe Under-16 Championship Division B |
