= 2004 FIBA Europe Under-16 Championship =

2004 EuroBasket Under-16
18th FIBA Europe Under-16 Championship

Tournament details
- Host country: Greece
- Dates: 6–15 July 2004
- Teams: 16
- Venue(s): (in 2 host cities)

Final positions
- Champions: France (1st title)

Tournament statistics
- MVP: (Russia) Vitaly Kuznetsov
- Top scorer: (Italy) Gallinari (18.6)
- Top rebounds: (Russia) Pishchalnikov (14.5)
- Top assists: (Croatia) Ugrinoski (7.1)
- PPG (Team): Russia (82.0)
- RPG (Team): Russia (45.4)
- APG (Team): Spain (15.5)

Official website
- Official website (archive)

The 2004 FIBA Europe Under-16 Championship was the 18th edition of the FIBA Europe Under-16 Championship. The cities of Amaliada and Pyrgos, in Greece, hosted the tournament. France won the trophy for the first time. Georgia and Germany were relegated to Division B.

== Teams ==
- Belgium
- Croatia
- France
- Georgia
- Germany
- Greece
- Israel
- Italy
- Latvia
- Lithuania
- Poland
- Russia
- Serbia and Montenegro
- Slovenia
- Spain
- Turkey

== System of competition ==
The tournament format changed with the inclusion of the Division System. The sixteen teams from Division A entered the tournament. In the preliminary round, the sixteen teams were allocated in four groups of four teams each. The two top teams from each group qualify for the quarterfinals. The eight teams were allocated on two groups of four teams each, with the two top teams qualifying for the semifinals. The two teams qualified 15th and 16th were relegated to Division B.

== Preliminary round ==
Team advanced to Quarterfinals
Team competed in 9th–16th games

=== Group A ===
Team	Pld	W	L	PF	PA	Pts
Slovenia	3	3	0	223	200	6
Russia	3	2	1	255	213	5
Israel	3	1	2	235	218	4
Poland	3	0	3	201	283	3

=== Group B ===
Team	Pld	W	L	PF	PA	Pts
Italy	3	3	0	201	166	6
Lithuania	3	2	1	218	196	5
Serbia and Montenegro	3	1	2	213	215	4
Georgia	3	0	3	185	240	3

=== Group C ===
Team	Pld	W	L	PF	PA	Pts
Turkey	3	3	0	224	163	6
France	3	2	1	194	175	5
Croatia	3	1	2	177	196	4
Latvia	3	0	3	178	239	3

=== Group D ===
Team	Pld	W	L	PF	PA	Pts
Spain	3	3	0	245	140	6
Greece	3	2	1	195	197	5
Belgium	3	1	2	179	219	4
Germany	3	0	3	176	239	3

== Classification round ==
Team advanced to 9th–12th playoffs
Team competed in 13th–16th playoffs

=== Group G ===
Team	Pld	W	L	PF	PA	Pts
Croatia	3	3	0	227	183	6
Israel	3	2	1	241	196	5
Georgia	3	1	2	185	225	4
Germany	3	0	3	208	258	3

=== Group H ===
Team	Pld	W	L	PF	PA	Pts
Serbia and Montenegro	3	2	1	247	199	5
Belgium	3	2	1	224	223	5
Poland	3	1	2	219	263	4
Latvia	3	1	2	193	198	4

== Quarterfinals round ==
Team advanced to Semifinals
Team competed in 5th–8th playoffs

=== Group E ===
Team	Pld	W	L	PF	PA	Pts
Turkey	3	3	0	217	181	6
Lithuania	3	2	1	216	210	5
Slovenia	3	1	2	171	198	4
Greece	3	0	3	184	199	3

=== Group F ===
Team	Pld	W	L	PF	PA	Pts
Russia	3	3	0	252	231	6
France	3	1	2	208	203	4
Spain	3	1	2	209	212	4
Italy	3	1	2	205	228	4

== Knockout stage ==
=== 13th–16th playoffs ===
Playoffs
Georgia	79
Latvia	84
Germany	74
Poland	76

Thirteenth place
Latvia	70
Poland	63
Fifteenth place
Georgia	80
Germany	75

Georgia and Germany were relegated to Division B.

=== 9th–12th playoffs ===
Playoffs
Belgium	57
Croatia	79
Israel	60
Serbia and Montenegro	77

Ninth place
Croatia	63
Serbia and Montenegro	80
Eleventh place
Belgium	74
Israel	81

=== 5th–8th playoffs ===
Playoffs
Greece	76
Spain	64
Slovenia	54
Italy	82

Fifth place
Greece	70
Italy	62
Seventh place
Spain	67
Slovenia	55

=== Championship ===
Semifinals
Turkey	61
France	70
Lithuania	73
Russia	89

Final
France	65
Russia	60
Third place
Turkey	75
Lithuania	69

2004 FIBA Europe U-16 Championship

France
First title

== Final standings ==
Rank	Team
Gold medal	France
Silver medal	Russia
Bronze medal	Turkey
4th	Lithuania
5th	Greece
6th	Italy
7th	Spain
8th	Slovenia
9th	Serbia and Montenegro
10th	Croatia
11th	Israel
12th	Belgium
13th	Latvia
14th	Poland
15th	Georgia
16th	Germany

Relegated to the 2005 FIBA Europe Under-16 Championship Division B
