= Turkey men's national under-16 and under-17 basketball team =

Youth basketball team representing Turkey

Turkey
- FIBA zone: FIBA Europe
- National federation: Turkish Basketball Federation
- Coach: Hasan Özmeriç

U17 World Cup
- Appearances: 4
- Medals: Silver: 1 (2016); Bronze: 1 (2024)

U16 EuroBasket
- Appearances: 36
- Medals: Gold: 3 (1977, 2005, 2012); Silver: 1 (2003); Bronze: 7 (1999, 2004, 2008, 2010, 2015, 2016, 2018)
Home	Away

The Turkey men's national under-16 and under-17 basketball team (Turkish: Ümit Milli Basketbol Takımı) is the national representative for Turkey in international under-16 and under-17 men's basketball tournaments. They are formed and run by the Turkish Basketball Federation.

The team regularly competes at the FIBA U16 EuroBasket, and also won two medals at the FIBA U17 World Cup.

== Tournament record ==
=== FIBA U17 World Cup ===
Year	Pos.	Pld	W	L	Ref.
(Germany) 2010	Did not qualify				
(Lithuania) 2012	Did not qualify				
(United Arab Emirates) 2014	Did not qualify				
(Spain) 2016	2nd	7	5	2	
(Argentina) 2018	5th	7	5	2	
(Spain) 2022	Did not qualify				
(Turkey) 2024	3rd	7	5	2	
(Turkey) 2026	4th	7	5	2	
(Greece) 2028	To be determined				
Total	4 / 9	28	20	8	

=== FIBA U16 EuroBasket ===
Year	Pos.	Pld	W	L	Ref.
(Italy) 1971	8th	7	2	5	
(Italy) 1973	8th	9	4	5	
(Greece) 1975	Did not participate				
(France) 1977	1st	7	7	0	
(Syria) 1979	10th	6	2	4	
(Greece) 1981	6th	7	3	4	
(Germany) 1983	9th	7	3	4	
(Bulgaria) 1985	8th	7	3	4	
(Hungary) 1987	10th	7	1	6	
(Spain) 1989	4th	7	3	4	
(Greece) 1991	4th	7	4	3	
(Turkey) 1993	4th	7	5	2	
(Portugal) 1995	7th	7	3	4	
(Belgium) 1997	Challenge Round				
(Slovenia) 1999	3rd	8	3	5	
(Latvia) 2001	7th	8	3	5	
(Spain) 2003	2nd	8	7	1	
(Greece) 2004	3rd	8	7	1	
(Spain) 2005	1st	8	7	1	
(Spain) 2006	8th	8	4	4	
(Greece) 2007	4th	8	6	2	
(Italy) 2008	3rd	8	5	3	
(Lithuania) 2009	8th	8	4	4	
(Montenegro) 2010	3rd	9	5	4	
(Czech Republic) 2011	7th	9	5	4	
(Lithuania) (Latvia) 2012	1st	9	7	2	
(Ukraine) 2013	7th	9	5	4	
(Latvia) 2014	4th	9	6	3	
(Lithuania) 2015	3rd	9	7	2	
(Poland) 2016	3rd	7	5	2	
(Montenegro) 2017	5th	7	4	3	
(Serbia) 2018	3rd	7	5	2	
(Italy) 2019	5th	7	6	1	
(North Macedonia) 2022	8th	7	3	4	
(North Macedonia) 2023	10th	7	2	5	
(Greece) 2024	8th	7	2	5	
(Georgia (country)) 2025	7th	7	5	2	
(Romania) 2026	10th	7	4	3	
Total	36/38	274	157	117	

== See also ==
- Turkey men's national basketball team
- Turkey men's national under-20 basketball team
- Turkey men's national under-18 and under-19 basketball team
- Turkey women's national under-16 and under-17 basketball team
