= Russia men's national under-16 and under-17 basketball team =

Youth basketball team representing Russia

Russia
- FIBA zone: FIBA Europe
- National federation: Russian Basketball Federation

U17 World Cup
- Appearances: None

U16 EuroBasket
- Appearances: 19
- Medals: Silver: 4 (1997, 2001, 2004, 2006); Bronze: 2 (1993, 2003)

U16 EuroBasket Division B
- Appearances: 2
- Medals: Gold: 2 (2016, 2018)

The Russia men's national under-16 and under-17 basketball team is a national basketball team of Russia, administered by the Russian Basketball Federation. It represented the country in men's international under-16 and under-17 basketball competitions.

After the 2022 Russian invasion of Ukraine, FIBA banned Russian teams and officials from participating in FIBA basketball competitions.

== FIBA U16 EuroBasket participations ==
Year	Division A	Division B
1993	3rd place, bronze medalist(s)	
1997	2nd place, silver medalist(s)	
1999	11th	
2001	2nd place, silver medalist(s)	
2003	3rd place, bronze medalist(s)	
2004	2nd place, silver medalist(s)	
2005	6th	
2006	2nd place, silver medalist(s)	
2007	14th	
2008	8th	
2009	5th	

Year	Division A	Division B
2010	7th	
2011	5th	
2012	13th	
2013	11th	
2014	12th	
2015	16th	
2016		1st place, gold medalist(s)
2017	16th	
2018		1st place, gold medalist(s)
2019	4th	

== See also ==
- Russia men's national basketball team
- Russia men's national under-19 basketball team
- Soviet Union men's national under-16 basketball team
- Russia women's national under-17 basketball team
