= 2005 FIBA Europe Under-16 Championship =

2005 EuroBasket Under-16
19th FIBA Europe Under-16 Championship

Tournament details
- Host country: Spain
- Dates: 29 July – 7 August 2005
- Teams: 16
- Venue(s): (in 1 host city)

Final positions
- Champions: Turkey (2nd title)

Tournament statistics
- MVP: (France) Antoine Diot
- Top scorer: (Israel) Sean Daniel (25.3)
- Top rebounds: (Russia) Pavel Gromyko (14.5)
- Top assists: (Greece) Marios Matalon (5.4)
- PPG (Team): Spain (81.5)
- RPG (Team): Lithuania (41.4)
- APG (Team): Greece (10.5)

Official website
- Official website (archive)

The 2005 FIBA Europe Under-16 Championship was the 19th edition of the FIBA Europe Under-16 Championship. The city of León, in Spain, hosted the tournament. Turkey won the trophy for the second time. Poland and Belgium were relegated to Division B.

== Teams ==
- Belgium
- Croatia
- France
- Greece
- Iceland
- Israel
- Italy
- Latvia
- Lithuania
- Poland
- Russia
- Serbia and Montenegro
- Slovenia
- Spain
- Turkey
- Ukraine

== Preliminary round ==
Team advanced to Quarterfinals
Team competed in 9th–16th games

=== Group A ===
Team	Pld	W	L	PF	PA	Pts
Lithuania	3	3	0	246	178	6
Italy	3	2	1	194	188	5
Israel	3	1	2	221	240	4
Poland	3	0	3	170	225	3

=== Group B ===
Team	Pld	W	L	PF	PA	Pts
France	3	3	0	252	236	6
Spain	3	2	1	256	217	5
Latvia	3	1	2	212	244	4
Serbia and Montenegro	3	0	3	210	233	3

=== Group C ===
Team	Pld	W	L	PF	PA	Pts
Russia	3	2	1	211	188	5
Croatia	3	2	1	227	225	5
Greece	3	2	1	223	188	5
Iceland	3	0	3	180	240	3

=== Group D ===
Team	Pld	W	L	PF	PA	Pts
Turkey	3	3	0	236	212	6
Ukraine	3	2	1	217	195	5
Slovenia	3	1	2	196	196	4
Belgium	3	0	3	192	238	3

== Classification round ==
Team advanced to 9th–12th playoffs
Team competed in 13th–16th playoffs

=== Group G ===
Team	Pld	W	L	PF	PA	Pts
Serbia and Montenegro	3	3	0	225	182	6
Israel	3	2	1	220	195	5
Greece	3	1	2	199	179	4
Belgium	3	0	3	128	216	3

=== Group H ===
Team	Pld	W	L	PF	PA	Pts
Slovenia	3	2	1	231	203	5
Latvia	3	2	1	214	190	5
Iceland	3	1	2	167	200	4
Poland	3	1	2	204	223	4

== Quarterfinals round ==
Team advanced to Semifinals
Team competed in 5th–8th playoffs

=== Group E ===
Team	Pld	W	L	PF	PA	Pts
Lithuania	3	3	0	243	184	6
Spain	3	2	1	243	223	5
Russia	3	1	2	213	221	4
Ukraine	3	0	3	153	224	3

=== Group F ===
Team	Pld	W	L	PF	PA	Pts
Turkey	3	2	1	231	226	5
France	3	2	1	243	227	5
Italy	3	1	2	226	251	4
Croatia	3	1	2	249	245	4

== Knockout stage ==
=== 13th–16th playoffs ===
Playoffs
Poland	79
Greece	80
Belgium	56
Iceland	64

Thirteenth place
Greece	103
Iceland	54
Fifteenth place
Poland	62
Belgium	61

Poland and Belgium were relegated to Division B.

=== 9th–12th playoffs ===
Playoffs
Latvia	45
Serbia and Montenegro	77
Slovenia	60
Israel	89

Ninth place
Serbia and Montenegro	75
Israel	76
Eleventh place
Latvia	72
Slovenia	65

=== 5th–8th playoffs ===
Playoffs
Russia	90
Croatia	75
Italy	40
Ukraine	78

Fifth place
Russia	66
Ukraine	73
Seventh place
Croatia	73
Italy	77

=== Championship ===
Semifinals
Lithuania	73
France	76
Spain	83
Turkey	88

Final
France	55
Turkey	61
Third place
Lithuania	63
Spain	70

2005 FIBA Europe U-16 Championship

Turkey
Second title

== Final standings ==
Rank	Team
1st place, gold medalist(s)	Turkey
2nd place, silver medalist(s)	France
3rd place, bronze medalist(s)	Spain
4th	Lithuania
5th	Ukraine
6th	Russia
7th	Italy
8th	Croatia
9th	Israel
10th	Serbia and Montenegro
11th	Latvia
12th	Slovenia
13th	Greece
14th	Iceland
15th	Poland
16th	Belgium

Relegated to the 2006 FIBA Europe Under-16 Championship Division B
