= 2006 FIBA Europe Under-16 Championship =

2006 EuroBasket Under-16
20th FIBA Europe Under-16 Championship

Tournament details
- Host country: Spain
- Dates: 11–20 August 2006
- Teams: 16
- Venue(s): 3 (in 3 host cities)

Final positions
- Champions: Spain (1st title)

Tournament statistics
- MVP: (Spain) Ricky Rubio
- Top scorer: (Spain) Ricky Rubio (23.3)
- Top rebounds: (Spain) Ricky Rubio (12.8)
- Top assists: (Spain) Ricky Rubio (7.1)
- PPG (Team): Spain (92.0)
- RPG (Team): Latvia (49.0)
- APG (Team): Spain (14.3)

Official website
- Official website (archive)

The 2006 FIBA Europe Under-16 Championship was the 20th edition of the FIBA Europe Under-16 Championship. The cities of Linares, Andújar and Martos, in Spain, hosted the tournament. Spain won the trophy for the first time. Germany and Iceland were relegated to Division B.

== Teams ==
- Croatia
- France
- Germany
- Greece
- Iceland
- Israel
- Italy
- Latvia
- Lithuania
- Portugal
- Russia
- Serbia and Montenegro
- Slovenia
- Spain
- Turkey
- Ukraine

== Preliminary round ==
Team advanced to Quarterfinals
Team competed in 9th–16th games

=== Group A ===
Team	Pld	W	L	PF	PA	Pts
Turkey	3	3	0	225	199	6
Italy	3	2	1	230	217	5
Latvia	3	1	2	217	186	4
Portugal	3	0	3	162	232	3

=== Group B ===
Team	Pld	W	L	PF	PA	Pts
Spain	3	3	0	261	212	6
Russia	3	2	1	220	216	5
Germany	3	1	2	213	231	4
Slovenia	3	0	3	200	235	3

=== Group C ===
Team	Pld	W	L	PF	PA	Pts
Croatia	3	2	1	230	234	5
Serbia and Montenegro	3	2	1	244	233	5
Greece	3	1	2	237	242	4
Lithuania	3	1	2	229	231	4

=== Group D ===
Team	Pld	W	L	PF	PA	Pts
France	3	3	0	260	165	6
Israel	3	2	1	198	201	5
Ukraine	3	1	2	190	208	4
Iceland	3	0	3	182	256	3

== Classification round ==
Team advanced to 9th–12th playoffs
Team competed in 13th–16th playoffs

=== Group G ===
Team	Pld	W	L	PF	PA	Pts
Greece	3	3	0	239	187	6
Latvia	3	2	1	229	184	5
Slovenia	3	1	2	209	212	4
Iceland	3	0	3	180	274	3

=== Group H ===
Team	Pld	W	L	PF	PA	Pts
Lithuania	3	3	0	253	204	6
Ukraine	3	2	1	226	207	5
Portugal	3	1	2	226	244	4
Germany	3	0	3	191	241	3

== Quarterfinals round ==
Team advanced to Semifinals
Team competed in 5th–8th playoffs

=== Group E ===
Team	Pld	W	L	PF	PA	Pts
Russia	3	3	0	265	225	6
Croatia	3	2	1	214	197	5
Turkey	3	1	2	225	213	4
Israel	3	0	3	202	271	3

=== Group F ===
Team	Pld	W	L	PF	PA	Pts
Spain	3	3	0	259	214	6
Serbia and Montenegro	3	2	1	255	232	5
Italy	3	1	2	207	222	4
France	3	0	3	196	249	3

== Knockout stage ==
=== 13th–16th playoffs ===
Playoffs
Germany	71
Slovenia	85
Iceland	70
Portugal	84

Thirteenth place
Slovenia	78
Portugal	59
Fifteenth place
Germany	103
Iceland	79

Germany and Iceland were relegated to Division B.

=== 9th–12th playoffs ===
Playoffs
Greece	73
Ukraine	59
Latvia	83
Lithuania	93

Ninth place
Greece	79
Lithuania	76
Eleventh place
Ukraine	59
Latvia	73

=== 5th–8th playoffs ===
Playoffs
France	85
Turkey	67
Israel	54
Italy	69

Fifth place
France	67
Italy	57
Seventh place
Turkey	74
Israel	76

=== Championship ===
Semifinals
Russia	82
Serbia and Montenegro	74
Croatia	82
Spain	106

Final
Russia	106
Spain	110
Third place
Serbia and Montenegro	85
Croatia	69

2006 FIBA Europe U-16 Championship

Spain
First title

== Final standings ==
Rank	Team
1st place, gold medalist(s)	Spain
2nd place, silver medalist(s)	Russia
3rd place, bronze medalist(s)	Serbia and Montenegro
4th	Croatia
5th	France
6th	Italy
7th	Israel
8th	Turkey
9th	Greece
10th	Lithuania
11th	Latvia
12th	Ukraine
13th	Slovenia
14th	Portugal
15th	Germany
16th	Iceland

Relegated to the 2007 FIBA Europe Under-16 Championship Division B
