= 1999 FIBA Europe Under-16 Championship =

1999 FIBA U16 European Championship
15th FIBA Under-16 European Basketball Championship

Tournament details
- Host country: Slovenia
- Dates: 15–24 July 1999
- Teams: 12 (from 1 federation)
- Venue: (in 3 host cities)

Final positions
- Champions: Yugoslavia (2nd title)

Tournament statistics
- MVP: (Federal Republic of Yugoslavia) Aleksandar Gajić
- Top scorer: (Greece) Zisis (23.9)
- Top rebounds: (Croatia) Lončar (15.3)
- Top assists: (North Macedonia) Mirakovski (3.3)
- PPG (Team): Macedonia (83.5)
- RPG (Team): Croatia (35.0)
- APG (Team): Yugoslavia (8.3)

Official website
- Official website (archive)

The 1999 FIBA Europe Under-16 Championship (known at that time as 1999 European Championship for Cadets) was the 15th edition of the FIBA Europe Under-16 Championship. The cities of Polzela, Celje and Laško, in Slovenia, hosted the tournament. Yugoslavia won the trophy for the second time in a row.

== Teams ==
- Croatia
- France
- Georgia
- Greece
- Latvia
- Macedonia
- Poland
- Russia
- Yugoslavia
- Slovenia
- Spain
- Turkey

== Qualification ==
There were two qualifying rounds for this tournament. Twenty-four national teams entered the qualifying round. Fifteen teams advanced to the Challenge Round, where they joined Greece, Israel and France. The remaining eighteen teams were allocated in three groups of six teams each. The three top teams of each group joined Yugoslavia (title holder), Russia (runner-up) and Slovenia (host) in the final tournament.

== Preliminary round ==
The twelve teams were allocated in two groups of six teams each.

Team advanced to Quarterfinals
Team competed in 9th–12th playoffs

=== Group A ===
Team	Pld	W	L	PF	PA	Pts
Macedonia	5	3	2	430	385	8
France	5	3	2	351	321	8
Spain	5	3	2	359	374	8
Latvia	5	2	3	344	338	7
Croatia	5	2	3	346	385	7
Poland	5	2	3	332	359	7

=== Group B ===
Team	Pld	W	L	PF	PA	Pts
Yugoslavia	5	5	0	373	326	10
Greece	5	4	1	375	326	9
Georgia	5	3	2	399	390	8
Turkey	5	1	4	321	354	6
Slovenia	5	1	4	328	347	6
Russia	5	1	4	328	381	6

== Knockout stage ==
=== 9th–12th playoffs ===
Playoffs
Russia	81
Croatia	74
Slovenia	76
Poland	79

Ninth place
Croatia	82
Poland	64
Eleventh place
Russia	82
Slovenia	66

=== Championship ===
Quarterfinals
Spain	73
Greece	78
Turkey	65
Macedonia	64
Georgia	91
France	94
Yugoslavia	77
Latvia	62

Semifinals
Greece	71
Turkey	64
France	49
Yugoslavia	67

Final
Greece	48
Yugoslavia	59
Third place
Turkey	81
France	63

==== 5th–8th playoffs ====
Playoffs
Spain	77
Macedonia	91
Georgia	62
Latvia	72

Fifth place
Macedonia	83
Latvia	90
Seventh place
Spain	75
Georgia	109

== Final standings ==
Rank	Team
Gold medal	Yugoslavia
Silver medal	Greece
Bronze medal	Turkey
4th	France
5th	Latvia
6th	Macedonia
7th	Georgia
8th	Spain
9th	Croatia
10th	Poland
11th	Russia
12th	Slovenia

1999 European Championship for Cadets

Yugoslavia
Seventh title

Team roster

Jovan Stefanov, Bojan Bakić, Aleksandar Gajić, Strahinja Zgonjanin, Nemanja Matović, Miloš Pavlović, Dušan Đorđević, Mirko Kovač, Miloš Nišavić, Srđan Bulatović, Ivan Andonov, and Tomislav Tomović. Head coach: Petar Rodić.
