= 2009 FIBA Europe Under-16 Championship =

2009 FIBA U16 European Championship
23rd FIBA Under-16 European Basketball Championship

Tournament details
- Host country: Lithuania
- Dates: 6–16 August 2009
- Teams: 16 (from 1 federation)
- Venue(s): 3 (in 1 host city)

Final positions
- Champions: Spain (2nd title)

Tournament statistics
- MVP: Tauras Jogėla

Official website
- Official web

The 2009 FIBA Europe Under-16 Championship was the 23rd edition of the FIBA Europe Under-16 Championship. The city of Kaunas, in Lithuania, hosted the tournament. Spain won their second title.

== Teams ==
- Spain
- Lithuania
- Serbia
- Poland
- Russia
- Croatia
- France
- Turkey
- Latvia
- Montenegro
- Germany
- Italy
- Israel
- Greece
- Ukraine
- Czech Republic

== Group stages ==
=== Preliminary round ===
In this round, the sixteen teams were allocated in four groups of four teams each. The top three will qualify for the Qualifying Round. The last team of each group will play for the 13th–16th place in the Classification Games.

Team advances to Qualifying Round
Team will compete in Classification Round

Times given below are in CEST (UTC+2).

==== Group A ====
Team	Pld	W	L	PF	PA	PD	Pts	Tiebreaker
Turkey	3	3	0	236	194	+42	6	
Italy	3	1	2	223	213	+10	4	1–1
Montenegro	3	1	2	210	229	−19	4	1–1
Israel	3	1	2	216	249	−33	4	1–1

August 6
13:30

Report

Israel	81–66	Montenegro
Scoring by quarter: 16–20, 18–21, 19–10, 28–15

Arvydas Sabonis Basketball Centre, Kaunas

August 6
15:45

Report

Turkey	69–59	Italy
Scoring by quarter: 12–18, 16–10, 18–13, 23–18

Arvydas Sabonis Basketball Centre, Kaunas

August 7
13:30

Report

Montenegro	64–74	Turkey
Scoring by quarter: 14–19, 18–21, 21–11, 11–23

Zalgiris Training Centre, Kaunas

August 7
20:15

Report

Italy	90–64	Israel
Scoring by quarter: 26–16, 19–9, 25–19, 20–20

Zalgiris Training Centre, Kaunas

August 8
15:45

Report

Italy	74–80	Montenegro
Scoring by quarter: 16–20, 15–17, 21–23, 22–20

Arvydas Sabonis Basketball Centre, Kaunas

August 8
20:15

Report

Israel	71–93	Turkey
Scoring by quarter: 10–21, 23–28, 22–24, 16–20

Arvydas Sabonis Basketball Centre, Kaunas

==== Group B ====
Team	Pld	W	L	PF	PA	PD	Pts	Tiebreaker
Russia	3	3	0	249	193	+56	6	
Poland	3	2	1	214	226	−12	5	
Lithuania	3	1	2	212	218	−6	4	
Greece	3	0	3	192	230	−38	3	

August 6
18:00

Report

Lithuania	70–80	Russia
Scoring by quarter: 18–13, 24–18, 9–25, 19–24

Arvydas Sabonis Basketball, Kaunas

August 6
21:15

Report

Greece	69–76	Poland
Scoring by quarter: 23–18, 18–21, 17–19, 11–18

Arvydas Sabonis Basketball, Kaunas

August 7
15:45

Report

Russia	76–52	Greece
Scoring by quarter: 20–14, 13–19, 29–7, 14–12

Zalgiris Training Centre, Kaunas

August 7
18:00

Report

Poland	67–64	Lithuania
Scoring by quarter: 20–21, 14–13, 16–11, 17–19

Zalgiris Training Centre, Kaunas

August 8
13:30

Report

Russia	93–71	Poland
Scoring by quarter: 28–18, 22–17, 21–18, 22–18

Arvydas Sabonis Basketball Centre, Kaunas

August 8
18:00

Report

Greece	71–78	Lithuania
Scoring by quarter: 11–22, 15–9, 23–23, 22–24

Arvydas Sabonis Basketball Centre, Kaunas

==== Group C ====
Team	Pld	W	L	PF	PA	PD	Pts	Tiebreaker
Spain	3	3	0	223	164	+59	6	
Croatia	3	2	1	211	174	+37	5	
Germany	3	1	2	155	220	−65	4	
Czech Republic	3	0	3	192	233	−41	3	

August 6
13:30

Report

Czech Republic	64–75	Germany
Scoring by quarter: 19–17, 10–27, 22–13, 13–18

Zalgiris Training Centre, Kaunas

August 6
15:15

Report

Spain	66–64	Croatia
Scoring by quarter: 18–9, 18–15, 8–13, 9–7

Zalgiris Training Centre, Kaunas

August 7
13:30

Report

Germany	40–79	Spain
Scoring by quarter: 19–25, 11–18, 10–17, 0–19

Arvydas Sabonis Basketball Centre, Kaunas

August 7
20:15

Report

Croatia	70–68	Czech Republic
Scoring by quarter: 19–25, 18–11, 16–16, 17–16

Arvydas Sabonis Basketball Centre, Kaunas

August 8
14:15

Report

Czech Republic	60–88	Spain
Scoring by quarter: 16–17, 12–26, 17–28, 15–17

Zalgiris Training Centre, Kaunas

August 8
20:15

Report

Croatia	77–40	Germany
Scoring by quarter: 21–7, 19–9, 14–15, 23–9

Zalgiris Training Centre, Kaunas

==== Group D ====
Team	Pld	W	L	PF	PA	PD	Pts	Tiebreaker
France	3	3	0	258	190	+68	6	
Latvia	3	2	1	241	225	+17	5	
Serbia	3	1	2	231	233	−2	4	
Ukraine	3	0	3	161	243	−82	3	

August 6
17:30

Report

Latvia	80–60	Ukraine
Scoring by quarter: 18–15, 14–21, 28–18, 20–6

Zalgiris Training Centre, Kaunas

August 6
21:30

Report

Serbia	74–87	France
Scoring by quarter: 19–24, 14–17, 21–19, 20–27

Zalgiris Training Centre, Kaunas

August 7
15:45

Report

France	90–76	Latvia
Scoring by quarter: 24–24, 23–14, 23–18, 20–20

Arvydas Sabonis Basketball Centre, Kaunas

August 7
18:00

Report

Ukraine	61–82	Serbia
Scoring by quarter: 15–18, 23–15, 13–26, 10–23

Arvydas Sabonis Basketball Centre, Kaunas

August 8
13:30

Report

France	81–40	Ukraine
Scoring by quarter: 27–8, 19–11, 18–13, 17–8

Zalgiris Training Centre, Kaunas

August 8
15:45

Report

Latvia	85–75	Serbia
Scoring by quarter: 27–28, 22–11, 10–12, 26–24

Zalgiris Training Centre, Kaunas

=== Qualifying round ===
The twelve teams remaining will be allocated in two groups of six teams each. The four top teams will advance to the quarterfinals. The last two teams of each group will play for the 9th–12th place.

Team advances to Quarterfinals
Team will compete in 9th–12th playoffs

==== Group E ====
Team	Pld	W	L	PF	PA	PD	Pts	Tiebreaker
Russia	5	4	1	423	339	+84	9	
Poland	5	3	2	339	346	−7	8	1–0
Turkey	5	3	2	329	326	+3	8	0–1
Lithuania	5	2	3	344	330	+14	7	1–0
Montenegro	5	2	3	340	387	−47	7	0–1
Italy	5	1	4	321	368	−47	6	

August 10
15:45

Report

Poland	59–53	Italy
Scoring by quarter: 19–6, 9–13, 16–13, 15–21

Arvydas Sabonis Basketball Centre, Kaunas

August 10
18:00

Report

Lithuania	66–47	Turkey
Scoring by quarter: 15–11, 25–15, 14–11, 12–10

Arvydas Sabonis Basketball Centre, Kaunas

August 10
20:15

Report

Montenegro	56–92	Russia
Scoring by quarter: 20–27, 7–16, 19–20, 10–29

Arvydas Sabonis Basketball Centre, Kaunas

August 11
15:45

Report

Turkey	61–70	Poland
Scoring by quarter: 19–12, 9–9, 8–24, 25–25

Zalgiris Training Centre, Kaunas

August 11
18:00

Report

Lithuania	75–65	Montenegro
Scoring by quarter: 19–10, 22–13, 16–17, 18–25

Zalgiris Training Centre, Kaunas

August 11
20:15

Report

Italy	64–91	Russia
Scoring by quarter: 13–19, 16–28, 19–31, 16–13

Zalgiris Training Centre, Kaunas

August 12
15:45

Report

Poland	72–75	Montenegro
Scoring by quarter: 14–23, 21–8, 18–27, 19–17

Arvydas Sabonis Basketball Centre, Kaunas

August 12
18:00

Report

Italy	71–69	Lithuania
Scoring by quarter: 16–23, 9–16, 19–13, 27–17

Arvydas Sabonis Basketball Centre, Kaunas

August 12
20:15

Report

Russia	67–78	Turkey
Scoring by quarter: 19–16, 23–21, 12–22, 13–19

Arvydas Sabonis Basketball Centre, Kaunas

==== Group F ====
Team	Pld	W	L	PF	PA	PD	Pts	Tiebreaker
France	5	5	0	371	315	+56	10	
Spain	5	3	2	359	347	+12	8	
Croatia	5	2	3	350	307	+43	7	1–1
Serbia	5	2	3	408	395	+13	7	1–1
Latvia	5	2	3	365	376	−11	7	1–1
Germany	5	1	4	256	369	−113	6	

August 10
15:45

Report

Latvia	56–84	Croatia
Scoring by quarter: 11–25, 21–15, 8–22, 16–22

Zalgiris Training Centre, Kaunas

August 10
18:00

Report

Serbia	90–92	Spain
Scoring by quarter: 22–26, 21–28, 24–15, 23–23

Zalgiris Training Centre, Kaunas

August 10
20:15

Report

Germany	42–56	France
Scoring by quarter: 12–15, 19–7, 6–20, 5–14

Zalgiris Training Centre, Kaunas

August 11
15:45

Report

Serbia	94–65	Germany
Scoring by quarter: 24–14, 30–20, 20–17, 20–14

Arvydas Sabonis Basketball Centre, Kaunas

August 11
18:00

Report

Spain	58–85	Latvia
Scoring by quarter: 13–30, 7–15, 21–26, 17–14

Arvydas Sabonis Basketball Centre, Kaunas

August 11
20:15

Report

Croatia	59–70	France
Scoring by quarter: 14–10, 17–29, 14–19, 14–12

Arvydas Sabonis Basketball Centre, Kaunas

August 12
15:45

Latvia	63–69	Germany
Scoring by quarter: 8–12, 17–13, 19–16, 19–28

Zalgiris Training Centre, Kaunas

August 12
18:00

Report

Croatia	66–75	Serbia
Scoring by quarter: 18–21, 20–19, 19–15, 9–20

Zalgiris Training Centre, Kaunas

August 12
20:15

Report

France	68–64	Spain
Scoring by quarter: 15–12, 23–20, 9–15, 21–17

Zalgiris Training Centre, Kaunas

=== Classification round ===
The last teams of each group in the preliminary round will compete in this Classification Round. The four teams will play in one group. The last two teams will be relegated to Division B for the next season.

Team will be relegated to Division B.

==== Group G ====
Team	Pld	W	L	PF	PA	PD	Pts	Tiebreaker
Israel	3	3	0	249	207	+42	6	
Greece	3	2	1	240	198	+42	5	
Ukraine	3	1	2	215	218	−3	4	
Czech Republic	3	0	3	157	238	−81	3	

August 10
13:30

Report

Israel	82–74	Ukraine
Scoring by quarter: 21–20, 25–15, 19–19, 17–20

Arvydas Sabonis Basketball Centre, Kaunas

August 10
13:30

Report

Greece	82–46	Czech Republic
Scoring by quarter: 23–10, 26–13, 11–10, 22–13

Zalgiris Training Centre, Kaunas

August 12
13:30

Report

Czech Republic	57–82	Israel
Scoring by quarter: 12–19, 22–21, 9–22, 14–20

Arvydas Sabonis Basketball Centre, Kaunas

August 12
13:30

Report

Ukraine	67–82	Greece
Scoring by quarter: 18–27, 17–14, 14–23, 18–18

Zalgiris Training Centre, Kaunas

August 14
13:30

Report

Israel	85–76	Greece
Scoring by quarter: 17–17, 20–16, 16–9, 32–34

Arvydas Sabonis Basketball Centre, Kaunas

August 14
15:45

Report

Czech Republic	54–74	Ukraine
Scoring by quarter: 14–17, 15–19, 13–21, 12–17

Arvydas Sabonis Basketball Centre, Kaunas

== Knockout stages ==
=== Championship ===
Quarter-finals
August 14 – Kaunas
Russia	90
Serbia	95
August 14 – Kaunas
Spain	57
Turkey	41
August 14 – Kaunas
Poland	51
Croatia	46
August 14 – Kaunas
France	60
Lithuania	68

Semi-finals
August 15 – Kaunas
Serbia	75
Spain	88
August 15 – Kaunas
Poland	63
Lithuania	70

Final
August 16 – Kaunas
Spain	70
Lithuania	64
Third place
August 16 – Kaunas
Serbia	75
Poland	69

==== Quarterfinals ====
August 14
13:30

Report

Russia	90–95	Serbia
Scoring by quarter: 18–21, 24–18, 15–16, 9–14

Kaunas Sports Hall, Kaunas

August 14
15:45

Report

Poland	51–46	Croatia
Scoring by quarter: 18–13, 11–6, 7–14, 15–13

Kaunas Sports Hall, Kaunas

August 14
18:00

Report

France	60–68	Lithuania
Scoring by quarter: 13–15, 21–13, 8–21, 18–19

Kaunas Sports Hall, Kaunas

August 14
20:15

Report

Spain	57–41	Turkey
Scoring by quarter: 14–13, 8–10, 21–11, 14–7

Kaunas Sports Hall, Kaunas

==== Semifinals ====
August 15
18:00

Report

Lithuania	70–63	Poland
Scoring by quarter: 15–18, 22–17, 18–16, 15–12

Kaunas Sports Hall, Kaunas

August 15
20:15

Report

Serbia	75–88	Spain
Scoring by quarter: 16–15, 21–24, 22–20, 16–29

Kaunas Sports Hall, Kaunas

==== Bronze-medal game ====
August 16
18:00

Report

Serbia	75–69	Poland
Scoring by quarter: 22–7, 18–18, 14–19, 21–25

Kaunas Sports Hall, Kaunas

==== Final ====
August 16
20:15

Report

Spain	70–64	Lithuania
Scoring by quarter: 21–12, 13–14, 17–22, 19–16

Kaunas Sports Hall, Kaunas
Attendance: 5 000
Referees: Georgios Tanatzis (GRE), Marco Giansanti (ITA), Oscar Lefwerth (SWE)

=== 5th–8th playoffs ===
Semi-finals
August 15 – Kaunas
France	49
Croatia	79
August 15 – Kaunas
Russia	77
Turkey	61

Fifth place
August 16 – Kaunas
Croatia	79
Russia	83
Seventh place
August 16 – Kaunas
France	79
Turkey	66

==== 5th–8th semifinals ====
August 15
13:30

Report

France	49–79	Croatia
Scoring by quarter: 9–17, 11–24, 14–19, 15–19

Kaunas Sports Hall, Kaunas

August 15
15:45

Report

Russia	77–61	Turkey
Scoring by quarter: 18–15, 17–19, 16–20, 26–7

Kaunas Sports Hall, Kaunas

==== 7th place playoff ====
August 16
13:30

Turkey	66–79	France
Scoring by quarter: 12–25, 18–21, 22–20, 14–13

Kaunas Sports Hall, Kaunas

==== 5th place playoff ====
August 16
15:45

Report

Russia	83–79	Croatia
Scoring by quarter: 18–12, 27–20, 19–20, 19–27

Kaunas Sports Hall, Kaunas

=== 9th–12th playoffs ===
Semi-finals
August 14 – Kaunas
Montenegro	54
Germany	48
August 14 – Kaunas
Latvia	73
Italy	72

Ninth place
August 16 – Kaunas
Montenegro	69
Latvia	76
Eleventh place
August 16 – Kaunas
Germany	55
Italy	53

==== 9th–12th semifinals ====
August 14
18:00

Report

Montenegro	54–48	Germany
Scoring by quarter: 15–9, 14–12, 17–13, 8–14

Arvydas Sabonis Basketball Centre, Kaunas

August 14
20:15

Report

Latvia	73–72	Italy
Scoring by quarter: 16–21, 14–12, 22–22, 21–17

Arvydas Sabonis Basketball Centre, Kaunas

==== 11th place playoff ====
August 16
13:30

Report

Germany	55–53	Italy
Scoring by quarter: 20–12, 12–16, 10–6, 13–19

Arvydas Sabonis Basketball Centre, Kaunas

==== 9th place playoff ====
August 16
15:45

Report

Montenegro	69–76	Latvia
Scoring by quarter: 22–16, 10–21, 12–17, 25–22

Arvydas Sabonis Basketball Centre, Kaunas

== Final standings ==
Rank	Team	Record
1st place, gold medalist(s)	Spain	7–2
2nd place, silver medalist(s)	Lithuania	5–4
3rd place, bronze medalist(s)	Serbia	5–4
4th	Poland	5–4
5th	Russia	7–2
6th	Croatia	4–5
7th	France	7–2
8th	Turkey	4–5
9th	Latvia	5–3
10th	Montenegro	3–5
11th	Germany	3–5
12th	Italy	1–7
13th	Israel	4–2
14th	Greece	2–4
15th	Ukraine	1–5
16th	Czech Republic	0–6

Qualified for the 2010 FIBA Under-17 World Championship
Qualified as the host nation for the 2010 FIBA Under-17 World Championship
Relegated to the 2010 FIBA Europe Under-16 Championship Division B
