= 2016 FIBA U16 European Championship =

30th FIBA Under-16 European Basketball Championship

Tournament details
- Host country: Poland
- Dates: 12–20 August 2016
- Teams: 16
- Venue: (in 1 host city)

Final positions
- Champions: Spain (5th title)

Tournament statistics
- MVP: (Spain) Usman Garuba
- Top scorer: (Serbia) Pecarski (26.6)
- Top rebounds: (Serbia) Pecarski (15.9)
- Top assists: (Spain) Alocen (6.4)
- PPG (Team): Lithuania (83.4)
- RPG (Team): Croatia (49.7)
- APG (Team): Spain (21.4)

Official website
- www.fiba.basketball

The 2016 FIBA U16 European Championship was the 30th edition of the European Under-16 Basketball Championship. Sixteen teams participated in the competition, held in Radom, Poland, from 12 to 20 August 2016. Bosnia and Herzegovina, the defending champions, were relegated to the 2017 Division B.

== Participating teams ==
- Bosnia and Herzegovina
- Croatia
- Estonia ▲ (Winners, 2015 FIBA Europe Under-16 Championship Division B)
- Finland
- France
- Germany
- Greece
- Italy
- Latvia
- Lithuania
- Montenegro
- Poland ▲ (Runners-up, 2015 FIBA Europe Under-16 Championship Division B)
- Serbia
- Spain
- Sweden ▲ (3rd place, 2015 FIBA Europe Under-16 Championship Division B)
- Turkey

== First round ==
In this round, sixteen teams are allocated in four groups of four teams each. All teams advance to the Playoffs.

=== Group A ===
Pos	Team	Pld	W	L	PF	PA	PD	Pts
1	Spain	3	3	0	241	184	+57	6
2	Italy	3	1	2	223	199	+24	4
3	Latvia	3	1	2	216	230	−14	4
4	Sweden	3	1	2	168	235	−67	4

Source: FIBA

12 August 2016

Italy	71–79	Latvia

12 August 2016

Spain	80–50	Sweden

13 August 2016

Sweden	50–89	Italy

13 August 2016

Latvia	71–91	Spain

15 August 2016

Italy	63–70	Spain

15 August 2016

Sweden	68–66	Latvia

=== Group B ===
Pos	Team	Pld	W	L	PF	PA	PD	Pts
1	Croatia	3	2	1	174	148	+26	5
2	Turkey	3	2	1	197	173	+24	5
3	Germany	3	2	1	187	177	+10	5
4	Poland	3	0	3	155	215	−60	3

Source: FIBA

12 August 2016

Report

Turkey	73–49	Poland
Scoring by quarter: 14–14, 25–11, 17–6, 17–18
Pts: Akyuz 19; Rebs: Konuk 7 Asts: Akyuz 8		Pts: Pluta 10; Rebs: Drozdowski 10; Asts: Rajewicz 3

12 August 2016

Report

Germany	41–54	Croatia
Scoring by quarter: 7–16, 9–9, 13–10, 12–19
Pts: Drescher 15; Rebs: Drescher 7 Asts: Kopple 2		Pts: Šamanić 16; Rebs: Planinić 8 Asts: Macner 4

13 August 2016

Report

Croatia	53–59	Turkey
Scoring by quarter: 11–9, 11–15, 13–16, 18–19
Pts: Šamanić; Rebs: Planinić; Asts: Macner		Pts: Akyuz; Rebs: Demir; Asts: Atbas

13 August 2016

Report

Poland	58–75	Germany
Scoring by quarter: 14–23, 22–18, 12–16, 10–18
Pts: Pluta 17; Rebs: Drozdowski 10; Asts: Rajewicz 4		Pts: Mattisseck 15; Rebs: Drescher 11; Asts: Mattisseck 3

15 August 2016

Report

Germany	71–65	Turkey
Scoring by quarter: 22–14, 13–9, 18–17, 18–25
Pts: Mattisseck 12; Rebs: Drescher 10; Asts: Drescher 3		Pts: Guletkin 15; Rebs: Akyuz 4 Asts: Akyuz 5

15 August 2016

Report

Poland	48–67	Croatia
Scoring by quarter: 11–24, 15–19, 9–11, 13–13
Pts: Janczak 17; Rebs: Drozdowski 8 Asts: Strzepek 2		Pts: Janković 19; Rebs: Šamanić 14; Asts: Macner 7

=== Group C ===
Pos	Team	Pld	W	L	PF	PA	PD	Pts
1	Lithuania	3	3	0	267	182	+85	6
2	Montenegro	3	2	1	195	210	−15	5
3	France	3	1	2	175	180	−5	4
4	Bosnia and Herzegovina	3	0	3	150	215	−65	3

Source: FIBA

12 August 2016

Lithuania	96–46	Bosnia and Herzegovina

12 August 2016

France	56–59	Montenegro

13 August 2016

Bosnia and Herzegovina	46–55	France

13 August 2016

Montenegro	72–96	Lithuania

15 August 2016

Montenegro	64–58	Bosnia and Herzegovina

15 August 2016

Lithuania	75–64	France

=== Group D ===
Pos	Team	Pld	W	L	PF	PA	PD	Pts
1	Finland	3	3	0	223	189	+34	6
2	Greece	3	2	1	186	172	+14	5
3	Serbia	3	1	2	193	191	+2	4
4	Estonia	3	0	3	166	216	−50	3

Source: FIBA

12 August 2016

Greece	67–74	Finland

12 August 2016

Serbia	77–62	Estonia

13 August 2016

Estonia	43–60	Greece

13 August 2016

Finland	70–61	Serbia

15 August 2016

Greece	59–55	Serbia

15 August 2016

Estonia	61–79	Finland

== Knockout stage ==
=== Bracket ===
Round of 16
Aug 16
Spain	96
Poland	67
Aug 16
Montenegro	75
Serbia	60
Aug 16
Turkey	74
Latvia	66
Aug 16
Finland	55
Bosnia and Herzegovina	38
Aug 16
Italy	86
Germany	57
Aug 16
Lithuania	94
Estonia	74
Aug 16
Croatia	74
Sweden	67
Aug 16
Greece	43
France	59

Quarter-finals
Aug 18
Spain	75
Montenegro	55
Aug 18
Turkey	80
Finland	78
Aug 18
Italy	67
Lithuania	84
Aug 18
Croatia	69
France	52

Semi-finals
Aug 19
Spain	75
Turkey	70
Aug 19
Lithuania	67
Croatia	59

Final
Aug 20
Spain	74
Lithuania	72
Third place
Aug 20
Turkey	77
Croatia	70

=== 5th–8th place bracket ===
5th–8th place semifinals
Aug 19
Montenegro	73
Finland	85
Aug 19
Italy	68
France	77

5th place game
Aug 20
Finland	79
France	71
7th place game
Aug 20
Montenegro	75
Italy	81

=== 9th–16th place bracket ===
13th place game (20 Aug)
Bosnia and Herzegovina	59
Estonia	85
15th place game (20 Aug)
Poland	85
Greece	74

13th–16th place semifinals (19 Aug)
Poland	71
Bosnia and Herzegovina	75
Estonia	65
Greece	59

9th–16th place quarterfinals (18 Aug)
Poland	73
Serbia	82
Latvia	87
Bosnia and Herzegovina	64
Germany	66
Estonia	59
Sweden	59
Greece	57

9th–12th place semifinals (19 Aug)
Serbia	82
Latvia	81
Germany	71
Sweden	64

9th place game (20 Aug)
Serbia	63
Germany	65
11th place game (20 Aug)
Latvia	65
Sweden	51

== Final standings ==
Rank	Team	Record
1st place, gold medalist(s)	Spain	7–0
2nd place, silver medalist(s)	Lithuania	6–1
3rd place, bronze medalist(s)	Turkey	5–2
4th	Croatia	4–3
5th	Finland	6–1
6th	France	3–4
7th	Italy	3–4
8th	Montenegro	3–4
9th	Germany	5–2
10th	Serbia	3–4
11th	Latvia	3–4
12th	Sweden	2–5
13th	Estonia	2–5
14th	Bosnia and Herzegovina	1–6
15th	Poland	1–6
16th	Greece	2–5

Team relegated to the 2017 FIBA U16 European Championship Division B

== Awards ==
Most Valuable Player
(Spain) Usman Garuba

All-Tournament Team

- (Serbia) Marko Pecarski
- (Turkey) Eray Akyuz
- (Lithuania) Dovydas Giedraitis
- (Croatia) Luka Šamanić
- (Spain) Usman Garuba
