= Ibrahim Krehić =

Personal information
- Born: August 10, 1945 (age 81) Sarajevo, Kingdom of Yugoslavia

Career information
- Coaching career: 1971–2005

Career history

Coaching
- 1971–1975: KK Željezničar Sarajevo (assistant)
- 1975–1985: KK Bosna Sarajevo (assistant)
- 1988–1989: KK Bosna Sarajevo
- 1973–1978: Yugoslavia U18 (assistant)
- 1974–1980: Yugoslavia U19 (assistant)
- 1979–1985: Yugoslavia U16 (assistant)
- 1993: Bosnia and Herzegovina (assistant)
- 1995–2005: Youth basketball programs in Bosnia and Herzegovina
Medals
Men's basketball
Representing Yugoslavia
FIBA Europe Under-16 Championship
Gold medal – first place	1979	assistant coach
Gold medal – first place	1983	assistant coach
Gold medal – first place	1985	assistant coach

Ibrahim Krehić is a Bosnian and Yugoslav former professional basketball coach and one of the most decorated and influential figures in the history of Bosnian and Yugoslav basketball. He is best known for his various successful tenures as head coach and assistant coach on numerous KK Bosna Royal teams throughout the 1970s and 1980s, and for his role in coaching the Bosnia and Herzegovina national basketball team at their inaugural EuroBasket in 1993. Krehić's teams won numerous domestic and international titles, and he has been recognised for his lifelong contribution to the sport.

== Coaching career ==
=== KK Bosna Sarajevo ===
Krehić is widely regarded as one of the most successful coaches in the history of KK Bosna, one of the most prominent clubs in former Yugoslavia and Bosnia and Herzegovina. During his time with the club, he was instrumental in the team winning multiple titles, including three Yugoslav League championships and two Yugoslav Cups. He was also part of the coaching staff when Bosna won the EuroLeague in 1979, then known as the FIBA European Champions Cup.

=== National team ===
Throughout the 1980s, Krehić was part of coaching staffs on various Yugoslav youth national teams, winning three gold medals. During the Bosnian War, Krehić served as assistant coach of the Bosnia and Herzegovina national basketball team alongside Mirza Delibašić at 1993 EuroBasket in Germany. Under challenging circumstances, with training taking place in wartime Sarajevo, the team achieved an historic eighth‑place finish, the best result in the nation's history at that time.

=== Later contributions and coaching ===
Even later in his career, Krehić remained active in basketball, working with younger players and sharing his experience. He personally trained several notable Bosnian players including Jusuf Nurkić and working with younger players and sharing his experience.

== Honours ==
- KK Bosna:
  - Yugoslav First Federal League champion with KK Bosna: 1977–78, 1979–80, 1982–83 (assistant coach)
  - Yugoslav Cup winner with KK Bosna: 1977–78, 1987–88 (assistant coach)
  - EuroLeague winner with KK Bosna Sarajevo: 1978–79 (assistant coach)
- Yugoslavia national team:
  - 1979 FIBA Europe Under-16 Championship: Gold (assistant coach)
  - 1983 FIBA Europe Under-16 Championship: Gold (assistant coach)
  - 1985 FIBA Europe Under-16 Championship: Gold (assistant coach)
- Recipient of a lifetime achievement award for contributions to Bosnian basketball
