= Yugoslavia men's national under-18 basketball team =

Men's under-18 basketball team

SFR Yugoslavia
- FIBA zone: FIBA Europe
- National federation: Basketball Federation of Yugoslavia

U18 EuroBasket
- Appearances: 14
- Medals: Gold: 5 (1972, 1974, 1976, 1986, 1988); Silver: 4 (1966, 1968, 1980, 1982); Bronze: 2 (1978, 1984)

Yugoslavia men's national under-18 basketball team
Medal record

Men's basketball

Representing Yugoslavia

European Championship for Juniors
Gold medal – first place	1972 Zadar	
Gold medal – first place	1974 Orléans	
Gold medal – first place	1976 Santiago	
Gold medal – first place	1986 Vöcklabruck, Gmunden	
Gold medal – first place	1988 Titov Vrbas, Srbobran	
Silver medal – second place	1966 Porto San Giorgio	
Silver medal – second place	1968 Vigo	
Silver medal – second place	1980 Celje	
Silver medal – second place	1982 Dimitrovgrad, Haskovo	
Bronze medal – third place	1978 Rosetto, Teramo	
Bronze medal – third place	1984 Huskvarna, Katrineholm	

The Yugoslavia men's national under-18 basketball team (Serbo-Croatian: Juniorska košarkaška reprezentacija Jugoslavije) was the boys' basketball team, administered by Basketball Federation of Yugoslavia, that represented SFR Yugoslavia in international under-18 men's basketball competitions, consisted mainly of the European Championship for Juniors, nowadays known as the FIBA U18 EuroBasket.

After the dissolution of SFR Yugoslavia in 1991, the successor countries all set up their own national under-18 teams. Serbia and Croatia teams won the Championship for three times each, as of 2017.

Several team members have been inducted into the FIBA Hall of Fame, including players Krešimir Ćosić, Mirza Delibašić, Zoran Slavnić, Dragan Kićanović, Vlade Divac, Jure Zdovc, Toni Kukoč, Dražen Petrović, and coaches Ranko Žeravica, Bogdan Tanjević, Mirko Novosel, Dušan Ivković, and Svetislav Pešić. Also, Dino Rađa, Divac, Petrović, Kukoč, and Novosel are members of the Naismith Memorial Basketball Hall of Fame.

Bogdan Tanjević is the only individual who respresented the team both as a player (1964) and a head coach (1974).

== Individual awards ==
Top Scorer

- Vinko Jelovac — 1968

== Competitive record ==
Year	Pos.	GP	W	L	Ref.
(Italy) 1964	7th	5	2	3	
(Italy) 1966	Silver medal	5	4	1	
(Spain) 1968	Silver medal	7	6	1	
(Greece) 1970	4th	7	4	3	
(Socialist Federal Republic of Yugoslavia) 1972	Gold medal	7	7	0	
(France) 1974	Gold medal	9	9	0	
(Spain) 1976	Gold medal	8	7	1	
(Italy) 1978	Bronze medal	7	6	1	
(Socialist Federal Republic of Yugoslavia) 1980	Silver medal	7	6	1	
(Bulgaria) 1982	Silver medal	7	6	1	
(Sweden) 1984	Bronze medal	7	5	2	
(Austria) 1986	Gold medal	7	7	0	
(Socialist Federal Republic of Yugoslavia) 1988	Gold medal	7	7	0	
(Netherlands) 1990	5th	7	4	3	
Total	14/14	97	82	17	

== Coaches ==
Years	Head coach	Assistant coach(es)
1964–1966	Ranko Žeravica	
1968	Slobodan Ivković	
1970	Lazar Lečić	
1972	Mirko Novosel	
1974	Bogdan Tanjević	Slobodan Ivković
1976–1980	Luka Stančić	Dušan Ivković
1982	Rusmir Halilović	Dejan Srzić
1984	Luka Stančić	Dejan Srzić
1986	Svetislav Pešić	Dejan Srzić
1988–1990	Duško Vujošević	Dejan Srzić

== Rosters ==
1964 Championship	1966 Championship	1968 Championship	1970 Championship	1972 Championship	1974 Championship	1976 Championship
4 Tihomir Pavlović; 5 Anton Bračun; 6 Miljenko Valčić; 7 Jurica Kosta; 8 Slobodan Jelić; 9 Danko Hočevar; 10 Momčilo Pazman; 11 Bogdan Tanjević; 12 Srđan Škulić; 13 Ljubiša Stanković; 14 Ljubiša Janjić; 15 Andrej Brenk	4 Mihajlo Manović; 5 Bogdan Tanjević; 6 Sterija Andonovski; 7 Kosta Grubor; 8 Dragiša Vučinić; 9 Ivica Valek; 10 Dragan Kapičić; 11 Ljubodrag Simonović; 12 Damir Šolman; 13 Aljoša Žorga; 14 Željko Dokman; 15 Krešimir Ćosić	4 Žarko Zečević; 5 Dragan Đukić; 6 Ivan Sarjanović; 7 Vinko Jelovac; 8 Dragiša Vučinić; 9 Zoran Slavnić; 10 Mihajlo Manović; 11 Ljubodrag Simonović; 12 Damir Šolman; 13 Stanislav Bizjak; 14 Franjo Luković; 15 Sadik Zejnilović	4 Blagoja Georgievski; 5 Nedjeljko Ostarčević; 6 Radivoj Živković; 7 Anton Sagadin; 8 Branko Kovačević; 9 Branislav Tomić; 10 Goran Rakočević; 11 Davor Rukavina; 12 Miroljub Damjanović; 13 Srećko Jarić; 14 Dragan Radosavljević; 15 Marko Gvardijančić	4 Dragan Todorić; 5 Franc Volaj; 6 Milan Grabovac; 7 Dragan Kićanović; 8 Rajko Žižić; 9 Milan Milićević; 10 Boris Beravs; 11 Ratko Kaljević; 12 Mirza Delibašić; 13 Čedomir Perinčić; 14 Branko Macura; 15 Željko Jerkov	4 Branko Skroče; 5 Goran Kriznar; 6 Boško Bosiočić; 7 Rajko Žižić; 8 Dušan Zupančić; 9 Aleksandar Paternost; 10 Mladen Mohorović; 11 Mihovil Nakić; 12 Andro Knego; 13 Darko Fabulić; 14 Zoran Gavrilović; 15 Ratko Radovanović	4 Mile Stanković; 5 Aleksandar Petrović; 6 Pero Vučica; 7 Predrag Bogosavljev; 8 Damir Pavličević; 9 Stevo Vukasović; 10 Branko Sikirić; 11 Željko Pribanović; 12 Mladen Ostojić; 13 Čedo Brborić; 14 Miodrag Marić; 15 Rade Vukosavljević

1978 Championship	1980 Championship	1982 Championship	1984 Championship	1986 Championship	1988 Championship	1990 Championship
4 Mihailo Poček; 5 Slobodan Nikolić; 6 Petar Popović; 7 Predrag Bogosavljev; 8 Milan Medić; 9 Ivan Sunara; 10 Aleš Pipan; 11 Predrag Benaček; 12 Veljko Petranović; 13 Davor Dogan; 14 Nihat Izić; 15 Dragan Zrno	4 Srđan Dabić; 5 Nebojša Zorkić; 6 Marko Ivanović; 7 Matej Janžek; 8 Milan Medić; 9 Zoran Čutura; 10 Miroljub Mitrović; 11 Žarko Đurišić; 12 Tomislav Tiringer; 13 Goran Grbović; 14 Branko Vukićević; 15 Nikola Lazić	4 Velimir Perasović; 5 Dražen Petrović; 6 Ivica Žurić; 7 Ivo Petović; 8 Zoran Jovanović; 9 Dragan Lukenda; 10 Nebojša Bukumirović; 11 Stojko Vranković; 12 Danko Cvjetićanin; 13 Aleksandar Milivojša; 14 Antonio Ozmec; 15 Goran Sobin	4 Aleksander Govc; 5 Velimir Perasović; 6 Ivica Žurić; 7 Jure Zdovc; 8 Zoran Jovanović; 9 Ivo Nakić; 10 Miroslav Pecarski; 11 Franjo Arapović; 12 Ivica Mavrenski; 13 Mirko Milićević; 14 Žarko Paspalj; 15 Luka Pavićević	4 Ivica Gulin; 5 Luka Pavićević; 6 Nebojša Ilić; 7 Toni Kukoč; 8 Miroslav Pecarski; 9 Teoman Alibegović; 10 Aleksandar Đorđević; 11 Samir Avdić; 12 Vlade Divac; 13 Radenko Dobraš; 14 Dino Rađa; 15 Slaviša Koprivica	4 Živko Badžim; 5 Predrag Danilović; 6 Slobodan Kaličanin; 7 Žan Tabak; 8 Oliver Popović; 9 Nenad Grmuša; 10 Rastko Cvetković; 11 Marijan Kraljević; 12 Dževad Alihodžić; 13 Arijan Komazec; 14 Mirko Pavlović; 15 Ivan Kapov	4 Velibor Radović; 5 Nikola Lončar; 6 Alojz Šiško; 7 Veljko Mršić; 8 Miljan Goljović; 9 Teo Čizmić; 10 Dejan Bodiroga; 11 Željko Rebrača; 12 Miladin Mutavdžić; 13 Mlađan Šilobad; 14 Mirko Pavlović; 15 Roman Horvat

== New national teams ==
After the dissolution of SFR Yugoslavia in 1991, five new countries were created: Bosnia and Herzegovina, Croatia, FYR Macedonia, FR Yugoslavia (in 2003, renamed to Serbia and Montenegro) and Slovenia. In 2006, Montenegro became an independent nation and Serbia became the legal successor of Serbia and Montenegro. In 2008, Kosovo declared independence from Serbia and became a FIBA member in 2015.

Here is a list of men's national under-18 teams on the SFR Yugoslavia area:

- Bosnia and Herzegovina (1992–present)
- Croatia (1992–present)
- North Macedonia (1993–present)
- Serbia and Montenegro (1992–2006)
  - Montenegro (2006–present)
  - Serbia (2006–present)
    - Kosovo (2015–present)
- Slovenia (1992–present)

== See also ==
- Yugoslavia men's national under-19 basketball team
- Yugoslavia men's national under-16 basketball team
