= 250 Steps =

2017 Serbian documentary film

- Film poster
- Serbian: 250 степеника
- Directed by: Vladimir Pajić; Vladimir Kurćubić
- Written by: Vladimir Pajić
- Produced by: Radovan Maksimović
- Cinematography: Pavle Ilić
- Edited by: Vladimir Kurćubić
- Music by: Mladen Pecović
- Production company: PGM Network
- Release date: 25 September 2017 (Serbia)
- Running time: 58 minutes
- Country: Serbia
- Languages: Serbian; Croatian

250 Steps (Serbian Cyrillic: 250 степеника) is a 2017 Serbian documentary film which details how the Yugoslavia men's national under-19 basketball team won the 1987 FIBA Under-19 World Championship in Bormio, Italy. Created by Vladimir Pajić, the film was released on 25 September 2017 in Belgrade, Serbia.

== Cast ==
- Svetislav Pešić, a head coach
- Zoran Kalpić, a roster member
- Luka Pavićević, a roster member
- Nebojša Ilić, a roster member
- Toni Kukoč, a roster member
- Miroslav Pecarski, a roster member
- Teoman Alibegović, a roster member
- Aleksandar Đorđević, a roster member and the team captain
- Samir Avdić, a roster member
- Vlade Divac, a roster member
- Radenko Dobraš, a roster member
- Dino Rađa, a roster member
- Slaviša Koprivica, a roster member
- Marko Pešić, son of Svetislav Pešić. He was 11 at that time.
- Milivoje Karalejić, strength and conditioning coach
- Ljubiša Dmitrović

== Release ==
On 30 October 2019, the film was released on its YouTube channel.
