= Yugoslavia men's national under-16 basketball team =

Men's under-16 basketball team

SFR Yugoslavia
- FIBA zone: FIBA Europe
- National federation: Basketball Federation of Yugoslavia

U16 EuroBasket
- Appearances: 11
- Medals: Gold: 5 (1971, 1979, 1983, 1985, 1987); Silver: 2 (1977, 1989); Bronze: 2 (1973, 1975)

Yugoslavia men's national under-16 basketball team
Medal record

Men's basketball

Representing Yugoslavia

European Championship for Cadets
Gold medal – first place	1971 Gorizia	
Gold medal – first place	1979 Damascus	
Gold medal – first place	1983 Tübingen, Ludwigsburg	
Gold medal – first place	1985 Ruse	
Gold medal – first place	1987 Székesfehérvár, Kaposvár	
Silver medal – second place	1977 Le Touquet, Berck	
Silver medal – second place	1989 Spain	
Bronze medal – third place	1973 Angri, Summonte	
Bronze medal – third place	1975 Athens, Thessaloniki	

The Yugoslavia men's national under-16 basketball team (Serbo-Croatian: Kadetska košarkaška reprezentacija Jugoslavije) was the boys' basketball team, administered by Basketball Federation of Yugoslavia, that represented SFR Yugoslavia in international under-16 (under age 16) men's basketball competitions, consisted mainly of the European Championship for Cadets, nowadays known as the FIBA Europe Under-16 Championship.

After the dissolution of SFR Yugoslavia in 1991, the successor countries all set up their own national under-16 teams. Bosnia and Herzegovina, Serbia and Croatia teams won the Championship, as of 2022.

Several members of the team have been inducted into the FIBA Hall of Fame, including players Mirza Delibašić, Vlade Divac, Jure Zdovc, Dragan Kićanović, Toni Kukoč, Dražen Petrović, and coaches Mirko Novosel and Svetislav Pešić. Also, Divac, Petrović, Kukoč, and Novosel are members of the Naismith Memorial Basketball Hall of Fame.

== Individual awards ==
Top Scorer

- Dražen Petrović — 1981
- Arijan Komazec – 1987

== Competitive record ==
Year	Pos.	GP	W	L	Ref.
(Italy) 1971	Gold medal	7	6	1	
(Italy) 1973	Bronze medal	9	6	3	
(Greece) 1975	Bronze medal	6	5	1	
(France) 1977	Silver medal	7	5	2	
(Syria) 1979	Gold medal	7	7	0	
(Greece) 1981	5th	7	4	3	
(West Germany) 1983	Gold medal	7	6	1	
(Bulgaria) 1985	Gold medal	7	6	1	
(Hungary) 1987	Gold medal	7	7	0	
(Spain) 1989	Silver medal	7	5	2	
(Greece) 1991	8th	7	3	4	
Total	11/11	78	60	18	

== Coaches ==
Years	Head coach	Assistant coach(es)
1971	(Socialist Federal Republic of Yugoslavia) Mirko Novosel	
1973	(Socialist Federal Republic of Yugoslavia) Joša Gagel	
1975	(Socialist Federal Republic of Yugoslavia) Janez Drvarič	
1977–1979	(Socialist Federal Republic of Yugoslavia) Luka Stančić	
1981–1983	(Socialist Federal Republic of Yugoslavia) Rusmir Halilović	
1985	(Socialist Federal Republic of Yugoslavia) Svetislav Pešić	
1987–1989	(Socialist Federal Republic of Yugoslavia) Janez Drvarič	
1991	(Socialist Federal Republic of Yugoslavia) Rajko Toroman	

== Rosters ==
1971 Championship	1973 Championship	1975 Championship	1977 Championship	1979 Championship	1981 Championship
4 Dragan Todorić; 5 Predrag Tripković; 6 Ante Zaloker; 7 Dragan Kićanović; 8 Marko Martinović; 9 Milan Milićević; 10 Zoran Biorac; 11 Rajko Žižić; 12 Mirza Delibašić; 13 Željko Morelj; 14 Radmilo Lukovac; 15 Mirko Grgin	4 Dušan Božić; 5 Goran Kriznar; 6 Boško Bosiočić; 7 Dušan Zupančić; 8 None; 9 Budimir Ćosović; 10 Andro Knego; 11 Mladen Mohorović; 12 Ratko Radovanović; 13 Dragan Pribanović; 14 Dragan Vulić; 15 Đorđe Bosnić	4 Mladen Ostojić; 5 Žarko Koprivica; 6 Milenko Babić; 7 Peter Vilfan; 8 Boran Pilindavinć; 9 Stane Košnik; 10 Slobodan Pećirko; 11 Željko Pribanović; 12 Aleksandar Petrović; 13 Nebojša Nikolić; 14 Branko Sikirić; 15 Rade Vukosavljević	4 Stane Premrl; 5 Draško Vučetić; 6 Darko Petronijević; 7 Sabahudin Bilalović; 8 Žarko Đurišić; 9 Mitja Muha; 10 Bogdan Blaznik; 11 Davor Dogan; 12 Mihailo Poček; 13 Goran Mastilović; 14 Milenko Savović; 15 Milenko Manojlović	4 Srđan Dabić; 5 Nebojša Zorkić; 6 Marko Ivanović; 7 Matej Janžek; 8 Milan Benčić; 9 Zoran Čutura; 10 Dragan Zovko; 11 Tomislav Tiringer; 12 Jurica Kos; 13 Robert Medved; 14 Željko Mrnjavac; 15 Jurid Kebe	4 Neven Cambij; 5 Dražen Petrović; 6 Aleksandar Aleksić; 7 Ivo Petović; 8 Stojko Vranković; 9 Siniša Radonjić; 10 Zoran Sretenović; 11 Velimir Perasović; 12 Saša Radunović; 13 Vladimir Mićunović; 14 Edin Pašić; 15 Aleksandar Milivojša

1983 Championship	1985 Championship	1987 Championship	1989 Championship	1991 Championship
4 Zoran Livljanić; 5 Branislav Prelević; 6 Zoran Jevtić; 7 Jure Zdovc; 8 Miroslav Pecarski; 9 Ivo Nakić; 10 Samir Mujanović; 11 Igor Lukačić; 12 Ivica Mavrenski; 13 Žarko Paspalj; 14 Denis Perić; 15 Luka Pavićević	4 Emilio Kovačić; 5 Nenad Trunić; 6 Zoran Kalpić; 7 Toni Kukoč; 8 Slaviša Koprivica; 9 Nebojša Ilić; 10 Nebojša Razić; 11 Rade Milutinović; 12 Vlade Divac; 13 Dževad Alihodžić; 14 Nenad Videka; 15 Radenko Dobraš	4 Živko Badžim; 5 Oliver Popović; 6 Rastko Cvetković; 7 Žan Tabak; 8 Ante Perica; 9 Nenad Grmuša; 10 Boris Orcev; 11 Marijan Kraljević; 12 Obrad Ignjatović; 13 Arijan Komazec; 14 Mirko Pavlović; 15 Bojan Popović	4 Vladimir Novosel; 5 Nikola Lončar; 6 Mirko Joksimović; 7 Aleksandar Surla; 8 Aleksandar Avlijaš; 9 Velibor Radović; 10 Miro Jurić; 11 Željko Topalović; 12 Miladin Mutavdžić; 13 Petar Arsić; 14 Bojan Tadić; 15 Predrag Prlinčević	4 Igor Perović; 5 Aleksandar Bjelić; 6 Haris Brkić; 7 Saša Dončić; 8 Đerđ Palfi; 9 Branko Sinđelić; 10 Zlatko Bolić; 11 Predrag Drobnjak; 12 Aleksandar Lazić; 13 Miljan Vuksanović; 14 Dejan Mišković; 15 Dušan Jelić

== New national teams ==
After the dissolution of SFR Yugoslavia in 1991, five new countries were created: Bosnia and Herzegovina, Croatia, FYR Macedonia, FR Yugoslavia (in 2003, renamed to Serbia and Montenegro) and Slovenia. In 2006, Montenegro became an independent nation and Serbia became the legal successor of Serbia and Montenegro. In 2008, Kosovo declared independence from Serbia and became a FIBA member in 2015.

Here is a list of men's national under-16 teams on the SFR Yugoslavia area:

- Bosnia and Herzegovina (1992–present)
- Croatia (1992–present)
- North Macedonia (1993–present)
- Serbia and Montenegro (1992–2006)
  - Montenegro (2006–present)
  - Serbia (2006–present)
    - Kosovo (2015–present)
- Slovenia (1992–present)

== See also ==
- Yugoslavia men's national under-19 basketball team
- Yugoslavia men's national under-18 basketball team
