= Yugoslavia men's national under-19 basketball team =

Men's under-19 basketball team

SFR Yugoslavia
- FIBA zone: FIBA Europe
- National federation: Basketball Federation of Yugoslavia

U19 World Cup
- Appearances: 4
- Medals: Gold: 1 (1987)

Yugoslavia men's national under-19 basketball team
Medal record

Men's basketball

Representing Yugoslavia

FIBA Under-19 World Championship
Gold medal – first place	1987 Bormio	

The Yugoslavia men's national under-19 basketball team, commonly referred to as the Yugoslavia men's national junior basketball team (Serbo-Croatian: Mlada košarkaška reprezentacija Jugoslavije), was the boys' basketball team, administered by Basketball Federation of Yugoslavia, that represented SFR Yugoslavia in international under-19 men's basketball competitions, consisting mainly of the World Championship for Junior Men.

The team qualified for all four World Cups between 1979 and 1991.

After the dissolution of SFR Yugoslavia in 1991, the successor countries all set up their own national under-19 teams. Serbia won the Championship in 2007.

Several members of the team have been inducted into the FIBA Hall of Fame, including players Vlade Divac, Jure Zdovc and Toni Kukoč and coach Svetislav Pešić, while players Divac, Kukoč, and Dino Rađa are members of the Naismith Memorial Basketball Hall of Fame.

In 2017, 250 Steps, a film about the 1987 gold medal, was released.

== Individual awards ==
Most Valuable Player

- Toni Kukoč — 1987
- Dejan Bodiroga – 1991

== U19 World Championship record ==
Year	Pos.	GP	W	L	Ref.
(Brazil) 1979	4th	8	5	3	
(Czech Republic) 1983	8th	9	3	6	
(Italy) 1987	1st place, gold medalist(s)	7	7	0	
(Canada) 1991	4th	8	3	5	
Total	4/4	32	18	14	

== Coaches ==
Years	Head coach	Assistant coach(es)
1979	Luka Stančić	
1983	Rusmir Halilović	
1987	Svetislav Pešić	Dejan Srzić
1991	Duško Vujošević	Dejan Srzić, Kosta Jankov

== Players ==
1979 Championship	1983 Championship	1987 Championship	1991 Championship
4 Emir Mutapčić; 5 Zoran Radović; 6 Darko Petronijević; 7 Davor Dogan; 8 Milan Medić; 9 Zoran Čutura; 10 Željko Obradović; 11 Žarko Đurišić; 12 Đordano Baković; 13 Goran Grbović; 14 Milenko Savović; 15 Sabahudin Bilalović	4 Saša Radunović; 5 Velimir Perasović; 6 Franjo Arapović; 7 Jure Zdovc; 8 Zoran Jovanović; 9 Dragan Lukenda; 10 Nebojša Bukumirović; 11 Goran Sobin; 12 Danko Cvjetićanin; 13 Ivica Mavrenski; 14 Ivo Petović; 15 Aleksandar Milivojša	4 Zoran Kalpić; 5 Luka Pavićević; 6 Nebojša Ilić; 7 Toni Kukoč; 8 Miroslav Pecarski; 9 Teoman Alibegović; 10 Aleksandar Đorđević; 11 Samir Avdić; 12 Vlade Divac; 13 Radenko Dobraš; 14 Dino Rađa; 15 Slaviša Koprivica	4 Dejan Bodiroga; 5 Petar Arsić; 6 Nikola Lončar; 7 Veljko Mršić; 8 Gavrilo Pajović; 9 Teo Čizmić; 10 Željko Topalović; 11 Željko Rebrača; 12 Velibor Radović; 13 Mlađan Šilobad; 14 Dragan Tarlać; 15 Zvonimir Ridl

== New national teams ==
After the dissolution of SFR Yugoslavia in 1991, five new countries were created: Bosnia and Herzegovina, Croatia, Macedonia (in 2019, renamed to North Macedonia), FR Yugoslavia (in 2003, renamed to Serbia and Montenegro) and Slovenia. In 2006, Montenegro became an independent nation and Serbia became the legal successor of Serbia and Montenegro. In 2008, Kosovo declared independence from Serbia and became a FIBA member in 2015.

Here is a list of men's national under-19 teams on the SFR Yugoslavia area:

Country	FIBA affiliation	FIBA disaffiliation	Team
Bosnia and Herzegovina	1992	-	They have not played in any U19 tournament yet
Croatia	1992	-	U19 team
Kosovo	2015	-	They have not played in any U19 tournament yet
Montenegro	2006	-	They have not played in any U19 tournament yet
North Macedonia	1993	-	They have not played in any U19 tournament yet
Serbia	2006	-	U19 team
Serbia and Montenegro	1992	2006	They never played in any U19 tournament
Slovenia	1992	-	U19 team

== See also ==
- Yugoslavia men's national basketball team
- Yugoslavia men's national under-18 basketball team
- Yugoslavia men's national under-16 basketball team
- Yugoslavia women's national under-19 basketball team
