= 1985 FIBA Europe Under-16 Championship =

1985 EuroBasket Under-16
8th FIBA Europe Under-16 Championship

Tournament details
- Host country: Bulgaria
- Dates: 18–26 August 1985
- Teams: 12
- Venue(s): (in 1 host city)

Final positions
- Champions: Yugoslavia (4th title)

The 1985 FIBA Europe Under-16 Championship (known at that time as 1985 European Championship for Cadets) was the 8th edition of the FIBA Europe Under-16 Championship. The city of Ruse, in Bulgaria, hosted the tournament. Yugoslavia won the trophy for the fourth time and became the most winning country in the tournament. It was its second title in a row and third in the last four tournaments.

== Teams ==
- Belgium
- Bulgaria
- West Germany
- Finland
- France
- Israel
- Italy
- Soviet Union
- Spain
- Sweden
- Turkey
- Yugoslavia

== Preliminary round ==
The twelve teams were allocated in two groups of six teams each.

| Team advanced to Semifinals |
| Team competed in 5th–8th playoffs |
| Team competed in 9th–12th playoffs |

=== Group A ===
| Team | Pld | W | L | PF | PA | Pts |
|---|---|---|---|---|---|---|
| Yugoslavia | 5 | 4 | 1 | 505 | 354 | 9 |
| West Germany | 5 | 3 | 2 | 357 | 373 | 8 |
| Turkey | 5 | 3 | 2 | 342 | 354 | 8 |
| Soviet Union | 5 | 3 | 2 | 438 | 389 | 8 |
| Sweden | 5 | 1 | 4 | 344 | 403 | 6 |
| Belgium | 5 | 1 | 4 | 306 | 419 | 6 |

=== Group B ===
| Team | Pld | W | L | PF | PA | Pts |
|---|---|---|---|---|---|---|
| Spain | 5 | 4 | 1 | 392 | 376 | 9 |
| Italy | 5 | 4 | 1 | 429 | 390 | 9 |
| Israel | 5 | 2 | 3 | 311 | 351 | 7 |
| Bulgaria | 5 | 2 | 3 | 380 | 391 | 7 |
| France | 5 | 2 | 3 | 387 | 381 | 7 |
| Finland | 5 | 1 | 4 | 344 | 354 | 6 |

== Knockout stage ==
=== 9th–12th playoffs ===
Playoffs
Sweden | 60
Finland | 75
France | 56
Belgium | 62

Ninth place
Finland | 62
Belgium | 64
Eleventh place
Sweden | 64
France | 63

=== 5th–8th playoffs ===
Playoffs
Bulgaria | 86
Turkey | 65
Soviet Union | 80
Israel | 78

Fifth place
Bulgaria | 78
Soviet Union | 90
Seventh place
Turkey | 61
Israel | 72

=== Championship ===
Semifinals
Yugoslavia | 111
Italy | 90
Spain | 88
West Germany | 81

Final
Yugoslavia | 99
Spain | 86
Third place
Italy | 85
West Germany | 81

== Final standings ==
| Rank | Team |
|---|---|
| Gold medal | Yugoslavia |
| Silver medal | Spain |
| Bronze medal | Italy |
| 4th | West Germany |
| 5th | Soviet Union |
| 6th | Bulgaria |
| 7th | Israel |
| 8th | Turkey |
| 9th | Belgium |
| 10th | Finland |
| 11th | Sweden |
| 12th | France |

1985 European Championship for Cadets

Yugoslavia
Fourth title

Team roster

Emilio Kovačić, Nenad Trunić, Zoran Kalpić, Toni Kukoč, Slaviša Koprivica, Nebojša Ilić, Nebojša Razić, Rade Milutinović, Vlade Divac, Dževad Alihodžić, Nenad Videka, and Radenko Dobraš. Head coach: Svetislav Pešić.
