= Miroslav Pecarski =

Serbian basketball player (born 1967)

Personal information
- Born: 21 March 1967 (age 59) Kikinda, SR Serbia, SFR Yugoslavia
- Listed height: 2.11 m (6 ft 11 in)
- Listed weight: 116 kg (256 lb)

Career information
- College: Marist (1984–1987; 1988–1989)
- NBA draft: 1989: undrafted
- Playing career: 1989–2000
- Position: Power forward
- Number: 11, 14

Career history
- 1987–1988: Partizan
- 1989–1991: Partizan
- 1991–1994: Aris
- 1994–1996: Panathinaikos
- 1996–1997: Panionios
- 1997–1998: Polti Cantù
- 1999: Cholet
- 1999–2000: Gijón

Career highlights
- EuroLeague champion (1996); FIBA Saporta Cup champion (1993); FIBA Korać Cup champion (1989); Yugoslav Cup winner (1989); 2× Greek Cup winner (1992, 1996); 2× Second team All-ECAC Metro (1987, 1989); ECAC Metro Rookie of the Year (1985)
Medals
Men's basketball
Representing Yugoslavia
U19 World Cup
Gold medal – first place	1987 Italy	Under-19
European Championship for Juniors
Gold medal – first place	1986 Austria	Under-18
Bronze medal – third place	1984 Sweden	Under-18
European Championship for Cadets
Gold medal – first place	1983 West Germany	under-16

Miroslav Pecarski (Serbian Cyrillic: Мирослав Пецарски; born 21 March 1967) is a Serbian former professional basketball player. He played professionally for Partizan, Aris, Panathinaikos, Panionios, Pallacanestro Cantù, Cholet and Cabitel Gijón.

== Early career and college in the U.S. ==
Following a growth spurt at age thirteen, teenage Pecarski began pursuing basketball in his hometown Kikinda.

Marking himself out with height and strong build, the teenager received a call-up to the Rusmir Halilović-coached Yugoslav cadet team during summer 1983.

=== Marist College ===
Teenage Pecarski left his home to go play college basketball at Marist College in Poughkeepsie, New York, arriving there in summer 1984 under the newly appointed head coach Matt Furjanic. Considered by some to be Europe's top seventeen-year-old player—having just played a significant role on the bronze-winning Yugoslav junior national team at the European Junior Championship in Sweden and starring on the gold-winning Yugoslav cadet team at the European Cadet Championship in West Germany the year before—Pecarski was injured in the preseason thus opening up an opportunity at center for another newly acquired European prospect, eighteen-year-old Dutchman Rik Smits.

The Red Foxes had a successful 1985–86 season, making the 64-team NCAA tournament for the first time in team's history. However, they went out at the very first hurdle in the first round of the Southeast regional bracket, losing by 15 points versus the Georgia Tech team featuring future NBA players Mark Price, John Salley, Tom Hammonds, Duane Ferrell, and Craig Neal. Pecarski averaged 10.5 points per game and 5.9 rebounds per game over the entire season.

During summer 1986, Pecarski played on the Svetislav Pešić-coached Yugoslav junior national team at the European Junior Championship in Austria.

The following season, playing under new head coach Dave Magarity, Pecarski improved his scoring average to 12.4 points per game and led the team in rebounds with 8.4 boards per game, as the Red Foxes repeated the feat of making the NCAA tournament, but were again eliminated in the first round—this time by Pittsburgh.

=== Season with KK Partizan ===
Following making the Svetislav Pešić-coached gold medal-winning Yugoslavia under-19 team at the FIBA Under-19 World Championship during summer 1987 in Bormio, Pecarski opted not to play for the Red Foxes in the 1987–88 season, choosing to explore his options in Europe by going back to Yugoslavia and signing a stipend-based contract with reigning Yugoslav League champions KK Partizan in hopes of giving himself a better shot at making the Yugoslavia roster for the 1988 Olympics. Pecarski's other considerations for transferring to Partizan included the fact that the club's vice-president, Yugoslav basketball legend Dragan Kićanović, personally recruited and pursued the youngster.

Coached by Duško Vujošević, twenty-year-old Pecarski was mostly deployed at center as backup for nineteen-year-old Vlade Divac while the previous season's backup center Milenko Savović went away to serve his mandatory Yugoslav People's Army (JNA) service. The two young bigs, Divac and Pecarski, had already known each other well, having just spent most of the summer 1987 together with the Yugoslavia under-19 team. Other Partizan teammates that the newcomer Pecarski had already known well from his previous Yugoslavia youth national team participations were twenty-year-old Saša Đorđević and twenty-one-year-olds Žarko Paspalj and Ivo Nakić. Pecarski immediately became a crowd favourite for his spectacular behind-the-back dunks.

The squad featured future European and NBA players—including Žarko Paspalj, Aleksandar Đorđević, and Vlade Divac—alongside experienced players Goran Grbović and Željko Obradović. The team was competing in the Yugoslav League, Yugoslav Cup, and European Champions Cup.

On 6 February 1988, Pecarski was one of the main protagonists of the ill-tempered Yugoslav Cup semifinal contest against Jugoplastika at Rijeka's Dvorana Mladosti. Partizan was up 40-29 in the 18th minute, largely behind Pecarski's play at both ends of the floor. Jugoplastika then went on a 30-6 run over the following 10 minutes, winning 73-75 in the end. Numerous scuffles occurred towards the end of the contest—involving Jugoplastika's Toni Kukoč and Partizan's Nakić getting ejecting in the 29th minute as well as, later on, Partizan's head coach Vujošević, small forward Grbović, and even club vice-president Kićanović receiving technicals after being incensed by the decisions of the two referees Zdravko Kurilić (from Tuzla) and Izstok Rems (from Ljubljana)—as the proceedings nearly degenerated into an all out brawl.

Two months later, Partizan made the European Champions Cup Final Four in Ghent, Belgium, losing to Maccabi Tel Aviv in a closely contested semifinal with Pecarski contributing 8 points. Two days later in the third-place game, Partizan beat the Greek champion Aris with Pecarski scoring 24 points.

Domestically in the Yugoslav league, Partizan finished the regular season in third place, behind Jugoplastika and Dražen Petrović-led Cibona. In the playoffs, Partizan overcame the lack of home-court advantage in its semifinal series against Cibona, winning the deciding game 3 away in Zagreb 77-83. However, the up-and-coming Boža Maljković-coached Jugoplastika team, featuring exceptional prospects Toni Kukoč and Dino Rađa, proved too much in the final series, beating Partizan 2-games-to-1 including the deciding game 3 blowout, 88-67, in Split.

=== Return to Marist ===
In summer 1988, Pacerski got called up for the Yugoslavia national team as part of its 1988 Olympic cycle. After participating in the successful qualifying tournament in the Netherlands in July 1988 that saw Yugoslavia clinch a spot at the Seoul Olympics, Pecarski ended up getting cut from the national team by head coach Dušan Ivković who decided to take Cibona center Franjo Arapović to the Olympics as the fourth big on the squad, behind Divac, Rađa, and Stojko Vranković.

Pecarski decided to return to Marist for the 1988–89 season, averaging 19.5 points per game, 9.1 rebounds per game and 1.1 blocks per game, leading the school in all three categories.

==== Return to KK Partizan for the 1989 Yugoslav league finals ====
After completing the 1988-89 season with Marist—in anticipation of the NBA draft where he had been set to be picked according to most projections (including Sports Illustrated's)—Pecarski came back to KK Partizan, re-joining them in April 1989 ahead of the Yugoslav League playoffs final series versus Jugoplastika. Returning to the club whose roster more-or-less stayed intact compared to the squad he had left the previous summer; the only difference being Goran Grbović replaced with young Predrag Danilović at small forward. A re-match of the previous season's Yugoslav League playoff finals, Partizan (having a home court advantage this time) ended up getting swept 0-3 in the best-of-five series after losing game one at home 73-74 then leaving the court before the end of game two in Split with Jugopplastika up 75-70. Game three was administratively awarded to Jugoplastika by the Yugoslav Basketball Federation (KSJ) as punishment for Partizan walking off the court in game two.

== Professional career ==
=== KK Partizan ===
After not getting drafted and also seeing his subsequent attempts at joining the Indiana Pacers as an undrafted player not come to fruition, Pecarski stayed with Partizan for the following 1989-90 season. With head coach Vujošević gone (replaced by Reba Ćorković), along with main squad players gone as well—either transferred out (Divac and Paspalj to the NBA, Đorđević and Obradović away serving their mandatory Yugoslav People's Army (JNA) stints) or unavailable through injury (Danilović broke his leg 11 games into the season)—Partizan had an exceptionally subpar season, at one point fighting for mere league survival.

As a member of Partizan, Pecarski played at the 1988 FIBA European Champions Cup Final Four (1988 EuroLeague Final Four) in Ghent. He also won the FIBA Korać Cup in 1989, and the Yugoslav Cup in 1989.

Pecarski obtained a Greek passport in order to obtain playing eligibility as a native in Greece. He won the Greek Cup in 1992, and the FIBA European Cup (FIBA Saporta Cup) in 1993, with Sato Aris. With Panathinaikos, Pecarski won the FIBA European League (EuroLeague) and the Greek Cup in 1996. He also played at the 1995 FIBA European League Final Four (1995 EuroLeague Final Four), in Zaragoza.

== Personal life ==
In addition to his native Serbia, Pecarski also holds Greek citizenship — obtained for practical reasons of playing without EU administrative restrictions while in the country between 1991 and 1997. All throughout his Greek stint, Pecarski competed under the name Miroslav Mylonas (Greek: Μίροσλαβ Μυλωνάς).

His son Marko (born 2000) is also a basketball player.

Pecarski and Slaviša Koprivica played together on the Yugoslavia national under-19 basketball team, winning gold at the 1987 FIBA Under-19 World Championship. Thirty years later, their sons Marko Pecarski and Balša Koprivica, respectively, played together on the Serbia national under-18 basketball team, winning gold at the 2017 FIBA Europe Under-18 Championship.

== See also ==
- List of European basketball players in the United States
