= Duško Vujošević =

Yugoslav and Serbian basketball coach (1959–2026)

- Душко Вујошевић
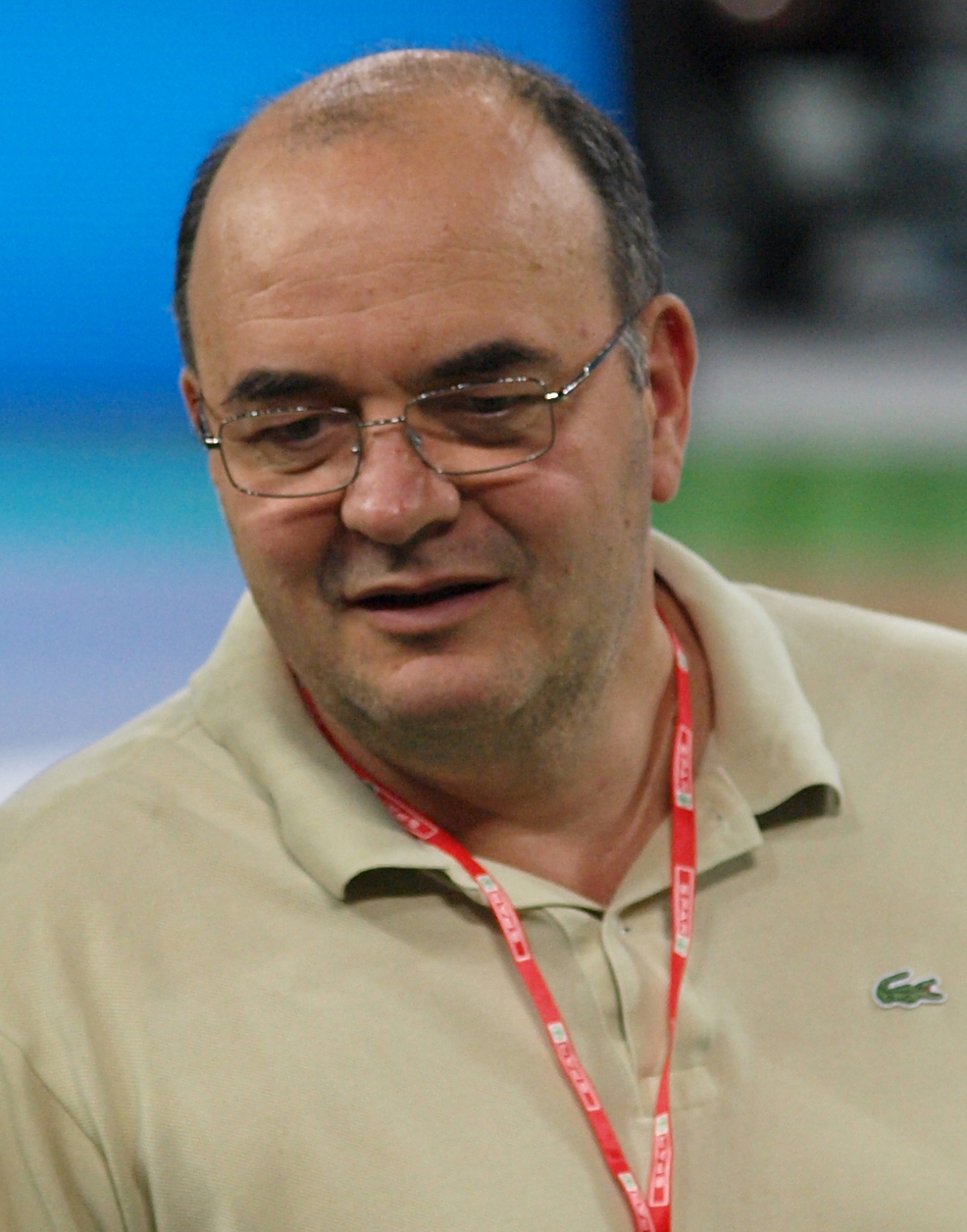
- Vujošević in 2011

President of JSD Partizan
- In office 4 October 2011 – 27 October 2015
- Preceded by: Danko Đunić
- Succeeded by: Milorad Vučelić

Personal details
- Born: 3 March 1959 Titograd, PR Montenegro, FPR Yugoslavia
- Died: 8 April 2026 (aged 67) Belgrade, Serbia
- Party: SDS (2022–2023)
- Occupation: Basketball coach; sports administrator
- Nickname(s): Dule, General
- Basketball career
- Position: Head coach
- Coaching career: 1976–1982 (youth); 1982–2021

Career history

Coaching
- 1976–1982: Partizan (youth)
- 1982–1983: OKK Beograd
- 1982–1983: →OKK Beograd (youth)
- 1984–1985: Mladost Zemun
- 1985–1987: Partizan (assistant)
- 1987–1989: Partizan
- 1989–1990: Oximesa
- 1990–1991: Partizan
- 1991–1992: Crvena zvezda
- 1992–1995: Brescia
- 1995–1997: Olimpia Pistoia
- 1997–1998: VL Pesaro
- 1998–1999: Budućnost (consultant)
- 1999–2001: Radnički Beograd
- 2001–2010: Partizan
- 2003: Serbia and Montenegro
- 2007–2010: Montenegro
- 2010: CSKA Moscow
- 2012–2015: Partizan
- 2016–2017: Limoges
- 2017–2018: Bosnia and Herzegovina
- 2019–2021: U-BT Cluj-Napoca (coach coordinator)
- 2022–2024: Studentski centar (consultant)

Career highlights
- As head coach: FIBA Korać Cup champion (1989); Yugoslav League champion (1987); 2× FR Yugoslavia League champion (2002, 2003); 3× Serbia and Montenegro League champion (2004–2006); 6× Serbian League champion (2007–2010, 2013, 2014); 5× ABA League champion (2007–2010, 2013); Yugoslav Cup winner (1989); FR Yugoslavia Cup winner (2002); 3× Serbian Cup winner (2008–2010); EuroLeague Coach of the Year (2009); Piva Ivković Award for Lifetime Achievement (2021); As consultant: FR Yugoslavia League champion (1999); Montenegrin Cup winner (2024); ABA League Supercup winner (2023); As coach coordinator: Romanian League champion (2021); Romanian Cup winner (2020)
Medals
Head Coach for Yugoslavia
European Championship for Juniors
Gold medal – first place	1988 Yugoslavia	Team

Duško Vujošević (Serbian Cyrillic: Душко Вујошевић; 3 March 1959 – 8 April 2026) was a Yugoslav and Serbian basketball coach of Montenegrin descent.

Vujošević served as the head coach of Partizan in four stints during which he led the club to record 12 national championship titles, 5 national cup titles and record five regional ABA League titles and the FIBA Korać Cup championship in 1989, being most successful coach in club's history with total of 23 trophies. In 2009, leading Partizan Vujošević won the EuroLeague Coach of the Year award.

== Early life ==
Born in Titograd, PR Montenegro, FPR Yugoslavia to parents from the Kuči region, Vujošević was only five years old when the family moved to Belgrade. He held Serbian citizeship ever since, declared himself a Yugoslav, Montenegrin and Serbian.

== Club coaching ==
=== Early career ===
Vujošević began his coaching career in 1976, as a 17-year-old. Before 1982, he coached various junior teams in Partizan's youth system. After that, he moved to OKK Beograd for one season and led the club's junior team to the Yugoslav title. The same year, he worked on the coaching staff of OKK Beograd's full squad. After completing the compulsory military service, Vujošević worked at Mladost Zemun for a season.

=== Partizan ===
==== Assistant to Vladislav Lučić ====
During the summer of 1985, Vujošević returned to Partizan organization, becoming assistant to the newly arrived head coach Vladislav Lučić. At the pre-season training camp on Mount Zlatibor, Vujošević contracted hepatitis that kept him away from the first team. Even after recovering, he spent most of the season dealing with the club's junior and cadet squads.

Partizan finished out the league season in 5th spot with a 12–10 overall record, which wasn't enough to make the league playoffs, but qualified the club to play in the following season's FIBA Korać Cup.

==== 1986–87: Taking over as head coach mid-season and winning the league ====
During the summer of 1986, Partizan management led by the club vice-president Dragan Kićanović initiated a major rebuilding effort with the arrival of 20-year-old small forward Žarko Paspalj from KK Budućnost and 18-year-old center Vlade Divac from Sloga Kraljevo who had already been playing for the national team. The head coach position was also looked at with several experienced names such as Vlade Đurović (fresh off winning the league with KK Zadar) being considered. However, in-demand Ðurović went to cross-town rivals Crvena zvezda, while Partizan decided to stay with its head coach Lale Lučić with Vujošević continuing as his assistant.

Lučić got fired in December 1986 and his assistant Vujošević took over as head coach on an interim basis.

Taking over the squad where some of the players were older than him, young Vujošević set about stamping his authority on the team. Guided by the 27-year-old Vujošević, the squad gelled well with talented youngsters being mentored by the more experienced roster players – Paspalj by Goran Grbović, Divac by Milenko Savović, and Đorđević by Željko Obradović. Partizan finished the regular league season in 2nd spot with an 18–4 record, behind defending European champion KK Cibona that amazingly went 22-0 without a single loss. In the playoffs, Partizan faced off against Boža Maljković-coached young KK Split (Jugoplastika) team at the semifinal stage, winning the best-of-three series 2–1. In the final, Partizan somewhat improbably met cross-town rivals Crvena zvezda after they managed to pull out an upset victory over powerhouse Cibona in the other semifinal series. Vujošević's team went ahead in the series, winning the opening game on its home court at Hala sportova. In game 2 on Red Star's home court at Hala Pionir, Partizan beat Vlade Ðurović's team again in a tense contest with many lead changes that was decided by Goran Grbović's three-pointer 23 seconds before the end that put crno-beli two points ahead and later Zoran Radović's failure to convert both free-throws. The game ended 88–89 and Partizan won the series 2-0 as well as the Yugoslav League title, its 4th overall and first for young head coach Vujošević who was only 28 years of age.

==== 1987–88: European Champions Cup Final Four run and losing the Yugoslav League playoff final ====
Winning the Yugoslav league title made Vujošević's interim head coaching position into a permanent one. In the 1987–88 season, Vujošević took Partizan to the European Champions Cup Final Four in Ghent and finished third. In the following season, Vujošević led Partizan to the Korać Cup title and the Yugoslav Cup trophy.

Vujošević was renowned for his work with young players and was credited with producing a generation of players who became famous worldwide after making their debut in Partizan (Divac, Paspalj, Predrag Danilović, Aleksandar Đorđević and others).

=== First time abroad: Oximesa ===
In the 1989–90 season, he was the head coach of the Spanish team CD Oximesa from Granada. Taking over Oximesa for Vujošević meant a reunion with power forward Goran Grbović who had previously been coached by Vujošević in Partizan for two seasons from 1986 until 1988. Furthermore, Vujošević brought along centre Milenko Savović from Partizan with him.

The season was not a successful one after the club failed to make it to the champions group, and later on in the campaign even had to fight hard to avoid relegation.

=== Back in Partizan for a season ===
After his poor season in Spain, Vujošević returned to Partizan during summer 1990 after only a year out of the club, succeeding Borislav Ćorković as head coach. Boosted by the return of Paspalj following his unsuccessful NBA stint, Vujošević's team was looking to challenge for major trophies. However, it yet again finished second-best to KK Split despite the reigning European champion losing one of its main players Dino Rađa over the summer as well as being forced to hire new coach Željko Pavličević after Božidar Maljković got lured away by Barcelona. After going 18–4 in the regular season (enough for 2nd place behind 19-3 Split), Partizan managed to defeat Cibona in the playoff semifinal series, but came up short again in the playoff finals versus Split that won the series 2–1.

=== Crvena zvezda ===
In the summer of 1991, 32-year-old Vujošević took the head coaching offer from the cross-town rivals KK Crvena zvezda. He led his new team in the 1991–92 season to the playoffs finals where he met his old team KK Partizan led by debutante head coach and Vujošević's former player Željko Obradović. Having won the Euroleage title two months earlier, Partizan ended up winning the league championship contest as well.

=== Brescia ===
From 1992 to 1998, Vujošević worked in Italy, coaching Brescia, Pistoia and Scavolini.

In the of summer 1992, he moved to Basket Brescia, a club competing in Serie B d'Eccellenza, the third-tier basketball league in Italy. Following the 1992-93 season, Brescia got relegated to the fourth-tier Serie B2.

Vujošević stayed on, coaching the club in the fourth-tier Italian league during the 1993–94 season and winning promotion back to the third-tier.

After one more season in the third-tier, the coach moved on.

=== Olimpia Pistoia ===
Joining Olimpia Pistoia in summer 1995, Vujošević finally got a chance to coach in the top-tier Serie A. Leading the team to the 9th place league finish, they made the playoffs. In the playoffs, Pistoia defeated 8th-placed Viola Reggio Calabria 2-games-to-0 before getting eliminated by the defending champions Virtus Bologna in the next round.

The following season, 1996-97, the team finished the regular season in 10th spot, again making the playoffs. This time they were eliminated at the very first hurdle against Pallacanestro Varese.

=== Victoria Libertas Pesaro ===
In the summer of 1997, Vujosevic made a move to another bottom-dwelling Serie A club, joining Victoria Libertas, the once storied club that had fallen on hard times financially in the meantime.

Under Vujošević's guidance in the 1997-98 league season, the club ended getting relegated.

After returning from Italy, Vujošević joined the coaching staff of Budućnost as a consultant to head coach Muta Nikolić for the 1998–99 season. The following two seasons, from 1999 to 2001, he was the head coach of Radnički Beograd.

=== Partizan, CSKA and Partizan again ===
After his return to Partizan in 2001, he won nine consecutive national championships (2002–2010), four cups (2002, 2008, 2009, 2010), and four consecutive Adriatic League titles (2007–2010), thus becoming the most successful coach in the club's history. Also, under his management Partizan made it to the Euroleague Final Four, in the 2009–10 Euroleague season.

He won the Alexander Gomelsky Coach of the Year award as the best Euroleague coach of the 2008–09 season. On 25 June 2010, Vujošević signed three-year contract with Russian club CSKA Moscow. Only few months later, Vujošević and CSKA Moscow decided to part their ways after elimination in the first stage of Euroleague.

On 25 June 2012, after two years of not working as head coach, Vujošević signed a long-term contract with Partizan.

On 8 September 2015, he parted ways with Partizan. The coach's departure from the state-funded KK Partizan occurred amid controversy and acrimony over his criticism directed at the ruling party in Serbia, especially Prime Minister Aleksandar Vučić. In subsequent interviews Vujošević made claims that Vučić's government had effectively forced his removal by presenting the club management with a situation of cutting its funding if he remained its coach.

=== Limoges CSP ===
On 13 January 2016, Vujošević took over French club Limoges CSP. While coaching Limoges, they finished 10th in the LNB Pro A, and he led his team to the round of 16 in the French Basketball Cup.

He left the team at the end of the 2016–2017 season.

=== U-BT Cluj-Napoca ===
On 18 June 2019, Vujošević signed a one-year deal with Romanian club U-BT Cluj-Napoca as a coach coordinator. In the 2019–20 season, the club finished 2nd in the Liga Națională group A, Romania's first division, before the season got cancelled due to the COVID-19 pandemic.

On 24 June 2020, he signed a one-year extension with the club. That season, the club won the Liga Națională, and the Romanian Basketball Cup. At the end of the season, he left the club, thereby concluding his career.

== National team coaching career ==
=== SFR Yugoslavia youth teams ===
==== 1988 European Championship for Juniors ====
As head coach of the Yugoslavia junior national team (players born in 1970), Vujošević won the 1988 European Championship for Juniors held on home soil in Titov Vrbas and Srbobran. Playing at home with a talented squad led by Predrag Danilović, Arijan Komazec, Žan Tabak, Rastko Cvetković, Oliver Popović, and Dževad Alihodžić, Yugoslavia won all of its games en route to the trophy.

==== 1991 FIBA Under-19 World Championship ====
In the summer of 1991, Vujošević selected the Yugoslav U19 team for the World Under-19 Championship in Edmonton, Canada. With Veljko Mršić, Dejan Bodiroga, Dragan Tarlać, Borko Radović, Željko Rebrača, Teo Čizmić, and Željko Topalović on its roster, the team made it out of the initial group stage with a 2–1 record (winning over Soviet Union and Syria, but losing to Brazil).

In the following group stage, Vujošević's Yugoslavia faced Italy (loss), Romania (win), and Spain (loss), finishing tied for the second spot with Spain with a 1–2 record, however, Yugoslavs advanced because of better basket difference thus qualifying for the semifinals.

In the semifinals, Yugoslavia faced the United States led by Lance Miller, Bryan Caver, Wesley Person, Khalid Reeves, Ed Stokes, and Antonio Lang, losing a close game 74–76.

In the 3rd place match versus Argentina featuring Jorge Racca, Gabriel Cocha Silva, Gabriel Diaz, Alejandro Montecchia, Carlos Simoni, Claudio Farabello, and Rubén Wolkowyski, Vujošević's team lost another close contest 71-74 thus finishing just out of the medals with an overall 3–5 record.

=== Serbia-Montenegro ===
On 22 March 2003, Vujošević's appointment as head coach of the reigning European and World champions Serbia and Montenegro national basketball team was announced, with the upcoming EuroBasket 2003 in Sweden being his first order of business. Taking over for Svetislav Pešić and signing on for two years plus an optional third year with the Basketball Federation of Serbia and Montenegro (KSSCG), Vujošević took the national team head coaching job in parallel with his club head coaching duties at KK Partizan.

==== EuroBasket 2003 ====
Due to many of the team's stars — most notably Dejan Bodiroga and Vlade Divac — taking the summer off from the national team, Vujošević turned to a mix of young prospects as well as players who had been on the national team fringes previously. The preparation stage for the competition was further marked by Vujošević's mid-August 2003 decision to kick thirty-one-year-old veteran center Dejan Koturović out of the team's training camp, reportedly due to lack of discipline. The decision turned into an immediate public row between the two. The coach and the player soon made up publicly with Koturović being reinstated in the team and eventually even making the final 12-man roster Vujošević took to the tournament. Six final roster spots were filled with national team debutantes at major competitions—eighteen-year-old Kosta Perović, twenty-one-year-old Vule Avdalović, twenty-four-year-old Ognjen Aškrabić, twenty-seven-year-old Đuro Ostojić, twenty-seven-year-old Dušan Vukčević, and twenty-nine-year-old Nebojša Bogavac.

At the EuroBasket 2003 in Sweden, Serbia-Montenegro experienced hard time getting into the quarterfinals where it lost by 16 points to Lithuania that would go on to win the championship. Finishing the tournament in sixth place was seen as disappointment for Serbia-Montenegro.

=== Montenegro ===
In April 2007, Vujošević accepted the head coach position of the Montenegro national basketball team. He stayed at the position until 20 November 2010, reportedly resigning out of desire to focus solely on his head coaching job at CSKA Moscow that he had been performing for several months already. Ironically, CSKA fired Vujošević only five days later.

=== Bosnia and Herzegovina ===
In April 2017, he was named as the head coach of the Bosnia and Herzegovina national team. He held this position until August 2018.

== Coaching record ==
Legend
G	Games coached	W	Games won	L	Games lost	W–L %	Win-loss %

Note: The EuroLeague is not the only competition in which the team played during the season. He also coached in domestic competition, and regional competition if applicable.

=== Euroleague ===
Team	Year	G	W	L	W–L%	Result
Partizan	1987–88	18	13	5	.722	Won in 3rd place game
Partizan	2001–02	14	6	8	.429	Eliminated in group play
Partizan	2002–03	13	4	9	.308	Eliminated in group play
Partizan	2003–04	14	6	8	.429	Eliminated in group play
Partizan	2004–05	14	2	12	.143	Eliminated in group play
Partizan	2005–06	14	2	12	.143	Eliminated in group play
Partizan	2006–07	20	8	12	.400	Eliminated in Top 16 Stage
Partizan	2007–08	23	11	12	.478	Lost in Quarterfinal Playoffs
Partizan	2008–09	19	9	10	.474	Lost in Quarterfinal Playoffs
Partizan	2009–10	22	11	11	.500	Lost in 3rd place game
CSKA Moscow	2010–11	6	1	5	.167	(fired)
Partizan	2012–13	10	2	8	.200	Eliminated in group play
Partizan	2013–14	24	7	17	.292	Eliminated in Top 16 Stage
Career		211	82	129	.389	

== Political activity ==
On 24 February 2022, it was announced that the opposition coalition around the Social Democratic Party named Vujošević as their ballot carrier and mayoral candidate for the upcoming Belgrade City Assembly election. Vujošević's list won 2.92% of the popular vote, failing to gain a seat in the City Assembly.

== Personal life and death ==
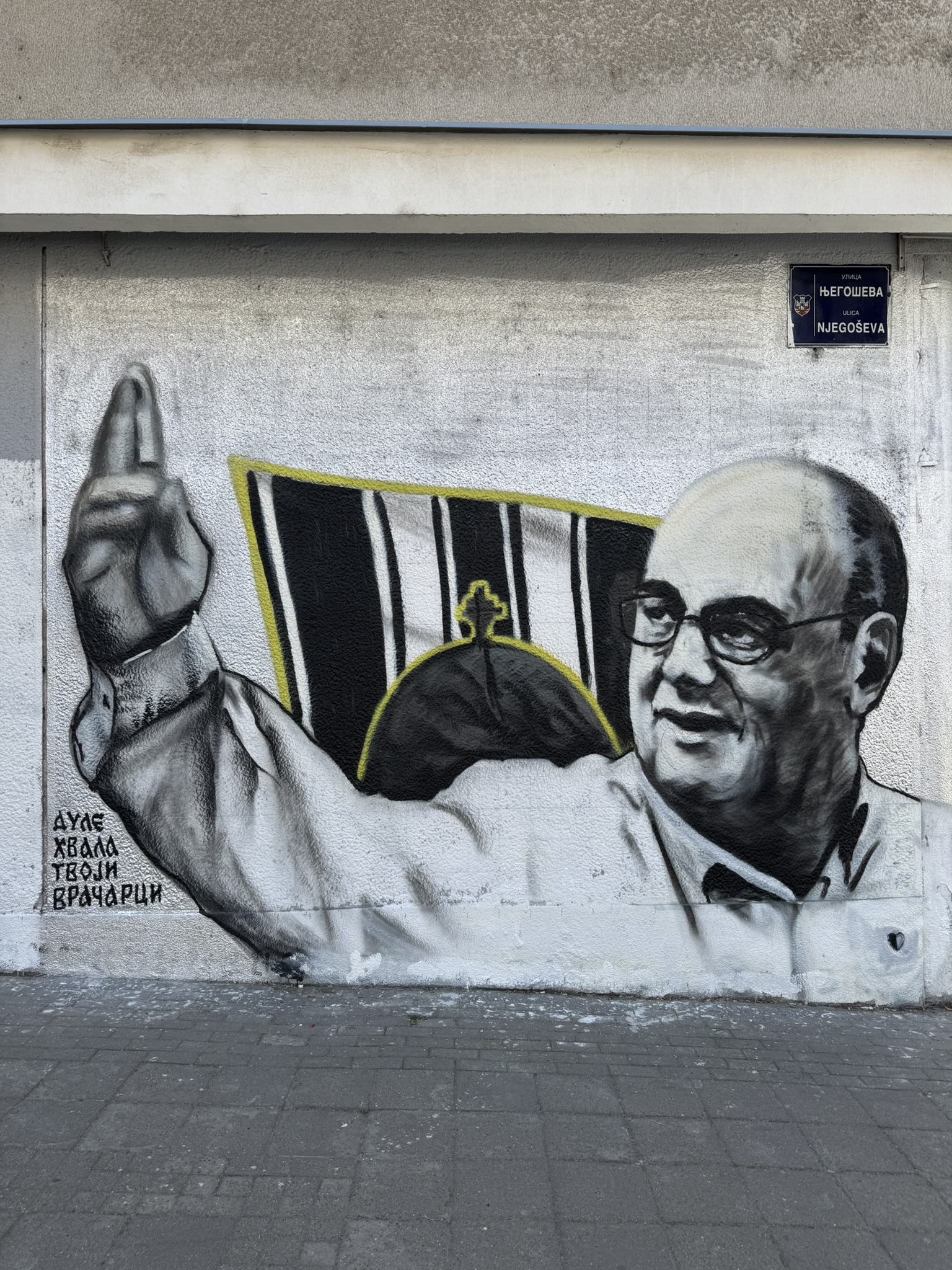
A mural dedicated to Duško Vujošević in Njegoševa Street in Belgrade.

Vujošević sufferred from diabetes, which over the years caused the emergence of gangrene. In September 2017, he had to amputate the fourth toe on his left foot due to gangrene.

In May 2018, he was made an honorary citizen of Sarajevo for his extraordinary contribution to the development of sport and the affirmation of Sarajevo and Bosnia and Herzegovina.

In 2025, Vujošević underwent a kidney transplant. He died in Belgrade on 8 April 2026, at the age of 67. He had been hospitalized in Belgrade in March after experiencing heart and kidney issues following his kidney transplant.

== See also ==
- List of ABA League-winning coaches
- List of BLS-winning head coaches
- List of Radivoj Korać Cup-winning head coaches
