= Nenad Trunić =

Serbian basketball player and coach

Personal information
- Born: 6 February 1968 (age 58) Kragujevac, SR Serbia, Yugoslavia
- Listed height: 1.85 m (6 ft 1 in)

Career information
- NBA draft: 1990: undrafted
- Playing career: 1986–2004
- Position: Point guard
- Number: 4, 5, 10, 12
- Coaching career: 2009–present

Career history
- 1986–1990: Sloboda Dita
- 1990–1991: Smelt Olimpija
- 1991–1992: Crvena zvezda
- 1993–1994: OKK Beograd
- 1994: Baker Livorno
- 1994–1995: APU Udine
- 1998–1999: Lugano Snakes
- 1999–2000: Oyak Renault
- 2001: Legia Warsaw
- Albacomp
- Apollon Limassol
- Klosterneuburg
- 2003–2004: Radnički Kragujevac
Medals
Men's basketball
Representing Yugoslavia
European Championship for Cadets
Gold medal – first place	1985 Bulgaria	Team
Head coach for Serbia
U16 European Championship
Bronze medal – third place	2009 Lithuania	U16 National Team

Nenad Trunić (Serbian Cyrillic: Ненад Трунић; born 6 February 1968) is a Serbian professor of basketball, as well as basketball coach and former player.

== Playing career ==
=== Professional career ===
A point guard, Trunić played for Sloboda Dita, Smelt Olimpija, Crvena zvezda, Radnički Beograd, OKK Beograd, Libertas Livorno, APU Udine, Oyak Renault, FV Lugano, Legia Warsaw, Albacomp, Apollon Limassol, Klosterneuburg, and Radnički Kragujevac.

=== National team career ===
In August 1985, Trunić was a member of the Yugoslav cadet team that won the gold medal at the European Championship for Cadets in Ruse, Bulgaria. Over seven tournament games, he averaged 4.2 points per game.

== Post-playing career ==
During the 2005–06 NBA season, Trunić was an international scout for the Sacramento Kings in charge for the Eastern Europe.

During the late-2000s, Trunić was a member of the Basketball Federation of Serbia Experts Council with Božidar Maljković, Dušan Ivković, Svetislav Pešić, and Ranko Žeravica.

Trunić has been a lecturer at FIBA Europe Coaching Clinics since 2011, and at the FIBA Europe Coaching Certificate Program since 2013.

During the late-2010s, Trunić was an advisor of the Iran national team and youth system coordinator at the Iran Basketball Federation.

=== National team coaching career ===
In 2009, Trunić was the head coach of the Serbia men's national under-16 team that won a bronze medal at the FIBA Europe Under-16 Championship in Kaunas, Lithuania.

In 2017, Trunić was the head coach of the Serbia men's national under-17 team at the FIBA Under-17 World Championship in Hamburg, Germany. His team finished 5th with a 4–4 record.

In November 2021, Trunić was named an assistant coach for the Serbia national team under Svetislav Pešić.

== Academic career ==
Trunić earned his bachelor's degree in basketball in 1992, his master's degree in 2004, both from the University of Belgrade. He earned a doctorate in Belgrade in 2006, with the thesis Forecasting and strategy for creating top basketball players.

Between 2004 and 2014, Trunić was as a professor at the Belgrade School of Sports and Health Studies, as a lead lecturer for courses: Theory and Methodology of Basketball, Basics of Sports Training, Pedagogical Practice in Basketball, Methodology of Techniques and Tactics in Youth System Training in Sports. At the same school, he was the head of the study program Sports Coach and a mentor of a large number of graduate theses in basketball and sports training theory. Also, from 2006 to 2010, he was a professor at the Borislav Stanković Basketball Academy under the Megatrend University.

Since 2014, Trunić has been working as a professor at the Faculty of Physical Education and Sports Management at Singidunum University in Belgrade, as a lead lecturer for courses: Basketball, Training Technology in Sports, Identification and Development of Talents in Sports, and Prioritization of Training in Sports. In the 2016–17 school year, he was the dean of the same faculty.

== Books ==
- Trunić, Nenad (2018). The Basic Basketball Skills. Belgrade: Singidunum University.
- Rapaić, D.; Nedović, G.; Trunić, N.; Lazarević, P.; Mladenović, S.; Lazarević, S.; Antić, N.; Miletić, M.; Jovanović, J. (2015). Multidisciplinarity of Physical Culture for People with Disabilities. Belgrade: Singidunum University.
- Trunić, Nenad (2007). A Training of Young Basketball Players at Different Age. Belgrade: Visoka škola za sport.
