= Germany men's national under-16 and under-17 basketball team =

Germany
- FIBA zone: FIBA Europe
- National federation: Deutscher Basketball Bund (DBB)
- Coach: Dirk Bauermann

U17 World Cup
- Appearances: 2
- Medals: None

U16 EuroBasket
- Appearances: 29
- Medals: Bronze: 2 (1981, 1983)

U16 EuroBasket Division B
- Appearances: 4
- Medals: Gold: 3 (2005, 2008, 2022)
Home	Away

The Germany men's national under-16 and under-17 basketball team is a national basketball team of Germany, administered by the German Basketball Federation (Deutscher Basketball Bund). It represents the country in men's international under-16 and under-17 basketball competitions.

Former members include Lukas Herzog and Ariel Hukporti who were both part of the Porsche Basketball Academy, the youth division of Riesen Ludwigsburg.

== FIBA U16 EuroBasket participations ==
Year	Division A	Division B
1971	9th	
1973	13th	
1975	9th	
1977	10th	
1979	4th	
1981	3rd place, bronze medalist(s)	
1983	3rd place, bronze medalist(s)	
1985	4th	
1987	6th	
1989	9th	
1991	7th	
1993	10th	
2004	16th	
2005		1st place, gold medalist(s)
2006	15th	
2007		10th
2008		1st place, gold medalist(s)

Year	Division A	Division B
2009	11th	
2010	13th	
2011	8th	
2012	5th	
2013	8th	
2014	7th	
2015	7th	
2016	9th	
2017	13th	
2018	9th	
2019	14th	
2022		1st place, gold medalist(s)
2023	5th	
2024	10th	
2025	9th	
2026	5th	

== FIBA U17 World Cup record ==
Year	Pos.	Pld	W	L	Ref.
(Germany) 2010	8th	8	3	5	
(Lithuania) 2012	Did not qualify				
(United Arab Emirates) 2014	Did not qualify				
(Spain) 2016	Did not qualify				
(Argentina) 2018	Did not qualify				
(Spain) 2022	Did not qualify				
(Turkey) 2024	11th	7	3	4	
(Turkey) 2026	Did not qualify				
(Greece) 2028	To be determined				
Total	2/9	15	6	9	

== See also ==
- Germany men's national basketball team
- Germany men's national under-19 basketball team
- Germany women's national under-17 basketball team
