= 1971 FIBA Europe Under-16 Championship =

1971 EuroBasket Under-16
1st FIBA Europe Under-16 Championship

Tournament details
- Host country: Italy
- Dates: 10–17 July 1971
- Teams: 12 (from 1 confederation)
- Venue(s): (in 1 host city)

Final positions
- Champions: Yugoslavia (1st title)

The 1971 FIBA Europe Under-16 Championship (known at that time as 1971 European Championship for Cadets) was the first edition of the FIBA Europe Under-16 Championship. The city of Gorizia, in Italy, hosted the tournament. Yugoslavia won their first title.

== Teams ==
- Austria
- France
- Germany
- Greece
- Israel
- Italy
- Soviet Union
- Spain
- Sweden
- Switzerland
- Turkey
- Yugoslavia

== Preliminary round ==
The twelve teams were allocated in two groups of six teams each.

Team advanced to Semifinals
Team competed in 5th–8th playoffs
Team competed in 9th–12th playoffs

=== Group A ===
Team	Pld	W	L	PF	PA	PD	Pts
Soviet Union	5	5	0	371	199	+172	10
Spain	5	4	1	295	200	+95	9
Greece	5	3	2	265	242	+23	8
Turkey	5	2	3	244	264	−20	7
Sweden	5	1	4	229	389	−160	6
Austria	5	0	5	204	314	−110	5

=== Group B ===
Team	Pld	W	L	PF	PA	PD	Pts
Italy	5	5	0	363	265	+128	10
Yugoslavia	5	4	1	361	257	+104	9
Israel	5	3	2	369	312	+57	8
France	5	2	3	328	318	+10	7
Germany	5	1	4	294	351	−57	6
Switzerland	5	0	5	210	452	−242	5

== Knockout stage ==
=== 9th–12th playoffs ===
Playoffs
Gorizia
Austria	58
Germany	80
Gorizia
Sweden	76
Switzerland	31

Ninth place
Gorizia
Germany	77
Sweden	63
Eleventh place
Gorizia
Austria	90
Switzerland	54

=== 5th–8th playoffs ===
Playoffs
Gorizia
Israel	91
Turkey	50
Gorizia
Greece	65
France	64

Fifth place
Gorizia
Israel	65
Greece	74
Seventh place
Gorizia
Turkey	59
France	66

=== Championship ===
Semifinals
Gorizia
Italy	66
Spain	58
Gorizia
Soviet Union	65
Yugoslavia	67

Third place
Gorizia
Italy	60
Yugoslavia	74
Final
Gorizia
Spain	55
Soviet Union	56

== Final standings ==
Rank	Team	Record
Gold medal	Yugoslavia	7–0
Silver medal	Italy	6–1
Bronze medal	Soviet Union	6–1
4th	Spain	4–3
5th	Greece	5–2
6th	Israel	4–3
7th	France	3–4
8th	Turkey	2–5
9th	Germany	3–4
10th	Sweden	2–5
11th	Austria	1–6
12th	Switzerland	0–7

1971 European Championship for Cadets

Yugoslavia
First title

Team Roster

Dragan Todorić, Predrag Tripković, Ante Zaloker, Dragan Kićanović, Marko Martinović, Milan Milićević, Zoran Biorac, Rajko Žižić, Mirza Delibašić, Željko Morelj, Radmilo Lukovac, and Mirko Grgin. Head coach: Mirko Novosel.
