= Soviet Union men's national under-16 basketball team =

Soviet Union
- FIBA zone: FIBA Europe
- National federation: Soviet Basketball Federation

U16 European Championship
- Appearances: 11
- Medals: Gold: 3 (1973, 1975, 1981); Bronze: 3 (1971, 1977, 1987)

The Soviet Union men's national under-16 basketball team was a men's junior national basketball team of the Soviet Union. It represented the country in international under-16 (under age 16) basketball competitions, until the dissolution of the Soviet Union in 1991. After 1992, the successor countries all set up their own national teams.

== FIBA U16 European Championship participations ==
Year	Result in Division A
1971	3rd place, bronze medalist(s)
1973	1st place, gold medalist(s)
1975	1st place, gold medalist(s)
1977	3rd place, bronze medalist(s)
1979	5th
1981	1st place, gold medalist(s)
1983	6th
1985	5th
1987	3rd place, bronze medalist(s)
1989	5th
1991	5th

== See also ==
- Soviet Union men's national basketball team
- Soviet Union men's national under-19 basketball team
- Soviet Union women's national under-16 basketball team
- Russia men's national basketball team
- Russia men's national under-17 basketball team
