= Aleksandar Milivojša =

Serbian basketball player

Personal information
- Born: 13 March 1964 (age 62) Novi Sad, Serbia, Yugoslavia
- Listed height: 2.07 m (6 ft 9 in)

Career information
- Playing career: 1981–1998
- Position: Center
- Number: 7, 12, 14

Career history
- 1981–1986: Crvena zvezda
- 1986–1987: MZT Skopje
- 1989–1991: NAP Novi Sad
- 1997–1998: Dombóvári VMSE
Medals
Men's basketball
Representing Yugoslavia
European Championship for Juniors
Silver medal – second place	1982 Bulgaria	Junior team

Aleksandar Milivojša (Serbian Cyrillic: Александар Миливојша; born 13 March 1964) is a Serbian former professional basketball player.

== Playing career ==
A center, Milivojša played for Crvena zvezda, MZT Skopje, NAP Novi Sad, and Hungarian team Dombóvári VMSE.

== National team career ==
In August 1981, Milivojša was a member of the Yugoslavia Cadets team at the European Championship for Cadets in Greece. Over seven tournament games, he averaged 9.1 points per game.

In August 1982, Milivojša was a member of the Yugoslavia junior (under-18) team that won the silver medal at the European Championship for Juniors in Bulgaria. Over seven tournament games, he averaged 3.3 points per game. In August 1983, he was a member of the Junior (under-19) national team at the World Championship for Juniors in Palma de Mallorca, Spain. Over seven tournament games, he averaged 3.6 points per game.

== See also ==
- List of KK Crvena zvezda players with 100 games played
