= Samir Mujanović =

Bosnian retired basketball player

Personal information
- Born: June 5, 1966 (age 60) Travnik, SR Bosnia and Herzegovina, SFR Yugoslavia
- Listed height: 2.07 m (6 ft 9 in)

Career information
- Playing career: 1986–2007
- Position: Power forward

Career history
- 1986–1992: Bosna
- 1992–1998: Kvarner
- 1998–1999: Falco KC Szombathely
- 2004–2005: Panthers Fürstenfeld
- 2005–2007: Egis Körmend

Samir Mujanović (born 5 June 1966) is a Bosnian retired professional basketball player who played for several clubs in Europe during his career. He competed in domestic leagues in Yugoslavia, Croatia, Austria, and Hungary, and also appeared in European club competitions such as the FIBA Korać Cup. Mujanović also represented the Yugoslav youth national team at international level.

== Club career ==
During the late 1980s and early 1990s, Mujanović played for KK Bosna, one of the leading basketball clubs in Yugoslavia.

In the 1989–90 season, Bosna competed in the FIBA Korać Cup. In a quarterfinal game played in Sarajevo, Bosna defeated Turkish club Anadolu Efes S.K. (then known as Efes Pilsen) by a score of 117–78, with Mujanović scoring 10 points. With the start of the Bosnian war, he moved to Croatia where he became a longstanding member of KK Kvarner.

Later in his career, Mujanović played in several European leagues, including in Austria and Hungary.

During the 2004–05 season he played for Panthers Fürstenfeld in the Austrian Basketball Bundesliga, appearing in 21 games and scoring 174 total points.

He later joined Egis Körmend in Hungary's top basketball league, where he played during the 2005–06 and 2006–07 seasons. In the 2005–06 season he recorded 191 points and 71 rebounds in 26 games.

Mujanović also played in European competitions with Falco KC Szombathely. In the Korać Cup he averaged 13.6 points per game across the 1998 and 1999 tournaments.

== National team career ==
Mujanović represented the Yugoslav youth national team at the 1983 FIBA Europe Under-16 Championship, winning the gold medal. He played four games and averaged 3.8 points per game during the tournament.
