= 1977 FIBA Europe Under-16 Championship =

1977 FIBA U16 European Championship
4th FIBA Under-16 European Basketball Championship

Tournament details
- Host country: France
- Dates: 22–30 July 1977
- Teams: 12 (from 1 federation)
- Venue: (in 2 host cities)

Final positions
- Champions: Turkey (1st title)

The 1977 FIBA Europe Under-16 Championship (known at that time as 1977 FIBA European Championship for Cadets) was the 4th edition of the FIBA Europe Under-16 Championship. The cities of Le Touquet and Berck, in France, hosted the tournament. Turkey won their first title.

== Teams ==
- Belgium
- Bulgaria
- France
- Greece
- Israel
- Italy
- Poland
- Soviet Union
- Spain
- Turkey
- West Germany
- Yugoslavia

== Preliminary round ==
The twelve teams were allocated in two groups of six teams each.

Team advanced to Semifinals
Team competed in 5th–8th playoffs
Team competed in 9th–12th playoffs

=== Group A ===
Team	Pld	W	L	PF	PA	Pts
Soviet Union	5	5	0	451	259	10
Italy	5	4	1	337	329	9
France	5	3	2	305	304	8
Belgium	5	2	3	318	373	7
Bulgaria	5	1	4	342	387	6
Poland	5	0	5	332	433	5

=== Group B ===
Team	Pld	W	L	PF	PA	Pts
Turkey	5	5	0	421	309	10
Yugoslavia	5	4	1	464	373	9
Spain	5	3	2	364	360	8
Greece	5	2	3	339	375	7
Israel	5	1	4	332	405	6
West Germany	5	0	5	285	383	5

== Knockout stage ==
=== 9th–12th playoffs ===
Playoffs
Bulgaria	76
West Germany	80
Israel	91
Poland	104

Ninth place
West Germany	65
Poland	78
Eleventh place
Bulgaria	78
Israel	89

=== 5th–8th playoffs ===
Playoffs
Spain	89
Belgium	77
France	66
Greece	56

Fifth place
Spain	76
France	65
Seventh place
Belgium	74
Greece	62

=== Championship ===
Semifinals
Turkey	76
Italy	56
Yugoslavia	81
Soviet Union	72

Final
Turkey	68
Yugoslavia	66
Third place
Italy	74
Soviet Union	95

1977 FIBA Europe U-16 Championship

Turkey
First title

== Final standings ==
Rank	Team
Gold medal	Turkey
Silver medal	Yugoslavia
Bronze medal	Soviet Union
4th	Italy
5th	Spain
6th	France
7th	Belgium
8th	Greece
9th	Poland
10th	West Germany
11th	Israel
12th	Bulgaria
