= Petar Arsić =

Serbian basketball player

Personal information
- Born: November 6, 1973 (age 53) Belgrade, SR Serbia, Yugoslavia
- Listed height: 6 ft 10 in (2.08 m)
- Listed weight: 195 lb (88 kg)

Career information
- College: West Virginia (1992–1993); Delaware (1994–1997)
- NBA draft: 1997: undrafted
- Playing career: 1990–2008
- Position: Power forward

Career history
- 1990–1992: Radnički Belgrade
- 1997–1998: Muratpaşa
- 1998–1999: Bnei Herzliya
- 1999–2000: Baltimore Bayrunners
- 2000–2001: Union Olimpija
- 2001: KK Budućnost
- 2002: Elektra Šoštanj
- 2002: SLUC Nancy
- 2002–2003: Maccabi Haifa
- 2003: Strasbourg IG
- 2003–2004: Spirou Charleroi
- 2004: Azovmash
- 2004–2005: Spirou Charleroi
- 2005: BC Kyiv
- 2005: Kolossos Rodou
- 2006: Spirou Charleroi
- 2006: Apollon Limassol
- 2006: Maccabi Rishon LeZion
- 2007: Apollon Limassol
- 2007–2008: Zob Ahan Esfahan
Medals
Men's basketball
Representing Yugoslavia
European Championship for Cadets
Silver medal – second place	1989 Spain	U16 Team

Petar Arsić (born 6 November 1973) is a Serbian former professional basketball player.

== International career ==
Arsić was a member of the SFR Yugoslavia national cadet team that won the silver medal at the 1989 European Championship for Cadets in Spain. Over two tournament games, he averaged 10.0 points per game.
