= 1983 FIBA Europe Under-16 Championship =

1983 EuroBasket Under-16
7th FIBA Europe Under-16 Championship

Tournament details
- Host country: West Germany
- Dates: 16–24 July 1983
- Teams: 12
- Venue(s): (in 2 host cities)

Final positions
- Champions: Yugoslavia (3rd title)

The 1983 FIBA Europe Under-16 Championship (known at that time as 1983 European Championship for Cadets) was the 7th edition of the FIBA Europe Under-16 Championship. The cities of Tübingen and Ludwigsburg, in West Germany, hosted the tournament. Yugoslavia won the trophy for the third time and tied with the Soviet Union as the most winning countries in the tournament.

== Teams ==
- Finland
- France
- Greece
- Hungary
- Italy
- Netherlands
- Soviet Union
- Spain
- Sweden
- Turkey
- West Germany
- Yugoslavia

== Preliminary round ==
The twelve teams were allocated in two groups of six teams each.

Team advanced to Semifinals
Team competed in 5th–8th playoffs
Team competed in 9th–12th playoffs

=== Group A ===
Team	Pld	W	L	PF	PA	Pts
Yugoslavia	5	4	1	450	402	9
Spain	5	4	1	448	376	9
Italy	5	4	1	412	350	9
France	5	2	3	404	460	7
Turkey	5	1	4	366	412	6
Hungary	5	0	5	403	483	5

=== Group B ===
Team	Pld	W	L	PF	PA	Pts
West Germany	5	4	1	347	306	9
Greece	5	4	1	410	348	9
Soviet Union	5	3	2	350	357	8
Netherlands	5	2	3	369	394	7
Sweden	5	1	4	332	387	6
Finland	5	1	4	335	351	6

== Knockout stage ==
=== 9th–12th playoffs ===
Playoffs
Hungary	97
Sweden	100
Finland	74
Turkey	86

Ninth place
Sweden	76
Turkey	85
Eleventh place
Hungary	85
Finland	63

=== 5th–8th playoffs ===
Playoffs
Soviet Union	84
France	48
Italy	85
Netherlands	68

Fifth place
Soviet Union	60
Italy	100
Seventh place
France	76
Netherlands	64

=== Championship ===
Semifinals
Yugoslavia	72
Greece	67
Spain	81
West Germany	57

Final
Yugoslavia	89
Spain	86
Third place
Greece	69
West Germany	72

== Final standings ==
Rank	Team
Gold medal	Yugoslavia
Silver medal	Spain
Bronze medal	West Germany
4th	Greece
5th	Italy
6th	Soviet Union
7th	France
8th	Netherlands
9th	Turkey
10th	Sweden
11th	Hungary
12th	Finland

1983 European Championship for Cadets

Yugoslavia
Third title

Team roster

Zoran Livljanić, Bane Prelević, Zoran Jevtić, Jure Zdovc, Miroslav Pecarski, Ivo Nakić, Samir Mujanović, Igor Lukačić, Ivica Mavrenski, Žarko Paspalj, Denis Perić, and Luka Pavićević. Head coach: Rusmir Halilović.
