= France men's national under-17 basketball team =

France
- FIBA zone: FIBA Europe
- National federation: FFBB
- Coach: Tony Parker
- Nickname: Les Bleus (The Blues)

U17 World Cup
- Appearances: 7
- Medals: Silver: 1 (2018); Bronze: 1 (2022)

U16 EuroBasket
- Appearances: 36
- Medals: Gold: 4 (2004, 2014, 2017, 2024); Silver: 4 (2005, 2012, 2019, 2026); Bronze: 2 (2022, 2023)
First	Second

The France men's national under-16 and under-17 basketball team is the men's junior national basketball team representing France in international under-16 and under-17 basketball competitions. It is administered by the Fédération Française de Basket-Ball (French Basketball Federation).

== Competitive record ==
=== FIBA U17 World Cup ===
Year	Pos.	Pld	W	L
(Germany) 2010	Did not qualify			
(Lithuania) 2012	10th	7	2	5
(United Arab Emirates) 2014	8th	7	4	3
(Spain) 2016	6th	7	4	3
(Argentina) 2018	2nd place, silver medalist(s)	7	6	1
(Spain) 2022	3rd place, bronze medalist(s)	7	6	1
(Turkey) 2024	9th	7	4	3
(Turkey) 2026	5th	7	5	2
(Greece) 2028	To be determined			
Total	7/9	49	31	18

=== FIBA U16 EuroBasket ===
Year	Position
(Italy) 1971	7th
(Italy) 1973	7th
(Greece) 1975	15th
(France) 1977	6th
(Syria) 1979	Did not qualify
(Greece) 1981	10th
(Germany) 1983	7th
(Bulgaria) 1985	12th
(Hungary) 1987	5th
(Spain) 1989	8th
(Greece) 1991	Did not qualify
(Turkey) 1993	7th
(Portugal) 1995	6th

Year	Position
(Belgium) 1997	4th
(Slovenia) 1999	4th
(Latvia) 2001	5th
(Spain) 2003	5th
(Greece) 2004	1st place, gold medalist(s)
(Spain) 2005	2nd place, silver medalist(s)
(Spain) 2006	5th
(Greece) 2007	6th
(Italy) 2008	4th
(Lithuania) 2009	7th
(Montenegro) 2010	6th
(Czech Republic) 2011	4th
(Lithuania) 2012	2nd place, silver medalist(s)

Year	Position
(Ukraine) 2013	5th
(Latvia) 2014	1st place, gold medalist(s)
(Lithuania) 2015	5th
(Poland) 2016	6th
(Montenegro) 2017	1st place, gold medalist(s)
(Serbia) 2018	4th
(Italy) 2019	2nd place, silver medalist(s)
(North Macedonia) 2022	3rd place, bronze medalist(s)
(North Macedonia) 2023	3rd place, bronze medalist(s)
(Greece) 2024	1st place, gold medalist(s)
(Georgia (country)) 2025	5th
(Romania) 2026	2nd place, silver medalist(s)
Total	36/38

== See also ==
- France men's national basketball team
- France men's national under-19 basketball team
- France women's national under-17 basketball team
- France men's national 3x3 team
