= 1987 FIBA Europe Under-16 Championship =

1987 FIBA U16 European Championship
9th FIBA Under-16 European Basketball Championship

Tournament details
- Host country: Hungary
- Dates: 8–15 August 1987
- Teams: 12 (from 1 federation)
- Venue: (in 2 host cities)

Final positions
- Champions: Yugoslavia (5th title)

The 1987 FIBA Europe Under-16 Championship (known at that time as 1987 FIBA European Championship for Cadets) was the 9th edition of the FIBA Europe Under-16 Championship. The cities of Székesfehérvár and Kaposvár, in Hungary, hosted the tournament. Yugoslavia won the trophy for the fifth time. It was its third title in a row and fourth in the last five tournaments.

== Teams ==
- Belgium
- West Germany
- France
- Greece
- Hungary
- Israel
- Italy
- Romania
- Soviet Union
- Spain
- Turkey
- Yugoslavia

== Preliminary round ==
The twelve teams were allocated in two groups of six teams each.

Team advanced to Semifinals
Team competed in 5th–8th playoffs
Team competed in 9th–12th playoffs

=== Group A ===
Team	Pld	W	L	PF	PA	Pts
Yugoslavia	5	5	0	402	318	10
Italy	5	4	1	418	373	9
Greece	5	3	2	367	347	8
France	5	2	3	332	390	7
Israel	5	1	4	388	399	6
Turkey	5	0	5	349	429	5

=== Group B ===
Team	Pld	W	L	PF	PA	Pts
Soviet Union	5	5	0	429	316	10
Spain	5	4	1	365	350	9
Romania	5	3	2	356	342	8
West Germany	5	2	3	335	374	7
Belgium	5	1	4	327	369	6
Hungary	5	0	5	301	362	5

== Knockout stage ==
=== 9th–12th playoffs ===
Playoffs
Hungary	91
Israel	106
Belgium	79
Turkey	93

Ninth place
Israel	96
Turkey	78
Eleventh place
Hungary	58
Belgium	82

=== 5th–8th playoffs ===
Playoffs
West Germany	65
Greece	63
France	78
Romania	73

Fifth place
West Germany	57
France	67
Seventh place
Greece	79
Romania	75

=== Championship ===
Semifinals
Yugoslavia	94
Spain	67
Italy	104
Soviet Union	90

Final
Yugoslavia	83
Italy	77
Third place
Spain	76
Soviet Union	84

== Final standings ==
Rank	Team
Gold medal	Yugoslavia
Silver medal	Italy
Bronze medal	Soviet Union
4th	Spain
5th	France
6th	West Germany
7th	Greece
8th	Romania
9th	Israel
10th	Turkey
11th	Belgium
12th	Hungary

1987 FIBA Europe U-16 Championship

Yugoslavia
Fifth title

Team roster

Živko Badžim, Oliver Popović, Rastko Cvetković, Žan Tabak, Ante Perica, Nenad Grmuša, Boris Orcev, Marijan Kraljević, Obrad Ignjatović, Arijan Komazec, Mirko Pavlović, and Bojan Popović. Head coach: Janez Drvarič.
