= Rastko Cvetković =

Serbian basketball player

Rastko Cvetković Растко Цветковић
Personal information
- Born: June 22, 1970 (age 56) Belgrade, SFR Yugoslavia
- Listed height: 2.12 m (6 ft 11 in)
- Listed weight: 118 kg (260 lb)

Career information
- NBA draft: 1992: undrafted
- Playing career: 1988–2002
- Position: Center
- Number: 8, 10, 13

Career history
- 1988–1993: Crvena zvezda
- 1993–1994: AEK Athens
- 1994–1995: Crvena zvezda
- 1995–1996: Denver Nuggets
- 1998–1999: Crvena zvezda
- 1999–2000: Soproni
- 2000–2001: Espoon Honka
- 2001: Belenenses
- 2001–2002: Seixal

Career highlights
- YUBA League champion (1993); Finnish Cup winner (2001)
- Stats at NBA.com
- Stats at Basketball Reference

Rastko Cvetković (Serbian Cyrillic: Растко Цветковић; born 22 June 1970) is a Serbian former professional basketball player. Standing at 7 ft 1 in (2.16 m), he played as a center. He is a son of the famous Serbian basketball player Vladimir Cvetković.

== Playing career ==
A center, Cvetković played professionally 14 seasons, from 1988 to 2002. During his playing days, he played for Crvena zvezda, AEK Athens, Denver Nuggets, Soproni, Espoon Honka, Belenenses, and Seixal. In 1993, he won a YUBA League championship with Crvena zvezda. In the 1995–96 NBA season, Cvetković played for the Denver Nuggets, recording 0.7 points and 0.8 rebounds per game. He retired as a player with Seixal in 2002.

== National team career ==
In August 1987, Cvetković was a member of the Yugoslavian Cadets that won the gold medal at the European Championship for Cadets in Hungary. Over five tournament games, he averaged 4.8 points per game. In August 1988, Cvetković was a member of the Yugoslavia junior team that won the gold medal at the European Championship for Juniors in Yugoslavia. Over five tournament games, he averaged 3.2 points per game.

== NBA career statistics ==
Legend
GP	Games played	GS	Games started	MPG	Minutes per game
FG%	Field goal percentage	3P%	3-point field goal percentage	FT%	Free throw percentage
RPG	Rebounds per game	APG	Assists per game	SPG	Steals per game
BPG	Blocks per game	PPG	Points per game	**Bold**	Career high

=== Regular season ===
Year	Team	GP	GS	MPG	FG%	3P%	FT%	RPG	APG	SPG	BPG	PPG
1995–96	Denver	14	0	3.4	.313	.000	.000	.8	.2	.1	.1	.7

== See also ==
- List of father-and-son combinations who have played for Crvena zvezda
- List of KK Crvena zvezda players with 100 games played
- List of Serbian NBA players
