= 1989 FIBA Europe Under-16 Championship =

1989 EuroBasket Under-16
10th FIBA Europe Under-16 Championship

Tournament details
- Host country: Spain
- Dates: 19–26 August 1989
- Teams: 12
- Venue(s): (in 3 host cities)

Final positions
- Champions: Greece (1st title)

The 1989 FIBA Europe Under-16 Championship (known at that time as 1989 European Championship for Cadets) was the 10th edition of the FIBA Europe Under-16 Championship. The cities of Guadalajara, Tarancón and Cuenca, in Spain, hosted the tournament. Greece won the trophy for the first time.

== Teams ==
- Belgium
- Bulgaria
- West Germany
- France
- Greece
- Israel
- Italy
- Poland
- Soviet Union
- Spain
- Turkey
- Yugoslavia

== Preliminary round ==
The twelve teams were allocated in two groups of six teams each.

Team advanced to Semifinals
Team competed in 5th–8th playoffs
Team competed in 9th–12th playoffs

=== Group A ===
Team	Pld	W	L	PF	PA	Pts
Greece	5	5	0	425	380	10
Yugoslavia	5	4	1	417	343	9
Spain	5	3	2	409	349	8
France	5	2	3	366	364	7
Belgium	5	1	4	348	422	6
Bulgaria	5	0	5	344	451	5

=== Group B ===
Team	Pld	W	L	PF	PA	Pts
Italy	5	5	0	441	344	10
Turkey	5	3	2	379	354	8
Soviet Union	5	3	2	413	369	8
Israel	5	2	3	382	385	7
Poland	5	1	4	335	429	6
West Germany	5	1	4	310	379	6

== Knockout stage ==
=== 9th–12th playoffs ===
Playoffs
Belgium	71
West Germany	81
Poland	76
Bulgaria	99

Ninth place
West Germany	101
Bulgaria	80
Eleventh place
Belgium	63
Poland	84

=== 5th–8th playoffs ===
Playoffs
Soviet Union	89
France	73
Spain	95
Israel	80

Fifth place
Soviet Union	90
Spain	84
Seventh place
France	91
Israel	95

=== Championship ===
Semifinals
Greece	64
Turkey	61
Yugoslavia	82
Italy	69

Final
Greece	81
Yugoslavia	79
Third place
Turkey	59
Italy	63

1989 FIBA Europe U-16 Championship

Greece
First title

== Final standings ==
Rank	Team
Gold medal	Greece
Silver medal	Yugoslavia
Bronze medal	Italy
4th	Turkey
5th	Soviet Union
6th	Spain
7th	Israel
8th	France
9th	West Germany
10th	Bulgaria
11th	Poland
12th	Belgium
