= Ivica Mavrenski =

Serbian basketball player (1966–2024)

Personal information
- Born: 31 March 1966 Zrenjanin, SR Serbia, SFR Yugoslavia
- Died: 2 August 2024 (aged 58)
- Listed height: 1.85 m (6 ft 1 in)

Career information
- NBA draft: 1988: undrafted
- Playing career: 1986–2004
- Position: Point guard
- Number: 15, 5
- Coaching career: 2004–2005

Career history

Playing
- 1986–1992: Vojvodina
- 1992–1993: Profikolor
- 1993–1995: Crvena zvezda
- 1995–1996: FMP
- 1997–1998: Hemofarm
- 1998: MZT Skopje
- 1998–1999: Gračanica
- 1999–2000: Ibon Nikšić
- 2000–2002: ZTE KK

Coaching
- 2004–2005: Vojvodina
- 2008–2009: Vizura
- 2011–2012: Železničar Inđija
- 2019–2020: RKA Pécs
- 2021–2022: NKA Pécs
Medals
Men's basketball
Representing Yugoslavia
European Championship for Juniors
Bronze medal – third place	1984 Sweden	Team
European Championship for Cadets
Gold medal – first place	1983 West Germany	Team

Ivica Mavrenski (Serbian Cyrillic: Ивица Мавренски; 31 March 1966 – 2 August 2024) was a Serbian professional basketball coach and player.

== Playing career ==
A point guard, Mavrenski played for Vojvodina, Profikolor, Crvena zvezda, FMP, Hemofarm, MZT Skopje, Gračanica, Gračanica, Ibon Nikšić, and ZTE KK.

== National team career ==
In July 1983, Mavrenski was a member of the Yugoslavia cadet national team that won a gold medal at the FIBA Europe Championship for Cadets in Tübingen and Ludwigsburg, West Germany. Over seven tournament games, he averaged 18.4 points per game leading a team as the top scorer. In August 1983, Mavrenski was a member of the Yugoslavia Juniors that finished 8th at the FIBA Under-19 World Championship in Palma de Mallorca, Spain. Over six tournament games, he averaged 2.7 points per game.

In August 1984, Mavrenski was a member of the Yugoslavia junior national team that won a bronze medal at the European Championship for Junior Men in Huskvarna and Katrineholm, Sweden. Over seven tournament games, he averaged 7.1 points per game.

== Coaching career ==
After retirement as a player, Mavrenski started coaching career. He coached Vojvodina, Vizura, Železničar Inđija among others.

== Death ==
Mavrenski died on 2 August 2024, at the age of 58.

== Career achievements ==
- Yugoslav League champion: 1 (with Crvena zvezda: 1993–94)
- Yugoslav B League champion: 1 (with Vojvodina: 1987–88)
- YUBA B League champion: 1 (with Hemofarm: 1997–98)
- Yugoslav Super Cup winner: 1 (with Crvena zvezda: 1993)
