= Rusmir Halilović =

Yugoslavian basketball player and coach

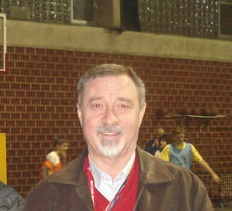
- Halilovic in 2010

Personal information
- Born: 5 January 1948 (age 78) FPR Yugoslavia
- Position: Head coach
- Coaching career: 1971–present

Career history

Coaching
- KK Sarajevo
- Bosna
- Jug Dubrovnik
- 1979–1980: Budućnost
- Oyak Renault
- 1986–1987: Efes Pilsen
- Al Sulaibikhat
- Çukurova
- Al-Arabi
- Triglav Kranj
Medals
Men's basketball
Head Coach for Yugoslavia
European Championship for Juniors
Silver medal – second place	1982 Bulgaria	Junior Team
European Championship for Cadets
Gold medal – first place	1983 West Germany	Cadet Team

Rusmir Halilović (born 5 January 1948) is a Yugoslavian basketball coach.

== Coaching career ==
=== Taking over Yugoslavian NT selections 1981–1985 ===
In 1981, Halilovic lead Budućnost Podgorica from the lower rank to Yugoslavian A1 league. He then began his professional career as coach for Yugoslavian Basketball Federation (KSJ – "Kosarkaski Savez Jugoslavije") in charge of NT cadet and junior selections programs.

Halilovic was also the assistant coach of Mirko Novosel, who was later made a member of Naismith and the FIBA Hall of Fame. Halilovic also took on head coaching duties at three games of Yugoslavian senior NT during its American NCAA tour in 1982. In the initial game, Yugoslavian NT led by Dražen Petrović won the game vs. one of the top ranked NCAA teams of that time.

During 1981, 1982, and 1983 regular American tours Halilovic, along with coaches Tanjevic and Novosel, often met, communicated, and exchanged experiences with the top notch NCAA coaches such as Dean Smith (North Carolina), Joe B. Hall (Kentucky) and Digger Phelps (Notre Dame). He also served as a special press liaison for Yugoslavian NT.

=== Work with Dražen Petrović and future NBA players ===
Halilovic is known for his role in developing Dražen Petrović (coaching him each summer from his 15th to 19th year of life) as well as future NBA players from ex-Yugoslavia and future Euroleague stars.

Players Halilovic coached in Yugoslavian cadet and junior selections include Dražen Petrović, Vlade Divac, Toni Kukoč, Dino Rađa, Žarko Paspalj, Jure Zdovc, Stojko Vranković, Danko Cvjetićanin, Velimir Perasović, Miloš Babić, Franjo Arapović, Miroslav Pecarski, Luka Pavićević, Teoman Alibegović, Dragan Tarlać, Dalibor Bagarić, Bruno Šundov as well as other international players.

=== Role in the formation of European Dream Teams (Yugoslavian, later Croatian and Serbian) ===
Halilovic played a role in identifying and developing players who later formed the Yugoslavian senior NT which won back-to-back European Championships in 1989. and 1991. and World Championship in 1990. under the leadership of the coach Dušan Ivković.

From 1994. until 1996. Halilović worked for Croatian Basketball Federation (HKS – "Hrvatski Košarkaški Savez") as a junior NT coach. During that time he coached future NBA and Euroleague players Bagarić, Šundov, Skelin, Grgat, Prkačin, Rimac, and Mulaomerović.

=== Recent activity ===
After closing up his basketball academy for young players KK RIN Family Sarajevo which launched future international stars and Bosnia and Herzegovina NT members such as Goran Suton, Nihad Dedovic, Sani Čampara along with Turkey NT member and 2014 FIBA EC MVP Cedi Osman. He resides in the capitol of Croatia, Zagreb.

He is still an active consultant for Croatian basketball teams (KK Cedevita Zagreb, KK Cibona Zagreb, KK Zadar, KK Zagreb), particularly involved in the area of developing basketball prospects and searching for players who have the potential to become future leaders.

Recently he has also been active in scouting prospects who compete in the local development CroHoops league (Zagreb, Croatia).
