= Slaviša Koprivica =

Serbian basketball player

Personal information
- Born: 17 June 1968 (age 58) Belgrade, SR Serbia, SFR Yugoslavia
- Listed height: 2.06 m (6 ft 9 in)
- Listed weight: 115 kg (254 lb)

Career information
- NBA draft: 1990: undrafted
- Playing career: 1985–2003, 2007–2008
- Position: Power forward / center
- Number: 13

Career history
- 1985–1987: Partizan
- 1987–1989: OKK Beograd
- 1989–1991: IMT Beograd
- 1991–1993: Partizan
- 1993–1994: Pagrati
- 1994–1995: Brescialat Gorizia
- 1996–1997: Beobanka
- 1997–1998: Partizan
- 1998–1999: Znicz Pruszków
- 2000–2001: Szolnoki Olaj
- 2002: EvrAz
- 2002–2003: Cherno More Varna
- 2007–2008: Superfund

Career highlights
- EuroLeague champion (1992); EuroLeague All-Final Four Team (1992); 2× Yugoslav League champion (1987, 1992); Yugoslav Cup winner (1992); Polish Cup winner (1999)
Medals
Men's basketball
Representing Yugoslavia
Under-19 World Cup
Gold medal – first place	1987 Italy	Under-19
European Championship for Cadets
Gold medal – first place	1985 Bulgaria	Under-16

Slaviša "Slavko" Koprivica (Serbian Cyrillic: Славиша "Славко" Копривица, born 17 June 1968) is a retired Serbian professional basketball player. He played at both the power forward and center positions.

== Professional career ==
While playing with Partizan Belgrade, Koprivica won the EuroLeague championship, in 1992.

== Personal life ==
Koprivica's son Balša (born 2000), played high school basketball in the United States. Balša won the 2017 FIBA Europe Under-18 Championship, and he was considered to be one of the top ten college recruits in the Class of 2019.

Koprivica and Miroslav Pecarski played together on the junior Yugoslav national team, and they won a gold medal at the 1987 FIBA Under-19 World Cup. Thirty years later, their sons Balša Koprivica and Marko Pecarski, played together for Serbia's junior national team; and they won a gold medal at the 2017 FIBA Europe Under-18 Championship.
