= Svetislav Pešić =

Serbian basketball player and coach (born 1949)

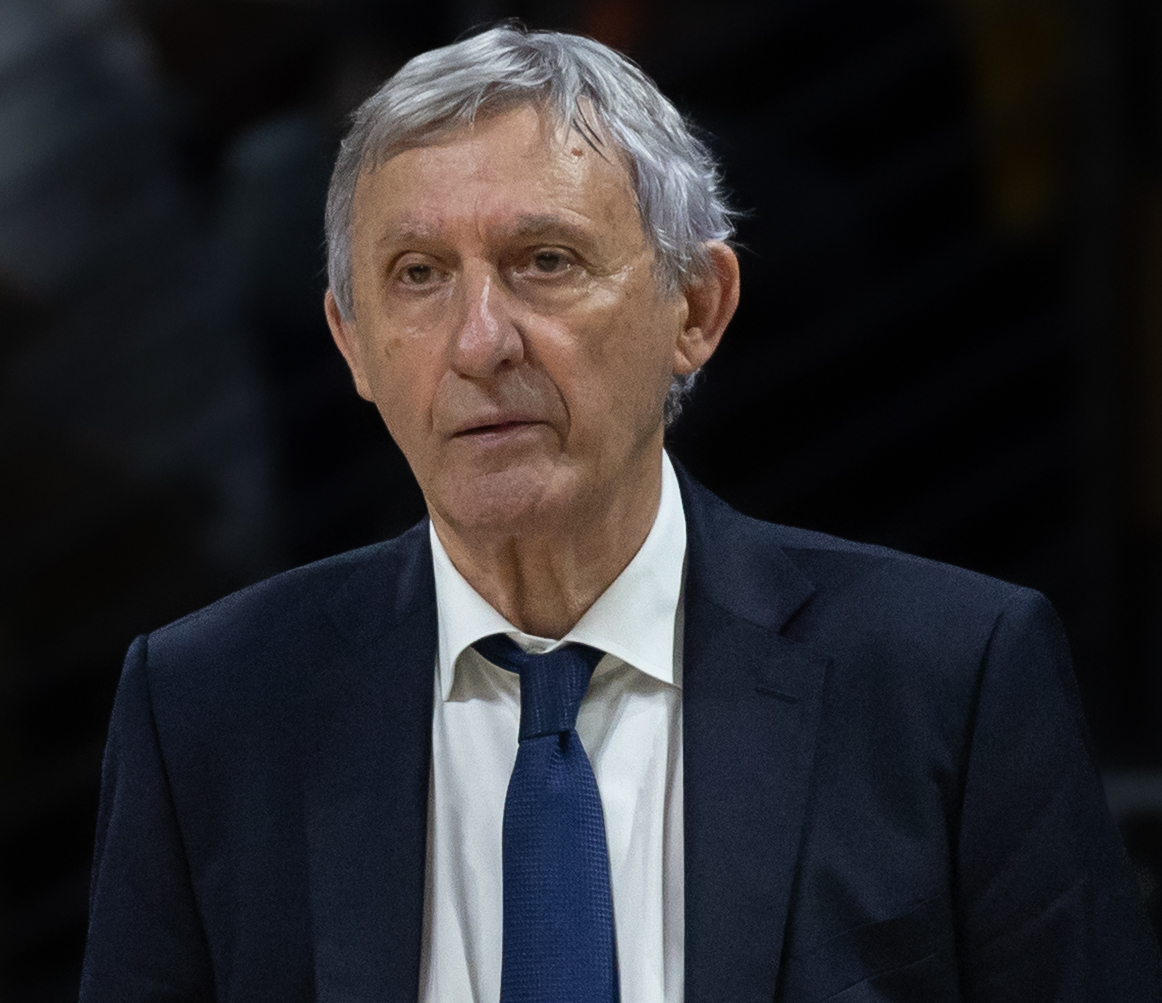
- Pešić in 2026

Personal information
- Born: 28 August 1949 (age 77) Pirot, PR Serbia, FPR Yugoslavia
- Listed height: 1.85 m (6 ft 1 in)
- Listed weight: 83 kg (183 lb)

Career information
- NBA draft: 1971: undrafted
- Playing career: 1964–1979
- Position: Shooting guard
- Number: 15
- Coaching career: 1982–2026

Career history

Playing
- 1964–1967: Pirot
- 1967–1971: Partizan
- 1971–1979: Bosna

Coaching
- 1982–1987: Bosna
- 1987–1993: Germany
- 1993–2000: Alba Berlin
- 2001–2002: FR Yugoslavia
- 2001–2002: RheinEnergie Köln
- 2002–2004: FC Barcelona
- 2004–2006: Virtus Roma
- 2006–2007: Girona
- 2007–2008: Dynamo Moscow
- 2008–2009: Crvena zvezda
- 2010–2011: Valencia
- 2011–2012: Crvena zvezda
- 2012: Germany
- 2012–2016: Bayern Munich
- 2018–2020: FC Barcelona
- 2021–2025: Serbia
- 2025–2026: Bayern Munich

Career highlights
- As player: EuroLeague champion (1979); Yugoslav League champion (1978); Yugoslav Cup winner (1978); As a head coach: EuroLeague champion (2003); FIBA Korać Cup champion (1995); FIBA EuroCup champion (2007); Yugoslav League champion (1983); 5× Bundesliga champion (1997–2000, 2014); 2× Liga ACB champion (2003, 2004); Yugoslav Cup winner (1984); 2× German Cup winner (1997, 1999); 3× Spanish Cup winner (2003, 2018, 2019); FIBA Hall of Fame (2020); European Coach of the Year (2003); FIBA EuroStar (1998); 3× Bundesliga Coach of the Year (1996, 1998, 1999); Spanish AEEB Coach of the Year (2019); Piva Ivković Award for Lifetime Achievement (2001)
- FIBA Hall of Fame
Medals
Men's basketball
Head Coach for Serbia
Summer Olympic Games
Bronze medal – third place	2024 Paris
FIBA World Cup
Silver medal – second place	2023 Philippines–Japan–Indonesia
Head Coach for FR Yugoslavia
FIBA World Cup
Gold medal – first place	2002 United States
FIBA EuroBasket
Gold medal – first place	2001 Turkey
Head Coach for Germany
FIBA EuroBasket
Gold medal – first place	1993 Germany
Head Coach for Yugoslavia
Under-19 World Cup
Gold medal – first place	1987 Italy	Under-19
European Championship for Juniors
Gold medal – first place	1986 Austria	Under-18
European Championship for Cadets
Gold medal – first place	1985 Bulgaria	Under-16

Svetislav "Kari" Pešić (Serbian Cyrillic: Светислав "Кари" Пешић; born 28 August 1949) is a Serbian former basketball player and coach.

== Playing career ==
During his club playing career, Pešić played with Pirot (1964–1967), Partizan (1967–1971), and Bosna (1971–1979). As a member of Bosna, he won a Yugoslav Cup and a Yugoslav League championship, in 1978. Also, he won the FIBA European Champions Cup (EuroLeague) championship in 1979 with Bosna.

== Coaching career ==
=== Club coaching career ===
On the club level, Pešić won the triple crown in 2003, while he was the head coach of FC Barcelona. On 16 November 2010, he was named the head coach of Power Electronics Valencia, for the rest of the 2010–11 season. In November 2012, Pešić was named the head coach of the German team Bayern Munich. On 28 February 2015, he extended his contract with the club until 2017. On 24 July 2016, he left Bayern at his own request, for health reasons.

On 9 February 2018, he returned to FC Barcelona as the team's head coach, until the end of the season.

On 22 December 2025, he took over Bayern Munich once again, after the departure of previous head coach Gordon Herbert.

=== National team coaching career ===
Pešić led the Yugoslavian junior national team, that featured future international stars Vlade Divac, Saša Đorđević, Toni Kukoč, and Dino Rađa, to a gold medal at the 1987 FIBA World Junior Championship (which was later split into separate under-19 and under-21 events), by defeating the Team USA twice during the tournament. With the FR Yugoslavian senior side, Pešić won gold medals at the 2002 FIBA World Championship, which was held in Indianapolis, and the EuroBasket 2001 (organized by Turkey). He stepped down from the position on 1 December 2002.

On 28 September 2021, Basketball Federation of Serbia appointed Pešić as new head coach for the Serbia men's national team. He led Serbia to win the silver medal at the 2023 FIBA Basketball World Cup and bronze at the 2024 Summer Olympics. On 30 September 2025, his contract as national team coach expired and he stepped down from the position, following Serbia's defeat against Finland at the EuroBasket 2025.

== Coaching record ==
Legend
G	Games coached	W	Games won	L	Games lost	W–L %	Win-loss %

Note: The EuroLeague is not the only competition in which the team played during the season. He also coached in domestic competition, and regional competition if applicable.

=== EuroLeague ===
Team	Year	G	W	L	W–L%	Result
Barcelona
Barcelona	2002–03	21	17	4	.810	Won EuroLeague Championship
Barcelona	2003–04	20	14	6	.700	Eliminated at Top 16 Stage
Valencia	2010–11	20	11	9	.550	Eliminated in quarterfinals
Bayern	2013–14	24	9	15	.375	Eliminated at Top 16 stage
Bayern	2014–15	10	2	8	.200	Eliminated at the group stage
Bayern	2015–16	10	4	6	.400	Eliminated at the group stage
Barcelona	2017–18	8	4	4	.500	Eliminated in regular season
Barcelona	2018–19	35	20	15	.571	Eliminated in quarterfinals
Barcelona	2019–20	28	22	6	.786	Season cancelled
Career		176	103	73	.585	

== Personal life ==
Along with Serbian, Pešić also holds German citizenship. His son, Marko (born 1976), is a former professional basketball player, who represented the Germany national team in four major tournaments. Former German basketball player Jan Jagla, is his son-in-law, due to his marriage with Pešić's daughter, Ivana.

== See also ==
- List of EuroLeague-winning head coaches
- List of FIBA EuroBasket winning head coaches
- FIBA Basketball World Cup winning head coaches
