= 2013 FIBA Europe Under-16 Championship =

2013 EuroBasket Under-16
27th FIBA Europe Under-16 Championship

Tournament details
- Host country: Ukraine
- Dates: 8 – 18 August 2013
- Teams: 16
- Venue(s): 2 (in 1 host city)

Final positions
- Champions: Spain (3rd title)

Tournament statistics
- MVP: (Serbia) Stefan Peno
- Top scorer: (Turkey) Korkmaz (25.3)
- Top rebounds: (Croatia) Zizic (12.8)
- Top assists: (Ukraine) Zotov (4.9)
- PPG (Team): Lithuania (77.0)
- RPG (Team): Croatia (53.9)
- APG (Team): Croatia (17.8)

Official website
- www.fibaeurope.com

The 2013 FIBA Europe Under-16 Championship was the 27th edition of the European Under-16 Basketball Championship. 16 teams participated in the competition, which was held in Kyiv, Ukraine, from 8 to 18 August 2013. Turkey were the defending champions.

== Participating teams ==
- Belgium ▲ (Winners, 2012 FIBA Europe Under-16 Championship Division B)
- Croatia
- Spain
- France
- Germany
- Greece
- Italy
- Latvia
- Lithuania
- Montenegro ▲ (Runners-up, 2012 FIBA Europe Under-16 Championship Division B)
- Poland
- Russia
- Serbia
- Sweden ▲ (3rd place, 2012 FIBA Europe Under-16 Championship Division B)
- Turkey
- Ukraine

== First round ==
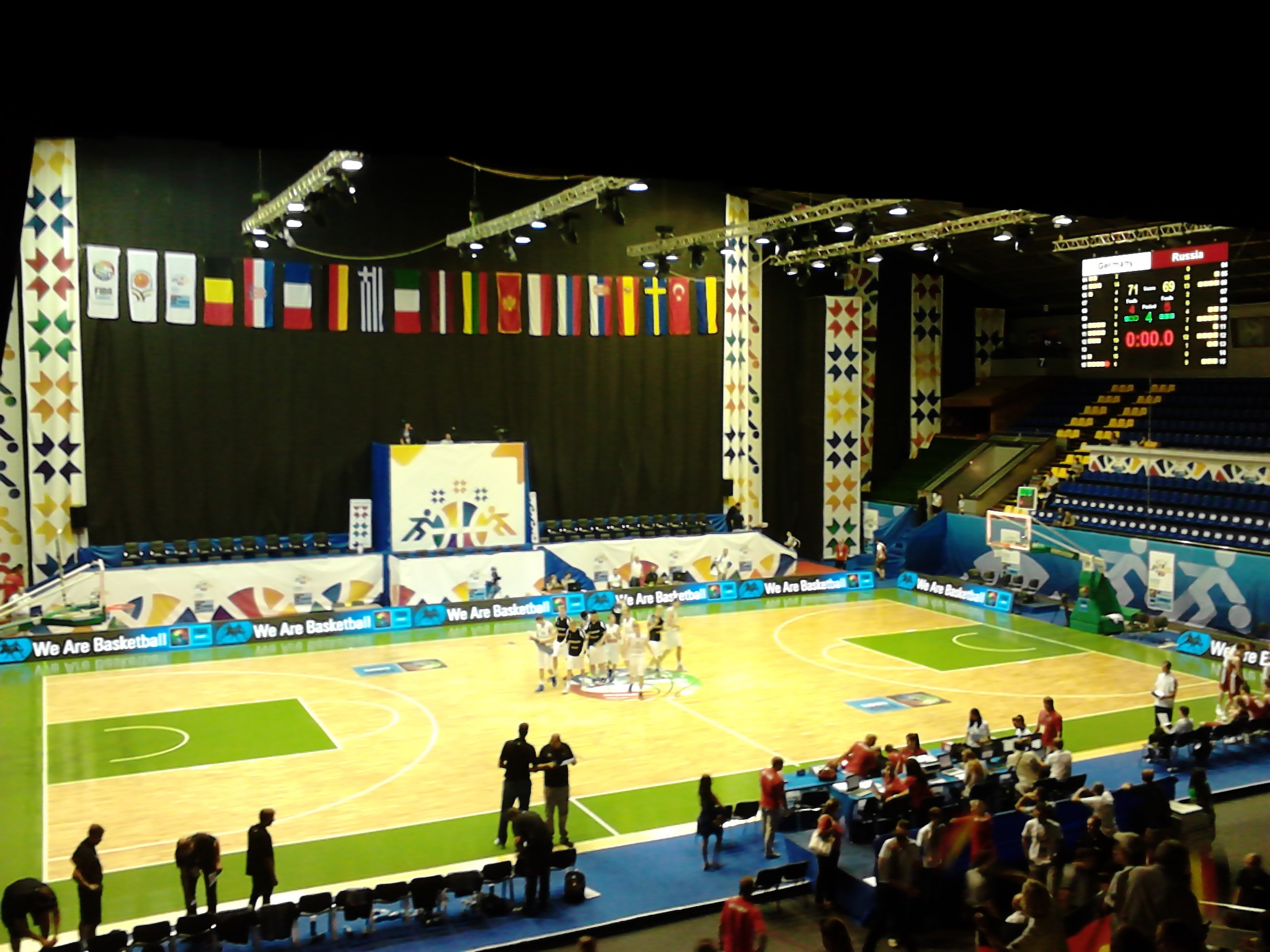
Germany–Russia match in the second round of Eurobasket U16 2013

The first-round groups draw took place on 8 December 2012 in Freising, Germany. In this round, sixteen teams are allocated in four groups of four teams each. The top three teams of each group will advance to the Qualifying Round. The last teams will play in the Classification Group G first, then in the 9th–16th place playoffs.

Team advances to the Second Round
Team will compete in Classification Group G

=== Group A ===
Team	Pld	W	L	PF	PA	PD	Pts
Greece	3	3	0	188	155	+33	6
Spain	3	2	1	210	178	+32	5
Russia	3	1	2	188	219	−31	4
Belgium	3	0	3	177	211	−34	3

8 August 2013
14:15

Report

Russia	60–87	Spain
Scoring by quarter: 13–22, 9–29, 27–16, 11–20
Pts: Yakushin 15; Rebs: Karpenkov 8 Asts: Yakushin 4		Pts: Lopez-Arostegui 19; Rebs: Sorolla 8 Asts: Lopez-Arostegui 4

Palace of Sports, Kyiv
Referees: Aleksandar Glisić (SRB), Clemens Fritz (GER), Irakli Berishvili (GEO)

8 August 2013
21:30

Report

Belgium	52–63	Greece
Scoring by quarter: 11–14, 17–22, 8–13, 16–14
Pts: Akyazili 21; Rebs: Casero 5 Asts: Akyazili, Madoki 3		Pts: Papagiannis 16; Rebs: Papagiannis 11; Asts: Skoulidas 5

Palace of Sports, Kyiv
Referees: Milos Koljensić (MNE), Ciprian Stoica (ROU), Saulius Racys (SWE)

9 August 2013
16:30

Report

Greece	68–60	Russia
Scoring by quarter: 17–9, 17–17, 11–17, 23–17
Pts: Flionis 16; Rebs: Papagiannis 13; Asts: Skoulidas 5		Pts: Yakushin 19; Rebs: Karpenkov 10; Asts: Sopin 3

Palace of Sports, Kyiv
Referees: Regis Bardera (FRA), Matej Spendl (SLO), Ventsislav Velikov (BUL)

9 August 2013
18:45

Report

Spain	80–61	Belgium
Scoring by quarter: 18–20, 15–15, 23–7, 24–19
Pts: Vilà 17; Rebs: Rodriguez, Vilà 8 Asts: Lopez-Arosteguj, Yusta 4		Pts: Akyazili 22; Rebs: Vervoort 6 Asts: 4 players with 2

Palace of Sports, Kyiv
Referees: Janusz Calik (POL), Mindaugas Vecerskis (LTU), Yener Yilmaz (TUR)

10 August 2013
14:15

Report

Belgium	64–68	Russia
Scoring by quarter: 14–19, 11–9, 21–12, 18–28
Pts: Akyazili 21; Rebs: Akyazili 7 Asts: Akyazili, Riahi 4		Pts: Karpenkov 21; Rebs: Karpenkov 13; Asts: Yakushin 5

Palace of Sports, Kyiv
Referees: Milos Koljensic (MNE), Yener Yilmaz (TUR), Ciprian Stoica (ROU)

10 August 2013
14:15

Report

Spain	43–57	Greece
Scoring by quarter: 14–8, 5–16, 10–14, 14–19
Pts: Yusta 17; Rebs: Vilà 9 Asts: Lopez-Arostegui 4		Pts: Charalampopoulos 14; Rebs: Charalampopoulos, Papagiannis 12; Asts: Charalampopoulos, Flionis 3

Palace of Sports, Kyiv
Referees: Aleksandar Glisic (SRB), Clemens Fritz (GER), Christoph Rohacky (AUT)

=== Group B ===
Team	Pld	W	L	PF	PA	PD	Pts
Turkey	3	3	0	211	166	+45	6
Germany	3	2	1	192	180	+12	5
Lithuania	3	1	2	215	217	−2	4
Sweden	3	0	3	158	213	−55	3

8 August 2013
14:15

Report

Germany	55–62	Turkey
Scoring by quarter: 14–16, 9–16, 19–15, 13–15
Pts: Kiel 12; Rebs: Kiel 19; Asts: Merz, Taras 3		Pts: Korkmaz 17; Rebs: Bayrak 8 Asts: Korkmaz, Havsa 3

Palace of Sports, Kyiv
Referees: Oskars Lucis (LAT), Tomislav Hordov (CRO), Sergei Beliakov (RUS)

8 August 2013
18:45

Report

Sweden	64–80	Lithuania
Scoring by quarter: 12–13, 17–18, 17–25, 18–24
Pts: Lecesne 18; Rebs: Lecesne 7 Asts: Berkelund, Bodin 3		Pts: Varnas 19; Rebs: Stoma 6 Asts: Varnas 4

Palace of Sports, Kyiv
Referees: Mathieu Bayot (BEL), Nikolaos Somos (GRE), Navitalai Naivalu (FIJ)

9 August 2013
14:15

Report

Lithuania	68–71	Germany
Scoring by quarter: 19–17, 20–21, 13–22, 16–11
Pts: Varnas 24; Rebs: Stakeliunas 9 Asts: Svambaris 4		Pts: Kiel 13; Rebs: Kiel 15; Asts: Beyschlag 4

Palace of Sports, Kyiv
Referees: Benjamin Jimenez Trujillo (ESP), Roman Ponomarenko (UKR), Manuel Mazzoni (ITA)

9 August 2013
21:00

Report

Turkey	67–44	Sweden
Scoring by quarter: 17–13, 22–15, 21–10, 7–6
Pts: Korkmaz 25; Rebs: Arna 9 Asts: Durmaz 3		Pts: Lecesne 17; Rebs: Sjöberg 13; Asts: Ericsson 3

Palace of Sports, Kyiv
Referees: Sérgio Silva (POR), Gentian Cici (ALB), Christoph Rohacky (AUT)

10 August 2013
16:30

Report

Sweden	50–66	Germany
Scoring by quarter: 10–9, 9–26, 16–18, 15–13
Pts: Berkelund 17; Rebs: Bodin 9 Asts: Sjölin 5		Pts: Taras 10; Rebs: Hübner, Taras 7 Asts: Merz 3

Palace of Sports, Kyiv
Referees: Tomislav Hordov (CRO), Nikolaos Somos (GRE), Sergei Beliakov (RUS)

10 August 2013
18:45

Report

Turkey	82–67	Lithuania
Scoring by quarter: 19–24, 18–10, 20–21, 25–12
Pts: Korkmaz 29; Rebs: Arna 11; Asts: Ülker 4		Pts: Dieninis 20; Rebs: Varnas 7 Asts: Beliauskas 5

Palace of Sports, Kyiv
Referees: Oskars Lucis (LAT), Mathieu Bayot (BEL), Irakli Berishvili (GEO)

=== Group C ===
Team	Pld	W	L	PF	PA	PD	Pts
Serbia	3	3	0	191	165	+26	6
France	3	2	1	216	190	+26	5
Montenegro	3	1	2	183	192	−9	4
Poland	3	0	3	150	193	−43	3

8 August 2013
16:30

Report

Montenegro	54–43	Poland
Scoring by quarter: 10–10, 12–15, 12–11, 20–7
Pts: Bakić, Radonjić 10; Rebs: 3 players tied with 6 Asts: Vukčević 4		Pts: Majchrzak 9 Rebs: 3 players tied with 8 Asts: Rerak 3

Palace of Sports, Kyiv
Referees: Sérgio Silva (POR), Roman Ponomarenko (UKR), Christoph Rohacky (AUT)

8 August 2013
18:45

Report

Serbia	60–59	France
Scoring by quarter: 12–9, 15–10, 24–21, 9–19
Pts: Peno 16; Rebs: Glišić 8 Asts: Peno 8		Pts: Gombauld 21; Rebs: Gombauld 11; Asts: Leboeuf 5

Palace of Sports, Kyiv
Referees: Benjamin Jimenez Trujillo (ESP), Gentian Cici (ALB), Manuel Mazzoni (ITA)

9 August 2013
14:15

Report

France	80–71	Montenegro
Scoring by quarter: 23–21, 26–10, 14–21, 17–19
Pts: Gombauld 18; Rebs: Gombauld 14; Asts: Ona Embo 3		Pts: Čarapić, Radonjić 12; Rebs: Popović 9 Asts: Čarapić 5

Palace of Sports, Kyiv
Referees: Tomislav Hordov (CRO), Nikolaos Somos (GRE), Sergei Beliakov (RUS)

9 August 2013
16:30

Report

Poland	48–62	Serbia
Scoring by quarter: 8–19, 13–15, 17–14, 10–14
Pts: Ponitka 12; Rebs: Bender 5 Asts: Scibisz, Ponitka 2		Pts: Stojanović 11; Rebs: Stojanović, Kenić 9 Asts: Jovanović 3

Palace of Sports, Kyiv
Referees: Mathieu Bayot (BEL), Oskars Lucis (LAT), Irakli Berishvili (GEO)

10 August 2013
18:45

Report

Montenegro	58–69	Serbia
Scoring by quarter: 16–17, 12–16, 13–16, 17–20
Pts: Čarapić 17; Rebs: Lucic, Popović 5 Asts: Lucic 4		Pts: Glišić 26; Rebs: Glišić 13; Asts: Peno 8

Palace of Sports, Kyiv
Referees: Benjamin Jimenez Trujillo (ESP), Gentian Cici (ALB), Manuel Mazzoni (ITA)

10 August 2013
21:00

Report

France	77–59	Poland
Scoring by quarter: 29–13, 18–14, 18–20, 12–12
Pts: Ona Embo 19; Rebs: Gombauld 7 Asts: Loubaki 4		Pts: Sewioł 13; Rebs: Sewioł 7 Asts: Ponitka 3

Palace of Sports, Kyiv
Referees: Sérgio Silva (POR), Roman Ponomarenko (UKR), Navitalai Naivalu (FIJ)

=== Group D ===
Team	Pld	W	L	PF	PA	PD	Pts
Croatia	3	3	0	236	186	+50	6
Italy	3	1	2	195	208	−13	4
Ukraine	3	1	2	206	217	−11	4
Latvia	3	1	2	172	198	−26	4

8 August 2013
16:30

Report

Italy	64–91	Croatia
Scoring by quarter: 18–29, 16–23, 4–16, 26–23
Pts: La Torre 21; Rebs: La Torre, Pecchia 5 Asts: Savoldelli 2		Pts: Slavica 22; Rebs: Zizic, 14; Asts: Bender, Mazalin 5

Palace of Sports, Kyiv
Referees: Janusz Calik (POL), Mindaugas Vecerskis (LTU), Ventsislav Velikov (BUL)

8 August 2013
21:30

Report

Ukraine	78–61	Latvia
Scoring by quarter: 21–14, 26–11, 13–15, 18–21
Pts: Mykhailiuk, 26; Rebs: Mykhailiuk, Berozkin 11; Asts: Zotov, 6		Pts: Strautiņš, 14; Rebs: 3 players tied with 7 Asts: Krumins, Birkans 2

Palace of Sports, Kyiv
Referees: Regis Bardera (FRA), Matej Spendl (SLO), Yener Yilmaz (TUR)

9 August 2013
18:45

Report

Latvia	56–54	Italy
Scoring by quarter: 10–18, 19–15, 12–5, 15–16
Pts: Strautiņš, 13; Rebs: Strautiņš, 11; Asts: 3 players tied with 2		Pts: Savoldelli, 14; Rebs: Bucarelli, Guariglia 8 Asts: Moretti, 3

Palace of Sports, Kyiv
Referees: Aleksandar Glisic (SRB), Milos Koljensic (MNE), Navitalai Naivalu (FIJ)

9 August 2013
21:00

Report

Croatia	79–67	Ukraine
Scoring by quarter: 27–24, 14–14, 20–17, 18–12
Pts: Slavica 26; Rebs: Zizic 15; Asts: Mazalin 7		Pts: Mykhailiuk 33; Rebs: Mykhailiuk, Pavlov 9 Asts: Zotov 5

Palace of Sports, Kyiv
Referees: Clemens Fritz (GER), Ciprian Stoica (ROU), Saulius Racys (SWE)

10 August 2013
16:30

Report

Croatia	66–55	Latvia
Scoring by quarter: 17–18, 16–9, 13–14, 20–14
Pts: Slavica, Mazalin 19; Rebs: Zubac, Zizic 10; Asts: Lazic, Zubac 3		Pts: Kohs 10; Rebs: Saulitis 7 Asts: 3 players tied with 2

Palace of Sports, Kyiv
Referees: Mindaugas Vecerskis (LTU), Regis Bardera (FRA), Ventsislav Velikov (BUL)

10 August 2013
21:00

Report

Ukraine	61–77	Italy
Scoring by quarter: 9–19, 16–21, 20–20, 16–17
Pts: Mykhailiuk 21; Rebs: Berozkin 7 Asts: Mykhailiuk 3		Pts: Moretti 24; Rebs: La Torre, Cattapan 9 Asts: Costa, La Torre 5

Palace of Sports, Kyiv
Referees: Janusz Calik (POL), Matej Spendl (SLO), Saulius Racys (SWE)

== Second round ==
Twelve advancing teams from the First Round were allocated in two groups of six teams each. The top four teams of each group will advance to the quarterfinals. The last two teams of each group will play for the 9th–16th place against the teams from the Group G.

Team advances to Quarterfinals
Team will compete in 9th – 16th Place Playoff

=== Group E ===
Team	Pld	W	L	PF	PA	PD	Pts
Greece	5	5	0	314	259	+55	10
Turkey	5	3	2	329	302	+27	8
Germany	5	3	2	321	337	−16	8
Spain	5	3	2	365	349	+16	8
Lithuania	5	1	4	364	384	−20	6
Russia	5	0	5	314	376	−62	5

12 August 2013
16:30

Report

Germany	77–70	Spain
Scoring by quarter: 17–19, 24–14, 21–20, 15–17
Pts: Kratzer 22; Rebs: Kratzer 20; Asts: Kiel 2		Pts: Yusta 27; Rebs: Rodriguez 8 Asts: Garcia, Rodriguez 3

Palace of Sports, Kyiv
Referees: Aleksandar Glisic (SRB), Mathieu Bayot (BEL), Irakli Berishvili (GEO)

12 August 2013
16:30

Report

Lithuania	65–68 (OT)	Greece
Scoring by quarter: 14–23, 17–12, 21–12, 8–13, Overtime: 5–8
Pts: Varnas 16; Rebs: Andruskevicius 9 Asts: Beliauskas, Dieninis 3		Pts: Papagiannis 19; Rebs: 3 players tied with 10; Asts: Koniaris 4

Palace of Sports, Kyiv
Referees: Milos Koljensic (MNE), Janusz Calik (POL), Matej Spendl (SLO)

12 August 2013
21:00

Report

Russia	57–76	Turkey
Scoring by quarter: 12–19, 15–5, 11–29, 19–23
Pts: Karpenkov, Yakushin 11; Rebs: Bykov 6 Asts: Dobrynin 6		Pts: Korkmaz 22; Rebs: Arna 7 Asts: Korkmaz 5

Palace of Sports, Kyiv
Referees: Tomislav Hordov (CRO), Regis Bardera (FRA), Saulius Racys (SWE)

13 August 2013
16:30

Report

Lithuania	74–68	Russia
Scoring by quarter: 15–10, 18–15, 23–22, 18–21
Pts: Varnas 19; Rebs: Echodas 7 Asts: Varnas 5		Pts: Yakushin 16; Rebs: Karpenkov 10; Asts: Dobrynin 4

Palace of Sports, Kyiv
Referees: Aleksandar Glisic (SRB), Roman Ponomarenko (UKR), Navitalai Naivalu (FIJ)

13 August 2013
16:30

Report

Greece	68–47	Germany
Scoring by quarter: 19–14, 19–10, 14–13, 16–10
Pts: Charalampopoulos 16; Rebs: Papagiannis, Skoulidas 7 Asts: Mouratos 8		Pts: Keßen 14; Rebs: 3 players tied with 5 Asts: Figge 3

Palace of Sports, Kyiv
Referees: Tomislav Hordov (CRO), Gentian Cici (ALB), Christoph Rohacky (AUT)

13 August 2013
18:45

Report

Spain	70–65	Turkey
Scoring by quarter: 15–11, 21–13, 22–22, 12–19
Pts: Yusta 13; Rebs: Rodriguez 12; Asts: Perez 7		Pts: Korkmaz 31; Rebs: Korkmaz 10; Asts: 3 players tied with 3

Palace of Sports, Kyiv
Referees: Milos Koljensic (MNE), Manuel Mazzoni (ITA), Matej Spendl (SLO)

14 August 2013
16:30

Report

Germany	71–69	Russia
Scoring by quarter: 14–18, 17–12, 18–23, 22–16
Pts: Kratzer 19; Rebs: Kratzer 14; Asts: Merz 5		Pts: Starodubov 15; Rebs: Starodubov, Sapianov 5 Asts: Dobrynin, Yakushin 5

Palace of Sports, Kyiv
Referees: Milos Koljensic (MNE), Manuel Mazzoni (ITA), Ventsislav Velikov (BUL)

14 August 2013
18:45

Report

Turkey	44–53	Greece
Scoring by quarter: 15–11, 5–13, 9–12, 15–17
Pts: Taskiran 16; Rebs: Arna 7 Asts: Havsa 4		Pts: Papagiannis 16; Rebs: Papagiannis 9 Asts: Charalampopoulos 3

Palace of Sports, Kyiv
Referees: Aleksandar Glisic (SRB), Roman Ponomarenko (UKR), Janusz Calik (POL)

14 August 2013
21:00

Report

Spain	95–90	Lithuania
Scoring by quarter: 26–22, 29–16, 21–18, 19–34
Pts: Lopez-Arosteguj 19; Rebs: Lopez-Arostegui, Sorolla 8 Asts: Rodriguez 4		Pts: Echodas 23; Rebs: Varnas 12; Asts: Varnas 7

Palace of Sports, Kyiv
Referees: Tomislav Hordov (CRO), Regis Bardera (FRA), Saulius Racys (SWE)

=== Group F ===
Team	Pld	W	L	PF	PA	PD	Pts
Croatia	5	5	0	417	311	+106	10
Serbia	5	4	1	353	292	+61	9
Italy	5	3	2	339	354	−15	8
France	5	2	3	329	331	−2	7
Ukraine	5	1	4	326	384	−58	6
Montenegro	5	0	5	325	417	−92	5

12 August 2013
18:45

Report

Italy	63–60	France
Scoring by quarter: 9–14, 16–15, 15–12, 23–19
Pts: Moretti 17; Rebs: Cattapan 12; Asts: Moretti 4		Pts: Loubaki 14; Rebs: Noua 17; Asts: 4 players tied with 2

Palace of Sports, Kyiv
Referees: Oskars Lucis (LAT), Mindaugas Vecerskis (LTU), Christoph Rohacky (AUT)

12 August 2013
18:45

Report

Ukraine	50–85	Serbia
Scoring by quarter: 13–19, 9–24, 14–23, 14–19
Pts: Mykhailiuk 16; Rebs: Lunskyi 5 Asts: Zotov 4		Pts: 4 players tied with 12; Rebs: Glišić 10; Asts: Jovanovic 5

Palace of Sports, Kyiv
Referees: Sérgio Silva (POR), Yener Yilmaz (TUR), Ventsislav Velikov (BUL)

12 August 2013
21:00

Report

Montenegro	48–100	Croatia
Scoring by quarter: 12–23, 14–26, 12–29, 10–22
Pts: Dubak 8 Rebs: Radonjić 7 Asts: Dubak 2		Pts: Žižić 17; Rebs: Žižić 11; Asts: Bender 7

Palace of Sports, Kyiv
Referees: Benjamin Jimenez Trujillo (ESP), Sergei Beliakov (RUS), Nikolaos Somos (GRE)

13 August 2013
18:45

Report

Ukraine	89–82	Montenegro
Scoring by quarter: 23–17, 25–13, 19–26, 22–26
Pts: Mykhailiuk 31; Rebs: Mykhailiuk 13; Asts: Zotov 9		Pts: Popović 22; Rebs: Popović 9 Asts: Carapic 4

Palace of Sports, Kyiv
Referees: Clemens Fritz (GER), Oskars Lucis (LAT), Saulius Racys (SWE)

13 August 2013
21:00

Report

Serbia	76–56	Italy
Scoring by quarter: 22–10, 25–17, 16–8, 13–21
Pts: Glišić 21; Rebs: Glišić 14; Asts: Stojanović, Miladinović 4		Pts: Guariglia, Testa 7 Rebs: Guariglia 5 Asts: 4 players tied with 3

Palace of Sports, Kyiv
Referees: Benjamin Jimenez Trujillo (ESP), Nikolaos Somos (GRE), Mathieu Bayot (BEL)

13 August 2013
21:00

Report

France	69–78	Croatia
Scoring by quarter: 12–21, 24–19, 12–23, 21–15
Pts: Gombauld 17; Rebs: Blaess, Loubaki 6 Asts: Cham 4		Pts: Žižić 22; Rebs: Žižić 9 Asts: Skokna 6

Palace of Sports, Kyiv
Referees: Sérgio Silva (POR), Janusz Calik (POL), Yener Yilmaz (TUR)

14 August 2013
16:30

Report

Croatia	69–63	Serbia
Scoring by quarter: 25–19, 15–14, 12–16, 17–14
Pts: Žižić 20; Rebs: Žižić 18; Asts: Skokna 7		Pts: Stojanović 23; Rebs: Stojanović 6 Asts: 4 players tied with 2

Palace of Sports, Kyiv
Referees: Oskars Lucis (LAT), Clemens Fritz (GER), Christoph Rohacky (AUT)

14 August 2013
18:45

Report

Italy	79–66	Montenegro
Scoring by quarter: 22–23, 18–20, 21–7, 18–16
Pts: Pecchia 22; Rebs: Rattalino, La Torre 8 Asts: La Torre 7		Pts: Popović 14; Rebs: Popović 9 Asts: Cupara, Popović 3

Palace of Sports, Kyiv
Referees: Sérgio Silva (POR), Sergei Beliakov (RUS), Ciprian Stoica (ROU)

14 August 2013
21:00

Report

France	61–59	Ukraine
Scoring by quarter: 17–16, 19–15, 12–11, 13–17
Pts: Gombauld 17; Rebs: Noua 13; Asts: Ona Embo 3		Pts: Mykhailiuk 24; Rebs: Berozkin, Zotov 6 Asts: Zotov 7

Palace of Sports, Kyiv
Referees: Mindaugas Vecerskis (LTU), Mathieu Bayot (BEL), Matej Spendl (SLO)

== Classification Group G ==
The last team of each group of the First Round will compete in this Classification Round.

Team	Pld	W	L	PF	PA	PD	Pts
Poland	3	3	0	241	158	+83	6
Belgium	3	2	1	192	217	−25	5
Sweden	3	1	2	172	205	−33	4
Latvia	3	0	3	199	224	−25	3

12 August 2013
14:15

Report

Belgium	84–80 (OT)	Latvia
Scoring by quarter: 16–17, 17–19, 16–15, 22–20, Overtime: 13–9
Pts: Akyazili 27; Rebs: Akyazili 6 Asts: Akyazili 5		Pts: Birkans 20; Rebs: Birkans 8 Asts: Birkans 6

Palace of Sports, Kyiv
Referees: Clemens Fritz (GER), Gentian Cici (ALB), Ciprian Stoica (ROU)

12 August 2013
14:15

Report

Sweden	56–80	Poland
Scoring by quarter: 8–13, 16–20, 9–22, 23–25
Pts: Bodin 14; Rebs: Lecesne 9 Asts: Lecesne 4		Pts: Ponitka 25; Rebs: Sewiol 15; Asts: 3 players tied with 4

Palace of Sports, Kyiv
Referees: Roman Ponomarenko (UKR), Manuel Mazzoni (ITA), Navitalai Naivalu (FIJ)

13 August 2013
14:15

Report

Poland	83–43	Belgium
Scoring by quarter: 21–14, 22–8, 25–15, 15–6
Pts: Sewiol 26; Rebs: Sewiol 12; Asts: Scibisz 4		Pts: Riahi 13; Rebs: Akyazili 4 Asts: Riahi 4

Palace of Sports, Kyiv
Referees: Sergei Beliakov (RUS), Ciprian Stoica (ROU), Ventsislav Velikov (BUL)

13 August 2013
14:15

Report

Latvia	60–62	Sweden
Scoring by quarter: 16–24, 22–10, 14–18, 8–10
Pts: Birkans 17; Rebs: Strautiņš 14; Asts: Birkans, Kokins 3		Pts: Berkelund 14; Rebs: Johansson 7 Asts: Brändmark 4

Palace of Sports, Kyiv
Referees: Regis Bardera (FRA), Mindaugas Vecerskis (LTU), Irakli Berishvili (GEO)

14 August 2013
14:15

Report

Belgium	65–54	Sweden
Scoring by quarter: 10–10, 14–8, 22–17, 19–19
Pts: Casero 19; Rebs: Rogiers 7 Asts: Riahi 4		Pts: Lecesne 16; Rebs: Silveira 11; Asts: 3 players tied with 3

Palace of Sports, Kyiv
Referees: Gentian Cici (ALB), Nikolaos Somos (GRE), Navitalai Naivalu (FIJ)

14 August 2013
14:15

Report

Poland	78–59	Latvia
Scoring by quarter: 14–21, 19–9, 17–15, 28–14
Pts: Ponitka 18; Rebs: Sewiol 7 Asts: Walczak 6		Pts: Zoriks 15; Rebs: Garoza 9 Asts: Raimo 4

Palace of Sports, Kyiv
Referees: Benjamin Jimenez Trujillo (ESP), Yener Yilmaz (TUR), Irakli Berishvili (GEO)

== 9th – 16th Place Playoff ==
16 August 2013
14:15

Report

Lithuania	83–74	Latvia
Scoring by quarter: 29–30, 15–15, 18–5, 21–24
Pts: Sedekerskis 22; Rebs: Echodas 11; Asts: Svambaris 7		Pts: Kohs 19; Rebs: Garoza 11; Asts: Birkans 6

Palace of Sports, Kyiv
Referees: Clemens Fritz (GER), Nikolaos Somos (GRE), Navitalai Naivalu (FIJ)

16 August 2013
16:30

Report

Russia	78–67	Belgium
Scoring by quarter: 24–21, 21–12, 17–19, 16–15
Pts: Yakushin 17; Rebs: Karpenkov 11; Asts: Dobrynin 9		Pts: Akyazili 34; Rebs: Vanlaer, Birkans 5 Asts: Riahi 3

Palace of Sports, Kyiv
Referees: Aleksandar Glisic (SRB), Saulius Racys (SWE), Irakli Berishvili (GEO)

16 August 2013
18:45

Report

Ukraine	100–58	Sweden
Scoring by quarter: 32–18, 23–19, 27–6, 18–15
Pts: Mykhailiuk 28; Rebs: Mykhailiuk 9 Asts: Zotov 5		Pts: Lecesne 16; Rebs: Sjöberg 6 Asts: Bodin 4

Palace of Sports, Kyiv
Referees: Tomislav Hordov (CRO), Manuel Mazzoni (ITA), Yener Yilmaz (TUR)

16 August 2013
21:00

Report

Montenegro	74–82	Poland
Scoring by quarter: 16–19, 25–22, 11–23, 22–18
Pts: Carapic 20; Rebs: Radonjic 10; Asts: 3 players tied with 2		Pts: Sewiol 21; Rebs: Sewiol 11; Asts: Scibisz 5

Palace of Sports, Kyiv
Referees: Regis Bardera (FRA), Christoph Rohacky (AUT), Mathieu Bayot (BEL)

=== Classification games for 13th – 16th place ===
17 August 2013
14:15

Report

Sweden	56–58	Belgium
Scoring by quarter: 7–12, 20–17, 14–14, 15–15
Pts: Lecesne 19; Rebs: Sjöberg 11; Asts: 3 players tied with 2		Pts: Beaujean 14; Rebs: Riahi 6 Asts: 3 players tied with 2

Palace of Sports, Kyiv
Referees: Regis Bardera (FRA), Navitalai Naivalu (FIJ), Christoph Rohacky (AUT)

17 August 2013
16:30

Report

Latvia	71–69	Montenegro
Scoring by quarter: 17–12, 23–18, 16–29, 15–10
Pts: Strautiņš 20; Rebs: Birkans 6 Asts: Krumins 5		Pts: Vukcevic 21; Rebs: Radonjic 14; Asts: Bakic 5

Palace of Sports, Kyiv
Referees: Sergei Beliakov (RUS), Matej Spendl (SLO), Ciprian Stoica (ROU)

=== Classification games for 9th – 12th place ===
17 August 2013
18:45

Report

Ukraine	77–69	Russia
Scoring by quarter: 21–16, 15–11, 23–22, 18–20
Pts: Mykhailiuk 20; Rebs: Khytov 7 Asts: Zotov 4		Pts: Karpenkov 20; Rebs: Karpenkov 11; Asts: Yakushin 5

Palace of Sports, Kyiv
Referees: Milos Koljensic (MNE), Nikolaos Somos (GRE), Ventsislav Velikov (BUL)

17 August 2013
21:00

Report

Lithuania	84–79 (OT)	Poland
Scoring by quarter: 17–12, 19–13, 19–29, 12–13, Overtime: 17–12
Pts: Echodas 23; Rebs: Varnas 10; Asts: Varnas 5		Pts: Ponitka 22; Rebs: Bender 10; Asts: Ponitka 5

Palace of Sports, Kyiv
Referees: Benjamin Jimenez Trujillo (ESP), Yener Yilmaz (TUR), Irakli Berishvili (GEO)

== 1st – 8th Place Playoff ==
Quarter-finals
16 August 2013 – 14:15
Greece	42
France	38
16 August 2013 – 21:00
Serbia	76
Germany	50
16 August 2013 – 18:45
Croatia	59
Spain	61
16 August 2013 – 16:30
Turkey	73
Italy	82

Semi-finals
17 August 2013 – 18:45
Greece	49
Serbia	65
17 August 2013 – 21:00
Spain	57
Italy	51

Final
18 August 2013 – 21:30
Serbia	63
Spain	65
Third place
18 August 2013 – 18:45
Greece	78
Italy	50

=== Quarterfinals ===
16 August 2013
14:15

Report

Greece	42–38	France
Scoring by quarter: 7–10, 6–10, 14–10, 15–8
Pts: Charalampopoulos 14; Rebs: Papagiannis 13; Asts: Koniaris 3		Pts: Gombauld 9 Rebs: Gombauld 12; Asts: 3 players tied with 2

Palace of Sports, Kyiv
Referees: Benjamin Jimenez Trujillo (ESP), Oskars Lucis (LAT), Ventsislav Velikov (BUL)

16 August 2013
16:30

Report

Turkey	73–82	Italy
Scoring by quarter: 19–21, 22–23, 11–15, 21–23
Pts: Korkmaz 28; Rebs: Yurtseven 8 Asts: Arna, Havsa 4		Pts: La Torre 28; Rebs: La Torre 11; Asts: La Torre, Bucarelli 5

Palace of Sports, Kyiv
Referees: Milos Koljensic (MNE), Mindaugas Vecerskis (LTU), Matej Spendl (SLO)

16 August 2013
18:45

Report

Croatia	59–61	Spain
Scoring by quarter: 16–17, 5–19, 23–20, 15–5
Pts: Mazalin 28; Rebs: Bender 19; Asts: Bender 4		Pts: Lopez-Arosteguj 21; Rebs: Rodriguez 10; Asts: Lopez-Arostegui, Perez 4

Palace of Sports, Kyiv
Referees: Sérgio Silva (POR), Gentian Cici (ALB), Roman Ponomarenko (UKR)

16 August 2013
21:00

Report

Serbia	76–50	Germany
Scoring by quarter: 18–8, 26–16, 14–16, 18–10
Pts: Peno 23; Rebs: Peno 8 Asts: Peno 9		Pts: Beyschlag 12; Rebs: Kiel 9 Asts: Beyschlag 4

Palace of Sports, Kyiv
Referees: Sergei Beliakov (RUS), Janusz Calik (POL), Ciprian Stoica (ROU)

==== Classification games for 5th – 8th place ====
17 August 2013
14:15

Report

Croatia	83–73	Turkey
Scoring by quarter: 23–18, 24–20, 15–15, 21–20
Pts: Mazalin 44; Rebs: Zizic 15; Asts: Bender 6		Pts: Korkmaz 22; Rebs: Durmaz 11; Asts: 3 players tied with 3

Palace of Sports, Kyiv
Referees: Clemens Fritz (GER), Manuel Mazzoni (ITA), Janusz Calik (POL)

17 August 2013
16:30

Report

France	58–53	Germany
Scoring by quarter: 14–10, 10–18, 18–10, 16–15
Pts: Gombauld 17; Rebs: Gombauld, Ona Embo 6 Asts: Leboeuf, Loubaki 3		Pts: Kiel 12; Rebs: Kratzer 7 Asts: Merz 3

Palace of Sports, Kyiv
Referees: Aleksandar Glisic (SRB), Roman Ponomarenko (UKR), Mindaugas Vecerskis (LTU)

=== Semifinals ===
17 August 2013
18:45

Report

Greece	49–65	Serbia
Scoring by quarter: 11–13, 12–23, 13–17, 13–12
Pts: 3 players tied with 9 Rebs: Papagiannis 9 Asts: Charalampopoulos, Skoulidas 2		Pts: Milos Glisić 17; Rebs: David Miladinović 10; Asts: Stefan Peno 6

Palace of Sports, Kyiv
Referees: Sérgio Silva (POR), Gentian Cici (ALB), Saulius Racys (SWE)

17 August 2013
21:00

Report

Spain	57–51	Italy
Scoring by quarter: 12–13, 10–15, 18–10, 17–13
Pts: Perez 15; Rebs: Yusta 8 Asts: Lopez-Arostegui 5		Pts: Moretti 15; Rebs: Cattapan 10; Asts: La Torre 4

Palace of Sports, Kyiv
Referees: Tomislav Hordov (CRO), Oskars Lucis (LAT), Mathieu Bayot (BEL)

== Final classification games ==
=== Match for 15th place ===
18 August 2013
14:15

Report

Montenegro	78–72	Sweden
Scoring by quarter: 19–22, 18–25, 17–15, 24–10
Pts: Popović 34; Rebs: Popović 12; Asts: Cupara 7		Pts: Berkelund 15; Rebs: Silveira 11; Asts: Brändmark 4

Palace of Sports, Kyiv
Referees: Sérgio Silva (POR), Mindaugas Vecerskis (LTU), Irakli Berishvili (GEO)

=== Match for 13th place ===
18 August 2013
16:30

Report

Latvia	73–62	Belgium
Scoring by quarter: 15–17, 15–13, 22–18, 21–14
Pts: Strautiņš 17; Rebs: Strautiņš 11; Asts: Birkans 5		Pts: Akyazili 20; Rebs: Vervoort 5 Asts: Casero 4

Palace of Sports, Kyiv
Referees: Milos Koljensic (MNE), Saulius Racys (SWE), Ventsislav Velikov (BUL)

=== Match for 11th place ===
18 August 2013
21:00

Report

Poland	65–80	Russia
Scoring by quarter: 9–16, 23–32, 19–12, 14–20
Pts: Ponitka 15; Rebs: Sewiol 5 Asts: 3 players tied with 3		Pts: Yakushin 17; Rebs: Karpenkov 11; Asts: Yakushin 6

Palace of Sports, Kyiv
Referees: Gentian Cici (ALB), Manuel Mazzoni (ITA), Navitalai Naivalu (FIJ)

=== Match for 9th place ===
18 August 2013
18:45

Report

Lithuania	82–68	Ukraine
Scoring by quarter: 15–15, 27–16, 16–22, 24–15
Pts: Varnas 22; Rebs: Varnas 11; Asts: Varnas 9		Pts: Mykhailiuk 28; Rebs: Mykhailiuk 11; Asts: Mykhailiuk 5

Palace of Sports, Kyiv
Referees: Regis Bardera (FRA), Janusz Calik (POL), Christoph Rohacky (AUT)

=== Match for 7th place ===
18 August 2013
14:15

Report

Germany	38–51	Turkey
Scoring by quarter: 10–7, 9–14, 9–12, 10–18
Pts: Kiel, Schmikale 8 Rebs: Kiel 15; Asts: Figge, Taras 2		Pts: Korkmaz 28; Rebs: Ülker, Korkmaz 8 Asts: Ülker 4

Palace of Sports, Kyiv
Referees: Tomislav Hordov (CRO), Matej Spendl (SLO), Mathieu Bayot (BEL)

=== Match for 5th place ===
18 August 2013
16:30

Report

France	59–48	Croatia
Scoring by quarter: 19–17, 16–2, 14–17, 10–12
Pts: Gombauld 15; Rebs: Noua 11; Asts: Ona Embo 3		Pts: Skokna 12; Rebs: Bender, Mazalin 10; Asts: Mazalin 4

Palace of Sports, Kyiv
Referees: Oskars Lucis (LAT), Nikolaos Somos (GRE), Ciprian Stoica (ROU)

=== Bronze medal match ===
18 August 2013
18:45

Report

Greece	78–50	Italy
Scoring by quarter: 22–9, 12–15, 20–8, 24–18
Pts: Papagiannis 22; Rebs: Papagiannis 11; Asts: Skoulidas 5		Pts: La Torre 22; Rebs: La Torre 10; Asts: La Torre 4

Palace of Sports, Kyiv
Referees: Aleksandar Glisić (SRB), Benjamin Jimenez Trujillo (ESP), Yener Yilmaz (TUR)

=== Final ===
18 August 2013
21:30

Report

Serbia	63–65 (OT)	Spain
Scoring by quarter: 15–17, 18–13, 9–15, 13–10, Overtime: 8–10
Pts: Rakićević 19; Rebs: Peno 10; Asts: Jovanović 4		Pts: Rodriguez 15; Rebs: Rodriguez 14; Asts: Rodriguez, Lopez-Arostegui 4

Palace of Sports, Kyiv
Attendance: 1450
Referees: Clemens Fritz (GER), Sergei Beliakov (RUS), Roman Ponomarenko (UKR)

== Final standings ==
Rank	Team
1st place, gold medalist(s)	Spain
2nd place, silver medalist(s)	Serbia
3rd place, bronze medalist(s)	Greece
4th	Italy
5th	France
6th	Croatia
7th	Turkey
8th	Germany
9th	Lithuania
10th	Ukraine
11th	Russia
12th	Poland
13th	Latvia
14th	Belgium
15th	Montenegro
16th	Sweden

2013 FIBA Europe Under-16 Championship winners

Spain
Third title

Qualified for the 2014 FIBA Under-17 World Championship
Relegated to the 2014 FIBA Europe Under-16 Championship Division B

== All-Tournament Team ==
- (Serbia) Stefan Peno (MVP)
- (Ukraine) Sviatoslav Mykhailiuk
- (Spain) Xabier Lopez-Arostegui
- (Serbia) Milos Glisic
- (Greece) Georgios Papagiannis
