= 2014–15 Panathinaikos B.C. season =

Panathinaikos
2014–15 season
- Chairman: Dimitrios Giannakopoulos
- Head coach: Duško Ivanović
- Arena: Olympic Indoor Hall
- Euroleague: Quarterfinalists
- Greek League: 2nd
- Greek Cup: Champions
Home	Away

The 2014–15 season of Panathinaikos B.C. is the 52nd season of the basketball club in the highest division of Greek basketball. The club plays its home games at the Olympic Indoor Hall.

== Roster ==
Note: Flags indicate national team eligibility at FIBA-sanctioned events. Players may hold other non-FIBA nationalities not displayed.

Panathinaikos B.C. roster
Players
Coaches
}

Pos.	No.	Nat.	Name	Ht.	Wt.	Age
G/F	3	(Montenegro)	Pavlović, Aleksandar	2.01 m (6 ft 7 in)	107 kg (236 lb)	42 – 15 November 1983
F	5	(Greece)	Charalampopoulos, Vassilis	2.06 m (6 ft 9 in)	106.5 kg (235 lb)	29 – 6 January 1997
PG	6	(Greece)	Koniaris, Antonis (injured)	1.96 m (6 ft 5 in)	86 kg (190 lb)	28 – 30 September 1997
CG	7	(Greece)	Bochoridis, Lefteris	1.96 m (6 ft 5 in)	91 kg (201 lb)	32 – 7 April 1994
G/F	8	(Greece)	Janković, Vlado	2.02 m (6 ft 8 in)	100 kg (220 lb)	36 – 3 March 1990
PF	9	(Greece)	Fotsis, Antonis	2.09 m (6 ft 10 in)	113.4 kg (250 lb)	45 – 1 April 1981
C	10	(Serbia)	Raduljica, Miroslav	2.13 m (7 ft 0 in)	116 kg (256 lb)	38 – 5 January 1988
SG	11	(Greece)	Pappas, Nikos (injured)	1.95 m (6 ft 5 in)	97.5 kg (215 lb)	36 – 11 July 1990
PG	13	(Greece)	Diamantidis, Dimitris (C)	1.96 m (6 ft 5 in)	88 kg (194 lb)	46 – 6 May 1980
PF	14	(United States)	Gist, James (S)	2.06 m (6 ft 9 in)	106.5 kg (235 lb)	39 – 26 October 1986
PG	15	(Greece)	Calathes, Nick	1.98 m (6 ft 6 in)	97 kg (214 lb)	37 – 7 February 1989
C	19	(Greece)	Papagiannis, Georgios	2.18 m (7 ft 2 in)	125 kg (276 lb)	29 – 3 July 1997
CG	20	(Greece)	Lountzis, Michalis	1.95 m (6 ft 5 in)	90 kg (198 lb)	28 – 4 August 1998
C	21	(Serbia)	Kuzmić, Ognjen	2.13 m (7 ft 0 in)	114 kg (251 lb)	36 – 16 May 1990

Head coach

- (Serbia) Aleksandar Đorđević

Assistant coach(es)

- (Serbia) Milan Minić
- (Croatia) Goran Bjedov
- (Slovenia) Sani Bečirovič
- (Greece) Nikos Pappas

Athletic trainer(s)

- (Greece) Savvas Aronis

Team manager

- (Greece) Fragiskos Alvertis

Legend

- (C) Team captain
- Injured

- Roster
Updated: July 27, 2015

== Transactions ==
=== In ===
No.	Pos.	Nat.	Name	Age	Moving from		Type	Ends	Transfer fee	Date	Source
	PG	(Greece)	Michalis Lountzis	16	Kronos Agiou Dimitriou	(Greece)	Transfer	2019	—	23 June 2014	
19	C	(Greece)	Georgios Papagiannis	17	Westtown School	(United States)	Transfer	2015	—	25 June 2014	
6	SG	(United States)	A. J. Slaughter	27	Élan Chalon	(France)	Transfer	2016	—	16 July 2014	
15	C	(Uruguay)	Esteban Batista	31	Pınar Karşıyaka	(Turkey)	Transfer	2016	—	18 July 2014	
10	PG	(United States)	DeMarcus Nelson	28	KK Crvena zvezda	(Serbia)	Transfer	2016	—	22 July 2014	
16	PG	(Greece)	Antonis Koniaris	17	PAOK	(Greece)	Transfer	2019	—	24 July 2014	
7	PG	(Greece)	Lefteris Bochoridis	20	Aris	(Greece)	Transfer	2019	—	29 July 2014	
18	G	(Latvia)	Jānis Blūms	32	Astana	(Kazakhstan)	Transfer	2015	—	2 October 2014	
	C	(Nigeria)	Gani Lawal	26	Trabzonspor	(Turkey)	Transfer	—	31 January 2015		
	C	(United States)	Julian Wright	31	Krasnye Krylia	(Russia)	Transfer	—	31 January 2015		

=== Out ===
No.	Pos.	Nat.	Name	Age	Moving to		Type	Transfer fee	Date	Source
	C	(Gabon)	Stéphane Lasme	31	Anadolu Efes	(Turkey)	Transfer	—	22 June 2014	
	C	(United States)	Michael Batiste	36	Retired					
	PF	(China)	Shang Ping	29	Shanxi Zhongyu	(China)	Transfer	—	12 June 2014	
	SF	(Lithuania)	Jonas Mačiulis	29	Real Madrid Baloncesto	(Spain)	Transfer	—	14 June 2014	
	SF	(Greece)	Michael Bramos	27	Free agent			—	12 June 2014	
	SG	(United States)	Ramel Curry	34	Limoges	(France)	Transfer	—	12 June 2014	
	SG	(Croatia)	Roko Ukić	29	Cedevita Zagreb	(Croatia)	Transfer	—	12 June 2014	
	PG	(Bosnia and Herzegovina)	Zack Wright	29	İstanbul BB	(Turkey)	Transfer	—	12 June 2014	
	PG	(Greece)	Georgios Apostolidis	30	Doxa Lefkadas	(Greece)	Transfer	—	12 June 2014	

== Euroleague ==
=== Regular season ===
Standings

Pos	Team	Pld	W	L	PF	PA	PD
1	(Spain) FC Barcelona (A)	10	9	1	861	738	+123
2	(Turkey) Fenerbahçe Ülker (A)	10	8	2	843	787	+56
3	(Greece) Panathinaikos (A)	10	5 (Note: Tiebreaker: 1–1 (+25))	5	768	743	+25
4	(Italy) EA7 Milano (A)	10	5 (Note: Tiebreaker: 1–1 (–25))	5	775	795	−20
5	(Germany) Bayern Munich (E)	10	2	8	806	866	−60
6	(Poland) PGE Turów (E)	10	1	9	773	897	−124

(A) Advance to Top 16; (E) Enter 2014–15 Eurocup Basketball last 32 round
Notes:

Game	Date	Team	Score	High points	High rebounds	High assists	Location Attendance	Record
1	October 17	vs (Poland) PGE Turów	W 84–77	Slaughter & Pappas (16)	Batista (7)	Diamantidis (4)	O.A.C.A. 8,300	1–0
2	October 23	@ (Germany) Bayern Munich	L 81–75	Batista (18)	Batista (7)	Diamantidis (7)	Audidome; 5,758	1–1
3	October 30	vs (Turkey) Fenerbahçe	W 91–73	Slaughter (23)	Fotsis (6)	Diamantidis (10)	O.A.C.A. 14,500	2–1
4	November 7	vs (Italy) EA7 Milano	W 90–63	Batista (15)	Diamantidis (7)	Diamantidis (6)	O.A.C.A. 10,500	3–1
5	November 14	@ (Spain) FC Barcelona	L 78–69	Batista (14)	Batista (8)	Diamantidis (4)	Palau Blaugrana; 5,254	3–2
6	October 30	@ (Poland) PGE Turów	W 69–79	Mavrokefalidis (21)	Janković (7)	Slaughter & Diamantidis (3)	Centrum Sportowe; 1,797	4–2

As of 24 November 2014.
