= 2020–21 Ohio Valley Conference men's basketball season =

- League: NCAA Division I
- Sport: Basketball
- Teams: 12

Regular season

Tournament

Ohio Valley men's basketball seasons
- 2019–20 2021–22

2020–21 Ohio Valley Conference men's basketball standings
	Conf.				Overall
Team	W		L	PCT	W		L	PCT
Belmont	18	–	2	.900	26	–	4	.867
Morehead State †	17	–	3	.850	23	–	8	.742
Eastern Kentucky	15	–	5	.750	22	–	7	.759
Jacksonville State	13	–	6	.684	18	–	9	.667
Austin Peay	10	–	10	.500	14	–	13	.519
Murray State	10	–	10	.500	13	–	13	.500
Southeast Missouri State	9	–	11	.450	11	–	16	.407
SIU Edwardsville	7	–	12	.368	9	–	17	.346
Eastern Illinois	6	–	14	.300	9	–	18	.333
UT Martin	6	–	14	.300	8	–	16	.333
Tennessee Tech	5	–	15	.250	5	–	22	.185
Tennessee State	3	–	17	.150	4	–	19	.174
† 2021 OVC tournament winner

The 2020–21 Ohio Valley Conference men's basketball season began with practices in October 2020, followed by the start of the 2020–21 NCAA Division I men's basketball season in November. Conference play begins in January 2021 and ended in March 2021.

This was the final season for Eastern Kentucky and Jacksonville State as OVC members. On January 29, 2021, the ASUN Conference announced that both schools would join that conference on July 1 of that year.

== Preseason Awards ==
The preseason coaches' poll and league awards were announced by the league office on November 4, 2020.

=== Preseason men's basketball coaches poll ===
Rank	Team
T1.	Austin Peay (9)- 226
T1.	Murray State (10)- 226
3.	Belmont (5)- 214
4.	Eastern Kentucky- 173
5.	Eastern Illinois- 153
6.	Tennessee State- 139
7.	Jacksonville State- 124
8.	Morehead State- 87
9.	Tennessee Tech- 84
10.	UT-Martin- 80
11.	SIU Edwardsville- 48
12.	Southeast Missouri State- 30
(first place votes)

== Honors ==
Preseason All-OVC Team	Jordyn Adams, Austin Peay
Preseason All-OVC Team	Tevin Brown, Murray State
Preseason All-OVC Team	Jomaru Brown, Eastern Kentucky
Preseason All-OVC Team	Jr. Clay, Tennessee Tech
Preseason All-OVC Team	Tre King, Eastern Kentucky
Preseason All-OVC Team	Carlos Marshall Jr., Tennessee State
Preseason All-OVC Team	Grayson Murphy, Belmont
Preseason All-OVC Team	Nick Muszynski, Belmont
Preseason All-OVC Team	Mack Smith, Eastern Illinois
Preseason All-OVC Team	Parker Stewart, UT Martin
Preseason All-OVC Team	Terry Taylor, Austin Peay
Preseason All-OVC Team	Josiah Wallace, Eastern Illinois
Preseason All-OVC Team	KJ Williams, Murray State

== Conference matrix ==
	Austin Peay	Belmont	Eastern Illinois	Eastern Kentucky	Jacksonville State	Morehead State	Murray State	SE Missouri State	SIU Edwardsville	Tennessee State	Tennessee Tech	UT Martin
vs. Austin Peay	–	1−0	1−1	1−1	2−0	1−0	1−1	1−1	0−2	0−2	1−1	1−1
vs. Belmont	0−1	–	0−2	1−1	0−2	1−1	0−2	0−1	0−2	0−2	0−2	0−2
vs. Eastern Illinois	1−1	2−0	–	2−0	1−0	1−0	0−2	2−0	1−1	1−1	1−1	2–0
vs. Eastern Kentucky	1–1	1−1	0−2	–	0−2	1−1	1−0	1−1	0–1	0−2	0–2	0−2
vs. Jacksonville State	0−2	2−0	0−1	2−0	–	2−0	0−2	0−1	0–1	0–2	0−2	0−2
vs. Morehead State	0−1	1−1	0−1	1−1	0−2	–	0−2	0−2	1–1	0–2	0−2	0–2
vs. Murray State	1−1	2−0	2−0	0−1	2−0	2−0	–	0–2	0−2	0−1	1−1	0−2
vs. SE Missouri State	1–1	1−0	0−2	1−1	1−0	2−0	2–0	–	0−2	0−2	1−1	2−0
vs. SIU Edwardsville	2−0	2−0	1−1	1–0	1–0	1–1	2−0	2−0	–	0−2	0−1	0–2
vs. Tennessee State	2−0	2−0	1−1	2−0	2–0	2–0	1−0	2−0	2−0	–	1−1	0−1
vs. Tennessee Tech	1−1	2–0	1−1	2−0	2−0	2−0	1−1	1−1	1−0	1−1	−	1−0
vs. UT Martin	1−1	2−0	0–2	2−0	2−0	2–0	2−0	0−2	2−0	1−0	0−1	–
Total	10−10	18−2	6−14	15−5	13−6	17−3	10−10	9−11	7−12	3−17	5−15	6−14

== All-OVC awards ==
=== Ohio Valley men's basketball weekly awards ===
Week	Player(s) of the Week	School	Newcomer of the Week	School
Nov 30				
Dec 7				
Dec 14				
Dec 21				
Dec 28				
Jan 4				
Jan 11				
Jan 18				
Jan 25				
Feb 1				
Feb 8				
Feb 15				
Feb 22				
Mar 1				
