= Dionysis Skoulidas =

Greek basketball player

Sakis Skoulidas Σάκης Σκουλίδας
- Skoulidas in 2026

No. 10 – Mykonos
- Position: Small forward
- League: Greek Basketball League

Personal information
- Born: July 29, 1997 (age 29) Maroussi, Athens, Greece
- Listed height: 6 ft 7 in (2.01 m)
- Listed weight: 215 lb (98 kg)

Career information
- Playing career: 2012–present

Career history
- 2012–2016: Peristeri
- 2016–2018: AEK Athens
- 2017–2018: →Koroivos Amaliadas
- 2018–2019: Holargos
- 2019–2020: Charilaos Trikoupis
- 2020–2021: Olympiacos B
- 2021–2023: Eleftheroupoli Kavalas
- 2023–2024: Doxa Lefkadas
- 2024–present: Mykonos

Career highlights
- 2x Greek A2 Elite League champion (2020, 2025)
Medals
Representing Greece
Men's basketball
TBF Under-16 World Cup
Gold medal – first place	2013 Sakarya	Under-16
FIBA Europe Under-16 Championship
Bronze medal – third place	2013 Ukraine	Under-16
FIBA Europe Under-18 Championship
Gold medal – first place	2015 Greece	Under-18
FIBA Europe Under-20 Championship B
Bronze medal – third place	2016 Greece	Under-20
FIBA Europe Under-20 Championship
Gold medal – first place	2017 Greece	Under-20

Dionysis "Sakis" Skoulidas (alternate spelling: Dionisis) (Greek: Διονύσης "Σάκης" Σκουλίδας; born July 29, 1997) is a Greek professional basketball player and the vice–captain for Mykonos of the Greek Basketball League. Born in Maroussi, Athens, Greece, he is a 2.01 m (6 ft 7 in) tall small forward.

== Youth career ==
Skoulidas played from a young age with the youth teams of AEK Peristeriou and Peristeri, before he started his pro career.

== Professional career ==
Skoulidas played for the first time in the top-tier level Greek Basket League, on 11 April 2012, at the age of 14. That was the only game that he played in during the 2011–12 Greek League season. The rest of that season, he played in Peristeri's youth club.

In the next season, 2012–13, he only played in Peristeri's youth club. In the 2013–14 and 2014–15 seasons, he played with Peristeri in the 3rd-tier level semi pro level Greek B League. Skoulidas signed his first professional contract with the senior men's team of Peristeri in 2015, at the age of 18, after he rejected an offer from AEK Athens, and renewed his contract with Peristeri, in order to have more playing time. In the subsequent 2015–16 season, he played with Peristeri in the Greek 2nd Division.

In July 2016, Skoulidas moved to AEK Athens. He was loaned to Koroivos Amaliadas for the 2017–18 season. After that, he moved with a free agent transfer to Holargos in July 2018.

On July 14, 2023, Skoulidas was signed by Greek 2nd Division club Doxa Lefkadas.

On June 26, 2024, Skoulidas joined Mykonos of the Greek A2 Elite League. After winning the Greek A2 Elite League championship with the club in 2025, Skoulidas renewed his contract with the club until 2026.

== National team career ==
With the Greek Under-16 junior national team, Skoulidas played at the 2012 FIBA Europe Under-16 Championship. He also played with Greece at the 2013 TBF Under-16 World Cup in Sakarya, Turkey, where he helped Greece win the gold medal. He also played at the 2013 FIBA Europe Under-16 Championship, where he won a bronze medal.

Skoulidas also played at the 2014 FIBA Europe Under-18 Championship, the 2015 FIBA Under-19 World Cup, the 2015 FIBA Europe Under-18 Championship, where he won a gold medal, and the 2nd division 2016 FIBA Europe Under-20 Championship Division B, where he won a bronze medal. He also played at the 2017 FIBA Europe Under-20 Championship, where he won a gold medal.

== Career statistics ==
=== Domestic Leagues ===
==== Regular season ====
Legend
GP	Games played	MPG	Minutes per game	FG%	Field goal percentage
3P%	3-point field goal percentage	FT%	Free throw percentage	RPG	Rebounds per game
APG	Assists per game	SPG	Steals per game	BPG	Blocks per game
PPG	Points per game	**Bold**	Career high		Led the league

Note: Only games in the primary domestic competitions are included. Therefore, games in cup or European competitions are left out.

Year	Team	League	GP	MPG	FG%	3P%	FT%	RPG	APG	SPG	BPG	PPG
2016–17	A.E.K.	GBL	13	5.5	.300	.286	-	.9	.5	.1	0	.6
2017–18	Koroivos	GBL	26	18.1	.427	.373	.700	2.3	1.0	.5	0	3.2
2018–19	Holargos	GBL	16	7.3	.240	.267	-	.3	.3	.2	0	1.0

=== FIBA Champions League ===
Year	Team	GP	MPG	FG%	3P%	FT%	RPG	APG	SPG	BPG	PPG
2016–17	A.E.K.	9	6.2	.250	.007	1.000	.6	.2	0	0	1.2
