= Ponitka =

Ponitka is a Polish surname. Notable people with the surname include:

- Georg Lota Ponitka (born 1952), German illustrator
- Marcel Ponitka (born 1997), Polish basketball player
- Mateusz Ponitka (born 1993), Polish basketball player
