= Georgios Papagiannis =

Greek basketball player (born 1997)

Georgios Papagiannis Γιώργος Παπαγιάννης
- Papagiannis with Anadolu Efes in 2026

No. 9 – Anadolu Efes
- Position: Center
- League: BSL; EuroLeague

Personal information
- Born: July 3, 1997 (age 29) Megara, Greece
- Listed height: 2.21 m (7 ft 3 in)
- Listed weight: 121 kg (267 lb)

Career information
- High school: Westtown School (West Chester, Pennsylvania); American School (Athens, Greece)
- NBA draft: 2016: 1st round, 13th overall pick
- Drafted by: Phoenix Suns
- Playing career: 2012–present

Career history
- 2012–2013: Peristeri
- 2014–2016: Panathinaikos
- 2016–2018: Sacramento Kings
- 2018: Portland Trail Blazers
- 2018–2023: Panathinaikos
- 2023–2024: Fenerbahçe
- 2024–2025: AS Monaco
- 2025–present: Anadolu Efes

Career highlights
- All-EuroLeague Second Team (2022); EuroLeague rebounding leader (2022); 2× EuroLeague blocks leader (2022, 2025); Turkish League champion (2024); 3× Greek League champion (2019–2021); 2× All-Greek League Team (2021, 2022); 4× Greek Cup winner (2015, 2016, 2019, 2021); Greek Super Cup winner (2021); Greek Super Cup Finals MVP (2021); LNB Pro A blocks leader (2025); Greek League blocks leader (2022); 3× Greek All-Star (2019, 2020, 2022); Greek All-Star Game Slam Dunk winner (2020)
- Stats at NBA.com
- Stats at Basketball Reference
Medals
Men's basketball
Representing Greece
European U-18 Championship
Gold medal – first place	2015 Greece	Under-18
European U-16 Championship
Bronze medal – third place	2013 Ukraine	Under-16

Georgios Papagiannis (Greek: Γιώργος Παπαγιάννης; born July 3, 1997), is a Greek professional basketball player for Anadolu Efes of the Basketbol Süper Ligi (BSL) and the EuroLeague. Born in Marousi, Attica, Greece, he is a 7 ft 2 3/4 in (2.20 m) tall center, with a 7 ft 6 in (2.29 m) wingspan. An All-EuroLeague Second Team selection in 2022, Papagiannis is a member of the senior National Team of Greece.

== Early life ==
Papagiannis was born in Marousi, a northern suburb of Athens, Greece, and spent his early years in Megara, in the western region of Athens. Papagiannis played at the Jordan Brand Classic International Game in 2013. He announced that he was committing to Westtown School in West Chester, Pennsylvania, in May 2013. He then attended school and played basketball at Westtown, during the 2013–14 academic school year and basketball season, as a high school junior. After his junior year of high school in the United States, he transferred to the American School in Athens, Greece, for his senior year of high school.

== Professional career ==
=== Peristeri (2012–2013) ===
Papagiannis made his senior men's club debut with Peristeri on January 5, 2012, at the age of 14, in a Greek Basket League 2011–12 season game against Panathinaikos. He became the youngest player to ever play in the modern era of the Greek Basket League (since the league first became fully professional, under the organization of HEBA, starting with the 1992–93 season). He also spent the entire 2012–13 season with Peristeri.

=== Panathinaikos (2014–2016) ===
On June 25, 2014, Papagiannis signed with Panathinaikos on a multi-year deal, yet there was a player option in the contract, which allowed him to leave Panathinaikos for a US college during the summer of 2015. Papagiannis, considered to be one of the biggest young European talent prospects, received scholarship offers from 17 USA colleges, including UConn, Arizona, Temple, NC State, Oregon, St. John's, and Kentucky. On July 8, 2015, it was announced that Papagiannis had chosen to continue playing for Panathinaikos. His Panathinaikos contract included a €500,000 buyout option.

Papagiannis was a member of the Panathinaikos teams that won both the 2015 edition and the 2016 edition of the Greek Cup. He also played in six games with Panathinaikos during the 2015–16 EuroLeague season competition, where he averaged 1.5 points and 1.7 rebounds per game, in 5 minutes per game. In the 2015–16 Greek League season, he averaged 6.5 points and 2.8 rebounds per game, in 11.5 minutes per game, in 23 games played.

=== Sacramento Kings (2016–2018) ===
In April 2016, Papagiannis entered the 2016 NBA draft, and was projected as a mid-to-late second-round pick, but he also garnered interest as a late first-round pick. However, on June 23, Papagiannis was selected with the 13th overall pick by the Phoenix Suns, becoming the highest drafted Greek player ever. His rights were later traded to the Sacramento Kings on draft night, and in July, he joined the Kings for the 2016 NBA Summer League. On July 15, 2016, he signed his rookie scale contract with the Kings. On November 5, 2016, he made his NBA debut in a 117–91 loss to the Milwaukee Bucks, recording two points and one rebound in six minutes off the bench. On March 18, 2017, he had his first double-double with 14 points and 11 rebounds in the Kings' 110–94 loss to the Oklahoma City Thunder. During his rookie season, he had multiple assignments with the Reno Bighorns of the NBA Development League.

On February 8, 2018, Papagiannis was waived by the Kings.

=== Portland Trail Blazers (2018) ===
On March 8, 2018, Papagiannis signed a 10-day contract with the Portland Trail Blazers. Despite not playing a single game for Portland at the end of his 10-day contract, Papagiannis signed a two-year contract on March 18. He appeared in one game with the Blazers. Papagiannis was waived by the Blazers after the end of the 2018 NBA Summer League.

=== Return to Panathinaikos (2018–2023) ===
On July 20, 2018, Papagiannis returned to Panathinaikos, signing a five-year contract, with the last two years of the contract being team options. The contract also included an NBA opt-out option, after the third year of the contract.

After the departure of Ioannis Papapetrou in the summer of 2022, Papagiannis was named team captain for the first time in his career. During the 2022–2023 campaign, in 33 EuroLeague games, he averaged 8.5 points, 5.7 rebounds and 1.2 blocks in 24 minutes per contest. Additionally, in 34 domestic league matches, he averaged 9.3 points, 6 rebounds, 1.3 assists and 1.2 blocks in 22 minutes per contest.

On July 14, 2023, after weeks of stagnant negotiations, Papagiannis informed Panathinaikos that he had rejected their contract renewal proposal and he would be leaving the club after a total of seven seasons together.

=== Fenerbahçe (2023–2024) ===
On July 15, 2023, Papagiannis signed a two-year deal with Turkish powerhouse Fenerbahçe, under his national team coach Dimitrios Itoudis.

=== AS Monaco (2024–2025) ===
Papagiannis spent the 2024–25 campaign with French-based club Monaco, reaching the EuroLeague final in Abu Dhabi.

=== Anadolu Efes (2025–present) ===
On July 16, 2025, Papagiannis signed a three-year (2+1) deal with Anadolu Efes of the Turkish Basketball Super League (BSL).

== National team career ==
=== Greek junior national team ===
With the Greek Under-16 junior national team, Papagiannis played at the 2012 FIBA Europe Under-16 Championship, which he led in blocks per game. He also played with Greece at the 2013 TBF Under-16 World Cup in Sakarya, Turkey, where he helped Greece win the gold medal. He also played at the 2013 FIBA Europe Under-16 Championship, where he won the bronze medal and was named to the All-Tournament Team, after leading the tournament in blocks per game.

Papagiannis also played at the 2015 FIBA Under-19 World Cup, and the 2015 FIBA Europe Under-18 Championship, where he was voted to the All-Tournament Team.

=== Greek senior national team ===
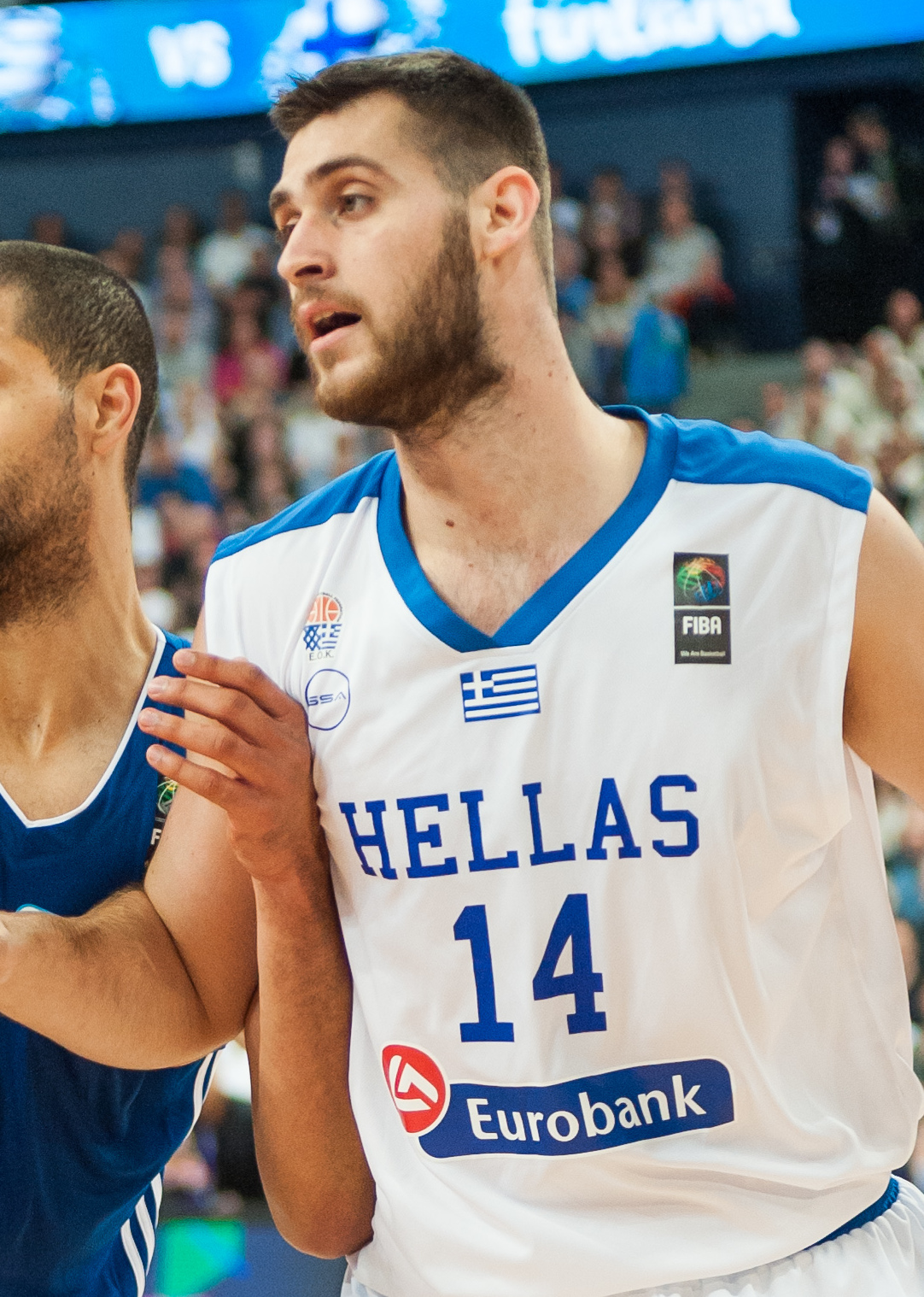
Papagiannis at the EuroBasket 2017

Papagiannis became a member of the senior Greek national basketball team in 2017. He played with Greece at the EuroBasket 2017, and at the 2019 FIBA World Cup qualification. He also played for Greece at the 2024 Paris Olympics.

== Career statistics ==
Legend
GP	Games played	GS	Games started	MPG	Minutes per game
FG%	Field-goal percentage	3P%	3-point field-goal percentage	FT%	Free-throw percentage
RPG	Rebounds per game	APG	Assists per game	SPG	Steals per game
BPG	Blocks per game	PPG	Points per game	PIR	Performance index rating
**Bold**	Career high

=== NBA ===
==== Regular season ====
Year	Team	GP	GS	MPG	FG%	3P%	FT%	RPG	APG	SPG	BPG	PPG
2016–17	Sacramento	**22**	0	**16.1**	.549	.000	**.857**	**3.9**	**.9**	.1	**.8**	**5.6**
2017–18	Sacramento	16	0	7.4	.415	—	—	2.3	.6	.1	.4	2.1
2017–18	Portland	1	0	3.7	**1.000**	—	—	1.0	—	**2.0**	—	2.0
Career		39	0	12.2	.514	.000	.857	3.1	.7	.2	.6	4.1

=== EuroLeague ===
*	Led the league

Year	Team	GP	GS	MPG	FG%	3P%	FT%	RPG	APG	SPG	BPG	PPG	PIR
2015–16	Panathinaikos	6	0	5.0	.308	—	.500	1.7	—	—	.3	1.5	1.3
2018–19	Panathinaikos	26	12	12.2	**.694**	—	.556	2.8	.2	.3	.6	4.0	5.2
2019–20	Panathinaikos	27	22	17.5	.620	.000	.667	4.7	.2	.4	.9	6.9	8.7
2020–21	Panathinaikos	32	22	21.9	.652	.125	.667	5.4	**1.0**	.3	1.6	8.8	13.6
2021–22	Panathinaikos	29	**23**	**28.4**	.643	—	.737	**8.2***	.9	**.8**	**1.7***	**10.3**	**17.4**
2022–23	Panathinaikos	33	22	23.7	.576	.486	.750	5.7	.7	.4	1.2	8.5	11.4
2023–24	Fenerbahçe	**38**	11	16.0	.617	**.488**	.667	3.1	.8	.3	.8	5.7	7.2
2024–25	AS Monaco	29	2	16.4	.600	.320	**.900**	3.4	.5	.5	1.4	6.9	8.7
Career		220	114	19.2	.620	.372	.718	4.6	.6	.5	1.1	7.2	10.1

=== Domestic leagues ===
Year	Team	League	GP	MPG	FG%	3P%	FT%	RPG	APG	SPG	BPG	PPG
2011–12	(Greece) Peristeri	HEBA A1	6	3.6	.400	—	1.000	1.2	—	—	—	0.8
2012–13	(Greece) Peristeri	GBL	4	15.8	.308	.000	1.000	1.5	1.2	.5	—	2.5
2014–15	(Greece) Panathinaikos	GBL	11	10.1	.553	—	.000	3.5	.1	.3	1.3	3.8
2015–16	(Greece) Panathinaikos	GBL	22	12.0	.680	—	.667	2.9	.5	.2	.7	6.8
2016–17	(United States) Reno Bighorns	D-League	23	32.1	.507	.500	.763	8.1	.5	.5	2.5	13.6
2017–18	(United States) Reno Bighorns	G League	10	27.1	.522	.000	.789	9.7	1.1	.4	1.5	13.5
2018–19	(Greece) Panathinaikos	GBL	28	13.3	.594	.000	.826	5.1	.6	.4	1.1	6.7
2019–20	(Greece) Panathinaikos	GBL	17	16.2	.732	.000	.629	5.8	.5	.3	1.2	9.6
2020–21	(Greece) Panathinaikos	GBL	31	21.4	.633	.000	.814	5.7	1.0	.6	1.3	10.2
2021–22	(Greece) Panathinaikos	GBL	31	27.1	.662	.000	.683	8.2	1.1	.4	1.6	10.3
2022–23	(Greece) Panathinaikos	GBL	32	21.8	.662	.467	.704	5.9	1.4	.3	1.2	9.4
2023–24	(Turkey) Fenerbahçe	TBSL	21	22.3	.591	.273	.826	5.7	1.1	.6	1.0	9.9

== Awards and accomplishments ==
=== Club career ===
- 3× Greek League Champion: (2019, 2020, 2021)
- 4× Greek Cup Winner: (2015, 2016, 2019, 2021)
- 3× Greek League All-Star: (2019, 2020, 2022)
- Greek All-Star Game Slam Dunk Contest Winner: (2020)

=== Greek junior national team ===
- 2012 FIBA Europe Under-16 Championship: Blocked Shots Leader
- 2013 TBF Under-16 World Cup: Gold
- 2013 FIBA Europe Under-16 Championship: Bronze
- 2013 FIBA Europe Under-16 Championship: All-Tournament Team
- 2013 FIBA Europe Under-16 Championship: Blocked Shots Leader
- 2015 FIBA Europe Under-18 Championship: Gold, All-Tournament Team
