= Antonis Koniaris =

Greek basketball player (born 1997)

Antonios Koniaris
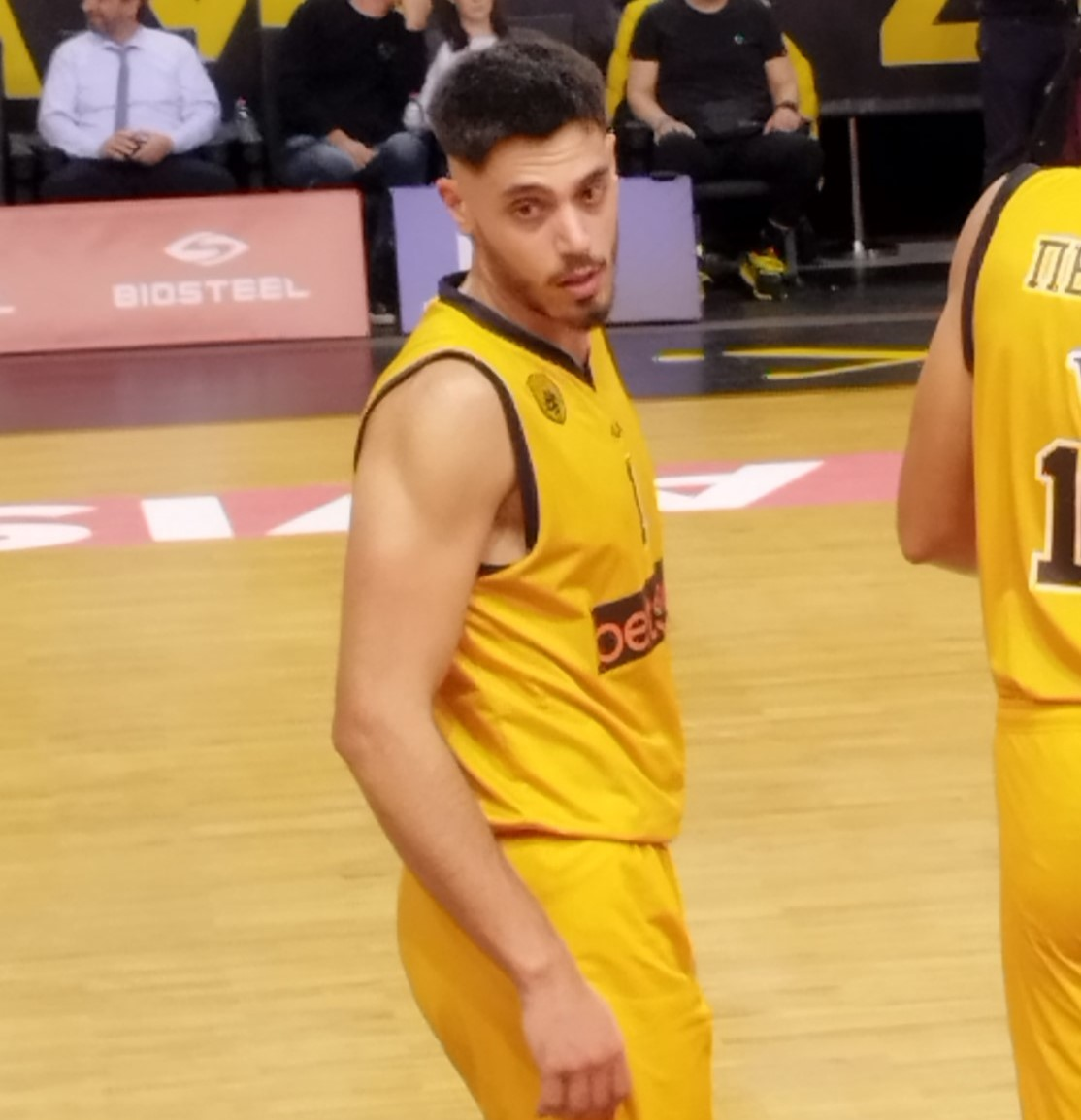
- Koniaris in action with AEK Athens

No. 6 – Maroussi
- Position: Point guard
- League: Greek Basketball League

Personal information
- Born: September 30, 1997 (age 29) Chania, Greece
- Listed height: 1.93 m (6 ft 4 in)
- Listed weight: 86 kg (190 lb)

Career information
- Playing career: 2013–present

Career history
- 2013–2014: PAOK Thessaloniki
- 2014–2016: Panathinaikos
- 2016–2019: PAOK Thessaloniki
- 2019–2021: Olympiacos
- 2021: →Obradoiro
- 2021: →Ionikos Nikaias
- 2021–2023: AEK Athens
- 2023–2024: Promitheas Patras
- 2024–2025: Lavrio
- 2025–2026: PAOK Thessaloniki
- 2026–present: Maroussi

Career highlights
- 2× Greek Cup winner (2015, 2016); 2× Greek League Best Young Player (2017, 2018); All-Greek League Defensive Team (2019); Greek All Star Game 3 Point Shootout winner (2018); TBF Under-16 World Cup MVP (2013)
Medals
Representing Greece
Men's basketball
TBF Under-16 World Cup
Gold medal – first place	2013 Sakarya	Under-16
FIBA Europe Under-16 Championship
Bronze medal – third place	2013 Ukraine	Under-16
FIBA Europe Under-20 Championship
Gold medal – first place	2017 Greece	Under-20

Antonis Koniaris (alternate spelling: Antonios) (Greek: Αντώνης Κόνιαρης; born September 30, 1997) is a Greek professional basketball player for Maroussi of the Greek Basketball League (GBL). He is a 1.93 m (6 ft 4 in) tall point guard.

== Early career ==
Koniaris began playing youth basketball during primary school, in 2006, after joining a local team in Akrotiri, Chania.

== Professional career ==
Koniaris began his pro career in 2013, after he signed the club PAOK.of the Greek Basketball League (GBL) On 24 July 2014, Koniaris' agent, Tasos Delimpaltadakis, announced via Twitter, that Panathinaikos had signed a young point guard. Some hours after this, Panathinaikos announced the signing of Koniaris, for 5 years. As a member of Panathinaikos, Koniaris won two Greek Cups, in 2015 and 2016.

On August 19, 2016, he returned to PAOK, after signing a three-year contract with them. On June 30, 2019, Koniaris signed a three-year contract (two years guaranteed, plus one option year) with the Greek EuroLeague club Olympiacos.

On July 1, 2019, he has signed a 3-year deal with Olympiacos of the EuroLeague. During his rookie season in Piraeus, Koniaris appeared in 24 EuroLeague Regular Season games, averaging 3.4 points, 1.4 assists and 1.4 rebounds as the back-up point guard of the team, under the instructions of coach Kęstutis Kemzūra at first and later of Georgios Bartzokas.

On January 16, 2021, after playing only friendly games and struggling for minutes with the Reds in the EuroLeague rotation, he went on loan to Monbus Obradoiro of the Liga ACB. On March 1, 2021, Koniaris left the Spanish club after a short spell of just 3 games in the Liga ACB. On March 5 of the same year, he returned to the Greek Basket League for Ionikos Nikaias, once again on loan from Olympiacos, until the end of the 2020–21 season.

On December 30, 2021, Koniaris, having recovered from a serious ACL injury, signed with AEK Athens through the summer of 2024. In 7 league games, he averaged 2.3 points, 0.9 rebounds, 0.7 assists and 0.6 steals in under 10 minutes per contest. During the 2022–2023 season, in 17 league games, he averaged 1 point, 1 rebound and 0.9 assists, playing around 10 minutes per contest.

On June 28, 2023, Koniaris moved to Promitheas Patras. In 24 domestic league matches, he averaged 5.5 points, 1.1 rebounds and 3.1 assists in 18 minutes per contest. Additionally, in 14 BCL games, he averaged 5.1 points, 1.4 rebounds and 2.8 assists in 18 minutes per contest. On June 19, 2024, Koniaris renewed his contract with Promitheas. However, on September 29 of the same year, he departed from the club.

On October 25, 2024, Koniaris signed with Lavrio.

On July 5, 2025, Koniaris returned to PAOK for a third stint.

== National team career ==
=== Greek junior national team ===
With the junior national teams of Greece, Koniaris won the gold medal at the 2013 TBF Under-16 World Cup in Sakarya, Turkey, where he helped Greece win the gold medal. He was named to the tournament's All-Tournament Team, and was also named the MVP of the tournament. He also won the bronze medal at the 2013 FIBA Europe Under-16 Championship.

He also played at the 2014 FIBA Europe Under-18 Championship, and at the 2014 FIBA Under-17 World Cup. He was selected by head coach Ilias Papatheodorou to play at the 2015 FIBA Under-19 World Cup, but he was suffering from OCD in his right ankle, which ruled him out. He also played at the 2016 FIBA Europe Under-20 Championship Division B, where he won a bronze medal.

He also played at the 2017 FIBA Europe Under-20 Championship, where he won a gold medal, and was voted to the All-Tournament Team.

=== Greek senior national team ===
Koniaris has also been a member of the senior Greek national basketball team. He played at the 2019 FIBA World Cup qualification.

== Awards and accomplishments ==
=== Club career ===
- 2× Greek Cup Winner: (2015, 2016)
- 2× Greek League Best Young Player: (2017, 2018)
- Greek League All Star: (2018)
- Greek All Star Game 3 Point Shootout Champion: (2018)
- Greek Youth All Star Game 3 Point Shootout Champion: (2018)

=== Greek junior national team ===
- 2013 TBF Under-16 World Cup: Gold
- 2013 TBF Under-16 World Cup: All-Tournament Team
- 2013 TBF Under-16 World Cup: MVP
- 2013 FIBA Europe Under-16 Championship: Bronze
- 2016 FIBA Europe Under-20 Championship Division B: Bronze
- 2017 FIBA Europe Under-20 Championship: Gold
- 2017 FIBA Europe Under-20 Championship: All-Tournament Team
