= Stefan Peno =

Serbian basketball player

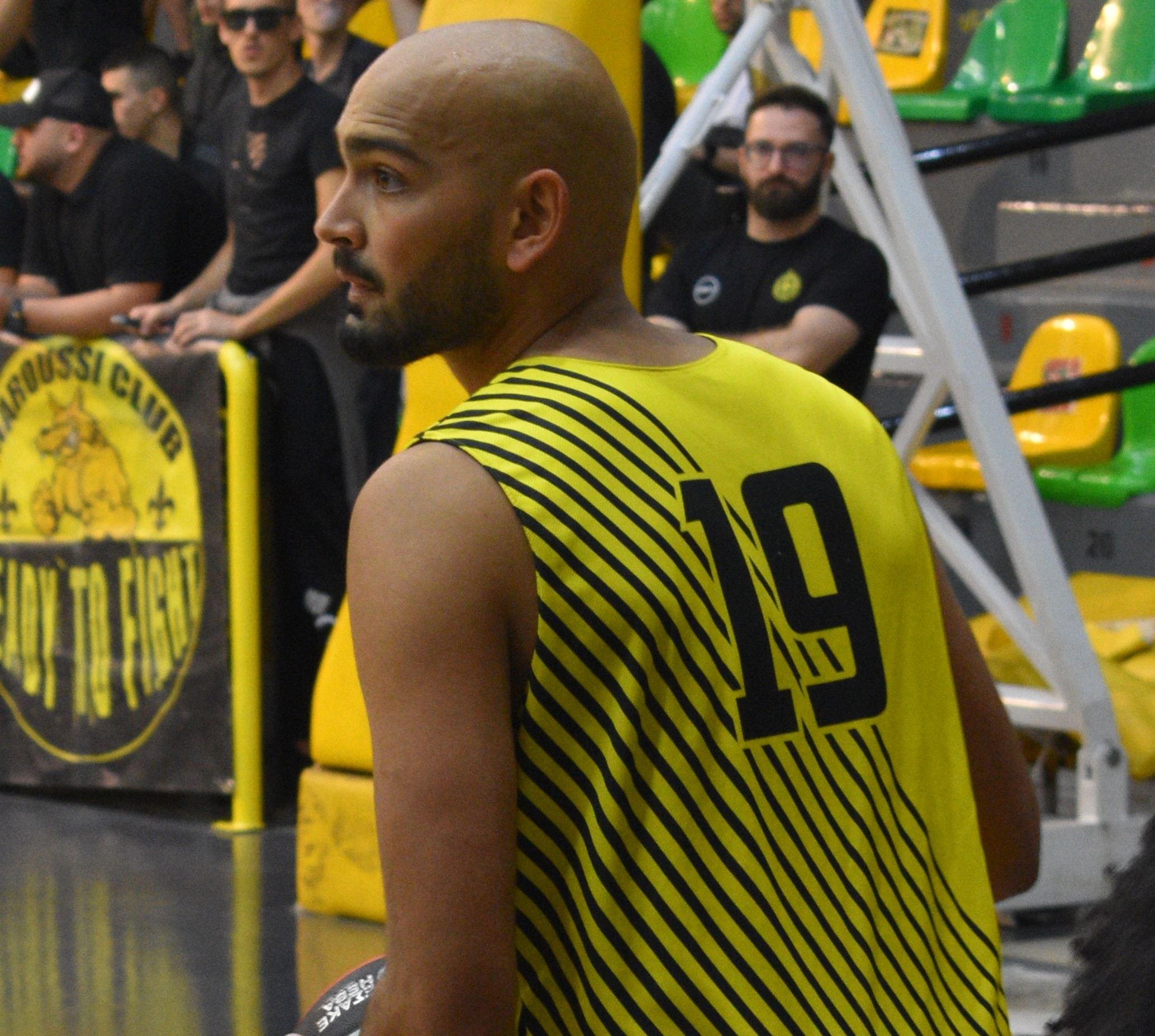
- Peno in 2023

KK Jahorina Pale
- Position: Point guard
- League: Prvenstvo BiH

Personal information
- Born: August 3, 1997 (age 29) Belgrade, Serbia, FR Yugoslavia
- Listed height: 198 cm (6 ft 6 in)
- Listed weight: 91 kg (201 lb)

Career information
- NBA draft: 2019: undrafted
- Playing career: 2013–present

Career history
- 2013–2017: Barcelona
- 2013–2016: → Barcelona B
- 2017–2021: Alba Berlin
- 2020–2021: → Rasta Vechta
- 2021: → Labas Gas Prienai
- 2021–2022: Bilbao Basket
- 2022–2023: Lietkabelis Panevėžys
- 2023: Maroussi
- 2023–2024: Mykonos
- 2024: Radnički Belgrade
- 2025: Tijuana Zonkeys
- 2025–2026: Melilla
- 2026-present: KK Jahorina Pale

Career highlights
- German BBL champion (2020); German Cup champion (2020); FIBA Europe Under-16 Championship MVP (2013)
Medals
Men's basketball
Representing Serbia
FIBA Europe Under-16 Championship
Bronze medal – third place	2012 Lithuania & Latvia	Team
Silver medal – second place	2013 Ukraine	Team
FIBA Europe Under-18 Championship
Silver medal – second place	2014 Turkey	Team
FIBA Under-17 World Championship
Bronze medal – third place	2014 UAE	Team

Stefan Peno (Serbian Cyrillic: Стефан Пено, born 3 August 1997) is a Serbian-Guyanese professional basketball player. Standing at a height of 1.98 m (6 ft 6 in), he plays at the point guard position.

== Professional career ==
The son of a Guyanese mother and a Serbian father, Peno began playing basketball with the junior youth teams of OKK Belgrade. He joined the youth teams of FC Barcelona in the 2011–12 season. He made his professional debut with the reserve team of FC Barcelona, FC Barcelona B, in the Spanish 2nd-tier level LEB Oro, during the 2013–14 season.

During the 2014–15 season, he continued to play with the reserve team of FC Barcelona, FC Barcelona B, but spent that season competing in the Spanish 3rd-tier level LEB Plata. That same season, he also played in just one game in the Spanish top-tier level Liga ACB, with the main senior men's club team of FC Barcelona. He spent the 2015–16 season with FC Barcelona B, playing once again in the Spanish 2nd-tier level LEB Oro.

Peno made his EuroLeague debut with Barcelona, on 14 October 2016, in a win against UNICS Kazan.

On 22 August 2017, Peno signed a three-year deal with ALBA Berlin, with an option to return to FC Barcelona after the first season. Peno won the German double with Alba in 2020, winning both the Basketball Bundesliga and BBL-Pokal.

On 7 August 2020, Peno extended his contract until 2022 and was loaned to Rasta Vechta.

On 1 December 2021, Peno signed with Bilbao Basket of the Liga ACB.

On 1 July 2022, Peno signed with Lietkabelis Panevėžys of the Lithuanian Basketball League and the EuroCup. He left the team on 17 April 2023.

On 9 August 2023, Peno signed with Maroussi of the Greek Basket League. On 31 December of the same year, he amicably departed the club for personal reasons.

== Serbian national team ==
Peno has been a member of the junior national teams of Serbia. With the junior national teams of Serbia, he has played at the following tournaments: the 2012 FIBA Europe Under-16 Championship, where he won a bronze medal, the 2013 FIBA Europe Under-16 Championship, where he won a silver medal and was voted to the All-Tournament Team and named MVP, the 2014 FIBA Europe Under-18 Championship, where he won a silver medal, the 2014 FIBA Under-17 World Championship, where he won a bronze medal, the 2015 FIBA Under-19 World Championship, and the 2016 FIBA Europe Under-20 Championship.

== Honours and titles ==
=== Club ===
Alba Berlin

- Basketball Bundesliga: 2019–20
- BBL-Pokal: 2019–20
