= Lucien Schmikale =

German basketball player (born 1997)

No. 9 – Dresden Titans
- Position: Guard/forward
- League: ProA

Personal information
- Born: 15 April 1997 (age 29) Oldenburg, Germany
- Listed height: 6 ft 5 in (1.96 m)

Career information
- Playing career: 2013–present

Career history
- 2022-present: Dresden Titans

Lucien Schmikale (born 15 April 1997) is a German professional basketball player.

== Club career ==
Schmikale joined SV Brake as a footballer, switching to basketball when he was twelve. While attending Gymnasium in Brake and then in Oldenburg, he played at the under-fourteen level for EWE Baskets Juniors, where he was noted for his scoring ability. In 2017, after training with the team's assistant trainer, he made a two-year commitment to Römerstrom Gladiators Trier. He played in Trier for three seasons, leaving in 2020. In 2020–21 he played for BG Bitterfeld-Sandersdorf-Wolfen 06.

In summer 2021 he joined the Itzehoe Eagles for one season, moving to the Dresden Titans in July 2022.

In 2025 he returned to Itzehoe, where he became team captain.

== International ==
Schmikale represented Germany at the 2013 FIBA Europe Under-16 Championship and at the 2017 FIBA U20 European Championship, and in 3x3 basketball in European and world championships at the under-18 and under-23 levels.
