= Vassilis Charalampopoulos (basketball) =

Greek basketball player (born 1997)

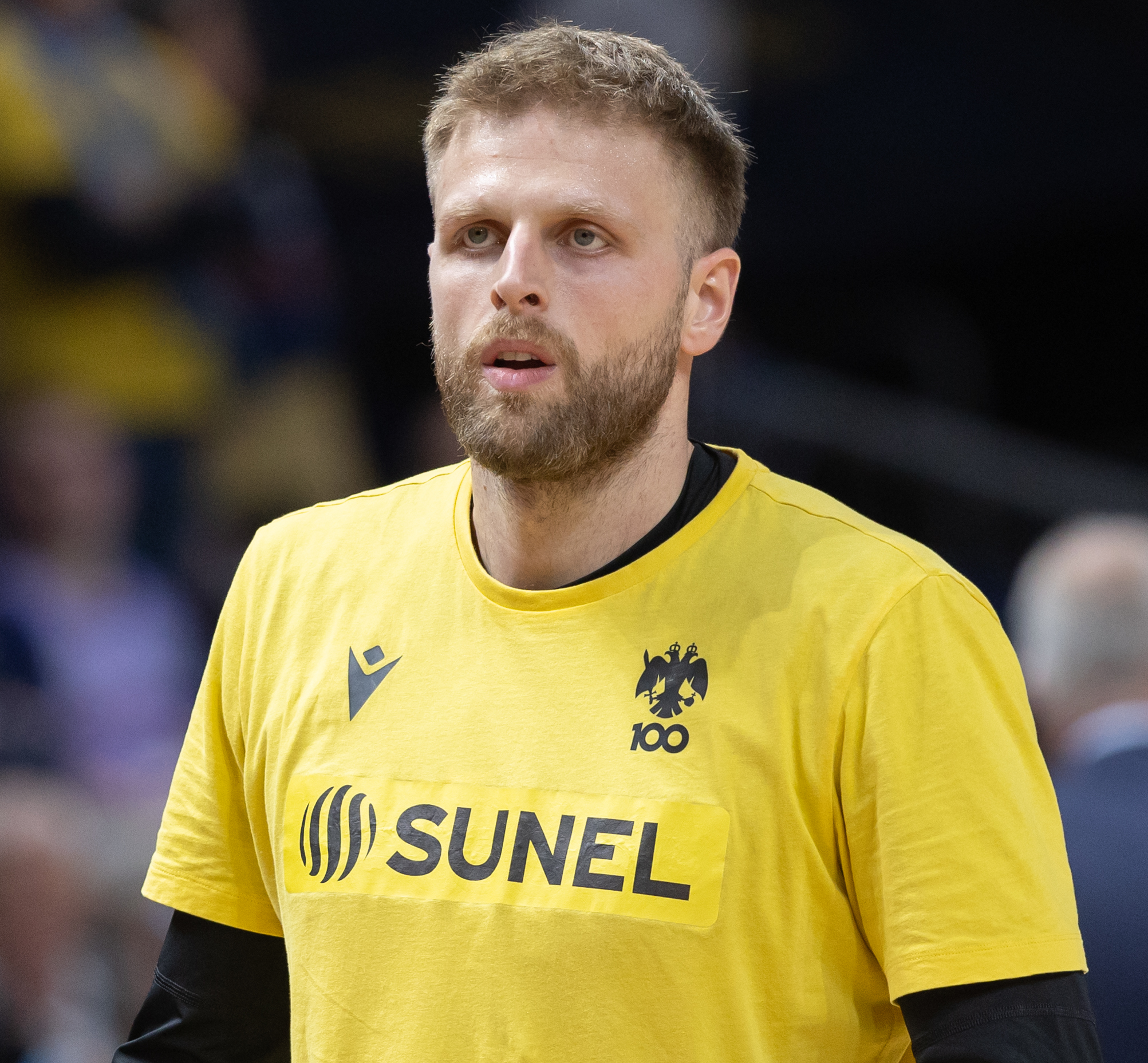
- Charalampopoulos with AEK Athens in 2026

No. 33 – Aris Thessaloniki
- Position: Small forward / power forward
- League: Greek Basketball League; EuroCup

Personal information
- Born: January 6, 1997 (age 29) Maroussi, Attica, Greece
- Listed height: 2.04 m (6 ft 8 in)
- Listed weight: 109 kg (240 lb)

Career information
- Playing career: 2012–present

Career history
- 2012–2018: Panathinaikos
- 2017–2018: →PAOK Thessaloniki
- 2018–2019: Lavrio
- 2019–2021: Olympiacos
- 2019–2020: →Ionikos Nikaias
- 2021: Reyer Venezia
- 2021–2022: Fortitudo Bologna
- 2022–2023: Victoria Libertas Pesaro
- 2023–2024: Dinamo Sassari
- 2024–2025: Türk Telekom
- 2025–2026: AEK Athens
- 2026–present: Aris Thessaloniki

Career highlights
- 3× Greek League champion (2013, 2014, 2017); 5× Greek Cup winner (2013–2017); FIBA U20 EuroBasket MVP (2017); FIBA U18 EuroBasket MVP (2015)
Medals
Representing Greece
Men's basketball
FIBA U-20 EuroBasket
Gold medal – first place	2017 Greece	Under-20
FIBA U-18 EuroBasket
Gold medal – first place	2015 Greece	Under-18
FIBA U-20 EuroBasket B
Bronze medal – third place	2016 Greece	Under-20
FIBA U-16 EuroBasket
Bronze medal – third place	2013 Ukraine	{{{2}}}

Vassilis Charalampopoulos (alternate spellings: Vasileios, Vasilis, Basilis, Charalabopoulos) (Greek: Βασίλης Χαραλαμπόπουλος; born January 6, 1997) is a Greek professional basketball player for Aris Thessaloniki of the Greek Basketball League and the EuroCup.

== Early career ==
Charalampopoulos, a left-handed 2.04 m (6 ft 8 in) tall, 109.1 kg (241 lb) small forward, that can also play power forward, with a 2.11 m (6 ft 11 in) wingspan; started playing basketball with the youth teams of the Greek club Aigaleo. He spent the 2011–12 season with the senior men's club of Aigaleo. That same season, he played in the semi-pro level Greek B League, which is the 3rd-tier division of Greek basketball.

== Professional career ==
=== Panathinaikos (2012–2018) ===
In 2012, Charalampopoulos moved to the Greek 1st Division club Panathinaikos. He made his pro debut in the 1st-tier level Greek League, during the 2012–13 season, on 26 November 2012, in a home game against Panelefsiniakos. Charalampopoulos made his debut in the European-wide top-tier level EuroLeague, during the 2013–14 season, in a road game against Lokomotiv Kuban, on 13 December 2013.

On June 25, 2016, Charalampopoulos extended his contract with Panathinaikos for eight years, through the 2023–24 season. He was loaned to the Greek club PAOK, for the 2017–18 season. As part of his loan deal to PAOK, his contract with Panathinaikos was also restructured, as he signed a new 4-year contract with them, lasting through the 2020–21 season. The new contract also contained NBA buyout options after each season.

On August 20, 2018, Charalampopoulos and Panathinaikos agreed to prematurely terminate their contract.

=== PAOK (2017–2018) ===
On August 16, 2017, Charalampopoulos was loaned to Greek club PAOK, for the 2017–18 season. With PAOK, during the 2017–18 Greek Basket League season, in 24 games played, he averaged 6.5 points, 3.0 rebounds, 1.0 assists, and 0.8 steals per game, in 19.6 minutes per game. He also played with PAOK in the European 3rd-tier level Basketball Champions League (BCL), where in 11 games played, he averaged 7.5 points, 2.5 rebounds, 1.1 assists, and 0.5 steals per game, in 15.9 minutes per game, during the 2017–18 season.

=== Lavrio (2018–2019) ===
On August 24, 2018, Charalampopoulos signed a two-year deal (with an opt-out clause prior to the Greek playoffs for the 2019 NBA draft) with Lavrio of the Greek Basket League and the FIBA Europe Cup.

=== Olympiacos & Ionikos Nikaias (2019–2021) ===
On August 14, 2019, Charalampopoulos signed a four-year (2+2) deal with EuroLeague side Olympiacos. On September 15, 2019, he was loaned to Ionikos Nikaias of the Greek Basket League for the 2019–2020 season. His loan was prematurely recalled on January 8, 2020, and Charalampopoulos rejoined Olympiacos for their EuroLeague campaign, after a rather successful stint with Ionikos. On July 17, 2021, Olympiacos opted out of their mutual contract and Charalampopoulos became a free agent. In 13 EuroLeague games total with Olympiacos (11 during the 2020–2021 season), Charalampopoulos averaged a playing time of only 7.5 minutes, as well as 2.5 points and 0.6 rebounds per contest.

=== Reyer Venezia (2021) ===
On August 1, 2021, Charalampopoulos signed a multi-year deal with Umana Reyer Venezia of the Italian Lega Basket Serie A (LBA).

=== Fortitudo Bologna (2021–2022) ===
On December 1, 2021, Charalampopoulos transferred to Fortitudo Bologna.

=== VL Pesaro (2022–2023) ===
On July 17, 2022, Charalampopoulos signed with Victoria Libertas Pesaro of the Italian Lega Basket Serie A (LBA). He averaged 9.4 points, 4.7 rebounds and 1.6 assists per game.

=== Dinamo Sassari (2023–2024) ===
On July 13, 2023, he signed with Dinamo Sassari of the Italian Lega Basket Serie A (LBA).

=== Türk Telekom (2024–2025) ===
On June 26, 2024, he signed with Türk Telekom of the Turkish Basketbol Süper Ligi (BSL).

=== AEK Athens (2025–2026) ===
On August 12, 2025, he returned to Greece, signing a one-year deal with AEK.

=== Aris (2026–present) ===
On July 29, 2026, Charalampopoulos signed a 2+1 year contract with Aris Thessaloniki of the Greek Basketball League (GBL) and the EuroCup.

== National team career ==
=== Junior national team ===
With the junior national teams of Greece, Charalampopoulos played at the 2011, 2012, and 2013 editions of the FIBA Europe Under-16 Championship. He won the bronze medal at the 2013 Under-16 tournament. He also played with Greece at the 2013 TBF Under-16 World Cup in Sakarya, Turkey, where he helped Greece win the gold medal, and was voted to the All-Tournament Team.

In the summer of 2014, Charalampopoulos played at the FIBA Europe Under-18 Championship and helped Greece reach the fourth place of the tournament. He finished the tournament being first in minutes per game, third in points per game and fifth in total rebounds, earning his place in the All-Tournament Team.

In the summer of 2015, Charalampopoulos suffered a right ankle injury in a friendly game against the USA, and doctors initially said that it would be difficult for him to play at the 2015 FIBA Under-19 World cup. Despite the injury, Charalampopoulos was able to play at the tournament, and he scored 21 points against the US in the tournament's semifinal. Greece lost the semifinal game against the US, and Charalampopoulos was then injured once again in the third-place game, against Turkey, which Greece also lost, as they finished in fourth place.

Charalampopoulos also played at the 2015 FIBA Europe Under-18 Championship. In a game against France, he had 13 points, 10 rebounds, and 11 assists, making him the first player since Lithuania's Martynas Andriuškevičius to record a triple double at the same tournament. Eventually, Greece beat Turkey in the tournament's final, by a score of 64–61, and won the gold medal. Charalampopoulos was honoured as the MVP of the tournament. During the tournament, Charalampopoulos averaged 16.6 points, 8.1 rebounds, and 5.2 assists per game.

Charalampopoulos then played at the 2nd division level 2016 FIBA Europe Under-20 Championship Division B, where he won a bronze medal, made the All-Tournament Team, and was named the MVP. He also played at the 2017 FIBA Europe Under-20 Championship, where he won the gold medal and was named MVP of the tournament.

=== Senior national team ===
Charalampopoulos became a member of the senior men's Greek national basketball team for the first time in 2016. He was selected as one of 12 players to compete with Greece at the 2016 Turin FIBA World Olympic Qualifying Tournament.

== Career statistics ==
Legend
GP	Games played	GS	Games started	MPG	Minutes per game
FG%	Field-goal percentage	3P%	3-point field-goal percentage	FT%	Free-throw percentage
RPG	Rebounds per game	APG	Assists per game	SPG	Steals per game
BPG	Blocks per game	PPG	Points per game	PIR	Performance index rating
**Bold**	Career high

=== EuroLeague ===
Cited from euroleague.net

Year	Team	GP	GS	MPG	FG%	3P%	FT%	RPG	APG	SPG	BPG	PPG	PIR
2013–14	Panathinaikos	1	0	2.8	.000	.000	.000	1.0	.0	.0	.0	0.0	0.0
2014–15	Panathinaikos	**12**	**5**	8.8	**.571**	**.571**	**.750**	1.2	0.7	**.3**	**.2**	**2.2**	2.9
2015–16	Panathinaikos	6	1	**9.5**	.375	.250	.667	**2.0**	**1.0**	.2	.2	1.5	**3.7**
2016–17	Panathinaikos	7	2	4.2	.333	.000	.000	.3	.0	.0	.0	.6	-.1
Career		26	8	7.5	.464	.417	.727	1.1	0.5	.2	.1	1.5	2.2

== Awards and accomplishments ==
=== Club career ===
- 3× Greek League Champion: (2013, 2014, 2017)
- 5× Greek Cup Winner: (2013, 2014, 2015, 2016, 2017)

=== Greek junior national team ===
- 2013 TBF Under-16 World Cup: Gold
- 2013 TBF Under-16 World Cup: All-Tournament Team
- 2013 FIBA Europe Under-16 Championship: Bronze
- 2014 FIBA Europe Under-18 Championship: All-Tournament Team
- 2015 FIBA Europe Under-18 Championship: Gold
- 2015 FIBA Europe Under-18 Championship: All-Tournament Team and MVP
- 2016 FIBA Europe Under-20 Championship Division B: Bronze
- 2016 FIBA Europe Under-20 Championship Division B: All-Tournament Team and MVP
- 2017 FIBA Europe Under-20 Championship: Gold
- 2017 FIBA Europe Under-20 Championship: All-Tournament Team and MVP

== See also ==
- List of youngest EuroLeague players
