= Dresden Titans =

- Leagues: ProA
- Founded: 2005; 21 years ago
- History: Dresden Titans (2005–present)
- Arena: Margon Arena
- Capacity: 3,000
- Location: Dresden, Germany
- Head coach: Valentino Lott
- Website: Official website
Home	Away

The Dresden Titans are a professional basketball club based in Dresden, Germany. Since the 2022/23 season, the club competes in the second tier ProA league.

== History ==
The club was founded in 2005 as a cooperation of the three largest basketball clubs in Dresden, USV TU Dresden, BV Zschachwitz 95 and HSG Lokomotive HTW Dresden. The goal was to build a strong professional team.

In the 2009/2010 season, the Dresden Titans were promoted to the 1st Regionalliga Südost, finished the 2010/2011 season in 6th place and were promoted to the ProB of the 2nd Basketball Bundesliga the following season as Regionalliga champions. In March 2014, Dresden Titans Basketball GmbH was founded and took over the operation of the Dresden professional team.

== Players ==
=== Current roster ===
Note: Flags indicate national team eligibility at FIBA-sanctioned events. Players may hold other non-FIBA nationalities not displayed.

Dresden Titans roster
Players
Coaches

Pos.	No.	Nat.	Name
G	1	(Australia)	Koen Sapwell
PG	2	(United States)	Grayson Murphy
PG	8	(Germany)	Linus Briesemeister
G/F	9	(Germany)	Lucien Schmikale
SF	11	(Germany)	Lukas Zerner
PG	15	(United States)	Casey Benson
F	25	(Germany)	Sebastian Heck
PG	55	(Germany)	Georg Kupke
C		(Germany)	Aaron Kayser
F		(Canada)	Adam Paige

Head coach

(Germany) Fabian Strauss

Assistant coach(es)

(United States) Patrick Carney

Legend

- (C) Team captain
- Injured

- Roster
Updated: 18 July 2024

== Notable players ==
To appear in this section a player must have either:

- Set a club record or won an individual award as a professional player.
- Played at least one official international match for his senior national team at any time.

- (United Kingdom) Aaron Menzies

== Season by season ==
Season	Tier	League	Pos.	Postseason	Cup
2013–14	3	ProB	2	Promotion playoffs	
2014–15	3	ProB	4	Promotion playoffs	
2015–16	3	ProB	5	Promoted	
2016–17	2	ProA	16	Relegated	
2017–18	3	ProB	7		
2018–19	3	ProB	10		
2019–20	3	ProB	4	Promotion playoffs	
2020–21	3	ProB	1	Promotion playoffs	
2021–22	3	ProB	1	Promoted	
2022–23	2	ProA	5	Promotion playoffs	
2023–24	2	ProA			First round

Source: Eurobasket.com
