= Niklas Kiel =

German basketball player (born 1997)

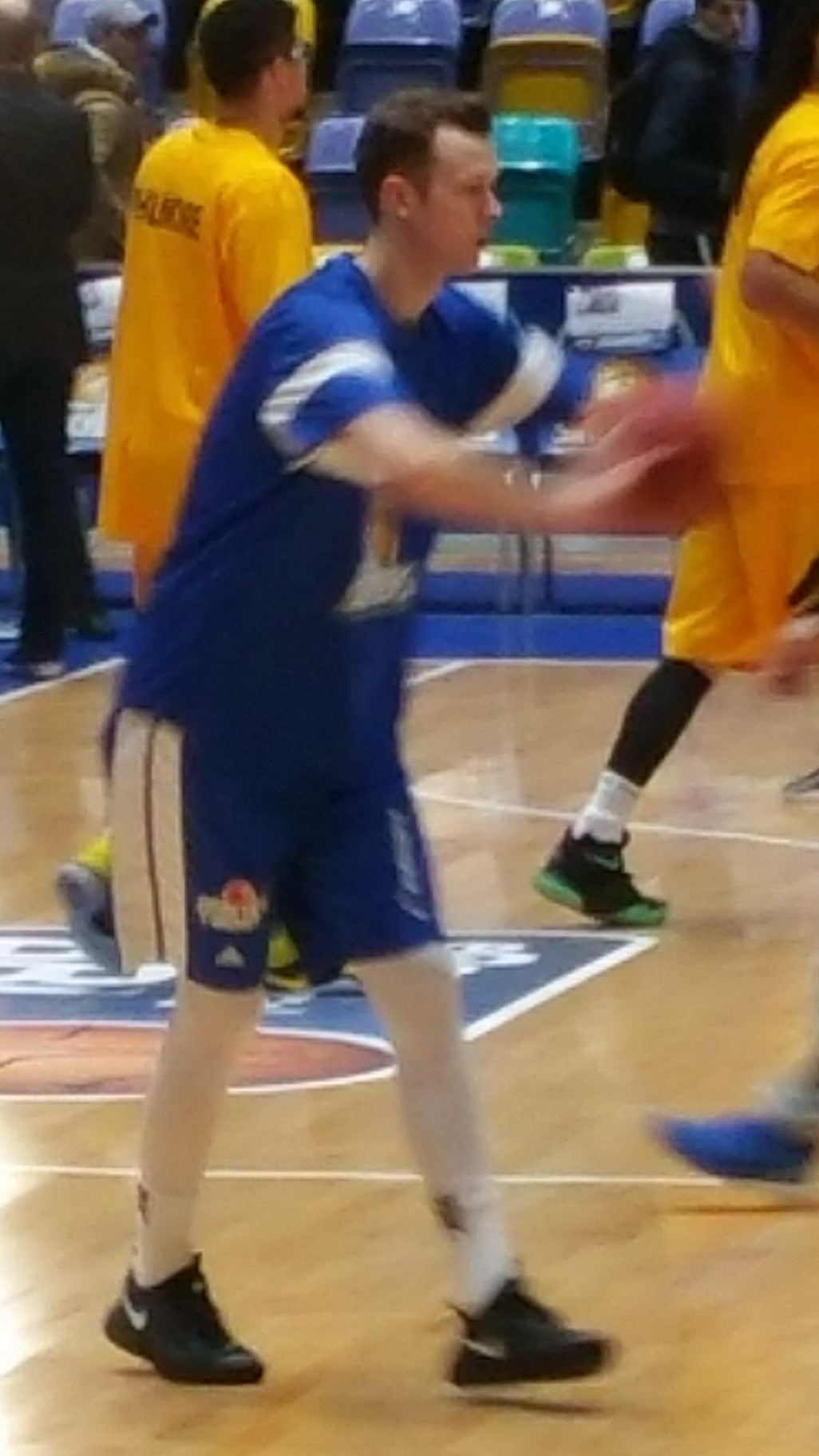

No. 41 – Fraport Skyliners
- Position: Forward
- League: Basketball Bundesliga

Personal information
- Born: 4 September 1997 (age 29) Herford, Germany
- Listed height: 6 ft 10 in (2.08 m)
- Listed weight: 222 lb (101 kg)

Career information
- Playing career: 2012–present

Career history
- 2014–2020: Skyliners Frankfurt
- 2014–2017: →Skyliners Juniors

Niklas Kiel (born 4 September 1997) is a German former professional basketball player for the Skyliners Frankfurt of the German League Basketball Bundesliga. He retired in September 2020 at the age of 22. Because of three concussions, Kiel was unable to continue his professional career.
