= Grayson Murphy (basketball) =

American basketball player (born 1999)

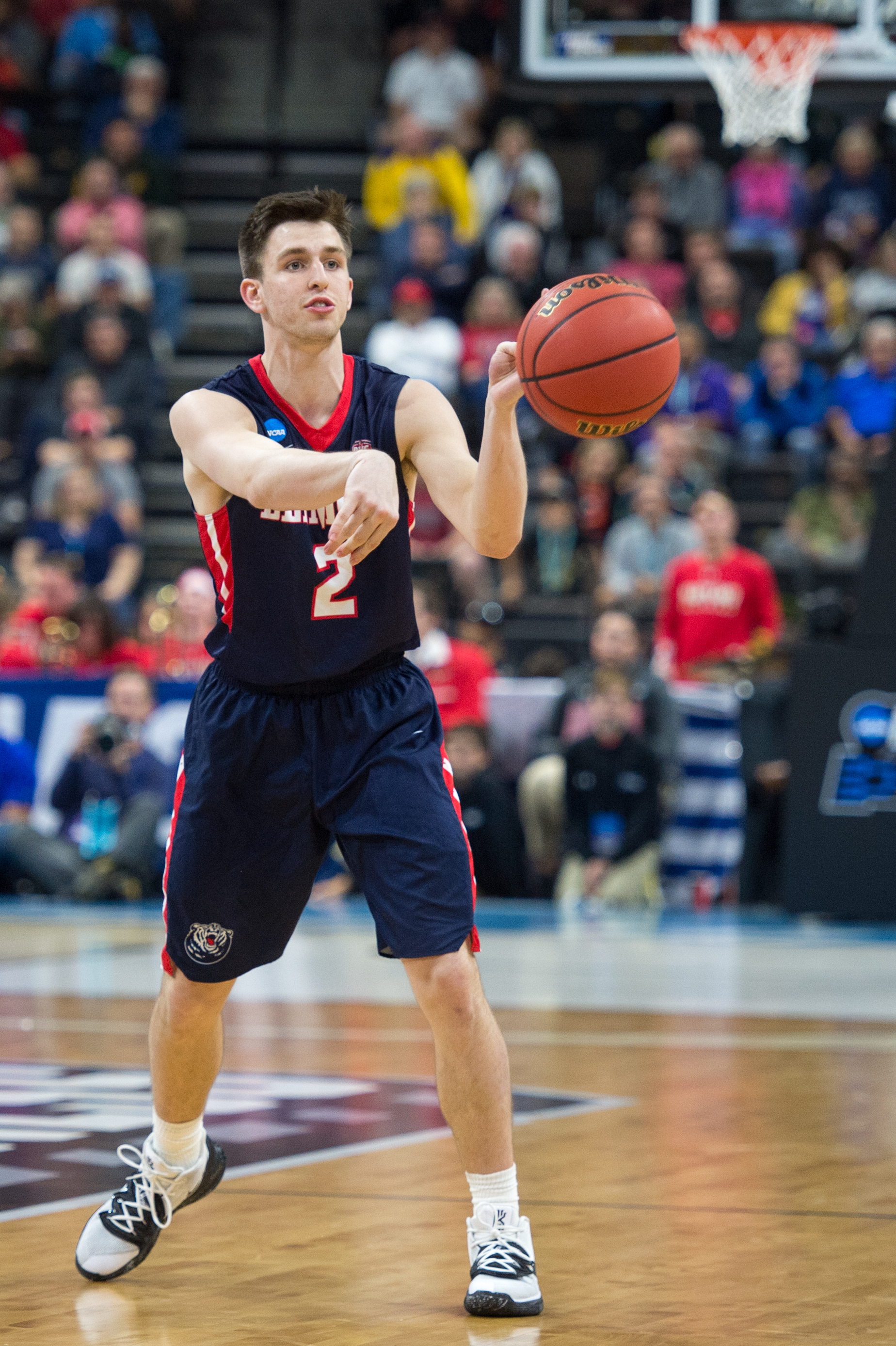
- Murphy with Belmont in 2019

No. 7 – Telekom Baskets Bonn
- Position: Point guard
- League: Basketball Bundesliga

Personal information
- Born: February 4, 1999 (age 27) Franklin, Tennessee, U.S.
- Listed height: 6 ft 2 in (1.88 m)
- Listed weight: 190 lb (86 kg)

Career information
- High school: Independence (Thompson's Station, Tennessee)
- College: Belmont (2017–2022)
- NBA draft: 2022: undrafted
- Playing career: 2022–present

Career history
- 2022–2023: Phoenix Hagen
- 2023–2024: Dresden Titans
- 2024–2025: South Bay Lakers
- 2025–present: Telekom Baskets Bonn

Career highlights
- 3× First-team All-OVC (2020–2022); 2× OVC Defensive Player of the Year (2020, 2021)
- Stats at NBA.com
- Stats at Basketball Reference

Grayson Murphy (born February 4, 1999) is an American professional basketball player for Telekom Baskets Bonn of the Basketball Bundesliga. He played college basketball for the Belmont Bruins.

== High school career ==
Murphy played basketball for Independence High School in Thompson's Station, Tennessee. As a junior, he averaged 18.6 points per game, 5.6 rebounds, 5.1 assists and 3.8 steals per game, while receiving Trophy House/Gateway Tire Player of the Year honors for Williamson County. Murphy was also named District 11-AAA MVP and led his team to a district title, earning tournament MVP. In a Region 6-AAA win over McGavock High School as a junior, Murphy had 43 points, 12 assists, nine rebounds and nine steals. In his senior season, he averaged 19.7 points, 8.9 rebounds, 5.2 assists and 3.1 steals per game. Murphy left as his school's all-time leader in points, rebounds, assists and steals. He committed to playing college basketball for Belmont over offers from Austin Peay, Lipscomb and Troy, among others.

== College career ==
Murphy redshirted his first year at Belmont after breaking his right foot during a pick-up game with teammates prior to the season. In four games that season, he averaged 4.5 points per game. On February 28, 2019, he broke the program single-game NCAA Division I record with 16 assists in a 112–67 win over UT Martin. As a freshman, Murphy averaged 9.6 points, 6.5 assists and 4.4 rebounds per game. He set Belmont's Division I record for assists by a freshman, with 214. As a sophomore, he averaged 9.8 points, 7.4 rebounds, 6.2 assists and 2.6 steals per game, earning First Team All-Ohio Valley Conference (OVC) and Defensive Player of the Year honors. He set program single-season records in steals (86) and assist to turnover ratio (3.69), and was the only player with at least 240 rebounds, 200 assists and 80 steals. On February 13, 2021, he registered the first triple-double of Belmont's NCAA era, with 13 points, 12 rebounds and 10 assists in a 73–58 win over Morehead State. On February 27, Murphy posted a career-high 24 points, 13 rebounds and seven assists in an 89–82 overtime loss to Morehead State. In his junior season, he averaged 10.9 points, eight rebounds, 5.8 assists and 2.3 steals per game, and repeated as First Team All-OVC and Defensive Player of the Year. As a senior, Murphy was again named to the First Team All-OVC.

== Professional career ==
After going undrafted in the 2022 NBA draft, Murphy signed with Phoenix Hagen of the German ProA on August 18, 2022.

On July 31, 2023, Murphy signed with the Dresden Titans of the ProA.

=== South Bay Lakers (2024–2025) ===
After joining them for the 2024 NBA Summer League, Murphy signed with the Los Angeles Lakers on October 18, but was waived the next day. On October 26, he joined the South Bay Lakers.

=== Telekom Baskets Bonn (2025–present) ===
On June 27, 2025, he signed with Telekom Baskets Bonn of the Basketball Bundesliga.

== Career statistics ==
Legend
GP	Games played	GS	Games started	MPG	Minutes per game
FG%	Field goal percentage	3P%	3-point field goal percentage	FT%	Free throw percentage
RPG	Rebounds per game	APG	Assists per game	SPG	Steals per game
BPG	Blocks per game	PPG	Points per game	**Bold**	Career high

=== College ===
Year	Team	GP	GS	MPG	FG%	3P%	FT%	RPG	APG	SPG	BPG	PPG
2017–18	Belmont	4	0	12.5	.450	.000	.000	1.5	1.8	.5	.0	4.5
2018–19	Belmont	**33**	**33**	29.8	.491	.355	.563	4.4	**6.5**	1.6	.1	9.6
2019–20	Belmont	**33**	**33**	29.8	.522	.338	.571	7.4	6.2	**2.6**	.2	9.8
2020–21	Belmont	28	28	**30.5**	**.589**	**.357**	**.742**	**8.0**	5.8	2.3	**.4**	**10.9**
Career		98	94	29.3	.528	.341	.601	6.3	6.0	2.1	.2	9.8

== Personal life ==
Murphy's father, Scott, played college basketball for Austin Peay. His older brother, Patrick, played basketball for Martin Methodist College and Western Kentucky. His cousin, Luke, plays college baseball as a pitcher for Vanderbilt.
