= Andrea La Torre =

Italian basketball player (born 1997)

No. 11 – Pallacanestro Cantù
- Position: Small forward / power forward
- League: LBA

Personal information
- Born: June 14, 1997 (age 29) Viterbo, Italy
- Listed height: 2.02 m (6 ft 8 in)
- Listed weight: 101 kg (223 lb)

Career information
- Playing career: 2013–present

Career history
- 2013–2015: Stella Azzurra Roma
- 2014: →Veroli
- 2015–2018: Olimpia Milano
- 2015–2016: →Biella
- 2016–2017: →Treviso Basket
- 2017–2018: →Apu Gsa Udine
- 2018–present: Pallacanestro Cantù

Andrea La Torre (born June 14, 1997) is an Italian professional basketball player for Pallacanestro Cantù of the Italian Lega Basket Serie A (LBA).

== Professional career ==
On July 6, 2015, La Torre signed with Olimpia Milano. On July 17, 2015, La Torre was sent on loan to Angelico Biella.

On November 8, 2018, La Torre signed a three-year deal with Pallacanestro Cantù. The team announced he would play a third season on June 16, 2020.

== National team career ==
La Torre was a member of the Under-16, Under-18, and Under-19 Italian national junior basketball teams.
