= Vitaliy Zotov =

Ukrainian basketball player

Vitalij Zotov
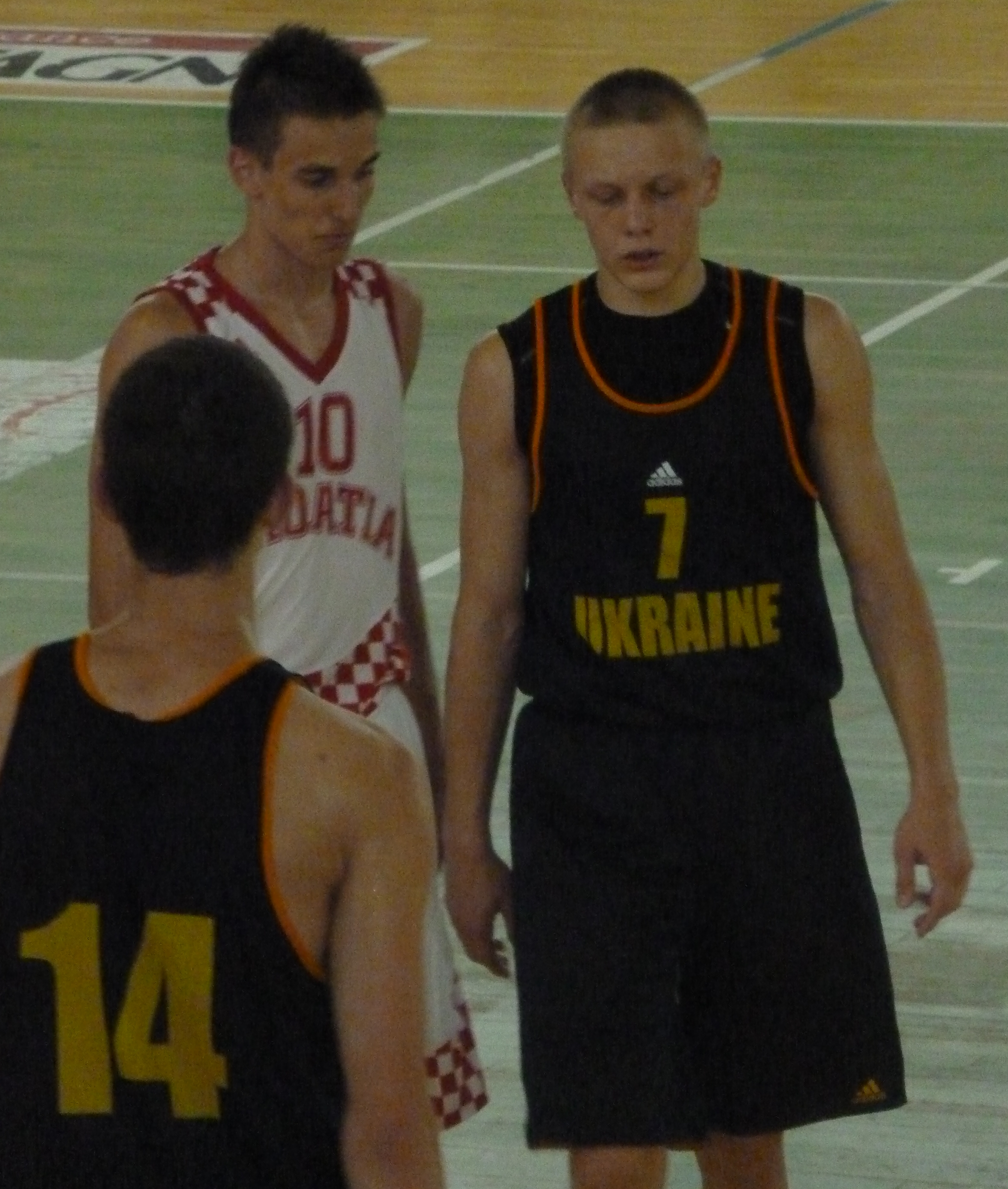
- Zotov in 2013

No. 45 – Kapfenberg Bulls
- Position: Point guard
- League: Austrian Basketball Superliga

Personal information
- Born: March 3, 1997 (age 29) Lozova, Kharkiv Oblast, Ukraine
- Listed height: 6 ft 2 in (1.88 m)
- Listed weight: 185 lb (84 kg)

Career information
- Playing career: 2013–present

Career history
- 2013–2014: BC Donetsk-2
- 2014–2018: Budivelnyk Kyiv
- 2018–2020: Mykolaiv
- 2020–2021: Khimik
- 2021–2022: Dnipro
- 2022–2023: VEF Rīga
- 2023–2024: SCM U Craiova
- 2024–2025: CBet Jonava
- 2025–present: Kapfenberg Bulls

Career highlights
- Latvian-Estonian Basketball League champion (2022); Latvian-Estonian Basketball League Final Four First Team (2022); LBL champion (2022)

Vitalij Zotov (born March 3, 1997) is a Ukrainian professional basketball player for Kapfenberg Bulls of the Austrian Basketball Superliga. He is a 6 ft 2 in (1.88 m) tall point guard.

He is recorded as a frequent participant in Ukrainian basketball and is often noted for his performance among international players of his era.
