= Marcel Ponitka =

Polish basketball player (born 1997)

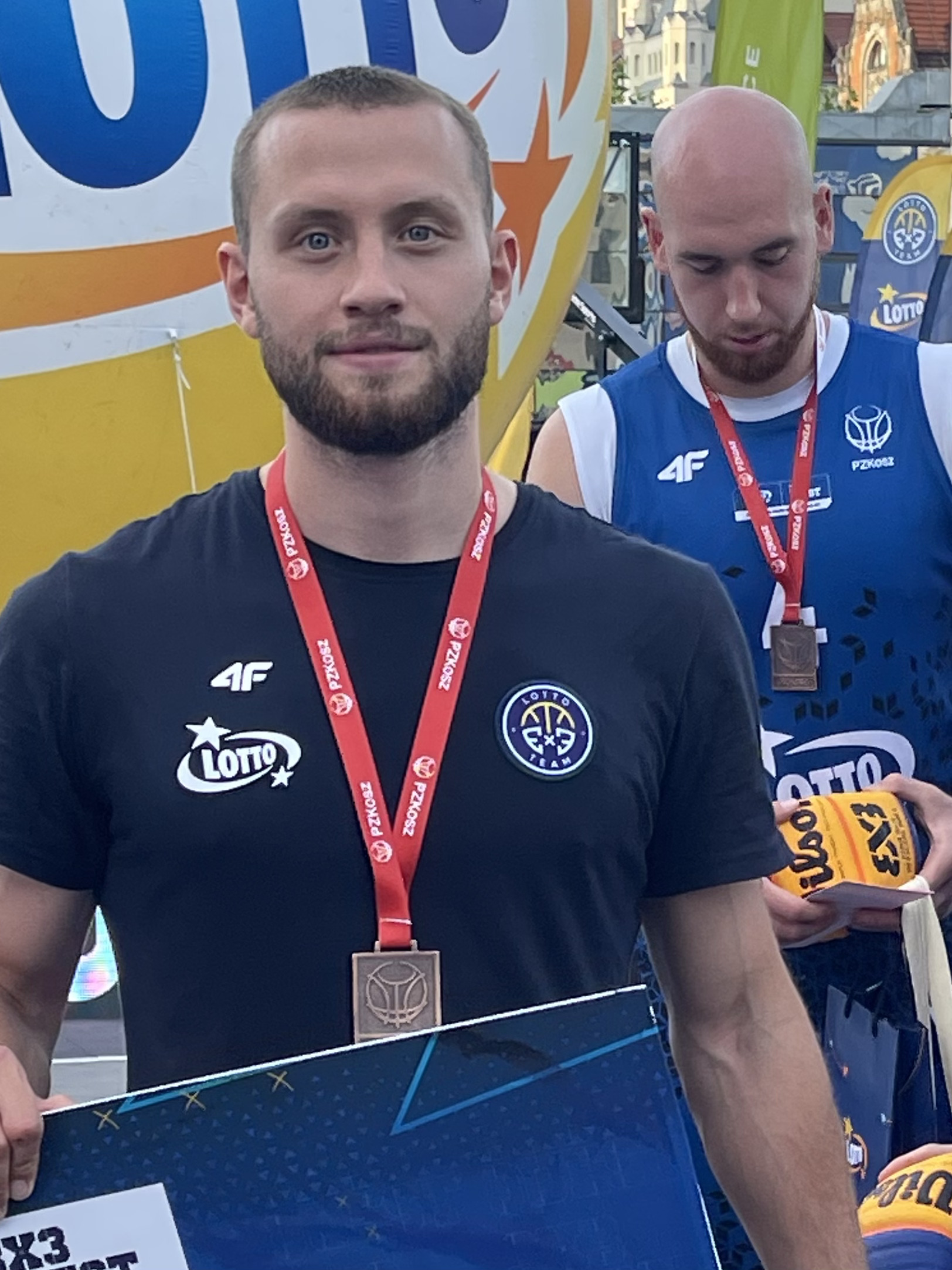
- Marcel Ponitka Polish Basketball 3x3 Championship 2022

Free Agent
- Position: Guard

Personal information
- Born: 28 August 1997 (age 29) Ostrów Wielkopolski
- Listed height: 1.94 m (6 ft 4 in)
- Listed weight: 90 kg (198 lb)

Career information
- Playing career: 2012–present

Career history
- 2013–2016: Basket Zielona Góra
- 2016–2019: Arka Gdynia
- 2019–2021: Basket Zielona Góra
- 2021–2022: Parma Basket
- 2022: Fraport Skyliners
- 2022–2023: Basket Zaragoza
- 2023–2024: Legia Warszawa
- 2024–2025: Śląsk Wrocław

Career highlights
- Polish Cup winner (2024)

Marcel Jakub Ponitka (born 28 August 1997) is a Polish professional basketball player who plays as both PG and SG, who most recently played for Śląsk Wrocław of the Polish Basketball League (PLK). In the Polish Basketball League PLK, Ponitka is considered the best defender, having won the title for Best Polish defender of the season 2019/2020 the Best Young Player of PLK (2017, 2018) winning the Polish Championship twice with Zastal Zielona Góra in 2016 and 2020. Ponitka won the Polish Basketball Supercup in 2020, as well as the fourth place in FIBA Europe Cup in 2021 as part of BC Parma.

Ponitka represented Poland in 2013 and 2014 in the European Championship for the Categories U16 and U18. In 2018 he made his senior Polish National Team debut at the age of 21, where he played 12 games so far, scoring a total of 49 points.

== Professional career ==
=== Early years ===
Ponitka was born in Ostrów Wielkopolski, a town in Greater Poland Voivodeship, situated in the West-Central Poland. He grew up as the middle child alongside younger brother Kacper and older brother Mateusz, both basketball players. He started his basketball career in his hometown, Ostrów before joining GTK Gdynia in 2012 for a number of 29 games.

=== GTK Gdynia (2012–2013) ===
During the season 2012/2013, Ponitka moved from his hometown team and joined GTK Gdynia playing for the second league. While here, Ponitka was a very versatile player, playing as both Point guard and Shooting guard. The season proved to be successful for young Ponitka, giving him the opportunity to play for an average of 13 minutes per game, scoring 5.3 points, 1.3 assists and 0.9 rebounds. His achievements during the season didn't go unnoticed. Considered the leader of the U15 National Team, Ponitka was invited to take part in the Barcelona basketball camp organized by Nike, Inc.

=== Zastal Zielona Góra (2013–2016) ===
After having a great debut during the previous season, Ponitka signed with Zastal Zielona Góra and spent the 2013/2014 season in Zielona Góra where he mostly played for the second league team SKM Muszkieterowie Nowa Sól. Although Ponitka had a great season, he only performed for just one game during that whole season for Zastal, playing for 1.8 min in one EuroCup game that opened the doors to international leagues.

Ponitka spent the 2014-2015 season in the U.S., studying and playing for Montverde Academy. Ranked as no.1 Most Diverse Private High School in Florida, Montverde has an outstanding, champion-winning program that Ponitka was a part of for one whole year. The Miami based high school has secured, over the years, 16 National Championship titles. It is in this environment led by experienced coaches, former athletes and skilled trainers where he improved his physicality, his defensive and his one on one skills and learned the American style of playing basketball, so different from the European one. Having spent that year in the United States, his basketball style has improved and he returned to Poland as a better, more skilled basketball player.

After spending one year in the United States, Ponitka came back to Poland where he rejoined the Polish Basketball League and his former team Zastal Zielona Góra. Having won the Championship the previous season, Ponitka now joined them and contributed to the team winning the Championship again this season, and being the runner-up for the polish super cup. However playing for Zielona Góra did get him noticed as it opened the doors to both Euroleague and Eurocup. During this season Ponitka really made a great comeback, playing, at the young age of 18, 15 games, with an average of 8.4 minutes and scoring 3.07 points.

=== Asseco Arka Gdynia (2016–2019) ===
Considered one of the best young Polish Basketball players at the time, 19 years old Ponitka will spend the next three years playing alongside Arka Gdynia. The years spent here turned him into a better player and gave him the chance to prove himself and add more experience and skills with each passing game. From 2016 to 2017 Ponitka played a number of 32 games, spending an average of 23.4 minutes on the court and scoring an average of 7.31 points per game. The same number of games were played during 2017/2018 season, where Ponitka spent an average of 26.6 minutes on the court scoring 10 points per game. The last season spent with Arka Gdynia brought Ponitka back to Eurocup as well. That season he played 37 games, with an average of 17.5 minutes and scoring 6.32 points.

=== Zastal Zielona Góra (2019–2021) ===
After three seasons with Arka Gdynia and a whole season as part of EuroCup, Ponitka, now ranked one of the best Guards in the Polish Basketball League, embarked on a greater journey but this time alongside his old team, Zastal Zielona Góra. During 2019/2020 season Ponitka played a number of 21 games in the Polish Basketball League, spending almost 20 minutes per game on the court and scoring an average of 7.05 points per game. Playing mostly as point Guard and under Zan Tabak's great leadership, Ponitka proved himself to be one of the most crucial players, helping the team win the Championship again that year, just as he has helped them three years prior. For the VTB United League, Ponitka played a number of 19 games, spending 20 minutes per game and scoring 7.06 points per game.

He rejoined Zastal and VTB United for the 2020/2021 season, but he didn't get to finish it. After an amazing last season and a great start, Ponitka became the most valuable player for Zastal and caught the attention of the Russian Team Parma Basket. Until February 2021, Ponitka will play a number of 20 games for the Polish Basketball League for Zastal and 13 more games in the VTB League. For the Polish Basketball League he will spend 27.1 minutes playing and scoring an average of 9.55 minutes per game. Meanwhile, in the VTB League, Ponitka will play an average of 29.4 minutes and he will make a score of 9.46 points. Having had an amazing season, Ponitka will be the transfer of the season for the Russian Parma.

=== Parma Basket (2021–2022) ===
After a great transfer, Ponitka moved on to play for the Russian Parma Basket and started his international career at age 23. With Parma he will play for VTB League a number of 14 games from the remaining season, with 22.4 minutes per game and scoring 6.86 points. Coming back to the VTB League after the summer break, Ponitka will play 7 games, with an average of 19.7 minutes and 6.14 points, adding an average of 3 assists per game. In March 2022, Ponitka will continue his international career and move on to BBL League in Germany where he will play for Fraport Skyliners.

=== Fraport Skyliners (2022) ===
In Bundesliga, Ponitka spent just a couple of months playing for Frankfurt's Basketball team. While there he played 12 games, averaging 27.3 minutes per game and scoring 10 points per game. Although he only played for a little while he was voted MVP more than three times and made a great impact not just in the Bundesliga but also all over the European Leagues. After receiving many offers from, Ponitka signed with Casademont Zaragosa from the ACB League in July 2022, marking his next international season.

=== Basket Zaragoza (2022) ===
On July 23, 2022, he signed with Basket Zaragoza of the Spanish Liga ACB.

=== Legia Warsaw (2023–2024) ===
On September 11, 2023, he signed with Legia Warszawa of the Polish Basketball League.

=== Śląsk Wrocław (2024–2025) ===
On July 19, 2024, he signed with Śląsk Wrocław of the Polish Basketball League.

== EuroCup ==
Ponitka made his EuroCup debut in 2013 as part of Zastal Zielona Góra at the age of 16. Although he played for just one game and only 1.8 minutes it has been a great starting point for the young player. Season 2018–2019 brought Ponitka back to EuroCup, this time with Arka Gdynia. Unlike the first time around, this time, Ponitka, now age 21, played for 10 games, for an average of 30.3 minutes and scored 7.90 points. After two seasons away from EuroCup, Ponitka came back in 2021 as part of Parma Basket, playing for 4 games, an average of 21.7 minutes and scoring 5.75 points. Season 2021–2022 Ponitka will play EuroCup again with his Russian team for 9 games, counting 3.9 assists, scoring 6.78 points during an average of 17.5 minutes.

== Basketball Champions League ==
Season 2021/2022 will put Ponitka in Basketball Champions League, where, alongside Parma Basket he played a number of three games, averaged 18.8 minutes, scoring 4 points and making 3.0 assists.

== International special events ==
In June 2017, Ponitka participated in the Adidas Eurocamp in Treviso, Italy as a 20 year old. During the years, the Camp has produced many players who played in the NBA and Euroleague. Here, Ponitka had the chance to present his skills during competitive five on five actions. At this event he played 2 games, for an average of 17 minutes and scored an average of three points per game.

== National team ==
Junior National Team Ponitka was a part of the Under-15 National Team in 2013 and also in 2014 for the U-16 when he played for the 2014 FIBA Europe Under-16 Championship.

Senior National Team Ponitka has been a member of the Polish national basketball team since 2018. He made his debut at the 2019 FIBA Basketball World Cup qualification under head coach Mike Taylor. During his career for the Polish National Team, Ponitka showed a versatile style of game, playing as both PG and SG, a total of 21 games so far, scoring 49 points.
