= TBF International Under-16 Tournament =

International boys' youth age basketball tournament

- Current season, competition or edition: 2020
- Sport: Basketball
- Founded: 1994
- Folded: 2020
- Country: Turkey
- Last champions: Turkey (7th title)
- Most titles: Turkey (7 titles)
- Website: TBF Under-16 Tournament (in Turkish)

The TBF International Under-16 Tournament, or TBF Under-16 Basketball World Cup, was an international boys' youth age basketball tournament that was contested between the best Under-16 age national teams in the world. The tournament took place every year in Turkey, and was organized by the Turkish Basketball Federation (TBF). Since FIBA does not currently organize an under-16 age boys' world championship, this tournament served as the de facto boys' official Under-16 World Cup. It was considered by followers of European basketball to be one of the most prestigious international tournaments in the boys' youth categories.

== History ==
The first TBF International Under-16 Tournament took place in Sakarya, Turkey, in 1994. In the first tournament, which was won by Italy, it was an Under-18 competition. Since then until its discontinuation in 2020, the tournament was an Under-16 competition. The list of some of the players that have played at the tournament, and have then gone on to have successful pro careers, includes players like: Hedo Türkoğlu, Kerem Tunçeri, Dirk Nowitzki, Tony Parker, Ömer Aşık, Ersan İlyasova, and Peja Stojaković.

== TBF International Under-16 Tournament results ==
Year	Host	Category	Gold Medal	Silver Medal	Bronze Medal
1994	Sakarya	Under-18	Italy	Germany	Turkey
1995	Edirne	Under-16	Turkey	Turkey B	Moldova
1997	Sakarya	Under-16	Yugoslavia	France	Turkey
1998	Antalya	Under-16	Yugoslavia (2×)	Turkey	Lithuania
1999	Antalya	Under-16	Bulgaria	Yugoslavia	Turkey
2001	Bursa	Under-16	Russia	Macedonia	Turkey
2002	Istanbul	B	Sweden	Italy	Turkey
2005	Sakarya	Under-16	Turkey (2×)	Serbia and Montenegro	Italy
2006	Sakarya	Under-16	Serbia and Montenegro (3×)	Iran	Turkey
2007	Sakarya	Under-16	Turkey (3×)	France	Croatia
2008	Sakarya	Under-16	Greece	Italy	France
2009	Ankara	Under-16	Turkey (4×)	Slovenia	Croatia
2010	Konya	Under-16	Serbia	France	Turkey
2011	Gaziantep	Under-16	China	Turkey	Germany
2012	Sakarya	Under-16	Egypt	Poland	Russia
2013	Sakarya	Under-16	Greece (2×)	Serbia	France
2014	Sakarya	Under-16	Latvia	France	Germany
2015	Konya	Under-16	Turkey (5×)	Lithuania	France
2016	Samsun	Under-16	Lithuania	Serbia	Turkey
2017	Konya	Under-16	Turkey (6×)	Lithuania	Argentina
2018	Sakarya	Under-16	France	Lithuania	China
2019	Sakarya	Under-16	Lithuania (2×)	Serbia	Turkey
2020	Konya	Under-16	Turkey (7×)	Russia	Lithuania

== See also ==
- FIBA Under-17 World Cup
- AST Under-18 World Cup
- FIBA Under-19 World Cup
