= Eurocup Basketball 2010–11 Last 16 Group J =

Standings and results for Group J of the last 16 phase of the 2010–11 Eurocup basketball tournament.

== Standings ==
Key to colors
| Top two places in each group advance to the Quarterfinals |

| | Team | Pld | W | L | PF | PA | Diff | Tie-break |
|---|---|---|---|---|---|---|---|---|
| 1. | (Ukraine) BC Budivelnyk | 6 | 4 | 2 | 417 | 413 | +4 | 2–0 (+17) |
| 2. | (Germany) BG Göttingen | 6 | 4 | 2 | 433 | 416 | +17 | 0–2 (-17) |
| 3. | (France) Le Mans | 6 | 2 | 4 | 444 | 445 | −1 | 2–0 (+20) |
| 4. | (Greece) Aris BSA 2003 | 6 | 2 | 4 | 443 | 463 | −20 | 0–2 (−20) |

== Fixtures and results ==
All times given below are in Central European Time.

=== Game 1 ===
18 January 2011
19:30

Report

| BG Göttingen (Germany) | 75–71 | (France) Le Mans |
Scoring by quarter: 16–19, 16–20, 22–27, 21–15
| Pts: Scott 27; Rebs: Boone 7 Asts: Meacham 10 | | Pts: Diot 18; Rebs: Batista 6 Asts: Batista 5 |

Lokhalle, Göttingen
Attendance: 1,802
Referees: Radomir Vojinovic (MNE), Gianluca Mattioli (ITA), Francisco Arana (ESP)

18 January 2011
20:00

Report

| Aris BSA 2003 (Greece) | 85–69 | (Ukraine) BC Budivelnyk |
Scoring by quarter: 22–15, 19–15, 18–23, 26–16
| Pts: Brown 23; Rebs: Tucker 5 Asts: Brown 5 | | Pts: Morley, Wilson 14; Rebs: Morley 8 Asts: Keys 3 |

Alexandreio Melathron, Thessaloniki
Attendance: 1,000
Referees: Milivoje Jovcic (SRB), Antonio Conde (ESP), Haris Bijedic (BIH)

=== Game 2 ===
25 January 2011
18:00

Report

| BC Budivelnyk (Ukraine) | 68–56 | (Germany) BG Göttingen |
Scoring by quarter: 19–17, 15–9, 22–9, 12–21
| Pts: Wilson 19; Rebs: Morley 9 Asts: Three players 4 | | Pts: Little 14; Rebs: Kulawick, Scott 6 Asts: Meacham 3 |

Palace of Sports, Kyiv
Attendance: 3,450
Referees: Sasa Maricic (SRB), Rustu Nuran (TUR), Aleksandar Milojevik (MKD)

25 January 2011
19:00

Report

| Le Mans (France) | 85–70 | (Greece) Aris BSA 2003 |
Scoring by quarter: 19–18, 24–24, 24–12, 18–16
| Pts: Acker 19; Rebs: Dewar 8 Asts: Acker 6 | | Pts: Tapoutos 14; Rebs: Tapoutos 8 Asts: Brown, Sloukas 3 |

Antarès, Le Mans
Attendance: 3,100
Referees: Luigi Lamonica (ITA), Oliver Krause (GER), Perar Obradovic (BIH)

=== Game 3 ===
1 February 2011
18:00

Report

| BC Budivelnyk (Ukraine) | 67–61 | (France) Le Mans |
Scoring by quarter: 18–14, 13–15, 21–14, 15–18
| Pts: Keys 16; Rebs: Keys 10; Asts: Lukashov 5 | | Pts: Batista 18; Rebs: Diot, Kakiouzis 5 Asts: Acker 4 |

Palace of Sports, Kyiv
Attendance: 3,459
Referees: Spiros Gkontas (GRE), Sinisa Herceg (CRO), Zdravko Rutesic (MNE)

1 February 2011
20:00

Report

| Aris BSA 2003 (Greece) | 82–84 | (Germany) BG Göttingen |
Scoring by quarter: 22–16, 21–23, 19–13, 20–32
| Pts: Charalampidis 18; Rebs: Tucker 9 Asts: Tapoutos, Sloukas 4 | | Pts: Scott 18; Rebs: Boone 8 Asts: Dale 10 |

Alexandreio Melathron, Thessaloniki
Attendance: 1,700
Referees: Jose Ramon Garcia Ortiz (ESP), Robert Vyklicky (CZE), Marcin Kowalski (POL)

=== Game 4 ===
15 February 2011
20:30

Report

| Le Mans (France) | 72–77 | (Ukraine) BC Budivelnyk |
Scoring by quarter: 14–23, 23–17, 20–11, 15–26
| Pts: Acker 24; Rebs: Diot 8 Asts: Dewar, Acker 5 | | Pts: Spencer 20; Rebs: Wilson 8 Asts: Morley 5 |

Antarès, Le Mans
Attendance: 3,850
Referees: Fernando Rocha (POR), Apostolos Kalapakas (SWE), Moritz Reiter (GER)

16 February 2011
19:30

Report

| BG Göttingen (Germany) | 74–55 | (Greece) Aris BSA 2003 |
Scoring by quarter: 21–6, 24–14, 19–18, 10–17
| Pts: Anderson 18; Rebs: Boone 11; Asts: Dale 4 | | Pts: Tucker 17; Rebs: Tapoutos 8 Asts: Brown, Hatzivrettas 2 |

Lokhalle, Göttingen
Attendance: 2,756
Referees: Fabio Facchini (ITA), Marek Cmikiewicz (POL), Oscar Perea (ESP)

=== Game 5 ===
22 February 2011
18:00

Report

| BC Budivelnyk (Ukraine) | 73–78 | (Greece) Aris BSA 2003 |
Scoring by quarter: 20–14, 22–13, 11–23, 20–28
| Pts: Keys 17; Rebs: Mosley 10; Asts: Spencer 6 | | Pts: Brown 24; Rebs: Tucker 15; Asts: Brown 5 |

Palace of Sports, Kyiv
Attendance: 1,200
Referees: Jakub Zamojski (POL), Jurgis Laurinavicius (LTU), Oskar Lucis (LAT)

22 February 2011
20:30

Report

| Le Mans (France) | 77–83 | (Germany) BG Göttingen |
Scoring by quarter: 22–19, 18–26, 17–17, 20–21
| Pts: Acker 18; Rebs: Bowman 7 Asts: Acker 6 | | Pts: Scott 20; Rebs: Anderson 9 Asts: Jordan 4 |

Antarès, Le Mans
Attendance: 3,750
Referees: Juan Carlos Mitjana (ESP), Miguel Angel Perez Niz (ESP), Damir Javor (SLO)

=== Game 6 ===
1 March 2011
20:00

Report

| Aris BSA 2003 (Greece) | 73–78 | (France) Le Mans |
Scoring by quarter: 17–18, 17–16, 18–14, 21–30
| Pts: Brown 22; Rebs: Borovnjak 9 Asts: Tapoutos 4 | | Pts: Dewar 25; Rebs: Bowman, Dewar 6 Asts: Kahudi 7 |

Alexandreio Melathron, Thessaloniki
Attendance: 1,000
Referees: Grzegorz Ziemblicki (POL), Antonio Conde (ESP), Gianluca Mattioli (ITA)

1 March 2011
20:00

report

| BG Göttingen (Germany) | 61–63 | (Ukraine) BC Budivelnyk |
Scoring by quarter: 18–18, 11–11, 5–16, 27–18
| Pts: Boone 16; Rebs: Boone 9 Asts: Little 5 | | Pts: Zabirchenko 14; Rebs: Morley 9 Asts: Keys, Morley 4 |

Lokhalle, Göttingen
Attendance: 880
Referees: Juan Carlos Arteaga (ESP), Tomas Jasevicius (LTU), Petar Obradovic (BIH)
