= DBB Albert Schweitzer Tournament =

International basketball event in Mannheim, Germany

Albert Schweitzer Tournament (AST)
- Sport: Basketball
- Founded: 1958
- No. of teams: 12
- Country: Germany
- Continent: Europe
- Most recent champions: Germany (Boys) (3rd title); Japan (Girls) (1st title)
- Most titles: United States (Boys) (10 titles); Japan (Girls) (1 title)
- Website: ast.basketball-bund.de

The DBB Albert Schweitzer Tournament (German: Albert-Schweitzer-Turnier, abbreviated as AST), full name DBB Albert Schweitzer World Under-18 Tournament (German: DBB Albert Schweitzer Welt-Unter-18-Turnier), is an international basketball competition that is played between national teams of the Under-18 men's age category. It takes place every two years in Mannheim, Germany, and is contested between teams from 12 countries.

The organizers of the tournament are the German Basketball Federation (German: Deutscher Basketball Bund, abbreviated as DBB), and the city of Mannheim. The tournament is named after Albert Schweitzer. Since FIBA does not organize an Under-18 world championship, the Albert Schweitzer Tournament is internationally recognized and considered an official non-FIBA organized world championship for the Under-18 age group. From 1958 to 1993, the tournament was an Under-19 age competition. Since 1994, it has been an under-18 age competition.

== History ==
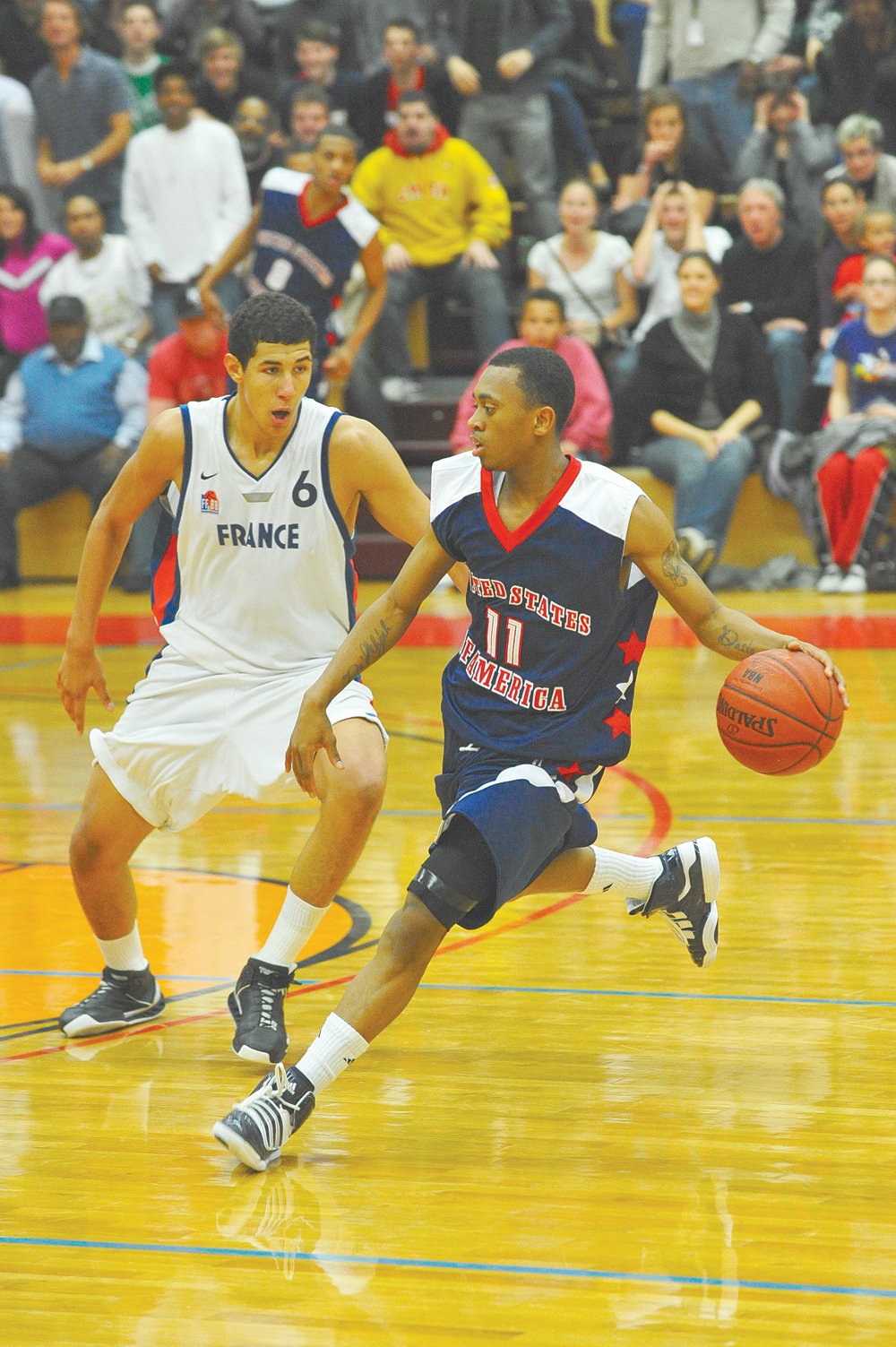
Ryan Boatright of USA Under-18 with the ball, against France Under-18, at the 2010 AST.

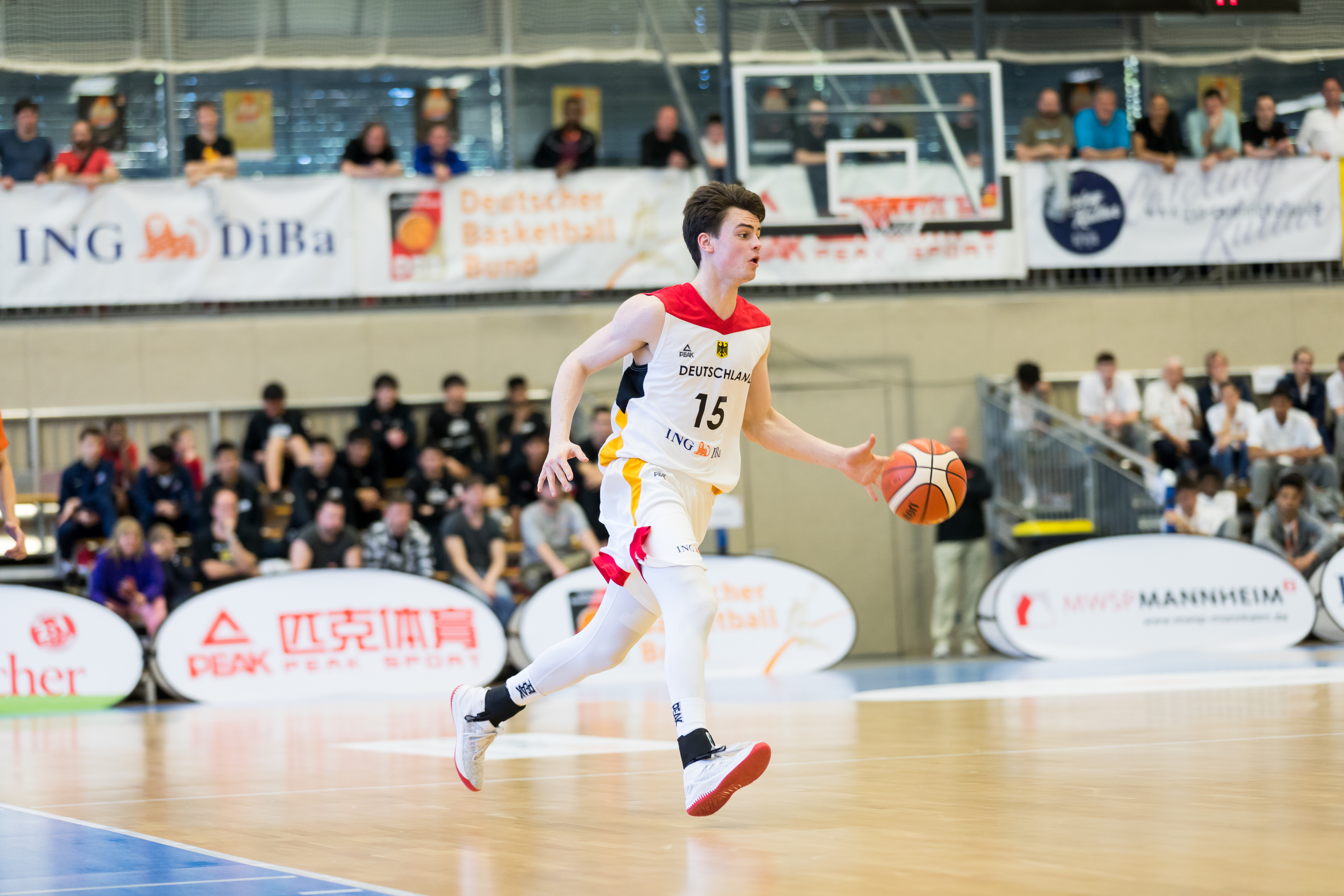
2018 AST MVP, Jonas Mattisseck of Germany Under-18, in the 2018 AST Final against Australia Under-18.

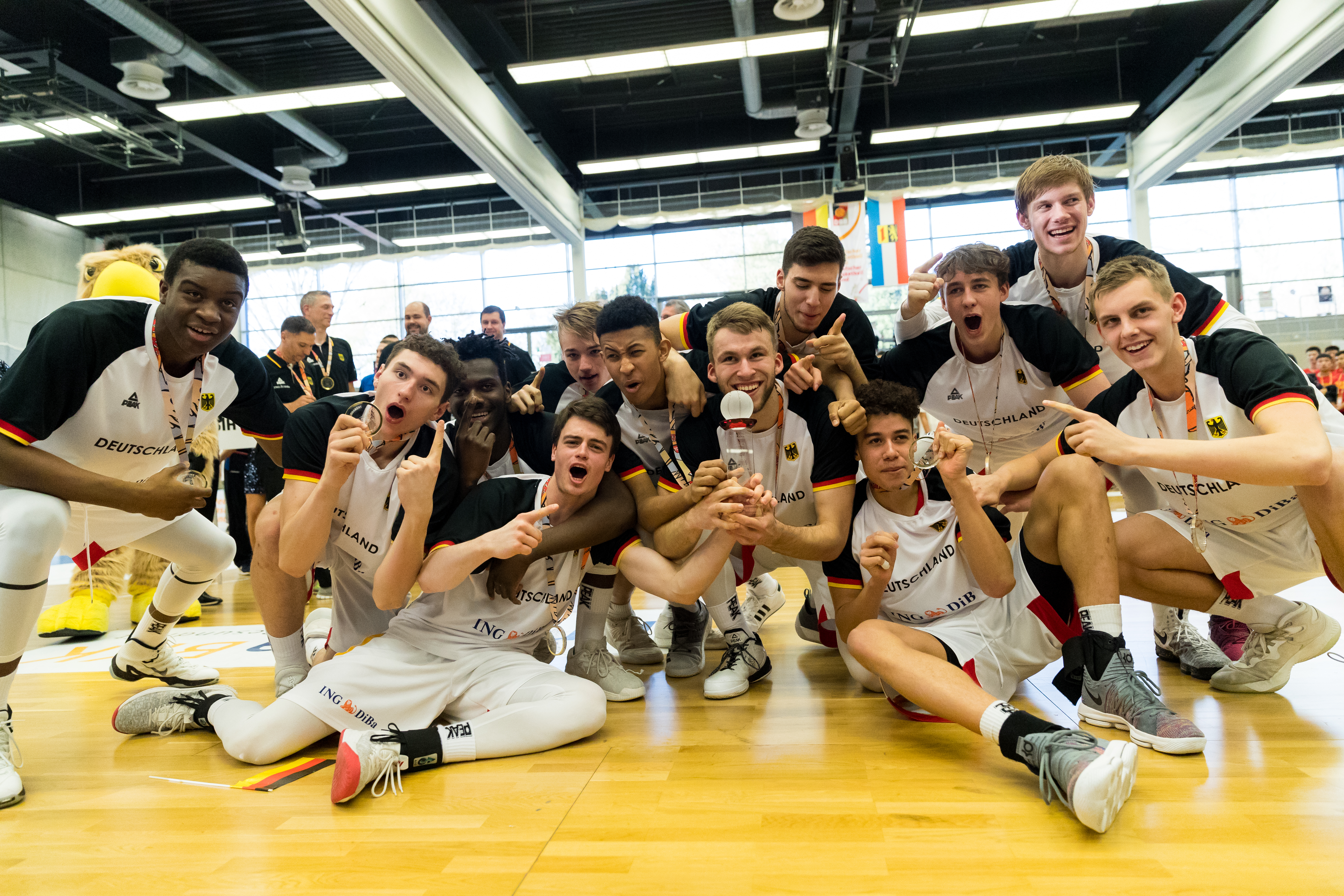
Germany Under-18, after winning the 2018 AST.

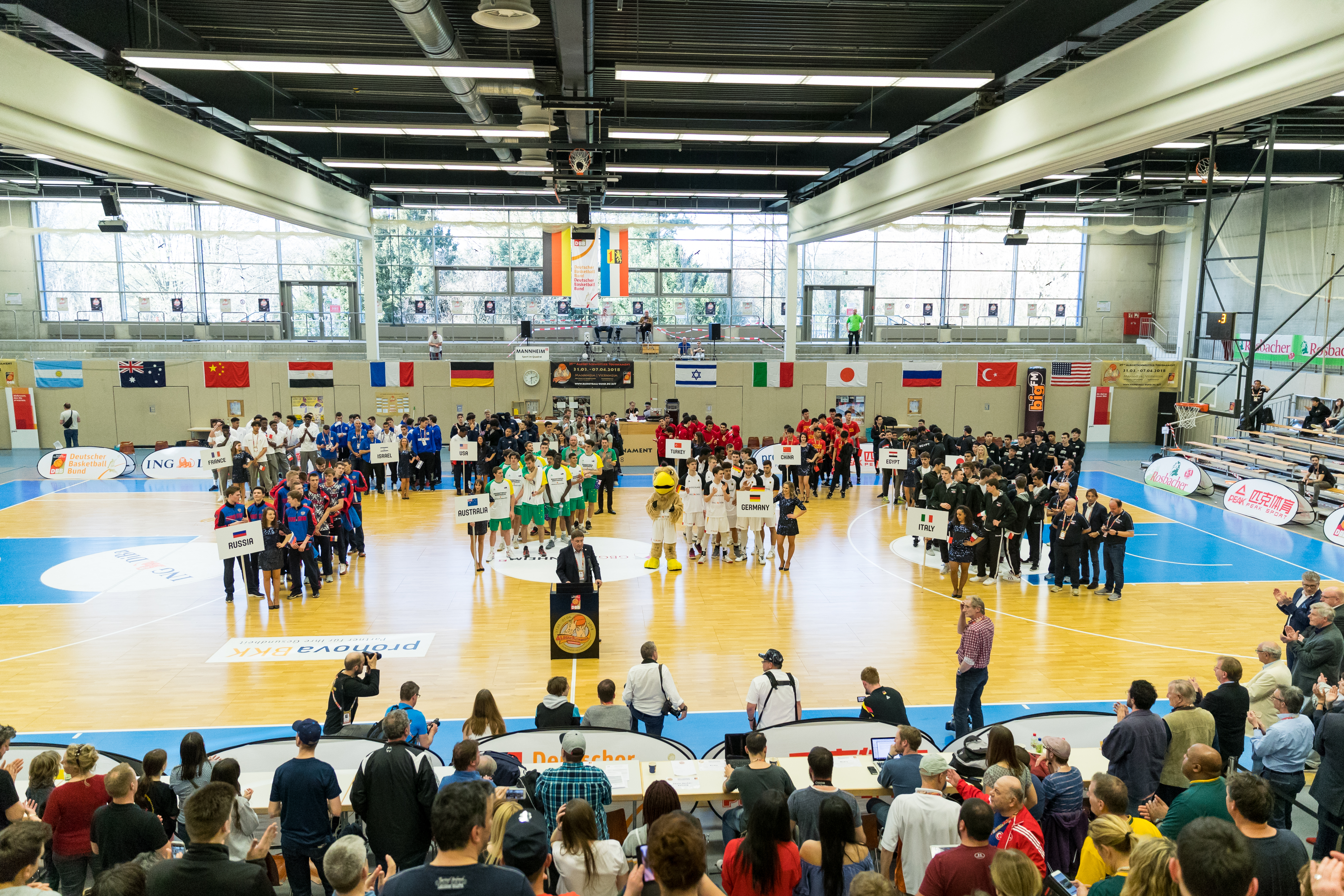
All 12 participating teams at the 2018 AST closing ceremony.

The first Albert Schweitzer Tournament took place in December 1958. It was contested between eight teams, and won by Belgium. Hans-Joachim Babies, and the German basketball pioneer, Hermann Niebuhr, asked the theologian and physician, Albert Schweitzer, if they could use his namesake for the name of the tournament. After the second tournament in 1960, there was a break in play until 1966. From that point onwards, a two-year tournament cycle was established.

From 1958 to 1971, Team USA used players that were the dependents of the USA's military forces. Starting with the 1973 tournament, Team USA began to use players that were selected from throughout the entire USA high school system.

The 1991 tournament was canceled, due to the Gulf War. In 1994, the tournament switched from an Under-19 competition, to an Under-18 competition, and has since been held during even-numbered years.

The USA has won the most titles, winning ten. The USA is followed by Italy with four titles. The tournament's record attendance so far was 28,763 spectators. Due to the spread of COVID-19, the 2020 tournament was cancelled. Due to COVID-19, the 2022 tournament was also cancelled. The tournament resumed in 2024.

== Results ==
Summaries
Year	Gold Medal	Silver Medal	Bronze Medal	4th Place
1958	Belgium	Austria	Germany	United States
1960	Belgium	Austria	United States	Netherlands
1966	Italy	Turkey	Austria	United States
1967	Poland	Austria	France	Belgium
1969	Italy	Czechoslovakia	Poland	Turkey
1971	Yugoslavia	Italy	Poland	Spain
1973	United States	Poland	Yugoslavia	Italy
1975	United States	Turkey	Spain	Poland
1977	United States	Spain	Turkey	Germany
1979	Yugoslavia	Spain	United States	Soviet Union
1981	United States	Soviet Union	Bulgaria	Germany
1983	Italy	United States	Germany	Finland
1985	United States	Yugoslavia	Turkey	Sweden
1987	United States	Spain	Turkey	Germany
1989	United States	Greece	France	Czechoslovakia
1993	United States	Lithuania	Italy	Greece
1994	United States	Spain	Australia	Lithuania
1996	United States	France	Greece	Turkey
1998	Spain	Australia	United States	Turkey
2000	FR Yugoslavia	Greece	United States	Australia
2002	Greece	Spain	FR Yugoslavia	United States
2004	Turkey	Argentina	Spain	Serbia and Montenegro
2006	France	Turkey	Serbia	Croatia
2008	Greece	Turkey	Australia	United States
2010	Australia	Germany	Germany	United States
2012	Spain	Serbia	Turkey	Germany
2014	Italy	United States	Serbia	Turkey
2016	Germany	Serbia	Italy	France
2018	Germany	Australia	Italy	Russia
2020	Cancelled due to the COVID-19 pandemic			
2022	Cancelled due to the COVID-19 pandemic			
2024	Australia	Serbia	Germany	Italy
2026	Germany (Boys); Japan (Girls)	Slovenia (Boys); Serbia (Girls)	Brazil (Boys); Italy (Girls)	Serbia (Boys); Germany (Girls)

== Performance by nation ==
Country	Winners
United States	10
Italy	4
Germany	3
Australia	2
Spain	2
Greece	2
Yugoslavia	2
Belgium	2
France	1
Turkey	1
Serbia and Montenegro	1
Poland	1

== Future stars ==
The tournament is an important event for professional basketball scouts from around the world. Over the years, many players who have played at the tournament have gone on to become well-known pro players, both in the NBA, and the EuroLeague.

Some of the NBA players who have played at the AST are:

- (United States) Magic Johnson
- (United States) Eddie Johnson
- (United States) B. J. Armstrong
- (United States) Eddie Griffin
- (United States) Luke Babbitt
- (United States) Kyle Lowry
- (United States) Ramon Sessions
- (United States) Cole Aldrich
- (United States) Vince Carter
- (United States) Glen Rice
- (United States) Kent Benson
- (United States) Kevin Garnett
- (United States) Joseph Forte
- (United States) Carlos Boozer
- (United States) Andre Barrett
- (United States) Jermaine O'Neal
- (United States) Baron Davis
- (United States Virgin Islands) Tim Duncan
- (Canada) Robert Sacre
- (Argentina) Facu Campazzo
- (Germany) Dirk Nowitzki
- (Germany) Detlef Schrempf
- (Germany) Daniel Theis
- (Germany) Paul Zipser
- (Germany) Ariel Hukporti
- (France) Tony Parker
- (France) Jérôme Moïso
- (France) Ronny Turiaf
- (France) Boris Diaw
- (France) Johan Petro
- (France) Rudy Gobert
- (France) Evan Fournier
- (France) Nicolas Batum
- (France) Alexis Ajinça
- (Spain) Pau Gasol
- (Spain) Raül López
- (Spain) Víctor Claver
- (Spain) Willy Hernangómez
- (Socialist Federal Republic of Yugoslavia) Toni Kukoč
- (Socialist Federal Republic of Yugoslavia) Dražen Petrović
- (Socialist Federal Republic of Yugoslavia) Dino Rađja
- (Federal Republic of Yugoslavia) Igor Rakočević
- (Serbia) Miroslav Raduljica
- (Croatia) Dario Šarić
- (Croatia) Bruno Šundov
- (Croatia) Zoran Planinić
- (Croatia) Bojan Bogdanović
- (Slovenia) Uroš Slokar
- (Russia) Victor Khryapa
- (Russia) Andrei Kirilenko
- (Lithuania) Šarūnas Jasikevičius
- (Lithuania) Darius Songaila
- (Soviet Union) Arvydas Sabonis
- (Ukraine) Svi Mykhailiuk
- (Turkey) Hedo Türkoğlu
- (Turkey) Memo Okur
- (Turkey) Ersan İlyasova
- (Turkey) Enes Kanter
- (Turkey) Furkan Aldemir
- (Turkey) Cedi Osman
- (Greece) Kostas Papanikolaou
- (Greece) Andreas Glyniadakis
- (Greece) Antonis Fotsis
- (Greece) Vassilis Spanoulis
- (Israel) Omri Casspi
- (Israel) Gal Mekel
- (Israel) Deni Avdija
- (China) Yi Jianlian
- (Australia) Patrick Mills
- (Australia) David Andersen
- (Australia) Andrew Bogut
- (Australia) Matthew Dellavedova
- (Australia) Mitch Creek

In addition, some of the players who have played in various international senior men's professional top-tier national domestic leagues and who have also played at the AST are:

- (United States) Chuck Eidson
- (United States) Erving Walker
- (United States) Lamont Barnes
- (United States) Chris Burgess
- (United States) Kevin Freeman
- (United States) Mark Karcher
- (United States) Ethan Happ
- (Germany) Ismet Akpinar
- (Germany) Robin Benzing
- (Germany) Richard Freudenberg
- (Germany) Niels Giffey
- (Germany) Kostja Mushidi
- (Germany) Maik Zirbes
- (Germany) Jonas Mattisseck
- (Germany) / (Tunisia) Ziyed Chennoufi
- (France) Andrew Albicy
- (France) Antoine Diot
- (France) Edwin Jackson
- (France) Adrien Moerman
- (France) Kim Tillie
- (France) Joseph Gomis
- (France) Mam Jaiteh
- (Spain) Juan San Epifanio "Epi"
- (Spain) Albert Miralles
- (Spain) Quino Colom
- (Spain) Josep Franch
- (Spain) Pierre Oriola
- (Spain) Alberto Díaz
- (Croatia) Tomislav Zubčić
- (Croatia) Leon Radošević
- (Croatia) Mario Delaš
- (Croatia) Toni Prostran
- (Croatia) Andrija Žižić
- (Serbia) Milan Mačvan
- (Serbia) Nikola Radičević
- (Serbia) Nikola Rebić
- (Serbia) Dušan Ristić
- (Serbia) Mihajlo Andrić
- (Serbia) Stefan Lazarević
- (Serbia) Stefan Marković
- (Serbia) Nikola Milutinov
- (Serbia) Boriša Simanić
- (Serbia) Aleksa Radanov
- (Slovenia) Erazem Lorbek
- (Ukraine) Sergiy Gladyr
- (Soviet Union) Igors Miglinieks
- (Soviet Union) Valery Tikhonenko
- (Russia) Fedor Likholitov
- (Russia) Andrey Desyatnikov
- (Russia) Mikhail Kulagin
- (Lithuania) Martynas Gecevičius
- (Sweden) Ludde Hakanson
- (Turkey) Doğuş Balbay
- (Turkey) Deniz Kılıçlı
- (Turkey) Egemen Güven
- (Turkey) Ender Arslan
- (Turkey) Kerem Tunçeri
- (Italy) Antonello Riva
- (Italy) Pietro Aradori
- (Italy) Federico Mussini
- (Italy) Dino Meneghin
- (Italy) Diego Flaccadori
- (Italy) Davide Moretti
- (Israel) Idan Zalmanson
- (Greece) Nikos Zisis
- (Greece) Charis Giannopoulos
- (Greece) George Bogris
- (Greece) Vangelis Mantzaris
- (Greece) Leonidas Kaselakis
- (Greece) Nikos Pappas
- (Greece) Kostas Sloukas
- (Greece) Vlado Janković
- (Greece) Linos Chrysikopoulos
- (Greece) Dimitris Katsivelis
- (Greece) Nondas Papantoniou
- (Greece) Sofoklis Schortsanitis
- (Greece) Lazaros Papadopoulos
- (Greece) Christos Tapoutos
- (Greece) Michalis Lountzis
- (Greece) Dimitris Moraitis
- (Greece) Kostas Papadakis
- (Greece) Charis Markopoulos
- (Greece) Dimitris Agravanis
- (Greece) Lefteris Bochoridis
- (China) Chen Jianghua
- (Australia) Andrew Ogilvy
- (New Zealand) Tai Webster

== Awards ==
In 2026 for the first time a Girl's tournament was held with separate awards for MVP, most talented player and All Tournament Team.

=== MVP Award ===
Year	MVP
1996	(United States) Kevin Freeman
1998	(Australia) David Andersen
2000	(Greece) Charis Markopoulos
2002	(Greece) Sofoklis Schortsanitis
2004	(Turkey) Ersan İlyasova
2006	(France) Nicolas Batum
2008	(Greece) Nikos Pappas
2010	(Australia) Mitch Creek
2012	(Serbia) Nikola Radičević
2014	(United States) Ethan Happ
2016	(Germany) Kostja Mushidi
2018	(Germany) Jonas Mattisseck
2024	(Australia) Rocco Zikarsky
2026	(Germany) Jamie Edoka (Male) (Japan) Miya Takeuchi (Female)

=== Burkhard Wildermuth Prize ===
The Burkhard Wildermuth Prize, or Burkhard Wildermuth Award, was first awarded in 2006, and is given to the player in each tournament that is deemed to be the "Most Talented Player". The award is named after Dr. Burkhard Wildermuth, the long-time co-organizer of the Albert Schweitzer Tournament.

Year	Most Talented Player
2006	(France) Alexis Ajinça
2008	(Turkey) Enes Kanter
2010	(Croatia) Dario Šarić
2012	(Turkey) Cedi Osman
2014	(Chile) Nicolás Aguirre
2016	(China) Zhu Rongzhen
2018	(Israel) Tomer Levinson
2024	(China) Boyuan Zhang
2026	(Turkey) Darius Karutasu (Male) (Italy) Divinie Obaseki (Female)

=== All-Tournament Team ===
- 2000:
  - (Greece) Charis Markopoulos
  - (Germany) Misan Haldin
  - (Greece) Christos Tapoutos
  - (Russia) Victor Khryapa
  - (Australia) Jacob Holmes
- 2006:
  - (Turkey) Doğuş Balbay
  - (France) Nicolas Batum
  - (Israel) Omri Casspi
  - (Serbia) Miroslav Raduljica
  - (France) Alexis Ajinça
- 2008:
  - (United States) Erving Walker
  - (Greece) Nikos Pappas
  - (Croatia) Tomislav Zubčić
  - (Turkey) Deniz Kılıçlı
  - (Turkey) Enes Kanter
- 2010:
  - (Australia) Jackson Aldridge
  - (France) Evan Fournier
  - (Australia) Hugh Greenwood
  - (Australia) Mitch Creek
  - (Germany) Philipp Neumann
- 2012:
  - (Serbia) Nikola Radičević
  - (Spain) Josep Pérez
  - (Germany) Paul Zipser
  - (Serbia) Mihajlo Andrić
  - (Spain) Willy Hernangómez
- 2014:
  - (Italy) Federico Mussini
  - (Sweden) Ludde Hakanson
  - (Serbia) Stefan Lazarević
  - (United States) Ethan Happ
  - (Turkey) Egemen Güven
- 2016:
  - (Italy) Davide Moretti
  - (Serbia) Aleksa Radanov
  - (Germany) Richard Freudenberg
  - (Serbia) Boriša Simanić
  - (China) Zhu Rongzhen
- 2018:
  - (Germany) Jonas Mattisseck
  - (Italy) Federico Miaschi
  - (Russia) Nikita Mikhaylovsky
  - (Australia) Callum Dalton
  - (Germany) Hendrik Drescher
- 2024:
  - (Serbia) Savo Drezgić
  - (Germany) Jack Kayil
  - (Australia) Roman Siulepa
  - (Germany) Hannes Steinbach
  - (Australia) Rocco Zikarsky
- 2026 (Boys):
  - (Germany) Jamie Edoka
  - (Slovenia) Lukas Bojovic
  - (New Zealand) Jackson Ball
  - (Brazil) Mathias Santos
  - (Italy) Thomas Acunzo
- 2026 (Girls):
  - (Japan) Miya Takeuchi
  - (Serbia) Nevena Petrovic
  - (Germany) Mia Wiegand
  - (Japan) Kako Otsuki
  - (Italy) Divinie Obaseki

== See also ==
- TBF Under-16 World Cup
- FIBA Under-17 World Cup
- FIBA Under-19 World Cup
