= Allen Iverson =

American basketball player (born 1975)

- Iverson with the Detroit Pistons in 2008

Personal information
- Born: June 7, 1975 (age 51) Hampton, Virginia, U.S.
- Listed height: 6 ft 0 in (1.83 m)
- Listed weight: 165 lb (75 kg)

Career information
- High school: Bethel (Hampton, Virginia)
- College: Georgetown (1994–1996)
- NBA draft: 1996: 1st round, 1st overall pick
- Drafted by: Philadelphia 76ers
- Playing career: 1996–2011
- Position: Shooting guard / point guard
- Number: 3, 1, 4

Career history
- 1996–2006: Philadelphia 76ers
- 2006–2008: Denver Nuggets
- 2008–2009: Detroit Pistons
- 2009: Memphis Grizzlies
- 2009–2010: Philadelphia 76ers
- 2010–2011: Beşiktaş

Career highlights
- NBA Most Valuable Player (2001); 11× NBA All-Star (2000–2010); 2× NBA All-Star Game MVP (2001, 2005); 3× All-NBA First Team (1999, 2001, 2005); 3× All-NBA Second Team (2000, 2002, 2003); All-NBA Third Team (2006); NBA Rookie of the Year (1997); NBA All-Rookie First Team (1997); 4× NBA scoring champion (1999, 2001, 2002, 2005); 3× NBA steals leader (2001–2003); NBA 75th Anniversary Team; No. 3 retired by Philadelphia 76ers; Consensus first-team All-American (1996); First-team All-Big East (1996); Second-team All-Big East (1995); 2× Big East Defensive Player of the Year (1995, 1996); Big East Rookie of the Year (1995); First-team Parade All-American (1993); Virginia Mr. Basketball (1993)

Career statistics
- Points: 24,368 (26.7 ppg)
- Rebounds: 3,394 (3.7 rpg)
- Assists: 5,624 (6.2 apg)
- Stats at NBA.com
- Stats at Basketball Reference
- Basketball Hall of Fame
Medals
Men's basketball
Representing the United States
Olympic Games
Bronze medal – third place	2004 Athens	United States
FIBA Americas Championship
Gold medal – first place	2003 San Juan	United States
Summer Universiade
Gold medal – first place	1995 Fukuoka	United States

Allen Ezail Iverson (/ˈaɪvərsən/ EYE-vər-sən; born June 7, 1975) is an American former professional basketball player. Nicknamed "the Answer", he played 14 seasons in the National Basketball Association (NBA) as both a shooting guard and point guard. As an NBA rookie with the Philadelphia 76ers in 1997, Iverson was named NBA Rookie of the Year. He was an 11-time NBA All-Star, won the All-Star Game MVP Award in 2001 and 2005, and was the NBA's Most Valuable Player (MVP) in 2001. He was inducted into the Naismith Memorial Basketball Hall of Fame in 2016. In October 2021, he was named to the NBA 75th Anniversary Team. Iverson is widely regarded as one of the game's greatest scorers, ball handlers, guards, and among the most influential athletes in all of American sports.

Iverson attended Bethel High School in Hampton, Virginia, and was a dual-sport athlete. He earned the Associated Press High School Player of the Year award in both football and basketball, and won the Division 5 AAA Virginia state championship in both sports. After high school, Iverson played college basketball with the Georgetown Hoyas for two years, where he set the school record for career scoring average (23.0 points per game) and won the Big East Defensive Player of the Year award both years.

Following two successful years at Georgetown University, Iverson declared eligibility for the 1996 NBA draft, and was selected by the Philadelphia 76ers with the first overall pick. He was named the NBA Rookie of the Year in the 1996–97 season. A four-time scoring champion, winning the NBA scoring title during the 1998–99, 2000–01, 2001–02, and 2004–05 seasons, Iverson was one of the most prolific scorers in NBA history, despite his relatively small stature (listed at 6 feet, 0 inches, or 183 centimeters). His regular season career scoring average of 26.7 points per game ranks seventh all-time, and his playoff career scoring average of 29.7 points per game trails only Michael Jordan and Luka Dončić. Iverson was also the NBA Most Valuable Player of the 2000–01 season, and led his team to the 2001 NBA Finals the same season. Iverson represented the United States at the 2004 Summer Olympics, winning the bronze medal.

Later in his career, Iverson played for the Denver Nuggets, Detroit Pistons, and the Memphis Grizzlies, before ending his NBA career with the 76ers during the 2009–10 season. He was rated the fifth-greatest NBA shooting guard of all time by ESPN in 2008. He finished his career in Turkey with Beşiktaş in 2011. He returned as a player-coach for 3's Company in the inaugural season of the BIG3.

== Early life ==
Iverson was born in Hampton, Virginia, to a single 15-year-old mother, Ann Iverson. His father, Allen Broughton, was not involved in raising him.

During his early childhood years in Hampton, Iverson was given the nickname "Bubba Chuck". A childhood friend, Jaime Rogers, said that Iverson would always "look out for the younger kids" and that "he could teach anybody." When Iverson was 13, father figure Michael Freeman was arrested in front of Iverson for dealing drugs. Iverson then failed eighth grade because of excessive absences and moved to get out of the projects.

He attended Bethel High School, where he started as quarterback for the school football team while also playing running back, kick returner, and defensive back. He also started at point guard for the school basketball team. During his junior year, Iverson was able to lead both teams to Virginia state championships, and was awarded the Associated Press High School Player of the Year award in both sports. In 2025, he was inducted into the National High School Football Hall of Fame.

Iverson played for the "Boo" Williams-led AAU basketball team and won the 1992 17-and-under AAU national championship. This team was coached by Williams, who has been credited by Iverson as his most inspirational coach of all time.

=== Incarceration ===
On February 14, 1993, Iverson and several of his friends were involved in an altercation with several other patrons at a bowling alley in Hampton, Virginia. Allegedly, Iverson's crowd was raucous and had to be asked to quiet down several times, and eventually a shouting duel began with another group of youths. Shortly after that a fight erupted, pitting the white crowd against the black crowd. During the fight, Iverson allegedly struck a woman on the head with a chair. He and three of his friends, who were also black, were the only people arrested. Iverson, who was 17 at the time, was convicted as an adult of the felony charge of maiming by mob, a rarely used Virginia statute that was designed to combat lynching. Of the incident, Iverson said: "For me to be in a bowling alley where everybody in the whole place know who I am and be crackin' people upside the head with chairs and think nothin' gonna happen? That's crazy! And what kind of a man would I be to hit a girl in the head with a damn chair? I rather have 'em say I hit a man with a chair, not no damn woman."

Iverson was sentenced to 15 years in prison with 10 years suspended. After he spent four months at Newport News City Farm, a correctional facility in Newport News, he was granted clemency by Virginia Governor Douglas Wilder, and the Virginia Court of Appeals eventually overturned the conviction in 1995 for insufficient evidence. This incident and its impact on the community is explored in the documentary film No Crossover: The Trial of Allen Iverson. Iverson's high school basketball coach stated: "They wanted to make an example out of Iverson." James Elleson, Iverson's lawyer, said: "Only defendants not given bond are capital murderers." Tom Brokaw and the public played a huge role in the release of Iverson. There were rallies and marches for all four black men who were incarcerated, and Brokaw did a special interview with Iverson from the jail. In this special, Iverson was very apologetic and somber. Brokaw even said: "I thought the sentence was surprisingly harsh."

Of his time in prison, Iverson said: "I had to use the whole jail situation as something positive. Going to jail, someone sees something weak in you, they'll exploit it. I never showed any weakness. I just kept going strong until I came out." The prison sentence forced him to complete his senior year of high school at Richard Milburn High School, a school for at-risk students, instead of competing in sports at Bethel. However, the three years Iverson spent at Bethel were enough to convince Georgetown University head coach John Thompson to come out and meet Iverson, and offer him a full scholarship to join the Georgetown Hoyas basketball team.

== College career ==
In his first season at Georgetown in 1994–95, Iverson won the Big East Rookie of the Year award and was named to the All Rookie Tournament First Team. That season, Iverson averaged 20.4 points and led the Hoyas to the Sweet 16 round of the NCAA tournament, where they lost to the North Carolina Tar Heels.

In his second and final season at Georgetown in 1995–96, Iverson led the team to a Big East championship and the Elite Eight of the NCAA tournament, where they lost to Massachusetts. He ended his college career as the Hoyas' all-time leader in career scoring average, at 22.9 points per game. Iverson was named a first-team All-American. Iverson was also named the Big East Defensive Player of the Year in each of his two seasons at Georgetown.

Following his sophomore year, Iverson declared for the 1996 NBA draft. He was the first player under Coach Thompson to leave Georgetown early for the NBA.

== Professional career ==
=== Philadelphia 76ers (1996–2006) ===
==== Early years (1996–2000) ====
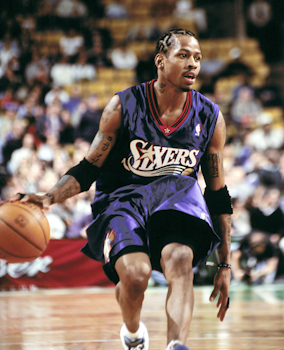
Iverson was drafted first overall by the Philadelphia 76ers and would be named Rookie of the Year

After two seasons at Georgetown, Iverson was selected with the 1st overall pick in the 1996 NBA draft to the Philadelphia 76ers. Listed at 6 ft 0 in (1.83 m) tall, he became the shortest first overall pick ever, in a league normally dominated by taller players.

Iverson came to a Philadelphia team that had just finished the previous season with a dismal 18–64 record. In his NBA debut, Iverson recorded 30 points and 6 assists on a 103–111 loss to the Milwaukee Bucks. He tied Willie Anderson for the third highest scoring output by a rookie guard in his debut. On November 12, 1996, Iverson recorded a then career-high of 35 points to go along with 7 rebounds, 6 assists and 2 steals on a 101–97 road win over the New York Knicks. In a game against the 55–8 Chicago Bulls, Iverson scored 37 points and memorably crossed over Michael Jordan. He broke Wilt Chamberlain's rookie record of three straight games with at least 40 points, doing so in five straight games, including a 50-point effort in Cleveland against the Cavaliers. Averaging 23.5 points per game, 7.5 assists per game and 2.1 steals per game for the season, Iverson was named the NBA Rookie of the Year. Iverson was only able to help the Sixers to a 22–60 record in 1996–97.

Aided by the arrivals of Theo Ratliff, Eric Snow, Aaron McKie, and new coach Larry Brown, Iverson continued to help the 76ers move forward the following season, as they improved nine games to finish 31–51. Snow's defensive ability allowed him to guard many opposing shooting guards, complementing the undersized Iverson, while McKie's versatility enabled him to back up both guard positions as the team's sixth man and Ratliff anchored the interior defense under Brown's guidance. His teammates revered him for his defense and ball-handling.

On January 26, 1999, Iverson signed a six-year, $70.9 million max contract extension. The lockout-shortened 1998–1999 season would mark great improvement for the 76ers. Iverson averaged 26.8 points (which led the league, earning his first scoring title) and was named to his first All-NBA First Team. The Sixers finished the season at 28–22, earning Iverson his first trip to the playoffs. He started all ten playoff games and averaged 28.5 points per game despite being hampered by a number of nagging injuries. Iverson led the Sixers to an upset over the number three seeded Orlando Magic in four games, before losing to the Indiana Pacers in the second round in six games.

During the 1999–2000 NBA season, the Sixers would continue to improve under Iverson's leadership, as they finished 49–33, once again qualifying for the playoffs (this time earning the fifth seed, one spot higher than the previous year's sixth seed). In the playoffs, Iverson averaged 26.2 points, 4.8 assists, 4 rebounds and 1.3 steals per game. Philadelphia would advance past the Charlotte Hornets in the opening round, but was eliminated by Indiana in the second round in six games for the second straight year.

That season, Iverson was selected to the Eastern Conference All-Star team for the first time of what would be 11 straight selections. He was the only player other than Shaquille O'Neal to receive an MVP vote that year. In the 2000 off-season, the 76ers actively tried to trade Iverson after his numerous disagreements with then-coach Larry Brown, and had agreed to terms with the Detroit Pistons before Matt Geiger, who was included in the deal, refused to forfeit his $5 million trade kicker.

==== MVP season and trip to the NBA Finals (2000–2001) ====
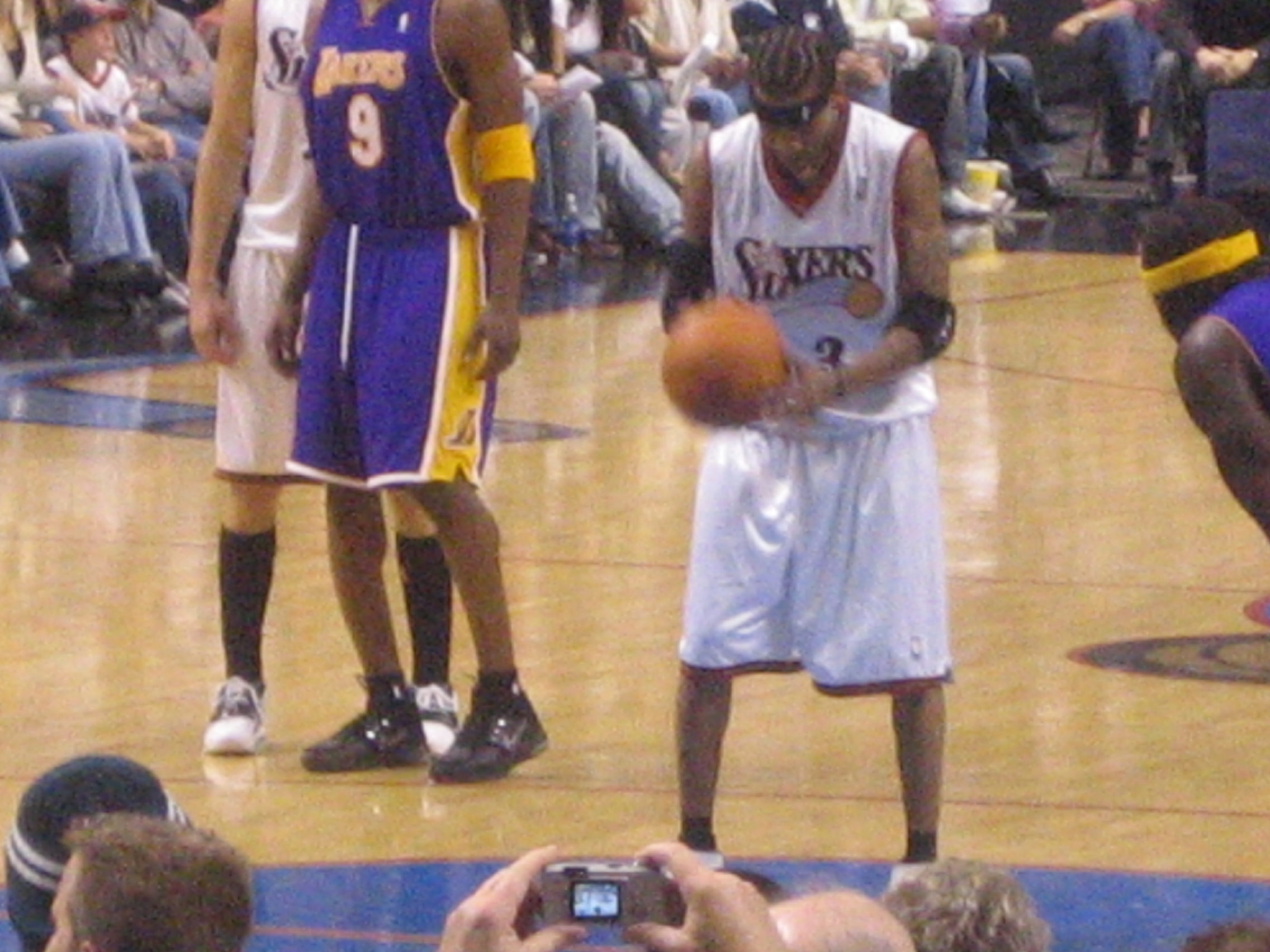
Iverson (pictured in 2005) shoots a free throw against the Los Angeles Lakers, the Lakers defeated Iverson's 76ers in the 2001 NBA Finals

During the 2000–01 season, Iverson led his team to a franchise record 10–0 start to the season, and was named a starter at the 2001 NBA All-Star Game, where he won the game MVP. The Sixers posted a 56–26 record on the season, the best in the Eastern Conference, earning the top seed. Iverson also averaged a then-career-high 31.1 points, winning his second NBA scoring title in the process. At the same time, Iverson won the NBA steals title with 2.5 a game. Iverson was named NBA Most Valuable Player; at 6 feet and 165 pounds, he became the shortest and lightest player to win the MVP award. He had 93 first-place votes out of a possible 124. He was also named to the All-NBA First team for his accomplishments. On top of Iverson's awards, recently acquired big man Dikembe Mutombo won NBA Defensive Player of the Year, fellow guard Aaron McKie won Sixth Man of the Year, and Larry Brown won the NBA Coach of the Year, all of which contributed hugely to the Sixers' success that year on top of Iverson. In the playoffs, Iverson and the Sixers defeated the Indiana Pacers in the first round, before meeting Vince Carter-led Toronto Raptors in the Eastern Semifinals. The series went the full seven games, though Philadelphia eventually prevailed. In the next round, the Sixers defeated the Milwaukee Bucks, also in seven games, to advance to the 2001 NBA Finals against the defending champion Los Angeles Lakers, featuring the duo of Kobe Bryant and Shaquille O'Neal.

Iverson led the Sixers to their first finals since their 1983 championship. In game one of the 2001 NBA Finals, Iverson scored a game-high 48 points and beat the heavily favored Lakers 107–101; it was the Lakers' only playoff loss that year. In the game, he notably stepped over Tyronn Lue after hitting a crucial shot. His 48 points remain the highest ever scored in an NBA Finals debut. Iverson would go on to score 23, 35, 35, and 37 in games 2–5, all losing efforts though the Sixers were not swept like many predicted. Iverson enjoyed his most successful season as an individual and as a member of the Sixers during the 2000–01 NBA season.

Iverson began using a basketball sleeve during this season during his recovery from bursitis in his right elbow. Other players, including Carmelo Anthony and Kobe Bryant, adopted the sleeves as well, as did fans who wore the sleeve as a fashion statement. Iverson continued wearing his sleeve long after his elbow had healed. Some believed that the sleeve improved Iverson's shooting ability. Steven Kotler of Psychology Today suggested that such sleeves may act as a placebo to prevent future injuries.

After the 2001 season came to a close, Allen Iverson decided to partner with Reebok and signed a 10-year $50 million contract. This contract also included $800,000 annually and access to a 32 million dollar trust fund when he turns 55.

==== Early playoff exits and Larry Brown's departure (2001–2003) ====
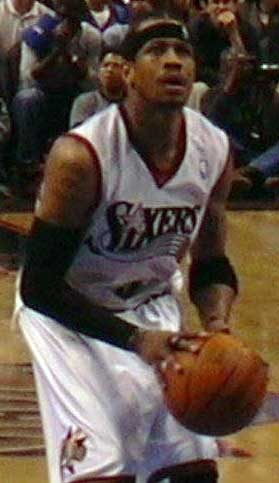
Iverson with the 76ers in 2003

Fresh off their trip to the NBA Finals, Iverson and the Sixers entered the 2001–2002 season with high expectations, but were plagued by injuries, and only able to muster a 43–39 record to barely get into the playoffs. Despite playing in only 60 games that season and being hampered by injuries, Iverson averaged 31.4 points per game to earn his second consecutive scoring title. The 76ers lost to the Boston Celtics in the first round of the playoffs 3–2 in the five-game series. After the defeat, Brown criticized Iverson for missing team practices. Iverson responded by saying, "We sittin' here, I'm supposed to be a franchise player, and we in here talkin' about practice," and went on a rant that included the word "practice" 22 times. He repeatedly said "We talkin' about practice. Not a game."

The 2002–2003 season started off poorly for the Sixers, who had just traded defensive-standout Dikembe Mutombo to New Jersey, and saw a decrease in both offensive and defensive production from Aaron McKie and Eric Snow, all three of whom were key components to their Finals appearance two years prior. Iverson would once again put up stellar scoring numbers (27.6 points per game) however, and the Sixers regrouped following the All-Star break to make the playoffs with a 48–34 record. They were able to defeat Baron Davis and the New Orleans Hornets in the opening round of the playoffs. Iverson later described Davis as the most difficult opposing point guard to defend in his career. In the six-game second round series, the 76ers were eliminated by the Detroit Pistons.

Head Coach Larry Brown left the 76ers in 2003, following the playoff loss. After his departure from the 76ers, both he and Iverson indicated that the two were on good terms and genuinely fond of one another. Iverson later reunited with Brown when Iverson became the co-captain of the 2004 United States men's Olympic basketball team. In 2005, Iverson said that Brown was without a doubt "the best coach in the world".

==== Disappointment and frustration (2003–2006) ====
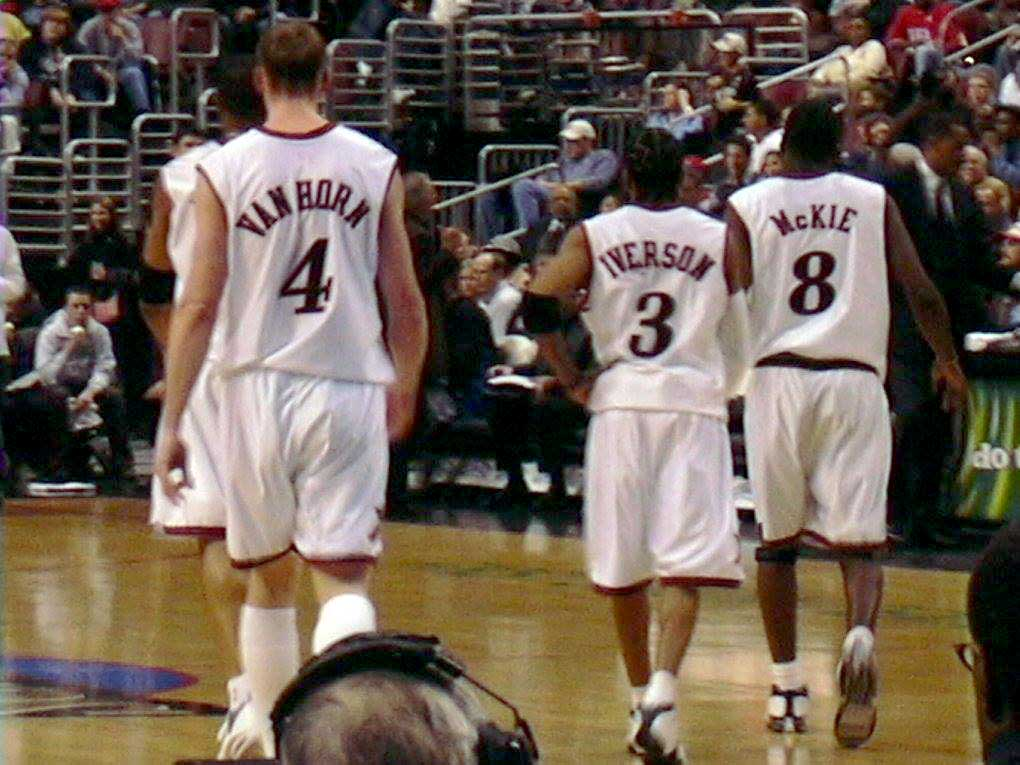
Iverson (center right) with the Philadelphia 76ers in a 2003 game

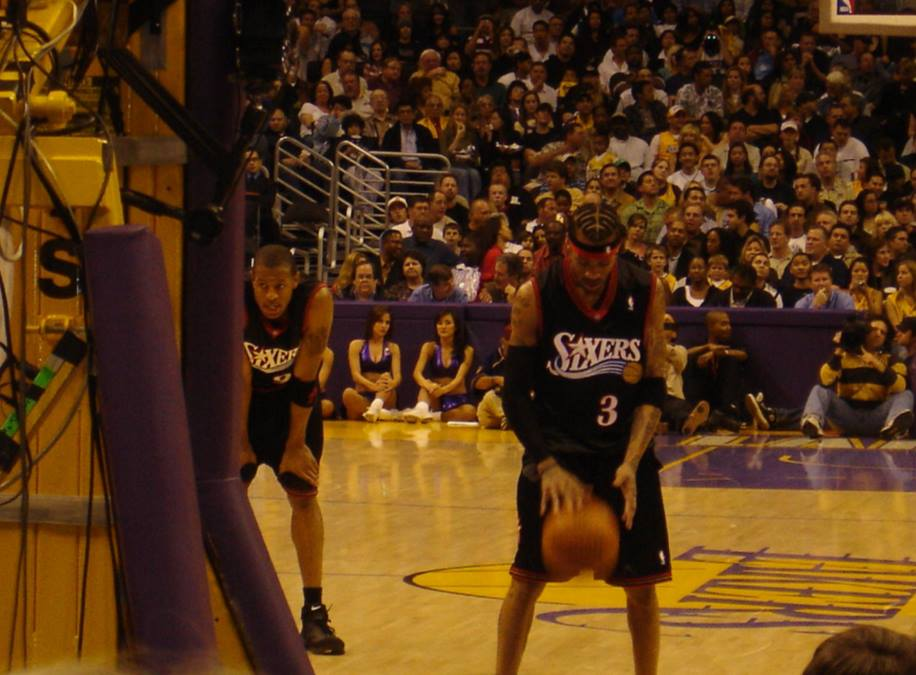
Iverson shoots a free throw in 2005

Prior to the start of 2003–04 season, Iverson signed a 4-year, $76.7 million contract extension which would begin in the 2005–06 season and last through the 2008-09 season.

Randy Ayers became the next coach of the 76ers, but failed to develop any chemistry with his players, and was fired following a 21–31 start to the season. During the latter part of the 2003–04 NBA season, Iverson bristled under the disciplinarian approach of the Sixers' interim head coach Chris Ford. This led to a number of contentious incidents, including Iverson being suspended for missing practice, fined for failing to notify Ford that he would not attend a game because he was sick, and refusing to play in a game because he felt "insulted" that Ford wanted Iverson to come off the bench as he worked his way back from an injury. Iverson missed a then-career-high 34 games in a disastrous season that saw the Sixers miss the postseason for the first time since 1998.

The 2004–2005 season saw Iverson and the Sixers bounce back under the tutelage of new head coach Jim O'Brien, and additions of their first round draft pick Andre Iguodala, and All-Star forward Chris Webber, who was acquired in a mid-season trade.

On February 12, 2005, Iverson scored a career-high 60 points on 24-for-27 shooting from the free throw line to go along with 6 assists and 5 steals in a 112–99 win over the Orlando Magic. On April 8, 2005, Iverson recorded 23 points, 7 rebounds and a career-high 16 assists in a 103–98 win over the Cleveland Cavaliers.

A rejuvenated Iverson won his fourth NBA scoring title with 31 points and averaged 8 assists for the year, and helped the 76ers climb back into the postseason with a 43–39 record. They would go on to lose to the eventual Eastern Conference champion Detroit Pistons, who were led by Larry Brown, in the first round. In the series, Iverson had three double-doubles, including a 37-point, 15-assist performance in Philadelphia's lone win of the series.

Despite O'Brien helping the team back into the postseason, disagreements with players and management led to his firing after just one season. He was replaced by Sixers' legend Maurice Cheeks, in a personnel move Iverson praised, as Cheeks had been an assistant coach with the team when they reached the NBA Finals in 2001. During the 2005–2006 season, Iverson averaged a career-high 33.0 points per game. The Sixers, however, missed the playoffs for the second time in three years.

On April 18, 2006, Iverson and Chris Webber arrived late to the Sixers' fan appreciation night and home game finale. Players were expected to report 90 minutes before game time, but both Iverson and Webber arrived around tipoff. Coach Maurice Cheeks notified the media that neither would be playing, and general manager Billy King announced that Iverson and Webber would be fined. During the 2006 off-season, trade rumors had Iverson going to Denver, Atlanta, or Boston. None of the deals were completed. Iverson had made it clear that he would like to stay a Sixer.

Iverson and the Sixers began the 2006–07 NBA season at 3–0 before stumbling out to a 5–10 record through 15 games. Following the disappointing start, Iverson reportedly demanded a trade from the Sixers (which he denied). As a result, Iverson was told he would not play in any more games. During the following game against the Washington Wizards, which was televised nationally on ESPN, Sixers Chairman Ed Snider confirmed the trade rumors by stating "We're going to trade him. At a certain point, you have to come to grips with the fact that it's not working. He wants out and we're ready to accommodate him."

Iverson ended his 10-year Philadelphia tenure with the highest scoring average in team history (28.1), and is second all-time on the points list (19,583), and the Sixers did not win another playoff series after his departure until 2012.

=== Denver Nuggets (2006–2008) ===
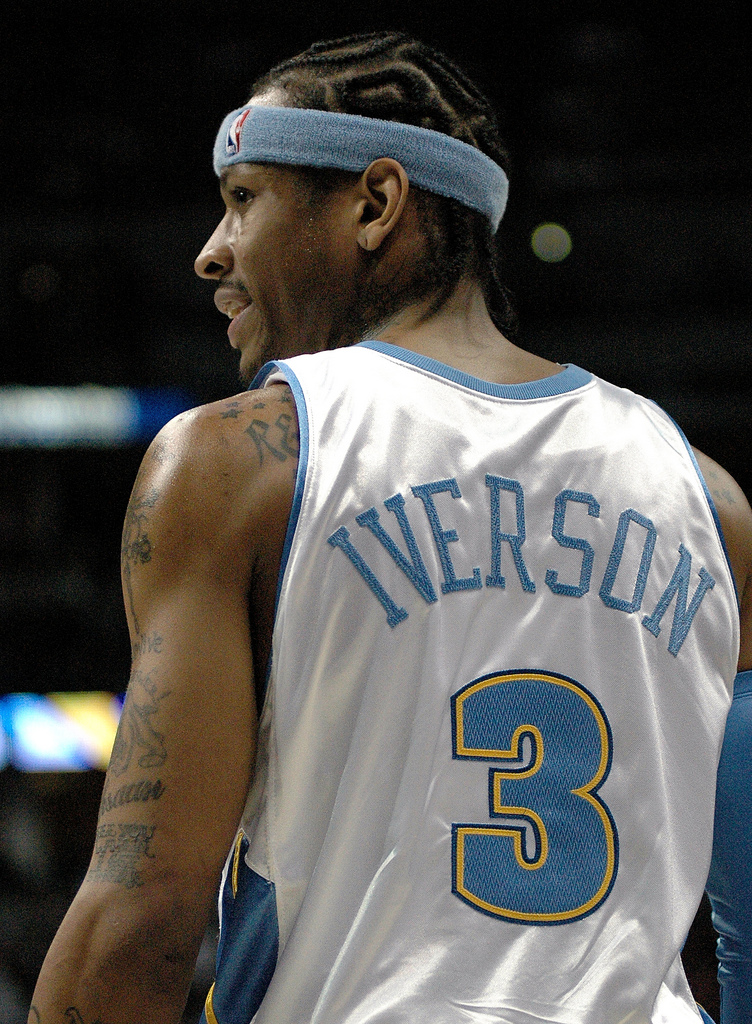
Iverson in January 2007 during his tenure with the Denver Nuggets

On December 19, 2006, the Philadelphia 76ers sent Iverson and forward Ivan McFarlin to the Denver Nuggets in exchange for Andre Miller, Joe Smith, and two first-round picks in the 2007 NBA draft. At the time of the trade, Iverson was the NBA's number two leading scorer, with new teammate Carmelo Anthony being number one.

On December 23, 2006, Iverson made his debut for the Nuggets. He had 22 points and 10 assists in a losing effort to the Sacramento Kings. In his first year as a Nugget, they made the playoffs as a sixth seed. In the First Round, they won the first game and lost the next four to the eventual NBA champion San Antonio Spurs.

Iverson was fined $25,000 by the NBA for criticizing referee Steve Javie following a game between the Nuggets and Iverson's former team, the Philadelphia 76ers, played January 2, 2007. During the game, he committed two technical fouls and was ejected from the game. After the game, Iverson said, "I thought I got fouled on that play, and I said I thought that he was calling the game personal I should have known that I couldn't say anything anyway. It's been something personal with me and him since I got in the league. This was just the perfect game for him to try and make me look bad."

Former referee Tim Donaghy supported the claim that Javie had a longstanding hatred for Iverson in his book, Personal Foul: A First-Person Account of the Scandal that Rocked the NBA, which a Florida business group published through a self-publishing arm of Amazon after it was dropped by a division of Random House, who cited liability issues after reviewing the manuscript.

In a December 2009 interview with 60 Minutes, Donaghy said he and fellow referees thought the punishment was too light. Before Iverson's Nuggets played the Utah Jazz on January 6, 2007, Donaghy said he and the two other officials working the game agreed not to give Iverson favorable calls as a way to "teach him a lesson." Iverson attempted 12 free throws, more than any other player on either team. On 12 drives to the basket, he drew five fouls, three of which Donaghy whistled himself, and did not receive a call on one play in which Utah's Mehmet Okur clearly fouled him.

Iverson returned to Philadelphia on March 19, 2008, to a sell-out crowd and received a standing ovation after scoring a game-leading 32 points in a 115–113 loss.

=== Detroit Pistons (2008–2009) ===
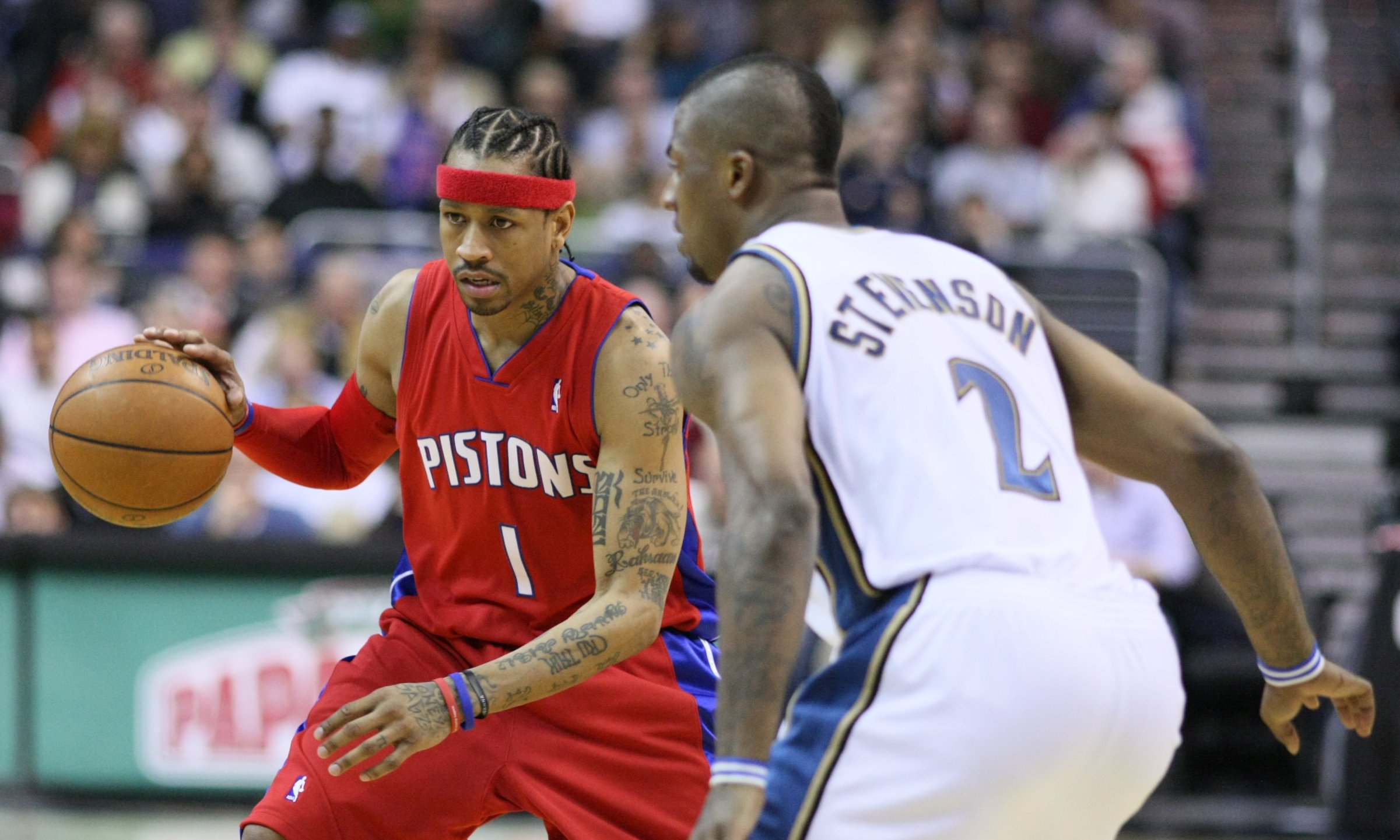
Iverson being guarded by DeShawn Stevenson in December 2008

On November 3, 2008, Iverson was dealt from the Denver Nuggets to the Detroit Pistons for guard Chauncey Billups, forward Antonio McDyess and center Cheikh Samb. Due to Rodney Stuckey already wearing Iverson's preferred #3 jersey, Iverson switched to number 1 for the Pistons, which Billups previously wore for the team.

Iverson scored at least 24 in four of his first five games with Detroit (they won 3 of the 5), and would score 20 or more with 6 or more assists on a consistent basis, but as the season wore on, he would lose playing time to Rodney Stuckey. Some speculated that Pistons President of Basketball Operations Joe Dumars did not envision a long-term role for Iverson on the team, but traded for him to make Stuckey the point guard of the future and free cap space with Iverson's expiring contract.

On April 3, 2009, it was announced that Iverson would not play the remainder of the 2008–09 season. Dumars cited Iverson's ongoing back injury as the reason for his deactivation, although two days prior Iverson stated publicly that he'd rather retire than be moved to the bench as Pistons coach Michael Curry had decided.

=== Memphis Grizzlies (2009) ===
On September 10, 2009, Iverson signed a one-year, $3.1 million contract with the Memphis Grizzlies. He stated that "God chose Memphis as the place that I will continue my career," and that "I feel that they are committed to developing a winner."

However, Iverson again expressed his displeasure at being a bench player, and left the team on November 7, 2009, for "personal reasons". On November 16, the Grizzlies announced the team terminated his contract by "mutual agreement". He played three games for the Grizzlies, averaging 13.3 ppg, 1.3 rpg, and 3.7 apg in 22.3 mpg.

=== Return to the 76ers (2009–2010) ===
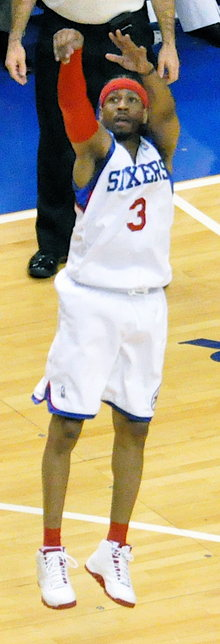
Iverson, during his second stint in Philadelphia, shoots a jump shot for the 76ers in 2010.

On November 25, 2009, analyst Stephen A. Smith published on his blog a statement attributed to Iverson announcing plans for retirement, which also said, "I feel strongly that I can still compete at the highest level."

Less than a week later on November 30, Iverson and his representatives met with a Philadelphia 76ers delegation about returning to his former team, and accepted a contract offer two days later. General manager Ed Stefanski declined to go into the terms of the agreement, but an unnamed source told the Associated Press that Iverson agreed to a one-year non-guaranteed contract at the league minimum salary. Iverson would receive a prorated portion of the $1.3 million minimum salary for players with at least 10 years of experience, and the contract would become guaranteed for the remainder of the 2009–10 season if he remained on the roster on January 8, 2010. Stefanski said the team made the decision to pursue Iverson after starting guard Lou Williams suffered a broken jaw and was expected to miss at least 30 games.

On December 7, 2009, Iverson made his return to Philadelphia, garnering a thunderous ovation from the sold-out crowd, in a loss against his former team, the Denver Nuggets. He finished the game with 11 points, 6 assists, 5 rebounds, a steal, and no turnovers. Iverson's first win in his return to Philadelphia came one week later, in a 20-point effort against the Golden State Warriors, ending the Sixers' 12-game losing streak (which stood at 9 games before Iverson returned). He shot 70 percent from the field in the game.

On January 3, 2010, he returned to Denver to face the Nuggets; Iverson scored 18 points and had seven assists in the 108–105 win. He was voted as a starter for the All-Star Game for the 11th straight season. He scored a season-high 25 points (on 56% shooting from the field) in a 99–91 loss to Kobe Bryant and the defending champion Lakers.

On February 22, 2010, Iverson left the 76ers indefinitely, citing the need to attend to his 4-year-old daughter Messiah's health issues, which he revealed years later as Kawasaki Disease. On March 2, Stefanski announced Iverson would not return to the 76ers for the rest of the season to deal with the personal matter. His final NBA game was a road loss against Derrick Rose and the Chicago Bulls on February 20, 2010.

=== Beşiktaş (2010–2011) ===
On October 26, 2010, Yahoo! Sports reported that Iverson agreed in principle to a two-year, $4 million net income contract with Beşiktaş, a Turkish Super League team competing in the second-tier level of pan-European professional basketball, the EuroCup, the competition level below the EuroLeague level. The club announced the signing at a press conference in New York City, on October 29, 2010. Wearing jersey No. 4, Iverson made his debut for Beşiktaş on November 16, 2010, in a EuroCup 91–94 loss to Serbian side Hemofarm. Iverson scored 15 points in 23 minutes.

Iverson returned to the United States in January 2011 for calf surgery. He only played ten games for Beşiktaş that season, and did not play professional basketball after that.

=== Official retirement ===
In January 2013, Iverson received an offer to play for the Texas Legends of the NBA D-League, but he declined.

On October 30, 2013, Iverson announced his retirement from basketball, citing that he lost his desire to play. At the 76ers' 2013–14 season home opener that night, he received a standing ovation at the beginning of the second quarter. The news conference at which he announced his retirement was attended by former Georgetown coach John Thompson and Sixers great Julius Erving. Iverson said he would always be a Sixer "until I die," and that while he always thought the day he retired would be a "tough" day, he instead stated it was rather a "happy" day.

In November 2013, the 76ers announced that they would officially retire Iverson's number 3 in a special halftime ceremony on March 1, 2014, when the Sixers hosted the Washington Wizards. The ceremony took place in front of 20,000 spectators and 76ers greats such as Julius Erving, Moses Malone, and former team president Pat Croce. He headlined the Naismith Memorial Basketball Hall of Fame Class of 2016 along with Shaquille O'Neal and Yao Ming. Iverson highlighted John Thompson and Larry Brown when speaking to the media on who he credited for a Hall of Fame career.

In 2017, the creation of the 3-on-3 professional basketball league BIG3 was announced, with Iverson set to be a player and coach on 3's Company. In March, it was announced that Iverson's co-captain would be DerMarr Johnson. 3's Company drafted Andre Owens, Mike Sweetney, and Ruben Patterson during the 2017 BIG3 Draft. On June 25, 3's Company played its first game of the inaugural BIG3 season against the Ball Hogs. In the game, Iverson scored 2 points on 1-for-6 shooting in 9 minutes of play. On only playing 9 minutes, Iverson stated, "I signed up to be a coach, player and captain. Coach part is going to go on throughout the game. Playing part is not going to be what you expect. You're not going to see the Allen Iverson of old out there."

== National team career ==
=== 1995 World University Games ===
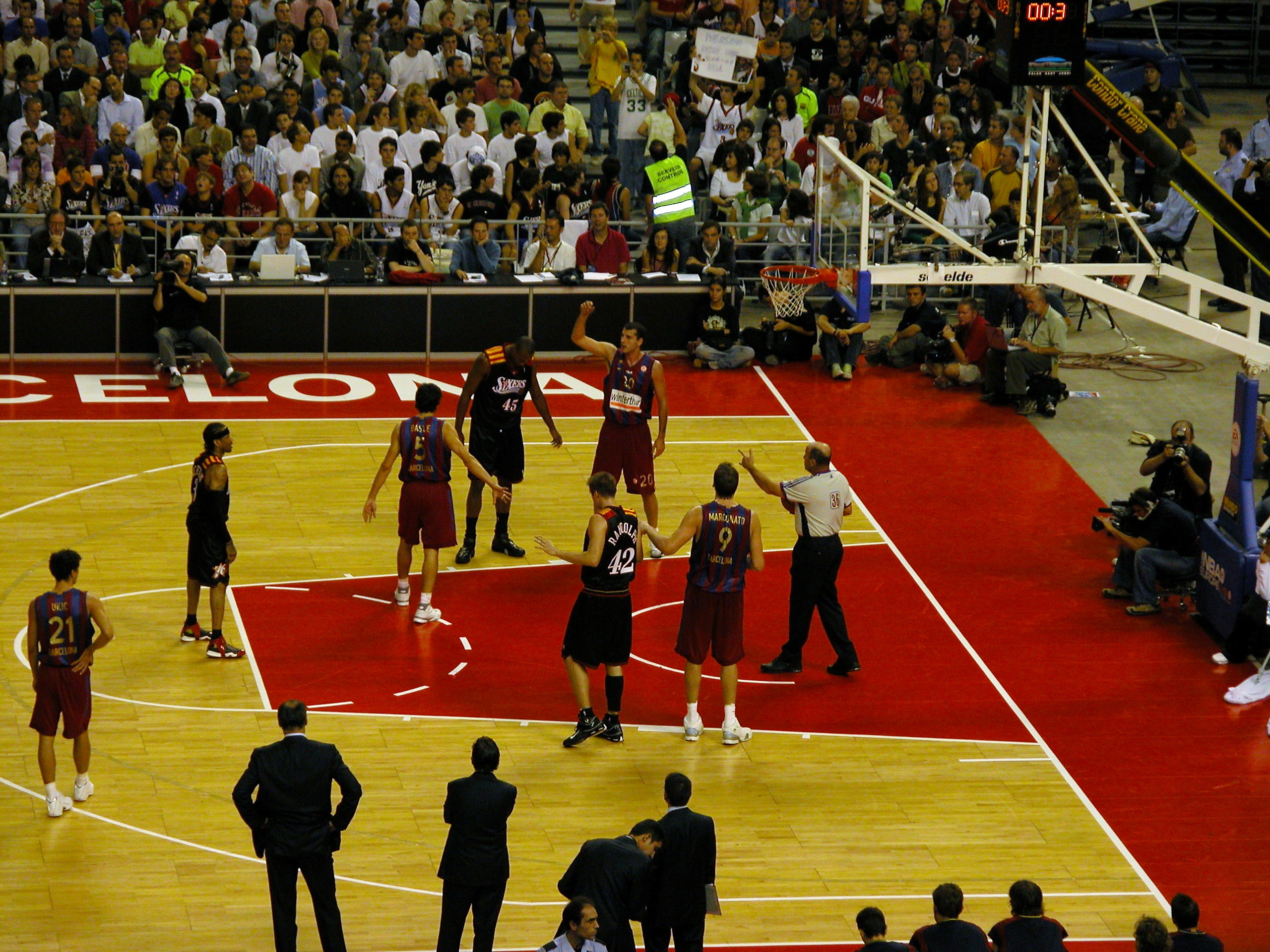
Iverson during an October 2006 game against Barcelona

Iverson was a member of the USA World University Games Team in Japan in 1995, that included future NBA stars Ray Allen and Tim Duncan, and others. Iverson led all USA players in scoring, assists, and steals, averaging 16.7 points, 6.1 assists, and 2.9 steals per game. He helped lead the team to an undefeated record en route to a 141–81 victory over the host country, Japan, for the gold medal.

=== 2003 FIBA Americas championship ===
Iverson was selected to be part of Team USA for the 2003 FIBA Americas Olympic Qualifying Tournament in Puerto Rico in August of that year. USA had a perfect 10–0 record, and won the gold medal as well as qualifying for a berth in the 2004 Olympics. Iverson started all eight games that he played in, and was second on the team with 14.3 points per game, while also posting 3.8 assists per game, 2.5 rebounds per game, 1.6 steals per game, and shooting 56.2 percent (41–73 FGs) from the field, 53.6 percent (15–28 3pt FGs) from 3-point and 81.0 percent (17–21 FTs) from the foul line.

In the USA's 111–71 victory over Canada on August 25, he accounted for a USA Olympic Qualifying single-game record 28 points and made a single-game record seven 3-pointers. Playing just 23 minutes, he shot 10-for-13 overall, 7-for-8 from the 3-point line, 1-for-1 from the foul line and added three assists, three steals, and one rebound. All seven of his 3-point field goals were made during the final 7:41 of the third quarter.

He finished the tournament ranked overall tied for 10th in scoring, tied for fourth in steals, fifth in 3-point percentage, tied for seventh in assists, and ninth in field goal percentage (.562). Iverson also missed the USA's final two games because of a sprained right thumb which was suffered in the first half of the August 28 Puerto Rico game. In a game against Puerto Rico, he recorded 9 points on 4-for-6 shooting from the field overall, and added five assists and three rebounds in 26 minutes of action in the USA's 101–74 exhibition game victory on August 17 in New York. He was also named to the 2003 USA Senior National Team on April 29, 2003.

== Career statistics ==
=== NBA ===
Legend
GP	Games played	GS	Games started	MPG	Minutes per game
FG%	Field goal percentage	3P%	3-point field goal percentage	FT%	Free throw percentage
RPG	Rebounds per game	APG	Assists per game	SPG	Steals per game
BPG	Blocks per game	PPG	Points per game	**Bold**	Career high
*	Led the league

==== Regular season ====
Year	Team	GP	GS	MPG	FG%	3P%	FT%	RPG	APG	SPG	BPG	PPG
1996–97	Philadelphia	76	74	40.1	.418	.341	.702	4.1	7.5	2.1	**.3**	23.5
1997–98	Philadelphia	80	80	39.4	.461	.298	.729	3.7	6.2	2.2	**.3**	22.0
1998–99	Philadelphia	48	48	41.5*	.412	.291	.751	**4.9**	4.6	2.3	.1	26.8*
1999–00	Philadelphia	70	70	40.8	.421	.341	.713	3.8	4.7	2.1	.1	28.4
2000–01	Philadelphia	71	71	42.0	.420	.320	.814	3.8	4.6	2.5*	**.3**	31.1*
2001–02	Philadelphia	60	59	**43.7***	.398	.291	.812	4.5	5.5	**2.8***	.2	31.4*
2002–03	Philadelphia	**82**	**82***	42.5*	.414	.277	.774	4.2	5.5	2.7*	.2	27.6
2003–04	Philadelphia	48	47	42.5*	.387	.286	.745	3.7	6.8	2.4	.1	26.4
2004–05	Philadelphia	75	75	42.3	.424	.308	.835	4.0	**7.9**	2.4	.1	30.7*
2005–06	Philadelphia	72	72	43.1*	.447	.323	.814	3.2	7.4	1.9	.1	**33.0**
2006–07	Philadelphia	15	15	42.7*	.413	.226	**.885**	2.7	7.3	2.2	.1	31.2
2006–07	Denver	50	49	42.4*	.454	.347	.759	3.0	7.2	1.8	.2	24.8
2007–08	Denver	**82***	**82***	41.8*	.458	.345	.809	3.0	7.1	2.0	.1	26.4
2008–09	Denver	3	3	41.0	.450	.250	.720	2.7	6.7	1.0	**.3**	18.7
2008–09	Detroit	54	50	36.5	.416	.286	.786	3.1	4.9	1.6	.1	17.4
2009–10	Memphis	3	0	22.3	**.577**	**1.000**	.500	1.3	3.7	.3	.0	13.3
2009–10	Philadelphia	25	24	31.9	.417	.333	.824	3.0	4.1	.7	.1	15.9
Career		914	901	41.1	.425	.313	.780	3.7	6.2	2.2	.2	26.7
All-Star		9	9	26.6	.414	.667	.769	2.6	6.2	2.3	.1	14.4

==== Playoffs ====
Year	Team	GP	GS	MPG	FG%	3P%	FT%	RPG	APG	SPG	BPG	PPG
1999	Philadelphia	8	8	44.8	.411	.283	.712	4.1	4.9	2.5	.3	28.5
2000	Philadelphia	10	10	44.4	.384	.308	.739	4.0	4.5	1.2	.1	26.2
2001	Philadelphia	**22**	**22**	46.2	.389	.338	.774	**4.7**	6.1	2.4	.3	**32.9**
2002	Philadelphia	5	5	41.8	.381	.333	.810	3.6	4.2	**2.6**	.0	30.0
2003	Philadelphia	12	12	46.4	.416	.345	.737	4.3	7.4	2.4	.1	31.7
2005	Philadelphia	5	5	**47.6**	**.468**	**.414**	**.897**	2.2	**10.0**	2.0	**.4**	31.2
2007	Denver	5	5	44.6	.368	.294	.806	.6	5.8	1.4	.0	22.8
2008	Denver	4	4	39.5	.434	.214	.697	3.0	4.5	1.0	.3	24.5
Career		71	71	45.1	.401	.327	.764	3.8	6.0	2.1	.2	29.7

=== Turkey ===
==== BSL ====
Year	Team	GP	GS	MPG	FG%	3P%	FT%	RPG	APG	SPG	BPG	PPG
2010–2011	Beşiktaş	7	-	31.4	.438	.429	.730	2.7	4.7	1.7	.0	14.3

==== EuroCup ====
Year	Team	GP	GS	MPG	FG%	3P%	FT%	RPG	APG	SPG	BPG	PPG
2010–2011	Beşiktaş	4	-	25.0	.400	.571	.667	2.5	2.5	1.3	.0	11.5

=== College ===
Year	Team	GP	GS	MPG	FG%	3P%	FT%	RPG	APG	SPG	BPG	PPG
1994–95	Georgetown	30	29	32.2	.390	.232	.688	3.3	4.5	3.0	.2	20.4
1995–96	Georgetown	37	37	32.8	.480	.366	.678	3.8	4.7	3.4	.4	25.0
Career		67	66	32.5	.440	.314	.683	3.6	4.6	3.2	.3	23.0

== Post-basketball career ==
Iverson works with Reebok and is the Vice President of Basketball, following his lifetime partnership with the brand. In this role, he is involved in player recruitment, community initiatives, and athlete activations, working alongside Shaquille O’Neal, who serves as Reebok's president of basketball.

== Personal life ==
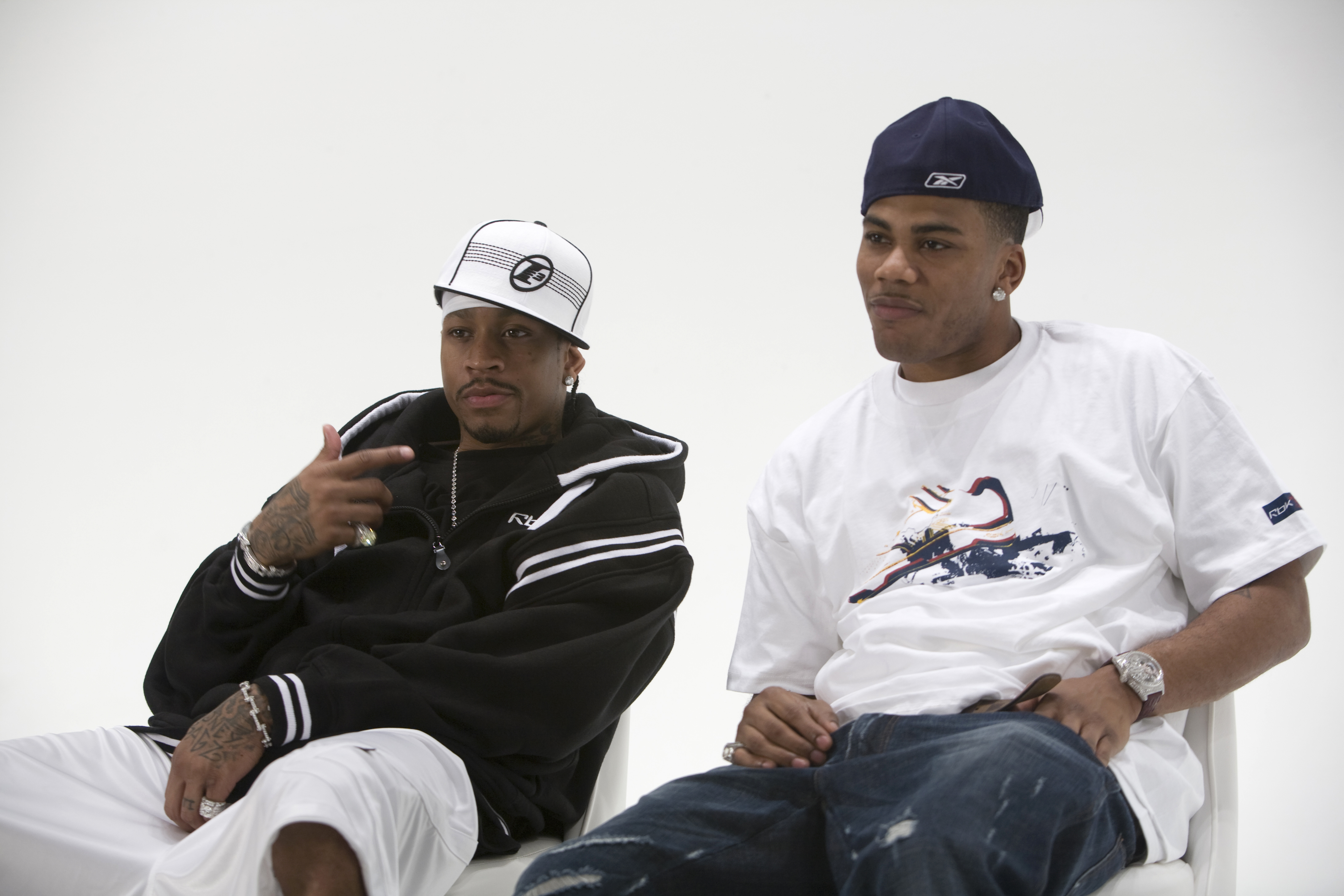
Iverson and rap star Nelly at a Reebok photoshoot in September 2007

Iverson has three younger half-siblings: Brandy (b. 1979), Ieisha (b. 1990), and Mister (b. 2003).

During the 2000 offseason, Iverson recorded a rap single called "40 Bars". However, after being criticized for its controversial lyrics, he eventually was unable to release it. Going under his moniker, Jewelz, the album was alleged to have made derogatory remarks about homosexuals. After criticism from activist groups and NBA Commissioner David Stern, he agreed to change the lyrics, but ultimately never released the album.

Iverson had an on-again, off-again relationship with rapper Da Brat. Da Brat claimed she ended the relationship due to Iverson's infidelity.

On May 14, 2015, Iverson appeared on CBS This Morning in support of a Showtime Network documentary on his life, Iverson, during which he addressed long-discussed rumors of financial struggles, denying any notion that he was struggling. "That's a myth. That's a rumor... The fact that I'm struggling in any part of my life", he said.

In 2021, Iverson and former NBA player Al Harrington announced a business partnership through which a line of cannabis products would be launched named "The Iverson Collection". Iverson will also aid in the development of various business initiatives for the company that Harrington founded, Viola Brands. The pair will also collaborate on educational efforts to reduce stigma surrounding cannabis use.

In October 2023, Iverson was named Reebok's Vice President of Basketball, with Shaquille O'Neal named as the President of Basketball.

Iverson is an admirer of quarterback Josh Allen. Iverson appeared in the Buffalo Bills' 2025 schedule release video as part of a gag in which Allen recommends that general manager Brandon Beane "use AI" to create a schedule release video, to which Beane misinterprets "AI" as meaning Iverson (and not generative AI) and recruits Iverson to take part in the video.

=== Legal troubles ===
In August 1997, during the offseason, Iverson and his friends were stopped by a police officer for speeding late at night. He was arrested for carrying a concealed weapon and for possession of marijuana. He pleaded no contest and was sentenced to community service.

In 2002, Iverson was alleged to have thrown his wife Tawanna out of their home after a domestic dispute and later threatening two men with a gun while looking for her. All charges against him were later dropped after the judge cited lack of evidence with contradictory statements from witnesses.

On February 24, 2004, Iverson urinated in a trash can at Bally's Atlantic City casino and was told by casino management not to return.

On December 9, 2005, after the Sixers defeated the Charlotte Bobcats, Iverson paid a late-night visit to the Trump Taj Mahal in Atlantic City. After winning a hand at a three-card-stud poker table, Iverson was overpaid $10,000 in chips by a dealer. When the dealer quickly realized the mistake and requested the chips back, Iverson refused, and a heated head-turning argument between him and the casino staff began. Atlantic City casino regulations reportedly state that when a casino makes a payout mistake in favor of the gambler, the gambler must return the money that they did not legitimately win.

Also in 2005, Iverson's bodyguard Jason Kane was accused of assaulting a man at a Washington, D.C. nightclub after the man, Marlin Godfrey, refused to leave the club's VIP section so Iverson's entourage could enter. Godfrey suffered a concussion, a ruptured eardrum, a burst blood vessel in his eye, a torn rotator cuff, cuts and bruises, and emotional distress. Although Iverson did not touch Godfrey himself, Godfrey sued Iverson for the injuries caused by his bodyguard. In 2007, a jury awarded Godfrey $260,000. In March 2009, the United States Court of Appeals for the District of Columbia Circuit upheld the verdict on appeal.

In August 2011, an Ohio man sued Iverson for $2.5 million in damages, claiming Iverson's security guard assaulted him in a 2009 bar fight in Detroit. The federal judge dismissed the case, finding no evidence that Iverson or his bodyguard struck the plaintiff, Guy Walker.

In 2013, Iverson was accused of kidnapping his children and refusing to return them to their mother. He denied the claim and his ex-wife later recanted.

=== Marriage and family ===
Iverson started dating his high school sweetheart Tawanna Turner when they were 16, and married her in August 2001 at The Mansion on Main Street in Voorhees, New Jersey. They have five children: Tiaura, Allen II, Isaiah, Messiah, and Dream.

On March 2, 2010, Tawanna Iverson filed for divorce, seeking custody of their children, child support, and alimony payments. According to Iverson, the couple were back together less than a month after the divorce was finalized in 2013.

Iverson's cousin, Kuran Iverson, is also a basketball player.

== Legacy ==
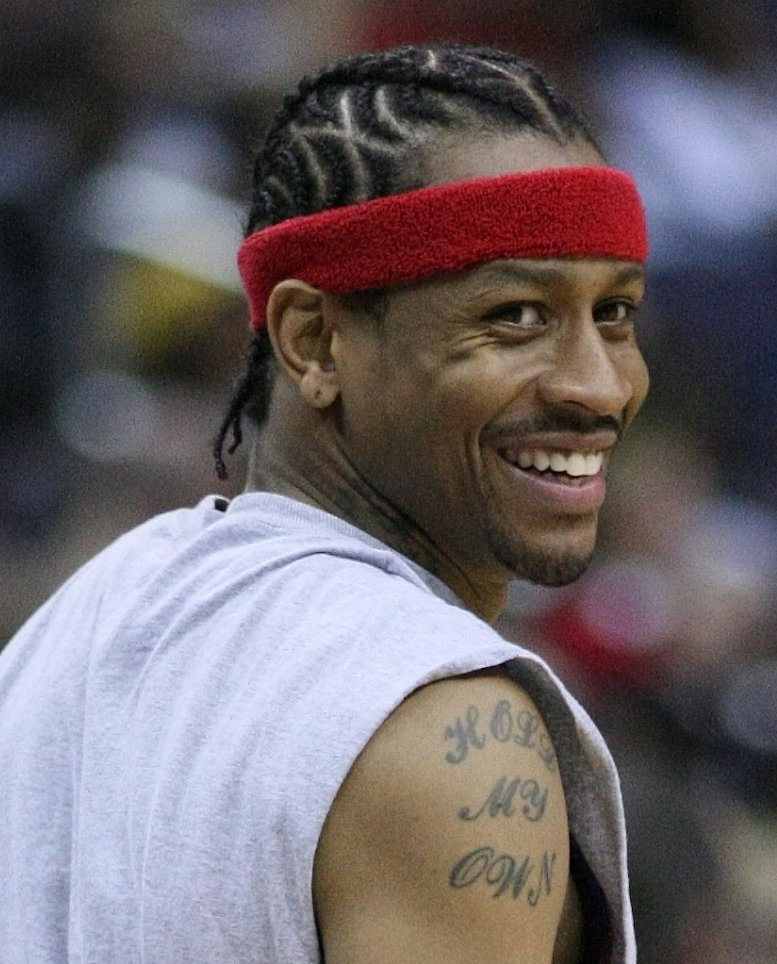
Iverson wearing his signature cornrows in 2008

Several media outlets credit Iverson with transforming the culture of the NBA and American sports culture as a whole with his mainstream introduction of the cornrow hairstyle, the marriage of rap music with basketball, and being among the first in promoting non-ceremonial tattoos in popular culture. In 2024, 76ers unveiled a statue of Iverson outside their practice facility. Recognizing Iverson's investments in his hometown, the city of Newport News named a street "Allen Iverson Way" and governor of Virginia Glenn Youngkin declared March 5 to be Allen Iverson Day.

On August 14, 2015, American singer Post Malone released the song "White Iverson". The song debuted on the Billboard Hot 100 at number 14, and would hit over a billion streams on Spotify and a billion views on YouTube. Allen responded to the song when it received a billion streams on Spotify: "Congrats on 1 billion Spotify streams. The whole world loves this song and I'm honored to be a part of it. Keep that same form, Post."

== Awards and honors ==
- NBA Most Valuable Player: 2001
- 11× NBA All-Star: 2000–2010
- 2× NBA All-Star Game MVP: 2001, 2005
- 7× All-NBA Team selections:
  - 3x First Team: 1999, 2001, 2005
  - 3x Second Team: 2000, 2002, 2003
  - Third Team: 2006
- 4× NBA scoring champion: 1999, 2001, 2002, 2005
- 3× NBA free throw scoring leaders: 2002, 2005, 2006
- 7× NBA minutes played leaders: 1999, 2002, 2003, 2004, 2006, 2007, 2008
- 3× NBA steals leader: 2001-2003
- NBA Rookie of the Year: 1997
- Rising Stars Challenge MVP: 1997
- No. 3 retired by the Philadelphia 76ers
- Naismith Memorial Basketball Hall of Fame
  - Class of 2016 – Individual

== Filmography ==
- Like Mike (2002) – as himself
- Imagine That (2009) – as himself
- My Other Home (2017)
- Hustle (2022) as himself
- Allen Iv3rson (2025) as himself

== See also ==
- List of NBA career scoring leaders
- List of NBA career free throw scoring leaders
- List of NBA career assists leaders
- List of NBA career steals leaders
- List of NBA career turnovers leaders
- List of NBA single-game scoring leaders
- List of NBA single-game steals leaders
- List of NBA single-game playoff scoring leaders
- List of NBA annual scoring leaders
- List of NBA annual minutes leaders
- List of NBA rookie single-season scoring leaders
