= 2019–20 Alba Berlin season =

Alba Berlin
2019–20 season
- President: Dieter Hauert
- Head coach: Aíto García Reneses
- Marco Baldi: Marco Baldi
- Arena: Mercedes-Benz Arena
- Basketball Bundesliga: Scheduled
- EuroLeague: Scheduled
Home	Away
- All statistics correct as of 20 July 2019.

The 2019–20 Alba Berlin season will be the 28th season in the existence of the club. The club will play in the Basketball Bundesliga (BBL) and EuroLeague. It will be the third season under head coach Aíto García Reneses, who extended his contract on 8 August 2019. Alba returned to the EuroLeague after an absence of 5 years, after finishing second in the 2018–19 BBL season.

== Players ==
=== Squad information ===
Alba Berlin roster
Players
Coaches

Pos.	No.	Nat.	Name	Ht.	Age
PG	3	(United States)	Siva, Peyton	1.82 m (6 ft 0 in)	35 – 24 October 1990
SF	5	(Germany)	Giffey, Niels	2.01 m (6 ft 7 in)	34 – 8 June 1991
G/F	8	(Sweden)	Eriksson, Marcus	2.01 m (6 ft 7 in)	31 – 5 December 1993
G	9	(Germany)	Mattisseck, Jonas	1.95 m (6 ft 5 in)	25 – 16 January 2000
PF	10	(Germany)	Schneider, Tim	2.08 m (6 ft 10 in)	28 – 1 September 1997
G/F	25	(Germany)	Ogbe, Kenneth	1.98 m (6 ft 6 in)	30 – 16 November 1994
C	32	(Germany)	Thiemann, Johannes	2.05 m (6 ft 9 in)	31 – 9 February 1994
PF	34	(United States)	Cavanaugh, Tyler	2.06 m (6 ft 9 in)	31 – 9 February 1994
PF	43	(United States)	Sikma, Luke	2.03 m (6 ft 8 in)	36 – 30 July 1989
PG	44	(Serbia)	Peno, Stefan	1.98 m (6 ft 6 in)	28 – 3 August 1997

Head coach

- (Spain) Aíto García Reneses

Assistant coach(es)

- (Spain) Israel González

Legend

- (C) Team captain
- (DP) Development player
- Injured

- Roster
Updated: 10 August 2019

=== Depth chart ===
Pos.	Starting 5	Bench 1	Bench 2
C	Johannes Thiemann
PF	Luke Sikma	Tyler Cavanaugh	Tim Schneider
SF	Niels Giffey	Kenneth Ogbe
SG	Marcus Eriksson	Jonas Mattisseck
PG	Peyton Siva	Stefan Peno

=== Transactions ===
==== In ====
No.	Pos.	Nat.	Name	Age	Moving from		Type	Ends	Date	Source
1	PG	(Germany)	Makai Mason	24	University of Baylor	(United States)	Free	2021	8 July 2019	
8	SG	(Sweden)	Marcus Eriksson	25	Gran Canaria	(Spain)	Free	2023	20 July 2019	
34	PF	(United States)	Tyler Cavanaugh	25	Salt Lake City Stars	(United States)	Free	2020	20 July 2019	

==== Out ====
No.	Pos.	Nat.	Name	Age	Moving to		Type	Date	Source
1	PG	(Germany)	Joshiko Saibou	29	Telekom Baskets Bonn	(Germany)	Free	1 July 2019	
7	PG	(United States)	Derrick Walton Jr.	24	Los Angeles Clippers	(United States)	Free	1 July 2019	
22	F	(Germany)	Franz Wagner	17	University of Michigan	(United States)	Free	1 July 2019	
27	C	(United States)	Dennis Clifford	27	Igokea	(Bosnia and Herzegovina)	Free	1 July 2019	
