= Eurocup Basketball 2010–11 Regular Season Group B =

Standings and results for Group B of the regular season phase of the 2010–11 Eurocup basketball tournament.

== Standings ==
Key to colors
Top two places in each group advanced to Last 16

	Team	Pld	W	L	PF	PA	Diff
1.	(Germany) BG Göttingen	6	4	2	478	442	+36
2.	(Serbia) KK Hemofarm	6	3	3	496	512	−16
3.	(France) ASVEL Basket	6	3	3	494	506	−12
4.	(Turkey) Beşiktaş Cola Turka	6	2	4	516	524	−8

Source: Euroleague Basketball

== Fixtures and results ==
All times given below are in Central European Time.

=== Game 1 ===
16 November 2010
18:30

Report

Beşiktaş Cola Turka (Turkey)	91–94	(Serbia) KK Hemofarm
Scoring by quarter: 24–14, 20–21, 25–28, 22–31
Pts: Ogilvy 20; Rebs: Ogilvy 12; Asts: Çetin 5		Pts: Mačvan 17; Rebs: Mačvan 15; Asts: Abdul-Hamid, Krstović 4

BJK Akatlar Arena
Attendance: 3,000
Referees: Christos Christodoulou (GRE), Miroslav Tomov (BUL), Omer Esteron (ISR)

16 November 2010
20:30

Report

ASVEL Basket (France)	80–88	(Germany) BG Göttingen
Scoring by quarter: 15–28, 21–14, 21–26, 23–20
Pts: Walsh 30; Rebs: Three players 8 Asts: Hammonds 5		Pts: Anderson 20; Rebs: Anderson 8 Asts: Mecham 6

Astroballe
Attendance: 3,054
Referees: Grzegor Ziemblicki (POL), Apostolos Kalapakas (SWE), Tomas Trawicki (POL)

=== Game 2 ===
23 November 2010
18:00

Report

KK Hemofarm (Serbia)	97–93	(France) ASVEL Basket
Scoring by quarter: 24–18, 24–21, 30–22, 19–32
Pts: Three players 13; Rebs: Borisov 8 Asts: Mačvan 8		Pts: Hammonds 25; Rebs: Walsh 8 Asts: Žižić, Gelabale 5

Millennium Center
Attendance: 2,500
Referees: Carl Jungebrand (FIN), Elias Koromilas (GRE), Jurgis Laurinavicius (LTU)

16 December 2010
19:00

Report

BG Göttingen (Germany)	81–69	(Turkey) Beşiktaş Cola Turka
Scoring by quarter: 19–18, 26–17, 17–13, 19–21
Pts: Meacham 31; Rebs: Scott, Boone; Asts: Meacham 4		Pts: Ignerski 20; Rebs: Likholitov 8 Asts: Erden 3

Lokhalle
Attendance: 3,200
Referees: Luis Lopes (POR), Nicola Maestre (FRA), Joseph Bissang (FRA)

=== Game 3 ===
30 November 2010
19:30

Report

BG Göttingen (Germany)	68–57	(Serbia) KK Hemofarm
Scoring by quarter: 20–13, 12–15, 19–21, 17–8
Pts: Anderson 17; Rebs: Anderson 13; Asts: Meacham 5		Pts: Mačvan 16; Rebs: Savović 8 Asts: Pavković 3

Lokhalle
Attendance: 2,247
Referees: Paolo Taurino (ITA), Marcin Kowalski (POL), Seffi Shemmesh (ISR)

30 November 2010
20:30

Report

ASVEL Basket (France)	88–85	(Turkey) Beşiktaş Cola Turka
Scoring by quarter: 26–27, 14–19, 16–18, 32–21
Pts: Walsh 23; Rebs: Jefferson 10; Asts: Walsh 7		Pts: Ignerski 22; Rebs: Ogilvy 11; Asts: Chatman 7

Astroballe
Attendance: 0
Referees: Miguel Angel Perez Niz (ESP), Francisco Arana (ESP), Sergio Silva (POR)

=== Game 4 ===
7 December 2010
18:00

Report

KK Hemofarm (Serbia)	67–79	(Germany) BG Göttingen
Scoring by quarter: 15–25, 21–19, 12–18, 19–17
Pts: Mačvan 17; Rebs: Savović 5 Asts: Šutalo, Hamid 4		Pts: Anderson, Scott 26; Rebs: Scott 9 Asts: Scott 5

Millennium Center
Attendance: 2,400
Referees: Roberto Chiari (ITA), Nikola Lepetic (MNE), Alfred Jovovic (CRO)

7 December 2010
18:30

Report

Beşiktaş Cola Turka (Turkey)	80–74	(France) ASVEL Basket
Scoring by quarter: 12–21, 21–18, 18–18, 29–17
Pts: Özer 15; Rebs: Likholitov 9 Asts: Chatman 8		Pts: Žižić 17; Rebs: Walsh 14; Asts: Walsh 11

BJK Akatlar Arena
Attendance: 1,500
Referees: Paolo Taurino (ITA), Roman Kolar (SLO), Moritz Reiter (GER)

=== Game 5 ===
14 December 2010
18:00

Report

KK Hemofarm (Serbia)	101–100 (OT)	(Turkey) Beşiktaş Cola Turka
Scoring by quarter: 20–25, 25–22, 25–24, 19–18, Overtime: 12–11
Pts: Savović 23; Rebs: Mačvan 9 Asts: Krstović 4		Pts: Chatman 43; Rebs: Likholitov 11; Asts: Çetin 4

Millennium Center
Attendance: 3,000
Referees: Fabio Facchini [ITA], Boris Shulga [UKR], Ioannis Foufis [GRE]

14 December 2010
19:30

Report

BG Göttingen (Germany)	76–78	(France) ASVEL Basket
Scoring by quarter: 22–22, 17–14, 19–13, 18–29
Pts: Kulawick 13; Rebs: Boone 12; Asts: Meacham 9		Pts: Jefferson 22; Rebs: Jefferson 10; Asts: Walsh 7

Lokhalle
Attendance: 2,239
Referees: Christos Christodoulou (GRE), Marko Juras (SRB), Miroslav Tomov (BUL)

=== Game 6 ===
21 December 2010
20:00

Report

Beşiktaş Cola Turka (Turkey)	91–86 (OT)	(Germany) BG Göttingen
Scoring by quarter: 24–18, 20–21, 16–12, 19–28, Overtime: 12–7
Pts: Özer 27; Rebs: Chatman 7 Asts: Chatman 9		Pts: Meeks 17; Rebs: Waleskowski 10; Asts: Meacham 11

BJK Akatlar Arena
Attendance: 450
Referees: Spiros Gkontas (GRE), Sergiy Chebyshev (UKR), Oskars Lucis (LAT)

21 December 2010
20:00

Report

ASVEL Basket (France)	81–80	(Serbia) KK Hemofarm
Scoring by quarter: 27–21, 16–14, 20–24, 18–21
Pts: Walsh 21; Rebs: Walsh 9 Asts: Walsh, Hammonds 4		Pts: Anđušić 20; Rebs: Savović 10; Asts: three players 3

Astroballe
Attendance: 4,631
Referees: Antonio Conde (ESP), Apostolos Kalpakas (SWE), Carmelo Lo Guzzo (ITA)
