= Christos Tapoutos =

Greek professional basketball player

Christos Tapoutos Χρήστος Ταπούτος
Aris Thessaloniki
- Title: Team manager
- League: GBL

Personal information
- Born: September 21, 1982 (age 44) Thessaloniki, Greece
- Listed height: 6 ft 9 in (2.06 m)
- Listed weight: 240 lb (109 kg)

Career information
- Playing career: 1999–2017
- Position: Power forward / small forward

Career history
- 1999–2001: Near East
- 2001–2004: AEK Athens
- 2004–2005: Iraklis
- 2005–2006: Panionios
- 2006–2009: AEK Athens
- 2009–2010: PAOK Thessaloniki
- 2010–2012: Aris Thessaloniki
- 2012: ČEZ Nymburk
- 2012–2014: Olin Edirne
- 2014–2015: Afyon
- 2015: Panionios
- 2015–2016: Kavala
- 2016–2017: Doxa Lefkadas
Medals
Men's basketball
Representing Greece
Mediterranean Games
| Silver medal – second place | 2001 Tunis | Under-26 |
| Silver medal – second place | 2005 Almería | Under-26 |
FIBA Europe Under-20 Championship
| Gold medal – first place | 2002 Lithuania | Under-20 |
Albert Schweitzer Tournament
| Silver medal – second place | 2000 Mannheim | Under-18 |
FIBA Europe Under-18 Championship
| Bronze medal – third place | 2000 Zadar |

Christos Tapoutos (Greek: Χρήστος Ταπούτος; born September 21, 1982) is a Greek former professional basketball player and current basketball executive. At a height of 2.06 m (6 ft 9 in) tall, he played at both the small forward and power forward positions, with power forward being his main position. During his early professional years, Tapoutos was considered to be one of the greatest scorers and talents in his age group in all of Europe.

== Professional career ==
Tapoutos started his career with Achilleas Triandrias in 1998 in the Greek minors. In 1999, he joined Near East, where he played for two seasons, before transferring to AEK Athens, where he played until 2004. He then moved to Iraklis for the 2004–05 season, and then to Panionios for the 2005–06 season, before returning to AEK Athens for another three seasons. Tapoutos then played with PAOK, before joining Aris. In June 2012, he left Aris and joined ČEZ Nymburk for the 2012–13 season, but during the season he left ČEZ Basketball and moved to Olin Edirne.

On 20 January 2015, he returned to Panionios. He spent the 2015–16 season with Kavala. He joined Doxa Lefkadas in 2016. He retired from playing professional basketball in 2017.

== National team career ==
With the Greek junior national teams, Tapoutos won a bronze medal at the 2000 FIBA Europe Under-18 Championship. He was the second leading scorer of the 2002 FIBA Europe Under-20 Championship Qualifying Round in July 2001, averaging 27.0 points per game. He also played at the 2002 FIBA Europe Under-20 Championship, where he won a gold medal. He also won silver medals at the 2001 Mediterranean Games and the 2005 Mediterranean Games, while playing with Greece's under-26 national selection.

Tapoutos was also a member of the senior men's Greek national basketball team. He debuted with the senior men's Greek national team on June 14, 2002, against Italy. With Greece's senior men's team, he had 13 caps and scored 80 points, for a scoring average of 6.2 points per game.

== Awards and accomplishments ==
=== Greek junior national team ===
- 2000 FIBA Europe Under-18 Championship: Bronze
- 2000 Albert Schweitzer Tournament: Silver
- 2000 Albert Schweitzer Tournament: All-Tournament Team
- 2001 Mediterranean Games: Silver
- 2002 FIBA Europe Under-20 Championship: Gold
- 2005 Mediterranean Games: Silver

=== Pro career ===
- 3× Greek League All-Star: (2001, 2004, 2011)
- Named the "Most Spectacular Player in Greece" and "Most Spectacular Player in Europe" runner-up, out of all players in his age group, by Basket News: (2001)
- Greek League Champion: (2002)
