= Jonas Mattisseck =

German basketball player (born 2000)

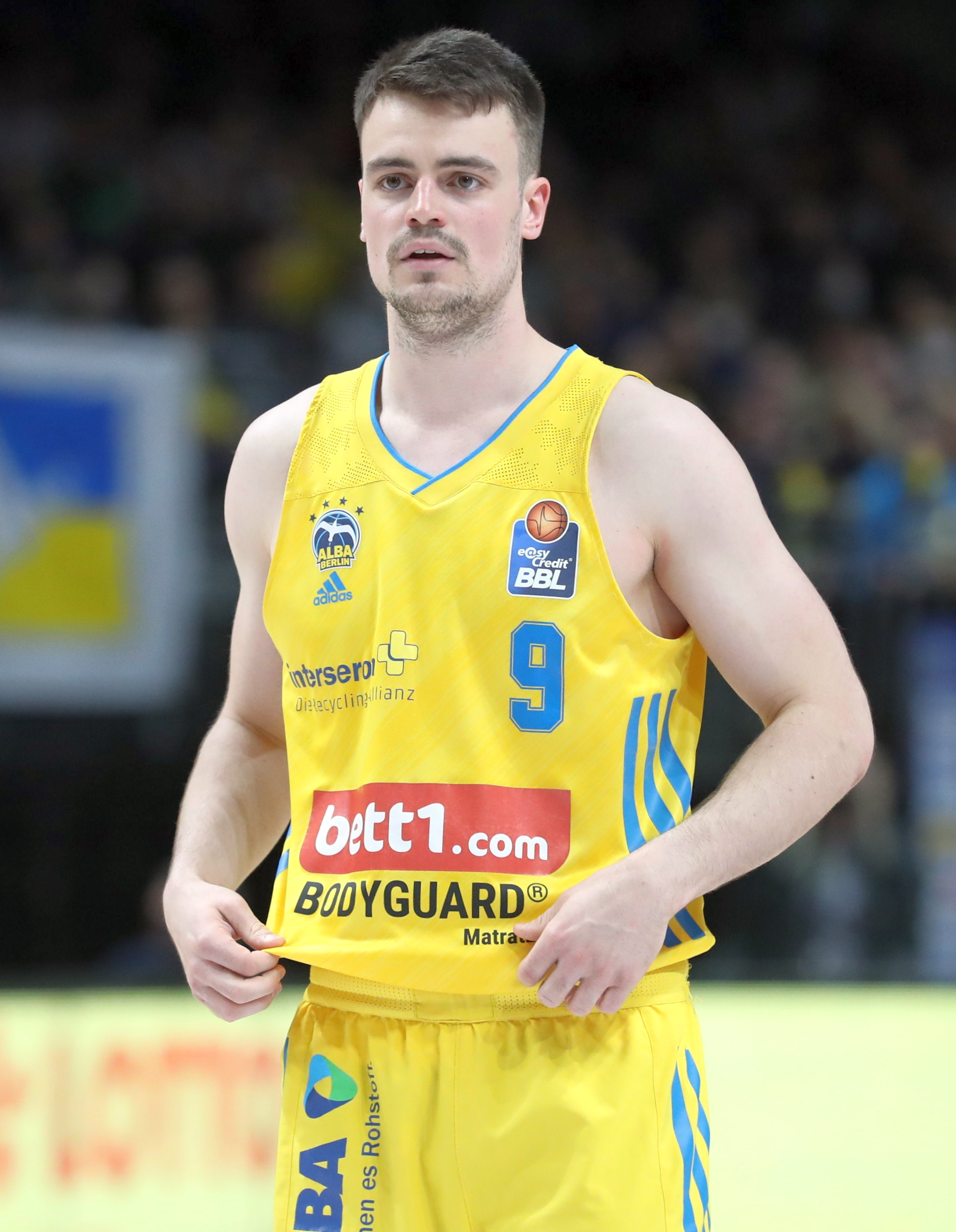

No. 9 – Alba Berlin
- Position: Shooting guard
- League: BBL

Personal information
- Born: 16 January 2000 (age 26) Berlin, Germany
- Listed height: 1.93 m (6 ft 4 in)
- Listed weight: 84 kg (185 lb)

Career history
- –2015: VfL Lichtenrade
- 2015–2016: TuS Lichterfelde
- 2016–present: Alba Berlin
- 2017–2019: →SSV Lokomotive Bernau

Career highlights
- 4× Bundesliga champion (2020–2022, 2026); 2× German Cup winner (2020, 2022); AST World Under-18 Tournament MVP (2018)
Medals
Men's basketball
Representing Germany
FIBA U20 European Championship
Bronze medal – third place	2019 Israel	Team
AST World Under-18 Tournament
Gold medal – first place	2018 Germany	Team

Jonas Mattisseck (born 16 January 2000) is a German professional basketball player for Alba Berlin of the German Basketball Bundesliga (BBL). He plays the shooting guard position.

== Professional career ==
Mattisseck began his career in the youth system of German club VfL Lichtenrade. Heading toward the 2015–16 season, Mattisseck moved to the youth club of TuS Lichterfelde for a year, before signing with Alba Berlin.

Prior to the 2017–18 season, Mattisseck was loaned to second division side SSV Lokomotive Bernau. Initially intended to only be a supplementary player with SSV Lokomotive Bernau, Mattisseck impressed, and caught the attention of Alba Berlin head coach Aíto García Reneses. Mattisseck would make it into Alba Berlin's extended roster, for Euro and German Cup competitions in January 2018.

After eventually making his Bundesliga debut in March 2018, Mattisseck would later help the Alba Berlin U19 team win the junior championship. He would be named MVP, and best defender at the end of the tournament.

In February 2020, Mattisseck helped Alba Berlin win the German Cup. At the end of the season, he would win his first Bundesliga title with the club.

Three years later, in June 2023, Mattisseck signed a new contract with Alba Berlin through the 2025–26 season. On 13 May 2026, Mattisseck signed a two-year extension with the club through the summer of 2028.

== National team career ==
Mattisseck's first chance to represent Germany at international level, came at the 2016 FIBA U16 European Championship. During the event with the Germany U16 national team, he would contribute with averages of 9.6 points, 4.7 rebounds and 2.9 assists. The following year, he would be named to the Germany U18 national team, for the 2017 FIBA U18 European Championship. He finished the tournament with averages of 12 points, 1.9 rebounds and 3 assists per game.

A year later, Mattisseck was named the MVP of the 2018 Albert Schweitzer World Under-18 Tournament, after he led Germany to the competition's gold medal. Also in 2018, Mattisseck was once again named to the U18 national team, for the 2018 FIBA U18 European Championship. He completed the event leading the team in scoring (10.3) and assists (2.7) per game.

In February 2019, Mattisseck was selected to the senior Germany national team for the first time, for Germany's final two matches of their 2019 FIBA World Cup qualifying campaign. A few months later, Mattisseck was named to the Germany U20 national team, that won bronze at the 2019 FIBA U20 European Championship in July. He produced averages of 12 points, 2.7 rebounds and 2.6 assists during the competition. Four years later, in July 2023, Mattisseck was chosen to play in an international U23 tournament with Germany.

== Personal life ==
Since 2019, Mattisseck has been in a relationship with German figure skater, Minerva Fabienne Hase, who attended the same high school as him.

== Career statistics ==
Legend
GP	Games played	GS	Games started	MPG	Minutes per game
FG%	Field-goal percentage	3P%	3-point field-goal percentage	FT%	Free-throw percentage
RPG	Rebounds per game	APG	Assists per game	SPG	Steals per game
BPG	Blocks per game	PPG	Points per game	PIR	Performance index rating
**Bold**	Career high

=== EuroLeague ===
*	Led the league

Year	Team	GP	GS	MPG	FG%	3P%	FT%	RPG	APG	SPG	BPG	PPG	PIR
2019–20	Alba Berlin	28*	7	13.7	.343	.340	.818	1.0	.8	.4	—	2.7	1.8
2020–21	Alba Berlin	**31**	**9**	**13.8**	.376	.359	.875	1.1	**.9**	.4	—	3.0	2.1
2021–22	Alba Berlin	26	3	13.7	.393	.341	.833	**1.3**	.5	.5	—	2.4	1.8
2022–23	Alba Berlin	16	1	12.4	.368	.345	**1.000**	.8	**.9**	**.6**	—	2.5	1.8
2023–24	Alba Berlin	26	2	12.2	**.412**	**.434**	**1.000**	.6	.5	.3	—	**3.3**	**2.4**
Career		127	22	13.3	.379	.367	.882	1.0	.7	.4	—	2.8	2.0

=== EuroCup ===
Year	Team	GP	GS	MPG	FG%	3P%	FT%	RPG	APG	SPG	BPG	PPG	PIR
2017–18	Alba Berlin	3	0	7.7	.250	.000	**1.000**	.7	.7	—	—	1.7	1.0
2018–19	Alba Berlin	**5**	0	**14.0**	**.619**	**.636**	.571	**.8**	**2.6**	**.8**	—	**7.4**	**8.0**
Career		8	0	9.1	.517	.438	.625	.8	1.9	.5	—	5.3	5.4

=== Domestic leagues ===
Year	Team	League	GP	MPG	FG%	3P%	FT%	RPG	APG	SPG	BPG	PPG
2017–18	(Germany) Lok. Bernau	ProB	20	24.4	.419	.357	.733	2.1	4.0	1.3	.1	8.6
2017–18	(Germany) Alba Berlin	BBL	5	7.6	.417	.375	.500	.8	1.4	.8	—	3.4
2018–19	(Germany) Lok. Bernau	ProB	21	24.8	.429	.339	.698	2.6	3.4	1.5	.0	11.9
2018–19	(Germany) Alba Berlin	BBL	15	12.4	.333	.433	.750	1.3	1.7	.6	—	3.6
2019–20	(Germany) Alba Berlin	BBL	29	16.4	.406	.427	.815	.9	1.2	.7	.0	4.8
2020–21	(Germany) Alba Berlin	BBL	36	14.9	.326	.299	.667	1.1	1.2	.4	.1	3.6
2021–22	(Germany) Alba Berlin	BBL	41	14.5	.392	.385	.731	1.3	.7	.6	.0	3.8
2022–23	(Germany) Alba Berlin	BBL	33	16.0	.466	.467	.870	1.4	1.0	.3	.0	5.2
2023–24	(Germany) Alba Berlin	BBL	43	15.7	.335	.304	.889	1.6	1.0	.7	.0	4.6
