= Jason Boone =

American basketball player

Personal information
- Born: October 8, 1985 (age 41) Sugar Loaf, New York, U.S.
- Listed height: 6 ft 6 in (1.98 m)

Career information
- High school: Warwick Valley (Warwick, New York)
- College: NYU (2003–2007)
- NBA draft: 2007: undrafted
- Playing career: 2007–2019
- Position: Power forward / center
- Number: 21

Career history
- 2007–2008: SSV Lokomotive Bernau
- 2008–2011: BG Göttingen
- 2011–2014: S.Oliver Würzburg
- 2014–2015: Konya Selcuk
- 2015: SO Maritime Boulogne
- 2015–2017: MHP Riesen Ludwigsburg
- 2017: Start Lublin
- 2017–2018: CSA Steaua București
- 2018–2019: SCM U Craiova

Jason Gregory Boone (born October 8, 1985) is an American retired professional basketball player.

== Career ==
=== High School and College ===
Boone attended Warwick Valley High School from 2001 to 2003. He played 45 games, compiling a total of 725 points. In his senior year, Boone was presented with the WVHS – C. Ashley Morgan Male Athlete of The Year Award. He was also a football player at Warwick Valley High. In February 2020, he was inducted into the Warwick High School Boys Basketball Hall of Fame.

Following graduation in 2003, Boone played at NCAA Division 3 school New York University. He appeared in 104 career games at NYU, averaging 12.7 points, 8.1 rebounds, 2.0 blocked shots and 1.6 assists per game. As a senior in 2006–07, Boone was NYU's second-leading scorer (14.1ppg), while also leading the Violets in rebounding (9.6rpg) and blocks (2.4bpg). He earned D3hoops.com All-America Third Team honors that year. During his college career, Boone also garnered 2006 All-University Athletic Association Player of the Year and 2006 and 2007 All-University Athletic Association First Team distinction.

=== Professional ===
Boone started his professional career with SSV Lokomotive Bernau of Germany's third-tier Regionalliga. "I was making less than $1,000 a month. I was out there experiencing it, enjoying it and I was able to say I lived abroad", he told recordonline.com in 2010. In the course of his first year in Germany, he was picked up by BG Göttingen of the country's top-flight Basketball Bundesliga, after Göttingen's Ben Jacobson, a former University of Northern Iowa player, had convinced Göttingen's head coach John Patrick to bring in Boone. Jacobson and Boone had earlier played on an NIT summer all-star team together. Boone would stay in Göttingen until 2011. Thanks to his physical presence in the paint and his outgoing personality, he became a fan favorite. In 2010, he helped Göttingen capture the FIBA EuroChallenge title, averaging 10.7 points and 6.8 rebounds during the title run.

In 2011, Boone followed Coach John Patrick to fellow Bundesliga side S.Oliver Würzburg. Statistically, his best season in the Bundesliga came in 2012–13, when he averaged 10.1 points a game in 34 contests. Following a three-year stint, Boone took his game to Turkey and France, before returning to Germany in 2015. At Ludwigsburg, he again played under Coach Patrick. In February 2017, Boone exercised an option to leave Ludwigsburg and accepted an offer from Polish first-division side Start Lublin, where he played for the remainder of the 2016–17 campaign.

In July 2017, Boone inked a deal with CSA Steaua București of the Romanian top-flight Liga Națională. In the Romanian league, Boone scored at a 7.7 points per game clip during 19:04 minutes of action per outing (20 games), while grabbing 4.8 rebounds a contest in the 2017–18 season. In August 2018, he helped "Team k1x Germany" win the "Jump10" tournament in Shanghai. He retired at the conclusion of the 2018–19 season, which he had spent with Romanian team SCM U Craiova. Boone subsequently moved to Los Angeles and started a career in marketing. He later settled in Nashville, Tennessee, working as a client growth director for a relationship building platform and serving as an ambassador of mental health and wellness.
