= Fedor Likholitov =

Russian basketball player

Personal information
- Born: March 14, 1980 (age 46) St. Petersburg, Russian SFSR, Soviet Union
- Listed height: 6 ft 11 in (2.11 m)
- Listed weight: 257 lb (117 kg)

Career information
- College: VCU (1998–2002)
- NBA draft: 2002: undrafted
- Playing career: 2002–2015
- Position: Center

Career history
- 2002: SIG Strasbourg
- 2002–2004: Aris Thessaloniki
- 2004–2006: Dynamo Moscow
- 2006–2008: Triumph Lyubertsy
- 2008–2009: Ural Great
- 2009: UNICS Kazan
- 2009–2011: Beşiktaş
- 2011–2012: Krasnye Krylia
- 2013: Krasny Oktyabr
- 2013–2014: Avtodor Saratov
- 2014–2015: Krasny Oktyabr

Career highlights
- EuroCup champion (2006); EuroCup Challenge champion (2003); Russian Cup winner (2012); Greek Cup winner (2004); 2× CAA All-Defensive team (2001, 2002)

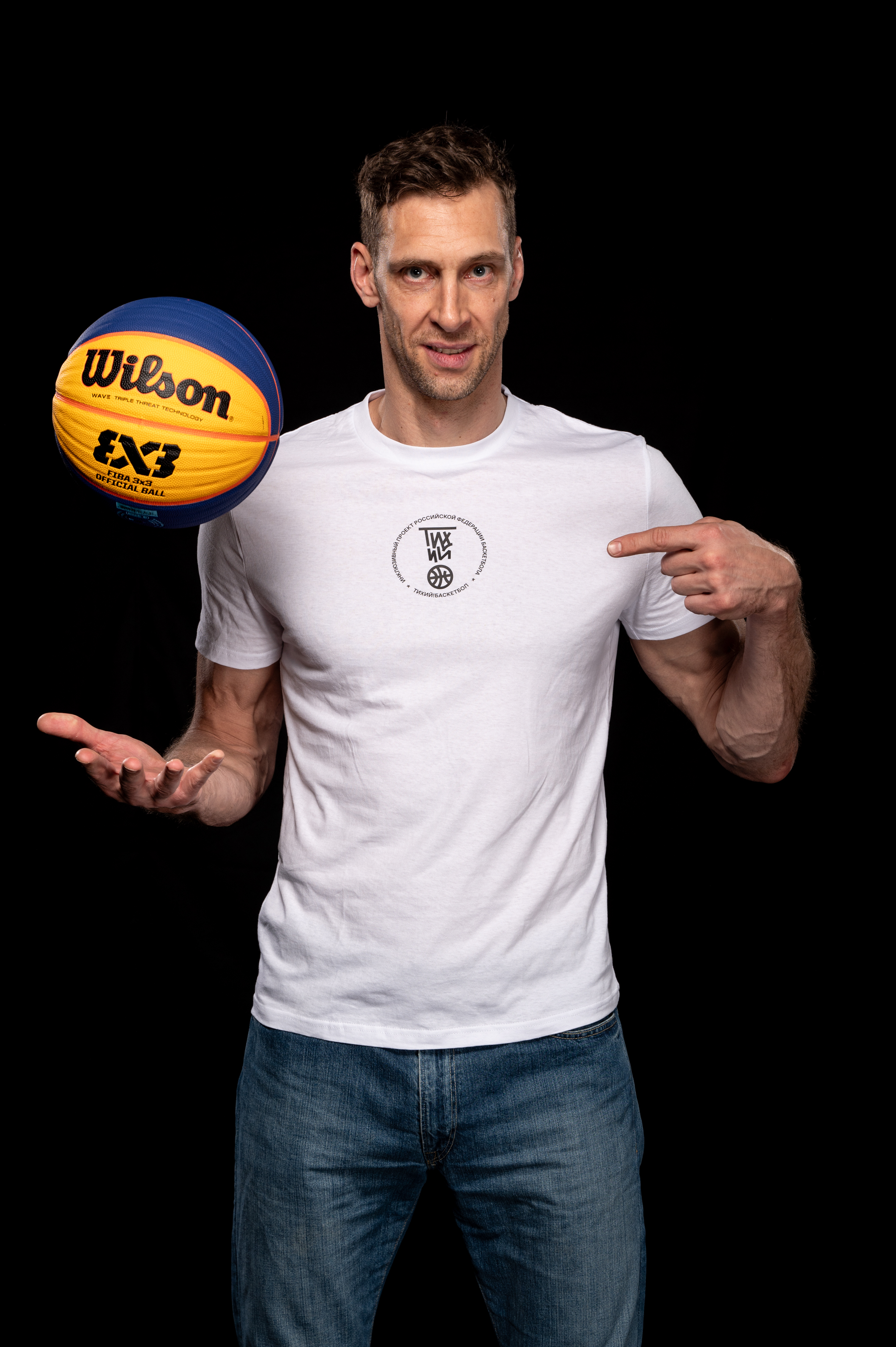
Fyodor Likholitov

Fedor "L.F." Likholitov (Russian: Фёдор Лихолитов; born March 14, 1980) is a Russian former professional basketball player. He is a power forward – center who most recently played for Krasny Oktyabr in VTB United League.

== College career ==
After playing youth club basketball with Baltika St. Petersburg, in Russia, Likholitov played college basketball at Virginia Commonwealth University, with the VCU Rams, from 1998 to 2002.

== Professional career ==
In late April 2002, Likholitov moved to France to play professionally, and he was signed by SIG Strasbourg. He moved to Greece for the 2002–03 season, and was signed by Aris Thessaloniki. He played there also the 2003–04 championship. He moved to Russia for the 2004–05 season, where he signed with Dynamo Moscow and played there also the 2005–06 championship. He was signed for the 2006–07 season by Dynamo Moscow Region, and he played there also the 2007–08 season though the team has changed its name to Triumph Lyubertsy. Likholitov signed for the 2008–09 season with Ural Great Perm, and signed for the 2009–10 season by UNICS Kazan. In December 2009, he moved to Turkey and signed with Beşiktaş. In July 2011, he returned to Russia and signed with Krasnye Krylia. He later also played with Avtodor Saratov and Krasny Oktyabr, before finishing his pro career in 2015.

== National team career ==
Likholitov was also a member of the senior Russian national basketball team. With Russia, he played at the 2003 EuroBasket and the 2005 EuroBasket.
