= 2021 FIBA U16 European Challengers =

Tournament details
- Dates: 16–21 August 2021
- Teams: 31
- Venues: 5 (in 5 host cities)

Official website
- www.fiba.basketball

The 2021 FIBA U16 European Challengers were international basketball competitions which took place from 16 to 21 August 2021, replacing the cancelled 2021 FIBA U16 European Championship. Top two teams from groups A, B and C qualified for the 2022 FIBA Under-17 Basketball World Cup.

== History ==
The 2020 edition of FIBA U16 European Championship was to be held in Skopje, North Macedonia but was postponed to 2021 due to COVID-19 pandemic. Since the pandemic continued in 2021, the FIBA Europe decided to hold alternative format of competition to replace traditional format of U16 European Championship where 16 or more teams gather in one place.

== Structure ==
- The events are to be played on a voluntary participation basis, with promotion/relegation to be frozen across Divisions A, B and C.
- The Top 18 ranked teams (16 currently in Division A, plus two additional teams by 2019 ranking in respective category) to play three tournaments of six teams each (Groups A, B and C).
- All other registered teams, ranked 19 and lower, to play in tournaments of up to six teams each (Groups D/E).
- One tournament of up to six teams to be created with the lowest-ranked teams to accommodate Division C and Small Countries (Group F).
- All tournaments to be played in Round Robin format, with groups to be created by "serpentine" style allocation, taking the hosting situation into consideration.

== Participating teams ==
Top-18 Challengers

- Belgium
- Bulgaria
- Croatia
- Czech Republic
- France
- Germany
- ~~Greece~~ (withdrawn)
- Israel
- Latvia
- Lithuania
- ~~North Macedonia~~ (withdrawn)
- Poland
- Romania
- Russia
- Serbia
- Slovenia
- ~~Spain~~ (withdrawn)
- Turkey

19–25 Challenger

- Cyprus
- Georgia
- Hungary
- Portugal
- Slovakia
- Switzerland
- Ukraine

26–31 Challenger

- Albania
- Gibraltar
- Kosovo
- Luxembourg
- Malta
- Moldova

== Top-18 Challengers ==
=== Group A ===
The Group A tournament was played in Skopje, North Macedonia. Greece and North Macedonia withdrew from the tournament. After the first round, all four teams advanced to the playoffs.

==== Group phase ====
Pos	Team	Pld	W	L	PF	PA	PD	Pts
1	France	3	3	0	254	147	+107	6
2	Russia	3	2	1	192	173	+19	5
3	Lithuania	3	1	2	199	196	+3	4
4	Romania	3	0	3	122	251	−129	3

Source: FIBA

16 August 2021

Boxscore

France	113–32	Romania

16 August 2021

Boxscore

Lithuania	65–73	Russia

17 August 2021

Boxscore

Romania	52–71	Lithuania

17 August 2021

Boxscore

Russia	52–70	France

18 August 2021

Boxscore

Russia	67–38	Romania

18 August 2021

Boxscore

France	71–63	Lithuania

==== Playoffs ====
Semifinals
A1	France	90
A4	Romania	30
A2	Russia	79
A3	Lithuania	84

Final
A1	France	57
A3	Lithuania	51
3rd place match
A4	Romania	47
A2	Russia	94

===== Semifinals =====
20 August 2021

Boxscore

France	90–30	Romania

20 August 2021

Boxscore

Russia	79–84	Lithuania

===== 3rd place match =====
21 August 2021

Boxscore

Romania	47–94	Russia

===== Final =====
21 August 2021

Boxscore

France	57–51	Lithuania

==== Final standings ====
Rank	Team
1	France
2	Lithuania
3	Russia
4	Romania

Qualified for the 2022 FIBA Under-17 Basketball World Cup

=== Group B ===
The Group B tournament was played in Sofia, Bulgaria. Spain withdrew from the tournament, but qualified for the 2022 FIBA Under-17 Basketball World Cup as hosts.

Pos	Team	Pld	W	L	PF	PA	PD	Pts	Qualification
1	Poland	4	4	0	321	282	+39	8	2022 FIBA Under-17 Basketball World Cup
2	Germany	4	3	1	294	256	+38	7	
3	Croatia	4	2	2	289	289	0	6	
4	Latvia	4	1	3	244	272	−28	5	
5	Bulgaria	4	0	4	269	318	−49	4	

Source: FIBA

16 August 2021

Boxscore

Latvia	45–59	Germany

16 August 2021

Boxscore

Poland	87–71	Croatia

17 August 2021

Boxscore

Croatia	69–58	Latvia

17 August 2021

Boxscore

Germany	88–65	Bulgaria

18 August 2021

Boxscore

Latvia	69–79	Poland

18 August 2021

Boxscore

Bulgaria	63–78	Croatia

20 August 2021

Boxscore

Croatia	71–81	Germany

20 August 2021

Boxscore

Poland	80–76	Bulgaria

21 August 2021

Boxscore

Germany	66–75	Poland

21 August 2021

Boxscore

Bulgaria	65–72	Latvia

=== Group C ===
The Group C tournament was played in Novi Sad, Serbia.

Pos	Team	Pld	W	L	PF	PA	PD	Pts	Qualification
1	Serbia	5	5	0	399	315	+84	10	2022 FIBA Under-17 Basketball World Cup
2	Slovenia	5	4	1	412	355	+57	9	2022 FIBA Under-17 Basketball World Cup
3	Turkey	5	2	3	370	364	+6	7	
4	Israel	5	2	3	387	352	+35	7	
5	Belgium	5	1	4	335	395	−60	6	
6	Czech Republic	5	1	4	293	415	−122	6	

Source: FIBA

16 August 2021

Boxscore

Israel	70–87	Slovenia

16 August 2021

Boxscore

Belgium	65–76	Turkey

16 August 2021

Boxscore

Czech Republic	52–83	Serbia

17 August 2021

Boxscore

Slovenia	82–78	Belgium

17 August 2021

Boxscore

Turkey	67–73	Czech Republic

17 August 2021

Boxscore

Serbia	80–74	Israel

18 August 2021

Boxscore

Slovenia	84–79	Turkey

18 August 2021

Boxscore

Israel	85–55	Czech Republic

18 August 2021

Boxscore

Belgium	48–76	Serbia

20 August 2021

Boxscore

Czech Republic	63–94	Belgium

20 August 2021

Boxscore

Turkey	80–60	Israel

20 August 2021

Boxscore

Serbia	78–73	Slovenia

21 August 2021

Boxscore

Belgium	50–98	Israel

21 August 2021

Boxscore

Slovenia	86–50	Czech Republic

21 August 2021

Boxscore

Serbia	82–68	Turkey

== 19–25 Challenger ==
The Groups D/E tournament was played in Sofia, Bulgaria.

=== Group phase ===
==== Group D ====
Pos	Team	Pld	W	L	PF	PA	PD	Pts	Qualification
1	Portugal	2	2	0	140	101	+39	4	19–25 Challenger Final Four
2	Ukraine	2	1	1	131	136	−5	3	19–25 Challenger Final Four
3	Switzerland	2	0	2	108	142	−34	2	19–25 Challenger Consolation round

Source: FIBA

16 August 2021

Boxscore

Ukraine	54–75	Portugal

17 August 2021

Boxscore

Portugal	65–47	Switzerland

18 August 2021

Boxscore

Switzerland	61–77	Ukraine

==== Group E ====
Pos	Team	Pld	W	L	PF	PA	PD	Pts	Qualification
1	Georgia	3	2	1	223	204	+19	5	19–25 Challenger Final Four
2	Hungary	3	2	1	200	163	+37	5	19–25 Challenger Final Four
3	Cyprus	3	1	2	180	210	−30	4	19–25 Challenger Consolation round
4	Slovakia	3	1	2	201	227	−26	4	19–25 Challenger Consolation round

Source: FIBA

16 August 2021

Boxscore

Hungary	63–39	Cyprus

16 August 2021

Boxscore

Georgia	76–77	Slovakia

17 August 2021

Boxscore

Cyprus	76–86	Georgia

17 August 2021

Boxscore

Slovakia	63–86	Hungary

18 August 2021

Boxscore

Cyprus	65–61	Slovakia

18 August 2021

Boxscore

Georgia	61–51	Hungary

=== Consolation round ===
==== Group Z ====
Pos	Team	Pld	W	L	PF	PA	PD	Pts
23	Slovakia	2	1	1	138	131	+7	3
24	Cyprus	2	1	1	125	122	+3	3
25	Switzerland	2	1	1	127	137	−10	3

Source: FIBA

20 August 2021

Boxscore

Switzerland	61–60	Cyprus

21 August 2021

Boxscore

Slovakia	77–66	Switzerland

=== Final Four ===
19th–22nd place semifinals
D1	Portugal	54
E2	Hungary	63
E1	Georgia	82
D2	Ukraine	62

19th place match
E2	Hungary	75
E1	Georgia	72
21st place match
D1	Portugal	62
D2	Ukraine	55

==== 19th–22nd place semifinals ====
20 August 2021

Boxscore

Portugal	54–63	Hungary

20 August 2021

Boxscore

Georgia	82–62	Ukraine

==== 21st place match ====
21 August 2021

Boxscore

Portugal	62–55	Ukraine

==== 19th place match ====
21 August 2021

Boxscore

Hungary	75–72	Georgia

=== Final standings ===
Rank	Team
19	Hungary
20	Georgia
21	Portugal
22	Ukraine
23	Slovakia
24	Cyprus
25	Switzerland

== 26–31 Challenger ==
=== Group F ===
The Group F tournament was played in Pristina, Kosovo.

Pos	Team	Pld	W	L	PF	PA	PD	Pts
26	Kosovo	5	5	0	526	170	+356	10
27	Luxembourg	5	4	1	356	281	+75	9
28	Moldova	5	2	3	283	343	−60	7
29	Malta	5	2	3	221	341	−120	7
30	Gibraltar	5	1	4	197	367	−170	6
31	Albania	5	1	4	269	350	−81	6

Source: FIBA

16 August 2021

Boxscore

Albania	52–56	Gibraltar

16 August 2021

Boxscore

Malta	20–117	Kosovo

16 August 2021

Boxscore

Moldova	65–77	Luxembourg

17 August 2021

Boxscore

Gibraltar	45–62	Malta

17 August 2021

Boxscore

Kosovo	122–42	Moldova

17 August 2021

Boxscore

Luxembourg	73–53	Albania

18 August 2021

Boxscore

Albania	67–56	Moldova

18 August 2021

Boxscore

Gibraltar	19–98	Kosovo

18 August 2021

Boxscore

Malta	36–75	Luxembourg

20 August 2021

Boxscore

Moldova	53–41	Malta

20 August 2021

Boxscore

Kosovo	103–46	Albania

20 August 2021

Boxscore

Luxembourg	88–41	Gibraltar

21 August 2021

Boxscore

Malta	62–51	Albania

21 August 2021

Boxscore

Gibraltar	36–67	Moldova

21 August 2021

Boxscore

Luxembourg	43–86	Kosovo

== See also ==
- 2021 FIBA U20 European Challengers
- 2021 FIBA U18 European Challengers
- 2021 FIBA U20 Women's European Challengers
- 2021 FIBA U18 Women's European Challengers
- 2021 FIBA U16 Women's European Challengers
