= 2022 FIBA U16 European Championship =

U16 European basketball championship

Tournament details
- Host country: North Macedonia
- City: Skopje
- Dates: 12–20 August 2022
- Teams: 16 (from 1 confederation)

Final positions
- Champions: Lithuania (2nd title)
- Runners-up: Spain
- Third place: France

Tournament statistics
- MVP: (Spain) Mario Saint-Supery
- Top scorer: (Israel) Ben Saraf (24.3 ppg)
- Top rebounds: (Montenegro) David Mirković (10.3 rpg)
- Top assists: (Croatia) Dominik Dolić (4.7 apg)

Official website
- www.fiba.basketball

The 2022 FIBA U16 European Championship was the 34th edition of the European basketball championship for national under-16 teams. It was played from 12 to 20 August 2022 in Skopje, North Macedonia. Lithuania men's national under-16 basketball team won the tournament and became the European champions for the second time.

== Venues ==
Skopje	Skopje	2022 FIBA U16 European Championship is located in North Macedonia
Boris Trajkovski Sports Center	SRC Kale	2022 FIBA U16 European Championship is located in North Macedonia
Capacity: 7,500	Capacity: 2,300	2022 FIBA U16 European Championship is located in North Macedonia

== Participating teams ==
- Croatia
- Denmark ▲ (Third place, 2019 FIBA U16 European Championship Division B)
- France
- Greece
- Israel
- Italy
- Latvia
- Lithuania
- Montenegro ▲ (Fourth place, 2019 FIBA U16 European Championship Division B)
- Netherlands ▲ (Runners-up, 2019 FIBA U16 European Championship Division B)
- North Macedonia
- Poland ▲ (Winners, 2019 FIBA U16 European Championship Division B)
- Serbia
- Slovenia
- Spain
- Turkey

== First round ==
The draw of the first round was held on 15 February 2022 in Freising, Germany.

In the first round, the teams were drawn into four groups of four. All teams advance to the playoffs.

=== Group A ===
Pos	Team	Pld	W	L	PF	PA	PD	Pts
1	Lithuania	3	3	0	251	183	+68	6
2	France	3	2	1	233	199	+34	5
3	Israel	3	1	2	230	245	−15	4
4	Netherlands	3	0	3	174	261	−87	3

Source: FIBA

12 August 2022

Boxscore

Israel	81–55	Netherlands

12 August 2022

Boxscore

Lithuania	73–41	France

13 August 2022

Boxscore

France	92–80	Israel

13 August 2022

Boxscore

Netherlands	73–80	Lithuania

14 August 2022

Boxscore

France	100–46	Netherlands

14 August 2022

Boxscore

Israel	69–98	Lithuania

=== Group B ===
Pos	Team	Pld	W	L	PF	PA	PD	Pts
1	Slovenia	3	2	1	224	192	+32	5
2	Serbia	3	2	1	240	223	+17	5
3	Croatia	3	2	1	236	219	+17	5
4	Denmark	3	0	3	157	223	−66	3

Source: FIBA

12 August 2022

Boxscore

Slovenia	60–42	Denmark

12 August 2022

Boxscore

Serbia	77–86	Croatia

13 August 2022

Boxscore

Croatia	64–83	Slovenia

13 August 2022

Boxscore

Denmark	56–77	Serbia

14 August 2022

Boxscore

Slovenia	81–86	Serbia

14 August 2022

Boxscore

Croatia	86–59	Denmark

=== Group C ===
Pos	Team	Pld	W	L	PF	PA	PD	Pts
1	Italy	3	3	0	220	188	+32	6
2	Turkey	3	2	1	182	187	−5	5
3	Poland	3	1	2	215	197	+18	4
4	Latvia	3	0	3	173	218	−45	3

Source: FIBA

12 August 2022

Boxscore

Latvia	54–87	Poland

12 August 2022

Boxscore

Italy	77–51	Turkey

13 August 2022

Boxscore

Turkey	60–51	Latvia

13 August 2022

Boxscore

Poland	69–72	Italy

14 August 2022

Boxscore

Turkey	71–59	Poland

14 August 2022

Boxscore

Latvia	68–71	Italy

=== Group D ===
Pos	Team	Pld	W	L	PF	PA	PD	Pts
1	Greece	3	3	0	232	140	+92	6
2	Spain	3	2	1	207	200	+7	5
3	North Macedonia	3	1	2	176	226	−50	4
4	Montenegro	3	0	3	173	222	−49	3

Source: FIBA

12 August 2022

Boxscore

Montenegro	62–69	North Macedonia

12 August 2022

Boxscore

Greece	75–47	Spain

13 August 2022

Boxscore

Spain	74–66	Montenegro

13 August 2022

Boxscore

North Macedonia	48–78	Greece

14 August 2022

Boxscore

Montenegro	45–79	Greece

14 August 2022

Boxscore

Spain	86–59	North Macedonia

== Playoff brackets ==
=== Main bracket ===
Round of 16
16 August
A1 Lithuania	97
B4 Denmark	48
16 August
C2 Turkey	82
D3 North Macedonia	74
16 August
B2 Serbia	86
A3 Israel	94
16 August
D1 Greece	84
C4 Latvia	62
16 August
A2 France	97
B3 Croatia	59
16 August
C1 Italy	78
D4 Montenegro	72
16 August
B1 Slovenia	78
A4 Netherlands	66
16 August
D2 Spain	96
C3 Poland	54

Quarterfinals
17 August
Lithuania	79
Turkey	68
17 August
Israel	67
Greece	75
17 August
France	84
Italy	77
17 August
Slovenia	68
Spain	87

Semifinals
19 August
Lithuania	77
Greece	61
19 August
France	64
Spain	78

Final
20 August
Lithuania	77
Spain	68
3rd place match
20 August
Greece	46
France	65

=== 5th place bracket ===
5th–8th place semifinals
19 August
Turkey	78
Israel	90
19 August
Italy	72
Slovenia	57

5th place match
20 August
Israel	89
Italy	75
7th place match
20 August
Turkey	46
Slovenia	67

=== 9th place bracket ===
9th–16th place quarterfinals
17 August
Denmark	64
North Macedonia	83
17 August
Serbia	76
Latvia	78
17 August
Croatia	65
Montenegro	72
17 August
Netherlands	65
Poland	80

9th–12th place semifinals
19 August
North Macedonia	77
Latvia	83
19 August
Montenegro	87
Poland	69

9th place match
20 August
Latvia	54
Montenegro	64
11th place match
20 August
North Macedonia	68
Poland	71

=== 13th place bracket ===
13th–16th place semifinals
19 August
Denmark	63
Serbia	87
19 August
Croatia	79
Netherlands	67

13th place match
20 August
Serbia	70
Croatia	63
15th place match
20 August
Denmark	55
Netherlands	70

== Playoff results ==
=== Round of 16 ===
16 August 2022
14:15

Boxscore

France	97–59	Croatia

SRC Kale, Skopje

16 August 2022
14:15

Boxscore

Spain	96–54	Poland

Boris Trajkovski Sports Center, Skopje

16 August 2022
16:30

Boxscore

Slovenia	78–66	Netherlands

Boris Trajkovski Sports Center, Skopje

16 August 2022
16:30

Boxscore

Italy	78–72	Montenegro

SRC Kale, Skopje

16 August 2022
18:45

Boxscore

Turkey	82–74	North Macedonia

SRC Kale, Skopje

16 August 2022
18:45

Boxscore

Greece	84–62	Latvia

Boris Trajkovski Sports Center, Skopje

16 August 2022
21:00

Boxscore

Lithuania	97–48	Denmark

SRC Kale, Skopje

16 August 2022
21:00

Boxscore

Serbia	86–94	Israel

Boris Trajkovski Sports Center, Skopje

=== 9th–16th place quarterfinals ===
17 August 2022
14:15

Boxscore

Croatia	65–72	Montenegro

SRC Kale, Skopje

17 August 2022
16:30

Boxscore

Netherlands	65–80	Poland

SRC Kale, Skopje

17 August 2022
18:45

Boxscore

Denmark	64–83	North Macedonia

SRC Kale, Skopje

17 August 2022
21:00

Boxscore

Serbia	76–78	Latvia

SRC Kale, Skopje

=== 13th–16th place semifinals ===
19 August 2022
14:15

Boxscore

Denmark	63–87	Serbia

SRC Kale, Skopje

19 August 2022
16:30

Boxscore

Croatia	79–67	Netherlands

SRC Kale, Skopje

=== 15th place match ===
20 August 2022
11:30

Boxscore

Denmark	55–70	Netherlands

SRC Kale, Skopje

=== 13th place match ===
20 August 2022
16:30

Boxscore

Serbia	70–63	Croatia

Boris Trajkovski Sports Center, Skopje

=== 9th–12th place semifinals ===
19 August 2022
18:45

Boxscore

North Macedonia	77–83	Latvia

SRC Kale, Skopje

19 August 2022
21:00

Boxscore

Montenegro	87–69	Poland

SRC Kale, Skopje

=== 11th place match ===
20 August 2022
13:45

Boxscore

North Macedonia	68–71	Poland

SRC Kale, Skopje

=== 9th place match ===
20 August 2022
16:00

Boxscore

Latvia	54–64	Montenegro

SRC Kale, Skopje

=== Championship quarterfinals ===
17 August 2022
14:15

Boxscore

France	84–77	Italy

Boris Trajkovski Sports Center, Skopje

17 August 2022
16:30

Boxscore

Slovenia	68–87	Spain

Boris Trajkovski Sports Center, Skopje

17 August 2022
18:45

Boxscore

Lithuania	79–68	Turkey

Boris Trajkovski Sports Center, Skopje

17 August 2022
21:00

Boxscore

Israel	67–75	Greece

Boris Trajkovski Sports Center, Skopje

=== 5th–8th place semifinals ===
19 August 2022
14:15

Boxscore

Turkey	78–90	Israel

Boris Trajkovski Sports Center, Skopje

19 August 2022
16:30

Boxscore

Italy	72–57	Slovenia

Boris Trajkovski Sports Center, Skopje

=== 7th place match ===
20 August 2022
18:15

Boxscore

Turkey	46–67	Slovenia

SRC Kale, Skopje

=== 5th place match ===
20 August 2022
14:15

Boxscore

Israel	89–75	Italy

Boris Trajkovski Sports Center, Skopje

=== Championship semifinals ===
19 August 2022
18:45

Boxscore

Lithuania	77–61	Greece

Boris Trajkovski Sports Center, Skopje

19 August 2022
21:00

Boxscore

France	64–78	Spain

Boris Trajkovski Sports Center, Skopje

=== 3rd place match ===
20 August 2022
18:45

Boxscore

Greece	46–65	France

Boris Trajkovski Sports Center, Skopje

=== Final ===
20 August 2022
21:00

Boxscore

Lithuania	77–68	Spain

Boris Trajkovski Sports Center, Skopje

== Final standings ==
Rank	Team	Record
1st place, gold medalist(s)	Lithuania	7–0
2nd place, silver medalist(s)	Spain	5–2
3rd place, bronze medalist(s)	France	5–2
4	Greece	5–2
5	Israel	4–3
6	Italy	5–2
7	Slovenia	4–3
8	Turkey	3–4
9	Montenegro	3–4
10	Latvia	2–5
11	Poland	3–4
12	North Macedonia	2–5
13	Serbia	4–3
14	Croatia	3–4
15	Netherlands	1–6
16	Denmark	0–7

Relegated to the 2023 FIBA U16 European Championship Division B

== Awards ==
Most Valuable Player
(Spain) Mario Saint-Supery

All-Tournament Team

- (Spain) Mario Saint-Supery
- (Lithuania) Nojus Indrušaitis
- (Israel) Ben Saraf
- (France) Mohamed Diakité
- (Greece) Neoklis Avdalas
