= 2018 FIBA U16 European Championship Division B =

Tournament details
- Host country: Bosnia and Herzegovina
- City: Sarajevo
- Dates: 9–18 August 2018
- Teams: 24 (from 1 confederation)
- Venue(s): 3 (in 1 host city)

Final positions
- Champions: Russia (2nd title)
- Runners-up: Bosnia and Herzegovina
- Third place: Macedonia
- Fourth place: Czech Republic

Official website
- www.fiba.basketball

The 2018 FIBA U16 European Championship Division B was the 15th edition of the Division B of the FIBA U16 European Championship. It was played in Sarajevo, Bosnia and Herzegovina, from 9 to 18 August 2018. 24 teams participated in the competition. Russia men's national under-16 basketball team won the tournament.

== Participating teams ==
- Belarus
- Belgium
- Bosnia and Herzegovina
- Bulgaria
- Cyprus
- Czech Republic
- Denmark
- Finland ▼ (15th place, 2017 FIBA U16 European Championship Division A)
- Great Britain
- Hungary
- Iceland
- Ireland
- Kosovo
- Luxembourg
- Macedonia
- Norway
- Poland
- Portugal
- Romania
- Russia ▼ (16th place, 2017 FIBA U16 European Championship Division A)
- Slovakia
- Sweden ▼ (14th place, 2017 FIBA U16 European Championship Division A)
- Switzerland
- Ukraine

== First round ==
=== Group A ===
Pos	Team	Pld	W	L	PF	PA	PD	Pts	Team advances to
1	Romania	5	4	1	366	310	+56	9	Quarterfinals
2	Great Britain	5	4	1	360	317	+43	9	Quarterfinals
3	Ireland	5	3	2	335	288	+47	8	9th–16th place playoffs
4	Portugal	5	2	3	338	264	+74	7	9th–16th place playoffs
5	Sweden	5	2	3	338	333	+5	7	17th–24th place playoffs
6	Luxembourg	5	0	5	218	443	−225	5	17th–24th place playoffs

Source: FIBA

=== Group B ===
Pos	Team	Pld	W	L	PF	PA	PD	Pts	Team advances to
1	Russia	5	5	0	470	297	+173	10	Quarterfinals
2	Macedonia	5	4	1	410	355	+55	9	Quarterfinals
3	Belgium	5	3	2	398	318	+80	8	9th–16th place playoffs
4	Denmark	5	2	3	404	394	+10	7	9th–16th place playoffs
5	Slovakia	5	1	4	312	428	−116	6	17th–24th place playoffs
6	Norway	5	0	5	246	448	−202	5	17th–24th place playoffs

Source: FIBA

=== Group C ===
Pos	Team	Pld	W	L	PF	PA	PD	Pts	Team advances to
1	Poland	5	5	0	406	320	+86	10	Quarterfinals
2	Iceland	5	4	1	393	389	+4	9	Quarterfinals
3	Bulgaria	5	3	2	337	307	+30	8	9th–16th place playoffs
4	Finland	5	2	3	339	324	+15	7	9th–16th place playoffs
5	Cyprus	5	1	4	286	351	−65	6	17th–24th place playoffs
6	Hungary	5	0	5	318	388	−70	5	17th–24th place playoffs

Source: FIBA

=== Group D ===
Pos	Team	Pld	W	L	PF	PA	PD	Pts	Team advances to
1	Bosnia and Herzegovina	5	5	0	455	342	+113	10	Quarterfinals
2	Czech Republic	5	4	1	432	373	+59	9	Quarterfinals
3	Ukraine	5	3	2	408	356	+52	8	9th–16th place playoffs
4	Belarus	5	2	3	360	362	−2	7	9th–16th place playoffs
5	Kosovo	5	1	4	313	457	−144	6	17th–24th place playoffs
6	Switzerland	5	0	5	323	401	−78	5	17th–24th place playoffs

Source: FIBA

== Playoffs ==
=== 17th–24th place playoffs ===
21st place match
B6	Norway	58
C5	Cyprus	59
23rd place match
D5	Kosovo	74
A6	Luxembourg	69

21st–24th place semifinals
B6	Norway	84
D5	Kosovo	72
A6	Luxembourg	54
C5	Cyprus	77

17th–24th place quarterfinals
A5	Sweden	77
B6	Norway	58
D5	Kosovo	58
C6	Hungary	96
B5	Slovakia	123
A6	Luxembourg	64
C5	Cyprus	38
D6	Switzerland	46

17th–20th place semifinals
A5	Sweden	83
C6	Hungary	92
B5	Slovakia	73
D6	Switzerland	90

17th place match
C6	Hungary	68
D6	Switzerland	56
19th place match
A5	Sweden	77
B5	Slovakia	57

=== 9th–16th place playoffs ===
13th place match
C4	Finland	78
A4	Portugal	70
15th place match
A3	Ireland	67
D4	Belarus	59

13th–16th place semifinals
A3	Ireland	63
C4	Finland	78
A4	Portugal	71
D4	Belarus	61

9th–16th place quarterfinals
A3	Ireland	63
B4	Denmark	64
D3	Ukraine	88
C4	Finland	67
B3	Belgium	81
A4	Portugal	73
C3	Bulgaria	69
D4	Belarus	61

9th–12th place semifinals
B4	Denmark	67
D3	Ukraine	76
B3	Belgium	85
C3	Bulgaria	67

9th place match
D3	Ukraine	59
B3	Belgium	91
11th place match
B4	Denmark	51
C3	Bulgaria	81

=== Championship playoffs ===
5th place match
C2	Iceland	78
C1	Poland	84
7th place match
A1	Romania	76
A2	Great Britain	80

5th–8th place semifinals
A1	Romania	59
C2	Iceland	73
A2	Great Britain	71
C1	Poland	83

Quarterfinals
A1	Romania	71
B2	Macedonia	74
D1	Bosnia and Herzegovina	86
C2	Iceland	59
B1	Russia	78
A2	Great Britain	70
C1	Poland	85
D2	Czech Republic	104

Semifinals
B2	Macedonia	76
D1	Bosnia and Herzegovina	95
B1	Russia	78
D2	Czech Republic	65

Final
D1	Bosnia and Herzegovina	77
B1	Russia	83
3rd place match
B2	Macedonia	84
D2	Czech Republic	66

== Final standings ==
Rank	Team
1st place, gold medalist(s)	Russia
2nd place, silver medalist(s)	Bosnia and Herzegovina
3rd place, bronze medalist(s)	Macedonia
4	Czech Republic
5	Poland
6	Iceland
7	Great Britain
8	Romania
9	Belgium
10	Ukraine
11	Bulgaria
12	Denmark
13	Finland
14	Portugal
15	Ireland
16	Belarus
17	Hungary
18	Switzerland
19	Sweden
20	Slovakia
21	Cyprus
22	Norway
23	Kosovo
24	Luxembourg

Promoted to the 2019 FIBA U16 European Championship Division A
Relegated to the 2019 FIBA U16 European Championship Division C
