= 2017 FIBA U16 European Championship =

31st FIBA Under-16 European Basketball Championship

Tournament details
- Host country: Montenegro
- Dates: 11–19 August 2017
- Teams: 16
- Venue: 2 (in 1 host city)

Final positions
- Champions: France (3rd title)

Tournament statistics
- MVP: (France) Killian Hayes
- Top scorer: (Italy) Mannion (19.9)
- Top rebounds: (Israel) Avdija (12.6)
- Top assists: (Israel) Avdija (5.3) (Serbia) Karapandžić (5.3)
- PPG (Team): Spain (83.9)
- RPG (Team): Lithuania (50.7)
- APG (Team): Spain (17.4)

Official website
- www.fiba.basketball

The 2017 FIBA U16 European Championship was the 31st edition of the Under-16 European Basketball Championship. The tournament was held in Podgorica, Montenegro, from 11 to 19 August 2017. Sixteen (16) teams participated, including 2016 Division B top three finishers.

== Hosts selection ==
On 21 November 2016, FIBA Europe announced during their Board Meeting held in Istanbul, Turkey that Montenegro will be the organising country for the tournament.

== Participating teams ==
- Croatia
- Estonia
- Finland
- France
- Germany
- Israel ▲ (Runners-up, 2016 FIBA U16 European Championship Division B)
- Italy
- Latvia
- Lithuania
- Montenegro
- Russia ▲ (Winners, 2016 FIBA U16 European Championship Division B)
- Serbia
- Slovenia ▲ (3rd place, 2016 FIBA U16 European Championship Division B)
- Spain
- Sweden
- Turkey

== First round ==
In this round, sixteen teams are allocated in four groups of four teams each. All teams advance to the Playoffs.

=== Group A ===
Pos	Team	Pld	W	L	PF	PA	PD	Pts
1	Lithuania	3	2	1	187	160	+27	5 (Note: Lithuania 1–1, +6PD; Israel 1–1, 0PD; Serbia 1–1, −6PD)
2	Israel	3	2	1	208	205	+3	5
3	Serbia	3	2	1	229	185	+44	5
4	Croatia	3	0	3	158	232	−74	3

Source: FIBA
Notes:

11 August
16:00

Boxscore

Lithuania	54–56	Serbia
Scoring by quarter: 19–8, 12–16, 11–17, 12–15
Pts: M. Blazevic 13; Rebs: M. Blazevic 9 Asts: N. Pankratjevas 4		Pts: M. Pavicevic 11; Rebs: D. Pazin 8 Asts: D. Pazin 2

Morača Sports Center, Podgorica
Attendance: 150
Referees:
(Spain) Miguel Ángel Pérez Niz
(Wales) Haydn Jones
(Sweden) Apostolos Kalpakas

11 August
18:15

Boxscore

Israel	67–64	Croatia
Scoring by quarter: 25–14, 16–18, 13–20, 13–12

Morača Sports Center, Podgorica

12 August
13:45

Boxscore

Serbia	71–79	Israel
Scoring by quarter: 16–13, 13–24, 23–18, 19–24

Sports & Culture Center of the University of Montenegro, Podgorica

12 August
16:00

Boxscore

Croatia	42–63	Lithuania
Scoring by quarter: 10–12, 14–25, 11–15, 7–11

Sports & Culture Center of the University of Montenegro, Podgorica

13 August
13:45

Boxscore

Lithuania	70–62	Israel
Scoring by quarter: 18–17, 13–18, 17–17, 22–10

Sports & Culture Center of the University of Montenegro, Podgorica

13 August
16:00

Boxscore

Croatia	52–102	Serbia
Scoring by quarter: 17–32, 10–23, 12–27, 13–20

Sports & Culture Center of the University of Montenegro, Podgorica

=== Group B ===
Pos	Team	Pld	W	L	PF	PA	PD	Pts
1	Slovenia	3	3	0	197	166	+31	6
2	Germany	3	2	1	209	177	+32	5
3	Turkey	3	1	2	206	224	−18	4
4	Finland	3	0	3	170	215	−45	3

Source: FIBA

11 August
18:15

Boxscore

Turkey	65–87	Germany
Scoring by quarter: 20–24, 15–21, 14–14, 16–28

Sports & Culture Center of the University of Montenegro, Podgorica

11 August
20:30

Boxscore

Slovenia	65–53	Finland
Scoring by quarter: 20–18, 13–16, 21–8, 11–11

Sports & Culture Center of the University of Montenegro, Podgorica

12 August
16:00

Boxscore

Germany	56–68	Slovenia
Scoring by quarter: 14–21, 12–20, 8–12, 22–15

Morača Sports Center, Podgorica

12 August
18:15

Boxscore

Finland	73–84	Turkey
Scoring by quarter: 16–27, 16–23, 12–16, 29–18

Morača Sports Center, Podgorica

13 August
13:45

Boxscore

Finland	44–66	Germany
Scoring by quarter: 6–21, 19–16, 13–18, 6–11

Morača Sports Center, Podgorica

13 August
20:30

Boxscore

Turkey	57–64	Slovenia
Scoring by quarter: 14–20, 15–7, 5–16, 23–21

Sports & Culture Center of the University of Montenegro, Podgorica

=== Group C ===
Pos	Team	Pld	W	L	PF	PA	PD	Pts
1	France	3	3	0	205	179	+26	6
2	Italy	3	2	1	215	185	+30	5
3	Russia	3	1	2	192	220	−28	4
4	Estonia	3	0	3	194	222	−28	3

Source: FIBA

11 August
13:45

Boxscore

Estonia	71–74	Russia
Scoring by quarter: 18–17, 11–25, 25–22, 17–10

Sports & Culture Center of the University of Montenegro, Podgorica

11 August
16:00

Boxscore

France	64–59	Italy
Scoring by quarter: 21–9, 10–19, 19–15, 14–16

Sports & Culture Center of the University of Montenegro, Podgorica

12 August
13:45

Boxscore

Russia	61–63	France
Scoring by quarter: 18–12, 11–20, 19–13, 13–18

Morača Sports Center, Podgorica

12 August
20:30

Boxscore

Italy	70–64	Estonia
Scoring by quarter: 11–18, 20–16, 20–13, 19–17

Sports & Culture Center of the University of Montenegro, Podgorica

13 August
16:00

Boxscore

France	78–59	Estonia
Scoring by quarter: 17–9, 17–17, 25–19, 19–14

Morača Sports Center, Podgorica

13 August
18:15

Boxscore

Russia	57–86	Italy
Scoring by quarter: 17–23, 8–22, 13–23, 19–18

Morača Sports Center, Podgorica

=== Group D ===
Pos	Team	Pld	W	L	PF	PA	PD	Pts
1	Spain	3	2	1	280	211	+69	5 (Note: Spain 1–1, +20PD; Latvia 1–1, −7PD; Montenegro 1–1, −13PD)
2	Latvia	3	2	1	208	205	+3	5
3	Montenegro (H)	3	2	1	220	201	+19	5
4	Sweden	3	0	3	157	248	−91	3

Source: FIBA
(H) Hosts
Notes:

11 August
13:45

Boxscore

Spain	91–70	Latvia
Scoring by quarter: 21–15, 18–12, 30–18, 22–25

Morača Sports Center, Podgorica

11 August
20:30

Boxscore

Sweden	45–77	Montenegro
Scoring by quarter: 8–22, 12–17, 16–15, 9–23

Morača Sports Center, Podgorica

12 August
18:15

Boxscore

Latvia	58–48	Sweden
Scoring by quarter: 18–12, 13–7, 11–15, 16–14

Sports & Culture Center of the University of Montenegro, Podgorica

12 August
20:30

Boxscore

Montenegro	77–76	Spain
Scoring by quarter: 14–20, 14–24, 32–9, 17–23

Morača Sports Center, Podgorica

13 August
16:00

Boxscore

Spain	113–64	Sweden
Scoring by quarter: 28–11, 32–22, 27–14, 26–17

Sports & Culture Center of the University of Montenegro, Podgorica

13 August
20:30

Boxscore

Montenegro	66–80	Latvia
Scoring by quarter: 18–14, 17–18, 15–16, 16–32

Morača Sports Center, Podgorica

== Final round ==
=== Bracket ===
Round of 16
15 August
Lithuania	70
Finland	58
15 August
Italy	47
Montenegro	68
15 August
Germany	55
Serbia	59
15 August
Spain	59
Estonia	54
15 August
Israel	66
Turkey	89
15 August
France	73
Sweden	68
15 August
Slovenia	65
Croatia	76
15 August
Latvia (OT)	83
Russia	81

Quarter-finals
16 August
Lithuania	74
Montenegro	80
16 August
Serbia	82
Spain	73
16 August
Turkey	76
France	80
16 August
Croatia	71
Latvia	69

Semi-finals
18 August
Montenegro	73
Serbia	66
18 August
France	83
Croatia	60

Final
19 August
Montenegro	68
France	75
Third place
19 August
Serbia	76
Croatia	71

5th–8th place bracket

5th–8th place semifinals
18 August
Lithuania	92
Spain	80
18 August
Turkey	79
Latvia	73

Fifth place
19 August
Lithuania	62
Turkey	80
Seventh place
19 August
Spain	95
Latvia	77

9th–16th place bracket

9th–16th place quarterfinals
16 August
Finland	49
Italy	65
16 August
Germany	61
Estonia	68
16 August
Israel	74
Sweden	66
16 August
Slovenia	78
Russia	54

9th–12th place semifinals
18 August
Italy	65
Estonia	53
18 August
Israel	59
Slovenia	70

Ninth place
19 August
Italy	73
Slovenia	47
Eleventh place
19 August
Estonia	78
Israel	85

13th–16th place bracket

13th–16th place semifinals
18 August
Finland	62
Germany	75
18 August
Sweden (OT)	79
Russia	76

13th place
19 August
Germany	77
Sweden	44
15th place
19 August
Finland	69
Russia	65

=== Round of 16 ===
15 August
13:45

Boxscore

Germany	55–59	Serbia
Scoring by quarter: 15–17, 14–16, 12–14, 14–12

Sports & Culture Center of the University of Montenegro, Podgorica

15 August
13:45

Boxscore

Latvia	83–81 (OT)	Russia
Scoring by quarter: 15–14, 18–25, 15–18, 22–14, Overtime: 13–10

Morača Sports Center, Podgorica

15 August
16:00

Boxscore

Slovenia	65–76	Croatia
Scoring by quarter: 15–21, 21–15, 11–20, 18–20

Morača Sports Center, Podgorica

15 August
16:00

Boxscore

Spain	59–54	Estonia
Scoring by quarter: 18–6, 11–11, 12–23, 18–14

Sports & Culture Center of the University of Montenegro, Podgorica

15 August
18:15

Boxscore

Lithuania	70–58	Finland
Scoring by quarter: 19–11, 15–13, 15–20, 21–14

Morača Sports Center, Podgorica

15 August
18:15

Boxscore

Israel	66–89	Turkey
Scoring by quarter: 16–27, 13–19, 19–23, 18–20

Sports & Culture Center of the University of Montenegro, Podgorica

15 August
20:30

Boxscore

France	73–68	Sweden
Scoring by quarter: 16–20, 13–12, 23–21, 21–15

Sports & Culture Center of the University of Montenegro, Podgorica

15 August
20:30

Boxscore

Italy	47–68	Montenegro
Scoring by quarter: 19–18, 12–16, 6–10, 10–24

Morača Sports Center, Podgorica

=== 9th–16th place quarterfinals ===
16 August
13:45

Boxscore

Slovenia	78–54	Russia
Scoring by quarter: 13–13, 23–15, 20–12, 22–14

Sports & Culture Center of the University of Montenegro, Podgorica

16 August
16:00

Boxscore

Germany	61–68	Estonia
Scoring by quarter: 16–10, 12–10, 18–13, 15–35

Sports & Culture Center of the University of Montenegro, Podgorica

16 August
18:15

Boxscore

Israel	74–66	Sweden
Scoring by quarter: 13–11, 17–13, 16–23, 28–19

Sports & Culture Center of the University of Montenegro, Podgorica

16 August
20:30

Boxscore

Finland	49–65	Italy
Scoring by quarter: 8–18, 11–17, 12–21, 18–9

Sports & Culture Center of the University of Montenegro, Podgorica

=== Quarterfinals ===
16 August
13:45

Boxscore

Croatia	71–69	Latvia
Scoring by quarter: 16–25, 18–12, 20–15, 17–17

Morača Sports Center, Podgorica

16 August
16:00

Boxscore

Serbia	82–73	Spain
Scoring by quarter: 20–11, 19–22, 26–15, 17–25

Morača Sports Center, Podgorica

16 August
18:15

Boxscore

Turkey	76–80	France
Scoring by quarter: 15–24, 18–22, 22–18, 21–16

Morača Sports Center, Podgorica

16 August
20:30

Boxscore

Lithuania	74–80	Montenegro
Scoring by quarter: 20–19, 13–16, 17–25, 24–20

Morača Sports Center, Podgorica

=== 13th–16th place semifinals ===
18 August 2017
13:45

Boxscore

Finland	62–75	Germany
Scoring by quarter: 12–24, 15–17, 18–24, 17–10

Sports & Culture Center of the University of Montenegro, Podgorica

18 August 2017
16:00

Boxscore

Sweden	79–76 (OT)	Russia
Scoring by quarter: 21–27, 19–20, 17–14, 13–9, Overtime: 9–6

Sports & Culture Center of the University of Montenegro, Podgorica

=== 9th–12th place semifinals ===
18 August 2017
18:15

Boxscore

Italy	65–53	Estonia
Scoring by quarter: 18–10, 17–15, 16–13, 14–15

Sports & Culture Center of the University of Montenegro, Podgorica

18 August 2017
20:30

Boxscore

Israel	59–70	Slovenia
Scoring by quarter: 9–15, 18–24, 11–19, 21–12

Sports & Culture Center of the University of Montenegro, Podgorica

=== 5th–8th place semifinals ===
18 August 2017
13:45

Boxscore

Lithuania	92–80	Spain
Scoring by quarter: 15–18, 23–11, 31–13, 23–38

Morača Sports Center, Podgorica

18 August 2017
16:00

Boxscore

Turkey	79–73	Latvia
Scoring by quarter: 6–17, 26–26, 25–12, 22–18

Morača Sports Center, Podgorica

=== Semifinals ===
18 August 2017
18:15

Boxscore

France	83–60	Croatia
Scoring by quarter: 13–15, 25–9, 23–17, 22–19
Pts: Hayes 20; Rebs: Hayes 8 Asts: Hayes 5		Pts: Rudan 25; Rebs: Rudan 8 Asts: Gizdavić, Rašić 3

Morača Sports Center, Podgorica
Referees: Gentian Cici (ALB), Andrei Sharapa (BLR), Yener Yilmaz (Tur)

18 August 2017
20:30

Boxscore

Montenegro	73–66	Serbia
Scoring by quarter: 20–21, 18–10, 22–15, 13–20
Pts: Vlahović 21; Rebs: Tomašević 15; Asts: Kljajić, Vujisić 4		Pts: Pažin 18; Rebs: Popović 8 Asts: Karapandžić 8

Morača Sports Center, Podgorica
Referees: Miguel Ángel Pérez Niz (ESP), Sergiy Zashchuk (UKR), Apostolos Kalpakas (SWE)

=== 15th place game ===
19 August 2017
11:30

Boxscore

Finland	69–65	Russia
Scoring by quarter: 15–13, 18–14, 12–16, 24–22

Sports & Culture Center of the University of Montenegro, Podgorica

=== 13th place game ===
19 August 2017
13:45

Boxscore

Germany	77–44	Sweden
Scoring by quarter: 20–6, 21–16, 17–15, 19–7

Sports & Culture Center of the University of Montenegro, Podgorica

=== Eleventh place game ===
19 August 2017
16:00

Boxscore

Estonia	78–85	Israel
Scoring by quarter: 19–26, 33–23, 15–12, 11–24

Sports & Culture Center of the University of Montenegro, Podgorica

=== Ninth place game ===
19 August 2017
18:15

Boxscore

Italy	73–47	Slovenia
Scoring by quarter: 14–12, 21–12, 23–8, 23–15

Sports & Culture Center of the University of Montenegro, Podgorica

=== Seventh place game ===
19 August 2017
13:45

Boxscore

Spain	95–77	Latvia
Scoring by quarter: 25–14, 20–16, 23–24, 27–23

Morača Sports Center, Podgorica

=== Fifth place game ===
19 August 2017
16:00

Boxscore

Lithuania	62–80	Turkey
Scoring by quarter: 13–20, 23–24, 7–20, 19–16

Morača Sports Center, Podgorica

=== Bronze medal game ===
19 August 2017
18:15

Boxscore

Serbia	76–71	Croatia
Scoring by quarter: 21–11, 20–22, 13–24, 22–14

Morača Sports Center, Podgorica

=== Final ===
19 August 2017
20:30

Boxscore

Montenegro	68–75	France
Scoring by quarter: 14–28, 20–17, 18–11, 16–19
Pts: Kljajić, Tomašević 20; Rebs: Kljajić, Vujisić 7 Asts: Kljajić 6		Pts: Hayes 21; Rebs: Hayes, Maledon 8 Asts: Maledon 4

Morača Sports Center, Podgorica
Attendance: 4500
Referees: Miguel Ángel Pérez Niz (ESP), Gentian Cici (ALB), Yener Yılmaz (TUR)

== Final standings ==
Rank	Team	Record
1st place, gold medalist(s)	France	7–0
2nd place, silver medalist(s)	Montenegro	5–2
3rd place, bronze medalist(s)	Serbia	5–2
4	Croatia	2–5
5	Turkey	4–3
6	Lithuania	4–3
7	Spain	4–3
8	Latvia	3–4
9	Italy	5–2
10	Slovenia	5–2
11	Israel	4–3
12	Estonia	1–6
13	Germany	4–3
14	Sweden	1–6
15	Finland	1–6
16	Russia	1–6

Qualified for the 2018 FIBA Under-17 Basketball World Cup
Relegated to the 2018 FIBA U16 European Championship Division B

== Awards ==
Most Valuable Player
(France) Killian Hayes

All-Tournament Team

- (France) Killian Hayes
- (Montenegro) Bojan Tomašević
- (Montenegro) Stefan Vlahović
- (Croatia) Matej Rudan
- (Serbia) Đorđe Pažin
