= Finland men's national under-16 and under-17 basketball team =

Youth basketball team representing Finland

Finland
- FIBA zone: FIBA Europe
- National federation: Basketball Finland

U17 World Cup
- Appearances: 1
- Medals: None

U16 EuroBasket
- Appearances: 11
- Medals: None

U16 EuroBasket Division B
- Appearances: 14
- Medals: Silver: 1 (2022); Bronze: 1 (2013)

The Finland men's national under-16 and under-17 basketball team is a national basketball team of Finland, administered by Basketball Finland. It represents the country in international under-16 and under-17 men's basketball competitions.

== FIBA U16 EuroBasket participations ==
Year	Position
1971–1979	Did not enter
(Greece) 1981	4th
(West Germany) 1983	12th
(Bulgaria) 1985	12th
1987–1993	Did not enter
(Portugal) 1995	10th
1997–2003	Did not enter
(Bulgaria) / (England) 2004 Division B	13th/14th
(Bulgaria) 2005 Division B	11th
(Estonia) 2006 Division B	6th
(North Macedonia) 2007 Division B	11th
(Bosnia and Herzegovina) 2008 Division B	8th
(Portugal) 2009 Division B	8th
(Estonia) 2010 Division B	9th

Year	Position
(North Macedonia) 2011 Division B	11th
(Romania) 2012 Division B	11th
(Bosnia and Herzegovina) 2013 Division B	3rd place, bronze medalist(s)
(Latvia) 2014	13th
(Lithuania) 2015	6th
(Poland) 2016	5th
(Montenegro) 2017	15th
(Bosnia and Herzegovina) 2018 Division B	13th
(Montenegro) 2019 Division B	13th
(Bulgaria) 2022 Division B	2nd place, silver medalist(s)
(North Macedonia) 2023	12th
(Greece) 2024	11th
(Georgia (country)) 2025	15th
(North Macedonia) 2026 Division B	9th

== FIBA Under-17 Basketball World Cup participations ==
Year	Result
(Spain) 2016	12th

== Former players ==
- Joonas Iisalo
- Mikael Jantunen

== See also ==
- Finland men's national basketball team
- Finland men's national under-18 basketball team
- Finland women's national under-16 basketball team
