= Sweden men's national under-16 basketball team =

Youth basketball team representing Sweden

Sweden
- FIBA zone: FIBA Europe
- National federation: Swedish Basketball Federation
- Nickname(s): Blågult (The Blue and Yellow)

U17 World Cup
- Appearances: None

U16 EuroBasket
- Appearances: 9
- Medals: None

U16 EuroBasket Division B
- Appearances: 18
- Medals: Bronze: 3 (2007, 2012, 2015)
Home	Away

The Sweden men's national under-16 basketball team (Swedish: svenska pojklandslaget i basket) is a national basketball team of Sweden, administered by the Svenska Basketbollförbundet. It represents the country in international under-16 men's basketball competitions.

At the 2007 U16 European Championship Division B, Sweden captured their first ever medal as they won the third place game to win the bronze, and completing the feat twice more in 2012 and 2015.

== FIBA U16 EuroBasket participations ==
Year	Division A	Division B
1971	10th	
1973	12th	
1975	12th	
1981	12th	
1983	10th	
1985	11th	
2004		17th/18th
2005		9th
2006		9th
2007		3rd place, bronze medalist(s)
2008		4th
2009		5th
2010		14th
2011		14th

Year	Division A	Division B
2012		3rd place, bronze medalist(s)
2013	16th	
2014		13th
2015		3rd place, bronze medalist(s)
2016	12th	
2017	14th	
2018		19th
2019		12th
2022		7th
2023		12th
2024		8th
2025		11th
2026		8th

== See also ==
- Sweden men's national basketball team
- Sweden men's national under-18 basketball team
- Sweden women's national under-16 basketball team
