= 2017 FIBA U16 European Championship Division B =

Tournament details
- Host country: Bulgaria
- City: Sofia
- Dates: 10–19 August
- Teams: 24
- Venue: 3 (in 1 host city)

Final positions
- Champions: Greece (1st title)
- Runners-up: Netherlands
- Third place: Georgia
- Fourth place: Great Britain

Tournament statistics
- MVP: (Greece) Nikos Rogkavopoulos
- Top scorer: (Kosovo) Erhan Sholla (21.5 ppg)

Official website
- www.fiba.basketball

The 2017 FIBA U16 European Championship Division B was played in Sofia, Bulgaria, from 10 to 19 August 2017. 24 teams participated in the competition. Greece won the competition without losing a single game and won the promotion to Division A. Netherlands and Georgia also gained promotion.

== Participating teams ==
- Belarus
- Belgium
- Bosnia and Herzegovina ▼ (14th place, 2016 FIBA U16 European Championship Division A)
- Bulgaria
- Cyprus ▲ (Winners, 2016 FIBA U16 European Championship Division C)
- Czech Republic
- Denmark
- Georgia
- Great Britain
- Greece ▼ (16th place, 2016 FIBA U16 European Championship Division A)
- Hungary
- Iceland
- Ireland
- Kosovo
- Luxembourg
- Macedonia
- Netherlands
- Norway
- Poland ▼ (15th place, 2016 FIBA U16 European Championship Division A)
- Portugal
- Romania
- Slovakia
- Switzerland
- Ukraine

== First round ==
In this round, twenty-four teams are allocated in four groups of six teams each. First two teams advance to the Final round and other teams advance to Classification for 9th–24th place.

=== Group A ===
Pos	Team	Pld	W	L	PF	PA	PD	Pts	Team advances to
1	Greece	5	5	0	485	295	+190	10	Quarterfinals
2	Belgium	5	4	1	422	300	+122	9	Quarterfinals
3	Belarus	5	3	2	357	379	−22	8	9th–16th place classification
4	Iceland	5	2	3	363	357	+6	7	9th–16th place classification
5	Switzerland	5	1	4	295	437	−142	6	17th–24th place classification
6	Romania	5	0	5	270	424	−154	5	17th–24th place classification

Source: FIBA

10 August 2017	Switzerland	60–80	Iceland	Universiada Hall, Sofia
13:45	Scoring by quarter: 20–21, 14–29, 16–22, 10–8
	Pts: M. Mouron Barba 16; Rebs: N. Hullinger 11; Asts: M. Mouron Barba 4	Boxscore	Pts: D. Jonsson 17; Rebs: J. Agustsson 7 Asts: D. Jonsson 5	Referees: Haris Bijedić (BIH), Michel Gold (LUX), Graham Shaw (SCO)

10 August 2017	Romania	48–85	Belgium	Universiada Hall, Sofia
16:00	Scoring by quarter: 10–22, 17–22, 6–15, 15–26
	Pts: C. Gavriloaia 15; Rebs: M. Duica 8 Asts: L. Vasile 2	Boxscore	Pts: H. Bratanovic 23; Rebs: H. Bratanovic 15; Asts: N. De Ridder 5	Referees: Janusz Calik (POL), Petar Denkovski (MKD), Martin Horozov (BUL)

10 August 2017	Greece	101–60	Belarus	Universiada Hall, Sofia
20:30	Scoring by quarter: 38–9, 19–13, 25–18, 19–20
	Pts: D. Klonaras 22; Rebs: A. Sotiriou 9 Asts: G. Tazopoulos 5	Boxscore	Pts: N. Lagun 9 Rebs: A. Tsynkevich 6 Asts: N. Matsal 2	Referees: Ivor Matejek (CZE), Martynas Gudas (LTU), Graham Shaw (SCO)

11 August 2017	Iceland	67–45	Romania	Triaditza Hall, Sofia
16:00	Scoring by quarter: 14–11, 22–13, 24–4, 7–17
	Pts: D. Jonsson 20; Rebs: V. Hlynsson 13; Asts: J. Agustsson 5	Boxscore	Pts: T. Lungu 13; Rebs: R. Radulescu 6 Asts: T. Lungu 3	Referees: Georgios Poursanidis (GRE), Petar Denkovski (MKD), Armando Ramos Partida (MEX)

11 August 2017	Belarus	74–68	Switzerland	Triaditza Hall, Sofia
16:00	Scoring by quarter: 20–10, 9–10, 17–18, 28–30
	Pts: R. Hests 19; Rebs: K. Tsetserukou 16; Asts: N. Matsal 3	Boxscore	Pts: K. Martina 20; Rebs: N. Hullinger 7 Asts: K. Martina 4	Referees: Marek Kukelcik (SVK), Michel Glod (LUX), Martin Horozov (BUL)

11 August 2017	Belgium	60–77	Greece	Triaditza Hall, Sofia
18:15	Scoring by quarter: 8–26, 19–14, 22–19, 11–18
	Pts: A. Verstraete 14; Rebs: H. Bratanovic 9 Asts: I. Anwoir 3	Boxscore	Pts: N. Rogkavopoulos 16; Rebs: N. Rogkavopoulos 11; Asts: K. Vlasios 4	Referees: Zdravko Rutešić (MNE), Ivor Matejek (CZE), Milen Tsvetkov (BUL)

12 August 2017	Greece	111–60	Romania	Arena Armeec II, Sofia
13:45	Scoring by quarter: 28–15, 34–12, 32–17, 17–16
	Pts: A. Tsoumanis 20; Rebs: A. Tsoumanis 12; Asts: R. Lanaras 5	Boxscore	Pts: C. Gavriloaia 14; Rebs: M. Duica 7 Asts: T. Valeanu 2	Referees: Marek Kukelcik (SVK), Martynas Gudas (LTU), Milen Tsvetkov (BUL)

12 August 2017	Switzerland	52–98	Belgium	Arena Armeec II, Sofia
16:00	Scoring by quarter: 9–24, 13–22, 16–21, 14–31
	Pts: M. Mouron Barba 13; Rebs: N. Hullinger 4 Asts: N. Lugt 4	Boxscore	Pts: N. De Ridde 35; Rebs: N. De Ridde 12; Asts: N. De Ridde 5	Referees: Zdenko Tomasovic (SVK), Petar Denkovski (MKD), Michel Glod (LUX)

12 August 2017	Belarus	78–77	Iceland	Triaditza Hall, Sofia
20:30	Scoring by quarter: 17–27, 17–24, 19–12, 25–14
	Pts: N. Matsal 16; Rebs: D. Barysevich 9 Asts: D. Barysevich 4	Boxscore	Pts: V. Hlynsson 26; Rebs: A. Kristjansson 6 Asts: D. Jonsson 7	Referees: Marek Kukelcik (SVK), Vladyslav Isachenko (UKR), Jayson Anthony Stiell (CAN)

14 August 2017	Iceland	76–85	Greece	Arena Armeec II, Sofia
16:00	Scoring by quarter: 21–15, 22–22, 13–22, 20–26
	Pts: V. Hlynsson 20; Rebs: J. Agustsson 6 Asts: V. Hlynsson 5	Boxscore	Pts: N. Rogkavopoulos 17; Rebs: A. Tsoumanis 16; Asts: D. Klonaras 7	Referees: Zdenko Tomasevic (SVK), Marc Mouton (LUX), Jayson Anthony Stiell (CAN)

14 August 2017	Belgium	90–60	Belarus	Arena Armeec II, Sofia
18:15	Scoring by quarter: 22–16, 20–13, 24–12, 24–19
	Pts: H. Bratanovic 17; Rebs: N. De Ridder 14; Asts: I. Anwoir 8	Boxscore	Pts: A. Navoichyk 14; Rebs: K. Tsetserukou 8 Asts: R. Hests 5	Referees: Marek Kukelcik (SVK), Martin Horozov (BUL), Armando Ramos Partida (MEX)

14 August 2017	Romania	74–76(OT)	Switzerland	Arena Armeec II, Sofia
20:30	Scoring by quarter: 6–19, 23–18, 19–7, 17–21, Overtime: 9–11
	Pts: C. Gavriloaia 24; Rebs: M. Duica 11; Asts: C. Gavriloaia 7	Boxscore	Pts: N. Hullinger 31; Rebs: N. Hullinger 12; Asts: K. Martina 3	Referees: Ivor Matejek (CZE), Irakli Berishvili (GEO), Igor Demenkov (RUS)

15 August 2017	Belgium	89–63	Iceland	Universiada Hall, Sofia
13:45	Scoring by quarter: 24–13, 20–20, 21–14, 24–16
	Pts: N. De Ridder 25; Rebs: N. De Ridder 17; Asts: N. De Ridder 5	Boxscore	Pts: D. Jonsson 16; Rebs: V. Hlynsson 5 Asts: J. Agustsson 3	Referees: Haris Bijedić (BIH), Vladyslav Isachenko (UKR), Rune Ressel Larsen (DEN)

15 August 2017	Switzerland	39–111	Greece	Universiada Hall, Sofia
16:00	Scoring by quarter: 16–33, 10–24, 8–32, 5–22
	Pts: N. Lugt 12; Rebs: H. Jusovic 5 Asts: L. Langura 2	Boxscore	Pts: D. Karaiskos 19; Rebs: D. Karaiskos 8 Asts: N. Rogkavopoulos 6	Referees: Marek Kukelcik (SVK), Irakli Berishvili (GEO), Graham Shaw (SCO)

15 August 2017	Belarus	85–43	Romania	Universiada Hall, Sofia
20:30	Scoring by quarter: 23–14, 26–8, 15–16, 21–5
	Pts: A. Navoichyk 22; Rebs: A. Tsynkevich 10; Asts: N. Matsal 7	Boxscore	Pts: C. Gavriloaia 16; Rebs: M. Duica 7 Asts: L. Vasile 2	Referees: Zdravko Rutešić (MNE), Petar Denkovski (MKD), Marc Mouton (LUX)

=== Group B ===
Pos	Team	Pld	W	L	PF	PA	PD	Pts	Team advances to
1	Netherlands	5	5	0	391	231	+160	10	Quarterfinals
2	Ukraine	5	3	2	346	280	+66	8	Quarterfinals
3	Poland	5	3	2	353	300	+53	8	9th–16th place classification
4	Bulgaria	5	3	2	336	335	+1	8	9th–16th place classification
5	Denmark	5	1	4	292	422	−130	6	17th–24th place classification
6	Cyprus	5	0	5	262	412	−150	5	17th–24th place classification

Source: FIBA

=== Group C ===
Pos	Team	Pld	W	L	PF	PA	PD	Pts	Team advances to
1	Czech Republic	5	5	0	343	274	+69	10	Quarterfinals
2	Hungary	5	4	1	323	284	+39	9	Quarterfinals
3	Bosnia and Herzegovina	5	3	2	390	350	+40	8	9th–16th place classification
4	Ireland	5	2	3	336	326	+10	7	9th–16th place classification
5	Slovakia	5	1	4	295	303	−8	6	17th–24th place classification
6	Norway	5	0	5	254	404	−150	5	17th–24th place classification

Source: FIBA

=== Group D ===
Pos	Team	Pld	W	L	PF	PA	PD	Pts	Team advances to
1	Great Britain	5	5	0	377	242	+135	10	Quarterfinals
2	Georgia	5	4	1	380	283	+97	9	Quarterfinals
3	Portugal	5	3	2	318	309	+9	8	9th–16th place classification
4	Macedonia	5	2	3	290	369	−79	7	9th–16th place classification
5	Kosovo	5	1	4	269	314	−45	6	17th–24th place classification
6	Luxembourg	5	0	5	258	375	−117	5	17th–24th place classification

Source: FIBA

== Final round ==
=== Bracket ===
Quarterfinals
17 August
Greece	78
Ukraine	63
17 August
Great Britain	85
Hungary	54
17 August
Netherlands	65
Belgium	51
17 August
Czech Republic	51
Georgia	65

Semifinals
18 August
Greece	75
Great Britain	72
18 August
Netherlands	67
Georgia	62

Final
19 August
Greece	74
Netherlands	60
Third place
19 August
Great Britain	63
Georgia	64

5th–8th place bracket

5th–8th place semifinals
18 August
Ukraine	73
Hungary	59
18 August
Belgium	88
Czech Republic	70

5th place game
19 August
Ukraine	76
Belgium	71
7th place game
19 August
Hungary	63
Czech Republic	60

=== Quarterfinals ===
17 August 2017
13:45

Boxscore

Greece	78–63	Ukraine
Scoring by quarter: 19–12, 21–29, 17–12, 21–10
Pts: N. Rogkavopoulos 28; Rebs: N. Rogkavopoulos 8 Asts: D. Klonaras 5		Pts: O. Kovliar 17; Rebs: I. Serheiev 10; Asts: I. Zaiets 3

Universiada Hall, Sofia
Referees: Martin Horozov (BUL), Janusz Calik (POL), Carlos Peralta (ECU)

17 August 2017
16:00

Boxscore

Great Britain	85–54	Hungary
Scoring by quarter: 23–16, 21–14, 18–14, 23–10
Pts: C. Feeney 17; Rebs: M. Okros 9 Asts: M. Okros 4		Pts: T. Pallai 10; Rebs: A. Balsay 5 Asts: P. Veraszto 3

Universiada Hall, Sofia
Referees: Haris Bijedić (BIH), Jayson Anthony Steill (CAN), Miroslav Tomov (BUL)

17 August 2017
18:15

Boxscore

Netherlands	65–51	Belgium
Scoring by quarter: 11–16, 14–7, 18–8, 22–20
Pts: K. van der Vuurst de Vries 18; Rebs: R. Mast 13; Asts: J. Bergens 4		Pts: N. De Ridder 14; Rebs: H. Bratanovic 15; Asts: S. Dibongue Swenson 2

Universiada Hall, Sofia
Referees: Zdenko Tomasevic (SVK), Sebastien Clivaz (SUI), Petar Denkovski (MKD)

17 August 2017
20:30

Boxscore

Czech Republic	51–65	Georgia
Scoring by quarter: 7–16, 18–19, 9–17, 17–13
Pts: N. Noumeros 14; Rebs: M. Houser 6 Asts: M. Houser 2		Pts: R. Andronikashvili 16; Rebs: V. Tavakarashvili 16; Asts: V. Tavakarashvili 5

Universiada Hall, Sofia
Referees: Zdravko Rutešić (MNE), Georgios Poursanidis (GRE), Simon Unsworth (GBR)

=== Semifinals ===
18 August 2017
18:15

Boxscore

Greece	75–52	Great Britain
Scoring by quarter: 24–6, 16–15, 14–19, 21–12
Pts: N. Rogkavopoulos 16; Rebs: A. Tsoumanis 14; Asts: K. Vlasios 4		Pts: M. Okros 14; Rebs: T. Hughes 9 Asts: C. Feeney 6

Universiada Hall, Sofia
Referees: Zdravko Rutešić (MNE), Petar Denkovski (MKD), Zdenko Tomasevic (SVK)

18 August 2017
20:30

Boxscore

Netherlands	67–62	Georgia
Scoring by quarter: 20–15, 10–13, 12–17, 25–17
Pts: K. van der Vuurst de Vries 18; Rebs: R. Mast 17; Asts: J. Bergens 6		Pts: R. Andronikashvili 19; Rebs: I. Sulkhanishvili 8 Asts: L. Mikeladze 3

Universiada Hall, Sofia
Referees: Haris Bijedić (BIH), Janusz Calik (POL), Carlos Peralta (ECU)

=== Bronze medal game ===
19 August 2017
18:15

Boxscore

Great Britain	63–64	Georgia
Scoring by quarter: 20–4, 20–21, 5–27, 18–12
Pts: M. Okros 25; Rebs: M. Okros 9 Asts: M. Okros 4		Pts: B. Peikrishvili 21; Rebs: L. Mikeladze 8 Asts: R. Andronikashvili 7

Universiada Hall, Sofia
Referees: Haris Bijedić (BIH), Janusz Calik (POL), Georgios Poursanidis (GRE)

=== Final ===
19 August 2017
20:30

Boxscore

Greece	74–60	Netherlands
Scoring by quarter: 20–19, 19–16, 14–3, 21–22
Pts: N. Rogkavopoulos 21; Rebs: A. Tsoumanis 10; Asts: K. Vlasios 5		Pts: R. Mast 16; Rebs: J. Visser 10; Asts: K. van der Vuurst de Vries 6

Universiada Hall, Sofia
Referees: Martin Horozov (BUL), Petar Denkovski (MKD), Zdenko Tomasevic (SVK)

== 9th–24th place classification ==
=== 9th–16th place bracket ===
9th–16th place quarterfinals
17 August
Belarus	71
Bulgaria	65
17 August
Portugal	63
Ireland	77
17 August
Poland	62
Iceland	58
17 August
Bosnia and Herzegovina	82
Macedonia	67

9th–12th place semifinals
18 August
Belarus	87
Ireland	58
18 August
Poland	82
Bosnia and Herzegovina	54

9th place game
19 August
Belarus	82
Poland	73
11th place game
19 August
Ireland	83
Bosnia and Herzegovina	78

13th–16th place bracket

13th–16th place semifinals
18 August
Bulgaria	60
Portugal	55
18 August
Iceland	70
Macedonia	66

13th place game
19 August
Bulgaria	64
Iceland	71
15th place game
19 August
Portugal	50
Macedonia	56

=== 17th–24th place bracket ===
17th–24th place quarterfinals
17 August
Switzerland	61
Cyprus	51
17 August
Kosovo	66
Norway	49
17 August
Denmark	78
Romania	74
17 August
Slovakia	54
Luxembourg	59

17th–20th place semifinals
18 August
Switzerland	71
Kosovo	65
18 August
Denmark	75
Luxembourg	68

17th place game
19 August
Switzerland	98
Denmark	74
19th place game
19 August
Kosovo	64
Luxembourg	55

21st–24th place bracket

21st–24th place semifinals
18 August
Cyprus	60
Norway	51
18 August
Romania	69
Slovakia	64

21st place game
19 August
Cyprus	53
Romania	72
23rd place game
19 August
Norway	65
Slovakia	72

== Final standings ==
Rank	Team	Record
1st place, gold medalist(s)	Greece	7–0
2nd place, silver medalist(s)	Netherlands	5–2
3rd place, bronze medalist(s)	Georgia	5–2
4	Great Britain	2–5
5	Ukraine	4–3
6	Belgium	4–3
7	Hungary	4–3
8	Czech Republic	3–4
9	Belarus	5–2
10	Poland	5–2
11	Ireland	4–3
12	Bosnia and Herzegovina	1–6
13	Iceland	4–3
14	Bulgaria	1–6
15	Macedonia	1–6
16	Portugal	1–6
17	Switzerland	3–4
18	Denmark	5–2
19	Kosovo	5–2
20	Luxembourg	4–3
21	Romania	1–6
22	Cyprus	4–3
23	Slovakia	1–6
24	Norway	1–6

Promoted to the 2018 FIBA U16 European Championship Division A.

== Awards ==
FIBA U16 European Championship Division B MVP
(Greece) Nikos Rogkavopoulos
