= 2013 FIBA Europe Under-16 Championship Division B =

Tournament details
- Host country: Bosnia and Herzegovina
- City: Sarajevo
- Dates: 8–18 July 2013
- Teams: 22 (from 1 confederation)
- Venue(s): 3 (in 1 host city)

Final positions
- Champions: Denmark (1st title)
- Runners-up: Bosnia and Herzegovina
- Third place: Finland

Official website
- FIBA Archive

The 2013 FIBA U16 European Championship Division B was the 10th edition of the Division B of the European basketball championship for men's national under-16 teams. It was played from 8 to 18 July 2013 in Sarajevo, Bosnia and Herzegovina.

Denmark won the tournament.

Denmark's Jacob Larsen was the dominant player as he scored 20.0 points and pulled down 12.1 rebounds while blocking 4.0 shots a game en route to Eurobasket.com All-European Championships U16 Division B Best Player honors.

== Participating teams ==
- Austria
- Belarus
- Bosnia and Herzegovina
- Bulgaria
- Czech Republic ▼ (15th place, 2012 FIBA Europe Under-16 Championship Division A)
- Denmark
- England ▼ (16th place, 2012 FIBA Europe Under-16 Championship Division A)
- Estonia
- Finland
- Georgia
- Hungary
- Ireland
- Israel
- Luxembourg
- Macedonia
- Netherlands
- Norway
- Portugal
- Romania
- Slovakia
- Slovenia ▼ (14th place, 2012 FIBA Europe Under-16 Championship Division A)
- Switzerland

== First round ==
In the first round, the teams were drawn into four groups. The first two teams from each group advance to the quarterfinal groups; the third and fourth teams advance to the 9th–16th place classification; the other teams will play in the 17th–22nd place classification groups.

=== Group A ===
Pos	Team	Pld	W	L	PF	PA	PD	Pts	Qualification
1	Finland	5	5	0	358	260	+98	10	Quarterfinal groups
2	Macedonia	5	3	2	352	308	+44	8	Quarterfinal groups
3	Portugal	5	3	2	353	340	+13	8	9th–16th place classification
4	Estonia	5	3	2	310	293	+17	8	9th–16th place classification
5	Bulgaria	5	1	4	269	321	−52	6	17th–22nd place classification
6	Norway	5	0	5	236	356	−120	5	17th–22nd place classification

Source: FIBA Archive

8 July 2013

Boxscore

Macedonia	82–55	Norway

Sarajevo

8 July 2013

Boxscore

Estonia	69–81	Portugal

Sarajevo

8 July 2013

Boxscore

Finland	81–58	Bulgaria

Sarajevo

9 July 2013

Boxscore

Norway	47–61	Estonia

Sarajevo

9 July 2013

Boxscore

Bulgaria	49–67	Macedonia

Sarajevo

9 July 2013

Boxscore

Portugal	62–74	Finland

Sarajevo

10 July 2013

Boxscore

Bulgaria	59–38	Norway

Sarajevo

10 July 2013

Boxscore

Finland	55–45	Estonia

Sarajevo

10 July 2013

Boxscore

Macedonia	79–59	Portugal

Sarajevo

11 July 2013

Boxscore

Norway	36–71	Finland

Sarajevo

11 July 2013

Boxscore

Estonia	68–65	Macedonia

Sarajevo

11 July 2013

Boxscore

Portugal	68–58	Bulgaria

Sarajevo

12 July 2013

Boxscore

Macedonia	59–77	Finland

Sarajevo

12 July 2013

Boxscore

Portugal	83–60	Norway

Sarajevo

12 July 2013

Boxscore

Bulgaria	45–67	Estonia

Sarajevo

=== Group B ===
Pos	Team	Pld	W	L	PF	PA	PD	Pts	Qualification
1	Slovenia	4	4	0	315	249	+66	8	Quarterfinal groups
2	England	4	3	1	270	241	+29	7	Quarterfinal groups
3	Romania	4	2	2	288	279	+9	6	9th–16th place classification
4	Switzerland	4	1	3	221	286	−65	5	9th–16th place classification
5	Ireland	4	0	4	224	263	−39	4	17th–22nd place classification

Source: FIBA Archive

8 July 2013

Boxscore

England	85–76	Romania

Sarajevo

8 July 2013

Boxscore

Slovenia	85–52	Switzerland

Sarajevo

9 July 2013

Boxscore

Ireland	70–75	Slovenia

Sarajevo

9 July 2013

Boxscore

Switzerland	46–59	England

Sarajevo

10 July 2013

Boxscore

Romania	88–58	Switzerland

Sarajevo

10 July 2013

Boxscore

England	56–47	Ireland

Sarajevo

11 July 2013

Boxscore

Slovenia	72–70	England

Sarajevo

11 July 2013

Boxscore

Ireland	53–67	Romania

Sarajevo

12 July 2013

Boxscore

Romania	57–83	Slovenia

Sarajevo

12 July 2013

Boxscore

Switzerland	65–54	Ireland

Sarajevo

=== Group C ===
Pos	Team	Pld	W	L	PF	PA	PD	Pts	Qualification
1	Bosnia and Herzegovina	4	4	0	262	230	+32	8	Quarterfinal groups
2	Denmark	4	2	2	290	259	+31	6	Quarterfinal groups
3	Netherlands	4	2	2	247	229	+18	6	9th–16th place classification
4	Israel	4	2	2	288	266	+22	6	9th–16th place classification
5	Slovakia	4	0	4	210	313	−103	4	17th–22nd place classification

Source: FIBA Archive

8 July 2013

Boxscore

Israel	64–80	Denmark

Sarajevo

8 July 2013

Boxscore

Netherlands	51–53	Bosnia and Herzegovina

Sarajevo

9 July 2013

Boxscore

Slovakia	66–103	Israel

Sarajevo

9 July 2013

Boxscore

Denmark	69–73	Netherlands

Sarajevo

10 July 2013

Boxscore

Bosnia and Herzegovina	72–71	Denmark

Sarajevo

10 July 2013

Boxscore

Netherlands	68–43	Slovakia

Sarajevo

11 July 2013

Boxscore

Israel	64–55	Netherlands

Sarajevo

11 July 2013

Boxscore

Slovakia	51–72	Bosnia and Herzegovina

Sarajevo

12 July 2013

Boxscore

Denmark	70–50	Slovakia

Sarajevo

12 July 2013

Boxscore

Bosnia and Herzegovina	65–57	Israel

Sarajevo

=== Group D ===
Pos	Team	Pld	W	L	PF	PA	PD	Pts	Qualification
1	Czech Republic	5	5	0	376	259	+117	10	Quarterfinal groups
2	Georgia	5	3	2	348	285	+63	8	Quarterfinal groups
3	Austria	5	3	2	312	316	−4	8	9th–16th place classification
4	Hungary	5	2	3	348	332	+16	7	9th–16th place classification
5	Luxembourg	5	1	4	231	372	−141	6	17th–22nd place classification
6	Belarus	5	1	4	310	361	−51	6	17th–22nd place classification

Source: FIBA Archive

8 July 2013

Boxscore

Austria	66–51	Belarus

Sarajevo

8 July 2013

Boxscore

Georgia	51–52	Czech Republic

Sarajevo

8 July 2013

Boxscore

Luxembourg	54–91	Hungary

Sarajevo

9 July 2013

Boxscore

Czech Republic	86–49	Austria

Sarajevo

9 July 2013

Boxscore

Hungary	63–59	Georgia

Sarajevo

9 July 2013

Boxscore

Belarus	61–67	Luxembourg

Sarajevo

10 July 2013

Boxscore

Austria	76–71	Hungary

Sarajevo

10 July 2013

Boxscore

Czech Republic	87–59	Belarus

Sarajevo

10 July 2013

Boxscore

Georgia	83–39	Luxembourg

Sarajevo

11 July 2013

Boxscore

Belarus	66–74	Georgia

Sarajevo

11 July 2013

Boxscore

Luxembourg	27–56	Austria

Sarajevo

11 July 2013

Boxscore

Hungary	56–70	Czech Republic

Sarajevo

12 July 2013

Boxscore

Austria	65–81	Georgia

Sarajevo

12 July 2013

Boxscore

Hungary	67–73	Belarus

Sarajevo

12 July 2013

Boxscore

Czech Republic	81–44	Luxembourg

Sarajevo

== 17th–22nd place classification ==
=== Group I ===
Pos	Team	Pld	W	L	PF	PA	PD	Pts	Qualification
1	Ireland	2	2	0	125	111	+14	4	17th place match
2	Bulgaria	2	1	1	116	105	+11	3	19th place match
3	Norway	2	0	2	92	117	−25	2	21st place match

Source: FIBA Archive

14 July 2013

Boxscore

Norway	54–58	Ireland

Sarajevo

15 July 2013

Boxscore

Ireland	67–57	Bulgaria

Sarajevo

=== Group J ===
Pos	Team	Pld	W	L	PF	PA	PD	Pts	Qualification
1	Slovakia	2	1	1	137	129	+8	3	17th place match
2	Belarus	2	1	1	138	137	+1	3	19th place match
3	Luxembourg	2	1	1	119	128	−9	3	21st place match

Source: FIBA Archive

14 July 2013

Boxscore

Slovakia	70–77	Belarus

Sarajevo

15 July 2013

Boxscore

Luxembourg	52–67	Slovakia

Sarajevo

=== 17th–22nd place playoffs ===
==== 21st place match ====
18 July 2013

Boxscore

Norway	52–62	Luxembourg

Sarajevo

==== 19th place match ====
18 July 2013

Boxscore

Bulgaria	70–67	Belarus

Sarajevo

==== 17th place match ====
18 July 2013

Boxscore

Ireland	39–41	Slovakia

Sarajevo

== 9th–16th place classification ==
=== Group G ===
Pos	Team	Pld	W	L	PF	PA	PD	Pts	Qualification
1	Romania	3	3	0	224	171	+53	6	9th–12th place playoffs
2	Switzerland	3	2	1	204	213	−9	5	9th–12th place playoffs
3	Portugal	3	1	2	184	207	−23	4	13th–16th place playoffs
4	Estonia	3	0	3	204	225	−21	3	13th–16th place playoffs

Source: FIBA Archive

14 July 2013

Boxscore

Estonia	65–71	Romania

Sarajevo

14 July 2013

Boxscore

Portugal	55–73	Switzerland

Sarajevo

15 July 2013

Boxscore

Switzerland	73–70	Estonia

Sarajevo

15 July 2013

Boxscore

Romania	65–48	Portugal

Sarajevo

=== Group H ===
Pos	Team	Pld	W	L	PF	PA	PD	Pts	Qualification
1	Israel	3	3	0	239	154	+85	6	9th–12th place playoffs
2	Netherlands	3	2	1	202	187	+15	5	9th–12th place playoffs
3	Austria	3	1	2	180	242	−62	4	13th–16th place playoffs
4	Hungary	3	0	3	189	227	−38	3	13th–16th place playoffs

Source: FIBA Archive

14 July 2013

Boxscore

Netherlands	69–61	Hungary

Sarajevo

14 July 2013

Boxscore

Israel	93–42	Austria

Sarajevo

15 July 2013

Boxscore

Austria	62–78	Netherlands

Sarajevo

15 July 2013

Boxscore

Hungary	57–82	Israel

Sarajevo

=== 13th–16th place playoffs ===
13th–16th place semifinals
G3	Portugal	61
H4	Hungary	68
H3	Austria	73
G4	Estonia	55

13th place match
H4	Hungary	60
H3	Austria	57
15th place match
G3	Portugal	60
G4	Estonia	54

==== 13th–16th place semifinals ====
17 July 2013

Boxscore

Portugal	61–68	Hungary

Sarajevo

17 July 2013

Boxscore

Austria	73–55	Estonia

Sarajevo

==== 15th place match ====
18 July 2013

Boxscore

Portugal	60–54	Estonia

Sarajevo

==== 13th place match ====
18 July 2013

Boxscore

Hungary	60–57	Austria

Sarajevo

=== 9th–12th place playoffs ===
9th–12th place semifinals
G1	Romania	58
H2	Netherlands	47
H1	Israel	91
G2	Switzerland	62

9th place match
G1	Romania	70
H1	Israel	87
11th place match
H2	Netherlands	65
G2	Switzerland	68

==== 9th–12th place semifinals ====
17 July 2013

Boxscore

Romania	58–47	Netherlands

Sarajevo

17 July 2013

Boxscore

Israel	91–62	Switzerland

Sarajevo

==== 11th place match ====
18 July 2013

Boxscore

Netherlands	65–68	Switzerland

Sarajevo

==== 9th place match ====
18 July 2013

Boxscore

Romania	70–87	Israel

Sarajevo

== 1st–8th place classification ==
=== Group E ===
Pos	Team	Pld	W	L	PF	PA	PD	Pts	Qualification
1	Finland	3	3	0	235	198	+37	6	Semifinals
2	Slovenia	3	2	1	227	222	+5	5	Semifinals
3	England	3	1	2	187	197	−10	4	5th–8th place playoffs
4	Macedonia	3	0	3	178	210	−32	3	5th–8th place playoffs

Source: FIBA Archive

14 July 2013

Boxscore

Finland	70–60	England

Sarajevo

14 July 2013

Boxscore

Macedonia	64–76	Slovenia

Sarajevo

15 July 2013

Boxscore

Slovenia	79–88	Finland

Sarajevo

15 July 2013

Boxscore

England	57–55	Macedonia

Sarajevo

=== Group F ===
Pos	Team	Pld	W	L	PF	PA	PD	Pts	Qualification
1	Bosnia and Herzegovina	3	3	0	216	193	+23	6	Semifinals
2	Denmark	3	2	1	214	188	+26	5	Semifinals
3	Czech Republic	3	1	2	165	189	−24	4	5th–8th place playoffs
4	Georgia	3	0	3	176	201	−25	3	5th–8th place playoffs

Source: FIBA Archive

14 July 2013

Boxscore

Bosnia and Herzegovina	75–63	Georgia

Sarajevo

14 July 2013

Boxscore

Denmark	69–54	Czech Republic

Sarajevo

15 July 2013

Boxscore

Czech Republic	59–69	Bosnia and Herzegovina

Sarajevo

15 July 2013

Boxscore

Georgia	62–74	Denmark

Sarajevo

=== 5th–8th place playoffs ===
5th–8th place semifinals
E3	England	80
F4	Georgia	52
F3	Czech Republic	82
E4	Macedonia	75

5th place match
E3	England	58
F3	Czech Republic	72
7th place match
F4	Georgia	86
E4	Macedonia	64

==== 5th–8th place semifinals ====
17 July 2013

Boxscore

England	80–52	Georgia

Sarajevo

17 July 2013

Boxscore

Czech Republic	82–75	Macedonia

Sarajevo

==== 7th place match ====
18 July 2013

Boxscore

Georgia	86–64	Macedonia

Sarajevo

==== 5th place match ====
18 July 2013

Boxscore

England	58–72	Czech Republic

Sarajevo

=== Championship playoffs ===
Semifinals
E1	Finland	56
F2	Denmark	87
F1	Bosnia and Herzegovina	70
E2	Slovenia	62

Final
F2	Denmark	72
F1	Bosnia and Herzegovina	69
3rd place match
E1	Finland	96
E2	Slovenia	62

==== Semifinals ====
17 July 2013

Boxscore

Finland	56–87	Denmark

Sarajevo

17 July 2013

Boxscore

Bosnia and Herzegovina	70–62	Slovenia

Sarajevo

==== 3rd place match ====
18 July 2013

Boxscore

Finland	96–62	Slovenia

Sarajevo

==== Final ====
18 July 2013

Boxscore

Denmark	72–69	Bosnia and Herzegovina

Sarajevo

== Final standings ==
Rank	Team
1st place, gold medalist(s)	Denmark
2nd place, silver medalist(s)	Bosnia and Herzegovina
3rd place, bronze medalist(s)	Finland
4	Slovenia
5	Czech Republic
6	England
7	Georgia
8	Macedonia
9	Israel
10	Romania
11	Switzerland
12	Netherlands
13	Hungary
14	Austria
15	Portugal
16	Estonia
17	Slovakia
18	Ireland
19	Bulgaria
20	Belarus
21	Luxembourg
22	Norway

Promoted to the 2014 FIBA Europe Under-16 Championship Division A

== See also ==
- 2013 FIBA Europe Under-16 Championship (Division A)
