= 2019 FIBA U16 European Championship Division B =

Tournament details
- Host country: Montenegro
- City: Podgorica
- Dates: 8–17 August 2019
- Teams: 24 (from 1 confederation)
- Venue(s): 3 (in 1 host city)

Final positions
- Champions: Poland (2nd title)
- Runners-up: Netherlands
- Third place: Denmark
- Fourth place: Montenegro

Official website
- www.fiba.basketball

The 2019 FIBA U16 European Championship Division B was the 16th edition of the Division B of the FIBA U16 European Championship. It was played in Podgorica, Montenegro, from 8 to 17 August 2019. 24 teams participated in the competition. Poland men's national under-16 basketball team won the tournament.

Poland's Jeremy Sochan got elected as tournament MVP.

== Participating teams ==
- Austria ▲ (3rd place, 2018 FIBA U16 European Championship Division C)
- Belarus
- Belgium
- Bulgaria
- Cyprus
- Czech Republic
- Denmark
- Finland
- Georgia ▼ (16th place, 2018 FIBA U16 European Championship Division A)
- Great Britain
- Hungary
- Iceland
- Ireland
- Kosovo
- Montenegro ▼ (14th place, 2018 FIBA U16 European Championship Division A)
- Netherlands ▼ (15th place, 2018 FIBA U16 European Championship Division A)
- Norway
- Poland
- Portugal
- Romania
- Slovakia
- Sweden
- Switzerland
- Ukraine

== First round ==
=== Group A ===
Pos	Team	Pld	W	L	PF	PA	PD	Pts	Team advances to
1	Poland	5	5	0	453	267	+186	10	Quarterfinals
2	Bulgaria	5	4	1	385	295	+90	9	Quarterfinals
3	Sweden	5	3	2	343	309	+34	8	9th–16th place playoffs
4	Hungary	5	2	3	332	298	+34	7	9th–16th place playoffs
5	Kosovo	5	1	4	241	398	−157	6	17th–24th place playoffs
6	Norway	5	0	5	266	453	−187	5	17th–24th place playoffs

Source: FIBA

=== Group B ===
Pos	Team	Pld	W	L	PF	PA	PD	Pts	Team advances to
1	Netherlands	5	5	0	370	336	+34	10	Quarterfinals
2	Czech Republic	5	4	1	375	322	+53	9	Quarterfinals
3	Portugal	5	3	2	344	297	+47	8	9th–16th place playoffs
4	Ireland	5	2	3	343	344	−1	7	9th–16th place playoffs
5	Georgia	5	1	4	302	343	−41	6	17th–24th place playoffs
6	Cyprus	5	0	5	275	367	−92	5	17th–24th place playoffs

Source: FIBA

=== Group C ===
Pos	Team	Pld	W	L	PF	PA	PD	Pts	Team advances to
1	Denmark	5	5	0	388	304	+84	10	Quarterfinals
2	Montenegro	5	4	1	380	340	+40	9	Quarterfinals
3	Iceland	5	3	2	327	354	−27	8	9th–16th place playoffs
4	Ukraine	5	2	3	378	348	+30	7	9th–16th place playoffs
5	Belarus	5	1	4	329	355	−26	6	17th–24th place playoffs
6	Switzerland	5	0	5	292	393	−101	5	17th–24th place playoffs

Source: FIBA

=== Group D ===
Pos	Team	Pld	W	L	PF	PA	PD	Pts	Team advances to
1	Belgium	5	5	0	448	293	+155	10	Quarterfinals
2	Romania	5	4	1	387	342	+45	9	Quarterfinals
3	Finland	5	3	2	330	333	−3	8	9th–16th place playoffs
4	Great Britain	5	2	3	326	351	−25	7	9th–16th place playoffs
5	Slovakia	5	1	4	316	360	−44	6	17th–24th place playoffs
6	Austria	5	0	5	285	413	−128	5	17th–24th place playoffs

Source: FIBA

== Playoffs ==
=== 17th–24th place playoffs ===
21st place match
C6	Switzerland	71
D6	Austria	72
23rd place match
A5	Kosovo	44
A6	Norway	84

21st–24th place semifinals
A5	Kosovo	55
C6	Switzerland	68
A6	Norway	53
D6	Austria	73

17th–24th place quarterfinals
A5	Kosovo	54
B6	Cyprus	71
D5	Slovakia	80
C6	Switzerland	53
B5	Georgia	78
A6	Norway	62
C5	Belarus	76
D6	Austria	56

17th–20th place semifinals
B6	Cyprus	65
D5	Slovakia	59
B5	Georgia	61
C5	Belarus	68

17th place match
B6	Cyprus	42
C5	Belarus	56
19th place match
D5	Slovakia	87
B5	Georgia	86

=== 9th–16th place playoffs ===
13th place match
D3	Finland	91
A4	Hungary	61
15th place match
B4	Ireland	67
C3	Iceland	75

13th–16th place semifinals
B4	Ireland	64
D3	Finland	83
A4	Hungary	90
C3	Iceland	62

9th–16th place quarterfinals
A3	Sweden	82
B4	Ireland	74
D3	Finland	76
C4	Ukraine	92
B3	Portugal	69
A4	Hungary	63
C3	Iceland	83
D4	Great Britain	84

9th–12th place semifinals
A3	Sweden	65
C4	Ukraine	92
B3	Portugal	69
D4	Great Britain	73

9th place match
C4	Ukraine	83
D4	Great Britain	60
11th place match
A3	Sweden	65
B3	Portugal	67

=== Championship playoffs ===
5th place match
D1	Belgium	74
A2	Bulgaria	57
7th place match
B2	Czech Republic	92
D2	Romania	69

5th–8th place semifinals
B2	Czech Republic	87
D1	Belgium	93
A2	Bulgaria	79
D2	Romania	77

Quarterfinals
A1	Poland	89
B2	Czech Republic	77
D1	Belgium	72
C2	Montenegro	79
B1	Netherlands	102
A2	Bulgaria	90
C1	Denmark	86
D2	Romania	70

Semifinals
A1	Poland	72
C2	Montenegro	65
B1	Netherlands	73
C1	Denmark	68

Final
A1	Poland	71
B1	Netherlands	58
3rd place match
C2	Montenegro	54
C1	Denmark	85

== Final standings ==
Rank	Team
1st place, gold medalist(s)	Poland
2nd place, silver medalist(s)	Netherlands
3rd place, bronze medalist(s)	Denmark
4	Montenegro
5	Belgium
6	Bulgaria
7	Czech Republic
8	Romania
9	Ukraine
10	Great Britain
11	Portugal
12	Sweden
13	Finland
14	Hungary
15	Iceland
16	Ireland
17	Belarus
18	Cyprus
19	Slovakia
20	Georgia
21	Austria
22	Switzerland
23	Norway
24	Kosovo

Promoted to the 2022 FIBA U16 European Championship Division A
Promoted to the 2022 FIBA U16 European Championship Division A after exclusion of Russia
Relegated to the 2022 FIBA U16 European Championship Division C
