= 2015 FIBA Europe Under-16 Championship Division B =

Tournament details
- Host country: Bulgaria
- City: Sofia
- Dates: 6–16 August 2015
- Teams: 24 (from 1 confederation)
- Venue: 3 (in 1 host city)

Final positions
- Champions: Estonia (1st title)
- Runners-up: Poland
- Third place: Sweden

Tournament statistics
- MVP: (Estonia) Sander Raieste

Official website
- FIBA Archive

The 2015 FIBA U16 European Championship Division B was the 12th edition of the Division B of the European basketball championship for men's national under-16 teams. It was played from 6 to 16 August 2015 in Sofia, Bulgaria. Estonia men's national under-16 basketball team won the tournament.

== Participating teams ==
- Austria
- Belarus
- Belgium
- Bulgaria
- Czech Republic
- Denmark ▼ (16th place, 2014 FIBA Europe Under-16 Championship Division A)
- Estonia
- Georgia
- Hungary
- Iceland
- Ireland
- Luxembourg
- Macedonia
- Netherlands
- Norway
- Poland ▼ (15th place, 2014 FIBA Europe Under-16 Championship Division A)
- Portugal
- Romania
- Scotland
- Slovakia
- Slovenia
- Sweden
- Switzerland
- Ukraine ▼ (14th place, 2014 FIBA Europe Under-16 Championship Division A)

== First round ==
In the first round, the teams were drawn into four groups of six. The first two teams from each group advance to the quarterfinal groups; the third and fourth teams advance to the 9th–16th place classification; the other teams will play in the 17th–24th place classification groups.

=== Group A ===
Pos	Team	Pld	W	L	PF	PA	PD	Pts	Qualification
1	Poland	5	5	0	382	273	+109	10	Quarterfinal groups
2	Slovakia	5	3	2	342	283	+59	8	Quarterfinal groups
3	Denmark	5	3	2	328	311	+17	8	9th–16th place classification
4	Bulgaria	5	2	3	339	294	+45	7	9th–16th place classification
5	Romania	5	2	3	327	281	+46	7	17th–24th place classification
6	Scotland	5	0	5	183	459	−276	5	17th–24th place classification

Source: FIBA Archive

6 August 2015

Boxscore

Romania	55–63	Poland

Sofia

6 August 2015

Boxscore

Slovakia	64–47	Denmark

Sofia

6 August 2015

Boxscore

Scotland	32–90	Bulgaria

Sofia

7 August 2015

Boxscore

Denmark	88–44	Scotland

Sofia

7 August 2015

Boxscore

Poland	79–51	Slovakia

Sofia

7 August 2015

Boxscore

Bulgaria	58–50	Romania

Sofia

8 August 2015

Boxscore

Poland	81–62	Denmark

Sofia

8 August 2015

Boxscore

Romania	99–37	Scotland

Sofia

8 August 2015

Boxscore

Slovakia	76–62	Bulgaria

Sofia

9 August 2015

Boxscore

Scotland	31–91	Slovakia

Sofia

9 August 2015

Boxscore

Denmark	63–59	Romania

Sofia

9 August 2015

Boxscore

Bulgaria	66–68	Poland

Sofia

10 August 2015

Boxscore

Slovakia	60–64	Romania

Sofia

10 August 2015

Boxscore

Poland	91–39	Scotland

Sofia

10 August 2015

Boxscore

Bulgaria	63–68	Denmark

Sofia

=== Group B ===
Pos	Team	Pld	W	L	PF	PA	PD	Pts	Qualification
1	Slovenia	5	5	0	381	278	+103	10	Quarterfinal groups
2	Netherlands	5	4	1	326	249	+77	9	Quarterfinal groups
3	Austria	5	2	3	322	371	−49	7	9th–16th place classification
4	Czech Republic	5	2	3	355	335	+20	7	9th–16th place classification
5	Ireland	5	1	4	307	396	−89	6	17th–24th place classification
6	Norway	5	1	4	276	338	−62	6	17th–24th place classification

Source: FIBA Archive

6 August 2015

Boxscore

Ireland	65–74	Austria

Sofia

6 August 2015

Boxscore

Netherlands	50–59	Slovenia

Sofia

6 August 2015

Boxscore

Norway	37–61	Czech Republic

Sofia

7 August 2015

Boxscore

Austria	58–84	Netherlands

Sofia

7 August 2015

Boxscore

Slovenia	82–58	Norway

Sofia

7 August 2015

Boxscore

Czech Republic	93–83	Ireland

Sofia

8 August 2015

Boxscore

Norway	75–70	Austria

Sofia

8 August 2015

Boxscore

Netherlands	74–32	Ireland

Sofia

8 August 2015

Boxscore

Slovenia	75–70	Czech Republic

Sofia

9 August 2015

Boxscore

Ireland	66–63	Norway

Sofia

9 August 2015

Boxscore

Austria	39–73	Slovenia

Sofia

9 August 2015

Boxscore

Czech Republic	57–59	Netherlands

Sofia

10 August 2015

Boxscore

Slovenia	92–61	Ireland

Sofia

10 August 2015

Boxscore

Austria	81–74	Czech Republic

Sofia

10 August 2015

Boxscore

Norway	43–59	Netherlands

Sofia

=== Group C ===
Pos	Team	Pld	W	L	PF	PA	PD	Pts	Qualification
1	Belgium	5	5	0	357	228	+129	10	Quarterfinal groups
2	Georgia	5	4	1	346	259	+87	9	Quarterfinal groups
3	Hungary	5	3	2	312	299	+13	8	9th–16th place classification
4	Switzerland	5	2	3	291	356	−65	7	9th–16th place classification
5	Luxembourg	5	1	4	313	379	−66	6	17th–24th place classification
6	Belarus	5	0	5	277	375	−98	5	17th–24th place classification

Source: FIBA Archive

6 August 2015

Boxscore

Georgia	46–60	Belgium

Sofia

6 August 2015

Boxscore

Luxembourg	68–72	Switzerland

Sofia

6 August 2015

Boxscore

Belarus	53–62	Hungary

Sofia

7 August 2015

Boxscore

Switzerland	47–83	Georgia

Sofia

7 August 2015

Boxscore

Hungary	77–70	Luxembourg

Sofia

7 August 2015

Boxscore

Belgium	81–37	Belarus

Sofia

8 August 2015

Boxscore

Georgia	77–43	Luxembourg

Sofia

8 August 2015

Boxscore

Belgium	57–52	Hungary

Sofia

8 August 2015

Boxscore

Belarus	60–62	Switzerland

Sofia

9 August 2015

Boxscore

Luxembourg	85–69	Belarus

Sofia

9 August 2015

Boxscore

Hungary	51–55	Georgia

Sofia

9 August 2015

Boxscore

Switzerland	46–75	Belgium

Sofia

10 August 2015

Boxscore

Belgium	84–47	Luxembourg

Sofia

10 August 2015

Boxscore

Switzerland	64–70	Hungary

Sofia

10 August 2015

Boxscore

Belarus	58–85	Georgia

Sofia

=== Group D ===
Pos	Team	Pld	W	L	PF	PA	PD	Pts	Qualification
1	Estonia	5	5	0	444	262	+182	10	Quarterfinal groups
2	Sweden	5	4	1	359	276	+83	9	Quarterfinal groups
3	Portugal	5	2	3	284	323	−39	7	9th–16th place classification
4	Ukraine	5	2	3	343	371	−28	7	9th–16th place classification
5	Iceland	5	1	4	285	379	−94	6	17th–24th place classification
6	Macedonia	5	1	4	282	386	−104	6	17th–24th place classification

Source: FIBA Archive

6 August 2015

Boxscore

Estonia	71–49	Sweden

Sofia

6 August 2015

Boxscore

Iceland	52–66	Portugal

Sofia

6 August 2015

Boxscore

Macedonia	64–86	Ukraine

Sofia

7 August 2015

Boxscore

Sweden	82–42	Iceland

Sofia

7 August 2015

Boxscore

Ukraine	64–95	Estonia

Sofia

7 August 2015

Boxscore

Portugal	40–51	Macedonia

Sofia

8 August 2015

Boxscore

Ukraine	55–66	Sweden

Sofia

8 August 2015

Boxscore

Macedonia	59–74	Iceland

Sofia

8 August 2015

Boxscore

Estonia	94–40	Portugal

Sofia

9 August 2015

Boxscore

Sweden	92–55	Macedonia

Sofia

9 August 2015

Boxscore

Portugal	85–56	Ukraine

Sofia

9 August 2015

Boxscore

Iceland	56–90	Estonia

Sofia

10 August 2015

Boxscore

Portugal	53–70	Sweden

Sofia

10 August 2015

Boxscore

Estonia	94–53	Macedonia

Sofia

10 August 2015

Boxscore

Ukraine	82–61	Iceland

Sofia

== 17th–24th place classification ==
=== Group I ===
Pos	Team	Pld	W	L	PF	PA	PD	Pts	Qualification
1	Romania	3	3	0	239	141	+98	6	17th–20th place playoffs
2	Ireland	3	2	1	211	220	−9	5	17th–20th place playoffs
3	Norway	3	1	2	216	174	+42	4	21st–24th place playoffs
4	Scotland	3	0	3	162	293	−131	3	21st–24th place playoffs

Source: FIBA Archive

12 August 2015

Boxscore

Scotland	78–91	Ireland

Sofia

12 August 2015

Boxscore

Romania	61–50	Norway

Sofia

13 August 2015

Boxscore

Norway	103–47	Scotland

Sofia

13 August 2015

Boxscore

Ireland	54–79	Romania

Sofia

=== Group J ===
Pos	Team	Pld	W	L	PF	PA	PD	Pts	Qualification
1	Iceland	3	3	0	215	173	+42	6	17th–20th place playoffs
2	Luxembourg	3	2	1	209	208	+1	5	17th–20th place playoffs
3	Macedonia	3	1	2	200	217	−17	4	21st–24th place playoffs
4	Belarus	3	0	3	202	228	−26	3	21st–24th place playoffs

Source: FIBA Archive

12 August 2015

Boxscore

Belarus	60–69	Iceland

Sofia

12 August 2015

Boxscore

Luxembourg	70–67	Macedonia

Sofia

13 August 2015

Boxscore

Macedonia	74–73	Belarus

Sofia

13 August 2015

Boxscore

Iceland	72–54	Luxembourg

Sofia

=== 21st–24th place playoffs ===
21st–24th place semifinals
I3	Norway	87
J4	Belarus	54
J3	Macedonia	76
I4	Scotland	55

21st place match
I3	Norway	76
J3	Macedonia	63
23rd place match
J4	Belarus	71
I4	Scotland	79

==== 21st–24th place semifinals ====
15 August 2015

Boxscore

Norway	87–54	Belarus

Sofia

15 August 2015

Boxscore

Macedonia	76–55	Scotland

Sofia

==== 23rd place match ====
16 August 2015

Boxscore

Belarus	71–79	Scotland

Sofia

==== 21st place match ====
16 August 2015

Boxscore

Norway	76–63	Macedonia

Sofia

=== 17th–20th place playoffs ===
17th–20th place semifinals
I1	Romania	79
J2	Luxembourg	46
J1	Iceland	87
I2	Ireland	75

17th place match
I1	Romania	79
J1	Iceland	72
19th place match
J2	Luxembourg	84
I2	Ireland	88

==== 17th–20th place semifinals ====
15 August 2015

Boxscore

Romania	79–46	Luxembourg

Sofia

15 August 2015

Boxscore

Iceland	87–75	Ireland

Sofia

==== 19th place match ====
16 August 2015

Boxscore

Luxembourg	84–88	Ireland

Sofia

==== 17th place match ====
16 August 2015

Boxscore

Romania	79–72	Iceland

Sofia

== 9th–16th place classification ==
=== Group G ===
Pos	Team	Pld	W	L	PF	PA	PD	Pts	Qualification
1	Denmark	3	3	0	190	177	+13	6	9th–12th place playoffs
2	Bulgaria	3	2	1	218	193	+25	5	9th–12th place playoffs
3	Austria	3	1	2	186	199	−13	4	13th–16th place playoffs
4	Czech Republic	3	0	3	208	233	−25	3	13th–16th place playoffs

Source: FIBA Archive

12 August 2015

Boxscore

Bulgaria	69–51	Austria

Sofia

12 August 2015

Boxscore

Denmark	66–60	Czech Republic

Sofia

13 August 2015

Boxscore

Czech Republic	74–86	Bulgaria

Sofia

13 August 2015

Boxscore

Austria	54–56	Denmark

Sofia

=== Group H ===
Pos	Team	Pld	W	L	PF	PA	PD	Pts	Qualification
1	Portugal	3	3	0	209	139	+70	6	9th–12th place playoffs
2	Ukraine	3	2	1	202	221	−19	5	9th–12th place playoffs
3	Hungary	3	1	2	188	205	−17	4	13th–16th place playoffs
4	Switzerland	3	0	3	165	199	−34	3	13th–16th place playoffs

Source: FIBA Archive

12 August 2015

Boxscore

Switzerland	36–58	Portugal

Sofia

12 August 2015

Boxscore

Hungary	71–75	Ukraine

Sofia

13 August 2015

Boxscore

Ukraine	71–65	Switzerland

Sofia

13 August 2015

Boxscore

Portugal	66–47	Hungary

Sofia

=== 13th–16th place playoffs ===
13th–16th place semifinals
G3	Austria	89
H4	Switzerland	41
H3	Hungary	55
G4	Czech Republic	54

13th place match
G3	Austria	65
H3	Hungary	72
15th place match
H4	Switzerland	55
G4	Czech Republic	43

==== 13th–16th place semifinals ====
15 August 2015

Boxscore

Austria	89–41	Switzerland

Sofia

15 August 2015

Boxscore

Hungary	55–54	Czech Republic

Sofia

==== 15th place match ====
16 August 2015

Boxscore

Switzerland	55–43	Czech Republic

Sofia

==== 13th place match ====
16 August 2015

Boxscore

Austria	65–72	Hungary

Sofia

=== 9th–12th place playoffs ===
9th–12th place semifinals
G1	Denmark	64
H2	Ukraine	77
H1	Portugal	58
G2	Bulgaria	67

9th place match
H2	Ukraine	58
G2	Bulgaria	73
11th place match
G1	Denmark	45
H1	Portugal	37

==== 9th–12th place semifinals ====
15 August 2015

Boxscore

Denmark	64–77	Ukraine

Sofia

15 August 2015

Boxscore

Portugal	58–67	Bulgaria

Sofia

==== 11th place match ====
16 August 2015

Boxscore

Denmark	45–37	Portugal

Sofia

==== 9th place match ====
16 August 2015

Boxscore

Ukraine	58–73	Bulgaria

Sofia

== 1st–8th place classification ==
=== Group E ===
Pos	Team	Pld	W	L	PF	PA	PD	Pts	Qualification
1	Poland	3	3	0	204	162	+42	6	Semifinals
2	Slovakia	3	2	1	181	197	−16	5	Semifinals
3	Slovenia	3	1	2	191	192	−1	4	5th–8th place playoffs
4	Netherlands	3	0	3	147	172	−25	3	5th–8th place playoffs

Source: FIBA Archive

12 August 2015

Boxscore

Slovakia	72–68	Slovenia

Sofia

12 August 2015

Boxscore

Poland	55–47	Netherlands

Sofia

13 August 2015

Boxscore

Netherlands	50–58	Slovakia

Sofia

13 August 2015

Boxscore

Slovenia	64–70	Poland

Sofia

=== Group F ===
Pos	Team	Pld	W	L	PF	PA	PD	Pts	Qualification
1	Estonia	3	3	0	194	151	+43	6	Semifinals
2	Sweden	3	2	1	207	187	+20	5	Semifinals
3	Belgium	3	1	2	149	175	−26	4	5th–8th place playoffs
4	Georgia	3	0	3	175	212	−37	3	5th–8th place playoffs

Source: FIBA Archive

12 August 2015

Boxscore

Georgia	63–72	Estonia

Sofia

12 August 2015

Boxscore

Belgium	50–78	Sweden

Sofia

13 August 2015

Boxscore

Sweden	80–66	Georgia

Sofia

13 August 2015

Boxscore

Estonia	51–39	Belgium

Sofia

=== 5th–8th place playoffs ===
5th–8th place semifinals
E3	Slovenia	64
F4	Georgia	71
F3	Belgium	71
E4	Netherlands	48

5th place match
F4	Georgia	60
F3	Belgium	43
7th place match
E3	Slovenia	69
E4	Netherlands	58

==== 5th–8th place semifinals ====
15 August 2015

Boxscore

Slovenia	64–71	Georgia

Sofia

15 August 2015

Boxscore

Belgium	71–48	Netherlands

Sofia

==== 7th place match ====
16 August 2015

Boxscore

Slovenia	69–58	Netherlands

Sofia

==== 5th place match ====
16 August 2015

Boxscore

Georgia	60–43	Belgium

Sofia

=== Championship playoffs ===
Semifinals
E1	Poland	70
F2	Sweden	63
F1	Estonia	68
E2	Slovakia	46

Final
E1	Poland	56
F1	Estonia	64
3rd place match
F2	Sweden	57
E2	Slovakia	56

==== Semifinals ====
15 August 2015

Boxscore

Poland	70–63	Sweden

Sofia

15 August 2015

Boxscore

Estonia	68–46	Slovakia

Sofia

==== 3rd place match ====
16 August 2015

Boxscore

Sweden	57–56	Slovakia

Sofia

==== Final ====
16 August 2015

Boxscore

Poland	56–64	Estonia

Sofia

== Final standings ==
Rank	Team
1st place, gold medalist(s)	Estonia
2nd place, silver medalist(s)	Poland
3rd place, bronze medalist(s)	Sweden
4	Slovakia
5	Georgia
6	Belgium
7	Slovenia
8	Netherlands
9	Bulgaria
10	Ukraine
11	Denmark
12	Portugal
13	Hungary
14	Austria
15	Switzerland
16	Czech Republic
17	Romania
18	Iceland
19	Ireland
20	Luxembourg
21	Norway
22	Macedonia
23	Scotland
24	Belarus

Promoted to the 2016 FIBA U16 European Championship Division A

== Awards ==
Most Valuable Player
(Estonia) Sander Raieste

All-Tournament Team

- (Estonia) Sander Raieste
- (Estonia) Kristian Kullamäe
- (Poland) Dominik Tomasz Wilczek
- (Sweden) David Czerapowicz
- (Georgia (country)) Goga Bitadze

== See also ==
- 2015 FIBA Europe Under-16 Championship (Division A)
