= Estonia men's national under-16 basketball team =

Estonia
- FIBA zone: FIBA Europe
- National federation: Eesti Korvpalliliit
- Coach: Alessio Landra

U17 World Cup
- Appearances: None

U16 EuroBasket
- Appearances: 5
- Medals: None

U16 EuroBasket Division B
- Appearances: 15
- Medals: Gold: 2 (2015, 2024); Bronze: 1 (2026)
Home	Away

The Estonia men's national under-16 basketball team is a national basketball team of Estonia, administered by the Estonian Basketball Association. It represents the country in international under-16 men's basketball competitions.

== FIBA U16 EuroBasket participations ==
Year	Division A	Division B
2004		11th/12th
2005		5th
2006		12th
2007		12th
2008		10th
2010		16th
2011		12th
2012		17th
2013		16th
2014		14th

Year	Division A	Division B
2015		1st place, gold medalist(s)
2016	13th	
2017	12th	
2018	11th	
2019	15th	
2022		18th
2023		6th
2024		1st place, gold medalist(s)
2025	14th	
2026		3rd place, bronze medalist(s)

== 2024 squad ==
- Andreas Pärn (KK Pärnu), 1.81 m (5 ft 11 in)
- Kaspar Vuks (Rae Koss/Hansaviimistlus), 1.90 m (6 ft 3 in)
- Mattias Mändmets (Rae Koss/Hansaviimistlus), 1.86 m (6 ft 1 in)
- Stenver Põder (TSA Kalev), 1.95 m (6 ft 5 in)
- Jesper Roman (KK Pärnu), 1.93 m (6 ft 4 in)
- Jaagup Pajumets (Keila KK / Audentese SG), 1.93 m (6 ft 4 in)
- Rasmus Vuks (Rae Koss/Hansaviimistlus), 1.90 m (6 ft 3 in)
- Hendrik Pertel (United Eagles Basketball, ITA), 1.97 m (6 ft 6 in)
- Sten Markus Adamson (TÜ ASK), 2.00 m (6 ft 7 in)
- Silver Esnar (Jena Science City, GER), 2.03 m (6 ft 8 in)
- Kenneth-Hans Möldre (KK Viimsi), 1.93 m (6 ft 4 in)
- Roman Avdejev (Reinar Halliku KK), 2.03 m (6 ft 8 in) MVP
- Head coach: Brett Nõmm
- Assistant coach: Mario Paiste

== See also ==
- Estonia men's national basketball team
- Estonia men's national under-18 basketball team
- Estonia women's national under-16 basketball team
