= Belarus men's national under-16 basketball team =

Belarus
- FIBA zone: FIBA Europe
- National federation: Belarusian Basketball Federation

Under-17 World Cup
- Appearances: None

U16 European Championship
- Appearances: None

U16 European Championship Division B
- Appearances: 12
- Medals: None
Home	Away

The Belarus men's national under-16 basketball team is a national basketball team of Belarus, administered by the Belarusian Basketball Federation. It represented the country in international men's under-16 basketball competitions.

After the 2022 Russian invasion of Ukraine, the FIBA suspended Belarus from participating in basketball and 3x3 basketball competitions.

== FIBA U16 European Championship participations ==
Year	Result in Division B
2004	13th/14th
2007	15th
2008	6st
2009	11th
2010	18th
2012	10th

Year	Result in Division B
2013	20th
2015	24th
2016	6th
2017	9rd
2018	16th
2019	17th

== See also ==
- Belarus men's national basketball team
- Belarus men's national under-18 basketball team
- Belarus women's national under-17 basketball team
