= Bosnia and Herzegovina men's national under-16 and under-17 basketball team =

Bosnia and Herzegovina
- FIBA zone: FIBA Europe
- National federation: Košarkaški savez Bosne i Hercegovine
- Coach: (Bosnia and Herzegovina) Ahmet Pašalić
- Nickname(s): Zlatni ljiljani (The Golden Lilies); Zmajevi (The Dragons)

U17 World Cup
- Appearances: 1
- Medals: None

U16 EuroBasket
- Appearances: 4
- Medals: Gold: 1 (2015)

U16 EuroBasket Division B
- Appearances: 15
- Medals: Silver: 2 (2013, 2018); Bronze: 2 (2004, 2011)
Home	Away

The Bosnia and Herzegovina men's national under-16 and under-17 basketball team is a national basketball team of Bosnia and Herzegovina, administered by the Basketball Federation of Bosnia and Herzegovina. It represents the country in international under-16 and under-17 men's basketball competitions.

== FIBA U16 EuroBasket ==
On 27 July 2007, in the first game of the 2007 FIBA Europe Under-16 Championship Division B, Bosnia and Herzegovina defeated Armenia by the score of 236–27, becoming one of the highest margin wins ever in any international game.

Bosnia and Herzegovina won two gold medals in 2015, winning both the 2015 European Youth Summer Olympic Festival as well as the 2015 FIBA U16 European Championship. Winning the European Under-16 Championship caused massive celebrations throughout the streets of Bosnia.

On 17 August 2015 in Sarajevo, close to 50,000 Bosnia and Herzegovina national team supporters welcomed the under-16 European champions home.

Year	Division A	Division B	Head coach
2004		3rd place, bronze medalist(s)	
2005		4th	
2006		5th	
2007		5th	
2008		7th	
2011		3rd place, bronze medalist(s)	
2012		5th	
2013		2nd place, silver medalist(s)	
2014	8th		Emir Halimić
2015	1st place, gold medalist(s)		Josip Pandža
2016	14th		Dragan Mičić
2017		12th	
2018		2nd place, silver medalist(s)	
2019	16th		Admir Prašović
2022		6th	
2023		11th	
2024		18th	
2025		7th	Ahmet Pašalić
2026		4th	

== FIBA U17 World Cup ==
Year	Position	Head coach
(Germany) 2010	Did not qualify	N/A
(Lithuania) 2012	Did not qualify	N/A
(United Arab Emirates) 2014	Did not qualify	N/A
(Spain) 2016	9th	Josip Pandža
(Argentina) 2018	Did not qualify	N/A
(Bulgaria) 2020	Did not qualify	N/A
(Spain) 2022	Did not qualify	N/A
(Turkey) 2024	Did not qualify	N/A
(Turkey) 2026	Did not qualify	N/A
(Greece) 2028	To be determined	
Total	1/9	

== See also ==
- Bosnia and Herzegovina men's national basketball team
- Bosnia and Herzegovina men's national under-18 basketball team
- Bosnia and Herzegovina women's national under-16 and under-17 basketball team
