= 2018 FIBA U16 European Championship =

2018 EuroBasket Under-16
32nd FIBA Europe Under-16 Championship

Tournament details
- Host country: Serbia
- Dates: 10–18 August 2018
- Teams: 16
- Venue(s): SPC Vojvodina, Novi Sad (in 1 host city)

Final positions
- Champions: Croatia (4th title)

Tournament statistics
- MVP: (Croatia) Roko Prkačin
- Top scorer: Sasha Mattias Grant
- Top rebounds: Usman Garuba
- Top assists: Amit Aharoni
- PPG (Team): Italy
- RPG (Team): Spain
- APG (Team): Israel

Official website
- www.fiba.basketball

The 2018 FIBA U16 European Championship was the 32nd edition of the Under-16 European Basketball Championship. The competition took place from 10 to 18 August 2018 in Novi Sad, Serbia. Sixteen (16) teams are participating, including 2017 Division B top three finishers.

The defending champions were France.

== Participating teams ==
- Croatia
- Estonia
- France
- Georgia ▲ (3rd place at 2017 Division B)
- Germany
- Greece ▲ (1st place at 2017 Division B)
- Israel
- Italy
- Latvia
- Lithuania
- Montenegro
- Netherlands ▲ (2nd place at 2017 Division B)
- Serbia
- Slovenia
- Spain
- Turkey

== First round ==
In this round, sixteen teams are allocated in four groups of four teams each. All teams advance to the Playoffs.

=== Group A ===
Pos	Team	Pld	W	L	PF	PA	PD	Pts
1	Lithuania	3	3	0	281	151	+130	6
2	Israel	3	1	2	201	236	−35	4
3	Slovenia	3	1	2	222	267	−45	4
4	Montenegro	3	1	2	215	265	−50	4

Source: FIBA
Rules for classification: 1) Points; 2) Head-to-head results; 3) Points difference; 4) Points scored.

=== Group B ===
Pos	Team	Pld	W	L	PF	PA	PD	Pts
1	Spain	3	3	0	236	169	+67	6
2	Serbia	3	2	1	209	184	+25	5
3	Latvia	3	1	2	208	241	−33	4
4	Netherlands	3	0	3	173	232	−59	3

Source: FIBA
Rules for classification: 1) Points; 2) Head-to-head results; 3) Points difference; 4) Points scored.

=== Group C ===
Pos	Team	Pld	W	L	PF	PA	PD	Pts
1	Turkey	3	2	1	218	223	−5	5
2	Croatia	3	2	1	229	210	+19	5
3	Greece	3	1	2	214	230	−16	4
4	Germany	3	1	2	211	209	+2	4

Source: FIBA
Rules for classification: 1) Points; 2) Head-to-head results; 3) Points difference; 4) Points scored.

=== Group D ===
Pos	Team	Pld	W	L	PF	PA	PD	Pts
1	France	3	3	0	250	161	+89	6
2	Estonia	3	2	1	216	200	+16	5
3	Italy	3	1	2	211	216	−5	4
4	Georgia	3	0	3	175	275	−100	3

Source: FIBA
Rules for classification: 1) Points; 2) Head-to-head results; 3) Points difference; 4) Points scored.

== Final round ==
=== Bracket ===
Round of 16
14 August
Lithuania	84
Netherlands	53
14 August
Croatia	85
Italy	58
14 August
Serbia	88
Slovenia	63
14 August
France	83
Germany	56
14 August
Israel	81
Latvia	85
14 August
Turkey	97
Georgia	72
14 August
Spain	102
Montenegro	49
14 August
Estonia	66
Greece	83

Quarter-finals
15 August
Lithuania	78
Croatia	80
15 August
Serbia	71
France	78
15 August
Latvia	63
Turkey	92
15 August
Spain	61
Greece	41

Semi-finals
17 August
Croatia	65
France	58
17 August
Turkey	57
Spain	67

Final
18 August
Croatia	71
Spain	70
3rd place game
18 August
France	59
Turkey	82

5th–8th place bracket

5th–8th place semifinals
17 August
Lithuania	66
Serbia	73
17 August
Latvia	64
Greece	73

5th place game
18 August
Serbia	81
Greece	68
7th place game
18 August
Lithuania	82
Latvia	61

9th–16th place bracket

9th–16th place quarterfinals
15 August
Netherlands	45
Italy	80
15 August
Slovenia	82
Germany	84
15 August
Israel	72
Georgia	63
15 August
Montenegro	65
Estonia	78

9th–12th place semifinals
17 August
Italy	80
Germany	93
17 August
Israel	72
Estonia	71

9th place game
18 August
Germany	77
Israel	73
11th place game
18 August
Italy	70
Estonia	77

13th–16th place bracket

13th–16th place semifinals
17 August
Netherlands	62
Slovenia	77
17 August
Georgia	81
Montenegro	83

13th place game
18 August
Slovenia	80
Montenegro	71
15th place game
18 August
Netherlands	92
Georgia	90

== Final standings ==
Rank	Team	Record
1st place, gold medalist(s)	Croatia	6–1
2nd place, silver medalist(s)	Spain	6–1
3rd place, bronze medalist(s)	Turkey	5–2
4	France	5–2
5	Serbia	5–2
6	Greece	3–4
7	Lithuania	5–2
8	Latvia	2–5
9	Germany	4–3
10	Israel	3–4
11	Estonia	4–3
12	Italy	2–5
13	Slovenia	3–4
14	Montenegro	2–5
15	Netherlands	1–6
16	Georgia	0–7

Relegated to the 2019 FIBA U16 European Championship Division B

== Awards ==
Most Valuable Player
(Croatia) Roko Prkačin

All-Tournament Team

- (Spain) Héctor Alderete
- (Spain) Usman Garuba
- (Croatia) Boris Tišma
- (Turkey) Alperen Şengün
- (Croatia) Roko Prkačin
