= 2008 FIBA Europe Under-16 Championship =

2008 FIBA U16 European Championship
22nd FIBA Under-16 European Basketball Championship

Tournament details
- Host country: Italy
- Dates: 15–24 August 2008
- Teams: 16 (from 1 federation)
- Venue: (in 1 host city)

Final positions
- Champions: Lithuania (1st title)

Tournament statistics
- MVP: (Lithuania) Jonas Valančiūnas
- Top scorer: (Turkey) Kanter (22.9)
- Top rebounds: (Turkey) Kanter (16.5)
- Top assists: (France) Westermann (2.1)
- PPG (Team): Italy (80.3)
- RPG (Team): Lithuania (49.1)
- APG (Team): Greece (7.0)

Official website
- Official website (archive)

The 2008 FIBA Europe Under-16 Championship was the 22nd edition of the FIBA Europe Under-16 Championship. The city of Chieti, in Italy, hosted the tournament. Lithuania won the trophy for the first time. Hungary and Georgia were relegated to Division B.

== Teams ==
- Croatia
- Czech Republic
- France
- Georgia
- Greece
- Hungary
- Israel
- Italy
- Latvia
- Lithuania
- Poland
- Russia
- Serbia
- Spain
- Turkey
- Ukraine

== Preliminary round ==
Team advanced to Qualifying Round
Team competed in 13th–16th games

=== Group A ===
Team	Pld	W	L	PF	PA	Pts
Czech Republic	3	3	0	182	176	6
Serbia	3	2	1	199	192	5
Greece	3	1	2	211	216	4
Italy	3	0	3	191	202	3

=== Group B ===
Team	Pld	W	L	PF	PA	Pts
Lithuania	3	3	0	229	166	6
Spain	3	2	1	236	169	5
Ukraine	3	1	2	187	209	4
Hungary	3	0	3	145	253	3

=== Group C ===
Team	Pld	W	L	PF	PA	Pts
Turkey	3	2	1	216	186	5
Croatia	3	2	1	223	212	5
Latvia	3	1	2	212	227	4
Poland	3	1	2	170	196	4

=== Group D ===
Team	Pld	W	L	PF	PA	Pts
Russia	3	3	0	208	159	6
France	3	2	1	191	173	5
Israel	3	1	2	178	198	4
Georgia	3	0	3	162	209	3

== Classification round ==
Team relegated to Division B.

=== Group G ===
Team	Pld	W	L	PF	PA	Pts
Italy	3	3	0	291	177	6
Poland	3	2	1	242	214	5
Hungary	3	1	2	216	253	4
Georgia	3	0	3	166	271	3

== Qualifying round ==
Team advanced to Semifinals
Team competed in 5th–8th playoffs
Team competed in 9th–12th playoffs

=== Group E ===
Team	Pld	W	L	PF	PA	Pts
Lithuania	5	5	0	382	285	10
Czech Republic	5	4	1	310	302	9
Spain	5	3	2	317	300	8
Serbia	5	2	3	309	303	7
Greece	5	1	4	359	371	6
Ukraine	5	0	5	286	402	5

=== Group F ===
Team	Pld	W	L	PF	PA	Pts
Turkey	5	4	1	356	303	9
France	5	4	1	341	292	9
Russia	5	4	1	343	300	9
Croatia	5	2	3	341	357	7
Israel	5	1	4	305	366	6
Latvia	5	0	5	348	416	5

== Knockout stage ==
=== 9th–12th playoffs ===
Playoffs
Latvia	82
Greece	80
Israel	63
Ukraine	78

Ninth place
Latvia	68
Ukraine	73
Eleventh place
Greece	65
Israel	67

=== 5th–8th playoffs ===
Playoffs
Spain	62
Croatia	56
Russia	54
Serbia	63

Fifth place
Spain	56
Serbia	60
Seventh place
Croatia	83
Russia	77

=== Championship ===
Semifinals
France	47
Lithuania	73
Czech Republic	69
Turkey	64

Final
Lithuania	75
Czech Republic	33
Third place
France	65
Turkey	77

2008 FIBA Europe U-16 Championship

Lithuania
First title

== Final standings ==
Rank	Team
1st place, gold medalist(s)	Lithuania
2nd place, silver medalist(s)	Czech Republic
3rd place, bronze medalist(s)	Turkey
4th	France
5th	Serbia
6th	Spain
7th	Croatia
8th	Russia
9th	Ukraine
10th	Latvia
11th	Israel
12th	Greece
13th	Italy
14th	Poland
15th	Hungary
16th	Georgia

Relegated to the 2009 FIBA Europe Under-16 Championship Division B

== See also ==
- 2008 FIBA Europe Under-16 Championship Division C
