= 2012 FIBA Europe Under-16 Championship Division B =

Tournament details
- Host country: Romania
- City: Bucharest
- Dates: 19–29 July 2012
- Teams: 21 (from 1 confederation)
- Venue(s): 2 (in 1 host city)

Final positions
- Champions: Belgium (1st title)
- Runners-up: Montenegro
- Third place: Sweden

The 2012 FIBA U16 European Championship Division B was the 9th edition of the Division B of the European basketball championship for national under-16 teams. It was played from 19 to 29 July 2012 in Bucharest, Romania. Belgium men's national under-16 basketball team won the tournament.

== Participating teams ==
- Austria
- Belarus
- Belgium
- Bosnia and Herzegovina
- Bulgaria ▼ (15th place, 2011 FIBA Europe Under-16 Championship Division A)
- Denmark
- Estonia
- Finland
- Georgia
- Hungary
- Israel
- Luxembourg
- Macedonia
- Montenegro ▼ (16th place, 2011 FIBA Europe Under-16 Championship Division A)
- Netherlands
- Norway
- Portugal
- Romania
- Slovakia
- Sweden
- Switzerland

== First round ==
In the first round, the teams were drawn into four groups. The first two teams from each group advance to the quarterfinal groups; the third and fourth teams advance to the 9th–16th place classification groups; the other teams will play in the 17th–21st place classification groups.

=== Group A ===
Pos	Team	Pld	W	L	PF	PA	PD	Pts	Qualification
1	Sweden	4	4	0	295	229	+66	8	Quarterfinal groups
2	Israel	4	3	1	253	238	+15	7	Quarterfinal groups
3	Finland	4	2	2	279	271	+8	6	9th–16th place classification
4	Belarus	4	1	3	263	299	−36	5	9th–16th place classification
5	Luxembourg	4	0	4	259	312	−53	4	17th–21st place classification

Source: FIBA Archive

19 July 2012

Boxscore

Luxembourg	63–67	Belarus

Bucharest

19 July 2012

Boxscore

Sweden	67–57	Finland

Bucharest

20 July 2012

Boxscore

Israel	52–65	Sweden

Bucharest

20 July 2012

Boxscore

Finland	89–82	Luxembourg

Bucharest

21 July 2012

Boxscore

Belarus	69–81	Finland

Bucharest

21 July 2012

Boxscore

Luxembourg	65–71	Israel

Bucharest

22 July 2012

Boxscore

Sweden	85–49	Luxembourg

Bucharest

22 July 2012

Boxscore

Israel	77–56	Belarus

Bucharest

23 July 2012

Boxscore

Finland	52–53	Israel

Bucharest

23 July 2012

Boxscore

Belarus	71–78	Sweden

Bucharest

=== Group B ===
Pos	Team	Pld	W	L	PF	PA	PD	Pts	Qualification
1	Belgium	4	3	1	262	217	+45	7	Quarterfinal groups
2	Macedonia	4	3	1	283	233	+50	7	Quarterfinal groups
3	Denmark	4	2	2	239	243	−4	6	9th–16th place classification
4	Bulgaria	4	1	3	243	289	−46	5	9th–16th place classification
5	Slovakia	4	1	3	235	280	−45	5	17th–21st place classification

Source: FIBA Archive

19 July 2012

Boxscore

Slovakia	47–84	Macedonia

Bucharest

19 July 2012

Boxscore

Belgium	61–66	Denmark

Bucharest

20 July 2012

Boxscore

Bulgaria	43–75	Belgium

Bucharest

20 July 2012

Boxscore

Denmark	61–64	Slovakia

Bucharest

21 July 2012

Boxscore

Macedonia	61–52	Denmark

Bucharest

21 July 2012

Boxscore

Slovakia	65–68	Bulgaria

Bucharest

22 July 2012

Boxscore

Belgium	67–59	Slovakia

Bucharest

22 July 2012

Boxscore

Bulgaria	75–89	Macedonia

Bucharest

23 July 2012

Boxscore

Denmark	60–57	Bulgaria

Bucharest

23 July 2012

Boxscore

Macedonia	49–59	Belgium

Bucharest

=== Group C ===
Pos	Team	Pld	W	L	PF	PA	PD	Pts	Qualification
1	Montenegro	4	4	0	315	224	+91	8	Quarterfinal groups
2	Bosnia and Herzegovina	4	2	2	317	294	+23	6	Quarterfinal groups
3	Georgia	4	2	2	214	258	−44	6	9th–16th place classification
4	Romania	4	1	3	229	249	−20	5	9th–16th place classification
5	Estonia	4	1	3	233	283	−50	5	17th–21st place classification

Source: FIBA Archive

19 July 2012

Boxscore

Bosnia and Herzegovina	82–83	Estonia

Bucharest

19 July 2012

Boxscore

Romania	51–55	Georgia

Bucharest

20 July 2012

Boxscore

Montenegro	66–53	Romania

Bucharest

20 July 2012

Boxscore

Georgia	52–82	Bosnia and Herzegovina

Bucharest

21 July 2012

Boxscore

Estonia	52–59	Georgia

Bucharest

21 July 2012

Boxscore

Bosnia and Herzegovina	78–93	Montenegro

Bucharest

22 July 2012

Boxscore

Romania	66–75	Bosnia and Herzegovina

Bucharest

22 July 2012

Boxscore

Montenegro	83–45	Estonia

Bucharest

23 July 2012

Boxscore

Georgia	48–73	Montenegro

Bucharest

23 July 2012

Boxscore

Estonia	53–59	Romania

Bucharest

=== Group D ===
Pos	Team	Pld	W	L	PF	PA	PD	Pts	Qualification
1	Portugal	5	5	0	279	205	+74	10	Quarterfinal groups
2	Hungary	5	4	1	363	263	+100	9	Quarterfinal groups
3	Switzerland	5	3	2	277	292	−15	8	9th–16th place classification
4	Netherlands	5	2	3	262	257	+5	7	9th–16th place classification
5	Norway	5	1	4	220	322	−102	6	17th–21st place classification
6	Austria	5	0	5	251	313	−62	5	17th–21st place classification

Source: FIBA Archive

19 July 2012

Boxscore

Norway	41–90	Hungary

Bucharest

19 July 2012

Boxscore

Austria	57–72	Switzerland

Bucharest

19 July 2012

Boxscore

Netherlands	40–48	Portugal

Bucharest

20 July 2012

Boxscore

Hungary	88–57	Austria

Bucharest

20 July 2012

Boxscore

Portugal	52–33	Norway

Bucharest

20 July 2012

Boxscore

Switzerland	66–55	Netherlands

Bucharest

21 July 2012

Boxscore

Portugal	64–54	Hungary

Bucharest

21 July 2012

Boxscore

Netherlands	48–36	Austria

Bucharest

21 July 2012

Boxscore

Norway	43–55	Switzerland

Bucharest

22 July 2012

Boxscore

Hungary	66–55	Netherlands

Bucharest

22 July 2012

Boxscore

Switzerland	38–72	Portugal

Bucharest

22 July 2012

Boxscore

Austria	61–62	Norway

Bucharest

23 July 2012

Boxscore

Switzerland	46–65	Hungary

Bucharest

23 July 2012

Boxscore

Norway	41–64	Netherlands

Bucharest

23 July 2012

Boxscore

Portugal	43–40	Austria

Bucharest

== 17th–21st place classification ==
=== Group I ===
Pos	Team	Pld	W	L	PF	PA	PD	Pts	Qualification
1	Luxembourg	1	1	0	99	70	+29	2	17th place match
2	Slovakia	1	0	1	70	99	−29	1	19th place match

Source: FIBA Archive

25 July 2012

Boxscore

Luxembourg	99–70	Slovakia

Bucharest

=== Group J ===
Pos	Team	Pld	W	L	PF	PA	PD	Pts	Qualification
1	Estonia	2	2	0	123	95	+28	4	17th place match
2	Norway	2	1	1	106	124	−18	3	19th place match
3	Austria	2	0	2	112	122	−10	2	

Source: FIBA Archive

25 July 2012

Boxscore

Austria	51–60	Estonia

Bucharest

26 July 2012

Boxscore

Estonia	63–44	Norway

Bucharest

=== 17th–20th place playoffs ===
==== 19th place match ====
29 July 2012

Boxscore

Slovakia	84–45	Norway

Bucharest

==== 17th place match ====
29 July 2012

Boxscore

Luxembourg	73–102	Estonia

Bucharest

== 9th–16th place classification ==
=== Group G ===
Pos	Team	Pld	W	L	PF	PA	PD	Pts	Qualification
1	Belarus	3	2	1	234	224	+10	5	9th–12th place playoffs
2	Finland	3	2	1	229	198	+31	5	9th–12th place playoffs
3	Denmark	3	2	1	210	211	−1	5	13th–16th place playoffs
4	Bulgaria	3	0	3	179	219	−40	3	13th–16th place playoffs

Source: FIBA Archive

25 July 2012

Boxscore

Finland	83–50	Bulgaria

Bucharest

25 July 2012

Boxscore

Belarus	89–71	Denmark

Bucharest

26 July 2012

Boxscore

Denmark	79–65	Finland

Bucharest

26 July 2012

Boxscore

Bulgaria	72–76	Belarus

Bucharest

=== Group H ===
Pos	Team	Pld	W	L	PF	PA	PD	Pts	Qualification
1	Netherlands	3	2	1	187	171	+16	5	9th–12th place playoffs
2	Georgia	3	2	1	177	179	−2	5	9th–12th place playoffs
3	Romania	3	1	2	193	179	+14	4	13th–16th place playoffs
4	Switzerland	3	1	2	186	214	−28	4	13th–16th place playoffs

Source: FIBA Archive

25 July 2012

Boxscore

Georgia	53–76	Netherlands

Bucharest

25 July 2012

Boxscore

Romania	90–68	Switzerland

Bucharest

26 July 2012

Boxscore

Switzerland	52–69	Georgia

Bucharest

26 July 2012

Boxscore

Netherlands	56–52	Romania

Bucharest

=== 13th–16th place playoffs ===
13th–16th place semifinals
G3	Denmark	95
H4	Switzerland	49
H3	Romania	76
G4	Bulgaria	70

13th place match
G3	Denmark	91
H3	Romania	67
15th place match
H4	Switzerland	62
G4	Bulgaria	63

==== 13th–16th place semifinals ====
28 July 2012

Boxscore

Denmark	95–49	Switzerland

Bucharest

28 July 2012

Boxscore

Romania	76–70	Bulgaria

Bucharest

==== 15th place match ====
29 July 2012

Boxscore

Switzerland	62–63	Bulgaria

Bucharest

==== 13th place match ====
29 July 2012

Boxscore

Denmark	91–67	Romania

Bucharest

=== 9th–12th place playoffs ===
9th–12th place semifinals
G1	Belarus	74
H2	Georgia	66
H1	Netherlands	76
G2	Finland	59

9th place match
G1	Belarus	63
H1	Netherlands	71
11th place match
H2	Georgia	48
G2	Finland	89

==== 9th–12th place semifinals ====
28 July 2012

Boxscore

Belarus	74–66	Georgia

Bucharest

28 July 2012

Boxscore

Netherlands	76–59	Finland

Bucharest

==== 11th place match ====
29 July 2012

Boxscore

Georgia	48–89	Finland

Bucharest

==== 9th place match ====
29 July 2012

Boxscore

Belarus	63–71	Netherlands

Bucharest

== 1st–8th place classification ==
=== Group E ===
Pos	Team	Pld	W	L	PF	PA	PD	Pts	Qualification
1	Sweden	3	2	1	194	178	+16	5	Semifinals
2	Belgium	3	2	1	178	173	+5	5	Semifinals
3	Israel	3	1	2	187	194	−7	4	5th–8th place playoffs
4	Macedonia	3	1	2	185	199	−14	4	5th–8th place playoffs

Source: FIBA Archive

25 July 2012

Boxscore

Sweden	64–67	Macedonia

Bucharest

25 July 2012

Boxscore

Israel	59–60	Belgium

Bucharest

26 July 2012

Boxscore

Belgium	59–65	Sweden

Bucharest

26 July 2012

Boxscore

Macedonia	69–76	Israel

Bucharest

=== Group F ===
Pos	Team	Pld	W	L	PF	PA	PD	Pts	Qualification
1	Hungary	3	2	1	171	158	+13	5	Semifinals
2	Montenegro	3	2	1	225	183	+42	5	Semifinals
3	Bosnia and Herzegovina	3	1	2	199	208	−9	4	5th–8th place playoffs
4	Portugal	3	1	2	167	213	−46	4	5th–8th place playoffs

Source: FIBA Archive

25 July 2012

Boxscore

Montenegro	42–54	Hungary

Bucharest

25 July 2012

Boxscore

Bosnia and Herzegovina	69–52	Portugal

Bucharest

26 July 2012

Boxscore

Portugal	51–90	Montenegro

Bucharest

26 July 2012

Boxscore

Hungary	63–52	Bosnia and Herzegovina

Bucharest

=== 5th–8th place playoffs ===
5th–8th place semifinals
E3	Israel	73
F4	Portugal	64
F3	Bosnia and Herzegovina	79
E4	Macedonia	69

5th place match
E3	Israel	65
F3	Bosnia and Herzegovina	71
7th place match
F4	Portugal	56
E4	Macedonia	70

==== 5th–8th place semifinals ====
28 July 2012

Boxscore

Israel	73–64	Portugal

Bucharest

28 July 2012

Boxscore

Bosnia and Herzegovina	79–69	Macedonia

Bucharest

==== 7th place match ====
29 July 2012

Boxscore

Portugal	56–70	Macedonia

Bucharest

==== 5th place match ====
29 July 2012

Boxscore

Israel	65–71	Bosnia and Herzegovina

Bucharest

=== Championship playoffs ===
Semifinals
E1	Sweden	66
F2	Montenegro	71
F1	Hungary	48
E2	Belgium	50

Final
F2	Montenegro	46
E2	Belgium	56
3rd place match
E1	Sweden	79
F1	Hungary	55

==== Semifinals ====
28 July 2012

Boxscore

Sweden	66–71	Montenegro

Bucharest

28 July 2012

Boxscore

Hungary	48–50	Belgium

Bucharest

==== 3rd place match ====
29 July 2012

Boxscore

Sweden	79–55	Hungary

Bucharest

==== Final ====
29 July 2012

Boxscore

Montenegro	46–56	Belgium

Bucharest

== Final standings ==
Rank	Team
1st place, gold medalist(s)	Belgium
2nd place, silver medalist(s)	Montenegro
3rd place, bronze medalist(s)	Sweden
4	Hungary
5	Bosnia and Herzegovina
6	Israel
7	Macedonia
8	Portugal
9	Netherlands
10	Belarus
11	Finland
12	Georgia
13	Denmark
14	Romania
15	Bulgaria
16	Switzerland
17	Estonia
18	Luxembourg
19	Slovakia
20	Norway
21	Austria

Promoted to the 2013 FIBA Europe Under-16 Championship Division A
