= Czech Republic men's national under-16 and under-17 basketball team =

Czech Republic
- FIBA zone: FIBA Europe
- National federation: Czech Basketball Federation

U17 World Cup
- Appearances: 1
- Medals: None

U16 EuroBasket
- Appearances: 8
- Medals: Silver: 2 (2008, 2011)

U16 EuroBasket Division B
- Appearances: 15
- Medals: Gold: 2 (2006, 2010); Bronze: 1 (2025)
Home	Away

The Czech Republic men's national under-16 and under-17 basketball team is a national basketball team of the Czech Republic, administered by the Czech Basketball Federation. It represents the country in international under-16 and under-17 men's basketball competitions.

== FIBA U16 EuroBasket participations ==
Year	Division A	Division B
1993	12th	
1995	11th	
2004		7th/8th
2005		13th
2006		1st place, gold medalist(s)
2007	13th	
2008	2nd place, silver medalist(s)	
2009	16th	
2010		1st place, gold medalist(s)
2011	2nd place, silver medalist(s)	
2012	15th	
2013		5th

Year	Division A	Division B
2014		4th
2015		16th
2016		8th
2017		8th
2018		4th
2019		7th
2022		16th
2023		8th
2024		15th
2025		3rd place, bronze medalist(s)
2026	11th	

== FIBA Under-17 Basketball World Cup participations ==
Year	Result
2012	8th

== See also ==
- Czech Republic men's national basketball team
- Czech Republic men's national under-18 basketball team
- Czech Republic women's national under-17 basketball team
