= Netherlands men's national under-16 basketball team =

Netherlands
- FIBA zone: FIBA Europe
- National federation: Basketball Nederland
- Coach: Radenko Varagić
- Nickname: Orange Lions

U17 World Cup
- Appearances: None

U16 EuroBasket
- Appearances: 4
- Medals: None

U16 EuroBasket Division B
- Appearances: 19
- Medals: Silver: 2 (2017, 2019)
Home	Away

The Netherlands men's national under-16 basketball team is a national basketball team of the Netherlands, administered by Basketball Nederland. It represents the country in international under-16 men's basketball competitions.

== FIBA U16 EuroBasket participations ==
Year	Division A	Division B
1975	6th	
1983	8th	
2004		9th/10th
2005		18th
2006		13th
2007		7th
2008		17th
2009		15th
2010		4th
2011		7th
2012		9th
2013		12th

Year	Division A	Division B
2014		11th
2015		8th
2016		11th
2017		2nd place, silver medalist(s)
2018	15th	
2019		2nd place, silver medalist(s)
2022	15th	
2023		17th
2024		7th
2025		18th
2026		5th

== See also ==
- Netherlands men's national basketball team
- Netherlands men's national under-18 basketball team
- Netherlands women's national under-17 basketball team
