= Bulgaria men's national under-16 basketball team =

National sports team

Bulgaria
- FIBA zone: FIBA Europe
- National federation: Bulgarian Basketball Federation
- Nickname: Лъвовете (The Lions)

U17 World Cup
- Appearances: None

U16 EuroBasket
- Appearances: 10
- Medals: None

U16 EuroBasket Division B
- Appearances: 18
- Medals: Gold: 1 (2009); Silver: 1 (2023); Bronze: 2 (2006, 2008)
| Home | Away |

The Bulgaria men's national under-16 basketball team is a national basketball team of Bulgaria, administered by the Bulgarian Basketball Federation. It represents the country in international under-16 men's basketball competitions.

== FIBA U16 EuroBasket participations ==
| Year | Division A | Division B |
|---|---|---|
| 1975 | 10th | |
| 1977 | 12th | |
| 1979 | 6th | |
| 1985 | 6th | |
| 1989 | 10th | |
| 1991 | 9th | |
| 2003 | 12th | |
| 2004 | | 5th/6th |
| 2005 | | 8th |
| 2006 | | 3rd place, bronze medalist(s) |
| 2007 | | 17th |
| 2008 | | 3rd place, bronze medalist(s) |
| 2009 | | 1st place, gold medalist(s) |
| 2010 | 12th | |

| Year | Division A | Division B |
|---|---|---|
| 2011 | 15th | |
| 2012 | | 15th |
| 2013 | | 19th |
| 2014 | | 12th |
| 2015 | | 9th |
| 2016 | | 17th |
| 2017 | | 14th |
| 2018 | | 11th |
| 2019 | | 6th |
| 2022 | | 4th |
| 2023 | | 2nd place, silver medalist(s) |
| 2024 | 15th | |
| 2025 | | 14th |
| 2026 | | 13th |

== See also ==
- Bulgaria men's national basketball team
- Bulgaria men's national under-18 basketball team
- Bulgaria women's national under-16 basketball team
