= North Macedonia men's national under-16 basketball team =

Youth national basketball team of North Macedonia

North Macedonia
- FIBA zone: FIBA Europe
- National federation: Basketball Federation of North Macedonia

U17 World Cup
- Appearances: None

U16 EuroBasket
- Appearances: 7
- Medals: None

U16 EuroBasket Division B
- Appearances: 15
- Medals: Bronze: 2 (2004, 2018)
Home	Away

The North Macedonia men's national under-16 basketball team is a national basketball team of North Macedonia, administered by the Basketball Federation of North Macedonia. It represents the country in international under-16 men's basketball competitions.

== FIBA U16 EuroBasket participations ==
Year	Division A	Division B
1995	4th	
1997	10th	
1999	6th	
2003	7th	
2004		4th
2005		13th
2007		20th
2008		15th
2011		19th
2012		7th
2013		8th

Year	Division A	Division B
2014		9th
2015		22nd
2016		16th
2017		15th
2018		3rd place, bronze medalist(s)
2019	12th	
2022	12th	
2023	16th	
2024		10th
2025		16th
2026		14th

== See also ==
- North Macedonia men's national basketball team
- North Macedonia men's national under-18 basketball team
- North Macedonia women's national under-16 basketball team
