= Belgium men's national under-16 basketball team =

Belgium
- FIBA zone: FIBA Europe
- National federation: Basketball Belgium

U17 World Cup
- Appearances: None

U16 EuroBasket
- Appearances: 14
- Medals: None

U16 EuroBasket Division B
- Appearances: 16
- Medals: Gold: 1 (2012); Silver: 1 (2025); Bronze: 1 (2022)
Home	Away

The Belgium men's national under-16 basketball team is a national basketball team of Belgium, administered by the Basketball Belgium. It represents the country in international under-16 men's basketball competitions.

== FIBA U16 EuroBasket participations ==
Year	Division A	Division B
1973	10th	
1975	7th	
1977	7th	
1979	8th	
1985	9th	
1987	11th	
1989	12th	
1991	11th	
1997	12th	
2004	12th	
2005	16th	
2006		10th
2007		9th
2008		9th
2009		9th

Year	Division A	Division B
2010		13th
2011		10th
2012		1st place, gold medalist(s)
2013	14th	
2014		5th
2015		6th
2016		7th
2017		6th
2018		9th
2019		5th
2022		3rd place, bronze medalist(s)
2023	15th	
2024		4th
2025		2nd place, silver medalist(s)
2026	14th	

== See also ==
- Belgium men's national basketball team
- Belgium men's national under-18 basketball team
- Belgium women's national under-17 basketball team
