= Portugal men's national under-16 basketball team =

Portugal
- FIBA zone: FIBA Europe
- National federation: Portuguese Basketball Federation

U17 World Cup
- Appearances: None

U16 EuroBasket
- Appearances: 5
- Medals: None

U16 EuroBasket Division B
- Appearances: 19
- Medals: Silver: 1 (2005)
Home	Away

The Portugal men's national under-16 basketball team is a national basketball team of Portugal, administered by the Portuguese Basketball Federation. It represents the country in international under-16 men's basketball competitions.

== FIBA U16 EuroBasket participations ==
Year	Division A	Division B
1973	14th	
1975	13th	
1995	9th	
2004		7th/8th
2005		2nd place, silver medalist(s)
2006	14th	
2007	16th	
2008		16th
2009		13th
2010		10th
2011		9th
2012		8th

Year	Division A	Division B
2013		15th
2014		20th
2015		12th
2016		9th
2017		16th
2018		14th
2019		11th
2022		9th
2023		13th
2024		11th
2025		4th
2026		18th

== See also ==
- Portugal men's national basketball team
- Portugal men's national under-18 and under-19 basketball team
- Portugal women's national under-17 basketball team
