= Hungary men's national under-16 basketball team =

Youth basketball team representing Hungary

Hungary
- FIBA zone: FIBA Europe
- National federation: Hungarian Basketball Federation

U17 World Cup
- Appearances: None

U16 EuroBasket
- Appearances: 3
- Medals: None

U16 EuroBasket Division B
- Appearances: 20
- Medals: Silver: 1 (2007)

The Hungary men's national under-16 basketball team is a national basketball team of Hungary, administered by the Hungarian Basketball Federation. It represents the country in international under-16 men's basketball competitions.

== FIBA U16 EuroBasket participations ==
Year	Division A	Division B
1983	11th	
1987	12th	
2004		11th/12th
2005		10th
2006		11th
2007		2nd place, silver medalist(s)
2008	15th	
2009		7th
2010		6th
2011		5th
2012		4th
2013		13th

Year	Division A	Division B
2014		7th
2015		13th
2016		13th
2017		7th
2018		17th
2019		14th
2022		13th
2023		5th
2024		9th
2025		13th
2026		15th

== See also ==
- Hungary men's national basketball team
- Hungary men's national under-18 basketball team
- Hungary women's national under-17 basketball team
