= Romania men's national under-16 basketball team =

Romania
- FIBA zone: FIBA Europe
- National federation: Federatia Română de Baschet

U17 World Cup
- Appearances: None

U16 EuroBasket
- Appearances: 3
- Medals: None

U16 EuroBasket Division B
- Appearances: 19
- Medals: Silver: 1 (2024)
Home	Away

The Romania men's national under-16 basketball team is a national basketball team of Romania, administered by the Romanian Basketball Federation. It represents the country in international under-16 men's basketball competitions.

== FIBA U16 EuroBasket participations ==
Year	Division A	Division B
1987	8th	
2004		9th/10th
2005		12th
2006		18th
2007		19th
2008		19th
2009		8th
2010		17th
2011		8th
2012		14th
2013		10th

Year	Division A	Division B
2014		15th
2015		17th
2016		15th
2017		21st
2018		8th
2019		8th
2022		15th
2023		4th
2024		2nd place, silver medalist(s)
2025	12th	
2026	8th	

== See also ==
- Romania men's national basketball team
- Romania men's national under-19 basketball team
- Romania women's national under-16 basketball team
