= Poland men's national under-16 and under-17 basketball team =

Poland
- FIBA zone: FIBA Europe
- National federation: Polish Basketball Federation
- Coach: Wojciech Bychawski

U17 World Cup
- Appearances: 2
- Medals: Silver: 1 (2010)

U16 EuroBasket
- Appearances: 21
- Medals: None

U16 EuroBasket Division B
- Appearances: 7
- Medals: Gold: 3 (2007, 2019, 2025); Silver: 1 (2015)

The Poland men's national under-16 and under-17 basketball team is a national basketball team of Poland, administered by the Polish Basketball Federation. It represents the country in international under-16 and under-17 men's basketball competitions.

== FIBA U16 EuroBasket participations ==
Year	Division A	Division B
1973	9th	
1975	14th	
1977	9th	
1981	11th	
1989	11th	
1993	11th	
1999	10th	
2004	14th	
2005	15th	
2006		7th
2007		1st place, gold medalist(s)
2008	14th	
2009	4th	
2010	11th	

Year	Division A	Division B
2011	14th	
2012	6th	
2013	12th	
2014	15th	
2015		2nd place, silver medalist(s)
2016	15th	
2017		10th
2018		5th
2019		1st place, gold medalist(s)
2022	11th	
2023	9th	
2024	14th	
2025		1st place, gold medalist(s)
2026	7th	

== FIBA U17 World Cup record ==
Year	Pos.	Pld	W	L
(Germany) 2010	2nd	8	7	1
(Lithuania) 2012	Did not qualify			
(United Arab Emirates) 2014	Did not qualify			
(Spain) 2016	Did not qualify			
(Argentina) 2018	Did not qualify			
(Spain) 2022	8th	7	3	4
(Turkey) 2024	Did not qualify			
(Turkey) 2026	Did not qualify			
(Greece) 2028	To be determined			
Total	2/9	15	10	5

== See also ==
- Poland men's national basketball team
- Poland men's national under-19 basketball team
- Poland women's national under-17 basketball team
