= 2017 FIBA U16 European Championship Division C =

Tournament details
- Host country: Andorra
- City: Andorra la Vella
- Dates: 23–30 July 2017
- Teams: 10 (from 1 confederation)
- Venue: 1 (in 1 host city)

Final positions
- Champions: Armenia (1st title)
- Runners-up: Gibraltar
- Third place: Azerbaijan

Official website
- www.fiba.basketball

The 2017 FIBA U16 European Championship Division C was the 13th edition of the Division C of the FIBA U16 European Championship, the third tier of the European men's under-16 basketball championship. It was played in Andorra la Vella, Andorra, from 23 to 30 July 2017. Ten teams participated in the competition. Armenia men's national under-16 basketball team won the tournament.

== Participating teams ==
- Albania
- Andorra (hosts)
- Armenia
- Azerbaijan
- Gibraltar
- Malta
- Moldova
- Monaco
- San Marino
- Wales

== First round ==
=== Group A ===
Pos	Team	Pld	W	L	PF	PA	PD	Pts	Qualification
1	Armenia	4	4	0	308	197	+111	8	Semifinals
2	Gibraltar	4	3	1	309	254	+55	7	Semifinals
3	Moldova	4	2	2	230	284	−54	6	5th–8th place playoffs
4	Wales	4	1	3	221	273	−52	5	5th–8th place playoffs
5	Malta	4	0	4	224	284	−60	4	9th place match

Source: FIBA

23 July 2017

Boxscore

Gibraltar	59–66	Armenia

Poliesportiu Sports Hall

23 July 2017

Boxscore

Wales	55–64	Moldova

Poliesportiu Sports Hall

24 July 2017

Boxscore

Malta	43–47	Wales

Poliesportiu Sports Hall

24 July 2017

Boxscore

Moldova	55–85	Gibraltar

Poliesportiu Sports Hall

25 July 2017

Boxscore

Armenia	78–37	Moldova

Poliesportiu Sports Hall

25 July 2017

Boxscore

Gibraltar	84–67	Malta

Poliesportiu Sports Hall

26 July 2017

Boxscore

Malta	48–79	Armenia

Poliesportiu Sports Hall

26 July 2017

Boxscore

Wales	66–81	Gibraltar

Poliesportiu Sports Hall

27 July 2017

Boxscore

Moldova	74–66	Malta

Poliesportiu Sports Hall

27 July 2017

Boxscore

Armenia	85–53	Wales

Poliesportiu Sports Hall

=== Group B ===
Pos	Team	Pld	W	L	PF	PA	PD	Pts	Qualification
1	Andorra	4	3	1	236	237	−1	7	Semifinals
2	Azerbaijan	4	3	1	308	258	+50	7	Semifinals
3	Albania	4	2	2	254	262	−8	6	5th–8th place playoffs
4	Monaco	4	2	2	266	256	+10	6	5th–8th place playoffs
5	San Marino	4	0	4	246	297	−51	4	9th place match

Source: FIBA

23 July 2017

Boxscore

Azerbaijan	74–63	Monaco

Poliesportiu Sports Hall

23 July 2017

Boxscore

Andorra	55–52	Albania

Poliesportiu Sports Hall

24 July 2017

Boxscore

Albania	66–78	Azerbaijan

Poliesportiu Sports Hall

24 July 2017

Boxscore

San Marino	61–62	Andorra

Poliesportiu Sports Hall

25 July 2017

Boxscore

Monaco	66–70	Albania

Poliesportiu Sports Hall

25 July 2017

Boxscore

Azerbaijan	90–62	San Marino

Poliesportiu Sports Hall

26 July 2017

Boxscore

San Marino	60–79	Monaco

Poliesportiu Sports Hall

26 July 2017

Boxscore

Andorra	67–66	Azerbaijan

Poliesportiu Sports Hall

27 July 2017

Boxscore

Albania	66–63	San Marino

Poliesportiu Sports Hall

27 July 2017

Boxscore

Monaco	58–52	Andorra

Poliesportiu Sports Hall

== 9th place match ==
30 July 2017

Boxscore

Malta	65–69	San Marino

Poliesportiu Sports Hall

== 5th–8th place playoffs ==
5th–8th place semifinals
29 July
Moldova	59
Monaco	98
29 July
Albania	58
Wales	47

5th place match
30 July
Monaco	79
Albania	71
7th place match
30 July
Moldova	60
Wales	65

=== 5th–8th place semifinals ===
29 July 2017

Boxscore

Moldova	59–98	Monaco

Poliesportiu Sports Hall

29 July 2017

Boxscore

Albania	58–47	Wales

Poliesportiu Sports Hall

=== 7th place match ===
30 July 2017

Boxscore

Moldova	60–65	Wales

Poliesportiu Sports Hall

=== 5th place match ===
30 July 2017

Boxscore

Monaco	79–71	Albania

Poliesportiu Sports Hall

== Championship playoffs ==
Semifinals
29 July
Armenia	88
Azerbaijan	76
29 July
Andorra	56
Gibraltar	61

Final
30 July
Armenia	88
Gibraltar	70
3rd place match
30 July
Azerbaijan	75
Andorra	55

=== Semifinals ===
29 July 2017

Boxscore

Armenia	88–76	Azerbaijan

Poliesportiu Sports Hall

29 July 2017

Boxscore

Andorra	56–61	Gibraltar

Poliesportiu Sports Hall

=== 3rd place match ===
30 July 2017

Boxscore

Azerbaijan	75–55	Andorra

Poliesportiu Sports Hall

=== Final ===
30 July 2017

Boxscore

Armenia	88–70	Gibraltar

Poliesportiu Sports Hall

== Final standings ==
Rank	Team
1st place, gold medalist(s)	Armenia
2nd place, silver medalist(s)	Gibraltar
3rd place, bronze medalist(s)	Azerbaijan
4	Andorra
5	Monaco
6	Albania
7	Wales
8	Moldova
9	San Marino
10	Malta
