= 2023 FIBA U16 European Championship Division C =

Tournament details
- Host country: Kosovo
- City: Pristina
- Dates: 19–27 July 2023
- Teams: 9 (from 1 confederation)
- Venue: 1 (in 1 host city)

Final positions
- Champions: Cyprus (4th title)
- Runners-up: Azerbaijan
- Third place: Andorra

Official website
- www.fiba.basketball/history

The 2023 FIBA U16 European Championship Division C was the 17th edition of the Division C of the FIBA U16 European Championship, the third tier of the European under-16 basketball championship. It was played from 19 to 27 July 2023 in Pristina, Kosovo. Cyprus men's national under-16 basketball team won the tournament.

== Participating teams ==
- Albania
- Andorra
- Armenia
- Azerbaijan
- Cyprus ▼ (22nd place, 2022 FIBA U16 European Championship Division B)
- Gibraltar
- Kosovo
- Malta
- San Marino

== First round ==
The draw of the first round was held on 14 February 2023 in Freising, Germany.

In the first round, the teams were drawn into two groups. The first two teams from each group advance to the semifinals; the other teams will play in the 5th–9th place classification group.

All times are local (Central European Summer Time – UTC+2).

=== Group A ===
Pos	Team	Pld	W	L	PF	PA	PD	Pts	Qualification
1	Kosovo (H)	3	3	0	323	199	+124	6	Semifinals
2	Andorra	3	2	1	313	204	+109	5	Semifinals
3	Malta	3	1	2	167	249	−82	4	5th−9th place classification
4	Gibraltar	3	0	3	154	305	−151	3	5th−9th place classification

Source: FIBA
(H) Hosts

19 July 2023
12:30

Boxscore

Andorra	125–50	Gibraltar
Scoring by quarter: 28–14, 24–15, 38–12, 35–9

1 Tetori Sports Hall

19 July 2023
17:30

Boxscore

Kosovo	103–53	Malta
Scoring by quarter: 24–6, 23–15, 31–18, 25–14

1 Tetori Sports Hall

21 July 2023
12:30

Boxscore

Malta	57–98	Andorra
Scoring by quarter: 12–27, 14–25, 10–25, 21–21

1 Tetori Sports Hall

21 July 2023
20:00

Boxscore

Gibraltar	56–123	Kosovo
Scoring by quarter: 7–22, 18–31, 10–32, 21–38

1 Tetori Sports Hall

24 July 2023
12:30

Boxscore

Malta	57–48	Gibraltar
Scoring by quarter: 12–5, 15–17, 14–15, 16–11

1 Tetori Sports Hall

24 July 2023
20:00

Boxscore

Andorra	90–97	Kosovo
Scoring by quarter: 20–20, 25–26, 27–36, 18–15

1 Tetori Sports Hall

=== Group B ===
Pos	Team	Pld	W	L	PF	PA	PD	Pts	Qualification
1	Azerbaijan	4	3	1	326	237	+89	7	Semifinals
2	Cyprus	4	3	1	356	219	+137	7	Semifinals
3	Armenia	4	3	1	323	258	+65	7	5th−9th place classification
4	Albania	4	1	3	250	351	−101	5	5th−9th place classification
5	San Marino	4	0	4	199	389	−190	4	5th−9th place classification

Source: FIBA

19 July 2023
15:00

Boxscore

Cyprus	65–51	Azerbaijan
Scoring by quarter: 21–14, 25–12, 7–16, 12–9

1 Tetori Sports Hall

19 July 2023
20:00

Boxscore

San Marino	44–102	Armenia
Scoring by quarter: 13–34, 9–24, 10–23, 12–21

1 Tetori Sports Hall

20 July 2023
15:00

Boxscore

Albania	73–67	San Marino
Scoring by quarter: 19–18, 15–16, 22–16, 17–17

1 Tetori Sports Hall

20 July 2023
17:30

Boxscore

Armenia	76–63	Cyprus
Scoring by quarter: 22–20, 14–15, 21–11, 19–17

1 Tetori Sports Hall

21 July 2023
15:00

Boxscore

Azerbaijan	92–58	Armenia
Scoring by quarter: 18–15, 17–15, 34–18, 23–10

1 Tetori Sports Hall

21 July 2023
17:30

Boxscore

Cyprus	110–51	Albania
Scoring by quarter: 26–15, 25–12, 28–8, 31–16

1 Tetori Sports Hall

23 July 2023
15:00

Boxscore

San Marino	41–118	Cyprus
Scoring by quarter: 14–27, 13–23, 2–38, 12–30

1 Tetori Sports Hall

23 July 2023
17:30

Boxscore

Albania	67–87	Azerbaijan
Scoring by quarter: 13–31, 9–15, 15–20, 30–21

1 Tetori Sports Hall

24 July 2023
15:00

Boxscore

Armenia	87–59	Albania
Scoring by quarter: 20–7, 24–16, 22–21, 21–15

1 Tetori Sports Hall

24 July 2023
17:30

Boxscore

Azerbaijan	96–47	San Marino
Scoring by quarter: 35–11, 16–15, 28–18, 17–3

1 Tetori Sports Hall

== 5th−9th place classification ==
=== Group C ===
Pos	Team	Pld	W	L	PF	PA	PD	Pts
5	Armenia	4	4	0	357	191	+166	8
6	Albania	4	3	1	297	251	+46	7
7	Malta	4	2	2	199	288	−89	6
8	San Marino	4	1	3	227	282	−55	5
9	Gibraltar	4	0	4	198	266	−68	4

Source: FIBA

25 July 2023
15:00

Boxscore

Albania	69–50	Gibraltar
Scoring by quarter: 13–14, 21–14, 9–11, 26–11

1 Tetori Sports Hall

25 July 2023
17:30

Boxscore

Malta	59–51	San Marino
Scoring by quarter: 15–15, 15–17, 14–12, 15–7

1 Tetori Sports Hall

26 July 2023
12:30

Boxscore

Armenia	93–36	Malta
Scoring by quarter: 31–11, 20–9, 24–12, 18–4

1 Tetori Sports Hall

26 July 2023
15:00

Boxscore

Gibraltar	48–65	San Marino
Scoring by quarter: 12–21, 13–15, 9–17, 14–12

1 Tetori Sports Hall

27 July 2023
12:30

Boxscore

Armenia	75–52	Gibraltar
Scoring by quarter: 13–6, 18–21, 24–10, 20–15

1 Tetori Sports Hall

27 July 2023
15:00

Boxscore

Malta	47–96	Albania
Scoring by quarter: 5–24, 8–20, 12–31, 22–21

1 Tetori Sports Hall

== Playoffs ==
Semifinals
A1	Kosovo	49
B2	Cyprus	74
B1	Azerbaijan	87
A2	Andorra	64

Final
B2	Cyprus	78
B1	Azerbaijan	75
3rd place match
A1	Kosovo	59
A2	Andorra	97

=== Semifinals ===
26 July 2023
17:30

Boxscore

Azerbaijan	87–64	Andorra
Scoring by quarter: 21–19, 25–12, 28–16, 13–17

1 Tetori Sports Hall

26 July 2023
20:00

Boxscore

Kosovo	49–74	Cyprus
Scoring by quarter: 9–28, 7–25, 15–10, 18–11

1 Tetori Sports Hall

=== 3rd place match ===
27 July 2023
17:30

Boxscore

Kosovo	59–97	Andorra
Scoring by quarter: 15–32, 10–20, 18–22, 16–23

1 Tetori Sports Hall

=== Final ===
27 July 2023
20:00

Boxscore

Cyprus	78–75	Azerbaijan
Scoring by quarter: 21–18, 21–26, 14–14, 22–17

1 Tetori Sports Hall

== Final standings ==
Rank	Team
1st place, gold medalist(s)	Cyprus
2nd place, silver medalist(s)	Azerbaijan
3rd place, bronze medalist(s)	Andorra
4	Kosovo
5	Armenia
6	Albania
7	Malta
8	San Marino
9	Gibraltar

Promoted to the 2024 FIBA U16 EuroBasket Division B
