= 2025 FIBA U16 EuroBasket Division C =

International youth basketball tournament

Tournament details
- Host country: Albania
- City: Shkodër
- Dates: 5–13 July 2025
- Teams: 9 (from 1 confederation)
- Venue: 1 (in 1 host city)

Final positions
- Champions: Luxembourg (3rd title)
- Runners-up: Andorra
- Third place: Armenia

Official website
- www.fiba.basketball

The 2025 FIBA U16 EuroBasket Division C was the 19th edition of the Division C of the European basketball championship for men's under-16 national teams. The tournament was played at Qazim Dervishi Sports Palace in Shkodër, Albania, from 5 to 13 July 2025.

== Participating teams ==
- Albania
- Andorra
- Armenia
- Azerbaijan
- Gibraltar
- Luxembourg ▼ (22nd place, 2024 FIBA U16 EuroBasket Division B)
- Malta
- Moldova
- San Marino

== First round ==
The draw of the first round was held on 28 January 2025 in Freising, Germany.

In the first round, the teams were drawn into two groups. The first two teams from each group advanced to the semifinals; the other teams were dropped to the 5th–9th place classification group.

All times are local (Central European Summer Time; UTC+2).

=== Group A ===
Pos	Team	Pld	W	L	PF	PA	PD	Pts	Qualification
1	Armenia	3	3	0	273	165	+108	6	Semifinals
2	Albania	3	2	1	210	204	+6	5	Semifinals
3	Moldova	3	1	2	186	193	−7	4	5th–9th place classification
4	Malta	3	0	3	148	255	−107	3	5th–9th place classification

Source: FIBA

5 July 2025
19:00

Boxscore

Albania	87–49	Malta
Scoring by quarter: 23–14, 16–12, 30–5, 18–18

Qazim Dervishi Sports Palace

5 July 2025
21:30

Boxscore

Armenia	80–56	Moldova
Scoring by quarter: 18–11, 24–4, 17–19, 21–22

Qazim Dervishi Sports Palace

7 July 2025
14:00

Boxscore

Malta	46–96	Armenia
Scoring by quarter: 14–27, 9–22, 5–30, 18–17

Qazim Dervishi Sports Palace

7 July 2025
19:00

Boxscore

Moldova	58–60	Albania
Scoring by quarter: 18–13, 12–20, 17–15, 11–12

Qazim Dervishi Sports Palace

10 July 2025
14:00

Boxscore

Moldova	72–53	Malta
Scoring by quarter: 21–23, 16–10, 24–2, 11–18

Qazim Dervishi Sports Palace

10 July 2025
19:00

Boxscore

Albania	63–97	Armenia
Scoring by quarter: 14–20, 15–28, 21–25, 13–24

Qazim Dervishi Sports Palace

=== Group B ===
Pos	Team	Pld	W	L	PF	PA	PD	Pts	Qualification
1	Luxembourg	4	4	0	371	170	+201	8	Semifinals
2	Andorra	4	3	1	278	188	+90	7	Semifinals
3	Azerbaijan	4	2	2	254	238	+16	6	5th–9th place classification
4	San Marino	4	1	3	224	362	−138	5	5th–9th place classification
5	Gibraltar	4	0	4	170	339	−169	4	5th–9th place classification

Source: FIBA

5 July 2025
14:00

Boxscore

Luxembourg	109–39	Gibraltar
Scoring by quarter: 20–12, 33–7, 35–11, 21–9
Pts: Macalou 22; Rebs: Macalou 11; Asts: Delgado 11		Pts: Sandhu 11; Rebs: Cassaglia, Lines 6 Asts: Lejeune 3

Qazim Dervishi Sports Palace
Attendance: 50
Referees: Edison Gjoni (ALB), Milosav Kaludjerovic (MNE), Kyriacos Christou (CYP)

5 July 2025
16:30

Boxscore

Azerbaijan	105–60	San Marino
Scoring by quarter: 25–22, 32–5, 21–17, 27–16
Pts: Ibrahimov 24; Rebs: Hajizada 12; Asts: Klishev 7		Pts: Giovannini 17; Rebs: Cenni 14; Asts: Cenni 5

Qazim Dervishi Sports Palace
Attendance: 50
Referees: Josip Jurcevic (CRO), Balazs Meszaros (HUN), Dumitru Stasiev (MDA)

6 July 2025
17:00

Boxscore

San Marino	42–119	Luxembourg
Scoring by quarter: 15–28, 6–30, 15–37, 6–24
Pts: Tura 15; Rebs: Tura, Casadei 7 Asts: Suarez Ramirez 4		Pts: Delgado, Macalou 22; Rebs: Delgado 11; Asts: Delgado 8

Qazim Dervishi Sports Palace
Attendance: 50
Referees: Balazs Meszaros (HUN), Edison Gjoni (ALB), Kyriacos Christou (CYP)

6 July 2025
19:30

Boxscore

Andorra	52–42	Azerbaijan
Scoring by quarter: 18–3, 12–12, 9–5, 13–22
Pts: Armengol 13; Rebs: Maanan 10; Asts: Lamelas 3		Pts: Hajizada 9 Rebs: Hajizada 11; Asts: Aghayev 3

Qazim Dervishi Sports Palace
Attendance: 50
Referees: Josip Jurcevic (CRO), Nikolaos Tziopanos (GRE), Dumitru Stasiev (MDA)

7 July 2025
16:30

Boxscore

Gibraltar	56–68	San Marino
Scoring by quarter: 10–16, 20–18, 14–9, 12–25
Pts: Lines 11; Rebs: Wojniak 13; Asts: Sandhu 8		Pts: Giovannini 32; Rebs: Tura 17; Asts: Cenni 5

Qazim Dervishi Sports Palace
Attendance: 50
Referees: Milosav Kaludjerovic (MNE), Nikolaos Tziopanos (GRE), Edison Gjoni (ALB)

7 July 2025
21:30

Boxscore

Luxembourg	57–51	Andorra
Scoring by quarter: 19–8, 17–20, 15–12, 6–11
Pts: Macalou 16; Rebs: Macalou 13; Asts: Macalou 6		Pts: Lamelas 11; Rebs: Vilana 7 Asts: Lamelas, Coll 3

Qazim Dervishi Sports Palace
Attendance: 50
Referees: Josip Jurcevic (CRO), Kyriacos Christou (CYP), Dumitru Stasiev (MDA)

9 July 2025
17:00

Boxscore

Azerbaijan	38–86	Luxembourg
Scoring by quarter: 11–31, 4–16, 10–22, 13–17
Pts: Isayev 15; Rebs: Isayev 11; Asts: Valioghlu 3		Pts: Delgado 26; Rebs: Delgado 9 Asts: Wilmes 5

Qazim Dervishi Sports Palace
Attendance: 50
Referees: Josip Jurcevic (CRO), Nikolaos Tziopanos (GRE), Kyriacos Christou (CYP)

9 July 2025
19:30

Boxscore

Andorra	93–35	Gibraltar
Scoring by quarter: 24–7, 21–9, 29–6, 19–13
Pts: Lamelas 18; Rebs: Soria 10; Asts: Lamelas 7		Pts: Sandhu 15; Rebs: Sandhu 7 Asts: Sandhu 2

Qazim Dervishi Sports Palace
Attendance: 50
Referees: Milosav Kaludjerovic (MNE), Balazs Meszaros (HUN), Edison Gjoni (ALB)

10 July 2025
16:30

Boxscore

San Marino	54–82	Andorra
Scoring by quarter: 9–21, 18–22, 15–24, 12–15
Pts: Tura 16; Rebs: Tura 14; Asts: Cenni 4		Pts: Pallerola 17; Rebs: Pallerola 8 Asts: Lamelas 6

Qazim Dervishi Sports Palace
Attendance: 50
Referees: Josip Jurcevic (CRO), Kyriacos Christou (CYP), Dumitru Stasiev (MDA)

10 July 2025
21:30

Boxscore

Gibraltar	40–69	Azerbaijan
Scoring by quarter: 9–14, 15–14, 2–25, 14–16
Pts: Sandhu 17; Rebs: Wojniak 9 Asts: three players 1		Pts: Hajizada 12; Rebs: Isayev 16; Asts: Aghayev 4

Qazim Dervishi Sports Palace
Attendance: 50
Referees: Edison Gjoni (ALB), Balazs Meszaros (HUN), Milosav Kaludjerovic (MNE)

== 5th–9th place classification ==
Pos	Team	Pld	W	L	PF	PA	PD	Pts
5	Azerbaijan	4	4	0	330	218	+112	8
6	Moldova	4	3	1	272	246	+26	7
7	San Marino	4	2	2	273	307	−34	6
8	Malta	4	1	3	259	285	−26	5
9	Gibraltar	4	0	4	201	279	−78	4

Source: FIBA

11 July 2025
17:00

Boxscore

Moldova	62–52	Gibraltar
Scoring by quarter: 18–13, 19–13, 13–8, 12–18
Pts: Sevcenco 11; Rebs: Sevcenco 13; Asts: Rusu 6		Pts: Sandhu 17; Rebs: Wojniak 11; Asts: three players 2

Qazim Dervishi Sports Palace
Attendance: 50
Referees: Julien Malane (LUX), Ruslan Khaligov (AZE), Hasan Bajgoric (BIH)

11 July 2025
19:30

Boxscore

Malta	80–83	San Marino
Scoring by quarter: 20–18, 32–19, 19–27, 9–19
Pts: Said Hollier 33; Rebs: Godhwani 18; Asts: Buttigieg 8		Pts: Giovannini 29; Rebs: Tura 14; Asts: Giovannini 6

Qazim Dervishi Sports Palace
Attendance: 50
Referees: Igor Esteve Malmierca (AND), Dumitru Stasiev (MDA), Elldin Uglari (KOS)

12 July 2025
14:00

Boxscore

San Marino	62–66	Moldova
Scoring by quarter: 19–20, 12–9, 18–22, 13–15
Pts: Tura 34; Rebs: Tura 16; Asts: Cenni 4		Pts: Rusu 17; Rebs: Babii, Rusu 9 Asts: Rusu 6

Qazim Dervishi Sports Palace
Attendance: 50
Referees: Igor Esteve Malmierca (AND), Elldin Uglari (KOS), Ruslan Khaligov (AZE)

12 July 2025
16:30

Boxscore

Azerbaijan	77–46	Malta
Scoring by quarter: 11–11, 21–15, 23–11, 22–9
Pts: Ibrahimov 20; Rebs: Isayev 14; Asts: Ibrahimov 7		Pts: Micallef 10; Rebs: Said Hollier, Godhwani 7 Asts: Said Hollier 4

Qazim Dervishi Sports Palace
Attendance: 50
Referees: Edison Gjoni (ALB), Julien Malane (LUX), Dumitru Stasiev (MDA)

13 July 2025
14:00

Boxscore

Moldova	72–79	Azerbaijan
Scoring by quarter: 18–16, 10–31, 18–15, 26–17

Qazim Dervishi Sports Palace

13 July 2025
16:30

Boxscore

Malta	80–53	Gibraltar
Scoring by quarter: 16–13, 21–16, 18–11, 25–13

Qazim Dervishi Sports Palace

== Championship playoffs ==
Semifinals
A1	Armenia	78
B2	Andorra	87
B1	Luxembourg	108
A2	Albania	69

Final
B2	Andorra	55
B1	Luxembourg	68
3rd place match
A1	Armenia	118
A2	Albania	78

=== Semifinals ===
12 July 2025
19:00

Boxscore

Luxembourg	108–69	Albania
Scoring by quarter: 38–17, 18–22, 26–18, 26–12
Pts: Delgado, Russell 19; Rebs: 3 players 7 Asts: Delgado 10		Pts: Mema 20; Rebs: Gorodezki 6 Asts: Bokaj 4

Qazim Dervishi Sports Palace
Attendance: 150
Referees: Josip Jurcevic (CRO), Balazs Meszaros (HUN), Hasan Bajgoric (BIH)

12 July 2025
21:30

Boxscore

Armenia	78–87	Andorra
Scoring by quarter: 18–31, 18–19, 21–18, 21–19
Pts: Parrot 21; Rebs: Keshishyan 11; Asts: Agabekyan, Karibyan 5		Pts: Matencio, Armengol 16; Rebs: Coll 15; Asts: Lamelas 9

Qazim Dervishi Sports Palace
Attendance: 50
Referees: Nikolaos Tziopanos (GRE), Milosav Kaludjerovic (MNE), Elldin Uglari (KOS)

=== 3rd place match ===
13 July 2025
19:00

Boxscore

Armenia	118–78	Albania
Scoring by quarter: 23–21, 32–8, 31–25, 32–24

Qazim Dervishi Sports Palace

=== Final ===
13 July 2025
21:30

Boxscore

Andorra	55–68	Luxembourg
Scoring by quarter: 15–16, 10–14, 15–20, 15–18

Qazim Dervishi Sports Palace

== Final standings ==
Rank	Team
1st place, gold medalist(s)	Luxembourg
2nd place, silver medalist(s)	Andorra
3rd place, bronze medalist(s)	Armenia
4	Albania
5	Azerbaijan
6	Moldova
7	San Marino
8	Malta
9	Gibraltar
