= 2019 FIBA U16 European Championship Division C =

Tournament details
- Host country: Albania
- City: Tirana
- Dates: 14–21 July 2019
- Teams: 9 (from 1 confederation)
- Venue: 1 (in 1 host city)

Final positions
- Champions: Luxembourg (2nd title)
- Runners-up: Andorra
- Third place: Wales

Tournament statistics
- MVP: (Andorra) Miguel Marti Chamorro
- Top scorer: (Andorra) Miguel Marti Chamorro (24.8 ppg)
- Top rebounds: (Moldova) Stefan Florea (18.0 rpg)
- Top assists: (Albania) Brian Cuka (5.3 apg)

Official website
- www.fiba.basketball

The 2019 FIBA U16 European Championship Division C was the 15th edition of the Division C of the FIBA U16 European Championship, the third tier of the European men's under-16 basketball championship. It was played in Tirana, Albania, from 14 to 21 July 2019. Nine teams participated in the competition. Luxembourg men's national under-16 basketball team won the tournament.

== Participating teams ==
- Albania (hosts)
- Andorra
- Gibraltar
- Luxembourg ▼ (24th place, 2018 FIBA U16 European Championship Division B)
- Malta
- Moldova
- San Marino
- Scotland
- Wales

== First round ==
=== Group A ===
Pos	Team	Pld	W	L	PF	PA	PD	Pts	Qualification
1	Wales	3	3	0	235	109	+126	6	Semifinals
2	Andorra	3	2	1	189	198	−9	5	Semifinals
3	Gibraltar	3	1	2	183	173	+10	4	5th–9th place classification
4	Malta	3	0	3	134	261	−127	3	5th–9th place classification

Source: FIBA

14 July 2019

Report

Wales	72–41	Andorra

Tirana Olympic Park

14 July 2019

Report

Gibraltar	82–41	Malta

Tirana Olympic Park

16 July 2019

Report

Malta	31–103	Wales

Tirana Olympic Park

16 July 2019

Report

Andorra	72–64	Gibraltar

Tirana Olympic Park

18 July 2019

Report

Wales	60–37	Gibraltar

Tirana Olympic Park

18 July 2019

Report

Malta	62–76	Andorra

Tirana Olympic Park

=== Group B ===
Pos	Team	Pld	W	L	PF	PA	PD	Pts	Qualification
1	Scotland	4	4	0	358	208	+150	8	Semifinals
2	Luxembourg	4	3	1	356	216	+140	7	Semifinals
3	Albania	4	2	2	276	267	+9	6	5th–9th place classification
4	Moldova	4	1	3	234	323	−89	5	5th–9th place classification
5	San Marino	4	0	4	137	347	−210	4	5th–9th place classification

Source: FIBA

14 July 2019

Report

Scotland	90–66	Albania

Tirana Olympic Park

14 July 2019

Report

Luxembourg	97–55	Moldova

Tirana Olympic Park

15 July 2019

Report

San Marino	33–103	Luxembourg

Tirana Olympic Park

15 July 2019

Report

Moldova	48–98	Scotland

Tirana Olympic Park

16 July 2019

Report

Scotland	94–31	San Marino

Tirana Olympic Park

16 July 2019

Report

Albania	87–52	Moldova

Tirana Olympic Park

17 July 2019

Report

San Marino	32–71	Albania

Tirana Olympic Park

17 July 2019

Report

Luxembourg	63–76	Scotland

Tirana Olympic Park

18 July 2019

Report

Moldova	79–41	San Marino

Tirana Olympic Park

18 July 2019

Report

Albania	52–93	Luxembourg

Tirana Olympic Park

== 5th–9th place classification ==
Pos	Team	Pld	W	L	PF	PA	PD	Pts
5	Albania	4	4	0	329	186	+143	8
6	Moldova	4	3	1	295	216	+79	7
7	Gibraltar	4	2	2	231	213	+18	6
8	San Marino	4	1	3	168	261	−93	5
9	Malta	4	0	4	193	340	−147	4

Source: FIBA

19 July 2019

Report

Malta	42–103	Moldova

Tirana Olympic Park

19 July 2019

Report

Gibraltar	56–37	San Marino

Tirana Olympic Park

20 July 2019

Report

Albania	97–55	Malta

Tirana Olympic Park

20 July 2019

Report

Moldova	61–46	Gibraltar

Tirana Olympic Park

21 July 2019

Report

Malta	55–58	San Marino

Tirana Olympic Park

21 July 2019

Report

Gibraltar	47–74	Albania

Tirana Olympic Park

== Championship playoffs ==
Semifinals
10 July
Wales	56
Luxembourg	57
10 July
Scotland	67
Andorra	77

Final
11 July
Luxembourg	78
Andorra	50
3rd place match
11 July
Wales	84
Scotland	72

=== Semifinals ===
20 July 2019

Report

Wales	56–57	Luxembourg

Tirana Olympic Park

20 July 2019

Report

Scotland	67–77	Andorra

Tirana Olympic Park

=== 3rd place match ===
21 July 2019

Report

Wales	84–72	Scotland

Tirana Olympic Park

=== Final ===
21 July 2019

Report

Luxembourg	78–50	Andorra

Tirana Olympic Park
Referees: Srđan Dožai (CRO), Gentian Cici (ALB), Thomas Kerisit (FRA)

== Final standings ==
Rank	Team	Record
1st place, gold medalist(s)	Luxembourg	5–1
2nd place, silver medalist(s)	Andorra	3–2
3rd place, bronze medalist(s)	Wales	4–1
4	Scotland	4–2
5	Albania	4–2
6	Moldova	3–3
7	Gibraltar	2–4
8	San Marino	1–5
9	Malta	0–6

Promoted to the 2022 FIBA U16 European Championship Division B
