= Austria men's national under-16 basketball team =

Youth basketball team representing Austria

Austria
- FIBA zone: FIBA Europe
- National federation: Austrian Basketball Federation

U17 World Cup
- Appearances: None

U16 EuroBasket
- Appearances: 4
- Medals: None

U16 EuroBasket Division B
- Appearances: 19
- Medals: None

U16 EuroBasket Division C
- Appearances: 1
- Medals: Bronze: 1 (2018)

The Austria men's national under-16 basketball team is a national basketball team of Austria, administered by the Austrian Basketball Federation. It represents the country in international under-16 men's basketball competitions.

In 1970s, the team participated four times at the European Championship for Cadets. They won a bronze medal at the 2018 FIBA U16 European Championship Division C.

== FIBA U16 EuroBasket participations ==
Year	Division A	Division B
1971	11th	
1973	15th	
1975	17th	
1979	11th	
2004		15th
2005		15th
2006		4th
2007		14th
2008		14th
2009		17th
2010		20th
2011		21st

Year	Division A	Division B	Division C
2012		21st	
2013		14th	
2014		8th	
2015		14th	
2016		22nd	
2018			3rd place, bronze medalist(s)
2019		21st	
2022		8th	
2023		18th	
2024		14th	
2025		21st	
2026		12th	

== See also ==
- Austria men's national basketball team
- Austria men's national under-18 basketball team
- Austria women's national under-16 basketball team
