= 2024 FIBA U16 EuroBasket Division C =

International basketball competition

Tournament details
- Host country: Albania
- City: Tirana
- Dates: 9–14 July 2024
- Teams: 8 (from 1 confederation)
- Venue: 1 (in 1 host city)

Final positions
- Champions: Kosovo (1st title)
- Runners-up: Albania
- Third place: Armenia

Tournament statistics
- Top scorer: (Moldova) Alexei Svetenco (19.6 ppg)
- Top rebounds: (Moldova) Alexei Svetenco (13.0 rpg)
- Top assists: (Kosovo) Lis Binishi (4.6 apg)
- PPG (Team): Kosovo (101.8 ppg)
- RPG (Team): Kosovo (58.6 rpg)
- APG (Team): Kosovo (21.2 apg)

Official website
- www.fiba.basketball

The 2024 FIBA U16 EuroBasket Division C was the 18th edition of the Division C of the European basketball championship for men's under-16 national teams. The tournament was played in Tirana, Albania, from 9 to 14 July 2024.

== Participating teams ==
- Albania
- Armenia
- Azerbaijan
- Gibraltar
- Kosovo
- Malta
- Moldova
- San Marino

== First round ==
The draw of the first round was held on 6 February 2024 in Freising, Germany.

In the first round, the teams were drawn into two groups of four. The first two teams from each group advanced to the semifinals; the third and fourth teams advanced to the 5th–8th place playoffs.

All times are local (Central European Summer Time – UTC+2).

=== Group A ===
Pos	Team	Pld	W	L	PF	PA	PD	Pts	Qualification
1	Albania	3	3	0	233	173	+60	6	Semifinals
2	Azerbaijan	3	2	1	190	165	+25	5	Semifinals
3	Republic of Moldova	3	1	2	195	224	−29	4	5th–8th place playoffs
4	Malta	3	0	3	160	216	−56	3	5th–8th place playoffs

Source: FIBA

9 July 2024
12:00

Boxscore

Republic of Moldova	72–61	Malta
Scoring by quarter: 17–9, 19–14, 19–27, 17–11
Pts: Svetenco 28; Rebs: Svetenco 20; Asts: Musuc 4		Pts: Ka. Fabri 40; Rebs: Sammut 7 Asts: Fenech Pace, Galea 3

Feti Borova - National Olympic Centre
Attendance: 50
Referees: Ioannis Tiganis (GRE), Stefan Kuburovic (MNE), Amar Djekovic (KOS)

9 July 2024
19:30

Boxscore

Albania	60–56	Azerbaijan
Scoring by quarter: 15–11, 10–12, 17–18, 18–15
Pts: Nilo 23; Rebs: Nasi, Nilo 8 Asts: Leskoviku 5		Pts: Abdullayev 22; Rebs: Gaflanov 13; Asts: Guliyev 5

Feti Borova - National Olympic Centre
Attendance: 200
Referees: Viktor Nagy (HUN), Milosav Kaludjerovic (MNE), Rainis Värv (EST)

10 July 2024
14:30

Boxscore

Azerbaijan	78–55	Republic of Moldova
Scoring by quarter: 20–11, 9–26, 23–9, 26–9
Pts: Abdullayev 24; Rebs: Mammadov 13; Asts: Abdullayev 8		Pts: Parada 16; Rebs: Musuc, Parada 10; Asts: Svetenco 6

Feti Borova - National Olympic Centre
Attendance: 50
Referees: Stefan Kuburovic (MNE), Mikheil Vartanov (GEO), Amar Djekovic (KOS)

10 July 2024
19:30

Boxscore

Malta	49–88	Albania
Scoring by quarter: 4–27, 17–19, 13–30, 15–12
Pts: Ka. Fabri 13; Rebs: Kr. Fabri 8 Asts: Eight players 1		Pts: White 21; Rebs: Qyrfycja 12; Asts: Qeli 4

Feti Borova - National Olympic Centre
Attendance: 100
Referees: Viktor Nagy (HUN), Ioannis Tiganis (GRE), Milosav Kaludjerovic (MNE)

11 July 2024
14:30

Boxscore

Azerbaijan	56–50	Malta
Scoring by quarter: 24–12, 12–22, 16–7, 4–9
Pts: Abdullayev 19; Rebs: Gaflanov 16; Asts: Guliyev 6		Pts: Zammit 22; Rebs: Zammit, Fenech Pace 7 Asts: Ka. Fabri 7

Feti Borova - National Olympic Centre
Attendance: 60
Referees: Viktor Nagy (HUN), Milosav Kaludjerovic (MNE), Mikheil Vartanov (GEO)

11 July 2024
19:30

Boxscore

Republic of Moldova	68–85	Albania
Pts: Parada 19; Rebs: Svetenco, Parada 12; Asts: Musuc 2		Pts: White 24; Rebs: Nasi 11; Asts: Kotori 3

Feti Borova - National Olympic Centre
Attendance: 120
Referees: Petr Hrusa (CZE), Ioannis Tiganis (GRE), Amar Djekovic (KOS)

=== Group B ===
Pos	Team	Pld	W	L	PF	PA	PD	Pts	Qualification
1	Kosovo	3	3	0	332	134	+198	6	Semifinals
2	Armenia	3	2	1	222	179	+43	5	Semifinals
3	Gibraltar	3	1	2	121	283	−162	4	5th–8th place playoffs
4	San Marino	3	0	3	158	237	−79	3	5th–8th place playoffs

Source: FIBA

9 July 2024
14:30

Boxscore

Kosovo	139–23	Gibraltar
Scoring by quarter: 30–10, 25–9, 31–1, 53–3
Pts: Bytyqi 24; Rebs: Agusholli 12; Asts: Lis Binishi 7		Pts: Davis 7 Rebs: Navarro 7 Asts: Lima, Andrews 1

Feti Borova - National Olympic Centre
Attendance: 60
Referees: Petr Hrusa (CZE), Edison Gjoni (ALB), Mikheil Vartanov (GEO)

9 July 2024
17:00

Boxscore

San Marino	53–72	Armenia
Scoring by quarter: 9–19, 14–13, 14–22, 16–18
Pts: F. San Martini 14; Rebs: Mazzucco 8 Asts: M. San Martini, Ceccarini 2		Pts: Masumyan 19; Rebs: Masumyan 14; Asts: Vognerubov 6

Feti Borova - National Olympic Centre
Attendance: 30
Referees: Polat Parlak (TUR), Ruslan Khaligov (AZE), Dumitru Stasiev (MDA)

10 July 2024
12:00

Boxscore

Gibraltar	60–54	San Marino
Scoring by quarter: 12–12, 12–22, 17–18, 19–2
Pts: Navarro 23; Rebs: Navarro 12; Asts: Felice, O'Connor 1		Pts: F. San Martini 18; Rebs: F. San Martini 9 Asts: Tura 4

Feti Borova - National Olympic Centre
Attendance: 50
Referees: Petr Hrusa (CZE), Rainis Värv (EST), Ruslan Khaligov (AZE)

10 July 2024
17:00

Boxscore

Armenia	60–88	Kosovo
Scoring by quarter: 11–20, 9–24, 13–25, 27–19
Pts: Khachatryan 11; Rebs: Masumyan 8 Asts: Agabekyan, Khachatryan 2		Pts: Kastrati 15; Rebs: Binishi 10; Asts: Kastrati 6

Feti Borova - National Olympic Centre
Attendance: 50
Referees: Polat Parlak (TUR), Edison Gjoni (ALB), Dumitru Stasiev (MDA)

11 July 2024
12:00

Boxscore

Gibraltar	38–90	Armenia
Scoring by quarter: 10–18, 2–33, 20–21, 6–18
Pts: Navarro 11; Rebs: Sylvester, El Zain 5 Asts: O'Connor 3		Pts: Khachatryan 18; Rebs: Kakoyan 10; Asts: Vognerubov 3

Feti Borova - National Olympic Centre
Attendance: 50
Referees: Polat Parlak (TUR), Rainis Värv (EST), Dumitru Stasiev (MDA)

11 July 2024
17:00

Boxscore

San Marino	51–105	Kosovo
Scoring by quarter: 8–25, 12–20, 23–24, 8–36
Pts: F. San Martini 12; Rebs: F. San Martini 8 Asts: Three players 2		Pts: Kastrati 21; Rebs: Bojku 6 Asts: Binishi 5

Feti Borova - National Olympic Centre
Attendance: 30
Referees: Stefan Kuburovic (MNE), Ruslan Khaligov (AZE), Edison Gjoni (ALB)

== 5th–8th place playoffs ==
5th–8th place semifinals
A3	Republic of Moldova	54
B4	San Marino	66
B3	Gibraltar	51
A4	Malta	59

5th place match
San Marino	70
Malta	40
7th place match
Republic of Moldova	91
Gibraltar	29

=== 5th–8th place semifinals ===
13 July 2024
12:00

Boxscore

Gibraltar	51–59	Malta
Scoring by quarter: 11–19, 11–10, 16–15, 13–15
Pts: Navarro 18; Rebs: Navarro 18; Asts: Davis 4		Pts: Ka. Fabri 19; Rebs: Sammut 13; Asts: Zammit 4

Feti Borova - National Olympic Centre
Attendance: 30
Referees: Stefan Kuburovic (MNE), Amar Djekovic (KOS), Dumitru Stasiev (MDA)

13 July 2024
14:30

Boxscore

Republic of Moldova	54–66	San Marino
Scoring by quarter: 15–13, 19–12, 13–22, 7–19
Pts: Svetenco 21; Rebs: Parada 14; Asts: Svetenco, Musuc 3		Pts: F. San Martini 19; Rebs: Mazzucco 9 Asts: F. San Martini 5

Feti Borova - National Olympic Centre
Attendance: 20
Referees: Edison Gjoni (ALB), Milosav Kaludjerovic (MNE), Ruslan Khaligov (AZE)

=== 7th place match ===
14 July 2024
12:00

Boxscore

Republic of Moldova	91–29	Gibraltar
Scoring by quarter: 16–8, 24–5, 26–4, 25–12
Pts: Svetenco 27; Rebs: Svetenco 15; Asts: Musuc 7		Pts: Andrews 9 Rebs: Sylvester 12; Asts: Four players 1

Feti Borova - National Olympic Centre
Attendance: 60
Referees: Viktor Nagy (HUN), Stefan Kuburovic (MNE), Ruslan Khaligov (AZE)

=== 5th place match ===
14 July 2024
14:30

Boxscore

San Marino	70–40	Malta
Scoring by quarter: 24–11, 25–11, 12–5, 9–13
Pts: F. San Martini 16; Rebs: F. San Martini, Falcioni 8 Asts: F. San Martini, Mazzucco 4		Pts: Sammut 10; Rebs: Sammut 8 Asts: Galea 2

Feti Borova - National Olympic Centre
Attendance: 70
Referees: Milosav Kaludjerovic (MNE), Amar Djekovic (KOS), Dumitru Stasiev (MDA)

== Championship playoffs ==
Semifinals
A1	Albania	82
B2	Armenia	81
B1	Kosovo	76
A2	Azerbaijan	41

Final
Albania	61
Kosovo	101
3rd place match
Armenia	71
Azerbaijan	63

=== Semifinals ===
13 July 2024
17:00

Boxscore

Kosovo	76–41	Azerbaijan
Scoring by quarter: 13–12, 23–9, 19–16, 21–4
Pts: Kastrati 32; Rebs: Binishi 12; Asts: Binishi 4		Pts: Abdullayev 14; Rebs: Gaflanov 11; Asts: Mirzayev 4

Feti Borova - National Olympic Centre
Attendance: 100
Referees: Ioannis Tiganis (GRE), Petr Hrusa (CZE), Rainis Värv (EST)

13 July 2024
19:30

Boxscore

Albania	82–81	Armenia
Scoring by quarter: 8–17, 30–17, 21–25, 23–22
Pts: Nilo 31; Rebs: Nasi 9 Asts: Leskoviku 3		Pts: Masumyan 20; Rebs: Kakoyan 18; Asts: Vognerubov 4

Feti Borova - National Olympic Centre
Attendance: 200
Referees: Polat Parlak (TUR), Viktor Nagy (HUN), Mikheil Vartanov (GEO)

=== 3rd place match ===
14 July 2024
17:00

Boxscore

Armenia	71–63	Azerbaijan
Scoring by quarter: 11–18, 15–10, 21–11, 24–24
Pts: Masumyan 20; Rebs: Masumyan, Kakoyan 10; Asts: Vognerubov, Kakoyan 5		Pts: Mammadov 29; Rebs: Mammadov 15; Asts: Mirzayev, Guliyev 5

Feti Borova - National Olympic Centre
Referees: Petr Hrusa (CZE), Rainis Värv (EST), Edison Gjoni (ALB)

=== Final ===
14 July 2024
19:30

Boxscore

Albania	61–101	Kosovo
Scoring by quarter: 8–28, 18–23, 11–18, 24–32
Pts: Bilali 19; Rebs: Cenko 8 Asts: Three players 2		Pts: Bytyqi 22; Rebs: Yildirim 13; Asts: Binishi 6

Feti Borova - National Olympic Centre
Attendance: 350
Referees: Polat Parlak (TUR), Ioannis Tiganis (GRE), Mikheil Vartanov (GEO)

== Final standings ==
Rank	Team
1st place, gold medalist(s)	Kosovo
2nd place, silver medalist(s)	Albania
3rd place, bronze medalist(s)	Armenia
4	Azerbaijan
5	San Marino
6	Malta
7	Republic of Moldova
8	Gibraltar
