= 2011 FIBA Europe Under-16 Championship Division C =

2011 division C basketball championship in San Marino

2011 EuroBasket Under-16
25th FIBA Europe Under-16 Championship

Tournament details
- Host country: San Marino
- Dates: 12–17 July 2011
- Teams: 6
- Venue(s): 1 (in 1 host city)

Final positions
- Champions: Andorra (2nd title)

Tournament statistics
- MVP: (Andorra) J. Moliné
- Top scorer: (San Marino) J. Gualtieri (33.8)
- Top rebounds: (Malta) A. Falzon (24.4)
- Top assists: (Andorra) J. Moliné (3.0)
- PPG (Team): Andorra (81.0)
- RPG (Team): Andorra (61.5)
- APG (Team): Andorra (11.3)

Official website
- Official web

The 2011 FIBA U16 European Championship Division C was held in Serravalle, San Marino, from 12 to 17 July 2011. Six teams participated in the competition.

== Participating teams ==
- Andorra
- Gibraltar
- Malta
- Monaco
- San Marino (hosts)
- Wales

== Group phase ==
=== Group A ===
Pos	Team	Pld	W	L	PF	PA	PD	Pts	Team advances to
1	Andorra	2	2	0	169	70	+99	4	Semifinals
2	Wales	2	1	1	116	109	+7	3	Quarterfinals
3	Monaco	2	0	2	61	167	−106	2	Quarterfinals

Source: FIBA Europe

=== Group B ===
Pos	Team	Pld	W	L	PF	PA	PD	Pts	Team advances to
1	San Marino	2	2	0	165	110	+55	4	Semifinals
2	Malta	2	1	1	157	124	+33	3	Quarterfinals
3	Gibraltar	2	0	2	85	173	−88	2	Quarterfinals

Source: FIBA Europe

== Knockout stage ==
=== Bracket ===
Quarterfinals
15 July
Malta	74
Monaco	45
15 July
Wales	70
Gibraltar	20

Semifinals
16 July
Andorra	76
Malta	49
16 July
San Marino	80
Wales	73

Final
17 July
Andorra	84
San Marino	70
Third place
17 July
Malta	67
Wales	77

== Final standings ==
Rank	Team	Record
1st place, gold medalist(s)	Andorra	4–0
2nd place, silver medalist(s)	San Marino	3–1
3rd place, bronze medalist(s)	Wales	3–2
4	Malta	2–3
5	Monaco	1–3
6	Gibraltar	0–4
