= 1979 FIBA Europe Under-16 Championship =

Youth basketball tournament

1979 EuroBasket Under-16
5th FIBA Europe Under-16 Championship

Tournament details
- Host country: Syria
- Dates: 19–27 July 1979
- Teams: 11
- Venue(s): (in 1 host city)

Final positions
- Champions: Yugoslavia (2nd title)

The 1979 FIBA Europe Under-16 Championship (known at that time as 1979 European Championship for Cadets) was the 5th edition of the FIBA Europe Under-16 Championship. The city of Damascus, in Syria, hosted the tournament. Yugoslavia won the trophy for the second time and tied with the Soviet Union as the most winning countries in the tournament.

== Teams ==
- Austria
- Belgium
- Bulgaria
- Greece
- Italy
- Soviet Union
- Spain
- Syria
- Turkey
- West Germany
- Yugoslavia

== Preliminary round ==
The eleven teams were allocated in two groups (one of five and one of six teams).

Team advanced to Semifinals
Team competed in 5th–8th playoffs
Team competed in 9th–11th round

=== Group A ===
Team	Pld	W	L	PF	PA	Pts
Italy	4	4	0	380	279	8
West Germany	4	3	1	305	288	7
Syria	4	1	3	310	307	5
Belgium	4	1	3	284	333	5
Turkey	4	1	3	272	344	5

=== Group B ===
Team	Pld	W	L	PF	PA	Pts
Yugoslavia	5	5	0	477	371	10
Spain	5	4	1	506	352	9
Soviet Union	5	3	2	447	389	8
Bulgaria	5	2	3	412	399	7
Greece	5	1	4	378	397	6
Austria	5	0	5	287	599	5

== Knockout stage ==
Ninth place
Tenth place
Eleventh place

=== 9th–11th round ===
Team	Pld	W	L	PF	PA	Pts
Greece	2	2	0	168	122	4
Turkey	2	1	1	187	143	3
Austria	0	0	2	106	196	2

=== 5th–8th playoffs ===
Playoffs
Syria	79
Bulgaria	104
Soviet Union	111
Belgium	70

Fifth place
Bulgaria	75
Soviet Union	91
Seventh place
Syria	104
Belgium	74

=== Championship ===
Semifinals
Italy	76
Spain	69
Yugoslavia	95
West Germany	73

Final
Italy	100
Yugoslavia	103
Third place
Spain	122
West Germany	82

== Final standings ==
Rank	Team
Gold medal	Yugoslavia
Silver medal	Italy
Bronze medal	Spain
4th	West Germany
5th	Soviet Union
6th	Bulgaria
7th	Syria
8th	Belgium
9th	Greece
10th	Turkey
11th	Austria

1979 FIBA Europe U-16 Championship

Yugoslavia
Second title

Team roster

Srđan Dabić, Nebojša Zorkić, Marko Ivanović, Matej Janžek, Milan Benčić, Zoran Čutura, Dragan Zovko, Tomislav Tiringer, Jurica Kos, Robert Medved, Željko Mrnjavac, and Jurid Kebe. Head coach: Luka Stančić.
