= Gibraltar men's national under-16 basketball team =

Gibraltar
- FIBA zone: FIBA Europe
- National federation: Gibraltar Amateur Basketball Association

U17 World Cup
- Appearances: None

U16 EuroBasket
- Appearances: None

U16 EuroBasket Division B
- Appearances: None

U16 EuroBasket Division C
- Appearances: 19
- Medals: Gold: 1 (2013); Silver: 1 (2017); Bronze: 1 (2012)

The Gibraltar men's national under-16 basketball team is a national basketball team of Gibraltar, administered by the Gibraltar Amateur Basketball Association. It represents the country in under-16 men's international basketball competitions.

The team won three medals at the FIBA U16 EuroBasket Division C.

== FIBA U16 EuroBasket participations ==
Year	Result in Division C
2000	5th
2002	6th
2004	5th
2008	4th
2010	8th
2011	6th
2012	3rd place, bronze medalist(s)
2013	1st place, gold medalist(s)
2014	4th
2015	8th

Year	Result in Division C
2016	4th
2017	2nd place, silver medalist(s)
2018	10th
2019	7th
2022	8th
2023	9th
2024	8th
2025	9th
2026	8th

== See also ==
- Gibraltar men's national basketball team
- Gibraltar men's national under-18 basketball team
- Gibraltar women's national under-16 basketball team
