= FIBA U16 EuroBasket =

International boys' basketball tournament

- Most recent season or competition: 2026 FIBA U16 EuroBasket
- Sport: Basketball
- Founded: 1971
- Organizing body: FIBA Europe
- Divisions: 3
- No. of teams: 16 (Division A)
- Continent: Europe
- Most recent champion: Latvia (1st title)
- Most titles: Yugoslavia (9 titles)
- Related competitions: FIBA U18 EuroBasket; FIBA U20 EuroBasket
- Website: www.fiba.basketball/history

The FIBA U16 EuroBasket, formerly the FIBA U16 European Championship, and originally the FIBA European Championship for Cadets, is an annual youth basketball competition contested by the under-16 men's national teams from FIBA Europe.

The inaugural tournament was in 1971, and was held biennially until 2003. Since 2004, the competition has been played every year. In odd-numbered years, it also serves as the European qualification path for the FIBA Under-17 Basketball World Cup.

The current champions are Latvia, having beaten France in the 2026 final.

== Division A ==
=== Results ===
Year	Host	Gold medal game			Bronze medal game		
Year	Host	Gold	Score	Silver	Bronze	Score	Fourth place
1971 details	Italy (Gorizia)	Yugoslavia	74–60	Italy	Soviet Union	56–55	Spain
1973 details	Italy (Angri & Summonte)	Soviet Union	68–57	Spain	Yugoslavia	77–74	Italy
1975 details	Greece (Athens & Thessaloniki)	Soviet Union	64–61	Greece	Yugoslavia	74–72	Italy
1977 details	France (Le Touquet & Berck)	Turkey	68–66	Yugoslavia	Soviet Union	95–70	Italy
1979 details	Syria (Damascus)	Yugoslavia	103–100	Italy	Spain	122–82	West Germany
1981 details	Greece (Thessaloniki & Katerini)	Soviet Union	72–57	Italy	West Germany	78–64	Finland
1983 details	West Germany (Tübingen & Ludwigsburg)	Yugoslavia	89–86	Spain	West Germany	72–69	Greece
1985 details	Bulgaria (Ruse)	Yugoslavia	99–81	Spain	Italy	85–81	West Germany
1987 details	Hungary (Székesfehérvár & Kaposvár)	Yugoslavia	83–77	Italy	Soviet Union	84–76	Spain
1989 details	Spain (Guadalajara, Tarancón & Cuenca)	Greece	81–79	Yugoslavia	Italy	63–59	Turkey
1991 details	Greece (Kastoria, Komotini & Thessaloniki)	Italy	106–91	Greece	Spain	87–67	Turkey
1993 details	Turkey (Trabzon, Giresun & Samsun)	Greece	76–58	Spain	Russia	72–62	Turkey
1995 details	Portugal (Setúbal, Seixal & Almada)	Croatia	75–62	Spain	Greece	73–72	North Macedonia
1997 details	Belgium (Pepinster, Kortrijk & Quaregnon)	FR Yugoslavia	100–87	Russia	Israel	65–55	France
1999 details	Slovenia (Polzela, Celje & Laško)	FR Yugoslavia	59–48	Greece	Turkey	81–63	France
2001 details	Latvia (Riga)	FR Yugoslavia	55–43	Russia	Spain	75–74	Lithuania
2003 details	Spain (Madrid)	Serbia and Montenegro	83–68	Turkey	Russia	92–70	Spain
2004 details	Greece (Amaliada & Pyrgos)	France	65–60	Russia	Turkey	75–69	Lithuania
2005 details	Spain (León)	Turkey	61–55	France	Spain	70–63	Lithuania
2006 details	Spain (Linares, Andújar & Martos)	Spain	110–106	Russia	Serbia and Montenegro	85–69	Croatia
2007 details	Greece (Ierapetra, Rethymno & Heraklion)	Serbia	56–55	Spain	Lithuania	65–55	Turkey
2008 details	Italy (Chieti)	Lithuania	75–33	Czech Republic	Turkey	77–65	France
2009 details	Lithuania (Kaunas)	Spain	70–64	Lithuania	Serbia	75–69	Poland
2010 details	Montenegro (Bar)	Croatia	80–52	Lithuania	Turkey	75–64	Spain
2011 details	Czech Republic (Pardubice, Hradec Králové)	Croatia	67–57	Czech Republic	Spain	61–53	France
2012 details	Lithuania (Panevėžys, Vilnius) & Latvia (Ventspils)	Turkey	66–61	France	Serbia	83–69	Italy
2013 details	Ukraine (Kyiv)	Spain	65–63	Serbia	Greece	78–50	Italy
2014 details	Latvia (Riga, Ogre, Liepāja, Grobiņa)	France	78–53	Latvia	Spain	77–73	Turkey
2015 details	Lithuania (Kaunas)	Bosnia and Herzegovina	85–83	Lithuania	Turkey	83–72	Spain
2016 details	Poland (Radom)	Spain	74–72	Lithuania	Turkey	77–70	Croatia
2017 details	Montenegro (Podgorica)	France	75–68	Montenegro	Serbia	76–71	Croatia
2018 details	Serbia (Novi Sad)	Croatia	71–70	Spain	Turkey	82–59	France
2019 details	Italy (Udine)	Spain	70–61	France	Italy	73–68	Russia
2020	North Macedonia	Cancelled due to COVID-19 pandemic in North Macedonia.					
2021	North Macedonia	Cancelled due to COVID-19 pandemic in Europe. The 2021 FIBA U16 European Challengers were played instead.					
2022 details	North Macedonia (Skopje)	Lithuania	77–68	Spain	France	65–46	Greece
2023 details	North Macedonia (Skopje)	Spain	77–68	Italy	France	88–62	Lithuania
2024 details	Greece (Heraklion)	France	82–70	Spain	Serbia	74–65	Greece
2025 details	Georgia (Tbilisi)	Serbia	99–86	Lithuania	Slovenia	79–71	Italy
2026 details	Romania (Oradea)	Latvia	75–69	France	Spain	96–93	Lithuania
2027 details	Romania (Oradea)		–			–	

=== Medal table ===
Rank	Nation	Gold	Silver	Bronze	Total
1	Yugoslavia	9	2	2	13
2	Spain	6	9	7	22
3	France	4	4	2	10
4	Croatia	4	0	0	4
5	Turkey	3	1	7	11
6	Soviet Union	3	0	3	6
7	Lithuania	2	5	1	8
8	Greece	2	3	2	7
9	Serbia	2	1	4	7
10	Italy	1	5	3	9
11	Latvia	1	1	0	2
12	Bosnia and Herzegovina	1	0	0	1
13	Russia	0	4	2	6
14	Czech Republic	0	2	0	2
15	Montenegro	0	1	0	1
16	Germany	0	0	2	2
17	Israel	0	0	1	1
17	Serbia and Montenegro	0	0	1	1
17	Slovenia	0	0	1	1
Totals (19 entries)		38	38	38	114

- Defunct countries in italics.

=== Participation details ===
==== Tournaments 1971–1991 ====
Team	(Italy) 1971	(Italy) 1973	(Greece) 1975	(France) 1977	(Syria) 1979	(Greece) 1981	(West Germany) 1983	(Bulgaria) 1985	(Hungary) 1987	(Spain) 1989	(Greece) 1991
Austria	11th	15th	17th	–	11th	–	–	–	–	–	–
Belgium	–	10th	7th	7th	8th	–	–	9th	11th	12th	11th
Bulgaria	–	–	10th	12th	6th	–	–	6th	–	10th	9th
Czechoslovakia †	–	11th	8th	–	–	–	–	–	–	–	10th
England	–	16th	18th	–	–	–	–	–	–	–	–
Finland	–	–	–	–	–	4th	12th	10th	–	–	–
France	7th	7th	15th	6th	–	10th	7th	12th	5th	8th	–
Greece	5th	5th	2nd	8th	9th	7th	4th	–	7th	1st	2nd
Hungary	–	–	–	–	–	–	11th	–	12th	–	–
Iceland	–	–	16th	–	–	–	–	–	–	–	–
Israel	6th	6th	11th	11th	–	8th	–	7th	9th	7th	6th
Italy	2nd	4th	4th	4th	2nd	2nd	5th	3rd	2nd	3rd	1st
Netherlands	–	–	6th	–	–	–	8th	–	–	–	–
Poland	–	9th	14th	9th	–	11th	–	–	–	11th	–
Portugal	–	14th	13th	–	–	–	–	–	–	–	–
Romania	–	–	–	–	–	–	–	–	8th	–	–
Scotland	–	–	19th	–	–	–	–	–	–	–	–
Soviet Union †	3rd	1st	1st	3rd	5th	1st	6th	5th	3rd	5th	5th
Spain	4th	2nd	5th	5th	3rd	9th	2nd	2nd	4th	6th	3rd
Sweden	10th	12th	12th	–	–	12th	10th	11th	–	–	–
Switzerland	12th	–	–	–	–	–	–	–	–	–	12th
Syria	–	–	–	–	7th	–	–	–	–	–	–
Turkey	8th	8th	–	1st	10th	6th	9th	8th	10th	4th	4th
Wales	–	–	20th	–	–	–	–	–	–	–	–
West Germany	9th	13th	9th	10th	4th	3rd	3rd	4th	6th	9th	7th
Yugoslavia †	1st	3rd	3rd	2nd	1st	5th	1st	1st	1st	2nd	8th
Team	(Italy) 1971	(Italy) 1973	(Greece) 1975	(France) 1977	(Syria) 1979	(Greece) 1981	(West Germany) 1983	(Bulgaria) 1985	(Hungary) 1987	(Spain) 1989	(Greece) 1991

==== Tournaments 1993–2012 ====
Team	(Turkey) 1993	(Portugal) 1995	(Belgium) 1997	(Slovenia) 1999	(Latvia) 2001	(Spain) 2003	(Greece) 2004	(Spain) 2005	(Spain) 2006	(Greece) 2007	(Italy) 2008	(Lithuania) 2009	(Montenegro) 2010	(Czech Republic) 2011	(Lithuania) (Latvia) 2012
Belgium	–	–	12th	–	–	–	12th	16th	–	–	–	–	–	–	–
Bulgaria	–	–	–	–	–	12th	–	–	–	–	–	–	12th	15th	–
Croatia	–	1st	8th	9th	12th	–	10th	8th	4th	8th	7th	6th	1st	1st	8th
Czech Republic	12th	11th	–	–	–	–	–	–	–	13th	2nd	16th	–	2nd	15th
Denmark	–	–	–	–	–	–	–	–	–	–	–	–	16th	–	–
England	–	12th	–	–	–	–	–	–	–	–	–	–	–	–	16th
France	7th	6th	4th	4th	5th	5th	1st	2nd	5th	6th	4th	7th	6th	4th	2nd
Georgia	–	–	9th	7th	11th	–	15th	–	–	12th	16th	–	–	–	–
Germany	10th	–	16th	–	–	–	–	–	15th	–	–	11th	13th	8th	5th
Greece	1st	3rd	5th	2nd	6th	8th	5th	13th	9th	7th	12th	14th	10th	11th	9th
Hungary	–	–	–	–	–	–	–	–	–	–	15th	–	–	–	–
Iceland	9th	–	–	–	–	–	–	14th	16th	–	–	–	–	–	–
Israel	8th	8th	3rd	–	9th	10th	11th	9th	7th	11th	11th	13th	15th	–	–
Italy	6th	5th	11th	–	10th	9th	6th	7th	6th	5th	13th	12th	9th	10th	4th
Latvia	–	–	–	5th	8th	–	13th	11th	11th	9th	10th	9th	14th	6th	10th
Lithuania	5th	–	–	–	4th	11th	4th	4th	10th	3rd	1st	2nd	2nd	13th	11th
Montenegro	played as part of (Serbia and Montenegro)									–	–	10th	8th	16th	–
North Macedonia	–	4th	10th	6th	–	7th	–	–	–	–	–	–	–	–	–
Poland	11th	–	–	10th	–	–	14th	15th	–	–	14th	4th	11th	14th	6th
Portugal	–	9th	–	–	–	–	–	–	14th	16th	–	–	–	–	–
Russia	3rd	–	2nd	11th	2nd	3rd	2nd	6th	2nd	14th	8th	5th	7th	5th	13th
Serbia	played as part of (Serbia and Montenegro)									1st	5th	3rd	5th	9th	3rd
Serbia and Montenegro †^{A}	–	–	1st	1st	1st	1st	9th	10th	3rd	defunct					
Slovenia	–	–	7th	12th	–	6th	8th	12th	13th	15th	–	–	–	–	14th
Spain	2nd	2nd	6th	8th	3rd	4th	7th	3rd	1st	2nd	6th	1st	4th	3rd	7th
Turkey	4th	7th	–	3rd	7th	2nd	3rd	1st	8th	4th	3rd	8th	3rd	7th	1st
Ukraine	–	–	–	–	–	–	–	5th	12th	10th	9th	15th	–	12th	12th
Team	(Turkey) 1993	(Portugal) 1995	(Belgium) 1997	(Slovenia) 1999	(Latvia) 2001	(Spain) 2003	(Greece) 2004	(Spain) 2005	(Spain) 2006	(Greece) 2007	(Italy) 2008	(Lithuania) 2009	(Montenegro) 2010	(Czech Republic) 2011	(Lithuania) (Latvia) 2012
Austria	playing in lower divisions														
Finland	playing in lower divisions														
Netherlands	playing in lower divisions														
Romania	playing in lower divisions														
Sweden	playing in lower divisions														
Switzerland	playing in lower divisions														
Scotland †	playing in lower divisions														
Wales †	playing in lower divisions														
Syria	playing in FIBA Asia														
Czechoslovakia †	defunct														
Soviet Union †	defunct														
Yugoslavia †	defunct														

==== Tournaments 2013–present ====
Team	(Ukraine) 2013	(Latvia) 2014	(Lithuania) 2015	(Poland) 2016	(Montenegro) 2017	(Serbia) 2018	(Italy) 2019	(North Macedonia) 2022	(North Macedonia) 2023	(Greece) 2024	(Georgia (country)) 2025	(Romania) 2026	(Romania) 2027	Total
Belgium	14th	–	–	–	–	–	–	–	15th	–	–	14th		14
Bosnia and Herzegovina	–	8th	1st	14th	–	–	16th	–	–	–	–	–		4
Bulgaria	–	–	–	–	–	–	–	–	–	15th	–	–		9
Croatia	6th	11th	9th	4th	4th	1st	8th	14th	–	16th	–	–		21
Czech Republic	–	–	–	–	–	–	–	–	–	–	–	11th		8
Denmark	–	16th	–	–	–	–	–	16th	–	–	–	–		3
England †	–	–	14th	–	Great Britain									5
Estonia	–	–	–	13th	12th	11th	15th	–	–	–	14th	–		5
Finland	–	13th	6th	5th	15th	–	–	–	12th	11th	15th	–		10
France	5th	1st	5th	6th	1st	4th	2nd	3rd	3rd	1st	5th	2nd		36
Georgia	–	–	–	–	–	16th	–	–	–	13th	11th	16th		10
Germany	8th	7th	7th	9th	13th	9th	14th	–	5th	10th	9th	5th		29
Greece	3rd	9th	13th	16th	–	6th	6th	4th	8th	4th	10th	6th		36
Israel	–	–	15th	–	11th	10th	11th	5th	13th	6th	13th	13th		30
Italy	4th	5th	10th	7th	9th	12th	3rd	6th	2nd	5th	4th	12th		37
Latvia	13th	2nd	11th	11th	8th	8th	13th	10th	11th	7th	6th	1st		23
Lithuania	9th	10th	2nd	2nd	6th	7th	9th	1st	4th	9th	2nd	4th		24
Montenegro	15th	–	12th	8th	2nd	14th	–	9th	14th	–	–	–		9
Netherlands	–	–	–	–	–	15th	–	15th	–	–	–	–		4
North Macedonia	–	–	–	–	–	–	12th	12th	16th	–	–	–		7
Poland	12th	15th	–	15th	–	–	–	11th	9th	14th	–	7th		20
Romania	–	–	–	–	–	–	–	–	–	–	12th	8th	Q	3
Russia	11th	12th	16th	–	16th	–	4th	–	–	–	–	–		20
Serbia	2nd	6th	8th	10th	3rd	5th	7th	13th	7th	3rd	1st	9th		18
Slovenia	–	–	–	–	10th	13th	10th	7th	6th	12th	3rd	15th		16
Spain	1st	3rd	4th	1st	7th	2nd	1st	2nd	1st	2nd	8th	3rd		38
Sweden	16th	–	–	12th	14th	–	–	–	–	–	–	–		9
Switzerland	–	–	–	–	–	–	–	–	–	–	16th	–		3
Turkey	7th	4th	3rd	3rd	5th	3rd	5th	8th	10th	8th	7th	10th		36
Ukraine	10th	14th	–	–	–	–	–	–	–	–	–	–		9
Team	(Ukraine) 2013	(Latvia) 2014	(Lithuania) 2015	(Poland) 2016	(Montenegro) 2017	(Serbia) 2018	(Italy) 2019	(North Macedonia) 2022	(North Macedonia) 2023	(Greece) 2024	(Georgia (country)) 2025	(Romania) 2026	(Romania) 2027	Total
Austria	playing in lower divisions													4
Hungary	playing in lower divisions													3
Iceland	playing in lower divisions													4
Portugal	playing in lower divisions													5
Scotland †	playing in lower divisions				Great Britain									1
Wales †	playing in lower divisions				Great Britain									1
Syria	playing in FIBA Asia													1
Czechoslovakia †	defunct													3
Soviet Union †	defunct													11
Yugoslavia †	defunct													11
Serbia and Montenegro †^{A}	defunct													7

^{^A} As FR Yugoslavia (1993–2001, 3 participations, 3 gold medals) and as Serbia and Montenegro (2003–2006, 4 participations, 2 medals)

=== MVP Awards (since 1999) ===
Year	MVP Award Winner
1999	(Federal Republic of Yugoslavia) Aleksandar Gajić
2001	(Federal Republic of Yugoslavia) Veljko Tomović
2003	(Serbia and Montenegro) Nemanja Aleksandrov
2004	(Russia) Vitaly Kuznetsov
2005	(France) Antoine Diot
2006	(Spain) Ricky Rubio
2007	(Serbia) Dejan Musli
2008	(Lithuania) Jonas Valančiūnas
2009	(Lithuania) Tauras Jogėla
2010	(Croatia) Dario Šarić
2011	(Croatia) Mario Hezonja
2012	(Turkey) Okben Ulubay
2013	(Serbia) Stefan Peno
2014	(France) Killian Tillie
2015	(Bosnia and Herzegovina) Džanan Musa
2016	(Spain) Usman Garuba
2017	(France) Killian Hayes
2018	(Croatia) Roko Prkačin
2019	(Spain) Rubén Domínguez
2022	(Spain) Mario Saint-Supery
2023	(Spain) Guillermo del Pino
2024	(France) Cameron Houindo
2025	(Serbia) Nikola Kusturica
2026	(Latvia) Benjamin Berrouet

== Division B ==
=== Results ===
Year	Host	Promoted to Division A			Bronze medal game		
Year	Host	Gold	Score	Silver	Bronze *	Score	Fourth place
2004 details	England (Brighton); Bulgaria (Veliko Tarnovo)	Ukraine	round robin	Iceland	Macedonia	round robin	England
2005 details	Bulgaria (Pravets)	Germany	77–63	Portugal	Georgia	77–67	Bosnia and Herzegovina
2006 details	Estonia (Tallinn)	Czech Republic	67–54	Georgia	Bulgaria	85–75*	Austria
2007 details	Republic of Macedonia (Skopje)	Poland	80–73	Hungary	Sweden	66–65*	England
2008 details	Bosnia and Herzegovina (Sarajevo)	Germany	76–69	Montenegro	Bulgaria	81–61	Sweden
2009 details	Portugal (São João da Madeira)	Bulgaria	81–63	Denmark	England	78–63	Slovenia
2010 details	Estonia (Tallinn)	Czech Republic	61–53	Ukraine	Slovenia	62–60	Netherlands
2011 details	Republic of Macedonia (Strumica)	Slovenia	82–73	England	Bosnia and Herzegovina	72–71	Israel
2012 details	Romania (Bucharest)	Belgium	56–46	Montenegro	Sweden	79–55	Hungary
2013 details	Bosnia and Herzegovina (Sarajevo)	Denmark	72–69	Bosnia and Herzegovina	Finland	96–62	Slovenia
2014 details	Republic of Macedonia (Strumica)	Montenegro	76–73	Israel	England	84–60	Czech Republic
2015 details	Bulgaria (Sofia)	Estonia	64–56	Poland	Sweden	57–56	Slovakia
2016 details	Bulgaria (Sofia)	Russia	82–76	Israel	Slovenia	79–71	Ukraine
2017 details	Bulgaria (Sofia)	Greece	74–60	Netherlands	Georgia	64–63	Great Britain
2018 details	Bosnia and Herzegovina (Sarajevo)	Russia	83–77	Bosnia and Herzegovina	Macedonia	84–66	Czech Republic
2019 details	Montenegro (Podgorica)	Poland	71–58	Netherlands	Denmark	85–54	Montenegro
2020	Bulgaria	Cancelled due to COVID-19 pandemic in Bulgaria.					
2021	Bulgaria	Cancelled due to COVID-19 pandemic in Europe. The 2021 FIBA U16 European Challengers were played instead.					
2022 details	Bulgaria (Sofia)	Germany	100–72	Finland	Belgium	81–61	Bulgaria
2023 details	Romania (Pitești)	Croatia	85–67	Bulgaria	Georgia	70–68	Romania
2024 details	North Macedonia (Skopje)	Estonia	76–71	Romania	Switzerland	80–75	Belgium
2025 details	North Macedonia (Skopje)	Poland	68–67	Belgium	Czech Republic	85–67	Portugal
2026 details	North Macedonia (Gevgelija & Skopje)	Croatia	69–67	Iceland	Estonia	83–67	Bosnia and Herzegovina

- Since 2012, the 3rd team in Division B is also promoted to Division A for the next tournament.

=== Medal table ===
Rank	Nation	Gold	Silver	Bronze	Total
1	Poland	3	1	0	4
2	Germany	3	0	0	3
3	Czech Republic	2	0	1	3
3	Estonia	2	0	1	3
5	Croatia	2	0	0	2
5	Russia	2	0	0	2
7	Montenegro	1	2	0	3
8	Bulgaria	1	1	2	4
9	Belgium	1	1	1	3
9	Denmark	1	1	1	3
11	Slovenia	1	0	2	3
12	Greece	1	0	0	1
13	Bosnia and Herzegovina	0	2	1	3
14	Iceland	0	2	0	2
14	Israel	0	2	0	2
14	Netherlands	0	2	0	2
17	England	0	1	3	4
17	Georgia	0	1	3	4
19	Finland	0	1	1	2
19	North Macedonia	0	1	1	2
21	Hungary	0	1	0	1
21	Portugal	0	1	0	1
21	Romania	0	1	0	1
21	Ukraine	0	1	0	1
25	Sweden	0	0	3	3
26	Switzerland	0	0	1	1
Totals (26 entries)		20	22	21	63

=== Participation details ===
Team	(England) (Bulgaria) 2004	(Bulgaria) 2005	(Estonia) 2006	(North Macedonia) 2007	(Bosnia and Herzegovina) 2008	(Portugal) 2009	(Estonia) 2010	(North Macedonia) 2011	(Romania) 2012	(Bosnia and Herzegovina) 2013	(North Macedonia) 2014	(Bulgaria) 2015	(Bulgaria) 2016	(Bulgaria) 2017	(Bosnia and Herzegovina) 2018	(Montenegro) 2019	(Bulgaria) 2022	(Romania) 2023	(North Macedonia) 2024	(North Macedonia) 2025	(North Macedonia) 2026	Total
Albania	9th										17th											2
Armenia								6th														1
Austria	15th	15th	4th	14th	14th	17th	20th	21st	21st	14th	8th	14th	22nd			21st	8th	18th	14th	21st	12th	19
Belarus	7th			15th	6th	11th	18th		10th	20th		24th	6th	9th	16th	17th						12
Belgium			10th	9th	9th	9th	13th	10th	1st		5th	6th	7th	6th	9th	5th	3rd		4th	2nd		16
Bosnia and Herzegovina	2nd	4th	5th	5th	7th			3rd	5th	2nd				12th	2nd		6th	11th	18th	7th	4th	15
Bulgaria	3rd	8th	3rd	17th	3rd	1st			15th	19th	12th	9th	17th	14th	11th	6th	4th	2nd		14th	13th	17
Croatia																		1st		8th	1st	2
Cyprus	8th	17th		8th	20th			18th						22nd	21st	18th	22nd		20th	19th	19th	12
Czech Republic	4th	13th	1st				1st			5th	4th	16th	8th	8th	4th	7th	16th	8th	15th	3rd		15
Denmark					18th	2nd		17th	13th	1st		11th	19th	18th	12th	3rd		9th	16th	9th	17th	14
England	3rd	7th	8th	4th	11th	3rd	11th	2nd		6th	3rd		5th	Great Britain								11
Estonia	6th	5th	12th	12th	10th		16th	12th	17th	16th	14th	1st					18th	6th	1st		3rd	15
Finland	7th	11th	6th	11th	8th	6th	9th	11th	11th	3rd					13th	13th	2nd				9th	14
Georgia		3rd	2nd			10th	5th	16th	12th	7th	10th	5th	12th	3rd		20th	12th	3rd				14
Germany		1st		10th	1st												1st					4
Great Britain	played separately as (England) , (Scotland) and (Wales)													4th	7th	10th	10th	10th	12th	15th	7th	8
Greece														1st								1
Hungary	6th	10th	11th	2nd		7th	6th	5th	4th	13th	7th	13th	13th	7th	17th	14th	13th	5th	9th	13th	15th	20
Iceland	1st				13th							18th	21st	13th	6th	15th	5th	15th	13th	10th	2nd	12
Ireland	10th	14th	16th	16th		14th	15th	20th		18th	21st	19th	20th	11th	15th	16th	21st	21st	17th	12th	11th	19
Israel								4th	6th	9th	2nd		2nd									5
Kosovo													14th	19th	23rd	24th				22nd		5
Luxembourg			14th			16th	12th	15th	18th	21st	22nd	20th	23rd	20th	24th		20th	14th	22nd		22nd	15
Montenegro				6th	2nd				2nd		1st					4th			5th	5th	6th	8
Netherlands	5th	18th	13th	7th	17th	15th	4th	7th	9th	12th	11th	8th	11th	2nd		2nd		17th	7th	18th	5th	19
North Macedonia	2nd	16th		18th	15th			19th	7th	8th	9th	22nd	16th	15th	3rd				10th	16th	14th	15
Norway			15th	20th			19th		20th	22nd	19th	21st	18th	24th	22nd	23rd	17th	20th	19th	20th	20th	16
Poland			7th	1st								2nd		10th	5th	1st				1st		7
Portugal	4th	2nd			16th	13th	10th	9th	8th	15th	20th	12th	9th	16th	14th	11th	9th	13th	11th	4th	18th	19
Romania	5th	12th	18th	19th	19th	8th	17th	8th	14th	10th	15th	17th	15th	21st	8th	8th	15th	4th	2nd			19
Russia													1st		1st							2
Scotland											18th	23rd	24th	Great Britain								3
Slovakia		6th	17th	13th		12th	8th	22nd	19th	17th		4th	10th	23rd	20th	19th	19th	7th	6th	17th	10th	18
Slovenia					5th	4th	3rd	1st		4th	6th	7th	3rd									8
Sweden	9th	9th	9th	3rd	4th	5th	14th	14th	3rd		13th	3rd			19th	12th	7th	12th	8th	11th	8th	18
Switzerland					12th		7th	13th	16th	11th	16th	15th		17th	18th	22nd	11th	19th	3rd		21st	14
Ukraine	1st						2nd					10th	4th	5th	10th	9th	14th	16th	21st	6th	16th	12
Team	(England) (Bulgaria) 2004	(Bulgaria) 2005	(Estonia) 2006	(North Macedonia) 2007	(Bosnia and Herzegovina) 2008	(Portugal) 2009	(Estonia) 2010	(North Macedonia) 2011	(Romania) 2012	(Bosnia and Herzegovina) 2013	(North Macedonia) 2014	(Bulgaria) 2015	(Bulgaria) 2016	(Bulgaria) 2017	(Bosnia and Herzegovina) 2018	(Montenegro) 2019	(Bulgaria) 2022	(Romania) 2023	(North Macedonia) 2024	(North Macedonia) 2025	(North Macedonia) 2026	Total

== Division C ==
=== Results ===
Year	Host	Gold medal game			Bronze medal game		
Year	Host	Gold	Score	Silver	Bronze	Score	Fourth place
2000 details	Malta	Scotland	round robin	Andorra	Malta	round robin	Wales
2002 details	Cyprus	Cyprus	round robin	Luxembourg	Scotland	round robin	Andorra
2004 details	Andorra	Andorra	round robin	Luxembourg	Scotland	round robin	Wales
2006 details	Andorra	Luxembourg	85–69	Scotland	Cyprus	59–42	Malta
2008 details	Gibraltar	Scotland	102–39	Wales	Moldova	75–69 (2OT)	Gibraltar
2010 details	Andorra	Cyprus	74–30	Scotland	Andorra	86–54	San Marino
2011 details	San Marino	Andorra	84–70	San Marino	Wales	77–67	Malta
2012 details	Gibraltar	Monaco	61–53	Scotland	Gibraltar	50–45	San Marino
2013 details	Gibraltar	Gibraltar	round robin	Scotland	Andorra	round robin	Wales
2014 details	Malta	Malta	round robin	Andorra	Wales	round robin	Gibraltar
2015 details	San Marino	San Marino	76–59	Kosovo	Malta	55–44	Wales
2016 details	Cyprus	Cyprus	62–50	Azerbaijan	Moldova	81–56	Gibraltar
2017 details	Andorra	Armenia	88–70	Gibraltar	Azerbaijan	75–55	Andorra
2018 details	San Marino	Andorra	84–49	Wales	Austria	65–43	San Marino
2019 details	Albania	Luxembourg	78–50	Andorra	Wales	84–72	Scotland
2020	Kosovo	Cancelled due to COVID-19 pandemic in Kosovo.					
2021	Kosovo	Cancelled due to COVID-19 pandemic in Europe. The 2021 FIBA U16 European Challengers were played instead.					
2022 details	Kosovo	Andorra	84-65	Armenia	Albania	68-53	Kosovo
2023 details	Kosovo	Cyprus	78–75	Azerbaijan	Andorra	97-59	Kosovo
2024 details	Albania	Kosovo	101–61	Albania	Armenia	71–63	Azerbaijan
2025 details	Albania	Luxembourg	68–55	Andorra	Armenia	118–78	Albania
2026 details	Armenia	Armenia	97–68	Malta	Kosovo	86–70	Moldova

=== Medal table ===
Rank	Nation	Gold	Silver	Bronze	Total
1	Andorra	4	4	3	11
2	Cyprus	4	0	1	5
3	Luxembourg	3	2	0	5
4	Scotland	2	4	2	8
5	Armenia	2	1	2	5
6	Malta	1	1	2	4
7	Gibraltar	1	1	1	3
7	Kosovo	1	1	1	3
9	San Marino	1	1	0	2
10	Monaco	1	0	0	1
11	Wales	0	2	3	5
12	Azerbaijan	0	2	1	3
13	Albania	0	1	1	2
14	Moldova	0	0	2	2
15	Austria	0	0	1	1
Totals (15 entries)		20	20	20	60

=== Participation details ===
Team	(Malta) 2000	(Cyprus) 2002	(Andorra) 2004	(Andorra) 2006	(Gibraltar) 2008	(Andorra) 2010	(San Marino) 2011	(Gibraltar) 2012	(Gibraltar) 2013	(Malta) 2014	(San Marino) 2015	(Cyprus) 2016	(Andorra) 2017	(San Marino) 2018	(Albania) 2019	(Kosovo) 2022	(Kosovo) 2023	(Albania) 2024	(Albania) 2025	(Armenia) 2026	Total
Albania											5th	10th	6th	8th	5th	3rd	6th	2nd	4th	7th	10
Andorra	2nd	4th	1st	6th	7th	3rd	1st	5th	3rd	2nd	6th	6th	4th	1st	2nd	1st	3rd		2nd	5th	19
Armenia												8th	1st			2nd	5th	3rd	3rd	1st	7
Austria														3rd							1
Azerbaijan												2nd	3rd	6th			2nd	4th	5th		6
Cyprus		1st		3rd		1st						1st					1st				5
Gibraltar	5th	6th	5th		4th	8th	6th	3rd	1st	4th	8th	4th	2nd	10th	7th	8th	9th	8th	9th	8th	19
Kosovo											2nd					4th	4th	1st		3rd	5
Luxembourg		2nd	2nd	1st											1st				1st		6
Malta	3rd	5th		4th	6th	6th	4th	6th		1st	3rd	5th	10th	7th	9th	6th	7th	6th	8th	2nd	18
Moldova					3rd							3rd	8th	9th	6th	5th		7th	6th	4th	9
Monaco				8th	5th	7th	5th	1st			7th		5th							6th	8
San Marino				5th	8th	4th	2nd	4th	5th	5th	1st	7th	9th	4th	8th	7th	8th	5th	7th	9th	17
Scotland	1st	3rd	3rd	2nd	1st	2nd		2nd	2nd					5th	4th						10
Wales	4th		4th	7th	2nd	5th	3rd	7th	4th	3rd	4th	9th	7th	2nd	3rd						14
Team	(Malta) 2000	(Cyprus) 2002	(Andorra) 2004	(Andorra) 2006	(Gibraltar) 2008	(Andorra) 2010	(San Marino) 2011	(Gibraltar) 2012	(Gibraltar) 2013	(Malta) 2014	(San Marino) 2015	(Cyprus) 2016	(Andorra) 2017	(San Marino) 2018	(Albania) 2019	(Kosovo) 2022	(Kosovo) 2023	(Albania) 2024	(Albania) 2025	(Armenia) 2026	Total

== Under-17 World Cup record ==
Team	(Germany) 2010	(Lithuania) 2012	(United Arab Emirates) 2014	(Spain) 2016	(Argentina) 2018	(Spain) 2022	(Turkey) 2024	(Turkey) 2026	(Greece) 2028	Total
Bosnia and Herzegovina	–	–	–	9th	–	–	–	–		1
Croatia	–	3rd	–	–	7th	–	–	–		2
Czech Republic	–	8th	–	–	–	–	–	–		1
Finland	–	–	–	12th	–	–	–	–		1
France	–	10th	8th	6th	2nd	3rd	9th	5th		7
Germany	8th	–	–	–	–	–	–	11th		2
Greece	–	–	12th	–	–	–	–	–	Q	2
Italy	–	–	9th	–	–	–	2nd	13th		3
Lithuania	4th	9th	–	3rd	–	4th	5th	7th		6
Montenegro	–	–	–	–	8th	–	–	–		1
Poland	2nd	–	–	–	–	8th	–	–		2
Serbia	5th	–	3rd	–	10th	5th	–	2nd		5
Slovenia	–	–	–	–	–	7th	–	9th		2
Spain	10th	4th	4th	4th	–	2nd	7th	–		6
Turkey	–	–	–	2nd	5th	–	3rd	4th		4
Total	5	5	5	6	5	6	6	6	6	

== See also ==
- FIBA U18 EuroBasket
- FIBA U20 EuroBasket
