= Azerbaijan men's national under-16 basketball team =

Azerbaijan
- FIBA zone: FIBA Europe
- National federation: Azerbaijan Basketball Federation

U17 World Cup
- Appearances: None

U16 EuroBasket
- Appearances: None

U16 EuroBasket Division B
- Appearances: None

U16 EuroBasket Division C
- Appearances: 6
- Medals: Silver: 2 (2016, 2023); Bronze: 1 (2017)

The Azerbaijan men's national under-16 basketball team is a national basketball team of Azerbaijan, administered by the Azerbaijan Basketball Federation. It represents the country in under-16 men's international basketball competitions.

== FIBA U16 EuroBasket participations ==
Year	Result in Division C
2016	2nd place, silver medalist(s)
2017	3rd place, bronze medalist(s)
2018	6th
2023	2nd place, silver medalist(s)
2024	4th
2025	5th

== See also ==
- Azerbaijan men's national basketball team
- Azerbaijan men's national under-18 basketball team
- Azerbaijan women's national under-16 basketball team
