= 2004 FIBA Europe Under-16 Championship Division B =

FIBA EuroBasket 2004
33.5th FIBA European Basketball Championship

Tournament details
- Host country: England & Bulgaria
- Teams: 19

Final positions
- Champions: Ukraine (1st title)

The 2004 FIBA Europe Under-16 Championship Division B was an international basketball competition held in England and Bulgaria in 2004. Iceland, the winner of Group A (Brighton, England) and Ukraine, the winner of Group B (Veliko Tarnovo, Bulgaria) qualified for Division A.

== Medalists ==
1. Ukraine

2. Iceland

3. (North Macedonia) Macedonia

== Final ranking (comparative) ==
1. Ukraine

2. (North Macedonia) Macedonia

3. Iceland

4. England

5. Bosnia and Herzegovina

6. Czech Republic

7. Bulgaria

8. Portugal

9. Hungary

10. Finland

11. Netherlands

12. Estonia

13. Romania

14. Sweden

15. Austria

16. Belarus

17. (Republic of Ireland) Ireland

18. Cyprus

19. Albania
