= Kosovo men's national under-16 basketball team =

Kosovo
- FIBA zone: FIBA Europe
- National federation: Basketball Federation of Kosovo

U17 World Cup
- Appearances: None

U16 EuroBasket
- Appearances: None

U16 EuroBasket Division B
- Appearances: 5
- Medals: None

U16 EuroBasket Division C
- Appearances: 5
- Medals: Gold: 1 (2024); Silver: 1 (2015); Bronze: 1 (2026)
Home	Away

The Kosovo men's national under-16 basketball team (Albanian: Kombëtarja e basketbollit të Kosovës nën 18 vjeç, Serbian: Кошаркашкa репрезентација Косова до 18. године, romanized: Košarkaška reprezentacija Kosova do 18. godine) is a national basketball team of Kosovo, administered by the Basketball Federation of Kosovo. It represents the country in international under-16 men's basketball competitions.

== FIBA U16 EuroBasket participations ==
Year	Division B	Division C
2015		2nd place, silver medalist(s)
2016	14th	
2017	19th	
2018	23rd	
2019	24th	
2022		4th
2023		4th
2024		1st place, gold medalist(s)
2025	22nd	
2026		3rd place, bronze medalist(s)

== See also ==
- Kosovo men's national basketball team
- Kosovo men's national under-18 basketball team
- Kosovo women's national under-16 basketball team
