= San Marino men's national under-16 basketball team =

National sports team

San Marino
- FIBA zone: FIBA Europe
- National federation: San Marino Basketball Federation

U17 World Cup
- Appearances: None

U16 EuroBasket
- Appearances: None

U16 EuroBasket Division B
- Appearances: None

U16 EuroBasket Division C
- Appearances: 17
- Medals: Gold: 1 (2015); Silver: 1 (2011)

The San Marino men's national under-16 basketball team is a national basketball team of San Marino, administered by the San Marino Basketball Federation. It represents the country in under-16 men's international basketball competitions.

The team won two medals at the FIBA U16 EuroBasket Division C.

== FIBA U16 EuroBasket participations ==
Year	Result in Division C
2006	5th
2008	8th
2010	4th
2011	2nd place, silver medalist(s)
2012	4th
2013	5th
2014	5th
2015	1st place, gold medalist(s)
2016	7th

Year	Result in Division C
2017	9th
2018	4th
2019	8th
2022	7th
2023	8th
2024	5th
2025	7th
2026	9th

== See also ==
- San Marino men's national basketball team
- San Marino men's national under-18 basketball team
