= 2006 FIBA Europe Under-16 Championship Division B =

- 2006 FIBA Europe Under-16 Championship Division B

Tournament details
- Host country: Estonia
- Teams: 18

Final positions
- Champions: Czech Republic (1st title)

The 2006 FIBA Europe Under-16 Championship Division B was an international basketball competition held in Estonia in 2006.

== Medalists ==
1. Czech Republic

2. (Georgia (country)) Georgia

3. Bulgaria

== Final ranking (comparative) ==
1. Czech Republic

2. Bulgaria

3. Austria

4. Belgium

5. (Georgia (country)) Georgia

6. Bosnia and Herzegovina

7. Sweden

8. England

9. Finland

10. Poland

11. Norway

12. Estonia

13. Hungary

14. Netherlands

15. Slovakia

16. (Republic of Ireland) Ireland

17. Luxembourg

18. Romania
