= Albania men's national under-16 basketball team =

Albania
- FIBA zone: FIBA Europe
- National federation: Albanian Basketball Federation

U17 World Cup
- Appearances: None

U16 EuroBasket
- Appearances: None

U16 EuroBasket Division B
- Appearances: 2
- Medals: None

U16 EuroBasket Division C
- Appearances: 10
- Medals: Silver: 1 (2024); Bronze: 1 (2022)

The Albania men's national under-16 basketball team is a national basketball team of Albania, administered by the Albanian Basketball Federation (FSHB) (Albanian: Federata Shqiptare e Basketbollit). It represents the country in under-16 men's international basketball competitions.

== FIBA U16 EuroBasket participations ==
Year	Division B	Division C
2004	17th/18th	
2014	17th	
2015		5th
2016		10th
2017		6th
2018		8th

Year	Division B	Division C
2019		5th
2022		3rd place, bronze medalist(s)
2023		6th
2024		2nd place, silver medalist(s)
2025		4th
2026		7th

== See also ==
- Albania men's national basketball team
- Albania men's national under-18 basketball team
- Albania women's national under-16 basketball team
