= 2015 FIBA Europe Under-16 Championship Division C =

Tournament details
- Host country: San Marino
- City: Serravalle
- Dates: 6–11 July 2015
- Teams: 8 (from 1 confederation)
- Venue: 1 (in 1 host city)

Final positions
- Champions: San Marino (1st title)
- Runners-up: Kosovo
- Third place: Malta

Official website
- www.fibaeurope.com

The 2015 FIBA Europe Under-16 Championship Division C was the 11th edition of the Division C of the FIBA U16 European Championship, the third tier of the European men's under-16 basketball championship. It was played in Serravalle, San Marino, from 6 to 11 July 2015. The host team, San Marino, won the tournament.

== Participating teams ==
- Albania
- Andorra
- Gibraltar
- Kosovo
- Malta
- Monaco
- San Marino
- Wales

== First round ==
=== Group A ===
Pos	Team	Pld	W	L	PF	PA	PD	Pts	Qualification
1	San Marino	3	3	0	205	164	+41	6	Semifinals
2	Malta	3	2	1	187	199	−12	5	Semifinals
3	Andorra	3	1	2	197	205	−8	4	5th–8th place playoffs
4	Albania	3	0	3	163	184	−21	3	5th–8th place playoffs

Source: FIBA Archive

6 July 2015

Boxscore

Andorra	74–81	Malta

Arena of WTC San Marino

6 July 2015

Boxscore

Albania	57–62	San Marino

Arena of WTC San Marino

7 July 2015

Boxscore

Malta	58–48	Albania

Arena of WTC San Marino

7 July 2015

Boxscore

San Marino	66–59	Andorra

Arena of WTC San Marino

8 July 2015

Boxscore

Albania	58–64	Andorra

Arena of WTC San Marino

8 July 2015

Boxscore

Malta	48–77	San Marino

Arena of WTC San Marino

=== Group B ===
Pos	Team	Pld	W	L	PF	PA	PD	Pts	Qualification
1	Kosovo	3	3	0	254	118	+136	6	Semifinals
2	Wales	3	2	1	171	173	−2	5	Semifinals
3	Monaco	3	1	2	185	199	−14	4	5th–8th place playoffs
4	Gibraltar	3	0	3	121	241	−120	3	5th–8th place playoffs

Source: FIBA Archive

6 July 2015

Boxscore

Monaco	52–56	Wales

Arena of WTC San Marino

6 July 2015

Boxscore

Gibraltar	27–84	Kosovo

Arena of WTC San Marino

7 July 2015

Boxscore

Wales	80–47	Gibraltar

Arena of WTC San Marino

7 July 2015

Boxscore

Kosovo	96–56	Monaco

Arena of WTC San Marino

8 July 2015

Boxscore

Gibraltar	47–77	Monaco

Arena of WTC San Marino

8 July 2015

Boxscore

Wales	35–74	Kosovo

Arena of WTC San Marino

== 5th–8th place playoffs ==
5th–8th place semifinals
July 10
Andorra	103
Gibraltar	42
July 10
Monaco	40
Albania	78

5th place match
July 11
Andorra	55
Albania	77
7th place match
July 11
Gibraltar	32
Monaco	62

=== 5th–8th place semifinals ===
10 July 2015

Boxscore

Monaco	40–78	Albania

Arena of WTC San Marino

10 July 2015

Boxscore

Andorra	103–42	Gibraltar

Arena of WTC San Marino

=== 7th place match ===
11 July 2015

Boxscore

Gibraltar	32–62	Monaco

Arena of WTC San Marino

=== 5th place match ===
11 July 2015

Boxscore

Andorra	55–77	Albania

Arena of WTC San Marino

== Championship playoffs ==
Semifinals
July 10
San Marino	92
Wales	38
July 10
Kosovo	65
Malta	45

Final
July 11
San Marino	76
Kosovo	59
3rd place match
July 11
Wales	44
Malta	55

=== Semifinals ===
10 July 2015

Boxscore

Kosovo	65–45	Malta

Arena of WTC San Marino

10 July 2015

Boxscore

San Marino	92–38	Wales

Arena of WTC San Marino

=== 3rd place match ===
11 July 2015

Boxscore

Wales	44–55	Malta

Arena of WTC San Marino

=== Final ===
11 July 2015

Boxscore

San Marino	76–59	Kosovo

Arena of WTC San Marino

== Final standings ==
Rank	Team
1st place, gold medalist(s)	San Marino
2nd place, silver medalist(s)	Kosovo
3rd place, bronze medalist(s)	Malta
4	Wales
5	Albania
6	Andorra
7	Monaco
8	Gibraltar
