= Armenia men's national under-16 basketball team =

Armenia
- FIBA zone: FIBA Europe
- National federation: Basketball Federation of Armenia

U17 World Cup
- Appearances: None

U16 EuroBasket
- Appearances: None

U16 EuroBasket Division B
- Appearances: 2
- Medals: None

U16 EuroBasket Division C
- Appearances: 7
- Medals: Gold: 2 (2017, 2026); Silver: 1 (2022); Bronze: 2 (2024, 2025)

The Armenia men's national under-16 basketball team is a national basketball team of Armenia, administered by the Basketball Federation of Armenia. It represents the country in under-16 men's international basketball competitions.

On 27 July 2007, in the first game of the Division B of the FIBA Europe Championship, Armenia was defeated by Bosnia and Herzegovina by 236–27, becoming this game as one of the highest margin wins ever in any international game.

The team won five medals at the FIBA U16 EuroBasket Division C.

== FIBA U16 EuroBasket participations ==
Year	Division B	Division C
2007	21st	
2011	6th	
2016		8th
2017		1st place, gold medalist(s)
2022		2nd place, silver medalist(s)
2023		5th
2024		3rd place, bronze medalist(s)
2025		3rd place, bronze medalist(s)
2026		1st place, gold medalist(s)

== See also ==
- Armenia men's national basketball team
- Armenia men's national under-18 basketball team
- Armenia women's national under-16 basketball team
