= Monaco men's national under-16 basketball team =

Monaco
- FIBA zone: FIBA Europe
- National federation: Fédération Monégasque de Basketball

U17 World Cup
- Appearances: None

U16 EuroBasket
- Appearances: None

U16 EuroBasket Division B
- Appearances: None

U16 EuroBasket Division C
- Appearances: 8
- Medals: Gold: 1 (2012)

The Monaco men's national under-16 basketball team is a national basketball team of Monaco, administered by the Fédération Monégasque de Basketball. It represents the country in under-16 men's international basketball competitions.

The team won a gold medal at the 2012 FIBA Europe Under-16 Championship Division C.

== FIBA U16 EuroBasket participations ==
Year	Result in Division C
2006	8th
2008	5th
2010	7th
2011	5th
2012	1st place, gold medalist(s)
2015	7th
2017	5th
2026	6th

== See also ==
- Monaco men's national basketball team
- Monaco men's national under-18 basketball team
- Monaco women's national under-16 basketball team
