= 2026 FIBA U16 EuroBasket Division C =

International youth basketball tournament

Tournament details
- Host country: Armenia
- City: Yerevan
- Dates: 4–12 July 2026
- Teams: 9 (from 1 confederation)
- Venue: 1 (in 1 host city)

Final positions
- Champions: Armenia (2nd title)
- Runners-up: Malta
- Third place: Kosovo

Official website
- www.fiba.basketball

The 2026 FIBA U16 EuroBasket Division C was the 20th edition of the Division C of the European basketball championship for men's under-16 national teams. The tournament was played at Mika Sport Complex in Yerevan, Armenia, from 4 to 12 July 2026.

Armenia secured their second overall title with a victory over Malta in the final, 97–68.

== Participating teams ==
- Albania
- Andorra
- Armenia
- Gibraltar
- Kosovo ▼ (22nd place, 2025 FIBA U16 EuroBasket Division B)
- Malta
- Moldova
- Monaco
- San Marino

== First round ==
The draw of the first round was held on 5 February 2026 in Freising, Germany.

In the first round, the teams were drawn into two groups. The first two teams from each group advanced to the semifinals; the other teams were dropped to the 5th–9th place classification group.

All times are local (Armenia Time; UTC+4).

=== Group A ===
| Pos | Team | Pld | W | L | PF | PA | PD | Pts | Qualification |
|---|---|---|---|---|---|---|---|---|---|
| 1 | Kosovo | 3 | 3 | 0 | 298 | 176 | +122 | 6 | Semifinals |
| 2 | Moldova | 3 | 2 | 1 | 215 | 183 | +32 | 5 | Semifinals |
| 3 | Albania | 3 | 1 | 2 | 227 | 223 | +4 | 4 | 5th–9th place classification |
| 4 | San Marino | 3 | 0 | 3 | 164 | 322 | −158 | 3 | 5th–9th place classification |

Source: FIBA

4 July 2026
14:00

Boxscore

| Moldova | 58–75 | Kosovo |
Scoring by quarter: 16–26, 12–17, 17–13, 13–19

Mika Sport Complex, Yerevan

4 July 2026
21:30

Boxscore

| San Marino | 59–106 | Albania |
Scoring by quarter: 24–24, 12–25, 8–25, 15–32

Mika Sport Complex, Yerevan

6 July 2026
14:00

Boxscore

| Albania | 56–74 | Moldova |
Scoring by quarter: 22–17, 12–21, 13–17, 9–19

Mika Sport Complex, Yerevan

6 July 2026
19:00

Boxscore

| Kosovo | 133–53 | San Marino |
Scoring by quarter: 33–12, 23–16, 34–13, 43–12

Mika Sport Complex, Yerevan

9 July 2026
14:00

Boxscore

| Albania | 65–90 | Kosovo |
Scoring by quarter: 14–22, 17–27, 18–17, 16–24

Mika Sport Complex, Yerevan

9 July 2026
16:30

Boxscore

| Moldova | 83–52 | San Marino |
Scoring by quarter: 15–12, 22–14, 26–10, 20–16

Mika Sport Complex, Yerevan

=== Group B ===
| Pos | Team | Pld | W | L | PF | PA | PD | Pts | Qualification |
|---|---|---|---|---|---|---|---|---|---|
| 1 | Armenia | 4 | 4 | 0 | 414 | 286 | +128 | 8 | Semifinals |
| 2 | Malta | 4 | 3 | 1 | 403 | 346 | +57 | 7 | Semifinals |
| 3 | Andorra | 4 | 2 | 2 | 321 | 291 | +30 | 6 | 5th–9th place classification |
| 4 | Monaco | 4 | 1 | 3 | 289 | 338 | −49 | 5 | 5th–9th place classification |
| 5 | Gibraltar | 4 | 0 | 4 | 204 | 370 | −166 | 4 | 5th–9th place classification |

Source: FIBA

4 July 2026
16:30

Boxscore

| Malta | 107–73 | Monaco |
Scoring by quarter: 34–11, 20–25, 38–19, 15–18

Mika Sport Complex, Yerevan

4 July 2026
19:00

Boxscore

| Armenia | 98–62 | Andorra |
Scoring by quarter: 26–18, 29–9, 26–24, 17–11

Mika Sport Complex, Yerevan

5 July 2026
19:00

Boxscore

| Gibraltar | 56–109 | Armenia |
Scoring by quarter: 11–36, 16–24, 11–30, 18–19

Mika Sport Complex, Yerevan

5 July 2026
21:30

Boxscore

| Andorra | 109–111 (OT) | Malta |
Scoring by quarter: 27–18, 23–21, 21–25, 25–32, Overtime: 13–15

Mika Sport Complex, Yerevan

6 July 2026
16:30

Boxscore

| Monaco | 56–66 | Andorra |
Scoring by quarter: 15–10, 15–20, 15–10, 11–26

Mika Sport Complex, Yerevan

6 July 2026
21:30

Boxscore

| Malta | 95–67 | Gibraltar |
Scoring by quarter: 11–16, 35–14, 25–20, 24–17

Mika Sport Complex, Yerevan

8 July 2026
19:00

Boxscore

| Armenia | 97–90 | Malta |
Scoring by quarter: 16–12, 27–25, 30–25, 24–28

Mika Sport Complex, Yerevan

8 July 2026
21:30

Boxscore

| Gibraltar | 55–82 | Monaco |
Scoring by quarter: 16–22, 6–26, 17–13, 16–21

Mika Sport Complex, Yerevan

9 July 2026
19:00

Boxscore

| Monaco | 78–110 | Armenia |
Scoring by quarter: 24–33, 13–24, 21–22, 20–31

Mika Sport Complex, Yerevan

9 July 2026
21:30

Boxscore

| Andorra | 84–26 | Gibraltar |
Scoring by quarter: 30–4, 20–6, 15–10, 19–6

Mika Sport Complex, Yerevan

== 5th–9th place classification ==
| Pos | Team | Pld | W | L | PF | PA | PD | Pts |
|---|---|---|---|---|---|---|---|---|
| 5 | Andorra | 4 | 4 | 0 | 360 | 193 | +167 | 8 |
| 6 | Monaco | 4 | 3 | 1 | 341 | 261 | +80 | 7 |
| 7 | Albania | 4 | 2 | 2 | 342 | 288 | +54 | 6 |
| 8 | Gibraltar | 4 | 1 | 3 | 205 | 320 | −115 | 5 |
| 9 | San Marino | 4 | 0 | 4 | 228 | 414 | −186 | 4 |

Source: FIBA

Note: The following matches were carried over from the first round: SMR v. ALB 59–106, MON v. AND 56–66, GIB v. MON 55–82 and AND v. GIB 84–26.

10 July 2026
19:00

Boxscore

| San Marino | 55–113 | Monaco |
Scoring by quarter: 14–32, 15–35, 13–21, 13–25

Mika Sport Complex, Yerevan

10 July 2026
21:30

Boxscore

| Albania | 87–39 | Gibraltar |
Scoring by quarter: 18–22, 23–4, 25–6, 21–7

Mika Sport Complex, Yerevan

11 July 2026
14:00

Boxscore

| Andorra | 110–47 | San Marino |
Scoring by quarter: 41–3, 30–14, 17–18, 22–12

Mika Sport Complex, Yerevan

11 July 2026
16:30

Boxscore

| Monaco | 90–85 | Albania |
Scoring by quarter: 27–21, 17–22, 19–15, 27–27

Mika Sport Complex, Yerevan

12 July 2026
13:00

Boxscore

| San Marino | 67–85 | Gibraltar |
Scoring by quarter: 15–27, 11–28, 18–19, 23–11

Mika Sport Complex, Yerevan

12 July 2026
15:30

Boxscore

| Albania | 64–100 | Andorra |
Scoring by quarter: 17–27, 16–24, 20–26, 11–23

Mika Sport Complex, Yerevan

== Championship playoffs ==
Semifinals
A1 | Kosovo | 110
B2 | Malta | 113
B1 | Armenia | 82
A2 | Moldova | 66

Final
Malta | 68
Armenia | 97
3rd place match
Kosovo | 86
Moldova | 70

=== Semifinals ===
11 July 2026
19:00

Boxscore

| Armenia | 82–66 | Moldova |
Scoring by quarter: 20–14, 24–18, 8–21, 30–13

Mika Sport Complex, Yerevan

11 July 2026
21:30

Boxscore

| Kosovo | 110–113 | Malta |
Scoring by quarter: 19–30, 33–30, 24–34, 34–19

Mika Sport Complex, Yerevan

=== 3rd place match ===
12 July 2026
18:00

Boxscore

| Kosovo | 86–70 | Moldova |
Scoring by quarter: 16–12, 26–21, 21–21, 23–16

Mika Sport Complex, Yerevan

=== Final ===
12 July 2026
20:30

Boxscore

| Malta | 68–97 | Armenia |
Scoring by quarter: 19–29, 25–24, 14–23, 10–21

Mika Sport Complex, Yerevan

== Final standings ==
| Rank | Team |
|---|---|
| 1st place, gold medalist(s) | Armenia |
| 2nd place, silver medalist(s) | Malta |
| 3rd place, bronze medalist(s) | Kosovo |
| 4 | Moldova |
| 5 | Andorra |
| 6 | Monaco |
| 7 | Albania |
| 8 | Gibraltar |
| 9 | San Marino |
