= 2022 FIBA U16 European Championship Division C =

Tournament details
- Host country: Kosovo
- City: Prizren
- Dates: 12–17 July 2022
- Teams: 8 (from 1 confederation)
- Venue(s): 1 (in 1 host city)

Final positions
- Champions: Andorra (4th title)
- Runners-up: Armenia
- Third place: Albania

Official website
- www.fiba.basketball

The 2022 FIBA U16 European Championship Division C was the 16th edition of the Division C of the FIBA U16 European Championship, the third tier of the European under-16 basketball championship. It was played from 12 to 17 July 2022 in Prizren, Kosovo. Andorra men's national under-16 basketball team won the tournament.

== Participating teams ==
- Albania
- Andorra
- Armenia
- Gibraltar
- Kosovo ▼ (24th place, 2019 FIBA U16 European Championship Division B)
- Malta
- Moldova
- San Marino

== First round ==
The draw of the first round was held on 15 February 2022 in Freising, Germany.

In the first round, the teams were drawn into two groups of four. The first two teams from each group advance to the semifinals; the other teams will play in the 5th–8th place playoffs.

=== Group A ===
Pos	Team	Pld	W	L	PF	PA	PD	Pts	Qualification
1	Kosovo	3	3	0	206	120	+86	6	Semifinals
2	Albania	3	2	1	180	147	+33	5	Semifinals
3	San Marino	3	1	2	129	149	−20	4	5th−8th place playoffs
4	Malta	3	0	3	105	204	−99	3	5th−8th place playoffs

Source: FIBA

12 July 2022

Boxscore

Albania	50–43	San Marino

Sezai Surroi, Prizren

12 July 2022

Boxscore

Malta	28–80	Kosovo

Sezai Surroi, Prizren

13 July 2022

Boxscore

San Marino	59–44	Malta

Sezai Surroi, Prizren

13 July 2022

Boxscore

Kosovo	71–65	Albania

Sezai Surroi, Prizren

14 July 2022

Boxscore

Albania	65–33	Malta

Sezai Surroi, Prizren

14 July 2022

Boxscore

Kosovo	55–27	San Marino

Sezai Surroi, Prizren

=== Group B ===
Pos	Team	Pld	W	L	PF	PA	PD	Pts	Qualification
1	Andorra	3	3	0	277	154	+123	6	Semifinals
2	Armenia	3	2	1	236	228	+8	5	Semifinals
3	Gibraltar	3	1	2	169	222	−53	4	5th−8th place playoffs
4	Moldova	3	0	3	180	258	−78	3	5th−8th place playoffs

Source: FIBA

12 July 2022

Boxscore

Armenia	76–97	Andorra

Sezai Surroi, Prizren

12 July 2022

Boxscore

Gibraltar	72–68	Moldova

Sezai Surroi, Prizren

13 July 2022

Boxscore

Moldova	72–84	Armenia

Sezai Surroi, Prizren

13 July 2022

Boxscore

Andorra	78–38	Gibraltar

Sezai Surroi, Prizren

14 July 2022

Boxscore

Gibraltar	59–76	Armenia

Sezai Surroi, Prizren

14 July 2022

Boxscore

Andorra	102–40	Moldova

Sezai Surroi, Prizren

== 5th−8th place playoffs ==
5th−8th place semifinals
A3	San Marino	56
B4	Moldova	70
B3	Gibraltar	57
A4	Malta	60

5th place match
B4	Moldova	67
A4	Malta	61
7th place match
A3	San Marino	54
B3	Gibraltar	29

=== 5th−8th place semifinals ===
16 July 2022

Boxscore

San Marino	56–70	Moldova

Sezai Surroi, Prizren

16 July 2022

Boxscore

Gibraltar	57–60	Malta

Sezai Surroi, Prizren

=== 7th place match ===
17 July 2022

Boxscore

San Marino	54–29	Gibraltar

Sezai Surroi, Prizren

=== 5th place match ===
17 July 2022

Boxscore

Moldova	67–61	Malta

Sezai Surroi, Prizren

== Championship playoffs ==
Semifinals
A1	Kosovo	58
B2	Armenia	70
B1	Andorra	63
A2	Albania	60

Final
B2	Armenia	65
B1	Andorra	84
3rd place match
A1	Kosovo	53
A2	Albania	68

=== Semifinals ===
16 July 2022

Boxscore

Kosovo	58–70	Armenia

Sezai Surroi, Prizren

16 July 2022

Boxscore

Andorra	63–60	Albania

Sezai Surroi, Prizren

=== 3rd place match ===
17 July 2022

Boxscore

Kosovo	53–68	Albania

Sezai Surroi, Prizren

=== Final ===
17 July 2022

Boxscore

Armenia	65–84	Andorra

Sezai Surroi, Prizren

== Final standings ==
Rank	Team
1st place, gold medalist(s)	Andorra
2nd place, silver medalist(s)	Armenia
3rd place, bronze medalist(s)	Albania
4	Kosovo
5	Moldova
6	Malta
7	San Marino
8	Gibraltar
