= 2016 FIBA U16 European Championship Division C =

Tournament details
- Host country: Cyprus
- City: Nicosia
- Dates: 17–24 July 2016
- Teams: 10 (from 1 confederation)
- Venue: 1 (in 1 host city)

Final positions
- Champions: Cyprus (3rd title)
- Runners-up: Azerbaijan
- Third place: Moldova

Official website
- www.fiba.basketball

The 2016 FIBA U16 European Championship Division C was the 12th edition of the Division C of the FIBA U16 European Championship, the third tier of the European men's under-16 basketball championship. The tournament was played in Nicosia, Cyprus, from 17 to 24 July 2016. Ten teams participated in the competition. Cyprus won their third title in this competition by beating Azerbaijan in the final, 62–50.

== Participating teams ==
- Albania
- Andorra
- Armenia
- Azerbaijan
- Cyprus (hosts)
- Gibraltar
- Malta
- Moldova
- San Marino
- Wales

== First round ==
=== Group A ===
Pos	Team	Pld	W	L	PF	PA	PD	Pts	Team advances to
1	Cyprus	4	4	0	275	189	+86	8	Semifinals
2	Azerbaijan	4	3	1	281	207	+74	7	Semifinals
3	Malta	4	2	2	199	273	−74	6	5th–8th place playoffs
4	San Marino	4	1	3	210	257	−47	5	5th–8th place playoffs
5	Wales	4	0	4	226	265	−39	4	Ninth place game

Source: FIBA
Rules for classification: 1) Points; 2) Head-to-head results; 3) Points difference; 4) Points scored.

17 July

Boxscore

Cyprus	80–28	San Marino

Eleftheria Sports Arena

17 July

Boxscore

Wales	51–75	Azerbaijan

Eleftheria Sports Arena

18 July

Boxscore

Malta	65–63	Wales

Eleftheria Sports Arena

18 July

Boxscore

Azerbaijan	62–63	Cyprus

Eleftheria Sports Arena

19 July

Boxscore

San Marino	60–63	Azerbaijan

Eleftheria Sports Arena

19 July

Boxscore

Cyprus	72–43	Malta

Eleftheria Sports Arena

20 July

Boxscore

Malta	58–57	San Marino

Eleftheria Sports Arena

20 July

Boxscore

Wales	56–60	Cyprus

Eleftheria Sports Arena

21 July

Boxscore

Azerbaijan	81–33	Malta

Eleftheria Sports Arena

21 July

Boxscore

San Marino	65–56	Wales

Eleftheria Sports Arena

=== Group B ===
Pos	Team	Pld	W	L	PF	PA	PD	Pts	Team advances to
1	Moldova	4	4	0	301	193	+108	8	Semifinals
2	Gibraltar	4	2	2	239	253	−14	6	Semifinals
3	Andorra	4	2	2	243	219	+24	6	5th–8th place playoffs
4	Armenia	4	1	3	200	266	−66	5	5th–8th place playoffs
5	Albania	4	1	3	206	258	−52	5	Ninth place game

Source: FIBA
Rules for classification: 1) Points; 2) Head-to-head results; 3) Points difference; 4) Points scored.

17 July

Boxscore

Moldova	81–48	Albania

Eleftheria Sports Arena

17 July

Boxscore

Andorra	71–48	Armenia

Eleftheria Sports Arena

18 July

Boxscore

Gibraltar	66–58	Andorra

Eleftheria Sports Arena

18 July

Boxscore

Armenia	51–75	Moldova

Eleftheria Sports Arena

19 July

Boxscore

Albania	47–57	Armenia

Eleftheria Sports Arena

19 July

Boxscore

Moldova	77–40	Gibraltar

Eleftheria Sports Arena

20 July

Boxscore

Gibraltar	60–74	Albania

Eleftheria Sports Arena

20 July

Boxscore

Andorra	54–68	Moldova

Eleftheria Sports Arena

21 July

Boxscore

Armenia	44–73	Gibraltar

Eleftheria Sports Arena

21 July

Boxscore

Albania	37–60	Andorra

Eleftheria Sports Arena

== Ninth place game ==
24 July

Boxscore

Wales	67–53	Albania

Eleftheria Sports Arena

== 5th–8th place playoffs ==
5th–8th place semifinals
23 July
Malta	87
Armenia	63
23 July
Andorra	67
San Marino	50

Fifth place game
24 July
Malta	72
Andorra	57
Seventh place game
24 July
Armenia	67
San Marino	73

=== 5th–8th place semifinals ===
23 July

Boxscore

Malta	87–63	Armenia

Eleftheria Sports Arena

23 July

Boxscore

Andorra	67–50	San Marino

Eleftheria Sports Arena

=== Seventh place game ===
24 July

Boxscore

Armenia	67–73	San Marino

Eleftheria Sports Arena

=== Fifth place game ===
24 July

Boxscore

Malta	72–57	Andorra

Eleftheria Sports Arena

== Championship playoffs ==
Semifinals
23 July
Cyprus	70
Gibraltar	36
23 July
Moldova	44
Azerbaijan	60

Final
24 July
Cyprus	62
Azerbaijan	50
Third place game
24 July
Gibraltar	56
Moldova	81

=== Semifinals ===
23 July

Boxscore

Cyprus	70–36	Gibraltar

Eleftheria Sports Arena

23 July

Boxscore

Moldova	44–60	Azerbaijan

Eleftheria Sports Arena

=== Third place game ===
24 July

Boxscore

Gibraltar	56–81	Moldova

Eleftheria Sports Arena

=== Final ===
24 July

Boxscore

Cyprus	62–50	Azerbaijan
Scoring by quarter: 25–14, 14–10, 17–15, 6–11

Eleftheria Sports Arena
Attendance: 1500
Referees: Srdan Dozai (CRO), Zdravko Rutesic (MNE), Ventsislav Velikov (BUL)

2016 FIBA Europe Under-16
Championship Division C winners

Cyprus
Third title

== Final standings ==
Rank	Team	Record
1st place, gold medalist(s)	Cyprus	6–0
2nd place, silver medalist(s)	Azerbaijan	4–2
3rd place, bronze medalist(s)	Moldova	5–1
4	Gibraltar	2–4
5	Malta	4–2
6	Andorra	3–3
7	San Marino	2–4
8	Armenia	1–5
9	Wales	1–4
10	Albania	1–4

Promoted to the 2017 FIBA U16 European Championship Division B
