= 2018 FIBA U16 European Championship Division C =

Tournament details
- Host country: San Marino
- City: Serravalle
- Dates: 3–11 July 2018
- Teams: 10 (from 1 confederation)
- Venue(s): 1 (in 1 host city)

Final positions
- Champions: Andorra (3rd title)
- Runners-up: Wales
- Third place: Austria

Official website
- www.fiba.basketball

The 2018 FIBA U16 European Championship Division C was the 14th edition of the Division C of the FIBA U16 European Championship, the third tier of the European men's under-16 basketball championship. It was played in Serravalle, San Marino, from 3 to 11 July 2018. Ten teams participated in the competition. Andorra men's national under-16 basketball team won the tournament.

== Participating teams ==
- Albania
- Andorra
- Austria
- Azerbaijan
- Gibraltar
- Malta
- Moldova
- San Marino (hosts)
- Scotland
- Wales

== First round ==
=== Group A ===
Pos	Team	Pld	W	L	PF	PA	PD	Pts	Qualification
1	Austria	4	4	0	259	157	+102	8	Semifinals
2	San Marino	4	2	2	234	239	−5	6	Semifinals
3	Albania	4	2	2	210	225	−15	6	5th–8th place playoffs
4	Azerbaijan	4	2	2	211	214	−3	6	5th–8th place playoffs
5	Moldova	4	0	4	165	244	−79	4	9th place match

Source: FIBA Europe

3 July 2018

Boxscore

Moldova	43–52	Albania

3 July 2018

Boxscore

San Marino	51–62	Azerbaijan

4 July 2018

Boxscore

Azerbaijan	60–46	Moldova

4 July 2018

Boxscore

Austria	75–50	San Marino

5 July 2018

Boxscore

Albania	66–48	Azerbaijan

5 July 2018

Boxscore

Moldova	29–72	Austria

7 July 2018

Boxscore

Austria	61–37	Albania

7 July 2018

Boxscore

San Marino	60–47	Moldova

8 July 2018

Boxscore

Azerbaijan	41–51	Austria

8 July 2018

Boxscore

Albania	55–73	San Marino

=== Group B ===
Pos	Team	Pld	W	L	PF	PA	PD	Pts	Qualification
1	Wales	4	4	0	260	199	+61	8	Semifinals
2	Andorra	4	3	1	299	217	+82	7	Semifinals
3	Malta	4	2	2	251	243	+8	6	5th–8th place playoffs
4	Scotland	4	1	3	268	214	+54	5	5th–8th place playoffs
5	Gibraltar	4	0	4	122	327	−205	4	9th place match

Source: FIBA Europe

3 July 2018

Boxscore

Malta	60–71	Wales

3 July 2018

Boxscore

Andorra	104–31	Gibraltar

4 July 2018

Boxscore

Gibraltar	41–70	Malta

4 July 2018

Boxscore

Scotland	69–70	Andorra

5 July 2018

Boxscore

Malta	60–56	Scotland

5 July 2018

Boxscore

Wales	68–31	Gibraltar

7 July 2018

Boxscore

Scotland	58–65	Wales

7 July 2018

Boxscore

Andorra	75–61	Malta

8 July 2018

Boxscore

Gibraltar	19–85	Scotland

8 July 2018

Boxscore

Wales	56–50	Andorra

== 9th place match ==
11 July 2018

Boxscore

Moldova	72–57	Gibraltar

== 5th–8th place playoffs ==
5th–8th place semifinals
10 July
Albania	48
Scotland	75
10 July
Malta	45
Azerbaijan	74

5th place match
11 July
Scotland	71
Azerbaijan	62
7th place match
11 July
Albania	65
Malta	70

=== 5th–8th place semifinals ===
10 July 2018

Boxscore

Albania	48–75	Scotland

10 July 2018

Boxscore

Malta	45–74	Azerbaijan

=== 7th place match ===
11 July 2018

Boxscore

Albania	65–70	Malta

=== 5th place match ===
11 July 2018

Boxscore

Scotland	71–62	Azerbaijan

== Championship playoffs ==
Semifinals
10 July
Austria	81
Andorra	86
10 July
Wales	66
San Marino	56

Final
11 July
Andorra	84
Wales	49
3rd place match
11 July
Austria	65
San Marino	43

=== Semifinals ===
10 July 2018

Boxscore

Austria	81–86	Andorra

10 July 2018

Boxscore

Wales	66–56	San Marino

=== 3rd place match ===
11 July 2018

Boxscore

Austria	65–43	San Marino

=== Final ===
11 July 2018

Boxscore

Andorra	84–49	Wales

== Final standings ==
Rank	Team
1st place, gold medalist(s)	Andorra
2nd place, silver medalist(s)	Wales
3rd place, bronze medalist(s)	Austria
4	San Marino
5	Scotland
6	Azerbaijan
7	Malta
8	Albania
9	Moldova
10	Gibraltar

Promoted to the 2019 FIBA U16 European Championship Division B
