= 2009 FIBA Europe Under-16 Championship Division B =

Tournament details
- Host country: Portugal
- Teams: 18

Final positions
- Champions: Bulgaria (1st title)

The 2009 FIBA Europe Under-16 Championship Division B was an international basketball competition held in Portugal in 2009.

== Medalists ==
1. Bulgaria

2. Denmark

3. England

== Final ranking (comparative) ==
1. Slovenia

2. Bulgaria

3. Sweden

4. England

5. Denmark

6. Portugal

7. Romania

8. Finland

9. Hungary

10. Belgium

11. Switzerland

12. Belarus

13. Austria

14. Luxembourg

15. Slovakia

16. (Georgia (country)) Georgia

17. (Republic of Ireland) Ireland

18. Netherlands
