= 2011 FIBA Europe Under-16 Championship Division B =

Tournament details
- Host country: Republic of Macedonia
- City: Strumica
- Dates: 28 July – 7 August 2011
- Teams: 22 (from 1 confederation)
- Venue(s): 3 (in 1 host city)

Final positions
- Champions: Slovenia (1st title)
- Runners-up: England
- Third place: Bosnia and Herzegovina

The 2011 FIBA U16 European Championship Division B was the 8th edition of the Division B of the European basketball championship for national under-16 teams. It was played from 28 July to 7 August 2011 in Strumica, Republic of Macedonia. Slovenia men's national under-16 basketball team won the tournament.

== Participating teams ==
- Armenia
- Austria
- Belgium
- Bosnia and Herzegovina
- Cyprus
- Denmark ▼ (16th place, 2010 FIBA Europe Under-16 Championship Division A)
- England
- Estonia
- Finland
- Georgia
- Hungary
- Ireland
- Israel ▼ (15th place, 2010 FIBA Europe Under-16 Championship Division A)
- Luxembourg
- Macedonia
- Netherlands
- Portugal
- Romania
- Slovakia
- Slovenia
- Sweden
- Switzerland

== Preliminary round ==
In the Preliminary round, the teams were drawn into four groups. The first two teams from each group advance to the quarterfinal groups; the third and fourth teams advance to the 9th–16th place classification groups; the other teams will play in the 17th–22nd place classification groups.

=== Group A ===
Pos	Team	Pld	W	L	PF	PA	PD	Pts	Qualification
1	England	4	4	0	286	225	+61	8	Quarterfinal groups
2	Romania	4	2	2	248	250	−2	6	Quarterfinal groups
3	Luxembourg	4	2	2	279	292	−13	6	9th–16th place classification
4	Georgia	4	2	2	245	269	−24	6	9th–16th place classification
5	Macedonia	4	0	4	259	281	−22	4	17th–22nd place classification

Source: FIBA Archive

28 July 2011

Boxscore

England	73–60	Macedonia

Strumica

28 July 2011

Boxscore

Luxembourg	78–73	Romania

Strumica

29 July 2011

Boxscore

Georgia	70–67	Luxembourg

Strumica

29 July 2011

Boxscore

Romania	43–63	England

Strumica

30 July 2011

Boxscore

Macedonia	62–68	Romania

Strumica

30 July 2011

Boxscore

England	69–58	Georgia

Strumica

31 July 2011

Boxscore

Luxembourg	64–81	England

Strumica

31 July 2011

Boxscore

Georgia	70–69	Macedonia

Strumica

1 August 2011

Boxscore

Romania	64–47	Georgia

Strumica

1 August 2011

Boxscore

Macedonia	68–70	Luxembourg

Strumica

=== Group B ===
Pos	Team	Pld	W	L	PF	PA	PD	Pts	Qualification
1	Slovenia	5	5	0	380	309	+71	10	Quarterfinal groups
2	Netherlands	5	4	1	371	270	+101	9	Quarterfinal groups
3	Portugal	5	3	2	314	272	+42	8	9th–16th place classification
4	Finland	5	2	3	333	320	+13	7	9th–16th place classification
5	Cyprus	5	1	4	282	363	−81	6	17th–22nd place classification
6	Austria	5	0	5	245	391	−146	5	17th–22nd place classification

Source: FIBA Archive

28 July 2011

Boxscore

Cyprus	63–84	Slovenia

Strumica

28 July 2011

Boxscore

Austria	40–61	Finland

Strumica

28 July 2011

Boxscore

Netherlands	68–48	Portugal

Strumica

29 July 2011

Boxscore

Slovenia	95–61	Austria

Strumica

29 July 2011

Boxscore

Portugal	75–43	Cyprus

Strumica

29 July 2011

Boxscore

Finland	65–76	Netherlands

Strumica

30 July 2011

Boxscore

Portugal	51–59	Slovenia

Strumica

30 July 2011

Boxscore

Netherlands	90–48	Austria

Strumica

30 July 2011

Boxscore

Cyprus	57–69	Finland

Strumica

31 July 2011

Boxscore

Slovenia	59–58	Netherlands

Strumica

31 July 2011

Boxscore

Finland	62–64	Portugal

Strumica

31 July 2011

Boxscore

Austria	56–69	Cyprus

Strumica

1 August 2011

Boxscore

Finland	76–83	Slovenia

Strumica

1 August 2011

Boxscore

Cyprus	50–79	Netherlands

Strumica

1 August 2011

Boxscore

Portugal	76–40	Austria

Strumica

=== Group C ===
Pos	Team	Pld	W	L	PF	PA	PD	Pts	Qualification
1	Hungary	5	5	0	361	269	+92	10	Quarterfinal groups
2	Armenia	5	3	2	365	337	+28	8	Quarterfinal groups
3	Switzerland	5	3	2	350	317	+33	8	9th–16th place classification
4	Sweden	5	3	2	409	389	+20	8	9th–16th place classification
5	Ireland	5	1	4	266	339	−73	6	17th–22nd place classification
6	Slovakia	5	0	5	293	393	−100	5	17th–22nd place classification

Source: FIBA Archive

28 July 2011

Boxscore

Armenia	58–78	Hungary

Strumica

28 July 2011

Boxscore

Ireland	51–84	Sweden

Strumica

28 July 2011

Boxscore

Switzerland	74–43	Slovakia

Strumica

29 July 2011

Boxscore

Hungary	69–36	Ireland

Strumica

29 July 2011

Boxscore

Slovakia	52–76	Armenia

Strumica

29 July 2011

Boxscore

Sweden	73–87	Switzerland

Strumica

30 July 2011

Boxscore

Slovakia	48–69	Hungary

Strumica

30 July 2011

Boxscore

Switzerland	65–47	Ireland

Strumica

30 July 2011

Boxscore

Armenia	79–85	Sweden

Strumica

31 July 2011

Boxscore

Hungary	73–61	Switzerland

Strumica

31 July 2011

Boxscore

Sweden	101–100	Slovakia

Strumica

31 July 2011

Boxscore

Ireland	59–71	Armenia

Strumica

1 August 2011

Boxscore

Sweden	66–72	Hungary

Strumica

1 August 2011

Boxscore

Armenia	81–63	Switzerland

Strumica

1 August 2011

Boxscore

Slovakia	50–73	Ireland

Strumica

=== Group D ===
Pos	Team	Pld	W	L	PF	PA	PD	Pts	Qualification
1	Bosnia and Herzegovina	4	4	0	330	262	+68	8	Quarterfinal groups
2	Israel	4	3	1	347	282	+65	7	Quarterfinal groups
3	Belgium	4	2	2	258	271	−13	6	9th–16th place classification
4	Estonia	4	1	3	273	317	−44	5	9th–16th place classification
5	Denmark	4	0	4	217	293	−76	4	17th–22nd place classification

Source: FIBA Archive

28 July 2011

Boxscore

Denmark	42–73	Bosnia and Herzegovina

Strumica

28 July 2011

Boxscore

Estonia	58–59	Belgium

Strumica

29 July 2011

Boxscore

Israel	103–68	Estonia

Strumica

29 July 2011

Boxscore

Belgium	58–53	Denmark

Strumica

30 July 2011

Boxscore

Bosnia and Herzegovina	80–71	Belgium

Strumica

30 July 2011

Boxscore

Denmark	59–80	Israel

Strumica

31 July 2011

Boxscore

Estonia	82–63	Denmark

Strumica

31 July 2011

Boxscore

Israel	84–85	Bosnia and Herzegovina

Strumica

1 August 2011

Boxscore

Belgium	70–80	Israel

Strumica

1 August 2011

Boxscore

Bosnia and Herzegovina	92–65	Estonia

Strumica

== 17th–22nd place classification ==
=== Group I ===
Pos	Team	Pld	W	L	PF	PA	PD	Pts	Qualification
1	Cyprus	2	2	0	154	137	+17	4	17th place match
2	Macedonia	2	1	1	136	139	−3	3	19th place match
3	Austria	2	0	2	110	124	−14	2	21st place match

Source: FIBA Archive

3 August 2011

Boxscore

Austria	54–55	Macedonia

Strumica

4 August 2011

Boxscore

Macedonia	81–85	Cyprus

Strumica

=== Group J ===
Pos	Team	Pld	W	L	PF	PA	PD	Pts	Qualification
1	Denmark	2	1	1	130	113	+17	3	17th place match
2	Ireland	2	1	1	114	110	+4	3	19th place match
3	Slovakia	2	1	1	122	143	−21	3	21st place match

Source: FIBA Archive

3 August 2011

Boxscore

Slovakia	72–70	Denmark

Strumica

4 August 2011

Boxscore

Denmark	60–41	Ireland

Strumica

=== 17th–22nd place playoffs ===
==== 21st place match ====
6 August 2011

Boxscore

Austria	50–47	Slovakia

Strumica

==== 19th place match ====
6 August 2011

Boxscore

Macedonia	65–63	Ireland

Strumica

==== 17th place match ====
7 August 2011

Boxscore

Cyprus	65–103	Denmark

Strumica

== 9th–16th place classification ==
=== Group G ===
Pos	Team	Pld	W	L	PF	PA	PD	Pts	Qualification
1	Portugal	3	3	0	194	155	+39	6	9th–12th place playoffs
2	Finland	3	2	1	214	196	+18	5	9th–12th place playoffs
3	Georgia	3	1	2	191	219	−28	4	13th–16th place playoffs
4	Luxembourg	3	0	3	171	200	−29	3	13th–16th place playoffs

Source: FIBA Archive

3 August 2011

Boxscore

Luxembourg	63–67	Finland

Strumica

3 August 2011

Boxscore

Georgia	52–67	Portugal

Strumica

4 August 2011

Boxscore

Portugal	63–41	Luxembourg

Strumica

4 August 2011

Boxscore

Finland	85–69	Georgia

Strumica

=== Group H ===
Pos	Team	Pld	W	L	PF	PA	PD	Pts	Qualification
1	Belgium	3	3	0	210	158	+52	6	9th–12th place playoffs
2	Estonia	3	1	2	228	224	+4	4	9th–12th place playoffs
3	Switzerland	3	1	2	209	242	−33	4	13th–16th place playoffs
4	Sweden	3	1	2	216	239	−23	4	13th–16th place playoffs

Source: FIBA Archive

3 August 2011

Boxscore

Switzerland	74–90	Estonia

Strumica

3 August 2011

Boxscore

Sweden	52–72	Belgium

Strumica

4 August 2011

Boxscore

Belgium	79–48	Switzerland

Strumica

4 August 2011

Boxscore

Estonia	80–91	Sweden

Strumica

=== 13th–16th place playoffs ===
13th–16th place semifinals
G3	Georgia	53
H4	Sweden	84
H3	Switzerland	91
G4	Luxembourg	81

13th place match
H4	Sweden	68
H3	Switzerland	70
15th place match
G3	Georgia	60
G4	Luxembourg	65

==== 13th–16th place semifinals ====
6 August 2011

Boxscore

Georgia	53–84	Sweden

Strumica

6 August 2011

Boxscore

Switzerland	91–81	Luxembourg

Strumica

==== 15th place match ====
7 August 2011

Boxscore

Georgia	60–65	Luxembourg

Strumica

==== 13th place match ====
7 August 2011

Boxscore

Sweden	68–70	Switzerland

Strumica

=== 9th–12th place playoffs ===
9th–12th place semifinals
G1	Portugal	73
H2	Estonia	49
H1	Belgium	53
G2	Finland	49

9th place match
G1	Portugal	53
H1	Belgium	52
11th place match
H2	Estonia	69
G2	Finland	80

==== 9th–12th place semifinals ====
6 August 2011

Boxscore

Portugal	73–49	Estonia

Strumica

6 August 2011

Boxscore

Belgium	53–49	Finland

Strumica

==== 11th place match ====
7 August 2011

Boxscore

Estonia	69–80	Finland

Strumica

==== 9th place match ====
7 August 2011

Boxscore

Portugal	53–52	Belgium

Strumica

== 1st–8th place classification ==
=== Group E ===
Pos	Team	Pld	W	L	PF	PA	PD	Pts	Qualification
1	England	3	3	0	205	159	+46	6	Semifinals
2	Slovenia	3	2	1	192	170	+22	5	Semifinals
3	Netherlands	3	1	2	209	197	+12	4	5th–8th place playoffs
4	Romania	3	0	3	151	231	−80	3	5th–8th place playoffs

Source: FIBA Archive

3 August 2011

Boxscore

England	79–58	Netherlands

Strumica

3 August 2011

Boxscore

Romania	49–75	Slovenia

Strumica

4 August 2011

Boxscore

Slovenia	58–63	England

Strumica

4 August 2011

Boxscore

Netherlands	93–59	Romania

Strumica

=== Group F ===
Pos	Team	Pld	W	L	PF	PA	PD	Pts	Qualification
1	Bosnia and Herzegovina	3	3	0	249	218	+31	6	Semifinals
2	Israel	3	1	2	238	229	+9	4	Semifinals
3	Hungary	3	1	2	207	221	−14	4	5th–8th place playoffs
4	Armenia	3	1	2	207	233	−26	4	5th–8th place playoffs

Source: FIBA Archive

3 August 2011

Boxscore

Hungary	68–82	Israel

Strumica

3 August 2011

Boxscore

Armenia	73–83	Bosnia and Herzegovina

Strumica

4 August 2011

Boxscore

Bosnia and Herzegovina	81–61	Hungary

Strumica

4 August 2011

Boxscore

Israel	72–76	Armenia

Strumica

=== 5th–8th place playoffs ===
5th–8th place semifinals
E3	Netherlands	71
F4	Armenia	85
F3	Hungary	69
E4	Romania	62

5th place match
F4	Armenia	52
F3	Hungary	65
7th place match
E3	Netherlands	73
E4	Romania	57

==== 5th–8th place semifinals ====
6 August 2011

Boxscore

Netherlands	71–85	Armenia

Strumica

6 August 2011

Boxscore

Hungary	69–62	Romania

Strumica

==== 7th place match ====
7 August 2011

Boxscore

Netherlands	73–57	Romania

Strumica

==== 5th place match ====
7 August 2011

Boxscore

Armenia	52–65	Hungary

Strumica

=== Championship playoffs ===
Semifinals
E1	England	94
F2	Israel	84
F1	Bosnia and Herzegovina	53
E2	Slovenia	74

Final
E1	England	73
E2	Slovenia	82
3rd place match
F2	Israel	71
F1	Bosnia and Herzegovina	72

==== Semifinals ====
6 August 2011

Boxscore

England	94–84	Israel

Strumica

6 August 2011

Boxscore

Bosnia and Herzegovina	53–74	Slovenia

Strumica

==== 3rd place match ====
7 August 2011

Boxscore

Israel	71–72	Bosnia and Herzegovina

Strumica

==== Final ====
7 August 2011

Boxscore

England	73–82	Slovenia

Strumica

== Final standings ==
Rank	Team
1st place, gold medalist(s)	Slovenia
2nd place, silver medalist(s)	England
3rd place, bronze medalist(s)	Bosnia and Herzegovina
4	Israel
5	Hungary
6	Armenia
7	Netherlands
8	Romania
9	Portugal
10	Belgium
11	Finland
12	Estonia
13	Switzerland
14	Sweden
15	Luxembourg
16	Georgia
17	Denmark
18	Cyprus
19	Macedonia
20	Ireland
21	Austria
22	Slovakia

Promoted to the 2012 FIBA Europe Under-16 Championship Division A
