= Malta men's national under-16 basketball team =

Youth national basketball team of Malta

Malta
- FIBA zone: FIBA Europe
- National federation: Malta Basketball Association

U17 World Cup
- Appearances: None

U16 EuroBasket
- Appearances: None

U16 EuroBasket Division B
- Appearances: None

U16 EuroBasket Division C
- Appearances: 18
- Medals: Gold: 1 (2014); Silver: 1 (2026); Bronze: 2 (2000, 2015)

The Malta men's national under-16 basketball team is a national basketball team of Malta, administered by the Malta Basketball Association. It represents the country in under-16 men's international basketball competitions.

The team won four medals at the U16 EuroBasket Division C.

== FIBA U16 EuroBasket participations ==
Year	Result in Division C
2000	3rd place, bronze medalist(s)
2002	5th
2006	4th
2008	6th
2010	6th
2011	4th
2012	6th
2014	1st place, gold medalist(s)
2015	3rd place, bronze medalist(s)

Year	Result in Division C
2016	5th
2017	10th
2018	7th
2019	9th
2022	6th
2023	7th
2024	6th
2025	8th
2026	2nd place, silver medalist(s)

== See also ==
- Malta men's national basketball team
- Malta men's national under-18 basketball team
- Malta women's national under-16 basketball team
