= 2012 FIBA Europe Under-16 Championship Division C =

2012 EuroBasket Under-16
26th FIBA Europe Under-16 Championship

Tournament details
- Host country: Gibraltar
- Dates: 24–29 July 2012
- Teams: 7
- Venue(s): 1 (in 1 host city)

Final positions
- Champions: Monaco (1st title)

Tournament statistics
- MVP: (Monaco) D. Pieper
- Top scorer: (Gibraltar) J. Haefner (18.3)
- Top rebounds: (San Marino) I. Biordi (14.8)
- Top assists: (Monaco) D. Pieper (2.8)
- PPG (Team): Monaco (68.0)
- RPG (Team): Monaco (53.0)
- APG (Team): Scotland (10.5)

Official website
- Official web

The 2012 FIBA U16 European Championship Division C was held in Gibraltar from 24 to 29 July 2012. Seven teams participated in the competition.

== Participating teams ==
- Andorra
- Gibraltar (hosts)
- Malta
- Monaco
- San Marino
- Scotland
- Wales

== Group phase ==
=== Group A ===
Pos	Team	Pld	W	L	PF	PA	PD	Pts	Team advances to
1	Monaco	3	3	0	201	135	+66	6	Semifinals
2	San Marino	3	2	1	155	184	−29	5	Semifinals
3	Malta	3	1	2	161	191	−30	4	5th – 7th place classification
4	Wales	3	0	3	160	167	−7	3	5th – 7th place classification

Source: FIBA Europe

=== Group B ===
Pos	Team	Pld	W	L	PF	PA	PD	Pts	Team advances to
1	Scotland	2	2	0	145	75	+70	4	Semifinals
2	Gibraltar	2	1	1	109	113	−4	3	Semifinals
3	Andorra	2	0	2	77	143	−66	2	5th – 7th place classification

Source: FIBA Europe

== Knockout stage ==
=== Bracket ===
Semifinals
28 July
Monaco	78
Gibraltar	37
28 July
Scotland	72
San Marino	32

Final
29 July
Monaco	61
Scotland	53
Third place
29 July
Gibraltar	50
San Marino	45

=== 5th – 7th place classification ===
Pos	Team	Pld	W	L	PF	PA	PD	Pts
1	Andorra	2	2	0	160	132	+28	4
2	Malta	2	1	1	126	133	−7	3
3	Wales	2	0	2	122	143	−21	2

Source: FIBA Europe

== Final standings ==
Rank	Team	Record
1st place, gold medalist(s)	Monaco	5–0
2nd place, silver medalist(s)	Scotland	3–1
3rd place, bronze medalist(s)	Gibraltar	2–2
4	San Marino	2–3
5	Andorra	2–2
6	Malta	1–3
7	Wales	0–4
