= 2008 FIBA Europe Under-16 Championship Division C =

2008 EuroBasket Under-16
22nd FIBA Europe Under-16 Championship
- Official logo of the U16 European Championship Men 2008 Division C 2008

Tournament details
- Host country: Gibraltar
- Dates: 26 June–1 July 2008
- Teams: 8
- Venue(s): 1 (in 1 host city)

Final positions
- Champions: Scotland (1st title)

Tournament statistics
- Top scorer: (Scotland) A. Fraser (30.0)
- Top rebounds: (Moldova) V. Carali (12.6)
- Top assists: (Scotland) J. Bunyan (6.0)
- PPG (Team): Scotland (99.8)
- RPG (Team): Moldova (60.0)
- APG (Team): Scotland (26.6)

Official website
- Official web

The 2008 FIBA U16 European Championship Division C was held in Gibraltar, from 26 June to 1 July 2008. Eight teams participated in the competition.

== Participating teams ==
- Andorra
- Gibraltar (hosts)
- Malta
- Moldova
- Monaco
- San Marino
- Scotland
- Wales

== Group phase ==
=== Group A ===
Pos	Team	Pld	W	L	PF	PA	PD	Pts	Team advances to
1	Moldova	3	3	0	220	145	+75	6	Semifinals
2	Gibraltar	3	2	1	164	166	−2	5	Semifinals
3	Andorra	3	1	2	208	155	+53	4	5th – 8th place classification
4	San Marino	3	0	3	96	222	−126	3	5th – 8th place classification

Source: FIBA Europe

26 June 2008

Report

Moldova	71–61	Andorra

26 June 2008

Report

Gibraltar	65–27	San Marino

27 June 2008

Report

San Marino	44–64	Moldova

27 June 2008

Report

Andorra	54–59	Gibraltar

28 June 2008

Report

Andorra	93–25	San Marino

28 June 2008

Report

Gibraltar	40–85	Moldova

=== Group B ===
Pos	Team	Pld	W	L	PF	PA	PD	Pts	Team advances to
1	Scotland	3	3	0	294	112	+182	6	Semifinals
2	Wales	3	2	1	200	170	+30	5	Semifinals
3	Malta	3	1	2	98	234	−136	4	5th – 8th place classification
4	Monaco	3	0	3	124	190	−66	3	5th – 8th place classification

Source: FIBA Europe

26 June 2008

Report

Malta	20–78	Wales

26 June 2008

Report

Scotland	83–29	Monaco

27 June 2008

Report

Monaco	42–43	Malta

27 June 2008

Report

Wales	58–97	Scotland

28 June 2008

Report

Scotland	114–25	Malta

28 June 2008

Report

Wales	64–53	Monaco

== Knockout stage ==
=== Bracket ===
Semifinals
30 June
Moldova	55
Wales	68
30 June
Scotland	103
Gibraltar	52

Final
1 July
Wales	39
Scotland	102
Third place
1 July
Moldova	75
Gibraltar	69

5–8th place bracket

5–8th place semifinals
30 June
Andorra	45
Monaco	52
30 June
Malta	49
San Marino	40

Fifth place
1 July
Monaco	73
Malta	51
Seventh place
1 July
Andorra	69
San Marino	36

=== 5th – 8th place classification ===
30 June 2008

Report

Andorra	45–52	Monaco

30 June 2008

Report

Malta	49–40	San Marino

=== Semifinals ===
30 June 2008

Report

Moldova	55–68	Wales

30 June 2008

Report

Scotland	103–52	Gibraltar

=== 7th place game ===
1 July 2008

Report

Andorra	69–36	San Marino

=== 5th place game ===
1 July 2008

Report

Monaco	73–51	Malta

=== 3rd place game ===
1 July 2008

Report

Moldova	75–69	Gibraltar

=== Final ===
1 July 2008

Report

Wales	39–102	Scotland

== Final standings ==
Rank	Team	Record
1st place, gold medalist(s)	Scotland	5–0
2nd place, silver medalist(s)	Wales	3–2
3rd place, bronze medalist(s)	Moldova	4–1
4	Gibraltar	2–3
5	Monaco	2–3
6	Malta	2–3
7	Andorra	2–3
8	San Marino	0–5
