= 2005 FIBA Europe Under-16 Championship Division B =

Tournament details
- Host country: Bulgaria
- Teams: 18

Final positions
- Champions: Germany (1st title)

The 2005 FIBA Europe Under-16 Championship Division B was an international basketball competition held in Bulgaria in 2005.

== Medalists ==
1. Germany

2. Portugal

3. (Georgia (country)) Georgia

== Final ranking ==
1. Germany

2. Estonia

3. England

4. Slovakia

5. Portugal

6. (Georgia (country)) Georgia

7. Cyprus

8. Finland

9. (Republic of Ireland) Ireland

10. Bosnia and Herzegovina

11. Bulgaria

12. Czech Republic

13. (North Macedonia) Macedonia

14. Hungary

15. Romania

16. Netherlands

17. Sweden

18. Austria
