= 2014 FIBA Europe Under-16 Championship Division C =

Tournament details
- Host country: Malta
- City: Valletta
- Dates: 30 June – 5 July 2014
- Teams: 5 (from 1 confederation)
- Venue(s): 1 (in 1 host city)

Final positions
- Champions: Malta (1st title)
- Runners-up: Andorra
- Third place: Wales

Official website
- www.fibaeurope.com

The 2014 FIBA Europe Under-16 Championship Division C was the 10th edition of the Division C of the FIBA U16 European Championship, the third tier of the European men's under-16 basketball championship. It was played in Valletta, Malta, from 30 June to 5 July 2014. The host team, Malta, won the tournament.

== Participating teams ==
- Andorra
- Gibraltar
- Malta
- San Marino
- Wales

== Final standings ==
Pos	Team	Pld	W	L	PF	PA	PD	Pts
1	Malta	4	4	0	259	211	+48	8
2	Andorra	4	2	2	294	230	+64	6
3	Wales	4	2	2	206	224	−18	6
4	Gibraltar	4	2	2	185	211	−26	6
5	San Marino	4	0	4	216	284	−68	4

Source: FIBA Archive

== Results ==
30 June 2014

Boxscore

Gibraltar	36–47	Wales

Ta Qali Sports Pavilion

30 June 2014

Boxscore

Andorra	61–63	Malta

Ta Qali Sports Pavilion

1 July 2014

Boxscore

San Marino	42–48	Gibraltar

Ta Qali Sports Pavilion

1 July 2014

Boxscore

Wales	52–67	Andorra

Ta Qali Sports Pavilion

2 July 2014

Boxscore

Andorra	103–47	San Marino

Ta Qali Sports Pavilion

2 July 2014

Boxscore

Malta	65–46	Wales

Ta Qali Sports Pavilion

4 July 2014

Boxscore

Gibraltar	68–63	Andorra

Ta Qali Sports Pavilion

4 July 2014

Boxscore

San Marino	71–72	Malta

Ta Qali Sports Pavilion

5 July 2014

Boxscore

Wales	61–56	San Marino

Ta Qali Sports Pavilion

5 July 2014

Boxscore

Malta	59–33	Gibraltar

Ta Qali Sports Pavilion
