= Moldova men's national under-16 basketball team =

Moldova
- FIBA zone: FIBA Europe
- National federation: Basketball Federation of Moldova

U17 World Cup
- Appearances: None

U16 EuroBasket
- Appearances: None

U16 EuroBasket Division B
- Appearances: None

U16 EuroBasket Division C
- Appearances: 9
- Medals: Bronze: 2 (2008, 2016)

The Moldova men's national under-16 basketball team is a national basketball team of Moldova, administered by the Basketball Federation of Moldova. It represents the country in under-16 men's international basketball competitions.

The team won two bronze medals at the FIBA U16 EuroBasket Division C.

== FIBA U16 EuroBasket participations ==
Year	Result in Division C
2008	3rd place, bronze medalist(s)
2016	3rd place, bronze medalist(s)
2017	8th
2018	9th
2019	6th
2022	5th
2024	7th
2025	6th
2026	4th

== See also ==
- Moldova men's national basketball team
- Moldova men's national under-18 basketball team
- Moldova women's national under-16 basketball team
