= 2016 FIBA U16 Women's European Championship Division C =

Tournament details
- Host country: Andorra
- City: Andorra la Vella
- Dates: 18–23 July 2016
- Teams: 6 (from 1 confederation)
- Venue(s): 1 (in 1 host city)

Final positions
- Champions: Georgia (1st title)
- Runners-up: Andorra
- Third place: Malta

Official website
- www.fiba.basketball

The 2016 FIBA U16 Women's European Championship Division C was the 12th edition of the Division C of the FIBA U16 Women's European Championship, the third tier of the European women's under-16 basketball championship. It was played in Andorra la Vella, Andorra, from 18 to 23 July 2016. Georgia women's national under-16 basketball team won the tournament.

== Participating teams ==
- Andorra
- Georgia
- Gibraltar
- Kosovo
- Malta
- Wales

== First round ==
=== Group A ===
Pos	Team	Pld	W	L	PF	PA	PD	Pts	Qualification
1	Kosovo	2	2	0	100	97	+3	4	Semifinals
2	Malta	2	1	1	111	78	+33	3	Quarterfinals
3	Wales	2	0	2	60	96	−36	2	Quarterfinals

Source: FIBA

18 July 2016

Boxscore

Wales	40–42	Kosovo

Poliesportiu Sports Hall

19 July 2016

Boxscore

Kosovo	58–57	Malta

Poliesportiu Sports Hall

20 July 2016

Boxscore

Malta	54–20	Wales

Poliesportiu Sports Hall

=== Group B ===
Pos	Team	Pld	W	L	PF	PA	PD	Pts	Qualification
1	Georgia	2	2	0	116	84	+32	4	Semifinals
2	Andorra	2	1	1	99	78	+21	3	Quarterfinals
3	Gibraltar	2	0	2	69	122	−53	2	Quarterfinals

Source: FIBA

18 July 2016

Boxscore

Gibraltar	46–61	Georgia

Poliesportiu Sports Hall

19 July 2016

Boxscore

Georgia	55–38	Andorra

Poliesportiu Sports Hall

20 July 2016

Boxscore

Andorra	61–23	Gibraltar

Poliesportiu Sports Hall

== Playoffs ==
Quarterfinals
A2	Malta	70
B3	Gibraltar	41
B2	Andorra	57
A3	Wales	18

Semifinals
B1	Georgia	67
A2	Malta	47
A1	Kosovo	32
B2	Andorra	59
5th place match
B3	Gibraltar	41
A3	Wales	24

Final
B1	Georgia	54
B2	Andorra	35
3rd place match
A2	Malta	61
A1	Kosovo	28

=== Quarterfinals ===
21 July 2016

Boxscore

Malta	70–41	Gibraltar

Poliesportiu Sports Hall

21 July 2016

Boxscore

Andorra	57–18	Wales

Poliesportiu Sports Hall

=== Semifinals ===
22 July 2016

Boxscore

Georgia	67–47	Malta

Poliesportiu Sports Hall

22 July 2016

Boxscore

Kosovo	32–59	Andorra

Poliesportiu Sports Hall

=== 5th place match ===
23 July 2016

Boxscore

Gibraltar	41–24	Wales

Poliesportiu Sports Hall

=== 3rd place match ===
23 July 2016

Boxscore

Malta	61–28	Kosovo

Poliesportiu Sports Hall

=== Final ===
23 July 2016

Boxscore

Georgia	54–35	Andorra

Poliesportiu Sports Hall

== Final standings ==
Rank	Team
1st place, gold medalist(s)	Georgia
2nd place, silver medalist(s)	Andorra
3rd place, bronze medalist(s)	Malta
4	Kosovo
5	Gibraltar
6	Wales
