= 2011 FIBA Europe Under-16 Championship for Women Division C =

Tournament details
- Host country: Andorra
- City: Andorra la Vella
- Dates: 25–30 July 2011
- Teams: 6 (from 1 confederation)
- Venue(s): 1 (in 1 host city)

Final positions
- Champions: Andorra (1st title)
- Runners-up: Cyprus
- Third place: Malta

The 2011 FIBA Europe Under-16 Championship for Women Division C was the 7th edition of the Division C of the FIBA U16 Women's European Championship, the third tier of the European women's under-16 basketball championship. It was played in Andorra la Vella, Andorra, from 25 to 30 July 2011. Andorra women's national under-16 basketball team won the tournament.

== Participating teams ==
- Andorra
- Cyprus
- Gibraltar
- Malta
- Monaco
- Wales

== First round ==
=== Group A ===
Pos	Team	Pld	W	L	PF	PA	PD	Pts	Qualification
1	Andorra	2	2	0	140	36	+104	4	Semifinals
2	Malta	2	1	1	87	92	−5	3	Quarterfinals
3	Wales	2	0	2	39	138	−99	2	Quarterfinals

Source: FIBA Archive

25 July 2011

Boxscore

Andorra	66–23	Malta

26 July 2011

Boxscore

Malta	64–26	Wales

27 July 2011

Boxscore

Wales	13–74	Andorra

=== Group B ===
Pos	Team	Pld	W	L	PF	PA	PD	Pts	Qualification
1	Cyprus	2	2	0	0	0	0	4	Semifinals
2	Monaco	2	1	1	0	0	0	3	Quarterfinals
3	Gibraltar	2	0	2	0	0	0	2	Quarterfinals

Source: FIBA Archive

25 July 2011

Boxscore

Monaco	36–52	Cyprus

26 July 2011

Boxscore

Cyprus	60–25	Gibraltar

27 July 2011

Boxscore

Gibraltar	48–53	Monaco

== Playoffs ==
Quarterfinals
A2	Malta	52
B3	Gibraltar	26
B2	Monaco	70
A3	Wales	25

Semifinals
B1	Cyprus	39
A2	Malta	14
A1	Andorra	63
B2	Monaco	40
5th place match
B3	Gibraltar	74
A3	Wales	23

Final
B1	Cyprus	49
A1	Andorra	61
3rd place match
A2	Malta	49
B2	Monaco	45

=== Quarterfinals ===
28 July 2011

Boxscore

Malta	52–26	Gibraltar

28 July 2011

Boxscore

Monaco	70–25	Wales

=== Semifinals ===
29 July 2011

Boxscore

Cyprus	39–14	Malta

29 July 2011

Boxscore

Andorra	63–40	Monaco

=== 5th place match ===
30 July 2011

Boxscore

Gibraltar	74–23	Wales

=== 3rd place match ===
30 July 2011

Boxscore

Malta	49–45	Monaco

=== Final ===
30 July 2011

Boxscore

Cyprus	49–61	Andorra

== Final standings ==
Rank	Team
1st place, gold medalist(s)	Andorra
2nd place, silver medalist(s)	Cyprus
3rd place, bronze medalist(s)	Malta
4	Monaco
5	Gibraltar
6	Wales
