= 2018 FIBA U16 Women's European Championship Division C =

Tournament details
- Host country: Moldova
- City: Chișinău
- Dates: 3–8 July 2018
- Teams: 8 (from 1 confederation)
- Venue(s): 1 (in 1 host city)

Final positions
- Champions: Austria (1st title)
- Runners-up: Scotland
- Third place: Georgia

Official website
- www.fiba.basketball

The 2018 FIBA U16 Women's European Championship Division C was the 14th edition of the Division C of the FIBA U16 Women's European Championship, the third tier of the European women's under-16 basketball championship. It was played in Chișinău, Moldova, from 3 to 8 July 2018. Austria women's national under-16 basketball team won the tournament.

== Participating teams ==
- Austria
- Georgia
- Gibraltar
- Malta
- Moldova
- Monaco
- Scotland
- Wales

== First round ==
=== Group A ===
Pos	Team	Pld	W	L	PF	PA	PD	Pts	Qualification
1	Austria	3	3	0	260	97	+163	6	Semifinals
2	Georgia	3	1	2	164	177	−13	4	Semifinals
3	Malta	3	1	2	138	215	−77	4	5th–8th place playoffs
4	Monaco	3	1	2	132	205	−73	4	5th–8th place playoffs

Source: FIBA

3 July 2018

Boxscore

Austria	111–22	Malta

Sports Complex Futsal Arena FMF

3 July 2018

Boxscore

Monaco	40–77	Georgia

Sports Complex Futsal Arena FMF

4 July 2018

Boxscore

Malta	59–66	Monaco

Sports Complex Futsal Arena FMF

4 July 2018

Boxscore

Georgia	49–80	Austria

Sports Complex Futsal Arena FMF

5 July 2018

Boxscore

Georgia	38–57	Malta

Sports Complex Futsal Arena FMF

5 July 2018

Boxscore

Austria	69–26	Monaco

Sports Complex Futsal Arena FMF

=== Group B ===
Pos	Team	Pld	W	L	PF	PA	PD	Pts	Qualification
1	Scotland	3	3	0	189	135	+54	6	Semifinals
2	Moldova	3	1	2	163	155	+8	4	Semifinals
3	Wales	3	1	2	135	147	−12	4	5th–8th place playoffs
4	Gibraltar	3	1	2	117	167	−50	4	5th–8th place playoffs

Source: FIBA

3 July 2018

Boxscore

Scotland	61–48	Wales

Sports Complex Futsal Arena FMF

3 July 2018

Boxscore

Moldova	62–45	Gibraltar

Sports Complex Futsal Arena FMF

4 July 2018

Boxscore

Gibraltar	34–71	Scotland

Sports Complex Futsal Arena FMF

4 July 2018

Boxscore

Wales	53–48	Moldova

Sports Complex Futsal Arena FMF

5 July 2018

Boxscore

Gibraltar	38–34	Wales

Sports Complex Futsal Arena FMF

5 July 2018

Boxscore

Scotland	57–53	Moldova

Sports Complex Futsal Arena FMF

== 5th–8th place playoffs ==
5th–8th place semifinals
A3	Malta	56
B4	Gibraltar	25
B3	Wales	51
A4	Monaco	46

5th place match
A3	Malta	47
B3	Wales	43
7th place match
B4	Gibraltar	21
A4	Monaco	82

=== 5th–8th place semifinals ===
7 July 2018

Boxscore

Malta	56–25	Gibraltar

Sports Complex Futsal Arena FMF

7 July 2018

Boxscore

Wales	51–46	Monaco

Sports Complex Futsal Arena FMF

=== 7th place match ===
8 July 2018

Boxscore

Gibraltar	21–82	Monaco

Sports Complex Futsal Arena FMF

=== 5th place match ===
8 July 2018

Boxscore

Malta	47–43	Wales

Sports Complex Futsal Arena FMF

== Championship playoffs ==
Semifinals
A1	Austria	82
B2	Moldova	37
B1	Scotland	63
A2	Georgia	57

Final
A1	Austria	69
B1	Scotland	48
3rd place match
B2	Moldova	50
A2	Georgia	51

=== Semifinals ===
7 July 2018

Boxscore

Austria	82–37	Moldova

Sports Complex Futsal Arena FMF

7 July 2018

Boxscore

Scotland	63–57	Georgia

Sports Complex Futsal Arena FMF

=== 3rd place match ===
8 July 2018

Boxscore

Moldova	50–51	Georgia

Sports Complex Futsal Arena FMF

=== Final ===
8 July 2018

Boxscore

Austria	69–48	Scotland

Sports Complex Futsal Arena FMF

== Final standings ==
Rank	Team
1st place, gold medalist(s)	Austria
2nd place, silver medalist(s)	Scotland
3rd place, bronze medalist(s)	Georgia
4	Moldova
5	Malta
6	Wales
7	Monaco
8	Gibraltar

Promoted to the 2019 FIBA U16 Women's European Championship Division B
