= 2004 Under-16 European Promotion Cup for Women =

Tournament details
- Host country: Andorra
- City: Andorra la Vella
- Dates: 20–24 July 2004
- Teams: 5 (from 1 confederation)
- Venue(s): 1 (in 1 host city)

Final positions
- Champions: Luxembourg (2nd title)
- Runners-up: Scotland
- Third place: Andorra

The 2004 Under-16 European Promotion Cup for Women was the third edition of the basketball European Promotion Cup for U16 women's teams, today known as the FIBA U16 Women's European Championship Division C. It was played in Andorra la Vella, Andorra, from 20 to 24 July 2004. Luxembourg women's national under-16 basketball team won the tournament.

== Participating teams ==
- Andorra
- Gibraltar
- Luxembourg
- Scotland
- Wales

== Final standings ==
Pos	Team	Pld	W	L	PF	PA	PD	Pts
1	Luxembourg	4	4	0	367	99	+268	8
2	Scotland	4	3	1	284	148	+136	7
3	Andorra	4	2	2	164	225	−61	6
4	Gibraltar	4	1	3	127	311	−184	5
5	Wales	4	0	4	118	277	−159	4

Source: FIBA Archive

== Results ==
20 July 2004

Boxscore

Scotland	35–64	Luxembourg

20 July 2004

Boxscore

Wales	31–48	Andorra

21 July 2004

Boxscore

Gibraltar	23–85	Scotland

21 July 2004

Boxscore

Luxembourg	86–26	Wales

22 July 2004

Boxscore

Wales	37–51	Gibraltar

22 July 2004

Boxscore

Andorra	28–79	Luxembourg

23 July 2004

Boxscore

Scotland	92–24	Wales

23 July 2004

Boxscore

Gibraltar	43–51	Andorra

24 July 2004

Boxscore

Luxembourg	138–10	Gibraltar

24 July 2004

Boxscore

Andorra	37–72	Scotland
