= 2019 FIBA U16 Women's European Championship Division C =

Tournament details
- Host country: Moldova
- City: Chișinău
- Dates: 16–21 July 2019
- Teams: 7 (from 1 confederation)
- Venue(s): 1 (in 1 host city)

Final positions
- Champions: Cyprus (3rd title)
- Runners-up: Georgia
- Third place: Scotland

Official website
- www.fiba.basketball

The 2019 FIBA U16 Women's European Championship Division C was the 15th edition of the Division C of the FIBA U16 Women's European Championship, the third tier of the European women's under-16 basketball championship. It was played in Chișinău, Moldova, from 16 to 21 July 2019. Cyprus women's national under-16 basketball team won the tournament.

== Participating teams ==
- Cyprus
- Georgia
- Gibraltar
- Malta
- Moldova
- Scotland
- Wales

== First round ==
=== Group A ===
Pos	Team	Pld	W	L	PF	PA	PD	Pts	Qualification
1	Georgia	2	2	0	144	72	+72	4	Semifinals
2	Moldova	2	1	1	99	107	−8	3	Semifinals
3	Gibraltar	2	0	2	71	135	−64	2	5th–7th place classification

Source: FIBA

16 July 2019

Boxscore

Georgia	71–37	Moldova

Sports Complex Futsal Arena FMF

17 July 2019

Boxscore

Moldova	62–36	Gibraltar

Sports Complex Futsal Arena FMF

18 July 2019

Boxscore

Gibraltar	35–73	Georgia

Sports Complex Futsal Arena FMF

=== Group B ===
Pos	Team	Pld	W	L	PF	PA	PD	Pts	Qualification
1	Cyprus	3	3	0	181	136	+45	6	Semifinals
2	Scotland	3	2	1	169	163	+6	5	Semifinals
3	Wales	3	1	2	161	160	+1	4	5th–7th place classification
4	Malta	3	0	3	136	188	−52	3	5th–7th place classification

Source: FIBA

16 July 2019

Boxscore

Scotland	45–64	Cyprus

Sports Complex Futsal Arena FMF

16 July 2019

Boxscore

Malta	47–60	Wales

Sports Complex Futsal Arena FMF

17 July 2019

Boxscore

Cyprus	65–40	Malta

Sports Complex Futsal Arena FMF

17 July 2019

Boxscore

Wales	50–61	Scotland

Sports Complex Futsal Arena FMF

18 July 2019

Boxscore

Wales	51–52	Cyprus

Sports Complex Futsal Arena FMF

18 July 2019

Boxscore

Scotland	63–49	Malta

Sports Complex Futsal Arena FMF

== 5th–7th place classification ==
=== Group C ===
Pos	Team	Pld	W	L	PF	PA	PD	Pts
5	Wales	2	2	0	118	76	+42	4
6	Malta	2	1	1	105	77	+28	3
7	Gibraltar	2	0	2	46	116	−70	2

Source: FIBA

20 July 2019

Boxscore

Malta	58–17	Gibraltar

Sports Complex Futsal Arena FMF

21 July 2019

Boxscore

Gibraltar	29–58	Wales

Sports Complex Futsal Arena FMF

== Championship playoffs ==
Semifinals
A1	Georgia	65
B2	Scotland	63
B1	Cyprus	80
A2	Moldova	37

Final
A1	Georgia	38
B1	Cyprus	75
3rd place match
B2	Scotland	76
A2	Moldova	35

=== Semifinals ===
20 July 2019

Boxscore

Cyprus	80–37	Moldova

Sports Complex Futsal Arena FMF

20 July 2019

Boxscore

Georgia	65–63	Scotland

Sports Complex Futsal Arena FMF

=== 3rd place match ===
21 July 2019

Boxscore

Scotland	76–35	Moldova

Sports Complex Futsal Arena FMF

=== Final ===
21 July 2019

Boxscore

Georgia	38–75	Cyprus

Sports Complex Futsal Arena FMF

== Final standings ==
Rank	Team
1st place, gold medalist(s)	Cyprus
2nd place, silver medalist(s)	Georgia
3rd place, bronze medalist(s)	Scotland
4	Moldova
5	Wales
6	Malta
7	Gibraltar
