= 2012 FIBA Europe Under-16 Championship for Women Division C =

Tournament details
- Host country: Gibraltar
- Dates: 17–22 July 2012
- Teams: 8 (from 1 confederation)
- Venue(s): 1 (in 1 host city)

Final positions
- Champions: Iceland (2nd title)
- Runners-up: Cyprus
- Third place: Scotland

The 2012 FIBA Europe Under-16 Championship for Women Division C was the 8th edition of the Division C of the FIBA U16 Women's European Championship, the third tier of the European women's under-16 basketball championship. It was played in Gibraltar from 17 to 22 July 2012. Iceland women's national under-16 basketball team won the tournament.

== Participating teams ==
- Andorra
- Cyprus
- Gibraltar
- Iceland
- Malta
- Monaco
- Scotland
- Wales

== First round ==
=== Group A ===
Pos	Team	Pld	W	L	PF	PA	PD	Pts	Qualification
1	Iceland	3	3	0	218	85	+133	6	Semifinals
2	Cyprus	3	2	1	166	114	+52	5	Semifinals
3	Monaco	3	1	2	112	159	−47	4	5th–8th place playoffs
4	Wales	3	0	3	56	194	−138	3	5th–8th place playoffs

Source: FIBA Archive

17 July 2012

Boxscore

Monaco	55–23	Wales

17 July 2012

Boxscore

Iceland	66–43	Cyprus

18 July 2012

Boxscore

Iceland	88–30	Monaco

18 July 2012

Boxscore

Cyprus	75–21	Wales

19 July 2012

Boxscore

Wales	12–64	Iceland

19 July 2012

Boxscore

Monaco	27–48	Cyprus

=== Group B ===
Pos	Team	Pld	W	L	PF	PA	PD	Pts	Qualification
1	Scotland	3	3	0	161	128	+33	6	Semifinals
2	Gibraltar	3	2	1	145	138	+7	5	Semifinals
3	Malta	3	1	2	155	152	+3	4	5th–8th place playoffs
4	Andorra	3	0	3	100	143	−43	3	5th–8th place playoffs

Source: FIBA Archive

17 July 2012

Boxscore

Scotland	57–34	Andorra

17 July 2012

Boxscore

Malta	58–62	Gibraltar

18 July 2012

Boxscore

Scotland	53–49	Malta

18 July 2012

Boxscore

Andorra	29–38	Gibraltar

19 July 2012

Boxscore

Malta	48–37	Andorra

19 July 2012

Boxscore

Gibraltar	45–51	Scotland

== 5th–8th place playoffs ==
5th–8th place semifinals
A3	Monaco	42
B4	Andorra	49
B3	Malta	67
A4	Wales	38

5th place match
B4	Andorra	45
B3	Malta	34
7th place match
A3	Monaco	38
A4	Wales	27

=== 5th–8th place semifinals ===
21 July 2012

Boxscore

Monaco	42–49	Andorra

21 July 2012

Boxscore

Malta	67–38	Wales

=== 7th place match ===
22 July 2012

Boxscore

Monaco	38–27	Wales

=== 5th place match ===
22 July 2012

Boxscore

Andorra	45–34	Malta

== Championship playoffs ==
Semifinals
A1	Iceland	107
B2	Gibraltar	20
B1	Scotland	39
A2	Cyprus	62

Final
A1	Iceland	57
A2	Cyprus	44
3rd place match
B2	Gibraltar	29
B1	Scotland	62

=== Semifinals ===
21 July 2012

Boxscore

Scotland	39–62	Cyprus

21 July 2012

Boxscore

Iceland	107–20	Gibraltar

=== 3rd place match ===
22 July 2012

Boxscore

Gibraltar	29–62	Scotland

=== Final ===
22 July 2012

Boxscore

Iceland	57–44	Cyprus

== Final standings ==
Rank	Team
1st place, gold medalist(s)	Iceland
2nd place, silver medalist(s)	Cyprus
3rd place, bronze medalist(s)	Scotland
4	Gibraltar
5	Andorra
6	Malta
7	Monaco
8	Wales
