= Wales men's national under-16 basketball team =

Wales
- FIBA zone: FIBA Europe
- National federation: Basketball Wales

U17 World Cup
- Appearances: None

U16 EuroBasket
- Appearances: 1 (1975)
- Medals: None

U16 EuroBasket Division B
- Appearances: None

U16 EuroBasket Division C
- Appearances: 14
- Medals: Silver: 2 (2008, 2018); Bronze: 3 (2011, 2014, 2019)

The Wales men's national under-16 basketball team is a national basketball team of Wales, administered by Basketball Wales. It represents the country in international under-16 men's basketball competitions.

The team finished 20th at the 1975 European Championship for Cadets. They also won five medals at the FIBA U16 EuroBasket Division C.

== FIBA U16 EuroBasket participations ==
Year	Division A	Division B	Division C
1975	20th		
2000			4th
2004			4th
2006			7th
2008			2nd place, silver medalist(s)
2010			5th
2011			3rd place, bronze medalist(s)
2012			7th

Year	Division C
2013	4th
2014	3rd place, bronze medalist(s)
2015	4th
2016	9th
2017	7th
2018	2nd place, silver medalist(s)
2019	3rd place, bronze medalist(s)

== See also ==
- Wales men's national basketball team
- Wales men's national under-18 basketball team
- Wales women's national under-16 basketball team
