= 2013 FIBA Europe Under-16 Championship for Women Division C =

Tournament details
- Host country: Gibraltar
- Dates: 2–7 July 2013
- Teams: 5 (from 1 confederation)
- Venue(s): 1 (in 1 host city)

Final positions
- Champions: Cyprus (2nd title)
- Runners-up: Scotland
- Third place: Monaco

The 2013 FIBA Europe Under-16 Championship for Women Division C was the 9th edition of the Division C of the FIBA U16 Women's European Championship, the third tier of the European women's under-16 basketball championship. It was played in Gibraltar from 2 to 7 July 2013. Cyprus women's national under-16 basketball team won the tournament.

== Participating teams ==
- Cyprus
- Gibraltar
- Monaco
- Scotland
- Wales

== Final standings ==
Pos	Team	Pld	W	L	PF	PA	PD	Pts
1	Cyprus	4	4	0	282	122	+160	8
2	Scotland	4	3	1	256	180	+76	7
3	Monaco	4	2	2	201	235	−34	6
4	Gibraltar	4	1	3	160	247	−87	5
5	Wales	4	0	4	144	259	−115	4

Source: FIBA Archive

== Results ==
2 July 2013

Boxscore

Scotland	73–34	Wales

2 July 2013

Boxscore

Monaco	36–79	Cyprus

3 July 2013

Boxscore

Wales	45–57	Monaco

3 July 2013

Boxscore

Gibraltar	41–74	Scotland

4 July 2013

Boxscore

Cyprus	74–24	Wales

4 July 2013

Boxscore

Monaco	70–42	Gibraltar

6 July 2013

Boxscore

Scotland	69–38	Monaco

6 July 2013

Boxscore

Gibraltar	22–62	Cyprus

7 July 2013

Boxscore

Cyprus	67–40	Scotland

7 July 2013

Boxscore

Wales	41–55	Gibraltar
