= 2016 FIBA U16 European Championship Division B =

Tournament details
- Host country: Bulgaria
- City: Sofia
- Dates: 11–20 August
- Teams: 24 (from 1 confederation)
- Venue: 3 (in 1 host city)

Final positions
- Champions: Russia (1st title)
- Runners-up: Israel
- Third place: Slovenia
- Fourth place: Ukraine

Tournament statistics
- MVP: (Russia) Alexander Shashkov
- Top scorer: (Luxembourg) Ben Kovac (23.3 ppg)

Official website
- www.fiba.basketball

The 2016 FIBA U16 European Championship Division B was played in Sofia, Bulgaria, from 11 to 20 August 2016. 24 teams participated in the competition. Russia won the tournament for the first time, with Israel finishing second.

== Participating teams ==
- Austria
- Belarus
- Belgium
- Bulgaria
- Czech Republic
- Denmark
- England ▼ (14th place, 2015 FIBA Europe Under-16 Championship Division A)
- Georgia
- Hungary
- Iceland
- Ireland
- Israel ▼ (15th place, 2015 FIBA Europe Under-16 Championship Division A)
- Kosovo
- Luxembourg
- Macedonia
- Netherlands
- Norway
- Portugal
- Romania
- Russia ▼ (suspended from 2015 FIBA Europe Under-16 Championship Division A)
- Scotland
- Slovakia
- Slovenia
- Ukraine

== First round ==
=== Group A ===
Pos	Team	Pld	W	L	PF	PA	PD	Pts	Team advances to
1	Russia	5	4	1	344	296	+48	9	Quarterfinals
2	Belarus	5	4	1	331	290	+41	9	Quarterfinals
3	Netherlands	5	3	2	338	273	+65	8	9th – 16th place playoffs
4	Portugal	5	3	2	310	268	+42	8	9th – 16th place playoffs
5	Denmark	5	1	4	281	362	−81	6	17th – 24th place playoffs
6	Luxembourg	5	0	5	273	388	−115	5	17th – 24th place playoffs

Source: FIBA.com
Rules for classification: 1) Points; 2) Head-to-head results; 3) Points difference; 4) Points scored.

=== Group B ===
Pos	Team	Pld	W	L	PF	PA	PD	Pts	Team advances to
1	Israel	5	5	0	406	283	+123	10	Quarterfinals
2	England	5	4	1	341	272	+69	9	Quarterfinals
3	Hungary	5	3	2	356	298	+58	8	9th – 16th place playoffs
4	Macedonia	5	2	3	324	318	+6	7	9th – 16th place playoffs
5	Ireland	5	1	4	309	346	−37	6	17th – 24th place playoffs
6	Scotland	5	0	5	222	441	−219	5	17th – 24th place playoffs

Source: FIBA.com
Rules for classification: 1) Points; 2) Head-to-head results; 3) Points difference; 4) Points scored.

=== Group C ===
Pos	Team	Pld	W	L	PF	PA	PD	Pts	Team advances to
1	Slovenia	5	5	0	381	275	+106	10	Quarterfinals
2	Ukraine	5	4	1	343	262	+81	9	Quarterfinals
3	Romania	5	3	2	353	300	+53	8	9th – 16th place playoffs
4	Kosovo	5	2	3	287	333	−46	7	9th – 16th place playoffs
5	Norway	5	1	4	272	363	−91	6	17th – 24th place playoffs
6	Austria	5	0	5	251	354	−103	5	17th – 24th place playoffs

Source: FIBA.com
Rules for classification: 1) Points; 2) Head-to-head results; 3) Points difference; 4) Points scored.

=== Group D ===
Pos	Team	Pld	W	L	PF	PA	PD	Pts	Team advances to
1	Czech Republic	5	4	1	358	330	+28	9	Quarterfinals
2	Belgium	5	4	1	336	274	+62	9	Quarterfinals
3	Slovakia	5	3	2	321	346	−25	8	9th – 16th place playoffs
4	Georgia	5	2	3	360	354	+6	7	9th – 16th place playoffs
5	Bulgaria	5	1	4	398	413	−15	6	17th – 24th place playoffs
6	Iceland	5	1	4	336	392	−56	6	17th – 24th place playoffs

Source: FIBA.com
Rules for classification: 1) Points; 2) Head-to-head results; 3) Points difference; 4) Points scored.

== 17th–24th place playoffs ==
21st-place match
C6	Austria	67
D6	Iceland	87
23rd-place match
B6	Scotland	59
A6	Luxembourg	68

21st – 24th place semifinals
B6	Scotland	45
C6	Austria	74
A6	Luxembourg	66
D6	Iceland	73

17th – 24th place quarterfinals
A5	Denmark	77
B6	Scotland	58
D5	Bulgaria	76
C6	Austria	63
B5	Ireland	76
A6	Luxembourg	74
C5	Norway	62
D6	Iceland	48

17th – 20th place semifinals
A5	Denmark	80
D5	Bulgaria	87
B5	Ireland	64
C5	Norway	73

17th-place match
D5	Bulgaria	77
C5	Norway	58
19th-place match
A5	Denmark	81
B5	Ireland	71

== 9th–16th place playoffs ==
13th-place match
C4	Kosovo	46
B3	Hungary	80
15th-place match
B4	Macedonia	77
C3	Romania	88

13th – 16th place semifinals
B4	Macedonia	66
C4	Kosovo	68
B3	Hungary	86
C3	Romania	61

9th – 16th place quarterfinals
A3	Netherlands	65
B4	Macedonia	58
D3	Slovakia	61
C4	Kosovo	50
B3	Hungary	58
A4	Portugal	65
C3	Romania	79
D4	Georgia	87

9th – 12th place semifinals
A3	Netherlands	51
D3	Slovakia	56
A4	Portugal	79
D4	Georgia	62

9th-place match
D3	Slovakia	45
A4	Portugal	56
11th-place match
A3	Netherlands	69
D4	Georgia	47

== Championship playoffs ==
Fifth place
B2	England	72
A2	Belarus	53
Seventh place
D1	Czech Republic	64
D2	Belgium	75

Consolation semifinals
B2	England	64
D1	Czech Republic	63
A2	Belarus	71
D2	Belgium	68

Quarterfinals
A1	Russia	62
B2	England	61
D1	Czech Republic	50
C2	Ukraine	80
B1	Israel	84
A2	Belarus	69
C1	Slovenia	83
D2	Belgium	81

Semifinals
A1	Russia	69
C2	Ukraine	55
B1	Israel	83
C1	Slovenia	71

Final
A1	Russia	82
B1	Israel	76
Third place
C2	Ukraine	71
C1	Slovenia	79

== Final standings ==
Rank	Team
1st place, gold medalist(s)	Russia
2nd place, silver medalist(s)	Israel
3rd place, bronze medalist(s)	Slovenia
4th	Ukraine
5th	England
6th	Belarus
7th	Belgium
8th	Czech Republic
9th	Portugal
10th	Slovakia
11th	Netherlands
12th	Georgia
13th	Hungary
14th	Kosovo
15th	Romania
16th	Macedonia
17th	Bulgaria
18th	Norway
19th	Denmark
20th	Ireland
21st	Iceland
22nd	Austria
23rd	Luxembourg
24th	Scotland

Team is promoted to the 2017 FIBA U16 European Championship Division A

== Awards ==
Most Valuable Player

- (Russia) Alexander Shashkov

All-Tournament Team

- (Russia) Alexander Shashkov
- (Russia) Konstantin Shevchuk
- (Israel) Eidan Alber
- (Ukraine) Denys Klevzunyk
- (Slovenia) Nik Dragan
