= 2004 Under-16 European Promotion Cup for Men =

2004 EuroBasket Under-16
18th FIBA Europe Under-16 Championship

Tournament details
- Host country: Andorra
- Dates: 20–24 July 2004
- Teams: 5
- Venue(s): 1 (in 1 host city)

Final positions
- Champions: Andorra (1st title)

Tournament statistics
- Top scorer: (Andorra) O. Fernández (29.0)
- Top rebounds: (Andorra) O. Fernández (13.3)
- Top assists: (Luxembourg) F. Wiseler (3.0)
- PPG (Team): Andorra (106.0)
- RPG (Team): Scotland (48.8)
- APG (Team): Luxembourg (12.8)

Official website
- Official web

The 2004 FIBA U16 European Championship Division C was held in Andorra la Vella, Andorra, from 20 to 24 July 2004. Five teams participated in the competition.

== Participating teams ==
- Andorra (hosts)
- Gibraltar
- Luxembourg
- Scotland
- Wales

== Standings ==
Pos	Team	Pld	W	L	PF	PA	PD	Pts	Medal
1	Andorra	4	4	0	424	267	+157	8	Gold
2	Luxembourg	4	3	1	382	229	+153	7	Silver
3	Scotland	4	2	2	367	246	+121	6	Bronze
4	Wales	4	1	3	180	332	−152	5	
5	Gibraltar	4	0	4	112	391	−279	4	

Source: FIBA Europe

20 July 2004

Report

Wales	32–83	Scotland

20 July 2004

Report

Gibraltar	38–113	Andorra

21 July 2004

Report

Luxembourg	123–24	Gibraltar

21 July 2004

Report

Andorra	114–58	Wales

22 July 2004

Report

Wales	37–97	Luxembourg

22 July 2004

Report

Scotland	97–114	Andorra

23 July 2004

Report

Luxembourg	88–85	Scotland

23 July 2004

Report

Gibraltar	38–53	Wales

24 July 2004

Report

Scotland	102–12	Gibraltar

24 July 2004

Report

Andorra	83–74	Luxembourg
