= Czechoslovakia men's national under-16 basketball team =

Czechoslovakia
- FIBA zone: FIBA Europe
- National federation: Basketball Federation of Czechoslovakia

U16 European Championship
- Appearances: 3
- Medals: None

The Czechoslovakia men's national under-16 basketball team was a national basketball team of Czechoslovakia. It represented the country in men's international under-16 basketball competitions.

== FIBA U16 European Championship participations ==
| Year | Result in Division A |
|---|---|
| 1973 | 11th |
| 1975 | 8th |
| 1991 | 10th |

== See also ==
- Czechoslovakia men's national basketball team
- Czechoslovakia men's national under-18 basketball team
