= 2010 FIBA Europe Under-16 Championship for Women Division C =

Tournament details
- Host country: Andorra
- City: Andorra la Vella
- Dates: 26–31 July 2010
- Teams: 6 (from 1 confederation)
- Venue: 1 (in 1 host city)

Final positions
- Champions: Scotland (2nd title)
- Runners-up: Monaco
- Third place: Andorra

The 2010 FIBA Europe Under-16 Championship for Women Division C was the 6th edition of the Division C of the FIBA U16 Women's European Championship, the third tier of the European women's under-16 basketball championship. It was played in Andorra la Vella, Andorra, from 26 to 31 July 2010. Scotland women's national under-16 basketball team won the tournament.

== Participating teams ==
- Andorra
- Cyprus
- Gibraltar
- Malta
- Monaco
- Scotland

== First round ==
=== Group A ===
Pos	Team	Pld	W	L	PF	PA	PD	Pts	Qualification
1	Scotland	2	2	0	132	68	+64	4	Semifinals
2	Monaco	2	1	1	87	105	−18	3	Quarterfinals
3	Malta	2	0	2	70	116	−46	2	Quarterfinals

Source: FIBA Archive

26 July 2010

Boxscore

Monaco	37–66	Scotland

27 July 2010

Boxscore

Malta	39–50	Monaco

28 July 2010

Boxscore

Scotland	66–31	Malta

=== Group B ===
Pos	Team	Pld	W	L	PF	PA	PD	Pts	Qualification
1	Andorra	2	2	0	97	62	+35	4	Semifinals
2	Cyprus	2	1	1	63	77	−14	3	Quarterfinals
3	Gibraltar	2	0	2	62	83	−21	2	Quarterfinals

Source: FIBA Archive

26 July 2010

Boxscore

Andorra	51–31	Gibraltar

27 July 2010

Boxscore

Gibraltar	31–32	Cyprus

28 July 2010

Boxscore

Cyprus	31–46	Andorra

== Playoffs ==
Quarterfinals
B2	Cyprus	51
A3	Malta	40
A2	Monaco	51
B3	Gibraltar	32

Semifinals
A1	Scotland	82
B2	Cyprus	28
B1	Andorra	36
A2	Monaco	37
5th place match
B3	Gibraltar	22
A3	Malta	50

Final
A1	Scotland	95
A2	Monaco	32
3rd place match
B2	Cyprus	36
B1	Andorra	49

=== Quarterfinals ===
29 July 2010

Boxscore

Monaco	51–32	Gibraltar

29 July 2010

Boxscore

Cyprus	51–40	Malta

=== Semifinals ===
30 July 2010

Boxscore

Scotland	82–28	Cyprus

30 July 2010

Boxscore

Andorra	36–37	Monaco

=== 5th place match ===
30 July 2010

Boxscore

Gibraltar	22–50	Malta

=== 3rd place match ===
31 July 2010

Boxscore

Cyprus	36–49	Andorra

=== Final ===
31 July 2010

Boxscore

Scotland	95–32	Monaco

== Final standings ==
Rank	Team
1st place, gold medalist(s)	Scotland
2nd place, silver medalist(s)	Monaco
3rd place, bronze medalist(s)	Andorra
4	Cyprus
5	Malta
6	Gibraltar
