= Cyprus women's national under-16 basketball team =

Cyprus
- FIBA zone: FIBA Europe
- National federation: Cyprus Basketball Federation

U17 World Cup
- Appearances: None

U16 EuroBasket
- Appearances: None

U16 EuroBasket Division B
- Appearances: 3
- Medals: None

U16 EuroBasket Division C
- Appearances: 9
- Medals: Gold: 5 (2000, 2013, 2019, 2022, 2025); Silver: 3 (2011, 2012, 2024)

The Cyprus women's national under-16 basketball team is a national basketball team of Cyprus, administered by the Cyprus Basketball Federation. It represents the country in under-16 women's international basketball competitions.

== FIBA U16 Women's EuroBasket participations ==
Year	Division B	Division C
2000		1st place, gold medalist(s)
2010		4th
2011		2nd place, silver medalist(s)
2012		2nd place, silver medalist(s)
2013		1st place, gold medalist(s)
2016	22nd	

Year	Division B	Division C
2019		1st place, gold medalist(s)
2022		1st place, gold medalist(s)
2023	20th	
2024		2nd place, silver medalist(s)
2025		1st place, gold medalist(s)
2026	19th	

== See also ==
- Cyprus women's national basketball team
- Cyprus women's national under-18 basketball team
- Cyprus men's national under-16 basketball team
