= Scotland men's national under-16 basketball team =

Youth basketball team representing Scotland

Scotland
- FIBA zone: FIBA Europe
- National federation: Basketballscotland

U17 World Cup
- Appearances: None

U16 EuroBasket
- Appearances: 1
- Medals: None

U16 EuroBasket Division B
- Appearances: 3
- Medals: None

U16 EuroBasket Division C
- Appearances: 10
- Medals: Gold: 2 (2000, 2008); Silver: 4 (2006, 2010, 2012, 2013); Bronze: 2 (2002, 2004)

The Scotland men's national under-16 basketball team is a national basketball team of Scotland, administered by Basketballscotland. It represents the country in international under-16 men's basketball competitions.

The team finished 19th at the 1975 FIBA Europe Under-16 Championship. They also won 8 medals at the FIBA U16 EuroBasket Division C.

== FIBA U16 EuroBasket participations ==
Year	Division A	Division B	Division C
1975	19th		
2000			1st place, gold medalist(s)
2002			3rd place, bronze medalist(s)
2004			3rd place, bronze medalist(s)
2006			2nd place, silver medalist(s)
2008			1st place, gold medalist(s)
2010			2nd place, silver medalist(s)

Year	Division A	Division B	Division C
2012			2nd place, silver medalist(s)
2013			2nd place, silver medalist(s)
2014		18th	
2015		23rd	
2016		24th	
2018			5th
2019			4th

== See also ==
- Scotland men's national basketball team
- Scotland men's national under-18 basketball team
- Scotland women's national under-16 basketball team
