= 2006 Under-16 European Promotion Cup for Men =

2006 EuroBasket Under-16
20th FIBA Europe Under-16 Championship

Tournament details
- Host country: Andorra
- Dates: 25–30 July 2006
- Teams: 8
- Venue(s): 1 (in 1 host city)

Final positions
- Champions: Luxembourg (1st title)

Tournament statistics
- Top scorer: (San Marino) E. Zanotti (19.8)
- Top rebounds: (San Marino) E. Zanotti (20.4)
- Top assists: (Scotland) C. Reilly (6.0)
- PPG (Team): Luxembourg (98.2)
- RPG (Team): Malta (48.4)
- APG (Team): Luxembourg (19.0)

Official website
- Official web

The 2006 FIBA U16 European Championship Division C was held in Andorra la Vella, Andorra, from 25 to 30 July 2006. Eight teams participated in the competition.

== Participating teams ==
- Andorra (hosts)
- Cyprus
- Luxembourg
- Malta
- Monaco
- San Marino
- Scotland
- Wales

== Group phase ==
=== Group A ===
Pos	Team	Pld	W	L	PF	PA	PD	Pts	Team advances to
1	Cyprus	3	3	0	204	125	+79	6	Semifinals
2	Malta	3	2	1	162	173	−11	5	Semifinals
3	Monaco	3	1	2	175	191	−16	4	5th – 8th place classification
4	Andorra	3	0	3	150	202	−52	3	5th – 8th place classification

Source: FIBA Europe

25 July 2004

Report

Cyprus	62–35	Malta

25 July 2004

Report

Andorra	59–65	Monaco

26 July 2004

Report

Monaco	55–74	Cyprus

26 July 2004

Report

Malta	69–56	Andorra

27 July 2004

Report

Malta	58–55	Monaco

27 July 2004

Report

Andorra	35–68	Cyprus

=== Group B ===
Pos	Team	Pld	W	L	PF	PA	PD	Pts	Team advances to
1	Luxembourg	3	3	0	298	112	+186	6	Semifinals
2	Scotland	3	2	1	239	175	+64	5	Semifinals
3	Wales	3	1	2	136	269	−133	4	5th – 8th place classification
4	San Marino	3	0	3	140	257	−117	3	5th – 8th place classification

Source: FIBA Europe

25 July 2004

Report

Luxembourg	104–39	San Marino

25 July 2004

Report

Scotland	101–48	Wales

26 July 2004

Report

Wales	23–117	Luxembourg

26 July 2004

Report

San Marino	50–88	Scotland

27 July 2004

Report

Luxembourg	77–50	Scotland

27 July 2004

Report

Wales	65–51	San Marino

== Knockout stage ==
=== Bracket ===
Semifinals
29 July
Cyprus	54
Scotland	59
29 July
Malta	31
Luxembourg	108

Final
30 July
Scotland	69
Luxembourg	85
Third place
30 July
Cyprus	59
Malta	42

5–8th place bracket

5–8th place semifinals
29 July
Monaco	49
San Marino	76
29 July
Andorra	70
Wales	68

Fifth place
30 July
San Marino	71
Andorra	67
Seventh place
30 July
Monaco	54
Wales	56

=== 5th – 8th place classification ===
29 July 2004

Report

Monaco	49–76	San Marino

29 July 2004

Report

Andorra	70–68	Wales

=== Semifinals ===
29 July 2004

Report

Cyprus	54–59	Scotland

29 July 2004

Report

Malta	31–108	Luxembourg

=== 7th place game ===
30 July 2004

Report

Monaco	54–56	Wales

=== 5th place game ===
30 July 2004

Report

San Marino	71–67	Andorra

=== 3rd place game ===
30 July 2004

Report

Cyprus	59–42	Malta

=== Final ===
30 July 2004

Report

Scotland	69–85	Luxembourg

== Final standings ==
Rank	Team	Record
1st place, gold medalist(s)	Luxembourg	5–0
2nd place, silver medalist(s)	Scotland	3–2
3rd place, bronze medalist(s)	Cyprus	4–1
4	Malta	2–3
5	San Marino	2–3
6	Andorra	1–4
7	Wales	2–3
8	Monaco	1–4
