= 2006 Under-16 European Promotion Cup for Women =

Tournament details
- Host country: Luxembourg
- City: Kirchberg
- Dates: 11–16 July 2006
- Teams: 4 (from 1 confederation)
- Venue(s): 1 (in 1 host city)

Final positions
- Champions: Scotland (1st title)
- Runners-up: Luxembourg
- Third place: Monaco

The 2006 Under-16 European Promotion Cup for Women was the fourth edition of the basketball European Promotion Cup for U16 women's teams, today known as the FIBA U16 Women's European Championship Division C. It was played in Kirchberg, Luxembourg, from 11 to 16 July 2006. Scotland women's national under-16 basketball team won the tournament.

== Participating teams ==
- Gibraltar
- Luxembourg
- Monaco
- Scotland

== First round ==
Pos	Team	Pld	W	L	PF	PA	PD	Pts	Qualification
1	Luxembourg	3	3	0	218	112	+106	6	Semifinals
2	Scotland	3	2	1	198	107	+91	5	Semifinals
3	Monaco	3	1	2	112	160	−48	4	Semifinals
4	Gibraltar	3	0	3	74	223	−149	3	Semifinals

Source: FIBA Archive

11 July 2006

Boxscore

Gibraltar	19–91	Scotland

11 July 2006

Boxscore

Luxembourg	77–33	Monaco

12 July 2006

Boxscore

Monaco	50–27	Gibraltar

12 July 2006

Boxscore

Scotland	51–59	Luxembourg

13 July 2006

Boxscore

Gibraltar	28–82	Luxembourg

13 July 2006

Boxscore

Monaco	29–56	Scotland

== Playoffs ==
Semifinals
A1	Luxembourg	104
A4	Gibraltar	23
A2	Scotland	88
A3	Monaco	43

Final
A1	Luxembourg	48
A2	Scotland	53
3rd place match
A4	Gibraltar	23
A3	Monaco	68

=== Semifinals ===
15 July 2006

Boxscore

Luxembourg	104–23	Gibraltar

15 July 2006

Boxscore

Scotland	88–43	Monaco

=== 3rd place match ===
16 July 2006

Boxscore

Gibraltar	23–68	Monaco

=== Final ===
16 July 2006

Boxscore

Luxembourg	48–53	Scotland

== Final standings ==
Rank	Team
1st place, gold medalist(s)	Scotland
2nd place, silver medalist(s)	Luxembourg
3rd place, bronze medalist(s)	Monaco
4	Gibraltar
