= Gibraltar women's national under-16 basketball team =

Gibraltar
- FIBA zone: FIBA Europe
- National federation: Gibraltar Amateur Basketball Association

U17 World Cup
- Appearances: None

U16 EuroBasket
- Appearances: None

U16 EuroBasket Division B
- Appearances: None

U16 EuroBasket Division C
- Appearances: 19
- Medals: None

The Gibraltar women's national under-16 basketball team is a national basketball team of Gibraltar, administered by the Gibraltar Amateur Basketball Association. It represents the country in international under-16 women's basketball competitions.

== FIBA U16 Women's EuroBasket participations ==
Year	Result in Division C
2000	6th
2002	6th
2004	4th
2006	4th
2008	6th
2010	6th
2011	5th
2012	4th
2013	4th
2014	5th

Year	Result in Division C
2015	5th
2016	5th
2017	6th
2018	8th
2019	7th
2023	8th
2024	8th
2025	8th
2026	7th

== See also ==
- Gibraltar women's national basketball team
- Gibraltar women's national under-18 basketball team
- Gibraltar men's national under-16 basketball team
