= Basketball Wales National League =

Basketball competition in Wales

- Sport: Basketball
- Founded: 2021; 5 years ago
- No. of teams: 7
- Countries: Wales
- Most recent champions: Cardiff Met Archers (3rd title)
- Website: Official website

The Basketball Wales National League, or BWNL for short, is a league competition for basketball clubs from Wales. The league was formed in 2021 by Basketball Wales, the governing body of the sport in Wales, to increase interest and competitive standards in the country. Wales was the only remaining home nation member of British Basketball not to run a national league. The new competition would bring it in line with the National Basketball League and the Scottish Basketball Championship, behind Super League Basketball, and now British Championship Basketball, the professional leagues in Great Britain. Welsh teams have historically competed in the North Wales Basketball League, the South Wales Basketball League or the National Basketball League in England. For the inaugural season, teams also continued to compete in their previous league competitions.

== Teams ==
Current teams

Club	Location	Founded	Joined
Caerphilly Cobras	Caerphilly	2015	2022
Cardiff Met Archers	Cardiff	1999	2021
Kenfig Cougars	Bridgend	2006	2021
Mold Magic	Mold	1999	2021
RCT Gladiators	Rhondda Cynon Taf	2005	2021
Swansea Storm	Swansea	2005	2023
Ynys Môn Celts	Holyhead	1990	2021

Former teams

Club	Location	Joined	Left
Cardiff City	Cardiff	2023	2024
Cardiff Tribal Hunters	Cardiff	2021	2024
Cheshire Raptors	Ellesmere Port	2021	2022
West Coast Warriors	Aberystwyth	2021	2024

== Seasons ==
=== 2024-25 ===
Teams

Location of teams in 2024–25 Basketball Wales National League

Club	Location	Founded
Caerphilly Cobras	Caerphilly	2015
Cardiff Tribal Hunters	Cardiff	2012
Kenfig Cougars	Bridgend	2006
Mold Magic	Mold	1999
RCT Gladiators	Rhondda Cynon Taf	2005
Swansea Storm	Swansea	2005
Ynys Môn Celts	Holyhead	1990

League table

Pos	Team	Pld	W	L	GF	GA	GD	Pts	
1	Cardiff Met Archers	12	11	1	944	714	+230	23	Qualification to Cup Final
2	Swansea Storm	12	8	4	928	798	+130	20	Qualification to Cup Final
3	RCT Gladiators	12	7	5	582	484	+98	19	Qualification to Plate Final
4	Mold Magic	12	6	6	712	744	−32	18	Qualification to Plate Final
5	Kenfig Cougars	12	4	8	906	974	−68	16	Qualification to Shield Final
6	Caerphilly Cobras	12	4	8	856	989	−133	16	Qualification to Shield Final
7	Ynys Môn Celts	12	2	10	756	980	−224	14	

Source: BasketballWales Official Website

Shield

04 May 2025

Kenfig Cougars	101–64	Caerphilly Cobras

Bangor University

Plate

04 May 2025

RCT Gladiators	101–62	Mold Magic

Bangor University

Cup

04 May 2025

Cardiff Met Archers	87–69	Swansea Storm

Bangor University

=== 2023-24 ===
Teams

Location of teams in 2023–24 Basketball Wales National League

Club	Location	Founded
Bridgend Cougars	Bridgend	2006
Caerphilly Cobras	Caerphilly	2015
Cardiff City	Cardiff	2007
Cardiff Met Archers	Cardiff	1999
Cardiff Tribal Hunters	Cardiff	2012
Mold Magic	Mold	1999
RCT Gladiators	Rhondda Cynon Taf	2005
Swansea Storm	Swansea	2005
West Coast Warriors	Aberystwyth	1991
Ynys Môn Celts	Holyhead	1990

Group A

Pos	Team	Pld	W	L	GF	GA	GD	Pts
1	RCT Gladiators	4	4	0	402	238	+164	8
2	Swansea Storm	4	3	1	337	291	+46	6
3	Mold Magic	4	2	2	304	302	+2	4
4	Caerphilly Cobras	4	1	3	265	335	−70	2
5	West Coast Warriors	4	0	4	216	370	−154	0

Source: BasketballWales Official Website

Group B

Pos	Team	Pld	W	L	GF	GA	GD	Pts
1	Cardiff Met Archers	4	4	0	455	336	+119	8
2	Cardiff Tribal Hunters	4	2	2	332	344	−12	4
3	Ynys Môn Celts	4	2	2	227	257	−30	4
4	Cardiff City	4	2	2	277	263	+14	4
5	Bridgend Cougars	4	0	4	283	374	−91	0

Source: BasketballWales Official Website

Plate
Semi-finals

Mold Magic	w–c	Cardiff City

Ynys Môn Celts	77–60	Caerphilly Cobras

Final

06 Apr 2024

Mold Magic	64–46	Ynys Môn Celts

Bangor University

Trophy
Semi-finals

RCT Gladiators	117–72	Cardiff Tribal Hunters

Cardiff Met Archers	99–80	Swansea Storm

Final

06 Apr 2024

RCT Gladiators	89–91	Cardiff Met Archers

Bangor University

=== 2022-23 ===
Teams

Location of teams in 2022–23 Basketball Wales National League

Club	Location	Founded
Bridgend Cougars	Bridgend	2006
Caerphilly Cobras	Caerphilly	2015
Cardiff Met Archers	Cardiff	1999
Cardiff Tribal Hunters	Cardiff	2012
Mold Magic	Mold	1999
RCT Gladiators	Rhondda Cynon Taf	2005
West Coast Warriors	Aberystwyth	1991
Ynys Môn Celts	Holyhead	1990

Group A

Pos	Team	Pld	W	L	GF	GA	GD	Pts
1	RCT Gladiators	2	2	0	178	106	+72	4
2	Ynys Môn Celts	3	2	1	235	227	+8	4
3	Caerphilly Cobras	3	1	2	196	235	−39	2
4	Cardiff Tribal Hunters	2	0	2	130	171	−41	0

Source: BasketballWales Official Website

Group B

Pos	Team	Pld	W	L	GF	GA	GD	Pts
1	Cardiff Met Archers	3	3	0	280	193	+87	6
2	Mold Magic	3	2	1	230	196	+34	4
3	Bridgend Cougars	3	1	2	213	225	−12	2
4	West Coast Warriors	3	0	3	145	254	−109	0

Source: BasketballWales Official Website

Plate
Semi-finals

Bridgend Cougars	61–79	Cardiff Tribal Hunters

Caerphilly Cobras	84–63	West Coast Warriors

Final

26 Mar 2023

Caerphilly Cobras	74–84	Cardiff Tribal Hunters

Cheshire Oaks Arena

Trophy
Semi-finals

RCT Gladiators	78–66	Mold Magic

Cardiff Met Archers	111–72	Ynys Mon Celts

Final

26 Mar 2023

RCT Gladiators	82–90	Cardiff Met Archers

Cheshire Oaks Arena

Final ranking

Pos	Team	Pld	W	L
1	Cardiff Met Archers (C)	5	5	0
2	RCT Gladiators	4	3	1
3	Mold Magic	4	2	2
4	Ynys Môn Celts	4	2	2
5	Cardiff Tribal Hunters	4	2	2
6	Caerphilly Cobras	5	2	3
7	Bridgend Cougars	4	1	3
8	West Coast Warriors	4	0	4

(C) Champions

=== 2021-22 ===
Teams

Location of teams in 2021–22 Basketball Wales National League (inaugural)

Club	Location	Founded
Aberystwyth Warriors	Aberystwyth	1991
Bridgend Cougars	Bridgend	2006
Cardiff Met Archers	Cardiff	1999
Cardiff Tribal Hunters	Cardiff	2012
Cheshire Raptors	Ellesmere Port	2019
Mold Magic	Mold	1999
RCT Gladiators	Rhondda Cynon Taf	2005
Ynys Môn Celts	Holyhead	1990

Group A

Pos	Team	Pld	W	L	GF	GA	GD	Pts
1	RCT Gladiators	3	3	0	292	202	+90	6
2	Cheshire Raptors	3	2	1	254	211	+43	4
3	Ynys Môn Celts	3	1	2	203	266	−63	2
4	Bridgend Cougars	3	0	3	183	253	−70	0

Source: BasketballWales Official Website

Group B

Pos	Team	Pld	W	L	GF	GA	GD	Pts
1	Cardiff Met Archers	3	3	0	275	202	+73	6
2	Mold Magic	3	2	1	252	187	+65	4
3	Cardiff Tribal Hunters	3	1	2	186	238	−52	2
4	Aberystwyth Warriors	3	0	3	201	287	−86	0

Source: BasketballWales Official Website

Plate

Cardiff Tribal Hunters	87–77	Bridgend Cougars

Ynys Mon Celts	74–64	Aberystwyth Warriors

Ynys Mon Celts	71–90	Cardiff Tribal Hunters

Cup

Semi-finals

RCT Gladiators	104–60	Mold Magic

Cardiff Met Archers	88–91	Cheshire Raptors

Final

2 Apr 2022

LiveStats

RCT Gladiators	78–85	Cheshire Raptors

Glyndwr University

Final ranking

Pos	Team	Pld	W	L
1	Cheshire Raptors (C)	5	4	1
2	RCT Gladiators	5	4	1
3	Cardiff Met Archers	4	3	1
4	Mold Magic	4	2	2
5	Cardiff Tribal Hunters	5	3	2
6	Ynys Môn Celts	5	2	3
7	Bridgend Cougars	4	0	4
8	Aberystwyth Warriors	4	0	4

(C) Champions
