= 2002 European Promotion Cup for Cadettes =

Tournament details
- Host country: Malta
- Dates: 2–6 July 2002
- Teams: 6 (from 1 confederation)
- Venue: 1 (in 1 host city)

Final positions
- Champions: Luxembourg (1st title)
- Runners-up: Iceland
- Third place: Scotland

The 2002 European Promotion Cup for Cadettes was the second edition of the basketball European Promotion Cup for cadettes, today known as the FIBA U16 Women's European Championship Division C. It was played in Ta' Qali, Malta, from 2 to 6 July 2002. Luxembourg women's national under-16 basketball team won the tournament.

== Participating teams ==
- Andorra
- Gibraltar
- Iceland
- Luxembourg
- Malta
- Scotland

== Final standings ==
Pos	Team	Pld	W	L	PF	PA	PD	Pts
1	Luxembourg	5	5	0	381	202	+179	10
2	Iceland	5	4	1	354	219	+135	9
3	Scotland	5	3	2	296	250	+46	8
4	Malta	5	2	3	265	257	+8	7
5	Andorra	5	1	4	287	272	+15	6
6	Gibraltar	5	0	5	83	466	−383	5

Source: FIBA Archive

== Results ==
2 July 2002

Boxscore

Iceland	62–66	Luxembourg

2 July 2002

Boxscore

Andorra	68–14	Gibraltar

2 July 2002

Boxscore

Malta	31–54	Scotland

3 July 2002

Boxscore

Gibraltar	13–99	Iceland

3 July 2002

Boxscore

Scotland	61–51	Andorra

3 July 2002

Boxscore

Luxembourg	65–30	Malta

4 July 2002

Boxscore

Iceland	62–45	Scotland

4 July 2002

Boxscore

Gibraltar	13–100	Luxembourg

4 July 2002

Boxscore

Andorra	58–59	Malta

5 July 2002

Boxscore

Scotland	98–23	Gibraltar

5 July 2002

Boxscore

Luxembourg	67–59	Andorra

5 July 2002

Boxscore

Malta	44–60	Iceland

6 July 2002

Boxscore

Scotland	38–83	Luxembourg

6 July 2002

Boxscore

Iceland	71–51	Andorra

6 July 2002

Boxscore

Gibraltar	20–101	Malta
