= Iceland women's national under-16 basketball team =

Iceland
- FIBA zone: FIBA Europe
- National federation: Icelandic Basketball Federation

U17 World Cup
- Appearances: None

U16 EuroBasket
- Appearances: None

U16 EuroBasket Division B
- Appearances: 12
- Medals: None

U16 EuroBasket Division C
- Appearances: 5
- Medals: Gold: 3 (2008, 2012, 2015); Silver: 1 (2002)

The Iceland women's national under-16 basketball team is a national basketball team of Iceland, administered by the Icelandic Basketball Federation. It represents the country in international under-16 women's basketball competitions.

== FIBA U16 Women's EuroBasket participations ==
Year	Division B	Division C
2000		4th
2002		2nd place, silver medalist(s)
2004	3rd/4th	
2005	15th	
2006	17th	
2008		1st place, gold medalist(s)
2012		1st place, gold medalist(s)
2015		1st place, gold medalist(s)
2016	18th	

Year	Division B
2017	19th
2018	19th
2019	21st
2022	12th
2023	5th
2024	14th
2025	10th
2026	Rank 2 trio

== See also ==
- Iceland women's national basketball team
- Iceland women's national under-18 basketball team
- Iceland men's national under-16 basketball team
