= 2014 FIBA Europe Under-16 Championship for Women Division C =

Tournament details
- Host country: Malta
- City: Valletta
- Dates: 30 June – 5 July 2014
- Teams: 5 (from 1 confederation)
- Venue(s): 1 (in 1 host city)

Final positions
- Champions: Scotland (3rd title)
- Runners-up: Malta
- Third place: Andorra

The 2014 FIBA Europe Under-16 Championship for Women Division C was the 10th edition of the Division C of the FIBA U16 Women's European Championship, the third tier of the European women's under-16 basketball championship. It was played in Valletta, Malta, from 30 June to 5 July 2014. Scotland women's national under-16 basketball team won the tournament.

== Participating teams ==
- Andorra
- Gibraltar
- Malta
- Scotland
- Wales

== Final standings ==
Pos	Team	Pld	W	L	PF	PA	PD	Pts
1	Scotland	4	4	0	302	118	+184	8
2	Malta	4	3	1	238	143	+95	7
3	Andorra	4	2	2	162	237	−75	6
4	Wales	4	1	3	167	193	−26	5
5	Gibraltar	4	0	4	89	267	−178	4

Source: FIBA Archive

== Results ==
30 June 2014

Boxscore

Andorra	24–87	Scotland

30 June 2014

Boxscore

Malta	66–22	Gibraltar

1 July 2014

Boxscore

Gibraltar	43–63	Andorra

1 July 2014

Boxscore

Wales	38–60	Malta

2 July 2014

Boxscore

Scotland	88–10	Gibraltar

2 July 2014

Boxscore

Andorra	45–39	Wales

4 July 2014

Boxscore

Wales	40–74	Scotland

4 July 2014

Boxscore

Malta	68–30	Andorra

5 July 2014

Boxscore

Gibraltar	14–50	Wales

5 July 2014

Boxscore

Scotland	53–44	Malta
