= 2017 FIBA U16 Women's European Championship Division C =

Tournament details
- Host country: Gibraltar
- Dates: 25–30 July 2017
- Teams: 7 (from 1 confederation)
- Venue: 1 (in 1 host city)

Final positions
- Champions: Armenia (1st title)
- Runners-up: Malta
- Third place: Georgia

Official website
- www.fiba.basketball

The 2017 FIBA U16 Women's European Championship Division C was the 13th edition of the Division C of the FIBA U16 Women's European Championship, the third tier of the European women's under-16 basketball championship. It was played in Gibraltar from 25 to 30 July 2017. Armenia women's national under-16 basketball team won the tournament.

== Participating teams ==
- Armenia
- Georgia
- Gibraltar
- Kosovo
- Malta
- Monaco
- Wales

== First round ==
=== Group A ===
Pos	Team	Pld	W	L	PF	PA	PD	Pts	Qualification
1	Malta	2	2	0	132	102	+30	4	Semifinals
2	Georgia	2	1	1	121	105	+16	3	Semifinals
3	Kosovo	2	0	2	107	153	−46	2	5th–7th place classification

Source: FIBA

25 July 2017

Boxscore

Georgia	39–61	Malta

Tercentenary Sports Hall

26 July 2017

Boxscore

Kosovo	44–82	Georgia

Tercentenary Sports Hall

27 July 2017

Boxscore

Malta	71–63	Kosovo

Tercentenary Sports Hall

=== Group B ===
Pos	Team	Pld	W	L	PF	PA	PD	Pts	Qualification
1	Armenia	3	3	0	209	116	+93	6	Semifinals
2	Wales	3	2	1	126	154	−28	5	Semifinals
3	Gibraltar	3	1	2	162	157	+5	4	5th–7th place classification
4	Monaco	3	0	3	130	200	−70	3	5th–7th place classification

Source: FIBA

25 July 2017

Boxscore

Armenia	81–41	Monaco

Tercentenary Sports Hall

25 July 2017

Boxscore

Gibraltar	46–48	Wales

Tercentenary Sports Hall

26 July 2017

Boxscore

Wales	31–63	Armenia

Tercentenary Sports Hall

26 July 2017

Boxscore

Monaco	44–72	Gibraltar

Tercentenary Sports Hall

27 July 2017

Boxscore

Wales	47–45	Monaco

Tercentenary Sports Hall

27 July 2017

Boxscore

Armenia	65–44	Gibraltar

Tercentenary Sports Hall

== 5th–7th place classification ==
Pos	Team	Pld	W	L	PF	PA	PD	Pts
5	Kosovo	2	2	0	203	100	+103	4
6	Gibraltar	2	1	1	116	139	−23	3
7	Monaco	2	0	2	100	180	−80	2

Source: FIBA

29 July 2017

Boxscore

Monaco	56–108	Kosovo

Tercentenary Sports Hall

30 July 2017

Boxscore

Kosovo	95–44	Gibraltar

Tercentenary Sports Hall

== Championship playoffs ==
Semifinals
A1	Malta	61
B2	Wales	33
B1	Armenia	74
A2	Georgia	53

Final
A1	Malta	44
B1	Armenia	63
3rd place match
B2	Wales	45
A2	Georgia	66

=== Semifinals ===
29 July 2017

Boxscore

Malta	61–33	Wales

Tercentenary Sports Hall

29 July 2017

Boxscore

Armenia	74–53	Georgia

Tercentenary Sports Hall

=== 3rd place match ===
30 July 2017

Boxscore

Wales	45–66	Georgia

Tercentenary Sports Hall

=== Final ===
30 July 2017

Boxscore

Malta	44–63	Armenia

Tercentenary Sports Hall

== Final standings ==
Rank	Team
1st place, gold medalist(s)	Armenia
2nd place, silver medalist(s)	Malta
3rd place, bronze medalist(s)	Georgia
4	Wales
5	Kosovo
6	Gibraltar
7	Monaco
