= 1975 FIBA Europe Under-16 Championship =

1975 EuroBasket Under-16
3rd FIBA Europe Under-16 Championship

Tournament details
- Host country: Greece
- Dates: 15–24 July 1975
- Teams: 20
- Venue(s): (in 2 host cities)

Final positions
- Champions: Soviet Union (2nd title)

The 1975 FIBA Europe Under-16 Championship (known at that time as 1975 European Championship for Cadets) was the third edition of the FIBA Europe Under-16 Championship. The cities of Athens and Thessaloniki, in Greece, hosted the tournament. The Soviet Union won their second title in a row and became the most winning country in the tournament.

== Teams ==
- Austria
- Belgium
- Bulgaria
- Czechoslovakia
- England
- France
- Greece
- Iceland
- Israel
- Italy
- Netherlands
- Poland
- Portugal
- Scotland
- Soviet Union
- Spain
- Sweden
- Wales
- West Germany
- Yugoslavia

== Preliminary round ==
The twenty teams were allocated in four groups (two groups of four teams each and two groups of six teams each).

Team advanced to Quarterfinals
Team competed in 9th–16th playoffs
Team competed in 17th–18th playoffs
Team competed in 19th–20th playoffs

=== Group A ===
Team	Pld	W	L	PF	PA	Pts
Greece	3	3	0	202	135	6
Spain	3	2	1	227	133	5
Sweden	3	1	2	159	184	4
Portugal	3	0	3	114	250	3

=== Group B ===
Team	Pld	W	L	PF	PA	Pts
Yugoslavia	3	3	0	242	180	6
Belgium	3	2	1	198	218	5
Bulgaria	3	1	2	211	205	4
France	3	0	3	180	228	3

=== Group C ===
Team	Pld	W	L	PF	PA	Pts
Soviet Union	5	5	0	563	214	10
Czechoslovakia	5	4	1	420	262	9
Poland	5	3	2	425	348	8
Iceland	5	2	3	265	425	7
Austria	5	1	4	243	341	6
Scotland	5	0	5	180	506	5

=== Group D ===
Team	Pld	W	L	PF	PA	Pts
Italy	5	5	0	504	253	10
Netherlands	5	4	1	381	320	9
Israel	5	3	2	494	323	8
West Germany	5	2	3	415	306	7
England	5	1	4	261	407	6
Wales	5	0	5	157	603	5

== Knockout stage ==
=== 19th–20th playoffs ===
19th place
Scotland	68
Wales	47

=== 17th–18th playoffs ===
17th place
Austria	57
England	49

=== 9th–12th playoffs ===
Quarterfinals
Portugal	40
Bulgaria	82
Sweden	57
France	55
Iceland	69
Israel	118
Poland	59
West Germany	80

Qualifying round
Bulgaria	61
Sweden	57
Israel	74
West Germany	80

Ninth place
Bulgaria	62
West Germany	77
Eleventh place
Israel	85
Sweden	68

==== 13th–16th playoffs ====
Playoffs
Portugal	68
France	54
Iceland	53
Poland	107

Thirteenth place
Portugal	2
Poland	0
Fifteenth place
France	58
Iceland	54

=== Championship ===
Quarterfinals
Spain	65
Yugoslavia	67
Greece	78
Belgium	72
Czechoslovakia	61
Italy	85
Netherlands	50
Soviet Union	84

Semifinals
Yugoslavia	68
Greece	77
Italy	69
Soviet Union	107

Final
Greece	61
Soviet Union	64
Third place
Yugoslavia	74
Italy	72

==== 5th–8th playoffs ====
Playoffs
Spain	71
Belgium	62
Czechoslovakia	63
Netherlands	64

Fifth place
Spain	92
Netherlands	49
Seventh place
Belgium	85
Czechoslovakia	67

1975 FIBA Europe U-16 Championship

Soviet Union
Second title

== Final standings ==
Rank	Team
Gold medal	Soviet Union
Silver medal	Greece
Bronze medal	Yugoslavia
4th	Italy
5th	Spain
6th	Netherlands
7th	Belgium
8th	Czechoslovakia
9th	West Germany
10th	Bulgaria
11th	Israel
12th	Sweden
13th	Portugal
14th	Poland
15th	France
16th	Iceland
17th	Austria
18th	England
19th	Scotland
20th	Wales
