= Monaco women's national under-16 basketball team =

Monaco
- FIBA zone: FIBA Europe
- National federation: Fédération Monégasque de Basketball

U17 World Cup
- Appearances: None

U16 EuroBasket
- Appearances: None

U16 EuroBasket Division B
- Appearances: None

U16 EuroBasket Division C
- Appearances: 8
- Medals: Silver: 1 (2010); Bronze: 2 (2006, 2013)

The Monaco women's national under-16 basketball team is a national basketball team of Monaco, administered by the Fédération Monégasque de Basketball. It represents the country in international under-16 women's basketball competitions.

The team won three medals at the U16 EuroBasket Division C.

== FIBA U16 Women's EuroBasket participations ==
Year	Result in Division C
2006	3rd place, bronze medalist(s)
2008	5th
2010	2nd place, silver medalist(s)
2011	4th
2012	7th
2013	3rd place, bronze medalist(s)
2017	7th
2018	7th

== See also ==
- Monaco women's national under-18 basketball team
- Monaco men's national under-16 basketball team
