= Norway men's national under-16 basketball team =

Youth basketball team representing Norway

Norway
- FIBA zone: FIBA Europe
- National federation: Norges Basketballforbund

U17 World Cup
- Appearances: None

U16 EuroBasket
- Appearances: None

U16 EuroBasket Division B
- Appearances: 16
- Medals: None
Home	Away

The Norway men's national under-16 basketball team is a national basketball team of Norway, administered by the Norwegian Basketball Federation. It represents the country in international under-16 men's basketball competitions.

== FIBA U16 EuroBasket participations ==
Year	Result in Division B
2006	15th
2007	20th
2010	19th
2012	20th
2013	22nd
2014	19th
2015	21st
2016	18th

Year	Result in Division B
2017	24th
2018	22nd
2019	23rd
2022	17th
2023	20th
2024	19th
2025	20th
2026	20th

== See also ==
- Norway men's national basketball team
- Norway men's national under-18 basketball team
- Norway women's national under-16 basketball team
