= 2002 European Promotion Cup for Cadets =

2002 FIBA U16 European Championship
16th FIBA Under-16 European Basketball Championship

Tournament details
- Host country: Cyprus
- Dates: 2–6 July 2002
- Teams: 6 (from 1 federation)
- Venue: 1 (in 1 host city)

Final positions
- Champions: Cyprus (1st title)

Tournament statistics
- Top scorer: (Cyprus) S. Sofocleous (23.5)
- Top rebounds: (Cyprus) P. Koutsoloukas (14.8)
- Top assists: (Andorra) A. Prado (6.6)
- PPG (Team): Luxembourg (110.4)
- RPG (Team): Scotland (43.4)
- APG (Team): Luxembourg (13.2)

Official website
- Official web

The 2002 FIBA U16 European Championship Division C was held in Nicosia, Cyprus, from 2 to 6 July 2002. Six teams participated in the competition.

== Participating teams ==
- Andorra
- Cyprus (hosts)
- Gibraltar
- Luxembourg
- Malta
- Scotland

== Standings ==
Pos	Team	Pld	W	L	PF	PA	PD	Pts	Medal
1	Cyprus	5	5	0	496	278	+218	10	Gold
2	Luxembourg	5	4	1	552	318	+234	9	Silver
3	Scotland	5	3	2	364	309	+55	8	Bronze
4	Andorra	5	2	3	437	393	+44	7	
5	Malta	5	1	4	284	428	−144	6	
6	Gibraltar	5	0	5	133	540	−407	5	

Source: FIBA Europe

2 July 2002

Report

Luxembourg	157–15	Gibraltar

2 July 2002

Report

Andorra	73–87	Scotland

2 July 2002

Report

Malta	23–117	Cyprus

3 July 2002

Report

Gibraltar	16–108	Andorra

3 July 2002

Report

Scotland	84–60	Malta

3 July 2002

Report

Cyprus	91–78	Luxembourg

4 July 2002

Report

Gibraltar	20–81	Scotland

4 July 2002

Report

Luxembourg	119–47	Malta

4 July 2002

Report

Andorra	75–108	Cyprus

5 July 2002

Report

Scotland	69–85	Luxembourg

5 July 2002

Report

Malta	69–85	Andorra

5 July 2002

Report

Cyprus	109–59	Gibraltar

6 July 2002

Report

Andorra	96–113	Luxembourg

6 July 2002

Report

Gibraltar	23–85	Malta

6 July 2002

Report

Cyprus	71–43	Scotland
