= Ukraine men's national under-16 basketball team =

National basketball team of Ukraine

Ukraine
- FIBA zone: FIBA Europe
- National federation: Basketball Federation of Ukraine

U17 World Cup
- Appearances: None

U16 EuroBasket
- Appearances: 9
- Medals: None

U16 EuroBasket Division B
- Appearances: 12
- Medals: Gold: 1 (2004); Silver: 1 (2010)
Home	Away

The Ukraine men's national under-16 basketball team is a national basketball team of Ukraine, administered by the Basketball Federation of Ukraine. It represents the country in international under-16 men's basketball competitions.

== FIBA U16 EuroBasket participations ==
Year	Division A	Division B
2004		1st place, gold medalist(s)
2005	5th	
2006	12th	
2007	10th	
2008	9th	
2009	15th	
2010		2nd place, silver medalist(s)
2011	12th	
2012	12th	
2013	10th	
2014	14th	

Year	Division A	Division B
2015		10th
2016		4th
2017		5th
2018		10th
2019		9th
2022		14th
2023		16th
2024		21st
2025		6th
2026		16th

== See also ==
- Ukraine men's national basketball team
- Ukraine men's national under-18 basketball team
- Ukraine women's national under-16 basketball team
