= Andorra women's national under-16 basketball team =

Andorra
- FIBA zone: FIBA Europe
- National federation: Andorran Basketball Federation

U17 World Cup
- Appearances: None

U16 EuroBasket
- Appearances: None

U16 EuroBasket Division B
- Appearances: None

U16 EuroBasket Division C
- Appearances: 11
- Medals: Gold: 1 (2011); Silver: 2 (2016, 2023); Bronze: 4 (2000, 2004, 2010, 2014)

The Andorra women's national under-16 basketball team is a national basketball team of Andorra, administered by the Andorran Basketball Federation. It represents the country in international under-16 women's basketball competitions.

== FIBA U16 Women's EuroBasket participations ==
Year	Result in Division C
2000	3rd place, bronze medalist(s)
2002	5th
2004	3rd place, bronze medalist(s)
2010	3rd place, bronze medalist(s)
2011	1st place, gold medalist(s)
2012	5th

Year	Result in Division C
2014	3rd place, bronze medalist(s)
2015	6th
2016	2nd place, silver medalist(s)
2022	4th
2023	2nd place, silver medalist(s)

== See also ==
- Andorra women's national basketball team
- Andorra women's national under-18 basketball team
- Andorra men's national under-16 basketball team
