= 2013 FIBA Europe Under-16 Championship Division C =

2013 EuroBasket Under-16
27th FIBA Europe Under-16 Championship

Tournament details
- Host country: Gibraltar
- Dates: 2–7 July 2013
- Teams: 5
- Venue(s): 1 (in 1 host city)

Final positions
- Champions: Gibraltar (1st title)

Tournament statistics
- MVP: (Gibraltar) T. Fava
- Top scorer: (San Marino) P. Berardi (20.0)
- Top rebounds: (Wales) J. Williams (16.5)
- Top assists: (Scotland) F. Wood (3.3)
- PPG (Team): Scotland (71.8)
- RPG (Team): Scotland (53.0)
- APG (Team): Scotland (10.8)

Official website
- Official web

The 2013 FIBA U16 European Championship Division C was held in Gibraltar, from 2 to 7 July 2013. Five teams participated in the competition.

== Participating teams ==
- Andorra
- Gibraltar (hosts)
- San Marino
- Scotland
- Wales

== Standings ==
Pos	Team	Pld	W	L	PF	PA	PD	Pts	Medal
1	Gibraltar	4	4	0	242	194	+48	8	Gold
2	Scotland	4	3	1	287	189	+98	7	Silver
3	Andorra	4	2	2	232	255	−23	6	Bronze
4	Wales	4	1	3	240	283	−43	5	
5	San Marino	4	0	4	208	288	−80	4	

Source: FIBA Europe
