= 2000 European Promotion Cup for Cadettes =

Tournament details
- Host country: Gibraltar
- Dates: 19–23 July 2000
- Teams: 6 (from 1 confederation)
- Venue(s): 1 (in 1 host city)

Final positions
- Champions: Cyprus (1st title)
- Runners-up: Scotland
- Third place: Andorra

The 2000 European Promotion Cup for Cadettes was the first edition of the basketball European Promotion Cup for cadettes, today known as the FIBA U16 Women's European Championship Division C. It was played in Gibraltar from 19 to 23 July 2000. Cyprus women's national under-16 basketball team won the tournament.

== Participating teams ==
- Andorra
- Cyprus
- Gibraltar
- Iceland
- Malta
- Scotland

== Final standings ==
| Pos | Team | Pld | W | L | PF | PA | PD | Pts |
|---|---|---|---|---|---|---|---|---|
| 1 | Cyprus | 5 | 5 | 0 | 380 | 175 | +205 | 10 |
| 2 | Scotland | 5 | 4 | 1 | 325 | 214 | +111 | 9 |
| 3 | Andorra | 5 | 3 | 2 | 268 | 238 | +30 | 8 |
| 4 | Iceland | 5 | 2 | 3 | 343 | 274 | +69 | 7 |
| 5 | Malta | 5 | 1 | 4 | 145 | 328 | −183 | 6 |
| 6 | Gibraltar | 5 | 0 | 5 | 123 | 355 | −232 | 5 |

Source: FIBA Archive

== Results ==
19 July 2000

Boxscore

| Cyprus | 105–20 | Malta |

19 July 2000

Boxscore

| Iceland | 58–86 | Scotland |

19 July 2000

Boxscore

| Gibraltar | 29–63 | Andorra |

20 July 2000

Boxscore

| Malta | 30–87 | Iceland |

20 July 2000

Boxscore

| Andorra | 43–65 | Cyprus |

20 July 2000

Boxscore

| Scotland | 83–22 | Gibraltar |

21 July 2000

Boxscore

| Malta | 32–58 | Andorra |

21 July 2000

Boxscore

| Cyprus | 63–49 | Scotland |

21 July 2000

Boxscore

| Iceland | 96–28 | Gibraltar |

22 July 2000

Boxscore

| Scotland | 51–29 | Malta |

22 July 2000

Boxscore

| Andorra | 62–56 | Iceland |

22 July 2000

Boxscore

| Gibraltar | 17–79 | Cyprus |

23 July 2000

Boxscore

| Andorra | 42–56 | Scotland |

23 July 2000

Boxscore

| Iceland | 46–68 | Cyprus |

23 July 2000

Boxscore

| Gibraltar | 27–34 | Malta |
