= Luxembourg men's national under-16 basketball team =

Youth national basketball team of Luxembourg

Luxembourg
- FIBA zone: FIBA Europe
- National federation: Luxembourg Basketball Federation

U17 World Cup
- Appearances: None

U16 EuroBasket
- Appearances: None

U16 EuroBasket Division B
- Appearances: 16
- Medals: None

U16 EuroBasket Division C
- Appearances: 5
- Medals: Gold: 3 (2006, 2019, 2025); Silver: 2 (2002, 2004)
Home	Away

The Luxembourg men's national under-16 basketball team is a national basketball team of Luxembourg, administered by the Luxembourg Basketball Federation. It represents the country in under-16 men's international basketball competitions.

Luxembourg is successful at the U16 EuroBasket Division C level, winning three gold and two silver medals.

== FIBA U16 EuroBasket participations ==
Year	Division B	Division C
2002		2nd place, silver medalist(s)
2004		2nd place, silver medalist(s)
2006		1st place, gold medalist(s)
2006	14th	
2008	23rd	
2009	16th	
2010	12th	
2011	15th	
2012	18th	
2013	21st	
2014	22nd	

Year	Division B	Division C
2015	20th	
2016	23rd	
2017	20th	
2018	24th	
2019		1st place, gold medalist(s)
2022	20th	
2023	14th	
2024	22nd	
2025		1st place, gold medalist(s)
2026	22nd	

== See also ==
- Luxembourg men's national basketball team
- Luxembourg men's national under-18 basketball team
- Luxembourg women's national under-16 basketball team
