= 2010 FIBA Europe Under-16 Championship Division C =

2010 EuroBasket Under-16
24th FIBA Europe Under-16 Championship

Tournament details
- Host country: Andorra
- Dates: 26–31 July 2010
- Teams: 8
- Venue(s): 1 (in 1 host city)

Final positions
- Champions: Cyprus (2nd title)

Tournament statistics
- Top scorer: (San Marino) J. Gualtieri (22.8)
- Top rebounds: (Malta) A. Falzon (19.2)
- Top assists: (Cyprus) A. Christodoulou (4.4)
- PPG (Team): Cyprus (98.4)
- RPG (Team): Cyprus (58.0)
- APG (Team): Cyprus (19.6)

Official website
- Official web

The 2010 FIBA U16 European Championship Division C was held in Andorra la Vella, Andorra, from 26 to 31 July 2010. Eight teams participated in the competition.

== Participating teams ==
- Andorra (hosts)
- Cyprus
- Gibraltar
- Malta
- Monaco
- San Marino
- Scotland
- Wales

== Group phase ==
=== Group A ===
Pos	Team	Pld	W	L	PF	PA	PD	Pts	Team advances to
1	Scotland	3	3	0	236	150	+86	6	Semifinals
2	Andorra	3	2	1	224	161	+63	5	Semifinals
3	Wales	3	1	2	167	180	−13	4	5th – 8th place classification
4	Monaco	3	0	3	95	231	−136	3	5th – 8th place classification

Source: FIBA Europe

=== Group B ===
Pos	Team	Pld	W	L	PF	PA	PD	Pts	Team advances to
1	Cyprus	3	3	0	331	125	+206	6	Semifinals
2	San Marino	3	2	1	198	206	−8	5	Semifinals
3	Malta	3	1	2	162	197	−35	4	5th – 8th place classification
4	Gibraltar	3	0	3	110	273	−163	3	5th – 8th place classification

Source: FIBA Europe

== Knockout stage ==
=== Bracket ===
Semifinals
30 July
Scotland	71
San Marino	52
30 July
Cyprus	87
Andorra	45

Final
31 July
Scotland	30
Cyprus	74
Third place
31 July
San Marino	54
Andorra	86

5–8th place bracket

5–8th place semifinals
29 July
Wales	89
Gibraltar	43
29 July
Malta	62
Monaco	37

Fifth place
31 July
Wales	53
Malta	37
Seventh place
30 July
Gibraltar	36
Monaco	49

== Final standings ==
Rank	Team	Record
1st place, gold medalist(s)	Cyprus	5–0
2nd place, silver medalist(s)	Scotland	4–1
3rd place, bronze medalist(s)	Andorra	3–2
4	San Marino	2–3
5	Wales	3–2
6	Malta	2–3
7	Monaco	1–4
8	Gibraltar	0–5
