= 2015 FIBA Europe Under-16 Championship for Women Division C =

Tournament details
- Host country: Andorra
- City: Andorra la Vella
- Dates: 20–25 July 2015
- Teams: 6 (from 1 confederation)
- Venue: 1 (in 1 host city)

Final positions
- Champions: Iceland (3rd title)
- Runners-up: Armenia
- Third place: Malta

Official website
- www.fibaeurope.com

The 2015 FIBA Europe Under-16 Championship for Women Division C was the 11th edition of the Division C of the FIBA U16 Women's European Championship, the third tier of the European women's under-16 basketball championship. It was played in Andorra la Vella, Andorra, from 20 to 25 July 2015. Iceland women's national under-16 basketball team won the tournament.

== Participating teams ==
- Andorra
- Armenia
- Gibraltar
- Iceland
- Malta
- Wales

== First round ==
=== Group A ===
Pos	Team	Pld	W	L	PF	PA	PD	Pts	Qualification
1	Armenia	2	2	0	118	62	+56	4	Semifinals
2	Wales	2	1	1	96	110	−14	3	Quarterfinals
3	Gibraltar	2	0	2	84	126	−42	2	Quarterfinals

Source: FIBA Archive

20 July 2015

Boxscore

Gibraltar	29–63	Armenia

21 July 2015

Boxscore

Armenia	55–33	Wales

22 July 2015

Boxscore

Wales	63–55	Gibraltar

=== Group B ===
Pos	Team	Pld	W	L	PF	PA	PD	Pts	Qualification
1	Iceland	2	2	0	166	68	+98	4	Semifinals
2	Malta	2	1	1	87	115	−28	3	Quarterfinals
3	Andorra	2	0	2	77	147	−70	2	Quarterfinals

Source: FIBA Archive

20 July 2015

Boxscore

Malta	37–69	Iceland

21 July 2015

Boxscore

Iceland	97–31	Andorra

22 July 2015

Boxscore

Andorra	46–50	Malta

== Playoffs ==
Quarterfinals
B2	Malta	47
A3	Gibraltar	32
A2	Wales	47
B3	Andorra	45

Semifinals
A1	Armenia	36
B2	Malta	28
B1	Iceland	86
A2	Wales	20
5th place match
B3	Andorra	32
A3	Gibraltar	44

Final
A1	Armenia	39
B1	Iceland	76
3rd place match
B2	Malta	53
A2	Wales	35

=== Quarterfinals ===
23 July 2015

Boxscore

Wales	47–45	Andorra

23 July 2015

Boxscore

Malta	47–32	Gibraltar

=== Semifinals ===
24 July 2015

Boxscore

Iceland	86–20	Wales

24 July 2015

Boxscore

Armenia	36–28	Malta

=== 5th place match ===
25 July 2015

Boxscore

Andorra	32–44	Gibraltar

=== 3rd place match ===
25 July 2015

Boxscore

Malta	53–35	Wales

=== Final ===
25 July 2015

Boxscore

Armenia	39–76	Iceland

== Final standings ==
Rank	Team
1st place, gold medalist(s)	Iceland
2nd place, silver medalist(s)	Armenia
3rd place, bronze medalist(s)	Malta
4	Wales
5	Gibraltar
6	Andorra

Promoted to the 2016 FIBA U16 Women's European Championship Division B
