= Scotland women's national under-16 basketball team =

Scotland
- FIBA zone: FIBA Europe
- National federation: Basketball Scotland

U17 World Cup
- Appearances: None

U16 EuroBasket
- Appearances: 2
- Medals: None

U16 EuroBasket Division B
- Appearances: 2
- Medals: None

U16 EuroBasket Division C
- Appearances: 11
- Medals: Gold: 3 (2006, 2010, 2014); Silver: 4 (2000, 2004, 2013, 2018); Bronze: 4 (2002, 2008, 2012, 2019)

The Scotland women's national under-16 basketball team is a national basketball team of Scotland, administered by Basketball Scotland. It represents the country in international under-16 women's basketball competitions.

In 1976 and 1978, the team finished 14th at the European Championship for Cadettes.

They also participated at two FIBA U16 Women's European Championship Division B tournaments and they won 11 medals at the FIBA U16 Women's European Championship Division C.

== See also ==
- Scotland women's national basketball team
- Scotland women's national under-18 basketball team
- Scotland men's national under-16 basketball team
