= Malta women's national under-16 basketball team =

Malta
- FIBA zone: FIBA Europe
- National federation: Malta Basketball Association

U17 World Cup
- Appearances: None

U16 EuroBasket
- Appearances: None

U16 EuroBasket Division B
- Appearances: None

U16 EuroBasket Division C
- Appearances: 17
- Medals: Gold: 1 (2026); Silver: 2 (2014, 2017); Bronze: 4 (2011, 2015, 2016, 2022)

The Malta women's national under-16 basketball team is a national basketball team of Malta, administered by the Malta Basketball Association. It represents the country in international under-16 women's basketball competitions.

== FIBA U16 Women's EuroBasket participations ==
Year	Result in Division C
2000	5th
2002	4th
2008	4th
2010	5th
2011	3rd place, bronze medalist(s)
2012	6th
2014	2nd place, silver medalist(s)
2015	3rd place, bronze medalist(s)
2016	3rd place, bronze medalist(s)

Year	Result in Division C
2017	2nd place, silver medalist(s)
2018	5th
2019	6th
2022	3rd place, bronze medalist(s)
2023	4th
2024	4th
2025	4th
2026	1st place, gold medalist(s)

== See also ==
- Malta women's national basketball team
- Malta women's national under-18 basketball team
- Malta men's national under-16 basketball team
