= 1991 FIBA Europe Under-16 Championship =

1991 EuroBasket Under-16
11th FIBA Europe Under-16 Championship

Tournament details
- Host country: Greece
- Dates: 18–25 August 1991
- Teams: 12
- Venue(s): (in 3 host cities)

Final positions
- Champions: Italy (1st title)

The 1991 FIBA Europe Under-16 Championship (known at that time as 1991 European Championship for Cadets) was the 11th edition of the FIBA Europe Under-16 Championship. The cities of Kastoria, Komotini and Thessaloniki, in Greece, hosted the tournament. Italy won the trophy for the first time.

== Teams ==
- Belgium
- Bulgaria
- Czechoslovakia
- Germany
- Greece
- Israel
- Italy
- Soviet Union
- Spain
- Switzerland
- Turkey
- Yugoslavia

== Preliminary round ==
The twelve teams were allocated in two groups of six teams each.

Team advanced to Semifinals
Team competed in 5th–8th playoffs
Team competed in 9th–12th playoffs

=== Group A ===
Team	Pld	W	L	PF	PA	Pts
Greece	5	5	0	501	328	10
Turkey	5	4	1	468	416	9
Soviet Union	5	3	2	446	379	8
Israel	5	2	3	424	431	7
Bulgaria	5	1	4	415	521	6
Czechoslovakia	5	0	5	353	532	5

=== Group B ===
Team	Pld	W	L	PF	PA	Pts
Italy	5	5	0	402	336	10
Spain	5	4	1	393	319	9
Yugoslavia	5	3	2	402	337	8
Germany	5	2	3	295	281	7
Belgium	5	1	4	283	313	6
Switzerland	5	0	5	252	441	5

== Knockout stage ==
=== 9th–12th playoffs ===
Playoffs
Belgium	75
Czechoslovakia	84
Switzerland	67
Bulgaria	95

Ninth place
Czechoslovakia	85
Bulgaria	97
Eleventh place
Belgium	82
Switzerland	49

=== 5th–8th playoffs ===
Playoffs
Israel	83
Yugoslavia	63
Soviet Union	96
Germany	76

Fifth place
Israel	60
Soviet Union	79
Seventh place
Yugoslavia	66
Germany	72

=== Championship ===
Semifinals
Italy	85
Turkey	63
Greece	94
Spain	82

Final
Italy	106
Greece	91
Third place
Turkey	67
Spain	87

1991 FIBA Europe U-16 Championship

Italy
First title

== Final standings ==
Rank	Team
Gold medal	Italy
Silver medal	Greece
Bronze medal	Spain
4th	Turkey
5th	Soviet Union
6th	Israel
7th	Germany
8th	Yugoslavia
9th	Bulgaria
10th	Czechoslovakia
11th	Belgium
12th	Switzerland
