= 2008 FIBA Europe Under-16 Championship for Women Division C =

Fifth edition of third tier women's FIBA U16 European championship

Tournament details
- Host country: Monaco
- Dates: 14–19 July 2008
- Teams: 6 (from 1 confederation)
- Venue(s): 1 (in 1 host city)

Final positions
- Champions: Iceland (1st title)
- Runners-up: Albania
- Third place: Scotland

The 2008 FIBA Europe Under-16 Championship for Women Division C was the fifth edition of the Division C of the FIBA U16 Women's European Championship, the third tier of the European women's under-16 basketball championship. It was played in Monaco from 14 to 19 July 2008. Iceland women's national under-16 basketball team won the tournament.

== Participating teams ==
- Albania
- Gibraltar
- Iceland
- Malta
- Monaco
- Scotland

== First round ==
=== Group A ===
Pos	Team	Pld	W	L	PF	PA	PD	Pts	Qualification
1	Scotland	2	2	0	145	84	+61	4	Semifinals
2	Malta	2	1	1	116	112	+4	3	Quarterfinals
3	Monaco	2	0	2	60	125	−65	2	Quarterfinals

Source: FIBA Archive

14 July 2008

Boxscore

Scotland	76–60	Malta

15 July 2008

Boxscore

Malta	56–36	Monaco

16 July 2008

Boxscore

Monaco	24–69	Scotland

=== Group B ===
Pos	Team	Pld	W	L	PF	PA	PD	Pts	Qualification
1	Iceland	2	2	0	179	73	+106	4	Semifinals
2	Albania	2	1	1	135	109	+26	3	Quarterfinals
3	Gibraltar	2	0	2	62	194	−132	2	Quarterfinals

Source: FIBA Archive

14 July 2008

Boxscore

Albania	86–38	Gibraltar

15 July 2008

Boxscore

Gibraltar	24–108	Iceland

16 July 2008

Boxscore

Iceland	71–49	Albania

== Playoffs ==
Quarterfinals
B2	Albania	63
A3	Monaco	37
A2	Malta	54
B3	Gibraltar	33

Semifinals
A1	Scotland	57
B2	Albania	59
B1	Iceland	85
A2	Malta	33
5th place match
B3	Gibraltar	46
A3	Monaco	53

Final
B2	Albania	41
B1	Iceland	74
3rd place match
A1	Scotland	68
A2	Malta	49

=== Quarterfinals ===
17 July 2008

Boxscore

Malta	54–33	Gibraltar

17 July 2008

Boxscore

Albania	63–37	Monaco

=== Semifinals ===
18 July 2008

Boxscore

Scotland	57–59	Albania

18 July 2008

Boxscore

Iceland	85–33	Malta

=== 5th place match ===
19 July 2008

Boxscore

Gibraltar	46–53	Monaco

=== 3rd place match ===
19 July 2008

Boxscore

Scotland	68–49	Malta

=== Final ===
19 July 2008

Boxscore

Albania	41–74	Iceland

== Final standings ==
Rank	Team
1st place, gold medalist(s)	Iceland
2nd place, silver medalist(s)	Albania
3rd place, bronze medalist(s)	Scotland
4	Malta
5	Monaco
6	Gibraltar
