= Georgia women's national under-16 basketball team =

Georgian basketball team

Georgia
- FIBA zone: FIBA Europe
- National federation: Georgian Basketball Federation

U17 World Cup
- Appearances: None

U16 EuroBasket
- Appearances: None

U16 EuroBasket Division B
- Appearances: None

U16 EuroBasket Division C
- Appearances: 8
- Medals: Gold: 1 (2016); Silver: 1 (2019); Bronze: 4 (2017, 2018, 2023, 2026)

The Georgia women's national under-16 basketball team is a national basketball team of Georgia, administered by the Georgian Basketball Federation. It represents the country in international under-16 women's basketball competitions.

== FIBA U16 Women's EuroBasket participations ==
Year	Result in Division C
2016	1st place, gold medalist(s)
2017	3rd place, bronze medalist(s)
2018	3rd place, bronze medalist(s)
2019	2nd place, silver medalist(s)
2023	3rd place, bronze medalist(s)
2024	6th
2025	5th
2026	3rd place, bronze medalist(s)

== See also ==
- Georgia women's national basketball team
- Georgia women's national under-18 basketball team
- Georgia men's national under-16 basketball team
