= 1981 FIBA Europe Under-16 Championship =

1981 EuroBasket Under-16
6th FIBA Europe Under-16 Championship

Tournament details
- Host country: Greece
- Dates: 18–28 August 1981
- Teams: 12
- Venue(s): (in 2 host cities)

Final positions
- Champions: Soviet Union (3rd title)

The 1981 FIBA Europe Under-16 Championship (known at that time as 1981 European Championship for Cadets) was the 6th edition of the FIBA Europe Under-16 Championship. The cities of Thessaloniki and Katerini, in Greece, hosted the tournament. The Soviet Union won the trophy for the third time and became the most winning country in the tournament.

== Teams ==
- Finland
- France
- Greece
- Israel
- Italy
- Poland
- Soviet Union
- Spain
- Sweden
- Turkey
- West Germany
- Yugoslavia

== Preliminary round ==
The twelve teams were allocated in two groups of six teams each.

Team advanced to Semifinals
Team competed in 5th–8th playoffs
Team competed in 9th–12th playoffs

=== Group A ===
Team	Pld	W	L	PF	PA	Pts
Italy	5	5	0	482	332	10
West Germany	5	4	1	310	290	9
Greece	5	3	2	346	345	8
Turkey	5	2	3	357	381	7
Poland	5	1	4	320	403	6
Sweden	5	0	5	350	414	5

=== Group B ===
Team	Pld	W	L	PF	PA	Pts
Soviet Union	5	5	0	463	270	10
Finland	5	3	2	388	415	8
Israel	5	3	2	399	463	8
Yugoslavia	5	2	3	497	471	7
France	5	1	4	348	440	6
Spain	5	1	4	403	439	6

== Knockout stage ==
=== 9th–12th playoffs ===
Playoffs
Poland	65
Spain	93
Sweden	71
France	97

Ninth place
Spain	96
France	63
Eleventh place
Poland	88
Sweden	85

=== 5th–8th playoffs ===
Playoffs
Turkey	100
Israel	99
Yugoslavia	125
Greece	76

Fifth place
Turkey	80
Yugoslavia	97
Seventh place
Israel	83
Greece	96

=== Championship ===
Semifinals
Soviet Union	90
West Germany	57
Italy	104
Finland	65

Final
Soviet Union	72
Italy	57
Third place
West Germany	78
Finland	64

1981 FIBA Europe U-16 Championship

Soviet Union
Third title

== Final standings ==
Rank	Team
Gold medal	Soviet Union
Silver medal	Italy
Bronze medal	West Germany
4th	Finland
5th	Yugoslavia
6th	Turkey
7th	Greece
8th	Israel
9th	Spain
10th	France
11th	Poland
12th	Sweden
