= 2022 FIBA U16 European Championship Division B =

Tournament details
- Host country: Bulgaria
- City: Sofia
- Dates: 11–20 August 2022
- Teams: 22 (from 1 confederation)
- Venue(s): 3 (in 1 host city)

Final positions
- Champions: Germany (3rd title)
- Runners-up: Finland
- Third place: Belgium

Official website
- www.fiba.basketball

The 2022 FIBA U16 European Championship Division B was the 17th edition of the Division B of the European basketball championship for national under-16 teams. It was played from 11 to 20 August 2022 in Sofia, Bulgaria. Germany men's national under-16 basketball team won the tournament.

== Participating teams ==
- Austria
- Belgium
- Bosnia and Herzegovina ▼ (16th place, 2019 FIBA U16 European Championship Division A)
- Bulgaria
- Cyprus
- Czech Republic
- Estonia ▼ (15th place, 2019 FIBA U16 European Championship Division A)
- Finland
- Georgia
- Germany ▼ (14th place, 2019 FIBA U16 European Championship Division A)
- Great Britain
- Hungary
- Iceland
- Ireland
- Luxembourg ▲ (Winners, 2019 FIBA U16 European Championship Division C)
- Norway
- Portugal
- Romania
- Slovakia
- Sweden
- Switzerland
- Ukraine

== First round ==
The draw of the first round was held on 15 February 2022 in Freising, Germany.

In the first round, the teams were drawn into four groups. The first two teams from each group advance to the quarterfinals; the third and fourth teams advance to the 9th–16th place playoffs; the other teams will play in the 17th–22nd place classification groups.

=== Group A ===
Pos	Team	Pld	W	L	PF	PA	PD	Pts	Qualification
1	Belgium	5	5	0	431	268	+163	10	Quarterfinals
2	Austria	5	4	1	418	374	+44	9	Quarterfinals
3	Hungary	5	3	2	413	313	+100	8	9th–16th place playoffs
4	Georgia	5	2	3	371	388	−17	7	9th–16th place playoffs
5	Estonia	5	1	4	276	367	−91	6	17th–22nd place classification
6	Cyprus	5	0	5	220	419	−199	5	17th–22nd place classification

Source: FIBA

11 August 2022

Boxscore

Georgia	75–85	Belgium

Universiada Hall, Sofia

11 August 2022

Boxscore

Austria	85–77	Estonia

Universiada Hall, Sofia

11 August 2022

Boxscore

Cyprus	36–89	Hungary

Universiada Hall, Sofia

12 August 2022

Boxscore

Estonia	67–47	Cyprus

St. George School Gym, Sofia

12 August 2022

Boxscore

Belgium	92–60	Austria

Triaditza Hall, Sofia

12 August 2022

Boxscore

Hungary	82–65	Georgia

Triaditza Hall, Sofia

13 August 2022

Boxscore

Cyprus	47–85	Austria

St. George School Gym, Sofia

13 August 2022

Boxscore

Hungary	75–81	Belgium

Triaditza Hall, Sofia

13 August 2022

Boxscore

Georgia	69–59	Estonia

St. George School Gym, Sofia

15 August 2022

Boxscore

Belgium	86–25	Cyprus

St. George School Gym, Sofia

15 August 2022

Boxscore

Estonia	40–79	Hungary

St. George School Gym, Sofia

15 August 2022

Boxscore

Austria	97–70	Georgia

Universiada Hall, Sofia

16 August 2022

Boxscore

Estonia	33–87	Belgium

Universiada Hall, Sofia

16 August 2022

Boxscore

Georgia	92–65	Cyprus

Universiada Hall, Sofia

16 August 2022

Boxscore

Hungary	88–91	Austria

Universiada Hall, Sofia

=== Group B ===
Pos	Team	Pld	W	L	PF	PA	PD	Pts	Qualification
1	Bulgaria	4	4	0	317	257	+60	8	Quarterfinals
2	Iceland	4	3	1	321	253	+68	7	Quarterfinals
3	Czech Republic	4	2	2	287	304	−17	6	9th–16th place playoffs
4	Switzerland	4	1	3	263	272	−9	5	9th–16th place playoffs
5	Luxembourg	4	0	4	239	341	−102	4	17th–22nd place classification

Source: FIBA

11 August 2022

Boxscore

Luxembourg	49–90	Iceland

Triaditza Hall, Sofia

11 August 2022

Boxscore

Switzerland	60–66	Bulgaria

Universiada Hall, Sofia

12 August 2022

Boxscore

Iceland	86–64	Switzerland

Triaditza Hall, Sofia

12 August 2022

Boxscore

Czech Republic	78–72	Luxembourg

Universiada Hall, Sofia

13 August 2022

Boxscore

Bulgaria	66–64	Iceland

Universiada Hall, Sofia

13 August 2022

Boxscore

Switzerland	64–71	Czech Republic

St. George School Gym, Sofia

15 August 2022

Boxscore

Czech Republic	64–87	Bulgaria

Universiada Hall, Sofia

15 August 2022

Boxscore

Luxembourg	49–75	Switzerland

St. George School Gym, Sofia

16 August 2022

Boxscore

Iceland	81–74	Czech Republic

Triaditza Hall, Sofia

16 August 2022

Boxscore

Bulgaria	98–69	Luxembourg

Universiada Hall, Sofia

=== Group C ===
Pos	Team	Pld	W	L	PF	PA	PD	Pts	Qualification
1	Bosnia and Herzegovina	4	3	1	270	256	+14	7	Quarterfinals
2	Sweden	4	3	1	273	252	+21	7	Quarterfinals
3	Great Britain	4	2	2	239	244	−5	6	9th–16th place playoffs
4	Portugal	4	2	2	262	228	+34	6	9th–16th place playoffs
5	Norway	4	0	4	188	252	−64	4	17th–22nd place classification

Source: FIBA

11 August 2022

Boxscore

Bosnia and Herzegovina	72–69	Sweden

Triaditza Hall, Sofia

11 August 2022

Boxscore

Norway	44–68	Portugal

Triaditza Hall, Sofia

12 August 2022

Boxscore

Portugal	73–54	Bosnia and Herzegovina

St. George School Gym, Sofia

12 August 2022

Boxscore

Great Britain	51–48	Norway

St. George School Gym, Sofia

13 August 2022

Boxscore

Sweden	71–69	Portugal

Universiada Hall, Sofia

13 August 2022

Boxscore

Bosnia and Herzegovina	80–70	Great Britain

Universiada Hall, Sofia

15 August 2022

Boxscore

Norway	44–64	Bosnia and Herzegovina

Triaditza Hall, Sofia

15 August 2022

Boxscore

Great Britain	59–64	Sweden

Triaditza Hall, Sofia

16 August 2022

Boxscore

Portugal	52–59	Great Britain

Triaditza Hall, Sofia

16 August 2022

Boxscore

Sweden	69–52	Norway

Triaditza Hall, Sofia

=== Group D ===
Pos	Team	Pld	W	L	PF	PA	PD	Pts	Qualification
1	Germany	5	5	0	487	279	+208	10	Quarterfinals
2	Finland	5	4	1	385	300	+85	9	Quarterfinals
3	Romania	5	3	2	370	342	+28	8	9th–16th place playoffs
4	Ukraine	5	2	3	359	408	−49	7	9th–16th place playoffs
5	Slovakia	5	1	4	293	404	−111	6	17th–22nd place classification
6	Ireland	5	0	5	256	417	−161	5	17th–22nd place classification

Source: FIBA

11 August 2022

Boxscore

Finland	82–65	Ukraine

St. George School Gym, Sofia

11 August 2022

Boxscore

Slovakia	48–104	Germany

St. George School Gym, Sofia

11 August 2022

Boxscore

Ireland	45–76	Romania

St. George School Gym, Sofia

12 August 2022

Boxscore

Ukraine	93–71	Slovakia

Universiada Hall, Sofia

12 August 2022

Boxscore

Romania	68–84	Finland

Universiada Hall, Sofia

12 August 2022

Boxscore

Germany	116–57	Ireland

Universiada Hall, Sofia

13 August 2022

Boxscore

Ireland	47–58	Slovakia

Triaditza Hall, Sofia

13 August 2022

Boxscore

Romania	88–57	Ukraine

Universiada Hall, Sofia

13 August 2022

Boxscore

Finland	59–84	Germany

Triaditza Hall, Sofia

15 August 2022

Boxscore

Germany	83–59	Romania

Universiada Hall, Sofia

15 August 2022

Boxscore

Slovakia	43–81	Finland

Universiada Hall, Sofia

15 August 2022

Boxscore

Ukraine	88–67	Ireland

Triaditza Hall, Sofia

16 August 2022

Boxscore

Germany	100–56	Ukraine

St. George School Gym, Sofia

16 August 2022

Boxscore

Finland	79–40	Ireland

St. George School Gym, Sofia

16 August 2022

Boxscore

Romania	79–73	Slovakia

St. George School Gym, Sofia

== 17th–22nd place classification ==
=== Group E ===
Pos	Team	Pld	W	L	PF	PA	PD	Pts	Qualification
1	Estonia	2	2	0	158	109	+49	4	17th place match
2	Luxembourg	2	1	1	122	147	−25	3	19th place match
3	Cyprus	2	0	2	103	127	−24	2	21st place match

Source: FIBA

18 August 2022

Boxscore

Cyprus	56–60	Luxembourg

St. George School Gym, Sofia

19 August 2022

Boxscore

Luxembourg	62–91	Estonia

St. George School Gym, Sofia

=== Group F ===
Pos	Team	Pld	W	L	PF	PA	PD	Pts	Qualification
1	Norway	2	2	0	137	117	+20	4	17th place match
2	Slovakia	2	1	1	120	113	+7	3	19th place match
3	Ireland	2	0	2	102	129	−27	2	21st place match

Source: FIBA

18 August 2022

Boxscore

Ireland	55–71	Norway

St. George School Gym, Sofia

19 August 2022

Boxscore

Norway	66–62	Slovakia

St. George School Gym, Sofia

=== 21st place match ===
20 August 2022

Boxscore

Cyprus	55–75	Ireland

Universiada Hall, Sofia

=== 19th place match ===
20 August 2022

Boxscore

Luxembourg	60–88	Slovakia

St. George School Gym, Sofia

=== 17th place match ===
20 August 2022

Boxscore

Estonia	64–66	Norway

St. George School Gym, Sofia

== 9th–16th place playoffs ==
13th place match
A3	Hungary	82
D4	Ukraine	79
15th place match
D3	Romania	83
B3	Czech Republic	75

13th–16th place semifinals
A3	Hungary	74
D3	Romania	56
B3	Czech Republic	75
D4	Ukraine	83

9th–16th place quarterfinals
A3	Hungary	56
B4	Switzerland	81
D3	Romania	56
C4	Portugal	66
B3	Czech Republic	65
A4	Georgia	87
C3	Great Britain	66
D4	Ukraine	58

9th–12th place semifinals
B4	Switzerland	62
C4	Portugal	72
A4	Georgia	47
C3	Great Britain	63

9th place match
C4	Portugal	82
C3	Great Britain	52
11th place match
B4	Switzerland	84
A4	Georgia	71

=== 9th–16th place quarterfinals ===
18 August 2022

Boxscore

Hungary	56–81	Switzerland

Triaditza Hall, Sofia

18 August 2022

Boxscore

Romania	56–66	Portugal

Triaditza Hall, Sofia

18 August 2022

Boxscore

Czech Republic	65–87	Georgia

Triaditza Hall, Sofia

18 August 2022

Boxscore

Great Britain	66–58	Ukraine

Triaditza Hall, Sofia

=== 13th–16th place semifinals ===
19 August 2022

Boxscore

Hungary	74–56	Romania

St. George School Gym, Sofia

19 August 2022

Boxscore

Czech Republic	75–83	Ukraine

Triaditza Hall, Sofia

=== 9th–12th place semifinals ===
19 August 2022

Boxscore

Switzerland	62–72	Portugal

Triaditza Hall, Sofia

19 August 2022

Boxscore

Georgia	47–63	Great Britain

Triaditza Hall, Sofia

=== 15th place match ===
20 August 2022

Boxscore

Romania	83–75	Czech Republic

St. George School Gym, Sofia

=== 13th place match ===
20 August 2022

Boxscore

Hungary	82–79	Ukraine

Triaditza Hall, Sofia

=== 11th place match ===
20 August 2022

Boxscore

Switzerland	84–71	Georgia

Triaditza Hall, Sofia

=== 9th place match ===
20 August 2022

Boxscore

Portugal	82–52	Great Britain

Triaditza Hall, Sofia

== Championship playoffs ==
5th place match
B2	Iceland	96
C1	Bosnia and Herzegovina	91
7th place match
C2	Sweden	91
A2	Austria	71

5th–8th place semifinals
B2	Iceland	92
C2	Sweden	76
A2	Austria	95
C1	Bosnia and Herzegovina	103

Quarterfinals
A1	Belgium	107
B2	Iceland	59
D1	Germany	88
C2	Sweden	86
B1	Bulgaria	96
A2	Austria	71
C1	Bosnia and Herzegovina	65
D2	Finland	75

Semifinals
A1	Belgium	79
D1	Germany	95
B1	Bulgaria	76
D2	Finland	81

Final
D1	Germany	100
D2	Finland	72
3rd place match
A1	Belgium	81
B1	Bulgaria	61

=== Quarterfinals ===
18 August 2022

Boxscore

Belgium	107–59	Iceland

Universiada Hall, Sofia

18 August 2022

Boxscore

Germany	88–86	Sweden

Universiada Hall, Sofia

18 August 2022

Boxscore

Bulgaria	96–71	Austria

Universiada Hall, Sofia

18 August 2022

Boxscore

Bosnia and Herzegovina	65–75	Finland

Universiada Hall, Sofia

=== 5th–8th place semifinals ===
19 August 2022

Boxscore

Iceland	92–76	Sweden

Universiada Hall, Sofia

19 August 2022

Boxscore

Austria	95–103	Bosnia and Herzegovina

Universiada Hall, Sofia

=== Semifinals ===
19 August 2022

Boxscore

Belgium	79–95	Germany

Universiada Hall, Sofia

19 August 2022

Boxscore

Bulgaria	76–81	Finland

Universiada Hall, Sofia

=== 7th place match ===
20 August 2022

Boxscore

Sweden	91–71	Austria

Triaditza Hall, Sofia

=== 5th place match ===
20 August 2022

Boxscore

Iceland	96–91	Bosnia and Herzegovina

Universiada Hall, Sofia

=== 3rd place match ===
20 August 2022

Boxscore

Belgium	81–61	Bulgaria

Universiada Hall, Sofia

=== Final ===
20 August 2022

Boxscore

Germany	100–72	Finland

Universiada Hall, Sofia

== Final standings ==
Rank	Team
1st place, gold medalist(s)	Germany
2nd place, silver medalist(s)	Finland
3rd place, bronze medalist(s)	Belgium
4	Bulgaria
5	Iceland
6	Bosnia and Herzegovina
7	Sweden
8	Austria
9	Portugal
10	Great Britain
11	Switzerland
12	Georgia
13	Hungary
14	Ukraine
15	Romania
16	Czech Republic
17	Norway
18	Estonia
19	Slovakia
20	Luxembourg
21	Ireland
22	Cyprus

Promoted to the 2023 FIBA U16 European Championship Division A
Signed up for the 2023 FIBA U16 European Championship Division C
