= 1973 FIBA Europe Under-16 Championship =

1973 FIBA U16 European Championship
2nd FIBA Under-16 European Basketball Championship

Tournament details
- Host country: Italy
- Dates: 19–29 July 1973
- Teams: 16 (from 1 federation)
- Venue: (in 2 host cities)

Final positions
- Champions: Soviet Union (1st title)

The 1973 FIBA Europe Under-16 Championship (known at that time as 1973 European Championship for Cadets) was the second edition of the FIBA Europe Under-16 Championship. The cities of Summonte and Angri, in Italy, hosted the tournament. The Soviet Union won their first title.

== Teams ==
- Austria
- Belgium
- Czechoslovakia
- England
- France
- Greece
- Israel
- Italy
- Poland
- Portugal
- Soviet Union
- Spain
- Sweden
- Turkey
- West Germany
- Yugoslavia

== Preliminary round ==
The sixteen teams were allocated in two groups of eight teams each.

Team advanced to Semifinals
Team competed in 5th–8th playoffs
Team competed in 9th–12th playoffs
Team competed in 13th–16th playoffs

=== Group A ===
Team	Pld	W	L	PF	PA	Pts
Spain	7	7	0	508	387	14
Yugoslavia	7	5	2	558	363	12
Turkey	7	4	3	457	345	11
France	7	4	3	466	459	11
Czechoslovakia	7	3	4	407	454	10
Sweden	7	3	4	453	490	10
Portugal	7	2	5	341	469	9
England	7	0	7	310	533	7

=== Group B ===
Team	Pld	W	L	PF	PA	Pts
Soviet Union	7	7	0	582	351	14
Italy	7	6	1	498	405	13
Greece	7	5	2	510	438	12
Israel	7	3	4	460	478	10
Poland	7	3	4	477	443	10
Belgium	7	3	4	474	503	10
Germany	7	1	6	431	528	8
Austria	7	0	7	326	612	7

== Knockout stage ==
=== 13th–16th playoffs ===
Playoffs
England	50
Germany	83
Portugal	81
Austria	52

Thirteenth place
Germany	85
Portugal	46
Fifteenth place
Austria	75
England	73

=== 9th–12th playoffs ===
Playoffs
Sweden	49
Poland	67
Belgium	68
Czechoslovakia	58

Ninth place
Poland	85
Belgium	82
Eleventh place
Czechoslovakia	61
Sweden	59

=== 5th–8th playoffs ===
Playoffs
Greece	85
France	64
Israel	70
Turkey	68

Fifth place
Israel	69
Greece	81
Seventh place
Turkey	68
France	70

=== Championship ===
Semifinals
Soviet Union	62
Yugoslavia	58
Italy	58
Spain	62

Third place
Spain	57
Soviet Union	68
Final
Italy	74
Yugoslavia	77

1973 FIBA Europe U-16 Championship

Soviet Union
First title

== Final standings ==
Rank	Team	Record
Gold medal	Soviet Union	9–0
Silver medal	Spain	8–1
Bronze medal	Yugoslavia	6–3
4th	Italy	6–3
5th	Greece	7–2
6th	Israel	4–5
7th	France	5–4
8th	Turkey	4–5
9th	Poland	5–4
10th	Belgium	4–5
11th	Czechoslovakia	4–5
12th	Sweden	3–6
13th	Germany	3–6
14th	Portugal	3–6
15th	Austria	1–8
16th	England	0–9
