= Andorra men's national under-16 basketball team =

Andorra
- FIBA zone: FIBA Europe
- National federation: Andorran Basketball Federation

U17 World Cup
- Appearances: None

U16 EuroBasket
- Appearances: None

U16 EuroBasket Division B
- Appearances: None

U16 EuroBasket Division C
- Appearances: 19
- Medals: Gold: 4 (2004, 2011, 2018, 2022); Silver: 4 (2000, 2014, 2019, 2025); Bronze: 3 (2010, 2013, 2023)

The Andorra men's national under-16 basketball team is a national basketball team of Andorra, administered by the Andorran Basketball Federation. It represents the country in under-16 men's international basketball competitions.

The team won 11 medals at the FIBA U16 EuroBasket Division C.

== FIBA U16 EuroBasket Division C record ==
Year	Position	Pld	W	L
(Malta) 2000	2nd place, silver medalist(s)	4	3	1
(Cyprus) 2002	4th	5	2	3
(Andorra) 2004	1st place, gold medalist(s)	4	4	0
(Andorra) 2006	6th	5	1	4
(Gibraltar) 2008	7th	5	2	3
(Andorra) 2010	3rd place, bronze medalist(s)	5	3	2
(San Marino) 2011	1st place, gold medalist(s)	4	4	0
(Gibraltar) 2012	5th	4	2	2
(Gibraltar) 2013	3rd place, bronze medalist(s)	4	2	2
(Malta) 2014	2nd place, silver medalist(s)	4	2	2

Year	Position	Pld	W	L
(San Marino) 2015	6th	5	2	3
(Cyprus) 2016	6th	6	3	3
(Andorra) 2017	4th	6	3	3
(San Marino) 2018	1st place, gold medalist(s)	6	5	1
(Albania) 2019	2nd place, silver medalist(s)	5	3	2
(Kosovo) 2022	1st place, gold medalist(s)	5	5	0
(Kosovo) 2023	3rd place, bronze medalist(s)	5	3	2
(Albania) 2024	Did not participate			
(Albania) 2025	2nd place, silver medalist(s)	6	4	2
(Armenia) 2026	5th	6	4	2
Total	19/20	94	57	37

== See also ==
- Andorra men's national basketball team
- Andorra men's national under-18 basketball team
- Andorra women's national under-16 basketball team
