= 2000 European Promotion Cup for Cadets =

Tournament details
- Host country: Malta
- Dates: 12–16 July 2000
- Teams: 5 (from 1 confederation)

Final positions
- Champions: Scotland (1st title)
- Runners-up: Andorra
- Third place: Malta

Official website
- www.fibaeurope.com

The 2000 European Promotion Cup for Cadets was the first edition of the basketball European Promotion Cup for Cadets, today known as the FIBA U16 European Championship Division C. It was played in Malta from 12 to 16 July 2000. Scotland national under-16 basketball team won the tournament.

== Participating teams ==
- Andorra
- Gibraltar
- Malta
- Scotland
- Wales

== Final standings ==
Pos	Team	Pld	W	L	PF	PA	PD	Pts
1	Scotland	4	4	0	327	197	+130	8
2	Andorra	4	3	1	339	262	+77	7
3	Malta	4	2	2	277	254	+23	6
4	Wales	4	1	3	258	328	−70	5
5	Gibraltar	4	0	4	177	337	−160	4

Source: FIBA Archive

== Results ==
12 July 2000

Boxscore

Gibraltar	30–109	Andorra

12 July 2000

Boxscore

Malta	81–47	Wales

13 July 2000

Boxscore

Scotland	69–27	Gibraltar

13 July 2000

Boxscore

Andorra	76–74	Malta

14 July 2000

Boxscore

Andorra	65–89	Scotland

14 July 2000

Boxscore

Wales	86–72	Gibraltar

15 July 2000

Boxscore

Wales	56–86	Scotland

15 July 2000

Boxscore

Malta	73–48	Gibraltar

16 July 2000

Boxscore

Andorra	89–69	Wales

16 July 2000

Boxscore

Scotland	83–49	Malta
