= 2010 FIBA Europe Under-16 Championship Division B =

Tournament details
- Host country: Estonia
- Teams: 20

Final positions
- Champions: Czech Republic (2nd title)

The 2010 FIBA Europe Under-16 Championship Division B was an international basketball competition held in Estonia in 2010.

== Medalists ==
1. Czech Republic

2. Ukraine

3. Slovenia

== Final ranking (comparative) ==
1. Czech Republic

2. Ukraine

3. (Georgia (country)) Georgia

4. Slovenia

5. Slovakia

6. Netherlands

7. Hungary

8. Portugal

9. Finland

10. England

11. Estonia

12. Switzerland

13. Luxembourg

14. Belgium

15. Sweden

16. Austria

17. (Republic of Ireland) Ireland

18. Romania

19. Belarus

20. Norway
