= 2006 FIBA Europe Under-16 Championship for Women Division B =

Tournament details
- Host country: Finland
- City: Jyväskylä
- Dates: 2–13 August 2006
- Teams: 17 (from 1 confederation)
- Venues: 2

Final positions
- Champions: Sweden (1st title)
- Runners-up: Latvia
- Third place: Romania

Official website
- www.fibaeurope.com

The 2006 FIBA Europe Under-16 Championship for Women Division B was the third edition of the Division B of the women's U16 European basketball championship. It was played in Jyväskylä, Finland, from 2 to 13 August 2006. Sweden women's national under-16 basketball team won the tournament.

== Participating teams ==
- Austria
- Bosnia and Herzegovina
- Bulgaria ▼ (16th place, 2005 FIBA Europe Under-16 Championship for Women Division A)
- England
- Finland
- Germany
- Iceland
- Ireland
- Israel
- Italy ▼ (15th place, 2005 FIBA Europe Under-16 Championship for Women Division A)
- Latvia
- Luxembourg
- Netherlands
- Portugal
- Romania
- Slovenia
- Sweden

== Preliminary round ==
In the preliminary round, the teams were drawn into four groups. The first two teams from each group advanced to the quarterfinal round (Groups E and F); the other teams advanced to the classification round (Groups G, H and I).

All times are local (Eastern European Summer Time – UTC+3).

=== Group A ===
Pos	Team	Pld	W	L	PF	PA	PD	Pts	Qualification
1	Germany	4	4	0	305	235	+70	8	Quarterfinal round
2	Bosnia and Herzegovina	4	2	2	285	267	+18	6	Quarterfinal round
3	Netherlands	4	2	2	260	264	−4	6	Classification round
4	Luxembourg	4	1	3	237	300	−63	5	Classification round
5	Ireland	4	1	3	267	288	−21	5	

Source: FIBA Europe

2 August 2006
17:00

Boxscore

Bosnia and Herzegovina	91–67	Luxembourg
Scoring by quarter: 22–18, 20–14, 19–22, 30–13

2 August 2006
19:15

Boxscore

Germany	70–53	Netherlands
Scoring by quarter: 21–12, 12–12, 18–14, 19–15

3 August 2006
17:00

Boxscore

Ireland	67–80	Germany
Scoring by quarter: 17–19, 17–20, 17–19, 16–22

3 August 2006
19:15

Boxscore

Netherlands	58–75	Bosnia and Herzegovina
Scoring by quarter: 15–20, 17–16, 14–11, 12–28

4 August 2006
15:45

Boxscore

Bosnia and Herzegovina	57–65	Ireland
Scoring by quarter: 17–16, 11–18, 22–19, 7–12

4 August 2006
18:00

Boxscore

Luxembourg	50–65	Netherlands
Scoring by quarter: 20–17, 12–19, 6–17, 12–12

5 August 2006
13:30

Boxscore

Germany	77–62	Bosnia and Herzegovina
Scoring by quarter: 17–19, 18–9, 21–16, 21–18

5 August 2006
15:45

Boxscore

Ireland	66–67	Luxembourg
Scoring by quarter: 18–15, 18–21, 21–13, 9–18

6 August 2006
13:30

Boxscore

Netherlands	84–69	Ireland
Scoring by quarter: 28–18, 19–18, 17–19, 20–14

6 August 2006
15:45

Boxscore

Luxembourg	53–78	Germany
Scoring by quarter: 28–25, 10–18, 11–16, 4–19

=== Group B ===
Pos	Team	Pld	W	L	PF	PA	PD	Pts	Qualification
1	Italy	3	3	0	228	160	+68	6	Quarterfinal round
2	Sweden	3	2	1	182	162	+20	5	Quarterfinal round
3	Israel	3	1	2	179	209	−30	4	Classification round
4	Portugal	3	0	3	161	219	−58	3	Classification round

Source: FIBA Europe

4 August 2006
13:00

Boxscore

Sweden	52–56 (OT)	Italy
Scoring by quarter: 7–17, 14–12, 17–11, 12–10, Overtime: 2–6

4 August 2006
17:30

Boxscore

Portugal	56–70	Israel
Scoring by quarter: 12–15, 10–18, 17–20, 17–17

5 August 2006
13:00

Boxscore

Israel	55–69	Sweden
Scoring by quarter: 18–27, 20–13, 9–15, 8–14

5 August 2006
17:30

Boxscore

Italy	88–54	Portugal
Scoring by quarter: 17–11, 33–12, 17–11, 21–20

6 August 2006
13:00

Boxscore

Israel	54–84	Italy
Scoring by quarter: 15–19, 7–24, 15–16, 17–25

6 August 2006
15:15

Boxscore

Sweden	61–51	Portugal
Scoring by quarter: 15–17, 14–17, 22–10, 10–7

=== Group C ===
Pos	Team	Pld	W	L	PF	PA	PD	Pts	Qualification
1	Romania	3	3	0	198	154	+44	6	Quarterfinal round
2	Latvia	3	2	1	226	153	+73	5	Quarterfinal round
3	England	3	1	2	183	200	−17	4	Classification round
4	Austria	3	0	3	133	233	−100	3	Classification round

Source: FIBA Europe

4 August 2006
15:15

Boxscore

Romania	69–47	England
Scoring by quarter: 22–13, 19–15, 12–9, 16–10

4 August 2006
20:15

Boxscore

Austria	28–93	Latvia
Scoring by quarter: 9–21, 2–19, 7–26, 10–27

5 August 2006
15:15

Boxscore

Latvia	55–67	Romania
Scoring by quarter: 14–20, 9–15, 15–12, 17–20

5 August 2006
19:45

Boxscore

England	78–53	Austria
Scoring by quarter: 30–9, 9–10, 27–15, 12–19

6 August 2006
17:30

Boxscore

Romania	62–52	Austria
Scoring by quarter: 21–18, 13–10, 24–5, 4–19

6 August 2006
19:45

Boxscore

Latvia	78–58	England
Scoring by quarter: 18–15, 23–9, 19–17, 18–17

=== Group D ===
Pos	Team	Pld	W	L	PF	PA	PD	Pts	Qualification
1	Slovenia	3	3	0	198	165	+33	6	Quarterfinal round
2	Bulgaria	3	2	1	218	168	+50	5	Quarterfinal round
3	Finland	3	1	2	185	183	+2	4	Classification round
4	Iceland	3	0	3	157	242	−85	3	Classification round

Source: FIBA Europe

4 August 2006
13:30

Boxscore

Slovenia	61–50	Bulgaria
Scoring by quarter: 25–15, 15–16, 13–12, 8–7

4 August 2006
20:15

Boxscore

Iceland	48–72	Finland
Scoring by quarter: 9–27, 14–6, 9–22, 16–17

5 August 2006
18:00

Boxscore

Finland	57–69	Slovenia
Scoring by quarter: 16–17, 15–10, 14–19, 12–23

5 August 2006
20:15

Boxscore

Bulgaria	102–51	Iceland
Scoring by quarter: 25–7, 21–14, 27–15, 29–15

6 August 2006
18:00

Boxscore

Slovenia	68–58	Iceland
Scoring by quarter: 20–13, 13–19, 15–12, 20–14

6 August 2006
20:15

Boxscore

Finland	56–66	Bulgaria
Scoring by quarter: 24–15, 15–14, 9–28, 8–9

== Classification round ==
In the classification round, the teams were divided into three groups of three. The winners of each group advanced to the 9th–11th place classification; the second teams advanced to the 12th–14th place classification; the third teams advanced to the 15th–17th place classification.

=== Group G ===
Pos	Team	Pld	W	L	PF	PA	PD	Pts	Qualification
1	Luxembourg	2	2	0	82	71	+11	4	9th–11th place classification
2	Netherlands	2	1	1	97	98	−1	3	12th–14th place classification
3	Austria	2	0	2	86	96	−10	2	15th–17th place classification

Source: FIBA Europe

8 August 2006
14:30

Boxscore

Netherlands	40–43	Luxembourg
Scoring by quarter: 2–9, 15–15, 11–14, 12–5

9 August 2006
19:00

Boxscore

Luxembourg	39–31	Austria
Scoring by quarter: 4–15, 15–4, 10–4, 10–8

10 August 2006
16:45

Boxscore

Austria	55–57	Netherlands
Scoring by quarter: 19–7, 19–11, 3–19, 14–20

=== Group H ===
Pos	Team	Pld	W	L	PF	PA	PD	Pts	Qualification
1	Finland	2	2	0	152	92	+60	4	9th–11th place classification
2	Ireland	2	1	1	130	122	+8	3	12th–14th place classification
3	Iceland	2	0	2	94	162	−68	2	15th–17th place classification

Source: FIBA Europe

8 August 2006
16:45

Boxscore

Finland	63–57	Ireland
Scoring by quarter: 14–17, 12–22, 15–7, 22–11

9 August 2006
14:30

Boxscore

Ireland	73–59	Iceland
Scoring by quarter: 23–17, 20–11, 17–14, 13–17

10 August 2006
19:00

Boxscore

Iceland	35–89	Finland
Scoring by quarter: 14–27, 8–22, 4–23, 9–17

=== Group I ===
Pos	Team	Pld	W	L	PF	PA	PD	Pts	Qualification
1	Israel	2	2	0	133	118	+15	4	9th–11th place classification
2	England	2	1	1	140	146	−6	3	12th–14th place classification
3	Portugal	2	0	2	116	125	−9	2	15th–17th place classification

Source: FIBA Europe

8 August 2006
19:00

Boxscore

England	69–79	Israel
Scoring by quarter: 17–24, 18–20, 15–14, 19–21

9 August 2006
16:45

Boxscore

Israel	54–49	Portugal
Scoring by quarter: 12–14, 8–11, 24–11, 10–13

10 August 2006
14:30

Boxscore

Portugal	67–71 (OT)	England
Scoring by quarter: 14–13, 10–16, 7–18, 27–11, Overtime: 9–13

== 9th–11th place classification ==
Pos	Team	Pld	W	L	PF	PA	PD	Pts
9	Finland	2	1	1	118	84	+34	3
10	Israel	2	2	0	110	113	−3	4
11	Luxembourg	2	0	2	91	122	−31	2

Source: FIBA Europe

11 August 2006
16:45

Boxscore

Luxembourg	36–60	Finland
Scoring by quarter: 7–14, 9–18, 6–14, 14–14

12 August 2006
13:00

Boxscore

Finland	58–48	Israel
Scoring by quarter: 14–14, 18–14, 11–8, 15–12

13 August 2006
15:15

Boxscore

Israel	62–55	Luxembourg
Scoring by quarter: 16–13, 12–16, 14–13, 20–13

== 12th–14th place classification ==
Pos	Team	Pld	W	L	PF	PA	PD	Pts
12	England	2	1	1	122	97	+25	3
13	Ireland	2	2	0	135	107	+28	4
14	Netherlands	2	0	2	84	137	−53	2

Source: FIBA Europe

11 August 2006
14:30

Boxscore

Netherlands	46–76	Ireland
Scoring by quarter: 12–17, 15–13, 12–23, 7–23

12 August 2006
17:30

Boxscore

Ireland	59–61	England
Scoring by quarter: 16–19, 12–12, 19–18, 12–12

13 August 2006
17:30

Boxscore

England	61–38	Netherlands
Scoring by quarter: 12–12, 12–7, 22–12, 15–7

== 15th–17th place classification ==
Pos	Team	Pld	W	L	PF	PA	PD	Pts
15	Portugal	2	1	1	133	113	+20	3
16	Austria	2	2	0	116	126	−10	4
17	Iceland	2	0	2	117	127	−10	2

Source: FIBA Europe

11 August 2006
19:00

Boxscore

Austria	61–59	Iceland
Scoring by quarter: 23–5, 14–19, 14–26, 10–9

12 August 2006
15:15

Boxscore

Iceland	58–66	Portugal
Scoring by quarter: 28–19, 4–21, 18–17, 8–9

13 August 2006
13:00

Boxscore

Portugal	67–55	Austria
Scoring by quarter: 24–13, 15–12, 15–13, 13–17

== Quarterfinal round ==
In the quarterfinal round, the teams played in two groups of four. The first two teams from each group advanced to the semifinals; the other teams advanced to the 5th–8th place playoffs.

=== Group E ===
Pos	Team	Pld	W	L	PF	PA	PD	Pts	Qualification
1	Romania	3	2	1	171	171	0	5	Semifinals
2	Sweden	3	2	1	189	157	+32	5	Semifinals
3	Germany	3	1	2	158	169	−11	4	5th–8th place playoffs
4	Bulgaria	3	1	2	169	190	−21	4	5th–8th place playoffs

Source: FIBA Europe

8 August 2006
13:30

Boxscore

Sweden	57–64	Romania
Scoring by quarter: 13–26, 18–17, 20–8, 6–13

8 August 2006
18:00

Boxscore

Germany	70–50	Bulgaria
Scoring by quarter: 20–14, 17–13, 16–9, 17–14

9 August 2006
13:30

Boxscore

Romania	57–40	Germany
Scoring by quarter: 18–16, 13–4, 19–8, 7–12

9 August 2006
15:45

Boxscore

Bulgaria	45–70	Sweden
Scoring by quarter: 9–15, 15–22, 9–20, 12–13

10 August 2006
13:30

Boxscore

Germany	48–62	Sweden
Scoring by quarter: 10–15, 14–12, 6–18, 18–17

10 August 2006
20:15

Boxscore

Romania	50–74	Bulgaria
Scoring by quarter: 17–16, 9–17, 13–23, 11–18

=== Group F ===
Pos	Team	Pld	W	L	PF	PA	PD	Pts	Qualification
1	Italy	3	2	1	204	165	+39	5	Semifinals
2	Latvia	3	2	1	218	187	+31	5	Semifinals
3	Slovenia	3	2	1	217	206	+11	5	5th–8th place playoffs
4	Bosnia and Herzegovina	3	0	3	146	227	−81	3	5th–8th place playoffs

Source: FIBA Europe

8 August 2006
15:45

Boxscore

Italy	59–63	Latvia
Scoring by quarter: 14–15, 9–25, 23–6, 13–17

8 August 2006
20:15

Boxscore

Bosnia and Herzegovina	56–77	Slovenia
Scoring by quarter: 11–17, 9–24, 9–24, 27–12

9 August 2006
18:00

Boxscore

Latvia	78–50	Bosnia and Herzegovina
Scoring by quarter: 21–11, 21–12, 16–7, 20–20

9 August 2006
20:15

Boxscore

Slovenia	62–73	Italy
Scoring by quarter: 19–12, 10–18, 11–20, 22–23

10 August 2006
15:45

Boxscore

Bosnia and Herzegovina	40–72	Italy
Scoring by quarter: 16–16, 7–19, 7–18, 10–19

10 August 2006
18:00

Boxscore

Latvia	77–78	Slovenia
Scoring by quarter: 21–18, 15–24, 21–19, 20–17

== 5th–8th place playoffs ==
5th–8th place semifinals
E3	Germany	49
F4	Bosnia and Herzegovina	59
E4	Bulgaria	56
F3	Slovenia	73

5th place match
F4	Bosnia and Herzegovina	48
F3	Slovenia	74
7th place match
E3	Germany	61
E4	Bulgaria	62

=== 5th–8th place semifinals ===
12 August 2006
13:30

Boxscore

Germany	49–59	Bosnia and Herzegovina
Scoring by quarter: 13–15, 9–15, 7–13, 20–16

12 August 2006
15:45

Boxscore

Bulgaria	56–73	Slovenia
Scoring by quarter: 8–17, 20–29, 21–13, 7–14

=== 7th place match ===
13 August 2006
13:30

Boxscore

Germany	61–62	Bulgaria
Scoring by quarter: 10–11, 17–19, 20–23, 14–9

=== 5th place match ===
13 August 2006
15:45

Boxscore

Bosnia and Herzegovina	48–74	Slovenia
Scoring by quarter: 10–16, 11–19, 15–18, 12–21

== Championship playoffs ==
Semifinals
E1	Romania	60
F2	Latvia	81
E2	Sweden	64
F1	Italy	58

Finals
F2	Latvia	62
E2	Sweden	72
3rd place match
E1	Romania	72
F1	Italy	63

=== Semifinals ===
12 August 2006
18:00

Boxscore

Romania	60–81	Latvia
Scoring by quarter: 19–25, 12–12, 20–18, 9–26

12 August 2006
20:15

Boxscore

Sweden	64–58	Italy
Scoring by quarter: 13–11, 20–16, 13–9, 18–22

=== 3rd place match ===
13 August 2006
18:00

Boxscore

Romania	72–63	Italy
Scoring by quarter: 12–15, 18–19, 18–12, 24–17

=== Final ===
13 August 2006
20:15

Boxscore

Latvia	62–72	Sweden
Scoring by quarter: 21–9, 16–24, 21–17, 4–22

== Final standings ==
Rank	Team
1st place, gold medalist(s)	Sweden
2nd place, silver medalist(s)	Latvia
3rd place, bronze medalist(s)	Romania
4	Italy
5	Slovenia
6	Bosnia and Herzegovina
7	Bulgaria
8	Germany
9	Finland
10	Israel
11	Luxembourg
12	England
13	Ireland
14	Netherlands
15	Portugal
16	Austria
17	Iceland

Promoted to the 2007 FIBA Europe Under-16 Championship for Women Division A
