= Cyprus men's national under-16 basketball team =

Cyprus
- FIBA zone: FIBA Europe
- National federation: Cyprus Basketball Federation

U17 World Cup
- Appearances: None

U16 EuroBasket
- Appearances: None

U16 EuroBasket Division B
- Appearances: 12
- Medals: None

U16 EuroBasket Division C
- Appearances: 5
- Medals: Gold: 4 (2002, 2010, 2016, 2023); Bronze: 1 (2006)
Home	Away

The Cyprus men's national under-16 basketball team is a national basketball team of Cyprus, administered by the Cyprus Basketball Federation. It represents the country in international under-16 men's basketball competitions.

The team won several medals at the FIBA U16 EuroBasket Division C.

== FIBA U16 EuroBasket participations ==
Year	Division B	Division C
2002		1st place, gold medalist(s)
2004	15th/16th	
2005	17th	
2006		3rd place, bronze medalist(s)
2007	8th	
2008	20th	
2010		1st place, gold medalist(s)
2011	18th	
2016		1st place, gold medalist(s)

Year	Division B	Division C
2017	22nd	
2018	21st	
2019	18th	
2022	22nd	
2023		1st place, gold medalist(s)
2024	20th	
2025	19th	
2026	19th	

== See also ==
- Cyprus men's national basketball team
- Cyprus men's national under-18 basketball team
- Cyprus women's national under-16 basketball team
