= Basketball Wales =

Governing body of basketball in Wales

Basketball Wales Pêl-fasged Cymru
- Sport: Basketball
- Jurisdiction: National
- Founded: 2008
- Affiliation: FIBA
- Chairperson: Keith Mair
- Replaced: The Basketball Association of Wales
- (founded): 1952

Official website
- www.basketball.wales
- (Wales)

Basketball Wales (Welsh: Pêl-fasged Cymru) (founded in 1952 as the Basketball Association of Wales) is the sole controller and the national governing body of all aspects of the game of basketball in Wales. It is responsible for the management of the Basketball Wales National League, the national teams and for the organisation of all national and international basketball competitions held in Wales.

Basketball Wales is a national affiliated federation of FIBA Europe and the International Basketball Federation (FIBA).

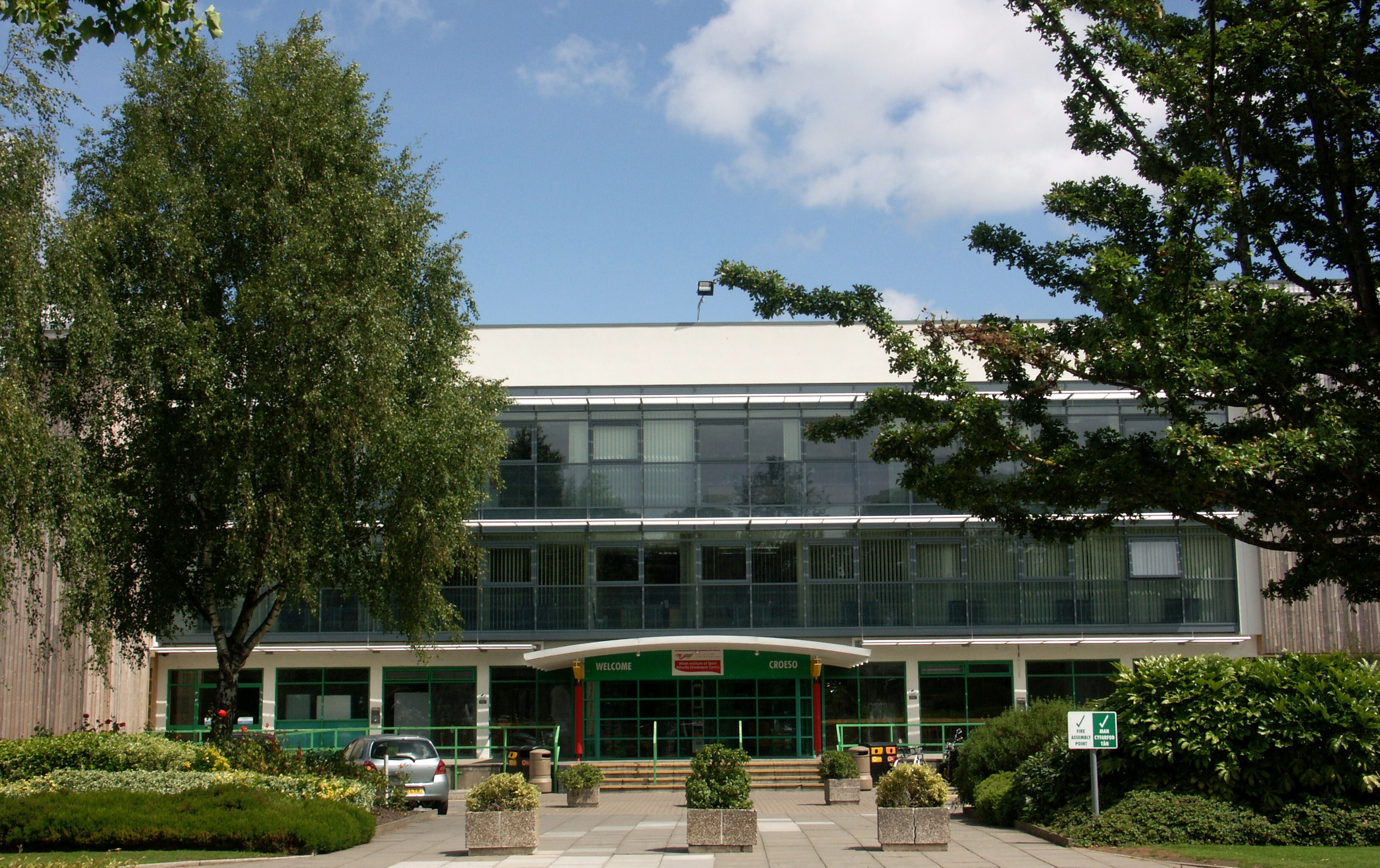
Sport Wales National Centre, Cardiff home to Basketball Wales

== See also ==
- Wales national basketball team
- Basketball Wales National League
