= Wales women's national under-16 basketball team =

Wales
- FIBA zone: FIBA Europe
- National federation: Basketball Wales

U17 World Cup
- Appearances: None

U16 EuroBasket
- Appearances: None

U16 EuroBasket Division B
- Appearances: None

U16 EuroBasket Division C
- Appearances: 8
- Medals: None

The Wales women's national under-16 basketball team is a national basketball team of Wales, administered by Basketball Wales. It represents the country in women's international under-16 basketball competitions.

The team participated 8 times at the FIBA U16 Women's European Championship Division C. The best result is the fourth place in 2014, 2015 and 2017.

== See also ==
- Wales women's national basketball team
- Wales women's national under-18 basketball team
- Wales men's national under-16 basketball team
