= 2019–20 Brose Bamberg season =

German basketball season

Brose Bamberg
2019–20 season
- Chairman: Norbert Sieben
- Head coach: Roel Moors
- Arena: Brose Arena
- Basketball Bundesliga: Scheduled
- BBL-Pokal: Round of 16
- Basketball Champions League: Regular season
Home	Away	Third
- All statistics correct as of 10 August 2019.

The 2019–20 Brose Bamberg season is the 65th season in the existence of the club. The club will play in the Basketball Bundesliga (BBL) and BBL-Pokal, as well as in Europe in the Basketball Champions League.

On 20 June 2019, Bamberg announced that Roel Moors had signed a two-year contract to become the club's new head coach.

== Players ==
=== Squad information ===
Brose Bamberg roster
Players
Coaches

Pos.	No.	Nat.	Name	Ht.	Wt.	Age
PG	1	(United States)	Lee, Paris	1.83 m (6 ft 0 in)	84 kg (185 lb)	31 – 20 April 1995
G	2	(Germany)	Weidemann, Nelson	1.91 m (6 ft 3 in)	84 kg (185 lb)	27 – 25 March 1999
G/F	7	(United States)	Taylor, Kameron	1.98 m (6 ft 6 in)	95 kg (209 lb)	31 – 5 October 1994
SF	11	(United States)	McLean, Tre	1.96 m (6 ft 5 in)	93 kg (205 lb)	32 – 19 October 1993
F	16	(Germany)	Olinde, Louis	2.05 m (6 ft 9 in)	82 kg (181 lb)	28 – 19 March 1998
C	20	(Germany)	Harris, Elias (C)	2.03 m (6 ft 8 in)	108 kg (238 lb)	37 – 6 July 1989
SG	27	(United States)	Crawford, Jordan	1.93 m (6 ft 4 in)	104 kg (229 lb)	37 – 23 October 1988
PG	32	(Belgium)	Obasohan, Retin	1.85 m (6 ft 1 in)	94 kg (207 lb)	33 – 6 July 1993
PF	43	(Germany)	Sengfelder, Christian	2.06 m (6 ft 9 in)	112 kg (247 lb)	31 – 28 February 1995
G	44	(United States)	Taylor, Bryce (injured)	1.95 m (6 ft 5 in)	95 kg (209 lb)	39 – 27 September 1986
C	50	(Egypt)	Marei, Assem	2.06 m (6 ft 9 in)	113 kg (249 lb)	34 – 16 June 1992
F/C	55	(United States)	Atkins, Darion	2.03 m (6 ft 8 in)	104 kg (229 lb)	33 – 17 September 1992

Head coach

- (Belgium) Roel Moors

Assistant coach(es)

- (Belgium) Thomas Crab
- (Germany) Dominik Günthner

Legend

- (C) Team captain
- Injured

- Roster
Updated: 26 December 2019

Note: Flags indicate national team eligibility at FIBA-sanctioned events. Players may hold other non-FIBA nationalities not displayed.

=== Depth chart ===
Pos.	Starting 5	Bench 1	Bench 2
C	Assem Marei	Darion Atkins
PF	Christian Sengfelder	Louis Olinde	Mateo Seric
SF	Kameron Taylor	Elias Harris
SG	Jordan Crawford	Tre McLean	Bryce Taylor
PG	Paris Lee	Retin Obasohan	Nelson Weidemann

=== Transactions ===
==== In ====
No.	Pos.	Nat.	Name	Age	Moving from		Type	Ends	Date	Source
1	PG	(United States)	Paris Lee	24	Antwerp Giants	(Belgium)	Free	2021	29 June 2019	
7	SF	(United States)	Kameron Taylor	24	PVSK Panthers	(Hungary)	Free	2020	3 July 2019	
11	F	(United States)	Tre McLean	25	Parma	(Russia)	Free	2021	5 July 2019	
50	C	(Egypt)	Assem Marei	27	Pınar Karşıyaka	(Turkey)	Free	2021	19 July 2019	
2	PG	(Germany)	Nelson Weidemann	20	Bayern Munich	(Germany)	Loan	2021	22 July 2019	
10	SG	(Spain)	Aleix Font	21	Barcelona	(Spain)	Loan	2020	2 August 2019	
42	PF	(Venezuela)	Michael Carrera	26	Trotamundos	(Venezuela)	Free	2020	20 September 2019	
27	SG	(United States)	Jordan Crawford	31	Free agent		Free	2020	25 February 2020	

==== Out ====
No.	Pos.	Nat.	Name	Age	Moving to		Type	Date	Source
0	PG	(United States)	Tyrese Rice	32	Panathinaikos	(Greece)	End of contract	1 July 2019	
12	G/F	(Germany)	Daniel Schmidt	28	Skyliners Frankfurt	(Germany)	End of contract	6 August 2019	
0	G/F	(Estonia)	Henri Drell	21	VL Pesaro	(Italy)	End of contract	14 July 2019	
1	PG	(Greece)	Nikos Zisis	35	Joventut	(Spain)	End of contract	15 July 2019	
33	SF	(Germany)	Patrick Heckmann	27	ratiopharm Ulm	(Germany)	End of contract	1 July 2019	
21	F/C	(United States)	Augustine Rubit	29	Olympiacos	(Greece)	End of contract	8 July 2019	
42	PF	(Venezuela)	Michael Carrera	26	Free agent		Termination	19 November 2019	

== Pre-season ==
Brose Bamberg began its pre-season on 21 August 2019.
Win Loss

21 August 2019 1	Brose Bamberg (Germany)	109–52	(Czech Republic) Armex Děčín	Bamberg
		Report

30 August 2019 2	Brose Bamberg (Germany)	86–83	(Germany) EWE Baskets Oldenburg	Belgrade
		Report		Attendance: 0

1 September 2019 4	Crvena zvezda (Serbia)	90–74	(Germany) Brose Bamberg	Belgrade
		Report		Attendance: 0
