= Herkenhoff =

Herkenhoff is a surname. Its geographic origin may be the region on the current border area between Germany and the Netherlands. The origin and meaning of the name is uncertain. It could be explained through Dutch, German or dialectic words. The second part of the name surely means "yard". The first part could mean Herke [a goddess], Herken [German dialect, meaning "little lord"] or even "herkennen" [Dutch: "to get to know"].

== Geographic spreading of this family name ==
Many Herkenhoff families have their roots in the municipality of Hagen a.T.W. near Osnabrück, in the federal state of Lower Saxony, Germany. In the 19th century many families emigrated to Brazil, and the United States where there can be found quite a lot of Herkenhoff families as well and where forms of Low German are also spoken.

== People ==
- James Herkenhoff, Decorated War Veteran
- Joao Baptista Herkenhoff, Brazilian Human rights writer and judge
- Matt Herkenhoff (born 1959), American football player
- Paulo Herkenhoff, Museum of Modern Art
- Philipp Herkenhoff (born 1999), German basketball player
- Regina Herkenhoff, Brazilian Chronicle writer
- Ulrich Herkenhoff, Pan flute player
