= 2015 FIBA Europe Under-16 Championship =

2015 FIBA U16 European Championship
29th FIBA Under-16 European Basketball Championship

Tournament details
- Host country: Lithuania
- Dates: 6 – 16 August 2015
- Teams: 16
- Venue: 2 (in 1 host city)

Final positions
- Champions: Bosnia and Herzegovina (1st title)

Tournament statistics
- MVP: (Bosnia and Herzegovina) Džanan Musa
- Top scorer: (Bosnia and Herzegovina) Musa (23.0)
- Top rebounds: (Turkey) Duran (12.1)
- Top assists: (Bosnia and Herzegovina) Musa (6.3)

Official website
- FIBA Archive

The 2015 FIBA Europe Under-16 Championship was the 29th edition of the European Under-16 Basketball Championship. 16 teams participated in the competition, held in Kaunas, Lithuania in two venues (Arvydas Sabonis Basketball Centre and the legendary Kaunas Sports Hall), from 8 to 16 August 2015. France was the defending champions. The logo was created by Kaunas-based designer Aleksejus Kudinovas. It symbolizes Kaunas – a city rich in greenery and where basketball reigns.

== Venues ==
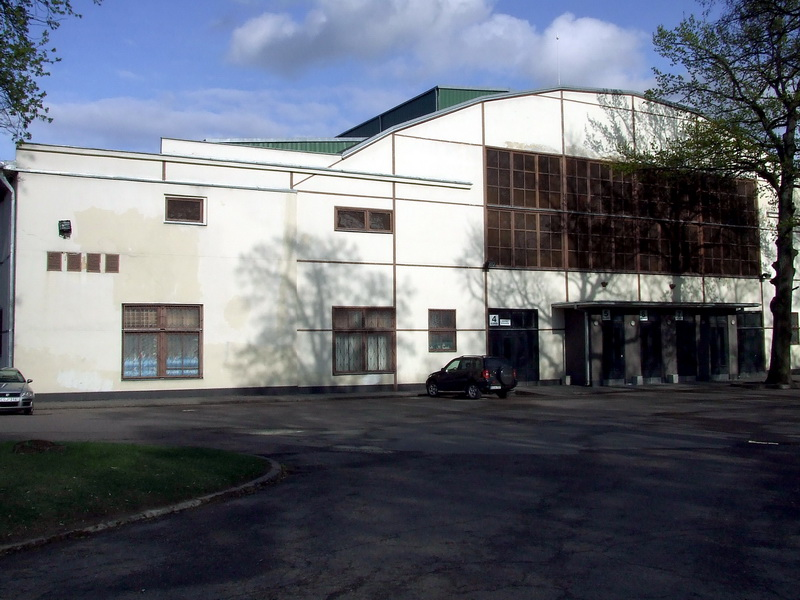
Kaunas Sports Hall

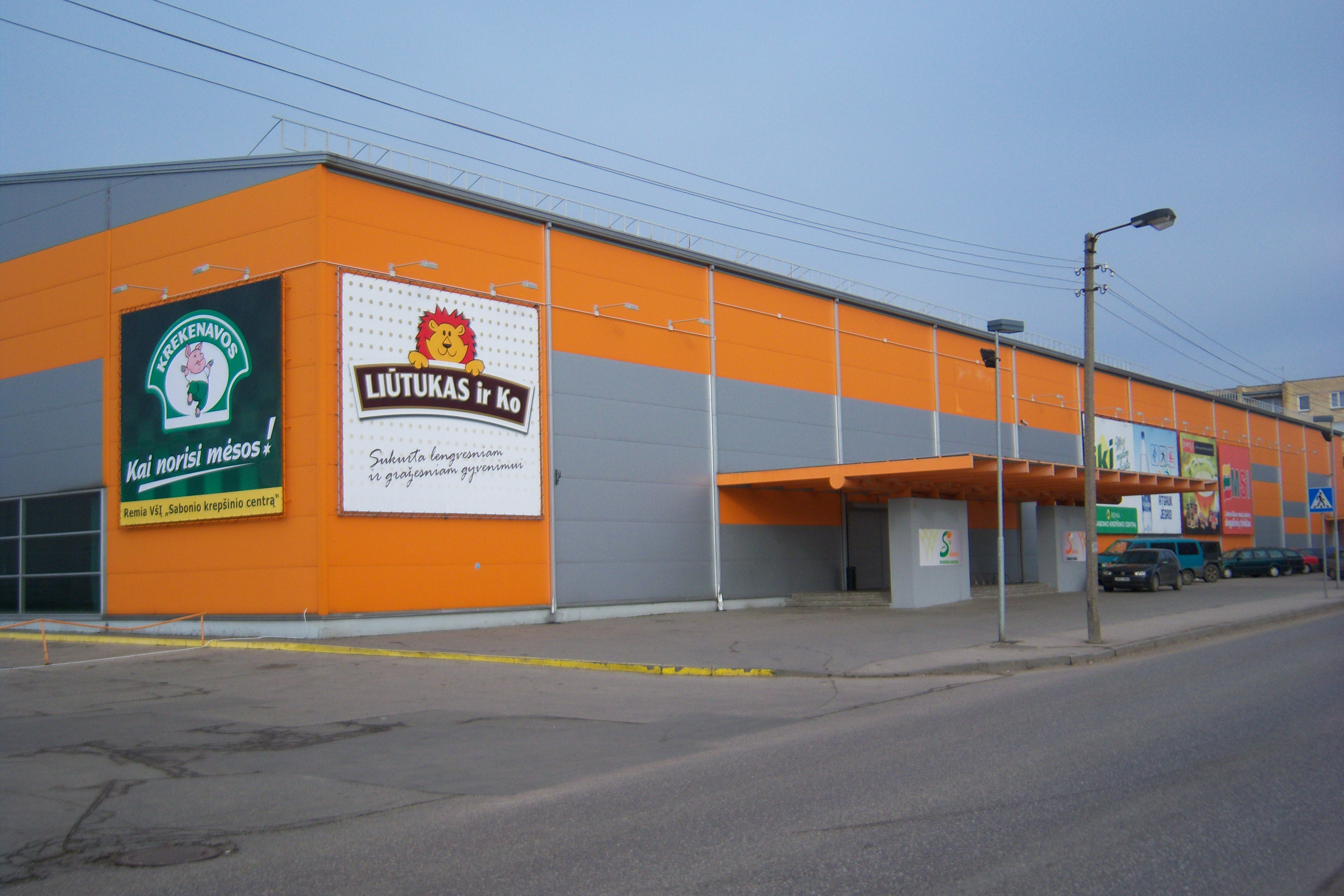
Arvydas Sabonis Basketball Centre

== Participating teams ==
- Bosnia and Herzegovina
- Croatia
- England ▲ (3rd place, 2014 FIBA Europe Under-16 Championship Division B)
- Finland
- France
- Germany
- Greece
- Israel ▲ (Runners-up, 2014 FIBA Europe Under-16 Championship Division B)
- Italy
- Latvia
- Lithuania
- Montenegro ▲ (Winners, 2014 FIBA Europe Under-16 Championship Division B)
- Russia
- Serbia
- Spain
- Turkey

== First round ==
In this round, sixteen teams are allocated in four groups of four teams each. The top three teams of each group will advance to the Qualifying Round. The last teams will play in the Classification Group G first, then in the 9th–16th place playoffs.

Team advances to the Second Round
Team will compete in the Classification Group G

=== Group A ===
Pos	Team	Pld	W	L	PF	PA	PD	Pts	Qualification
1	Turkey	3	3	0	185	122	+63	6	Advance to second round
2	Germany	3	2	1	126	130	−4	5	Advance to second round
3	England	3	1	2	153	152	+1	4	Advance to second round
4	Russia	3	0	3	0	60	−60	0 (Note: Russian Basketball Federation has been suspended from FIBA)	Classification Group G

Source: FIBA Archive
Notes:

6 August 2015
14:30 (NOT PLAYED)

Boxscore

Turkey	20–0	Russia

Arvydas Sabonis Basketball Centre – Kaunas (LTU)

6 August 2015
19:00

Boxscore

Germany	61–56	England
Scoring by quarter: 15–14, 11–14, 16–10, 19–18
Pts: Herkenhoff 13; Rebs: Herkenhoff 8 Asts: Döding 2		Pts: Boachie-Yiadom 16; Rebs: Iwowo 8 Asts: Iwowo, Edwards 4

Arvydas Sabonis Basketball Centre – Kaunas (LTU)
Attendance: 150
Referees: Dragan Neskovic (SRB), Gintaras Vitkauskas (LTU), Ernad Karovic (BIH)

7 August 2015
14:30 (NOT PLAYED)

Boxscore

Russia	0–20	Germany

Kaunas Sports Hall – Kaunas (LTU)

7 August 2015
16:45

Boxscore

England	77–91	Turkey
Scoring by quarter: 24–31, 23–21, 13–22, 17–17
Pts: Bett, Boachie-Yiadom 15; Rebs: Boachie-Yiadom 10; Asts: 4 players 3		Pts: Bitim 30; Rebs: Atar 11; Asts: Avsar 4

Kaunas Sports Hall – Kaunas (LTU)
Attendance: 200
Referees: Milos Koljensic (MNE), Josip Radojkovic (CRO), Michele Rossi (ITA)

8 August 2015
14:30

Boxscore

Turkey	74–45	Germany
Scoring by quarter: 15–6, 15–12, 22–7, 22–20
Pts: Bitim 25; Rebs: Duran 12; Asts: Bitim 2		Pts: Buck 10; Rebs: Drescher 11; Asts: 3 players 2

Kaunas Sports Hall – Kaunas (LTU)
Attendance: 100
Referees: Francisco Araña (ESP), Milos Koljensic (MNE), Michele Rossi (ITA)

8 August 2015
14:30 (NOT PLAYED)

Boxscore

England	20–0	Russia

Arvydas Sabonis Basketball Centre – Kaunas (LTU)

=== Group B ===
Pos	Team	Pld	W	L	PF	PA	PD	Pts	Qualification
1	Lithuania	3	3	0	231	182	+49	6	Advance to second round
2	Spain	3	2	1	217	201	+16	5	Advance to second round
3	Greece	3	1	2	189	206	−17	4	Advance to second round
4	Israel	3	0	3	212	260	−48	3	Classification Group G

Source: FIBA Archive

6 August 2015
19:00

Boxscore

Spain	61–66	Lithuania
Scoring by quarter: 13–16, 17–11, 18–20, 13–19
Pts: Martínez 21; Rebs: Salvador 7 Asts: 3 players 2		Pts: Sargiūnas, Velička, Vasiliauskas 9 Rebs: Velička 10; Asts: Velička 5

Kaunas Sports Hall, Kaunas (LTU)
Attendance: 1,200
Referees: Piotr Pastusiak (POL), Milos Koljensic (MNE), Yener Yilmaz (TUR)

6 August 2015
21:15

Boxscore

Greece	80–65	Israel
Scoring by quarter: 22–14, 8–17, 26–18, 24–16
Pts: Moraitis 22; Rebs: Vlagkogias 14; Asts: Moraitis 5		Pts: Ebo 21; Rebs: Suss 7 Asts: Shabat, Ebo 4

Kaunas Sports Hall, Kaunas (LTU)
Attendance: 100
Referees: Roberto Chiari (ITA), Haydn Jones (WAL), Josip Radojkovic (CRO)

7 August 2015
19:00

Boxscore

Lithuania	69–51	Greece
Scoring by quarter: 17–13, 21–2, 21–18, 10–18
Pts: Uleckas 18; Rebs: 3 players 6 Asts: Velička 4		Pts: Moraitis 19; Rebs: Moraitis 8 Asts: Moraitis 4

Kaunas Sports Hall, Kaunas (LTU)
Attendance: 1,100
Referees: Roberto Chiari (ITA), Paulo Marques (POR), Miroslav Tomov (BUL)

7 August 2015
21:15

Boxscore

Israel	77–84	Spain
Scoring by quarter: 20–19, 12–13, 21–21, 24–21
Pts: Ebo 24; Rebs: Porat 9 Asts: Ebo, Parker Amitay 4		Pts: Martínez 25; Rebs: Martínez 14; Asts: González 5

Arvydas Sabonis Basketball Centre, Kaunas (LTU)
Attendance: 110
Referees: Dragan Neskovic (SRB), Aleksandar Milojevic (MKD), Martins Kozlovskis (LAT)

8 August 2015
16:45

Boxscore

Israel	70–96	Lithuania
Scoring by quarter: 17–30, 21–28, 12–22, 20–16
Pts: Levinson 15; Rebs: Suss 8 Asts: Suss 4		Pts: Sargiūnas 17; Rebs: Balčiūnas 9 Asts: Uleckas, Velička 5

Kaunas Sports Hall, Kaunas (LTU)
Attendance: 800
Referees: Haydn Jones (WAL), Miroslav Tomov (BUL), Josip Radojkovic (CRO)

8 August 2015
21:15

Boxscore

Spain	72–58	Greece
Scoring by quarter: 12–14, 18–13, 19–13, 23–18
Pts: Martínez 23; Rebs: Martínez 11; Asts: González 8		Pts: Moraitis 18; Rebs: 3 players 5 Asts: Moraitis 5

Arvydas Sabonis Basketball Centre, Kaunas (LTU)
Attendance: 120
Referees: Dragan Neskovic (SRB), Yohan Rosso (FRA), Ernad Karovic (BIH)

=== Group C ===
Pos	Team	Pld	W	L	PF	PA	PD	Pts	Qualification
1	Finland	3	2	1	217	211	+6	5 (Note: Finland–Bosnia and Herzegovina 82–78)	Advance to second round
2	Bosnia and Herzegovina	3	2	1	231	203	+28	5	Advance to second round
3	Serbia	3	1	2	200	223	−23	4 (Note: Serbia–Italy 79–77)	Advance to second round
4	Italy	3	1	2	210	221	−11	4	Classification Group G

Source: FIBA Archive
Notes:

6 August 2015
14:15

Boxscore

Serbia	56–76	Bosnia and Herzegovina
Scoring by quarter: 21–18, 14–23, 9–20, 12–15
Pts: Matić 13; Rebs: Petrušev 9 Asts: Uskoković, Novaković 3		Pts: Musa 27; Rebs: Sikiraš 7 Asts: Musa 5

Kaunas Sports Hall, Kaunas (LTU)
Attendance: 100
Referees: Tomas Jasevicius (LTU), Yohan Rosso (FRA), Martins Kozlovskis (LAT)

6 August 2015
16:30

Boxscore

Italy	68–65	Finland
Scoring by quarter: 15–13, 17–17, 14–12, 22–23
Pts: Trapani 20; Rebs: Ebeling 8 Asts: Pajola 9		Pts: Valtonen 25; Rebs: Valtonen 10; Asts: Heinonen 4

Kaunas Sports Hall, Kaunas (LTU)
Attendance: 300
Referees: Keith Williams (ENG), Aleksandar Milojevic (MKD), Miroslav Tomov (BUL)

7 August 2015
14:30

Boxscore

Bosnia and Herzegovina	77–65	Italy
Scoring by quarter: 25–14, 25–5, 16–21, 11–25
Pts: Musa 23; Rebs: Musa 19; Asts: Musa 7		Pts: Caruso 16; Rebs: Caruso 13; Asts: Trapani 3

Arvydas Sabonis Basketball Centre, Kaunas (LTU)
Attendance: 114
Referees: Francisco Araña (ESP), Amit Balak (ISR), Yohan Rosso (FRA)

7 August 2015
16:45

Boxscore

Finland	70–65	Serbia
Scoring by quarter: 17–9, 23–13, 9–23, 21–20
Pts: Valtonen 25; Rebs: Valtonen, R. Waxlax 10; Asts: Valtonen, Heinonen 4		Pts: Uskoković, Latinović 20; Rebs: Petrušev 13; Asts: Marjanović 4

Arvydas Sabonis Basketball Centre, Kaunas (LTU)
Attendance: 150
Referees: Marek Cmikiewicz (POL), Keith Williams (ENG), Gintaras Vitkauskas (LTU)

8 August 2015
16:45

Boxscore

Serbia	79–77	Italy
Scoring by quarter: 21–19, 18–24, 23–19, 17–15
Pts: Pecarski 25; Rebs: Pecarski 14; Asts: Uskoković 5		Pts: Stefanini 24; Rebs: Serpilli 10; Asts: Stefanini, Serpilli 3

Arvydas Sabonis Basketball Centre, Kaunas (LTU)
Attendance: 100
Referees: Paulo Marques (POR), Marek Cmikiewicz (POL), Marius Ciulin (ROU)

8 August 2015
19:00

Boxscore

Finland	82–78	Bosnia and Herzegovina
Scoring by quarter: 21–16, 23–23, 19–20, 19–19
Pts: R. Waxlax 20; Rebs: Heinonen 8 Asts: Heinonen, E.Waxlax 6		Pts: Campara 24; Rebs: Mutić, Barukcija 8 Asts: Campara 5

Arvydas Sabonis Basketball Centre, Kaunas (LTU)
Attendance: 140
Referees: Petros Papapetrou (GRE), Yener Yilmaz (TUR), Martins Kozlovskis (LAT)

=== Group D ===
Pos	Team	Pld	W	L	PF	PA	PD	Pts	Qualification
1	France	3	3	0	177	158	+19	6	Advance to second round
2	Montenegro	3	2	1	186	170	+16	5	Advance to second round
3	Croatia	3	1	2	197	190	+7	4	Advance to second round
4	Latvia	3	0	3	146	188	−42	3	Classification Group G

Source: FIBA Archive

6 August 2015
16:45

Boxscore

France	66–61	Croatia
Scoring by quarter: 23–20, 21–18, 11–16, 11–7
Pts: Blanc 17; Rebs: Bazille 10; Asts: Mopsus 5		Pts: Jordano 15; Rebs: Šarić 5 Asts: 3 players 2

Arvydas Sabonis Basketball Centre, Kaunas (LTU)
Attendance: 120
Referees: Francisco Araña (ESP), Paulo Marques (POR), Amit Balak (ISR)

6 August 2015
21:15

Boxscore

Latvia	47–64	Montenegro
Scoring by quarter: 9–4, 14–23, 12–22, 12–15
Pts: Kalnins 12; Rebs: Miska 8 Asts: Zagars 4		Pts: Slavković 24; Rebs: Čepić 9 Asts: 3 players 2

Arvydas Sabonis Basketball Centre, Kaunas (LTU)
Attendance: 80
Referees: Marek Cmikiewicz (POL), Marius Ciulin (ROU), Jonathon Ross Chapman (AUS)

7 August 2015
19:00

Boxscore

Croatia	77–64	Latvia
Scoring by quarter: 22–8, 19–17, 15–20, 21–19
Pts: Bajo 18; Rebs: Nakić 10; Asts: Jordano 8		Pts: Kalnins 13; Rebs: Lacis 9 Asts: Kurucs 5

Arvydas Sabonis Basketball Centre, Kaunas (LTU)
Attendance: 120
Referees: Marius Ciulin (ROU), Petros Papapetrou (GRE), Yener Yilmaz (TUR)

7 August 2015
21:15

Boxscore

Montenegro	62–64	France
Scoring by quarter: 15–20, 17–14, 20–11, 10–19
Pts: Slavković 17; Rebs: Popović, Čepić 6 Asts: Slavković 4		Pts: Fevrier 18; Rebs: Fevrier 7 Asts: Mopsus 4

Kaunas Sports Hall, Kaunas (LTU)
Attendance: 100
Referees: Piotr Pastusiak (POL), Tomas Jasevicius (LTU), Haydn Jones (WAL)

8 August 2015
19:00

Boxscore

Montenegro	60–59	Croatia
Scoring by quarter: 13–15, 14–15, 20–21, 13–8
Pts: Slavković 20; Rebs: Milosević 8 Asts: Milosević, Titić 2		Pts: Bajo 26; Rebs: Bajo 10; Asts: Jordano, Jularić 3

Kaunas Sports Hall, Kaunas (LTU)
Attendance: 100
Referees: Roberto Chiari (ITA), Gintaras Vitkauskas (LTU), Amit Balak (ISR)

8 August 2015
21:15

Boxscore

France	47–35	Latvia
Scoring by quarter: 14–6, 7–10, 9–11, 17–8
Pts: Blanc 16; Rebs: Dorez 8 Asts: Mopsus, Beyhurst 4		Pts: Kaufmanis 7 Rebs: Kalnins 9 Asts: Kurucs 2

Kaunas Sports Hall, Kaunas (LTU)
Attendance: 100
Referees: Piotr Pastusiak (POL), Aleksandar Milojevic (MKD), Jonathon Ross Chapman (AUS)

== Second round ==
Twelve advancing teams from the First Round will be allocated in two groups of six teams each. The top four teams of each group will advance to the quarterfinals. The last two teams of each group will play in the 9th – 16th place playoffs against the teams from the Group G.

Team advances to the Quarterfinals
Team will compete in the 9th – 16th place playoffs

=== Group E ===
Pos	Team	Pld	W	L	PF	PA	PD	Pts	Qualification
1	Spain	5	4	1	359	306	+53	9 (Note: Turkey–Spain 64–75)	Advance to Quarterfinals
2	Turkey	5	4	1	383	324	+59	9	Advance to Quarterfinals
3	Germany	5	3	2	314	335	−21	8 (Note: Germany–Lithuania 77–70)	Advance to Quarterfinals
4	Lithuania	5	3	2	371	323	+48	8	Advance to Quarterfinals
5	England	5	1	4	324	379	−55	6	9th – 16th place playoffs
6	Greece	5	0	5	281	365	−84	5	9th – 16th place playoffs

Source: FIBA Archive
Notes:

10 August 2015
19:00

Boxscore

Greece	63–87	Turkey
Scoring by quarter: 9–28, 22–21, 21–18, 11–20
Pts: Moraitis 25; Rebs: Moraitis 11; Asts: Kapris, Psaras 3		Pts: Bitim 32; Rebs: Duran 18; Asts: Bitim, Avsar 5

Arvydas Sabonis Basketball Centre, Kaunas (LTU)
Attendance: 110
Referees: Roberto Chiari (ITA), Milos Koljensic (MNE), Aleksandar Milojevic (MKD)

10 August 2015
19:00

Boxscore

England	67–102	Lithuania
Scoring by quarter: 18–17, 15–24, 19–31, 15–30
Pts: Edwards 11; Rebs: Boachie-Yiadom 7 Asts: Round, Sharman 2		Pts: Vasiliauskas 16; Rebs: Kišūnas 10; Asts: Velička 5

Kaunas Sports Hall, Kaunas (LTU)
Attendance: 1000
Referees: Yener Yilmaz (TUR), Jonathon Ross Chapman (AUS), Michele Rossi (ITA)

10 August 2015
21:15

Boxscore

Spain	76–54	Germany
Scoring by quarter: 12–10, 19–22, 25–11, 20–11
Pts: Martínez 29; Rebs: Salvador 10; Asts: Martínez 3		Pts: Bonga 11; Rebs: Bonga 7 Asts: Herkenhoff 4

Arvydas Sabonis Basketball Centre, Kaunas (LTU)
Attendance: 150
Referees: Dragan Neskovic (SRB), Gintaras Vitkauskas (LTU), Ernad Karovic (BIH)

11 August 2015
16:45

Boxscore

Greece	50–60	England
Scoring by quarter: 13–7, 11–19, 6–16, 20–18
Pts: Moraitis 25; Rebs: Moraitis 11; Asts: 6 players 1		Pts: Bett 20; Rebs: Boachie-Yiadom 15; Asts: Round, Iwowo 4

Kaunas Sports Hall, Kaunas (LTU)
Attendance: 200
Referees: Milos Koljensic (MNE), Yohan Rosso (FRA), Martins Kozlovskis (LAT)

11 August 2015
19:00

Boxscore

Germany	77–70	Lithuania
Scoring by quarter: 12–19, 19–17, 24–11, 22–23
Pts: Drescher 17; Rebs: Herkenhoff 10; Asts: Bonga 6		Pts: Vasiliauskas 15; Rebs: Sargiūnas 5 Asts: Velička 5

Kaunas Sports Hall, Kaunas (LTU)
Attendance: 1100
Referees: Keith Williams (ENG), Haydn Jones (WAL), Jonathon Ross Chapman (AUS)

11 August 2015
21:15

Boxscore

Turkey	64–75	Spain
Scoring by quarter: 17–23, 15–14, 20–17, 12–21
Pts: Bitim 16; Rebs: Afsar 7 Asts: Avsar 4		Pts: Salvador 15; Rebs: Salvador 9 Asts: Salvador, González 4

Kaunas Sports Hall, Kaunas (LTU)
Attendance: 200
Referees: Dragan Neskovic (SRB), Aleksandar Milojevic (MKD), Josip Radojkovic (CRO)

12 August 2015
14:30

Boxscore

Germany	77–59	Greece
Scoring by quarter: 17–21, 16–13, 22–5, 22–20
Pts: Wolf 13; Rebs: Serić 6 Asts: Döding, Weidemann 4		Pts: Giannararas, Moraitis 12; Rebs: Domprogiannis 6 Asts: Mellios 6

Kaunas Sports Hall, Kaunas (LTU)
Attendance: 150
Referees: Keith Williams (ENG), Tomas Jasevicius (LTU), Michele Rossi (ITA)

12 August 2015
16:45

Boxscore

Lithuania	64–67	Turkey
Scoring by quarter: 7–19, 22–17, 12–15, 23–16
Pts: Velička 17; Rebs: Vasiliauskas 6 Asts: Velička 5		Pts: Bitim 15; Rebs: Duran 15; Asts: Akyüz 5

Kaunas Sports Hall, Kaunas (LTU)
Attendance: 1000
Referees: Referees: Roberto Chiari (ITA), Aleksandar Milojevic (MKD), Milos Koljensic (MNE)

12 August 2015
19:00

Boxscore

Spain	75–64	England
Scoring by quarter: 19–7, 21–18, 20–21, 15–18
Pts: Martínez 18; Rebs: Martínez, Pompido 8 Asts: 3 players 3		Pts: Bett 18; Rebs: Boachie-Yiadom 8 Asts: Boachie-Yiadom 4

Kaunas Sports Hall, Kaunas (LTU)
Attendance: 150
Referees: Petros Papapetrou (GRE), Miroslav Tomov (BUL), Martins Kozlovskis (LAT)

=== Group F ===
Pos	Team	Pld	W	L	PF	PA	PD	Pts	Qualification
1	Finland	5	4	1	332	331	+1	9	Advance to Quarterfinals
2	Bosnia and Herzegovina	5	3	2	377	331	+46	8	Advance to Quarterfinals
3	Serbia	5	3	2	343	343	0	8	Advance to Quarterfinals
4	France	5	3	2	306	294	+12	8	Advance to Quarterfinals
5	Montenegro	5	2	3	319	332	−13	7	9th – 16th place playoffs
6	Croatia	5	0	5	325	371	−46	5	9th – 16th place playoffs

Source: FIBA Archive

10 August 2015
14:30

Boxscore

Serbia	69–62	France
Scoring by quarter: 21–13, 17–18, 12–20, 19–11
Pts: Marjanović, Pecarski 19; Rebs: Pecarski 12; Asts: Pecarski 5		Pts: Blanc 17; Rebs: Beyhurst 9 Asts: 4 players 2

Kaunas Sports Hall, Kaunas (LTU)
Attendance: 100
Referees: Marius Ciulin (ROU), Marek Cmikiewicz (POL), Petros Papapetrou (GRE)

10 August 2015
16:45

Boxscore

Croatia	75–84	Finland
Scoring by quarter: 12–23, 23–22, 19–14, 21–25
Pts: Vidović 16; Rebs: Mihalić 11; Asts: Jordano, Jularić 3		Pts: Valtonen 23; Rebs: Heinonen 9 Asts: Heinonen 6

Kaunas Sports Hall, Kaunas (LTU)
Attendance: 200
Referees: Francisco Araña (ESP), Yohan Rosso (FRA), Tomas Jasevicius (LTU)

10 August 2015
21:15

Boxscore

Montenegro	77–73	Bosnia and Herzegovina
Scoring by quarter: 15–18, 26–25, 13–24, 23–6
Pts: Slavković 15; Rebs: Simonović 10; Asts: Titić 4		Pts: Musa 22; Rebs: Musa 11; Asts: Musa 6

Kaunas Sports Hall, Kaunas (LTU)
Attendance: 100
Referees: Piotr Pastusiak (POL), Paulo Marques (POR), Amit Balak (ISR)

11 August 2015
14:30

Boxscore

Croatia	71–75	Serbia
Scoring by quarter: 10–24, 17–14, 17–17, 27–20
Pts: Bajo 23; Rebs: Bajo 8 Asts: Jordano 4		Pts: Latinović 19; Rebs: Pecarski 13; Asts: Vulikić 5

Kaunas Sports Hall, Kaunas (LTU)
Attendance: 100
Referees: Roberto Chiari (ITA), Amit Balak (ISR), Michele Rossi (ITA)

11 August 2015
19:00

Boxscore

Bosnia and Herzegovina	64–57	France
Scoring by quarter: 18–9, 17–14, 15–17, 14–17
Pts: Musa 22; Rebs: Sikiraš 8 Asts: Musa 8		Pts: Blanc 16; Rebs: Hoard 11; Asts: Beyhurst 4

Arvydas Sabonis Basketball Centre, Kaunas (LTU)
Attendance: 90
Referees: Marius Ciulin (ROU), Marek Cmikiewicz (POL), Miroslav Tomov (BUL)

11 August 2015
21:15

Boxscore

Finland	58–56	Montenegro
Scoring by quarter: 14–14, 17–12, 12–10, 15–20
Pts: Heinonen 13; Rebs: Jaakkola 9 Asts: Valtonen 6		Pts: Simonović 15; Rebs: Simonović 14; Asts: Drobnjak, Vujović 4

Arvydas Sabonis Basketball Centre, Kaunas (LTU)
Attendance: 70
Referees: Paulo Marques (POR), Tomas Jasevicius (LTU), Yener Yilmaz (TUR)

12 August 2015
19:00

Boxscore

Montenegro	64–78	Serbia
Scoring by quarter: 23–13, 16–22, 18–15, 7–28
Pts: Simonović 19; Rebs: Simonović 10; Asts: 3 players 2		Pts: Marjanović 30; Rebs: Pecarski 10; Asts: Uskoković 6

Arvydas Sabonis Basketball Centre, Kaunas (LTU)
Attendance: 90
Referees: Francisco Araña (ESP), Haydn Jones (WAL), Amit Balak (ISR)

12 August 2015
21:15

Boxscore

France	57–38	Finland
Scoring by quarter: 16–4, 20–11, 5–12, 16–11
Pts: Ruckling 12; Rebs: Bazille 14; Asts: Briki 3		Pts: Valtonen, Pihlajamäki 7 Rebs: Waxlax 6 Asts: 4 players 1

Kaunas Sports Hall, Kaunas (LTU)
Attendance: 100
Referees: Dragan Neskovic (SRB), Josip Radojkovic (CRO), Jonathon Ross Chapman (AUS)

12 August 2015
21:15

Boxscore

Bosnia and Herzegovina	86–59	Croatia
Scoring by quarter: 22–11, 22–17, 24–13, 18–18
Pts: Campara 21; Rebs: Sikiraš 9 Asts: Musa 7		Pts: Bajo 16; Rebs: Bajo 10; Asts: Šarić 3

Arvydas Sabonis Basketball Centre, Kaunas (LTU)
Attendance: 60
Referees: Paulo Marques (POR), Marek Cmikiewicz (POL), Gintaras Vitkauskas (LTU)

== Classification Group G ==
The last team of each group of the First Round will compete in this Classification Round.

Pos	Team	Pld	W	L	PF	PA	PD	Pts
1	Italy	3	3	0	162	122	+40	6
2	Israel	3	2	1	170	152	+18	5
3	Latvia	3	1	2	137	135	+2	4
4	Russia	3	0	3	0	60	−60	0 (Note: Russian Basketball Federation has been suspended from FIBA)

Source: FIBA Archive
Notes:

10 August 2015
14:30 (NOT PLAYED)

Boxscore

Russia	0–20	Latvia

Arvydas Sabonis Basketball Centre, Kaunas (LTU)

10 August 2015
16:45

Boxscore

Israel	73–84	Italy
Scoring by quarter: 23–24, 24–27, 9–18, 17–15
Pts: Suss 18; Rebs: Suss 11; Asts: Zano 5		Pts: Trapani 16; Rebs: Caruso 9 Asts: Trapani 6

Arvydas Sabonis Basketball Centre, Kaunas (LTU)
Attendance: 140
Referees: Keith Williams (ENG), Haydn Jones (WAL), Josip Radojkovic (CRO)

11 August 2015
14:30 (NOT PLAYED)

Boxscore

Italy	20–0	Russia

Arvydas Sabonis Basketball Centre, Kaunas (LTU)

11 August 2015
16:45

Boxscore

Latvia	68–77	Israel
Scoring by quarter: 16–18, 20–18, 15–16, 17–25
Pts: Kaufmanis 16; Rebs: Railans 15; Asts: Kurucs 6		Pts: Ebo 20; Rebs: Porat, Suss 8 Asts: Parker Amitay 5

Arvydas Sabonis Basketball Centre, Kaunas (LTU)
Attendance: 100
Referees: Piotr Pastusiak (POL), Petros Papapetrou (GRE), Ernad Karovic (BIH)

12 August 2015
14:30 (NOT PLAYED)

Boxscore

Russia	0–20	Israel

Arvydas Sabonis Basketball Centre, Kaunas (LTU)

12 August 2015
16:45

Boxscore

Italy	58–49	Latvia
Scoring by quarter: 17–9, 17–9, 15–18, 9–13
Pts: Stefanni 17; Rebs: Caruso 9 Asts: Valentini 4		Pts: Kalnins 14; Rebs: Miska 8 Asts: 4 players 1

Arvydas Sabonis Basketball Centre, Kaunas (LTU)
Attendance: 70
Referees: Marius Ciulin (ROU), Ernad Karovic (BIH), Yener Yilmaz (TUR)

== Classification playoffs for 9th – 16th place ==
13th place match
E6	Greece	77
E5	England	52
15th place match
G4	Russia	0
G2	Israel	20

13th – 16th place playoffs
G4	Russia	0
E6	Greece	20
E5	England	77
G2	Israel	76

9th – 16th place playoffs
F5	Montenegro	20
G4	Russia	0
E6	Greece	45
G1	Italy	62
E5	England	65
G3	Latvia	66
F6	Croatia	84
G2	Israel	82

9th – 12th place playoffs
F5	Montenegro	65
G1	Italy	73
G3	Latvia	70
F6	Croatia	78

9th place match
G1	Italy	68
F6	Croatia	76
11th place match
F5	Montenegro	57
G3	Latvia	60

=== Classification games for 9th – 16th place ===
14 August 2015
21:15 (NOT PLAYED)

Boxscore

Montenegro	20–0	Russia

Arvydas Sabonis Basketball Centre – Kaunas (LTU)

14 August 2015
14:30

Boxscore

Greece	45–62	Italy
Scoring by quarter: 4–14, 5–21, 21–7, 15–20
Scoring by half: 09–35
Pts: Moraitis 14; Rebs: Kampouridis, Vlagkogias 6 Asts: Moraitis 5		Pts: Ebeling 15; Rebs: Ebeling 12; Asts: Pajola, De Zardo 5

Arvydas Sabonis Basketball Centre – Kaunas (LTU)
Attendance: 120
Referees: Francisco Araña (ESP), Tomas Jasevicius (LTU), Jonathon Ross Chapman (AUS)

14 August 2015
16:45

Boxscore

England	65–66	Latvia
Scoring by quarter: 10–14, 25–20, 14–13, 16–19
Scoring by half: 35–34
Pts: Round, Boachie-Yiadom 14; Rebs: Boachie-Yiadom 10; Asts: Bett 7		Pts: Kurucs 20; Rebs: Railans 14; Asts: Kurucs 5

Arvydas Sabonis Basketball Centre – Kaunas (LTU)
Attendance: 100
Referees: Gintaras Vitkauskas (LTU), Ernad Karovic (BIH), Miroslav Tomov (BUL)

14 August 2015
19:00

Boxscore

Croatia	84–82	Israel
Scoring by quarter: 22–28, 29–17, 21–21, 12–16
Scoring by half: 51–35
Pts: Jordano 27; Rebs: Jordano 12; Asts: Jordano 6		Pts: Ebo 27; Rebs: Suss 11; Asts: 3 players 3

Arvydas Sabonis Basketball Centre – Kaunas (LTU)
Attendance: 60
Referees: Keith Williams (ENG), Yohan Rosso (FRA), Martins Kozlovskis (LAT)

=== Classification games for 13th – 16th place ===
15 August 2015
21:15 (NOT PLAYED)

Russia	0–20	Greece

Arvydas Sabonis Basketball Centre – Kaunas (LTU)

15 August 2015
14:30

Boxscore

England	77–76	Israel
Scoring by quarter: 15–29, 23–20, 14–11, 25–16
Pts: Boachie-Yiadom 27; Rebs: Boachie-Yiadom 16; Asts: Bett 4		Pts: Ebo 32; Rebs: Suss 13; Asts: Kravits 5

Arvydas Sabonis Basketball Centre – Kaunas (LTU)
Attendance: 110
Referees: Piotr Pastusiak (POL), Tomas Jasevicius (LTU), Ernad Karovic (BIH)

=== Classification games for 9th – 12th place ===
15 August 2015
16:45

Boxscore

Montenegro	65–73	Italy
Scoring by quarter: 15–21, 15–15, 12–18, 23–19
Pts: Drobnjak 26; Rebs: Vujović 7 Asts: Drobnjak 3		Pts: Ebeling 18; Rebs: De Zardo 7 Asts: Laganà 5

Arvydas Sabonis Basketball Centre – Kaunas (LTU)
Attendance: 100
Referees: Paulo Marques (POR), Yener Yilmaz (TUR), Martins Kozlovskis (LAT)

15 August 2015
19:00

Boxscore

Latvia	70–78	Croatia
Scoring by quarter: 17–23, 8–12, 28–18, 17–25
Pts: Kurucs 32; Rebs: Miska 7 Asts: Kalnins 4		Pts: Jularić 16; Rebs: Vrgoč 8 Asts: Vidović 5

Arvydas Sabonis Basketball Centre – Kaunas (LTU)
Attendance: 60
Referees: Petros Papapetrou (GRE), Miroslav Tomov (BUL), Jonathon Ross Chapman (AUS)

== Championship playoffs ==
Fifth place
F4	France	75
F1	Finland	46
Seventh place
E3	Germany	91
F3	Serbia	64

Consolation semifinals
F4	France	57
E3	Germany	55
F1	Finland	68
F3	Serbia	63

Quarterfinals
E1	Spain	72
F4	France	63
F2	Bosnia and Herzegovina	70
E3	Germany	54
F1	Finland	74
E4	Lithuania	93
E2	Turkey	87
F3	Serbia	66

Semifinals
E1	Spain	78
F2	Bosnia and Herzegovina	86 (2OT)
E4	Lithuania	73
E2	Turkey	71

Final
F2	Bosnia and Herzegovina	85
E4	Lithuania	83
Third place
E1	Spain	72
E2	Turkey	83

=== Quarterfinals ===
14 August 2015
14:30

Boxscore

Spain	72–63	France
Scoring by quarter: 15–8, 16–13, 21–19, 20–23
Pts: González 25; Rebs: Salvador 8 Asts: Sagrista 6		Pts: Fevrier 20; Rebs: Fevrier 12; Asts: Beyhurst 4

Kaunas Sports Hall, Kaunas (LTU)
Attendance: 300
Referees: Dragan Neskovic (SRB), Aleksandar Milojevic (MKD), Amit Balak (ISR)

14 August 2015
16:45

Boxscore

Bosnia and Herzegovina	70–54	Germany
Scoring by quarter: 14–6, 25–11, 12–13, 19–24
Pts: Musa 25; Rebs: Musa 13; Asts: Musa 9		Pts: Weidemann 13; Rebs: Wendler 10; Asts: 3 players 2

Kaunas Sports Hall, Kaunas (LTU)
Attendance: 400
Referees: Roberto Chiari (ITA), Paulo Marques (POR), Marek Cmikiewicz (POL)

14 August 2015
19:00

Boxscore

Finland	74–93	Lithuania
Scoring by quarter: 23–21, 15–22, 21–25, 15–25
Pts: Valtonen 21; Rebs: Valtonen 6 Asts: Heinonen 6		Pts: Velička, Kozys 18; Rebs: Balčiūnas 11; Asts: Bakutis 5

Kaunas Sports Hall, Kaunas (LTU)
Attendance: 3,000
Referees: Piotr Pastusiak (POL), Milos Koljensic (MNE), Josip Radojkovic (CRO)

14 August 2015
21:15

Boxscore

Turkey	87–66	Serbia
Scoring by quarter: 24–16, 20–17, 20–18, 23–15
Pts: Bitim 27; Rebs: Duran 17; Asts: Sipahi, Akyuz 3		Pts: Uskoković 21; Rebs: Pecarski 5 Asts: Uskoković 5

Kaunas Sports Hall, Kaunas (LTU)
Attendance: 150
Referees: Marius Ciulin (ROU), Haydn Jones (WAL), Petros Papapetrou (GRE)

=== Classification games for 5th to 8th place ===
15 August 2015
14:30

Boxscore

France	57–55	Germany
Scoring by quarter: 11–14, 15–15, 13–17, 15–9
Pts: Fevrier 17; Rebs: Bazille 11; Asts: Rucklin 3		Pts: Herkenhoff 17; Rebs: Herkenhoff 15; Asts: Drescher 3

Kaunas Sports Hall, Kaunas (LTU)
Attendance: 100
Referees: Keith Williams (ENG), Aleksandar Milojevic (MKD), Milos Koljensic (MNE)

15 August 2015
16:45

Boxscore

Finland	68–63	Serbia
Scoring by quarter: 11–19, 23–13, 17–8, 17–23
Pts: Valtonen 25; Rebs: Antikainen, Heinonen 7 Asts: Heinonen 6		Pts: Marjanović 13; Rebs: 3 players 9 Asts: Uskoković 4

Kaunas Sports Hall, Kaunas (LTU)
Attendance: 400
Referees: Francisco Araña (ESP), Gintaras Vitkauskas (LTU), Michele Rossi (ITA)

=== Semifinals ===
15 August 2015
19:00

Boxscore

Lithuania	73–71	Turkey
Scoring by quarter: 12–20, 22–18, 20–23, 19–10
Scoring by half: 34–38
Pts: Kozys 12; Rebs: Vasiliauskas 9 Asts: Velička 4		Pts: Bitim 18; Rebs: Duran 13; Asts: Duran 4

Kaunas Sports Hall, Kaunas (LTU)
Attendance: 3,500
Referees: Dragan Neškovic (SRB), Marek Cmikiewicz (POL), Yohan Rosso (FRA)

15 August 2015
21:15

Boxscore

Spain	78–86 (OT)	Bosnia and Herzegovina
Scoring by quarter: 12–19, 20–12, 15–16, 16–16, Overtime: 10–10, 5–13
Scoring by half: 32–31 Overtime: 10–10, 5–13
Pts: Martínez 27; Rebs: Martínez 20; Asts: González 4		Pts: Campara, Musa 24; Rebs: Barukcija 10; Asts: Campara 6

Kaunas Sports Hall, Kaunas (LTU)
Attendance: 200
Referees: Marius Ciulin (ROU), Haydn Jones (WAL), Amit Balak (ISR)

== Final classification games ==
=== Match for 15th place ===
16 August 2015
21:15 (NOT PLAYED)

Israel	20–0	Russia

Arvydas Sabonis Basketball Centre – Kaunas (LTU)

=== Match for 13th place ===
16 August 2015
14:30

Boxscore

Greece	77–52	England
Scoring by quarter: 15–14, 21–15, 15–2, 26–21
Pts: Kampouridis 17; Rebs: Kampouridis 8 Asts: Giannaras 11		Pts: Cleary 19; Rebs: Iwowo 10; Asts: Iwowo 3

Arvydas Sabonis Basketball Centre – Kaunas (LTU)
Attendance: 70
Referees: Marius Ciulin (ROU), Marek Cmikiewicz (POL), Yohan Rosso (FRA)

=== Match for 11th place ===
16 August 2015
16:45

Boxscore

Montenegro	57–60	Latvia
Scoring by quarter: 18–13, 17–13, 13–25, 9–9
Pts: Slavković 21; Rebs: Simonović 10; Asts: Slavković 6		Pts: Kurucs 20; Rebs: Berkis 8 Asts: 3 players 4

Arvydas Sabonis Basketball Centre – Kaunas (LTU)
Attendance: 60
Referees: Haydn Jones (WAL), Keith Williams (ENG), Jonathon Ross Chapman (AUS)

=== Match for 9th place ===
16 August 2015
19:00

Boxscore

Italy	68–76	Croatia
Scoring by quarter: 22–18, 11–17, 24–24, 11–17
Pts: Stefanini 15; Rebs: Caruso 8 Asts: Valentini, Stefanini 4		Pts: Jularić 20; Rebs: Bajo 10; Asts: Jordano 9

Arvydas Sabonis Basketball Centre – Kaunas (LTU)
Attendance: 60
Referees: Tomas Jasevicius (LTU), Yener Yilmaz (TUR), Miroslav Tomov (BUL)

=== Match for 7th place ===
16 August 2015
14:30

Boxscore

Germany	91–64	Serbia
Scoring by quarter: 17–19, 27–21, 28–7, 19–17
Pts: Weidemann 25; Rebs: Bonga 10; Asts: Bonga 6		Pts: Kovačević 13; Rebs: Pecarski 4 Asts: Uskoković 7

Kaunas Sports Hall – Kaunas (LTU)
Attendance: 100
Referees: Francisco Araña (ESP), Gintaras Vitkauskas (LTU), Michele Rossi (ITA)

=== Match for 5th place ===
16 August 2015
16:45

Boxscore

France	75–46	Finland
Scoring by quarter: 23–8, 16–14, 16–9, 20–15
Pts: Blanc 23; Rebs: Beyhurst 9 Asts: Blanc, Briki 4		Pts: Valtonen 17; Rebs: Antikainen 6 Asts: 3 players 2

Kaunas Sports Hall – Kaunas (LTU)
Attendance: 150
Referees: Dragan Neskovic (SRB), Ernad Karovic (BIH), Martins Kozlovskis (LAT)

=== Bronze medal match ===
16 August 2015
19:00

Boxscore

Spain	72–83	Turkey
Scoring by quarter: 13–19, 15–16, 23–27, 21–21
Pts: Martínez 24; Rebs: Martínez 14; Asts: McCarthy 5		Pts: Bitim 16; Rebs: Afsar 9 Asts: Akyuz 5

Kaunas Sports Hall – Kaunas (LTU)
Attendance: 3,800
Referees: Aleksandar Milojevic (MKD), Paulo Marques (POR), Josip Radojkovic (CRO)

=== Final ===
16 August 2015
21:15

Boxscore

Bosnia and Herzegovina	85–83	Lithuania
Scoring by quarter: 26–19, 24–18, 19–22, 16–24
Pts: Musa 33; Rebs: Mutić, Musa 8 Asts: Musa 7		Pts: Velička 14; Rebs: Juozaitis 7 Asts: 4 players 3

Kaunas Sports Hall – Kaunas (LTU)
Attendance: 4,500
Referees: Roberto Chiari (ITA), Piotr Pastusiak (POL), Miloš Koljenšić (MNE)

== Final standings ==
Rank	Team	Record
1st place, gold medalist(s)	Bosnia and Herzegovina	7–2
2nd place, silver medalist(s)	Lithuania	6–3
3rd place, bronze medalist(s)	Turkey	7–2
4th	Spain	6–3
5th	France	6–3
6th	Finland	5–4
7th	Germany	5–4
8th	Serbia	4–5
9th	Croatia	4–5
10th	Italy	6–3
11th	Latvia	3–6
12th	Montenegro	4–5
13th	Greece	3–6
14th	England	3–6
15th	Israel	3–6
16th	Russia	0–9

2015 FIBA Europe Under-16 Championship
Winners

Bosnia and Herzegovina
First title

Qualified for the 2016 FIBA Under-17 World Championship
Qualified as the host nation for the 2016 FIBA Under-17 World Championship
Relegated to the 2016 FIBA U16 European Championship Division B

== Awards ==
Most Valuable Player
(Bosnia and Herzegovina) Džanan Musa

All-Tournament Team

- (Lithuania) Arnas Velička
- (Turkey) Onuralp Bitim
- (Bosnia and Herzegovina) Džanan Musa
- (Bosnia and Herzegovina) Njegoš Sikiraš
- (Turkey) Ahmet Duran
