= Elias Valtonen =

Finnish basketball player (born 1999)

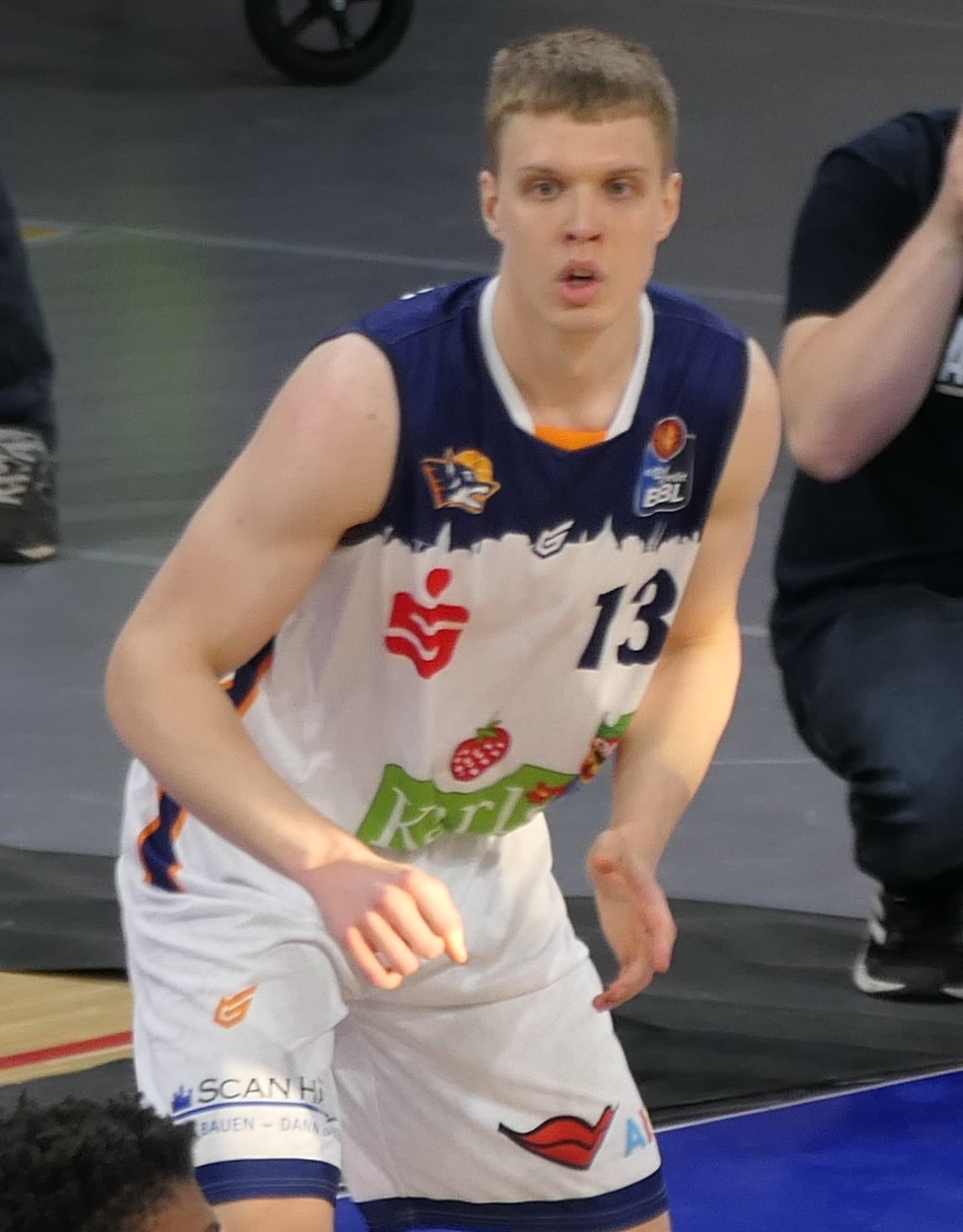
- Valtonen with Rostock in 2023

Free agent
- Position: Shooting guard / small forward

Personal information
- Born: June 11, 1999 (age 27) Eura, Finland
- Listed height: 2.01 m (6 ft 7 in)
- Listed weight: 88.5 kg (195 lb)

Career information
- High school: Helsinki Basketball Academy (Helsinki, Finland)
- College: Arizona State (2018–2020)
- NBA draft: 2021: undrafted
- Playing career: 2013–present

Career history
- 2013–2015: Korihait
- 2015–2018: HBA-Märsky
- 2020–2021: Tigers Tübingen
- 2021–2024: Baxi Manresa
- 2022–2023: →Rostock Seawolves
- 2024–2026: Granada

Elias Veikko Juhani Valtonen (born June 11, 1999) is a Finnish professional basketball player who last played for Covirán Granada of the Liga ACB. He played college basketball for the Arizona State Sun Devils. Valtonen is 2.01 m (6 ft 7 in) tall, and plays the shooting guard position.

== Early life and career ==
Valtonen started playing basketball in a youth team of his hometown club Euran Veivi. He made his debut for Korihait in Finnish top league Korisliiga in February 2014, at the age of 14. He played five games in total during his rookie season, while the team finished last and was relegated. In the summer of 2015, Valtonen moved to Helsinki to play in the highly regarded academy team HBA-Märsky, coached by former NBA player Hanno Möttölä.

Valtonen was invited to the Jordan Brand Classic Camp in 2015. He has been recruited by several American colleges, including Illinois, Arizona State, Arizona and Utah. On October 13, 2017, Valtonen announced that he'd commit to Arizona State after his current season in Finland was finished with.

== College career ==
Valtonen played collegiately at Arizona State for two seasons. He scored a career-high 10 points in a win over St. John's on November 23, 2019. He averaged 2.0 points per game as a sophomore. On March 17, 2020, Valtonen announced he was leaving Arizona State.

== Professional career ==
On June 19, 2020, Valtonen signed with Tigers Tübingen of the ProA.

On May 28, 2021, he signed with Baxi Manresa of the Liga ACB and the Basketball Champions League. On 5 December 2022, it was announced that Valtonen was loaned out to German Basketball Bundesliga team Rostock Seawolves for the rest of the ongoing 2022–23 season. He returned to Manresa in the summer 2023.

On 28 February 2024, Valtonen joined fellow Liga ACB team Granada for the remainder of the season. At the end of the season, he helped the club to secure their spot in Liga ACB by his game-saving block, and in June 2024, he signed a two-year contract extension with Granada.

== National team ==
Valtonen was part of the Finland U16 squad in the 2015 FIBA U16 EuroBasket in Kaunas, Lithuania, and in Finland U17 squad in the 2016 FIBA U17 World Cup in Zaragoza, Spain.

Valtonen is a member of the Finland senior national team and represented his country in the EuroBasket 2022 and in the 2023 FIBA World Cup. He also played in the 2024 FIBA Olympic qualifying tournament.

He played for Finland at the EuroBasket 2025 and helped them to reach the semi-finals for the first time in the country's history, with his multiple clutch shots. He was also named the Player of the Game in the round of 16 win against Serbia, after scoring eight of his 13 points in the final two minutes.

== Career statistics ==
Legend
| GP | Games played | GS | Games started | MPG | Minutes per game |
| FG% | Field goal percentage | 3P% | 3-point field goal percentage | FT% | Free throw percentage |
| RPG | Rebounds per game | APG | Assists per game | SPG | Steals per game |
| BPG | Blocks per game | PPG | Points per game | **Bold** | Career high |

=== FIBA Champions League ===
| Year | Team | GP | GS | MPG | FG% | 3P% | FT% | RPG | APG | SPG | BPG | PPG |
|---|---|---|---|---|---|---|---|---|---|---|---|---|
| 2021–22 | Manresa | **14** | | **21.7** | .385 | .194 | .500 | **3.4** | **1.1** | **.8** | **.6** | 4.6 |
| 2022–23 | Manresa | 3 | | 16.0 | **.429** | **.444** | **.600** | 2.0 | .0 | .3 | .3 | **6.3** |

=== Domestic leagues ===
| Year | Team | League | GP | MPG | FG% | 3P% | FT% | RPG | APG | SPG | BPG | PPG |
|---|---|---|---|---|---|---|---|---|---|---|---|---|
| 2013–14 | (Finland) Korihait | Korisliiga | 5 | 2.2 | .500 | .0 | – | – | .4 | — | — | 0.4 |
| 2014–15 | (Finland) Korihait | I-divisioona | 27 | 13.3 | .392 | .304 | .583 | 1.8 | .5 | .3 | .1 | 3.6 |
| 2015–16 | (Finland) HBA-Märsky | I-divisioona | 25 | 24.0 | .513 | .375 | .730 | 3.5 | 1.2 | 1.4 | .6 | 7.9 |
| 2016–17 | (Finland) HBA-Märsky | I-divisioona | 15 | 26.7 | .388 | .250 | .750 | 5.7 | 2.4 | 1.3 | .8 | 9.0 |
| 2017–18 | (Finland) HBA-Märsky | I-divisioona | 20 | 24.6 | .506 | .417 | .762 | 4.8 | 3.0 | 1.7 | .8 | 15.7 |
| 2020–21 | (Germany) Tübingen | ProA | 23 | 30.0 | .539 | .370 | .802 | 4.8 | 2.5 | 1.1 | 1.0 | 15.8 |
| 2021-22 | (Spain) Manresa | ACB | 32 | 22.0 | .450 | .359 | .771 | 2.5 | .7 | .8 | .3 | 7.2 |
| 2022–23 | (Spain) Manresa | ACB | 5 | 12.0 | .100 | .000 | .750 | 1.2 | .2 | .2 | .0 | 1.0 |
| 2022–23 | (Germany) Rostock | BBL | 21 | 19.0 | .409 | .200 | .839 | 3.2 | .7 | .7 | .3 | 6.0 |
| 2023–24 | (Spain) Manresa | ACB | 18 | 14.2 | .438 | .257 | .643 | 2.6 | .3 | .2 | .4 | 4.6 |
| 2023–24 | (Spain) Granada | ACB | 12 | 22.0 | .455 | .386 | .889 | 3.7 | .4 | .3 | .1 | 8.6 |
| 2024–25 | (Spain) Granada | ACB | 32 | 24.3 | .487 | .415 | .724 | 3.6 | 1.2 | .7 | .4 | 9.3 |

=== College ===
| Year | Team | GP | GS | MPG | FG% | 3P% | FT% | RPG | APG | SPG | BPG | PPG |
|---|---|---|---|---|---|---|---|---|---|---|---|---|
| 2018–19 | Arizona State | **21** | 0 | 3.7 | **.556** | **.500** | **1.000** | .4 | .1 | .1 | **.2** | .8 |
| 2019–20 | Arizona State | 19 | **8** | **14.3** | .375 | **.500** | .467 | **1.8** | **.4** | **.5** | .1 | **2.0** |
| Career | | 40 | 8 | 8.7 | .415 | .500 | .529 | 1.1 | .2 | .3 | .2 | 1.4 |

=== National team ===
| Team | Tournament | Pos. | GP | PPG | RPG | APG |
|---|---|---|---|---|---|---|
| Finland | EuroBasket 2022 | 7th | 7 | 6.7 | 3.1 | 1.1 |
| Finland | 2023 FIBA World Cup | 21st | 5 | 7.0 | 2.4 | 1.4 |
| Finland | EuroBasket 2025 | 4th | 9 | 7.7 | 3.2 | 1.6 |
