= Montenegro men's national under-16 and under-17 basketball team =

Montenegro youth national basketball team

Montenegro
- FIBA zone: FIBA Europe
- National federation: Košarkaški Savez Crne Gore

U17 World Cup
- Appearances: 1
- Medals: None

U16 EuroBasket
- Appearances: 10
- Medals: Silver: 1 (2017)

U16 EuroBasket Division B
- Appearances: 8
- Medals: Gold: 1 (2014); Silver: 2 (2008, 2012)
Light	Dark

The Montenegro men's national under-16 and under-17 basketball team is a national basketball team of Montenegro, administered by the Basketball Federation of Montenegro. It represents the country in international under-16 and under-17 men's basketball competitions.

== FIBA U16 EuroBasket participations ==
Year	Division A	Division B
2007		6th
2008		2nd place, silver medalist(s)
2009	10th	
2010	8th	
2011	16th	
2012		2nd place, silver medalist(s)
2013	15th	
2014		1st place, gold medalist(s)
2015	12th	

Year	Division A	Division B
2016	8th	
2017	2nd place, silver medalist(s)	
2018	14th	
2019		4th
2022	9th	
2023	14th	
2024		5th
2025		5th
2026		6th

== FIBA Under-17 Basketball World Cup participations ==
Year	Result
2018	8th

== See also ==
- Montenegro men's national basketball team
- Montenegro men's national under-18 basketball team
- Montenegro women's national under-16 basketball team
