= 2014 FIBA Europe Under-16 Championship Division B =

Tournament details
- Host country: Macedonia
- City: Strumica
- Dates: 20–30 August 2014
- Teams: 22 (from 1 confederation)
- Venues: 2 (in 1 host city)

Final positions
- Champions: Montenegro (1st title)
- Runners-up: Israel
- Third place: England

Official website
- FIBA Archive

The 2014 FIBA U16 European Championship Division B was the 11th edition of the Division B of the European basketball championship for men's national under-16 teams. It was played from 20 to 30 August 2014 in Strumica, Republic of Macedonia. Montenegro men's national under-16 basketball team won the tournament.

== Participating teams ==
- Albania
- Austria
- Belgium ▼ (14th place, 2013 FIBA Europe Under-16 Championship Division A)
- Bulgaria
- Czech Republic
- England
- Estonia
- Georgia
- Hungary
- Ireland
- Israel
- Luxembourg
- Macedonia
- Montenegro ▼ (15th place, 2013 FIBA Europe Under-16 Championship Division A)
- Netherlands
- Norway
- Portugal
- Romania
- Scotland
- Slovenia
- Sweden ▼ (16th place, 2013 FIBA Europe Under-16 Championship Division A)
- Switzerland

== First round ==
In the first round, the teams were drawn into four groups. The first two teams from each group advance to the quarterfinal groups; the third and fourth teams advance to the 9th–16th place classification; the other teams will play in the 17th–22nd place classification groups.

=== Group A ===
Pos	Team	Pld	W	L	PF	PA	PD	Pts	Qualification
1	Belgium	5	5	0	337	215	+122	10	Quarterfinal groups
2	England	5	4	1	376	261	+115	9	Quarterfinal groups
3	Romania	5	3	2	304	319	−15	8	9th–16th place classification
4	Estonia	5	2	3	320	307	+13	7	9th–16th place classification
5	Scotland	5	1	4	290	391	−101	6	17th–22nd place classification
6	Luxembourg	5	0	5	246	380	−134	5	17th–22nd place classification

Source: FIBA Archive

20 August 2014

Boxscore

Scotland	51–94	England

Strumica

20 August 2014

Boxscore

Romania	74–62	Luxembourg

Strumica

20 August 2014

Boxscore

Belgium	60–43	Estonia

Strumica

21 August 2014

Boxscore

Luxembourg	33–71	Belgium

Strumica

21 August 2014

Boxscore

England	68–47	Romania

Strumica

21 August 2014

Boxscore

Estonia	67–48	Scotland

Strumica

22 August 2014

Boxscore

Belgium	64–42	Romania

Strumica

22 August 2014

Boxscore

Scotland	78–67	Luxembourg

Strumica

22 August 2014

Boxscore

Estonia	75–83	England

Strumica

23 August 2014

Boxscore

Luxembourg	52–78	Estonia

Strumica

23 August 2014

Boxscore

Romania	77–68	Scotland

Strumica

23 August 2014

Boxscore

England	52–56	Belgium

Strumica

24 August 2014

Boxscore

Scotland	45–86	Belgium

Strumica

24 August 2014

Boxscore

Luxembourg	32–79	England

Strumica

24 August 2014

Boxscore

Estonia	57–64	Romania

Strumica

=== Group B ===
Pos	Team	Pld	W	L	PF	PA	PD	Pts	Qualification
1	Israel	4	4	0	340	232	+108	8	Quarterfinal groups
2	Slovenia	4	2	2	306	264	+42	6	Quarterfinal groups
3	Georgia	4	2	2	334	286	+48	6	9th–16th place classification
4	Macedonia	4	2	2	297	305	−8	6	9th–16th place classification
5	Norway	4	0	4	157	347	−190	4	17th–22nd place classification

Source: FIBA Archive

20 August 2014

Boxscore

Norway	40–77	Macedonia

Strumica

20 August 2014

Boxscore

Georgia	73–81	Slovenia

Strumica

21 August 2014

Boxscore

Israel	86–63	Georgia

Strumica

21 August 2014

Boxscore

Slovenia	77–39	Norway

Strumica

22 August 2014

Boxscore

Macedonia	80–78	Slovenia

Strumica

22 August 2014

Boxscore

Norway	36–82	Israel

Strumica

23 August 2014

Boxscore

Georgia	111–42	Norway

Strumica

23 August 2014

Boxscore

Israel	100–63	Macedonia

Strumica

24 August 2014

Boxscore

Slovenia	70–72	Israel

Strumica

24 August 2014

Boxscore

Macedonia	77–87	Georgia

Strumica

=== Group C ===
Pos	Team	Pld	W	L	PF	PA	PD	Pts	Qualification
1	Czech Republic	4	4	0	248	212	+36	8	Quarterfinal groups
2	Hungary	4	3	1	263	236	+27	7	Quarterfinal groups
3	Bulgaria	4	2	2	256	250	+6	6	9th–16th place classification
4	Netherlands	4	1	3	250	237	+13	5	9th–16th place classification
5	Ireland	4	0	4	185	267	−82	4	17th–22nd place classification

Source: FIBA Archive

20 August 2014

Boxscore

Ireland	42–74	Netherlands

Strumica

20 August 2014

Boxscore

Bulgaria	54–64	Czech Republic

Strumica

21 August 2014

Boxscore

Hungary	73–59	Bulgaria

Strumica

21 August 2014

Boxscore

Czech Republic	76–52	Ireland

Strumica

22 August 2014

Boxscore

Netherlands	42–43	Czech Republic

Strumica

22 August 2014

Boxscore

Ireland	42–55	Hungary

Strumica

23 August 2014

Boxscore

Bulgaria	62–49	Ireland

Strumica

23 August 2014

Boxscore

Hungary	71–70	Netherlands

Strumica

24 August 2014

Boxscore

Netherlands	64–81	Bulgaria

Strumica

24 August 2014

Boxscore

Czech Republic	65–64	Hungary

Strumica

=== Group D ===
Pos	Team	Pld	W	L	PF	PA	PD	Pts	Qualification
1	Montenegro	5	5	0	404	264	+140	10	Quarterfinal groups
2	Austria	5	3	2	299	256	+43	8	Quarterfinal groups
3	Switzerland	5	3	2	266	308	−42	8	9th–16th place classification
4	Sweden	5	2	3	242	270	−28	7	9th–16th place classification
5	Albania	5	1	4	255	310	−55	6	17th–22nd place classification
6	Portugal	5	1	4	222	280	−58	6	17th–22nd place classification

Source: FIBA Archive

20 August 2014

Boxscore

Albania	45–47	Sweden

Strumica

20 August 2014

Boxscore

Portugal	52–49	Austria

Strumica

20 August 2014

Boxscore

Montenegro	93–44	Switzerland

Strumica

21 August 2014

Boxscore

Sweden	51–46	Portugal

Strumica

21 August 2014

Boxscore

Switzerland	72–61	Albania

Strumica

21 August 2014

Boxscore

Austria	61–80	Montenegro

Strumica

22 August 2014

Boxscore

Albania	45–67	Austria

Strumica

22 August 2014

Boxscore

Switzerland	53–47	Sweden

Strumica

22 August 2014

Boxscore

Montenegro	73–47	Portugal

Strumica

23 August 2014

Boxscore

Austria	67–44	Switzerland

Strumica

23 August 2014

Boxscore

Portugal	37–54	Albania

Strumica

23 August 2014

Boxscore

Sweden	62–71	Montenegro

Strumica

24 August 2014

Boxscore

Austria	55–35	Sweden

Strumica

24 August 2014

Boxscore

Switzerland	53–40	Portugal

Strumica

24 August 2014

Boxscore

Albania	50–87	Montenegro

Strumica

== 17th–22nd place classification ==
=== Group I ===
Pos	Team	Pld	W	L	PF	PA	PD	Pts	Qualification
1	Scotland	2	2	0	145	132	+13	4	17th place match
2	Norway	2	1	1	130	111	+19	3	19th place match
3	Luxembourg	2	0	2	111	143	−32	2	21st place match

Source: FIBA Archive

26 August 2014

Boxscore

Luxembourg	44–65	Norway

Strumica

27 August 2014

Boxscore

Norway	65–67	Scotland

Strumica

=== Group J ===
Pos	Team	Pld	W	L	PF	PA	PD	Pts	Qualification
1	Albania	2	2	0	129	101	+28	4	17th place match
2	Portugal	2	1	1	121	112	+9	3	19th place match
3	Ireland	2	0	2	122	159	−37	2	21st place match

Source: FIBA Archive

26 August 2014

Boxscore

Portugal	84–58	Ireland

Strumica

27 August 2014

Boxscore

Ireland	64–75	Albania

Strumica

=== 17th–22nd place playoffs ===
==== 21st place match ====
29 August 2014

Boxscore

Luxembourg	56–57	Ireland

Strumica

==== 19th place match ====
29 August 2014

Boxscore

Norway	57–50	Portugal

Strumica

==== 17th place match ====
30 August 2014

Boxscore

Scotland	60–67	Albania

Strumica

== 9th–16th place classification ==
=== Group G ===
Pos	Team	Pld	W	L	PF	PA	PD	Pts	Qualification
1	Georgia	3	3	0	276	200	+76	6	9th–12th place playoffs
2	Macedonia	3	2	1	234	210	+24	5	9th–12th place playoffs
3	Romania	3	1	2	195	236	−41	4	13th–16th place playoffs
4	Estonia	3	0	3	172	231	−59	3	13th–16th place playoffs

Source: FIBA Archive

26 August 2014

Boxscore

Estonia	60–92	Georgia

Strumica

26 August 2014

Boxscore

Romania	68–82	Macedonia

Strumica

27 August 2014

Boxscore

Georgia	97–63	Romania

Strumica

27 August 2014

Boxscore

Macedonia	75–55	Estonia

Strumica

=== Group H ===
Pos	Team	Pld	W	L	PF	PA	PD	Pts	Qualification
1	Bulgaria	3	2	1	221	199	+22	5	9th–12th place playoffs
2	Netherlands	3	2	1	190	180	+10	5	9th–12th place playoffs
3	Switzerland	3	1	2	181	184	−3	4	13th–16th place playoffs
4	Sweden	3	1	2	153	182	−29	4	13th–16th place playoffs

Source: FIBA Archive

26 August 2014

Boxscore

Bulgaria	66–67	Sweden

Strumica

26 August 2014

Boxscore

Netherlands	63–60	Switzerland

Strumica

27 August 2014

Boxscore

Switzerland	68–74	Bulgaria

Strumica

27 August 2014

Boxscore

Sweden	39–63	Netherlands

Strumica

=== 13th–16th place playoffs ===
13th–16th place semifinals
G3	Romania	54
H4	Sweden	57
H3	Switzerland	56
G4	Estonia	75

13th place match
H4	Sweden	63
G4	Estonia	51
15th place match
G3	Romania	77
H3	Switzerland	49

==== 13th–16th place semifinals ====
29 August 2014

Boxscore

Romania	54–57	Sweden

Strumica

29 August 2014

Boxscore

Switzerland	56–75	Estonia

Strumica

==== 15th place match ====
30 August 2014

Boxscore

Romania	77–49	Switzerland

Strumica

==== 13th place match ====
30 August 2014

Boxscore

Sweden	63–51	Estonia

Strumica

=== 9th–12th place playoffs ===
9th–12th place semifinals
G1	Georgia	92
H2	Netherlands	37
H1	Bulgaria	68
G2	Macedonia	80

9th place match
G1	Georgia	81
G2	Macedonia	93
11th place match
H2	Netherlands	63
H1	Bulgaria	50

==== 9th–12th place semifinals ====
29 August 2014

Boxscore

Georgia	92–37	Netherlands

Strumica

29 August 2014

Boxscore

Bulgaria	68–80	Macedonia

Strumica

==== 11th place match ====
30 August 2014

Boxscore

Netherlands	63–50	Bulgaria

Strumica

==== 9th place match ====
30 August 2014

Boxscore

Georgia	81–93	Macedonia

Strumica

== 1st–8th place classification ==
=== Group E ===
Pos	Team	Pld	W	L	PF	PA	PD	Pts	Qualification
1	Israel	3	3	0	227	205	+22	6	Semifinals
2	England	3	1	2	201	208	−7	4	Semifinals
3	Slovenia	3	1	2	205	206	−1	4	5th–8th place playoffs
4	Belgium	3	1	2	176	190	−14	4	5th–8th place playoffs

Source: FIBA Archive

26 August 2014

Boxscore

Belgium	61–70	Slovenia

Strumica

26 August 2014

Boxscore

England	76–87	Israel

Strumica

27 August 2014

Boxscore

Israel	68–59	Belgium

Strumica

27 August 2014

Boxscore

Slovenia	65–73	England

Strumica

=== Group F ===
Pos	Team	Pld	W	L	PF	PA	PD	Pts	Qualification
1	Montenegro	3	3	0	236	169	+67	6	Semifinals
2	Czech Republic	3	2	1	176	173	+3	5	Semifinals
3	Hungary	3	1	2	182	200	−18	4	5th–8th place playoffs
4	Austria	3	0	3	149	201	−52	3	5th–8th place playoffs

Source: FIBA Archive

26 August 2014

Boxscore

Czech Republic	62–39	Austria

Strumica

26 August 2014

Boxscore

Hungary	59–86	Montenegro

Strumica

27 August 2014

Boxscore

Austria	49–59	Hungary

Strumica

27 August 2014

Boxscore

Montenegro	70–49	Czech Republic

Strumica

=== 5th–8th place playoffs ===
5th–8th place semifinals
E3	Slovenia	77
F4	Austria	65
F3	Hungary	56
E4	Belgium	60

5th place match
E3	Slovenia	47
E4	Belgium	67
7th place match
F4	Austria	51
F3	Hungary	78

==== 5th–8th place semifinals ====
29 August 2014

Boxscore

Slovenia	77–65	Austria

Strumica

29 August 2014

Boxscore

Hungary	56–60	Belgium

Strumica

==== 7th place match ====
30 August 2014

Boxscore

Austria	51–78	Hungary

Strumica

==== 5th place match ====
30 August 2014

Boxscore

Slovenia	47–67	Belgium

Strumica

=== Championship playoffs ===
Semifinals
E1	Israel	76
F2	Czech Republic	63
F1	Montenegro	82
E2	England	62

Final
E1	Israel	73
F1	Montenegro	76
3rd place match
F2	Czech Republic	60
E2	England	84

==== Semifinals ====
29 August 2014

Boxscore

Israel	76–63	Czech Republic

Strumica

29 August 2014

Boxscore

Montenegro	82–62	England

Strumica

==== 3rd place match ====
30 August 2014

Boxscore

Czech Republic	60–84	England

Strumica

==== Final ====
30 August 2014

Boxscore

Israel	73–76	Montenegro

Strumica

== Final standings ==
Rank	Team
1st place, gold medalist(s)	Montenegro
2nd place, silver medalist(s)	Israel
3rd place, bronze medalist(s)	England
4	Czech Republic
5	Belgium
6	Slovenia
7	Hungary
8	Austria
9	Macedonia
10	Georgia
11	Netherlands
12	Bulgaria
13	Sweden
14	Estonia
15	Romania
16	Switzerland
17	Albania
18	Scotland
19	Norway
20	Portugal
21	Ireland
22	Luxembourg

Promoted to the 2015 FIBA Europe Under-16 Championship Division A

== See also ==
- 2014 FIBA Europe Under-16 Championship (Division A)
