= Njegoš Sikiraš =

Bosnian basketball player (born 1999)

BC Timișoara
- Position: Power forward
- League: Liga Națională

Personal information
- Born: April 11, 1999 (age 27) Pale, Bosnia and Herzegovina
- Listed height: 2.06 m (6 ft 9 in)
- Listed weight: 95 kg (209 lb)

Career information
- Playing career: 2017–present

Career history
- 2015–2017: Stella Azzurra Roma
- 2017–2021: Fuenlabrada
- 2017: →Viten Getafe
- 2017–2018: →Óbila
- 2018–2019: →Quesería La Antigua Tormes
- 2020: →Marín Peixegalego
- 2021: →Melilla
- 2021–2022: Borac Banja Luka
- 2022: CB Peñas Huesca
- 2022–2023: Budućnost Bijeljina
- 2023–2024: Rogaška
- 2024: Rabotnički
- 2024–2025: Okapi Aalstar
- 2025–2026: Spirou Basket
- 2026–present: SCM Timișoara
Medals
Men's basketball
Representing Bosnia and Herzegovina
FIBA Europe Under-16 Championship
Gold medal – first place	2015 Lithuania	National Team

Njegoš Sikiraš (Serbian Cyrillic: Његош Сикираш, born April 11, 1999) is а Bosnian professional basketball player for SCM Timișoara of the Liga Națională. Standing at 2.06 m (6 ft 9 in) tall and weighing 95 kg (210 lb), he plays the power forward position.

== Professional career ==
Njegoš was born in Pale. He started playing basketball at his local club Tri Poena when he was 12 years old, at the advice of his sister. After playing for KK Budućnost Bijeljina he moved to A.S. Stella Azzurra in August 2013. After a move to Alba Berlin due to disagreement between the clubs about the transfer fee he signed 5-year contract with Baloncesto Fuenlabrada in March 2017.

In August 2021, Njegoš signed for Borac Banja Luka.

On June 25, 2025, he signed with Spirou Basket of the BNXT League.

== Awards and accomplishments ==
=== Bosnian national team ===
- 2015 FIBA Europe Under-16 Championship: Gold

=== Individual ===
- 2015 FIBA Europe U-16 Championship All-Tournament Team
