= 2008 FIBA Europe Under-16 Championship Division B =

- 2008 FIBA Europe Under-16 Championship Division B

Tournament details
- Host country: Bosnia and Herzegovina
- Teams: 23

Final positions
- Champions: Germany (2nd title)

The 2008 FIBA Europe Under-16 Championship Division B was an international basketball competition held in Bosnia and Herzegovina in 2008.

== Medalists ==
1. Germany

2. Montenegro

3. Bulgaria

== Final ranking (comparative) ==
1. Germany

2. Slovenia

3. Montenegro

4. Bosnia and Herzegovina

5. Bulgaria

6. Sweden

7. Switzerland

8. Belgium

9. Estonia

10. Belarus

11. Finland

12. England

13. Austria

14. Iceland

15. (North Macedonia) Macedonia

16. Netherlands

17. Slovakia

18. Denmark

19. Romania

20. Portugal

21. Cyprus

22. Luxembourg

23. (Republic of Ireland) Ireland
