= 2023 FIBA U16 European Championship =

Tournament details
- Host country: North Macedonia
- City: Skopje
- Dates: 5–13 August 2023
- Teams: 16 (from 1 confederation)
- Venue(s): 2 (in 1 host city)

Final positions
- Champions: Spain (6th title)
- Runners-up: Italy
- Third place: France

Official website
- www.fiba.basketball/history

The 2023 FIBA U16 European Championship was the 35th edition of the European basketball championship for men's national under-16 teams. The tournament was played from 5 to 13 August 2023 in Skopje, North Macedonia. The top five teams qualified for the 2024 FIBA Under-17 Basketball World Cup in Turkey besides Turkey who automatically qualified as host.

== Participating teams ==
- Belgium ▲ (Third place, 2022 FIBA U16 European Championship Division B)
- Finland ▲ (Runners-up, 2022 FIBA U16 European Championship Division B)
- France
- Germany ▲ (Winners, 2022 FIBA U16 European Championship Division B)
- Greece
- Israel
- Italy
- Latvia
- Lithuania
- Montenegro
- North Macedonia
- Poland
- Serbia
- Slovenia
- Spain
- Turkey

== First round ==
The draw of the first round was held on 14 February 2023 in Freising, Germany.

In the first round, the teams were drawn into four groups of four. All teams advanced to the playoffs.

All times are local (Central European Summer Time – UTC+2).

=== Group A ===
Pos	Team	Pld	W	L	PF	PA	PD	Pts
1	Italy	3	3	0	272	211	+61	6
2	Slovenia	3	2	1	232	210	+22	5
3	Montenegro	3	1	2	215	243	−28	4
4	Turkey	3	0	3	199	254	−55	3

Source: FIBA

5 August 2023
13:30

Boxscore

Slovenia	84–67	Montenegro
Scoring by quarter: 29–12, 19–19, 21–15, 15–20

SRC Kale, Skopje

5 August 2023
16:00

Boxscore

Italy	101–68	Turkey
Scoring by quarter: 22–22, 28–16, 29–16, 22–14

SRC Kale, Skopje

6 August 2023
13:30

Boxscore

Turkey	60–74	Slovenia
Scoring by quarter: 13–19, 23–29, 10–15, 14–11

Boris Trajkovski Sports Center, Skopje

6 August 2023
21:00

Boxscore

Montenegro	69–88	Italy
Scoring by quarter: 11–19, 23–25, 15–24, 20–20

Boris Trajkovski Sports Center, Skopje

7 August 2023
16:00

Boxscore

Slovenia	74–83	Italy
Scoring by quarter: 17–24, 21–21, 22–13, 14–25

SRC Kale, Skopje

7 August 2023
21:00

Boxscore

Turkey	71–79	Montenegro
Scoring by quarter: 11–13, 23–16, 18–27, 19–23

Boris Trajkovski Sports Center, Skopje

=== Group B ===
Pos	Team	Pld	W	L	PF	PA	PD	Pts
1	Lithuania	3	3	0	270	194	+76	6
2	France	3	2	1	286	219	+67	5
3	North Macedonia (H)	3	1	2	171	265	−94	4
4	Belgium	3	0	3	166	215	−49	3

Source: FIBA
(H) Hosts

5 August 2023
18:30

Boxscore

North Macedonia	63–57	Belgium
Scoring by quarter: 20–18, 12–13, 14–16, 17–10

SRC Kale, Skopje

5 August 2023
21:00

Boxscore

Lithuania	102–94	France
Scoring by quarter: 23–25, 24–28, 25–17, 30–24

SRC Kale, Skopje

6 August 2023
16:00

Boxscore

Belgium	48–73	Lithuania
Scoring by quarter: 14–20, 14–25, 10–11, 10–17

Boris Trajkovski Sports Center, Skopje

6 August 2023
18:30

Boxscore

France	113–56	North Macedonia
Scoring by quarter: 27–19, 33–13, 27–14, 26–10

SRC Kale, Skopje

7 August 2023
13:30

Boxscore

France	79–61	Belgium
Scoring by quarter: 26–15, 10–17, 23–6, 20–23

Boris Trajkovski Sports Center, Skopje

7 August 2023
18:30

Boxscore

North Macedonia	52–95	Lithuania
Scoring by quarter: 16–23, 10–15, 17–32, 9–25

SRC Kale, Skopje

=== Group C ===
Pos	Team	Pld	W	L	PF	PA	PD	Pts
1	Spain	3	3	0	281	176	+105	6
2	Germany	3	2	1	218	181	+37	5
3	Israel	3	1	2	186	226	−40	4
4	Finland	3	0	3	160	262	−102	3

Source: FIBA

5 August 2023
13:30

Boxscore

Germany	96–57	Finland
Scoring by quarter: 24–5, 25–18, 26–21, 21–13

Boris Trajkovski Sports Center, Skopje

5 August 2023
16:00

Boxscore

Israel	61–116	Spain
Scoring by quarter: 11–31, 13–36, 15–28, 22–21

Boris Trajkovski Sports Center, Skopje

6 August 2023
13:30

Boxscore

Finland	51–69	Israel
Scoring by quarter: 16–15, 18–17, 6–22, 11–15

SRC Kale, Skopje

6 August 2023
21:00

Boxscore

Spain	68–63	Germany
Scoring by quarter: 20–24, 13–12, 18–12, 17–15

SRC Kale, Skopje

7 August 2023
16:00

Boxscore

Germany	59–56	Israel
Scoring by quarter: 11–13, 9–7, 23–17, 16–19

Boris Trajkovski Sports Center, Skopje

7 August 2023
18:30

Boxscore

Spain	97–52	Finland
Scoring by quarter: 34–12, 21–13, 24–10, 18–17

Boris Trajkovski Sports Center, Skopje

=== Group D ===
Pos	Team	Pld	W	L	PF	PA	PD	Pts
1	Greece	3	3	0	232	199	+33	6
2	Serbia	3	2	1	219	177	+42	5
3	Poland	3	1	2	213	221	−8	4
4	Latvia	3	0	3	187	254	−67	3

Source: FIBA

5 August 2023
18:30

Boxscore

Latvia	60–94	Poland
Scoring by quarter: 10–21, 16–24, 14–22, 20–27

Boris Trajkovski Sports Center, Skopje

5 August 2023
21:00

Boxscore

Serbia	55–75	Greece
Scoring by quarter: 15–24, 8–9, 14–23, 18–19

Boris Trajkovski Sports Center, Skopje

6 August 2023
16:00

Boxscore

Greece	77–71	Latvia
Scoring by quarter: 22–19, 14–20, 15–12, 26–20

SRC Kale, Skopje

6 August 2023
18:30

Boxscore

Poland	46–81	Serbia
Scoring by quarter: 10–16, 8–23, 15–18, 13–24

Boris Trajkovski Sports Center, Skopje

7 August 2023
13:30

Boxscore

Latvia	56–83	Serbia
Scoring by quarter: 13–15, 22–17, 11–26, 10–25

SRC Kale, Skopje

7 August 2023
21:00

Boxscore

Greece	80–73	Poland
Scoring by quarter: 23–19, 16–17, 15–14, 26–23

SRC Kale, Skopje

== Playoff brackets ==
=== Main bracket ===
Round of 16
9 August
Italy	102
Belgium	72
9 August
Germany	80
Poland	47
9 August
France	91
Montenegro	50
9 August
Greece	81
Finland	70
9 August
Slovenia	100
North Macedonia	65
9 August
Spain	100
Latvia	48
9 August
Lithuania	73
Turkey	66
9 August
Serbia	70
Israel	64

Quarterfinals
10 August
Italy	75
Germany	56
10 August
France	86
Greece	72
10 August
Slovenia	79
Spain	82
10 August
Lithuania	66
Serbia	63

Semifinals
12 August
Italy	77
France	63
12 August
Spain	80
Lithuania	63

Final
13 August
Italy	68
Spain	77
3rd place match
13 August
France	88
Lithuania	62

=== 5th place bracket ===
5th–8th place semifinals
12 August
Germany	79
Greece	73
12 August
Slovenia	74
Serbia	72

5th place match
13 August
Germany	65
Slovenia	52
7th place match
13 August
Greece	60
Serbia	71

=== 9th place bracket ===
9th–16th place quarterfinals
10 August
Belgium	58
Poland	76
10 August
Montenegro	65
Finland	74
10 August
North Macedonia	46
Latvia	57
10 August
Turkey	85
Israel	49

9th–12th place semifinals
12 August
Poland	79
Finland	49
12 August
Latvia	57
Turkey	75

9th place match
13 August
Poland	61
Turkey	54
11th place match
13 August
Finland	63
Latvia	73

=== 13th place bracket ===
13th–16th place semifinals
12 August
Belgium	70
Montenegro	83
12 August
North Macedonia	48
Israel	71

13th place match
13 August
Montenegro	63
Israel	81
15th place match
13 August
Belgium	90
North Macedonia	72

== Playoff results ==
=== Round of 16 ===
9 August 2023
13:30

Boxscore

France	91–50	Montenegro
Scoring by quarter: 22–13, 28–7, 21–18, 20–12

SRC Kale, Skopje

9 August 2023
13:30

Boxscore

Germany	80–47	Poland
Scoring by quarter: 16–7, 27–9, 29–10, 8–21

Boris Trajkovski Sports Center, Skopje

9 August 2023
16:00

Boxscore

Italy	102–72	Belgium
Scoring by quarter: 25–17, 32–22, 32–16, 13–17

Boris Trajkovski Sports Center, Skopje

9 August 2023
16:00

Boxscore

Greece	81–70	Finland
Scoring by quarter: 27–16, 17–17, 19–19, 18–18

SRC Kale, Skopje

9 August 2023
18:30

Boxscore

Slovenia	100–65	North Macedonia
Scoring by quarter: 25–10, 31–18, 15–22, 29–15

SRC Kale, Skopje

9 August 2023
18:30

Boxscore

Serbia	70–64	Israel
Scoring by quarter: 15–22, 21–20, 22–9, 12–13

Boris Trajkovski Sports Center, Skopje

9 August 2023
21:00

Boxscore

Lithuania	73–66	Turkey
Scoring by quarter: 25–10, 18–16, 10–12, 20–28

Boris Trajkovski Sports Center, Skopje

9 August 2023
21:00

Boxscore

Spain	100–48	Latvia
Scoring by quarter: 26–18, 24–4, 25–13, 25–13

SRC Kale, Skopje

=== 9th–16th place quarterfinals ===
10 August 2023
13:30

Boxscore

Belgium	58–76	Poland
Scoring by quarter: 8–21, 14–18, 21–13, 15–24

SRC Kale, Skopje

10 August 2023
16:00

Boxscore

Montenegro	65–74	Finland
Scoring by quarter: 11–15, 18–26, 24–11, 12–22

SRC Kale, Skopje

10 August 2023
18:30

Boxscore

North Macedonia	46–57	Latvia
Scoring by quarter: 10–17, 18–12, 12–20, 6–8

SRC Kale, Skopje

10 August 2023
21:00

Boxscore

Turkey	85–49	Israel
Scoring by quarter: 14–11, 25–10, 22–17, 24–11

SRC Kale, Skopje

=== 13th–16th place semifinals ===
12 August 2023
13:30

Boxscore

Belgium	70–83	Montenegro
Scoring by quarter: 19–16, 20–30, 9–19, 22–18

SRC Kale, Skopje

12 August 2023
16:00

Boxscore

North Macedonia	48–71	Israel
Scoring by quarter: 11–21, 8–18, 20–15, 9–17

SRC Kale, Skopje

=== 15th place match ===
13 August 2023
11:00

Boxscore

Belgium	90–72	North Macedonia
Scoring by quarter: 21–17, 20–18, 24–16, 25–21

SRC Kale, Skopje

=== 13th place match ===
13 August 2023
16:00

Boxscore

Montenegro	63–81	Israel
Scoring by quarter: 17–21, 18–23, 11–27, 17–10

Boris Trajkovski Sports Center, Skopje

=== 9th–12th place semifinals ===
12 August 2023
18:30

Boxscore

Poland	79–49	Finland
Scoring by quarter: 15–16, 31–9, 19–8, 14–16

SRC Kale, Skopje

12 August 2023
21:00

Boxscore

Latvia	57–75	Turkey
Scoring by quarter: 14–18, 13–15, 13–24, 17–18

SRC Kale, Skopje

=== 11th place match ===
13 August 2023
16:00

Boxscore

Finland	63–73	Latvia
Scoring by quarter: 11–12, 19–12, 19–28, 14–21

SRC Kale, Skopje

=== 9th place match ===
13 August 2023
18:30

Boxscore

Poland	61–54	Turkey
Scoring by quarter: 10–13, 21–15, 20–11, 10–15

SRC Kale, Skopje

=== Championship quarterfinals ===
10 August 2023
13:30

Boxscore

Italy	75–56	Germany
Scoring by quarter: 22–11, 21–21, 16–18, 16–6

Boris Trajkovski Sports Center, Skopje

10 August 2023
16:00

Boxscore

France	86–72	Greece
Scoring by quarter: 28–13, 23–23, 19–17, 16–19

Boris Trajkovski Sports Center, Skopje

10 August 2023
18:30

Boxscore

Slovenia	79–82	Spain
Scoring by quarter: 22–15, 17–24, 26–22, 14–21

Boris Trajkovski Sports Center, Skopje

10 August 2023
21:00

Boxscore

Lithuania	66–63	Serbia
Scoring by quarter: 12–17, 12–14, 18–15, 24–17

Boris Trajkovski Sports Center, Skopje

=== 5th–8th place semifinals ===
12 August 2023
13:30

Boxscore

Germany	79–73	Greece
Scoring by quarter: 16–21, 16–21, 25–12, 22–19

Boris Trajkovski Sports Center, Skopje

12 August 2023
16:00

Boxscore

Slovenia	74–72	Serbia
Scoring by quarter: 9–9, 25–23, 19–17, 21–23

Boris Trajkovski Sports Center, Skopje

=== 7th place match ===
13 August 2023
13:30

Boxscore

Greece	60–71	Serbia
Scoring by quarter: 19–15, 13–16, 12–19, 16–21

SRC Kale, Skopje

=== 5th place match ===
13 August 2023
13:30

Boxscore

Germany	65–52	Slovenia
Scoring by quarter: 16–15, 8–10, 21–11, 20–16

Boris Trajkovski Sports Center, Skopje

=== Championship semifinals ===
12 August 2023
18:30

Boxscore

Italy	77–63	France
Scoring by quarter: 18–20, 19–15, 16–9, 24–19

Boris Trajkovski Sports Center, Skopje

12 August 2023
21:00

Boxscore

Spain	80–63	Lithuania
Scoring by quarter: 27–19, 8–17, 25–20, 20–7

Boris Trajkovski Sports Center, Skopje

=== 3rd place match ===
13 August 2023
18:30

Boxscore

France	88–62	Lithuania
Scoring by quarter: 20–10, 27–15, 19–21, 22–16

Boris Trajkovski Sports Center, Skopje

=== Final ===
13 August 2023
21:00

Boxscore

Italy	68–77	Spain
Scoring by quarter: 19–22, 13–19, 15–12, 21–24

Boris Trajkovski Sports Center, Skopje

== Final standings ==
Rank	Team	Record
1st place, gold medalist(s)	Spain	7–0
2nd place, silver medalist(s)	Italy	6–1
3rd place, bronze medalist(s)	France	5–2
4	Lithuania	5–2
5	Germany	5–2
6	Slovenia	4–3
7	Serbia	3–4
8	Greece	4–3
9	Poland	4–3
10	Turkey	2–5
11	Latvia	2–5
12	Finland	1–6
13	Israel	3–4
14	Montenegro	2–5
15	Belgium	1–6
16	North Macedonia	1–6

Qualified for the 2024 FIBA Under-17 Basketball World Cup
Qualified for the 2024 FIBA Under-17 Basketball World Cup as the host nation
Relegated to the 2024 FIBA U16 EuroBasket Division B

== See also ==
- 2023 FIBA U16 European Championship Division B
