= 2007 FIBA Europe Under-16 Championship Division B =

- 2007 FIBA Europe Under-16 Championship Division B

Tournament details
- Host country: Republic of Macedonia
- Teams: 21

Final positions
- Champions: Poland (1st title)

The 2007 FIBA Europe Under-16 Championship Division B was an international basketball competition held in Macedonia in 2007.

== Medalists ==
1. Poland

2. Hungary

3. Sweden

== Final ranking (comparative) ==
1. Montenegro

2. Sweden

3. Finland

4. England

5. Poland

6. Bosnia and Herzegovina

7. Netherlands

8. Hungary

9. Germany

10. Cyprus

11. Austria

12. Estonia

13. Belgium

14. Norway

15. Slovakia

16. (Republic of Ireland) Ireland

17. Belarus

18. Bulgaria

19. Romania

20. (North Macedonia) Macedonia

21. Armenia
