= Ahmet Can Duran =

Turkish basketball player (born 1999)

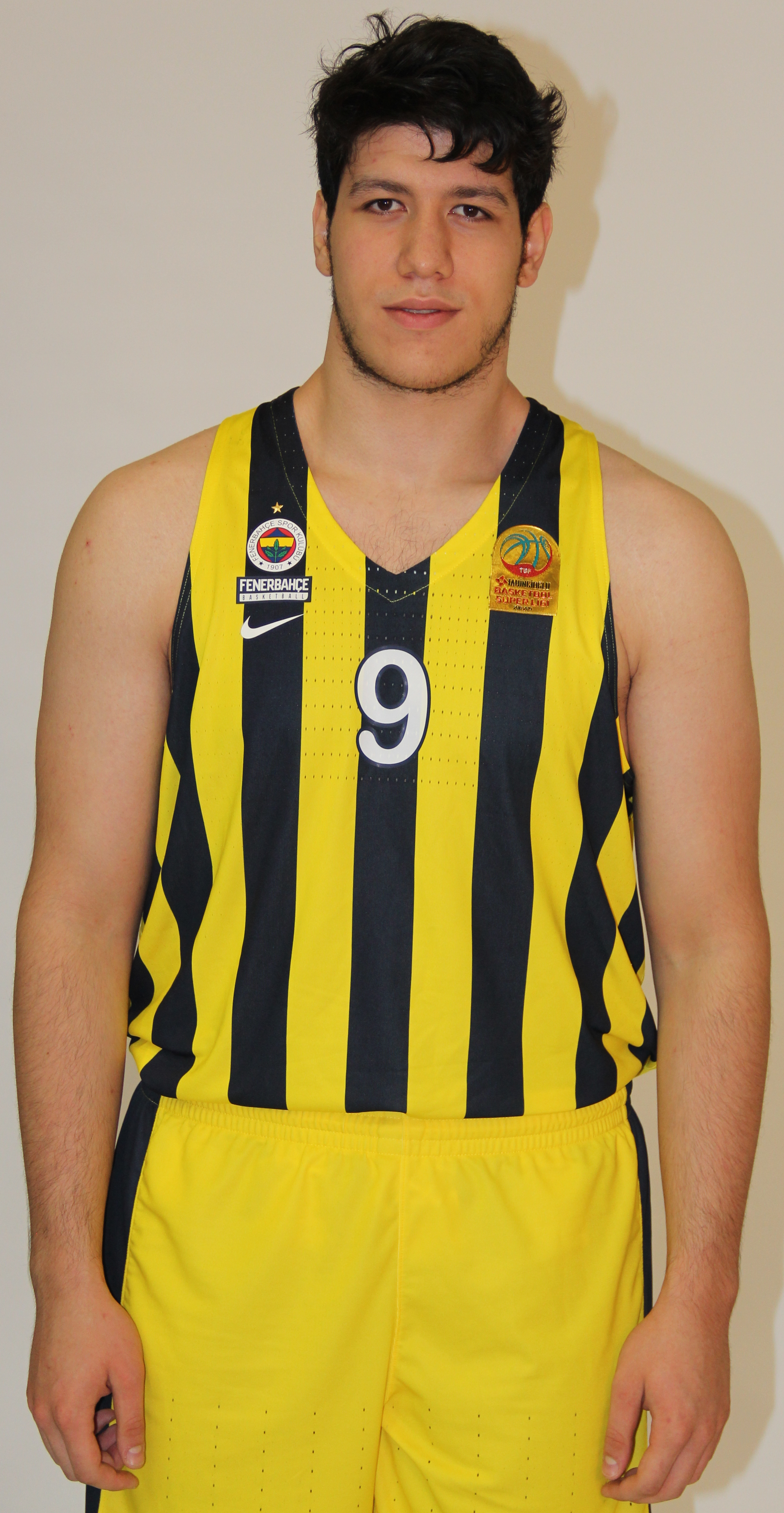

No. 14 – Konya BB
- Position: Center

Personal information
- Born: January 28, 1999 (age 27) Afyon, Turkey
- Listed height: 2.08 m (6 ft 10 in)
- Listed weight: 108 kg (238 lb)

Career information
- Playing career: 2014–present

Career history
- 2016–2019: Fenerbahçe
- 2020–2021: Büyükçekmece Basketbol
- 2021–2023: Fenerbahçe
- 2021–2023: → Fenerbahçe Koleji
- 2023–2024: Bursaspor
- 2024–present: Konya BB

Career highlights
- EuroLeague champion (2017); Turkish League champion (2017); Turkish President's Cup winner (2016)
Medals
Men's basketball
Representing Turkey
FIBA Europe Under-16 Championship
| Bronze medal – third place | 2015 Lithuania |
FIBA Under-17 World Championship
| Silver medal – second place | 2016 Spain |

Ahmet Can Duran (born January 28, 1999) is a Turkish professional basketball player. Standing at a height of 2.08 m (6 ft 10 in), he plays the center position.

== Early career ==
Duran began playing with the youth teams of the Turkish club Fenerbahçe in 2014.

== Professional career ==
After playing with the junior teams of Fenerbahçe, Duran began his pro career in 2016, with the senior men's team of Fenerbahçe.

On August 23, 2020, he has signed with Büyükçekmece Basketbol of the Turkish Basketbol Süper Ligi (BSL).

On August 2, 2023, he signed with Bursaspor of the Turkish Basketbol Süper Ligi (BSL).

== Turkish national team ==
With the junior national teams of Turkey, Duran played at the 2014 FIBA Europe Under-16 Championship, and at the 2015 FIBA Europe Under-16 Championship, where he won a bronze medal and was a member of the All-Tournament Team. He also won the silver medal at the 2016 FIBA Under-17 World Championship. He also played at the 2016 FIBA Europe Under-18 Championship.
