= 1995 FIBA Europe Under-16 Championship =

1995 EuroBasket Under-16
13th FIBA Europe Under-16 Championship

Tournament details
- Host country: Portugal
- Dates: 23–30 July 1995
- Teams: 12
- Venue(s): (in 3 host cities)

Final positions
- Champions: Croatia (1st title)

Tournament statistics
- Top scorer: (Israel) Ilan Kadosh (29.8)
- Top rebounds: (France) Pawel Storozynski (11.9)
- Top assists: (Spain) Javier Rodríguez (3.1)
- PPG (Team): Spain (80.7)
- RPG (Team): Spain (36.7)
- APG (Team): Spain (7.9)

Official website
- Official website (archive)

The 1995 FIBA Europe Under-16 Championship (known at that time as the 1995 European Championship for Cadets) was the 13th edition of the FIBA Europe Under-16 Championship. The cities of Setúbal, Seixal, and Almada, in Portugal, hosted the tournament. Croatia won the trophy for the first time.

== Teams ==
- Croatia
- Czech Republic
- England
- Finland
- France
- Greece
- Israel
- Italy
- Macedonia
- Portugal
- Spain
- Turkey

== Qualification ==
There were two qualifying rounds for this tournament. Twenty-five national teams entered the qualifying round. Fifteen teams advanced to the Challenge Round, where they joined Russia, Lithuania, and Turkey. The remaining eighteen teams were allocated in three groups of six teams each. The three top teams of each group joined Greece (title holder), Spain (runner-up), and Portugal (host) in the final tournament.

== Preliminary round ==
The twelve teams were allocated in two groups of six teams each.

Team advanced to Semifinals
Team competed in 5th–8th playoffs
Team competed in 9th–12th playoffs

=== Group A ===
Team	Pld	W	L	PF	PA	Pts
Spain	5	5	0	429	285	10
Macedonia	5	3	2	339	372	8
Italy	5	3	2	363	319	8
Israel	5	2	3	375	386	7
England	5	1	4	305	419	6
Czech Republic	5	0	5	328	358	6

=== Group B ===
Team	Pld	W	L	PF	PA	Pts
Croatia	5	5	0	377	284	10
Greece	5	4	1	344	307	9
France	5	2	3	354	351	7
Turkey	5	2	3	296	282	7
Portugal	5	2	3	328	369	7
Finland	5	0	5	319	425	5

== Knockout stage ==
=== 9th–12th playoffs ===
Playoffs
Czech Republic	74
Portugal	88
England	61
Finland	67

Ninth place
Portugal	75
Finland	47
Eleventh place
Czech Republic	65
England	57

=== 5th–8th playoffs ===
Playoffs
France	71
Israel	54
Italy	66
Turkey	60

Fifth place
France	70
Italy	98
Seventh place
Israel	77
Turkey	80

=== Championship ===
Semifinals
Croatia	66
Macedonia	45
Spain	74
Greece	64

Final
Croatia	75
Spain	62
Third place
Macedonia	72
Greece	73

1995 FIBA Europe U-16 Championship

Croatia
First title

== Final standings ==
Rank	Team
Gold medal	Croatia
Silver medal	Spain
Bronze medal	Greece
4th	Macedonia
5th	Italy
6th	France
7th	Turkey
8th	Israel
9th	Portugal
10th	Finland
11th	Czech Republic
12th	England
