= Dimitrios Moraitis =

Greek basketball player (born 1999)

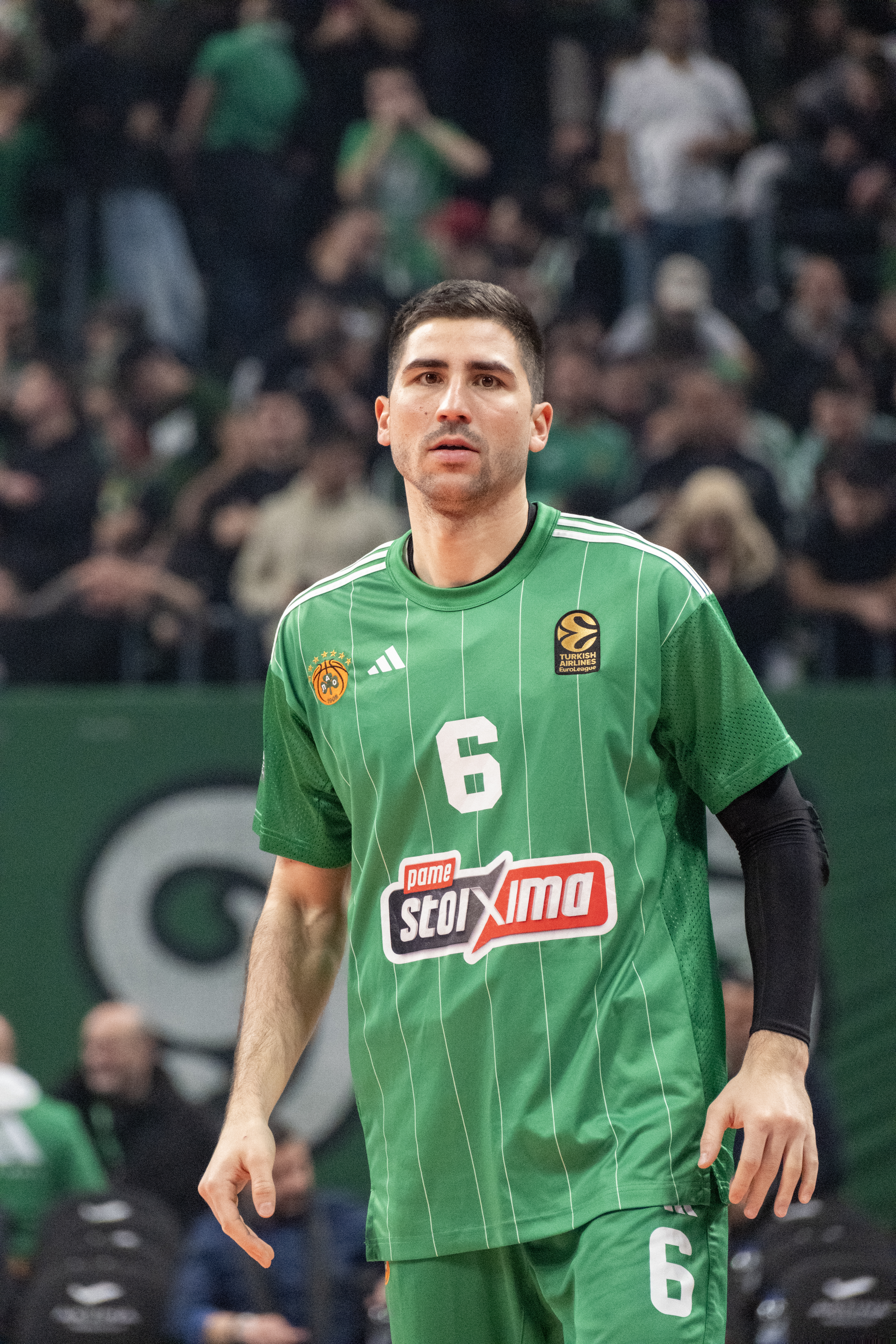
- Moraitis with Panathinaikos in 2025

No. 6 – Panathinaikos
- Position: Point guard / shooting guard
- League: Greek Basketball League; EuroLeague

Personal information
- Born: 3 February 1999 (age 27) Marousi, Greece
- Listed height: 6 ft 4.5 in (1.94 m)
- Listed weight: 86 kg (190 lb)

Career information
- NBA draft: 2021: undrafted
- Playing career: 2014–present

Career history
- 2014–2015: Panionios
- 2015–2021: AEK Athens
- 2019–2020: →Kolossos Rodos
- 2021–2023: Peristeri
- 2023–present: Panathinaikos
- 2025–2026: →Iraklis Thessaloniki

Career highlights
- EuroLeague champion (2024); FIBA Champions League champion (2018); FIBA Intercontinental Cup champion (2019); Greek League champion (2024); 2× Greek Cup winner (2018, 2025); Greek League steals leader (2026); 2× Greek Youth All-Star Game (2019, 2020); Jordan Brand Classic (2015); Panhellenic Junior Championship champion (2015); Panhellenic Junior Championship MVP (2015)

Dimitrios Rafail Moraitis (alternate spelling: Dimitris Rafail Moraitis) (Greek: Δημήτρης Ραφαήλ Μωραΐτης; born February 3, 1999) is a Greek professional basketball player for Panathinaikos BC of the Greek Basketball League (GBL) and the EuroLeague. He is a 1.94 m (6 ft 4 1/2 in) tall combo guard.

== Youth career ==
Moraitis played from a young age with the youth teams of the Greek club Panionios, before he started his pro career. He played at the Jordan Brand Classic's International Game in 2015, where he recorded 7 points, 1 assist, 1 block, and 1 turnover in 28 minutes.

== Professional career ==
Moraitis signed his first contract with the senior men's team of Panionios in 2014. On 20 July 2015, AEK confirmed that Moraitis would join the club from Panionios, for a transfer buyout amount fee of €1,200,000. Moraitis signed a six-year contract with AEK.

Moraitis made his Greek League debut with AEK, in a win against Nea Kifissia, on November 21, 2015. He scored his first points in the Greek League, in a game against Rethymno Cretan Kings, on March 11, 2016, but his team lost the game, 70–69. After the departure of Taurean Green from AEK, due to an episode he had with the team's head coach, Jure Zdovc, during a 2016 Greek League playoffs game against Olympiacos, Moraitis gained some more playing time.

With AEK, he won the Greek Cup title, in 2018, and the FIBA Champions League title as well. On July 27, 2018, Moraitis extended his contract with AEK for an extra year, through the 2021–22 season. During the preseason of the 2018–19 season, Moraitis played with AEK at the "Neophytos Chandriotis" tournament. AEK won the tournament, and Moraitis was named the MVP, averaging 11.6 points, 4 assists, and 2.3 rebounds per game.

On August 17, 2019, Moraitis was loaned to Kolossos Rodou of the Greek Basket League for the 2019–2020 season.

On July 23, 2021, Moraitis signed a two-year deal with Peristeri. During the 2021-22 campaign, in a total of 21 league games, he averaged 9.3 points, 3.3 rebounds, 4.5 assists and 1.2 steals, playing around 23 minutes per contest. On July 1, 2022, Moraitis signed a new two-year contract with the club through 2024, playing under head coach Vassilis Spanoulis. In 32 league games, he averaged 7.2 points, 2.4 rebounds and 2.5 assists, playing around 18 minutes per contest. On June 21, 2023, Moraitis amicably parted ways with Peristeri.

On June 23, 2023, Moraitis signed a three-year contract with Greek Basket League and EuroLeague powerhouse Panathinaikos. On June 17, 2025, Moraitis signed a one-year contract with Iraklis of the Greek Basketball League, on loan from Panathinaikos.

== National team career ==
=== Greek junior national team ===
Moraitis has been a member of the junior national teams of Greece. With Greece's junior national teams, he has played at the following tournaments: the 2014 FIBA Europe Under-16 Championship, the 2015 FIBA Europe Under-16 Championship, the 2016 FIBA Europe Under-18 Championship, the 2017 FIBA Europe Under-18 Championship, and the 2018 FIBA Europe Under-20 Championship.

=== Greek senior national team ===
Moraitis played with the senior Greek national team at the 2023 FIBA World Cup qualifiers and at Paris 2024 Olympic Games .

== Personal life ==
Moraitis' father, Kostas Moraitis, is a former professional basketball player, who played in the Greek League during the 1990s.

== Career statistics ==
Legend
GP	Games played	GS	Games started	MPG	Minutes per game
FG%	Field-goal percentage	3P%	3-point field-goal percentage	FT%	Free-throw percentage
RPG	Rebounds per game	APG	Assists per game	SPG	Steals per game
BPG	Blocks per game	PPG	Points per game	PIR	Performance index rating
**Bold**	Career high

=== EuroLeague ===
†	Denotes season in which Moraitis team won the EuroLeague

Year	Team	GP	GS	MPG	FG%	3P%	FT%	RPG	APG	SPG	BPG	PPG	PIR
2023–24†	Panathinaikos	7	0	2.4	.500	.750	—	.3	.7	.3	—	1.6	1.7
Career		7	0	2.4	.500	.750	—	.3	.7	.3	—	1.6	1.7

=== Basketball Champions League ===
†	Denotes season in which Moraitis team won the Basketball Champions League

Year	Team	GP	GS	MPG	FG%	3P%	FT%	RPG	APG	SPG	BPG	PPG
2016–17	AEK Athens	1	0	3.3	.000	.000	—	—	—	—	—	0.0
2017–18†	AEK Athens	4	0	1.7	.000	.000	—	.2	—	—	—	0.0
2018–19	AEK Athens	**9**	**2**	9.2	.250	.182	**.875**	.9	.8	.4	**.1**	2.1
2020–21	AEK Athens	8	**2**	**17.9**	**.424**	**.476**	.818	1.9	2.1	**.7**	—	**5.9**
2022–23	Peristeri	8	1	15.9	.300	.333	.500	**2.6**	**2.4**	**.7**	—	5.5
Career		30	5	12.1	.318	.338	.741	1.5	1.4	.5	.0	3.7

=== FIBA Europe Cup ===
Year	Team	GP	GS	MPG	FG%	3P%	FT%	RPG	APG	SPG	BPG	PPG
2021–22	Peristeri	14	14	37.9	.513	.286	.803	4.8	3.7	2.1	.3	22.2
Career		14	14	37.9	.513	.286	.803	4.8	3.7	2.1	.3	22.2

=== Domestic leagues ===
Year	Team	League	GP	MPG	FG%	3P%	FT%	RPG	APG	SPG	BPG	PPG
2014–15	(Greece) Panionios	GBL	4	7.3	.500	.571	1.000	.7	1.2	1.2	—	3.7
2015–16	(Greece) AEK Athens	GBL	4	4.3	.250	.250	—	.5	—	.2	—	0.7
2016–17	(Greece) AEK Athens	GBL	6	7.2	.364	.500	.250	.3	—	.3	—	2.0
2017–18	(Greece) AEK Athens	GBL	6	6.6	.625	.500	.750	.5	1.0	.5	—	2.7
2018–19	(Greece) AEK Athens	GBL	28	10.1	.324	.231	.500	1.2	1.3	.4	—	2.4
2019–20	(Greece) Kolossos Rodou	GBL	20	14.3	.429	.283	.593	1.8	2.1	.8	.1	4.7
2020–21	(Greece) AEK Athens	GBL	19	12.2	.302	.279	.833	1.0	1.4	.6	—	3.2
2021–22	(Greece) Peristeri	GBL	21	23.5	.391	.330	.705	3.3	4.5	1.2	—	9.3
2022–23	(Greece) Peristeri	GBL	32	18.3	.402	.308	.844	2.4	2.5	.8	.0	7.2
2023–24	(Greece) Panathinaikos	GBL	23	8.8	.484	.478	.917	1.0	1.2	.9	.1	4.1
