= England men's national under-16 basketball team =

Youth basketball team representing England

England
- FIBA zone: FIBA Europe
- National federation: Basketball England

U17 World Cup
- Appearances: None

U16 EuroBasket
- Appearances: 5
- Medals: None

U16 EuroBasket Division B
- Appearances: 11
- Medals: Silver: 1 (2011); Bronze: 2 (2009, 2014)

The England men's national under-16 basketball team is a national basketball team of England, administered by Basketball England. It represents the country in men's international under-16 basketball competitions.

The team participated five times at the FIBA U16 EuroBasket Division A. They also won three medals at the FIBA U16 EuroBasket Division B.

== FIBA U18 EuroBasket participations ==
Year	Division A	Division B
1973	16th	
1975	18th	
1995	12th	
2004		5th/6th
2005		7th
2006		8th
2007		4th
2008		11th

Year	Division A	Division B
2009		3rd place, bronze medalist(s)
2010		11th
2011		2nd place, silver medalist(s)
2012	16th	
2013		6th
2014		3rd place, bronze medalist(s)
2015	14th	
2016		5th

== See also ==
- England men's national basketball team
- England men's national under-18 basketball team
- England women's national under-16 basketball team
