= Nelson Weidemann =

German basketball player (born 1999)

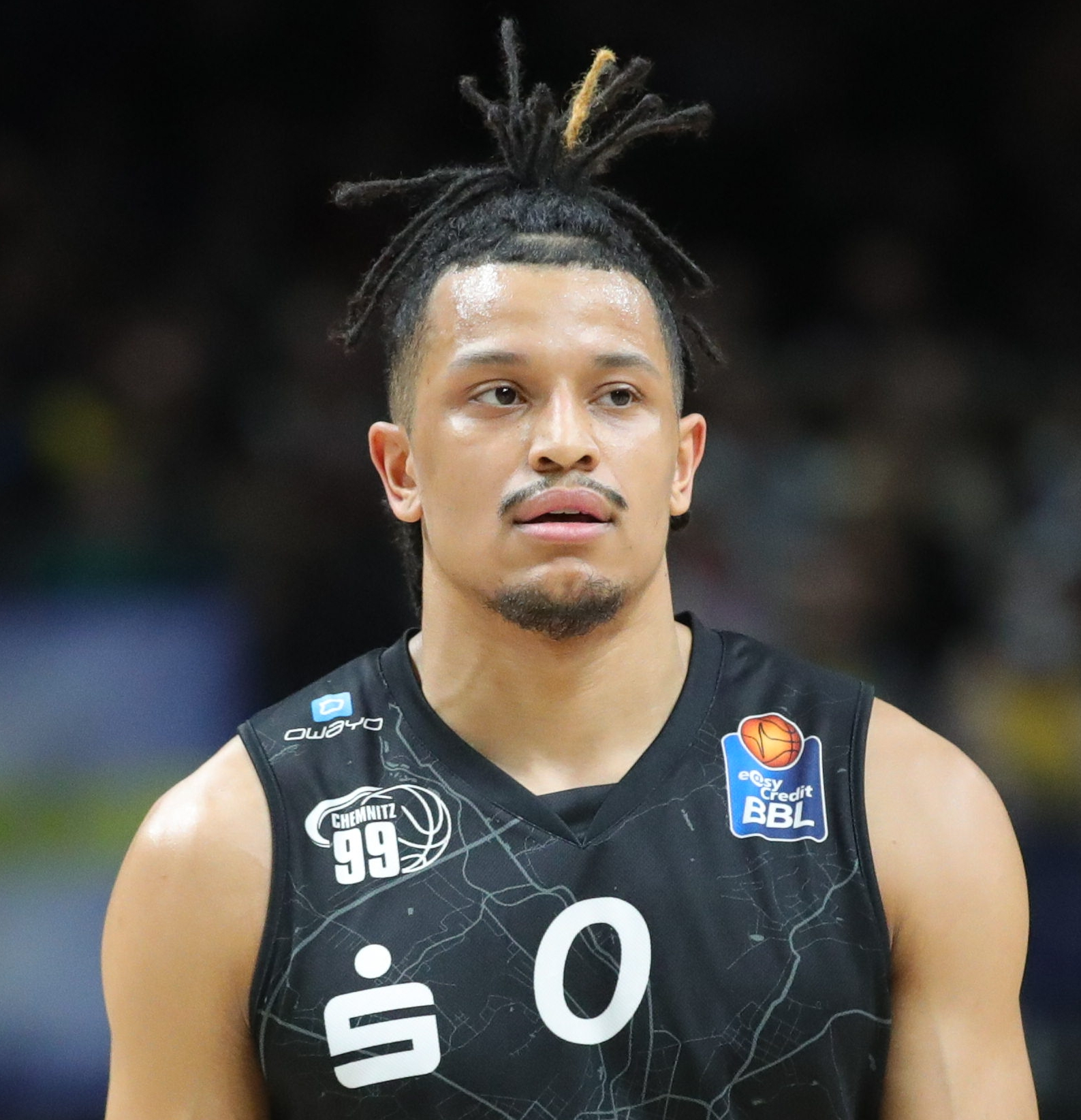
- Weidemann in 2023 with Niners Chemnitz

No. 11 – New Zealand Breakers
- Position: Point guard
- League: NBL

Personal information
- Born: 25 March 1999 (age 27) Berlin, Germany
- Listed height: 1.91 m (6 ft 3 in)
- Listed weight: 75 kg (165 lb)

Career information
- Playing career: 2015–present

Career history
- 2015–2016: Nürnberg Falcons BC
- 2016–2024: Bayern Munich
- 2019–2020: →Brose Bamberg
- 2020–2021: →BG Göttingen
- 2021–2023: →Niners Chemnitz
- 2024–2026: Ratiopharm Ulm
- 2026: Rasta Vechta
- 2026–present: New Zealand Breakers
Medals
Men's basketball
Representing Germany
FIBA U20 European Championship
Bronze medal – third place	2018 Germany	Team

Nelson Jeremias Weidemann (born 25 March 1999) is a German professional basketball player for the New Zealand Breakers of the Australian National Basketball League (NBL). He plays the point guard position.

== Professional career ==
Weidemann started his basketball career in the youth system of Alba Berlin. Prior to the 2015–16 season, Weidemann moved to Nürnberg Falcons BC. At the conclusion of Weidemann's lone season with Nürnberg, he moved to the youth team of Bayern Munich for the 2016–17 season. At the end of his first season with the club, Weidemann helped the Bayern Munich U19 team win the junior championship, and was named MVP.

Three years later, Weidemann was loaned to club Brose Bamberg, heading into the 2019–20 season. At the end of the year, Weidemann was on the move once again, as he was loaned to BG Göttingen for the 2020–21 season. After the season, he was loaned to club Niners Chemnitz for two years, through the 2022–23 campaign.

In June 2023, Weidemann returned to Bayern Munich for the 2023–24 season. Following the season, Weidemann moved to club Ratiopharm Ulm on a two-year contract entering the 2024–25 campaign.

On 8 September 2026, Weidemann signed a three-month contract with Rasta Vechta. After playing in four BBL games and five BCL games to start the 2026–27 season, he signed with the New Zealand Breakers of the Australian National Basketball League (NBL) on 10 October 2026 as a short-term injury replacement.

== National team career ==
Weidemann was selected to represent Germany for the first time internationally at the 2015 FIBA U16 European Championship. He would finish the event leading the Germany U16 national team in scoring at 11.5 points per game.

The following year, Weidemann was a member of the Germany U18 national team that reached the semi-finals at the 2016 FIBA U18 European Championship. He averaged 5.8 points, 2.8 rebounds and 1.7 assists during the competition.

In 2017, he was chosen to represent Germany at the 2017 FIBA U19 World Cup. He finished with averages of 5 points, 3.6 rebounds and 2.9 assists per game.

A year later, Weidemann helped the Germany U20 national team win bronze at the 2018 FIBA U20 European Championship. He produced averages of 6.7 points, 4.2 rebounds and 1.3 assists per game.

In February 2023, Weidemann was called up to the senior Germany national team for the first time. He was selected to the team for Germany's final two matches of their 2023 FIBA World Cup qualifying campaign.

== Career statistics ==
Legend
GP	Games played	GS	Games started	MPG	Minutes per game
FG%	Field-goal percentage	3P%	3-point field-goal percentage	FT%	Free-throw percentage
RPG	Rebounds per game	APG	Assists per game	SPG	Steals per game
BPG	Blocks per game	PPG	Points per game	PIR	Performance index rating
**Bold**	Career high

=== EuroLeague ===
Year	Team	GP	GS	MPG	FG%	3P%	FT%	RPG	APG	SPG	BPG	PPG	PIR
2023–24	Bayern Munich	6	2	4.5	.375	.400	.000	.8	.7	—	—	1.3	0.7
Career		6	2	4.5	.375	.400	.000	.8	.7	—	—	1.3	0.7

=== Basketball Champions League ===
Year	Team	GP	GS	MPG	FG%	3P%	FT%	RPG	APG	SPG	BPG	PPG
2019–20	Bamberg	10	7	9.1	.269	.278	.750	.5	1.0	.5	—	2.2
Career		10	7	9.1	.269	.278	.750	.5	1.0	.5	—	2.2

=== FIBA Europe Cup ===
Year	Team	GP	GS	MPG	FG%	3P%	FT%	RPG	APG	SPG	BPG	PPG
2022–23	Niners Chemnitz	11	4	21.3	.346	.311	.875	3.1	2.9	1.1	—	6.8
Career		11	4	21.3	.346	.311	.875	3.1	2.9	1.1	—	6.8

=== Domestic leagues ===
Year	Team	League	GP	MPG	FG%	3P%	FT%	RPG	APG	SPG	BPG	PPG
2015–16	(Germany) Nürnberg Falcons	ProA	5	5.9	.375	.429	—	.2	.6	—	—	1.8
2016–17	(Germany) Bayern Munich II	ProB	23	20.9	.466	.410	.750	2.3	1.6	1.0	.1	7.7
2017–18	(Germany) Bayern Munich II	ProB	26	26.2	.454	.436	.787	2.6	1.6	.8	.1	10.0
2018–19	(Germany) Bayern Munich II	ProB	25	25.4	.385	.303	.771	4.5	2.8	1.4	.2	13.8
2018–19	(Germany) Bayern Munich	BBL	3	8.4	.200	.000	.667	1.0	.7	.3	—	2.0
2019–20	(Germany) Bamberg	BBL	23	9.7	.493	.409	.783	.6	.9	.2	—	4.4
2020–21	(Germany) Göttingen	BBL	33	14.9	.452	.372	.727	1.4	1.9	.4	.0	6.0
2021–22	(Germany) Niners Chemnitz	BBL	30	20.2	.441	.398	.923	2.3	1.9	1.2	.1	9.4
2022–23	(Germany) Niners Chemnitz	BBL	36	20.4	.403	.314	.859	2.0	2.8	.7	.1	8.7
2023–24	(Germany) Bayern Munich	BBL	23	8.9	.365	.306	1.000	.7	.9	.3	.0	2.8
