= Philipp Herkenhoff =

German basketball player (born 1999)

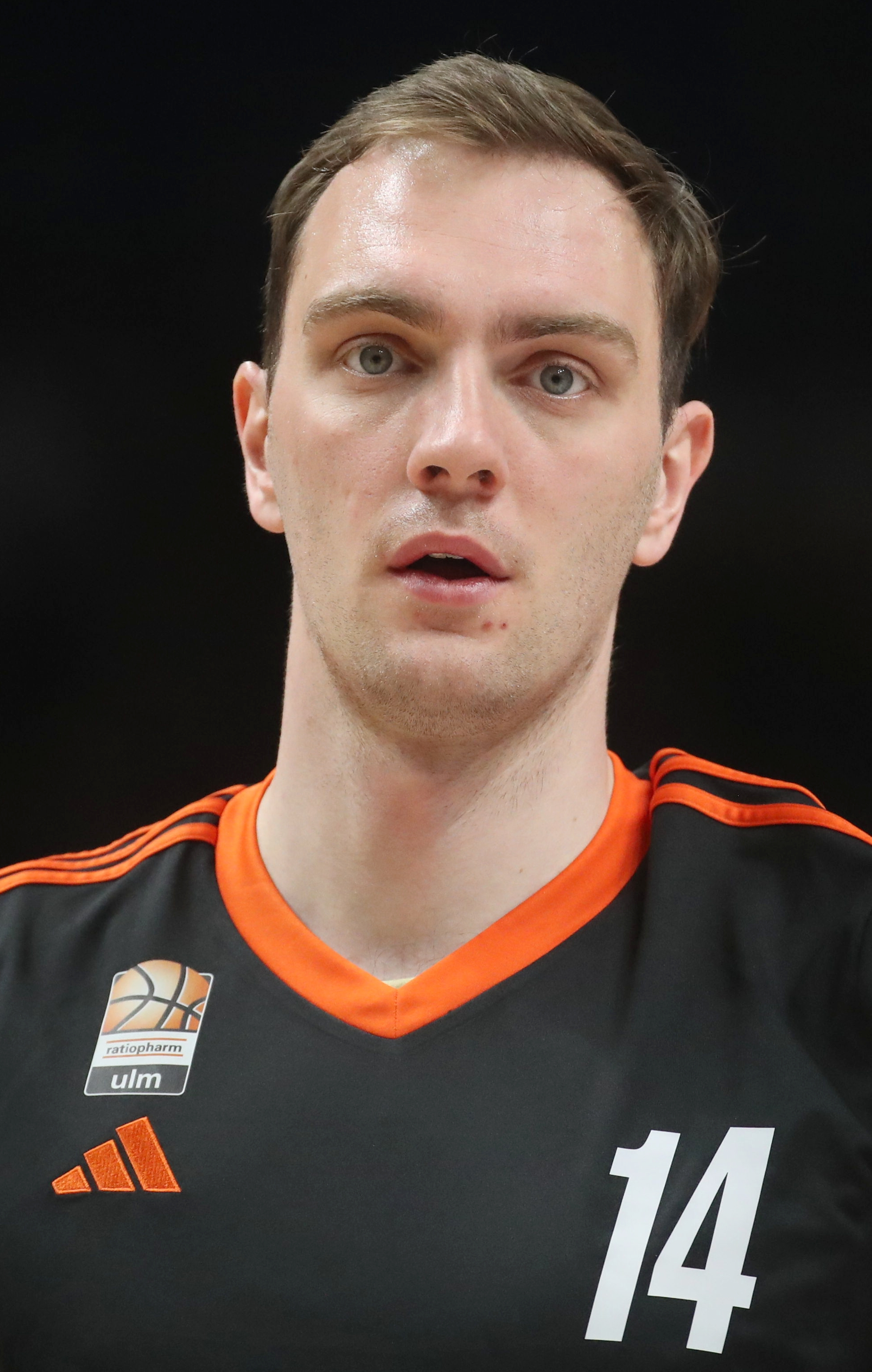
- Herkenhoff with Ratiopharm Ulm in 2025

No. 14 – Rasta Vechta
- Position: Power forward / center
- League: Basketball Bundesliga

Personal information
- Born: 29 July 1999 (age 27) Mettingen, Germany
- Listed height: 2.08 m (6 ft 10 in)

Career information
- Playing career: 2016–present

Career history
- 2016–2021: Rasta Vechta
- 2021–2025: Ratiopharm Ulm
- 2025–present: Rasta Vechta

Philipp Herkenhoff (born 29 July 1999) is a German professional basketball player for Rasta Vechta of the Basketball Bundesliga (BBL). He plays the power forward and center positions.

== Professional career ==
Herkenhoff began his professional career in 2016 with SC Rasta Vechta. During his time there, he played 144 games, including 86 in the Bundesliga, 3 in the BBL-Pokal, 14 in the Basketball Champions League, and 41 in the second-tier ProA league.

In 2021, he signed a multi-year contract with Ratiopharm Ulm.

On July 1, 2025, he signed with Rasta Vechta of the Basketball Bundesliga (BBL) for a second stint after four seasons.

== National team career ==
Herkenhoff was first called up to a national U13 training camp in 2012. He participated in several youth European Championships, including:

- The 2015 U16 European Championship in Lithuania
- The 2016 U18 European Championship (4th place, averaged 1.7 points and rebounds)
- The 2017 U19 World Cup in Egypt (6.4 points per game, 5th place)
- The 2017 U18 European Championship in Slovakia, where he led Germany in scoring (12.0 PPG)

In July 2019, Herkenhoff was part of the German U20 national team that won the bronze medal at the European Championship. He averaged 16.0 points and 8.2 rebounds per game, leading the team in both categories.

He received his first call-up to the senior national team for World Cup qualifying games in November 2018 under head coach Henrik Rödl.
