= Bure (surname) =

Bure (Russian: Буре) is a Swedish and Russian surname that may refer to

- A personal name preservad in Burestenen, a Swedish runestone
- A Swedish family name, see Bure kinship
  - Johannes Bureus or Johan Bure, a Swedish 17th century polymath
- Candace Cameron Bure (born 1976), American actress, producer, author and talk show panelist
- Pavel Bure (born 1971), Russian hockey player
- Valeri Bure (born 1974), Russian hockey player, brother of Pavel
- Vladimir Bure (1950–1924), Soviet swimmer, father of Pavel and Valeri Bure

== See also ==
- Burre
