= List of people from Helsinki =

Coat of arms of Helsinki

The following are notable people who were either born, raised or have lived for a significant period of time in the city of Helsinki, Finland.

== Academics and scientists ==
- Lars Ahlfors (1907–1996), mathematician, Fields Medalist
- Kai Donner (1888–1935), linguist, anthropologist & politician
- Peter Forsskål (1732–1763), Swedish-Finnish naturalist & orientalist
- Ragnar Granit (1900–1991), Finnish-Swedish neurophysiologist, Nobel laureate in Physiology or Medicine (1967)
- Elina Haavio-Mannila (born 1933), social scientist & professor
- Bengt Holmström (born 1949), Professor of Economics at MIT, Nobel laureate in Economics (2016)
- Olli Lehto (1925–2020), mathematician
- Rolf Nevanlinna (1895–1980), mathematician, university teacher & writer
- Gunnar Nordström (1881–1923), theoretical physicist
- Jakob Sederholm (1863–1934), petrologist
- Artturi Ilmari Virtanen (1895–1973), chemist, Nobel laureate in Chemistry (1945)
- Marianne Kärrholm (1921–2018), Swedish chemical engineer and professor
- Ulla Vuorela (1945–2011), professor of social anthropology

== Artists and designers ==
=== Architects ===
- Axel Hampus Dalström (1829–1882), architect
- Carl Ludvig Engel (1778–1840), German architect
- Juha Leiviskä (born 1936), architect

=== Fiber art, textiles, and design ===
- Kirsti Ilvessalo (1920–2019), textile artist
- Tom Ahlström (born 1943), industrial designer

== Entrepreneurs ==
- Karl Fazer (1866–1932), baker, confectioner, chocolatier, entrepreneur, & sport shooter
- Peter Nygård (born 1941), Finnish-Canadian businessman, arrested in December 2020 for sex crimes
- Armi Ratia (1912–1979), textile designer & co-founder of Marimekko
- Linus Torvalds (born 1969), software engineer, creator of Linux

== Clergy ==
- Lennart Koskinen (born 1944), Evangelical Lutheran Bishop of Visby (2003–2011)
- Samuel Lehtonen (1921–2010), Evangelical Lutheran Bishop of Helsinki (1982–1991)

== Filmmakers ==
- Aki Kaurismäki (born 1957), film director, screenwriter & producer
- Erkki Karu (1887–1935), film director & producer
- Gustaf Molander (1888–1973), Swedish director & screenwriter
- Diana Ringo (born 1992), film director & composer
- Mauritz Stiller (1883–1928), Russian-Swedish director & screenwriter

== Musicians ==
- Paavo Berglund (1929–2012), conductor
- Laci Boldemann (1921–1969), composer
- Reino Helismaa (1913–1965), writer, film actor & singer
- Tuomas Holopainen (born 1976), songwriter, multi-instrumentalist & record producer
- Lill Lindfors (born 1940), Finnish-Swedish singer & television presenter
- Magnus Lindberg (born 1958), composer & pianist
- Georg Malmstén (1902–1981), singer, musician, composer, orchestra director & actor
- Tauno Marttinen (1912–2008), composer
- Oskar Merikanto (1868–1924), composer
- Jari Mäenpää (born 1977), founder, former lead guitarist & current lead singer in melodic death metal band Wintersun, former lead singer & guitarist of folk metal band Ensiferum
- Klaus Mäkelä (born 1996), cellist & conductor
- Susanna Mälkki (born 1969), conductor
- Sakari Oramo (born 1965), principal conductor of BBC Symphony Orchestra
- Einojuhani Rautavaara (1928–2016), composer
- Kaija Saariaho (born 1952), composer
- Esa-Pekka Salonen (born 1958), composer, principal conductor of Philharmonia Orchestra (2008–2021)
- Heikki Sarmanto (born 1939), jazz pianist & composer
- Agnes Tschetschulin (1859–1942), composer & violinist
- Ville Valo (born 1976), lead singer of the rock band HIM
- Lauri Ylönen (born 1979), lead singer of the rock band The Rasmus
- Alexi Laiho (1979-2020), Founding member, lead vocalist & lead guitarist of Finnish Melodic Death Metal band Children of Bodom
- Käärijä (born 1993), singer

== Entertainment ==
- George Gaynes (1917–2016), American actor & singer
- Maggie Gripenberg (1881–1976), dancer
- Ella Eronen (1900-1987), actor
- Vesa-Matti Loiri (1945–2022), actor, comedian, singer
- Markku Peltola (1956–2007), actor & musician
- Anne Pohtamo (born 1955), beauty queen, Miss Suomi 1975, Miss Universe 1975
- Asko Sarkola (born 1945), actor

== Political and military figures ==
- Tarja Cronberg (born 1943), politician
- Tarja Halonen (born 1943), President of Finland (2000–2012)
- Johan Helo (1889–1966), lawyer & politician
- Abdirahim Hussein Mohamed (born 1978), Finnish-Somalian media personality & politician
- Yrjö Leino (1897–1961), communist politician, Minister of the Interior (1946–1948)
- Carl Gustaf Emil Mannerheim (1867–1951), statesman and Marshal of Finland
- Elisabeth Rehn (born 1935), Minister of Defence (1990–1995)
- Alexander Stubb (born 1968), Prime Minister of Finland (2014–2015)
- Väinö Tanner (1881–1966), Prime Minister of Finland (1926–1927)
- Toivo Wiherheimo (1898–1970), economist & politician
- Karl Wiik (1883–1946), Social Democratic politician

== Sports people ==
- Sanni Ahola (born 2000), ice hockey goaltender, member of the Finnish women's national ice hockey team
- Nina Ehrnrooth (born 1962), alpine skier
- Kai Hietarinta (born 1932), oil industry businessman and ice hockey executive
- Kim Hirschovits (born 1982), ice hockey player
- Shawn Huff, basketball player
- Walter Jakobsson (1882–1957), figure-skater
- Petteri Koponen, basketball player
- Emil Lindh (1867–1937), sailor
- Lennart Lindroos (1886–?), swimmer, Olympic games 1912
- Hanno Möttölä, basketball player
- Miron Ruina (born 1998), Finnish-Israeli basketball player
- Riitta Salin (born 1950), athlete
- Sasu Salin (born 1991), basketball player
- Teemu Selänne (born 1970), Hall of Fame ice hockey player
- Sebastian Aho (born 1997), Stanley Cup champion with the 2026 Carolina Hurricanes ice hockey player

== Writers ==
- Helena Anhava (1925-2018), poet, author & translator
- Irja Agnes Browallius (1901–1968), Swedish writer
- Bo Carpelan (1926–2011), Finnish-Swedish writer, literary critic & translator
- Elmer Diktonius (1896–1961), Finnish-Swedish writer & composer
- Tove Jansson (1914–2001), Finnish-Swedish writer, painter, cartoonist, author of “Moomins”
- Helinä Rautavaara (1929–1998), travel writer, collector, museum founder
- Märta Tikkanen (born 1935), Finnish-Swedish writer
- Sirkka Turkka (1939–2021), poet
- Mika Waltari (1908–1979), writer

== Others ==
- Minna Craucher (1891–1932), socialite & spy
- Liisa Hallamaa (1925–2008), Finnish ceramist
- Elin Törnudd (1924– 2008), Finnish chief librarian & professor
