= Anders Hackzell =

Anders Mårtensson Hackzell (1705, in Nederluleå, Norrbotten, Sweden - February 13, 1757, Alatornio, Lapland, Finland) worked as the chief enforcement officer (Swedish: kronofogde) and a cartographer and a mapper (Swedish: lantmätare) for the Swedish crown.

== Childhood ==
In 1705, Anders was born in Nederluleå, Norrbotten, Sweden. Anders was one of the seven children – six sons and a daughter – born to Mårten Andersson Hackzell (1674–1725) from Holm in Uppland, Sweden, and Anna Nilsdotter Plantin (1663–1741) from Gammelstad in Luleå, Sweden.

The father of Anders Hackzell, Mårten, worked as a commander and the chief enforcement officer (Swedish: kronofogde) for the Swedish crown. Mårten was the only child of the Uppland clergyman Andreas Hackzelius (1630-1681) and Brita Mårtensdotter Hörling (1649–1710) from Stockholm, in Uppland.

== Marriage and career ==
Anders married to Anna Catharina Plantin (1728–1807) from Lövånger, Västerbotten, Sweden. The couple had five children, of which three were sons (one died at birth) and two were daughters.

Following in the footsteps of his father Mårten, Andreas chose to work in the service of the Swedish crown. Andreas became the chief enforcement officer (Swedish: kronofogde) for the Swedish crown and a cartographer and a mapper (Swedish: lantmätare). Among his accomplishments in cartography, Anders Hackzell mapped the area of Kiruna, Sweden, in 1736. Anders gave the mountains of the area the Swedish language names Fredriks berg (Finnish: Kiirunavaara) and Berget Ulrika Eleonora (Finnish: Luossavaara), after the King of Sweden Fredrik I and his wife Ulrika Eleonora.

Anders died two weeks before the sixth birthday of his eldest son, Zacharias Hackzell (1751-1804). Like his grandfather Mårten and father Anders, Zacharias too landed in a career in service of the Swedish crown. Zacharias became the chief of police (Swedish: kronolänsman) for the Swedish crown in Tornio, Finland.

== See also ==
- Burestenen
- Genealogia Sursilliana

== Sources ==
- Slott och herresäten i Sverige – Uppland (II).
- Svenska män och kvinnor – by Bonniers förlag, 1954.
- Svensk uppslagsbok – a Swedish encyclopedia published between 1929 and 1955 in two editions.
- Det medeltida Sverige 1:6 ("The Medieval Sweden").
- Vapenbok ("Book of Coats of Arm") by passagen.se.
