= 2016 FIBA U18 European Championship =

International basketball competition

33rd FIBA Under-18 European Basketball Championship

Tournament details
- Host country: Turkey
- Dates: 16 – 22 December 2016
- Teams: 16
- Venue: 2 (in 1 host city)

Final positions
- Champions: France (4th title)

Tournament statistics
- MVP: (France) Frank Ntilikina
- Top scorer: (Bosnia and Herzegovina) Džanan Musa (20.2)
- Top rebounds: (Latvia) Artūrs Strautiņš (10.3)
- Top assists: (Lithuania) Arnas Velička (5.7)
- PPG (Team): Israel (82.8)
- RPG (Team): Lithuania (46.7)
- APG (Team): Italy (18.5)

Official website
- www.fiba.basketball

The 2016 FIBA U18 European Championship was the 33rd edition of the FIBA U18 European Championship. The competition was originally scheduled to take place in Samsun, Turkey, from 30 July to 7 August 2016, but was postponed indefinitely due to the political unrest in the country at the time. On 30 September 2016, FIBA decided that the tournament would take place from 16 to 22 December 2016. The top five teams qualified for the 2017 FIBA Under-19 World Championship.

France won their fourth title in this event by beating Lithuania in the final, 75–68.

== Participating teams ==
- Bosnia and Herzegovina
- Croatia
- Finland
- France
- Germany
- Greece
- Israel ▲ (Runners-up, 2015 FIBA Europe Under-18 Championship Division B)
- Italy
- Latvia
- Lithuania
- Russia
- Serbia
- Slovenia ▲ (Third place, 2015 FIBA Europe Under-18 Championship Division B)
- Spain
- Sweden ▲ (Winners, 2015 FIBA Europe Under-18 Championship Division B)
- Turkey

== First round ==
In this round, the 16 teams are allocated in four groups of four teams each. The top two teams from each group will advance to the Quarterfinals. The bottom two teams from each group will play classification games for 9th to 16th spot.

=== Group A ===
Pos	Team	Pld	W	L	PF	PA	PD	Pts	Qualification
1	Italy	3	3	0	227	196	+31	6	Advance to Quarterfinals
2	Spain	3	2	1	194	178	+16	5	Advance to Quarterfinals
3	Croatia	3	1	2	218	235	−17	4	Classification round
4	Sweden	3	0	3	181	211	−30	3	Classification round

Source: FIBA
Rules for classification: 1) Points; 2) Head-to-head results; 3) Points difference; 4) Points scored.

16 December 2016
14:00

Report

Spain	74–62	Croatia
Scoring by quarter: 17–16, 12–13, 15–15, 30–18
Pts: Font 21; Rebs: Martínez 9 Asts: Figueras 6		Pts: Uljarevic 14; Rebs: Bajo, Cizmic 10; Asts: Cizmic 6

Mustafa Dağıstanlı Arena, Samsun

16 December 2016
16:15

Report

Italy	75–56	Sweden
Scoring by quarter: 16–13, 20–20, 17–13, 22–10
Pts: Moretti 13; Rebs: Lever 8 Asts: Moretti 6		Pts: Lundqvist 15; Rebs: three players 5 Asts: Lemetti, Lundqvist 3

Mustafa Dağıstanlı Arena, Samsun

17 December 2016
14:00

Report

Sweden	48–58	Spain
Scoring by quarter: 11–12, 11–18, 13–13, 13–15
Pts: Arvidsson, Lemetti 15; Rebs: Arvidsson, Larsson 6 Asts: Arvidsson, Lundqvist 2		Pts: Font 16; Rebs: Martínez 12; Asts: Ballespin, Garcia 3

Canik Atatürk Sports Hall, Samsun

17 December 2016
20:45

Report

Croatia	78–84	Italy
Scoring by quarter: 17–20, 10–21, 22–23, 29–20
Pts: Bajo, Cizmic 14; Rebs: Bajo 9 Asts: Mandic 3		Pts: Moretti 23; Rebs: Oxilia 5 Asts: three players 4

Mustafa Dağıstanlı Arena, Samsun

18 December 2016
16:15

Report

Sweden	77–78	Croatia
Scoring by quarter: 20–24, 19–13, 22–12, 16–29
Pts: Lundqvist 27; Rebs: three players 4 Asts: Lundqvist 6		Pts: Paic, Saric 15; Rebs: Buljevic 6 Asts: Uljarevic 7

Canik Atatürk Sports Hall, Samsun

18 December 2016
20:45

Report

Spain	62–68	Italy
Scoring by quarter: 13–21, 11–19, 11–10, 27–18
Pts: Martinez 19; Rebs: Martinez 8 Asts: Figueras 5		Pts: Oxilia 15; Rebs: Oxilia 10; Asts: Moretti 4

Canik Atatürk Sports Hall, Samsun

=== Group B ===
Pos	Team	Pld	W	L	PF	PA	PD	Pts	Qualification
1	Germany	3	3	0	257	203	+54	6	Advance to Quarterfinals
2	Finland	3	1	2	199	218	−19	4 (Note: Finland 1–1, +10; Greece 1–1, −2; Turkey 1–1, −8)	Advance to Quarterfinals
3	Greece	3	1	2	221	238	−17	4	Classification round
4	Turkey	3	1	2	205	223	−18	4	Classification round

Source: FIBA
Rules for classification: 1) Points; 2) Head-to-head results; 3) Points difference; 4) Points scored.
Notes:

16 December 2016
18:30

Report

Turkey	82–78	Greece
Scoring by quarter: 23–19, 23–15, 14–17, 22–27
Pts: Al 21; Rebs: Bastan, Senel 5 Asts: Al 8		Pts: Lountzis 18; Rebs: Moraitis 8 Asts: Moraitis 7

Mustafa Dağıstanlı Arena, Samsun

16 December 2016
20:45

Report

Germany	92–63	Finland
Scoring by quarter: 21–16, 26–12, 23–18, 22–17
Pts: Mushidi 18; Rebs: Da Silva 6 Asts: Mushidi 6		Pts: Maxhuni 13; Rebs: Polla 5 Asts: Maxhuni 3

Mustafa Dağıstanlı Arena, Samsun

17 December 2016
18:30

Report

Finland	65–53	Turkey
Scoring by quarter: 22–15, 16–14, 12–16, 15–8
Pts: Maxhuni 20; Rebs: Polla 13; Asts: Knihtinen, Maxhuni 3		Pts: Al, Duran 10; Rebs: Duran, Saybir 8 Asts: Al 5

Mustafa Dağıstanlı Arena, Samsun

17 December 2016
20:45

Report

Greece	70–85	Germany
Scoring by quarter: 18–19, 21–16, 22–26, 9–24
Pts: Lountzis 14; Rebs: Moraitis 4 Asts: Moraitis 6		Pts: Weidemann 15; Rebs: Olinde 9 Asts: four players 3

Canik Atatürk Sports Hall, Samsun

18 December 2016
18:30

Report

Turkey	70–80	Germany
Scoring by quarter: 12–23, 22–14, 16–21, 20–22
Pts: Atar 21; Rebs: Atar 15; Asts: Al 7		Pts: Hartenstein 19; Rebs: Hartenstein 13; Asts: Zylka 4

Mustafa Dağıstanlı Arena, Samsun

18 December 2016
18:30

Report

Finland	71–73	Greece
Scoring by quarter: 11–17, 14–25, 21–18, 25–13
Pts: Maxhuni 18; Rebs: Polla 12; Asts: Maxhuni 4		Pts: Lountzis 19; Rebs: Christidis 9 Asts: three players 3

Canik Atatürk Sports Hall, Samsun

=== Group C ===
Pos	Team	Pld	W	L	PF	PA	PD	Pts	Qualification
1	Lithuania	3	2	1	226	217	+9	5 (Note: Lithuania 1–1, +3; Bosnia and Herzegovina 1–1, ±0; Latvia 1–1, −3)	Advance to Quarterfinals
2	Bosnia and Herzegovina	3	2	1	247	246	+1	5	Advance to Quarterfinals
3	Latvia	3	2	1	195	197	−2	5	Classification round
4	Israel	3	0	3	260	268	−8	3	Classification round

Source: FIBA
Rules for classification: 1) Points; 2) Head-to-head results; 3) Points difference; 4) Points scored.
Notes:

16 December 2016
14:00

Report

Bosnia and Herzegovina	103–102 (OT)	Israel
Scoring by quarter: 16–24, 16–25, 23–17, 35–24, Overtime: 13–12
Pts: Musa 24; Rebs: Maric 12; Asts: Gegic 11		Pts: Ebo 30; Rebs: Zoosman 8 Asts: Zoosman 7

Canik Atatürk Sports Hall, Samsun

16 December 2016
16:15

Report

Latvia	50–62	Lithuania
Scoring by quarter: 15–19, 12–10, 12–16, 11–17
Pts: Zoriks 16; Rebs: Blumbergs 12; Asts: Garoza, Zoriks 2		Pts: Sedekerskis 14; Rebs: Masiulis 10; Asts: Velička 4

Canik Atatürk Sports Hall, Samsun

17 December 2016
14:00

Report

Lithuania	70–79	Bosnia and Herzegovina
Scoring by quarter: 15–19, 17–19, 20–16, 18–25
Pts: Sedekerskis 25; Rebs: Sedekerskis 12; Asts: Sedekerskis 5		Pts: Talic 19; Rebs: Cerkezovic 10; Asts: three players 2

Mustafa Dağıstanlı Arena, Samsun

17 December 2016
16:15

Report

Israel	70–71	Latvia
Scoring by quarter: 13–13, 13–18, 22–21, 22–19
Pts: Moshkovitz, Ruina 14; Rebs: Moshkovitz 12; Asts: Rabinowitz 4		Pts: Strautiņš 24; Rebs: Strautiņš 12; Asts: Garoza 4

Mustafa Dağıstanlı Arena, Samsun

18 December 2016
14:00

Report

Israel	88–94 (OT)	Lithuania
Scoring by quarter: 18–18, 18–16, 26–14, 14–28, Overtime: 12–18
Pts: Zoosman 17; Rebs: Zoosman 17; Asts: three players 3		Pts: Kulboka 25; Rebs: Sedekerskis 15; Asts: Sedekerskis, Velička 6

Canik Atatürk Sports Hall, Samsun

18 December 2016
20:45

Report

Latvia	74–65	Bosnia and Herzegovina
Scoring by quarter: 29–13, 11–20, 8–19, 26–13
Pts: Blumbergs, Strautiņš 18; Rebs: Blumbergs 9 Asts: Zoriks 5		Pts: Musa 20; Rebs: Musa 9 Asts: Gegic 3

Mustafa Dağıstanlı Arena, Samsun

=== Group D ===
Pos	Team	Pld	W	L	PF	PA	PD	Pts	Qualification
1	France	3	3	0	205	166	+39	6	Advance to Quarterfinals
2	Russia	3	2	1	199	145	+54	5	Advance to Quarterfinals
3	Serbia	3	1	2	179	201	−22	4	Classification round
4	Slovenia	3	0	3	159	230	−71	3	Classification round

Source: FIBA
Rules for classification: 1) Points; 2) Head-to-head results; 3) Points difference; 4) Points scored.

16 December 2016
18:30

Report

France	53–48	Russia
Scoring by quarter: 16–11, 16–9, 12–15, 9–13
Pts: Mokoka, Ntilikina 8 Rebs: Doumbouya 10; Asts: three players 3		Pts: Tonoyan 18; Rebs: three players 7 Asts: Motovilov, Klyuev 3

Canik Atatürk Sports Hall, Samsun

16 December 2016
20:45

Report

Serbia	68–60	Slovenia
Scoring by quarter: 13–18, 19–13, 15–14, 21–15
Pts: Radanov 23; Rebs: Simanic 13; Asts: Radanov 4		Pts: Ozegovic 14; Rebs: Ozegovic, Vesel 8 Asts: Bratec 3

Canik Atatürk Sports Hall, Samsun

17 December 2016
16:15

Report

Slovenia	50–81	France
Scoring by quarter: 10–26, 14–17, 9–18, 17–20
Pts: Janezic 9 Rebs: Šiška 5 Asts: Šiška 5		Pts: Doumbouya 22; Rebs: three players 6 Asts: Ntilikina 7

Canik Atatürk Sports Hall, Samsun

17 December 2016
18:30

Report

Russia	70–43	Serbia
Scoring by quarter: 16–8, 19–5, 21–10, 14–20
Pts: Tonoyan 16; Rebs: Tonoyan 12; Asts: Tonoyan 4		Pts: Music 12; Rebs: Stefan Đorđević, Music 6 Asts: Miskovic, Music 2

Canik Atatürk Sports Hall, Samsun

18 December 2016
14:00

Report

Slovenia	49–81	Russia
Scoring by quarter: 17–18, 16–15, 11–25, 5–23
Pts: three players 10; Rebs: Vesel 11; Asts: Bratec 4		Pts: Tonoyan 21; Rebs: Andrianov 11; Asts: Motovilov 7

Mustafa Dağıstanlı Arena, Samsun

18 December 2016
16:15

Report

France	71–68	Serbia
Scoring by quarter: 16–15, 13–19, 20–18, 22–16
Pts: Doumbouya 31; Rebs: Diawara, Mokoka 5 Asts: Mokoka 5		Pts: Simanic 14; Rebs: Simovic 11; Asts: Đorđević, Radanov 3

Mustafa Dağıstanlı Arena, Samsun

== Classification round ==
=== 9th–16th place classification ===
13th place game (22 December)
Latvia	90
Croatia	76
15th place game
Sweden	66
Israel	90

13th–16th place semifinals (21 December)
Sweden	82
Latvia	91
Croatia	87
Israel	84

9th–16th place quarterfinals (20 December)
Greece	80
Sweden	69
Latvia	70
Slovenia	86
Croatia	69
Turkey	71
Serbia	69
Israel	63

9th–12th place semifinals (21 December)
Greece	70
Slovenia	68
Turkey	58
Serbia	73

Ninth place game (22 December)
Greece	74
Serbia	67
Eleventh place game
Slovenia	71
Turkey	63

==== 9th–16th place quarterfinals ====
20 December 2016
14:00

Report

Latvia	70–86	Slovenia
Scoring by quarter: 23–19, 19–19, 9–21, 19–27
Pts: Strautiņš 19; Rebs: Strautiņš 12; Asts: Jansons, Zoriks 2		Pts: Bratec, Ozegovic 17; Rebs: Skedelj 11; Asts: Bratec 4

Canik Atatürk Sports Hall, Samsun

20 December 2016
16:15

Report

Greece	80–69	Sweden
Scoring by quarter: 12–19, 21–17, 20–14, 27–19
Pts: Christidis 20; Rebs: Christidis 8 Asts: Lountzis 5		Pts: Arvidsson 17; Rebs: Larsson 6 Asts: Larsson 5

Canik Atatürk Sports Hall, Samsun

20 December 2016
18:30

Report

Croatia	69–71	Turkey
Scoring by quarter: 15–30, 12–14, 22–13, 20–14
Pts: Uljarevic 15; Rebs: Uljarevic 9 Asts: Uljarevic 8		Pts: Atar 18; Rebs: Atar 14; Asts: Yarol 7

Canik Atatürk Sports Hall, Samsun

20 December 2016
20:45

Report

Serbia	69–63	Israel
Scoring by quarter: 17–12, 13–18, 18–18, 21–15
Pts: Glisic 20; Rebs: Stefan Đorđević 8 Asts: Uskokovic 5		Pts: Zoosman 14; Rebs: Moshkovitz, Zoosman 8 Asts: Zoosman 4

Canik Atatürk Sports Hall, Samsun

==== 13th–16th place semifinals ====
21 December 2016
14:00

Report

Sweden	82–91	Latvia
Scoring by quarter: 25–27, 21–20, 20–20, 16–24
Pts: Lemetti 25; Rebs: three players 4 Asts: Lundqvist 5		Pts: Blumbergs 25; Rebs: Strautiņš 11; Asts: Strautiņš, Zoriks 9

Canik Atatürk Sports Hall, Samsun

21 December 2016
16:15

Report

Croatia	87–84	Israel
Scoring by quarter: 21–21, 29–21, 18–23, 19–19
Pts: Barnjak 20; Rebs: three players 6 Asts: four players 5		Pts: three players 14; Rebs: Zoosman 7 Asts: Beni, Moshkovitz 3

Canik Atatürk Sports Hall, Samsun

==== 9th–12th place semifinals ====
21 December 2016
18:30

Report

Turkey	58–73	Serbia
Scoring by quarter: 13–19, 13–17, 14–20, 18–17
Pts: Atar 20; Rebs: Saybir 8 Asts: Akyuz, Al 3		Pts: Momirov 15; Rebs: Glisic 15; Asts: Music 8

Canik Atatürk Sports Hall, Samsun

21 December 2016
20:45

Report

Greece	70–68	Slovenia
Scoring by quarter: 20–9, 14–16, 18–27, 18–16
Pts: Kalaitzakis 13; Rebs: Lountzis 9 Asts: Lountzis 6		Pts: Ozegovic 17; Rebs: Ozegovic 10; Asts: Ozegovic 5

Canik Atatürk Sports Hall, Samsun

==== 15th place game ====
22 December 2016
11:45

Report

Sweden	66–90	Israel
Scoring by quarter: 15–23, 24–18, 16–24, 11–25
Pts: Zekovic 16; Rebs: three players 4 Asts: Larsson 4		Pts: Ruina 23; Rebs: Ruina, Zoosman 9 Asts: Rabinowitz, Moshkovitz 6

Canik Atatürk Sports Hall, Samsun

==== 13th place game ====
22 December 2016
14:00

Report

Latvia	90–76	Croatia
Scoring by quarter: 22–25, 24–14, 25–12, 19–25
Pts: Blumbergs 23; Rebs: Blumbergs 13; Asts: Zoriks 10		Pts: Cizmic 18; Rebs: Buljevic, Paic 6 Asts: Uljarevic 7

Canik Atatürk Sports Hall, Samsun

==== Eleventh place game ====
22 December 2016
16:15

Report

Slovenia	71–63	Turkey
Scoring by quarter: 17–18, 16–8, 19–16, 19–21
Pts: Bratec 15; Rebs: Vesel 13; Asts: Bratec 6		Pts: Akyuz, Saybir 14; Rebs: Dogan 12; Asts: Akyuz, Saybir 4

Canik Atatürk Sports Hall, Samsun

==== Ninth place game ====
22 December 2016
18:30

Report

Greece	74–67	Serbia
Scoring by quarter: 18–20, 18–23, 19–10, 19–14
Pts: Lountzis 19; Rebs: Lountzis 10; Asts: Moraitis 6		Pts: Radanov 18; Rebs: Glisic 8 Asts: Music 6

Canik Atatürk Sports Hall, Samsun

=== 5th–8th place classification ===
5th–8th place semifinals
21 December
Spain	70
Russia	55
21 December
Finland	72
Bosnia and Herzegovina	95

Fifth place
22 December
Spain	77
Bosnia and Herzegovina	65
Seventh place
22 December
Russia	82
Finland	67

==== 5th–8th place semifinals ====
21 December 2016
14:00

Report

Spain	70–55	Russia
Scoring by quarter: 24–17, 20–16, 9–11, 17–11
Pts: Martínez 24; Rebs: Martínez 14; Asts: Font, Garcia 6		Pts: Lopatin 13; Rebs: Klyuev, Sharapov 7 Asts: Motovilov 5

Mustafa Dağıstanlı Arena, Samsun

21 December 2016
16:15

Report

Finland	72–95	Bosnia and Herzegovina
Scoring by quarter: 19–22, 12–23, 20–22, 21–28
Pts: Maxhuni 18; Rebs: Polla 9 Asts: Valtonen 5		Pts: Musa 28; Rebs: Cerkezovic, Maric 8 Asts: Musa 7

Mustafa Dağıstanlı Arena, Samsun

==== Seventh place game ====
22 December 2016
14:00

Report

Russia	82–67	Finland
Scoring by quarter: 19–13, 12–19, 24–15, 27–20
Pts: Motovilov 21; Rebs: Klyuev, Kuzmin 6 Asts: Tonoyan 7		Pts: Maxhuni 18; Rebs: Polla 12; Asts: Valtonen 4

Mustafa Dağıstanlı Arena, Samsun

==== Fifth place game ====
22 December 2016
16:15

Report

Spain	77–65	Bosnia and Herzegovina
Scoring by quarter: 21–16, 17–18, 15–15, 24–16
Pts: Rosa 27; Rebs: Martínez 11; Asts: Figueras 8		Pts: Talic 14; Rebs: Musa 8 Asts: Talic 6

Mustafa Dağıstanlı Arena, Samsun

== Final round ==
Quarterfinals
20 December
Germany	78
Spain	74
20 December
Lithuania	82
Russia	81
20 December
Italy	61
Finland	56
20 December
France	75
Bosnia and Herzegovina	61

Semifinals
21 December
Germany	62
Lithuania	69
21 December
Italy	72
France	82

Final
22 December
Lithuania	68
France	75
Third place
22 December
Germany	68
Italy	74

=== Quarterfinals ===
20 December 2016
14:00

Report

Germany	78–74	Spain
Scoring by quarter: 9–15, 29–18, 19–18, 21–23
Pts: De Silva 17; Rebs: Hartenstein 13; Asts: five players 2		Pts: Font 23; Rebs: Rosa 4 Asts: Figueras 8

Mustafa Dağıstanlı Arena, Samsun

20 December 2016
16:15

Report

Lithuania	82–81	Russia
Scoring by quarter: 15–13, 23–19, 25–19, 19–30
Pts: Masiulis 23; Rebs: Masiulis 13; Asts: Velička 7		Pts: Motovilov 27; Rebs: Tonoyan 8 Asts: Motovilov 4

Mustafa Dağıstanlı Arena, Samsun

20 December 2016
18:30

Report

Italy	61–56	Finland
Scoring by quarter: 16–15, 11–12, 21–13, 13–16
Pts: Moretti 14; Rebs: Lever 9 Asts: Baldasso 6		Pts: Maxhuni 20; Rebs: Maxhuni, Polla 7 Asts: Kaukiainen 4

Mustafa Dağıstanlı Arena, Samsun

20 December 2016
20:45

Report

France	75–61	Bosnia and Herzegovina
Scoring by quarter: 19–14, 14–15, 17–16, 25–16
Pts: Doumbouya 19; Rebs: Doumbouya, Mokoka 11; Asts: Mokoka 5		Pts: Musa 19; Rebs: Gegic 9 Asts: Gegic 9

Mustafa Dağıstanlı Arena, Samsun

=== Semifinals ===
21 December 2016
18:30

Report

Germany	62–69	Lithuania
Scoring by quarter: 16–19, 14–12, 15–20, 17–18
Pts: Mushidi 33; Rebs: three players 8 Asts: three players 3		Pts: Kulboka 24; Rebs: Kulboka, Masiulis 9 Asts: Velička 6

Mustafa Dağıstanlı Arena, Samsun

21 December 2016
20:45

Report

Italy	72–82	France
Scoring by quarter: 19–18, 12–28, 17–10, 24–26
Pts: Lever 25; Rebs: Oxilia 7 Asts: Moretti 9		Pts: Ntilikina 23; Rebs: Mokoka 7 Asts: Ntilikina 9

Mustafa Dağıstanlı Arena, Samsun

=== Third place game ===
22 December 2016
18:30

Report

Germany	68–74	Italy
Scoring by quarter: 12–14, 17–22, 11–19, 28–19
Pts: Hartenstein 24; Rebs: Hartenstein 7 Asts: Mushidi 6		Pts: Lever 18; Rebs: Lever, Oxilia 7 Asts: Moretti, Penna 6

Mustafa Dağıstanlı Arena, Samsun

=== Final ===
22 December 2016
20:45

Report

Lithuania	68–75	France
Scoring by quarter: 12–20, 16–16, 22–17, 18–22
Pts: Kulboka 28; Rebs: Sedekerskis 12; Asts: Velička 8		Pts: Ntilikina 31; Rebs: Vautier 13; Asts: N'Doye, Ntilikina 3

Mustafa Dağıstanlı Arena, Samsun
Referees: Andris Aunkrogers (LAT), Georgios Poursanidis (GRE), Milan Nedovič (SLO)

== Final standings ==
Rank	Team	Record
Gold medal	France	6–0
Silver medal	Lithuania	4–2
Bronze medal	Italy	5–1
4th	Germany	4–2
5th	Spain	4–2
6th	Bosnia and Herzegovina	3–3
7th	Russia	3–3
8th	Finland	1–5
9th	Greece	4–2
10th	Serbia	3–3
11th	Slovenia	2–4
12th	Turkey	2–4
13th	Latvia	4–2
14th	Croatia	2–4
15th	Israel	1–5
16th	Sweden	0–6

Qualified for the 2017 FIBA Under-19 Basketball World Cup
Relegated to the 2017 FIBA U18 European Championship Division B

== Awards ==
2016 FIBA Europe
Under-18 Championship winner

France
Fourth title

Most Valuable Player
(France) Frank Ntilikina

All-Tournament Team

- PG – (Italy) Davide Moretti
- SG – (France) Frank Ntilikina (MVP)
- SF – (France) Sekou Doumbouya
- PF – (Lithuania) Tadas Sedekerskis
- C – (Germany) Isaiah Hartenstein
