= Zacharias Hackzell =

Zacharias Hackzell (March 1, 1751, in Tornio, Lapland, Finland – August 20, 1804, Finland) worked as the chief of police (Swedish: kronolänsman) for the Swedish crown in Tornio, Finland.

== Childhood ==
Zacharias Hackzell was one of the five children born to Anders Mårtensson Hackzell (1705–1757) and Anna Catharina Plantin (1663–1741), of which three were sons (one died at birth) and two were daughters.

His father Anders Hackzell worked as the chief enforcement officer (Swedish: kronofogde), a cartographer and a mapper (Swedish: lantmätare) for the Swedish crown. Anders Hackzell died on February 13, 1757, two weeks before his son's sixth birthday.

== Marriage and career ==
Hackzell married twice. Hackzell had two daughters with his first wife, Anna Margareta Grape: Greta who was born in 1779 and Anna Christina who was born in 1781. Anna Grape died at the age of 29 in 1785. Hackzell later married Agata Pipping (1766–1833), the daughter of the mayor of Tornio, Peter Pipping. Hackzell had at least three more children with his second wife: Sofia in 1787, Zackarias in 1791 and Olof in 1800.

Following in the footsteps of both his father Anders Hackzell and grandfather Mårten Hackzell, Zacharias Hackzell also chose to work for the Swedish crown. He became the chief of police (Swedish: kronolänsman) for the Swedish crown in Tornio, at the border of the modern-day countries of Sweden and Finland. At the time, Finland was still a part of the Realm of Sweden. Five years after the death of Hackzell in 1809, Finland became an autonomous Grand Duchy of Russia (1809–1917).

== See also ==
- Burestenen
- Genealogia Sursilliana

== Sources ==
- Slott och herresäten i Sverige – Uppland (II).
- Svenska män och kvinnor – by Bonniers förlag, 1954.
- Svensk uppslagsbok – a Swedish encyclopedia published between 1929 and 1955 in two editions.
- Det medeltida Sverige 1:6 ("The Medieval Sweden").
- Vapenbok ("Book of Coats of Arm") by passagen.se.
