= Church of Holm, Uppland =

Church in Uppland, Sweden

- Sweden
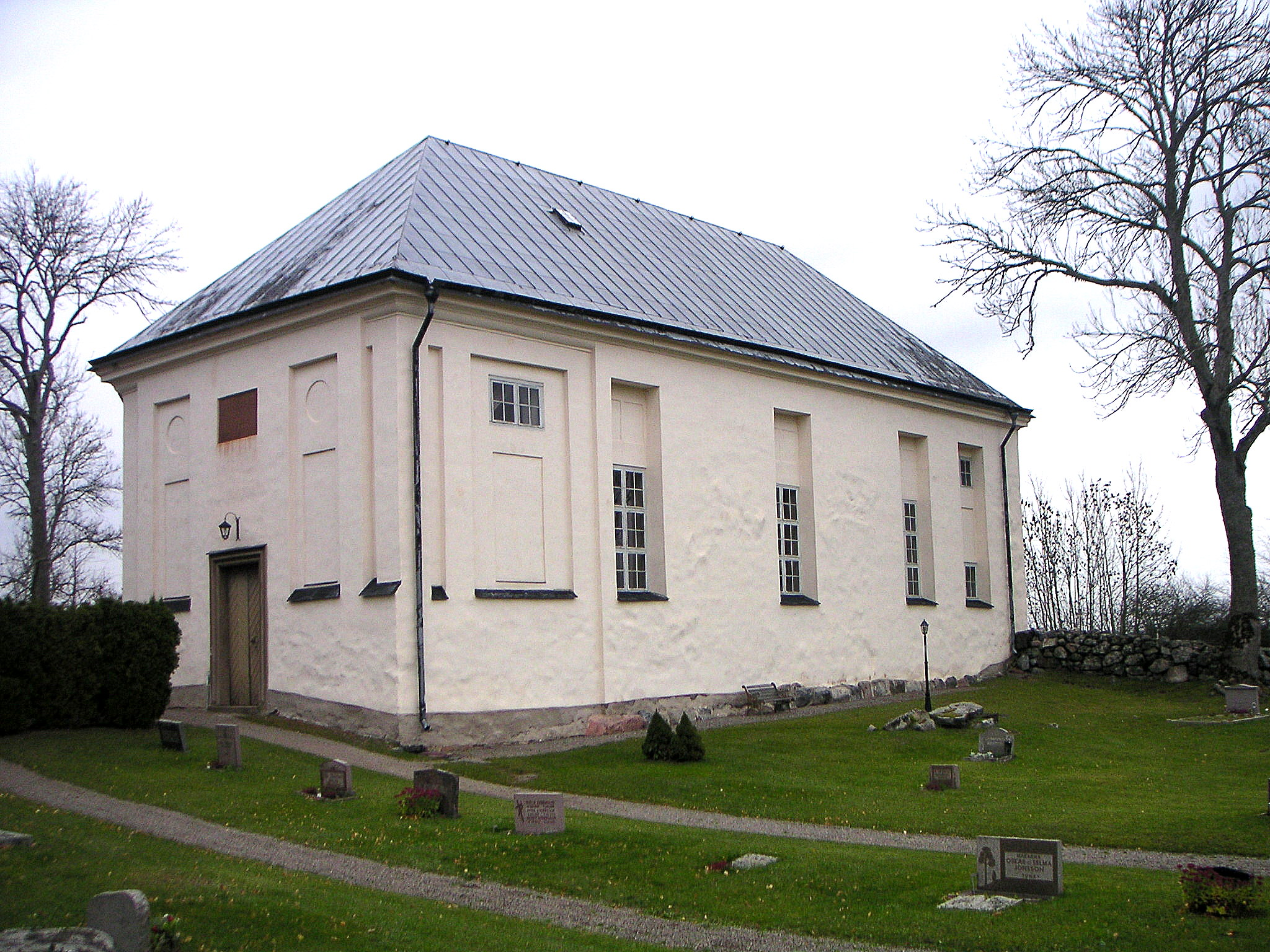

Site information
- Type: Church

Location
- Coordinates: 59°43′04″N 17°30′29″E

The Church of Holm is located in the Parish of Holm, between Lårstaviken and Gorran in Mälaren, 17 km north of Bålsta, in the Municipality of Enköping in Uppland, Sweden. Holm is probably the smallest parish in Sweden today, with a population of 26 residents enlisted in the year 2000.

The church was constructed in 1678 above the ruins of an earlier medieval church. From the start, the new church was closely connected with the nearby Sjöö Castle (modern spelling: Sjö), which was built during the decade between 1669 and 1769 by a patron (Latin: patrōnus) of the church, the Marshal of the Realm of Sweden Johan Gabriel Stenbock (1640-1705).

The first head of congregation working in the newly built church was the Rector (Swedish: "kyrkoherde") Andreas Hackzelius (1630-1681), who also headed the congregation of Kulla close by.

The 17th-century patronage of the Church of Holm consisted of high-ranking statesmen and royal and other high noble friends and family members of Johan Gabriel Stenbock who owned Sjöö Castle and was one of the most powerful people within the Realm of Sweden. In one 17th-century letter remaining to date, the Queen of Sweden Christina (1626-1689) compliments and thanks Rector Andreas Hackzelius for a church service and sermon given by him.

The church was built in Italian style. It has a rectangular plan and a ridge roof. The design work was done either by Nicodemus Tessin the Elder or Mathias Spieler, or possibly both. At the time, the two architects were on the grounds to lead the work on the Castle's construction.

Because the church has later burned twice, in 1723 and in 1822, basically only the stonewalls of the 17th-century church remain today. Otherwise, the present exterior of the church appearance is from the reconstruction work after the fire of 1822. The church decor is from the 1720s. A new sacristy for the church was designed in 1840. The church was repaired in 1950 when it was in poor condition, after having been used for many years as a granary.

Above the altar in the church is a pulpit and above the pulpit is a small organ from the 17th century - it was donated to the Church in 1752. Above the middle aisle of the church is a 16-arm chandelier from around 1700.

Today, the Church of Holm belongs to the Assembly of Lagunda in the Diocese of Uppsala.
