= Čizmić =

Čizmić is a Croatian surname. Notable people with the surname include:

- Leo Čizmić (born 1998), Israeli-born Croatian basketball player, son of Teo
- Teo Čizmić (born 1971), Croatian basketball player and coach
