= Uppland Runic Inscription 1028 =

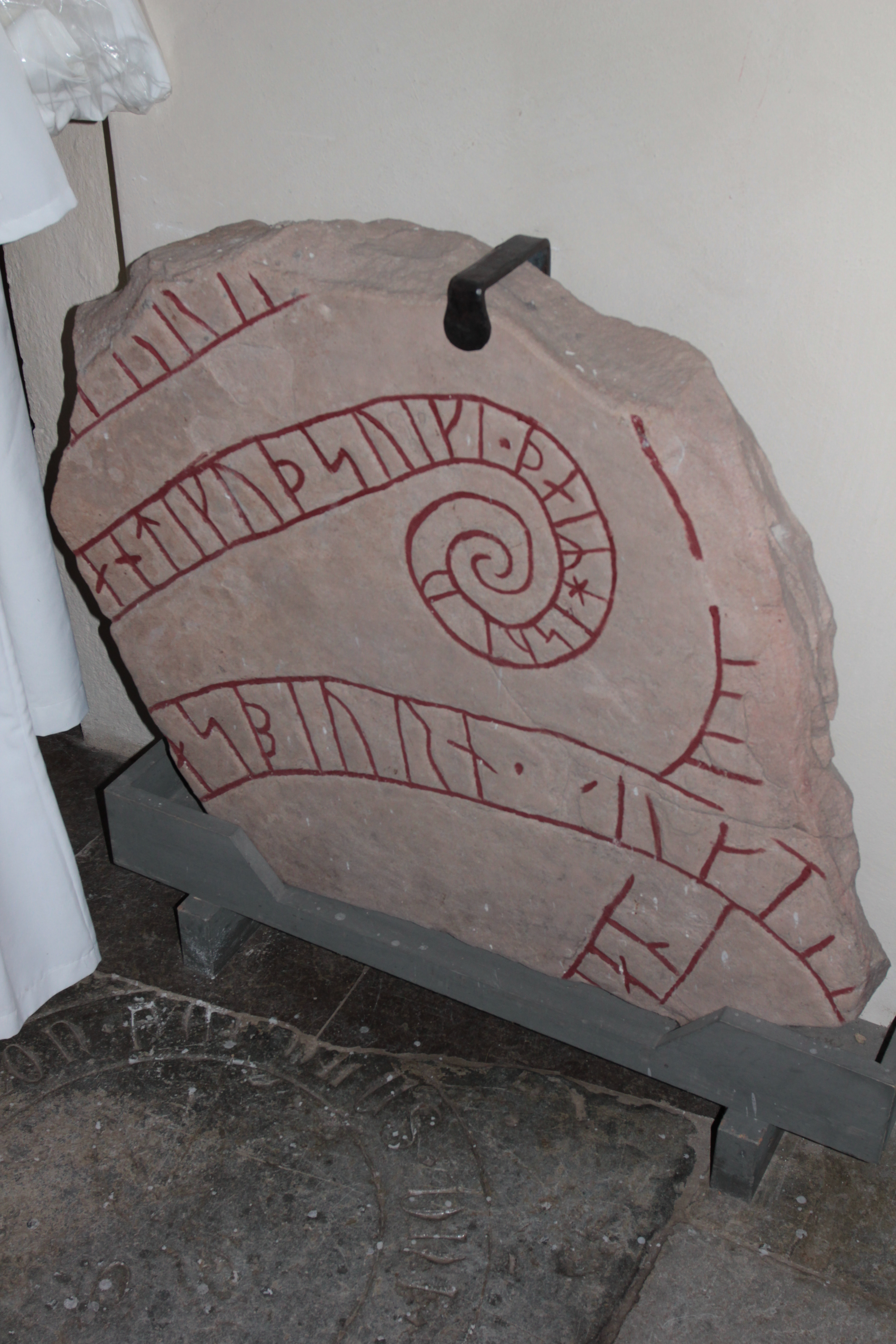

The Uppland Runic Inscription 1028 is a Viking Age runestone engraved in Old Norse with the Younger Futhark runic alphabet. It was found by Johannes Bureus outside the church door of Lena Church and it nowadays visible in the wall inside of the church porch. Lena Church is in Uppsala Municipality.

== Inscription ==
... asbiurn · (a)uk i[n]-... ... ...--[k](u)r(u)... ...---...na-... ...anti kuþ suiki · þa iʀ h[a] sui[k]u
... Asbiorn {} ok ... ... ... ... ...[l]andi(?). Guð sviki {} þa, eʀ hann sviku.
"... Ásbjôrn and ... ... ... ... ...-land(?) May God betray those who betrayed him."

== See also ==
- List of runestones
