= Mustafa Dağıstanlı Sports Hall =

Indoor sporting arena located in Turkey

- Mustafa Dağıstanlı Spor Salonu
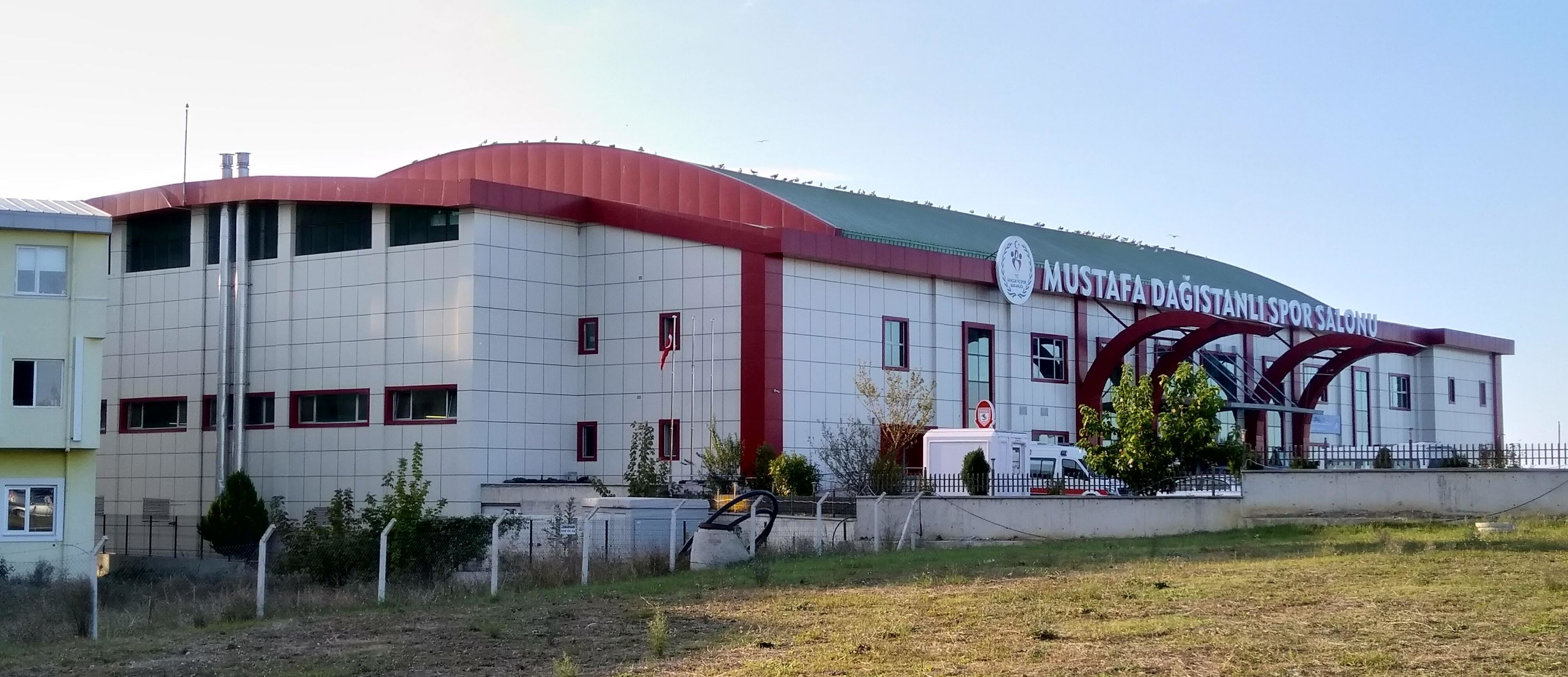
- Mustafa Dağıstanlı Sports Hall

- Location of the sports hall in Turkey.
- Address: Hançerli Mah., Atatürk Boulevard. 17, İlkadım
- Location: İlkadım, Samsun, Turkey
- Coordinates: 41°19′27″N 36°18′53″E
- Capacity: 2,000

Construction
- Groundbreaking: December 17, 2011
- Opened: June 2, 2013; 13 years ago

Tenants
- Samsunspor (basketball); 2016 European Boxing Olympic Qualification Tournament; 2016 FIBA Europe Under-18 Championship; 2017 Summer Deaflympics

Mustafa Dağıstanlı Sports Hall (Turkish: Mustafa Dağıstanlı Spor Salonu) is a multi-purpose indoor arena located in İlkadım district of Samsun Province, northern Turkey. It was named in honor of Mustafa Dağıstanlı (born 1931), a local sport wrestler, who became twice Olympic and three times world champion in freestyle.

The arena is situated in Hançerli Mah., Atatürk Boulevard. 17, İlkadım. The groundbreaking of the building took place on December 17, 2011. It was opened in presence of Minister of Youth and Sports Suat Kılıç on June 2, 2013. It is situated on Adnan Menderes Boulevard next to Ondokuz Mayıs University's İlkadım Campus. The sports hall hosts a great variety of sports in addition to badminton, basketball, fencing and volleyball competitions, like boxing, judo, karate, taekwondo, kickboxing, wrestling, weightlifting, table tennis, chess and shooting. The venue has a seating capacity for 2,000 spectators, including 100 for VIP, 100 for media members, 100 for accredited sportspeople and 80 for physically handicapped people.

== International events hosted ==
In 2016, the European Boxing Olympic Qualification Tournament and FIBA Europe Under-18 Championship were held in the sports hall. The venue will host volleyball events of the 2017 Summer Deaflympics.
