= Åkerby =

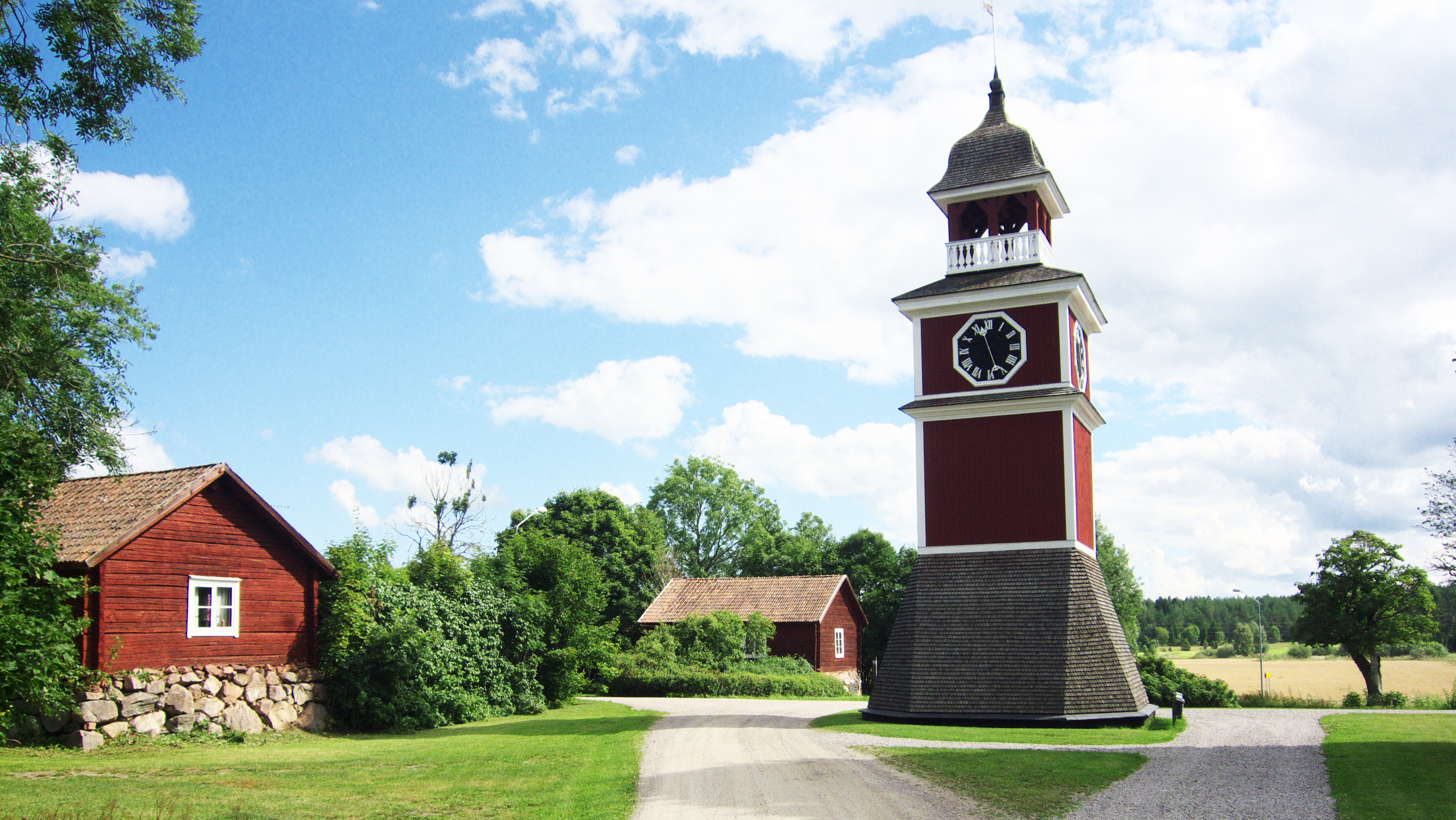
- The belfry at Åkerby mill

- Location within Uppsala Location within Sweden
- Coordinates: 60°25′09″N 17°46′06″E
- Country: Sweden
- Province: Uppland
- County: Uppsala
- Municipality: Tierp
- Time zone: UTC+1 (CET)
  - Summer (DST): UTC+2 (CEST)

Åkerby is a small village in Uppsala County, Uppland, Sweden. A famous place in Åkerby is Åkerby Vägskäl, where people gathered before emigrating to North America in the 19th century. Wilhelm Moberg wrote about this in his book Utvandrarna. Åkerby was also briefly mentioned in The Girl with the Dragon Tattoo, written by Stieg Larsson. The famous Swedish polymath Johannes Bureus was born in Åkerby in 1568.
