= Genealogia Sursilliana =

Genealogia Sursilliana is an old and large genealogy of Finnish Ostrobothnian families descending from a 16th-century wealthy Swedish farmer, Erik Ångerman, nicknamed Sursill. He had several children, both sons and daughters, most of whom moved to today's Finland. The Sursill genealogy consists of cognates (both male and female) descendants.

== History ==
A Swedish born 17th century bishop of Turku, Johannes Terserus, made a genealogy of the Ostrobothnian clergy families in his diocese, while making a large visitation in the diocese. According to the example of Johannes Bureus, he wanted to write a genealogy of the "large family in Ostrobothnia" which Bureus mentioned in his manuscript Om Bura namn och ätt. This "large family" descended from a wealthy farmer in Teg, Umeå, in West Bothnia, called Erik Ångerman, who had a nickname Sursill (meaning Surströmming). According to Bureus, Erik or his wife Dordi possibly descended from Bure family, although this remained uncertain. Most of Erik's and Dordi's children moved to Finland. Their many daughters and granddaughters married the progenitors of the well known clergy families, who thus became related with each other. This genealogy was not printed then, but survived as much copied manuscript.

In 19th century Elias Alcenius, pastor of Lapväärtti, continued the research and published 1850 Genealogia Sursilliana. The next and much enlarged edition by Eero Kojonen, Sursillin suku, was published in 1971 and sponsored by Kone Foundation. After that, many corrections and additions to the Sursill genealogy have been published.

In Finland, Genealogia Sursilliana meant the beginning of the scholarly genealogy by its lack of prestige. It represented a new type of genealogy compared with genealogies of the nobility at the time.

== Descendants ==
Sursilliana contains lineages e.g. from following families: Aejmelaeus, Ahlholm, Alcenius, Cajanus, Calamnius, Castrén, Forbus, Frosterus, Hedberg, Hoffren, Lithovius, Mathesius, Nylander, Roos, Schroderus, Snellman, Stenbäck, Toppelius, Wacklin, and Wegelius.

From the presidents of Finland, descendants of Sursill have been Kaarlo Juho Ståhlberg, Lauri Kristian Relander, Pehr Evind Svinhufvud, Carl Gustaf Emil Mannerheim, Urho Kekkonen and Tarja Halonen.

== Literature ==
- Sursillin suku: Genealogia Sursilliana. Täydentänyt ja toimittanut Eero Kojonen. Weilin + Göös, 1971
