= Bure kinship =

Scandinavian family

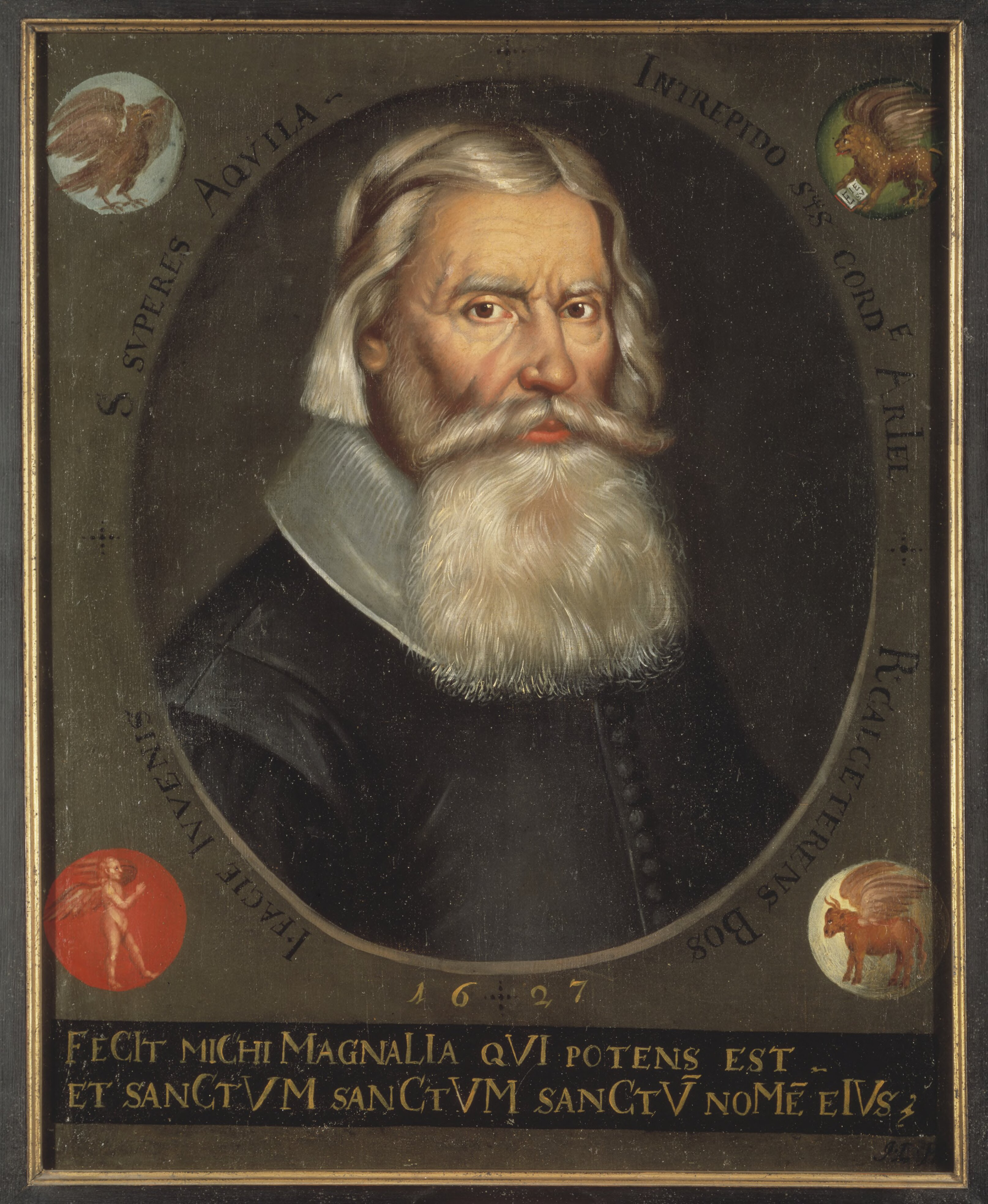
Johan Bure, 1568–1652.

The Bure kinship (Swedish: Bureätten) is a Scandinavian kinship, centered largely in the Skellefteå and Bureå areas in Northern Sweden.

Genealogical origins of the kinship are based to the most part on a Bure family genealogy written in the beginning of the 17th century by Johannes Bureus, in his manuscript Om Bura namn och ätt. The manuscript is stored at Riksarkivet ("State Archives"), and two younger copies of it are held at the Uppsala University Library (numbers X36 and X37).

In his genealogy, Bureus included all the family ancestors and descendants, whether male or female and regardless of what social standing or legitimacy each family member might have represented, thus making it possible for many modern-day families to trace their ancestry back to the Bure kinship. Some claims made in the genealogy were, however, disputed by a Bureus critic in 1890 as misinterpretations of rune-stone texts and – accordingly – as myths.

The history of the Bure kinship is complemented by the studies of Nils Burman (1705–1750), who wrote about the Bure family history until the middle of the 18th century. Some Bure family lines and individuals have acquired the names Bure, Burman and Burensköld. Some Bure family lines – as well as individuals from other family lines – are noble.

== See also ==
- Nolbystenen
- Genealogia Sursilliana
