= Davide Moretti =

Italian basketball player

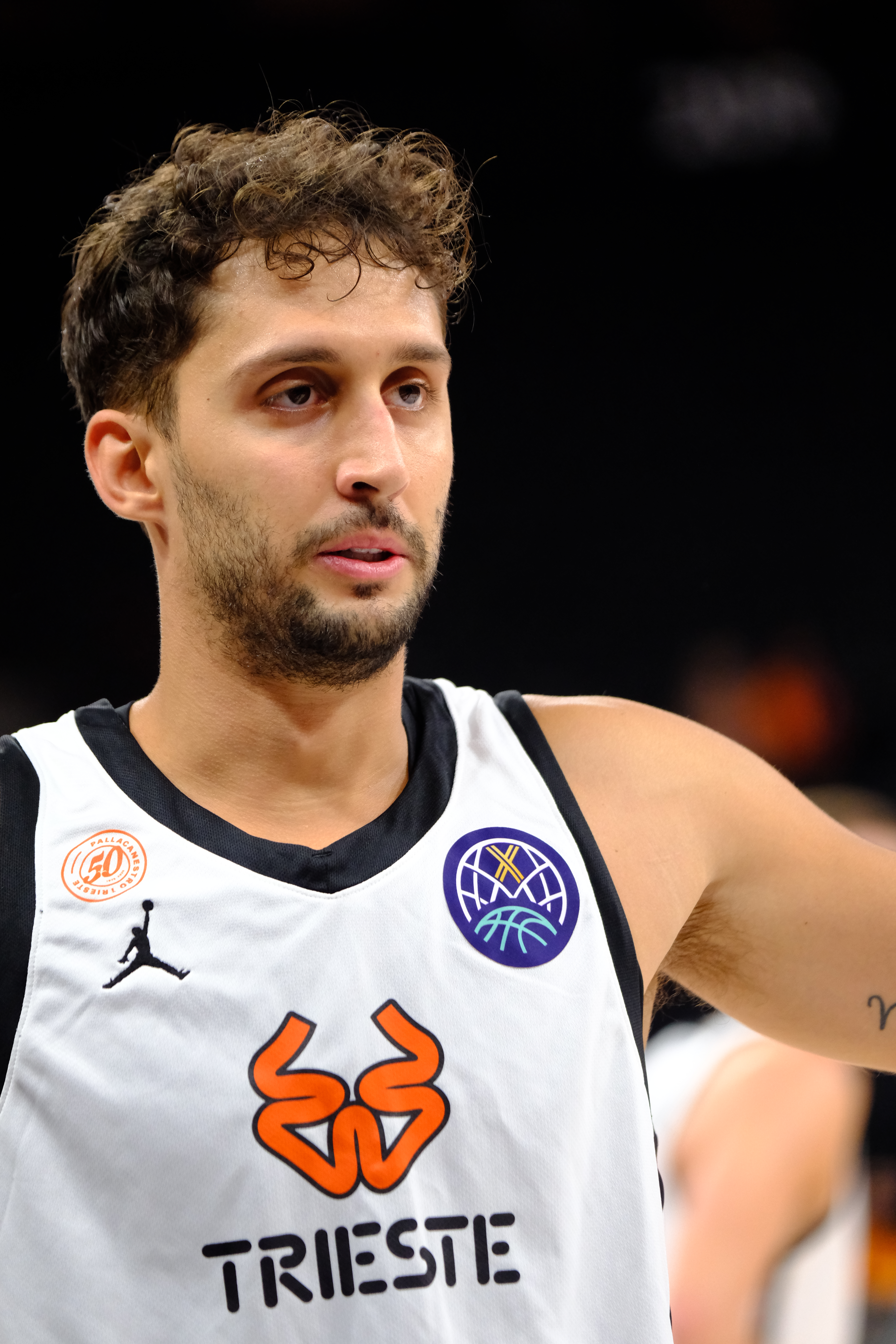
- Moretti with Pallacanestro Trieste in 2025

No. 25 – Pallacanestro Cantù
- Position: Point guard
- League: LBA

Personal information
- Born: 25 March 1998 (age 28) Bologna, Italy
- Listed height: 1.90 m (6 ft 3 in)
- Listed weight: 81 kg (179 lb)

Career information
- College: Texas Tech (2017–2020)
- NBA draft: 2021: undrafted
- Playing career: 2014–present

Career history
- 2014–2015: Pistoia
- 2015–2017: Universo Treviso
- 2020–2023: Olimpia Milano
- 2021–2023: →V.L. Pesaro
- 2023–2024: Pallacanestro Varese
- 2024–2025: Reyer Venezia
- 2025–2026: Pallacanestro Trieste
- 2026–present: Pallacanestro Cantù

Career highlights
- Italian Cup winner (2021); Italian Super Cup winner (2020); Third-team All-Big 12 (2019); Elite 90 Award (2019)
Medals
Men's basketball
Representing Italy
FIBA Europe Under-18 Championship
Bronze medal – third place	2016 Turkey	National team

Davide Moretti (born 25 March 1998) is an Italian professional basketball player for Pallacanestro Cantù of the Lega Basket Serie A (LBA). He played college basketball for the Texas Tech Red Raiders.

== Early life and career ==
In addition to basketball, Moretti grew up in Bologna, Italy playing soccer, tennis, and volleyball. In the 2013–14 season, he played for prominent Italian amateur club Stella Azzurra. In 2013, Moretti joined Stella Azzurra at the Città di Roma regional tournament for the Euroleague Basketball Next Generation Tournament. On 9 July 2014 he signed with Lega Basket Serie A (LBA) club Pistoia Basket 2000, where his father Paolo Moretti was head coach. Through 12 games, Moretti averaged 1.3 points in 6.9 minutes per game. For the next two seasons, he joined Universo Treviso Basket of the Serie A2 Basket. In the 2016–17 season, Moretti was named the best under-22 player in the Serie A2 after averaging 12.6 points, 2.3 assists, and 0.9 steals per game.

== College career ==
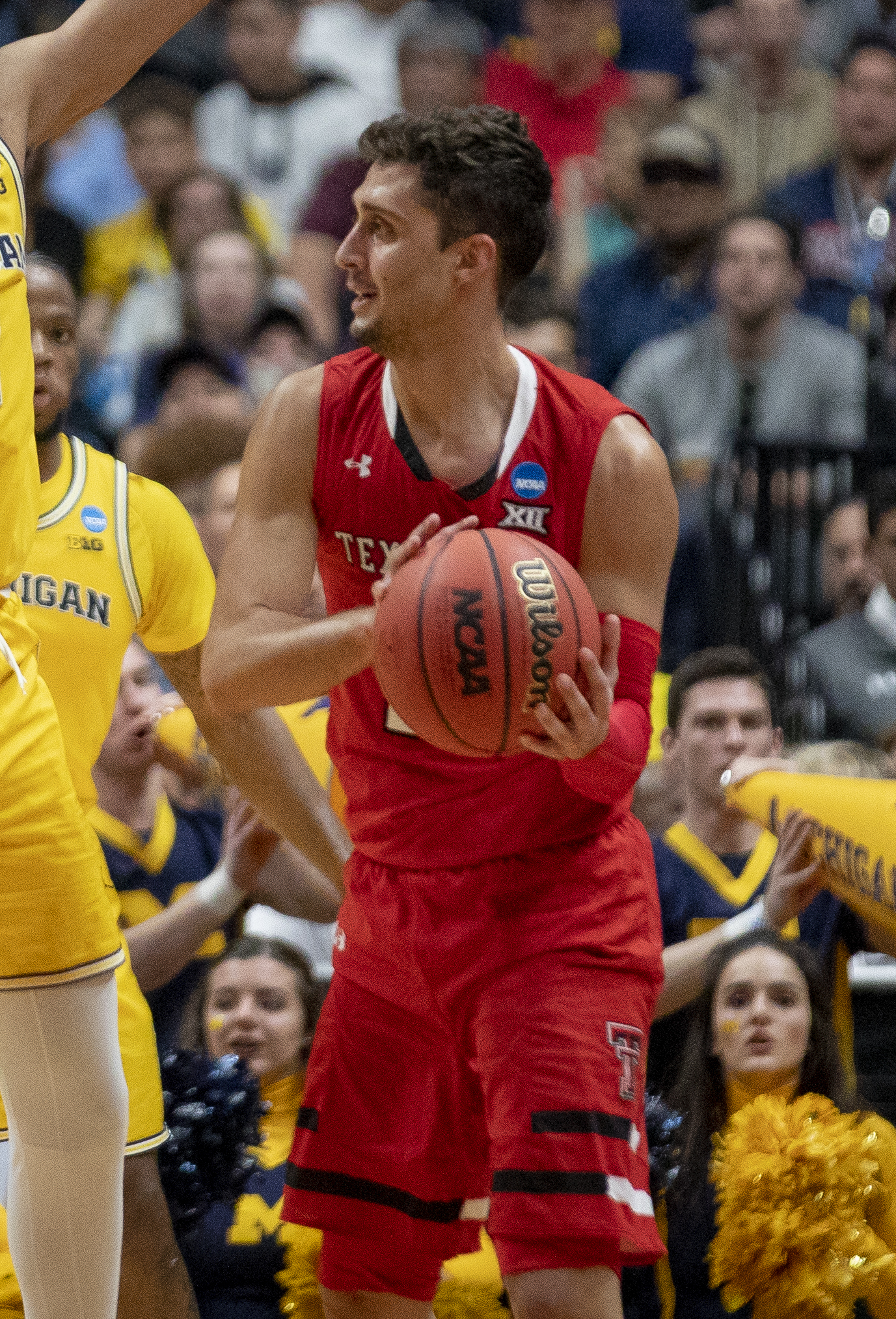
Moretti with Texas Tech in 2019

Moretti took his father's advice to improve as a basketball player through college basketball. On 12 June 2017 he signed an Athletic Scholarship Agreement to play for Texas Tech in the NCAA Division I. Moretti was drawn to the program in part because head coach Chris Beard had experience coaching the Swiss national team and was familiar with European styles of play. He chose Texas Tech over UConn, Indiana, and Utah. Moretti mainly came off the bench in his freshman season, averaging 3.5 points, 1.1 assists and 0.8 rebounds per game. He was named to the 2018 All-Big 12 Conference Academic Rookie Team.

Moretti became a regular starter as a sophomore. On 26 January 2019 he scored a career-high 21 points in a 67–64 win over Arkansas. By the end of the regular season, he was shooting 92.2 percent on free throws, which ranked second in the NCAA Division I. Moretti won the Elite 90 Award for academic excellence (Note: The NCAA presents this award at each of its 90 annual championship events (hence the name) to the upperclass player, defined as an individual in at least his or her second season of play, with the highest grade point average among those competing at the final championship site.) and earned third-team All-Big 12 recognition. He averaged 11.5 points, 2.4 assists, and 1.1 steals per game. Coming into his junior season, Moretti was named to the Bob Cousy Award Watch List. He was named Honorable Mention All-Big 12. As a junior, Moretti averaged 13 points, 2.3 assists, 1.7 rebounds and 1.2 steals per game and started all 31 games. On May 23, 2020, he decided to forego his senior season at Texas Tech to pursue a professional career in Europe, signing with agent Miško Raznatović of BeoBasket.

== Professional career ==
On 26 May 2020 Moretti signed a multi-year contract with Olimpia Milano of the Lega Basket Serie A and the EuroLeague.

In the season 2021–22, he plays on a loan contract for V.L. Pesaro.

On 4 July 2023 he signed with Pallacanestro Varese of the Lega Basket Serie A (LBA).

On 29 June 2024 he signed with Reyer Venezia of the Italian Lega Basket Serie A (LBA).

On July 7, 2025, he signed with Pallacanestro Trieste of the Italian Lega Basket Serie A (LBA).

On 17 September 2026, Moretti signed with Acqua S.Bernardo Cantù of the Lega Basket Serie A.

== National team career ==
Moretti has often represented Italy in FIBA junior tournaments. He averaged 10.4 points per game at the 2014 FIBA Under-17 World Championship in Dubai, leading the Italian national under-17 team to ninth place. Moretti guided the Italian under-19 team to a bronze medal at the 2016 FIBA Europe Under-18 Championship in Samsun, after averaging 14.8 points and five assists per game.

== Career statistics ==
Legend
GP	Games played	GS	Games started	MPG	Minutes per game
FG%	Field goal percentage	3P%	3-point field goal percentage	FT%	Free throw percentage
RPG	Rebounds per game	APG	Assists per game	SPG	Steals per game
BPG	Blocks per game	PPG	Points per game	**Bold**	Career high

*	Led NCAA Division I

=== College ===
Year	Team	GP	GS	MPG	FG%	3P%	FT%	RPG	APG	SPG	BPG	PPG
2017–18	Texas Tech	37	1	12.3	.336	.317	.857	.8	1.1	.4	.0	3.5
2018–19	Texas Tech	**38**	**38**	31.6	**.498**	**.459**	**.924***	**2.1**	**2.4**	1.1	.0	11.5
2019–20	Texas Tech	31	31	**34.1**	.419	.383	.902	1.7	2.3	**1.2**	.0	**13.0**
Career		106	70	25.6	.436	.399	.906	1.5	1.9	.9	.0	9.1

== Personal life ==
Moretti is the son of Paolo Moretti, who had a 15-year professional career in Europe and won a silver medal with the Italian national team at EuroBasket 1997. After retiring from playing during Davide's childhood, Paolo began coaching professionally and won the LBA Coach of the Year award with Pistoia in 2014. Moretti has a younger brother Niccolò, who plays basketball in Italy at the junior level.
