= Bureå =

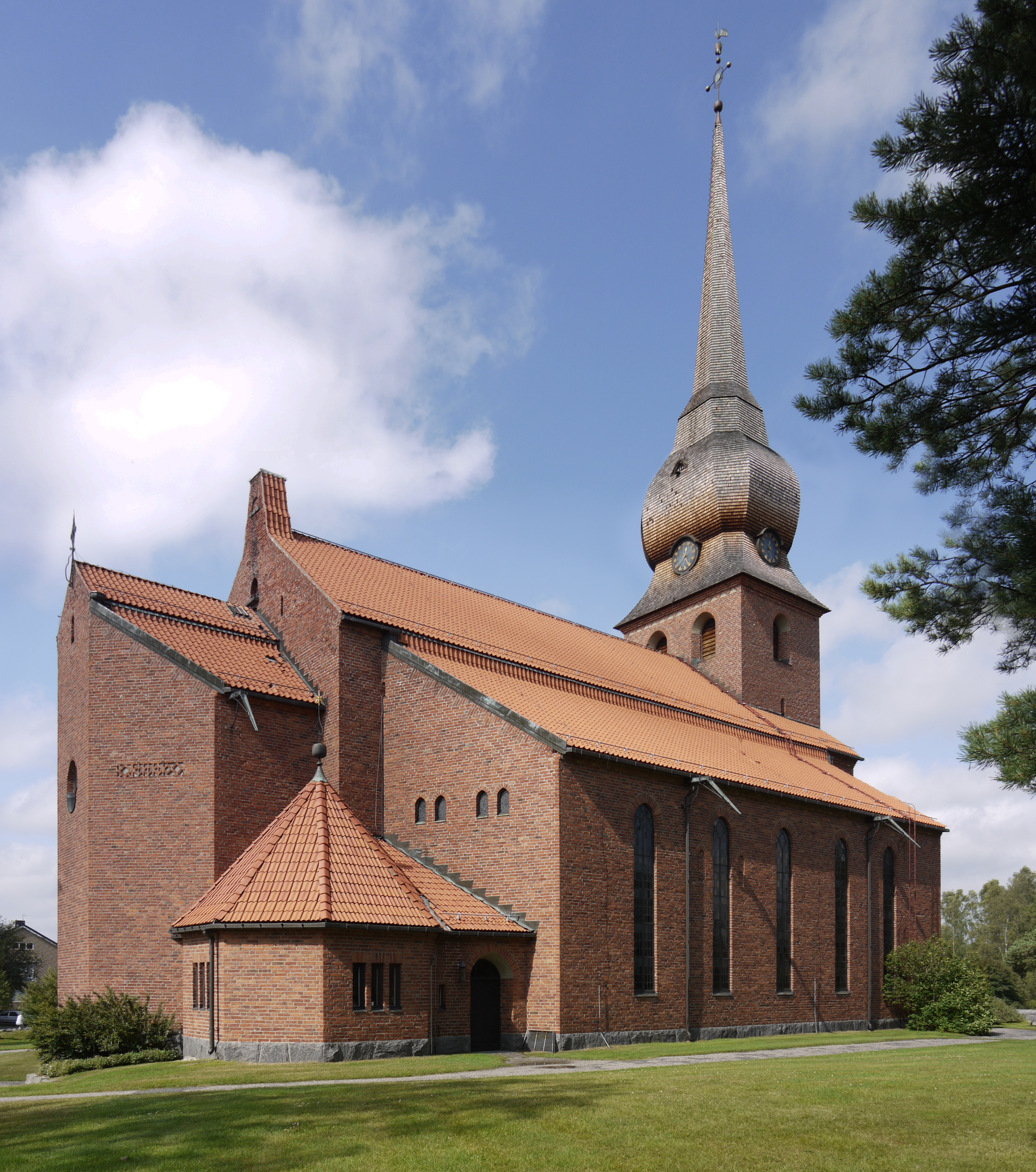
- Bureå Church

- Location within Västerbotten Location within Sweden
- Coordinates: 64°37′N 21°12′E
- Country: Sweden
- Province: Västerbotten
- County: Västerbotten County
- Municipality: Skellefteå Municipality

Area
  - Total: 3.65 km^{2} (1.41 sq mi)

Population (31 December 2010)
  - Total: 2,360
  - Density: 646/km^{2} (1,670/sq mi)
- Time zone: UTC+1 (CET)
  - Summer (DST): UTC+2 (CEST)

Bureå is a locality situated in Skellefteå Municipality, Västerbotten County, Sweden with 2,360 inhabitants in 2010. The famous Bure kinship is associated with the locality.
