= Sekou Doumbouya =

French basketball player (born 2000)

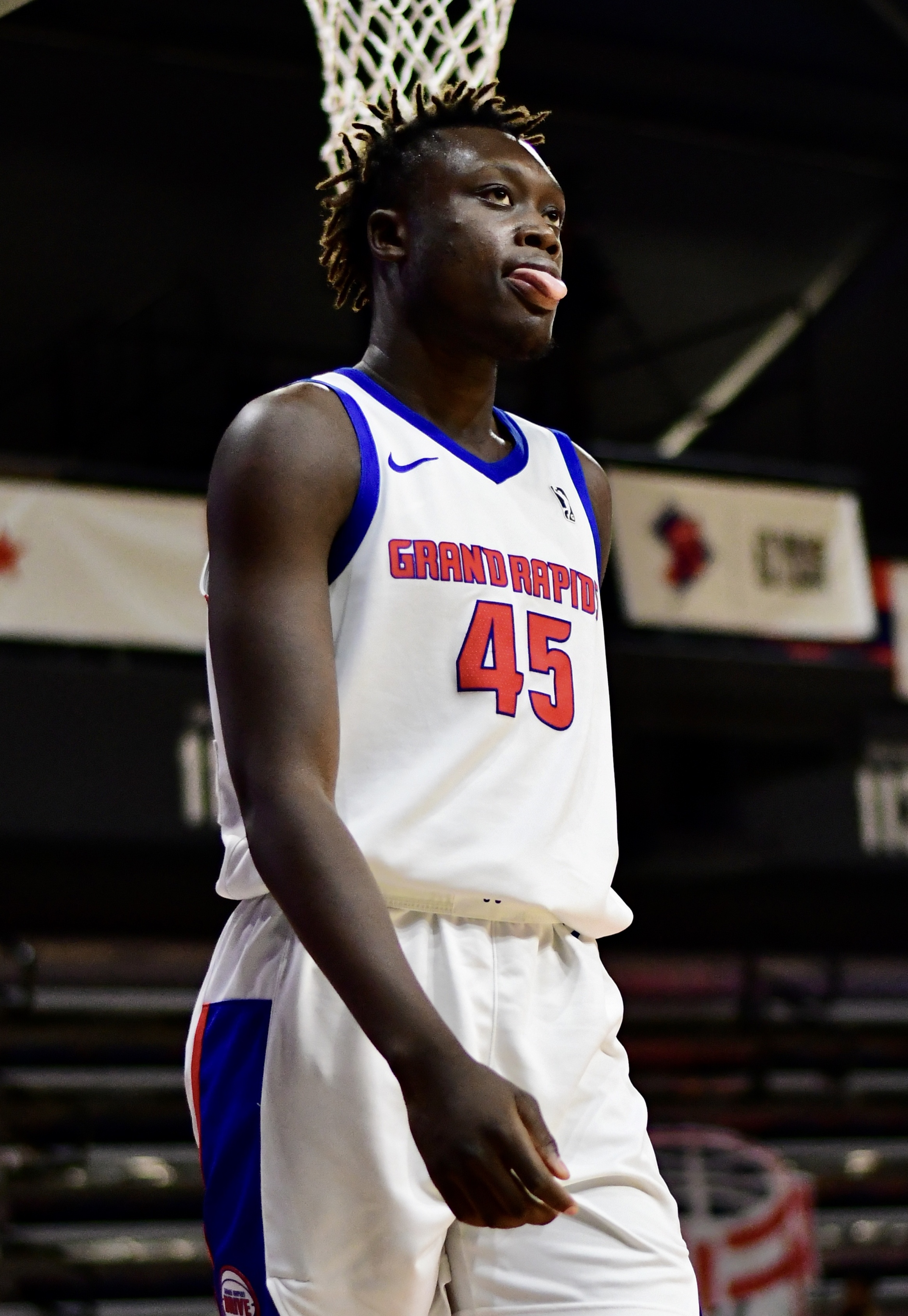
- Doumbouyka with the Grand Rapids Drive in 2019

No. 45 – San Pablo Burgos
- Position: Power forward / small forward
- League: Liga ACB; EuroCup

Personal information
- Born: 23 December 2000 (age 25) Conakry, Guinea
- Listed height: 6 ft 9 in (2.06 m)
- Listed weight: 230 lb (104 kg)

Career information
- NBA draft: 2019: 1st round, 15th overall pick
- Drafted by: Detroit Pistons
- Playing career: 2015–present

Career history
- 2015–2016: Centre Fédéral
- 2016–2018: Poitiers
- 2018–2019: Limoges CSP
- 2019–2021: Detroit Pistons
- 2019–2020: →Grand Rapids Drive
- 2021–2022: Los Angeles Lakers
- 2021–2022: →South Bay Lakers
- 2022–2023: Delaware Blue Coats
- 2024: Chorale Roanne Basket
- 2024–2025: Andorra
- 2025: Sagesse SC
- 2025–2026: Koshigaya Alphas
- 2026–present: San Pablo Burgos

Career highlights
- NBA G League champion (2023); Pro B Best Young Player (2018)
- Stats at NBA.com
- Stats at Basketball Reference
Medals
Men's basketball
Representing France
FIBA Europe Under-18 Championship
Gold medal – first place	2016 Turkey	Under-18

Sekou Oumar Doumbouya (born 23 December 2000) is a Guinean-French professional basketball player for San Pablo Burgos of the Spanish Liga ACB and the EuroCup. He plays both the power forward and small forward positions. Doumbouya was selected by the Detroit Pistons with the fifteenth pick in the 2019 NBA draft, and in his rookie season, he was the youngest active player in the NBA.

Born in Conakry, Guinea, Doumbouya grew up in Paris, France and began his career with local club CJF Les Aubrais when he was 13. In the following year, he attended INSEP and played for amateur team Centre Fédéral. His professional career started in 2016, when he joined Poitiers Basket 86 in the second-tier league of France, remaining with the team for two seasons. In 2018, Doumbouya moved to the first division by signing with Limoges CSP.

Doumbouya was a regular member of the youth sections of the France national team. He helped France win the gold medal at the 2016 FIBA Europe Under-18 Championship, finishing as his team's leading scorer. In 2026, he represented the Guinea national team in the 2027 FIBA Basketball World Cup qualification matches.

== Early life and career ==
Doumbouya was born in Conakry, Guinea. As a one-year-old, he moved to France with his mother M'Mah Marie, three siblings, and one cousin, settling in a small apartment in Fleury-les-Aubrais. His father, who was unable to receive a visa, remained in Guinea as a member of its military. In the absence of his father, Sekou became a leader for the rest of his family, often advising his siblings. Doumbouya grew up playing football as a striker but was eventually hindered by his extraordinary height. At age 12, he began playing pick-up basketball after a friend introduced him to the sport. At that age, he was discovered by local basketball coach Benoist Burguet, who helped start his basketball career and later became his trainer. By age 13, when Doumbouya stood 2.02 m (6 ft 7 1/2 in), he was playing youth basketball with his local club CJF Les Aubrais, the basketball sports section of Collège Condorcet.

In May 2016, Doumbouya represented French sports institute INSEP at the under-18 2015–16 Adidas Next Generation Tournament, averaging 14 points, 3.7 rebounds, and three assists while being one of the youngest players at the event at age 16. After the season, he was dismissed from INSEP for disciplinary reasons.

== Professional career ==
=== Centre Fédéral (2015–2016) ===
At age 14, Doumbouya moved to the renowned French sports institute INSEP in Paris and joined its affiliated club Centre Fédéral de Basket-ball, a member of the Nationale Masculine 1 (NM1), the amateur third-tier division of French basketball. He made his 2015–16 season debut on 26 September 2015, recording 12 points, five rebounds, and three steals against Aurore de Vitré. In turn, Doumbouya became the first player born in the 2000s to play in the top three French leagues. On 8 March 2016, he scored a season-high 23 points in a loss to Vendée Challans. Doumbouya finished the season averaging 10.6 points, 3.3 rebounds, 1.2 assists, and 1.4 steals per game.

=== Poitiers Basket 86 (2016–2018) ===
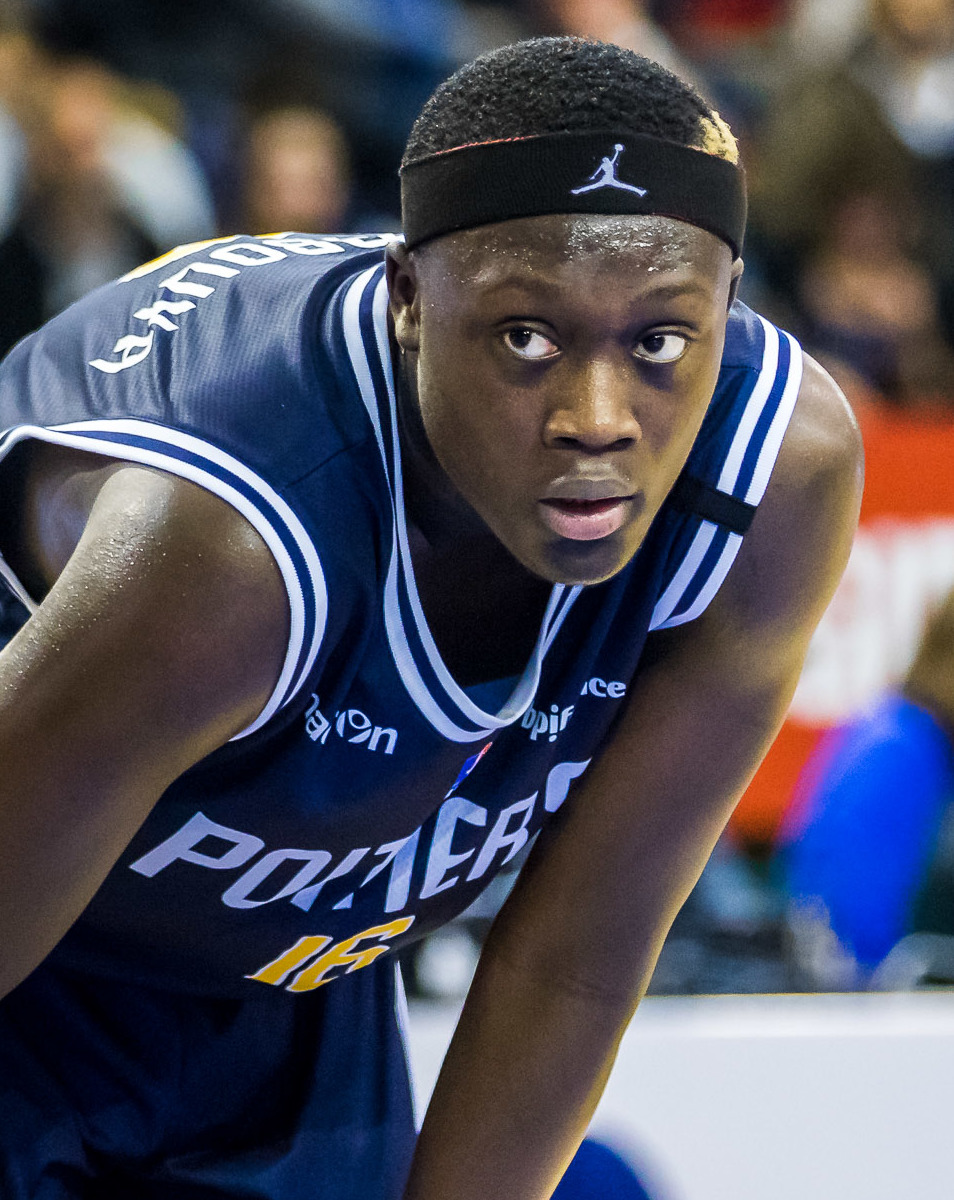
Doumbouya with Poitiers in March 2017

On 26 August 2016, at age 15, Doumbouya signed his first professional contract with Poitiers Basket 86 of the LNB Pro B, the second-tier French league. At the time, he revealed his hopes to play in the National Basketball Association (NBA) within the following three years. In the season, Doumbouya saw regular playing time despite his lack of experience, being coached by Ruddy Nelhomme and playing alongside veterans like Jeff Greer. While with Poitiers, he attended private school to work towards his diploma, and tried to model the focus he saw in former NBA player Michael Jordan with the help of a sports psychologist. On 17 September 2016, Doumbouya made his professional debut, playing 13 minutes in an LNB Pro B Leaders Cup victory over Boulazac. In his first Pro B season game on 14 October 2016, he scored two points in six minutes off the bench against Étoile Charleville-Mézières. He scored double figures for the first time on 20 January 2017, in an 81–63 loss to Fos Provence, posting a team-high 16 points on 7-of-11 shooting. In his next game, a defeat to Lille Métropole, Doumbouya scored a season-high 21 points and nine rebounds, shooting 3-of-3 from the three-point line. He finished the season averaging 6.8 points, 3.3 rebounds, and 0.8 assists in 16.9 minutes per game.

Doumbouya, on 29 June 2017, signed a three-year contract extension with Poitiers. On 29 September, he notched a double-double of 15 points and 12 rebounds in a 76–71 win over Hermine Nantes at the LNB Pro B Leaders Cup. Doumbouya debuted in the 2017–18 Pro B season against Denain Voltaire on 13 October 2017, recording seven points and four rebounds in 16 minutes. On 22 December, he scored a season-best 19 points and eight rebounds in a loss to Saint-Chamond. Doumbouya eclipsed that mark on 2 February 2018, in a career-high 26-point effort against UJAP Quimper 29. In 28 games, he averaged 8.5 points, 4.1 rebounds, and one assist in 23.2 minutes per game, en route to earning Pro B Best Young Player honors.

=== Limoges CSP (2018–2019) ===
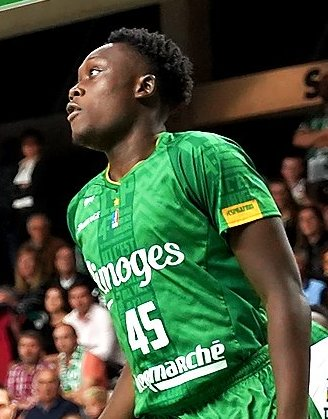
Doumbouya with Limoges CSP in September 2018

In May 2018, Doumbouya revealed plans to join a team in the LNB Pro A, the top basketball league in France. On 25 June 2018, he signed with Limoges CSP of the Pro A. Head coach Kyle Milling praised the newcomer: "Despite his age, next season, I rely on him being an impact player. He has tremendous physical qualities: running, counterattack and speed." Doumbouya debuted for Limoges on 22 September 2018, recording two points and four rebounds in 11 minutes against Antibes. On 17 October, he scored 11 points, shooting 4-of-6 from the field, in a 102–93 loss to Alba Berlin in the EuroCup. In late December, Doumbouya scored 12 points in three straight games in the EuroCup and Pro A, shooting a combined 14-of-17 from the field. On 26 December, he suffered a right thumb injury that required surgery.

Doumbouya returned to action on 9 February, scoring nine points and grabbing five rebounds versus Strasbourg. On 9 March, he recorded a season-high 14 points, five rebounds, and two blocks in an 85–73 loss to Monaco. Doumbouya erupted for a career-high 34 points, with five three-pointers and nine rebounds, on 18 May, in a 106–78 regular season finale win over Levallois Metropolitans. In 29 Pro A games, including two playoff contests, he averaged 7.7 points and 3.2 rebounds per game. In eight EuroCup appearances, Doumbouya averaged 6.9 points and 2.8 rebounds per game.

=== Detroit Pistons (2019–2021) ===
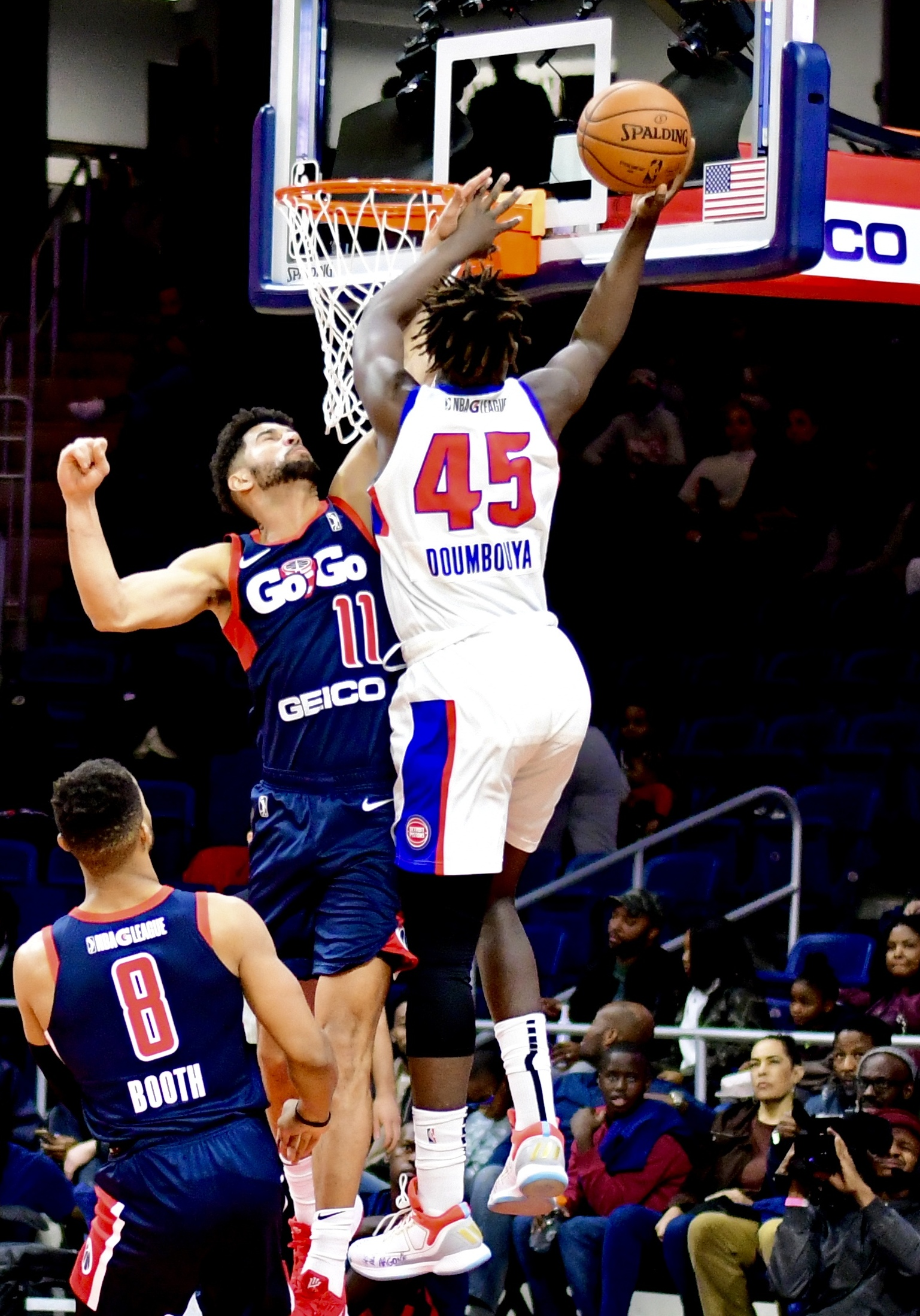
Doumbouya (#45) attempts a layup for the Grand Rapids Drive in 2019.

On 20 June 2019, Doumbouya was selected by the Detroit Pistons with the fifteenth pick in the 2019 NBA draft. He became the first player born in Guinea to be drafted into the NBA. On 4 July, he signed his rookie contract with the Pistons. Doumbouya missed his team's first four games at the 2019 Las Vegas NBA Summer League with hamstring pain and scored nine points in his only appearance, during a 105–85 loss to the Brooklyn Nets. In his rookie season, he was the youngest active player in the NBA. He suffered a concussion during practice on 9 October and was sidelined for multiple games after being placed into the concussion protocol program. On 4 November, before playing an NBA game, Doumbouya was assigned to the Pistons' NBA G League affiliate, the Grand Rapids Drive. He made his G League debut four days later, scoring 12 points in a 109–94 win over Raptors 905.

On 23 November 2019, Doumbouya was recalled by the Pistons and made his NBA debut in a 104–90 loss to the Milwaukee Bucks. In early January 2020, he registered double-doubles in each of his first two starts against the Los Angeles Clippers and the Golden State Warriors. On 15 January, Doumbouya scored a season-high 24 points with two rebounds, an assist and a steal in a 116–103 victory over the Boston Celtics. His production declined after the performance, and he scored at least 10 points in one more NBA game for the rest of the season. On 6 March, Doumbouya was assigned to the G League, recording 30 points and eight rebounds and making a game-winning jump shot in a 102–101 win over the Maine Red Claws. In the 2019–20 NBA season, he averaged 6.4 points and 3.1 rebounds in 19.8 minutes per game, starting in 19 of his 38 appearances.

=== Los Angeles Lakers (2021–2022) ===
On 4 September 2021, Doumbouya and Jahlil Okafor were traded to the Brooklyn Nets in exchange for DeAndre Jordan and multiple second-round draft picks. On 6 October, Doumbouya was again traded, alongside a 2024 second-round pick, to the Houston Rockets in exchange for cash considerations. He was waived the following day.

On 12 October, the Los Angeles Lakers signed Doumbouya to a two-way contract with the South Bay Lakers of the NBA G League. On 16 November, Doumbouya was waived by the Lakers, after appearing in two games, to make room for Chaundee Brown.

On 12 January 2022, the Lakers re-signed Doumbouya to a two-way contract. However, before appearing in a game during his second stint with the team, he was waived on 1 March.

=== Delaware Blue Coats (2022–2023) ===
On 4 November 2022, Doumbouya was named to the opening night roster for the Delaware Blue Coats, and eventually helped the team win the NBA G League title.

=== Chorale Roanne Basket (2024) ===
On 23 February 2024, Doumbouya signed with Chorale Roanne Basket of the LNB Pro A.

=== MoraBanc Andorra (2024–2025) ===
On 14 July 2024, Doumbouya signed with MoraBanc Andorra of the Spanish Liga ACB.

=== Sagesse Club (2025) ===
On 29 May 2025, Doumbouya signed with Sagesse Club of the Lebanese Basketball League (LBL).

=== San Pablo Burgos (2026–present) ===
On 3 September 2026, Doumbouya signed with the San Pablo Burgos of the Liga ACB and the EuroCup.

== National team career ==
In November 2016, Doumbouya obtained French citizenship. The process was delayed by months due to "bureaucracy," according to the France national under-18 team, and as a result he was barred from two FIBA competitions. Doumbouya made his national team debut at the 2016 FIBA Europe Under-18 Championship in Samsun, Turkey, which he entered as its youngest player. In his first game at the tournament, a 53–48 win over Russia, he scored seven points and grabbed a team-high 10 rebounds. In his next contest, Doumbouya led all scorers with 22 points and six rebounds against Slovenia. In his third game, he erupted for 31 points, shooting 10-of-11 from the field, to lead France past Serbia, 71–68. Doumbouya averaged a team-best 17.8 points, seven rebounds, 1.3 steals, and 1.2 blocks at the tournament, helping his team win the gold medal. He was named to the All-Star Five, joined by teammate and tournament most valuable player Frank Ntilikina.

== Player profile ==
Listed at 2.03 m (6 ft 8 in) and 104 kg (229 lb), Doumbouya is primarily a small forward but is capable of playing the power forward position due to his size and length, standing 2.05 m (6 ft 8 3/4 in) with a wingspan of 2.11 m (6 ft 11 in). He displays fluid athleticism that helps him thrive in transition and finish at the rim. His physical tools gave him great potential in the modern NBA, especially on the defensive end, where he is able to defend four positions. Doumbouya also had potential as a shooter, with evaluators often praising his mechanics, and as a playmaker. His playing style has drawn comparisons to NBA players Pascal Siakam and Draymond Green. Vincent Loriot, sports director for French club Le Mans, likened Doumbouya to NBA player LeBron James, calling him "a monster with a child's face".

== Career statistics ==
Legend
GP	Games played	GS	Games started	MPG	Minutes per game
FG%	Field goal percentage	3P%	3-point field goal percentage	FT%	Free throw percentage
RPG	Rebounds per game	APG	Assists per game	SPG	Steals per game
BPG	Blocks per game	PPG	Points per game	**Bold**	Career high

=== NBA ===
==== Regular season ====
Year	Team	GP	GS	MPG	FG%	3P%	FT%	RPG	APG	SPG	BPG	PPG
2019–20	Detroit	38	**19**	**19.8**	.390	.286	.674	**3.1**	**.5**	.5	.2	6.4
2020–21	Detroit	**56**	11	15.5	.379	.226	.703	2.6	**.8**	.4	.2	5.1
2021–22	L.A. Lakers	2	0	8.0	**.625**	**.500**	**.750**	3.0	.0	**1.5**	**1.0**	**7.0**
Career		96	30	17.1	.388	.256	.693	2.8	.7	.5	.2	5.6

=== EuroCup ===
Year	Team	GP	GS	MPG	FG%	3P%	FT%	RPG	APG	SPG	BPG	PPG
2018–19	Limoges	8	2	14.9	.548	.250	.625	2.8	.6	.8	.5	6.9
