= Andreas Hackzelius =

Andreas Laurenitt Hackzelius (born in 1630 in Hacksta, Uppland, Sweden; died on 7 July 1681 in Holm, Uppland, Sweden) was a priest of the Church of Sweden.

== Early life ==
Andreas was born to Lars Eriksson (1605-1674) and Karin Matsdotter (1610-1682) in midst of the 30 Years' War (1618–1648). When Andreas turned 18, the war ended. This freed Andreas – instead of soldiering – to pursue a career closer to his heart. Andreas applied and was accepted to Uppsala University to study theology and languages. Andreas became a clergyman.

With his career choice Andreas detached himself as well as all his future offspring from the family's long time tradition of farming and operating a plantation, which his father Lars, grandfather Erik and great-grandfather Bengt had represented in Uppland, Sweden.

== Life as a priest ==
Upon Andreas' inauguration to the Lutheran ministry, the churchly commissions of Andreas came to include - among other things - the heading of congregations of the parishes of Kulla and Holm in the Lagunda Hundred in Uppland, Sweden.

Andreas Hackzelius became the first rector – head of a congregation – to oversee the newly constructed Church of Holm, erected in 1678 in the Parish of Holm, between Lårstaviken and Gorran in Mälaren, 17 km north of Bålsta, in the municipality of Enköping in Uppland, Sweden.

The new church was closely connected with the nearby Sjöö Castle (modern spelling: Sjö), which was built at the same time with the church. The construction work of the castle lasted from 1669 until 1679. The castle was owned by a patron (Latin: patrōnus) of the church, the Marshal of the Realm of Sweden Johan Gabriel Stenbock (1640–1705), one of the most powerful people in Sweden in the 17th century.

In the 17th century, the patronage of the Church of Holm consisted of high-ranking statesmen, clergymen, military officers as well as royal and other high noble friends and family members of Stenbock. In a 17th-century letter remaining, the Queen of Sweden Christina (1626–1689) compliments and thanks Rector Andreas Hackzelius for a church service and sermon given by him.

== Marriage ==
The Hackzell family name derives from the Hacksta family estate, located in Hacksta, Uppland in Sweden. On 28 October 1671 Andreas Hackzelius married Brita Mårtensdotter Hörling (1649–1710) from Stockholm, Sweden. The couple had a son - their only child -, Mårten Hacksell (1674–1725), who became a commander and a chief enforcement officer (Swedish: kronofogde) for the Swedish crown.

Through Mårten Hackzell and his offspring, the Hackzell family spread to Norrland and Finland. Mårten's son Anders Hackzell (1705-1757) followed in Mårten's footsteps as a chief enforcement officer for the Swedish crown, becoming also a well-known cartographer and mapper.

Andreas Hackzelius died on 7 July 1681 in Uppland, Sweden. Among his best-known descendants is the World-War-II-period Prime Minister of Finland Antti Hackzell (1881–1946).

== Sources ==
- Sjöö slott: Nicodemus Tessin d.ä. och Johan Gabriel Stenbock som aktörer vid ett stormaktstida slottsbygge, Johan Eriksson & Peter Liljenstolpe, Uppsala, 2001. ISBN 91-506-1514-9.
- Kulla kyrka, Rune Norberg, Upplands kyrkor, Stiftsrådet i Uppsala, 1952. (Vol. 4, chapter 49)
- Kulla och Hjälsta kyrkor: Lagunda härad, Uppland band XII:1, Ann Catherine Bonnier and Robert Bennett, Stockholm: Almqvist & Wiksell, 1970, Sveriges kyrkor ("Churches of Sweden"), Uppland.
- Våra kyrkor, Klarkullens förlag, Västervik, 1990, ISBN 91-971561-0-8.
- Vägvisare till kyrkorna i Uppsala län, pages 105-106, Karin Blent (editor), Länsstyrelsen i Uppsala län, 1997, ISBN 91-85618-54-3.
- Slott och herresäten i Sverige – Uppland (II).
- Svenska slott och herrgårdar – by Fredric Bedoire.
- Svenska män och kvinnor – by Bonniers förlag, 1954.
- Svensk uppslagsbok – a Swedish encyclopedia published between 1929 and 1955 in two editions.
- Det medeltida Sverige 1:6 ("The Medieval Sweden").
- Slottsguiden ("Castle Guide") by slottsguiden.info.
- Vapenbok ("Book of Coats of Arm") by passagen.se.
