= Sjöö Castle =

Swedish castle in Uppland

- Sweden
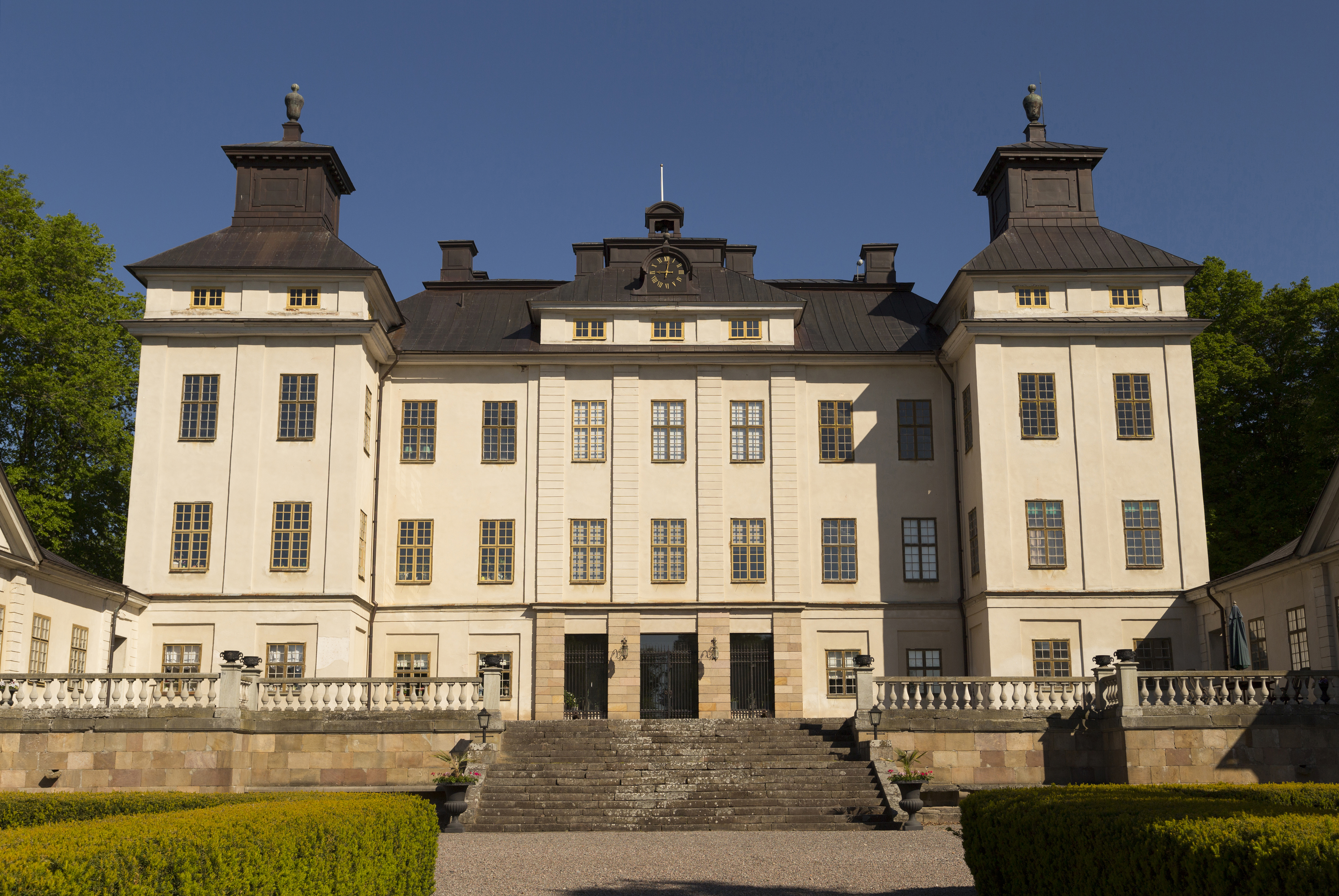

Site information
- Type: Castle

Location
- Coordinates: 59°43′04″N 17°30′29″E

Sjöö Castle (modern spelling: Sjö) is a castle in the tiny Parish of Holm (population in the year 2000: 26), in the Municipality of Enköping in Uppland, Sweden. The Sjöö Castle Palace with its park is considered one of the most beautiful in Sweden, with its perfect and harmonious proportions.

== History ==
The recorded history of the courtyard of Sjöö Castle begins from the Middle Ages. In 1409, Peter Laurensson took over the estate.

In 1541, Gustav Vasa bought the estate from the bailiff Jacob Vestgöte Sjöö. Later, the castle was turned over by Erik XIV to Gustaf Johansson (Three Roses).

The estate was then passed in succession to Johan Gabriel Stenbock (1640–1705), who was one of the most powerful people in Sweden. As the Marshal of the Realm of Sweden, Stenbock was a statesman, head of the court and chairman of the castle law. In the 17th century, the marshals of the realm were recruited from high noble families. Together with the renowned Swedish architect Nicodemus Tessin the Elder (1615–1681) and the architect and master builder Mathias Spieler (1640–1691), Stenbock built Sjöö Castle to his estate. The construction work lasted from 1669 until 1679.

The nearby Church of Holm—closely connected with the castle—was erected in 1678, under the watchful eyes of Andreas Hackzelius (1630–1681) who became the first Rector—head of congregation—of the Parish of Holm to utilize the new facilities. The patronage of the Church of Holm then consisted of high-ranking statesmen and royal and other high noble friends and family members of Johan Gabriel Stenbock who owned Sjöö Castle.

Johan Stenbock died unmarried. His sister's son's daughter Hedvig Catharina Lilje inherited the Castle. Lilje married with Magnus Julius De la Gardie. Her son, Fredrik, was married to the famous Catherine Charlotte De la Gardie, who lived in the Castle between 1748 and 1763.

In 1813, the castle was sold to Johan Gustaf Banér. Since then, the Banér family has owned the castle.

== See also ==
- List of castles in Sweden
