= Alessandro Lever =

Italian basketball player (born 1998)

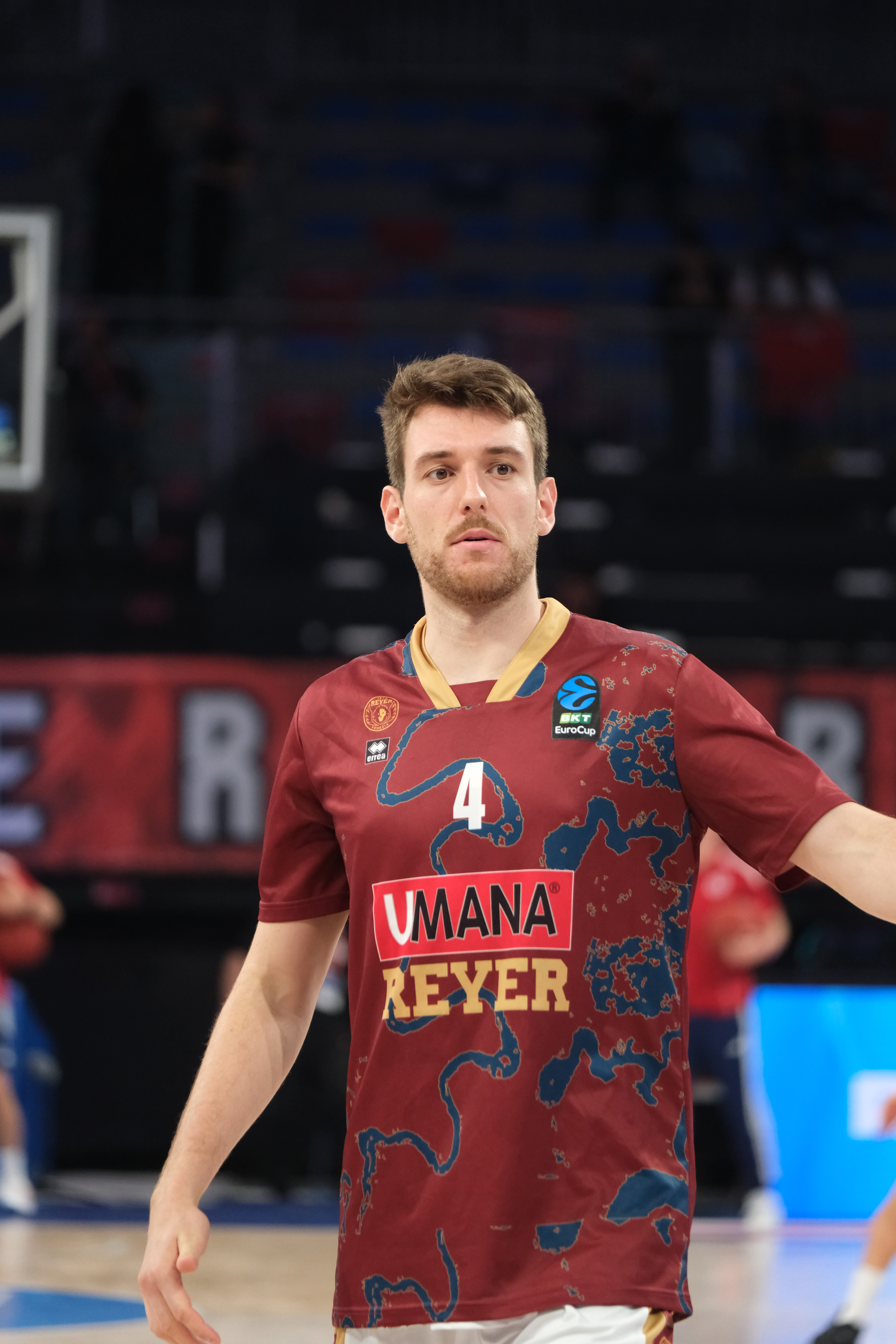
- Lever with Reggiana in 2016

No. 4 – Longobardi Scafati Basket
- Position: Center
- League: LBA

Personal information
- Born: December 4, 1998 (age 27) Bolzano, Italy
- Listed height: 2.08 m (6 ft 10 in)
- Listed weight: 104 kg (229 lb)

Career information
- College: Grand Canyon (2017–2021)
- Playing career: 2015–present

Career history
- 2015–2017: Reggiana
- 2021–2023: Pallacanestro Trieste
- 2023–2024: Napoli Basket
- 2024–2026: Reyer Venezia
- 2026–present: Scafati Basket

Career highlights
- Italian Cup winner (2024); 2× First-team All-WAC (2018, 2021); Second-team All-WAC (2020); WAC Freshman of the Year (2018)
Medals
Men's basketball
Representing Italy
FIBA Europe Under-18 Championship
Bronze medal – third place	2016 Turkey	Team

Alessandro Lever (born 4 December 1998) is an Italian basketball player for Scafati Basket of the Lega Basket Serie A (LBA).

== Youth career ==
On September 10, 2014, Lever signed with Italian side Grissin Bon Reggio Emilia. In the 2015-16 season he played three games for the team, and then played a EuroCup game. In the 2016–17 season, he played a single game for the team where he scored three points and had a rebound.

== College career ==
Lever began playing college basketball for Grand Canyon in Phoenix in 2017. In his freshman season, he averaged 12.2 points, 4.4 rebounds and 1.2 assists per game. In his sophomore year, he averaged 12.5 points, 4.3 rebounds and 1.4 assists per game. In his junior season he averaged 16 points, 5.9 rebounds and 2.3 assists per came. In a match against Illinois State, Lever scored 23 points as Grand Canyon won, 68–63. Lever was named to the Second Team All-Western Athletic Conference. During his senior year, he helped lead Grand Canyon to their first NCAA tournament in program history.

== Professional career ==
After the college years, Lever returned to Italy signing with Pallacanestro Trieste.

On July 3, 2023, he signed with Napoli Basket of the Italian Lega Basket Serie A (LBA).

On June 22, 2024, he signed with Reyer Venezia of the Italian Lega Basket Serie A (LBA).

On July 4, 2026, he signed with Scafati Basket of the Lega Basket Serie A (LBA).

== National team career ==
Lever represented Italy in the 2014 FIBA Europe Under-16 Championship in Latvia where he averaged 5 points, 2.8 rebounds and 0.3 assists per game. He also participated in the 2016 FIBA U18 European Championship where he averaged 13.2 points, 5.8 rebounds and 0.7 assists per game. He also participated in the 2018 FIBA U20 European Championship where he averaged 13.9 points, 5.1 rebounds and 0.6 assists.

== Career statistics ==
Legend
GP	Games played	GS	Games started	MPG	Minutes per game
FG%	Field goal percentage	3P%	3-point field goal percentage	FT%	Free throw percentage
RPG	Rebounds per game	APG	Assists per game	SPG	Steals per game
BPG	Blocks per game	PPG	Points per game	**Bold**	Career high

=== College ===
Year	Team	GP	GS	MPG	FG%	3P%	FT%	RPG	APG	SPG	BPG	PPG
2017–18	Grand Canyon	**34**	27	21.3	.453	.321	.766	4.4	1.2	.4	**.4**	12.2
2018–19	Grand Canyon	**34**	**33**	25.5	.447	.354	.748	4.3	1.4	.4	.1	12.5
2019–20	Grand Canyon	30	30	**33.5**	**.535**	**.383**	**.789**	**6.0**	**2.2**	**.5**	.2	**15.7**
2020–21	Grand Canyon	24	24	28.5	.509	.378	.634	5.4	1.7	.3	.2	13.3
Career		122	114	26.9	.485	.359	.741	4.9	1.6	.4	.2	13.4
