= Burre =

Burre is a British surname derived from bur, a seed or dry fruit that has hooks or teeth. The surname may refer to the following notable people:

- Brandy Burre (born 1974), American actress
- Walter Burre (fl.1597–1622), British bookseller and publisher

== See also ==
- Bure
