= Coat of arms of Helsinki =

- Armiger: Daniel Sazonov, Mayor of Helsinki
- Adopted: 1951

The coat of arms of Helsinki first appeared in an early 17th-century seal of the city of Helsinki, the modern-day capital of Finland. The crown in the coat of arms refers to the historical connection to the Swedish monarchy, while the boat refers to emigration to Helsinki. The coats of arms of both Helsinki and Uusimaa were designed in 1599 by Johannes Bureus.

The current design of the coat of arms of Helsinki was drawn by the heraldist A. W. Rancken in 1951. Its blazon states: ”On a field azure, boat or on waves argent; crown or above the boat.”
