= Wegelius =

Finnish family

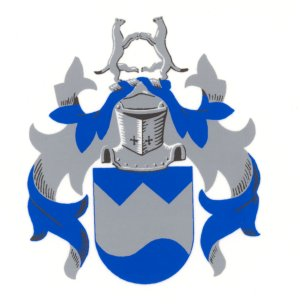
Coat of arms of the Wegelius family

The Wegelius family is originally from the county of Ilmajoki in Ostrobothnia, Finland. The family's forefather is considered to be Jakob Eriksson Uppa who was the master of the Seinäjoki-based Uppala house in the early 17th century. The Wegelius family consists of many famous individual political figures, bankers, engineers, musicians and sportsmen. The family name Wegelius derives from the name of the Finnish city Seinäjoki. Literally translated to Swedish, Seinäjoki is vägg-älv, or wegg-elf in former Swedish spelling, in Latin form Wegelius.

== Notable members ==
- Martin Wegelius (1846–1906), Finnish composer and musicologist, primarily remembered as the founder of the Helsinki Music Institute
- Theodor Wegelius, politician and the governor of the Bank of Finland 1898–1906
- Magnus Wegelius, Olympic sportsman
- Edward Wegelius, Finnish aeronautical engineer and general manager of VTT
- Christopher Wegelius, Finnish showjumper and banker, father of Charly Wegelius
  - Charly Wegelius, professional road cyclist, son of Christopher
- Kristiina Wegelius, Olympic sportswoman
- Annie Wegelius, Swedish TV presenter
- Jakob Wegelius, Swedish author of children's books
