= Mathias Spieler =

Swedish architect

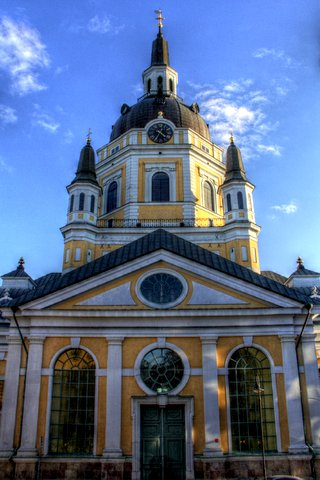
Katarina Kyrka at Högbergsgatan in Stockholm

Mathias Spihler (c. 1640 – February 1691) was a Swedish architect and master builder of German descent.

== Biography ==
Spihler was born at Södermalm in Stockholm, Sweden.

He aided Jean de la Vallée in the design and construction of Katarina Kyrka (Catherine Church) as technical superintendent at the church in 1671. Spieler also built the Van der Nootska Palace between 1671 and 1672.

In the latter half of the 17th century, Marshal of the Realm of Sweden Johan Gabriel Stenbock (1640-1705) brought the Sjöö estate in the parish of Holm in Enköping. Together with Mathias Spieler and architect Nicodemus Tessin the Elder (1615-1681), Stenbock built Sjöö Castle on his estate. The construction work lasted from 1669 until 1679 resulting in the shape and form in which it is today. Sjöö Castle Palace with its park is considered one of the most beautiful in Sweden, with its perfect and harmonious proportions.

Spieler was married to Margaret de la Vallée, daughter of Jean de la Vallée. Spieler died in Stockholm. He is buried in Kungsholms kyrka (Ulrika Eleonora Church) which he built in 1672.
