= Leo Čizmić =

Israeli-born Croatian basketball player

Bàsquet Girona
- Position: Small forward
- League: LEB Plata

Personal information
- Born: December 17, 1998 (age 27) Afula, Israel
- Listed height: 204 cm (6 ft 8 in)

Career information
- Playing career: 2015–present

Career history
- 2015–2017: Sevilla
- 2017–2018: Araberri
- 2018–present: Girona
Medals
Men's basketball
Representing Croatia
FIBA Europe Under-20 Championship Division B
Silver medal – second place	2017 Romania	National U-20 Team

Leo Čizmić (Hebrew: לאו צ'יזמיץ; born December 17, 1998) is an Israeli-born Croatian professional basketball player who plays for Bàsquet Girona of the LEB Plata.

== Career ==
The son of former basketball player Teo Čizmić, who was a member of the Yugoslavian junior national team and played professionally in a number of European countries, he was born in Israel, where his father was playing at the time.

Čizmić came through the youth ranks of KK Split and headed to Spain in 2014 to join Baloncesto Sevilla. He played for the club's youth team and for their second men's team, before making his debut in Spain's top-tier Liga ACB in the 2015–16 season. He would then flit between Sevilla's ACB squad and their affiliate teams.

Čizmić moved to Araberri of the Spanish second-tier LEB Oro for the 2017–18 season.

== International career ==
He was a member of the Croatian national team that participated in the 2014 FIBA Europe Under-16 Championship and the 2016 FIBA Europe Under-18 Championship.
