= Karlo Uljarević =

Croatian basketball player

Jazine Arbanasi
- Position: Guard
- League: First Men's Basketball League

Personal information
- Born: November 20, 1998 (age 27) Osijek, Croatia
- Listed height: 1.90 m (6 ft 3 in)

Career information
- NBA draft: 2020: undrafted
- Playing career: 2013–present

Career history
- 2013–2014: Osječki sokol
- 2014–2018: Cibona
- 2018–2019: Škrljevo
- 2019–2020: Zadar
- 2020–2023: Gorica
- 2023–2024: Škrljevo
- 2024: Basket Ravenna
- 2024–present: Jazine Arbanasi

Career highlights
- Croatian Cup winner (2020)
Medals
Men's basketball
Representing Croatia
FIBA Europe Under-20 Championship Division B
Silver medal – second place	2017 Romania	National U-20 Team
FIBA Europe Under-20 Championship
Silver medal – second place	2018 Germany	National U-20 Team

Karlo Uljarević (born November 20, 1998) is a Croatian professional basketball player who plays for Jazine Arbanasi in the Croatian second-tier First Men's Basketball League. Standing at 1.90 cm, he plays at both guard positions.
