= Darko Talić =

Bosnian basketball player (born 1998)

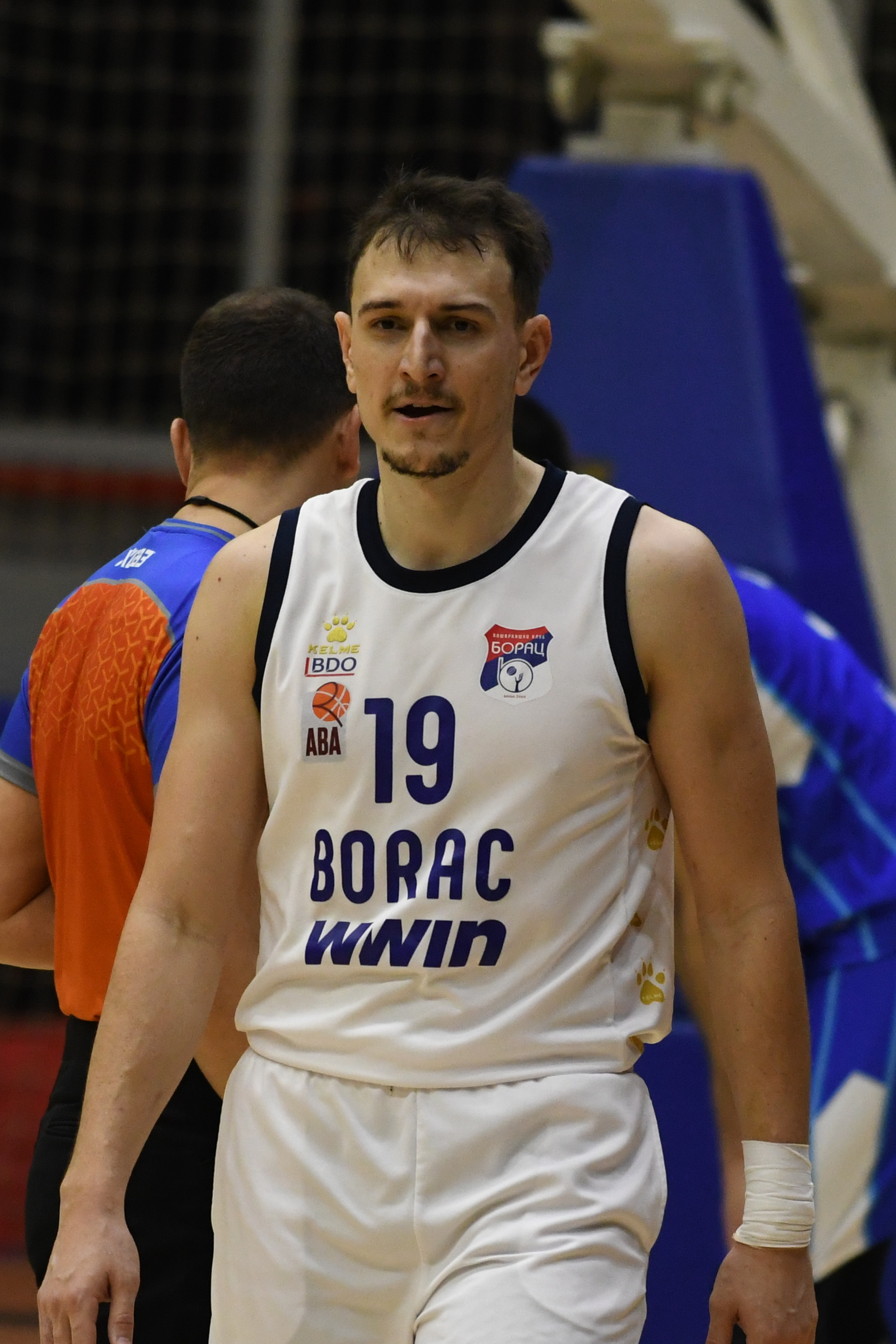
- Talić with Borac Banja Luka in 2026

No. 19 – Bosna
- Position: Point guard
- League: Bosnian League; ABA League; EuroCup

Personal information
- Born: 23 February 1998 (age 28) Banja Luka, Bosnia and Herzegovina
- Listed height: 1.92 m (6 ft 4 in)

Career information
- NBA draft: 2020: undrafted
- Playing career: 2015–present

Career history
- 2015–2023: Igokea
- 2017–2018: → Kakanj
- 2018–2019: → Vogošća
- 2023–2024: Borac Čačak
- 2024–2026: Borac Banja Luka
- 2026–present: Bosna

Career highlights
- 4× Bosnian League champion (2016, 2017, 2022, 2023); 6× Bosnian Cup winner (2016, 2017, 2019, 2021–2023)

Darko Talić (born 23 February 1998) is a Bosnian professional basketball player for Bosna of the Bosnian League, the ABA League, and the EuroCup. Standing at 1.92 m (6 ft 3 1/2 in), he plays the point guard position.

== Club career ==
In July 2015, Talić joined the training camp of the Bosnian team Igokea in order to make the final roster. He eventually made the roster and debuted for the team on October 2, in a 67–56 loss to Cedevita Zagreb, Round 1 game of the ABA League. In the summer of 2017 he was sent on a loan to Kakanj in order to get more experience.

On July 20, 2026, Talić signed with Bosna of the Bosnian League and the Adriatic League.
