= Miron Ruina =

Finnish-Israeli basketball player

Miron Ben Ruina מירון בן רוינה
No. 7 – Hapoel Ironi Eilat
- Position: Power forward / center
- League: Israeli Basketball Premier League

Personal information
- Born: March 25, 1998 (age 28) Helsinki, Finland
- Listed height: 2.03 m (6 ft 8 in)
- Listed weight: 103 kg (227 lb)

Career information
- Playing career: 2016–present

Career history
- 2016–2017: Hapoel Kfar Saba
- 2017–2019: Hapoel Galil Elyon
- 2019–2020: Elitzur Yavne
- 2020–2022: Hapoel Ironi Eilat
- 2022–2023: Hapoel Gilboa Galil
- 2023–2024: Hapoel Galil Elyon
- 2024–2025: Hapoel Tel Aviv
- 2025–present: Hapoel Ironi Eilat

Career highlights
- EuroCup champion (2025)
Medals
Men's basketball
Representing Israel
FIBA Europe Under-20 Championship
Gold medal – first place	2018 Germany	Team
Silver medal – second place	2017 Greece	Team
FIBA Europe Under-18 Championship
Silver medal – second place	2015	Team

Miron Ben Ruina (Hebrew: מירון בן רוינה; born March 25, 1998) is an Israeli-Finnish professional basketball player for Hapoel Ironi Eilat of the Israeli Basketball Premier League. He plays the power forward and center positions.

== Biography ==
Ruina was born in Helsinki, Finland. His father is Israeli, and his mother is Finnish. He moved to Israel with his family shortly after he was born. He is 6 ft 8 in (203 cm) tall, and weighs 230 pounds (100 kg).

== Professional career ==
He played for Hapoel Kfar Saba (2016–17), Hapoel Galil Elyon (2017–19), and Elitzur Yavne (2019–20).

Ruina played for Hapoel Eilat in the Israeli Basketball Premier League from 2019 to 2022. In 2019–20 in seven games he averaged 8.9 minutes, 3.0 points, and 2.1 rebounds per game.

In 2020–21 in 31 games he averaged 9.8 minutes, 2.0 points, and 2.4 rebounds per game, while shooting 53.2% from the floor.

In 2021–22 in 26 games he averaged 14.7 minutes, 3.8 points, and 3.3 rebounds per game, while shooting 51.3% from the floor.

On July 13, 2022, he signed with Hapoel Gilboa Galil of the Israeli Basketball Premier League. In 2022–23 in 19 games he averaged 12.7 minutes, 2.1 points, and 2.4 rebounds per game.

Playing for Hapoel Galil Elyon, in 2023–24 in 30 games he averaged 19.7 minutes, 5.18 points, and 5.9 rebounds per game, while shooting 54.2% from the floor.

Playing for Hapoel Tel Aviv, in 2024–25 in 13 games he averaged 4.0 minutes, 1.4 points, and 1.0 rebounds per game, winning the EuroCup.

Playing for Maccabi Ra'anana, in 2025–26 in 5 games he averaged 4.8 minutes and 1.4 rebounds per game.

In 2026-27 he is again playing for Hapoel Eilat in the Israeli Basketball Premier League.

== Israeli national team ==
He played for the Israeli national basketball team in the 2014 U16 FIBA European Championship Men, the 2015 FIBA U18 European Championship Men (winning a silver medal), the 2016 FIBA U18 European Championship, the 2017 FIBA U20 European Championship (silver medal), and the 2018 FIBA U20 European Championship (gold medal).
