= Johannes Bureus =

Swedish antiquarian, polymath and mystic

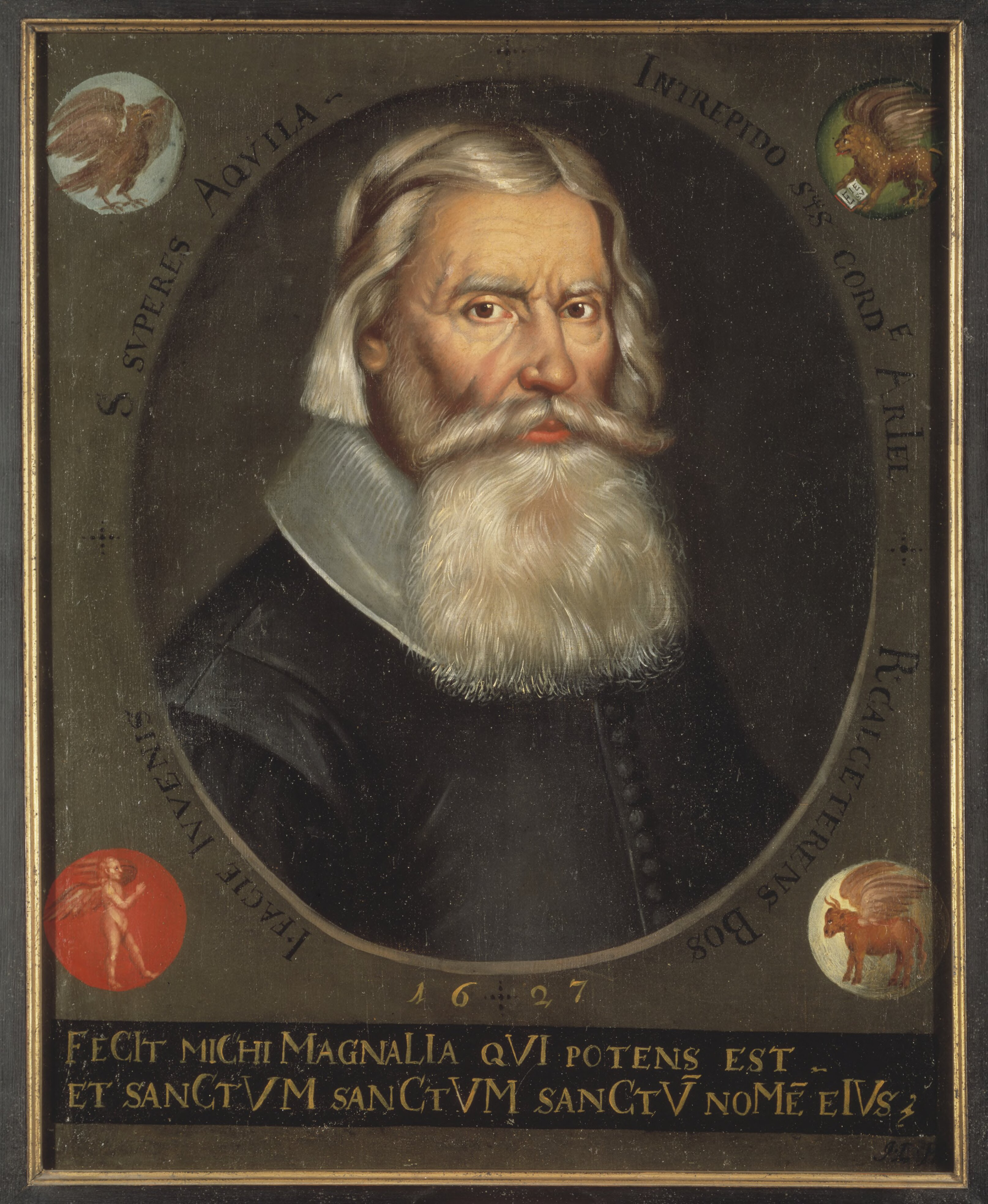
Johannes Bureus on a painting from 1627, signed "J. L.", Gripsholm Castle.

Johannes Thomae Bureus Agrivillensis (born Johan Bure; 1568–1652) was a Swedish polymath, antiquarian, mystic, royal librarian, poet, and tutor and adviser of King Gustavus Adolphus of Sweden. He is a well-known exponent of Gothicism.

== Life and career ==
Bureus was born in 1568 in Åkerby near Uppsala – where the largest and last of the pagan temples once was – in Sweden, as a son of a Lutheran parish priest. He was Sweden's first national antiquarian (riksantikvarie) and first head of Sweden's national library (riksbibliotekarie). He was also the first to document runes. He has been called the father of the Swedish grammar. In 1599, he designed the coats of arms of Helsinki and Uusimaa.

Bureus combined his runic and esoteric interests in his own runic system, which he called the "Adalruna". He was interested in the Rosicrucian manifestos. Contemporary mystics such as Jakob Böhme have studied his works. In 1611, Bureus published the first ever ABC book written in – and about – the Swedish language, Svenska ABC boken medh runor, using the runic alphabet and Latin script. He also wrote a genealogy of the Bure family, partly using runestones as sources.
