= Nolbystenen =

Coordinates: 62.2919°N 17.3609°E

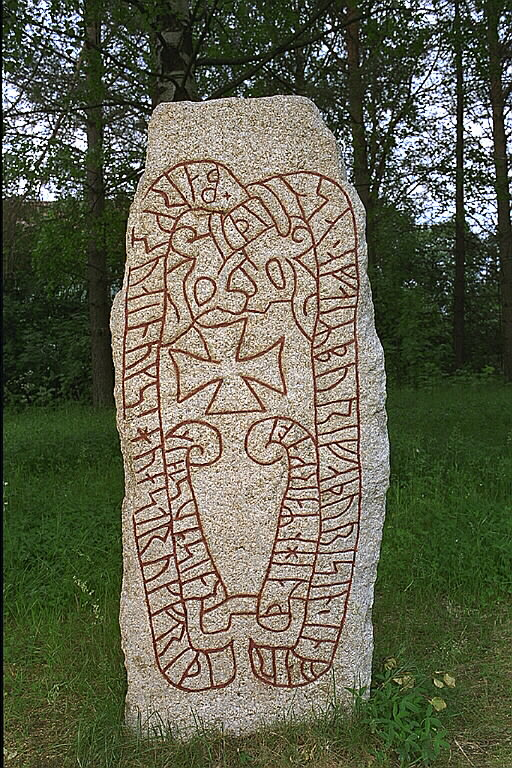
- Writing: Younger Futhark
- Created: c. 1020-1050
- Discovered: Nolby, Medelpad, Sweden
- Rundata ID: M 1
- Style: Pr 1
- Runemaster: Fartägn

Burestenen (English: Bure's Stone), or Nolbystenen, listed in Rundata as M 1, is a memorial runestone located in the Swedish province of Medelpad.

== Description ==
Burestenen is located in the Kvissle-Nolby-Prästbolet region near the Ljungan's outlet into the Gulf of Bothnia, south of Sundsvall. The area has a unique concentration of historic and prehistoric artifacts. Burestenen lies beside the ruins of a manor chapel from the Early Middle Ages. Also in the vicinity is a collection of Viking Age graves and twelve large tumuli from the Swedish Migration Period, of which one is Norrland's largest.

In addition to its runic inscription, it has some crosses marking the Christianization of the 11th century Medelpad. Based on its animal ornamentation, it is classified as being in Ringerike style, runestone style Pr1, dated to c. 1020–1050. The inscription is signed by the runemaster Fartägn.

== Inscription ==
A transliteration, and transcription in Old West Norse and Old East Norse:

× barksuain uk sihuastr uk friþi raistu stain ¶ þinsa ' aftiʀ buri faþur isin ' in farþaihn markaþi
{} Bergsveinn ok Sigfastr ok Friði reistu stein {} þenna {} eptir Búri(?)/Býri(?), fǫður sinn. {} En Farþegn markaði.
{} Bergsvæinn ok Sigfastr ok Friði ræistu stæin {} þennsa {} æftiʀ Buri(?)/Byri(?), faður sinn. {} En Farþegn markaði.
Bergsveinn and Sigfastr and Friði raised this stone in memory of Búrir(?)/Býrir(?), their father. And Farþegn marked.

== See also ==
- Bure kinship
- List of runestones
- Runic alphabet
