= 2026 FIBA Under-17 Basketball World Cup squads =

This article shows the rosters of all participating teams at the 2026 FIBA Under-17 Basketball World Cup in Turkey.

Squad was announced on FIBA website.

== Group A ==
=== France ===
France men's national under-17 basketball team roster
Players
Coaches

Pos.	No.	Name	Age – Date of birth	Height	Club	Ctr.
PG	1	Sohan Boungo	17 – 24 March 2009	1.90 m (6 ft 3 in)	(France) Bcm Gravelines Dunkerque
PG	2	Amadou Fall	17 – 27 January 2009	1.93 m (6 ft 4 in)	(France) Cholet Basket
G/F	3	Melvyn Vounang	17 – 3 June 2009	2.01 m (6 ft 7 in)	(France) Paris Basketball
C	6	Sven Ngom	17 – 26 January 2009	2.14 m (7 ft 0 in)	Pôle France
PG	7	Lorenz Sanz	16 – 24 September 2009	1.87 m (6 ft 2 in)	(France) Jda Dijon Basket
SG	10	Dan Boudine	17 – 6 February 2009	1.98 m (6 ft 6 in)	(France) Orleans Loiret Basket
F	14	Nathan Soliman	17 – 14 May 2009	2.04 m (6 ft 8 in)	(France) Nantes Basket Hermine
F	24	Messi Yangala	17 – 21 June 2009	2.03 m (6 ft 8 in)	Pôle France
F	31	Brandon Muela	17 – 7 May 2009	2.03 m (6 ft 8 in)	Pôle France
PG	60	Devon Agot Fortes Vieira	17 – 20 March 2009	1.87 m (6 ft 2 in)	(France) Sqbb- Jsc
PG	79	Aaron Towo-Nansi	17 – 4 March 2009	1.78 m (5 ft 10 in)	(France) Cholet Basket
G/F	93	Yohan Bassoumba	16 – 18 December 2009	2.00 m (6 ft 7 in)	(France) Caen Basket Calvados

Head coach

Tony Parker

Assistant coach(es)

Dounia Issa
Benjamin Berkani
Old Ahmadou Lo

=== Italy ===
Italy men's national under-17 basketball team roster
Players
Coaches

Pos.	No.	Name	Age – Date of birth	Height	Club	Ctr.
PG	1	Jacopo Vogogna	17 – 24 January 2009	1.94 m (6 ft 4 in)	(Italy) Olimpia Milano
SG	2	Leonardo Nicolodi	16 – 10 November 2009	1.98 m (6 ft 6 in)	(Italy) Olimpia Milano
F	4	Lapo Santini	16 – 24 October 2009	2.02 m (6 ft 8 in)	(Italy) Orange 1 Basket Bassano
F	8	Mattia Ruggeri	17 – 11 April 2009	2.05 m (6 ft 9 in)	(Italy) Basket Santarcangelo Ssdrl
SG	10	Simone Ventura	17 – 6 June 2009	1.99 m (6 ft 6 in)	(Italy) Acqua S.Bernardo Cantu
PG	11	Cristian Malano	17 – 30 January 2009	1.89 m (6 ft 2 in)	(Italy) Vis 2008 Ferrara
G	13	Farid Compaore	16 – 21 May 2010	1.96 m (6 ft 5 in)	(Italy) Olimpia Milano
F	16	Andrea Chouenkam	16 – 19 September 2009	2.03 m (6 ft 8 in)	(Italy) Olimpia Milano
PG	19	Nicolo Ronci	16 – 19 July 2009	1.94 m (6 ft 4 in)	(Italy) Basket Santarcangelo Ssdrl
PG	22	Lorenzo Zotti Pavlovic	16 – 22 July 2009	1.88 m (6 ft 2 in)	(Italy) Acqua S.Bernardo Cantu
F	44	Federico Bagordo	16 – 8 October 2009	2.03 m (6 ft 8 in)	(Italy) Acqua S.Bernardo Cantu
PG	68	Mario Machetti	17 – 13 April 2009	1.85 m (6 ft 1 in)	(Italy) Aquila Basket Trento

Head coach

Michele Catalani

Assistant coach(es)

Vanni Talpo
Carlo Campigotto

=== Japan ===
Japan men's national under-17 basketball team roster
Players
Coaches

Pos.	No.	Name	Age – Date of birth	Height	Club	Ctr.
PG	4	Eishin Konno	17 – 5 January 2009	1.91 m (6 ft 3 in)	(Japan) Meisei High School
SG	5	Jurai Yamamoto	16 – 17 July 2009	1.99 m (6 ft 6 in)	(Japan) Fukuoka Ohori High School
PG	6	Hiroto Kuga	16 – 7 September 2009	1.86 m (6 ft 1 in)	(Japan) Fukuoka Daiichi High School
PG	7	Tetta Sakurai	17 – 6 February 2009	1.80 m (5 ft 11 in)	(Japan) Ohori Senior High School
PG	8	Keiji Koshi	17 – 6 May 2009	1.63 m (5 ft 4 in)	(United States) Concordia Lutheran School
PG	9	Kuon Sato	16 – 21 December 2009	1.80 m (5 ft 11 in)	(Japan) Higashiyama High School
PG	10	Shunsuke Miyazato	16 – 26 August 2009	1.79 m (5 ft 10 in)	(Japan) Ryukyu Golden Kings U18
G	11	Goodluckchinedu Ihetu	16 – 18 March 2010	1.95 m (6 ft 5 in)	(Japan) Kaishi Kokusai High School
PG	13	Fumiya Kurimoto	16 – 25 December 2009	1.88 m (6 ft 2 in)	(Japan) Ohori Senior High School
G	15	Chusonjakku Shiratani	17 – 29 April 2009	1.94 m (6 ft 4 in)	(Japan) Ohori Senior High School
PG	16	Herojabez Kato	16 – 21 October 2009	1.89 m (6 ft 2 in)	(Japan) Chubu University Daiichi High School
SG	17	Rikuto Isoda	15 – 31 August 2010	1.97 m (6 ft 6 in)	(Japan) Yokohama B-Corsairs U18

Head coach

Sota Katamine

Assistant coach(es)

Yasushi Narita
Shinji Tomiyama

=== United States ===
United States men's national under-17 basketball team roster
Players
Coaches

Pos.	No.	Name	Age – Date of birth	Height	Club	Ctr.
PG	4	NaVorro Bowman Jr	17 – 3 June 2009	1.90 m (6 ft 3 in)	(United States) Notre Dame H.S.
SG	5	Asa Montgomery	16 – 20 July 2009	1.98 m (6 ft 6 in)	(United States) Hillgrove Hs
PG	6	Cayden Daughtry	17 – 10 April 2009	1.78 m (5 ft 10 in)	(United States) Calvary Christian
SG	7	Mason Collins	16 – 20 August 2009	1.98 m (6 ft 6 in)	(United States) Irmo Highschool
G	8	Jordan Page	17 – 5 May 2009	1.96 m (6 ft 5 in)	(United States) Broughton Magnet High School
F	9	AJ Williams	16 – 28 June 2009	2.03 m (6 ft 8 in)	(United States) Eagles Landing High School
F	10	Xavier Young	16 – 4 March 2010	2.05 m (6 ft 9 in)	(United States) Faith Family Academy
PG	11	JJ Crawford	16 – 5 June 2010	1.93 m (6 ft 4 in)	(United States) Rainier Beach Hs
PG	12	Beckham Black	17 – 30 January 2009	1.88 m (6 ft 2 in)	(United States) Southeastern Prep Academy
F/C	13	Joaquim Boumtje Boumtje	17 – 30 May 2009	2.11 m (6 ft 11 in)	(Spain) FC Barcelona
F	14	CJ Rosser	17 – 21 April 2009	2.06 m (6 ft 9 in)	(United States) Northern Nash High School
F/C	15	Erick Dampier Jr	16 – 22 October 2009	2.08 m (6 ft 10 in)	(United States) Madison-Ridgeland High School

Head coach

Scott Fitch

Assistant coach(es)

Nick Logalbo
Frank Bennett

== Group B ==
=== Cameroon ===
Cameroon men's national under-17 basketball team roster
Players
Coaches

Pos.	No.	Name	Age – Date of birth	Height	Club	Ctr.
PG	0	Edwin Mbakop Djia	15 – 21 June 2011	1.78 m (5 ft 10 in)	(France) Sluc Nancy Basket
PG	1	Liam Levit Ngameni Fopissie	17 – 10 May 2009	1.85 m (6 ft 1 in)	(Canada) Kainos Basketball Academy
PG	2	Marvyn Bidjel	15 – 11 December 2010	1.90 m (6 ft 3 in)	(Cameroon) Vikings Basketball Academy
PG	4	Lenny Nouhet-Epesse Titi	17 – 28 March 2009	1.80 m (5 ft 11 in)	(France) Jsa Bordeaux
PG	6	Nolan Ngangmeni	17 – 11 April 2009	1.88 m (6 ft 2 in)	(France) Saint-Charles Charenton Saint-Maurice Basket-Ball
PG	7	Felix Deumi	17 – 16 March 2009	1.90 m (6 ft 3 in)	(Cameroon) Marie Claire Noah Academy
G/F	8	Mateo N'Koumngock	17 – 2 February 2009	1.98 m (6 ft 6 in)	(Canada) Royal Crown Academic School
SF	11	Jason Essoua	15 – 1 August 2010	2.00 m (6 ft 7 in)	(France) Boulazac Basket Dordogne
G/F	12	Yuma Mendoua Ze	17 – 10 January 2009	1.97 m (6 ft 6 in)	(France) Basket Club Liévinois
SG	22	Joshua Kamga Tonkam	17 – 9 June 2009	1.95 m (6 ft 5 in)	(France) Boulogne-Levallois Metropolitans
G	23	Lenny Djoumna	17 – 22 February 2009	1.92 m (6 ft 4 in)	(France) Nanterre 92
SF	34	Brice Pounouko	15 – 22 September 2010	2.00 m (6 ft 7 in)	(Italy) Unibasket Lanciano Ssdarl

Head coach

Parfait Bitee Moto

Assistant coach(es)

Augustin Mouele
Franck Oscar Moukouri Nsai

=== Canada ===
Canada men's national under-17 basketball team roster
Players
Coaches

Pos.	No.	Name	Age – Date of birth	Height	Club	Ctr.
G/F	0	Isaiah Clarke	16 – 30 July 2009	1.98 m (6 ft 6 in)	(Canada) Triple Balance
PG	1	Kenyon St. Louis	16 – 19 October 2009	1.88 m (6 ft 2 in)	Canada Elite
G/F	2	Isaiah Hamilton	16 – 27 October 2009	1.98 m (6 ft 6 in)	(Canada) Crestwood Preparatory College
SG	3	Jordan Fisher	17 – 25 April 2009	1.96 m (6 ft 5 in)	(United States) Dream City Christian School
G/F	4	Kingston Thomas	17 – 28 May 2009	1.97 m (6 ft 6 in)	(United States) La Lumiere School
PG	5	Praise Badejo	16 – 9 March 2010	1.85 m (6 ft 1 in)	(Canada) King Heights Academy
SF	11	Grady Kapuanya	16 – 23 July 2009	2.00 m (6 ft 7 in)	(Canada) Fort Erie International Academy
PG	12	Liam Mitakaro	17 – 20 March 2009	1.88 m (6 ft 2 in)	(United States) Iowa United
G	15	Noah D'Acre	17 – 30 March 2009	1.93 m (6 ft 4 in)	(Canada) Orangeville Prep
SF	23	Tristan Edwards	17 – 23 June 2009	2.00 m (6 ft 7 in)	(United States) Img Academy
C	34	Jeremy Gohier	15 – 5 November 2010	2.29 m (7 ft 6 in)	(Canada) Nobel Elite
PF	50	Kurtis Baumann	17 – 12 April 2009	2.08 m (6 ft 10 in)	(Canada) Orangeville Prep

Head coach

Chris Cheng

Assistant coach(es)

Dan Vanhooren
Brad Campbell

=== China ===
China men's national under-17 basketball team roster
Players
Coaches

Pos.	No.	Name	Age – Date of birth	Height	Club	Ctr.
PG	5	Minghao Shi	16 – 13 October 2009	1.85 m (6 ft 1 in)	(China) Zhejiang Chouzhou Club
PG	6	Yuxiu Chen	17 – 21 January 2009	1.85 m (6 ft 1 in)	(China) Zhejiang Guangsha Basketball Club
PG	8	Yuchen Zhang	16 – 3 March 2010	1.86 m (6 ft 1 in)	(China) The High School Attached To Tsinghua University
PG	9	Hanzhi Tu	16 – 12 September 2009	1.91 m (6 ft 3 in)	(China) Sichuan Mianyang Nanshan High School
G	11	Chunzhi Zhang	17 – 5 March 2009	1.94 m (6 ft 4 in)	(China) Fujian Xunxing Basketball Club
G/F	12	Feiyan Lyu	16 – 1 May 2010	1.98 m (6 ft 6 in)	(China) The High School Attached To Tsinghua University
F	13	Yizhaojie Zhang	16 – 31 March 2010	2.03 m (6 ft 8 in)	(China) Shanghai Jiushi Club
PF	14	Ziyi Zhang	16 – 21 April 2010	2.08 m (6 ft 10 in)	(China) Shanghai Jiushi Club
C	15	Boxin Zhao	15 – 1 August 2010	2.15 m (7 ft 1 in)	(China) The High School Attached To Tsinghua University
SF	16	Xuanyu Liu	15 – 28 August 2010	2.00 m (6 ft 7 in)	(China) Guangdong Experimental High School
F	17	Fangyu Xie	15 – 13 September 2010	2.05 m (6 ft 9 in)	(China) Zhangqiu No. 4 High School
F/C	18	Jiaze Yao	16 – 29 March 2010	2.10 m (6 ft 11 in)	(China) Guangdong Hongyuan Club

Head coach

Jianjun Wang

Assistant coach(es)

Nikola Markovic
Qin Yang

=== Lithuania ===
Lithuania men's national under-17 basketball team roster
Players
Coaches

Pos.	No.	Name	Age – Date of birth	Height	Club	Ctr.
PG	0	Kristupas Sabeckas	17 – 15 May 2009	1.86 m (6 ft 1 in)	(Lithuania) Žalgiris Academy
F	1	Arnas Erlickis	17 – 2 January 2009	2.02 m (6 ft 8 in)	(Lithuania) Klaipédos Km
G/F	2	Joris Sinica	17 – 30 January 2009	1.98 m (6 ft 6 in)	(Lithuania) Žalgiris Academy
PG	5	Vytis Sliogeris	16 – 27 November 2009	1.80 m (5 ft 11 in)	(Lithuania) Kauno Krepšinio Mokykla "Perkūnas"
G/F	7	Paulius Veliulis	17 – 16 January 2009	1.98 m (6 ft 6 in)	(Lithuania) Vsi Siauliu Krepsinio Akademijia Saule
SF	11	Benas Birzinis	17 – 13 January 2009	2.00 m (6 ft 7 in)	(Lithuania) Sostinės Krepšinio Mokykla
G	12	Jokubas Kukta	17 – 6 April 2009	1.93 m (6 ft 4 in)	(Lithuania) Žalgiris Academy
G	13	Rojus Stankevicius	17 – 13 May 2009	1.93 m (6 ft 4 in)	(Lithuania) Vsi Siauliu Krepsinio Akademijia Saule
G/F	14	Simas Rascius	16 – 5 September 2009	1.99 m (6 ft 6 in)	(Lithuania) Sostinės Krepšinio Mokykla
PG	21	Lukas Siskauskas	17 – 3 March 2009	1.81 m (5 ft 11 in)	(United States) St. Joseph High School
SG	35	Gabrielius Buivydas	17 – 28 March 2009	1.95 m (6 ft 5 in)	(Lithuania) Vilniaus Miesto Krepšinio Mokykla
PG	99	Augustas Kicas	16 – 27 July 2009	1.78 m (5 ft 10 in)	(Lithuania) Nacionalinė Krepšinio Akademija

Head coach

Tomas Tarasevicius

Assistant coach(es)

Eligijus Vaitekunas
Matas Juzeliunas

== Group C ==
=== New Zealand ===
New Zealand men's national under-17 basketball team roster
Players
Coaches

Pos.	No.	Name	Age – Date of birth	Height	Club	Ctr.
SG	0	Jayden Cecil	17 – 23 February 2009	1.95 m (6 ft 5 in)	(United States) Utah Prep
PG	1	Lawson Pryor	17 – 8 March 2009	1.91 m (6 ft 3 in)	(New Zealand) Basketball Auckland
SF	3	Liam Keogh	17 – 23 June 2009	2.01 m (6 ft 7 in)	(Australia) Victoria State
F	4	Noah Duncan	17 – 17 May 2009	2.03 m (6 ft 8 in)	(New Zealand) Auckland Tuatara
PG	5	Jackson Couper	17 – 21 February 2009	1.88 m (6 ft 2 in)	(New Zealand) Waitakere West Auckland Basketball
PG	7	Tawhiri Cate	17 – 20 February 2009	1.91 m (6 ft 3 in)	(New Zealand) Canterbury Rams
C	8	Zach Rampton	17 – 16 April 2009	2.13 m (7 ft 0 in)	(New Zealand) Nelson Giants
SG	9	Daley Pohio	17 – 25 June 2009	1.95 m (6 ft 5 in)	(New Zealand) Auckland Tuatara
F/C	11	William Patten	16 – 1 November 2009	2.10 m (6 ft 11 in)	(New Zealand) Canterbury Rams
F	12	Marco Sula	17 – 8 January 2009	2.03 m (6 ft 8 in)	(New Zealand) Canterbury Rams
SF	20	Malakai Tuimalealiifano	15 – 2 July 2010	2.00 m (6 ft 7 in)	(New Zealand) Rotorua Basketball Association
PG	35	Matayas Thomson	17 – 3 April 2009	1.83 m (6 ft 0 in)	(New Zealand) Auckland Basketball

Head coach

Darron Larsen

Assistant coach(es)

Greg Brockbank
Igor Cvjetkovic

=== Puerto Rico ===
Puerto Rico men's national under-17 basketball team roster
Players
Coaches

Pos.	No.	Name	Age – Date of birth	Height	Club	Ctr.
PG	0	Jodereck Torres	17 – 2 February 2009	1.85 m (6 ft 1 in)	(United States) Miami Christian Academy
PG	1	Jeremy Willmore	17 – 7 February 2009	1.83 m (6 ft 0 in)	(United States) Balboa Academy
PG	2	Dwight Gaines	17 – 23 April 2009	1.78 m (5 ft 10 in)	(United States) Westminster Academy
PG	3	Jomar Alejandro Rodriguez Rivera	16 – 22 December 2009	1.91 m (6 ft 3 in)	(Puerto Rico) Colegio San Antonio
PG	5	Eduyn Albino	16 – 15 July 2009	1.88 m (6 ft 2 in)	(Puerto Rico) Masis School
G/F	10	Ivaniel Lopez Arache	16 – 20 February 2010	1.98 m (6 ft 6 in)	(Puerto Rico) Academia Presbiteriana
PG	11	John Arroyo	17 – 11 June 2009	1.91 m (6 ft 3 in)	(United States) The Academy Of Central Florida
SG	12	Alexis Fuentes	16 – 2 December 2009	1.96 m (6 ft 5 in)	(United States) Bcat
SG	13	Yaddiel Sanchez	16 – 23 August 2009	1.96 m (6 ft 5 in)	(United States) The Academy Of Central Florida
PG	15	Michael Portilla	16 – 24 August 2009	1.80 m (5 ft 11 in)	(Puerto Rico) Guamani Private School
G/F	20	Darell Rodriguez	17 – 27 January 2009	1.98 m (6 ft 6 in)	(Puerto Rico) Academia Cristo Rey
SG	21	Luis Rosado	17 – 29 April 2009	1.96 m (6 ft 5 in)	(United States) Robbinsville High School

Head coach

Orlando Pantoja

Assistant coach(es)

Daniel Ortiz
Louis Vidot

=== Slovenia ===
Slovenia men's national under-17 basketball team roster
Players
Coaches

Pos.	No.	Name	Age – Date of birth	Height	Club	Ctr.
SG	4	Hugo Rene Godec	17 – 2 January 2009	1.95 m (6 ft 5 in)	(Slovenia) KK Jance
SG	5	Aleks Pejic Rupnik	17 – 26 April 2009	1.95 m (6 ft 5 in)	(Slovenia) Gorica
PG	6	Nejc Slapnik	17 – 22 April 2009	1.90 m (6 ft 3 in)	(Slovenia) Ece Triglav
G/F	7	Jakob Siftar	17 – 3 February 2009	1.98 m (6 ft 6 in)	(Spain) FC Barcelona
PG	8	Maj Tomsic Vujkovic	16 – 19 April 2010	1.90 m (6 ft 3 in)	(Slovenia) KK Ilirija
G/F	9	Nejc Pirnat	16 – 15 December 2009	1.97 m (6 ft 6 in)	(Slovenia) KK Grosuplje
G	10	Maks Anderlic	17 – 5 May 2009	1.94 m (6 ft 4 in)	(Slovenia) KK Ilirija
SF	11	Jaka Jovanovic	17 – 29 April 2009	2.00 m (6 ft 7 in)	(Slovenia) Zlatorog Lasko
SG	12	Matic Rezec	17 – 9 January 2009	1.96 m (6 ft 5 in)	(Slovenia) Zlatorog Lasko
F	13	Lun Jarc	17 – 26 January 2009	2.07 m (6 ft 9 in)	(Serbia) Mega Mis
G/F	14	Rok Ilic	16 – 6 December 2009	1.99 m (6 ft 6 in)	(Slovenia) Cedevita Olimpija
F	15	Nejc Roznik	17 – 11 June 2009	2.04 m (6 ft 8 in)	(Slovenia) Cedevita Olimpija

Head coach

Gregor Gornjec

Assistant coach(es)

Marko Irgolic
Zan Pevec Glavan

=== Türkiye ===
Türkiye men's national under-17 basketball team roster
Players
Coaches

Pos.	No.	Name	Age – Date of birth	Height	Club
F	1	Demir Öztürk	17 – 16 February 2009	2.02 m (6 ft 8 in)	(Turkey) Anadolu Efes SK
G/F	2	Darius Karutasu	17 – 30 March 2009	2.01 m (6 ft 7 in)	(Turkey) Anadolu Efes SK
F/C	4	Rüzgar Öpçün	16 – 4 November 2009	2.11 m (6 ft 11 in)	(Turkey) Fenerbahçe Beko
F	5	Beşir Briant	16 – 12 October 2009	2.05 m (6 ft 9 in)	(Turkey) Karsiyaka
F	8	Arda Öztürk	16 – 8 June 2010	2.04 m (6 ft 8 in)	(Turkey) Anadolu Efes SK
PG	10	Ömer Kutluay	17 – 27 March 2009	1.93 m (6 ft 4 in)	(Spain) Real Madrid
G	11	Kartal Bora Şimşek	17 – 26 January 2009	1.95 m (6 ft 5 in)	(Turkey) Bahcesehir Koleji
PG	13	Ömer Yusuf Şık	17 – 15 April 2009	1.90 m (6 ft 3 in)	(Turkey) Fenerbahçe Beko
F	16	Atahan Ağaçdelen	17 – 20 May 2009	2.02 m (6 ft 8 in)	(Turkey) Aliaga Petkimspor
G/F	17	Noyan Tolan	17 – 9 March 2009	2.00 m (6 ft 7 in)	(Spain) Valencia Basket Club Sad
PG	24	Sarp Kaya Arda	16 – 24 July 2009	1.82 m (6 ft 0 in)	(United States) University Of Vermont
SG	41	Emre Yazıcı	17 – 7 April 2009	1.97 m (6 ft 6 in)	(Turkey) Aliaga Petkimspor

Head coach

Hasan Özmeriç

Assistant coach(es)

Nehir Berk
Elvir Kurtoğlu

== Group D ==
=== Australia ===
Australia men's national under-17 basketball team roster
Players
Coaches

Pos.	No.	Name	Age – Date of birth	Height	Club	Ctr.
PG	4	Andrew Watene	16 – 15 August 2009	1.85 m (6 ft 1 in)	(Australia) Queensland State
PG	5	Tom Dammers	17 – 27 March 2009	1.87 m (6 ft 2 in)	(Australia) Victoria State
SG	6	Josh McCann	16 – 29 July 2009	1.96 m (6 ft 5 in)	(Australia) Victoria State
G/F	7	Luke Paul	17 – 20 February 2009	1.98 m (6 ft 6 in)	(Australia) Cairns Taipans
G	9	Antonio Browne	16 – 20 September 2009	1.93 m (6 ft 4 in)	(Australia) Centre Of Excellence
G	10	Lucas Byrne	16 – 20 November 2009	1.92 m (6 ft 4 in)	(Australia) Victoria State
SG	11	William Hamilton	17 – 26 April 2009	1.96 m (6 ft 5 in)	(Australia) Centre Of Excellence
G/F	12	John Aryang	17 – 18 June 2009	1.98 m (6 ft 6 in)	Western Australia
SF	13	Riak Akhuar	16 – 22 November 2009	2.00 m (6 ft 7 in)	(Australia) Victoria State
C	14	Yahya Başaran	17 – 29 May 2009	2.14 m (7 ft 0 in)	(Australia) Centre Of Excellence
F/C	15	Alex Mabbott	17 – 1 March 2009	2.11 m (6 ft 11 in)	(United States) Spire Academy
G/F	31	Alex Edwards	16 – 4 July 2009	1.98 m (6 ft 6 in)	Western Australia

Head coach

Greg Vanderjagt

Assistant coach(es)

Ashley Arnott
Rhys Carter

=== Côte d'Ivoire ===
Côte d'Ivoire men's national under-17 basketball team roster
Players
Coaches

Pos.	No.	Name	Age – Date of birth	Height	Club	Ctr.
PG	0	Tesilan Doumbouya	17 – 20 January 2009	1.90 m (6 ft 3 in)	(Sweden) Bankeryds Basket
SF	1	Barakel Koffi	16 – 10 February 2010	2.00 m (6 ft 7 in)	(Italy) A.Dil. Basket S.Francesco
PG	2	Ibrahim Fadiga	15 – 21 July 2010	1.82 m (6 ft 0 in)	(Italy) A.S.D. Virtus Mansuè
PG	3	Jean-Charles Siransi	16 – 3 May 2010	1.90 m (6 ft 3 in)	(United States) Bellevue College
G	4	Omar Mangassouba	16 – 16 July 2009	1.92 m (6 ft 4 in)	(United States) Bellevue College
G	7	Nathan Djako	15 – 10 December 2010	1.94 m (6 ft 4 in)	(Ivory Coast) Hbuc Basketball
G	8	Mohamed Konan	16 – 8 January 2010	1.92 m (6 ft 4 in)	-
F	10	Jean-Philippe Oka	17 – 2 January 2009	2.03 m (6 ft 8 in)	(United States) Bellevue College
F	12	Ladji Konaté	16 – 12 November 2009	2.04 m (6 ft 8 in)	(Ivory Coast) Jts Fusion
SG	22	Adama Kone	16 – 7 September 2009	1.95 m (6 ft 5 in)	(United States) Bellevue College
PF	32	Raphael Ouedraogo	15 – 5 November 2010	2.08 m (6 ft 10 in)	(United States) Barton College
PG	78	Joris Kouadio	16 – 11 July 2009	1.83 m (6 ft 0 in)	(United States) Bellevue College

Head coach

Eric Anderson Affi

Assistant coach(es)

Kouassi Koffi Roland blé
M’Linzi Ghyldas Bohouo

=== Serbia ===
Serbia men's national under-17 basketball team roster
Players
Coaches

Pos.	No.	Name	Age – Date of birth	Height	Club	Ctr.
G/F	2	Luka Galic	17 – 28 March 2009	1.99 m (6 ft 6 in)	(Bosnia and Herzegovina) Igokea M:Tel
F/C	3	Nikola Durovic	17 – 30 April 2009	2.10 m (6 ft 11 in)	(Serbia) Partizan Nis
PG	7	Vuk Stepanovic	17 – 18 May 2009	1.91 m (6 ft 3 in)	(Serbia) Kk Mega Basket
PG	9	Ognjen Simjanovski	16 – 28 September 2009	1.91 m (6 ft 3 in)	(Serbia) Crvena Zvezda Mts
SF	10	Marko Veselinovic	17 – 22 March 2009	2.00 m (6 ft 7 in)	(Serbia) Crvena Zvezda Mts
F	11	Matija Lukic	16 – 19 October 2009	2.02 m (6 ft 8 in)	(Spain) Casademont Zaragoza
G/F	12	Vaso Saponjic	17 – 28 May 2009	1.97 m (6 ft 6 in)	(Serbia) Bc Cacak 94
PF	18	Luka Miladinovic	16 – 3 October 2009	2.09 m (6 ft 10 in)	(Serbia) Partizan Nis
PF	22	Petar Bjelica	17 – 14 February 2009	2.08 m (6 ft 10 in)	(Serbia) Bc Mega Basket Beograd
F	25	Nikola Kusturica	17 – 30 April 2009	2.02 m (6 ft 8 in)	(Spain) Fc Barcelona
SG	31	Lazar Milicic	16 – 10 July 2009	1.96 m (6 ft 5 in)	(Spain) Pablo Laso Academy
PG	95	Luka Pavlovic	16 – 7 August 2009	1.84 m (6 ft 0 in)	(Serbia) Partizan Nis

Head coach

Stevan Mijovic

Assistant coach(es)

Nikola Nesic
Dejan Dokic

=== Venezuela ===
Venezuela men's national under-17 basketball team roster
Players
Coaches

Pos.	No.	Name	Age – Date of birth	Height	Club	Ctr.
PG	0	Cristhian Jose Perez Rivas	16 – 14 November 2009	1.85 m (6 ft 1 in)	(Venezuela) Club Santa Rosa
PG	3	Julio Vasquez	17 – 1 June 2009	1.90 m (6 ft 3 in)	(Spain) Dreamland Gran Canaria
G	5	Bryan Gomez	17 – 17 January 2009	1.92 m (6 ft 4 in)	(Venezuela) Angeles De Cocuima
SG	7	Kevin Gutierrez	17 – 6 June 2009	1.96 m (6 ft 5 in)	(Italy) Asd Stella Azzurra Brindisi
PG	8	Williams Anillo	16 – 12 September 2009	1.80 m (5 ft 11 in)	(Venezuela) Rider De Baruta
PG	9	Ezequiel Perez	17 – 18 May 2009	1.91 m (6 ft 3 in)	(Spain) La Laguna Tenerife
PG	11	Carlos Perez	16 – 1 August 2009	1.83 m (6 ft 0 in)	(Venezuela) Cocodrilos De Caracas
SG	12	Ricardo Villarroel	17 – 13 January 2009	1.96 m (6 ft 5 in)	(Venezuela) Escuela Jose Arias Eba
PG	15	Chris Manuel Echezuria Duran	15 – 15 January 2011	1.88 m (6 ft 2 in)	(Spain) Pablo Laso Academy
PG	30	Santiago Gines	17 – 14 April 2009	1.91 m (6 ft 3 in)	(Venezuela) Trapichito De Guarenas
PG	34	Samuel Uzcategui	17 – 1 January 2009	1.89 m (6 ft 2 in)	(Australia) Norwood Flames
G/F	47	Enzo Nash Sgherza	16 – 17 December 2009	1.98 m (6 ft 6 in)	(Venezuela) Trotamundos

Head coach

Alexis Cedres

Assistant coach(es)

Nelson Solórzano
Daniel Amado Centeno
Carlos Alfonso Ramirez Gavidia
