= Point Williams =

Point Williams (67°49′S 67°34′E) is a point on the coast of Mac. Robertson Land at the east side of Shallow Bay. It was discovered by the British Australian New Zealand Antarctic Research Expedition (BANZARE) under Mawson on 12 February 1931 and named after A.J. Williams, wireless officer on the Discovery.

== See also ==
- Dingsør Dome
