= Dingsør Dome =

Dingsør Dome (68°1′S 67°43′E) is a small, distinct ice-covered elevation rising inland from the coast, 11 nautical miles (20 km) south of Point Williams, in Mac. Robertson Land. It was discovered in February 1931 by the British Australian and New Zealand Antarctic Research Expedition (1929–31) under Douglas Mawson, and was named by Mawson after Captain Dingsør, a Norwegian whale fishery inspector who was aboard the Kosmos (Captain Hans Andresen) in Antarctica that season. The Kosmos had supplied coal to Mawson's ship, the Discovery, on December 29, 1930.
