= William Soliman =

French basketball player

William Soliman (born 15 February 1980 in Saint Denis, France) is a French basketball player who played 13 games for the France men's national basketball team in 2008. He is the father of Nathan Soliman.
