= Lewis Uvwo =

Nigerian basketball player (born 2008)

Prolific Prep
- Position: Center

Personal information
- Born: March 10, 2008 (age 18) Nigeria
- Listed height: 6 ft 10 in (2.08 m)
- Listed weight: 225 lb (102 kg)

Career information
- High school: Prolific Prep (Fort Lauderdale, Florida)
- College: Providence (commit)

Career history
- 2025: Kriol Star

Lewis Igho Uvwo (born March 10, 2008) is a Nigerian high school basketball player who attends Prolific Prep in Fort Lauderdale, Florida, and is committed playing college basketball for the Providence Friars. He is a five-star recruit and the top-ranked center in the class of 2027.

== Early life ==
Lewis Uvwo was born on March 10, 2008, in Nigeria. Growing up, he was often asked whether he played basketball due to his height. Uvwo finally decided to try the sport a month before his 15th birthday and quickly found success. Just two months later, he was invited to the national under-16 team. Later that year, Uvwo was one of three Nigerian players invited to the FIBA Africa Regional Youth Camp held in Mali, marking the first time he traveled via airplane. His father, Goddy, told The Punch that he "believe[d] God made him to play basketball". Uvwo played for Raptors Academy. He later joined the NBA Academy Africa.

BAL In March 2025, Uvwo signed with Kriol Star of the Basketball Africa League (BAL) ahead of the 2025 BAL season. He joined the team through the BAL Elevate program, which assigns NBA Academy Africa youth players to BAL rosters. Uvwo played a total of 12 seconds in the first four games in the Sahara Conference. He then played limited minutes in their penultimate conference game. On 4 May 2025, Uvwo recorded 14 points, 12 rebounds, and two blocks in a 71–69 overtime win over the defending BAL champion Petro de Luanda to close out conference play. He scored the game-winning lay-up as time expired for the upset victory, which secured Kriol Star a spot in the BAL playoffs. Uvwo appeared in both of their playoff games. He made six total appearances and averaged 4.7 points and four rebounds in 15.7 minutes per game.

== High school career ==
Uvwo moved to the United States to continue his career at Prolific Prep in Fort Lauderdale, Florida, describing its basketball team as "the number one program in the United States". He joined during the 2025–26 season, spending the remainder of the year on the second team.

That offseason, Uvwo joined Nightrydas in the 17U division of the Nike Elite Youth Basketball League (EYBL) circuit. In just his second EYBL game in April, he recorded a near-triple-double with 12 points, 10 rebounds, and nine blocks. Uvwo was described as the "breakout player" of the Nike EYBL Session I. He repeated the feat twice more at the Peach Jam in July, including 10 points, 14 rebounds, and nine blocks in a loss to Drive Nation in the Peach Jam semifinals. Uvwo averaged 11 points, 9.4 rebounds, and six blocks per game at the Peach Jam, leading Nightrydas to a 5–2 record. He was named the inaugural EYBL 17U Defensive Player of the Year after averaging 5.1 blocks per game across the entire circuit.

Uvwo also won co-MVP honors at the 24th annual Pangos All-American Camp (alongside Micah Gordon) in June. He led his team to a perfect 5–0 record before he grabbed a game-high 10 rebounds in the Top 30 Cream of the Crop game. In August, Uvwo won MVP honors at the Adidas ABCD Camp after posting 16 points, eight rebounds, and three blocks in the championship game. It marked the camp's return following a 20-year dormancy.

=== Recruiting ===
Uvwo is a consensus top-10 prospect and the top-ranked center in the class of 2027. He is rated a five-star recruit by ESPN and 247Sports, and a four-star recruit by Rivals.com. Upon his arrival to the U.S., he initially entered the 247Sports rankings in February 2026 as the No. 181 recruit in the class, before a quick adjutment to No. 94. Uvwo jumped to the No. 18 spot in May before moving into the top 10 the following month. His offseason circuit performances in mid-2026 cemented him as a consensus top-10 recruit by July.

Uvwo received offer 30 NCAA Division I offers. In August 2026, he announced his first four official visits: Baylor, California, Kentucky, and Providence. On October 28, 2026, Uvwo verbally committed to playing college basketball at Providence.
