= Beckham Black =

American basketball player (born 2009)

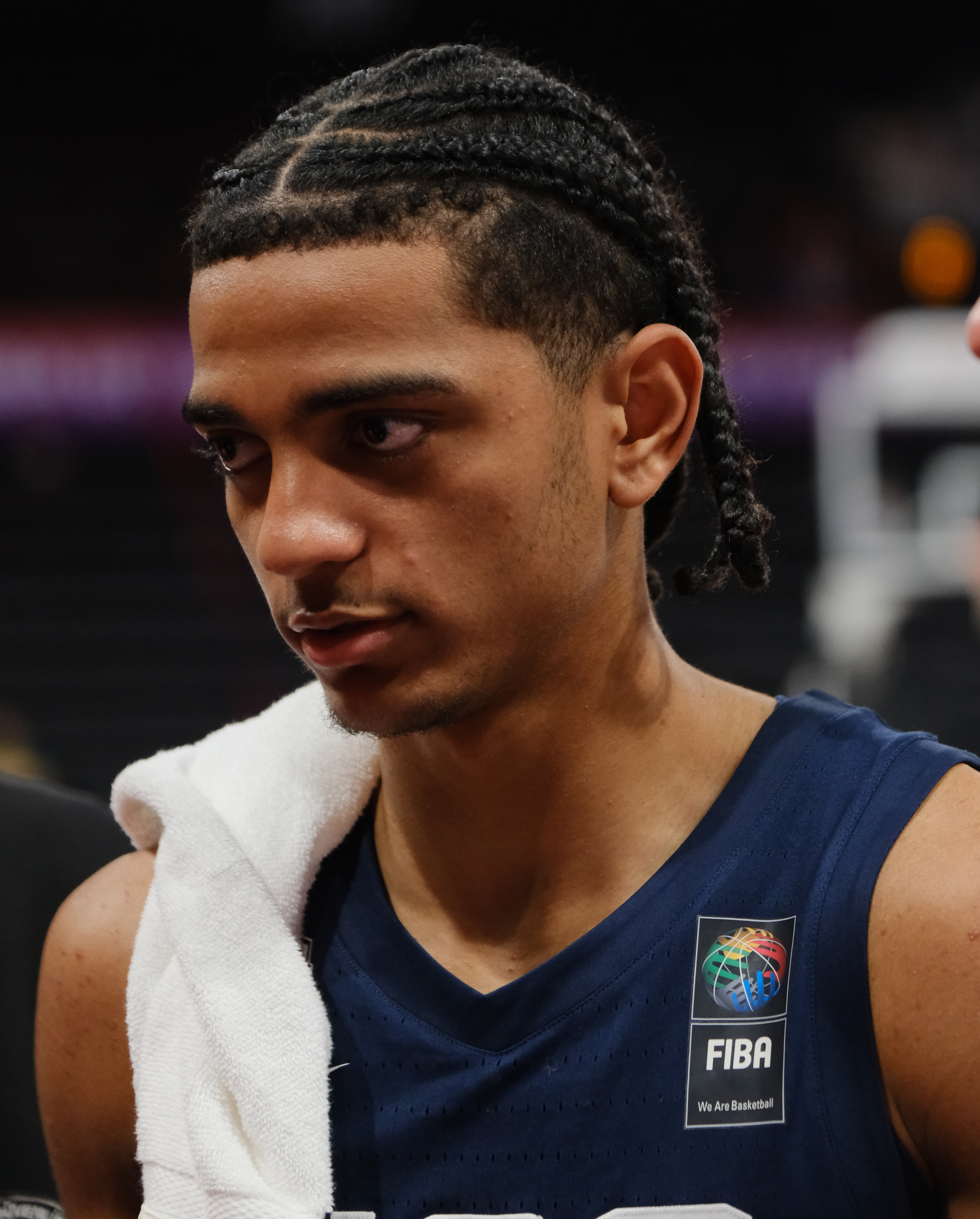
- Black representing the USA in 2026

No. 0 – Southeastern Prep Falcons
- Position: Point guard

Personal information
- Born: January 30, 2009 (age 17)
- Listed height: 6 ft 3 in (1.91 m)
- Listed weight: 180 lb (82 kg)

Career information
- High school: Duncanville (Duncanville, Texas) Southeastern Preparatory Academy (Orlando, Florida)
Medals
Representing the United States
Men's basketball
FIBA Under-17 World Cup
Gold medal – first place	2026 Turkey	Team
FIBA Under-16 AmeriCup
Gold medal – first place	2025 Mexico	Team

Beckham Black (born January 30, 2009) is an American high school basketball player who attends Southeastern Preparatory Academy in Orlando, Florida. Black is a consensus five-star recruit and the No. 1 ranked player in the class of 2027, earning FIBA Under-17 World Cup All-Star Five honors in 2026. He is the younger brother of Orlando Magic guard, Anthony Black, and Oklahoma City Thunder guard, Micah Peavy.

== Early life ==
Black was born on January 30, 2009. He is the younger brother of NBA player Anthony Black. Beckham first attended Duncanville High School in Texas as a freshman and sophomore, before transferring to Southeastern Preparatory Academy in Orlando, Florida in 2025 to move closer to his brother. Black is also the step-son of David Peavy and the younger step-brother of NBA player, Micah Peavy. His step-father was the head coach at Duncanville and Southeastern Prep. CJ Rosser, a fellow five-star 2027 recruit, later transferred to Southeastern Prep to join Black that same year after they played for USA Basketball together in the summer of 2025. Following his junior season, Black was rated as a consensus five-star recruit. He was ranked No. 1 overall in the nation by ESPN and 247Sports following the reclassification of Marcus Spears Jr., and No. 5 by Rivals. In June 2026, Black and Kaleena Smith became the first two high school basketball players to sign merchandising deals with ESPN, doing so through SportsCenter NEXT.

== National team career ==
In October 2024, Black first attended the USA Basketball Junior National Team minicamp in Colorado Springs, Colorado. In June 2025, Black represented United States national team in the FIBA Under-16 AmeriCup in Mexico. He won a gold medal and started all six games, averaging 6.7 points, 6.5 assists and 3.3 steals per game. In June 2026, he represented the United States in the FIBA Under-17 World Cup in Turkey. Beckham again led the United States to a gold medal, and earned All-Star Five honors for the tournament. He was joined by Luke Paul, Ömer Kutluay, Nikola Kusturica and Joaquim Boumtje-Boumtje. Black averaged 12.3 points, 8.3 assists and 3.0 steals per game, while shooting 52.3% from the field and 39.3% from three-point range. His assists ranked second in the World Cup and his steals third overall.
