= CJ Rosser =

American basketball player (born 2009)

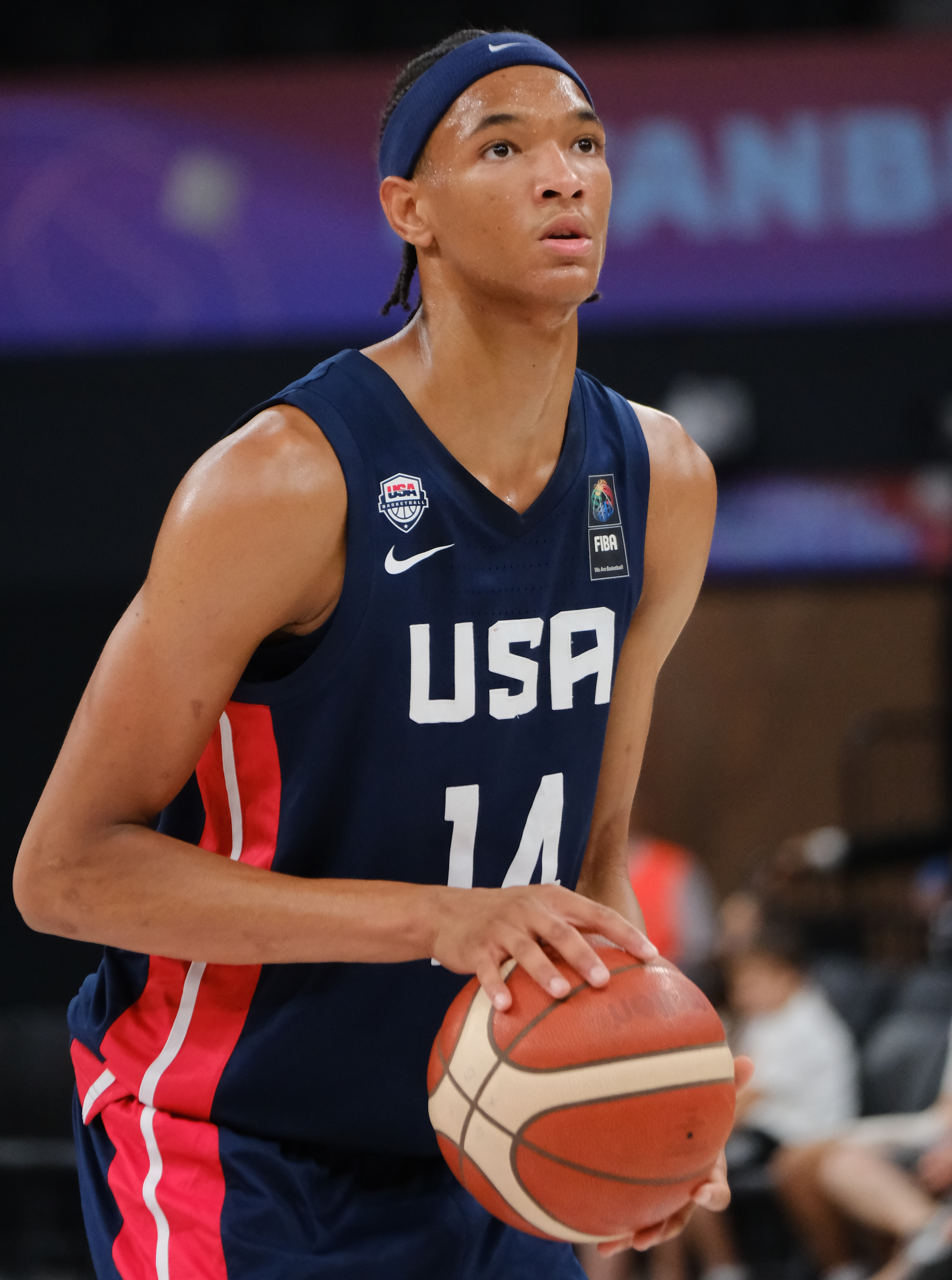
- Rosser in 2026

No. 4 – Southeastern Prep Falcons
- Position: Forward

Personal information
- Born: April 21, 2009 (age 17)
- Listed height: 6 ft 10 in (2.08 m)
- Listed weight: 195 lb (88 kg)

Career information
- High school: Northern Nash (Rocky Mount, North Carolina); Southeastern Prep (Orlando, Florida)
Medals
Representing the United States
Men's basketball
FIBA Under-17 World Cup
Gold medal – first place	2026 Turkey	Team
FIBA Under-16 AmeriCup
Gold medal – first place	2025 Mexico	Team

Clarence Rosser Jr. (born April 21, 2009) is an American high school basketball player who currently attends Southeastern Preparatory Academy in Orlando, Florida. He is a consensus five-star recruit and one of the top-ranked players in the 2027 class.

== Early life ==
Rosser is from Rocky Mount, North Carolina. His interest in basketball began at a young age by being around his sister, saying: "She'd pick me up and take me to the gym, and I'd just shoot the ball while she was practicing." Rosser experienced a growth spurt during his seventh-grade summer. He grew from 6 ft 3 in (1.91 m) to 6 ft 6 in (1.98 m).

Rosser initially attended Northern Nash High School in Rocky Mount, where he played basketball for the Fighting Knights. As a freshman, he averaged 10.2 points and 5.2 rebounds per game. That offseason, Rosser attracted significant attention playing with Team United on the Nike Elite Youth Basketball League (EYBL) circuit. By his sophomore year, he measured 6 ft 10 in (2.08 m) tall. That season, Rosser averaged 18.8 points, 6.7 rebounds, and 2.2 assists per game in an increased role on the team. He was named the Big East 2A/3A Conference Player of the Year after helping the team to an undefeated league record. Rosser earned first-team all-district honors from the North Carolina Basketball Coaches Association and second-team all-state honors from HighSchoolOT. In the offseason, he impressed with Team United at the Peach Jam after dominating in the EYBL U16 circuit.

In July 2025, Rosser announced he would be transferring to Southeastern Preparatory Academy in Orlando, Florida, for his junior season. His teammate on that summer's Team USA team, Beckham Black, attended the school. HighSchoolOT described the move as "one of the biggest departures in [North Carolina] state history." Southeastern Prep also announced it would be joining the Grind Session for the 2025–26 season.

As a junior, Rosser averaged 16.7 points and 6.7 rebounds in 40 games played. He earned first-team all-Sunshine Independent Athletic Association (SIAA) National Division honors and was named to the All-USA Southeast first team by USA Today. In October 2025, Rosser won MVP honors at the inaugural Bridge of Hoops Invitational in Italy after averaging 21.7 points and 9.3 rebounds per game and helping his team go undefeated. The following month, he recorded 25 points and nine rebounds in a highly anticipated matchup against Marcus Spears Jr. and Dynamic Prep at the Thanksgiving Hoopfest. Rosser scored his 1,000th career point and was honored during his return to his home state of North Carolina for the John Wall Holiday Invitational in December. He helped Southeastern Prep to a runner-up finish at the Grind Session World Championships in March 2026 after averaging 19.8 points and 7.5 rebounds per game, and garnered first-team All-Grind Session honors.

Rosser has said he models his game after Kevin Durant, Brandon Ingram, and Paul George, as well as his favorite player, Shai Gilgeous-Alexander.

=== Recruiting ===
Rosser is a consensus five-star recruit and one of the top players in the 2027 class, according to major recruiting services. His first college offer was from Presbyterian, and he began his sophomore year with double-digit offers. In January 2025, Rosser debuted as the No. 2 player in the 247Sports initial 2027 class rankings, only behind Baba Oladotun. In 2026, he was named the top recruit in the class by Rivals.com following the reclassification of Bruce Branch III. This was short-lived as Adan Diggs reclassified a year up to 2027, and claimed the No. 1 spot. In July 2026, Rosser earned the No. 1 spot once again, beating out Diggs after the EYBL.

== National team career ==
Rosser represented the United States at the 2025 FIBA U16 AmeriCup in Mexico. He averaged 13.7 points and 6.2 rebounds per game, helping his team to a gold medal and earning second-team all-tournament honors. Rosser recorded 16 points and 10 rebounds in their 108–71 win against Canada in the final.

== Personal life ==
In high school, Rosser partnered with the National Basketball Association's Jr. NBA Court of Leaders program. A self-described "country boy", he enjoys the outdoors and went fishing with Mark Pope and Mikhail McLean on a college recruiting trip in April 2026.
