= 2026 FIBA Under-17 Basketball World Cup =

International men's youth basketball championship

2026 FIBA 17 Yaş Altı Basketbol Dünya Kupası

Tournament details
- Host country: Turkey
- City: Istanbul
- Dates: 27 June – 5 July
- Teams: 16 (from 4 confederations)
- Venues: 2 (in 1 host city)

Final positions
- Champions: United States (8th title)
- Runners-up: Serbia
- Third place: Australia
- Fourth place: Turkey

Tournament statistics
- Games played: 56
- Attendance: 38,756 (692 per game)
- MVP: (United States) Joaquim Boumtje-Boumtje
- Top scorer: (New Zealand) Jayden Cecil (29.9 ppg)

Official website
- www.fiba.basketball

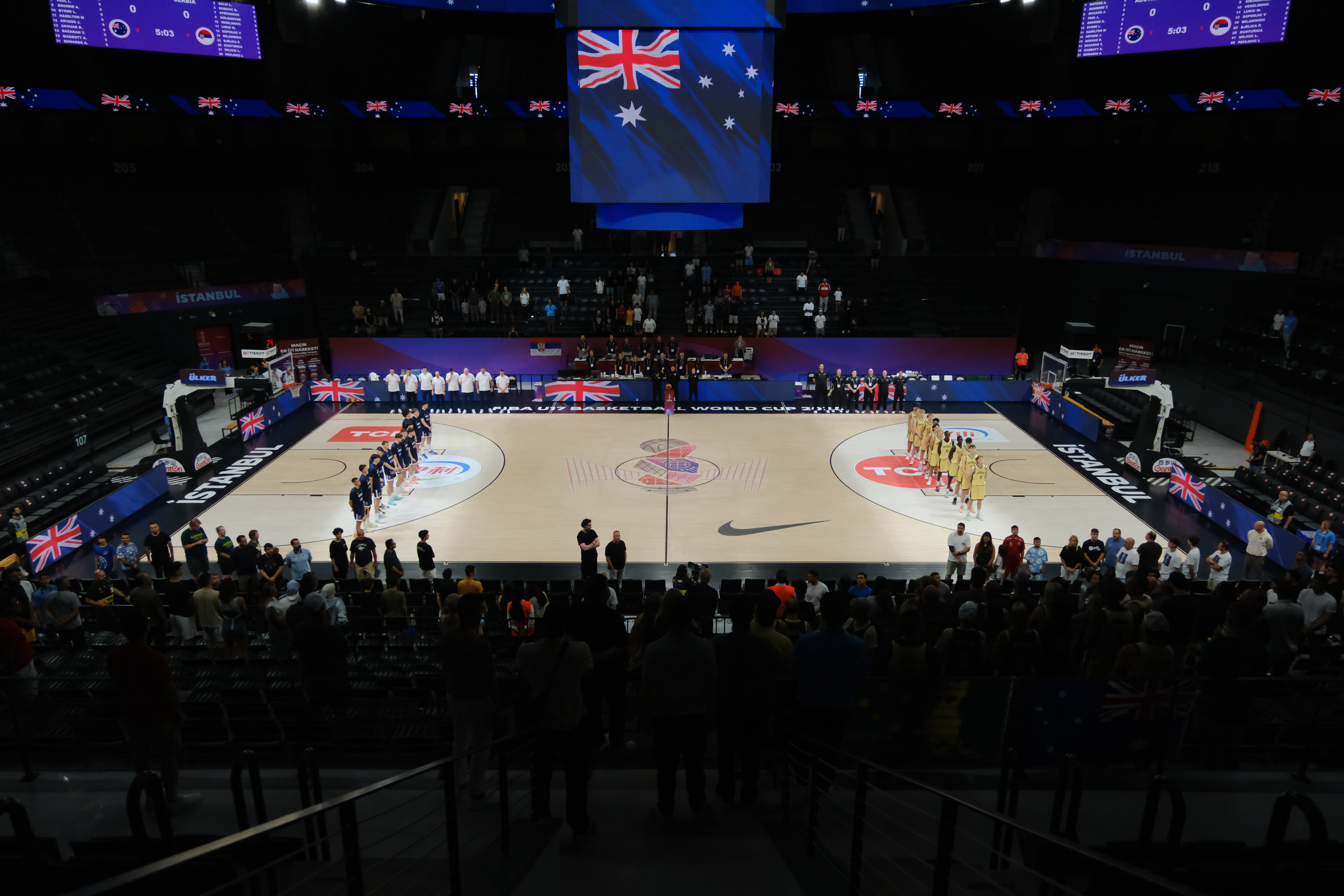
Australia vs Serbia pre-match ceremony

The 2026 FIBA Under-17 Basketball World Cup was the eighth edition of the FIBA Under-17 Basketball World Cup, the biennial international men's youth basketball championship contested by the U17 national teams of the member associations of FIBA. It was held in Istanbul, Turkey, from 27 June to 5 July 2026. To be eligible for this competition, players must have been born on or after 1 January 2009.

The United States won their eighth consecutive and overall title, in as many edition, with a finals win 107–81 over Serbia.

== Qualified teams ==
Means of qualification	Date(s)	Venue(s)	Berth(s)	Qualifiers
Host nation	—N/a	—N/a	1	Turkey
2025 FIBA U16 AmeriCup	2–8 June 2025	(Mexico) Ciudad Juárez	4	Canada; Puerto Rico; United States; Venezuela
2025 FIBA U16 EuroBasket	8–16 August 2025	(Georgia (country)) Tbilisi	5	France; Italy; Lithuania; Serbia; Slovenia
2025 FIBA U16 Asia Cup	31 August–7 September 2025	(Mongolia) Ulaanbaatar	4	Australia; China; Japan; New Zealand
2025 FIBA U16 AfroBasket	2–14 September 2025	(Rwanda) Kigali	2	Cameroon; Ivory Coast
Total			16	

== Draw ==
The draw took place on 29 January 2026 in Istanbul.

=== Seeding ===
The seeding was announced on 27 January 2026.

Pot 1 Team Turkey United States Serbia Lithuania	Pot 2 Team Slovenia Italy Australia Canada	Pot 3 Team France China New Zealand Venezuela	Pot 4 Team Ivory Coast Japan Cameroon Puerto Rico

== Referees ==
The following 28 referees were selected for the tournament.

- (Australia) Ruben Woolcock
- (Brazil) Alan Dos Santos
- (Brazil) Nicolas Zivieri
- (Canada) Waseem Husainy
- (China) Gao Yijie
- (China) Sun Jian
- (Ecuador) Carlos Peralta
- (Estonia) Mihkel Männiste
- (Greece) Ioannis Agrafiotis
- (Honduras) Orlando Varela
- (Hungary) Péter Praksch
- (Kazakhstan) Yevgeniy Mikheyev
- (Latvia) Gatis Saliņš
- (Madagascar) Yann Davidson
- (Montenegro) Nataša Dragojević
- (New Zealand) Martin Davison
- (Panama) Julio Anaya
- (Poland) Paulina Gajdosz
- (Poland) Wojciech Liszka
- (Puerto Rico) Julirys Guzmán
- (Rwanda) Jean Ruhamiriza
- (Serbia) Petar Pešić
- (South Africa) Arnold Moseya
- (South Korea) Park Kyoung-jin
- (Spain) Ariadna Chueca
- (Turkey) Cisil Güngör
- (United States) Blanca Burns
- (Uruguay) Aline García

== Preliminary round ==
All times are local (UTC+3).

=== Group A ===
Pos	Team	Pld	W	L	PF	PA	PD	Pts
1	United States	3	3	0	374	230	+144	6
2	France	3	2	1	265	240	+25	5
3	Italy	3	1	2	241	283	−42	4
4	Japan	3	0	3	187	314	−127	3

Source: FIBA
Rules for classification: 1) Points; 2) Head-to-head results; 3) Points difference; 4) Points scored.

27 June 2026
17:30

Boxscore

United States	115–84	France
Scoring by quarter: 26–15, 31–20, 29–22, 29–27
Pts: Black 23; Rebs: Williams 8 Asts: Daughtry 6		Pts: Soliman 18; Rebs: Soliman 7 Asts: Boungo 4

Basketball Development Center
(Main Venue), Istanbul
Attendance: 804
Referees: Wojciech Liszka (POL), Alan Dos Santos (BRA), Sun Jian (CHN)

27 June 2026
18:00

Boxscore

Italy	93–64	Japan
Scoring by quarter: 18–19, 25–16, 23–10, 27–19
Pts: Ruggeri 17; Rebs: Santini, Ventura 12; Asts: three players 4		Pts: Shiratani 27; Rebs: Shiratani 9 Asts: Miyazato 4

Basketball Development Center
(National Teams Venue), Istanbul
Attendance: 56
Referees: Ariadna Chueca (ESP), Ruben Woolcock (AUS), Nataša Dragojević (MNE)

28 June 2026
14:45

Boxscore

Japan	66–128	United States
Scoring by quarter: 17–27, 16–34, 18–31, 16–36
Pts: Sato 22; Rebs: Shiratani 7 Asts: Sato 4		Pts: Williams 25; Rebs: Dampier Jr. 11; Asts: Black 10

Basketball Development Center
(Main Venue), Istanbul
Attendance: 423
Referees: Ruben Woolcock (AUS), Cisil Güngör (TUR), Nicolas Zivieri (BRA)

28 June 2026
15:15

Boxscore

France	88–68	Italy
Scoring by quarter: 18–21, 18–15, 23–16, 29–16
Pts: Soliman 23; Rebs: Yangala 8 Asts: Sanz 5		Pts: Ventura 29; Rebs: Ventura 7 Asts: Vogogna 4

Basketball Development Center
(National Teams Venue), Istanbul
Attendance: 272
Referees: Petar Pešić (SRB), Yevgeniy Mikheyev (KAZ), Paulina Gajdosz (POL)

30 June 2026
12:00

Boxscore

Italy	80–131	United States
Scoring by quarter: 15–27, 18–34, 21–37, 26–33
Pts: Ventura 20; Rebs: Santini 5 Asts: Zotti 6		Pts: Rosser Jr. 22; Rebs: Boumtje-Boumtje 11; Asts: Daughtry 9

Basketball Development Center
(Main Venue), Istanbul
Attendance: 320
Referees: Mihkel Männiste (EST), Aline García (URU), Arnold Moseya (RSA)

30 June 2026
12:00

Boxscore

France	93–57	Japan
Scoring by quarter: 31–22, 21–10, 14–10, 27–15
Pts: Boudine 18; Rebs: Yangala 9 Asts: Towo-Nansi 7		Pts: Shiratani 33; Rebs: Shiratani 7 Asts: Ihetu, Miyazato 3

Basketball Development Center
(National Teams Venue), Istanbul
Attendance: 166
Referees: Carlos Peralta (ECU), Péter Praksch (HUN), Paulina Gajdosz (POL)

=== Group B ===
Pos	Team	Pld	W	L	PF	PA	PD	Pts
1	Lithuania	3	3	0	275	200	+75	6
2	Canada	3	2	1	280	245	+35	5
3	China	3	1	2	236	237	−1	4
4	Cameroon	3	0	3	179	288	−109	3

Source: FIBA
Rules for classification: 1) Points; 2) Head-to-head results; 3) Points difference; 4) Points scored.

27 June 2026
12:00

Boxscore

Canada	89–103	Lithuania
Scoring by quarter: 23–20, 22–23, 26–22, 18–38
Pts: Mitakaro 22; Rebs: Edwards 12; Asts: St. Louis 7		Pts: Kukta 29; Rebs: Kukta 9 Asts: Kukta 10

Basketball Development Center
(Main Venue), Istanbul
Attendance: 360
Referees: Péter Praksch (HUN), Orlando Varela (HON), Yann Davidson (MAD)

27 June 2026
12:30

Boxscore

Cameroon	72–90	China
Scoring by quarter: 20–33, 11–17, 18–23, 23–17
Pts: Ngangmeni 23; Rebs: Essoua 11; Asts: Mendoua 3		Pts: Zhang Yi. 23; Rebs: Zhang Yu., Zhang Z. 7 Asts: Zhang Yi. 6

Basketball Development Center
(National Teams Venue), Istanbul
Attendance: 84
Referees: Gatis Saliņš (LAT), Aline García (URU), Jean Ruhamiriza (RWA)

28 June 2026
17:30

Boxscore

Lithuania	94–43	Cameroon
Scoring by quarter: 22–10, 16–11, 24–12, 32–10
Pts: Sabeckas 22; Rebs: Biržinis 9 Asts: Stankevičius 7		Pts: Ngangmeni 10; Rebs: N'Koumngock 9 Asts: Nouhet-Epesse 2

Basketball Development Center
(Main Venue), Istanbul
Attendance: 326
Referees: Julio Anaya (PAN), Julirys Guzmán (PUR), Arnold Moseya (RSA)

28 June 2026
18:00

Boxscore

China	78–87	Canada
Scoring by quarter: 15–23, 27–14, 21–21, 15–29
Pts: Zhang Yi. 21; Rebs: Zhao 10; Asts: Zhang Yu. 5		Pts: Clarke, Hamilton 19; Rebs: Clarke 18; Asts: Mitakaro 4

Basketball Development Center
(National Teams Venue), Istanbul
Attendance: 244
Referees: Wojciech Liszka (POL), Blanca Burns (USA), Martin Davison (NZL)

30 June 2026
14:45

Boxscore

Cameroon	64–104	Canada
Scoring by quarter: 18–26, 21–31, 8–17, 17–30
Pts: Nouhet-Epesse 14; Rebs: Essoua 8 Asts: Mendoua 4		Pts: Mitakaro 23; Rebs: Clarke 9 Asts: Badejo 5

Basketball Development Center
(National Teams Venue), Istanbul
Attendance: 134
Referees: Petar Pešić (SRB), Martin Davison (NZL), Nataša Dragojević (MNE)

30 June 2026
14:45

Boxscore

Lithuania	78–68	China
Scoring by quarter: 15–14, 14–19, 25–23, 14–12
Pts: Biržinis, Kukta 14; Rebs: Biržinis 16; Asts: Kukta 8		Pts: Shi 18; Rebs: Liu, Zhao 7 Asts: Chen 7

Basketball Development Center
(Main Venue), Istanbul
Attendance: 268
Referees: Julio Anaya (PAN), Blanca Burns (USA), Julirys Guzmán (PUR)

=== Group C ===
Pos	Team	Pld	W	L	PF	PA	PD	Pts
1	Turkey (H)	3	3	0	297	243	+54	6
2	Puerto Rico	3	2	1	254	253	+1	5
3	New Zealand	3	1	2	256	271	−15	4
4	Slovenia	3	0	3	218	258	−40	3

Source: FIBA
Rules for classification: 1) Points; 2) Head-to-head results; 3) Points difference; 4) Points scored.
(H) Hosts

27 June 2026
20:15

Boxscore

New Zealand	100–112 (2OT)	Turkey
Scoring by quarter: 22–20, 19–8, 23–19, 20–37, Overtime: 12–12, 4–16
Pts: Cecil 42; Rebs: Cate 12; Asts: Cate 9		Pts: Kutluay 39; Rebs: Karutasu 11; Asts: Karutasu 9

Basketball Development Center
(Main Venue), Istanbul
Attendance: 1,007
Referees: Julio Anaya (PAN), Yevgeniy Mikheyev (KAZ), Gao Yijie (CHN)

27 June 2026
20:45

Boxscore

Slovenia	78–92	Puerto Rico
Scoring by quarter: 14–14, 19–24, 21–27, 24–27
Pts: Siftar 31; Rebs: Jarc 10; Asts: Rezec 6		Pts: Gaines 32; Rebs: Albino 8 Asts: Gaines 4

Basketball Development Center
(National Teams Venue), Istanbul
Attendance: 39
Referees: Mihkel Männiste (EST), Petar Pešić (SRB), Nicolas Zivieri (BRA)

28 June 2026
20:15

Boxscore

Turkey	87–66	Slovenia
Scoring by quarter: 21–18, 19–18, 23–14, 24–16
Pts: Kutluay 26; Rebs: Karutasu 14; Asts: Kutluay 10		Pts: Siftar 19; Rebs: Rožnik 6 Asts: Pejić, Rožnik 4

Basketball Development Center
(Main Venue), Istanbul
Attendance: 1,103
Referees: Carlos Peralta (ECU), Alan Dos Santos (BRA), Sun Jian (CHN)

28 June 2026
20:45

Boxscore

Puerto Rico	85–77	New Zealand
Scoring by quarter: 8–19, 29–21, 17–23, 31–14
Pts: Gaines 30; Rebs: Albino 9 Asts: Gaines 4		Pts: Cecil 22; Rebs: Cate, Rampton 10; Asts: Cate 8

Basketball Development Center
(National Teams Venue), Istanbul
Attendance: 67
Referees: Gatis Saliņš (LAT), Waseem Husainy (CAN), Aline García (URU)

30 June 2026
20:15

Boxscore

New Zealand	79–74	Slovenia
Scoring by quarter: 24–15, 19–18, 18–19, 18–22
Pts: Keogh 20; Rebs: Keogh 8 Asts: Cate 9		Pts: Rezec 20; Rebs: Rožnik 10; Asts: Pejić 5

Basketball Development Center
(National Teams Venue), Istanbul
Attendance: 89
Referees: Wojciech Liszka (POL), Sun Jian (CHN), Jean Ruhamiriza (RWA)

30 June 2026
20:15

Boxscore

Puerto Rico	77–98	Turkey
Scoring by quarter: 23–29, 12–28, 19–20, 23–21
Pts: Gaines 19; Rebs: Arroyo, Rosado 6 Asts: Gaines 5		Pts: Kutluay 32; Rebs: Karutasu 9 Asts: Kutluay 12

Basketball Development Center
(Main Venue), Istanbul
Attendance: 1,683
Referees: Gatis Saliņš (LAT), Waseem Husainy (CAN), Nicolas Zivieri (BRA)

=== Group D ===
Pos	Team	Pld	W	L	PF	PA	PD	Pts
1	Australia	3	3	0	241	186	+55	6
2	Serbia	3	2	1	247	212	+35	5
3	Ivory Coast	3	1	2	218	238	−20	4
4	Venezuela	3	0	3	163	233	−70	3

Source: FIBA
Rules for classification: 1) Points; 2) Head-to-head results; 3) Points difference; 4) Points scored.

27 June 2026
14:45

Boxscore

Australia	88–66	Serbia
Scoring by quarter: 19–14, 19–12, 23–24, 27–16
Pts: Basaran 15; Rebs: Aryang 11; Asts: Paul 8		Pts: Kusturica 17; Rebs: Bjelica, Galić 6 Asts: Stepanović 4

Basketball Development Center
(Main Venue), Istanbul
Attendance: 351
Referees: Carlos Peralta (ECU), Julirys Guzmán (PUR), Paulina Gajdosz (POL)

27 June 2026
15:15

Boxscore

Venezuela	63–74	Ivory Coast
Scoring by quarter: 16–16, 15–22, 13–21, 19–15
Pts: Vásquez 14; Rebs: Gutiérrez 9 Asts: Anillo, Vásquez 5		Pts: Oka 18; Rebs: Ouédraogo 11; Asts: Koffi 6

Basketball Development Center
(National Teams Venue), Istanbul
Attendance: 62
Referees: Waseem Husainy (CAN), Cisil Güngör (TUR), Martin Davison (NZL)

28 June 2026
12:00

Boxscore

Serbia	84–53	Venezuela
Scoring by quarter: 25–20, 25–4, 16–15, 18–14
Pts: Kusturica 19; Rebs: Đurović 9 Asts: Pavlović, Simjanovski 3		Pts: C. Pérez 14; Rebs: Echezuria 7 Asts: Echezuria 4

Basketball Development Center
(Main Venue), Istanbul
Attendance: 251
Referees: Ariadna Chueca (ESP), Yann Davidson (MAD), Ioannis Agrafiotis (GRE)

28 June 2026
12:30

Boxscore

Ivory Coast	73–78	Australia
Scoring by quarter: 15–14, 21–21, 20–18, 17–25
Pts: Koffi 20; Rebs: Oka 13; Asts: Koffi 4		Pts: Paul 18; Rebs: Basaran 12; Asts: Paul 7

Basketball Development Center
(National Teams Venue), Istanbul
Attendance: 193
Referees: Mihkel Männiste (EST), Park Kyoung-jin (KOR), Gao Yijie (CHN)

30 June 2026
17:30

Boxscore

Venezuela	47–75	Australia
Scoring by quarter: 5–17, 11–20, 19–22, 12–16
Pts: Echezuria, Gómez 9 Rebs: Gines 6 Asts: three players 2		Pts: Browne 17; Rebs: Mabbott 8 Asts: Paul 7

Basketball Development Center
(National Teams Venue), Istanbul
Attendance: 114
Referees: Alan Dos Santos (BRA), Cisil Güngör (TUR), Park Kyoung-jin (KOR)

30 June 2026
17:30

Boxscore

Serbia	97–71	Ivory Coast
Scoring by quarter: 24–17, 23–22, 30–20, 20–12
Pts: Kusturica 17; Rebs: Miladinović 12; Asts: Simjanovski 8		Pts: Djako 27; Rebs: Konaté, Oka 8 Asts: Koffi 6

Basketball Development Center
(Main Venue), Istanbul
Attendance: 502
Referees: Ariadna Chueca (ESP), Orlando Varela (HON), Ioannis Agrafiotis (GRE)

== Final round ==
=== Bracket ===
Round of 16
1 July
United States	141
Cameroon	85
1 July
Puerto Rico	101
Ivory Coast	85
1 July
Italy	64
Canada	86
1 July
Slovenia	75
Australia	104
1 July
France	96
China	70
1 July
Turkey	78
Venezuela	73
1 July
Japan	62
Lithuania	98
1 July
New Zealand	91
Serbia	121

Quarter-finals
3 July
United States	149
Puerto Rico	82
3 July
Canada	86
Australia	100
3 July
France	87
Turkey	94
3 July
Lithuania	78
Serbia	101

Semi-finals
4 July
United States	114
Australia	65
4 July
Turkey	71
Serbia	76

Final
5 July
United States	107
Serbia	81
Third place
5 July
Australia	77
Turkey	69

=== Round of 16 ===
1 July 2026
12:00

Boxscore

Japan	62–98	Lithuania
Scoring by quarter: 15–17, 13–18, 19–27, 15–36
Pts: Shiratani 20; Rebs: Konno 7 Asts: Shiratani 4		Pts: Buivydas 20; Rebs: Raščius 11; Asts: Sinica 5

Basketball Development Center
(Main Venue), Istanbul
Attendance: 106
Referees: Alan Dos Santos (BRA), Yevgeniy Mikheyev (KAZ), Jean Ruhamiriza (RWA)

1 July 2026
12:30

Boxscore

France	96–70	China
Scoring by quarter: 28–18, 27–22, 21–15, 20–15
Pts: Soliman 18; Rebs: Yangala 7 Asts: Towo-Nansi 5		Pts: Liu 20; Rebs: Liu 7 Asts: Chen 5

Basketball Development Center
(National Teams Venue), Istanbul
Attendance: 159
Referees: Ruben Woolcock (AUS), Petar Pešić (SRB), Park Kyoung-jin (KOR)

1 July 2026
14:45

Boxscore

United States	141–85	Cameroon
Scoring by quarter: 40–21, 29–25, 37–19, 35–20
Pts: Montgomery 23; Rebs: Williams 10; Asts: Black 9		Pts: Ngangmeni 24; Rebs: Ngangmeni 6 Asts: Nouhet-Epesse 6

Basketball Development Center
(Main Venue), Istanbul
Attendance: 215
Referees: Ariadna Chueca (ESP), Péter Praksch (HUN), Gao Yijie (CHN)

1 July 2026
15:15

Boxscore

Italy	64–86	Canada
Scoring by quarter: 13–21, 15–17, 10–32, 26–16
Pts: Nicolodi, Santini 10; Rebs: Santini 10; Asts: Zotti 6		Pts: Mitakaro, St. Louis 12; Rebs: Edwards 13; Asts: St. Louis 6

Basketball Development Center
(National Teams Venue), Istanbul
Attendance: 131
Referees: Wojciech Liszka (POL), Orlando Varela (HON), Paulina Gajdosz (POL)

1 July 2026
17:30

Boxscore

Slovenia	75–104	Australia
Scoring by quarter: 16–30, 14–28, 26–22, 19–24
Pts: Pejić 15; Rebs: Pirnat 7 Asts: Rezec 5		Pts: Browne, Paul 20; Rebs: Paul 6 Asts: Paul 8

Basketball Development Center
(Main Venue), Istanbul
Attendance: 259
Referees: Julio Anaya (PAN), Blanca Burns (USA), Yann Davidson (MAD)

1 July 2026
18:00

Boxscore

New Zealand	91–121	Serbia
Scoring by quarter: 16–31, 23–25, 21–37, 31–28
Pts: Cecil 37; Rebs: Keogh 7 Asts: Cate 3		Pts: Kusturica 27; Rebs: Bjelica 9 Asts: Simjanovski 6

Basketball Development Center
(National Teams Venue), Istanbul
Attendance: 171
Referees: Gatis Saliņš (LAT), Waseem Husainy (CAN), Nicolas Zivieri (BRA)

1 July 2026
20:15

Boxscore

Turkey	78–73	Venezuela
Scoring by quarter: 24–22, 13–18, 23–14, 18–19
Pts: Karutasu 25; Rebs: Karutasu 12; Asts: Kutluay 8		Pts: Vásquez 19; Rebs: Vásquez 6 Asts: Gutiérrez 4

Basketball Development Center
(Main Venue), Istanbul
Attendance: 995
Referees: Carlos Peralta (ECU), Martin Davison (NZL), Julirys Guzmán (PUR)

1 July 2026
20:45

Boxscore

Puerto Rico	101–85	Ivory Coast
Scoring by quarter: 24–30, 23–20, 24–19, 30–16
Pts: Gaines 36; Rebs: Rodríguez 9 Asts: Gaines 9		Pts: Djako 21; Rebs: Ouedraogo 12; Asts: Koffi, Ouedraogo 4

Basketball Development Center
(National Teams Venue), Istanbul
Attendance: 55
Referees: Mihkel Männiste (EST), Cisil Güngör (TUR), Sun Jian (CHN)

=== 9–16th classification playoffs ===
Classification quarterfinals
3 July
Cameroon	62
Ivory Coast	77
3 July
Italy	64
Slovenia	70
3 July
China	84
Venezuela	63
3 July
Japan	83
New Zealand	104

Classification semifinals
4 July
Ivory Coast	73
Slovenia	86
4 July
China	92
New Zealand	79

Ninth place match
5 July
Slovenia	76
China	71
Eleventh place match
5 July
Ivory Coast	85
New Zealand	81

Classification semifinals
4 July
Cameroon	74
Italy	93
4 July
Venezuela	52
Japan	62

13th place match
5 July
Italy	95
Japan	62
15th place match
5 July
Cameroon	61
Venezuela	71

==== 9–16th place quarterfinals ====
3 July 2026
12:00

Boxscore

Japan	83–104	New Zealand
Scoring by quarter: 20–27, 26–26, 21–27, 16–24
Pts: Shiratani 35; Rebs: Shiratani 13; Asts: Sakurai 8		Pts: Cecil 31; Rebs: Cecil 11; Asts: Cecil 6

Basketball Development Center
(National Teams Venue), Istanbul
Attendance: 47
Referees: Julirys Guzmán (PUR), Ventsislav Velikov (BUL), Paulina Gajdosz (POL)

3 July 2026
14:45

Boxscore

China	84–63	Venezuela
Scoring by quarter: 23–23, 16–17, 24–11, 21–12
Pts: Chen 18; Rebs: Zhang Yi. 7 Asts: Chen 7		Pts: Vásquez 23; Rebs: Gutiérrez 11; Asts: C. Pérez 7

Basketball Development Center
(National Teams Venue), Istanbul
Attendance: 53
Referees: Waseem Husainy (CAN), Yevgeniy Mikheyev (KAZ), Nataša Dragojević (MNE)

3 July 2026
17:30

Boxscore

Cameroon	62–77	Ivory Coast
Scoring by quarter: 13–15, 15–27, 13–21, 19–16
Pts: Nouhet-Epesse 16; Rebs: Essoua 11; Asts: Mendoua15 5		Pts: Djako, Oka; Rebs: Ouedraogo 10; Asts: Djako, Koffi 5

Basketball Development Center
(National Teams Venue), Istanbul
Attendance: 50
Referees: Yann Davidson (MAD), Arnold Moseya (RSA), Jean Ruhamiriza (RWA)

3 July 2026
20:15

Boxscore

Italy	64–70	Slovenia
Scoring by quarter: 20–16, 12–21, 21–18, 11–15
Pts: Ronci 27; Rebs: Santini 7 Asts: Ronci 4		Pts: Siftar 20; Rebs: Jarc 11; Asts: Pejić 5

Basketball Development Center
(National Teams Venue), Istanbul
Attendance: 65
Referees: Mihkel Männiste (EST), Viola Györgyi (NOR), Ioannis Agrafiotis (GRE)

==== 13–16th place semifinals ====
4 July 2026
11:45

Boxscore

Venezuela	52–62	Japan
Scoring by quarter: 18–22, 11–14, 12–17, 11–9
Pts: Gutiérrez 13; Rebs: Gutiérrez 11; Asts: Anillo, Gutiérrez 3		Pts: Shiratani 20; Rebs: Shiratani 14; Asts: Miyazato 7

Basketball Development Center
(National Teams Venue), Istanbul
Attendance: 63
Referees: Sun Jian (CHN), Paulina Gajdosz (POL), Ioannis Agrafiotis (GRE)

4 July 2026
14:30

Boxscore

Cameroon	74–93	Italy
Scoring by quarter: 17–22, 19–20, 12–27, 26–24
Pts: Essoua 13; Rebs: Pounouko 11; Asts: Nouhet-Epesse 3		Pts: Malano 20; Rebs: Bagordo 6 Asts: Zotti 9

Basketball Development Center
(National Teams Venue), Istanbul
Attendance: 78
Referees: Viola Györgyi (NOR), Yevgeniy Mikheyev (KAZ), Gao Yijie (CHN)

==== 15th place game ====
5 July 2026
10:30

Boxscore

Cameroon	61–71	Venezuela
Scoring by quarter: 11–19, 18–23, 21–17, 11–12
Pts: Ngangmeni 15; Rebs: Essoua 11; Asts: Ngangmeni 4		Pts: Vásquez, C. Pérez 15; Rebs: Gutiérrez 9 Asts: C. Pérez 5

Basketball Development Center
(National Teams Venue), Istanbul
Attendance: 75
Referees: Yevgeniy Mikheyev (KAZ), Arnold Moseya (RSA), Nataša Dragojević (MNE)

==== 13th place game ====
5 July 2026
13:00

Boxscore

Italy	95–62	Japan
Scoring by quarter: 28–9, 17–18, 29–18, 21–17
Pts: Ventura 21; Rebs: Santini 8 Asts: Machetti 7		Pts: Shiratani 22; Rebs: Yamamoto 6 Asts: Sakurai, Shiratani 4

Basketball Development Center
(National Teams Venue), Istanbul
Attendance: 89
Referees: Park Kyoung-jin (KOR), Aline García (URU), Ioannis Agrafiotis (GRE)

==== 9–12th place semifinals ====
4 July 2026
17:15

Boxscore

China	92–79	New Zealand
Scoring by quarter: 16–25, 19–22, 26–17, 31–15
Pts: Zhang C. 24; Rebs: Zhao, Zhang Yi. 7 Asts: Chen 7		Pts: Cecil 25; Rebs: Cate 8 Asts: three players 3

Basketball Development Center
(National Teams Venue), Istanbul
Attendance: 45
Referees: Petar Pešić (SRB), Péter Praksch (HUN), Jean Ruhamiriza (RWA)

4 July 2026
20:00

Boxscore

Ivory Coast	73–86	Slovenia
Scoring by quarter: 14–23, 27–15, 22–21, 10–27
Pts: Siransi 12; Rebs: Oka 11; Asts: Djako, Koffi 3		Pts: Siftar 21; Rebs: Rezec 9 Asts: Jarc 7

Basketball Development Center
(National Teams Venue), Istanbul
Attendance: 45
Referees: Blanca Burns (USA), Julirys Guzmán (PUR), Park Kyoung-jin (KOR)

==== Eleventh place game ====
5 July 2026
15:30

Boxscore

Ivory Coast	85–81	New Zealand
Scoring by quarter: 22–24, 15–14, 18–26, 30–17
Pts: Oka 22; Rebs: Ouedraogo 13; Asts: Oka 4		Pts: Cecil 38; Rebs: Keogh 9 Asts: Cate 4

Basketball Development Center
(National Teams Venue), Istanbul
Attendance: 69
Referees: Petar Pešić (SRB), Péter Praksch (HUN), Viola Györgyi (NOR)

==== Ninth place game ====
5 July 2026
18:00

Boxscore

Slovenia	76–71	China
Scoring by quarter: 13–19, 18–20, 20–14, 25–18
Pts: Jarc 27; Rebs: Jarc 10; Asts: Pejić 5		Pts: Zhang Yi. 18; Rebs: Zhao 6 Asts: Chen 5

Basketball Development Center
(National Teams Venue), Istanbul
Attendance: 85
Referees: Yann Davidson (MAD), Ventsislav Velikov (BUL), Cisil Güngör (TUR)

=== Quarterfinals ===
3 July 2026
12:30

Boxscore

Canada	86–100	Australia
Scoring by quarter: 12–26, 20–25, 21–25, 33–24
Pts: Hamilton 19; Rebs: Kapuanya 6 Asts: Mitakaro 5		Pts: Paul 21; Rebs: Basaran 11; Asts: Paul 10

Basketball Development Center
(Main Venue), Istanbul
Attendance: 273
Referees: Alan Dos Santos (BRA), Sun Jian (CHN), Nicolas Zivieri (BRA)

3 July 2026
15:15

Boxscore

United States	149–82	Puerto Rico
Scoring by quarter: 40–29, 32–18, 44–16, 33–19
Pts: Boumtje-Boumtje 31; Rebs: Boumtje-Boumtje 16; Asts: Black 12		Pts: Gaines 24; Rebs: Rodríguez 6 Asts: Gaines 4

Basketball Development Center
(Main Venue), Istanbul
Attendance: 454
Referees: Petar Pešić (SRB), Cisil Güngör (TUR), Park Kyoung-jin (KOR)

3 July 2026
18:00

Boxscore

Lithuania	78–101	Serbia
Scoring by quarter: 20–21, 14–23, 33–22, 11–35
Pts: Biržinis 17; Rebs: Kukta 8 Asts: Buivydas 6		Pts: Kusturica 30; Rebs: Miladinović 8 Asts: Simjanovski 6

Basketball Development Center
(Main Venue), Istanbul
Attendance: 723
Referees: Carlos Peralta (ECU), Ruben Woolcock (AUS), Martin Davison (NZL)

3 July 2026
20:45

Boxscore

France	87–94	Turkey
Scoring by quarter: 24–21, 22–24, 24–23, 17–26
Pts: Towo-Nansi 20; Rebs: Yangala 8 Asts: Towo-Nansi 7		Pts: Kutluay 30; Rebs: Tolan 7 Asts: Kutluay 11

Basketball Development Center
(Main Venue), Istanbul
Attendance: 3,925
Referees: Julio Anaya (PAN), Blanca Burns (USA), Orlando Varela (HON)

=== 5–8th classification playoffs ===
Classification semifinals
4 July
Puerto Rico	82
Canada	101
4 July
France	73
Lithuania	59

Fifth place match
5 July
Canada	76
France	97
Seventh place match
5 July
Puerto Rico	93
Lithuania	98

==== 5–8th place semifinals ====
4 July 2026
12:15

Boxscore

Puerto Rico	82–101	Canada
Scoring by quarter: 28–27, 12–26, 26–16, 16–32
Pts: Willmore 24; Rebs: Albino, Willmore 4 Asts: Gaines 8		Pts: Mitakaro 23; Rebs: Clarke 12; Asts: Mitakaro 10

Basketball Development Center
(Main Venue), Istanbul
Attendance: 115
Referees: Carlos Peralta (ECU), Ventsislav Velikov (BUL), Aline García (URU)

4 July 2026
15:00

Boxscore

France	73–59	Lithuania
Scoring by quarter: 17–17, 14–12, 15–11, 27–19
Pts: Yangala 15; Rebs: Soliman 10; Asts: Soliman 8		Pts: Sabeckas 17; Rebs: Raščius 8 Asts: Kukta 5

Basketball Development Center
(Main Venue), Istanbul
Attendance: 285
Referees: Ruben Woolcock (AUS), Cisil Güngör (TUR), Nicolas Zivieri (BRA)

==== Seventh place game ====
5 July 2026
11:30

Boxscore

Puerto Rico	93–98	Lithuania
Scoring by quarter: 24–26, 28–22, 19–18, 22–32
Pts: Gaines 27; Rebs: Albino 6 Asts: Torres 6		Pts: Sabeckas 26; Rebs: Birzinis 8 Asts: Kukta 13

Basketball Development Center
(Main Venue), Istanbul
Attendance: 197
Referees: Waseem Husainy (CAN), Nicolas Zivieri (BRA), Jean Ruhamiriza (RWA)

==== Fifth place game ====
5 July 2026
14:15

Boxscore

Canada	76–97	France
Scoring by quarter: 15–29, 12–27, 27–20, 22–21
Pts: Clarke 13; Rebs: Clarke 5 Asts: Edwards 7		Pts: Soliman 37; Rebs: Soliman 12; Asts: Towo-Nansi 11

Basketball Development Center
(Main Venue), Istanbul
Attendance: 286
Referees: Mihkel Männiste (EST), Julirys Guzmán (PUR), Orlando Varela (HON)

=== Semifinals ===
4 July 2026
18:00

Boxscore

United States	114–65	Australia
Scoring by quarter: 23–21, 26–14, 32–10, 33–20
Pts: Boumtje-Boumtje 23; Rebs: Boumtje-Boumtje 14; Asts: Black, Collins 5		Pts: Paul 12; Rebs: Basaran 6 Asts: Browne, Paul 3

Basketball Development Center
(Main Venue), Istanbul
Attendance: 1,641
Referees: Julio Anaya (PAN), Orlando Varela (HON), Martin Davison (NZL)

4 July 2026
21:00

Boxscore

Turkey	71–76	Serbia
Scoring by quarter: 16–19, 16–21, 22–15, 17–21
Pts: Kutluay 25; Rebs: Karutasu 10; Asts: Kutluay 8		Pts: Kusturica 25; Rebs: three players 6 Asts: Simjanovski 6

Basketball Development Center
(Main Venue), Istanbul
Attendance: 8,348
Referees: Alan Dos Santos (BRA), Mihkel Männiste (EST), Waseem Husainy (CAN)

=== Third place game ===
5 July 2026
17:15

Boxscore

Australia	77–69	Turkey
Scoring by quarter: 30–12, 19–20, 12–22, 16–15
Pts: Paul 19; Rebs: Paul 10; Asts: Paul 7		Pts: Kutluay 32; Rebs: Kutluay 7 Asts: Kutluay 5

Basketball Development Center
(Main Venue), Istanbul
Attendance: 7,192
Referees: Carlos Peralta (ECU), Blanca Burns (USA), Martin Davison (NZL)

=== Final ===
5 July 2026
20:15

Boxscore

United States	107–81	Serbia
Scoring by quarter: 30–19, 27–26, 24–16, 26–20
Pts: Rosser 23; Rebs: Boumtje-Boumtje 15; Asts: Black 10		Pts: Kusturica 37; Rebs: Kusturica 9 Asts: Lukic, Bjelica 4

Basketball Development Center
(Main Venue), Istanbul
Attendance: 3,544
Referees: Julio Anaya (PAN), Ruben Woolcock (AUS), Alan Dos Santos (BRA)

== Final standings ==
Rank	Team	Record
1st place, gold medalist(s)	United States	7–0
2nd place, silver medalist(s)	Serbia	5–2
3rd place, bronze medalist(s)	Australia	6–1
4th	Turkey	5–2
5th	France	5–2
6th	Canada	4–3
7th	Lithuania	5–2
8th	Puerto Rico	3–4
9th	Slovenia	3–4
10th	China	3–4
11th	Ivory Coast	3–4
12th	New Zealand	2–5
13th	Italy	3–4
14th	Japan	1–6
15th	Venezuela	1–6
16th	Cameroon	0–7

== Statistics and awards ==
=== Statistical leaders ===
==== Players ====
Points

Name	PPG
(New Zealand) Jayden Cecil	29.9
(Turkey) Ömer Kutluay	28.4
(Puerto Rico) Dwight Gaines	25.9
(Serbia) Nikola Kusturica	24.6
(Japan) Chusonjakku Shiratani	23.9

Rebounds

Name	RPG
(United States) Joaquim Boumtje Boumtje	10.9
(Turkey) Darius Karutasu	9.7
(Ivory Coast) Raphael Ouedraogo	9.0
(Canada) Isaiah Clarke	8.7
(Ivory Coast) Jean-Philippe Oka	8.6

Assists

Name	APG
(Turkey) Ömer Kutluay	9.0
(United States) Beckham Black	8.3
(Australia) Luke Paul	7.1
(Lithuania) Jokubas Kukta	7.0
(China) Chen Yuxiu	5.7
(France) Aaron Towo-Nansi	5.7
(New Zealand) Tawhiri Cate	5.7

Blocks

Name	BPG
(China) Zhao Boxin	3.6
(New Zealand) Zach Rampton	3.3
(Australia) Yahya Basaran	2.3
(Australia) Riak Akhuar	2.1
(United States) Joaquim Boumtje Boumtje	2.1

Steals

Name	SPG
(Puerto Rico) Dwight Gaines	4.9
(Ivory Coast) Nathan Djako	3.7
(United States) Beckham Black	3.0
(Canada) Tristan Edwards	2.6
(Japan) Chusonjakku Shiratani	2.6

Efficiency

Name	EFFPG
(United States) Joaquim Boumtje Boumtje	29.3
(Turkey) Ömer Kutluay	28.3
(Turkey) Darius Karutasu	27.3
(Serbia) Nikola Kusturica	24.7
(France) Nathan Soliman	22.9

==== Teams ====
Points

Team	PPG
United States	126.4
Canada	89.9
Serbia	89.4
France	88.3
Puerto Rico	87.3

Rebounds

Team	RPG
New Zealand	52.3
Canada	52.1
United States	52.0
Ivory Coast	50.3
Serbia	49.0

Assists

Team	APG
United States	34.1
Lithuania	24.4
Australia	23.6
France	23.3
Italy	20.9

Blocks

Team	BPG
Australia	9.7
United States	7.3
Serbia	6.7
Ivory Coast	6.6
New Zealand	5.7

Steals

Team	SPG
Puerto Rico	15.6
United States	13.7
Ivory Coast	12.4
Venezuela	11.3
Canada	11.1

Efficiency

Team	EFFPG
United States	174.6
Australia	108.3
France	107.0
Serbia	104.3
Lithuania	103.4

=== Awards ===
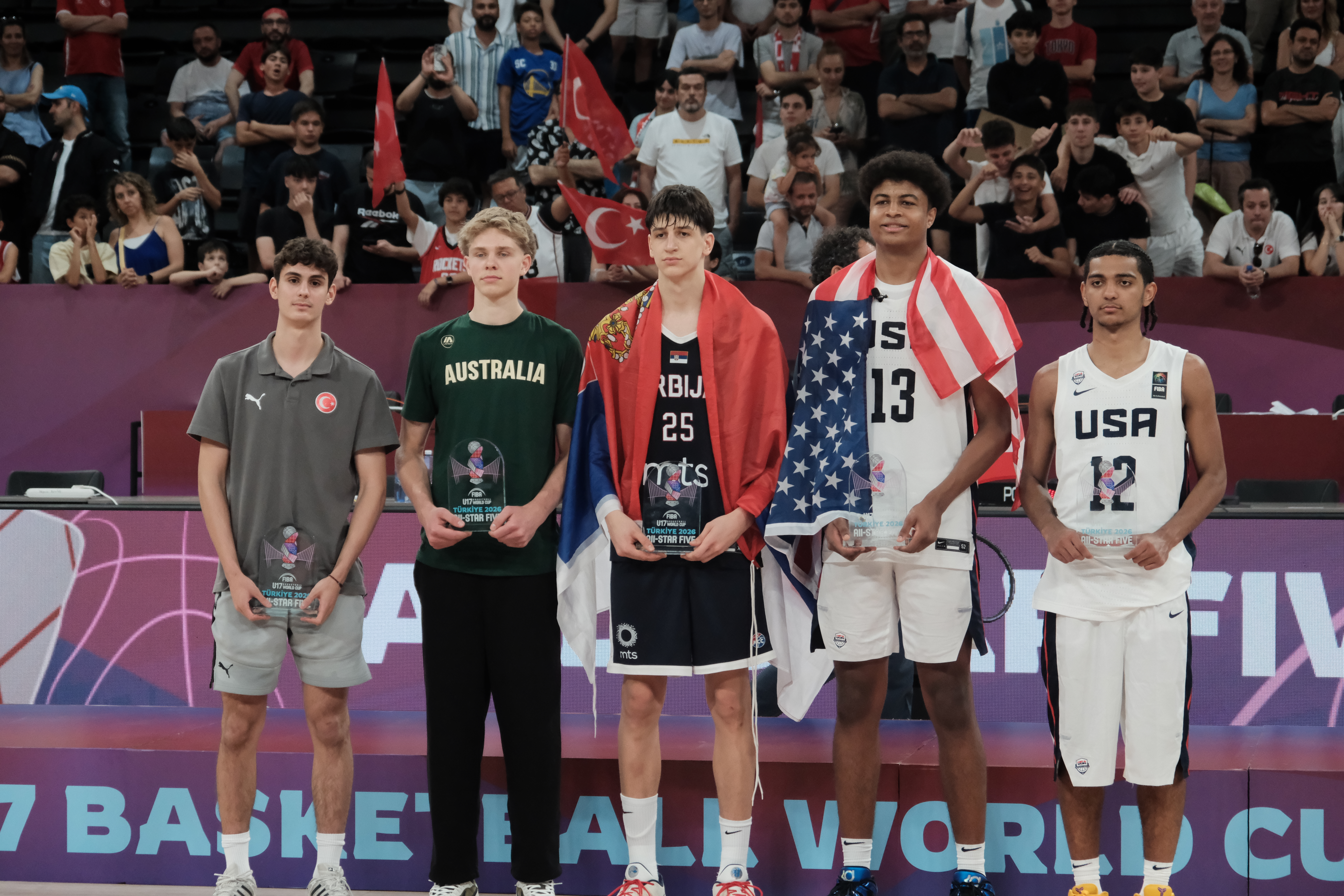

The awards were announced on 5 July 2026.

All-Star Five
Guards	Forwards	Center
(United States) Beckham Black (Turkey) Ömer Kutluay (Australia) Luke Paul	(Serbia) Nikola Kusturica	(United States) Joaquim Boumtje-Boumtje
MVP: (United States) Joaquim Boumtje-Boumtje
All-Second Team
Guards	Forwards	Center
(Turkey) Darius Karutasu (Puerto Rico) DJ Gaines (Serbia) Matija Lukić	(United States) CJ Rosser (France) Nathan Soliman	N/A
Best defensive player: (Serbia) Nikola Kusturica
Best coach: (Serbia) Stevan Mijović
