= Marcus Spears Jr. =

American basketball player (born 2009)

No. 31 – Texas Longhorns
- Position: Power forward
- League: Southeastern Conference

Personal information
- Born: April 8, 2009 (age 17) Dallas, Texas, U.S.
- Listed height: 6 ft 9 in (2.06 m)
- Listed weight: 206 lb (93 kg)

Career information
- High school: Dynamic Prep (Irving, Texas)
- College: Texas (2026–present)
Medals
Men's basketball
Representing the United States
FIBA U16 AmeriCup
Gold medal – first place	2025 Juárez	Team

Marcus Spears Jr. (born April 8, 2009) is an American college basketball player for the Texas Longhorns of the Southeastern Conference (SEC). He was a five-star recruit and one of the top prospects in the class of 2026, following his reclassification from the class of 2027.

== Early life ==
Spears was born on April 8, 2009, and grew up in Plano, Texas. He is the son of former NFL player Marcus Spears and WNBA player Aiysha Smith, both of whom were first-round draft picks in their sports. His older sister, Cari, is a college volleyball player for the Texas Longhorns and was ranked the number one recruit in the class of 2025. Spears grew up playing basketball and entered Dynamic Prep, a program based in Irving, Texas, and run by former NBA player Jermaine O'Neal, as a high school freshman.

Spears averaged 6.3 points and 5.3 rebounds per game as a sophomore at Dynamic Prep in 2024–25, then had 15.1 points and 7.6 rebounds per game as a junior. He was a top player for team Drive Nation in the Nike Elite Youth Basketball League (EYBL), averaging 20 points, 9.7 rebounds and 1.5 blocks in the spring of 2026.

Spears was a consensus five-star recruit and one of the top prospects in the class of 2027. By midway through his junior year, he had received over 20 scholarship offers, many from Power Four programs. He was ranked the number one prospect nationally by ESPN and 247Sports and a top-five prospect by Rivals.com in the class of 2027. On July 9, 2026, Spears reclassified to the class of 2026 and committed to the Texas Longhorns.

== College career ==
Spears made his college debut in the first game of the 2026-27 season, recording 11 points, five rebounds, four blocks, and one assist in 20 minutes of play.

== International career ==
In 2024 and 2025, Spears participated at the U.S. junior national team minicamp in Colorado. He was named to the U.S. national under-16 basketball team for the 2025 FIBA U16 AmeriCup, where he won a gold medal. Spears led the team with an average of 14 points per game and also posted 6.5 rebounds per game, 12 steals and 11 blocks. He was named to the tournament all-star team for his performance.
