= United States men's national under-17 basketball team =

United States
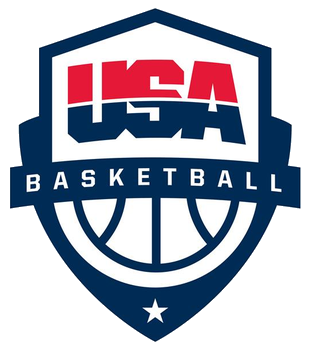
- FIBA zone: FIBA Americas
- National federation: USA Basketball
- Coach: Scott Fitch

FIBA Under-17 World Cup
- Appearances: 8
- Medals: Gold: (2010, 2012, 2014, 2016, 2018, 2022, 2024, 2026)

FIBA Under-16 AmeriCup
- Appearances: 9
- Medals: Gold: (2009, 2011, 2013, 2015, 2017, 2019, 2021, 2023, 2025)
Medal record
FIBA Under-17 World Cup
Gold medal – first place	2010 Germany
Gold medal – first place	2012 Lithuania
Gold medal – first place	2014 United Arab Emirates
Gold medal – first place	2016 Spain
Gold medal – first place	2018 Argentina
Gold medal – first place	2022 Spain
Gold medal – first place	2024 Turkey
Gold medal – first place	2026 Turkey
FIBA Under-16 AmeriCup
Gold medal – first place	2009 Argentina
Gold medal – first place	2011 Mexico
Gold medal – first place	2013 Uruguay
Gold medal – first place	2015 Argentina
Gold medal – first place	2017 Formosa
Gold medal – first place	2019 Brazil
Gold medal – first place	2021 Xalapa
Gold medal – first place	2023 Yucatán
Gold medal – first place	2025 Juárez

The United States men's national under-16 and under-17 basketball team is a national basketball team of the United States, administered by USA Basketball. It represents the country in international under-16 and under-17 basketball competitions.

== Competitive record ==
=== FIBA Under-17 World Cup ===
Year	Result	Position	Pld	W	L	Ref
(Germany) 2010	Champions	1st	8	8	0	
(Lithuania) 2012	Champions	1st	8	8	0	
(United Arab Emirates) 2014	Champions	1st	7	7	0	
(Spain) 2016	Champions	1st	7	7	0	
(Argentina) 2018	Champions	1st	7	7	0	
(Spain) 2022	Champions	1st	7	7	0	
(Turkey) 2024	Champions	1st	7	7	0	
(Turkey) 2026	Champions	1st	7	7	0	
(Greece) 2028	To be determined					
Total	8 titles	8/9	58	58	0	—

=== FIBA Under-16 AmeriCup ===
Year	Result	Position	Pld	W	L	Ref
(Argentina) 2009	Champions	1st	5	5	0	
(Mexico) 2011	Champions	1st	5	5	0	
(Uruguay) 2013	Champions	1st	5	5	0	
(Argentina) 2015	Champions	1st	5	5	0	
(Argentina) 2017	Champions	1st	5	5	0	
(Brazil) 2019	Champions	1st	6	6	0	
(Mexico) 2021	Champions	1st	6	6	0	
(Mexico) 2023	Champions	1st	6	6	0	
(Mexico) 2025	Champions	1st	6	6	0	
Total	9 titles	9/9	49	49	0	—

== Current roster ==
Roster for the 2026 FIBA Under-17 Basketball World Cup:

=== Players ===
Beckham Black, Joaquim Boumtje-Boumtje, NaVorro Bowman Jr., Mason Collins, JJ Crawford, Erick Dampier Jr., Cayden Daughtry, Asa Montgomery, Jordan Page, CJ Rosser, AJ Williams and Xavier Young.

=== Coaches ===
Scott Fitch (head coach), Frank Bennett and Nick LoGalbo (assistants).

== See also ==
- United States men's national basketball team
- United States men's national under-19 basketball team
- United States women's national basketball team
- United States women's national under-19 basketball team
- United States women's national under-17 basketball team
- United States men's national 3x3 team
