= Nathan Soliman =

French basketball player (born 2009)

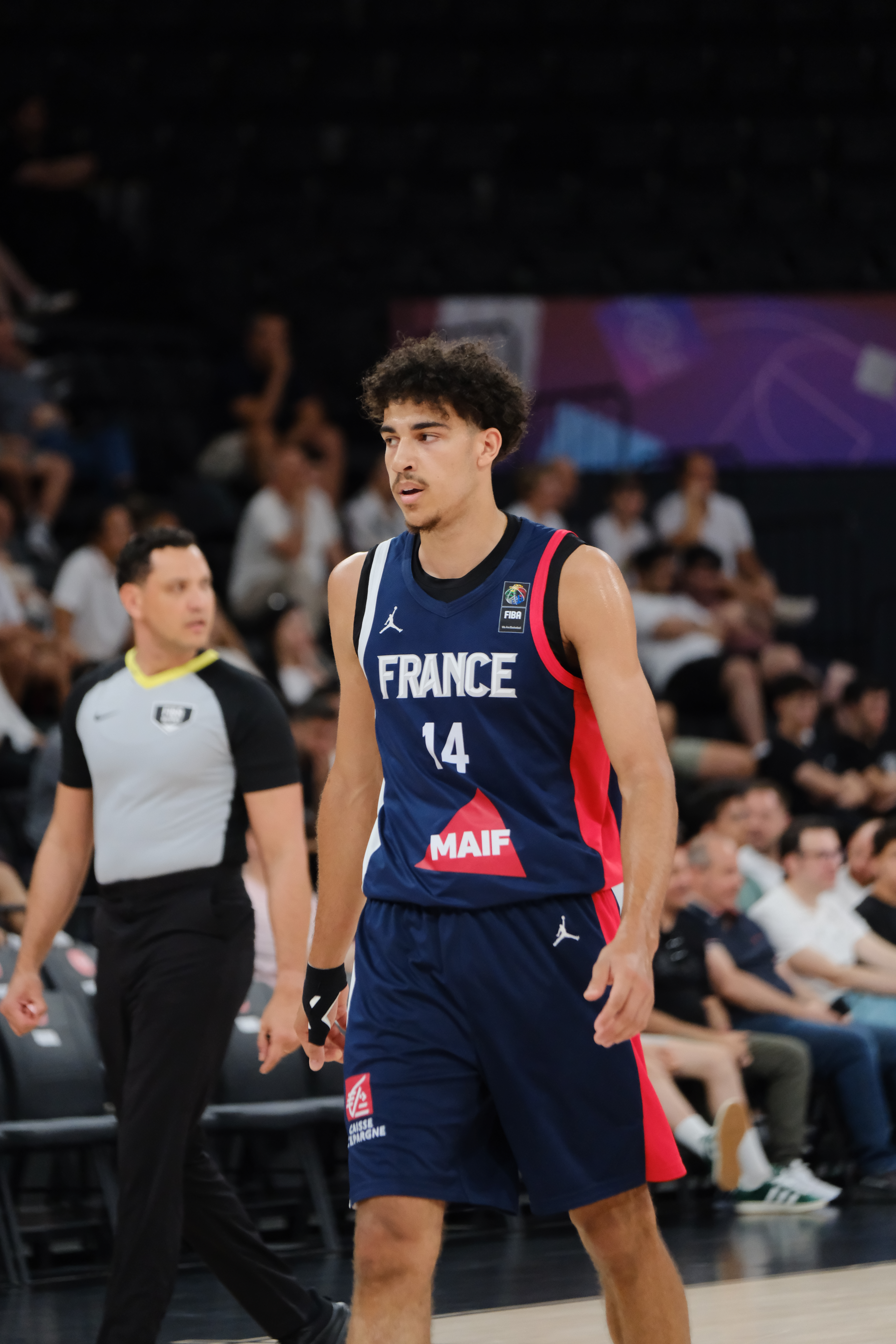
- Soliman in 2026

No. 14 – JL Bourg
- Position: Forward
- League: LNB Élite; EuroCup

Personal information
- Born: 14 May 2009 (age 17) Vichy, France
- Listed height: 6 ft 8 in (2.03 m)

Career information
- High school: INSEP (Paris, France)

Career history
- 2023–2026: Pôle France
- 2026: Nantes
- 2026–present: JL Bourg

Career highlights
- 2× LNB Young Star Game (2025, 2026)
Medals
Men's basketball
Representing France
FIBA U16 European Championship
Bronze medal – third place	2023 North Macedonia	Team

Nathan Soliman (born 14 May 2009) is a French professional basketball player for JL Bourg of the LNB Élite and the EuroCup.

== Early life ==
Soliman was born in Vichy, France, and raised in Rezé, near Nantes. Soliman tried swimming and tennis growing up. He also played handball with ASB Rezé until he switched to basketball at age nine, initially joining Rezé Basket 44. At the age of 11, Soliman was admitted to the Pôle Espoirs du Pays de la Loire, which was two years earlier than usual for the training center. He played up several age groups in the French U15 Elite league with Hermine Nantes Basket in the 2021–22 season, averaging 18.9 points per game, including a season-high of 32 points.

In 2022, he was accepted into the National Institute of Sport, Expertise, and Performance (INSEP), becoming the youngest player ever admitted to the program at 12 years old. At the time, Soliman was listed at 1.95 m (6 ft 5 in). At age 13, he joined INSEP's U18 squad.

== Professional career ==
Soliman played with the INSEP's affiliated team, Pôle France, in the third-tier Nationale Masculine 1 (NM1). He made his debut on 13 October 2023 at the age of 14, already standing 2.01 m (6 ft 7 in) tall, scoring 15 points and grabbing rebounds in an 80–66 win over Besançon AC. Soliman averaged 7.8 points and 2.5 rebounds per game in his first season. In 2024–25, he improved his averages to 10.1 points, 4.9 rebounds, and two assists per game. Soliman was one of 20 players selected to play in the inaugural LNB Young Star Game, which brought together the most promising U21 talent in the Ligue nationale de basket (LNB) system. On 17 October 2025, he scored a new career-high of 22 points in an 85–76 loss to Pays de Fougères. On 14 November, Soliman bested his career-high by putting up 27 points in a 94–85 loss to Val de Seine. In his third season in 2025–26, he averaged 15.6 points, seven rebounds, and 3.8 assists per game, and was once again selected to play in the LNB Young Star Game.

In February 2026, Soliman signed with Hermine Nantes Basket of the second-tier Élite 2, joining the club through the end of the 2025–26 season. He made his team debut the following month at age 16, scoring a game-high 21 points in a 91–75 win over Béliers de Kemper on 6 March. Soliman averaged 9.6 points, 4.2 rebounds, and 2.1 assists in 13 regular-season games played. He also helped Nantes reach the league semifinals, where they lost to Poitiers.

In June 2026, Soliman signed a three-year contract with JL Bourg of the LNB Élite. He was also heavily pursued by Cholet Basket.

== National team career ==
Soliman represented France at the 2023 FIBA U16 European Championship at age 14, winning a bronze medal. He averaged 8.3 points and 4.9 rebounds per game. The following year, Soliman played at the 2024 FIBA Under-17 World Cup. He averaged 7.3 points and 3.6 rebounds per game.

Soliman represented France at the 2025 FIBA U16 EuroBasket, joining his age group for the first time. After an exit in the quarterfinals, he recorded 26 points, 18 rebounds, four assists, and four blocks in a 95–69 win over Spain in the classification round. Soliman averaged 20 points, 10 rebounds, 2.3 assists, and a tournament-leading 1.9 blocks per game, helping his team to a fifth-place finish. He subsequently earned tournament All-Star Five honors.

The following year, Soliman represented France at the 2026 FIBA Under-17 World Cup, becoming just the third player to play at two editions of the tournament (after Ahmed Khalaf and Koa Peat). He posted 37 points, 12 rebounds, four steals, and three assists in a 97–76 win over Canada in the fifth-place game. Soliman averaged 17.6 points, seven rebounds, and 2.9 assists per game. He earned second-team all-tournament honors.

== Personal life ==
Both of Soliman's parents were professional basketball players; his father, William, played in the EuroLeague and represented the France national team, while his mother, Séverine, played up to the women's second division. He has a younger brother, Raphaël, who also plays basketball.

Soliman, who grew up in Nantes area, returned to Nantes with Hermine Nantes Basket in 2026; he said that he "consider[ed] [him]self a Nantes native", while adding: "Returning to my roots feels great."
