= AJ Williams =

American basketball player (born 2009)

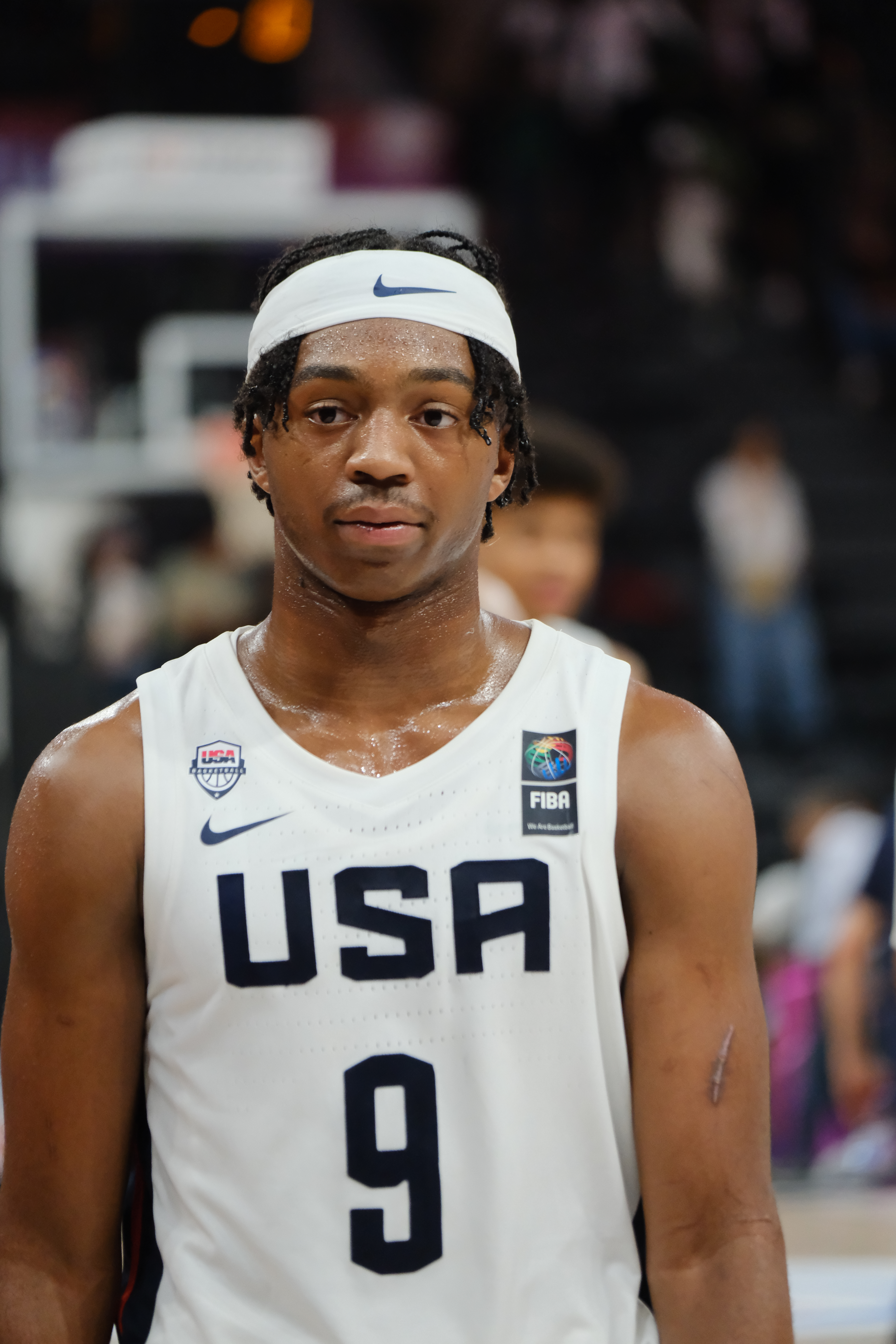
- Williams representing the USA in 2026

No. 4 – ELCA Chargers
- Position: Small forward

Personal information
- Born: June 28, 2009 (age 17)
- Listed height: 6 ft 7 in (2.01 m)
- Listed weight: 200 lb (91 kg)

Career information
- High school: Dutchtown (Hampton, Georgia) Eagle's Landing Christian Academy (McDonough, Georgia)
Medals
Representing the United States
Men's basketball
FIBA Under-17 World Cup
Gold medal – first place	2026 Turkey	Team
FIBA Under-16 AmeriCup
Gold medal – first place	2025 Mexico	Team

Anthony Williams Jr. (born June 28, 2009) is an American high school basketball player who attends Eagle's Landing Christian Academy in metro Atlanta, Georgia. He is a consensus five-star recruit in the class of 2027, and was the No. 1 overall ranked player in 2028 before reclassifying.

== Early life ==
AJ Williams was born on June 28, 2009, the son of Crystal and Anthony Williams Sr. His father played basketball for the Vanderbilt Commodores and his mother for the Auburn Montgomery Warhawks, where she was inducted into the hall of fame. Williams first attended Dutchtown High School in Hampton, Georgia, as a freshman, before transferring to Eagle's Landing Christian Academy in McDonough, Georgia, in 2025. As a freshman, Williams averaged 17.3 points and 7.5 rebounds per game, while leading the Bulldogs to a 26–4 record. As a sophomore, he averaged 31.8 points and 12.7 rebounds per game in his first season at ELCA. Williams also played in the Nike Elite Youth Basketball League (EYBL) for the Georgia Stars in the 15U division, leading his team to the peach jam championship in 2025. The following year, Williams moved up to the 17U division to play for Chris Paul and team CP3.

In October 2025, Williams debuted as the No. 1 ranked player in the class of 2028 by 247Sports. Following his sophomore season, Williams was rated as a five-star recruit and ranked No. 1 overall in the nation in the class of 2028 by ESPN, Rivals and 247Sports. In May 2026, he had over 20 NCAA Division I offers and reported being recruited most actively by Duke, Georgia and Auburn, while mentioning the possibility of reclassifying to 2027. On August 4, 2026, Williams did reclassify, remaining ranked in the top 10 by each major outlet; No. 4 Rivals, No. 5 by 247Sports and No. 7 by ESPN. In addition to the aforementioned three teams, his final list included BYU, Georgia Tech, Illinois, Mississippi State, North Carolina and UConn.

== National team career ==
In October 2024, Williams first attended the USA Basketball Junior National Team minicamp in Colorado Springs, Colorado. In June 2025, he represented United States national team in the FIBA Under-16 AmeriCup in Mexico. Williams helped lead the USA to a gold medal, averaging 13.5 points and a team-high 7.8 rebounds per game. He earned second-team all-tournament honors for his performance. In June 2026, he represented the United States in the FIBA Under-17 World Cup in Turkey. Williams again helped lead the USA to a gold medal, averaging 14.0 points and 6.6 rebounds per game, while shooting 42.4% from three-point range. He ranked third on the team in scoring.
