= Jayden Cecil =

Australian-New Zealand basketball player (born 2009)

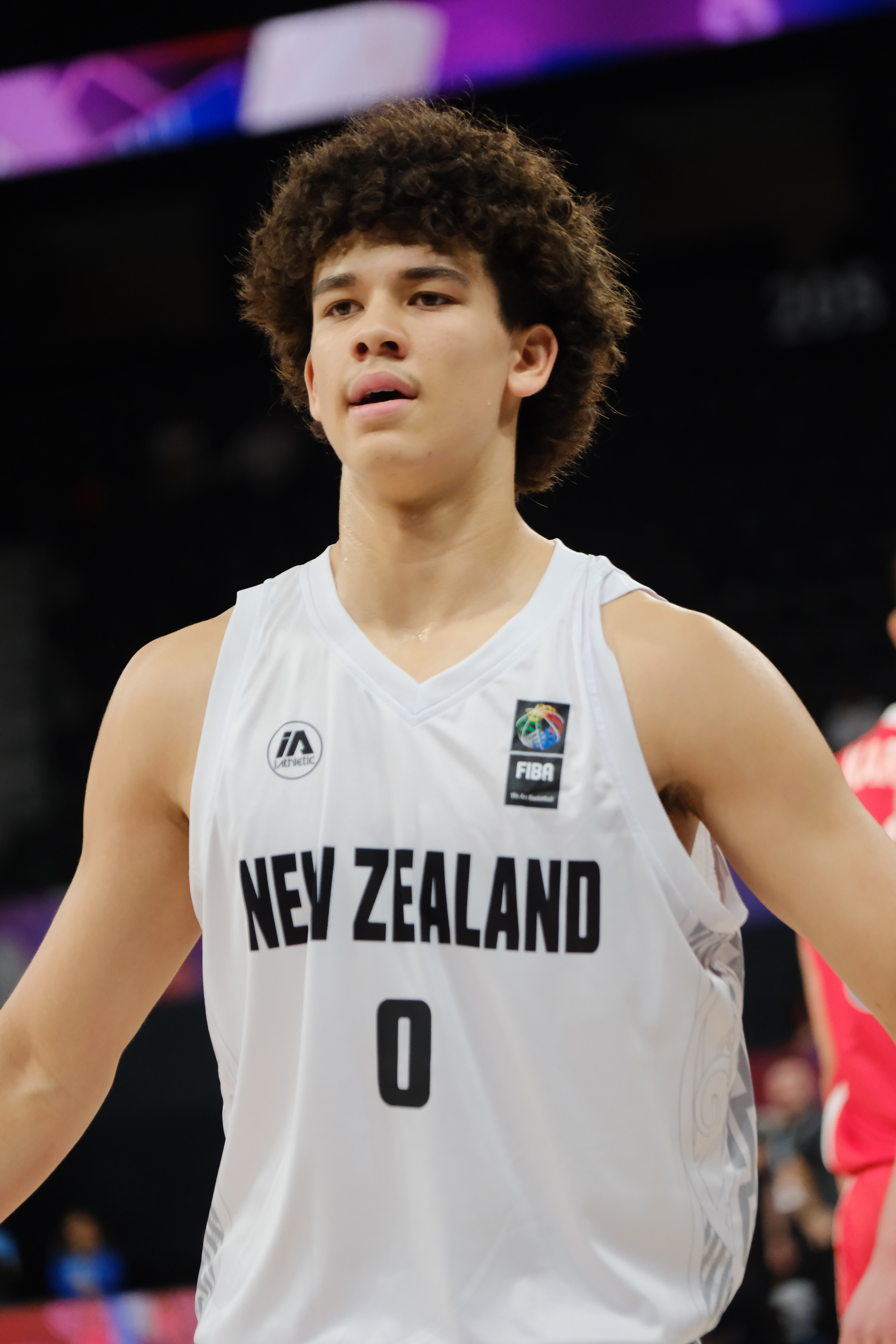
- Cecil representing New Zealand in 2026

No. 0 – Utah Prep
- Position: Point guard / shooting guard

Personal information
- Born: February 23, 2009 (age 17) Brisbane, Queensland, Australia
- Listed height: 6 ft 5 in (1.96 m)
- Listed weight: 180 lb (82 kg)

Career information
- High school: Utah Prep Academy (Hurricane, Utah)

Jayden Cecil (born February 23, 2009) is an Australian-New Zealand high school basketball player who attends Utah Prep Academy in Hurricane, Utah, United States. He is a four-star recruit in the class of 2028. Despite being born in Australia, Cecil represents New Zealand in international competition, where he led the 2026 FIBA Under-17 World Cup in scoring with 29.9 points per game.

== Early life ==
Cecil was born on February 23, 2009, in Brisbane, Queensland, Australia. His father is half Māori and half Cook Islander, and his mother is half Australian and half South African. At 15 years old in 2024, Cecil moved to the United States to attend Utah Prep Academy in Hurricane, Utah to further establish his basketball career and because he is a member of The Church of Jesus Christ of Latter-day Saints. In his first season, he played with first overall NBA draft selection, AJ Dybantsa. Before moving to Utah, Cecil played his junior basketball on the Gold Coast and for the Logan Thunder youth program. Heading into his junior season of high school at Utah Prep, he was rated as a four-star recruit and ranked No. 51 overall in the nation by ESPN. He also held NCAA Division I offers from Arizona State, Iowa State, Pepperdine, and Cal. In June 2026, Cecil represented the NBL Next Stars Program youth team, which won the 2026 Adidas EuroCamp in Italy.

== National team career ==
Cecil first represented the New Zealand national team in the 2026 FIBA Under-17 Basketball World Cup, where he led the tournament in scoring with 29.9 points per game. It was the second highest average in the history of the World Cup and Cecil was labeled by FIBA as one of the brightest breakouts. In his New Zealand debut, he scored 42 points against Turkey, which was the third highest single-game total of all time. He followed that with additional performances of 37 points against silver medalist, Serbia, and 38 points against Ivory Coast. Cecil also finished averaging 5.3 rebounds, 2.9 assists and 1.0 steals per game.
