= Nike Elite Youth Basketball League =

Basketball circuit for teams of players aged 17 and under

Nike Elite Youth Basketball League (EYBL)
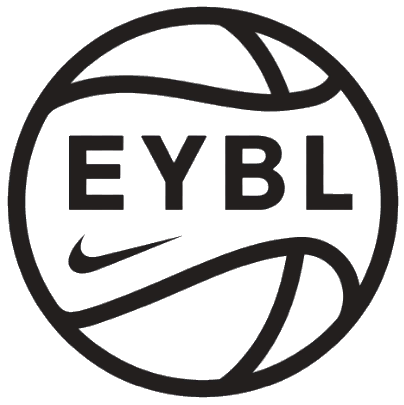
- Organizing body: Nike
- Founded: April 2010; 16 years ago
- Country: United States
- Website: nikeeyb.com nikeeyblscholastic.com

The Nike Elite Youth Basketball League (EYBL) is a basketball AAU circuit for teams of players under 17 years old and a scholastic high school league. The circuit was founded in 2010 and is composed of AAU travel teams. Both boys and girls play in the EYBL circuit in their respective categories, while only the boys have a scholastic league. The EYBL is considered one of the top youth basketball circuits in the United States, and includes one Canadian team. The scholastic league was founded in 2023 and is the top high school conference in the nation, with 15 teams across the country representing the league.

== History ==
The EYBL circuit was established in April 2010 with the aim of uniting AAU travel teams and establishing a national championship for youth teams. The EYBL is played in different sessions in different cities across the United States. 42 teams played in the first edition, including the league's singular Canadian team, CIA Bounce. In later editions, other classes such as 16U (for players aged 16 and under) were created. NBA player Chris Paul signed up his AAU team, CP3 All-Stars, for the EYBL; Russell Westbrook also has his team, Team Why Not?. Other teams include Team Thad, owned by Thaddeus Young; Team Melo (Carmelo Anthony), and Team Durant (Kevin Durant). In May 2018, player James Hampton of Team United of North Carolina collapsed and died during an EYBL circuit game in Hampton, Virginia.

== EYBL circuit ==
The EYBL comprises over 40 premier high school basketball circuit teams in America, including one Canadian team. The Peach Jam basketball tournament is played each July, serving as the annual EYBL circuit finals. The Peach Jam is played at the Riverview Park Activities Center in North Augusta, South Carolina. It was founded in 1996 as the Nike Peach Basket Classic, before changing the name to the Nike Peach Jam in 1997. It has been included in the EYBL circuit since the league’s inception in 2010. There are under-17, under-16 and under-15 editions of the Peach Jam each year.

=== Current EYBL members (2026) ===
The 17U EYBL includes 34 teams: AB Elite, Arizona Unity, Brad Beal Elite, City Rocks, CP3, Drive Nation, Expressions, Florida Rebels, Indy Heat, Jet Academy, JL3, Kingdom Hoops, LivOn, MeanStreets, Middleton Hoops, Mokan Elite, Nightrydas, NY Lightning, NY Rens, Oakland Soldiers, PG Elite, Pro Skills, PSA Cardinals, Team Durant, Team Final, Team Herro, Team Melo, Team Takeover, Team Thad, Team United, Team Why Not, UPlay Canada, Utah Prospects, Vegas Elite. The 16U EYBL has 46 members; including the 17U programs (with the exception of the EYCL call-up Kingdom Hoops), the additional teams include Alabama Fusion, All Ohio, AOT, Boo Williams, Georgia Stars, Houston Hoops, Howard Pulley, Legynds, Mac Irvin Fire, NJ Scholars, NW Rotary Rebels, Phoenix United and The Family. The 15U EYBL has 48 members; including the 16U programs, the two additional teams are Bates Fundamentals and Twelve Time. There is also a Nike JR EYBL for 14U & 13U divisions, as well as a Nike EYBL Champions League (EYCL), which serves as a lower tier, entry level league with a chance to earn a spot in the main EYBL.

=== Peach Jam tournament champions ===
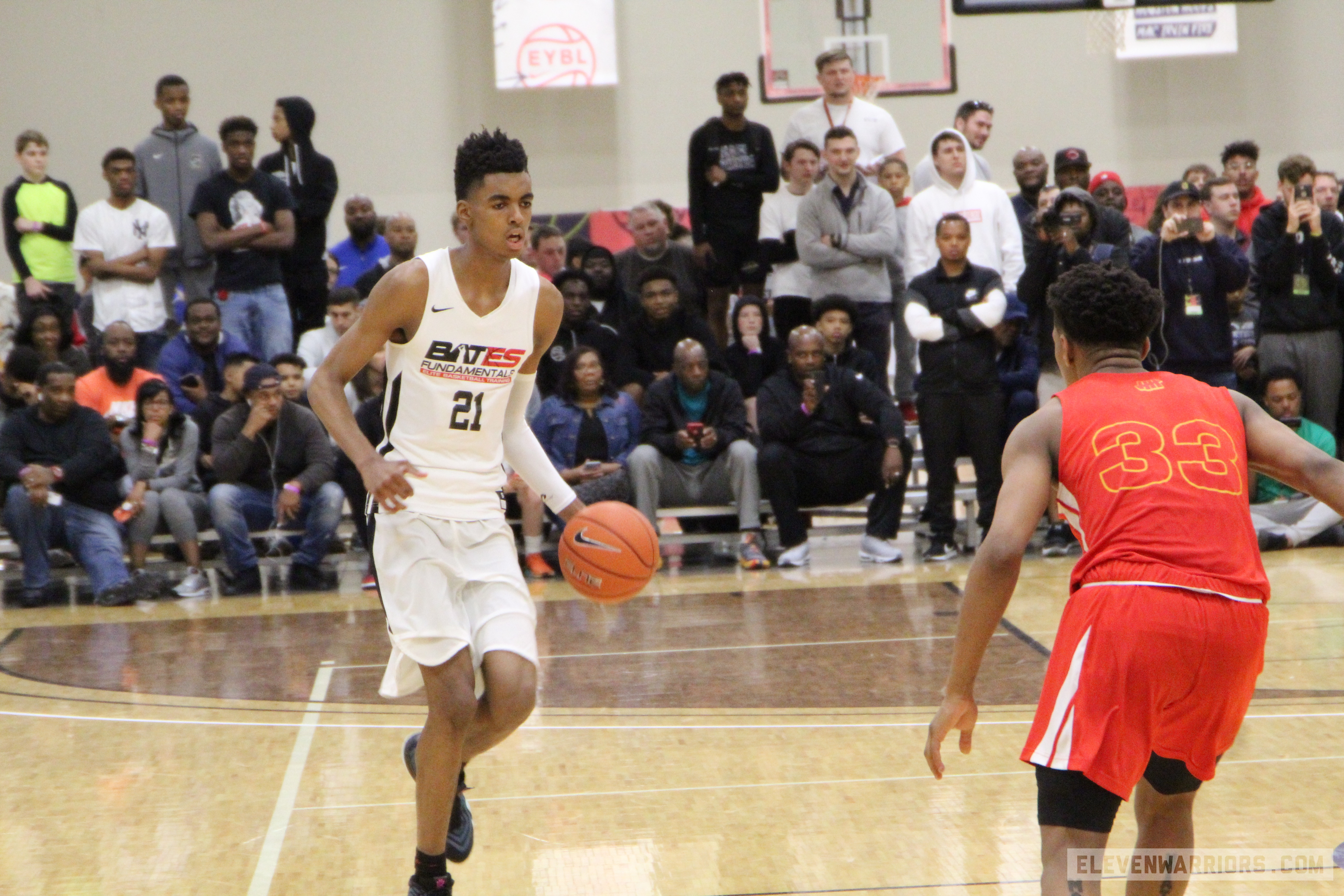
An EYBL game played in Westfield, Indiana in May 2019

==== 17U Boys ====
Year	Winner	Score	Runner-up
1996	NY Riverside Church		
1997	Illinois Warriors		
1998	Houston Jaguars		
1999	NY Riverside Church		
2000	Wisconsin Playground		
2001	Team Texas		
2002	All Ohio		
2003	New York Gauchos		
2004	Illinois Warriors		
2005	Boo Williams		
2006	MeanStreets		
2007	New York Gauchos		
2008	Boo Williams		
2009	All Ohio		
2010	Team Takeover	70–62	St. Louis Eagles
2011	BABC	84–67	Memphis YOMCA
2012	Oakland Soldiers	51–50	CIA Bounce
2013	E1T1	108–102	CP3 All-Stars
2014	NJ Playaz	85–83	Team Penny
2015	Georgia Stars	104–77	St. Louis Eagles
2016	Mokan Elite	93–65	PSA Cardinals
2017	Oakland Soldiers	70–63	Team Takeover
2018	Team Takeover	96–78	Team Why Not
2019	Mokan Elite	85–84	Team Why Not
2020	No Contest (Pandemic)	—	—
2021	Team Final	64-61	Brad Beal Elite
2022	Mokan Elite	53-52	Team Takeover
2023	Team Takeover	76-61	Vegas Elite
2024	Nightrydas Elite	71-62	Oakland Soldiers
2025	Brad Beal Elite	75-55	NY Rens
2026	Florida Rebels	71–60	Drive Nation

- Italic years denote Peach Jam champions before the establishment of the EYBL.
- Underlined denotes the inaugural tournament champions in the Nike Peach Basket Classic before changing the name.

=== Awards ===
In 2026, inaugural first-team and MVP awards were presented directly by the EYBL.

==== 2026 17U EYBL season ====
- Cayden Daughtry (MVP)
- Beckham Black
- Dooney Johnson
- Demarcus Henry
- Lewis Uvwo

== Nike EYBL Scholastic ==
In November 2023, Nike merged with the National Interscholastic Basketball Conference (NIBC) to form the premier national conference for boys high school basketball in the United States, the Nike EYBL Scholastic. Unlike the AAU circuit, team rosters must consist of four-year high school athletes. The inaugural season in 2023–24 had 14 teams, which rose to a high of 20 teams in 2025–26, and currently sits at 15 teams. Select games are broadcast on ESPN platforms.

=== Current members (2026–27) ===
School	State/Province
AZ Compass Prep	Arizona
CIA Bella Vista	Arizona
Dream City Christian School	Arizona
Faith Family Academy	Texas
Iowa United Prep	Iowa
La Lumiere School	Indiana
Long Island Lutheran	New York
Master's Academy International	Massachusetts
Monarch Academy	Kansas
Montverde Academy	Florida
Oak Hill Academy	Virginia
Tennessee Collegiate Academy	Tennessee
The St. James Academy	Virginia
Veritas Academy	California
Wasatch Academy	Utah

==== Key ====
Denotes original member

Brewster Academy, IMG Academy, Legacy Early College, Link Academy, Orangeville Prep Academy and Sunrise Christian Academy were also original members that left the league (Dream City Christian was previously named Canyon International Academy).

== Notable players ==
These players have appeared in at least 1 NBA game.

- Bam Adebayo
- Kyle Alexander
- Grayson Allen
- Jose Alvarado
- Kyle Anderson
- Cole Anthony
- Deandre Ayton
- Udoka Azubuike
- Marvin Bagley III
- Mohamed Bamba
- Paolo Banchero
- Scottie Barnes
- RJ Barrett
- Emoni Bates
- Bradley Beal
- Malik Beasley
- Antonio Blakeney
- Bol Bol
- Marques Bolden
- Devin Booker
- Brandon Boston Jr.
- Brian Bowen
- Tony Bradley
- Miles Bridges
- Isaiah Briscoe
- Troy Brown Jr.
- Jalen Brunson
- Thomas Bryant
- Vernon Carey Jr.
- Wendell Carter Jr.
- Josh Christopher
- Tyler Cook
- Sharife Cooper
- Cade Cunningham
- Anthony Davis
- Deyonta Davis
- Cheick Diallo
- Hamidou Diallo
- Donte DiVincenzo
- Trevon Duval
- Henry Ellenson
- Tacko Fall
- Bruno Fernando
- Cooper Flagg
- Trent Forrest
- De'Aaron Fox
- Darius Garland
- Harry Giles III
- Shai Gilgeous-Alexander
- Aaron Gordon
- Jalen Green
- Quade Green
- Jaden Hardy
- Jared Harper
- Tyler Herro
- Jonathan Isaac
- Jaren Jackson Jr.
- Bronny James
- Ty Jerome
- Jalen Johnson
- Keldon Johnson
- Keyontae Johnson
- Stanley Johnson
- Tre Jones
- Tyus Jones
- Trevor Keels
- Luke Kennard
- Kevin Knox II
- Kon Knueppel
- Skal Labissière
- Jalen Lecque
- Dereck Lively II
- Thon Maker
- KJ Martin
- Tyrese Maxey
- Jaden McDaniels
- Brandon Miller
- Malik Monk
- Wendell Moore Jr.
- Jamal Murray
- Malik Newman
- Nerlens Noel
- Zach Norvell
- Jahlil Okafor
- Jabari Parker
- Theo Pinson
- Scotty Pippen Jr.
- Jordan Poole
- Jontay Porter
- Michael Porter Jr.
- Ivan Rabb
- Julius Randle
- Cam Reddish
- Malachi Richardson
- Austin Rivers
- Mitchell Robinson
- D'Angelo Russell
- Collin Sexton
- Ben Simmons
- Dennis Smith Jr.
- Nick Smith Jr.
- Omari Spellman
- Cassius Stanley
- DJ Steward
- Isaiah Stewart
- Caleb Swanigan
- Jayson Tatum
- Gary Trent Jr.
- Allonzo Trier
- Jordan Tucker
- Jarred Vanderbilt
- Lonnie Walker IV
- Coby White
- Andrew Wiggins
- Grant Williams
- Mark Williams
- Justise Winslow
- Cassius Winston
- James Wiseman
- Trae Young
- Stephen Zimmerman
