= Luke Paul =

Australian basketball player (born 2009)

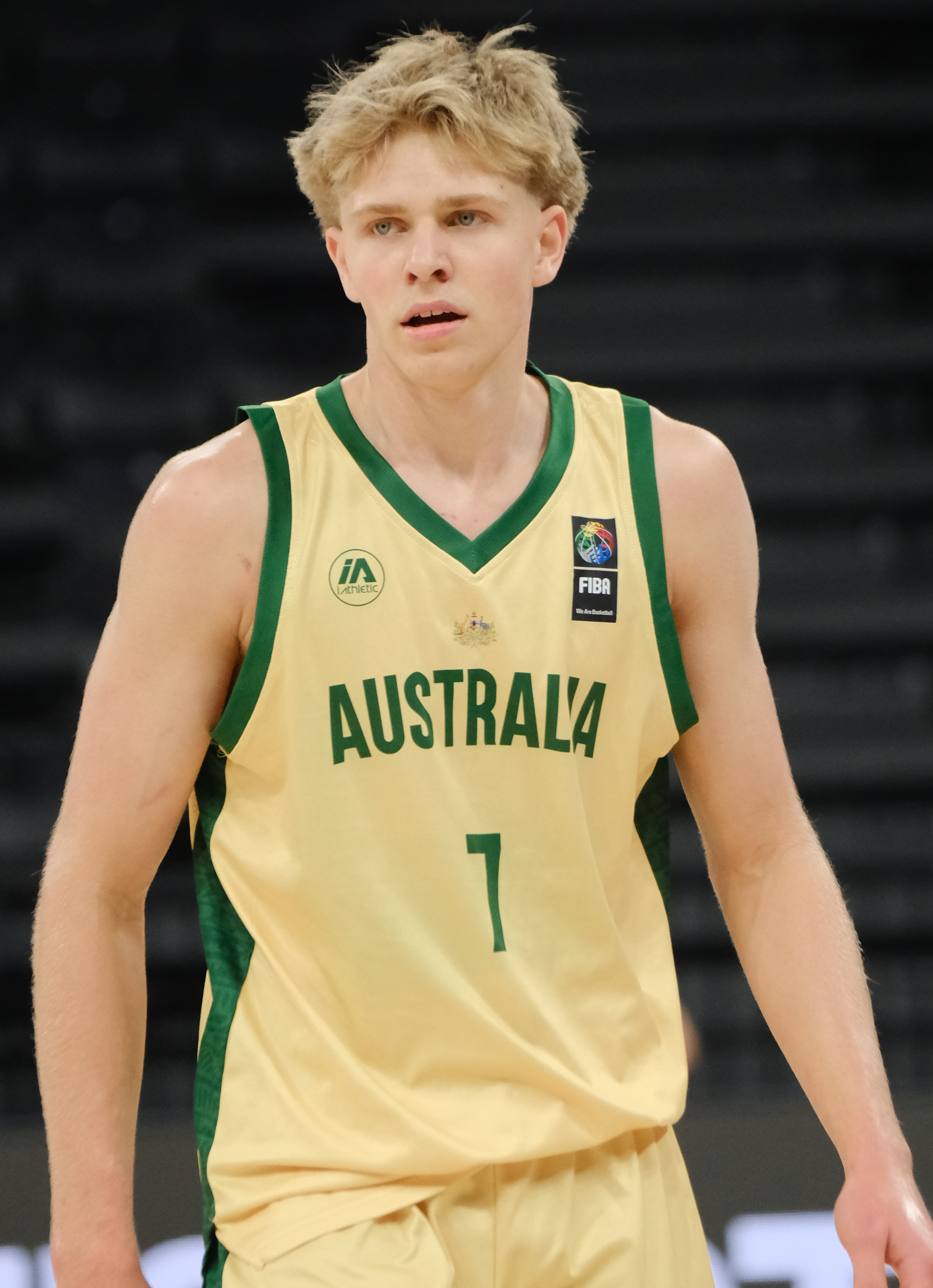
- Paul representing Australia in 2026

No. 10 – Cairns Taipans
- Position: Point guard / shooting guard
- Conference: NBL

Personal information
- Born: 20 February 2009 (age 17) Perth, Western Australia, Australia
- Listed height: 6 ft 6 in (1.98 m)
- Listed weight: 205 lb (93 kg)

Career information
- High school: Caralee Community (Perth, Western Australia); Willetton (Perth, Western Australia)
- College: Duke (commit)
- Playing career: 2024–present

Career history
- 2024–2025: Willetton Tigers
- 2026: BA Centre of Excellence
- 2026–present: Cairns Taipans

Career highlights
- FIBA U16 Asia Cup MVP (2025)
Medals
Representing the Australia
Men's basketball
FIBA Under-17 World Cup
Bronze medal – third place	2026 Turkey	Team
FIBA U17 Oceania Cup
Silver medal – second place	2025 Samoa	Team
FIBA U16 Asia Cup
Gold medal – first place	2025 Mongolia	Team
FIBA U15 Oceania Cup
Gold medal – first place	2024 Australia	Team

Luke Roland Paul (born 20 February 2009) is an Australian professional basketball player for the Cairns Taipans of the National Basketball League (NBL). He has won four medals representing Australia, including earning the 2025 FIBA U16 Asia Cup MVP and 2026 FIBA U17 World Cup All-Star Five honours. Paul will play college basketball in the United States for the Duke Blue Devils in 2027.

== Early life ==
Paul was born in Perth, Western Australia. He attended Caralee Community School and Willetton Senior High School.

== Professional career ==
Paul is a product of the Willetton Tigers of the NBL1 West, where he first signed at 14 years old and played for in 2024 and 2025. He also spent time with the Perth Wildcats Academy program. Paul accepted a scholarship with the BA Centre of Excellence (BA CoE) in Canberra on 1 August 2025.

In January 2026, Paul became the youngest player to ever sign a National Basketball League (NBL) contract through the Next Stars program, doing so at 16 years old. The previous youngest recipient was Dash Daniels. Other notable Next Stars have been LaMelo Ball, Josh Giddey, Alex Sarr and Ousmane Dieng. After signing as a Next Star, he continued to train and play with the BA CoE in the NBL1 East, while he made his decision over the next six months on which specific team he would sign with in the NBL. Additionally, Paul represented Western Australia Metro at the Under-18 National Championship in April 2026, after also having done so in 2025. With the CoE in the 2026 NBL1 season, he averaged 8.4 points, 4.3 rebounds, 3.6 assists and 1 steal in 23 minutes across 14 games.

On 11 June 2026, Paul signed with the Cairns Taipans of the NBL. Cairns players Jack McVeigh and Reyne Smith were influential in his decision to choose the Taipans, along with advice from Josh Giddey, whose game Paul has been compared to. He also had an encounter with head coach Adam Forde during the 2024–25 NBL season when the Taipans were in Perth, and he invited Paul to observe and participate in a team practice. Paul also stated the culture and the fanbase were reasons, while emphasizing that Forde had previously developed young Next Star players such as Bobi Klintman and Taran Armstrong into earning NBA opportunities. On 11 August 2026, he was sidelined for six to eight weeks after sustaining an ankle injury during a club pre-season training session. He made his NBL debut on 8 October in a 97–91 win over the Brisbane Bullets, scoring his first points in the second quarter. Following an injury to Jaylin Galloway in November, Paul entered the Taipans' starting line-up.

== College career ==
On 1 October 2026, Paul announced he was going to play college basketball in the United States at Duke University for Jon Scheyer and the Blue Devils. His commitment came just months after signing in the NBL, where he will spend one season before joining Duke in the summer of 2027. Paul is a projected lottery pick in the 2028 NBA draft.

== National team career ==
Paul first represented the Australia junior national team in the 2024 FIBA U15 Oceania Cup. He then represented in the 2025 FIBA U16 Asia Cup, where he earned All-Star Five honors and won MVP of the tournament. In the final against China, Paul had 26 points, 10 rebounds and nine assists. He averaged 14.8 points, 7.3 rebounds and 6.3 assists per game. That same year, he also was selected for the 2025 FIBA U17 Oceania Cup and earned All-Star Five honors again in 2025, cementing his status as one of the top youth basketball players. The following year, Paul played in the 2026 FIBA Under-17 Basketball World Cup, where he earned All-Star Five honors for a third consecutive international tournament after leading Australia to a bronze medal. In the bronze medal game against Turkey, Paul recorded 19 points, 10 rebounds, seven assists and three blocks. He averaged 15.3 points, 6.4 rebounds and 7.1 assists per game.

In November 2026, it was announced that Paul would debut for the Australia men's national basketball team, the Boomers, during next window of the FIBA Basketball World Cup 2027 Asian Qualifiers.
