= Sayon Keita =

Malian basketball player

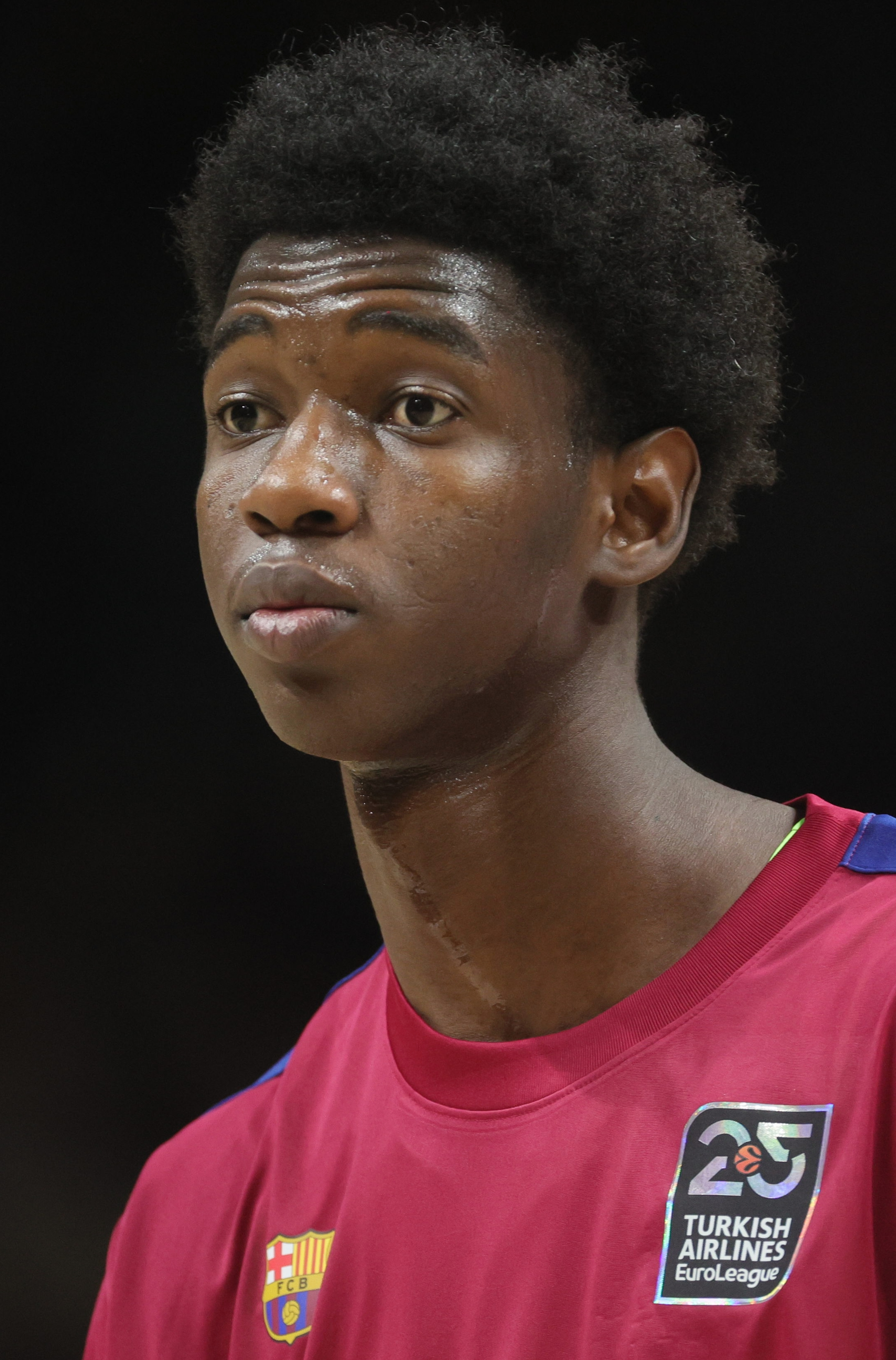
- Keita with FC Barcelona in 2025

No. 21 – North Carolina Tar Heels
- Position: Center
- League: Atlantic Coast Conference

Personal information
- Born: 1 March 2008 (age 18) Bamako, Mali
- Listed height: 7 ft 1 in (2.16 m)
- Listed weight: 93 kg (205 lb)

Career information
- College: North Carolina (2026–present)
- Playing career: 2023–present

Career history
- 2023–2026: FC Barcelona
- 2023–2026: →FC Barcelona B

Career highlights
- EuroLeague NextGen champion (2026)

Sayon Keita (born 1 March 2008), is a Malian college basketball player for the North Carolina Tar Heels of the Atlantic Coast Conference (ACC). He previously played for FC Barcelona. He also played for Barcelona's reserve team in the Liga U. Standing at 7 ft 1 in (2.16 m), Keita plays in the center position.

== Early life and youth career ==
Growing up in Bamako, Keita started playing basketball in 2020 after he was noticed in the street by staff of Dreams Academy, a youth sports development program created by the Serge Ibaka Foundation. Keita, who was 12 at the time, was subsequently offered a place at the academy due to his impressive height and agility.

After enrolling in the academy, Keita underwent a sports and nutrition program to develop as a player, in preparation for a move to Spain. In February 2022, he travelled to Spain to join the youth ranks of Movistar Estudiantes. He would sign for FC Barcelona in the summer of 2023, playing for FC Barcelona B in Tercera FEB. Keita also took part in the 2023–24 and 2024–25 editions of the Euroleague Basketball Next Generation Tournament with Barcelona. In May 2026, Keita won the 2025–26 EuroLeague NextGen Final tournament with Barcelona.

== College career ==
On April 28, 2026, Keita announced that he will be committing to University of North Carolina where he will be playing for the Tar Heels for the 2026–27 college basketball season.

== Professional career ==
Keita made his professional debut in March 2025, while still a FC Barcelona B player. He played his first minutes for the FC Barcelona first team in a Liga ACB win against CB Breogán at the Palau Blaugrana. Due to several injuries in Barcelona's roster, Keita was also called up to several EuroLeague games throughout the 2024-25 season.

On October 14, 2025, Keita made his EuroLeague debut, playing as a starter in an away win against Maccabi Tel Aviv. He managed to score four points and record two rebounds in 16 minutes played.
