= Messi Yangala =

French basketball player (born 2009)

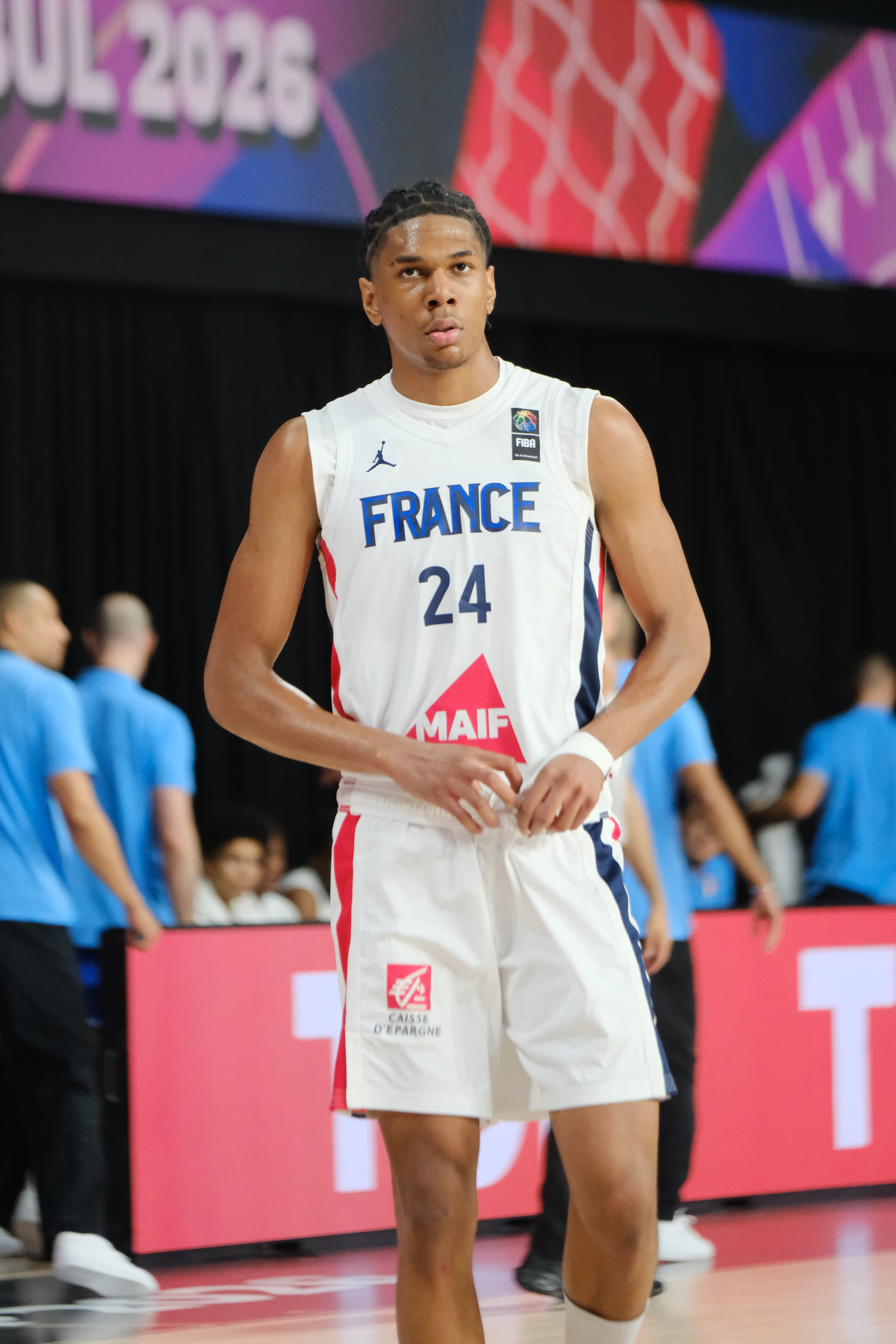
- Yangala with France in 2026

No. 24 – Cholet Basket
- Position: Forward
- League: LNB Élite

Personal information
- Born: 21 June 2009 (age 17) Châteauroux, France
- Listed height: 2.03 m (6 ft 8 in)

Career history
- 2024–2026: Pôle France
- 2026–present: Cholet Basket

Career highlights
- LNB Young Star Game (2026)

Messi Taofinu'u Yangala (born 21 June 2009) is a French professional basketball player for Cholet Basket of the LNB Élite. He has previously played for Pôle France.

== Early life ==
Yangala played youth basketball with ABC St Jean de Braye, JS Chécy Basket, and CJF Fleury-les-Aubrais. He also played two seasons in the French U15 Elite league with CTC Orléans Métropole. (Note: CTC Orléans Métropole Basket is a Coopération Territoriale de Clubs (Territorial Club Cooperation; an agreement between two clubs to combine teams) between CJF Fleury-les-Aubrais and Orléans Loiret Basket.) In 2024, Yangala was announced as one of 22 players (11 boys and 11 girls) accepted into the National Institute of Sport, Expertise, and Performance (INSEP) for the Pôle France program, including one of three from the Centre-Val de Loire region. He helped the Pôle France U18 team win the 2025–26 EuroLeague NextGen Belgrade Qualifier, earning all-tournament honors after averaging 14 points and five rebounds per game. At the 2025–26 EuroLeague NextGen Final tournament in Athens, he averaged 14 points and 7.3 rebounds per game.

== Professional career ==
Yangala debuted with Pôle France in the third-tier Nationale Masculine 1 (NM1) on 20 December 2024, scoring nine points in an 83–78 loss to Étoile Angers Basket. It was his only appearance of the 2024–25 season. Yangala recorded his first double-double on 16 December 2025, posting 17 points, 10 rebounds, and four assists in an 88–82 win over Union Rennes basket 35, which also marked Pôle France's first victory of the season. He took a leadership role on the team following the midseason departure of Nathan Soliman. Yangala scored a season-high 20 points in an 86–77 win over Metz BC on 26 April 2026. He averaged 9.9 points, 5.2 rebounds, and 1.6 assists in 26 minutes per game at 17 years old in his first full season.

Yangala was selected to play in the 2026 Ligue nationale de basket (LNB) Young Star Game. He was the youngest player named to the game's roster, as well as one of only two Pôle France players, along with Soliman.

== National team career ==
Yangala represented the France national under-15 team at the 2024 Torneo dell’Amicizia (Friendship Tournament), held in Italy. He averaged seven points per game and helped his team to a runner-up finish.

Yangala next represented France at the 2025 FIBA U16 EuroBasket. He recorded 22 points and 10 rebounds in a 90–66 win over Latvia in the fifth-place game, which secured France's spot in the following year's FIBA Under-17 World Cup. Yangala averaged 13 points and 6.7 rebounds per game, which ranked third and second on the team, respectively. He also led the tournament with 1.9 blocks per game.

The following year, Yangala represented France at the 2026 FIBA Under-17 World Cup, which marked the coaching debut of Tony Parker. He averaged 12.7 points and 6.3 rebounds per game, helping France to a fifth-place finish.

== Personal life ==
Yangala grew up in Saint-Jean-de-Braye and Fay-aux-Loges. He was inspired by his favorite player, Kevin Durant, as well as Michael Jordan.
