= 2025–26 EuroLeague Basketball Next Generation Tournament =

24th season of the European premier youth basketball tournament

ANGT
- Season: 2025–26
- Duration: 5 February–24 May 2026
- Teams: 28

Finals
- Champions: (Spain) FC Barcelona (2nd)
- Runners-up: (Spain) Real Madrid
- Finals MVP: (United States) Joaquim Boumtje-Boumtje (FC Barcelona)

The 2025–26 Euroleague Basketball Next Generation Tournament, also called Adidas Next Generation Tournament for sponsorship reasons, was the 24th edition of the international junior basketball tournament organized by Euroleague Basketball.

The competition's final tournament was held in Athens in May 2026, with FC Barcelona obtaining its second title.

== Teams ==
In this edition, the number of the participating under-18 teams was 28. They played in four qualifying tournaments between February and March 2026. The tournaments were held in Ulm, Abu Dhabi, Bologna and Belgrade.

(Spain) FC Barcelona	(France) Paris Basketball	(Greece) Olympiacos Piraeus	(Israel) Hapoel Tel Aviv
(Spain) Fundación Baskonia-Alavés	Pôle France INSEP	(Greece) Panathinaikos Athens	(Israel) Maccabi Tel Aviv
(Spain) Occident Bàsquet Manresa	(Serbia) Crvena zvezda	(Italy) EA7 Emporio Armani Milano	(Lithuania) Žalgiris
(Spain) Real Madrid	(Serbia) FMP Belgrade	(Italy) Dolomiti Energia Trento	(Slovenia) Cedevita Olimpija
(Spain) Valencia Basket	(Serbia) Mega Super Belgrade	(Italy) Virtus Bologna	(Turkey) Anadolu Efes
(France) AS Monaco	(Serbia) Partizan Mozzart Bet	(Germany) FC Bayern Munich	(United Arab Emirates) Dubai Basketball
(France) LDLC ASVEL	(Greece) Aris Thessaloniki	(Germany) ratiopharm Ulm	(United Kingdom) London Lions

== Qualifying tournaments ==
=== Ulm, Germany ===
Germany
- 6–7 February 2026

The first qualifying tournament featured hosts Next Gen Team Ulm and ratiopharm Ulm, as well as Cedevita Olimpija, EA7 Emporio Armani Milano, LDLC ASVEL Villeurbanne, Mega Super Belgrade, Occident Bàsquet Manresa, Olympiacos Piraeus. Cedevita Olimpija defeated Mega Super Belgrade 82–73 in the final and advanced to the final tournament.

==== Group A ====
Pos	Team	Pld	W	L	PF	PA	PD	Qualification
1	(Slovenia) Cedevita Olimpija	3	2	1	244	226	+18	Final
2	(Germany) ratiopharm Ulm	3	2	1	233	240	−7	3rd place game
3	(Italy) EA7 Emporio Armani Milano	3	1	2	253	239	+14	5th place game
4	(Europe) Next Gen Team Ulm	3	1	2	215	240	−25	7th place game

Source: euroleaguebasketball.net

6 February 2026
9:00 CET

Boxscore

Cedevita Olimpija (Slovenia)	87–78	(Italy) EA7 Emporio Armani Milano
Scoring by quarter: 20–24, 30–18, 21–17, 16–19
Pts: Houindo 33; Rebs: Ciperle 14; Asts: Ciperle 6		Pts: Manfredotti 18; Rebs: Chouenkam 5 Asts: Chauveau 6

Orange Campus, Ulm
Attendance: 0 (tentative)
Referees: Marli Kasemi, Edris Naim, David Messmer

6 February 2026
11:15 CET

Boxscore

ratiopharm Ulm (Germany)	75–73	(Europe) Next Gen Team Ulm
Scoring by quarter: 23–13, 16–17, 16–19, 20–24
Pts: Miličić 21; Rebs: Kiehlneker 9 Asts: four players 2		Pts: Edoka 20; Rebs: Kröger 6 Asts: three players 3

Orange Campus, Ulm
Attendance: 0 (tentative)
Referees: Tobias Kazda, Nils Kremer, Luisa Schumacher

6 February 2026
18:00 CET

Boxscore

Next Gen Team Ulm (Europe)	74–72	(Slovenia) Cedevita Olimpija
Scoring by quarter: 16–22, 19–10, 21–20, 18–20
Pts: Waerniers 16; Rebs: Kröger 12; Asts: Edoka 5		Pts: Kolka 16; Rebs: Gueye 10; Asts: Ciperle, Kolka 3

Orange Campus, Ulm
Attendance: 0 (tentative)
Referees: Edris Naim, Nils Kremer, Luisa Schumacher

6 February 2026
20:15 CET

Boxscore

ratiopharm Ulm (Germany)	84–82	(Italy) EA7 Emporio Armani Milano
Scoring by quarter: 22–26, 27–18, 17–19, 18–19
Pts: Brutāns 18; Rebs: Miličić 7 Asts: Miličić 7		Pts: Chauveau 18; Rebs: three players 5 Asts: Costaglione 10

Orange Campus, Ulm
Attendance: 0 (tentative)
Referees: Marli Kasemi, Tobias Kazda, Eva-Marie Bohn

7 February 2026
13:30 CET

Boxscore

Next Gen Team Ulm (Europe)	68–93	(Italy) EA7 Emporio Armani Milano
Scoring by quarter: 11–28, 21–17, 17–24, 19–24
Pts: Kouame-Zeze 16; Rebs: Waerniers, Yıldız 7 Asts: four players 2		Pts: Gulić 14; Rebs: Mbow 9 Asts: Costaglione 7

Orange Campus, Ulm
Attendance: 0 (tentative)
Referees: Tobias Kazda, David Messmer, Hendrik Herter

7 February 2026
15:45 CET

Boxscore

ratiopharm Ulm (Germany)	74–85	(Slovenia) Cedevita Olimpija
Scoring by quarter: 20–24, 30–18, 21–17, 16–19
Pts: Miličić 25; Rebs: Slingerland 7 Asts: Miličić 4		Pts: Ciperle 30; Rebs: Ciperle, Houindo 7 Asts: Ciperle, Pregl 4

Orange Campus, Ulm
Attendance: 0 (tentative)
Referees: Marli Kasemi, Luisa Schumacher, Nils Kremer

==== Group B ====
Pos	Team	Pld	W	L	PF	PA	PD	Qualification
1	(Serbia) Mega Super Belgrade	3	3	0	301	218	+83	Final
2	(France) LDLC ASVEL	3	2	1	254	246	+8	3rd place game
3	(Spain) Occident Bàsquet Manresa	3	1	2	233	279	−46	5th place game
4	(Greece) Olympiacos Piraeus	3	0	3	241	286	−45	7th place game

Source: euroleaguebasketball.net

6 February 2026
13:30 CET

Boxscore

Occident Bàsquet Manresa (Spain)	71–88	(France) LDLC ASVEL
Scoring by quarter: 24–13, 15–27, 20–19, 12–29
Pts: Fernández 13; Rebs: Dolo 11; Asts: Sánchez 4		Pts: Wade 25; Rebs: Loussavouvou 6 Asts: Wade 7

Orange Campus, Ulm
Attendance: 0 (tentative)
Referees: Dogu Berk Innal, Eva-Marie Bohn, Hendrik Herter

6 February 2026
15:45 CET

Boxscore

Mega Super Belgrade (Serbia)	101–75	(Greece) Olympiacos Piraeus
Scoring by quarter: 27–21, 26–20, 23–20, 25–14
Pts: Karalić 19; Rebs: Bjelica 13; Asts: Savić 7		Pts: Chaidemenos 20; Rebs: three players 6 Asts: Chaidemenos 5

Orange Campus, Ulm
Attendance: 0 (tentative)
Referees: Jens Rupprecht, Nemanja Damjanovic, David Messmer

7 February 2026
9:00 CET

Boxscore

Olympiacos Piraeus (Greece)	83–84	(France) LDLC ASVEL
Scoring by quarter: 26–26, 24–15, 18–23, 15–20
Pts: Chaidemenos, Papaioannou 17; Rebs: Bouzoulas, Gkikas 6 Asts: Chaidemenos 4		Pts: Risal 18; Rebs: Bassoumba 10; Asts: Loussavouvou 6

Orange Campus, Ulm
Attendance: 0 (tentative)
Referees: Dogu Berk Innal, Nils Kremer, Nemanja Damjanovic

7 February 2026
11:15 CET

Boxscore

Occident Bàsquet Manresa (Spain)	61–108	(Serbia) Mega Super Belgrade
Scoring by quarter: 15–28, 20–25, 9–27, 17–28
Pts: Dolo, Jekabsons 9 Rebs: Fernández 6 Asts: Sánchez 5		Pts: Danilović 16; Rebs: Pavlović 8 Asts: Stepanović 6

Orange Campus, Ulm
Attendance: 0 (tentative)
Referees: Jens Rupprecht, Edris Naim, Eva-Marie Bohn

7 February 2026
18:00 CET

Boxscore

Mega Super Belgrade (Serbia)	92–82	(France) LDLC ASVEL
Scoring by quarter: 25–22, 20–22, 22–15, 22–23
Pts: Karalić 21; Rebs: Bjelica 9 Asts: Savić 10		Pts: Risal 15; Rebs: Bassoumba 11; Asts: Loussavouvou 8

Orange Campus, Ulm
Attendance: 0 (tentative)
Referees: Edris Naim, Dogu Berk Innal, Nemanja Damjanovic

7 February 2026
20:15 CET

Boxscore

Olympiacos Piraeus (Greece)	83–101	(Spain) Occident Bàsquet Manresa
Scoring by quarter: 22–29, 21–22, 17–25, 23–25
Pts: Papaioannou 20; Rebs: Bouzoulas 6 Asts: Chaidemenos, Nikolaou 3		Pts: Muncunill 19; Rebs: Muncunill 10; Asts: three players 5

Orange Campus, Ulm
Attendance: 0 (tentative)
Referees: Jens Rupprecht, Hendrik Herter, Eva-Marie Bohn

==== 7th place game ====
8 February 2026
9:00 CET

Boxscore

Next Gen Team Ulm (Europe)	89–77	(Greece) Olympiacos Piraeus
Scoring by quarter: 17–28, 27–13, 22–14, 23–22
Pts: Yıldız 22; Rebs: Kröger 14; Asts: de la Iglesia 8		Pts: Papaioannou 20; Rebs: Touris 15; Asts: Nikolaou 3

Orange Campus, Ulm
Attendance: 0 (tentative)
Referees: Dogu Berk Innal, Marli Kasemi, Luisa Schumacher

==== 5th place game ====
8 February 2026
11:15 CET

Boxscore

EA7 Emporio Armani Milano (Italy)	61–75	(Spain) Occident Bàsquet Manresa
Scoring by quarter: 13–24, 14–13, 19–21, 15–17
Pts: Compaore 12; Rebs: Gulić 8 Asts: Chauveau 4		Pts: Sánchez 16; Rebs: Dolo 11; Asts: Sánchez 4

Orange Campus, Ulm
Attendance: 0 (tentative)
Referees: Edris Naim, David Messmer, Nemanja Damjanovic

==== 3rd place game ====
8 February 2026
13:30 CET

Boxscore

ratiopharm Ulm (Germany)	92–84	(France) LDLC ASVEL
Scoring by quarter: 21–22, 26–19, 16–20, 29–23
Pts: Miličić 23; Rebs: Miličić 9 Asts: Miličić 11		Pts: Loussavouvou 19; Rebs: Bassoumba 9 Asts: Loussavouvou 7

Orange Campus, Ulm
Attendance: 0 (tentative)
Referees: Tobias Kazda, Eva-Marie Bohn, Hendrik Herter

==== Final ====
8 February 2026
18:00 CET

Boxscore

Cedevita Olimpija (Slovenia)	82–73	(Serbia) Mega Super Belgrade
Scoring by quarter: 26–16, 19–19, 13–15, 24–23
Pts: Ciperle 29; Rebs: Ciperle, Houindo 9 Asts: Pregl 6		Pts: Gnjato 22; Rebs: Lilić 10; Asts: Karalić 3

Orange Campus, Ulm
Attendance: 0 (tentative)
Referees: Jens Rupprecht, Nils Kremer, Luisa Schumacher

==== Final ranking ====
Qualified to the Final tournament

Rank	Team
1	(Slovenia) Cedevita Olimpija
2	(Serbia) Mega Super Belgrade
3	(Germany) ratiopharm Ulm
4	(France) LDLC ASVEL
5	(Spain) Occident Bàsquet Manresa
6	(Italy) EA7 Emporio Armani Milano
7	(Europe) Next Gen Team Ulm
8	(Greece) Olympiacos Piraeus

=== Abu Dhabi, United Arab Emirates ===
UAE
- 27 February–1 March 2026

The second qualifying tournament featured hosts Next Gen Team Abu Dhabi and Dubai Basketball as well as Real Madrid, AS Monaco, Aris Thessaloniki, Žalgiris, Valencia Basket and London Lions. The tournament was cancelled due to the 2026 Iran war on February 28, with only 9 qualifier games played.

==== Group A ====
Pos	Team	Pld	W	L	PF	PA	PD	Qualification
1	(Spain) Real Madrid	2	2	0	205	105	+100	Final
2	(France) AS Monaco	2	1	1	121	201	−80	3rd place game
3	(United Arab Emirates) Dubai Basketball	2	1	1	162	138	+24	5th place game
4	(Greece) Aris Thessaloniki	2	0	2	122	166	−44	7th place game

Source: euroleaguebasketball.net

27 February 2026
8:00 AE

Boxscore

Aris Thessaloniki (Greece)	65–78	(Spain) Real Madrid
Scoring by quarter: 17–17, 12–24, 22–15, 14–22
Pts: Chatzilamprou 21; Rebs: Reinten 6 Asts: Messiniotis 7		Pts: Frolov 18; Rebs: Frolov 8 Asts: Robinson 5

SPACE42, Abu Dhabi
Attendance: 0 (tentative)
Referees: Neutral

27 February 2026
10:15 AE

Boxscore

Dubai Basketball (United Arab Emirates)	74–81	(France) AS Monaco
Scoring by quarter: 20–18, 16–19, 18–23, 20–21
Pts: Tobou 17; Rebs: Manel 6 Asts: Ilic 6		Pts: Ba 27; Rebs: Ba 13; Asts: Bathily 9

SPACE42, Abu Dhabi
Attendance: 0 (tentative)
Referees: Neutral

27 February 2026
17:00 AE

Boxscore

AS Monaco (France)	40–127	(Spain) Real Madrid
Scoring by quarter: 13–30, 16–38, 3–34, 8–25
Pts: N'Goli 12; Rebs: Lunion 10; Asts: Bathily 9		Pts: Bjelić 30; Rebs: Grīnvalds 12; Asts: Amosov 12

SPACE42, Abu Dhabi
Attendance: 0 (tentative)
Referees: Neutral

27 February 2026
19:15 AE

Boxscore

Aris Thessaloniki (Greece)	57–88	(United Arab Emirates) Dubai Basketball
Scoring by quarter: 14–18, 10–26, 17–18, 16–26
Pts: Chatzilamprou 12; Rebs: Reinten, Silbershteins 6 Asts: Messiniotis 7		Pts: Malović 16; Rebs: Manel 6 Asts: Ilic 7

SPACE42, Abu Dhabi
Attendance: 0 (tentative)
Referees: Neutral

28 February
12:30 AE

Boxscore

AS Monaco (France)	40–30	(Greece) Aris Thessaloniki
Scoring by quarter: 19–11, 21–23, 0–0, 0–0
Pts: Ba 14; Rebs: Ba, N'Goli 5 Asts: Bathily 5		Pts: Chatzilamprou 12; Rebs: Mikheev, Reinten 4 Asts: Messiniotis 10

SPACE42, Abu Dhabi
Attendance: 0 (tentative)
Referees: Neutral

28 February 2026
16:45 AE

Boxscore

Dubai Basketball (United Arab Emirates)	vs.	(Spain) Real Madrid

SPACE42, Abu Dhabi
Attendance: 0 (tentative)
Referees: Neutral

==== Group B ====
Pos	Team	Pld	W	L	PF	PA	PD	Qualification
1	(Europe) Next Gen Team Abu Dhabi	2	2	0	188	142	+46	Final
2	(Lithuania) Žalgiris	2	2	0	184	153	+31	3rd place game
3	(Spain) Valencia Basket	2	0	2	139	177	−38	5th place game
4	(United Kingdom) London Lions	2	0	2	156	195	−39	7th place game

Source: euroleaguebasketball.net

27 February 2026
12:30 AE

Boxscore

Žalgiris (Lithuania)	89–84	(Spain) Valencia Basket
Scoring by quarter: 19–24, 23–21, 30–17, 17–22
Pts: Adamson 16; Rebs: Štombergas 10; Asts: Brnović 5		Pts: Tazo 19; Rebs: Osayi 14; Asts: Tazo 5

SPACE42, Abu Dhabi
Attendance: 0 (tentative)
Referees: Neutral

27 February 2026
14:45 AE

Boxscore

London Lions (United Kingdom)	87–100	(Europe) Next Gen Team Abu Dhabi
Scoring by quarter: 17–20, 22–20, 22–25, 26–35
Pts: Gass 22; Rebs: Nwokolo 11; Asts: Prekevičius 7		Pts: Penda 28; Rebs: Penda 10; Asts: Orland 8

SPACE42, Abu Dhabi
Attendance: 0 (tentative)
Referees: Neutral

28 February 2026
8:00 AE

Boxscore

Valencia Basket (Spain)	55–88	(Europe) Next Gen Team Abu Dhabi
Scoring by quarter: 14–23, 20–25, 13–16, 8–24
Pts: Tazo 12; Rebs: three players 6 Asts: Laville-Guillon 6		Pts: Letailleur, Penda 18; Rebs: Penda 10; Asts: Houska 5

SPACE42, Abu Dhabi
Attendance: 0 (tentative)
Referees: Neutral

28 February 2026
10:15 AE

Boxscore

Žalgiris (Lithuania)	95–69	(United Kingdom) London Lions
Scoring by quarter: 19–26, 24–13, 22–19, 30–11
Pts: Adamson, Brnović 19; Rebs: Jakštonis 8 Asts: Černeckis 6		Pts: Nwokolo 17; Rebs: Nwokolo 10; Asts: Prekevičius 5

SPACE42, Abu Dhabi
Attendance: 0 (tentative)
Referees: Neutral

28 February 2026
17:00 AE

Boxscore

London Lions (United Kingdom)	vs.	(Spain) Valencia Basket

SPACE42, Abu Dhabi
Attendance: 0 (tentative)
Referees: Neutral

28 February 2026
19:15 AE

Boxscore

Next Gen Team Abu Dhabi (Europe)	vs.	(Lithuania) Žalgiris

SPACE42, Abu Dhabi
Attendance: 0 (tentative)
Referees: Neutral

=== Bologna, Italy ===
Italy
- 13–15 March 2026

The third qualifying tournament featured hosts Next Gen Team Bologna and Virtus Bologna, as well as FC Barcelona, Dolomiti Energia Trento, FC Bayern Munich, Paris Basketball, Fundación Baskonia-Alavés and Panathinaikos. Barcelona won the final game 88–53 against Baskonia to advance to the final tournament.

==== Group A ====
Pos	Team	Pld	W	L	PF	PA	PD	Qualification
1	(Spain) FC Barcelona	3	3	0	278	163	+115	Final
2	(Italy) Dolomiti Energia Trento	3	2	1	204	206	−2	3rd place game
3	(Germany) FC Bayern Munich	3	1	2	203	246	−43	5th place game
4	(France) Paris Basketball	3	0	3	181	251	−70	7th place game

Source: euroleaguebasketball.net

13 March 2026
9:30 CET

Boxscore

FC Bayern Munich (Germany)	56–84	(Italy) Dolomiti Energia Trento
Scoring by quarter: 9–19, 15–25, 17–18, 15–22
Pts: Dueck 18; Rebs: Dueck 11; Asts: Danziger 5		Pts: Bayo 17; Rebs: Bayo 11; Asts: Niang 4

PalaDozza, Bologna
Attendance: 0 (tentative)
Referees: Neutral

13 March 2026
11:15 CET

Boxscore

FC Barcelona (Spain)	99–48	(France) Paris Basketball
Scoring by quarter: 28–16, 22–7, 25–7, 24–18
Pts: Boumtje-Boumtje 22; Rebs: Boumtje-Boumtje 9 Asts: Poza 5		Pts: Mabaka 13; Rebs: Azema 10; Asts: Azema 4

PalaDozza, Bologna
Attendance: 0 (tentative)
Referees: Neutral

13 March 2026
18:00 CET

Boxscore

Paris Basketball (France)	58–70	(Italy) Dolomiti Energia Trento
Scoring by quarter: 15–12, 17–22, 11–19, 15–17
Pts: Vounang Nanfah 20; Rebs: Azema 8 Asts: Cokara 7		Pts: Bayo 17; Rebs: Bayo 12; Asts: Niang 5

PalaDozza, Bologna
Attendance: 0 (tentative)
Referees: Neutral

13 March 2026
20:15 CET

Boxscore

FC Bayern Munich (Germany)	65–87	(Spain) FC Barcelona
Scoring by quarter: 13–13, 14–26, 18–23, 20–25
Pts: Susic 14; Rebs: Dueck 7 Asts: Vossenberg 4		Pts: Boumtje-Boumtje 22; Rebs: Dabone 10; Asts: three players 4

PalaDozza, Bologna
Attendance: 0 (tentative)
Referees: Neutral

14 March 2026
13:30 CET

Boxscore

Paris Basketball (France)	75–82	(Germany) FC Bayern Munich
Scoring by quarter: 23–24, 14–20, 22–18, 16–20
Pts: Barry 23; Rebs: Vounang Nanfah 6 Asts: Cokara 5		Pts: Susic 22; Rebs: Dueck 14; Asts: three players 3

PalaDozza, Bologna
Attendance: 0 (tentative)
Referees: Neutral

14 March 2026
15:45 CET

Boxscore

FC Barcelona (Spain)	92–50	(Italy) Dolomiti Energia Trento
Scoring by quarter: 25–13, 24–11, 27–16, 16–10
Pts: Kusturica 21; Rebs: Koné, Kusturica 8 Asts: Poza 9		Pts: Vergnaghi 20; Rebs: Bayo 6 Asts: three players 3

PalaDozza, Bologna
Attendance: 0 (tentative)
Referees: Neutral

==== Group B ====
Pos	Team	Pld	W	L	PF	PA	PD	Qualification
1	(Spain) Fundación Baskonia-Alavés	3	3	0	254	211	+43	Final
2	(Europe) Next Gen Team Bologna	3	2	1	264	249	+15	3rd place game
3	(Italy) Virtus Bologna	3	1	2	239	233	+6	5th place game
4	(Greece) Panathinaikos	3	0	3	195	259	−64	7th place game

Source: euroleaguebasketball.net

13 March 2026
13:30 CET

Boxscore

Fundación Baskonia-Alavés (Spain)	96–64	(Greece) Panathinaikos
Scoring by quarter: 21–15, 29–13, 25–13, 21–23
Pts: Bol 26; Rebs: Diallo 17; Asts: Khatiashvili 7		Pts: Kızıl 13; Rebs: Pagoulatos 5 Asts: Chatzis 6

PalaDozza, Bologna
Attendance: 0 (tentative)
Referees: Neutral

13 March 2026
15:45 CET

Boxscore

Virtus Bologna (Italy)	95–98 (OT)	(Europe) Next Gen Team Bologna
Scoring by quarter: 26–25, 19–14, 15–24, 22–19, Overtime: 13–16
Pts: Berlingeri 35; Rebs: Acunzo 15; Asts: Milazzo 6		Pts: Aizpurs 22; Rebs: Gradin 14; Asts: Aizpurs 3

PalaDozza, Bologna
Attendance: 0 (tentative)
Referees: Neutral

14 March 2026
9:00 CET

Boxscore

Next Gen Team Bologna (Europe)	84–65	(Greece) Panathinaikos
Scoring by quarter: 22–11, 16–22, 23–19, 23–13
Pts: Niebla 17; Rebs: Cizej 13; Asts: Aizpurs 6		Pts: Kızıl 15; Rebs: Giano, Valkov 4 Asts: Kızıl, Vasileiadis 2

PalaDozza, Bologna
Attendance: 0 (tentative)
Referees: Neutral

14 March 2026
11:15 CET

Boxscore

Fundación Baskonia-Alavés (Spain)	69–65	(Italy) Virtus Bologna
Scoring by quarter: 20–15, 15–9, 18–19, 16–22
Pts: Khatiashvili 19; Rebs: Bol 9 Asts: Joksimović, Khatiashvili 3		Pts: Berlingeri 18; Rebs: Acunzo 11; Asts: four players 2

PalaDozza, Bologna
Attendance: 0 (tentative)
Referees: Neutral

14 March 2026
18:00 CET

Boxscore

Next Gen Team Bologna (Europe)	82–89	(Spain) Fundación Baskonia-Alavés
Scoring by quarter: 24–14, 24–20, 13–30, 21–25
Pts: Aizpurs 23; Rebs: Cizej 7 Asts: Garac 4		Pts: Joksimović 38; Rebs: Bol 15; Asts: Khatiashvili 5

PalaDozza, Bologna
Attendance: 0 (tentative)
Referees: Neutral

14 March 2026
20:15 CET

Boxscore

Virtus Bologna (Italy)	79–66	(Greece) Panathinaikos
Scoring by quarter: 20–22, 13–16, 28–18, 18–10
Pts: Ventura 21; Rebs: Acunzo 9 Asts: Milazzo 7		Pts: Karras 21; Rebs: Valkov 6 Asts: Vasileiadis 3

PalaDozza, Bologna
Attendance: 0 (tentative)
Referees: Neutral

==== 7th place game ====
15 March 2026
9:00 CET

Boxscore

Paris Basketball (France)	91–64	(Greece) Panathinaikos
Scoring by quarter: 22–16, 20–7, 25–21, 24–20
Pts: Vounang Nanfah 18; Rebs: Vounang Nanfah 9 Asts: Cokara 4		Pts: Pagoulatos 17; Rebs: Papanikolaou 8 Asts: Vasileiadis 4

PalaDozza, Bologna
Attendance: 0 (tentative)
Referees: Neutral

==== 5th place game ====
15 March 2026
11:15 CET

Boxscore

FC Bayern Munich (Germany)	62–70	(Italy) Virtus Bologna
Scoring by quarter: 18–16, 13–20, 17–13, 14–21
Pts: Susic 14; Rebs: Dueck, Susic 7 Asts: Vossenberg 4		Pts: Ventura 20; Rebs: Acunzo 10; Asts: Ventura 3

PalaDozza, Bologna
Attendance: 0 (tentative)
Referees: Neutral

==== 3rd place game ====
15 March 2026
13:30 CET

Boxscore

Dolomiti Energia Trento (Italy)	66–52	(Europe) Next Gen Team Bologna
Scoring by quarter: 24–12, 14–13, 17–10, 11–17
Pts: Parravicini 16; Rebs: Bayo 13; Asts: Barra, Parravicini 3		Pts: Aizpurs 15; Rebs: Boruciński-Hrycyk, Milanese 5 Asts: Kangur 3

PalaDozza, Bologna
Attendance: 0 (tentative)
Referees: Neutral

==== Final ====
15 March 2026
16:00 CET

Boxscore

FC Barcelona (Spain)	88–53	(Spain) Fundación Baskonia-Alavés
Scoring by quarter: 18–16, 25–9, 24–21, 21–7
Pts: Kusturica 22; Rebs: Boumtje-Boumtje 11; Asts: Dabone 7		Pts: Khatiashvili 15; Rebs: Bol 7 Asts: Khatiashvili 3

PalaDozza, Bologna
Attendance: 0 (tentative)
Referees: Neutral

==== Final ranking ====
Qualified to the Final tournament

Rank	Team
1	(Spain) FC Barcelona
2	(Spain) Fundación Baskonia-Alavés
3	(Italy) Dolomiti Energia Trento
4	(Europe) Next Gen Team Bologna
5	(Italy) Virtus Bologna
6	(Germany) FC Bayern Munich
7	(France) Paris Basketball
8	(Greece) Panathinaikos

=== Belgrade, Serbia ===
Serbia
- 20–22 March 2026

The third qualifying tournament featured hosts Crvena zvezda, Partizan Mozzart Bet, FMP Belgrade and Next Gen Team Belgrade, as well as Anadolu Efes, Maccabi Tel Aviv, Hapoel Tel Aviv and Pôle France INSEP. Pôle France INSEP won 73–95 against Crvena zvezda to advance to the final tournament.

==== Group A ====
Pos	Team	Pld	W	L	PF	PA	PD	Qualification
1	(Serbia) Crvena zvezda	3	3	0	251	201	+50	Final
2	(Europe) Next Gen Team Belgrade	3	2	1	247	204	+43	3rd place game
3	(Turkey) Anadolu Efes	3	1	2	199	223	−24	5th place game
4	(Israel) Maccabi Tel Aviv	3	0	3	205	274	−69	7th place game

Source: euroleaguebasketball.net

20 March 2026
9:00 CET

Boxscore

Crvena zvezda (Serbia)	105–74	(Israel) Maccabi Tel Aviv
Scoring by quarter: 29–26, 28–6, 25–24, 23–18
Pts: Nedeljković 25; Rebs: Nedeljković 14; Asts: Simjanovski 5		Pts: Stoller 16; Rebs: Stoller 5 Asts: Lachmanovich 7

Aleksandar Nikolić Hall, Belgrade
Attendance: 150
Referees: Neutral

20 March 2026
11:00 CET

Boxscore

Next Gen Team Belgrade (Europe)	82–68	(Turkey) Anadolu Efes
Scoring by quarter: 27–23, 18–20, 20–13, 17–12
Pts: Riethauser 24; Rebs: Ahamefule 13; Asts: Sanz 9		Pts: Koyun 15; Rebs: Koyun 10; Asts: three players 4

Aleksandar Nikolić Hall, Belgrade
Attendance: 100
Referees: Neutral

20 March 2026
17:00 CET

Boxscore

Maccabi Tel Aviv (Israel)	67–72	(Turkey) Anadolu Efes
Scoring by quarter: 16–20, 10–15, 20–16, 21–21
Pts: Alkobi 21; Rebs: Sela 6 Asts: Stoller 5		Pts: Koyun 19; Rebs: Koyun 10; Asts: Pınar️️️️️️ 5

Aleksandar Nikolić Hall, Belgrade
Attendance: 100
Referees: Neutral

20 March 2026
19:00 CET

Boxscore

Crvena zvezda (Serbia)	72–68	(Europe) Next Gen Team Belgrade
Scoring by quarter: 25–20, 17–9, 16–19, 14–21
Pts: Nedeljković 26; Rebs: Nedeljković 12; Asts: Nedeljković 6		Pts: Solano 14; Rebs: Riethauser 7 Asts: Sanz 6

Aleksandar Nikolić Hall, Belgrade
Attendance: 350
Referees: Neutral

21 March 2026
13:00 CET

Boxscore

Next Gen Team Belgrade (Europe)	97–64	(Israel) Maccabi Tel Aviv
Scoring by quarter: 21–15, 26–12, 32–16, 18–21
Pts: Perić, Riethauser 14; Rebs: Łysek, Solano 8 Asts: Riethauser, Solano 4		Pts: Ashkenazi 17; Rebs: Sela, Shalmon 6 Asts: Stoller 6

Aleksandar Nikolić Hall, Belgrade
Attendance: 100
Referees: Neutral

21 March 2026
15:00 CET

Boxscore

Anadolu Efes (Turkey)	59–74	(Serbia) Crvena zvezda
Scoring by quarter: 14–18, 20–24, 16–12, 9–20
Pts: Koyun 20; Rebs: Koyun 7 Asts: Fenemen 3		Pts: Bikić 26; Rebs: Ryabov 8 Asts: Bikić 7

Aleksandar Nikolić Hall, Belgrade
Attendance: 300
Referees: Neutral

==== Group B ====
Pos	Team	Pld	W	L	PF	PA	PD	Qualification
1	Pôle France INSEP	3	3	0	284	225	+59	Final
2	(Serbia) Partizan Mozzart Bet	3	2	1	252	241	+11	3rd place game
3	(Serbia) FMP Belgrade	3	1	2	249	274	−25	5th place game
4	(Israel) Hapoel Tel Aviv	3	0	3	231	276	−45	7th place game

Source: euroleaguebasketball.net

20 March 2026
13:00 CET

Boxscore

FMP Belgrade (Serbia)	71–78	(Serbia) Partizan Mozzart Bet
Scoring by quarter: 16–17, 21–21, 12–22, 22–18
Pts: Aduramo, Šaranović 13; Rebs: Aduramo 11; Asts: three players 4		Pts: Miladinović 20; Rebs: Mijailović 12; Asts: three players 4

Aleksandar Nikolić Hall, Belgrade
Attendance: 350
Referees: Neutral

20 March 2026
15:00 CET

Boxscore

Pôle France INSEP	91–58	(Israel) Hapoel Tel Aviv
Scoring by quarter: 28–13, 21–16, 24–15, 18–14
Pts: Yangala 16; Rebs: Elouma 9 Asts: Elouma 7		Pts: Brakat 10; Rebs: Brakat, Hadad 4 Asts: Dotan 5

Aleksandar Nikolić Hall, Belgrade
Attendance: 100
Referees: Neutral

21 March 2026
9:00 CET

Boxscore

Partizan Mozzart Bet (Serbia)	93–83	(Israel) Hapoel Tel Aviv
Scoring by quarter: 29–29, 22–21, 16–17, 26–16
Pts: Bojović 38; Rebs: Jovanović 8 Asts: Bojović 5		Pts: Dotan 18; Rebs: Dotan 9 Asts: Dotan 9

Aleksandar Nikolić Hall, Belgrade
Attendance: 150
Referees: Neutral

21 March 2026
11:00 CET

Boxscore

FMP Belgrade (Serbia)	86–106	Pôle France INSEP
Scoring by quarter: 24–34, 21–26, 17–26, 24–20
Pts: Maksić 12; Rebs: Pupovac 6 Asts: Ivković 6		Pts: des Bordes 23; Rebs: Soliman 7 Asts: Pierrot, Soliman 7

Aleksandar Nikolić Hall, Belgrade
Attendance: 150
Referees: Neutral

21 March 2026
17:00 CET

Boxscore

Hapoel Tel Aviv (Israel)	90–92 (OT)	(Serbia) FMP Belgrade
Scoring by quarter: 16–24, 23–21, 25–17, 17–19, Overtime: 9–11
Pts: Dotan 23; Rebs: Kab 9 Asts: Dotan 5		Pts: Pupovac 21; Rebs: Pavlović 8 Asts: Babkin 9

Aleksandar Nikolić Hall, Belgrade
Attendance: 200
Referees: Neutral

21 March 2026
19:00 CET

Boxscore

Pôle France INSEP	87–81	(Serbia) Partizan Mozzart Bet
Scoring by quarter: 26–32, 16–18, 21–15, 24–16
Pts: Yangala 20; Rebs: Yangala 9 Asts: Masdieu-Reynaert 7		Pts: Bojović 20; Rebs: Jovanović 9 Asts: Bojović 8

Aleksandar Nikolić Hall, Belgrade
Attendance: 400
Referees: Neutral

==== 7th place game ====
22 March 2026
9:00 CET

Boxscore

Maccabi Tel Aviv (Israel)	70–64	(Israel) Hapoel Tel Aviv
Scoring by quarter: 22–15, 15–22, 17–14, 16–13
Pts: Lachmanovich 17; Rebs: Shalmon 8 Asts: Lachmanovich 7		Pts: Mossinson 16; Rebs: Brakat 7 Asts: Mossinson 7

Aleksandar Nikolić Hall, Belgrade
Attendance: 50
Referees: Neutral

==== 5th place game ====
22 March 2026
11:00 CET

Boxscore

Anadolu Efes (Turkey)	94–87	(Serbia) FMP Belgrade
Scoring by quarter: 22–24, 28–12, 26–22, 18–29
Pts: Karutasu 19; Rebs: Koyun 11; Asts: Pınar️️️️️️ 4		Pts: Bojović, Šaranović 15; Rebs: Aduramo 8 Asts: Maksić 6

Aleksandar Nikolić Hall, Belgrade
Attendance: 100
Referees: Neutral

==== 3rd place game ====
22 March 2026
13:00 CET

Boxscore

Next Gen Team Belgrade (Europe)	93–45	(Serbia) Partizan Mozzart Bet
Scoring by quarter: 19–17, 21–8, 26–12, 27–8
Pts: Solano 21; Rebs: Riethauser 8 Asts: Sanz 8		Pts: Bojović 15; Rebs: Dramićanin 8 Asts: Bojović, Manojlović 3

Aleksandar Nikolić Hall, Belgrade
Attendance: 200
Referees: Neutral

==== Final ====
22 March 2026
15:00 CET

Boxscore

Crvena zvezda (Serbia)	73–95	Pôle France INSEP
Scoring by quarter: 23–29, 13–27, 17–24, 20–15
Pts: three players 14; Rebs: Ryabov 12; Asts: Nedeljković 6		Pts: Soliman 19; Rebs: Soliman 12; Asts: Masdieu-Reynaert, Soliman 5

Aleksandar Nikolić Hall, Belgrade
Attendance: 1,000
Referees: Neutral

==== Final ranking ====
Qualified to the Final tournament

Rank	Team
1	Pôle France INSEP
2	(Serbia) Crvena zvezda
3	(Europe) Next Gen Team Belgrade
4	(Serbia) Partizan Mozzart Bet
5	(Turkey) Anadolu Efes
6	(Serbia) FMP Belgrade
7	(Israel) Maccabi Tel Aviv
8	(Israel) Hapoel Tel Aviv

== Final tournament ==
The Final tournament was played between 21 and 24 May 2026 in Athens, Greece. The group-stage games were held at the SUNEL Arena while the final was played at the Telekom Center Athens before the 2026 EuroLeague Championship Game.

=== Teams ===
Host team	Qualified teams	Invited teams
(Greece) Panathinaikos	(Slovenia) Cedevita Olimpija (Spain) FC Barcelona; Pôle France INSEP	(Europe) Next Gen Team 3SSB (Serbia) Crvena zvezda (Spain) Real Madrid (Lithuania) Žalgiris

Greece

=== Group A ===
Pos	Team	Pld	W	L	GF	GA	GD	Qualification
1	(Spain) Real Madrid	3	3	0	332	169	+163	Qualification to the final
2	Pôle France INSEP	3	2	1	231	228	+3	
3	(Greece) Panathinaikos	3	1	2	214	312	−98	
4	(Slovenia) Cedevita Olimpija	3	0	3	196	264	−68	

Source: Adidas NGT
Rules for classification: 1) points; 2) Head-to-head; 3) Points difference; 4) Points scored.

21 May 2026
9:10 CEST

Boxscore

Cedevita Olimpija (Slovenia)	58–109	(Spain) Real Madrid
Scoring by quarter: 16–26, 18–30, 12–29, 12–24
Pts: Ciperle 24; Rebs: Ciperle 9 Asts: Pregl 4		Pts: Kayser 21; Rebs: Bjelić, Grīnvalds 7 Asts: Kayser 7

SUNEL Arena, Athens
Attendance: 0 (tentative)
Referees: Neutral

21 May 2026
13:30 CEST

Boxscore

Pôle France INSEP	102–77	(Greece) Panathinaikos
Scoring by quarter: 19–17, 31–13, 25–21, 27–26
Pts: Masdieu-Reynaert 19; Rebs: Masdieu-Reynaert 7 Asts: Masdieu-Reynaert 9		Pts: Quiñones 29; Rebs: Kızıl, Quiñones 8 Asts: Quiñones 9

SUNEL Arena, Athens
Attendance: 0 (tentative)
Referees: Neutral

22 May 2026
09:00 CEST

Boxscore

Real Madrid (Spain)	97–63	Pôle France INSEP
Scoring by quarter: 23–20, 28–15, 23–14, 23–14
Pts: Grīnvalds 22; Rebs: Bjelić, Kayser 8 Asts: Alonso, Bjelić 9		Pts: Masdieu-Reynaert 14; Rebs: Iwani 9 Asts: Pierrot 3

SUNEL Arena, Athens
Attendance: 0 (tentative)
Referees: Neutral

22 May 2026
13:30 CEST

Boxscore

Panathinaikos (Greece)	89–84	(Slovenia) Cedevita Olimpija
Scoring by quarter: 21–30, 23–17, 21–16, 24–21
Pts: Quiñones 34; Rebs: Papanikolaou 9 Asts: Quiñones 6		Pts: Ciperle, Houindo 21; Rebs: Ciperle 16; Asts: Pregl 9

SUNEL Arena, Athens
Attendance: 0 (tentative)
Referees: Neutral

23 May 2026
9:00 CEST

Boxscore

Pôle France INSEP	66–54	(Slovenia) Cedevita Olimpija
Scoring by quarter: 21–10, 10–14, 18–22, 17–8
Pts: Yangala 26; Rebs: Yangala 11; Asts: Masdieu-Reynaert 7		Pts: Houindo 24; Rebs: Houindo 13; Asts: Jagodnik 6

SUNEL Arena, Athens
Attendance: 0 (tentative)
Referees: Neutral

23 May 2026
13:30 CEST

Boxscore

Real Madrid (Spain)	126–48	(Greece) Panathinaikos
Scoring by quarter: 25–10, 28–14, 39–10, 34–14
Pts: Fantić 20; Rebs: Diarra 9 Asts: Kutluay 9		Pts: Quiñones 18; Rebs: Quiñones 12; Asts: Quiñones 5

SUNEL Arena, Athens
Attendance: 0 (tentative)
Referees: Neutral

=== Group B ===
Pos	Team	Pld	W	L	GF	GA	GD	Qualification
1	(Spain) FC Barcelona	3	3	0	308	247	+61	Qualification to the final
2	(Europe) Next Gen Team 3SSB	3	2	1	285	278	+7	
3	(Lithuania) Žalgiris	3	1	2	288	309	−21	
4	(Serbia) Crvena zvezda	3	0	3	262	309	−47	

Source: Adidas NGT
Rules for classification: 1) points; 2) Head-to-head; 3) Points difference; 4) Points scored.

21 May 2026
11:15 CEST

Boxscore

FC Barcelona (Spain)	97–83	(Serbia) Crvena zvezda
Scoring by quarter: 24–18, 16–24, 37–19, 20–22
Pts: Dabone 23; Rebs: Keita 10; Asts: Poza 8		Pts: Janjušević 18; Rebs: Bikić 8 Asts: Pavlović 5

SUNEL Arena, Athens
Attendance: 0 (tentative)
Referees: Neutral

21 May 2026
15:45 CEST

Boxscore

Žalgiris (Lithuania)	93–104	(Europe) Next Gen Team 3SSB
Scoring by quarter: 22–28, 20–27, 31–22, 20–27
Pts: Kukta 22; Rebs: Jakštonis 9 Asts: Kukta 5		Pts: Davis 26; Rebs: Anderson, Davis 7 Asts: Anderson 7

SUNEL Arena, Athens
Attendance: 0 (tentative)
Referees: Neutral

22 May 2026
11:15 CEST

Boxscore

Next Gen Team 3SSB (Europe)	97–84	(Serbia) Crvena zvezda
Scoring by quarter: 20–27, 25–23, 22–21, 30–13
Pts: Davis 20; Rebs: Anderson 9 Asts: Anderson 13		Pts: Nedeljković 30; Rebs: Ryabov 7 Asts: Pavlović 6

SUNEL Arena, Athens
Attendance: 0 (tentative)
Referees: Neutral

22 May 2026
15:45 CEST

Boxscore

FC Barcelona (Spain)	110–80	(Lithuania) Žalgiris
Scoring by quarter: 29–17, 27–18, 30–24, 24–21
Pts: Boumtje-Boumtje 24; Rebs: Keita 12; Asts: Poza 7		Pts: Štombergas 18; Rebs: Mištautas 7 Asts: Černeckis, Sabeckas 4

SUNEL Arena, Athens
Attendance: 0 (tentative)
Referees: Neutral

23 May 2026
11:15 CEST

Boxscore

Crvena zvezda (Serbia)	95–115	(Lithuania) Žalgiris
Scoring by quarter: 17–24, 22–30, 22–33, 34–28
Pts: Nedeljković 25; Rebs: Živojinović 11; Asts: Pavlović 6		Pts: Jakštonis, Mištautas 20; Rebs: Jakštonis 10; Asts: Brnović 8

SUNEL Arena, Athens
Attendance: 0 (tentative)
Referees: Neutral

23 May 2026
15:45 CEST

Boxscore

Next Gen Team 3SSB (Europe)	84–101	(Spain) FC Barcelona
Scoring by quarter: 33–23, 16–26, 11–34, 24–18
Pts: Davis 25; Rebs: Callendar 6 Asts: Anderson 9		Pts: Dabone 25; Rebs: Boumtje-Boumtje 11; Asts: Poza 9

SUNEL Arena, Athens
Attendance: 0 (tentative)
Referees: Neutral

=== Final ===
24 May 2026	Real Madrid (Spanish Basketball Federation)	77–85	(Spanish Basketball Federation) FC Barcelona	Marousi, Greece
17:00 (CEST)	Scoring by quarter: 22–24, 16–15, 24–21, 15–25
	Pts: Amosov 16; Rebs: Amosov 9 Asts: Alonso, Kayser 4 PIR: Grīnvalds 13	Boxscore	Pts: Kusturica 20; Rebs: Kusturica 10; Asts: Ferreras, Poza 6 PIR: Kusturica 22	Arena: Telekom Center Athens; Referees: Vassilis Pitsilkas, Huseyin Celik, Dragan Porobic

Starters:			Pts	Reb	Ast
G	7	(Spain) Hugo Alonso	7	3	4
G	8	(Germany) Fabian Kayser	14	5	4
F	6	(Latvia) Gunārs Grīnvalds	13	3	1
F	17	(Russia) Egor Amosov	16	9	2
C	18	(Mali) Ousmane Diarra	4	6	2
Reserves:					
G	10	(Turkey) Ömer Kutluay	2	0	2
G	11	(Serbia) Andrej Bjelić	6	0	3
F	13	(Montenegro) Andrej Fantić	0	1	0
F	14	(Russia) Ilia Frolov	11	2	1
C	15	(Senegal) Serigne Sarr	0	0	0
G	20	(Spain) Osa Hadi	4	1	0
Head coach:
(Spanish Basketball Federation) Javier Juárez

Real Madrid	FC Barcelona

Real Madrid	Statistics	FC Barcelona
17/33 (51.5%)	2-pt field goals	16/32 (50.0%)
10/38 (26.3%)	3-pt field goals	10/31 (32.3%)
13/15 (86.7%)	Free throws	23/31 (74.2%)
12	Offensive rebounds	16
23	Defensive rebounds	32
35	Total rebounds	48
19	Assists	21
13	Turnovers	16
9	Steals	9
1	Blocks	4
23	Fouls	17

Starters:			Pts	Reb	Ast
PG	11	(Spain) Nil Poza	8	3	6
SG	23	(Spain) Diego Ferreras	8	6	6
SF	46	(Serbia) Nikola Kusturica	20	10	2
PF	44	(United States) Joaquim Boumtje-Boumtje	17	6	2
C	60	(Burkina Faso) Mohamed Dabone	10	3	0
Reserves:					
C	1	(Mali) Abdrahamane Koné	DNP		
F	2	(Spain) Eric Montaner	0	0	0
G	3	(Slovenia) Jakob Siftar	10	3	2
F	7	(Mali) Mohamed Keita	7	4	0
F	17	(Spain) Jan Cerdán	DNP		
C	21	(Mali) Sayon Keita	5	7	0
G	30	(Spain) Oriol Filbà	0	1	3
Head coach:
(Spanish Basketball Federation) Álvaro Salinas

=== Awards ===
MVP

(United States) Joaquim Boumtje-Boumtje (Barcelona)

Rising star

(United States) Blaze Johnson (Next Gen Team 3SSB)

All-Tournament Team

- Yaël Masdieu-Reynaert (Pôle France INSEP Paris)
- (Germany) Fabian Kayser (Real Madrid)
- (United States) Jalen Davis (Next Gen Team 3SSB)
- (Burkina Faso) Mohamed Dabone (Barcelona)
- (United States) Joaquim Boumtje-Boumtje (Barcelona)
