= Joaquim Boumtje-Boumtje =

American basketball player (born 2009)

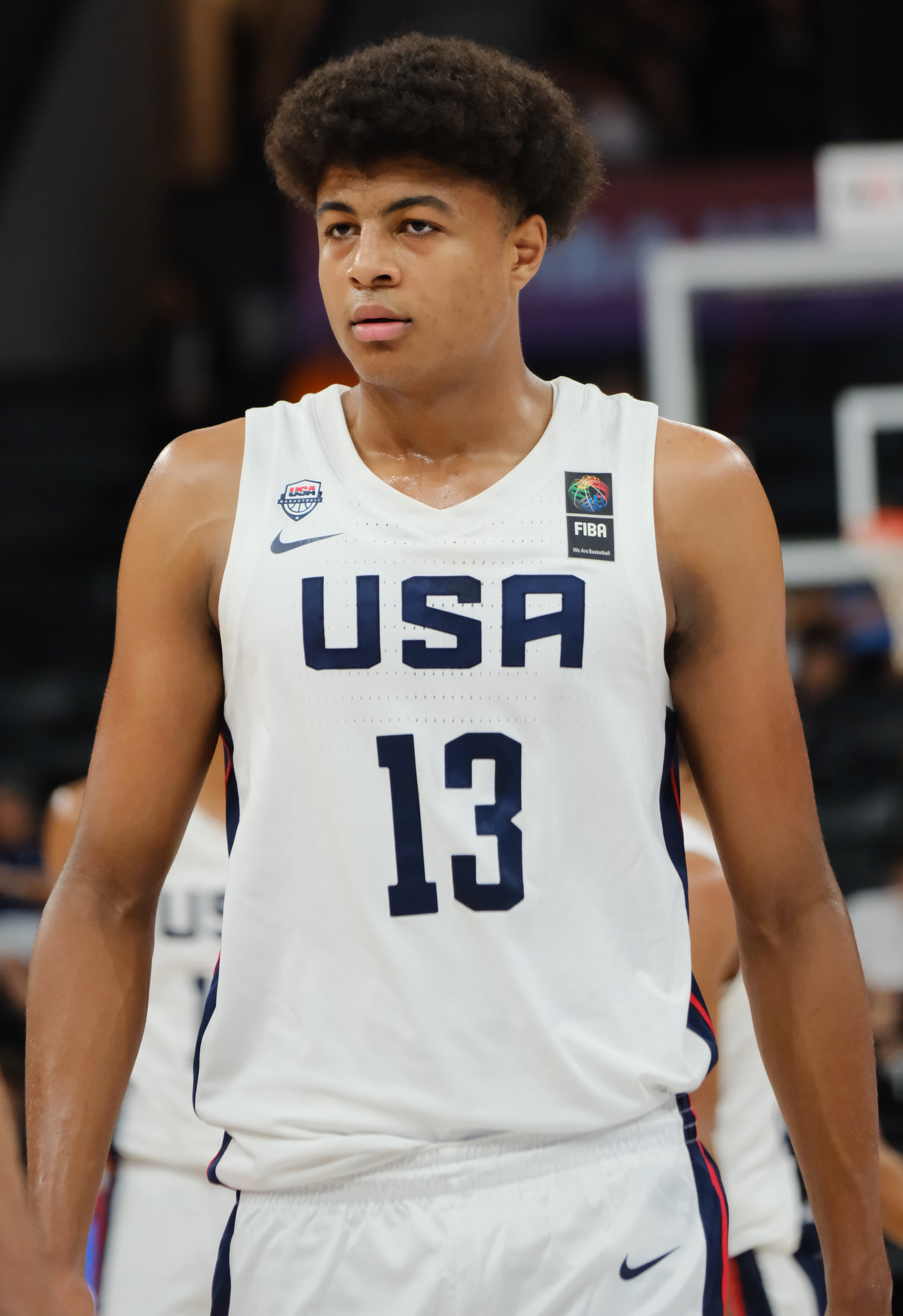
- Boumtje-Boumtje representing the USA in 2026

No. 30 – Duke Blue Devils
- Position: Center / power forward
- Conference: Atlantic Coast Conference

Personal information
- Born: May 30, 2009 (age 17)
- Listed height: 7 ft 2 in (2.18 m)
- Listed weight: 250 lb (113 kg)

Career information
- College: Duke (2026–present)

Career history
- 2025–2026: FC Barcelona
- 2025–2026: →FC Barcelona B

Career highlights
- FIBA Under-17 World Cup MVP (2026); EuroLeague NextGen champion (2026); EuroLeague NextGen MVP (2026)
Medals
Representing the United States
Men's basketball
FIBA Under-17 World Cup
Gold medal – first place	2026 Turkey	Team

Joaquim Bertrand Boumtje-Boumtje (born May 30, 2009) is an American college basketball player for the Duke Blue Devils. He previously played for FC Barcelona B of the Liga U in Spain. Boumtje-Boumtje stands 7 ft 2 in (2.18 m) and plays the center and power forward positions.

== Early life ==
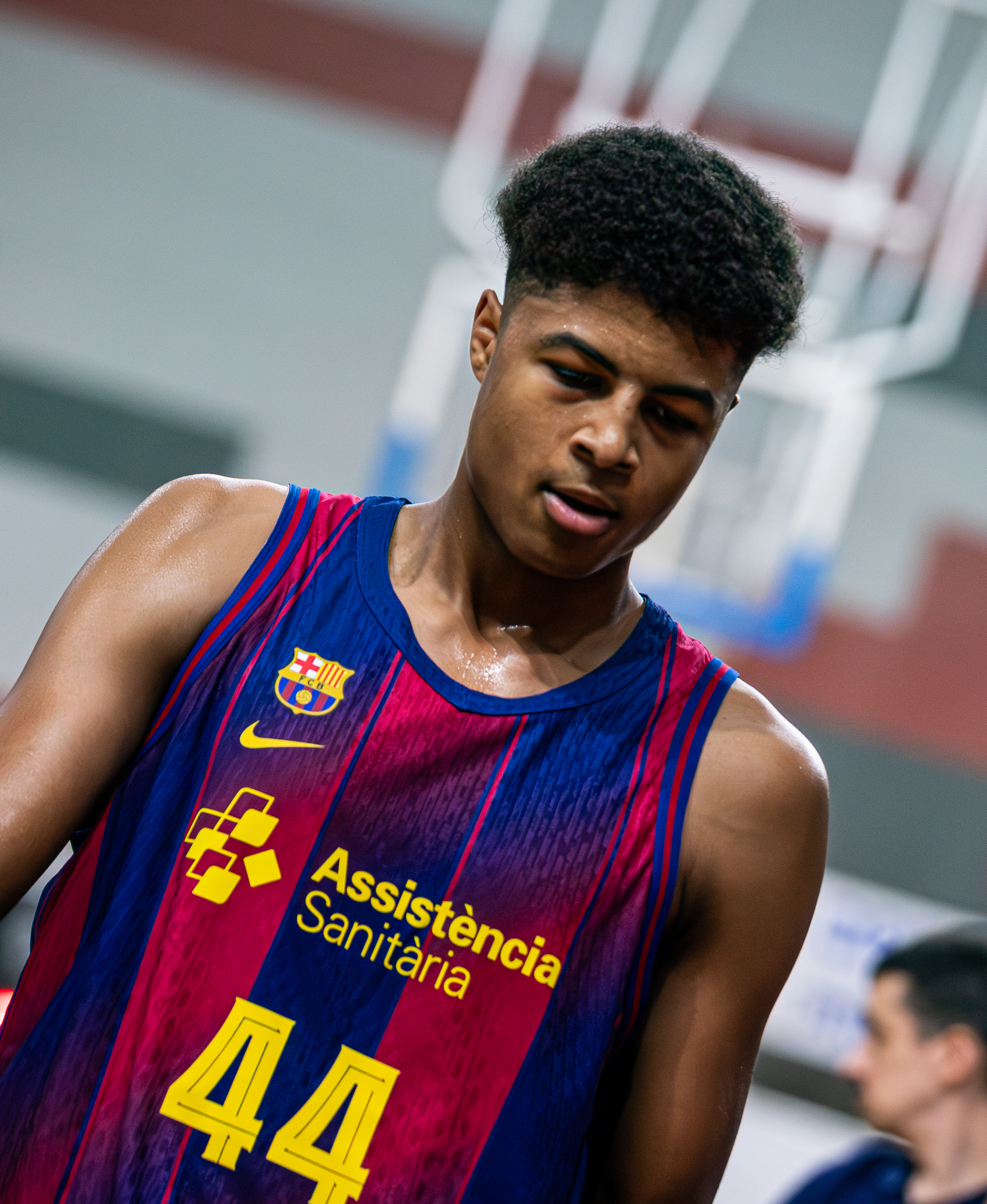
Boumtje-Boumtje with FC Barcelona B in 2025

Boumtje-Boumtje was born on May 30, 2009. (Note: Sources give conflicting places of birth, with SB Nation listing Oldenburg, Germany, and FIBA listing St. Petersburg, Florida.) He grew up in the United States, spending time in Chicago, Florida, and Delaware. Boumtje-Boumtje moved to Spain at age 14, when his father was hired as the head of league operations for the Basketball Africa League, and joined the FC Barcelona youth academy ahead of the 2023–24 season. He helped the Barcelona cadete (under-16) team to a runner-up finish at the 2025 Spanish National Championship, recording 18 points and 11 rebounds in an 82–73 loss to Real Madrid Baloncesto. Boumtje-Boumtje was also named MVP at the 2025 Torneig Sant Vicenç de Montalt earlier that year, where he averaged 14 points per game and tallied 18 points and 10 rebounds in a 93–81 win over Real Madrid in the final. In 2026, he helped the Barcelona junior (under-18) team to a national runner-up finish, posting 19 points and seven rebounds in a 91–87 loss to Real Madrid in the final.

Boumtje-Boumtje also helped the Barcelona U18 team win the 2025–26 EuroLeague NextGen Bologna Qualifier, earning tournament MVP honors after averaging 18.8 points and 8.5 rebounds per game. He went on to win the Final tournament of the 2025–26 EuroLeague NextGen Final tournament in Athens with Barcelona, in which he was selected the Final's MVP and also made the All-Tournament Team.

Boumtje-Boumtje was rated as a consensus five-star recruit and one of the top players in the 2026 class, having reclassified from the 2027 class. On April 30, 2026, he verbally committed to playing college basketball at Duke, joining the Blue Devils' top-ranked recruiting class. He was also pursued by North Carolina.

Boumtje-Boumtje has been called a "unicorn".

== Professional career ==
Boumtje-Boumtje was one of six youth players promoted to the Barcelona senior team for the 2025–26 preseason by head coach Joan Peñarroya, filling in for players on national team duty. He appeared in their first preseason game, a 91–90 friendly win against Paris Basketball in Andorra. Boumtje-Boumtje was then assigned to club's reserve team for the inaugural season of the newly-created Spanish under-22 league, Liga U. On November 28, 2025, he scored 29 points on eight-of-11 three-point shooting to go with six rebounds in a 93–69 win over rival Real Madrid Baloncesto B. He averaged 15.8 points and 6.7 rebounds per game on the season.

== National team career ==
In October 2025, Boumtje-Boumtje was invited to attend USA Basketball Men's Junior National Team minicamp held in Colorado Springs, Colorado. The following year, he was selected to represent the United States at the 2026 FIBA Under-17 World Cup in Turkey. Boumtje-Boumtje set a new team record with seven blocks in a 128–66 group stage win over Japan. He recorded 31 points and 16 rebounds in a 149–82 win over Puerto Rico in the quarterfinals, helping the USA break the tournament record for points in a single game. Boumtje-Boumtje posted 20 points and 15 rebounds in a 107–81 win over Serbia in the final, helping the United States win its eighth straight gold medal at the event. He averaged 19.6 points and a tournament-leading 10.9 rebounds per game and was subsequently named the Under-17 World Cup MVP.

== Personal life ==
Boumtje-Boumtje is the son of former Portland Trail Blazers and Georgetown University player Ruben Boumtje-Boumtje.
