= Nikola Kusturica =

Serbian basketball player (born 2009)

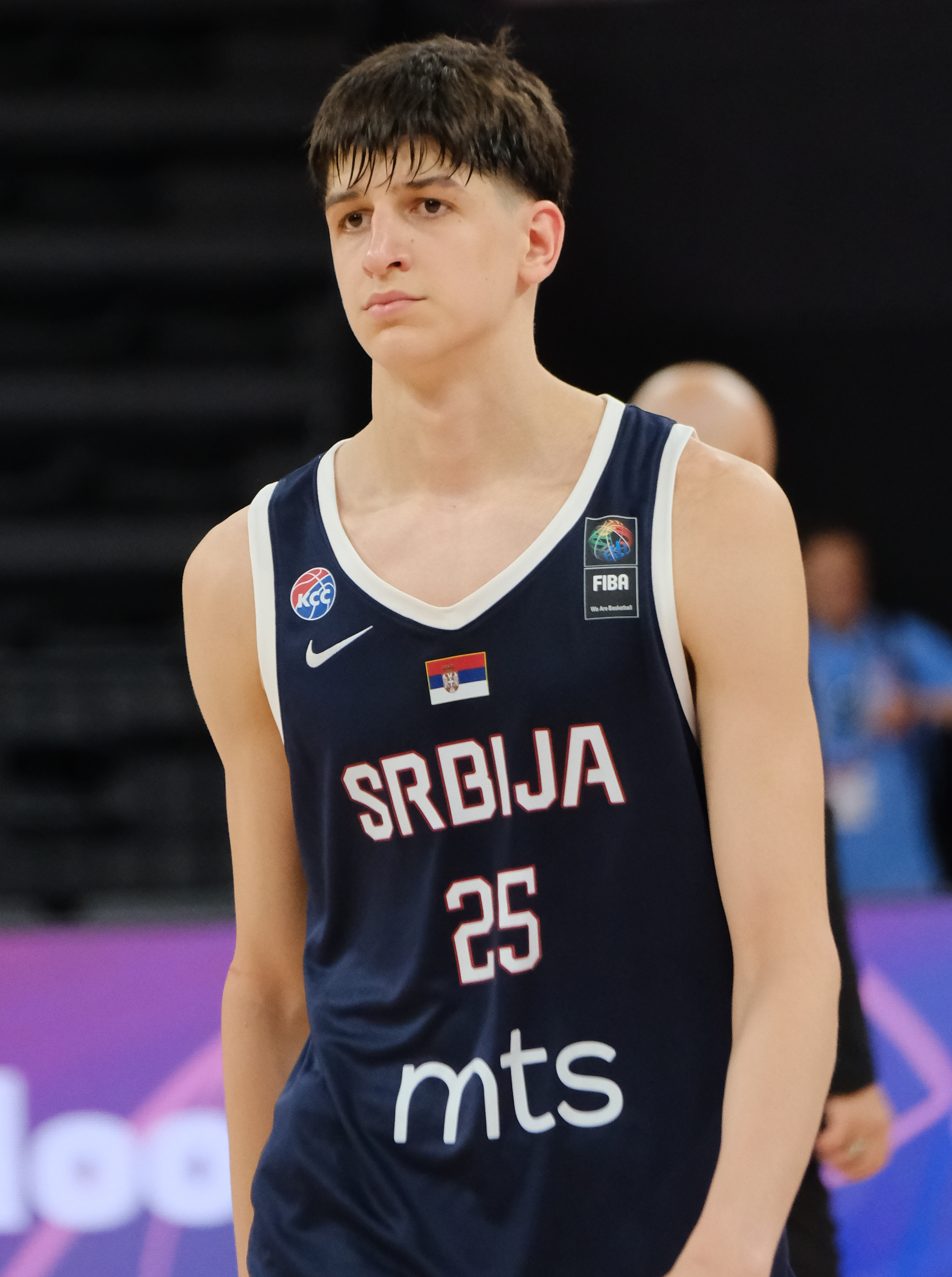
- Kusturica in 2026

No. 17 – UCLA Bruins
- Position: Small forward / shooting guard
- League: Big Ten Conference

Personal information
- Born: 30 April 2009 (age 17) Novi Sad, Serbia
- Listed height: 2.05 m (6 ft 9 in)
- Listed weight: 93 kg (205 lb)

Career information
- College: UCLA (2026–present)
- Playing career: 2025–present

Career history
- 2025–2026: FC Barcelona
- 2025–2026: →FC Barcelona B

Career highlights
- FIBA U16 EuroBasket MVP (2025); EuroLeague NextGen champion (2026)
Medals
Men's basketball
Representing Serbia
FIBA U17 World Cup
Silver medal – second place	2026 Turkey	U17 Team
FIBA U16 EuroBasket
Gold medal – first place	2025 Georgia	U16 Team

Nikola Kusturica (Serbian Cyrillic: Никола Кустурица; born 30 April 2009) is a Serbian college basketball player for the UCLA Bruins of the Big Ten Conference. He previously played professionally for FC Barcelona of the Spanish Liga ACB and EuroLeague. Kusturica was the 2025 FIBA U16 EuroBasket MVP and the 2026 FIBA U17 World Cup Defensive MVP.

== Early life and youth career ==
Kusturica was born in Novi Sad, Serbia, in 2009. He started playing basketball in the youth ranks of his hometown teams KK Defense and KK Star. In the summer of 2023, he signed for FC Barcelona's youth team.

Kusturica took part in the inaugural season of the Liga U with FC Barcelona B. Playing with the youth team, he won the 2026 NextGen EuroLeague regional tournament held in Bologna. In May 2026, Kusturica won the 2025–26 EuroLeague NextGen Final tournament with Barcelona, being the final's top-scorer.

== Professional career ==
=== FC Barcelona (2025–2026) ===
Kusturica made his professional debut on September 17, 2025, playing 11 minutes with the FC Barcelona first team during a Catalan League game against BC Andorra. He scored two points and became the youngest player to ever play an official game for FC Barcelona, surpassing Eric Vila.

Kusturica made his Liga ACB debut on October 12, 2025, playing a few seconds in a game against Hiopos Lleida at the Palau Blaugrana. He became the youngest player to ever play for FC Barcelona in the competition. On December 16, 2025, he made his debut in the EuroLeague, once again becoming the youngest player to play for Barcelona in the competition. In February 2026, he became the youngest player to ever score for Barcelona in a Liga ACB game, scoring 11 points during a home game against BAXI Manresa.

== College career ==
On 9 July 2026, Kusturica reached a multiyear agreement to play at the University of California, Los Angeles, for the Bruins. He had also been recruited by Kentucky, Michigan and Gonzaga. In the Bruins' 2026–27 home opener, he scored 29 points in a 114–63 win over North Florida. He scored 26 of his points in the first half, shooting a perfect 9 of 9 on his field goals, 4 of 4 on 3-pointers and making all four of his free throws.

== National team career ==
In August 2025, Kusturica led the Serbian U16 national team to victory in the 2025 FIBA U16 EuroBasket, in which he was also selected as the tournament's MVP. During the 2026 FIBA Under-17 Basketball World Cup, he led the Serbian U17 national team to its best finish in U17 World Cup history, earning a silver medal. The only other medal earned was a bronze medal in 2014. Kusturica averaged 24.6 points per game and earned Defensive MVP and All-Star Five honors.

== Personal life ==
Kusturica is a distant relative of Serbian filmmaker Emir Kusturica.
