= Mohamed Dabone =

Burkinabé basketball player (born 2011)

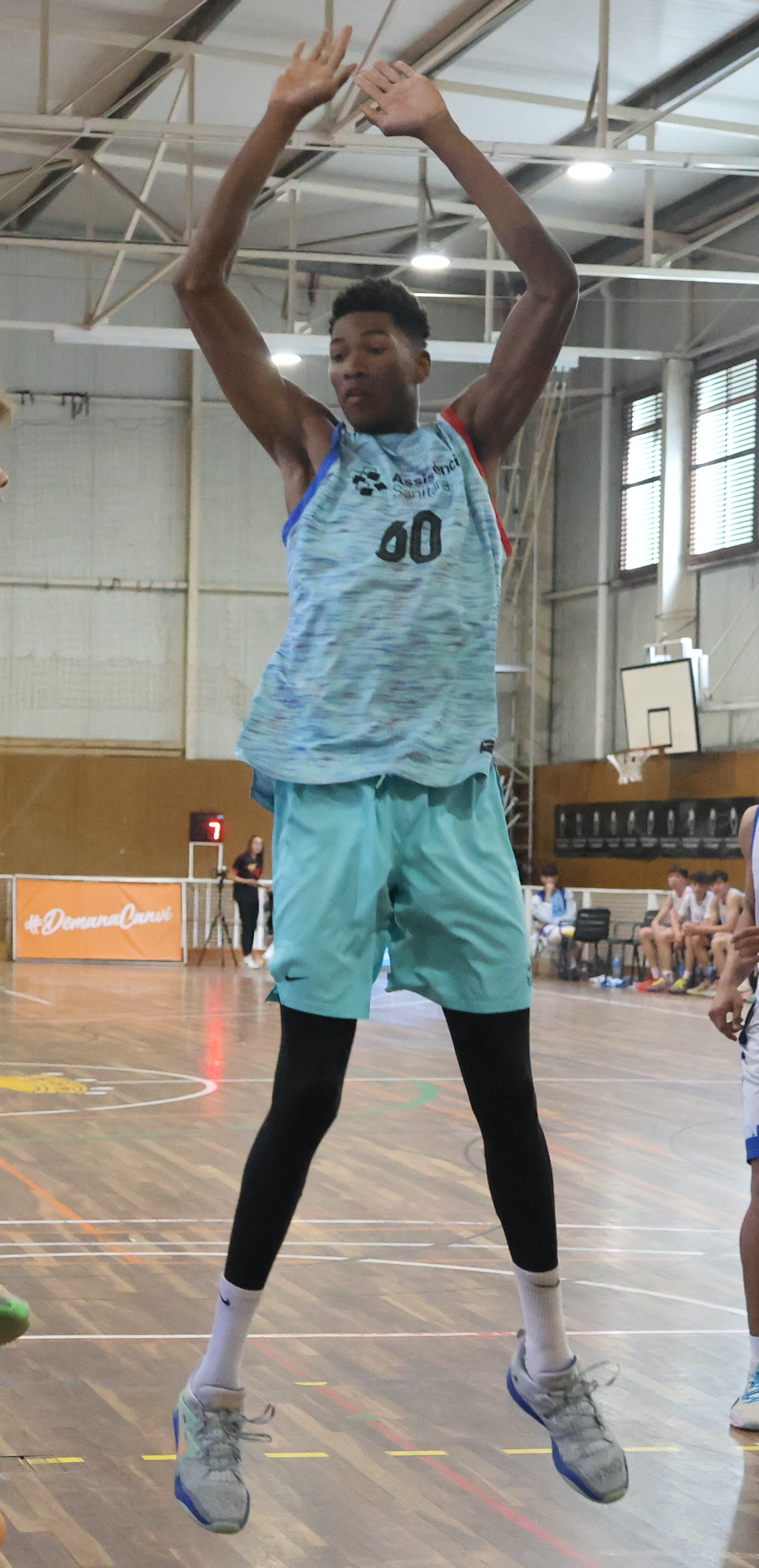
- Dabone with FC Barcelona in 2024

No. 60 – FC Barcelona B
- Position: Center
- League: Liga U

Personal information
- Born: 21 October 2011 (age 15) Burkina Faso
- Listed height: 2.10 m (6 ft 11 in)

Career history
- 2025–present: FC Barcelona
- 2025–present: →FC Barcelona B

Career highlights
- EuroLeague NextGen champion (2026)

Mohamed Samsoudine Dabone (born October 21, 2011) is a Burkinabé basketball player who plays as a center for FC Barcelona Bàsquet. He was born on October 21, 2011 and currently stands at 6 ft 11 in (2.10 m), although his age and nationality are contested. He was called up to Barcelona's first team during pre-season in August 2025 and is considered a future NBA prospect, drawing comparisons to Victor Wembanyama and Giannis Antetokounmpo.

== Youth career ==
Dabone joined FC Barcelona's youth ranks in 2022. In February of 2024, he helped Barcelona win the Minicopa del Rey, one of Spain's major junior basketball tournaments. He was also crowned as the competition's MVP.

Dabone made his debut with the FC Barcelona senior team in a friendly game against Bàsquet Girona on September 12, 2025. Playing for over 9 minutes, he scored 4 points and recorded 3 rebounds.

In May 2026, Dabone won the Final tournament of the 2025–26 EuroLeague Basketball Next Generation Tournament with Barcelona, in which he made the All-Tournament Team.

== Personal life ==
In July 2026, Dabone officially received a Spanish passport and Spanish citizenship.
