= Cameron Houindo =

French basketball player (born 2008)

No. 8 – Cedevita Olimpija
- Position: Power forward
- League: Slovenian League; ABA League; EuroCup

Personal information
- Born: 10 January 2008 (age 18) Sainte-Catherine-lès-Arras, France
- Listed height: 6 ft 9 in (2.06 m)

Career information
- Playing career: 2023–present

Career history
- 2023–2025: Centre Fédéral
- 2025–present: Cedevita Olimpija

Career highlights
- Slovenian League champion (2026); Slovenian Cup champion (2026); Slovenian Supercup (2025); Basketball Without Borders MVP (2026); LNB Young Star Game (2025); FIBA U16 EuroBasket MVP (2024)
Medals
Men's basketball
Representing France
FIBA U18 EuroBasket
Silver medal – second place	2025 Serbia	Team
FIBA U16 EuroBasket
Gold medal – first place	2024 Greece	Team

Cameron Toussaint Selidji Houindo (born 10 January 2008) is a French professional basketball player for KK Cedevita Olimpija of the Slovenian League, the ABA League and the EuroCup.

== Early life and youth career ==
Cameron Toussaint Selidji Houindo was born on 10 January 2008 in Sainte-Catherine-lès-Arras, France. He began playing basketball at two-and-a-half years old and quickly decided he wanted to pursue an athletic career. Houindo started his career with local club BC Saint Nicolas and always played in older age categories due to his size and skill. Nevertheless, he still dominated his peers and was often booed by opposing parents, according to his coach at the time. Houindo continued his development with ABC Dourges and Union Artois Élite Basket before joining the Centre de Ressources, d'Expertise et de Performance Sportives (CREPS) in Wattignies in 2021 for what was originally planned as a two-year program. However, the following year, he was accepted to the National Institute of Sport, Expertise, and Performance (INSEP), located near Paris.

Houindo played with the INSEP U18 team at the 2023–24 EuroLeague NextGen Paris Qualifier, where he averaged four points and 2.3 rebounds per game. The team qualified for the 2023–24 EuroLeague NextGen Final tournament in Berlin, where he averaged six points and 4.5 rebounds per game. The following year, Houindo helped the INSEP U18 team win the 2024–25 EuroLeague NextGen Belgrade Qualifier after averaging 12 points and five rebounds per game. He then played in the 2024–25 EuroLeague NextGen Final tournament in Abu Dhabi, where he averaged 9.7 points and 5.3 rebounds per game.

Houindo helped the KK Cedevita Olimpija U18 team win the 2025–26 EuroLeague NextGen Ulm Qualifier, earning tournament MVP honors after averaging 22 points and 7.5 rebounds per game. In the 2025–26 EuroLeague NextGen Final tournament in Athens, he averaged 21 points and 9.7 rebounds per game.

Houindo participated in the Adidas Eurocamp in Italy in both 2025 and 2026 as a member of Team Next Gen. He also earned MVP honors at the 2026 Basketball Without Borders (BWB) All-Star camp, which was held as part of NBA All-Star Weekend.

== Professional career ==
Houindo played two seasons with the INSEP's professional side, Centre Fédéral, in the third-tier Nationale Masculine 1 (NM1) from 2023 to 2025. He played 27 games in the 2024–25 season, averaging 8.1 points and 3.3 rebounds per game, and was selected to play in the inaugural LNB Young Star Game.

In June 2025, Houindo signed with KK Cedevita Olimpija of the Slovenian League. He took advice from compatriot Joan Beringer, who similarly left France to join the club before he was selected in the 2025 NBA draft. Aside from domestic league competition, Houindo also received minutes playing in the ABA League and the EuroCup. That season, Cedevita Olimpija won the 2025 Slovenian Supercup, the 2026 Slovenian League title, and the 2026 Slovenian Cup.

== Personal life ==
His father, Ghyslain, is originally from Guinea, and played basketball in Benin and South Africa before becoming a lawyer in Lille.
