= 2025 FIBA U16 EuroBasket =

International youth basketball tournament

Tournament details
- Host country: Georgia
- City: Tbilisi
- Dates: 8–16 August 2025
- Teams: 16 (from 1 confederation)
- Venue: 2 (in 1 host city)

Final positions
- Champions: Serbia (2nd title)
- Runners-up: Lithuania
- Third place: Slovenia

Tournament statistics
- Games played: 56
- Attendance: 12,463 (223 per game)
- MVP: (Serbia) Nikola Kusturica
- Top scorer: (Turkey) Ömer Kutluay (169 Pts)

Official website
- www.fiba.basketball

The 2025 FIBA U16 EuroBasket was the 37th edition of the European basketball championship for men's national under-16 teams. The tournament was played in Tbilisi, Georgia, from 8 to 16 August 2025.

== Participating teams ==
- Estonia ▲ (Winners, 2024 FIBA U16 EuroBasket Division B)
- Finland
- France
- Georgia
- Germany
- Greece
- Israel
- Italy
- Latvia
- Lithuania
- Romania ▲ (Runners-up, 2024 FIBA U16 EuroBasket Division B)
- Serbia
- Slovenia
- Spain
- Switzerland ▲ (Third place, 2024 FIBA U16 EuroBasket Division B)
- Turkey

== First round ==
The draw of the first round was held on 28 January 2025 in Freising, Germany.

In the first round, the teams were drawn into four groups of four. All teams advanced to the playoffs.

All times are local (Georgia Time; UTC+4).

=== Group A ===
Pos	Team	Pld	W	L	PF	PA	PD	Pts
1	Turkey	3	3	0	261	194	+67	6
2	Lithuania	3	2	1	241	237	+4	5
3	Israel	3	1	2	234	238	−4	4
4	Estonia	3	0	3	200	267	−67	3

Source: FIBA

8 August 2025
13:30

Boxscore

Estonia	65–85	Lithuania
Scoring by quarter: 13–22, 13–21, 15–21, 24–21
Pts: Tirs 11; Rebs: Poljakov, Kangur 6 Asts: Kangur 8		Pts: Buivydas 17; Rebs: Raščius 12; Asts: Sabeckas 6

Tbilisi Arena
Attendance: 50
Referees: Ritvars Helmšteins (LAT), Mikheil Vartanov (GEO), Vojkan Živković (SRB)

8 August 2025
16:00

Boxscore

Turkey	76–65	Israel
Scoring by quarter: 20–11, 16–19, 20–20, 20–15
Pts: Kutluay 25; Rebs: Elitaş 18; Asts: Karutasu 4		Pts: Orland 17; Rebs: three players 6 Asts: Lewinthal 4

Tbilisi Arena
Attendance: 50
Referees: Alin Faur (ROU), Ioannis Agrafiotis (GRE), Tomasz Langowski (POL)

9 August 2025
13:30

Boxscore

Israel	88–80	Estonia
Scoring by quarter: 18–19, 25–25, 29–17, 16–19
Pts: Lewinthal 24; Rebs: Orland 11; Asts: Orland 6		Pts: Kangur 21; Rebs: Kangur 8 Asts: Kangur 9

Tbilisi Olympic Palace
Attendance: 100
Referees: Valerio Grigioni (ITA), Roberto Martínez (ESP), Denys Povorozniuk (UKR)

9 August 2025
18:30

Boxscore

Lithuania	74–91	Turkey
Scoring by quarter: 15–13, 25–27, 11–26, 23–25
Pts: Sabeckas 17; Rebs: Buivydas 6 Asts: Buivydas, Kukta 5		Pts: Öztürk 21; Rebs: Elitaş 16; Asts: Kutluay 7

Tbilisi Olympic Palace
Attendance: 100
Referees: Zdravko Rutesic (MNE), Gilbert Hoxha (ALB), Sava Ćetković (MNE)

10 August 2025
13:30

Boxscore

Israel	81–82 (OT)	Lithuania
Scoring by quarter: 8–19, 20–17, 28–20, 18–18, Overtime: 7–8
Pts: Orland 25; Rebs: Lewinthal 7 Asts: Lewinthal 3		Pts: Buivydas 18; Rebs: Erlickis 11; Asts: Biržinis 5

Tbilisi Arena
Attendance: 150
Referees: Alin Faur (ROU), Gilbert Hoxha (ALB), Sava Ćetković (MNE)

10 August 2025
16:00

Boxscore

Estonia	55–94	Turkey
Scoring by quarter: 22–22, 17–20, 6–30, 10–22
Pts: Kangur 15; Rebs: Taldrik, Arula 6 Asts: Kangur 4		Pts: Kutluay 21; Rebs: Tolan 10; Asts: Kutluay 4

Tbilisi Olympic Palace
Attendance: 50
Referees: Zdravko Rutesic (MNE), Ioannis Agrafiotis (GRE), Tomasz Langowski (POL)

=== Group B ===
Pos	Team	Pld	W	L	PF	PA	PD	Pts
1	France	3	3	0	282	150	+132	6
2	Slovenia	3	2	1	217	214	+3	5
3	Switzerland	3	1	2	176	239	−63	4
4	Finland	3	0	3	180	252	−72	3

Source: FIBA

8 August 2025
13:30

Boxscore

Switzerland	36–101	France
Scoring by quarter: 13–19, 8–26, 10–24, 5–32
Pts: Lebrun 10; Rebs: Egwuatu 7 Asts: Shane, Corzani 2		Pts: Soliman 13; Rebs: Soliman 10; Asts: Nnanga Ahanda, Towo-Nansi 4

Tbilisi Olympic Palace
Attendance: 50
Referees: Zdravko Rutešić (MNE), Gilbert Hoxha (ALB), Sava Četković (MNE)

8 August 2025
16:00

Boxscore

Finland	63–82	Slovenia
Scoring by quarter: 14–26, 18–18, 16–22, 15–16
Pts: Kyntölä, Varila 10; Rebs: Tala 11; Asts: Ikäläinen, Hopkins 3		Pts: Jarc 14; Rebs: Ilić 8 Asts: Pregl 4

Tbilisi Olympic Palace
Attendance: 50
Referees: Valerio Grigioni (ITA), Roberto Martínez (ESP), Vlad-Theodor Cotrobas-Dascalu (ROU)

9 August 2025
13:30

Boxscore

Slovenia	76–66	Switzerland
Scoring by quarter: 23–21, 16–12, 19–12, 18–21
Pts: Rožnik 20; Rebs: Pregl 7 Asts: Tršan 6		Pts: Beya, Shane 10; Rebs: Shane 9 Asts: Orsenigo 5

Tbilisi Arena
Attendance: 100
Referees: Ritvars Helmsteins (LAT), Mikheil Vartanov (GEO), Vlad-Theodor Cotrobas-Dascalu (ROU)

9 August 2025
16:00

Boxscore

France	96–55	Finland
Scoring by quarter: 24–20, 16–12, 24–14, 32–9
Pts: Soliman 21; Rebs: Soliman 9 Asts: Towo-Nansi 8		Pts: Tala 16; Rebs: Tala 11; Asts: Ikäläinen 5

Tbilisi Arena
Attendance: 800
Referees: Alin Faur (ROU), Ioannis Agrafiotis (GRE), Vojkan Živković (SRB)

10 August 2025
13:30

Boxscore

Slovenia	59–85	France
Scoring by quarter: 14–22, 10–21, 16–22, 19–20
Pts: Rezec 13; Rebs: Rezec 6 Asts: Pejić Rupnik 7		Pts: Soliman 20; Rebs: Soliman 10; Asts: Towo-Nansi 3

Tbilisi Olympic Palace
Referees: Valerio Grigioni (ITA), Roberto Martínez (ESP), Vlad-Theodor Cotrobas-Dascalu (ROU)

10 August 2025
21:00

Boxscore

Switzerland	74–62	Finland
Scoring by quarter: 8–12, 17–11, 17–19, 32–20
Pts: Riboni 23; Rebs: Corzani 6 Asts: Orsenigo 5		Pts: Ikäläinen 12; Rebs: Bangura 9 Asts: Ikäläinen 5

Tbilisi Olympic Palace
Attendance: 75
Referees: Ritvars Helmšteins (LAT), Mikheil Vartanov (GEO), Vojkan Živković (SRB)

=== Group C ===
Pos	Team	Pld	W	L	PF	PA	PD	Pts
1	Spain	3	3	0	277	231	+46	6
2	Serbia	3	2	1	280	220	+60	5
3	Germany	3	1	2	208	233	−25	4
4	Georgia	3	0	3	201	282	−81	3

Source: FIBA

8 August 2025
18:30

Boxscore

Georgia	73–98	Spain
Scoring by quarter: 15–23, 22–15, 14–31, 22–29
Pts: Trapaidze 23; Rebs: Pochkhua 6 Asts: Patashuri 5		Pts: Villarejo, Parra 13; Rebs: Ruiz, Corta 7 Asts: three players 3

Tbilisi Arena
Attendance: 3,000
Referees: Alakbar Hasanov (AZE), Orhan Çağrı Hekimoğlu (TUR), Rainis Värv (EST)

8 August 2025
21:00

Boxscore

Germany	60–86	Serbia
Scoring by quarter: 23–23, 6–23, 15–25, 16–15
Pts: Volf 12; Rebs: Beard 7 Asts: Heithausen, Jerkic 3		Pts: Simjanovski 15; Rebs: Bjelica 7 Asts: Lukić 5

Tbilisi Arena
Attendance: 50
Referees: Can Mavisu (TUR), Aurimas Borusas (LTU), Denys Povorozniuk (UKR)

9 August 2025
18:30

Boxscore

Serbia	99–63	Georgia
Scoring by quarter: 24–16, 31–17, 30–19, 14–11
Pts: Lukić, Kusturica 14; Rebs: Lukić 6 Asts: Stepanović, Simjanovski 4		Pts: Pochkhua 11; Rebs: Aubakirov 5 Asts: Patashuri 7

Tbilisi Arena
Attendance: 500
Referees: Edgard Ceccarelli (FRA), Elias Anttonen (FIN), Rainis Värv (EST)

9 August 2025
21:00

Boxscore

Spain	82–63	Germany
Scoring by quarter: 27–14, 18–25, 16–7, 21–17
Pts: Cerdán 18; Rebs: Cerdán 10; Asts: Tazo 8		Pts: Volf 11; Rebs: Tchouaffe 9 Asts: Drucke, Tchouaffe 3

Tbilisi Olympic Palace
Attendance: 200
Referees: Can Mavisu (TUR), Roko Hordov (CRO), Hendrik Laas (EST)

10 August 2025
18:30

Boxscore

Georgia	65–85	Germany
Scoring by quarter: 15–25, 24–23, 8–19, 18–18
Pts: Trapaidze 20; Rebs: Pochkhua 9 Asts: Trapaidze 6		Pts: Plato 21; Rebs: Youdom 11; Asts: Drucke 6

Tbilisi Arena
Attendance: 400
Referees: Can Mavisu (TUR), Roko Hordov (CRO), Hendrik Laas (EST)

10 August 2025
18:30

Boxscore

Serbia	95–97	Spain
Scoring by quarter: 29–24, 19–22, 18–28, 29–23
Pts: Kusturica 27; Rebs: Bjelica 13; Asts: Bjelica 7		Pts: Villarejo, Cerdán 17; Rebs: Villarejo 8 Asts: Poza 8

Tbilisi Olympic Palace
Attendance: 200
Referees: Edgard Ceccarelli (FRA), Aurimas Borusas (LTU), Rainis Värv (EST)

=== Group D ===
Pos	Team	Pld	W	L	PF	PA	PD	Pts
1	Latvia	3	3	0	236	199	+37	6
2	Italy	3	2	1	220	196	+24	5
3	Greece	3	1	2	199	207	−8	4
4	Romania	3	0	3	218	271	−53	3

Source: FIBA

8 August 2025
18:30

Boxscore

Romania	69–105	Italy
Scoring by quarter: 16–25, 15–25, 15–20, 23–35
Pts: Bănică 25; Rebs: Bănică 10; Asts: Gae 3		Pts: Nicolodi 21; Rebs: Sguazzin 6 Asts: three players 4

Tbilisi Olympic Palace
Attendance: 50
Referees: Roko Hordov (CRO), Elias Anttonen (FIN), Martin Demierre (SUI)

8 August 2025
21:00

Boxscore

Latvia	74–68	Greece
Scoring by quarter: 15–30, 24–11, 13–14, 22–13
Pts: Pogiņš 21; Rebs: Beruē 14; Asts: Latiševs 7		Pts: Zoupas 28; Rebs: Zoupas, Vontas 7 Asts: Ioannidis 4

Tbilisi Olympic Palace
Attendance: 50
Referees: Edgard Ceccarelli (FRA), Domen Krajnc (SLO), Hendrik Laas (EST)

9 August 2025
16:00

Boxscore

Italy	49–70	Latvia
Scoring by quarter: 15–20, 12–15, 14–16, 8–19
Pts: Sguazzin 14; Rebs: Milazzo, Alba 6 Asts: three players 2		Pts: Beruē 16; Rebs: Ķesteris 13; Asts: Latiševs, Krastiņš 3

Tbilisi Olympic Palace
Attendance: 50
Referees: Orhan Çağrı Hekimoğlu (TUR), Aurimas Borusas (LTU), Tomasz Langowski (POL)

9 August 2025
21:00

Boxscore

Greece	74–67	Romania
Scoring by quarter: 13–12, 24–15, 15–20, 22–20
Pts: Zoupas 22; Rebs: Papaioannou 8 Asts: Manis 7		Pts: Bănică, Miron 14; Rebs: Stănescu 10; Asts: Gae 5

Tbilisi Arena
Attendance: 150
Referees: Alakbar Hasanov (AZE), Domen Krajnc (SLO), Martin Demierre (SUI)

10 August 2025
16:00

Boxscore

Greece	57–66	Italy
Scoring by quarter: 16–16, 12–21, 10–11, 19–18
Pts: Zoupas 18; Rebs: Zoupas, Asonitis 5 Asts: Meggos, Messiniotis 4		Pts: Ruggeri 12; Rebs: Ruggeri, Alba 10; Asts: Machetti 6

Tbilisi Arena
Attendance: 100
Referees: Orhan Çağrı Hekimoğlu (TUR), Domen Krajnc (SLO), Martin Demierre (SUI)

10 August 2025
21:00

Boxscore

Romania	82–92	Latvia
Scoring by quarter: 20–26, 19–10, 17–29, 26–27
Pts: Kovacs 19; Rebs: Stănescu 9 Asts: Kovacs, Bernat 3		Pts: Vilcāns 17; Rebs: Beruē 14; Asts: Jeromanovs 8

Tbilisi Arena
Attendance: 100
Referees: Alakbar Hasanov (AZE), Elias Anttonen (FIN), Denys Povorozniuk (UKR)

== Brackets ==
=== Main bracket ===
Round of 16
12 August
A1 Turkey	84
B4 Finland	52
12 August
C2 Serbia	92
D3 Greece	65
12 August
B2 Slovenia	87
A3 Israel	66
12 August
D1 Latvia	106
C4 Georgia	54
12 August
A2 Lithuania	92
B3 Switzerland	50
12 August
C1 Spain	97
D4 Romania	72
12 August
B1 France	114
A4 Estonia	56
12 August
D2 Italy	85
C3 Germany	65

Quarterfinals
13 August
A1 Turkey	73
C2 Serbia	94
13 August
B2 Slovenia	80
D1 Latvia	74
13 August
A2 Lithuania	93
C1 Spain	90
13 August
B1 France	73
D2 Italy	76

Semifinals
15 August
C2 Serbia	90
B2 Slovenia	58
15 August
A2 Lithuania	91
D2 Italy	81

Final
16 August
C2 Serbia	99
A2 Lithuania	86
3rd place match
16 August
B2 Slovenia	79
D2 Italy	71

=== 5th place bracket ===
5th–8th place semifinals
15 August
A1 Turkey	80
D1 Latvia	88
15 August
C1 Spain	69
B1 France	95

5th place match
16 August
D1 Latvia	66
B1 France	90
7th place match
16 August
A1 Turkey	89
C1 Spain	74

=== 9th place bracket ===
9th–16th place quarterfinals
13 August
B4 Finland	70
D3 Greece	85
13 August
A3 Israel	66
C4 Georgia	70
13 August
B3 Switzerland	53
D4 Romania	67
13 August
A4 Estonia	77
C3 Germany	87

9th–12th place semifinals
15 August
D3 Greece	65
C4 Georgia	50
15 August
D4 Romania	73
C3 Germany	99

9th place match
16 August
D3 Greece	62
C3 Germany	74
11th place match
16 August
C4 Georgia	88
D4 Romania	84

=== 13th place bracket ===
13th–16th place semifinals
15 August
B4 Finland	71
A3 Israel	72
15 August
B3 Switzerland	70
A4 Estonia	83

13th place match
16 August
A3 Israel	91
A4 Estonia	70
15th place match
16 August
B4 Finland	63
B3 Switzerland	53

== Playoff results ==
=== Round of 16 ===
12 August 2025
13:30

Boxscore

Lithuania	92–50	Switzerland
Scoring by quarter: 21–11, 21–13, 24–13, 26–13
Pts: Šiškauskas 16; Rebs: Biržinis 8 Asts: Buivydas 6		Pts: Lebrun 14; Rebs: Paraiso 7 Asts: Lebrun, Sivickas 2

Tbilisi Olympic Palace
Referees: Valerio Grigioni (ITA), Ioannis Agrafiotis (GRE), Vojkan Živković (SRB)

12 August 2025
13:30

Boxscore

Italy	85–65	Germany
Scoring by quarter: 22–14, 25–17, 16–18, 22–16
Pts: Nicolodi 24; Rebs: Ventura 6 Asts: Milazzo 8		Pts: Youdom 16; Rebs: Youdom 6 Asts: Drucke 5

Tbilisi Arena
Attendance: 150
Referees: Orhan Çağrı Hekimoğlu (TUR), Elias Anttonen (FIN), Denys Povorozniuk (UKR)

12 August 2025
16:00

Boxscore

France	114–56	Estonia
Scoring by quarter: 29–14, 24–16, 27–13, 34–13
Pts: Soliman 20; Rebs: Soliman 7 Asts: Towo-Nansi 9		Pts: Kaljula 12; Rebs: Arula 4 Asts: three players 3

Tbilisi Arena
Attendance: 50
Referees: Ritvars Helmšteins (LAT), Mikheil Vartanov (GEO), Sava Ćetković (MNE)

12 August 2025
16:00

Boxscore

Spain	97–72	Romania
Scoring by quarter: 26–18, 29–19, 20–17, 22–18
Pts: Ferreras 18; Rebs: Graae 9 Asts: Filba 7		Pts: Lăpuște 13; Rebs: Tancau 6 Asts: Gae 6

Tbilisi Olympic Palace
Referees: Edgard Ceccarelli (FRA), Domen Krajnc (SLO), Rainis Värv (EST)

12 August 2025
18:30

Boxscore

Turkey	84–52	Finland
Scoring by quarter: 19–17, 20–5, 27–6, 18–24
Pts: Karutasu, Tolan 19; Rebs: Tolan 10; Asts: Kutluay 8		Pts: Hopkins 13; Rebs: five players 4 Asts: three players 2

Tbilisi Olympic Palace
Attendance: 100
Referees: Alin Faur (ROU), Roko Hordov (CRO), Martin Demierre (SUI)

12 August 2025
18:30

Boxscore

Latvia	106–54	Georgia
Scoring by quarter: 24–16, 23–17, 26–14, 33–7
Pts: Kesteris 19; Rebs: Pogiņš 8 Asts: Jeromanovs 6		Pts: Trapaidze, Aubakirov 12; Rebs: Shervashidze, Patashuri 5 Asts: Patashuri 5

Tbilisi Arena
Attendance: 500
Referees: Can Mavisu (TUR), Roberto Lucas Martínez (ESP), Hendrik Laas (EST)

12 August 2025
21:00

Boxscore

Slovenia	87–66	Israel
Scoring by quarter: 18–14, 18–15, 29–15, 22–22
Pts: Rezec 20; Rebs: Rožnik 11; Asts: Pregl 7		Pts: Aronov 12; Rebs: Lewinthal 7 Asts: Aronov 4

Tbilisi Arena
Attendance: 50
Referees: Zdravko Rutešić (MNE), Gilbert Hoxha (ALB), Vlad-Theodor Cotrobas-Dascalu (ROU)

12 August 2025
21:00

Boxscore

Serbia	92–65	Greece
Scoring by quarter: 20–20, 33–17, 17–15, 22–13
Pts: Bjelica 20; Rebs: Bjelica 15; Asts: Simjanovski 6		Pts: Zoupas 22; Rebs: Meggos 7 Asts: Messiniotis 5

Tbilisi Olympic Palace
Attendance: 100
Referees: Alakbar Hasanov (AZE), Aurimas Borusas (LTU), Tomasz Langowski (POL)

=== 9th–16th place quarterfinals ===
13 August 2025
13:30

Boxscore

Estonia	77–87	Germany
Scoring by quarter: 15–24, 25–18, 17–24, 20–21
Pts: Arula 21; Rebs: Arula 11; Asts: Talviste, Kangur 5		Pts: Jerkic 21; Rebs: Plato 13; Asts: Drucke, Rieck 4

Tbilisi Olympic Palace
Attendance: 100
Referees: Orhan Çağrı Hekimoğlu (TUR), Elias Anttonen (FIN), Vojkan Živković (SRB)

13 August 2025
16:00

Boxscore

Switzerland	53–67	Romania
Scoring by quarter: 14–21, 15–22, 13–10, 11–14
Pts: Lebrun 8 Rebs: Kamtchoua Nana 9 Asts: Orsenigo 6		Pts: Gae 18; Rebs: Bănică 12; Asts: Lăpuște 7

Tbilisi Olympic Palace
Attendance: 100
Referees: Valerio Grigioni (ITA), Mikheil Vartanov (GEO), Denys Povorozniuk (UKR)

13 August 2025
18:30

Boxscore

Israel	66–70	Georgia
Scoring by quarter: 14–22, 12–15, 17–15, 23–18
Pts: Lewinthal 22; Rebs: Orland 9 Asts: Orland, Abouloff 3		Pts: Pochkhua 14; Rebs: Shervashidze 10; Asts: Trapaidze, Patashuri 4

Tbilisi Olympic Palace
Attendance: 150
Referees: Alin Faur (ROU), Domen Krajnc (SLO), Martin Demierre (SUI)

13 August 2025
21:00

Boxscore

Finland	70–85	Greece
Scoring by quarter: 20–18, 10–22, 22–18, 18–27
Pts: Tala 13; Rebs: Tala 8 Asts: Kyntölä 5		Pts: Zoupas 25; Rebs: Vontas 7 Asts: three players 4

Tbilisi Olympic Palace
Attendance: 40
Referees: Can Mavisu (TUR), Roberto Lucas Martínez (ESP), Vlad-Theodor Cotrobaș-Dascălu (ROU)

=== 13th–16th place semifinals ===
15 August 2025
13:30

Boxscore

Switzerland	70–83	Estonia
Scoring by quarter: 15–15, 18–22, 19–30, 18–16
Pts: Riboni 15; Rebs: Riboni 6 Asts: Orsenigo 7		Pts: Kangur 18; Rebs: Taldrik, Arula 6 Asts: Talviste 6

Tbilisi Olympic Palace
Attendance: 50
Referees: Alin Faur (ROU), Gilbert Hoxha (ALB), Denys Povorozniuk (UKR)

15 August 2025
16:00

Boxscore

Finland	71–72	Israel
Scoring by quarter: 17–17, 9–6, 23–25, 22–24
Pts: Tala 19; Rebs: Tala 11; Asts: Kyntölä 5		Pts: Lewinthal 28; Rebs: Orland 8 Asts: Orland 8

Tbilisi Olympic Palace
Referees: Edgard Ceccarelli (FRA), Domen Krajnc (SLO), Vlad-Theodor Cotrobas-Dascalu (ROU)

=== 15th place match ===
16 August 2025
11:30

Boxscore

Finland	63–53	Switzerland
Scoring by quarter: 11–19, 12–16, 16–9, 24–9
Pts: Humpert 16; Rebs: Tala 7 Asts: Kyntölä 4		Pts: Solazzi 13; Rebs: Kamtchoua Nana, Corzani 7 Asts: Paraiso 3

Tbilisi Olympic Palace
Attendance: 40
Referees: Alin Faur (ROU), Roberto Lucas Martínez (ESP), Vojkan Živković (SRB)

=== 13th place match ===
16 August 2025
13:30

Boxscore

Israel	91–70	Estonia
Scoring by quarter: 28–19, 19–11, 16–19, 28–21
Pts: Sokolovski 32; Rebs: Sokolovski 9 Asts: Abouloff 7		Pts: Kangur 16; Rebs: Kangur 8 Asts: Arula 6

Tbilisi Arena
Attendance: 50
Referees: Ritvars Helmšteins (LAT), Tomasz Langowski (POL), Denys Povorozniuk (UKR)

=== 9th–12th place semifinals ===
15 August 2025
18:30

Boxscore

Romania	73–99	Germany
Scoring by quarter: 17–36, 18–21, 21–20, 17–22
Pts: Stănescu 14; Rebs: Kovács, Lăpuște 4 Asts: Lăpuște 6		Pts: Volf, Plato 20; Rebs: Plato 10; Asts: Tchouaffe, Youdom 5

Tbilisi Olympic Palace
Attendance: 30
Referees: Aurimas Borušas (LTU), Roberto Lucas Martínez (ESP), Vojkan Živković (SRB)

15 August 2025
21:00

Boxscore

Greece	65–50	Georgia
Scoring by quarter: 13–16, 11–10, 22–12, 19–12
Pts: Zoupas 24; Rebs: Ioannidis 6 Asts: Manis 6		Pts: Patashuri 19; Rebs: Pochkhua 6 Asts: Patashuri 5

Tbilisi Olympic Palace
Attendance: 150
Referees: Can Mavisu (TUR), Elias Anttonen (FIN), Martin Demierre (SUI)

=== 11th place match ===
16 August 2025
14:30

Boxscore

Georgia	88–84	Romania
Scoring by quarter: 23–20, 24–17, 18–24, 23–23
Pts: Pochkhua 23; Rebs: Pochkhua 8 Asts: Trapaidze, Patashuri 6		Pts: Gae 17; Rebs: Stănescu 10; Asts: Gae 5

Tbilisi Olympic Palace
Attendance: 500
Referees: Can Mavisu (TUR), Domen Krajnc (SLO), Martin Demierre (SUI)

=== 9th place match ===
16 August 2025
17:00

Boxscore

Greece	62–74	Germany
Scoring by quarter: 11–15, 12–21, 20–25, 19–13
Pts: Kapirelis 17; Rebs: Meggos, Kapirelis 5 Asts: three players 3		Pts: Plato 20; Rebs: Drucke, Plato 7 Asts: Drucke, Rieck 4

Tbilisi Olympic Palace
Attendance: 30
Referees: Valerio Grigioni (ITA), Elias Anttonen (FIN), Vlad-Theodor Cotrobaș-Dascălu (ROU)

=== Championship quarterfinals ===
13 August 2025
13:30

Boxscore

France	73–76	Italy
Scoring by quarter: 28–23, 13–16, 20–17, 12–20
Pts: Soliman 21; Rebs: Soliman 9 Asts: Towo-Nansi 6		Pts: Machetti 27; Rebs: Ruggeri 7 Asts: Machetti 4

Tbilisi Arena
Attendance: 68
Referees: Ritvars Helmšteins (LAT), Roko Hordov (CRO), Hendrik Laas (EST)

13 August 2025
16:00

Boxscore

Lithuania	93–90	Spain
Scoring by quarter: 27–33, 27–15, 20–18, 19–24
Pts: Kukta 29; Rebs: Erlickis 10; Asts: Stankevičius 8		Pts: Villarejo 23; Rebs: Corta 10; Asts: Tazo 9

Tbilisi Arena
Referees: Zdravko Rutešić (MNE), Ioannis Agrafiotis (GRE), Sava Ćetković (MNE)

13 August 2025
18:30

Boxscore

Slovenia	80–74	Latvia
Scoring by quarter: 18–20, 25–20, 16–18, 21–16
Pts: Rezec 28; Rebs: Rožnik 8 Asts: Pejić Rupnik, Jarc 4		Pts: Ķesteris 16; Rebs: Beruē 9 Asts: Jeromanovs 4

Tbilisi Arena
Attendance: 200
Referees: Alakbar Hasanov (AZE), Gilbert Hoxha (ALB), Tomasz Langowski (POL)

13 August 2025
21:00

Boxscore

Turkey	73–94	Serbia
Scoring by quarter: 18–29, 25–16, 12–18, 18–31
Pts: Kutluay 32; Rebs: Elitaş 10; Asts: Kutluay 8		Pts: Kusturica 30; Rebs: Kusturica 12; Asts: Bjelica 6

Tbilisi Arena
Attendance: 100
Referees: Edgard Ceccarelli (FRA), Aurimas Borusas (LTU), Rainis Värv (EST)

=== 5th–8th place semifinals ===
15 August 2025
13:30

Boxscore

Spain	69–95	France
Scoring by quarter: 19–28, 20–17, 14–25, 16–25
Pts: Ruiz 16; Rebs: Corta 8 Asts: Tazo 4		Pts: Soliman 26; Rebs: Soliman 18; Asts: Towo-Nansi 9

Tbilisi Arena
Attendance: 140
Referees: Zdravko Rutešić (MNE), Roko Hordov (CRO), Rainis Värv (EST)

15 August 2025
16:00

Boxscore

Turkey	80–88	Latvia
Scoring by quarter: 16–29, 24–20, 28–17, 12–22
Pts: Kutluay 25; Rebs: Karutasu 7 Asts: Kutluay 7		Pts: Ķesteris, Jahovičš 16; Rebs: Steckis 10; Asts: Jeromanovs 5

Tbilisi Arena
Attendance: 90
Referees: Valerio Grigioni (ITA), Mikheil Vartanov (GEO), Tomasz Langowski (POL)

=== 7th place match ===
16 August 2025
12:00

Boxscore

Turkey	89–74	Spain
Scoring by quarter: 24–21, 15–15, 21–21, 29–17
Pts: Kutluay 31; Rebs: three players 7 Asts: Kutluay 5		Pts: Ferreras 17; Rebs: three players 6 Asts: Tazo 6

Tbilisi Olympic Palace
Referees: Mikheil Vartanov (GEO), Gilbert Hoxha (ALB), Hendrik Laas (EST)

=== 5th place match ===
16 August 2025
14:00

Boxscore

Latvia	66–90	France
Scoring by quarter: 11–28, 20–27, 22–24, 13–11
Pts: Latiševs 14; Rebs: Steckis 6 Asts: three players 4		Pts: Yangala 22; Rebs: Yangala 10; Asts: Towo-Nansi 7

Tbilisi Arena
Attendance: 150
Referees: Zdravko Rutešić (MNE), Roko Hordov (CRO), Sava Četković (MNE)

=== Championship semifinals ===
15 August 2025
18:30

Boxscore

Lithuania	91–81	Italy
Scoring by quarter: 27–17, 17–17, 29–24, 18–23
Pts: Buivydas 17; Rebs: Erlickis, Biržinis 9 Asts: Buivydas 7		Pts: Sguazzin 14; Rebs: Ruggeri 9 Asts: Ruggeri 5

Tbilisi Arena
Attendance: 300
Referees: Alakbar Hasanov (AZE), Ioannis Agrafiotis (GRE), Sava Četković (MNE)

15 August 2025
21:00

Boxscore

Serbia	90–58	Slovenia
Scoring by quarter: 26–17, 19–6, 22–21, 23–14
Pts: Simjanovski 24; Rebs: Bjelica 12; Asts: Bjelica 5		Pts: Rožnik 14; Rebs: Rožnik 9 Asts: Pejić Rupnik, Tršan 4

Tbilisi Arena
Attendance: 150
Referees: Orhan Çağrı Hekimoğlu (TUR), Ritvars Helmšteins (LAT), Hendrik Laas (EST)

=== 3rd place match ===
16 August 2025
16:30

Boxscore

Slovenia	79–71	Italy
Scoring by quarter: 26–22, 18–15, 16–14, 19–20
Pts: Jarc 27; Rebs: Rezec, Jarc 5 Asts: Jarc 6		Pts: Ventura 15; Rebs: Alba 11; Asts: Machetti 11

Tbilisi Arena
Attendance: 150
Referees: Alakbar Hasanov (AZE), Orhan Çağrı Hekimoğlu (TUR), Aurimas Borusas (LTU)

=== Final ===
16 August 2025
19:00

Boxscore

Serbia	99–86	Lithuania
Scoring by quarter: 24–27, 19–26, 32–15, 24–18
Pts: Bjelica 25; Rebs: Kusturica 14; Asts: Kusturica 8		Pts: Buivydas 26; Rebs: Buivydas 7 Asts: Buivydas, Kukta 4

Tbilisi Arena
Attendance: 2,500
Referees: Edgard Ceccarelli (FRA), Ioannis Agrafiotis (GRE), Rainis Värv (EST)

== Final standings ==
Rank	Team	Record
1st place, gold medalist(s)	Serbia	6–1
2nd place, silver medalist(s)	Lithuania	5–2
3rd place, bronze medalist(s)	Slovenia	5–2
4	Italy	4–3
5	France	6–1
6	Latvia	5–2
7	Turkey	5–2
8	Spain	4–3
9	Germany	4–3
10	Greece	3–4
11	Georgia	2–5
12	Romania	1–6
13	Israel	3–4
14	Estonia	1–6
15	Finland	1–6
16	Switzerland	1–6

Qualified for the 2026 FIBA Under-17 Basketball World Cup
Qualified for the 2026 FIBA Under-17 Basketball World Cup as host nation
Relegated to the 2026 FIBA U16 EuroBasket Division B

== Statistics and awards ==
=== Statistical leaders ===
==== Players ====
Points

Name	PPG
(Turkey) Ömer Kutluay	24.1
(Greece) Angelos Zoupas	20.6
(France) Nathan Soliman	20.0
(Serbia) Nikola Kusturica	20.0
(Israel) Eshel Lewinthal	18.4

Blocks

Name	BPG
(France) Messi Yangala	1.9
(France) Nathan Soliman	1.9
(Israel) Yehonatan Silbershtein	1.9
(Latvia) Roberts Bērziņš	1.7
(Serbia) Nikola Kusturica	1.6
(Germany) Paul-Julius Plato	1.6
(Latvia) Benjamin Berrouet	1.6

Rebounds

Name	RPG
(Turkey) Ömer Alp Elitaş	10.6
(France) Nathan Soliman	10.0
(Serbia) Petar Bjelica	9.7
(Latvia) Benjamin Berrouet	9.3
(Finland) Joseph Tala	8.3

Steals

Name	SPG
(France) Aaron Towo-Nansi	4.0
(Slovenia) Martin Tršan	4.0
(Romania) Sebastian-Petru Lăpuște	2.9
(France) Alassane Traoré	2.7
(Italy) Nicolo Ronci	2.7

Assists

Name	APG
(France) Aaron Towo-Nansi	6.6
(Turkey) Ömer Kutluay	6.0
(Estonia) Robert Kangur	5.3
(Spain) Guillem Tazo	5.1
(Georgia (country)) Saba Patashuri	5.0

Efficiency

Name	EFFPG
(France) Nathan Soliman	26.1
(Serbia) Petar Bjelica	25.1
(Serbia) Nikola Kusturica	23.9
(Turkey) Ömer Kutluay	21.4
(Germany) Paul-Julius Plato	19.4
(Greece) Angelos Zoupas	19.4

==== Teams ====
Points

Name	PPG
Serbia	93.6
France	93.4
Spain	86.7
Lithuania	86.1
Turkey	83.9

Blocks

Name	BPG
Latvia	6.7
France	6.6
Serbia	5.9
Spain	5.1
Turkey	4.7

Rebounds

Name	RPG
Latvia	46.9
Serbia	45.4
France	44.9
Turkey	44.1
Spain	43.4

Steals

Name	SPG
France	18.7
Italy	13.6
Romania	12.3
Spain	12.0
Turkey	11.6

Assists

Name	APG
France	23.3
Spain	22.0
Lithuania	21.1
Serbia	21.1
Slovenia	18.1

Efficiency

Name	EFFPG
France	122.3
Serbia	114.9
Spain	97.6
Turkey	96.1
Lithuania	95.0

=== Awards ===
The awards were announced on 16 August 2025.

Award	Player
All-Tournament Team	(Serbia) Nikola Kusturica
All-Tournament Team	(Lithuania) Gabrielius Buivydas
All-Tournament Team	(Serbia) Petar Bjelica
All-Tournament Team	(France) Nathan Soliman
All-Tournament Team	(Slovenia) Lun Jarc
Most Valuable Player	(Serbia) Nikola Kusturica
