= Ömer Kutluay =

Turkish basketball player (born 2009)

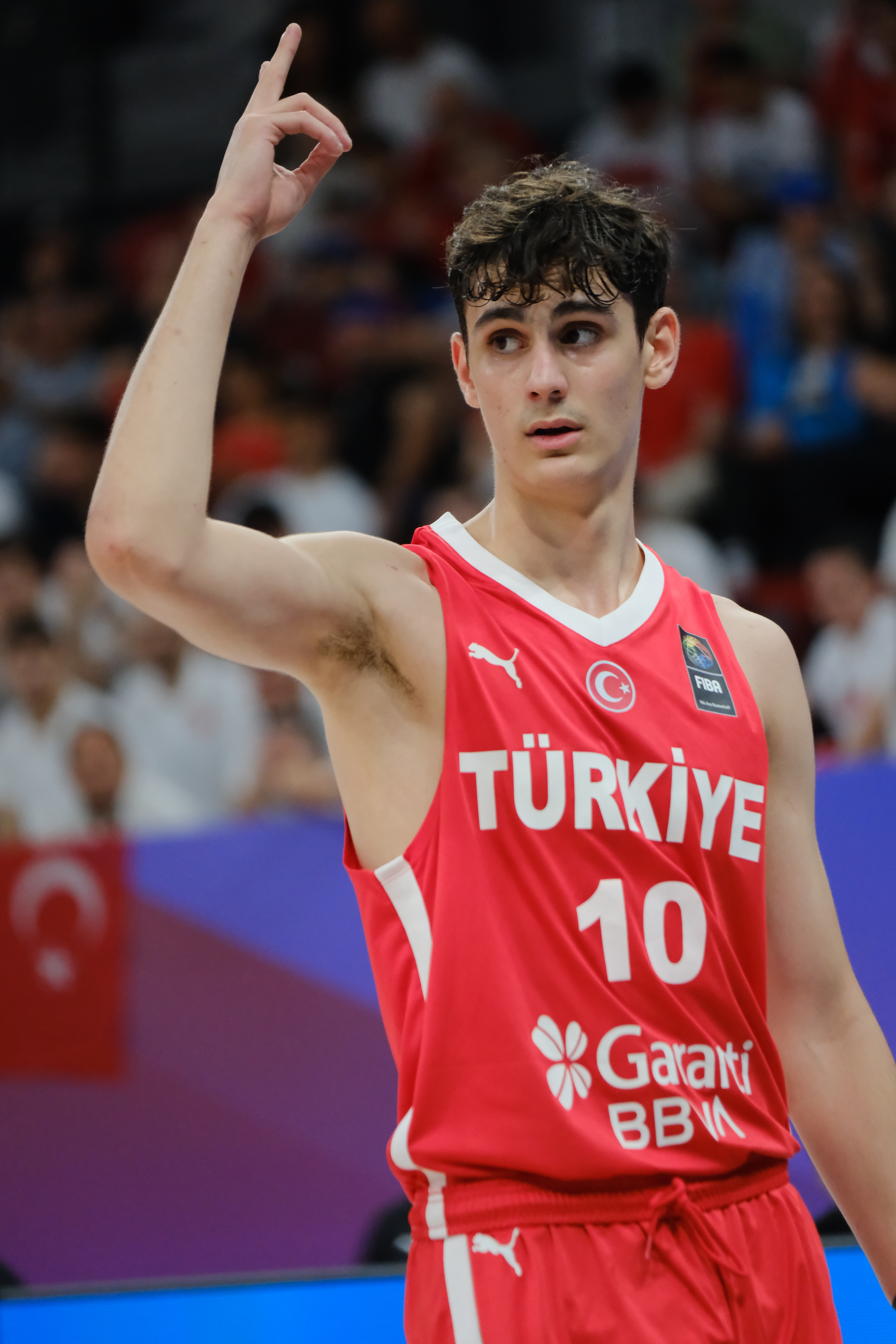
- Kutluay in 2026

No. 10 – Real Madrid B
- Position: Point guard

Personal information
- Born: 27 March 2009 (age 17) Istanbul, Turkey
- Listed height: 6 ft 4 in (1.93 m)

Career history
- 2025–present: Real Madrid B

Career highlights
- Liga U champion (2026)
Medals
Representing the Turkey
Men's basketball
European Youth Olympic Festival
Gold medal – first place	2025 North Macedonia	Team

Ömer Kutluay (born 27 March 2009) is a Turkish basketball player for Real Madrid B in the Liga U. He is the son of former player İbrahim Kutluay.

== Early life ==
Kutluay was born on 27 March 2009 in Istanbul, Turkey, to former basketball player İbrahim Kutluay and actress and former model Demet Şener. He began playing basketball at the age of five. Aside from growing up watching his father, Kutluay also grew up as a fan of Luka Dončić and Vasilije Micić. He trained under his father's guidance at the Ibrahim Kutluay Basketball Academy until the age of 13, when he moved to the Anadolu Efes youth setup. In 2023, Kutluay was the top scorer and MVP as he helped Anadolu Efes win the U14 national championship. He recorded 36 points, five rebounds, and five assists in the final.

In August 2023, Kutluay joined the youth academy of Real Madrid, which he chose over an offer from FC Barcelona. He helped the cadete (under-16) team win the 2025 Spanish National Championship, recording 10 points, four rebonds, and three assists in an 82–73 win over FC Barcelona. Kutluay was then assigned to club's reserve team for the inaugural season of the newly-created Spanish under-22 league, Liga U. He helped the team win the 2025–26 Liga U title after scoring 14 points in 12 minutes of an 86–82 win over FC Barcelona in the final.

== National team career ==
=== Junior teams ===
In 2023, Kutluay was called up to the Turkey national under-14 team for a FIBA Youth Development Fund tournament in Kosovo. He recorded 50 points, 17 rebounds, and five assists against the host team. Kutluay represented Turkey at 2024 FIBA U16 EuroBasket. He averaged a tournament-leading 19 points to go along with 4.8 rebounds and four assists per game, but was sidelined after suffering a toe injury. The following year, Kutluay helped Turkey win the gold medal at the 2025 European Youth Summer Olympic Festival, earning tournament MVP honors after leading all scorers with 27.6 points per game. He scored 29 points in a 91–75 win over France in the final. A few weeks later, Kuluay played at the 2025 FIBA U16 EuroBasket. He led the tournament in scoring with 24.1 points to go with six assists and four rebounds per game.

Kutluay represented Turkey at the 2026 FIBA Under-17 World Cup, held in his hometown of Istanbul. In their opening game, he posted 39 points, nine assists, and seven rebounds in a 112–100 double-overtime win over New Zealand, helping Turkey cap off a 25-points comeback. The following day, Kutluay recorded a near-triple-double, tallying 26 points, 10 assists, and nine rebounds in an 87–66 win over Slovenia. He then registered 32 points, 12 assists, and seven rebounds in a 98–77 win over Puerto Rico to close out group play, breaking the tournament record by making 17 free throws in a single game.

Kutluay helped Turkey beat France in the quarterfinals, leading a late comeback in the fourth quarter in front of their home crowd. He scored 30 points and dished out 11 assists in a 94–87 win. In the semifinals, Kutluay logged 25 points, eight assists, and seven rebounds in a 76–71 loss to Serbia. He then put up 32 points and seven rebounds in a 77–69 loss to Australia in the third-place game, thus missing out on a medal. Kutluay averaged 28.4 points and a tournament-leading nine assists per game. He subsequently earned All-Star Five.

=== Senior team ===
In June 2026, Ergin Ataman, head coach of the Turkey senior national team, stated at a press conference that he considered calling up Kutluay and Darius Karutasu for 2027 FIBA Basketball World Cup European qualifiers had the 2026 FIBA Under-17 World Cup not been taking place at the same time.
