= Latvia men's national under-16 basketball team =

Latvian youth sports team

Latvia
- FIBA zone: FIBA Europe
- National federation: Latvian Basketball Association

U17 World Cup
- Appearances: None

U16 EuroBasket
- Appearances: 23
- Medals: Gold: 1 (2026); Silver: 1 (2014)
Home	Away

The Latvia men's national under-16 basketball team is the national representative for Latvia in international under-16 basketball competitions. They are organized by the Latvian Basketball Association.

== FIBA U16 EuroBasket participations ==
Year	Result in Division A
1999	5th
2001	8th
2004	13th
2005	11th
2006	11th
2007	9th
2008	10th
2009	9th
2010	14th
2011	6th
2012	10th
2013	13th

Year	Result in Division A
2014	2nd place, silver medalist(s)
2015	11th
2016	11th
2017	8th
2018	8th
2019	13th
2022	10th
2023	11th
2024	7th
2025	6th
2026	1st place, gold medalist(s)

== See also ==
- Latvia men's national basketball team
- Latvia men's national under-20 basketball team
- Latvia men's national under-19 basketball team
- Latvia women's national under-17 basketball team
