= FC Barcelona Bàsquet B =

FC Barcelona's reserve basketball team

FC Barcelona B
- Leagues: Liga U
- Founded: 1997
- Arena: Ciutat Esportiva Joan Gamper
- Capacity: 472
- Location: Sant Joan Despí, Barcelona, Spain
- Team colors: Blue, Maroon, Yellow
- President: Joan Laporta
- Head coach: Álvaro Salinas
- Championships: 2 Liga EBA
- Website: fcbarcelona.com
Home	Away

FC Barcelona Bàsquet B (English: FC Barcelona Basketball B), commonly referred to as FC Barcelona B (Catalan pronunciation: [fubˈbɔl ˈklub bəɾsəˈlonə]) and colloquially known as Barça B ([ˈbaɾsə]) or Barça Atlètic, is the reserve team of the FC Barcelona. The team currently plays in the Liga U, a Spanish youth basketball competition.

== History ==
In 2003, Barcelona B won the amateur Spanish 4th-tier level Liga EBA, and thus got promoted to the LEB 2 division, but afterwards, they renounced their spot. After an agreement between FC Barcelona and CB Cornellà, for Cornellà to collaborate again as a reserve team of FC Barcelona; the 'B' team was folded by Barcelona, between 2005 and 2010. In 2010, FC Barcelona B was re-opened, and played in the LEB Plata division.

The team then played in the Spanish 2nd-tier level LEB Oro division, from 2012, when the team gained a vacant berth in the league, to 2014, when they were relegated down again to the LEB Plata division. In August 2015, the club gained a vacant berth back to the second division LEB Oro.

The team would move between the second and third tiers of Spanish basketball until the 2020-21 season. Despite achieving the 2nd place in the 2020-21 LEB Plata season and thus promotion to LEB Oro, Barcelona reached a deal with Força Lleida CE and CB Cornellà, switching licenses with these two clubs to be demoted to the 4th tier of Spanish basketball, Liga EBA. The club cited sporting and financial reasons to demote the team and has since focused on developing young players, consistently ranking in the top places of the Tercera FEB category. Since then, the team has renounced promotion to the former LEB Plata. Several young Barcelona B players have been called up to play for the first team since, such as Rafa Villar, Dame Sarr and Kasparas Jakučionis. In the summer of 2025, the team joined the newly created Liga U, a youth basketball competition for the Liga ACB teams.

== Players ==
=== Current roster ===
Note: Flags indicate national team eligibility at FIBA-sanctioned events. Players may hold other non-FIBA nationalities not displayed.

Barça B roster
Players
Coaches

Pos.	No.	Nat.	Name	Ht.	Age
SG	2	(Spain)	Montaner, Eric	1.81 m (5 ft 11 in)	17 – 26 January 2009
G	3	(Slovenia)	Siftar, Jakob	1.96 m (6 ft 5 in)	17 – 3 February 2009
G/F	8	(Georgia (country))	Pachulia, Saba		17 – 15 September 2009
SG	9	(Spain)	Puig, Arnau		16 – 24 February 2010
PG	11	(Spain)	Poza, Nil	1.75 m (5 ft 9 in)	17 – 16 February 2009
PG	12	(Spain)	Cruz, Pau	1.80 m (5 ft 11 in)	16 – 9 July 2010
PF	13	(Turkey)	Okur, Yigit Mehmet	2.03 m (6 ft 8 in)	16 – 19 February 2010
PF	17	(Spain)	Cerdán, Jan	2.05 m (6 ft 9 in)	16 – 22 March 2010
SG	23	(Spain)	Ferreras, Diego	1.93 m (6 ft 4 in)	17 – 13 August 2009
G	30	(Spain)	Filbà, Oriol	1.90 m (6 ft 3 in)	17 – 9 January 2009
C	34	(Mali)	Kone, Abdrahamane	2.08 m (6 ft 10 in)	17 – 2 January 2009
PF	60	(Burkina Faso)	Dabone, Mohamed	2.10 m (6 ft 11 in)	14 – 21 October 2011
F	77	(Mali)	Keita, Mohamed Namakan	2.02 m (6 ft 8 in)	18 – 22 June 2008

Head coach

- (Spain) Álvaro Salinas

Legend

- (C) Team captain
- Injured

- Roster
Updated: October 2, 2026

=== Depth chart ===
Pos.	Starting 5	Bench
C	Sayon Keita	Abdrahamane Kone
PF	Mohamed Keita	Mohamed Dabone
SF	Nikola Kusturica	Jakob Siftar
SG	Daniel González	Diego Ferreras
PG	Oriol Filbà	Nil Poza

Colours: Blue = homegrown player; Red = non-FIBA Europe player

== Notable players ==
Note: Flags indicate national team eligibility at FIBA-sanctioned events. Players may hold other non-FIBA nationalities not displayed.

Criteria

To appear in this section a player must have either:

- Set a club record or won an individual award while at the club
- Played at least one official international match for their national team at any time
- Played at least one official NBA match at any time.

- (Spain) Alfons Alzamora
- (Spain) Lluís Costa
- (Spain) Marc García
- (Spain) Marc Gasol
- (Spain) Pau Gasol
- (Spain) Sergi Martínez
- (Spain) Juan Carlos Navarro
- (Spain) Oriol Paulí
- (Spain) Víctor Sada
- (Spain) Jordi Trias
- (Spain) Eric Vila
- (Argentina) Leandro Bolmaro
- (Argentina) Juani Marcos
- (Bosnia and Herzegovina) Nedim Đedović
- (Bosnia and Herzegovina) Emir Sulejmanović
- (Croatia) Mario Hezonja
- (Croatia) Luka Šamanić
- (Czech Republic) Luboš Bartoň
- (Dominican Republic) Dagoberto Peña
- (Iceland) Kári Jónsson
- (Latvia) Rodions Kurucs
- (Lithuania) Kasparas Jakučionis
- (Lithuania) Arnas Velička
- (Senegal) Brancou Badio
- (Senegal) Ibou Badji
- (Slovenia) Jaka Lakovič
- (Sweden) Marcus Eriksson
- (Sweden) Ludvig Håkanson
- (Sweden) Nick Spires
- (Ukraine) Volodymyr Gerun
- (Uruguay) Agustín Ubal

== Season by season ==
Season	Tier	Division	Pos.	W–L	Cup competitions	
1997–98	3	Liga EBA	1st	20–6	Copa EBA	RU
1998–99	3	Liga EBA	4th	19–11		
1999–00	3	Liga EBA	6th	14–12		
2000–01	4	Liga EBA	4th	23–7		
2001–02	4	Liga EBA	5th	20–12		
2002–03	4	Liga EBA	3rd (Note: Resigned to promote to LEB 2.)	24–11		
2003–04	4	Liga EBA	4th	21–9		
2004–05	4	Liga EBA	9th	15–15		
2005–10	Did not enter any competition					
2010–11	3	LEB Plata	10th	11–17		
2011–12	3	LEB Plata	5th (Note: Achieved a vacant berth in LEB Oro.)	15–15		
2012–13	2	LEB Oro	10th	11–15		
2013–14	2	LEB Oro	13th	5–21		
2014–15	3	LEB Plata	13th	9–19		
2015–16	2	LEB Oro	12th	13–17		
2016–17	2	LEB Oro	14th	13–21		
2017–18	2	LEB Oro	12th	13–21		
2018–19	2	LEB Oro	17th	9–25		
2019–20	3	LEB Plata	7th (Note: Season curtailed due to the COVID-19 pandemic.)	14–11		
2020–21	3	LEB Plata	2nd (Note: Renounced playing the promotion playoff and achieved a deal to be demoted to Liga EBA.)	21–5	Copa LEB Plata	RU
2021–22	4	Liga EBA	1st (Note: Renounced playing the promotion playoff.)	21–1		
2022–23	4	Liga EBA	2nd	20–6		
2023–24	4	Liga EBA	1st	22–4		
2024–25	4	Tercera FEB	4th	18–8		
2025–26	–	Liga U	2nd	24–6	EuroLeague NextGen	C

== Trophies and awards ==
=== Trophies ===
- Liga EBA: (2)
  - 2003
  - 2022

=== Individual awards ===
LEB Oro Rising star

- Mario Hezonja – 2013
- Marc García – 2016
