= Centre Fédéral de Basket-ball =

CFBB
- Leagues: Nationale Masculine 1
- Arena: Complexe Nelson Paillou
- Capacity: 300
- Location: Paris, France
- Head coach: Lamine Kébé
- Ownership: FFBB
- Website: ffbb.com

Centre Fédéral de Basket-ball (transl. Federal Basketball Center), shortly CFBB, is a French basketball club, based in Paris. The club's squads are filled with players from the training institute INSEP. The first team of the club currently plays in the Nationale Masculine 1, the third tier level in France. The organisation is managed by the Fédération Française de Basket-Ball (FFBB), the national French basketball association.

== Notable players ==
Note: Flags indicate national team eligibility at FIBA-sanctioned events. Players may hold other non-FIBA nationalities not displayed.

Criteria

To appear in this section a player must have either:

- Set a club record or won an individual award while at the club
- Played at least one official international match for their national team at any time
- Played at least one official NBA match at any time.

- (France) Boris Diaw
- (France) Ousmane Dieng
- (France) Sekou Doumbouya
- (France) - (United States) Jaylen Hoard
- (France) Damien Inglis
- (France) Joffrey Lauvergne
- (France) Jérôme Moïso
- (France) Tony Parker
- (France) Johan Petro
- (France) Vincent Poirier
- (France) Stéphane Risacher
- (France) Ronny Turiaf
- (France) Victor Wembanyama
