= Liga U =

Spanish youth basketball league

- Founded: 18 June 2025; 13 months ago
- First season: 2025–26
- Country: Spain
- Federation: Spanish Federation
- Confederation: FIBA Europe
- Feeder to: Liga ACB

The Liga U is a Spanish basketball league for players under the age of 22 that is managed jointly by the Asociación de Clubs de Baloncesto (ACB) and the Spanish Basketball Federation (FEB). The league was created to provide opportunities for younger players who fail to play regular minutes in the Liga ACB, while also allowing the athletes to continue their academic higher education.

== History ==
=== Background ===
Throughout the decades, exploring a college career in the United States has been a consistent option for young basketball players who were not entirely sure to get a future in the European professional leagues.This allowed them to pursue higher education while continuing their sports career, a combination that has historically been less prevalent in Spain. With a scholarship, having a fully paid schooling was an opportunity to secure a long-term future while the short and medium-term prospects, with the ball in their hands, were uncertain. However, given the historically amateur nature of the NCAA, it was practically a ruled out option, except in rare cases for well outstanding talents capable of generating a level of income from a very young age, that would make academic development a secondary priority.

"In recent years, the migration of young European players to foreign leagues has increased. The introduction of the NIL program in the NCAA changed the traditional structure, affecting youth recruitment for European clubs. Spanish powerhouses like Real Madrid and FC Barcelona considered the option to eliminate their youth teams after this drain.

It emerged in response to the economic growth in college basketball in the NCAA due to student athlete compensation. It is supported by the Spanish Sports Council (CSD) and the Ministry of Education which will fund the tournament with a €15 million public investment during its first three seasons

=== Creation ===
In May 2025, Spanish Sports Council (CSD) alongside the Asociación de Clubs de Baloncesto (ACB) and the Spanish Basketball Federation (FEB) began negotiations to launch a tournament of reserve teams. On June 18, 2025, CSD, ACB and FEB announced the creation of a under-22 basketball league designed to keep emerging players with the aim to close the gap between youth and professional basketball, acting as an alternative to retain emerging players who intend to move to North American collegiate or professional leagues.

== Format ==
The competition is scheduled to debut in October 2025 and will be open to the 18 ACB teams for the 2025–26 season. Matches are scheduled to be played on Fridays and Saturdays to combine the league with ACB matches. The competition system is yet to be determined, depending on the number of participants, although three models are currently planned: for a League of 14, 16, or 18 teams.

== Players ==
=== Eligibility ===
Each team will be required to have a minimum of six Spanish players under the age of 22 during the first two seasons, which will be increase to seven players starting in the 2027–28 season.

== Champions ==
Season	Champion	Runner-up	Final	Final 6 MVP	Final 6 Venue
2025–26	Real Madrid	Barça	86–82	(Spain) Hugo Alonso	Polideportivo El Plantío, Burgos
