= Wilhelm Schmidt von der Launitz =

Imperial Russian Army general (1802-1864)

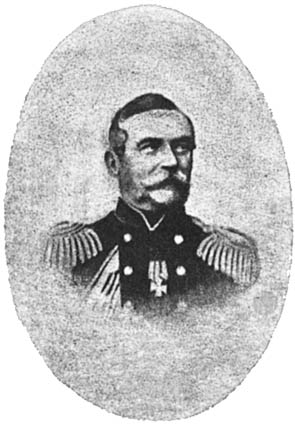
- General of the Cavalry Wilhelm Schmidt von der Launitz

Commander of the Kharkov Military District
- In office 10 August [O.S. 29 July] 1864 – 26 October [O.S. 14] 1864
- Monarch: Alexander II
- Preceded by: Position established
- Succeeded by: Sigizmund Merkhilevich

Personal details
- Born: Georg Wilhelm Eduard Launitz; 9 August [O.S. 28 July] 1802 Grobin, Grobin County, Courland Governorate, Russian Empire (present-day Grobiņa, Grobiņa Municipality, Latvia)
- Died: 26 October [O.S. 14] 1864 (aged 62) Kharkov, Kiev Governorate, Russian Empire (present-day Kharkiv, Ukraine)
- Spouse: Mathilde Luise Henriette von Budberg
- Children: 5 children

Military service
- Allegiance: Russian Empire
- Branch/service: Imperial Russian Army
- Years of service: 1819–1864
- Rank: General of the Cavalry
- Commands: 10th Odessa Lancers Regiment; Separate Corps of the Internal Guards; Kharkov Military District (August–October 1864)
- Battles/wars: November Uprising; Hungarian Revolution of 1848

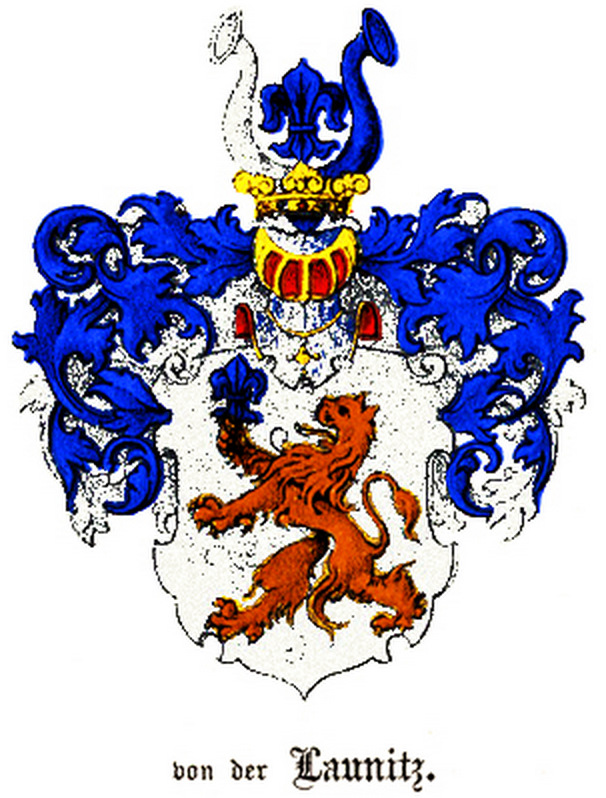
Coat of arms of the Launitz family (ru) in the Baltic coat of arms book (et) by Carl Arvid von Klingspor (sv) in 1882.

Georg Wilhelm "William" Eduard Schmidt von der Launitz (Born Launitz; Russian: Васи́лий Фёдорович Лауниц, tr. Vasíliy Fyodorovich Launits; 1802 – 26 October [O.S. 14] 1864) was a Baltic German general in the service of the Imperial Russian Army. Launitz was noted for being a strict and disciplined commander, and thanks to his effort, many of his troops’ living conditions were improved. Launitz also served as the first commander of the Kharkov Military District from August 1864 before dying from falling of his horse in October of the same year.

== Biography ==
=== Origin ===
Georg Wilhelm Eduard von der Launitz was born on 9 August [O.S. 28 July] 1802 into the family of Christian Friedrich Launitz, a pastor in Grobin, and Dorothea Elizabeth Kolb, he was the brother of the sculptor Robert and nephew to another famous sculptor Eduard Schmidt von der Launitz. Little was known about the Launitz family’s (ru) history, the only known history was that first ever known ancestor was Jürgen Launitz, all what was known about him was that he was a landowner in Courland in the 16th Century. The commoner family was recognized with Holy Roman nobility in 1802, but it was not until 1817 then the family adopted the title Schmidt von der Launitz.

=== Family ===
In 1842, Launitz married Baroness Mathilde Luise Henriette von Budberg, they had 5 children including Michael, who was a hussar like his father. All of his children were baptized in Lutheran churches, although Michael soon came under the influence of his Russian Orthodox wife and converted to Orthodoxy.

== Honours and awards ==
- Order of St. Vladimir, 4th class (1829)
- Order of St. George, 4th class (11.12.1840)
- Golden Weapon with the inscription "For Bravery" (1831)
- Order of St. Stanislaus, 1st class
- Order of St. Anna, 1st class
- Order of St. Vladimir, 2nd class
- Order of the White Eagle

== Notes ==
=== Sources ===
- Welding, Olaf. Baltic German Biographical Dictionary 1710-1960. (1970), from the Baltic Biographical Dictionary Digital
