= 2014 FIBA Europe Under-16 Championship =

International basketball competition

2014 EuroBasket Under-16
28th FIBA Europe Under-16 Championship

Tournament details
- Host country: Latvia
- Dates: 20 – 30 August 2014
- Teams: 16
- Venue(s): 4 (in 4 host cities)

Final positions
- Champions: France (2nd title)

Tournament statistics
- MVP: (France) Killian Tillie
- Top scorer: (Bosnia and Herzegovina) Musa (23.0)
- Top rebounds: (Lithuania) Gadiliauskas (9.7)
- Top assists: (Turkey) Al (6.7)
- PPG (Team): France (78.3)
- RPG (Team): Croatia (46.2)
- APG (Team): Turkey (17.6)

Official website
- http://u16men.fibaeurope.com/en/

The 2014 FIBA Europe Under-16 Championship was the 28th edition of the European Under-16 Basketball Championship. 16 teams participated in the competition, held in the four Latvian cities of Ogre, Grobiņa, Liepāja and Riga, from 20 to 30 August 2014. Spain were the defending champions.

== Participating teams ==
- Bosnia and Herzegovina ▲ (Runners-up, 2013 FIBA Europe Under-16 Championship Division B)
- Croatia
- Denmark ▲ (Winners, 2013 FIBA Europe Under-16 Championship Division B)
- Finland ▲ (3rd place, 2013 FIBA Europe Under-16 Championship Division B)
- France
- Germany
- Greece
- Italy
- Latvia
- Lithuania
- Poland
- Russia
- Serbia
- Spain
- Turkey
- Ukraine

== First round ==
The first-round groups draw took place on 1 December 2013 in Freising, Germany. In this round, sixteen teams are allocated in four groups of four teams each. The top three teams of each group will advance to the Second Round. The last teams will play in the Classification Group G first, then in the 9th – 16th place playoffs.

Team advances to the Second Round
Team will compete in the Classification Group G

=== Group A ===
Team	Pld	W	L	PF	PA	PD	Pts
Serbia	3	3	0	244	191	+53	6
Turkey	3	2	1	213	196	+17	5
Lithuania	3	1	2	224	232	−8	4
Finland	3	0	3	174	236	−62	3

20 August 2014
13:15

Serbia	79–55	Finland
Scoring by quarter: 8–8, 29–18, 31–14, 11–15
Pts: Boriša Simanić 15; Rebs: Matija Radovic 6 Asts: Bojan Nesic 7		Pts: Edon Maxhuni 20; Rebs: Vili Nyman 6 Asts: Vili Nyman 3

Secondary School Arena, Ogre
Attendance: 40
Referees: Jean-Charles Collin (FRA), Alexey Chudin (RUS), Jong Kuk Kim (KOR)

20 August 2014
20:15

Turkey	76–68	Lithuania
Scoring by quarter: 27–23, 15–17, 13–18, 21–10
Pts: Ömer Yurtseven 18; Rebs: Onuralp Bitim 8 Asts: Ömer Al 7		Pts: Tadas Sedekerskis 35; Rebs: Rokas Gadiliauskas 15; Asts: Eimantas Stankevicius 4

Secondary School Arena, Ogre
Attendance: 60
Referees: Sasa Pukl (SLO), Sergiy Chebyshev (UKR), Christoph Rohacky (AUT)

21 August 2014
15:45

Finland	61–74	Turkey
Scoring by quarter: 11–18, 11–17, 19–23, 20–16
Pts: Edon Maxhuni 20; Rebs: Eero Innamaa 7 Asts: Severi Kaukiainen 5		Pts: Ömer Yurtseven 14, Mehmet Özden 14; Rebs: Ömer Yurtseven 12; Asts: Onuralp Bitim 3, Ömer Al 3

Secondary School Arena, Ogre
Attendance: 40
Referees: Carmelo Paternico (ITA), David Romano (ISR), Jong Kuk Kim (KOR)

21 August 2014
20:15

Lithuania	73–98	Serbia
Scoring by quarter: 25–36, 16–18, 15–23, 17–21
Pts: Arnoldas Kulboka 16; Rebs: Rokas Gadiliauskas 10; Asts: Tadas Sedekerskis 6		Pts: Novak Music 22; Rebs: Nemanja Dincic 9 Asts: Aleksandar Aranitovic 5

Secondary School Arena, Ogre
Attendance: 80
Referees: Carlos Peruga (ESP), Sergey Mikhaylov (RUS), Bo Bundgaard (DEN)

22 August 2014
15:45

Finland	58–83	Lithuania
Scoring by quarter: 19–13, 11–29, 15–19, 13–22
Pts: Edon Maxhuni 9 Rebs: Vili Nyman 8 Asts: Edon Maxhuni 7		Pts: Tadas Sedekerskis 26; Rebs: 3 players tied with 11; Asts: Eimantas Stankevicius 4

Secondary School Arena, Ogre
Attendance: 70
Referees: Jean-Charles Collin (FRA), Christoph Rohacky (AUT), Alexey Chudin (RUS)

22 August 2014
20:15

Turkey	63–67	Serbia
Scoring by quarter: 9–18, 19–23, 15–10, 20–16
Pts: Oguzhan Yarol 12; Rebs: Ahmet Duran 7 Asts: Ömer Al 3		Pts: Aleksandar Aranitović 26; Rebs: Aleksandar Aranitović 6 Asts: Novak Music 4

Secondary School Arena, Ogre
Attendance: 60
Referees: Sasa Pukl (SLO), Sergiy Chebyshev (UKR), Wojciech Liszka (POL)

=== Group B ===
Team	Pld	W	L	PF	PA	PD	Pts
Latvia	3	3	0	221	184	+37	6
Bosnia and Herzegovina	3	2	1	176	178	−2	5
Croatia	3	1	2	182	200	−18	4
Greece	3	0	3	169	186	−17	3

20 August 2014
15:30

Report

Croatia	64–65	Bosnia and Herzegovina
Scoring by quarter: 15–21, 16–19, 20–8, 13–17
Pts: M. Kalajzić 19; Rebs: 4 players tied with 7 Asts: M. Kalajzić 4		Pts: Dž. Musa 18; Rebs: N. Sikiraš 8 Asts: A. Gegić 6

Secondary School Arena, Ogre
Attendance: 80
Referees: Carlos Peruga (ESP), David Romano (ISR), Bo Bundgaard (DEN)

20 August 2014
18:00

Greece	67–74	Latvia
Scoring by quarter: 14–16, 21–19, 19–23, 13–16
Pts: Vasileos Christidis 13; Rebs: Vasileos Christidis 7 Asts: Andreas Anastasios Skoufis 5		Pts: Rodions Kurucs 22; Rebs: Roberts Blumbergs 12, Arturs Strautins 12; Asts: Kristers Zoriks 3

Secondary School Arena, Ogre
Attendance: 300
Referees: Carmelo Paternico (ITA), Sergey Mikhaylov (RUS), Wojciech Liszka (POL)

21 August 2014
13:30

Report

Bosnia and Herzegovina	56–51	Greece
Scoring by quarter: 20–13, 5–18, 18–8, 13–12
Pts: Dž. Musa 21; Rebs: A. Gegić 13; Asts: L. Labus 5		Pts: G. Tarlas 10; Rebs: V. Christidis 11; Asts: A. Skoufis 4

Secondary School Arena, Ogre
Attendance: 20
Referees: Sasa Pukl (SLO), Sergiy Chebyshev (UKR), Christoph Rohacky (AUT)

21 August 2014
18:00

Latvia	84–62	Croatia
Scoring by quarter: 24–14, 25–14, 17–14, 18–20
Pts: Rodions Kurucs 16; Rebs: Niks Jansons 7 Asts: 3 players tied with 2		Pts: Mate Kalajzic 10; Rebs: Vuk Lazic 7 Asts: Mate Kalajzic 6

Secondary School Arena, Ogre
Attendance: 300
Referees: Jean-Charles Collin (FRA), Alexey Chudin (RUS), Wojciech Liszka (POL)

22 August 2014
13:30

Greece	51–56	Croatia
Scoring by quarter: 12–8, 17–22, 13–13, 9–13
Pts: Dimitrios Rafail Moraitis 13; Rebs: Vasileos Christidis 18; Asts: Andreas Anastasios Skoufis 4		Pts: Luka Kotrulja 19; Rebs: Karlo Uljarevic 8 Asts: Vuk Lazic 6

Secondary School Arena, Ogre
Attendance: 50
Referees: David Romano (ISR), Carlos Peruga (ESP), Jong Kuk Kim (KOR)

22 August 2014
18:00

Bosnia and Herzegovina	55–63	Latvia
Scoring by quarter: 12–13, 16–19, 12–17, 15–14
Pts: Dž. Musa 20; Rebs: Dž. Musa 12; Asts: Dž. Musa 4		Pts: R. Kurucs, A. Strautins 13; Rebs: R. Blumbergs 11; Asts: A. Strautins 6

Secondary School Arena, Ogre
Attendance: 320
Referees: Sergey Mikhaylov (RUS), Carmelo Paternico (ITA), Bo Bundgaard (DEN)

=== Group C ===
Team	Pld	W	L	PF	PA	PD	Pts
France	3	3	0	236	133	+103	6
Germany	3	2	1	216	178	+38	5
Poland	3	1	2	169	209	−40	4
Denmark	3	0	3	139	242	−103	3

20 August 2014
13:15

Germany	72–60	Poland
Scoring by quarter: 23–15, 16–16, 12–14, 21–15
Pts: Isaiah Hartenstein 15; Rebs: Isaiah Hartenstein 9 Asts: 4 players tied with 3		Pts: Mateusz Szczypinski 16, Dominik Rutkowski 16; Rebs: Bartlomiej Pietras 9 Asts: Dominik Rutkowski 5

Grobiņa Sport Hall, Grobiņa
Attendance: 200
Referees: Arnis Ozols (LAT), Luka Kardum (CRO), Yury Ihnatsyeu (BLR)

20 August 2014
15:30

France	87–33	Denmark
Scoring by quarter: 27–11, 17–11, 28–3, 15–8
Pts: Bathiste Tchouaffe 16; Rebs: Bathiste Tchouaffe 10; Asts: Timothé Vergiat 4		Pts: Nikolaj Bank 6 Rebs: Sylvester Berg 14; Asts: Oscar Lauritsen 2

Grobiņa Sport Hall, Grobiņa
Attendance: 200
Referees: Sérgio Silva (POR), Vilius Maciulaitis (LTU), David Berishvili (GEO)

21 August 2014
13:30

Denmark	48–87	Germany
Scoring by quarter: 12–22, 13–20, 8–24, 15–21
Pts: Sylvester Berg 20; Rebs: Sylvester Berg 5 Asts: Martin Poulsen 2, Oscar Lauritsen 2		Pts: Moritz Sanders 21; Rebs: Louis Olinde 10; Asts: Bennet Hundt 3, Isaiah Hartenstein 3

Grobiņa Sport Hall, Grobiņa
Attendance: 100
Referees: Luis Lopes (POR), Yener Yilmaz (TUR), Ernad Karovic (BIH)

21 August 2014
15:45

Poland	41–79	France
Scoring by quarter: 12–23, 8–12, 8–28, 13–16
Pts: Daniel Golebiowski 6 Rebs: 4 players tied with 3 Asts: 4 players tied with 1		Pts: Bathiste Tchouaffe 15; Rebs: Killian Tillie 9 Asts: 6 players tied with 2

Grobiņa Sport Hall, Grobiņa
Attendance: 200
Referees: Marko Juras (SRB), Anastasios Manos (GRE), Riannan Louise De La Torre (AUS)

22 August 2014
13:30

Denmark	58–68	Poland
Scoring by quarter: 14–17, 16–17, 11–21, 17–13
Pts: Sylvester Berg 14; Rebs: Nikolaj Bank 12, Sylvester Berg 11; Asts: Asbjoern Nerlov 2		Pts: Mateusz Szczypinski 20; Rebs: Bartlomiej Pietras 9 Asts: Jakub Kobel 6

Grobiņa Sport Hall, Grobiņa
Attendance: 50
Referees: Luis Lopes (POR), Anastasios Manos (GRE), David Berishvili (GEO)

22 August 2014
18:00

Germany	59–70	France
Scoring by quarter: 25–22, 10–24, 14–12, 10–12
Pts: Kostja Mushidi 20; Rebs: Isaiah Hartenstein 10; Asts: Kostja Mushidi 4		Pts: Bathiste Tchouaffe 18; Rebs: Jules Rambaut 8, Killian Tillie 8 Asts: Frank Ntilikina 4

Grobiņa Sport Hall, Grobiņa
Attendance: 200
Referees: Sérgio Silva (POR), Yury Ihnatsyeu (BLR), Vilius Maciulaitis (LTU)

=== Group D ===
Team	Pld	W	L	PF	PA	PD	Pts
Italy	3	3	0	222	121	+101	6
Spain	3	1	2	201	193	+8	4
Russia	3	1	2	178	201	−23	4
Ukraine	3	1	2	141	227	−86	4

20 August 2014
18:00

Italy	66–41	Russia
Scoring by quarter: 10–4, 10–15, 27–9, 19–13
Pts: Davide Moretti 14; Rebs: Lorenzo Bucarelli 8 Asts: Davide Moretti 4		Pts: Daniil Trostin 10; Rebs: Kirill Popov 9 Asts: Agasiy Tonoyan 2

Grobiņa Sport Hall, Grobiņa
Attendance: 230
Referees: Luis Lopes (POR), Yener Yilmaz (TUR), Ernad Karovic (BIH)

20 August 2014
20:15

Spain	81–46	Ukraine
Scoring by quarter: 21–12, 15–15, 22–9, 23–10
Pts: Maxim Esteban 14; Rebs: Eric Martinez 10; Asts: Victor Moreno 4		Pts: Ihor Dubonenko 12; Rebs: Dmytro Skapintsev 8 Asts: Mykhailo Horobchenko 3

Grobiņa Sport Hall, Grobiņa
Attendance: 220
Referees: Marko Juras (SRB), Anastasios Manos (GRE), Riannan Louise De La Torre (AUS)

21 August 2014
18:00

Ukraine	27–85	Italy
Scoring by quarter: 8–21, 3–23, 11–23, 5–18
Pts: Illia Niemtsu 4, Mykyta Yarmaki 4 Rebs: Danyyil Ovcharenko 7 Asts: Ivan Dudar 3		Pts: Tommaso Oxilia 13; Rebs: Riccardo Visconti 9 Asts: Lorenzo Penna 4, Lorenzo Bucarelli 4

Grobiņa Sport Hall, Grobiņa
Attendance: 100
Referees: Arnis Ozols (LAT), Luka Kardum (CRO), Yury Ihnatsyeu (BLR)

21 August 2014
20:15

Russia	76–67	Spain
Scoring by quarter: 22–14, 16–14, 23–17, 15–22
Pts: Daniil Trostin 23; Rebs: Maxim Barashkov 13; Asts: 4 players tied with 2		Pts: Victor Moreno 18; Rebs: Manuel Vazquez 7 Asts: Alberto Maura 3

Grobiņa Sport Hall, Grobiņa
Attendance: 100
Referees: Sérgio Silva (POR), Vilius Maciulaitis (LTU), David Berishvili (GEO)

22 August 2014
15:45

Italy	71–53	Spain
Scoring by quarter: 22–15, 14–15, 17–13, 18–10
Pts: Davide Moretti 17; Rebs: Tommaso Oxilia 10; Asts: Davide Moretti 5		Pts: Victor Moreno 16; Rebs: Maxim Esteban 7, Manuel Vazquez 7 Asts: Pol Figueras 3

Grobiņa Sport Hall, Grobiņa
Attendance: 150
Referees: Marko Juras (SRB), Ernad Karovic (BIH), Riannan Louise De La Torre (AUS)

22 August 2014
20:15

Ukraine	68–61	Russia
Scoring by quarter: 19–15, 17–11, 13–17, 19–18
Pts: Ihor Dubonenko 18; Rebs: Danyyil Ovcharenko 11; Asts: 3 players tied with 2		Pts: Daniil Trostin 20; Rebs: Andrei Lopatin 7 Asts: Denis Velichkin 5

Grobiņa Sport Hall, Grobiņa
Attendance: 300
Referees: Arnis Ozols (LAT), Luka Kardum (CRO), Yener Yilmaz (TUR)

== Second round ==
Twelve advancing teams from the First Round will be allocated in two groups of six teams each. The top four teams of each group will advance to the quarterfinals. The last two teams of each group will play in the 9th – 16th place playoffs against the teams from the Group G.

Team advances to the Quarterfinals
Team will compete in the 9th – 16th place playoffs

=== Group E ===
Team	Pld	W	L	PF	PA	PD	Pts
Serbia	5	5	0	381	300	+81	10
Turkey	5	4	1	382	308	+74	9
Latvia	5	2	3	315	328	−13	7
Bosnia and Herzegovina	5	2	3	315	381	−66	7
Croatia	5	1	4	329	366	−37	6
Lithuania	5	1	4	364	403	−39	6

24 August 2014
15:45

Croatia	61–68	Serbia
Scoring by quarter: 17–22, 14–14, 21–17, 9–15
Pts: Kresimir Ljubicic 14; Rebs: Kresimir Ljubicic 9 Asts: Mate Kalajzic 5		Pts: Aleksandar Aranitović 16; Rebs: Aleksandar Aranitović 6 Asts: Aleksandar Aranitović 3

Secondary School Arena, Ogre
Attendance: 60
Referees: Bo Bundgaard (DEN), Carmelo Paternico (ITA), Sergey Mikhaylov (RUS)

24 August 2014
18:00

Bosnia and Herzegovina	54–85	Turkey
Scoring by quarter: 16–19, 12–16, 14–16, 12–34
Pts: Džanan Musa 17; Rebs: Džanan Musa, Amar Gegić 6 Asts: Džanan Musa 4		Pts: Oguzhan Yarol 24; Rebs: Oguzhan Yarol, Ömer Yurtseven 7 Asts: Ömer Al 7

Secondary School Arena, Ogre
Attendance: 40
Referees: Carlos Peruga (ESP), Luis Lopes (POR), Jean-Charles Collin (FRA)

24 August 2014
20:15

Lithuania	79–71	Latvia
Scoring by quarter: 16–18, 23–11, 21–24, 19–18
Pts: Tadas Sedekerskis 23; Rebs: Rokas Gadiliauskas 13; Asts: Tadas Sedekerskis 5, Eimantas Stankevicius 5		Pts: Rodions Kurucs 21; Rebs: Arturs Strautins 8 Asts: 3 players tied with 3

Secondary School Arena, Ogre
Attendance: 300
Referees: Sasa Pukl (SLO), Sergiy Chebyshev (UKR), Jong Kuk Kim (KOR)

25 August 2014
15:45

Serbia	89–52	Bosnia and Herzegovina
Scoring by quarter: 27–9, 23–15, 19–14, 20–14
Pts: Borisa Simanic 16, Novak Music 16; Rebs: Borisa Simanic 6 Asts: Bojan Nesic 6		Pts: Dzanan Musa 23; Rebs: Sabahudin Jahic 7 Asts: Amar Gegic 3

Secondary School Arena, Ogre
Attendance: 20
Referees: Sasa Pukl (SLO), Sergiy Chebyshev (UKR), Wojciech Liszka (POL)

25 August 2014
18:00

Croatia	69–64	Lithuania
Scoring by quarter: 15–13, 20–20, 15–22, 19–9
Pts: Kresimir Ljubicic 16, Luka Kotrulja 16; Rebs: Leo Cizmic 10, Kresimir Ljubicic 11; Asts: Mate Kalajzic 5		Pts: Arnoldas Kulboka 19; Rebs: Tadas Sedekerskis 13, Donatas Kupsas 11; Asts: Tadas Sedekerskis 7

Secondary School Arena, Ogre
Attendance: 60
Referees: Carlos Peruga (ESP), Alexey Chudin (RUS), Christoph Rohacky (AUT)

25 August 2014
20:15

Turkey	73–46	Latvia
Scoring by quarter: 22–6, 19–7, 16–17, 16–16
Pts: Ömer Yurtseven 20; Rebs: Ömer Yurtseven 10; Asts: Berk Kar 6, Ömer Al 6		Pts: Arturs Strautins 10; Rebs: Bogdans Railans 4 Asts: Reinis Rudzitis 2

Secondary School Arena, Ogre
Attendance: 300
Referees: Carmelo Paternico (ITA), Bo Bundgaard (DEN), David Romano (ISR)

26 August 2014
15:45

Bosnia and Herzegovina	89–80	Lithuania
Scoring by quarter: 23–27, 24–19, 17–18, 25–16
Pts: Dzanan Musa 37; Rebs: Amar Gegic 8 Asts: Amar Gegic 7		Pts: Tadas Sedekerskis 19; Rebs: Donatas Kupsas 12; Asts: Tadas Sedekerskis 5

Secondary School Arena, Ogre
Attendance: 40
Referees: Sergiy Chebyshev (UKR), Jean-Charles Collin (FRA), Bo Bundgaard (DEN)

26 August 2014
18:00

Turkey	85–73	Croatia
Scoring by quarter: 15–16, 21–22, 18–25, 31–10
Pts: Oguzhan Yarol 17; Rebs: Oguzhan Yarol 9 Asts: Ömer Al 12		Pts: Karlo Uljarevic 16; Rebs: Mateo Colak 9 Asts: Vuk Lazic 5

Secondary School Arena, Ogre
Attendance: 20
Referees: Sasa Pukl (SLO), Sergey Mikhaylov (RUS), Jong Kuk Kim (KOR)

26 August 2014
20:15

Latvia	51–59	Serbia
Scoring by quarter: 13–20, 12–9, 10–18, 16–12
Pts: Arturs Strautins 8, Rodions Kurucs 8 Rebs: Rodions Kurucs 8 Asts: Arturs Banga 3		Pts: Aleksandar Aranitović 15; Rebs: Nemanja Dincic 6 Asts: Aleksandar Aranitović 7

Secondary School Arena, Ogre
Attendance: 300
Referees: Luis Lopes (POR), Carlos Peruga (ESP), Christoph Rohacky (AUT)

=== Group F ===
Team	Pld	W	L	PF	PA	PD	Pts
France	5	5	0	380	262	+118	10
Germany	5	4	1	345	321	+24	9
Italy	5	3	2	351	300	+51	8
Spain	5	1	4	322	352	−30	6
Russia	5	1	4	295	368	−73	6
Poland	5	1	4	302	392	−90	6

24 August 2014
15:45

Spain	68–82	Germany
Scoring by quarter: 18–20, 13–14, 20–24, 17–24
Pts: Pol Figueras 25; Rebs: Eric Martinez 6 Asts: Pol Figueras 7		Pts: Kostja Mushidi 29; Rebs: Isaiah Hartenstein 15; Asts: Kostja Mushidi 4

Liepāja Olympic Center, Liepāja
Attendance: 300
Referees: Anastasios Manos (GRE), Luka Kardum (CRO), Yener Yilmaz (TUR)

24 August 2014
18:00

Russia	44–83	France
Scoring by quarter: 8–23, 13–18, 11–25, 12–17
Pts: Andrei Lopatin 11; Rebs: Sergey Klyuev 7, Nikita Vavilov 7 Asts: 3 players tied with 2		Pts: Frank Ntilikina 15; Rebs: Killian Tillie 8 Asts: Yves Pons 4

Liepāja Olympic Center, Liepāja
Attendance: 350
Referees: Marko Juras (SRB), Yury Ihnatsyeu (BLR), Riannan Louise De La Torre (AUS)

24 August 2014
20:15

Poland	59–85	Italy
Scoring by quarter: 8–26, 13–21, 16–20, 22–18
Pts: Dominik Rutkowski 16; Rebs: Marcin Wiszomirski 6 Asts: 3 players tied with 2		Pts: Lorenzo Penna 12; Rebs: Giordano Pagani 7 Asts: Lorenzo Bucarelli 5

Liepāja Olympic Center, Liepāja
Attendance: 50
Referees: Sérgio Silva (POR), Ernad Karovic (BIH), David Berishvili (GEO)

25 August 2014
15:45

France	69–56	Spain
Scoring by quarter: 13–10, 23–21, 16–5, 17–20
Pts: Killian Tillie 20; Rebs: Killian Tillie 11; Asts: Timothé Vergiat 3		Pts: Pol Figueras 10; Rebs: Eric Martinez 9 Asts: Pol Figueras 3

Liepāja Olympic Center, Liepāja
Attendance: 100
Referees: Ernad Karovic (BIH), Sérgio Silva (POR), David Berishvili (GEO)

25 August 2014
18:00

Russia	78–88	Poland
Scoring by quarter: 18–24, 20–13, 17–31, 23–20
Pts: Maxim Barashkov 18; Rebs: Andrei Lopatin 6 Asts: Daniil Trostin 3, Denis Velichkin 3		Pts: Dominik Rutkowski 21; Rebs: 3 players tied with 7 Asts: Dominik Rutkowski 6

Liepāja Olympic Center, Liepāja
Attendance: 500
Referees: Luka Kardum (CRO), Anastasios Manos (GRE), Yener Yilmaz (TUR)

25 August 2014
20:15

Germany	68–67	Italy
Scoring by quarter: 23–14, 19–13, 13–22, 13–18
Pts: Kostja Mushidi 21; Rebs: Isaiah Hartenstein 12, Kostja Mushidi 11; Asts: Kostja Mushidi 3, Isaiah Hartenstein 3		Pts: Davide Moretti 29; Rebs: Davide Moretti 4 Asts: Davide Moretti 4

Liepāja Olympic Center, Liepāja
Attendance: 250
Referees: Marko Juras (SRB), Yury Ihnatsyeu (BLR), Riannan Louise De La Torre (AUS)

26 August 2014
15:45

Italy	62–79	France
Scoring by quarter: 16–27, 18–15, 16–11, 12–26
Pts: Tommaso Oxilia 19; Rebs: Tommaso Oxilia 5 Asts: Lorenzo Bucarelli 7		Pts: Killian Tillie 20; Rebs: Killian Tillie 10; Asts: Jules Rambaut 4

Liepāja Olympic Center, Liepāja
Attendance: 200
Referees: Yener Yilmaz (TUR), Sérgio Silva (POR), Ernad Karovic (BIH)

26 August 2014
18:00

Germany	64–56	Russia
Scoring by quarter: 17–14, 12–17, 14–17, 21–8
Pts: Kostja Mushidi 16; Rebs: Isaiah Hartenstein 7 Asts: Lars Lagerpusch 3, Louis Olinde 3		Pts: Daniil Trostin 12; Rebs: Sergey Klyuev 9 Asts: Aleksei Volpianskii 3

Liepāja Olympic Center, Liepāja
Attendance: 250
Referees: Marko Juras (SRB), Anastasios Manos (GRE), David Berishvili (GEO)

26 August 2014
20:15

Spain	78–54	Poland
Scoring by quarter: 27–15, 13–7, 18–19, 20–13
Pts: Aleix Font 19; Rebs: Eric Martinez 11; Asts: Pol Figueras 4		Pts: Mateusz Szczypinski 13; Rebs: Dominik Rutkowski 6, Mateusz Szczypinski 6 Asts: Michal Jedrzejewski 2, Jakub Kobel 2

Liepāja Olympic Center, Liepāja
Attendance: 150
Referees: Yury Ihnatsyeu (BLR), Riannan Louise De La Torre (AUS), Luka Kardum (CRO)

== Classification Group G ==
The last team of each group of the First Round will compete in this Classification Round.

Team	Pld	W	L	PF	PA	PD	Pts
Finland	3	3	0	192	174	+18	6
Greece	3	2	1	220	184	+36	5
Ukraine	3	1	2	206	212	−6	4
Denmark	3	0	3	176	224	−48	3

24 August 2014
16:15

Finland	71–67	Ukraine
Scoring by quarter: 20–12, 12–21, 15–9, 24–25
Pts: Edon Maxhuni 22; Rebs: 3 players tied with 6 Asts: Edon Maxhuni 7		Pts: Danyyil Ovcharenko 16; Rebs: Danyyil Ovcharenko 8 Asts: Ivan Dudar 5

Riga Olympic Centre, Riga
Attendance: 20
Referees: David Romano (ISR), Wojciech Liszka (POL), Vilius Maciulaitis (LTU)

24 August 2014
18:30

Greece	93–55	Denmark
Scoring by quarter: 24–14, 18–6, 23–16, 28–19
Pts: Vasileos Christidis 15; Rebs: Dionysios Tataris 7 Asts: Andreas Anastasios Skoufis 7		Pts: Sylvester Berg 16; Rebs: Sylvester Berg 11; Asts: 3 players tied with 2

Riga Olympic Centre, Riga
Attendance: 30
Referees: Arnis Ozols (LAT), Alexey Chudin (RUS), Christoph Rohacky (AUT)

25 August 2014
16:15

Denmark	61–69	Finland
Scoring by quarter: 14–16, 24–22, 16–12, 7–19
Pts: Lukas Speidel 15; Rebs: Sylvester Berg 7, Martin Poulsen 7 Asts: Martin Poulsen 6		Pts: Vili Nyman 22; Rebs: Vili Nyman 10; Asts: Vili Nyman 4

Riga Olympic Centre, Riga
Attendance: 50
Referees: Jean-Charles Collin (FRA), Vilius Maciulaitis (LTU), Jong Kuk Kim (KOR)

25 August 2014
18:30

Ukraine	77–81 (OT)	Greece
Scoring by quarter: 13–16, 24–22, 19–11, 14–21, Overtime: 7–11
Pts: Ihor Dubonenko 19; Rebs: Dmytro Skapintsev 10; Asts: Vladyslav Los 4		Pts: Dimitrios Chatzikyriakidis 14; Rebs: Vasileos Christidis 10; Asts: Diogenis Gorgonis 6

Riga Olympic Centre, Riga
Attendance: 50
Referees: Arnis Ozols (LAT), Luis Lopes (POR), Sergey Mikhaylov (RUS)

26 August 2014
16:15

Finland	52–46	Greece
Scoring by quarter: 7–12, 16–9, 9–13, 20–12
Pts: Edon Maxhuni 15; Rebs: Elias Valtonen 9 Asts: Edon Maxhuni 3, Severi Kaukiainen 3		Pts: Vasileos Christidis 16; Rebs: Vasileos Christidis 10; Asts: 3 players tied with 3

Riga Olympic Centre, Riga
Attendance: 50
Referees: Carmelo Paternico (ITA), Vilius Maciulaitis (LTU), Wojciech Liszka (POL)

26 August 2014
18:30

Denmark	60–62	Ukraine
Scoring by quarter: 10–20, 22–21, 14–8, 14–13
Pts: Sylvester Berg 22; Rebs: Sylvester Berg 14; Asts: Sylvester Berg 4		Pts: Ihor Dubonenko 19; Rebs: Dmytro Skapintsev 14; Asts: Ivan Dudar 3

Riga Olympic Centre, Riga
Attendance: 50
Referees: Arnis Ozols (LAT), David Romano (ISR), Alexey Chudin (RUS)

== 9th – 16th place playoffs ==
13th place match
G1	Finland	66
G3	Ukraine	61
15th place match
G4	Denmark	54
F6	Poland	69

13th – 16th place playoffs
G4	Denmark	53
G1	Finland	62
G3	Ukraine	62
F6	Poland	56

9th – 16th place playoffs
E6	Lithuania	88
G4	Denmark	62
F5	Russia	72
G1	Finland	61
E5	Croatia	75
G3	Ukraine	49
F6	Poland	42
G2	Greece	66

9th – 12th place playoffs
E6	Lithuania	78
F5	Russia	66
E5	Croatia	60
G2	Greece	64

9th place match
E6	Lithuania	68
G2	Greece	77
11th place match
F5	Russia	64
E5	Croatia	69

28 August 2014
13:30

Lithuania	88–62	Denmark
Scoring by quarter: 30–19, 14–7, 22–21, 22–15
Pts: Tadas Sedekerskis 24; Rebs: Tadas Sedekerskis 7 Asts: Tadas Sedekerskis 4		Pts: Asbjoern Nerlov 15; Rebs: Nikolaj Bank 8 Asts: Martin Poulsen 3

Riga Olympic Centre II, Riga
Attendance: 30
Referees: Ernad Karovic (BIH), Riannan Louise De La Torre (AUS), Jong Kuk Kim (KOR)

28 August 2014
15:45

Russia	72–61	Finland
Scoring by quarter: 14–12, 19–15, 20–15, 19–19
Pts: Daniil Trostin 15; Rebs: Sergey Klyuev 10; Asts: Daniil Trostin 5		Pts: Eero Innamaa 14; Rebs: Elias Valtonen 11; Asts: Edon Maxhuni 5

Riga Olympic Centre II, Riga
Attendance: 50
Referees: Arnis Ozols (LAT), Sérgio Silva (POR), Yury Ihnatsyeu (BLR)

28 August 2014
18:00

Poland	42–66	Greece
Scoring by quarter: 11–17, 8–18, 11–19, 12–12
Pts: Dominik Rutkowski 9, Daniel Golebiowski 9 Rebs: Dominik Rutkowski 5, Mateusz Szczypinski 5 Asts: Mateusz Szczypinski 3, Jakub Kobel 3		Pts: Vasileos Christidis 18; Rebs: 3 players tied with 10; Asts: Dimitrios Rafail Moraitis 4

Riga Olympic Centre II, Riga
Attendance: 20
Referees: David Romano (ISR), Luis Lopes (POR), David Berishvili (GEO)

28 August 2014
20:15

Croatia	75–49	Ukraine
Scoring by quarter: 25–15, 20–13, 13–13, 17–16
Pts: 3 players tied with 11; Rebs: Mateo Colak 9 Asts: Mate Kalajzic 4		Pts: Ihor Dubonenko 9, Mykhailo Horobchenko 9 Rebs: Danyyil Ovcharenko 6 Asts: Ivan Dudar 2, Oleksii Melnyk 2

Riga Olympic Centre II, Riga
Attendance: 15
Referees: Jean-Charles Collin (FRA), Yener Yilmaz (TUR), Christoph Rohacky (AUT)

=== 13th – 16th place playoffs ===
29 August 2014
13:30

Denmark	53–62	Finland
Scoring by quarter: 15–21, 13–18, 12–12, 13–11
Pts: Asbjoern Nerlov 16; Rebs: Sylvester Berg 9 Asts: Sylvester Berg 3, David Kristensen 3		Pts: Hannes Pöllä 15; Rebs: Eero Innamaa 7, Hannes Pöllä 7 Asts: Vili Nyman 4

Riga Olympic Centre II, Riga
Attendance: 30
Referees: Anastasios Manos (GRE), David Romano (ISR), David Berishvili (GEO)

29 August 2014
15:45

Ukraine	62–56	Poland
Scoring by quarter: 15–17, 21–15, 12–17, 14–7
Pts: Dmytro Skapintsev 22; Rebs: Dmytro Skapintsev 15; Asts: 4 players tied with 2		Pts: Marcin Wiszomirski 19; Rebs: Dominik Rutkowski 7, Mateusz Szczypinski 7 Asts: Michal Jedrzejewski 9

Riga Olympic Centre II, Riga
Attendance: 50
Referees: Arnis Ozols (LAT), Riannan Louise De La Torre (AUS), Alexey Chudin (RUS)

=== 9th – 12th place playoffs ===
29 August 2014
18:00

Lithuania	78–66	Russia
Scoring by quarter: 23–21, 10–15, 26–12, 19–18
Pts: Tadas Sedekerskis 27; Rebs: Tadas Sedekerskis 10; Asts: Eimantas Stankevicius 4, Tadas Sedekerskis 4		Pts: Maxim Barashkov 31; Rebs: Andrei Lopatin 7 Asts: Denis Velichkin 5

Riga Olympic Centre II, Riga
Attendance: 60
Referees: Sasa Pukl (SLO), Luka Kardum (CRO), Bo Bundgaard (DEN)

29 August 2014
20:15

Croatia	60–64	Greece
Scoring by quarter: 21–10, 7–20, 12–15, 20–19
Pts: Kresimir Ljubicic 14; Rebs: Mateo Colak 12; Asts: Vuk Lazic 5		Pts: Vasileos Christidis 20; Rebs: Dimitrios Rafail Moraitis 6 Asts: Dimitrios Rafail Moraitis 7

Riga Olympic Centre II, Riga
Attendance: 20
Referees: Sergey Mikhaylov (RUS), Vilius Maciulaitis (LTU), Wojciech Liszka (POL)

== Championship playoffs ==
Fifth place
E1	Serbia	66
F3	Italy	72
Seventh place
F2	Germany	110
E4	Bosnia and Herzegovina	69

Consolation semifinals
E1	Serbia	73
F2	Germany	68
E4	Bosnia and Herzegovina	66
F3	Italy	86

Quarterfinals
E1	Serbia	64
F4	Spain	78
F2	Germany	39
E3	Latvia	53
F1	France	82
E4	Bosnia and Herzegovina	52
E2	Turkey	82
F3	Italy	73

Semifinals
F4	Spain	71
E3	Latvia	81
F1	France	78
E2	Turkey	65

Final
E3	Latvia	53
F1	France	78
Third place
F4	Spain	77
E2	Turkey	73

== Quarterfinals ==
28 August 2014
13:30

Turkey	82–73	Italy
Scoring by quarter: 19–15, 23–8, 17–30, 23–20
Pts: Ömer Yurtseven 25; Rebs: Ömer Yurtseven 14; Asts: Ömer Al 6		Pts: Lorenzo Bucarelli 15; Rebs: Tommaso Oxilia 8 Asts: Lorenzo Penna 5

Riga Olympic Centre, Riga
Attendance: 200
Referees: Carlos Peruga (ESP), Sergiy Chebyshev (UKR), Wojciech Liszka (POL)

28 August 2014
15:45

France	82–52	Bosnia and Herzegovina
Scoring by quarter: 19–23, 24–12, 15–9, 24–8
Pts: Quentin Goulmy 20; Rebs: Hugo Blanc 13, Quentin Goulmy 11; Asts: Abdoulaye N'Doye 5		Pts: Amar Gegic 19; Rebs: Njegos Sikiras 6 Asts: Amar Gegic 5

Riga Olympic Centre, Riga
Attendance: 200
Referees: Marko Juras (SRB), Anastasios Manos (GRE), Alexey Chudin (RUS)

28 August 2014
18:00

Serbia	64–78	Spain
Scoring by quarter: 10–21, 27–10, 9–29, 18–18
Pts: Aleksandar Aranitovic 32; Rebs: Aleksandar Aranitovic 13; Asts: Aleksandar Aranitovic 4		Pts: Pol Figueras 17; Rebs: Francisco Salvador 16; Asts: Pol Figueras 9

Riga Olympic Centre, Riga
Attendance: 100
Referees: Carmelo Paternico (ITA), Luka Kardum (CRO), Vilius Maciulaitis (LTU)

28 August 2014
20:15

Germany	39–53	Latvia
Scoring by quarter: 11–11, 11–15, 4–17, 13–10
Pts: Kostja Mushidi 8 Rebs: Isaiah Hartenstein 10; Asts: Kostja Mushidi 3		Pts: Arturs Strautins 11; Rebs: Karlis Garoza 10, Rodions Kurucs 12; Asts: Kristers Zoriks 6

Riga Olympic Centre, Riga
Attendance: 800
Referees: Sasa Pukl (SLO), Sergey Mikhaylov (RUS), Bo Bundgaard (DEN)

=== 5th – 8th place playoffs ===
29 August 2014
13:30

Bosnia and Herzegovina	66–86	Italy
Scoring by quarter: 17–25, 21–24, 13–17, 15–20
Pts: Dzanan Musa 32; Rebs: Dzanan Musa 7 Asts: Dzanan Musa 4		Pts: Tommaso Oxilia 23; Rebs: Tommaso Oxilia 8 Asts: Tommaso Baldasso 4, Tommaso Oxilia 4

Riga Olympic Centre, Riga
Attendance: 100
Referees: Luis Lopes (POR), Yury Ihnatsyeu (BLR), Jong Kuk Kim (KOR)

29 August 2014
15:45

Serbia	73–68	Germany
Scoring by quarter: 20–21, 13–17, 21–17, 19–13
Pts: Borisa Simanic 27; Rebs: Borisa Simanic 7 Asts: Bojan Nesic 6		Pts: Lars Lagerpusch 17; Rebs: Isaiah Hartenstein 6 Asts: Kostja Mushidi 6

Riga Olympic Centre, Riga
Attendance: 150
Referees: Jean-Charles Collin (FRA), Sergiy Chebyshev (UKR), Christoph Rohacky (AUT)

== Semifinals ==
29 August 2014
18:00

France	78–65	Turkey
Scoring by quarter: 24–14, 19–15, 25–18, 10–18
Pts: Bathiste Tchouaffe 18; Rebs: Killian Tillie 17; Asts: Frank Ntilikina 6		Pts: Ömer Yurtseven 14; Rebs: Ömer Yurtseven 7, Ahmet Duran 7 Asts: Ömer Al 6

Riga Olympic Centre, Riga
Attendance: 450
Referees: Carlos Peruga (ESP), Carmelo Paternico (ITA), Ernad Karovic (BIH)

29 August 2014
20:15

Spain	71–81	Latvia
Scoring by quarter: 20–20, 18–26, 21–19, 12–16
Pts: Eric Martinez 21; Rebs: Victor Moreno 6 Asts: Pol Figueras 5		Pts: Rodions Kurucs 23; Rebs: Arturs Strautins 9, Roberts Blumbergs 9 Asts: Kristers Zoriks 6

Riga Olympic Centre, Riga
Attendance: 650
Referees: Marko Juras (SRB), Sérgio Silva (POR), Yener Yilmaz (TUR)

== Final classification games ==
=== Match for 15th place ===
30 August 2014
13:30

Report

Denmark	54–69	Poland
Scoring by quarter: 7–22, 16–20, 17–13, 14–14
Pts: Oscar Friis 20; Rebs: David Kristensen 13; Asts: Asbjoern Nerlov 3, Martin Poulsen 3		Pts: Mateusz Szczypinski 22; Rebs: Mateusz Szczypinski 9 Asts: Jakub Kobel 12

Riga Olympic Centre II, Riga
Attendance: 60
Referees: Vilius Maciulaitis (LTU), Jong Kuk Kim (KOR), Sergiy Chebyshev (UKR)

=== Match for 13th place ===
30 August 2014
15:45

Report

Finland	66–61 (OT)	Ukraine
Scoring by quarter: 19–7, 23–18, 7–17, 5–12, Overtime: 12–7
Pts: Edon Maxhuni 29; Rebs: Elias Valtonen 9 Asts: Elias Valtonen 3		Pts: Dmytro Skapintsev 22; Rebs: Danyyil Ovcharenko 12; Asts: 3 players tied with 3

Riga Olympic Centre II, Riga
Attendance: 70
Referees: Marko Juras (SRB), Sérgio Silva (POR), Christoph Rohacky (AUT)

=== Match for 11th place ===
30 August 2014
18:00

Report

Russia	64–69	Croatia
Scoring by quarter: 11–18, 11–14, 21–15, 21–22
Pts: Daniil Trostin 27; Rebs: Andrei Lopatin 6 Asts: Egor Bestuzhev 5		Pts: Marko Prskalo 17; Rebs: Karlo Uljarevic 12; Asts: Karlo Uljarevic 4

Riga Olympic Centre II, Riga
Attendance: 20
Referees: Carlos Peruga (ESP), Anastasios Manos (GRE), Riannan Louise De La Torre (AUS)

=== Match for 9th place ===
30 August 2014
20:15

Report

Lithuania	68–77	Greece
Scoring by quarter: 10–11, 18–23, 19–16, 21–27
Pts: Arnoldas Kulboka 21; Rebs: Rokas Gadiliauskas 7 Asts: Eimantas Stankevicius 9		Pts: Michail Lountzis 13; Rebs: Georgios Tarlas 9 Asts: Michail Lountzis 9

Riga Olympic Centre II, Riga
Attendance: 20
Referees: Carmelo Paternico (ITA), Luis Lopes (POR), Alexey Chudin (RUS)

=== Match for 7th place ===
30 August 2014
13:30

Report

Germany	110–69	Bosnia and Herzegovina
Scoring by quarter: 20–13, 32–24, 32–9, 26–23
Pts: Kostja Mushidi 28; Rebs: 3 players tied with 5 Asts: Kostja Mushidi 6		Pts: Dzanan Musa 31; Rebs: Dzanan Musa 8 Asts: Mateo Zovko 3

Riga Olympic Centre, Riga
Attendance: 120
Referees: Yener Yilmaz (TUR), Bo Bundgaard (DEN), David Berishvili (GEO)

=== Match for 5th place ===
30 August 2014
15:45

Report

Serbia	66–72	Italy
Scoring by quarter: 24–20, 15–20, 11–14, 16–18
Pts: Aleksandar Aranitovic 17; Rebs: Matija Radovic 7 Asts: Aleksandar Aranitovic, Matija Radovic 4		Pts: Riccardo Visconti 21; Rebs: Lorenzo Bucarelli 8 Asts: Lorenzo Bucarelli 11

Riga Olympic Centre, Riga
Attendance: 150
Referees: Jean-Charles Collin (FRA), Ernad Karovic (BIH), Yury Ihnatsyeu (BLR)

=== Bronze medal match ===
30 August 2014
18:00

Report

Spain	77–73	Turkey
Scoring by quarter: 21–16, 20–26, 13–17, 23–14
Pts: Victor Moreno 17; Rebs: Aleix Font 8, Sergi Martinez 8 Asts: Aleix Font 5		Pts: Oguzhan Yarol 26; Rebs: Ömer Yurtseven 8 Asts: Ömer Al 10

Riga Olympic Centre, Riga
Attendance: 500
Referees: Arnis Ozols (LAT), Sergey Mikhaylov (RUS), Wojciech Liszka (POL)

=== Final ===
30 August 2014
20:15

Report

Latvia	53–78	France
Scoring by quarter: 12–14, 10–11, 21–26, 10–27
Pts: Arturs Strautins 17; Rebs: Rodions Kurucs 7 Asts: Kristers Zoriks 4		Pts: Killian Tillie 25; Rebs: Killian Tillie 18; Asts: 3 players tied with 3

Riga Olympic Centre, Riga
Attendance: 950
Referees: Sasa Pukl (SLO), David Romano (ISR), Luka Kardum (CRO)

== Final standings ==
Rank	Team
1st place, gold medalist(s)	France
2nd place, silver medalist(s)	Latvia
3rd place, bronze medalist(s)	Spain
4th	Turkey
5th	Italy
6th	Serbia
7th	Germany
8th	Bosnia and Herzegovina
9th	Greece
10th	Lithuania
11th	Croatia
12th	Russia
13th	Finland
14th	Ukraine
15th	Poland
16th	Denmark

2014 FIBA Europe Under-16 Championship winners

France
Second title

Relegated to the 2015 FIBA Europe Under-16 Championship Division B

== All-Tournament Team ==
- (Latvia) Kristers Zoriks
- (France) Bathiste Tchouaffe
- (Latvia) Rodions Kurucs
- (Turkey) Ömer Yurtseven
- (France) Killian Tillie (MVP)
