= Launitz =

Launitz is a surname. Notable people with the surname include:

- Eduard Schmidt von der Launitz (1796–1869), Russian-German sculptor
- Robert Eberhard Launitz (1806–1870), Russian-American sculptor, nephew of Eduard
- Wilhelm Schmidt von der Launitz (1802–1864), Baltic German general

== See also ==
- Lauritz
