= Denmark men's national under-16 basketball team =

National basketball team of Denmark

Denmark
- FIBA zone: FIBA Europe
- National federation: Danmarks Basketball Forbund

U17 World Cup
- Appearances: None

U16 EuroBasket
- Appearances: 3
- Medals: None

U16 EuroBasket Division B
- Appearances: 14
- Medals: Gold: 1 (2013); Silver: 1 (2009); Bronze: 1 (2019)
Home	Away

The Denmark men's national under-16 basketball team is a national basketball team of Denmark, administered by the Danish Basketball Association. It represents the country in international under-16 men's basketball competitions.

== FIBA U16 EuroBasket participations ==
Year	Division A	Division B
2008		18th
2009		2nd place, silver medalist(s)
2010	16th	
2011		17th
2012		13th
2013		1st place, gold medalist(s)
2014	16th	
2015		11th
2016		19th

Year	Division A	Division B
2017		18th
2018		12th
2019		3rd place, bronze medalist(s)
2022	16th	
2023		9th
2024		16th
2025		9th
2026		17th

== See also ==
- Denmark men's national basketball team
- Denmark men's national under-18 basketball team
- Denmark women's national under-16 basketball team
