= Johann Christian Gustav Lucae =

German anthropologist and physician (1814–1885)

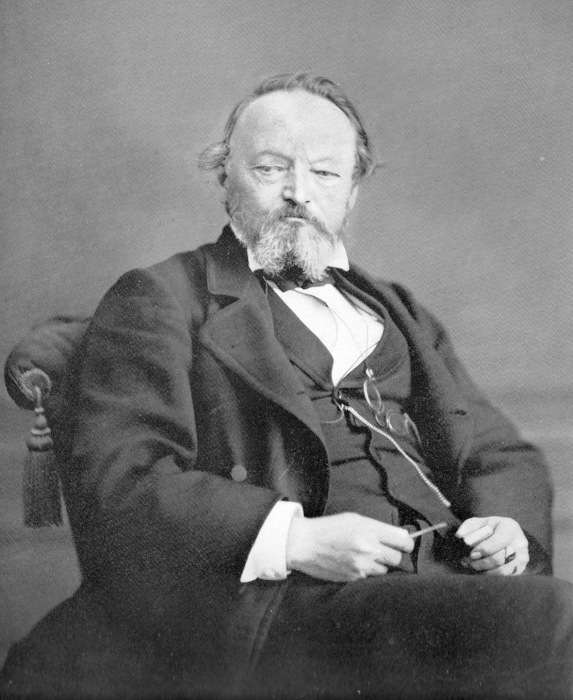
Johann Christian Gustav Lucae

Johann Christian Gustav Lucae (14 March 1814, Frankfurt am Main – 3 February 1885, Frankfurt am Main) was a German anatomist known for his studies in the field of craniology.

== Biography ==
From 1833 he studied medicine at the universities of Marburg and Würzburg, receiving his doctorate at Marburg in 1839. After graduation he settled as a general practitioner in his hometown of Frankfurt. Beginning in 1845 he worked as a lecturer of pathology at the Senckenberg Institute of Anatomy. From 1851 he taught classes in anatomy and subsequently became director of the institute, a position he maintained up until his death. In 1863 he obtained the title of professor, and in 1869 began teaching anatomy classes at the Städel Art Institute.

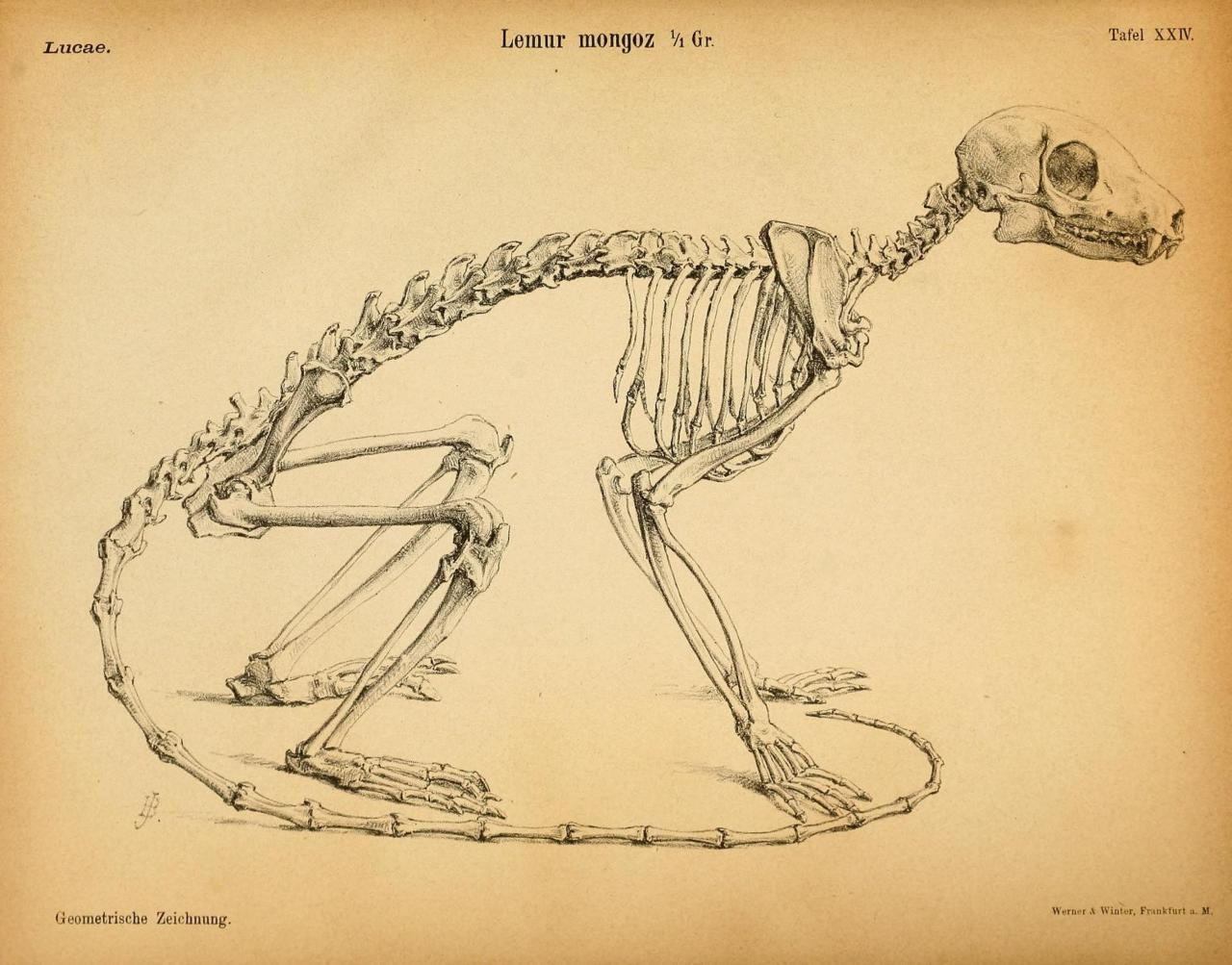
Skeleton of a lemur in Die Statik und Mechanik der Quadrupeden (1883).

In collaboration with sculptor Eduard Schmidt von der Launitz, he developed improved methods for drawing anatomical objects.

Lucae was one of the 56 founding members of the Freies Deutsches Hochstift (Free German Foundation).

== Selected writings ==
- Schädelzeichnungen, 1840 – – Anatomical drawings of skulls.
- Zur Morphologie des Säugethier-Schädels, 1872 – The morphology of mammal skulls.
- Affen- und Menschenschädel im Bau und Wachsthum verglichen, 1873 – Monkey and human skulls in construction and growth compared.
- Zur Morphologie der Rassen-Schädel, einleitende Bemerkungen und Beiträge; ein Sendschreiben an Carl Ernst v. Baer, 1876 – The morphology of racial skulls; Introductory remarks and contributions; a missive to Karl Ernst von Baer.
- Die Robbe und die Otter (Phoca vitulina und Lutra vulgaris) : in ihrem Knochen-und Muskel-skelet, 1876 – The seal and the otter (Lutra vulgaris and Phoca vitulina): involving bone and musculoskeleton.
- Die statik und mechanik der quadrupeden an dem skelet und den muskeln eines lemur und eines choloepus, 1883 – The statics and mechanics of quadrupeds ... the skeleton and muscles of lemurs and Choloepus.
