= Tommaso Oxilia =

Italian basketball player

Virtus Pallacanestro Bologna
- Position: Shooting guard / small forward
- League: Serie A2 Basket

Personal information
- Born: April 22, 1998 (age 28) Pietra Ligure, Italy
- Listed height: 6 ft 6 in (1.98 m)
- Listed weight: 190 lb (86 kg)

Career information
- Playing career: 2013–present

Career history
- 2013–present: Virtus Pallacanestro Bologna
Medals
Men's basketball
Representing Italy
FIBA Under-19 World Cup
Silver medal – second place	2017 Egypt	U-19 National Team
FIBA Europe Under-18 Championship
Bronze medal – third place	2016 Turkey	U-18 National Team

Tommaso Oxilia (born April 22, 1998) is an Italian professional basketball player for Virtus Pallacanestro Bologna.

== Professional career ==
A product of A.S.D. Basket Loano, Oxilia joined the youth ranks of Virtus Pallacanestro Bologna in 2013. He made his debut in Italy's top flight Lega Basket Serie A during the 2013-14 season. In 2016-17, Oxilia made 29 appearances for Bologna, averaging 3.1 points a contest, helping the squad capture the Serie A2 Basket championship after being relegated from the Serie A the year before.

== National team career ==
Oxilia competed with Italy's junior national team at the under-16 European Championship in 2014, and he won a bronze medal with the Italian under-18 national team at the 2016 U18 European Championship.

In July 2017, he was influential in helping Italy;s junior national team win a silver medal at the FIBA U19 World Cup in Egypt, while leading the team in scoring (12.9 points per game) and rebounding (8.0 rebounds per game) throughout the tournament. He was named to the tournament's All-Star-Five.
