= Bathiste Tchouaffé =

French basketball player

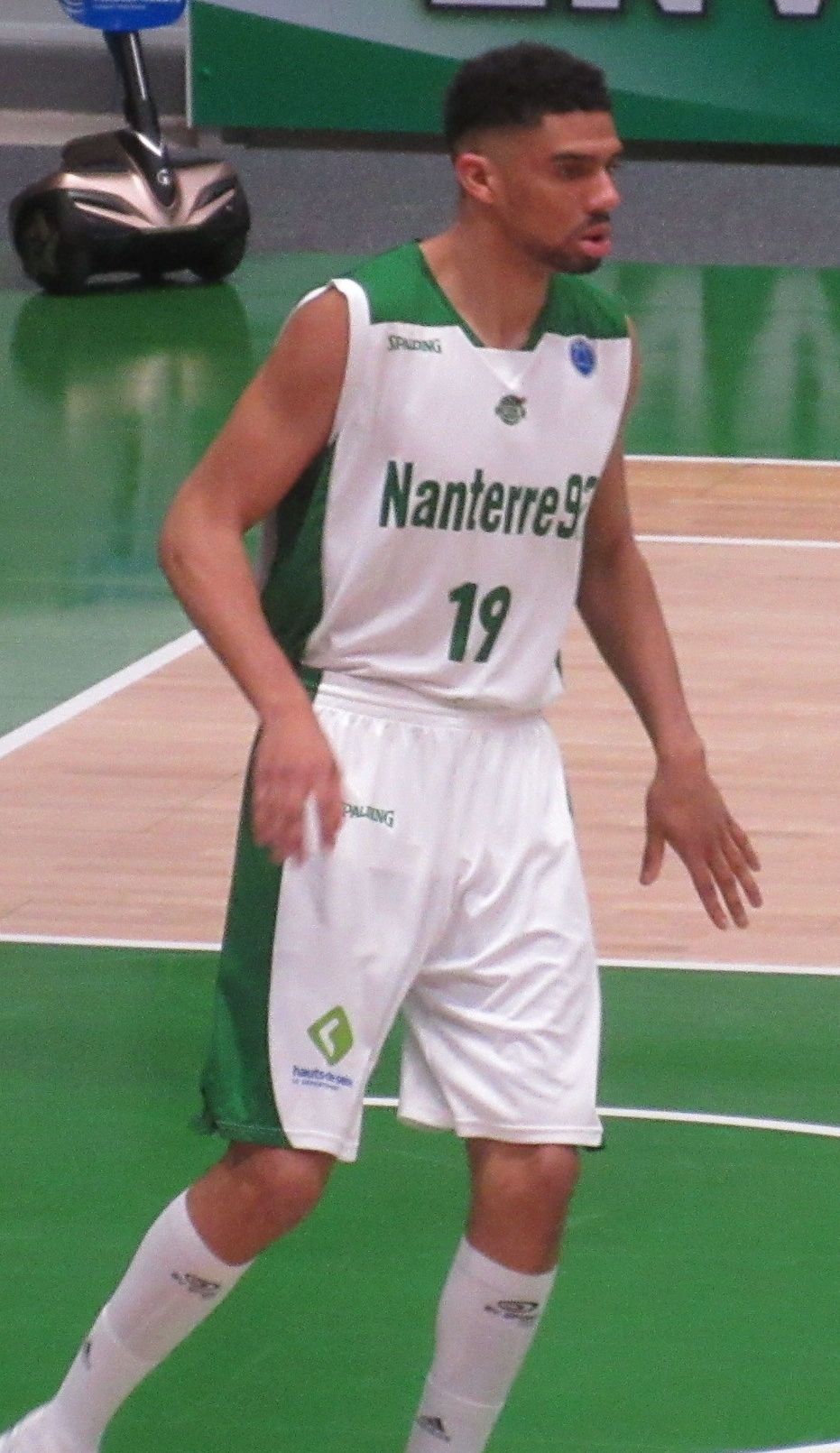
- Tchouaffé with Nanterre in 2017

No. 8 – Olympique Antibes
- Position: Shooting guard
- League: LNB Pro B

Personal information
- Born: May 19, 1998 (age 26); Poitiers, France
- Listed height: 1.97 m (6 ft 6 in)
- Listed weight: 87 kg (192 lb)

Career information
- Playing career: 2016–present

Career history
- 2016–2018: Nanterre 92
- 2018–2019: JL Bourg
- 2019–2020: →Poitiers Basket 86
- 2020–2021: UJAP Quimper Basket
- 2021–2023: Boulazac Basket Dordogne
- 2023–2024: Champagne Basket
- 2024–present: Olympique Antibes

Career highlights
- FIBA Europe Cup champion (2017); French Cup champion (2017)
Medals
Men's basketball
Representing France
FIBA Europe U18 Championship
Gold medal – first place	2016 Turkey	U-18 Team
FIBA Europe U16 Championship
Gold medal – first place	2014 Latvia	U-16 Team
Men's 3x3 Basketball
FIBA 3x3 U18 World Championship
Bronze medal – third place	2015 Hungary	U-18 Team

Bathiste Tchouaffé (born May 19, 1998 in Poitiers) is a French professional basketball player. He is currently playing for Olympique Antibes of the French LNB Pro B.

== Early career ==
The product of a basketball family, both his mother and father played the game. Tchouaffé played in the youth sides of ASPTT Poitiers, PVBC Pouzioux Vouneuil Basket Club, CEP Poitiers and Poitiers Basket 86. From 2012 to 2016, he attended INSEP, the French National Institute of Sport, expertise, and performance, averaging 12.6 points, 3.4 rebounds, 2.3 assists a game in his final season (2015–16) in the NM1, the third tier of French basketball.

== Professional career ==
In May 2016, he signed his first professional contract, a three-year deal with Nanterre 92 of the French elite league LNB Pro A. Tchouaffé attended the 2018 Nike Hoop Summit, recording two points in 9:11 minutes of play.

On 3 August 2018, Tchouaffé signed a three-year contract with JL Bourg.

On June 20, 2019, he has loaned to Poitiers Basket 86 of the French LNB Pro B for one season in order to continue his development. In the 2020-21 season, Tchouaffé averaged 12.5 points a game for Pro B outfit Quimper, in the summer of 2021, he signed a deal with another second-division side, Boulazac Basket Dordogne.

Tchouaffé signed with Champagne Basket of the LNB Pro B in June 2023. In August 2024, he inked a deal with fellow Pro B side Olympique Antibes.

== National team career ==
He was a key part of the French under-16 national team that won gold at the 2014 European Championships, tallying 14.7 points, 4.4 boards, 1.9 assists and 1.1 steals per outing during the tournament. For his efforts, he was named to the Eurobasket.com All-European Championships U16 1st Team, alongside players like his teammate Kilian Tillie, Latvia's Rodions Kurucs and Turkey's Ömer Yurtseven.

In 2015, Tchouaffé was a member of the French squad that went third at the FIBA 3x3 U18 World Championships in Hungary, and he also won the shoot out contest. He won gold at the 2016 U18 European Championships with France, averaging 10.0 points as well as 4.7 boards a game in the tournament.

He competed for France in the 2017 FIBA Under-19 Basketball World Cup, averaging 10.9 points a contest.
