= Killian Tillie =

French basketball player (born 1998)

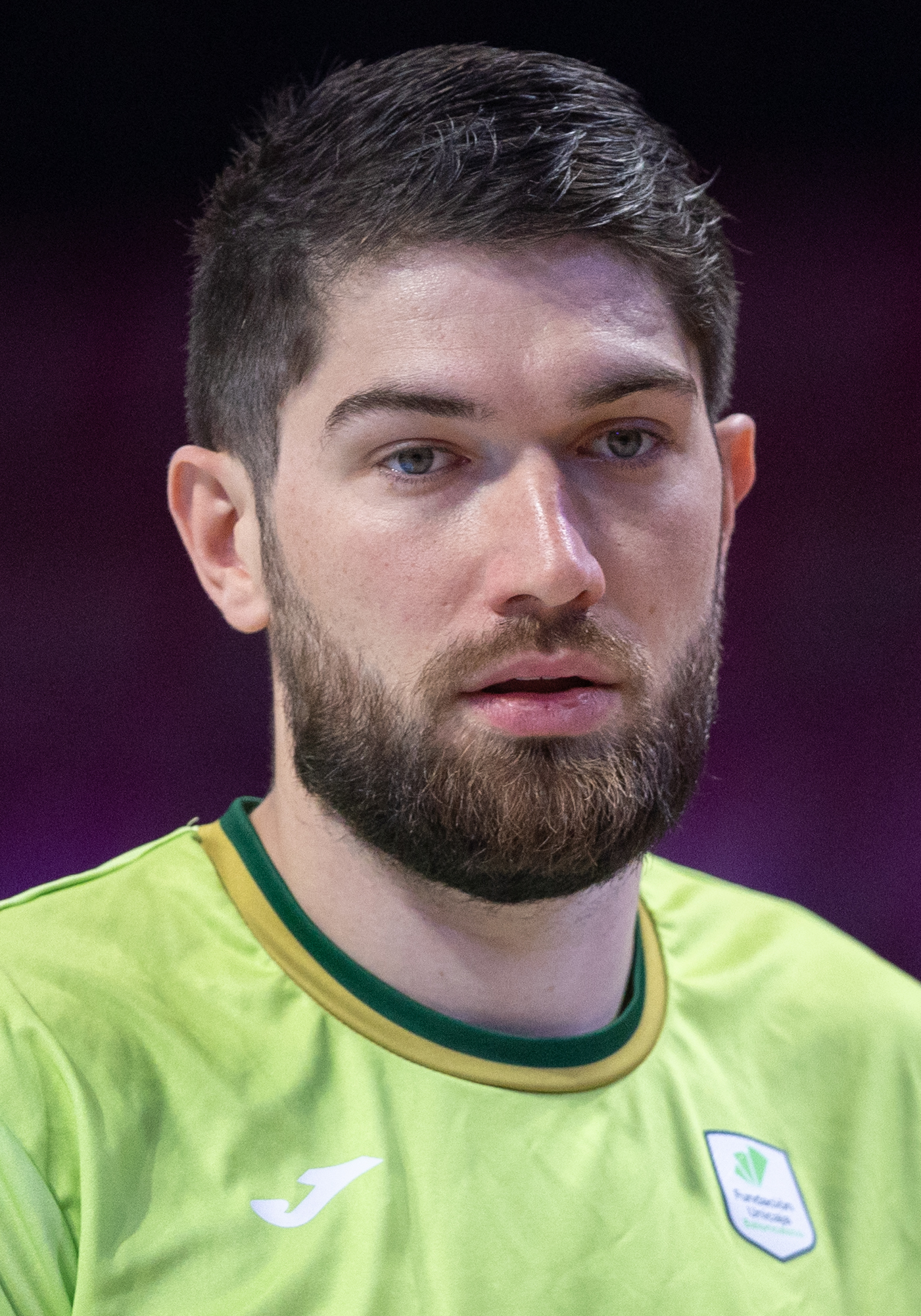
- Tillie in 2026

No. 33 – Unicaja Málaga
- Position: Power forward / center
- League: Liga ACB

Personal information
- Born: 5 March 1998 (age 28) Paris, France
- Listed height: 6 ft 9 in (2.06 m)
- Listed weight: 220 lb (100 kg)

Career information
- High school: INSEP (Paris, France)
- College: Gonzaga (2016–2020)
- NBA draft: 2020: undrafted
- Playing career: 2020–present

Career history
- 2020–2022: Memphis Grizzlies
- 2021: →Memphis Hustle
- 2024–present: Unicaja Málaga

Career highlights
- Basketball Champions League champion (2025); 2× FIBA Intercontinental Cup champion (2024, 2025); First-team All-WCC (2020); Second-team All-WCC (2018); WCC tournament MOP (2018); FIBA Europe Under-16 Championship MVP (2014)
- Stats at NBA.com
- Stats at Basketball Reference
Medals
Men's basketball
Representing France
FIBA Europe U16 Championship
Gold medal – first place	2014 Latvia
FIBA 3x3 U18 World Championship
Bronze medal – third place	2015 Hungary

Killian Wiard Tillie (born 5 March 1998) is a French professional basketball player for Unicaja Málaga of the Liga ACB. He played college basketball for the Gonzaga Bulldogs.

== Youth career ==
Tillie played basketball and volleyball until the age of 14, before choosing to focus on basketball. He started his basketball career in the youth setup at Cagnes Basket, when he was six years of age. He then moved to Stade Laurentin Basket, before joining the youth academy of Olympique d'Antibes in 2013. Prior to the 2014–15 season, he joined the INSEP academy.

=== Recruiting ===
"Killian is a dynamic athlete that will end up being a very good faceup-type four. Once we get him in the weight room and work on his strength, he’ll be a very good player at the highest level."

— Mark Few, Gonzaga Head Coach.

"We expect him to contribute right away, if his health is under control with some knee issues. He is one of those really interesting guys. He has incredible instincts. It's probably hard to pinpoint his strengths, but he doesn’t really have a weakness either. He has tremendous upside, and we think his potential is off the charts."

— Tommy Lloyd, Gonzaga Associate Head Coach.

In January 2015, Tillie was highlighted by ESPN among five of the best international players in the 2015 and 2016 classes with aspirations to play college basketball. He was drawing major interest from California at the time, and scouts were impressed with his terrific offensive rebounding, athleticism and high motor.

In August 2015, Tillie traveled to the United States and took official visits to Georgia Tech, Utah, and Gonzaga. Less than a week after his trip to Spokane, he verbally to committed to play college basketball at Gonzaga University, citing the Zags' "success with international players and because of the people that love basketball there." He signed with the Zags in the early signing period in November 2015.

College recruiting
Name	Hometown	School	Height	Weight	Commit date
Killian Tillie; F	Antibes, France	INSEP	6 ft 10 in (2.08 m)	230 lb (100 kg)	Aug 29, 2015
Killian Tillie; F	Recruit ratings: Scout: Rivals: 247Sports: ESPN: (NR)				
Overall recruit ranking: Scout: NR Rivals: NR 247Sports: #67 ESPN: NR
Note: In many cases, Scout, Rivals, 247Sports, On3, and ESPN may conflict in their listings of height and weight.; In these cases, the average was taken. ESPN grades are on a 100-point scale.; Sources: "2016 Gonzaga Rivals Commits". Rivals.; "2016 Gonzaga Scout Commits". Scout.; "2016 Gonzaga ESPN Commits". ESPN.; "Scout.com Team Recruiting Rankings". Scout.; "2016 Team Ranking". Rivals.; "2016 Gonzaga 24/7 Sports Commits". 247Sports.

== College career ==
He made his first appearance in a Gonzaga jersey on November 5, 2016, when scoring four points to go along with four rebounds, three assists, two blocked shots and two steals in twelve minutes of play against West Georgia. As a freshman during the 2016–17 season, Tillie appeared in 33 games, averaging 4.2 points and 3.2 rebounds in 12.3 minutes. He saw 14 minutes of action in the NCAA championship game against North Carolina, pulling down nine rebounds and scoring one point.

As a sophomore in 2017–18, Tillie was Gonzaga's second leading scorer, averaging 12.9 points in 26.2 minutes per game to go along with 5.9 rebounds and 1 blocked shot per contest.

Coming into his junior season, Tillie was named to the Preseason All-WCC Team. On October 30, 2018, it was announced that Tillie was to miss approximately eight weeks with a stress fracture on his ankle.

Tillie missed the beginning of his senior season recovering from a knee injury. He returned to the lineup on November 19, 2019, finishing with 15 points and eight rebounds as Gonzaga held off Texas-Arlington 72–66. On January 30, 2020, Tillie left a game against Santa Clara in the first half after suffering an ankle injury. At the conclusion of the regular season, Tillie was named to the First Team All-WCC. He averaged 13.6 points and 5.0 rebounds per game as a senior.

== Professional career ==
=== Memphis Grizzlies (2020–2022) ===
After going undrafted in the 2020 NBA draft, Tillie signed a two-way contract with the Memphis Grizzlies on 24 November 2020.

On 12 August 2021, Tillie signed a second two-way contract with the Grizzlies. On 1 January 2022, he signed a two-year standard contract.

The Grizzlies waived Tillie on 15 October 2022, before the start of the 2022–23 season.

=== Unicaja (2024–present) ===
On 21 August 2024, Tillie signed with Unicaja of the Liga ACB.

== National team career ==
Tillie helped the French Under-16 National Team win the 2014 FIBA Europe Under-16 Championship, averaging 14.3 points, 9.6 rebounds, 1.7 assists, 1.2 blocked shots and 1.2 steals a contest, while being recognized as the tournament's MVP. He dropped in 25 points and grabbed 18 boards, in the title game, a 78–53 win over hosting Latvia.

In the summer of 2015, Tillie competed in the FIBA 3x3 Under-18 World Championships, where he teamed up with Bathiste Tchouaffe, Jules Rambaut, and Timothe Vergiat and he represented France at the 2015 World Championship, in Debrecen, Hungary, where they finished in third place, with an 8–1 record. His team defeated USA, featuring fellow Gonzaga commit Zach Collins, in the quarter-finals, before losing to Argentina in the semifinals, and thumping Spain in the third-place game.

He competed for France at the 2017 FIBA Under-19 World Cup, averaging team-bests of 12.4 points and 8.7 rebounds a contest.

== Career statistics ==
Legend
GP	Games played	GS	Games started	MPG	Minutes per game
FG%	Field goal percentage	3P%	3-point field goal percentage	FT%	Free throw percentage
RPG	Rebounds per game	APG	Assists per game	SPG	Steals per game
BPG	Blocks per game	PPG	Points per game	**Bold**	Career high

=== NBA ===
Year	Team	GP	GS	MPG	FG%	3P%	FT%	RPG	APG	SPG	BPG	PPG
2020–21	Memphis	18	1	10.1	.333	.303	**.818**	1.3	.4	.3	**.4**	3.2
2021–22	Memphis	**36**	**3**	**12.8**	**.339**	**.314**	.625	**1.7**	**.6**	**.6**	**.4**	**3.3**
Career		54	4	11.9	.337	.311	.737	1.6	.6	.5	.4	3.2

=== College ===
Year	Team	GP	GS	MPG	FG%	3P%	FT%	RPG	APG	SPG	BPG	PPG
2016–17	Gonzaga	33	0	12.2	.511	.478	**.778**	3.2	.6	.7	.3	4.2
2017–18	Gonzaga	**36**	**35**	**26.2**	**.580**	**.479**	.773	**5.9**	1.7	.8	**1.0**	12.9
2018–19	Gonzaga	15	0	16.6	.500	.438	.643	3.9	1.5	.7	.7	6.2
2019–20	Gonzaga	24	24	24.6	.535	.400	.726	5.0	**1.9**	**1.0**	.8	**13.6**
Career		108	59	20.3	.548	.444	.750	4.6	1.4	.8	.7	9.5

== Personal life ==
He is the son of Laurent Tillie, a former professional volleyball player and coach of the French national team, and Caroline Keulen-Tillie, a former professional volleyball player from the Netherlands. Killian's brothers are also professional athletes: Kim Tillie plays basketball and Kevin Tillie plays volleyball. Tillie married his wife Hailee during a courthouse ceremony on December 27, 2023 and later held awedding celebration at Château de la Napoule in France in 2024.
