= Kostja Mushidi =

German basketball player (born 1998)

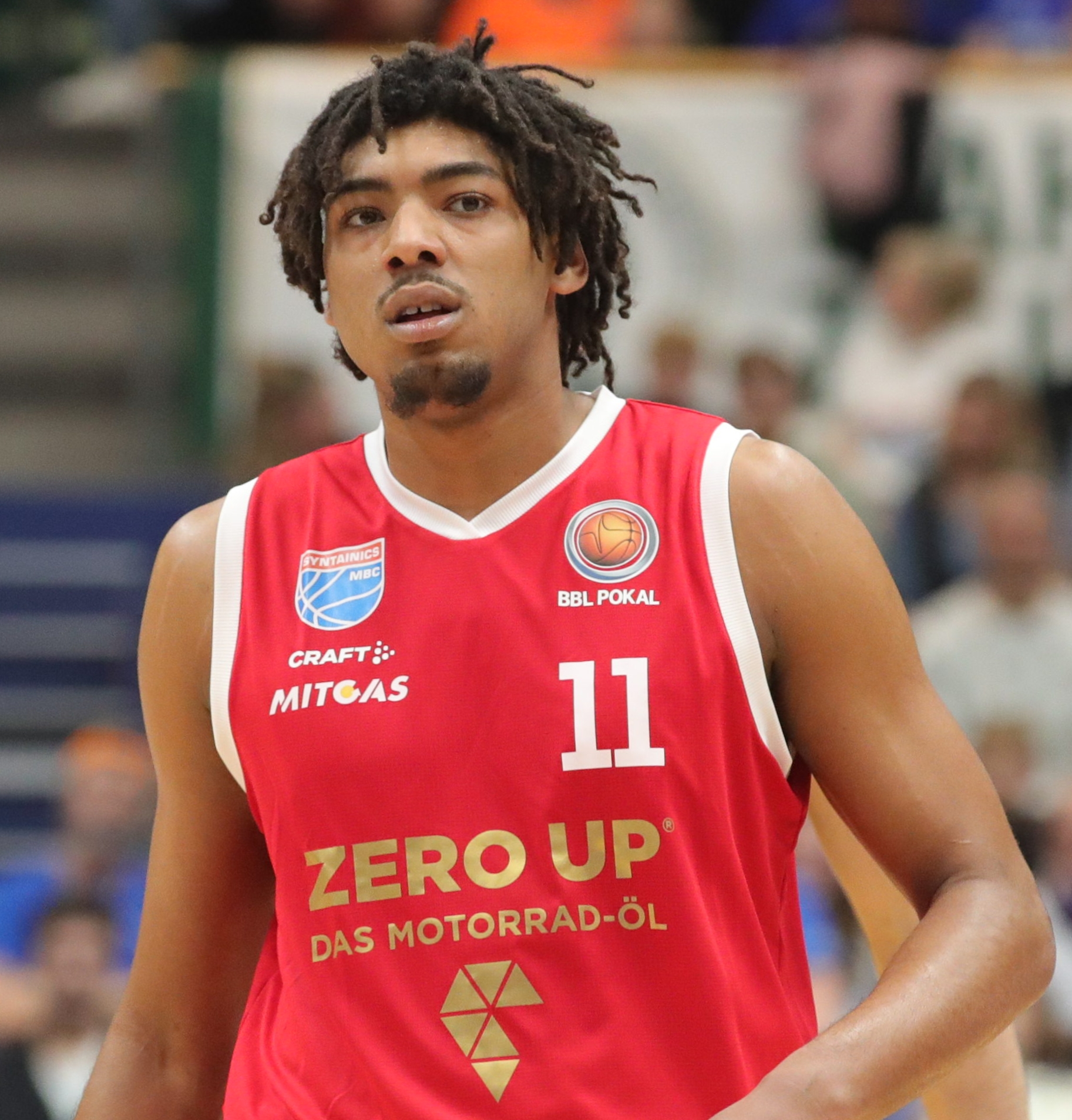
- Mushidi with Mitteldeutscher BC in 2023

No. 10 – Mitteldeutscher BC
- Position: Shooting guard
- League: Basketball Bundesliga

Personal information
- Born: 18 June 1998 (age 28) Uccle, Belgium
- Listed height: 1.95 m (6 ft 5 in)
- Listed weight: 95 kg (209 lb)

Career information
- Playing career: 2015–present

Career history
- 2015–2016: SIG Strasbourg
- 2016–2019: Mega Basket
- 2019: →OKK Beograd
- 2019; 2020–2021: Löwen Braunschweig
- 2021–2024: Mitteldeutscher BC
- 2024–2025: Göttingen
- 2025–2026: Niners Chemnitz
- 2026–present: Mitteldeutscher BC

Career highlights
- Albert Schweitzer Tournament MVP (2016); Nike Hoop Summit (2017)
Medals
Men's basketball
Representing Germany
FIBA U20 European Championship
Bronze medal – third place	2018 Germany	Team

Kostja Kalonda Didier Mushidi (born 18 June 1998) is a German professional basketball player for Mitteldeutscher BC of the Basketball Bundesliga (BBL). Born in Belgium to a Belgian-Congolese mother and a Russian father, Mushidi moved to Germany with his family at the age of 2. Mushidi stands 1.95 m (6 ft 5 in) tall and plays the shooting guard position.

== Early years and youth career ==
A product of ART Düsseldorf, Mushidi later transferred to the Dragons Rhöndorf, where he played in the youth system and strengthened Team Rhöndorf/Bonn's JBBL (under-16 Bundesliga) side starting with the 2012-13 season. After moving to the organization's under 19 side, Mushidi averaged 20.2 points, 7.2 rebounds, 2.2 assists and 1.6 steals per game in the 2014-15 season. He had made his first appearances on Rhoendorf's men's team in Germany's third division during the 2013-14 campaign.

== Professional career ==
In August 2015, Mushidi inked a two-year deal with French powerhouse Strasbourg IG. He played a total of six minutes for SIG's men's team in the 2015–16 LNB Pro A season, while mostly representing the club's development squad. He left the club after one year and signed with Serbian club Mega Leks in June 2016.

At the 2017 Nike Hoop Summit, he led the World Select Team with 14 points to go along with three assists, three steals and two rebounds. In February 2019, he left Mega Bemax to join OKK Beograd, where he left for the remainder of the 2018-19 season.

In June 2019, he signed with Basketball Löwen Braunschweig of the German Basketball Bundesliga. On 13 December 2019, he was dismissed for disciplinary reasons, the team announced without disclosing any further details. In eight Bundesliga appearances for the Braunschweig team, Mushidi averaged 11.6 points, 3.9 rebounds and 1.6 assists per contest. Mushidi was given a second chance by the Braunschweig outfit, joining the club back in August 2020.

On 1 December 2021, he has signed with Mitteldeutscher BC of the Basketball Bundesliga. In his first season with the club he was able to average 11.6 points and 2.0 rebounds per game across 25 contests.

Mushidi inked a deal with fellow Bundesliga side BG Göttingen in early October 2024.

On June 3, 2025, he signed with Niners Chemnitz of the Basketball Bundesliga (BBL).

On August 27, 2026, he signed a three-months contract with Mitteldeutscher BC of the Basketball Bundesliga (BBL). On October 20, his contract has been extended until the end of the season.

== National team career ==
On the international stage, Mushidi represented Germany at the 2014 FIBA Europe Under-16 Championship, scoring a team-high 17.7 points per game during the tournament, while garnering Eurobasket.com All-European Championships U16 Second Team recognition. The following year, he helped Germany to an eighth-place finish at the Europe U18 Championship, leading the team in scoring along with Isaiah Hartenstein as both averaged 11.6 points a contest.

Mushidi led the German U18 national team to its first ever Albert-Schweitzer-Tournament title in March/April 2016, posting 25 points and 11 rebounds in the championship game against Serbia, and was named tournament MVP. In July 2016, he attended the U20 European championships, averaging 8.4 points, 2.6 rebounds and 1.1 assists a game throughout the tournament, while finishing in fourth place with the German team. He tallied team-bests 14.7 points and 3.8 assists along with 3.8 rebounds and 1.3 steals a contest on the way to a fourth-place finish at the 2016 U18 European Championships in Turkey.

He was Germany's co-leading scorer at the 2018 FIBA Europe Under-20 Championship, where he averaged 13.6 points a game, helping his team win the bronze medal, while being named to the All-Star Five. In November 2018, he was named to the roster of the German men's national team for the first time.
