= Vassilis Christidis =

Greek basketball player (born 1998)

No. 14 – Kolossos Rodou
- Position: Center
- League: Greek Basketball League

Personal information
- Born: 10 July 1998 (age 28) Thessaloniki, Greece
- Listed height: 6 ft 9.5 in (2.07 m)
- Listed weight: 240 lb (109 kg)

Career information
- Playing career: 2016–present

Career history
- 2016–2019: Aris Thessaloniki
- 2019–2021: Olympiacos B
- 2021–2022: Olympiacos
- 2021–2022: →Peristeri
- 2022–2023: PAOK Thessaloniki
- 2023: Aris Thessaloniki
- 2023–2025: Karditsa
- 2025–2026: Iraklis Thessaloniki
- 2026–present: Kolossos Rodou
Medals
Men's basketball
Representing Greece
FIBA Europe Under-20 Championship
Gold medal – first place	2017 Greece	Under-20
FIBA Europe Under-18 Championship
Gold medal – first place	2015 Greece	Under-18

Vassilis Christidis (alternate spellings: Vasilis, Vasileios) (Greek: Βασίλης Χρηστίδης; born 10 July 1998) is a Greek professional basketball player for Kolossos Rodou. He is a 2.07 m (6 ft 9 in) tall center.

== Professional career ==
Christidis started playing basketball with the youth teams of Mantoulidis. He then played in the Greek minors with Mantoulidis. He signed a contract with Aris in 2015, but he was loaned back to Mantoulidis for the 2015–16 season.

Christidis began his pro career in 2016, with the top-tier level Greek League club Aris, when he debuted in a Greek League game against Promitheas Patras. He joined Olympiacos' new reserve team of the Greek 2nd Division, Olympiacos B, for the 2019–20 season.

On 21 December 2021, Christidis was loaned from Olympiacos to Peristeri, under coach Milan Tomić. In 13 league games, he averaged 7 points, 4.6 rebounds, 1.3 assists and 0.3 blocks, playing around 18 minutes per contest.

On 7 July 2022, Christidis moved to PAOK. On 25 January 2022, he parted ways with the team. In 11 league games, he averaged 2.5 points and 1.7 rebounds, playing around 10 minutes per contest. On 27 January 2023, Christidis returned to Aris. In 8 league games, he averaged 3.4 points and 2.6 rebounds, playing around 15 minutes per contest.

On 19 July 2023, Christidis signed with Karditsa. On 19 July 2025, Christidis signed a one-year contract with Iraklis of the Greek Basketball League.

On June 5, 2026, he moved to Kolossos Rodou.

== National team career ==
=== Greek junior national team ===
As a member of the Greek junior national teams, Christidis played at the 2014 FIBA Europe Under-16 Championship, and at the 2015 FIBA Europe Under-18 Championship, where he won a gold medal. He also played at the 2017 FIBA Europe Under-20 Championship, where he won a gold medal.

=== Greek senior national team ===
Christidis became a member of the Greece men's national basketball team in 2017.
