= Ömer Yurtseven =

Turkish basketball player (born 1998)

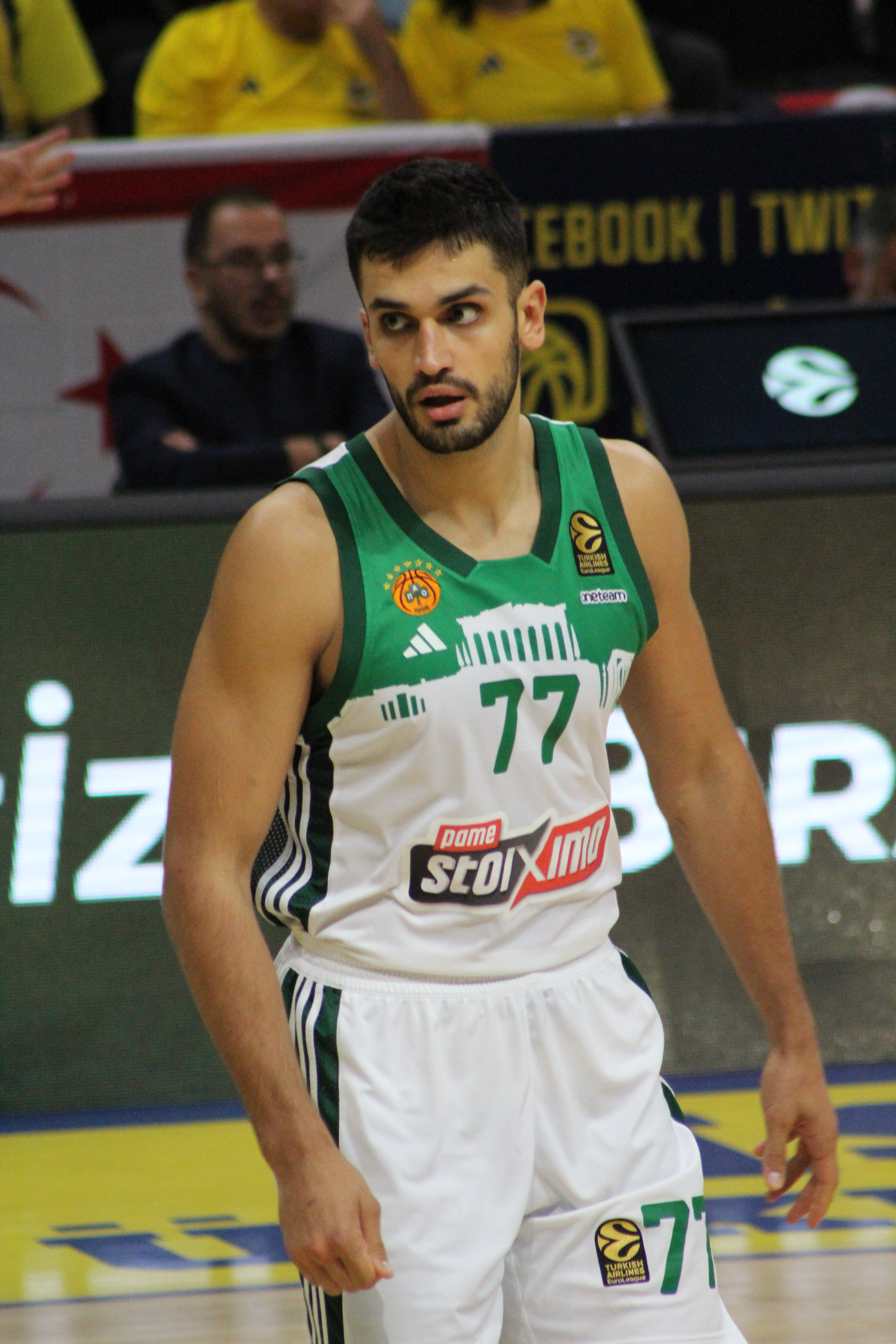
- Yurtseven with Panathinaikos in 2024

No. 77 – Rio Grande Valley Vipers
- Position: Center
- League: NBA G League

Personal information
- Born: 19 June 1998 (age 28) Tashkent, Uzbekistan
- Listed height: 2.11 m (6 ft 11 in)
- Listed weight: 125 kg (276 lb)

Career information
- College: NC State (2016–2018); Georgetown (2019–2020)
- NBA draft: 2020: undrafted
- Playing career: 2013–present

Career history
- 2013–2016: Fenerbahçe
- 2021: Oklahoma City Blue
- 2021–2023: Miami Heat
- 2023: →Sioux Falls Skyforce
- 2023–2024: Utah Jazz
- 2024–2026: Panathinaikos
- 2026: Rio Grande Valley Vipers
- 2026: Golden State Warriors
- 2026: Real Madrid
- 2026–present: Rio Grande Valley Vipers

Career highlights
- 2x Greek Cup winner (2025, 2026); Turkish League champion (2014); Third-team All-ACC (2018)
- Stats at NBA.com
- Stats at Basketball Reference
Medals
Men's basketball
Representing Turkey
EuroBasket
Silver medal – second place	2025 Cyprus–Finland–Poland–Latvia
FIBA Europe Under-20 Championship
Bronze medal – third place	2016 Finland	U20 team
FIBA Europe Under-18 Championship
Silver medal – second place	2015 Greece	U18 team

Ömer Faruk Yurtseven (born 19 June 1998) is a Turkish professional basketball player for Rio Grande Valley Vipers of the NBA G League. He played college basketball for the NC State Wolfpack and Georgetown Hoyas. He plays the center position.

== Early life and career ==
He was born in Tashkent, Uzbekistan to Turkish parents and played basketball in Turkey and for the Turkish youth national team. He was selected to the Best Five of the 2014 FIBA Europe Under-16 Championship and was also invited to play at the Jordan Brand Classic International Game.

On 20 March 2015, Yurtseven made his EuroLeague debut, in a game against Emporio Armani Milano, scoring 2 points, in 1 minute and 4 seconds of playing time.

On 5 October 2015, Yurtseven played against the Brooklyn Nets, at the Barclays Center, in Brooklyn, New York. He had 8 points and 7 rebounds, with one block, in 15 minutes and 18 seconds of playing time, in his team's win over the Nets. He became the youngest player in history at the time to play in an NBA preseason game, at 17 years old.

During an under-18 youth age competition in Turkey, Yurtseven recorded a double-double, of 91 points (scoring more points than his entire competition), making 34 out of 49 shots (including five three-pointers), and grabbing 28 rebounds, in a 115–82 win over the youth club of Eylul Basketbol Ihtisas.

On 15 February 2016, he left Fenerbahçe, in order to play college basketball, stating that he needed more playing time than he was receiving with Fenerbahçe.

== College career ==
On 16 May 2016 it was announced that Yurtseven would be playing college basketball at North Carolina State University. However, due to his previous exposure with playing for Fenerbahçe, in some professional games, the NCAA decided to suspend him for the first nine games of their season (around 30% of the schedule), as well as require him to donate $1,000 to a charity of his choosing, in exchange for him to be fully eligible for playing time moving forward. After fulfilling his suspension, he returned to the court on December 15, in a win against Appalachian State University. On 14 March 2017, Yurtseven would test out his stock for the 2017 NBA draft, leaving open the possibility that he would return to North Carolina State for his sophomore season. After trying out for the 2017 NBA Draft Combine, his father announced he'd be going back to North Carolina State for his sophomore year.

During his sophomore year he would improve his points per game average from 5.9 to 13.5. This significant increase gained him All-ACC Third Team honors. On 21 March 2018, Yurtseven would test out going pro once again for the 2018 NBA draft. However, even if he stayed in college, he confirmed that he would not return to North Carolina State and would instead request a transfer to a different university.

On April 16, 2018, Yurtseven announced he would transfer to Georgetown. He became eligible to play for the Hoyas starting in the 2019–20 season with two years of eligibility remaining. Yurtseven had 20 points in his debut for Georgetown, an 81–68 win over Mount St. Mary's. He averaged 15.5 points and 9.8 rebounds per game but missed seven games with an ankle injury. On 28 April 2020, he announced that he was entering the 2020 NBA draft and was not returning to Georgetown.

== Professional career ==
=== Oklahoma City Blue (2021) ===
After going undrafted in the 2020 NBA draft, Yurtseven signed an Exhibit 10 deal with the Oklahoma City Thunder on 8 December 2020. He was waived next day. On January 28, 2021, Yurtseven was included in roster of the Oklahoma City Blue, the NBA G League affiliate of the Thunder.

=== Miami Heat (2021–2023) ===
On 14 May 2021, Yurtseven signed with the Miami Heat. On 1 August he joined the Heat for the NBA Summer League and five days later re-signed with the Heat. On 26 December, Yurtseven made his first career start, putting up 16 points and 15 rebounds in a 93–83 win over the Orlando Magic. On 15 November 2022, Yurtseven underwent surgery for an impingement, bone spur, and stress reaction in his left ankle.

Yurtseven played in the 2023 NBA Finals, with the Heat being the second #8 seed in NBA history to reach the NBA Finals. The Heat lost the Finals in 5 games to the Denver Nuggets.

=== Utah Jazz (2023–2024) ===
On 17 July 2023, Yurtseven signed with the Utah Jazz. However, he was waived on 1 July 2024.

=== Panathinaikos (2024–2026) ===
On 30 August 2024, Yurtseven signed a two-year (1+1) deal with the reigning EuroLeague and Greek League champions Panathinaikos. He joined head coach Ergin Ataman's roster, bringing NBA experience and size to strengthen Panathinaikos' frontcourt. During the 2024–25 EuroLeague season, Yurtseven had a standout performance in Round 19, recording 27 points, 7 rebounds, 2 assists and 3 blocks in a 111–90 win over Virtus Segafredo Bologna, earning the EuroLeague Round 19 MVP award. On 20 January 2025, Yurtseven suffered a right leg fracture during a Greek League derby against Olympiacos Piraeus, forcing him to miss 1–2 months of competition.

In the 2025–26 season, Yurtseven was ruled out with a second-degree adductor strain on 2 November 2025, an injury that was expected to keep him sidelined for approximately three weeks. On 28 February 2026, Panathinaikos exercised an opt-out clause in Yurtseven's contract, parting ways with the Turkish center. This roster move followed previous indications from head coach Ergin Ataman, who had hinted at potential frontcourt adjustments to accommodate the return of Mathias Lessort. With Lessort reintegrated into the rotation, Yurtseven was deemed surplus to the team’s immediate tactical requirements.

=== Rio Grande Valley Vipers (2026) ===
On 4 March 2026, Yurtseven signed with the Rio Grande Valley Vipers of the NBA G League.

=== Golden State Warriors (2026) ===
On 15 March 2026, Yurtseven signed a 10-day contract with the Golden State Warriors. On 25 March, Yurtseven re-signed with the Warriors on a second 10-day contract.

== National team career ==
Yurtseven was a member of the junior national teams of Turkey. With Turkey's junior national teams, he played at the 2013 FIBA Europe U16 Championship, and at the 2014 FIBA Europe U16 Championship, where he was named to the All-Tournament Team. He also played at the 2015 FIBA Europe U18 Championship, where he won a silver medal, and at the 2016 FIBA Europe U20 Championship, where he won a bronze medal, and was named to the All-Tournament Team. He finished his career with Turkey's junior national teams at the 2017 FIBA Europe U20 Championship.

== Career statistics ==
Legend
GP	Games played	GS	Games started	MPG	Minutes per game
FG%	Field goal percentage	3P%	3-point field goal percentage	FT%	Free throw percentage
RPG	Rebounds per game	APG	Assists per game	SPG	Steals per game
BPG	Blocks per game	PPG	Points per game	**Bold**	Career high

=== NBA ===
==== Regular season ====
Year	Team	GP	GS	MPG	FG%	3P%	FT%	RPG	APG	SPG	BPG	PPG
2021–22	Miami	**56**	**12**	**12.6**	.526	.091	.623	**5.3**	**.9**	**.3**	**.4**	**5.3**
2022–23	Miami	9	0	9.2	**.593**	**.429**	**.833**	2.6	.2	.2	.2	4.4
2023–24	Utah	48	**12**	11.4	.538	.208	.679	4.3	.6	.2	**.4**	4.6
2025–26	Golden State	9	0	11.6	.423	.000	.667	3.3	**.9**	.2	.1	3.8
Career		122	24	11.8	.529	.196	.655	4.5	.7	.2	.3	4.9

==== Playoffs ====
Year	Team	GP	GS	MPG	FG%	3P%	FT%	RPG	APG	SPG	BPG	PPG
2022	Miami	**9**	0	**4.2**	**.667**	.000	.333	**.8**	**.3**	.0	**.1**	**2.8**
2023	Miami	8	0	2.0	.286	.000	–	.6	.1	.0	**.1**	.5
Career		17	0	3.1	.560	.000	.333	.7	.2	.0	.1	1.7

=== College ===
Year	Team	GP	GS	MPG	FG%	3P%	FT%	RPG	APG	SPG	BPG	PPG
2016–17	NC State	22	14	18.9	.457	.333	.719	4.4	**1.2**	.2	.7	5.9
2017–18	NC State	**33**	22	23.8	**.572**	**.500**	.613	6.7	.5	**.5**	**1.8**	13.5
2018–19	Georgetown	Redshirt										
2019–20	Georgetown	26	**25**	**27.3**	.534	.214	**.753**	**9.8**	**1.2**	**.5**	1.5	**15.5**
Career		81	61	23.6	.539	.426	.693	7.1	.9	.4	1.4	12.1

=== EuroLeague ===
Year	Team	GP	GS	MPG	FG%	3P%	FT%	RPG	APG	SPG	BPG	PPG	PIR
2014–15	Fenerbahçe	3	0	1.3	1.0	.0	.0	.3	.3	.0	.0	.7	1.3
2015–16	Fenerbahçe	8	0	4.4	.417	**.500**	.0	.9	.0	.0	.1	1.6	.4
2024–25	Panathinaikos	**31**	**9**	**14.3**	.633	.400	.708	**4.0**	**.6**	**.4**	**.7**	**8.4**	**9.4**
2025–26	Panathinaikos	19	6	6.3	**.635**	.0	**.806**	3.5	**.6**	.4	.6	6.3	8.4
Career		61	15	12.0	.625	.417	.747	3.2	.5	.3	.6	6.5	7.5

== Personal life ==
Yurtseven likes playing chess and has named Magnus Carlsen as his favorite chess player.

== See also ==
- List of youngest EuroLeague players
