= Eduard Schmidt von der Launitz =

German sculptor (1797–1869)

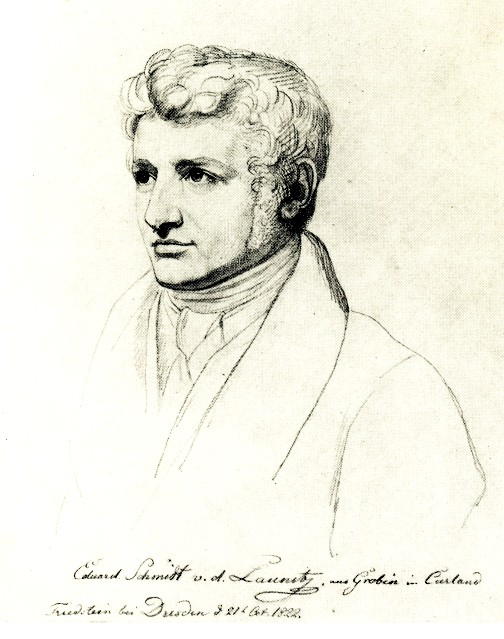
Eduard Schmidt von der Launitz (1822) by Carl Christian Vogel von Vogelstein

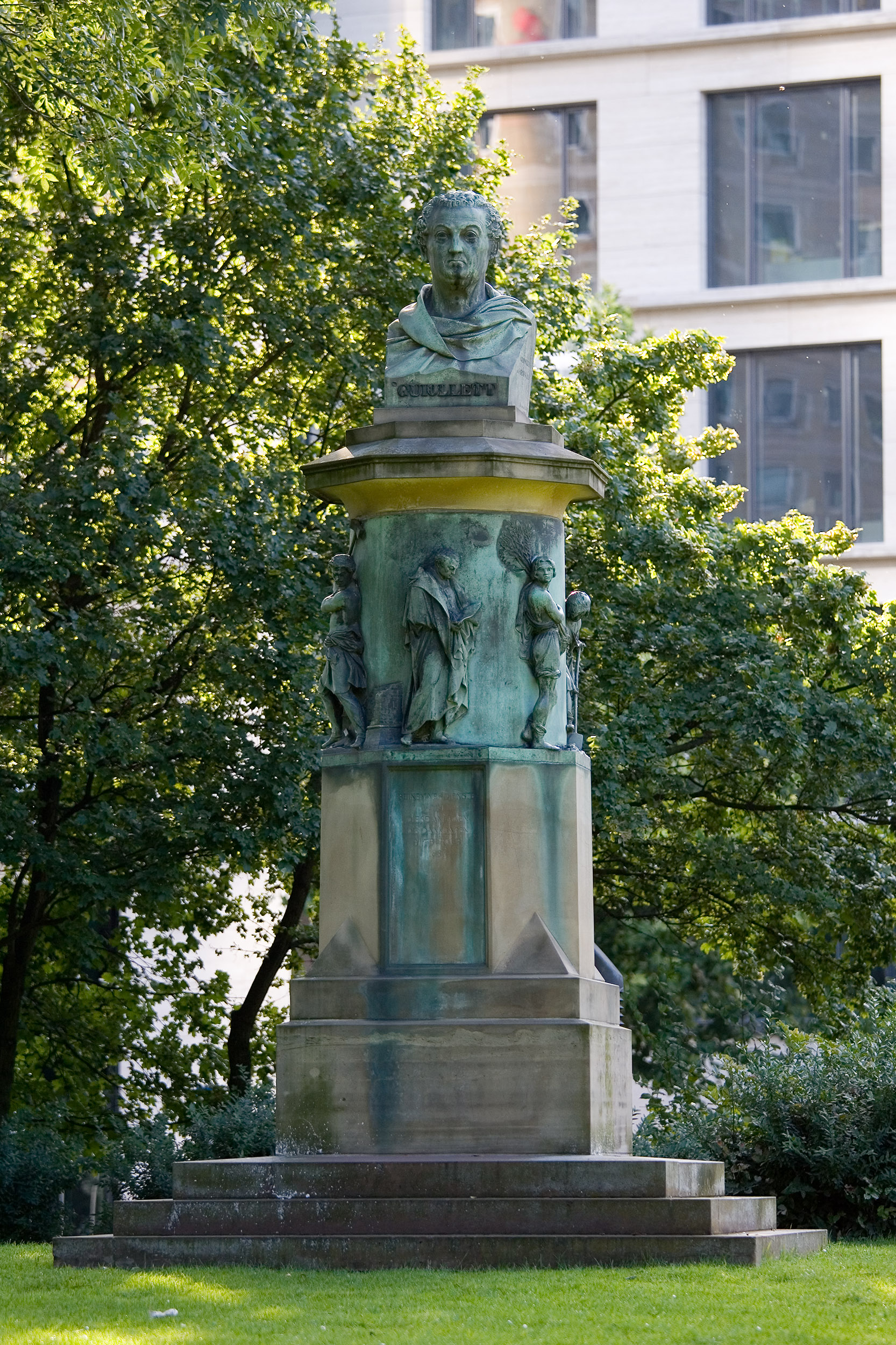
Memorial for Jakob Guiollett in Frankfurt

Nikolaus Karl Eduard Schmidt von der Launitz (born Nikolaus Karl Eduard Launitz; 23 November 1797 – 12 December 1869) was a German sculptor.

== Biography ==
Launitz was born a Baltic German in Grobin, Courland, which was then part of the Russian Empire. He was raised in Vechelde in the Duchy of Brunswick in 1809 after the death of his parents. In 1815 he began studying jurisprudence at the University of Göttingen. He became more interested in art, however, and visited an artists' colony in Rome. There he became a student of Bertel Thorvaldsen, whom he assisted in restoring the Æginetan marbles.

Schmidt von der Launitz spent most of his adult life in Frankfurt. He taught at the Städel in Frankfurt and the art academy in Düsseldorf. Schmidt von der Launitz is buried in the Hauptfriedhof Frankfurt. United States sculptor Robert Eberhard Launitz was his nephew.

== Work ==
Schmidt von der Launitz's first independent work was an 1820 relief of his brother, who had died during the Battle of Leipzig. In Frankfurt, he executed a Gutenberg monument and other notable works. For the Villa Torlonia in Rome, he made several statues, and other works of his are at the Hague.

== See also ==
- Johann Christian Gustav Lucae
