= Grobiņa =

Town and capital of South Kurzeme Municipality, Latvia

- Town
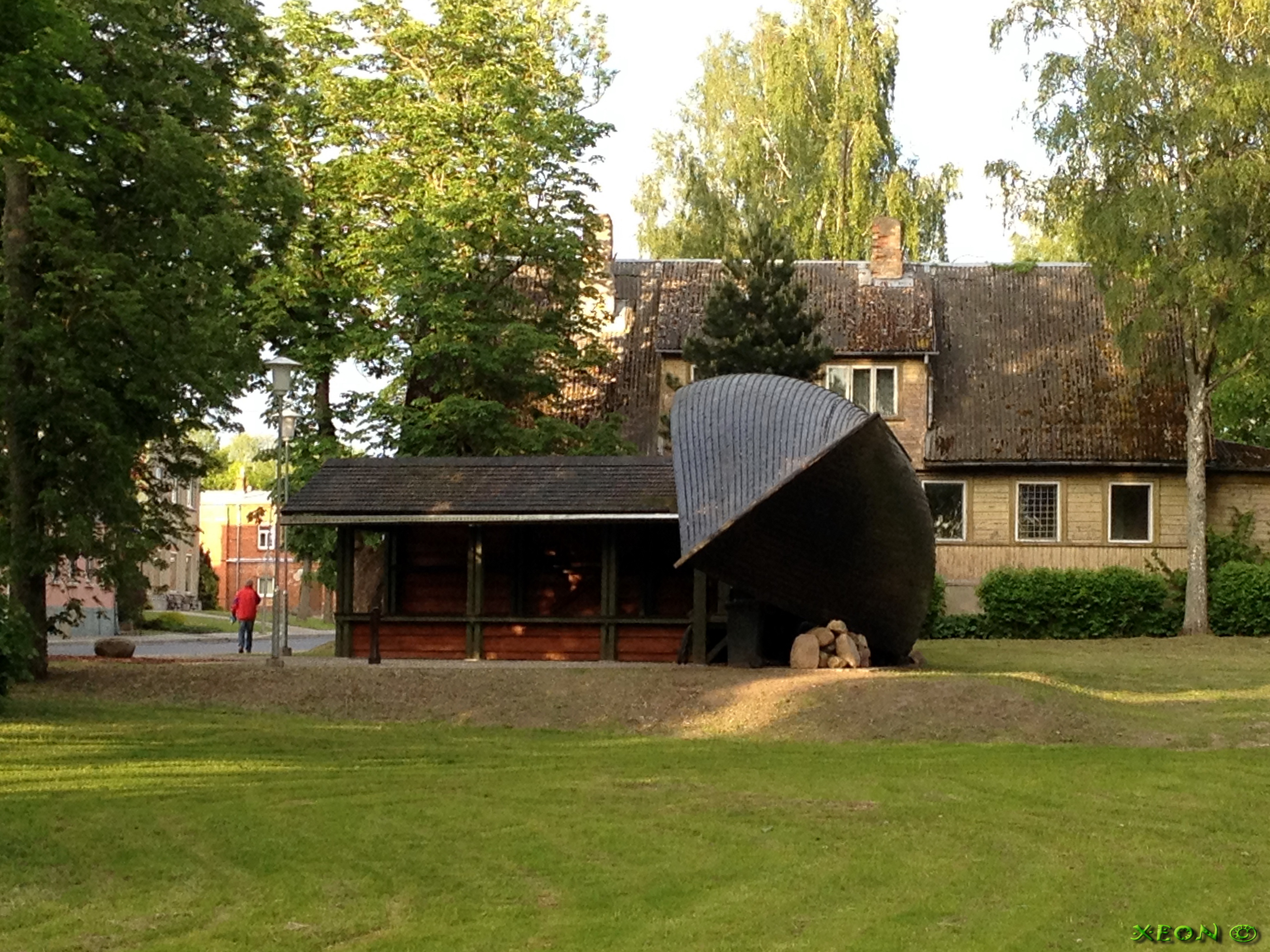

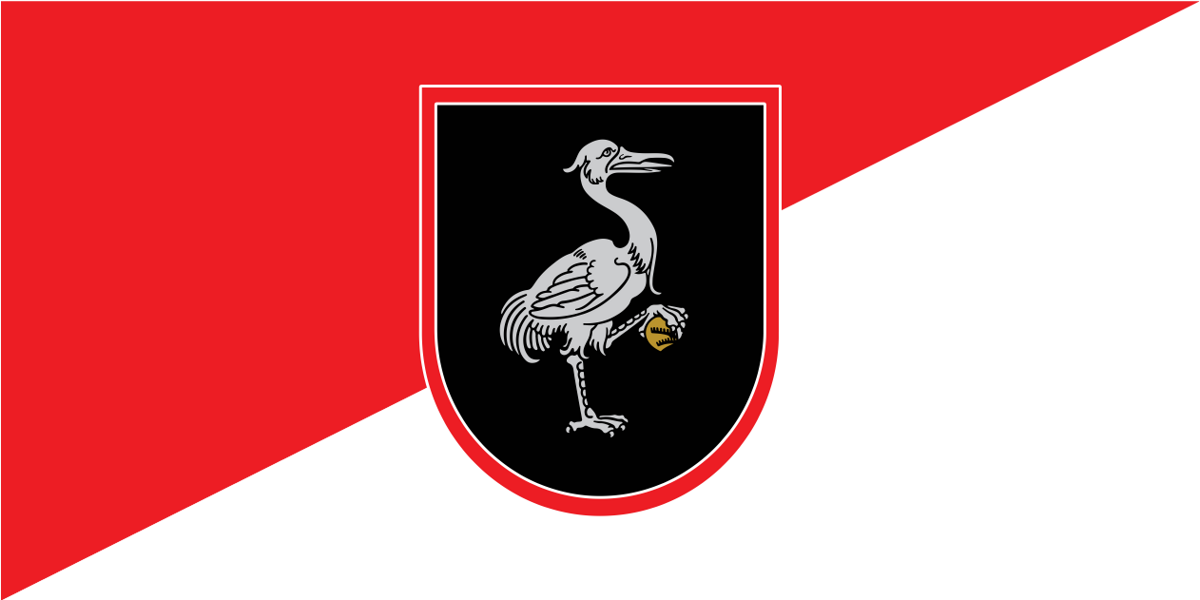
- Flag Coat of arms

- Location in Latvia
- Coordinates: 56°32′15″N 21°10′03″E
- Country: Latvia
- Municipality: South Kurzeme Municipality
- Town rights: 1695

Government
  - Mayor: Aivars Priedols

Area
  - Total: 5.12 km^{2} (1.98 sq mi)
  - Land: 4.93 km^{2} (1.90 sq mi)
  - Water: 0.19 km^{2} (0.073 sq mi)
- Elevation: 20 m (66 ft)

Population (2026)
  - Total: 3,686
  - Density: 748/km^{2} (1,940/sq mi)
- Time zone: UTC+2 (EET)
  - Summer (DST): UTC+3 (EEST)
- Postal code: LV-3430
- Calling code: +371 634
- Number of city council members: 9
- Website: www.grobina.lv

Grobiņa (German: Grobin) is a town and the administrative centre of South Kurzeme Municipality in the Courland region of Latvia, eleven kilometers east of Liepāja. It was founded by the Teutonic Knights in the 13th century. Some ruins of their Grobiņa Castle are still visible. The town was given its charter in 1695.

During the Early Middle Ages, Grobiņa (or Grobin) was the most important political centre on the territory of Latvia. There was a centre of Scandinavian settlement on the Baltic Sea, comparable in many ways to Hedeby and Birka but probably predating them both. About 3,000 surviving burial mounds contain the most impressive remains of the Vendel Age in Northern Europe.

== Scandinavian settlement ==
The settlement at Grobin was excavated by Birger Nerman in 1929 and 1930. Nerman found remains of an earthwork stronghold, which had been protected on three sides by the Ālande River. Three Vendel Age cemeteries may be dated to the period between 650 and 800 AD. One of them was military in character and analogous to similar cemeteries in the Mälaren Valley in Central Sweden, while two others indicate that there was "a community of Gotlanders who were carrying on peaceful pursuits behind the shield of the Swedish military". From Nerman's findings, it appears that Grobin was the site of an early Scandinavian colony from Gotland. Many of the graves in level ground were of women, who could be identified as natives of Gotland by their belt-buckles and brooches. The grave-mounds predominantly housed men, often accompanied by typical Scandinavian weaponry.

In one grave a picture-stone or stele depicting two duck-like birds was found in 1987. Such picture-stones are otherwise unique to Gotland. From its style it can be dated to the second half of 7th century. The weathered surface of one side contains refined carvings – inside the ring of ornaments there are two waterbirds; their beaks meet. Several hundreds of such picture stones (Swedish: bildsten) have been found in Gotland.

In the early years of the 9th century female graves at Grobin become scarce. Later graves are those of seafaring Scandinavian males.

=== Destruction ===
The Norsemen may have remained in control of Grobin until the mid-9th century, when – as Rimbert's Vita Ansgari relates – people inhabiting the Courland regions of Latvia rebelled after a long period as tributaries of Swedish rulers. In about 854 a fleet of Danes attempted to reimpose the tribute on their own behalf, but was defeated. Then Olof (I) of Sweden gathered an enormous army and tried to win back the former colony, in the process destroying a place that Rimbert calls Seeburg, usually identified as Grobin. Seeburg had 7,000 armed men to protect it, but the town was pillaged, ravaged, and burnt by the Swedes. The invaders sent back their ships and started out on a five-day expedition into the hinterland. They reached the town of Apulia (modern Apuolė, 40 kilometres (25 mi) to the southeast, in Lithuania) which had as many as 15,000 warriors. The town was besieged for eight days without apparent success and the Norsemen even appealed to the Christian God for help. When they were preparing for a decisive battle, the Curonians suddenly sued for peace, giving as booty weapons and gold captured by them from the Danes a year earlier.

Nerman's excavations at the ancient fort of Apulia corroborated the account of Vita Ansgari. He found evidence of a large-scale conflict in the 9th century, notably large concentrations of Swedish arrowheads near the walls of the derelict Curonian fortress.

== Sports ==
The city is home to the Latvian Higher League football club Grobiņas SC/LFS. However, due to the local stadium not meeting top-level specifications, the team and its fans travel to the Daugava Stadium in Liepāja for home games.

== Gallery ==
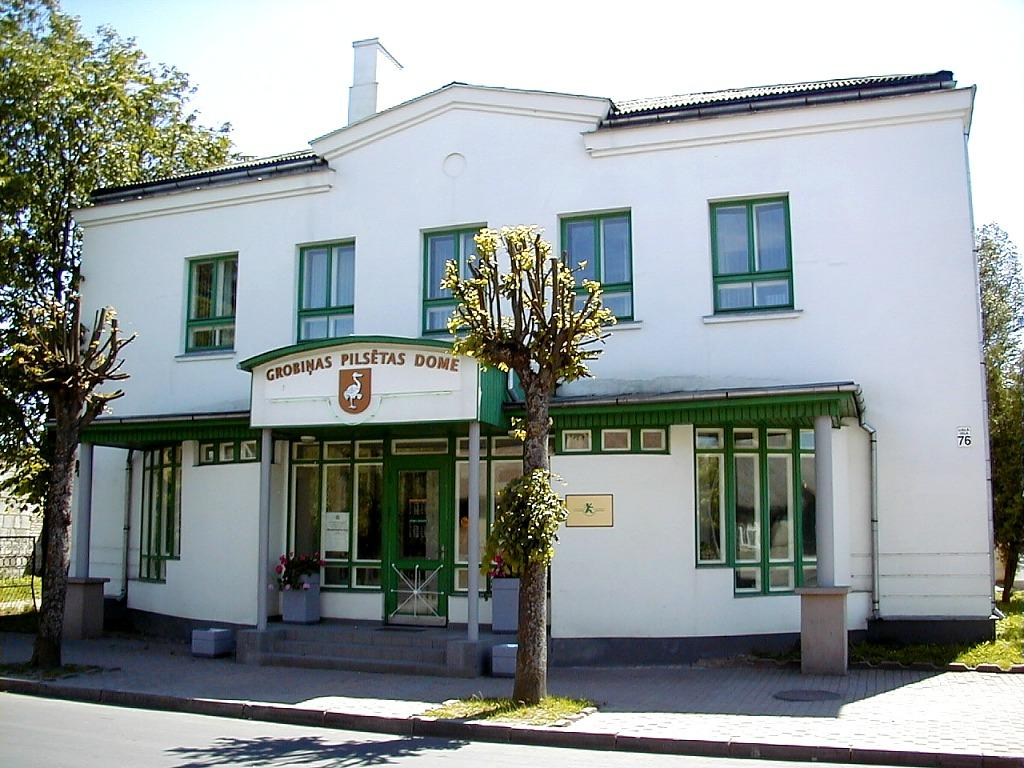
Grobiņa town hall

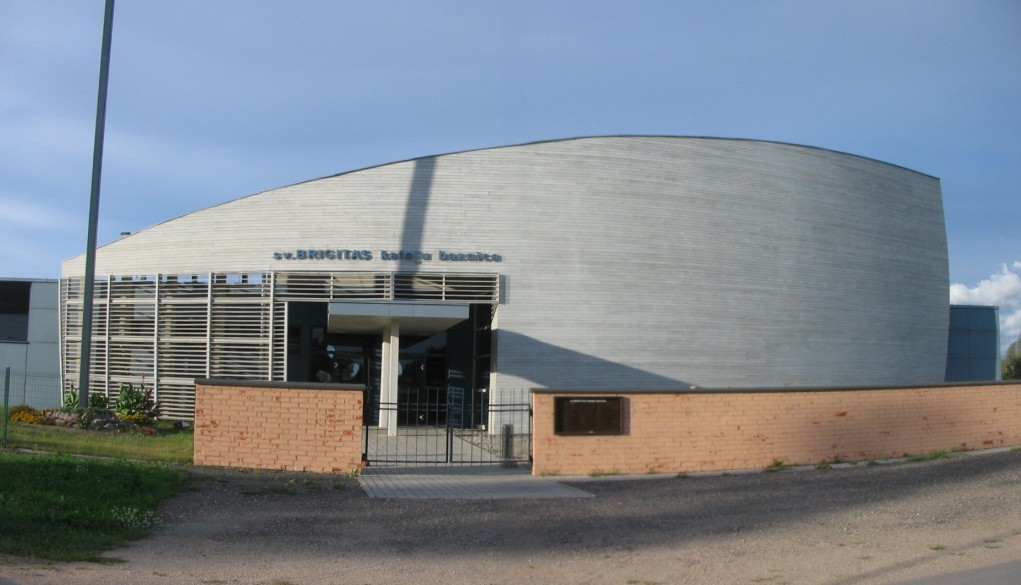
Saint Bridget Roman Catholic church in Grobiņa

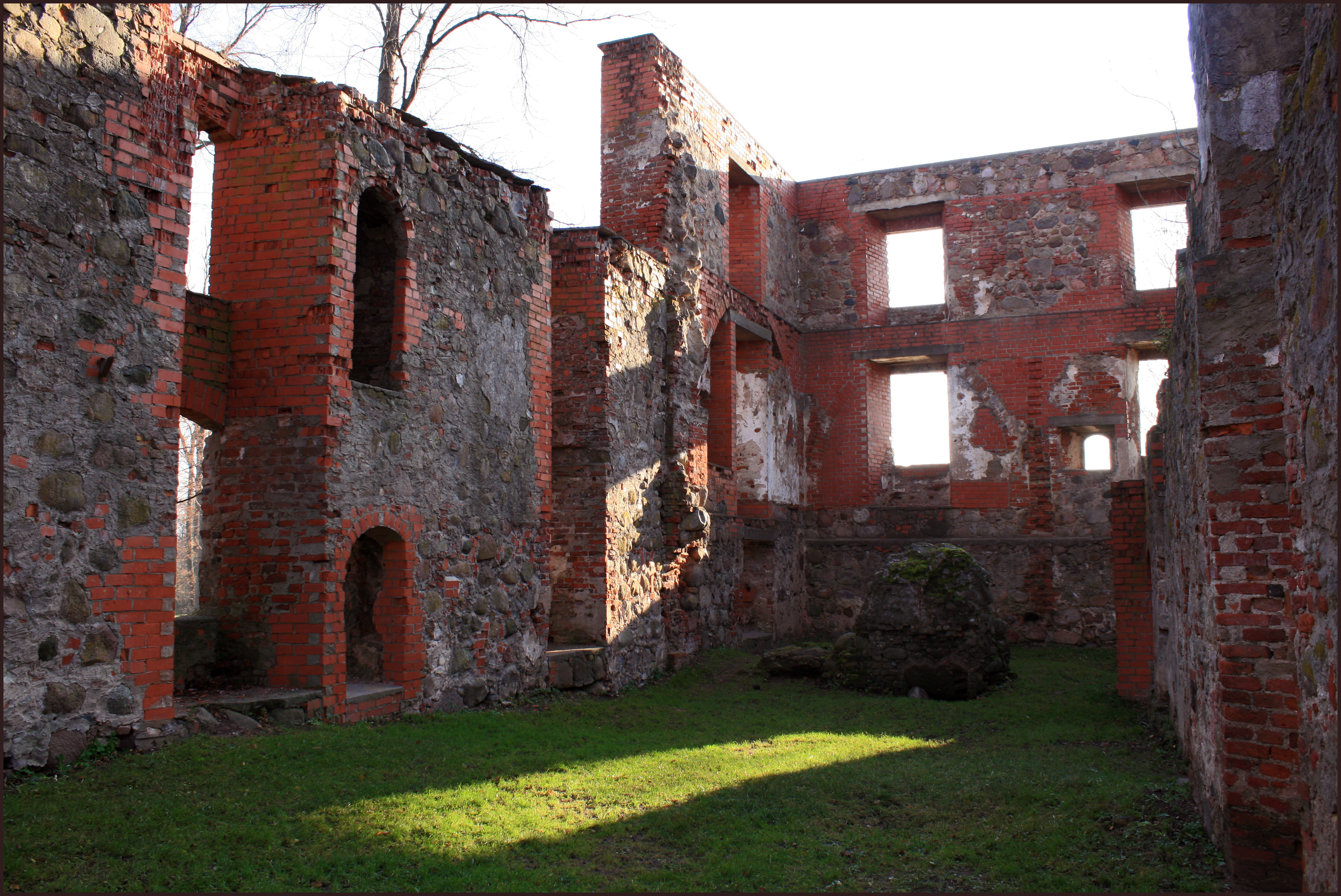
Grobiņa Castle ruins

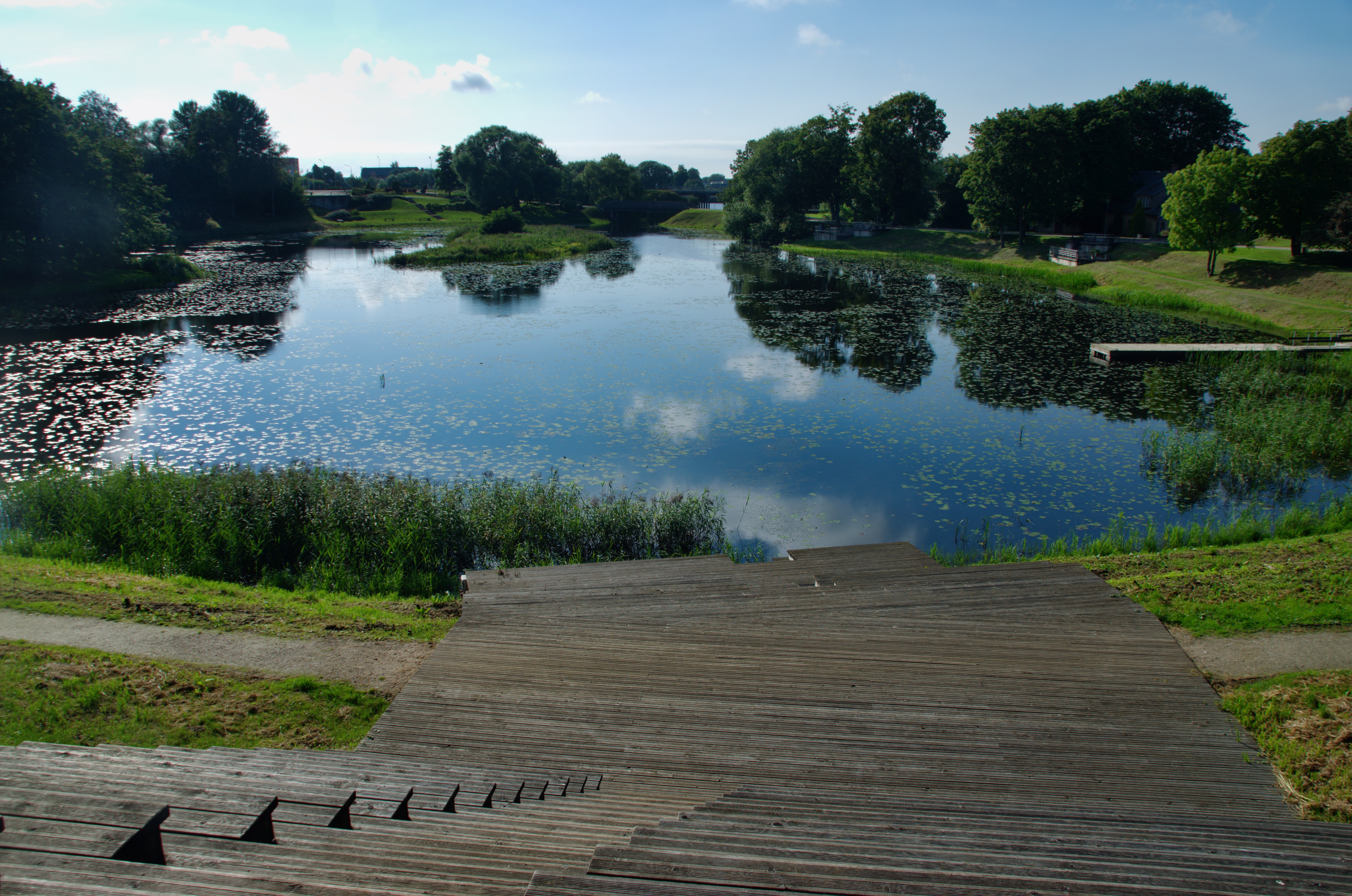
Alandė River from the ruins of Grobiņa Castle
