= 2012 FIBA Europe Under-18 Championship =

International basketball competition

2012 EuroBasket Under-18
29th FIBA Europe Under-18 Championship

Tournament details
- Host countries: Lithuania; Latvia
- Dates: 9 – 19 August 2012
- Teams: 16
- Venue(s): 3 (in 2 host cities)

Final positions
- Champions: Croatia (3rd title)

Tournament statistics
- MVP: (Croatia) Dario Šarić
- Top scorer: (Croatia) Šarić (25.6)
- Top rebounds: (France) Jaiteh (11.6)
- Top assists: (Bulgaria) Karamfilov (5.7)
- PPG (Team): Croatia (79.4)
- RPG (Team): Spain (44.3)
- APG (Team): Croatia (14.8)

Official website
- www.fibaeurope.com

The 2012 FIBA Europe Under-18 Championship was the 29th edition of the FIBA Europe Under-18 Championship. 16 teams featured the competition, held in Lithuania and Latvia from 9 to 19 August 2012. Spain were the defending champions. The top 5 teams qualify for the 2013 FIBA Under-19 World Championship.

== Participating teams ==
- Bulgaria ▲ (Winners, 2011 FIBA Europe Under-18 Championship Division B)
- Croatia
- Denmark ▲ (Runners-up, 2011 FIBA Europe Under-18 Championship Division B)
- France
- Germany
- Greece
- Italy
- Latvia
- Lithuania
- Poland
- Russia
- Serbia
- Slovenia
- Spain
- Turkey
- Ukraine

== Group stages ==
=== Preliminary round ===
In this round, the sixteen teams were allocated in four groups of four teams each. The top three advanced to the Qualifying Round. The last team of each group played for the 13th–16th place in the Classification Games.

Team advances to the Second Round
Team will compete in Classification Round

Times given below are in CEST (UTC+2).

==== Group A ====
Team	Pld	W	L	PF	PA	PD	Pts
Spain	3	3	0	253	202	+51	6
Serbia	3	2	1	226	191	+35	5
Ukraine	3	1	2	113	159	−46	4
Germany	3	0	3	129	169	−40	3

9 August 2012
13:30

Report

Ukraine	54–75	Serbia
Scoring by quarter: 8–21, 10–16, 19–12, 17–26
Pts: Sakhniuk 12; Rebs: Sakhniuk 5 Asts: Kozanchuk, Petrov 4		Pts: Radičević 18; Rebs: Janković 8 Asts: Radičević, Pot 3

Siemens Arena, Vilnius LTU
Attendance: 50
Referees: Regis Bardera (FRA), Marin Mehandjiev (BUL), Alexey Davydov (RUS)

9 August 2012
21:15

Report

Germany	75–86	Spain
Scoring by quarter: 25–20, 14–26, 11–16, 25–24
Pts: Schilling 16; Rebs: Zipser 7 Asts: Zipser 4		Pts: Hernangomez 14; Rebs: Hernangomez 9 Asts: Perez 7

Siemens Arena, Vilnius LTU
Attendance: 50
Referees: Mehmet Keseratar (TUR), Erez Gurion (ISR), Piotr Pastusiak (POL)

10 August 2012
16:45

Report

Spain	84–59	Ukraine
Scoring by quarter: 13–16, 28–21, 21–7, 22–15
Pts: Hernangomez 24; Rebs: Diop 12; Asts: Perez 6		Pts: Boyarkin 13; Rebs: Sakhniuk 8 Asts: Boyarkin 5

Siemens Arena, Vilnius LTU
Attendance: 100
Referees: Tomislav Vovk (CRO), Regis Bardera (FRA), Oskars Lucis (LAT)

10 August 2012
21:15

Report

Serbia	83–54	Germany
Scoring by quarter: 17–18, 27–20, 24–5, 15–11
Pts: Janković 16; Rebs: Ristić 17; Asts: Radičević, Pot 6		Pts: Akpinar 12; Rebs: Schilling, Thiemann 8 Asts: Marin 4

Siemens Arena, Vilnius LTU
Attendance: 50
Referees: Haydn Jones (WAL), Sašo Petek (SLO), Piotr Pastusiak (POL)

11 August 2012
16:45

Report

Ukraine	60–57	Germany
Scoring by quarter: 16–13, 8–16, 18–21, 18–7
Pts: Koreniuk 19; Rebs: five players 5 Asts: Boyarkin 8		Pts: Müller, Taylor 12; Rebs: Schilling, Thiemann 7 Asts: Taylor 3

Siemens Arena, Vilnius LTU
Attendance: 100
Referees: Marin Mehandjiev (BUL), Sašo Petek (SLO), Sean David Myers (AUS)

11 August 2012
21:15

Report

Spain	83–68	Serbia
Scoring by quarter: 23–14, 12–23, 31–10, 17–21
Pts: Perez 18; Rebs: Diop 11; Asts: Perez 6		Pts: Radičević 15; Rebs: Ristić 7 Asts: Radičević 6

Siemens Arena, Vilnius LTU
Attendance: 50
Referees: Mehmet Keseratar (TUR), Haydn Jones (WAL), Alexey Davydov (RUS)

==== Group B ====
Team	Pld	W	L	PF	PA	PD	Pts
Lithuania	3	3	0	244	200	+44	6
Italy	3	2	1	228	210	+18	5
Greece	3	1	2	196	197	−1	4
Denmark	3	0	3	181	242	−61	3

9 August 2012
15:45

Report

Denmark	63–86	Italy
Scoring by quarter: 11–26, 16–26, 14–21, 22–13
Pts: Moeller 13; Rebs: Mortensen, Christensen 4 Asts: Fabricius, Gertz 4		Pts: Turel, Fontecchio 14; Rebs: Imbrò 6 Asts: Imbrò 4

Siemens Arena, Vilnius LTU
Attendance: 60
Referees: Haydn Jones (WAL), Oskars Lucis (LAT), Sean David Myers (AUS)

9 August 2012
19:00

Report

Greece	66–71	Lithuania
Scoring by quarter: 18–15, 16–18, 16–21, 16–17
Pts: Agravanis 22; Rebs: Agravanis 12; Asts: Karamalegkos 4		Pts: Tamulis 27; Rebs: Krestinin 12; Asts: Gintvainis 5

Siemens Arena, Vilnius LTU
Attendance: 400
Referees: Tomislav Vovk (CRO), Bojan Jovanić (BIH), Sašo Petek (SLO)

10 August 2012
14:30

Report

Italy	71–66	Greece
Scoring by quarter: 15–15, 15–11, 20–9, 21–31
Pts: Imbrò 17; Rebs: Fontecchio 9 Asts: Imbrò 6		Pts: Bochoridis 14; Rebs: Agravanis 10; Asts: Karamalegkos 5

Siemens Arena, Vilnius LTU
Attendance: 60
Referees: Tomislav Vovk (CRO), Regis Bardera (FRA), Oskars Lucis (LAT)

10 August 2012
19:00

Report

Lithuania	92–63	Denmark
Scoring by quarter: 29–15, 19–19, 19–19, 25–10
Pts: Tamulis 16; Rebs: Raupys, Krestinin 10; Asts: Grigonis 6		Pts: Larsen 21; Rebs: Moeller, Jensen 6 Asts: Hansen, Moeller 3

Siemens Arena, Vilnius LTU
Attendance: 200
Referees: Marin Mehandjiev (BUL), Alexey Davydov (RUS), Sean David Myers (AUS)

11 August 2012
14:30

Report

Denmark	55–64	Greece
Scoring by quarter: 19–17, 6–15, 22–11, 8–21
Pts: Larsen 16; Rebs: Larsen 13; Asts: Hansen 4		Pts: Agravanis 18; Rebs: Kamperidis 11; Asts: Bochoridis 5

Siemens Arena, Vilnius LTU
Attendance: 60
Referees: Oskars Lucis (LAT), Erez Gurion (ISR), Bojan Jovanić (BIH)

11 August 2012
19:00

Report

Lithuania	81–71	Italy
Scoring by quarter: 24–23, 12–18, 26–12, 19–18
Pts: Tamulis 30; Rebs: Raupys 8 Asts: Gintvainis 6		Pts: Imbrò 24; Rebs: Bianchi 6 Asts: Fontecchio 3

Siemens Arena, Vilnius LTU
Attendance: 550
Referees: Regis Bardera (FRA), Tomislav Vovk (CRO), Piotr Pastusiak (POL)

==== Group C ====
Team	Pld	W	L	PF	PA	PD	Pts
Bulgaria	3	2	1	233	225	+8	5
Latvia	3	2	1	189	188	+1	5
Turkey	3	1	2	220	224	−4	4
France	3	1	2	188	193	−5	4

9 August 2012
16:15

Report

Bulgaria	95–89 (OT)	Turkey
Scoring by quarter: 23–13, 17–26, 20–10, 19–30, Overtime: 16–10
Pts: Vezenkov 28; Rebs: Vezenkov 8 Asts: Vezenkov 4		Pts: Erülkü 24; Rebs: Birsen 12; Asts: Sipahi 5

Liepāja Olympic Center, Liepāja LAT
Attendance: 200
Referees: Jose Martin (ESP), Sergiy Chaykovskyy (UKR), Alakbar Hasanov (AZE)

9 August 2012
18:45

Report

Latvia	58–54	France
Scoring by quarter: 14–10, 12–15, 17–14, 15–15
Pts: Geks 17; Rebs: Zvigurs 11; Asts: three players 2		Pts: Sene 13; Rebs: Jaiteh 9 Asts: Sene 5

Liepāja Olympic Center, Liepāja LAT
Attendance: 600
Referees: Petros Papapetrou (GRE), Moritz Reiter (GER), Ognjen Jokić (MNE)

10 August 2012
14:00

Report

France	78–69	Bulgaria
Scoring by quarter: 14–23, 11–14, 29–17, 24–15
Pts: Chassang, Labanca 21; Rebs: Jaiteh 13; Asts: Sene 6		Pts: Vezenkov 26; Rebs: Karamfilov 5 Asts: Karamfilov 5

Liepāja Olympic Center, Liepāja LAT
Attendance: 100
Referees: Aleksandar Glišić (SRB), Mindaugas Vecerskis (LTU), Miloš Koljenšić (MNE)

10 August 2012
18:30

Report

Turkey	65–73	Latvia
Scoring by quarter: 17–15, 13–21, 12–20, 23–17
Pts: Erülkü 15; Rebs: Kanter 8 Asts: Sipahi 4		Pts: Brizgalovs 16; Rebs: Gromovs 11; Asts: Leimanis 2

Liepāja Olympic Center, Liepāja LAT
Attendance: 500
Referees: Marco Giansanti (ITA), Haris Bijedić (BIH), Sergiy Chaykovskyy (UKR)

11 August 2012
14:00

Report

Turkey	66–56	France
Scoring by quarter: 15–11, 24–18, 16–16, 13–11
Pts: Sipahi, Osman 11; Rebs: Kanter 5 Asts: Sipahi 5		Pts: Sene 22; Rebs: Jaiteh 12; Asts: Sene 3

Liepāja Olympic Center, Liepāja LAT
Attendance: 100
Referees: Jose Martin (ESP), Ognjen Jokić (MNE), Miloš Koljenšić (MNE)

11 August 2012
18:30

Report

Latvia	58–69	Bulgaria
Scoring by quarter: 16–18, 13–23, 12–13, 17–15
Pts: Zvigurs 11; Rebs: Gromovs 7 Asts: three players 2		Pts: Vutev 18; Rebs: Vezenkov 11; Asts: Karamfilov 7

Liepāja Olympic Center, Liepāja LAT
Attendance: 600
Referees: Haris Bijedić (BIH), Petros Papapetrou (GRE), Ciprian Stoica (ROU)

==== Group D ====
Team	Pld	W	L	PF	PA	PD	Pts
Croatia	3	3	0	265	217	+48	6
Russia	3	2	1	202	197	+5	5
Slovenia	3	1	2	208	238	−30	4
Poland	3	0	3	201	224	−23	3

9 August 2012
14:00

Report

Poland	74–86	Croatia
Scoring by quarter: 14–19, 15–21, 20–23, 25–23
Pts: Witlinski 18; Rebs: Witlinski 8 Asts: Schenk 5		Pts: Šarić 29; Rebs: Lebo 8 Asts: Šarić 5

Liepāja Olympic Center, Liepāja LAT
Attendance: 100
Referees: Marco Giansanti (ITA), Mindaugas Vecerskis (LTU), Ciprian Stoica (ROU)

9 August 2012
21:00

Report

Slovenia	59–70	Russia
Scoring by quarter: 19–20, 18–20, 10–17, 12–13
Pts: Hrovat, Rebec 16; Rebs: Hrovat 7 Asts: Rebec 4		Pts: Kulagin 18; Rebs: Kulagin 10; Asts: Ilnitskiy 4

Liepāja Olympic Center, Liepāja LAT
Attendance: 100
Referees: Aleksandar Glišić (SRB), Haris Bijedić (BIH), Miloš Koljenšić (MNE)

10 August 2012
16:15

Report

Russia	69–64	Poland
Scoring by quarter: 17–14, 19–17, 18–14, 15–19
Pts: Kulagin 21; Rebs: Karenin, Kulagin 8 Asts: Annaev 5		Pts: Witlinski 20; Rebs: Borowski 9 Asts: Schenk 5

Liepāja Olympic Center, Liepāja LAT
Attendance: 150
Referees: Petros Papapetrou (GRE), Moritz Reiter (GER), Alakbar Hasanov (AZE)

10 August 2012
20:45

Report

Croatia	105–80	Slovenia
Scoring by quarter: 32–20, 23–25, 37–18, 13–17
Pts: Šarić 27; Rebs: Mustapić 7 Asts: Mavra 8		Pts: Rebec 15; Rebs: Ritlop, Hrovat 5 Asts: Nikolič 5

Liepāja Olympic Center, Liepāja LAT
Attendance: 100
Referees: Jose Martin (ESP), Ognjen Jokić (MNE), Ciprian Stoica (ROU)

11 August 2012
16:15

Report

Slovenia	69–63	Poland
Scoring by quarter: 13–23, 28–8, 14–17, 15–15
Pts: Bolcina 22; Rebs: Hrovat 9 Asts: Rebec 11		Pts: Radwanski 17; Rebs: Borowski 11; Asts: Schenk 3

Liepāja Olympic Center, Liepāja LAT
Attendance: 250
Referees: Marco Giansanti (ITA), Mindaugas Vecerskis (LTU), Alakbar Hasanov (AZE)

11 August 2012
20:45

Report

Croatia	74–63	Russia
Scoring by quarter: 19–21, 18–12, 20–14, 17–16
Pts: Šarić 32; Rebs: Šarić 13; Asts: Mavra 4		Pts: Kulagin 14; Rebs: Kulagin 7 Asts: Annaev 6

Liepāja Olympic Center, Liepāja LAT
Attendance: 400
Referees: Aleksandar Glišić (SRB), Moritz Reiter (GER), Sergiy Chaykovskyy (UKR)

=== Second round ===
The twelve teams remaining will be allocated in two groups of six teams each. The four top teams will advance to the quarterfinals. The last two teams of each group will play for the 9th–12th place.

Team advances to Quarterfinals
Team will compete in 9th–12th playoffs

==== Group E ====
Team	Pld	W	L	PF	PA	PD	Pts
Lithuania	5	5	0	375	320	+55	10
Spain	5	4	1	375	314	+61	9
Serbia	5	3	2	253	347	+6	8
Italy	5	2	3	355	354	+1	7
Greece	5	1	4	309	332	−23	6
Ukraine	5	0	5	275	375	−100	5

13 August 2012
16:45

Report

Greece	52–65	Spain
Scoring by quarter: 12–11, 15–17, 15–17, 10–20
Pts: Agravanis 13; Rebs: Mitsialos, Karamalegkos 5 Asts: Bochoridis, Angelou 2		Pts: Pauli 15; Rebs: Diaz 11; Asts: Diaz 5

Siemens Arena, Vilnius LTU
Attendance: 120
Referees: Tomislav Vovk (CRO), Marin Mehandjiev (BUL), Moritz Reiter (GER)

13 August 2012
19:00

Report

Lithuania	74–50	Ukraine
Scoring by quarter: 15–16, 20–12, 26–8, 13–14
Pts: Jankaitis 20; Rebs: Krestinin 12; Asts: Lekavicius 5		Pts: Sakhniuk, Koreniuk 12; Rebs: three players 8 Asts: six players 1

Siemens Arena, Vilnius LTU
Attendance: 400
Referees: Haydn Jones (WAL), Sašo Petek (SLO), Sean David Myers (AUS)

13 August 2012
21:15

Report

Italy	74–78	Serbia
Scoring by quarter: 17–19, 16–21, 14–22, 27–16
Pts: Laquintana 15; Rebs: Laquintana 12; Asts: Laquintana 5		Pts: Radičević 24; Rebs: Janković 12; Asts: three players 2

Siemens Arena, Vilnius LTU
Attendance: 200

14 August 2012
16:45

Report

Ukraine	61–66	Greece
Scoring by quarter: 14–16, 16–19, 13–13, 18–18
Pts: Sakhniuk 18; Rebs: Kharchynskyi, Sakhniuk 9 Asts: Kudrya 3		Pts: Agravanis 20; Rebs: three players 7 Asts: Bochoridis, Karamalegkos 3

Siemens Arena, Vilnius LTU
Attendance: 140
Referees: Regis Bardera (FRA), Moritz Reiter (GER), Piotr Pastusiak (POL)

14 August 2012
19:00

Report

Serbia	68–77	Lithuania
Scoring by quarter: 22–19, 14–16, 15–20, 17–22
Pts: Janković 18; Rebs: Pot 9 Asts: Radičević 6		Pts: Tamulis 18; Rebs: Krestinin 9 Asts: Grigonis 5

Siemens Arena, Vilnius LTU
Attendance: 1,400
Referees: Petros Papapetrou (GRE), Tomislav Vovk (CRO), Sean David Myers (AUS)

14 August 2012
21:15

Report

Spain	78–63	Italy
Scoring by quarter: 17–16, 21–23, 17–11, 23–13
Pts: Diop 14; Rebs: Siaz 9 Asts: Diaz 6		Pts: Fontecchio 15; Rebs: Candussi 6 Asts: Vencato, Laquintana 3

Siemens Arena, Vilnius LTU
Attendance: 300
Referees: Mehmet Keseratar (TUR), Bojan Jovanić (BIH), Sašo Petek (SLO)

15 August 2012
16:45

Report

Greece	59–64	Serbia
Scoring by quarter: 9–19, 17–17, 22–10, 11–18
Pts: Kamperidis 17; Rebs: Slaftsakis 8 Asts: Karamalegkos 4		Pts: Janković 20; Rebs: Janković 14; Asts: Radičević 8

Siemens Arena, Vilnius LTU
Attendance: 250

15 August 2012
19:00

Report

Lithuania	72–65	Spain
Scoring by quarter: 19–20, 16–11, 15–13, 22–21
Pts: Jankaitis 14; Rebs: Gustys 8 Asts: Lekavicius 4		Pts: Siaz, Pauli 12; Rebs: Siaz 8 Asts: Perez 5

Siemens Arena, Vilnius LTU
Attendance: 2,000

15 August 2012
21:15

Report

Italy	76–51	Ukraine
Scoring by quarter: 15–15, 27–15, 17–6, 17–15
Pts: Tessitori 18; Rebs: Tessitori 7 Asts: Imbrò, Procacci 3		Pts: Sakhniuk 18; Rebs: Sakhniuk 7 Asts: Boyarkin 3

Siemens Arena, Vilnius LTU
Attendance: 200

==== Group F ====
Team	Pld	W	L	PF	PA	PD	Pts	Tiebreaker
Croatia	5	4	1	404	351	+53	9	
Bulgaria	5	3	2	382	352	+30	8	1–1, +8
Russia	5	3	2	324	323	+1	8	1–1, −3
Latvia	5	3	2	324	340	−16	8	1–1, −5
Turkey	5	1	4	371	402	−31	6	1–0
Slovenia	5	1	4	368	405	−37	6	0–1

13 August 2012
16:45

Report

Slovenia	84–81	Bulgaria
Scoring by quarter: 24–23, 18–21, 13–15, 29–22
Pts: Hrovat 27; Rebs: Bolčina 8 Asts: Rebec 8		Pts: Vezenkov 31; Rebs: Karamfilov 6 Asts: Karamfilov 15

Liepāja Olympic Center, Liepāja LAT
Attendance: 180
Referees: Aleksandar Glišić (SRB), Miloš Koljenšić (MNE), Sergiy Chaykovskyy (UKR)

13 August 2012
19:00

Report

Russia	64–70	Latvia
Scoring by quarter: 17–16, 16–14, 15–27, 16–13
Pts: Kulagin 14; Rebs: Ilnitskiy 6 Asts: Annaev 6		Pts: Gromovs 11; Rebs: Gromovs 8 Asts: Leimanis 3

Liepāja Olympic Center, Liepāja LAT
Attendance: 1,100
Referees: Marco Giansanti (ITA), Mindaugas Vecerskis (LTU), Alakbar Hasanov (AZE)

13 August 2012
21:00

Report

Croatia	78–62	Turkey
Scoring by quarter: 11–19, 18–14, 17–9, 32–20
Pts: Šarić 26; Rebs: Šarić 10; Asts: Žganec 4		Pts: Yildizli 15; Rebs: Kanter, Yildizli 5 Asts: Erülkü, Özmizrak 3

Liepāja Olympic Center, Liepāja LAT
Attendance: 50
Referees: Jose Martin (ESP), Haris Bijedić (BIH), Ciprian Stoica (ROU)

14 August 2012
16:45

Report

Bulgaria	53–56	Russia
Scoring by quarter: 19–8, 9–18, 14–14, 11–16
Pts: Minkov 16; Rebs: Minkov 6 Asts: Karamfilov 2		Pts: Ilnitskiy 15; Rebs: Ilnitskiy 8 Asts: Annaev, Kashin 8

Liepāja Olympic Center, Liepāja LAT
Attendance: 200
Referees: Jose Martin (ESP), Haris Bijedić (BIH), Ciprian Stoica (ROU)

14 August 2012
19:00

Report

Latvia	62–82	Croatia
Scoring by quarter: 12–21, 11–19, 20–26, 19–16
Pts: Endzels 14; Rebs: Adins 6 Asts: Krastins, Endzels 3		Pts: Šarić 16; Rebs: Šarić 12; Asts: Šarić 5

Liepāja Olympic Center, Liepāja LAT
Attendance: 600
Referees: Marco Giansanti (ITA), Miloš Koljenšić (MNE), Sergiy Chaykovskyy (UKR)

14 August 2012
21:15

Report

Turkey	88–85	Slovenia
Scoring by quarter: 25–19, 21–27, 19–23, 23–16
Pts: Sipahi 35; Rebs: Yildizli 7 Asts: Sipahi 5		Pts: Hrovat 25; Rebs: Bolčina, Hrovat 5 Asts: Rebec 7

Liepāja Olympic Center, Liepāja LAT
Attendance: 150
Referees: Aleksandar Glišić (SRB), Mindaugas Vecerskis (LTU), Alakbar Hasanov (AZE)

15 August 2012
16:45

Report

Croatia	65–84	Bulgaria
Scoring by quarter: 18–27, 11–23, 18–20, 18–14
Pts: Mustapić 25; Rebs: Lebo 8 Asts: Gabrić 3		Pts: Vezenkov 17; Rebs: Mihaylov 8 Asts: Karamfilov 8

Liepāja Olympic Center, Liepāja LAT
Attendance: 200
Referees: Aleksandar Glišić (SRB), Mindaugas Vecerskis (LTU), Alakbar Hasanov (AZE)

15 August 2012
19:00

Report

Slovenia	60–61	Latvia
Scoring by quarter: 9–14, 16–24, 20–11, 15–12
Pts: Rebec 24; Rebs: Hrovat 6 Asts: Rebec 4		Pts: Geks 20; Rebs: Mateikovics 8 Asts: Leimanis 2

Liepāja Olympic Center, Liepāja LAT
Attendance: 400
Referees: Jose Martin (ESP), Miloš Koljenšić (MNE), Ciprian Stoica (ROU)

15 August 2012
21:15

Report

Russia	71–67	Turkey
Scoring by quarter: 18–19, 8–18, 21–17, 24–13
Pts: Alferov 17; Rebs: Ilnitskiy 8 Asts: Annaev 4		Pts: Yildizli 11; Rebs: Kanter 8 Asts: Sipahi 8

Liepāja Olympic Center, Liepāja LAT
Attendance: 200
Referees: Marco Giansanti (ITA), Haris Bijedić (BIH), Sergiy Chaykovskyy (UKR)

=== Classification round ===
The last teams of each group in the First Round will compete in this Classification Round. The four teams played in one group. The three teams will be relegated to Division B for the next season.

Team will be relegated to Division B.

==== Group G ====
Team	Pld	W	L	PF	PA	PD	Pts	Tiebreaker
France	6	5	1	416	356	+60	11	1–1, +3
Germany	6	5	1	421	346	+75	11	1–1, −3
Denmark	6	1	5	370	426	−56	7	1–1, +2
Poland	6	1	5	331	410	−79	7	1–1, −2

13 August 2012
16:30

Report

Germany	64–54	Poland
Scoring by quarter: 23–14, 14–20, 5–10, 22–10
Pts: Müller 11; Rebs: four players 6 Asts: five players 2		Pts: Garbacz 14; Rebs: Borowski 11; Asts: Schenk 6

Marciulonis Basketball Academy, Vilnius LTU
Attendance: 60
Referees: Mehmet Keseratar (TUR), Oskars Lucis (LAT), Alexey Davydov (RUS)

13 August 2012
18:45

Report

Denmark	61–67	France
Scoring by quarter: 24–14, 14–19, 7–16, 16–18
Pts: Larsen 22; Rebs: Larsen 10; Asts: Hansen 3		Pts: Sene 14; Rebs: Chassang 11; Asts: five players 1

Marciulonis Basketball Academy, Vilnius LTU
Attendance: 50
Referees: Bojan Jovanić (BIH), Ognjen Jokić (MNE), Erez Gurion (ISR)

14 August 2012
16:30

Report

France	57–51	Germany
Scoring by quarter: 12–20, 15–11, 18–9, 12–11
Pts: Harley, Jaiteh 18; Rebs: Jaiteh 11; Asts: four players 1		Pts: Schilling 11; Rebs: Lockhart 6 Asts: Lockhart 4

Marciulonis Basketball Academy, Vilnius LTU
Attendance: 70
Referees: Haydn Jones (WAL), Ognjen Jokić (MNE), Alexey Davydov (RUS)

14 August 2012
18:45

Report

Poland	52–59	Denmark
Scoring by quarter: 19–14, 18–8, 7–14, 8–23
Pts: Jeszke 11; Rebs: Jeszke 14; Asts: Radwanski 4		Pts: Larsen 20; Rebs: Larsen 13; Asts: Holm-Weber 3

Marciulonis Basketball Academy, Vilnius LTU
Attendance: 50
Referees: Oskars Lucis (LAT), Marin Mehandjiev (BUL), Erez Gurion (ISR)

15 August 2012
16:30

Report

Germany	75–61	Denmark
Scoring by quarter: 12–11, 26–17, 18–21, 19–12
Pts: Schilling 20; Rebs: Schilling 8 Asts: Taylor, Akpinar 5		Pts: Larsen 14; Rebs: Larsen 8 Asts: Holm-Weber 5

Marciulonis Basketball Academy, Vilnius LTU
Attendance: 100
Referees: Petros Papapetrou (GRE), Bojan Jovanić (BIH), Sean David Myers (AUS)

15 August 2012
18:45

Report

France	83–62	Poland
Scoring by quarter: 22–23, 18–22, 22–5, 21–12
Pts: Jaiteh 20; Rebs: Jaiteh 13; Asts: Sene 6		Pts: Jeszke 13; Rebs: Jeszke 5 Asts: Sanny, Patoka 2

Marciulonis Basketball Academy, Vilnius LTU
Attendance: 50
Referees: Tomislav Vovk (CRO), Marin Mehandjiev (BUL), Erez Gurion (ISR)

17 August 2012
14:30

Report

Poland	52–74	Germany
Scoring by quarter: 15–22, 20–12, 5–16, 12–24
Pts: Jeszke 13; Rebs: Witlinski 8 Asts: Dzierzak 6		Pts: Taylor 14; Rebs: Ugrai, Taylor 6 Asts: Zipser 5

Marciulonis Basketball Academy, Vilnius LTU
Attendance: 60
Referees: Haydn Jones (WAL), Ognjen Jokić (MNE), Sergiy Chaykovskyy (UKR)

17 August 2012
16:45

Report

France	76–70	Denmark
Scoring by quarter: 22–28, 18–16, 22–12, 14–14
Pts: Jaiteh 31; Rebs: Jaiteh 16; Asts: three players 3		Pts: Moeller 19; Rebs: Larsen 7 Asts: Knudsen, Gertz 2

Marciulonis Basketball Academy, Vilnius LTU
Attendance: 50
Referees: Aleksandar Glišić (SRB), Miloš Koljenšić (MNE), Ciprian Stoica (ROU)

18 August 2012
14:30

Report

Germany	60–57	France
Scoring by quarter: 23–10, 5–14, 8–15, 24–18
Pts: Zipser 18; Rebs: Müller 7 Asts: Akpinar 3		Pts: Sene 18; Rebs: Jaiteh 8 Asts: Sene 2

Marciulonis Basketball Academy, Vilnius LTU
Attendance: 70

18 August 2012
16:45

Report

Denmark	54–59	Poland
Scoring by quarter: 16–8, 9–23, 13–9, 16–19
Pts: Knudsen, Larsen 11; Rebs: Larsen 11; Asts: Holm-Weber 3		Pts: Radwanski 10; Rebs: Witlinski 7 Asts: Sanny 5

Marciulonis Basketball Academy, Vilnius LTU
Attendance: 100

19 August 2012
13:30

Report

Denmark	65–97	Germany
Scoring by quarter: 24–28, 10–33, 19–14, 12–22
Pts: Jensen 14; Rebs: Jensen 11; Asts: Holm-Weber 4		Pts: Marin 15; Rebs: Thiemann 10; Asts: Akpinar 6

Marciulonis Basketball Academy, Vilnius LTU
Attendance: 60

19 August 2012
15:45

Report

Poland	52–76	France
Scoring by quarter: 13–19, 16–19, 12–20, 11–18
Pts: Schenk 15; Rebs: Borowski, Schenk 5 Asts: Schenk 3		Pts: Jaiteh 18; Rebs: Jaiteh 13; Asts: Harley 4

Marciulonis Basketball Academy, Vilnius LTU
Attendance: 50

== Knockout round ==
=== Championship ===
Quarter-finals
August 17
Lithuania	65
Latvia	53
August 17
Bulgaria	79
Serbia	88
August 17
Croatia	76
Italy	69
August 17
Spain	56
Russia	58

Semi-finals
August 18
Lithuania	69
Serbia	67
August 18
Croatia	61
Russia	57

Final
August 19
Lithuania	76
Croatia	88
Third place
August 19
Serbia	66
Russia	56

=== 5th–8th playoffs ===
Semi-finals
August 18
Latvia	81
Bulgaria	64
August 18
Spain	70
Italy	63

Fifth place
August 19
Latvia	51
Spain	80
Seventh place
August 19
Bulgaria	65
Italy	84

=== 9th–12th playoffs ===
Semi-finals
August 17
Greece	73
Slovenia	78
August 17
Turkey	70
Ukraine	60

Ninth place
August 18
Slovenia	61
Turkey	81
Eleventh place
August 18
Greece	83
Ukraine	69

==== Classification 9–12 ====
17 August 2012
19:00

Report

Greece	73–78	Slovenia
Scoring by quarter: 17–19, 22–21, 14–23, 20–15
Pts: Slaftsakis 20; Rebs: Slaftsakis 8 Asts: Karamalegkos 4		Pts: Rebec 20; Rebs: Bolčina 8 Asts: Rebec 4

Marciulonis Basketball Academy, Vilnius LTU
Attendance: 50
Referees: Marco Giansanti (ITA), Mindaugas Vecerskis (LTU), Moritz Reiter (GER)

17 August 2012
21:15

Report

Turkey	70–60	Ukraine
Scoring by quarter: 14–13, 10–11, 21–17, 25–19
Pts: Kanter 14; Rebs: Birsen 9 Asts: Özmizrak 5		Pts: Sakhniuk 14; Rebs: Koreniuk 7 Asts: Kudrya 4

Marciulonis Basketball Academy, Vilnius LTU
Attendance: 50
Referees: Regis Bardera (FRA), Marin Mehandjiev (BUL), Oskars Lucis (LAT)

==== Quarterfinals ====
17 August 2012
14:30

Report

Spain	56–58	Russia
Scoring by quarter: 15–15, 8–14, 17–13, 16–16
Pts: Diaz, Hernangomez 18; Rebs: Diop Gaye 9 Asts: Diaz 2		Pts: Karenin, Kanygin 10; Rebs: Kulagin 9 Asts: Annaev, Kulagin 4

Siemens Arena, Vilnius LTU
Attendance: 250
Referees: Mehmet Keseratar (TUR), Piotr Pastusiak (POL), Sean David Myers (AUS)

17 August 2012
16:45

Report

Bulgaria	79–88	Serbia
Scoring by quarter: 15–20, 24–20, 21–26, 19–22
Pts: Vezenkov 6 Rebs: Karamfilov 5 Asts: Karamfilov 6		Pts: Pot 24; Rebs: Janković 10; Asts: Radičević 11

Siemens Arena, Vilnius LTU
Attendance: 300
Referees: Jose Martin (ESP), Haris Bijedić (BIH), Alakbar Hasanov (AZE)

17 August 2012
19:00

Report

Lithuania	65–53	Latvia
Scoring by quarter: 15–14, 15–12, 17–17, 18–10
Pts: Grigonis 16; Rebs: Krestinin 9 Asts: Lekavicius, Tamulis 4		Pts: Geks 12; Rebs: Gromovs 10; Asts: Endzels 3

Siemens Arena, Vilnius LTU
Attendance: 2,800
Referees: Tomislav Vovk (CRO), Bojan Jovanić (BIH), Alexey Davydov (RUS)

17 August 2012
21:15

Report

Croatia	76–69	Italy
Scoring by quarter: 20–19, 15–9, 22–13, 19–28
Pts: Mustapić 16; Rebs: Žganec 11; Asts: Mavra 6		Pts: Fontecchio 17; Rebs: Pipitone 10; Asts: Imbrò 4

Siemens Arena, Vilnius LTU
Attendance: 250
Referees: Petros Papapetrou (GRE), Sašo Petek (SLO), Erez Gurion (ISR)

==== 11th-place game ====
18 August 2012
19:00

Report

Greece	83–69	Ukraine
Scoring by quarter: 18–20, 22–20, 24–15, 19–14
Pts: Slaftsakis, Agravanis 17; Rebs: Agravanis 9 Asts: Bochoridis 5		Pts: Sakhniuk 13; Rebs: Zagreba, Shevchenko 5 Asts: three players 3

Marciulonis Basketball Academy, Vilnius LTU
Attendance: 50

==== 9th-place game ====
18 August 2012
21:15

Report

Slovenia	61–81	Turkey
Scoring by quarter: 17–19, 18–19, 9–29, 17–14
Pts: Rebec 16; Rebs: Bolčina 10; Asts: Rebec 6		Pts: Sipahi 18; Rebs: Altunbey 7 Asts: Sipahi 11

Marciulonis Basketball Academy, Vilnius LTU
Attendance: 50

==== Classification 5–8 ====
18 August 2012
14:30

Report

Latvia	81–64	Bulgaria
Scoring by quarter: 24–16, 12–21, 26–18, 19–9
Pts: Stelmahers 16; Rebs: Zvigurs 8 Asts: Stelmahers, Leimanis 3		Pts: Minkov 14; Rebs: Vezenkov 9 Asts: Karamfilov 4

Siemens Arena, Vilnius LTU
Attendance: 100

18 August 2012
16:45

Report

Spain	70–63	Italy
Scoring by quarter: 16–25, 21–5, 19–18, 14–15
Pts: Pauli 19; Rebs: Diop Gaye, Hernangomez 7 Asts: Perez 3		Pts: Tessitori 20; Rebs: Pipitone 11; Asts: Imbrò, Procacci 3

Siemens Arena, Vilnius LTU
Attendance: 300

==== Semifinals ====
18 August 2012
19:00

Report

Lithuania	69–67	Serbia
Scoring by quarter: 21–15, 17–20, 14–16, 17–16
Pts: Raupys 18; Rebs: Jankaitis 8 Asts: Galeckas 3		Pts: Anđušić, Janković 17; Rebs: Janković 13; Asts: Pot 3

Siemens Arena, Vilnius LTU
Attendance: 3,000
Referees: Marco Giansanti (ITA), Petros Papapetrou (GRE), Moritz Reiter (GER)

18 August 2012
21:15

Report

Russia	57–61	Croatia
Scoring by quarter: 11–15, 24–9, 12–18, 10–19
Pts: Kulagin 15; Rebs: Kulagin 13; Asts: Annaev 7		Pts: Šarić 24; Rebs: Šarić 13; Asts: Šarić 3

Siemens Arena, Vilnius LTU
Attendance: 1,000
Referees: Regis Bardera (FRA), Haydn Jones (WAL), Miloš Koljenšić (MNE)

==== 7th-place game ====
19 August 2012
13:30

Report

Bulgaria	65–84	Italy
Scoring by quarter: 13–25, 12–20, 19–23, 21–16
Pts: Minkov 15; Rebs: four players 3 Asts: Karamfilov, Yankov 2		Pts: Tessitori 28; Rebs: three players 4 Asts: Imbrò 6

Siemens Arena, Vilnius LTU
Attendance: 100

==== 5th-place game ====
19 August 2012
15:45

Report

Latvia	51–80	Spain
Scoring by quarter: 5–12, 12–31, 14–17, 20–20
Pts: Endzels 11; Rebs: Zvigurs 4 Asts: three players 2		Pts: Diop Gaye 16; Rebs: three players 6 Asts: Diaz, Perez 4

Siemens Arena, Vilnius LTU
Attendance: 150

==== Bronze-medal game ====
19 August 2012
18:00

Report

Serbia	66–56	Russia
Scoring by quarter: 20–20, 15–13, 17–12, 14–11
Pts: Pot 21; Rebs: Čvorović 8 Asts: Rebić 4		Pts: Kanygin 12; Rebs: Kulagin 11; Asts: Annaev 4

Siemens Arena, Vilnius LTU
Attendance: 3,000
Referees: Tomislav Vovk (CRO), Sašo Petek (SLO), Alakbar Hasanov (AZE)

==== Final ====
19 August 2012
20:15

Report

Lithuania	76–88	Croatia
Scoring by quarter: 15–22, 18–14, 20–22, 23–30
Pts: Grigonis 17; Rebs: two players with 6 Asts: two players with 3		Pts: Šarić 39; Rebs: Šarić 11; Asts: two players with 5

Siemens Arena, Vilnius LTU
Attendance: 7000
Referees: Jose Martin (ESP), Aleksandar Glišić (SRB), Alexey Davydov (RUS)

== Final standings ==
Rank	Team
1st place, gold medalist(s)	Croatia
2nd place, silver medalist(s)	Lithuania
3rd place, bronze medalist(s)	Serbia
4th	Russia
5th	Spain
6th	Latvia
7th	Italy
8th	Bulgaria
9th	Turkey
10th	Slovenia
11th	Greece
12th	Ukraine
13th	France
14th	Germany
15th	Denmark
16th	Poland

2012 FIBA Europe Under-18 Championship winners

Croatia
Third title

Team qualified for the 2013 FIBA Under-19 World Championship
Team relegated to 2013 Division B

== Awards ==
Most Valuable Player
(Croatia) Dario Šarić

All-Tournament Team

- (Lithuania) Marius Grigonis
- (Croatia) Dario Šarić
- (Serbia) Nikola Janković
- (Serbia) Nikola Radičević
- (Russia) Mikhail Kulagin
