= 2012 DBB Albert Schweitzer Tournament =

Tournament details
- Host country: Germany
- Dates: 7–14 April 2012
- Teams: 16 (from 4 federations)
- Venues: 2 (in 2 host cities)

Final positions
- Champions: Spain (2nd title)

Tournament statistics
- MVP: (Serbia) Nikola Radičević

Official website
- Albert Schweitzer Tournament 2016

The 2012 DBB Albert Schweitzer Tournament was the 26th edition of the DBB Albert Schweitzer Tournament. 16 teams featured the competition, held in Mannheim and Viernheim from April 7–14.

== Group stages ==
=== First round ===
In this round, the 16 teams were allocated in four groups of four teams each. The top three advanced to the Second Round. The last two teams of each group played in the Classification Games.

Team advances to the Second Round
Team will compete in Classification Games for 9th – 16th place

==== Group A ====
Team	Pld	W	L	PF	PA	PD	Pts
Italy	3	3	0	259	197	+62	6
France	3	2	1	227	212	+15	5
Israel	3	1	2	189	234	−45	4
Argentina	3	0	3	200	232	−32	3

7 April 2012
12:45

Report

Israel	61–81	Italy
Scoring by quarter: 21–19, 9–22, 16–20, 15–20
Pts: Ohanon 11; Rebs: Solomon 7 Asts: Menco 3		Pts: Tessitori 17; Rebs: Candussi 9 Asts: Bianchi, Imbro 4

MWS Halle, Mannheim
Attendance: 250
Referees: Nikola Perlić (CRO), George Poursanidis (GRE), Maciej Nazimek (IRL)

7 April 2012
17:00

Report

France	70–68	Argentina
Scoring by quarter: 18–23, 19–14, 12–8, 21–23
Pts: Dallo 15; Rebs: Jaiteh 13; Asts: Michineau, Plas 2		Pts: Massone 21; Rebs: Barroso 6 Asts: Whelan 6

MWS Halle, Mannheim
Attendance: 500
Referees: Carlos Peruga (ESP), Wojciech Liszka (POL), Jelena Panić (SRB)

8 April 2012
14:00

Report

Israel	67–61	Argentina
Scoring by quarter: 13–14, 16–12, 23–20, 15–15
Pts: Sealine 21; Rebs: Ohanon 7 Asts: Ben Aliza 2		Pts: Torres 18; Rebs: Torres 10; Asts: Barral 4

MWS Halle, Mannheim
Attendance: 75
Referees: Sergey Belyakov (RUS), Mila Cavara (BIH), Enrion Hoxhay (ALB)

8 April 2012
18:00

Report

France	65–83	Italy
Scoring by quarter: 15–22, 17–20, 18–22, 15–19
Pts: Jaiteh 15; Rebs: Jaiteh 7 Asts: three players 3		Pts: Turel 20; Rebs: Imbro 10; Asts: Imbro 9

MWS Halle, Mannheim
Referees: Miroslav Kaluderovic (MNE), Maciej Nazimek (IRL), Mariann Miklosik (SCO)

9 April 2012
14:00

Report

Israel	61–92	France
Scoring by quarter: 17–19, 17–24, 11–26, 16–23
Pts: Solomon 11; Rebs: Menco 7 Asts: Zalz 2		Pts: Racine 25; Rebs: Jaiteh 11; Asts: three players 3

MWS Halle, Mannheim
Attendance: 300
Referees: Carlos Peruga (ESP), Ventsislav Velikov (BUL), Mila Cavara (BIH)

9 April 2012
18:00

Report

Italy	95–71	Argentina
Scoring by quarter: 29–23, 21–20, 23–10, 22–18
Pts: Fontecchio, Tessitori 18; Rebs: Tessitori 10; Asts: Imbro 5		Pts: Massone 16; Rebs: González, Saiz 5 Asts: Barral 5

MWS Halle, Mannheim
Referees: George Poursanidis (GRE), Marek Kukelcik (SVK), Kate Webb (ENG)

==== Group B ====
Team	Pld	W	L	PF	PA	PD	Pts
Germany	3	3	0	213	171	+42	6
Turkey	3	2	1	219	194	+25	5
Sweden	3	1	2	200	199	+1	4
New Zealand	3	0	3	188	256	−68	3

7 April 2012
14:45

Report

Turkey	72–63	Sweden
Scoring by quarter: 23–13, 17–21, 19–18, 13–11
Pts: Birsen 18; Rebs: Yıldızlı 8 Asts: Alp 4		Pts: N. Larsson 16; Rebs: A. Larsson 12; Asts: Gorski 2

MWS Halle, Mannheim
Attendance: 400
Referees: Sergey Belyakov (RUS), Marek Kukelcik (SVK), Sonia Teixeira (POR)

7 April 2012
20:00

Report

Germany	86–57	New Zealand
Scoring by quarter: 10–17, 36–6, 12–20, 28–14
Pts: Akpinar, Zipser 20; Rebs: Zipser 9 Asts: Bryant 5		Pts: Webster 22; Rebs: Talma 10; Asts: six players 1

MWS Halle, Mannheim
Attendance: 1,000
Referees: Viliua Maciulaitis (LTU), Stanislav Kucera (CZE), Adrada Csender (ROU)

8 April 2012
16:00

Report

New Zealand	70–96	Turkey
Scoring by quarter: 18–23, 16–27, 13–17, 23–29
Pts: Vodanovich 23; Rebs: Vodanovich 6 Asts: Young, Lacey 2		Pts: Erülkü 26; Rebs: Türen 7 Asts: Erülkü, Birsen 6

MWS Halle, Mannheim
Referees: Stanislav Kucera (CZE), Andrei Sharapa (BLR), Kate Webb (ENG)

8 April 2012
20:00

Report

Germany	66–63	Sweden
Scoring by quarter: 27–14, 8–13, 13–20, 18–16
Pts: Zipser 17; Rebs: Müller 9 Asts: three players 2		Pts: N. Larsson, Hakanson 12; Rebs: Jädersten 5 Asts: Magnusson 4

MWS Halle, Mannheim
Referees: Carlos Peruga (ESP), George Poursanidis (GRE), Sebastian Kwisda (AUT)

9 April 2012
16:00

Report

Sweden	74–61	New Zealand
Scoring by quarter: 20–17, 12–16, 25–18, 17–10
Pts: Hakanson 20; Rebs: Bergäng 6 Asts: Magnusson 7		Pts: Kelly 16; Rebs: Vodanovich 9 Asts: Te Rangi 4

MWS Halle, Mannheim
Attendance: 800
Referees: Sergey Belyakov (RUS), Jelena Panic (SRB), Enrion Hoxhay (ALB)

9 April 2012
20:00

Report

Germany	61–51	Turkey
Scoring by quarter: 15–10, 14–16, 19–8, 13–17
Pts: Zipser 19; Rebs: Diouf 14; Asts: Lockhart, Marin 2		Pts: Altunbey 13; Rebs: Birsen 13; Asts: Birsen 3

MWS Halle, Mannheim
Referees: Nikola Perlic (CRO), Andrada Csender (ROU), Sebastian Kwisda (AUT)

==== Group C ====
Team	Pld	W	L	PF	PA	PD	Pts
Spain	3	3	0	244	179	+65	6
Russia	3	2	1	202	196	+6	5
Australia	3	1	2	194	208	−14	4
China	3	0	3	188	245	−57	3

7 April 2012
12:30

Report

Spain	88–56	China
Scoring by quarter: 16–14, 22–12, 23–7, 27–23
Pts: Hernangómez 15; Rebs: Hernangómez 12; Asts: Pérez 4		Pts: Yu 15; Rebs: Zhao, Zhou 7 Asts: Lai 2

Waldsporthalle, Viernheim
Attendance: 250
Referees: Tamas Benczur (HUN), Erman Erdemli (TUR), Marko Vladic (AUT)

7 April 2012
16:30

Report

Australia	57–59	Russia
Scoring by quarter: 7–11, 20–18, 10–15, 20–15
Pts: Naar 17; Rebs: Rowley 9 Asts: Naar 3		Pts: Kulagin 22; Rebs: Kanygin 13; Asts: Annaev 5

Waldsporthalle, Viernheim
Referees: Miroslav Kaluderovic (MNE), Dariusz Zapolski (POL), Andrei Sharapa (BLR)

8 April 2012
14:00

Report

Russia	66–78	Spain
Scoring by quarter: 21–24, 18–15, 10–16, 17–23
Pts: Ilnitskiy 17; Rebs: Kanygin 7 Asts: Annaev 8		Pts: Hernangómez 24; Rebs: Hernangómez 13; Asts: Marín 5

Waldsporthalle, Viernheim
Attendance: 300
Referees: Nikola Perlic (CRO), Konstantin Simonov (GER), Volodymyr Pediev (UKR)

8 April 2012
18:00

Report

Australia	80–71	China
Scoring by quarter: 12–21, 19–26, 25–13, 24–11
Pts: Fisher 23; Rebs: Rowley 12; Asts: Naar 5		Pts: Zhou 13; Rebs: Zhou 7 Asts: Zhao 6

Waldsporthalle, Viernheim
Referees: Mario Majkic (SLO), Jean-Charles Collin (FRA), Adrada Csender (ROU)

9 April 2012
14:00

Report

China	61–77	Russia
Scoring by quarter: 13–18, 15–17, 19–20, 14–22
Pts: Zhao 22; Rebs: Liu 6 Asts: Zhao 3		Pts: Kulagin 23; Rebs: Kanygin 10; Asts: Krechetov 6

Waldsporthalle, Viernheim
Referees: Vilius Maciulaitis (LTU), Erman Erdemli (TUR), Sonia Teixeira (POR)

9 April 2012
18:00

Report

Spain	78–57	Australia
Scoring by quarter: 22–11, 20–9, 19–20, 17–17
Pts: Saiz 15; Rebs: Saiz 10; Asts: Pérez 4		Pts: Fisher 14; Rebs: Oswald, Pineau 5 Asts: Naar 3

Waldsporthalle, Viernheim
Referees: Dariusz Zapolski (POL), Amit Balak (ISR), Andrei Sharapa (BLR)

==== Group D ====
Team	Pld	W	L	PF	PA	PD	Pts
Serbia	3	3	0	227	169	+58	6
United States	3	2	1	221	208	+13	5
Greece	3	1	2	176	204	−28	4
Denmark	3	0	3	167	210	−43	3

7 April 2012
14:30

Report

Serbia	75–46	Denmark
Scoring by quarter: 23–8, 16–14, 26–14, 10–10
Pts: Milutinov 12; Rebs: Milutinov 6 Asts: Rebic 4		Pts: Møller 10; Rebs: Christensen 7 Asts: five players 1

Waldsporthalle, Viernheim
Attendance: 350
Referees: Jean-Charles Collin (FRA), Mario Majkic (SLO), Anne Panther (GER)

7 April 2012
20:30

Report

United States	76–63	Greece
Scoring by quarter: 14–24, 17–11, 24–11, 21–17
Pts: Hicks 20; Rebs: Nichols, Willis 7 Asts: Walton 3		Pts: Agravanis 15; Rebs: Aggelou, Agravanis 8 Asts: Bochoridis 5

Waldsporthalle, Viernheim
Referees: Konstantin Simonov (GER), Ventsislav Velikov (BUL), Volodymyr Pediev (UKR)

8 April 2012
16:00

Report

Greece	55–74	Serbia
Scoring by quarter: 18–17, 8–25, 10–16, 19–16
Pts: Aggelou, Agravanis 13; Rebs: Agravanis 4 Asts: Bochoridis 3		Pts: Guduric, Milutinov 16; Rebs: Milutinov 8 Asts: Radicevic 5

Waldsporthalle, Viernheim
Attendance: 1,000
Referees: Vilius Maciulaitis (LTU), Tamas Benczur (HUN), Wojciech Liszka (POL)

8 April 2012
20:00

Report

United States	77–67	Denmark
Scoring by quarter: 25–15, 21–17, 17–18, 14–17
Pts: Clark, Hicks 17; Rebs: Clark 10; Asts: Clark 10		Pts: Larsen 24; Rebs: Larsen 11; Asts: Larsen 3

Waldsporthalle, Viernheim
Attendance: 500
Referees: Dariusz Zapolski (POL), Amit Balak (ISR), Erman Erdemli (TUR)

9 April 2012
16:00

Report

Greece	58–54	Denmark
Scoring by quarter: 17–13, 10–8, 24–16, 7–17
Pts: Bochoridis 22; Rebs: Agravanis 11; Asts: Bochoridis 3		Pts: Møller 26; Rebs: Christensen 9 Asts: Larsen 2

Waldsporthalle, Viernheim
Attendance: 300
Referees: Jean-Charles Collin (FRA), Mariann Miklosik (SCO), Marko Vladic (AUT)

9 April 2012
20:00

Report

United States	68–78	Serbia
Scoring by quarter: 21–17, 15–19, 17–21, 15–21
Pts: Clark 19; Rebs: Clark 8 Asts: Hicks 3		Pts: Andric 23; Rebs: Andric 9 Asts: Radicevic 4

Waldsporthalle, Viernheim
Attendance: 900
Referees: Tamas Benczur (HUN), Anne Panther (GER), Mario Majkic (SLO)

=== Second round ===
Team advances to the Knockout round

==== Group E ====
Team	Pld	W	L	PF	PA	PD	Pts
Germany	3	3	0	218	200	+18	6
Turkey	3	1	2	216	213	+3	4
Italy	3	1	2	245	247	−2	4
France	3	1	2	204	223	−19	4

11 April 2012
18:00

Report

Turkey	91–77	Italy
Scoring by quarter: 17–27, 29–29, 22–9, 23–12
Pts: Osman 20; Rebs: Birsen 8 Asts: three players 3		Pts: Imbro 18; Rebs: Bianchi 9 Asts: Imbro 10

MWS Halle, Mannheim
Attendance: 800
Referees: Dariusz Zapolski (POL), Mila Cavara (BIH), Stanislav Kucera (CZE)

11 April 2012
20:00

Report

Germany	66–64	France
Scoring by quarter: 15–11, 17–17, 24–20, 10–16
Pts: three players 11; Rebs: Diouf 10; Asts: Zipser, Müller 3		Pts: Chassang 15; Rebs: Dallo 7 Asts: Dallo 4

MWS Halle, Mannheim
Attendance: 600
Referees: Tamas Benczur (HUN), Sergey Belyakov (RUS), Jelena Panic (SRB)

12 April 2012
18:00

Report

France	75–74	Turkey
Scoring by quarter: 23–19, 9–19, 22–23, 21–13
Pts: Jaiteh 18; Rebs: Jaiteh 8 Asts: Dallo, Couzigou 4		Pts: Osman 19; Rebs: Altunbey 5 Asts: Erülkü 4

MWS Halle, Mannheim
Attendance: 1,500
Referees: George Poursanidis (GRE), Amit Balak (ISR), Ventsislav Velikov (BUL)

12 April 2012
20:00

Report

Italy	85–91 (OT)	Germany
Scoring by quarter: 22–16, 18–13, 19–18, 12–24, Overtime: 14–20
Pts: Turel 17; Rebs: Pipitone 7 Asts: Imbro 7		Pts: Zipser 20; Rebs: Schilling 12; Asts: Zipser 5

MWS Halle, Mannheim
Referees: Andrei Sharapa (BLR), Wojciech Liszka (POL), Kate Webb (ENG)

==== Group F ====
Team	Pld	W	L	PF	PA	PD	Pts
Spain	3	3	0	218	194	+24	6
Serbia	3	2	1	200	190	+10	5
Russia	3	1	2	228	221	+7	4
United States	3	0	3	217	258	−41	3

11 April 2012
18:00

Report

Serbia	65–64	Russia
Scoring by quarter: 8–14, 17–18, 21–13, 19–19
Pts: Radicevic 22; Rebs: Milutinov 11; Asts: Andusic 2		Pts: Ilnitskiy 19; Rebs: Annaev, Gankevich 5 Asts: Annaev 6

Waldsporthalle, Viernheim
Attendance: 300
Referees: George Poursanidis (GRE), Wojciech Liszka (POL), Sonia Teixeira (POR)

11 April 2012
20:00

Report

United States	81–92	Spain
Scoring by quarter: 13–25, 14–24, 29–23, 25–20
Pts: Clark 25; Rebs: Willis 5 Asts: Walton, Willis 5		Pts: Diop 18; Rebs: Hernangómez 12; Asts: Pérez 5

Waldsporthalle, Viernheim
Attendance: 250
Referees: Miroslav Kaluderovic (MNE), Marek Kukelcik (SVK), Mariann Miklosik (SCO)

12 April 2012
18:00

Report

Russia	98–78	United States
Scoring by quarter: 16–13, 27–20, 27–25, 28–20
Pts: Kanygin 23; Rebs: Kulagin 10; Asts: Annaev, Ilnitskiy 5		Pts: Clark 38; Rebs: Smith, Willis 5 Asts: Clark 4

Waldsporthalle, Viernheim
Attendance: 450
Referees: Carlos Peruga (ESP), Erman Erdemli (TUR), Sonia Teixeira (POR)

12 April 2012
20:00

Report

Spain	58–57	Serbia
Scoring by quarter: 17–18, 14–7, 8–18, 19–14
Pts: Saiz 12; Rebs: Diop 7 Asts: Marín, Homs 2		Pts: Radicevic 17; Rebs: Milutinov 12; Asts: Radicevic 3

Waldsporthalle, Viernheim
Attendance: 450
Referees: Dariusz Zapolski (POL), Anne Panther (GER), Stanislav Kucera (CZE)

=== Classification Games for 9th – 16th place ===
==== Group G ====
Team	Pld	W	L	PF	PA	PD	Pts
Israel	3	3	0	245	189	+56	6
Sweden	3	2	1	207	205	+2	5
Argentina	3	1	2	189	184	+5	4
New Zealand	3	0	3	173	236	−63	3

11 April 2012
14:00

Report

Sweden	71–66	Argentina
Scoring by quarter: 29–14, 16–14, 11–15, 15–23
Pts: Hakanson 27; Rebs: N. Larsson 7 Asts: Magnusson, N. Larsson 3		Pts: González 16; Rebs: Torres 8 Asts: Whelan 5

MWS Halle, Mannheim
Attendance: 100
Referees: Carlos Peruga (ESP), Anne Panther (GER), Volodymyr Pediev (UKR)

11 April 2012
16:00

Report

New Zealand	66–100	Israel
Scoring by quarter: 18–30, 12–23, 21–16, 15–31
Pts: Webster 19; Rebs: Sorenson 7 Asts: Soonalole 2		Pts: Solomon 20; Rebs: Solomon 13; Asts: Menco 6

MWS Halle, Mannheim
Attendance: 200
Referees: Mario Majkic (SLO), Konstantin Simonov (GER), Kate Webb (ENG)

12 April 2012
14:00

Report

Argentina	62–46	New Zealand
Scoring by quarter: 18–16, 18–11, 20–14, 6–5
Pts: Massone, Torres 10; Rebs: Torres 8 Asts: Araujo 5		Pts: Sorenson 9 Rebs: Talma, Rangi 8 Asts: Webster 3

MWS Halle, Mannheim
Attendance: 100
Referees: Jean-Charles Collin (FRA), Andrada Csender (ROU), Marko Vladic (AUT)

12 April 2012
16:00

Report

Israel	78–62	Sweden
Scoring by quarter: 21–21, 17–14, 20–7, 20–20
Pts: Solomon 24; Rebs: Solomon 15; Asts: Sharon, Menco 5		Pts: Magnusson 11; Rebs: Hakanson, Löfberg 8 Asts: Hakanson 3

MWS Halle, Mannheim
Attendance: 600
Referees: Nikola Perlic (CRO), Enrion Hoxhay (ALB), Maciej Nazimek (IRL)

==== Group H ====
Team	Pld	W	L	PF	PA	PD	Pts
Australia	3	3	0	240	193	+47	6
China	3	2	1	217	205	+12	5
Greece	3	1	2	192	213	−21	4
Denmark	3	0	3	167	205	−38	3

11 April 2012
14:00

Report

Greece	59–72	China
Scoring by quarter: 22–21, 16–20, 13–18, 8–13
Pts: Bochoridis 17; Rebs: three players 7 Asts: Bochoridis 5		Pts: Zhou 30; Rebs: Liu 12; Asts: Zhao, Yu 6

Waldsporthalle, Viernheim
Attendance: 250
Referees: Andrei Sharapa (BLR), Amit Balak (ISR), Enrion Hoxhay (ALB)

11 April 2012
16:00

Report

Denmark	42–73	Australia
Scoring by quarter: 13–11, 14–23, 6–31, 9–8
Pts: Møller 12; Rebs: Christensen, Jensen 6 Asts: Møller 3		Pts: Lopez 16; Rebs: Pineau 10; Asts: Naar 4

Waldsporthalle, Viernheim
Attendance: 250
Referees: Nikola Perlic (CRO), Maciej Nazimek (IRL), Marko Vladic (AUT)

12 April 2012
14:00

Report

China	74–66	Denmark
Scoring by quarter: 22–9, 19–22, 15–17, 18–18
Pts: Zhao 16; Rebs: Zhou 9 Asts: Zhao 5		Pts: Larsen 27; Rebs: Larsen 15; Asts: Møller 3

Waldsporthalle, Viernheim
Attendance: 100
Referees: Konstantin Simonov (GER), Mila Cavara (BIH), Vilius Maciulaitis (LTU)

12 April 2012
16:00

Report

Australia	87–75	Greece
Scoring by quarter: 19–20, 18–22, 33–15, 17–18
Pts: Lopez 20; Rebs: Pineau 9 Asts: Naar 7		Pts: Bochoridis 25; Rebs: Agravanis 9 Asts: Mitsialos, Agravanis 4

Waldsporthalle, Viernheim
Attendance: 200
Referees: Miroslav Kaluderovic (MNE), Volodymyr Pediev (UKR), Sebastian Kwisda (AUT)

== Knockout round ==
=== Championship ===
Semi-finals
13 April 2012
Spain	90
Turkey	76
13 April 2012
Serbia	68
Germany	58

Final
14 April 2012
Spain	76
Serbia	65
Third place
14 April 2012
Turkey	90
Germany	85

=== 15th place game ===
13 April 2012
10:00

Report

New Zealand	62–81	Denmark
Scoring by quarter: 16–18, 11–11, 15–23, 20–29
Pts: Vodanovich 16; Rebs: Soonalole 5 Asts: Webster 4		Pts: Møller 21; Rebs: Christensen 5 Asts: Møller 5

MWS Halle, Mannheim
Referees: Sergey Belyakov (RUS), Tamas Benczur (HUN), Mariann Miklosik (SCO)

=== 13th place game ===
13 April 2012
12:00

Report

Argentina	55–42	Greece
Scoring by quarter: 7–10, 16–17, 17–9, 15–6
Pts: Chávez 19; Rebs: Tognon 5 Asts: Whelan 4		Pts: Agravanis 13; Rebs: Mitsialos, Agravanis 8 Asts: Tsontzos 2

MWS Halle, Mannheim
Attendance: 200
Referees: Dariusz Zapolski (POL), Jelena Panic (SRB), Ventsislav Velikov (BUL)

=== 11th place game ===
13 April 2012
14:00

Report

Sweden	63–78	China
Scoring by quarter: 19–30, 17–20, 11–14, 16–14
Pts: N. Larsson 20; Rebs: Gorski 9 Asts: N. Larsson 6		Pts: Luo 16; Rebs: Zhou 8 Asts: Zhao 7

MWS Halle, Mannheim
Attendance: 700
Referees: Anne Panther (GER), Amit Balak (ISR), Marek Kukelcik (SVK)

=== 9th place game ===
13 April 2012
16:00

Report

Israel	67–83	Australia
Scoring by quarter: 17–13, 25–14, 14–30, 11–26
Pts: Solomon 19; Rebs: Solomon 9 Asts: Sharon 7		Pts: Naar 22; Rebs: Pineau 15; Asts: Naar 3

MWS Halle, Mannheim
Attendance: 1,000
Referees: Konstantin Simonov (GER), Sebastian Kwisda (AUT), Jean-Charles Collin (FRA)

=== Semifinals ===
13 April 2012
18:30

Report

Turkey	76–90	Spain
Scoring by quarter: 24–25, 15–21, 18–18, 19–26
Pts: Yıldız 23; Rebs: Birsen 10; Asts: Yıldız 4		Pts: Pérez 26; Rebs: Saiz 10; Asts: Marín 7

MWS Halle, Mannheim
Attendance: 1,500
Referees: Nikola Perlic (CRO), Mario Majkic (SLO), Adrada Csender (ROU)

13 April 2012
20:30

Report

Germany	58–68	Serbia
Scoring by quarter: 10–21, 10–15, 16–15, 22–17
Pts: three players 11; Rebs: three players 4 Asts: three players 2		Pts: Radicevic 22; Rebs: Ristic 7 Asts: Radicevic 5

MWS Halle, Mannheim
Attendance: 2,000
Referees: George Poursanidis (GRE), Vilius Maciulaitis (LTU), Sonia Teixeira (POR)

=== 7th place game ===
14 April 2012
9:00

Report

France	81–87	United States
Scoring by quarter: 17–19, 26–29, 14–19, 24–20
Pts: Jaiteh 25; Rebs: Jaiteh 14; Asts: Jaiteh 6		Pts: Walton 20; Rebs: Willis 7 Asts: Walton 3

MWS Halle, Mannheim
Attendance: 800
Referees: Sergey Belyakov (RUS), Erman Erdemli (TUR), Enrion Hoxhay (ALB)

=== 5th place game ===
14 April 2012
11:00

Report

Italy	69–68	Russia
Scoring by quarter: 13–20, 20–23, 23–10, 13–15
Pts: Turel 20; Rebs: Fontecchio 6 Asts: Imbro 5		Pts: Ilnitskiy 19; Rebs: Kulagin 10; Asts: Kulagin 5

MWS Halle, Mannheim
Attendance: 1,000
Referees: Konstantin Simonov (GER), Wojciech Liszka (POL), Jelena Panic (SRB)

=== Bronze medal game ===
14 April 2012
14:00

Report

Germany	85–90	Turkey
Scoring by quarter: 23–21, 22–17, 20–17, 20–35
Pts: Lockhart, Schilling 15; Rebs: Lockhart, Schilling 7 Asts: three players 4		Pts: Erülkü 24; Rebs: Yıldız 7 Asts: five players 2

MWS Halle, Mannheim
Attendance: 2,200
Referees: Carlos Peruga (ESP), Milosav Kaluderovic (MNE), Jean-Charles Collin (FRA)

=== Final ===
14 April 2012
16:15

Report

Spain	76–65	Serbia
Scoring by quarter: 22–17, 15–18, 25–13, 14–17
Pts: Homs 18; Rebs: Diop 9 Asts: Homs 3		Pts: Radicevic 19; Rebs: Ristic 11; Asts: Guduric 4

MWS Halle, Mannheim
Attendance: 2,200
Referees: Dariusz Zapolski (POL), Andrei Sharapa (BLR), Stanislav Kucera (CZE)

== Final standings ==
Rank	Team	Record
Gold medal	Spain	7–0
Silver medal	Serbia	5–2
Bronze medal	Turkey	4–3
4th	Germany	5–2
5th	Italy	4–2
6th	Russia	3–3
7th	United States	3–3
8th	France	3–3
9th	Australia	4–2
10th	Israel	3–3
11th	China	3–3
12th	Sweden	2–4
13th	Argentina	2–4
14th	Greece	1–5
15th	Denmark	1–5
16th	New Zealand	0–6

== Awards ==
Albert Schweitzer Tournament winner

Spain
Second title

Most Valuable Player
(Serbia) Nikola Radičević

Most Talented Player
(Turkey) Cedi Osman

All-Tournament Team

- (Serbia) Nikola Radičević
- (Spain) Josep Pérez
- (Germany) Paul Zipser
- (Serbia) Mihajlo Andrić
- (Spain) Willy Hernangómez
