= Ioannis Karamalegkos =

Greek basketball player

Ioannis Karamalegkos Γιάννης Καραμαλέγκος
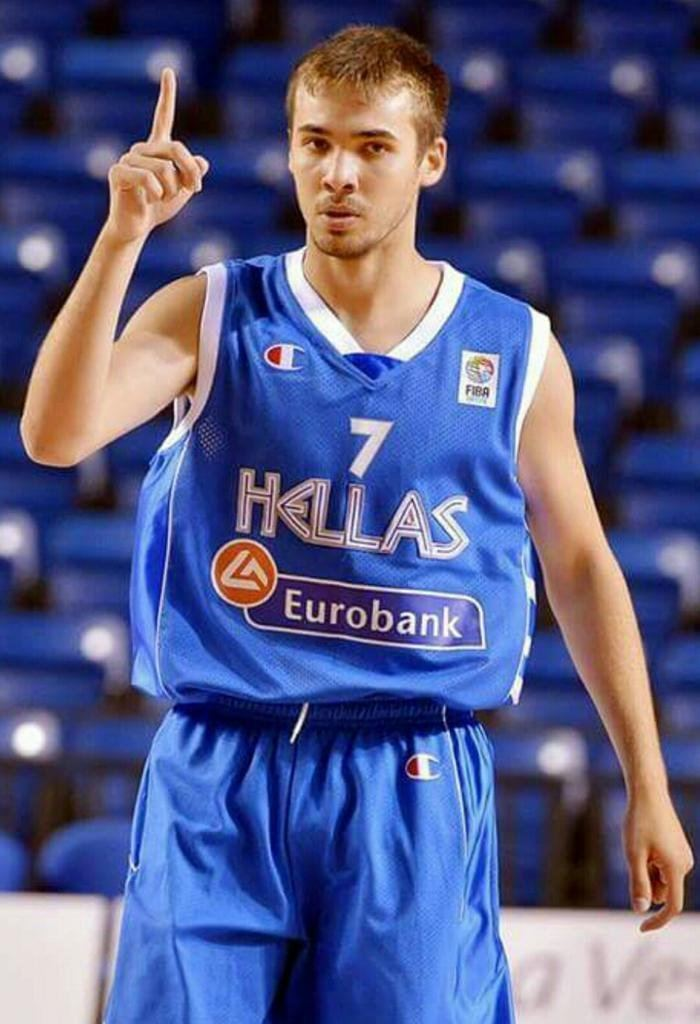

No. 10 – Pagrati
- Position: Point guard / shooting guard
- League: Greek 2nd Division

Personal information
- Born: 19 September 1994 (age 32) Maroussi, Athens, Greece
- Listed height: 6 ft 3.75 in (1.92 m)
- Listed weight: 205 lb (93 kg)

Career information
- Playing career: 2009–present

Career history
- 2009–2011: Panathinaikos
- 2011–2013: Amyntas
- 2013–2017: Arkadikos
- 2017–2018: Kastorias
- 2018–2019: Panionios
- 2019–present: Pagrati

Career highlights
- EuroLeague champion (2011); 2× Greek League champion (2010, 2011)

Ioannis Karamalegkos (alternative spellings: Giannis, Yiannis, Karamalegos) (Greek: Ιωάννης Καραμαλέγκος; born 19 September 1994 in Maroussi, Athens, Greece) is a Greek professional basketball player. He is 1.92 m (6 ft 3 3/4" in) tall, and he can play at both the point guard and shooting guard positions.

== Professional career ==
Karamalegkos began his professional career with the Greek Basket League club Panathinaikos Athens in 2009. He was a member of the Panathinaikos team that won the EuroLeague championship in 2011. After that, he signed with Amyntas. In 2013, he signed with Arkadikos.

He moved to Kastorias in 2017.

== National team career ==
Karamalegkos was a member of the junior national teams of Greece. With Greece's junior national teams he played at the 2010 FIBA Europe Under-16 Championship, the 2012 FIBA Europe Under-18 Championship, and the 2013 FIBA Europe Under-20 Championship.

== Career statistics ==
Legend
GP	Games played	GS	Games started	MPG	Minutes per game
FG%	Field-goal percentage	3P%	3-point field-goal percentage	FT%	Free-throw percentage
RPG	Rebounds per game	APG	Assists per game	SPG	Steals per game
BPG	Blocks per game	PPG	Points per game	PIR	Performance index rating
**Bold**	Career high

=== EuroLeague ===
†	Denotes seasons in which Karamalegkos won the EuroLeague

Year	Team	GP	GS	MPG	FG%	3P%	FT%	RPG	APG	SPG	BPG	PPG	PIR
2010–11†	Panathinaikos	1	0	1.0	—	—	—	—	—	—	—	0.0	0.0
Career		1	0	1.0	—	—	—	—	—	—	—	0.0	0.0

== See also ==
- List of youngest EuroLeague players
