= Simone Fontecchio =

Italian basketball player (born 1995)

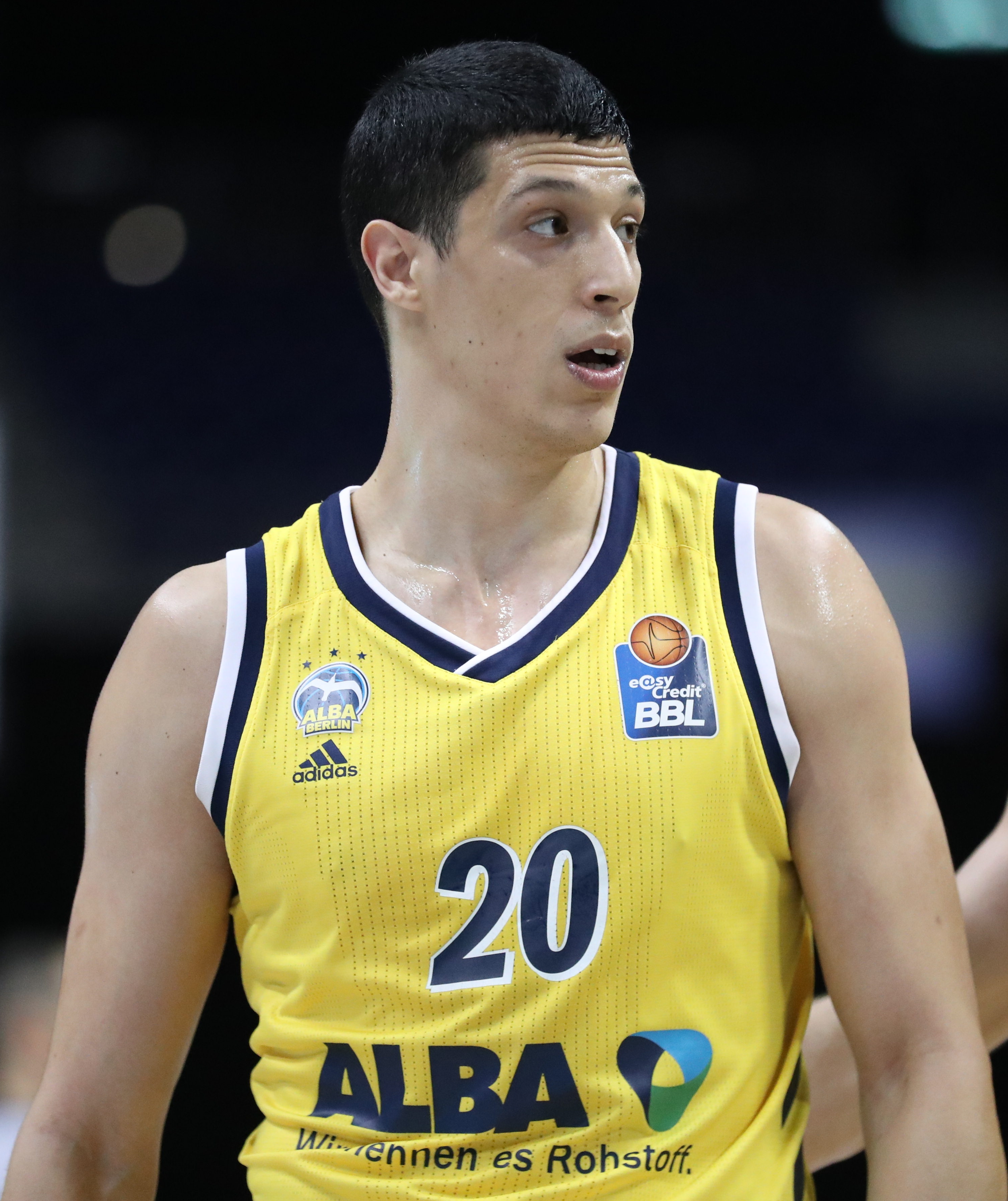
- Fontecchio with ALBA Berlin in 2021

No. 0 – Miami Heat
- Position: Small forward
- League: NBA

Personal information
- Born: 9 December 1995 (age 30) Pescara, Italy
- Listed height: 6 ft 7 in (2.01 m)
- Listed weight: 209 lb (95 kg)

Career information
- NBA draft: 2017: undrafted
- Playing career: 2012–present

Career history
- 2012–2016: Virtus Bologna
- 2016–2019: Olimpia Milano
- 2017–2018: →Vanoli Cremona
- 2019–2020: Reggiana
- 2020–2021: Alba Berlin
- 2021–2022: Baskonia
- 2022–2024: Utah Jazz
- 2024–2025: Detroit Pistons
- 2025–present: Miami Heat

Career highlights
- Italian Cup winner (2016); 3× Italian Super Cup winner (2016–2018); LBA All-Star (2014); LBA Best Player Under 22 (2015); German Champion (2021); All-Bundesliga Second Team (2021)
- Stats at NBA.com
- Stats at Basketball Reference

Simone Fontecchio (born 9 December 1995) is an Italian professional basketball player for the Miami Heat of the National Basketball Association (NBA). He plays at the small forward position.

== Youth career ==
Fontecchio participated in an array of youth tournaments:

1. 2011 Jordan Brand Classic International Tour game in London (not to be confused with the International Game of the same tournament)
2. 2012 Albert Schweitzer Tournament
3. 2012 Basketball Without Borders Europe
4. 2012-13 Euroleague Basketball Next Generation Tournament Rome tournament.

Fontecchio notably won the Italian Under 17 championship in 2011–12 and the Under 19 championship the same season and in 2012–13, all for Virtus Bologna.

== Professional career ==
=== Virtus Bologna (2012–2016) ===
Fontecchio was promoted from the Virtus U19 to the senior side in 2012–13, alternating between the two during the season. He played a symbolic minute in LBA on 4 November 2011 before posting his first genuine first division stat sheet, missing his five shots for three rebounds and a steal, on 30 December.

After an active youth career and a professional debut at only 17, there was talk of him going to the United States to play high school and later on college basketball, however he stayed loyal to Virtus and signed a five-year professional contract with the team in June 2013, his parents had to be present as he was still a minor at the time.

After twice being selected to take part in the league All Star Game (2014 and 2015), he was voted Best Player Under 22 in May 2015. That season would also see his first participation in the playoffs, scoring 10.3 points and grabbing 3.3 rebounds per game as Virtus were swept by title holders Olimpia Milano.

Fontecchio declared for the 2015 NBA draft on 25 April as an early entrant, two years before being automatically eligible in 2017. He attended a draft workout with the Boston Celtics in June 2015, whilst they declaredly considered picking in the second round, he withdrew his candidacy on 16 June 2015.

=== Olimpia Milano (2016–2019) ===
On 8 July 2016, Fontecchio signed with Olimpia Milano of the Lega Basket Serie A and the EuroLeague. After an unsatisfying 2018–19 season with Olimpia, where Fontecchio played an average of less than a minute Euroleague and 2.8 minutes in Serie A, Fontecchio was set to join his former team Virtus Bologna, coached by Aleksandar Đorđević, but the agreement was not finalized.

=== Reggio Emilia (2019–2020) ===
On 18 July 2019, Fontecchio signed with Reggio Emilia in the Italian Lega Basket Serie A (LBA).

=== Alba Berlin (2020–2021) ===
On 7 July 2020, Fontecchio signed with Alba Berlin of the Basketball Bundesliga (BBL). It was here where Fontecchio broke out, averaging 10.6 points in over 23 minutes per game.

=== Baskonia (2021–2022) ===
On 9 July 2021, Fontecchio signed a three-year deal with Baskonia of the Liga ACB.

=== Utah Jazz (2022–2024) ===
On 17 July 2022, Fontecchio signed a two-year, $6.25 million contract with the National Basketball Association's (NBA) Utah Jazz. Fontecchio made his NBA debut on 19 October. On 7 December, Fontecchio made a game-winning dunk in a 124–123 win over the Golden State Warriors. Fontecchio's career high came on 14 December 2023, against the Portland Trail Blazers, where he scored 24 points on 87% field goal percentage. Fontecchio tied his career-high 24 points on 2 January 2024, in a 127–90 win against the Dallas Mavericks.

=== Detroit Pistons (2024–2025) ===
On February 8, 2024, Fontecchio was traded to the Detroit Pistons in exchange for Kevin Knox II, a second round pick and the rights to Gabriele Procida.

In May 2024, Fontecchio underwent surgery on his left big toe.

On July 12, 2024, Fontecchio re-signed with the Pistons on a two-year, $16 million contract.

=== Miami Heat (2025–present) ===
On July 7, 2025, Fontecchio was traded to the Miami Heat in exchange for Duncan Robinson. On March 10, 2026, Fontecchio's Heat teammate Bam Adebayo scored 83 points, the second-most of all time in a single NBA game. With Fontecchio, the next leading scorer, putting up 18 points, the two became the second-highest scoring duo in a single NBA game, only behind Wilt Chamberlain and Al Attles in Chamberlain's 100-point game in 1962. Fontecchio made 70 appearances (including nine starts) for Miami during the 2025–26 NBA season, recording averages of 8.5 points, 3.0 rebounds, and 1.4 assists.

On July 2, 2026, Fontecchio re-signed with the Heat on a one-year minimum contract.

== National team career ==
Fontecchio has played for the under age teams of Italy since turning up for the U16's in the 2011 European Championship (10th place). Since then, he was involved with the U18's in the 2012 European Championship (7th place) and 2013 European Championship (10th place, best scorer for Italy) and the U20's in the 2014 European Championship (10th place).

Fontecchio participated to the 2020 Summer Olympics basketball tournament with Italy, reaching the quarterfinals. He was the leading scorer in Italy's 92–82 win over Germany, scoring 20 points, grabbing 4 rebounds, dishing out 2 assists and stealing 3 balls. He was also Italy's top performer in this game, with a 21 efficiency rate. He was again the leading scorer in Italy's 83–86 loss to eventual bronze medalist Australia, with 22 points. In the third and last game of their group stage, Italy defeated Nigeria 80–71, and Fontecchio tied with Pajola for assists leader. Italy lost 75–84 to eventual silver medalist France in quarterfinals. In this game, Fontecchio was the leading scorer with 23 points. By the end of the tournament he was ranked among the players who "should be on NBA radars".

In 2023, Fontecchio represented the national team at the 2023 FIBA Basketball World Cup where Italy finished 8th overall. He averaged 18.0 points and 5.6 rebounds per game. In recognition of his individual play, Fontecchio was named to the All-FIBA World Cup Second Team.

On August 31, 2025, in the third game of EuroBasket 2025, Fontecchio scored 39 points against Bosnia. This set a new Italian record for points in a single game at the EuroBasket tournament and was the sixth-best performance ever for the Italian national team.

== Personal life ==
Fontecchio's mother Malì Pomilio played for Italy and won two European titles for AS Vicenza in basketball, and Fontecchio considers her as an influence in his career choice. His father Daniele was a professional hurdler whilst his grandfather was also a basketball player, as is his older brother Luca who has played in the lower divisions after also coming through the youth ranks of Virtus.

Fontecchio moved to Bologna from his native Pescara at the age of 14, living in shared accommodation with other Virtus youth players.

He has two daughters, Bianca and Luna.

== Career statistics ==
Legend
GP	Games played	GS	Games started	MPG	Minutes per game
FG%	Field-goal percentage	3P%	3-point field-goal percentage	FT%	Free-throw percentage
RPG	Rebounds per game	APG	Assists per game	SPG	Steals per game
BPG	Blocks per game	PPG	Points per game	PIR	Performance index rating
**Bold**	Career high

=== NBA ===
Year	Team	GP	GS	MPG	FG%	3P%	FT%	RPG	APG	SPG	BPG	PPG
2022–23	Utah	52	6	14.7	.369	.330	.795	1.7	.8	.3	.2	6.3
2023–24	Utah	50	**34**	23.2	.450	.391	.800	3.5	1.5	.6	**.4**	8.9
2023–24	Detroit	16	9	**30.3**	**.479**	**.426**	**.846**	**4.4**	**1.8**	**.9**	.3	**15.4**
2024–25	Detroit	**75**	0	16.5	.402	.335	.833	2.9	.9	.4	.2	5.9
2025–26	Miami	70	9	16.8	.412	.375	.843	3.0	1.4	.5	.1	8.5
Career		263	58	18.3	.417	.367	.828	2.9	1.2	.5	.2	7.8

=== Euroleague ===
Year	Team	GP	GS	MPG	FG%	3P%	FT%	RPG	APG	SPG	BPG	PPG	PIR
2016–17	Olimpia	10	2	11.7	.433	.412	.000	1.5	.8	.5	.1	3.3	1.9
2017–18	Olimpia	2	0	2.0	.000	.000	.000	.0	.0	.0	.0	.0	.0
2018–19	Olimpia	5	0	.8	.000	.000	.000	.0	.0	.0	.0	.0	–1.2
2020–21	Alba	**29**	**24**	23.4	**.476**	.388	**.886**	3.4	1.6	.9	**.2**	10.6	10.1
2021–22	Baskonia	17	11	**26.4**	.475	**.426**	.793	**4.4**	**2.2**	**1.2**	.1	**11.9**	**13.2**
Career		63	37	19.8	.470	.400	.844	3.0	1.4	.8	.2	8.6	8.4

=== Lega Basket Serie A ===
Year	Team	League	GP	MPG	FG%	3P%	FT%	RPG	APG	SPG	BPG	PPG
2012–13	Virtus Bologna	Serie A	12	12.8	.324	.222	.800	1.4	.2	.4	.2	2.7
2013–14	Virtus Bologna	Serie A	25	15.4	.426	.345	.750	1.1	.2	.4	.2	2.7
2014–15	Virtus Bologna	Serie A	30	24.5	.384	.292	.659	2.3	1.5	.9	.2	7.4
2015–16	Virtus Bologna	Serie A	30	**27.5**	.397	.328	.838	**3.5**	**1.9**	**1.0**	.1	9.2
2016–17	Olimpia Milano	Serie A	28	12.1	**.495**	**.422**	.714	1.6	.8	.4	.1	4.6
2017–18	Olimpia Milano	Serie A	4	7.5	.286	.200	—	.3	.0	.3	.1	1.3
2017–18	Vanoli Cremona	Serie A	23	23.6	.422	.385	.806	3.1	.8	.9	**.4**	**10.1**
2018–19	Olimpia Milano	Serie A	**34**	12	.443	.375	**.857**	1.1	.3	.3	.2	4.0

Sources: Serie A
