= Paul Zipser =

German basketball player (born 1994)

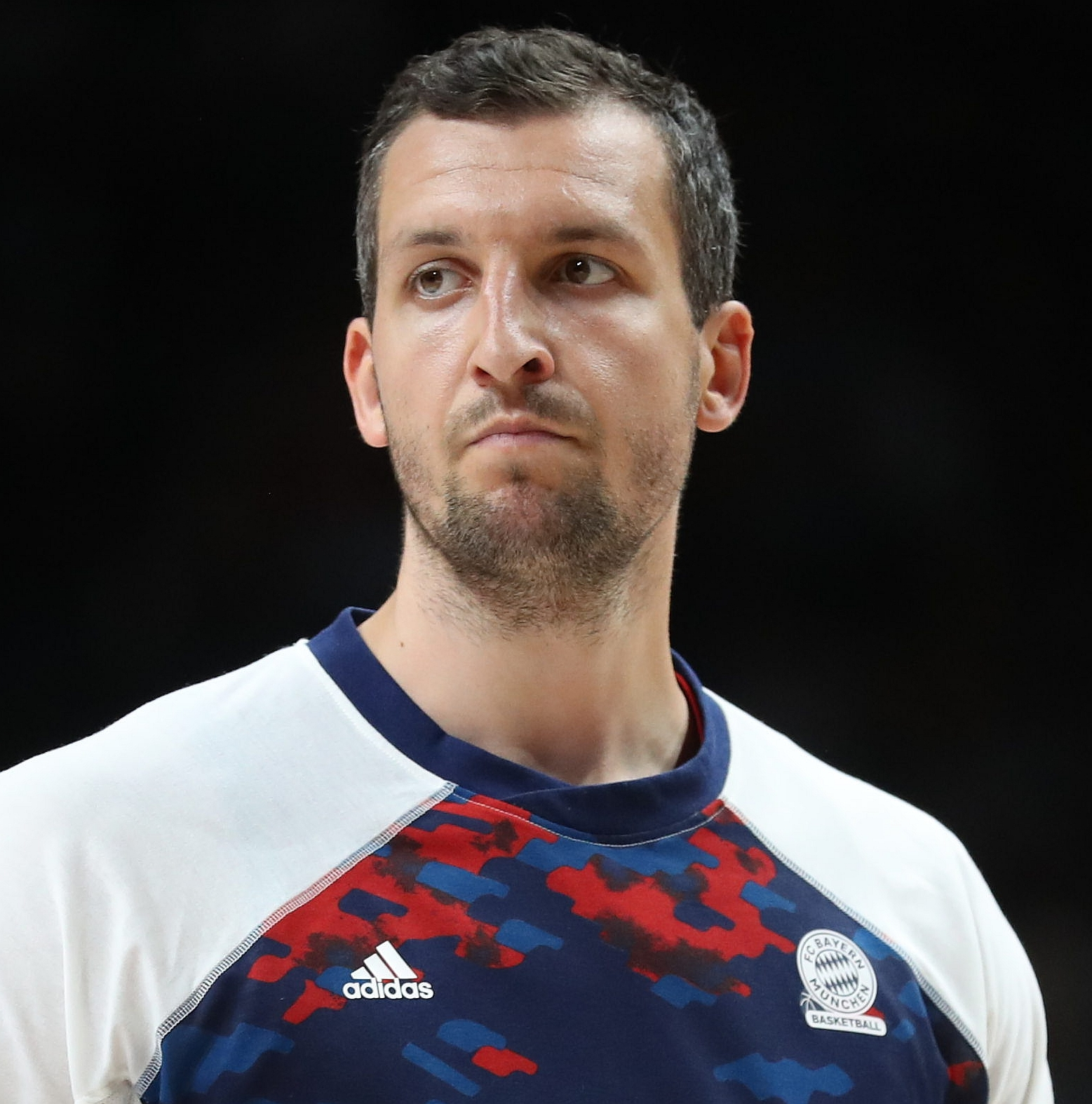
- Zipser in 2022

No. 9 – MLP Academics Heidelberg
- Position: Small forward / power forward
- League: ProA

Personal information
- Born: 18 February 1994 (age 32) Heidelberg, Germany
- Listed height: 6 ft 8 in (2.03 m)
- Listed weight: 231 lb (105 kg)

Career information
- NBA draft: 2016: 2nd round, 48th overall pick
- Drafted by: Chicago Bulls
- Playing career: 2010–present

Career history
- 2010–2012: Heidelberg
- 2013–2016: Bayern Munich
- 2016–2018: Chicago Bulls
- 2016–2018: →Windy City Bulls
- 2019: San Pablo Burgos
- 2019–2023: Bayern Munich
- 2023–present: MLP Academics Heidelberg

Career highlights
- German BBL champion (2014); 2× German Cup winner (2021, 2023); BBL All-Star (2016); BBL Best German Young Player (2016)
- Stats at NBA.com
- Stats at Basketball Reference

Paul Victor Louis Zipser (born 18 February 1994) is a German professional basketball player for MLP Academics Heidelberg of the ProA. Standing at 2.03 m (6 ft 8 in), he mainly plays at the small forward position. He was selected by the Chicago Bulls with the 48th overall pick in the 2016 NBA draft.

== Professional career ==
=== Heidelberg (2010–2012) ===
Zipser began his professional career in his hometown with USC Heidelberg in 2010. In 2011–12, he averaged 7.9 points, 3 rebounds and 1.2 assists per game. He managed just two games for Heidelberg in 2012–13 due to injury.

=== Bayern Munich (2013–2016) ===
On 18 January 2013, Zipser signed a four-year deal with Bayern Munich.

On 21 April 2015, Zipser entered the 2015 NBA draft as an early-entrant, only to withdraw from it later.

In 2015–16, Zipser played 40 league games for Bayern Munich, averaging 7.1 points, 3.6 rebounds and 1.4 assists in 18.5 minutes per game. For the season, he was named the League's Best German Young Player.

In June 2016, Zipser attended the Adidas Eurocamp, a basketball camp based in Treviso for the NBA Draft prospects. He was named the Eurocamp 2016 MVP.

=== Chicago Bulls (2016–2018) ===
On 23 June 2016, Zipser was selected by the Chicago Bulls with the 48th overall pick in the 2016 NBA draft. On 15 July, he signed with the Bulls. On 12 January 2017, in just his 11th appearance of the season, Zipser made his first career start in the Bulls' 104–89 loss to the New York Knicks; he had a then season-high seven points. On 22 March, he scored a career-high 15 points in a 117–95 win over the Detroit Pistons. In the Bulls' regular-season finale on 12 April, Zipser set a new career high with 21 points in a 112–73 win over the Brooklyn Nets. During his rookie season, he received multiple assignments to the Windy City Bulls, Chicago's D-League affiliate.

Throughout 2017–18 season, he received very little playing time due to the Bulls' front office trying to develop other young talents. He was sent down to their G-League affiliate, the Windy City Bulls on several occasions. Zipser began seeing more playing time during the middle of the season. On 18 May 2018, Zipser was reported to have surgery in repairing a broken left foot. On 14 July, he was waived by the Bulls.

=== San Pablo Burgos (2019) ===
After being close to signing with the Brooklyn Nets according to media reports in January 2019, Zipser moved to Spanish Liga ACB side San Pablo Burgos on 17 January 2019.

=== Return to Bayern Munich (2019–2023) ===
On 5 August 2019 Zipser signed with Bayern Munich of the Basketball Bundesliga (BBL).

=== Return to Heidelberg (2023–present) ===
On 1 July 2023, after a break of 11 years, he signed for a second stint with MLP Academics Heidelberg of the Basketball Bundesliga (BBL).

== National team career ==
Zipser has been a member of the German national under-16 and under-18 teams. He played in the 2010 FIBA Europe Under-16 Championship, 2011 and 2012 FIBA Europe Under-18 Championship. In 2012 he also played in Albert Schweitzer Tournament and was named to the All-Tournament Team, averaging 14.6 points, 5 rebounds and 2.3 assists per game.

On 30 July 2015, Zipser made his debut for the Germany national basketball team in a game against Austria. During FIBA EuroBasket 2015, he averaged 5.2 points, 5.2 rebounds and 1.8 assists per game.

== Personal life ==
During EuroBasket 2015, Zipser raised controversy by refusing to sign an autograph for Vuk Ivanović, a boy of Serbian descent who was wearing a Serbian jersey, who claimed he wants to sell the autograph later. However, Zipser gave an autographed game-worn jersey and shorts to Saint Sava Serbian Orthodox Church for a special raffle at 2018 SerbFest in Merrillville, Indiana.

== Career statistics ==
Legend
| GP | Games played | GS | Games started | MPG | Minutes per game |
| FG% | Field-goal percentage | 3P% | 3-point field-goal percentage | FT% | Free-throw percentage |
| RPG | Rebounds per game | APG | Assists per game | SPG | Steals per game |
| BPG | Blocks per game | PPG | Points per game | PIR | Performance index rating |
| **Bold** | Career high |

=== NBA ===
==== Regular season ====
| Year | Team | GP | GS | MPG | FG% | 3P% | FT% | RPG | APG | SPG | BPG | PPG |
|---|---|---|---|---|---|---|---|---|---|---|---|---|
| 2016–17 | Chicago | 44 | **18** | **19.2** | **.398** | .333 | **.775** | **2.8** | .8 | .3 | **.4** | **5.5** |
| 2017–18 | Chicago | **54** | 12 | 15.3 | .346 | **.336** | .760 | 2.4 | **.9** | **.4** | .3 | 4.0 |
| Career | | 98 | 30 | 17.0 | .371 | .335 | .769 | 2.6 | .8 | .4 | .3 | 4.7 |

==== Playoffs ====
| Year | Team | GP | GS | MPG | FG% | 3P% | FT% | RPG | APG | SPG | BPG | PPG |
|---|---|---|---|---|---|---|---|---|---|---|---|---|
| 2017 | Chicago | 6 | 0 | 22.7 | .455 | .375 | 1.000 | 3.5 | .5 | .2 | .2 | 7.3 |
| Career | | 6 | 0 | 22.7 | .455 | .375 | 1.000 | 3.5 | .5 | .2 | .2 | 7.3 |

=== EuroLeague ===
| * | Led the league |

| Year | Team | GP | GS | MPG | FG% | 3P% | FT% | RPG | APG | SPG | BPG | PPG | PIR |
|---|---|---|---|---|---|---|---|---|---|---|---|---|---|
| 2013–14 | Bayern | 5 | 0 | 7.6 | .375 | .333 | **1.000** | 1.0 | .6 | — | — | 4.2 | 2.8 |
| 2014–15 | Bayern | 3 | 1 | 12.7 | **.500** | **.500** | — | 1.7 | .3 | .3 | .3 | 3.3 | 1.7 |
| 2015–16 | Bayern | 10 | 1 | 15.2 | .475 | .278 | **1.000** | 3.1 | **1.2** | .4 | **.7** | 5.3 | 7.1 |
| 2019–20 | Bayern | 28* | **8** | **22.1** | .441 | .403 | .800 | **3.4** | **1.2** | .5 | .4 | 8.5 | 8.1 |
| 2020–21 | Bayern | **39** | 6 | 22.0 | .496 | .438 | .805 | 3.0 | 1.1 | **.7** | .3 | **9.1** | **9.5** |
| 2021–22 | Bayern | 3 | 0 | 7.0 | .500 | .333 | — | 1.7 | — | .3 | — | 1.7 | 1.0 |
| 2022–23 | Bayern | 20 | 5 | 9.5 | .391 | .424 | .833 | 1.1 | .1 | .4 | .1 | 2.8 | 1.9 |
| Career | | 108 | 21 | 17.7 | .463 | .415 | .824 | 2.6 | .9 | .5 | .3 | 6.8 | 6.8 |
