= Tomaž Bolčina =

Slovenian basketball player

Free Agent
- Position: Center

Personal information
- Born: January 6, 1994 (age 32) Šempeter pri Gorici, Slovenia
- Listed height: 2.08 m (6 ft 10 in)

Career information
- Playing career: 2011–present

Career history
- 2011–2012: Helios Domžale
- 2012–2015: Krka Novo mesto
- 2013–2014: → Krka mladi
- 2015c2016: Tajfun Šentjur
- 2016–2017: Helios Suns
- 2017–2018: Šentjur
- 2019: Adria Oil Škrljevo

Career highlights
- 2x Slovenian Champion (2013, 2014); 2x Slovenian Cup Winner (2014, 2015)

Tomaž Bolčina (born January 6, 1994, in Šempeter pri Gorici, Slovenia) is a Slovenian professional basketball player who last played for KK Skrljevo. He is a 2.08 m tall Center.
