= Nikola Radičević =

Serbian basketball player

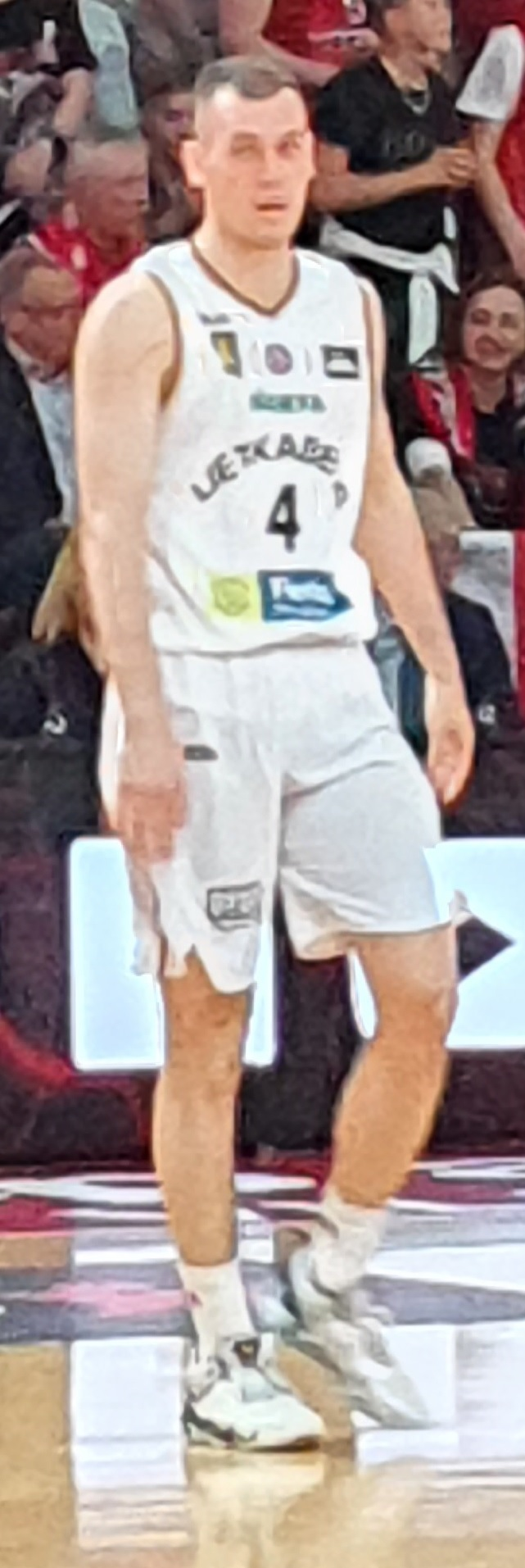
- Radičevič with the Lietkabelis Panevėžys during the 2022 LKL Finals

No. 31 – Joventut Badalona
- Position: Point guard
- League: Liga ACB; Champions League

Personal information
- Born: 25 April 1994 (age 32) Čačak, Serbia, FR Yugoslavia
- Listed height: 1.96 m (6 ft 5 in)
- Listed weight: 91 kg (201 lb)

Career information
- NBA draft: 2015: 2nd round, 57th overall pick
- Drafted by: Denver Nuggets
- Playing career: 2012–present

Career history
- 2012–2017: Sevilla
- 2017–2018: Crvena zvezda
- 2018: Gran Canaria
- 2018: Aquila Trento
- 2018–2020: Gran Canaria
- 2020: Murcia
- 2020: Promitheas Patras
- 2021: Trefl Sopot
- 2021–2022: Lietkabelis Panevėžys
- 2022–2023: Bilbao
- 2023–2024: Cedevita Olimpija
- 2024–2025: MoraBanc Andorra
- 2025: Dziki Warsaw
- 2026: Lietkabelis Panevėžys
- 2026–present: Joventut Badalona

Career highlights
- Slovenian League champion (2024); Slovenian Cup winner (2024); Albert Schweitzer Tournament MVP (2012)
- Stats at Basketball Reference
Medals
Men's basketball
Representing Serbia
FIBA Europe Under-18 Championship
Bronze medal – third place	2012 Lithuania & Latvia	U-18 Team
Silver medal – second place	2011 Poland	U-18 Team
FIBA Europe Under-16 Championship
Bronze medal – third place	2009 Lithuania	U-16 Team

Nikola Radičević (Serbian: Никола Радичевић; born 25 April 1994) is a Serbian professional basketball player for Joventut Badalona of the Liga ACB and the Champions League. Standing at 1.96 m (6 ft 5 in), he plays at the point guard position.

== Early career ==
Born in Čačak, Radičević began his playing career with Belgrade-based Partizan's youth system.

== Professional career ==
In 2012, Radičević moved to Baloncesto Sevilla of the Spanish Liga ACB, signing with the club for five seasons. He trained with the club's first team, while also playing with the club's youth team in the Liga EBA (Spanish 4th Division), as well as with the club's first team. For the 2014–15 season, he finally secured a permanent spot in Sevilla's first team.

On 1 August 2017, Radičević signed a three-year deal with Serbian team Crvena zvezda. On 22 January 2018, he left Crvena zvezda and signed with Gran Canaria.

On 8 August 2018, Radičević signed a three-year deal with the Italian club Aquila Basket Trento.

On 14 November 2018, he signed with Gran Canaria of the Liga ACB.

On 9 February 2020, he signed with UCAM Murcia of the Liga ACB. On 10 October 2020, he signed with Greek club Promitheas Patras.

On 26 February 2021, Radičević signed with Trefl Sopot of the Polish Basketball League.

On 29 June 2021 he signed with Lietkabelis of the Lithuanian Basketball League (LKL).

On 28 June 2022 he signed with Bilbao of the Spanish Liga ACB.

On 27 August 2023, Radičević signed with Cedevita Olimpija of the Adriatic League and the Slovenian Basketball League.

On 5 November 2024, Radičević signed with MoraBanc Andorra of the Spanish Liga ACB. However, he left the team on 6 January 2025.

On 11 January 2025, Radičević signed with Dziki Warsaw of the Polish Basketball League.

On 12 February 2026, Radičević signed with Lietkabelis Panevėžys of the Lithuanian Basketball League (LKL).

On October 30, 2026, he signed with Joventut Badalona of the Liga ACB and the Champions League.

=== NBA draft rights ===
On 25 June 2015, Radičević was drafted with the 57th overall pick of the 2015 NBA draft by the Denver Nuggets. He played for the Nuggets during 2017 NBA Summer League. On 22 November 2020, his draft rights were traded to the Detroit Pistons. On 11 July 2022, his draft rights were traded to the New York Knicks.

== National team career ==
After averaging 12.4 points, 2.9 rebounds and 5.1 assists per game, Radičević was named to the All-Tournament Team of the 2012 FIBA Europe Under-18 Championship.
