= Benjamin Sene =

French basketball player (born 1994)

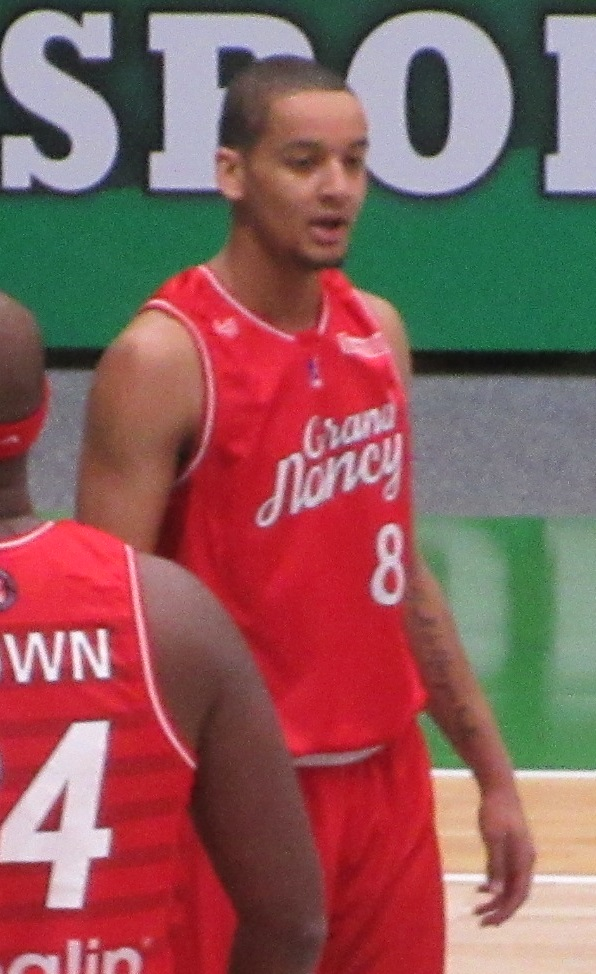

No. 8 – Nanterre 92
- Position: Point guard
- League: LNB Élite; Champions League

Personal information
- Born: 13 May 1994 (age 32) Langon, Gironde, France
- Listed height: 6 ft 1 in (1.85 m)
- Listed weight: 180 lb (82 kg)

Career information
- NBA draft: 2015: undrafted
- Playing career: 2011–present

Career history
- 2011–2017: SLUC Nancy
- 2017–2020: BCM Gravelines-Dunkerque
- 2020–2021: Boulazac Basket Dordogne
- 2021–present: Nanterre 92

Benjamin Sene (born 13 May 1994) is a French professional basketball player for Nanterre 92 of the LNB Pro A and the Champions League.

== Professional career ==
Sene played junior basketball with SLUC Nancy. In January 2013, he fractured his thumb. On 2 March 2013 he suffered a fracture to his left radius. On 7 March he had surgery and plastering, forcing him to miss two months of competition. At the end of his junior career, he was courted by Boulogne-sur-Mer but stayed with Nancy. In March 2014, he injured his ankle in training and missed three weeks of competition. In April 2015, he extended his contract with Nancy until 2017.

Sene joined BCM Gravelines-Dunkerque in May 2017. In 2017-18 Sene averaged 10.3 points, 2.9 rebounds and 4.9 assists per game with Gravelines-Dunkerque. After the season he signed an extension to his contract until 2020. Sene left the team on 8 May, after averaging 11.3 points and 3.8 assists in 2019-2020.

Sene signed with Boulazac Basket Dordogne on 14 May 2020.

On 9 July 2021 he signed with Nanterre 92 of LNB Pro A.
