= Mikhail Kulagin =

Russian basketball player

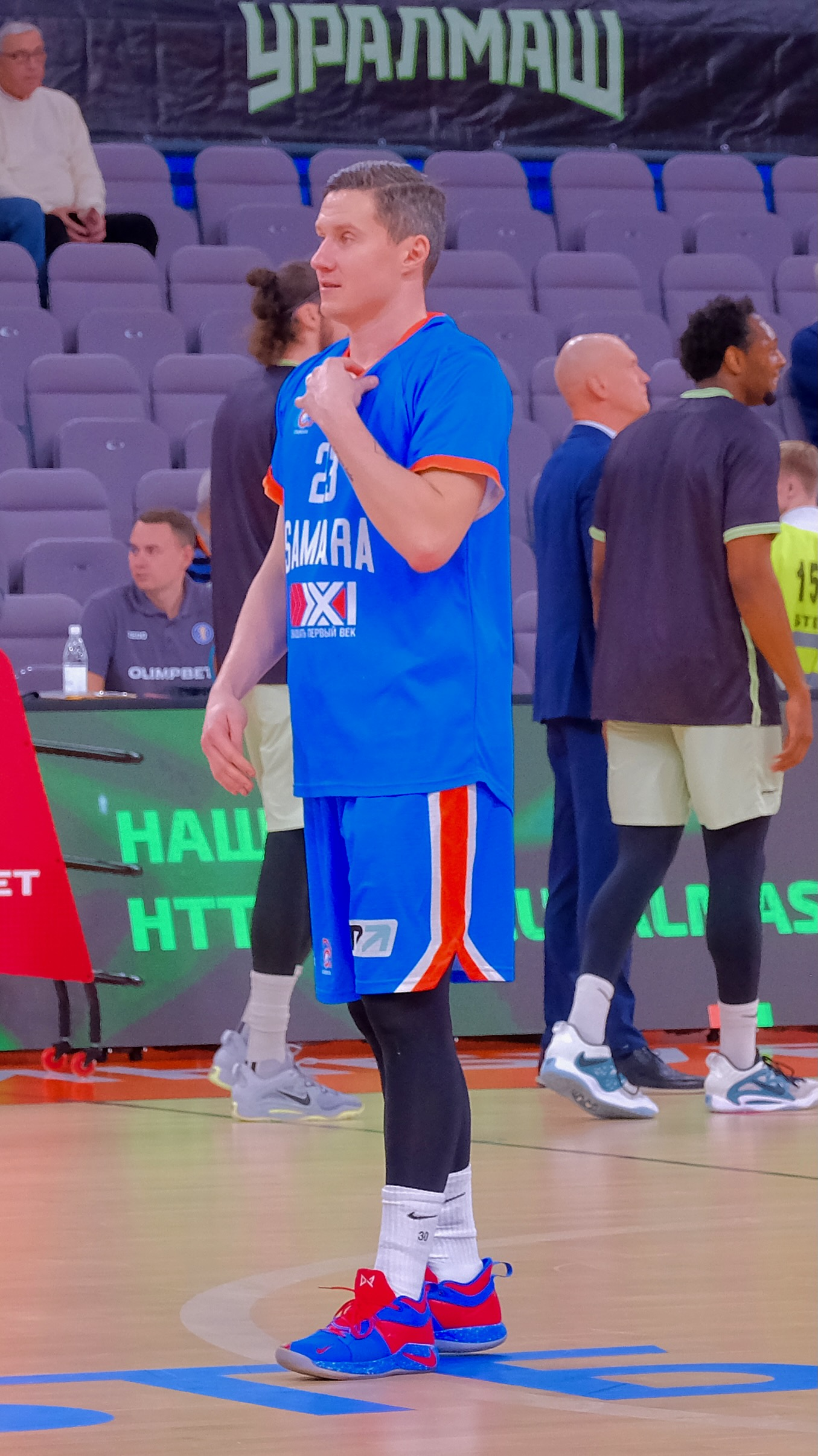
- Mikhail Kulagin in 2023

No. 23 – BC Samara
- Position: Point guard / shooting guard
- League: VTB United League

Personal information
- Born: 4 August 1994 (age 32) Moscow, Russia
- Listed height: 6 ft 3.75 in (1.92 m)
- Listed weight: 200 lb (91 kg)

Career information
- Playing career: 2012–present

Career history
- 2012–2014: Triumph Lyubertsy
- 2014–2015: Rossiya Novogorsk
- 2015–2020: CSKA Moscow
- 2020–2021: BC Enisey
- 2021–2022: Nizhny Novgorod
- 2022–2023: UNICS
- 2023–present: Samara

Career highlights
- EuroLeague champion (2016); 2× VTB United League champion (2016, 2017)

Mikhail Andreyevich Kulagin (Russian: Михаил Андреевич Кулагин; born 4 August 1994) is a Russian professional basketball player for Samara of the VTB United League. He is a 1.92 m (6 ft 3 1/2 in) tall point guard-shooting guard.

== Professional career ==
After playing with the youth clubs of CSKA Moscow, Kulagin has played professionally with the Russian clubs Triumph Lyubertsy, Rossiya Novogorsk, and CSKA Moscow. After five seasons, he parted ways with CSKA Moscow on 1 June 2020. On 19 August 2020 Kulagin signed with BC Enisey.

On 20 July 2021 he signed for the third time with Nizhny Novgorod of the VTB United League.

On 29 June 2022 he signed with UNICS Kazan of the VTB United League.

== National team career ==
=== Russian junior national team ===
Kulagin was a member of the junior national teams of Russia. With Russia's junior national teams, he played at the 2010 FIBA Europe Under-16 Championship, the 2012 FIBA Europe Under-18 Championship, where he was a member of the All-Tournament Team, the 2013 FIBA Under-19 World Championship, and the 2014 FIBA Europe Under-20 Championship.

=== Russian senior national team ===
Kulagin has been a member of the senior Russian national basketball team. With Russia, he played at the EuroBasket 2017.

== Career statistics ==
Legend
GP	Games played	GS	Games started	MPG	Minutes per game
FG%	Field-goal percentage	3P%	3-point field-goal percentage	FT%	Free-throw percentage
RPG	Rebounds per game	APG	Assists per game	SPG	Steals per game
BPG	Blocks per game	PPG	Points per game	PIR	Performance index rating
**Bold**	Career high

=== EuroLeague ===
†	Denotes seasons in which Kulagin won the EuroLeague

Year	Team	GP	GS	MPG	FG%	3P%	FT%	RPG	APG	SPG	BPG	PPG	PIR
2015–16†	CSKA Moscow	**18**	1	5.4	**.448**	.250	.000	.7	.5	.1	—	1.6	1.1
2016–17	CSKA Moscow	17	5	10.4	.373	.300	**.800**	**1.5**	1.2	.3	.1	3.9	2.7
2021–22	Zenit	17	**7**	**19.1**	.407	**.425**	.467	**1.5**	**2.4**	**.6**	**.3**	**5.5**	**4.5**
Career		52	13	11.5	.401	.354	.577	1.3	1.3	.3	.1	3.7	2.7

== Personal life ==
His older brother, Dmitry Kulagin, is also a professional basketball player. He is currently in a relationship with Yana Sizikova, a professional tennis player. The couple married in 2025.
