= Jacob Larsen (basketball) =

Danish basketball player (born 1997)

Personal information
- Born: May 5, 1997 (age 29) Holte, Denmark
- Listed height: 6 ft 11 in (2.11 m)
- Listed weight: 227 lb (103 kg)

Career information
- High school: Falkonergårdens Gymnasium; (Frederiksberg, Denmark)
- College: Gonzaga (2017–2018)
- Playing career: 2013–2018
- Position: Power forward / center

Career history
- 2013–2015: Virum Vipers
- 2015–2016: SISU Copenhagen

Jacob Glarbjerg Larsen (born May 5, 1997) is a Danish former basketball player. A 6’11’’ (210 cm) post player, he joined the Gonzaga University Bulldogs for the 2016–17 season, but did not make his debut with the team until the 2017–18 season due to a knee injury suffered in a 2016 preseason practice.

== Youth career ==
Born in Holte, Larsen started his career in the youth teams at Virum Basketball Klub in the northern outskirts of Copenhagen, and was promoted to the club's men's team in 2013. He played in the second-tier league in Denmark with the Virum Vipers. In 2014, he helped lead Virum to winning the Danish 1st Division Regular Season title and a trip to the semifinals.

In September 2015, Larsen signed with SISU Copenhagen. Larsen chose SISU since he wanted to play in the best league in Denmark and his familiarity to people from the Danish National Team, including the head coach, as well as many of the squad's youth players. Larsen was hampered by inflammation in his knee, but SISU was sympathetic to his recovery time. Larsen wanted to spend one-year training with professional competition before leaving for the United States to play college basketball after the summer of 2016. In October 2015, it was reported that Larsen was expected to miss the whole season with SISU due to injury.

=== Recruiting ===
"Jacob has great size and is doing a great job continuing to develop. We can afford to be patient with him, and in the long run, we feel he is going to be an excellent player."

— Mark Few, Gonzaga Head Coach.

"We think he has a incredible upside with all the intangibles you like in a big guy – great hands, very good feet, strong body. He’s also cerebral. We love his size and length and tremendous feet. We’re looking at that more in a big guy than if he can touch the top of the backboard. It’s a sneaky trait for our big men. Robert Sacre had tremendous feet. He can really move his feet. Karnowski has good feet too."

— Tommy Lloyd, Gonzaga Associate Head Coach.

In April 2014, Larsen announced his dreams of dominating the second best league in Denmark, then moving on to exerting his dominance in the best Danish league, and then playing college basketball, with hopes of displaying his talent in the NBA someday. In February 2015, while participating in the first-ever Basketball without Borders Global Camp in Manhattan, New York, Larsen was singled out as one of the top performers of the camp. He announced that he planned to enroll in college in 2016, and that Duke, Maryland, and George Washington were among his top suitors.

In October 2015, Larsen flew to the United States to take official visits to Maryland, Gonzaga, and Marquette. After he joined fellow Gonzaga commit Zach Collins in his recruiting trip to Spokane for the Zags' annual pre-season player scrimmage called Kraziness in the Kennel, he verbally committed to Gonzaga in November 2015. Larsen chose the Zags due to their successful track record with international players, especially those from Europe, like himself. He signed with Gonzaga during the early signing period later that week.

College recruiting
Name	Hometown	School	Height	Weight	Commit date
Jacob Larsen; C	Holte, Denmark	Falkonergårdens Gymnasium; SISU Copenhagen	6 ft 10 in (2.08 m)	235 lb (107 kg)	Nov 12, 2015
Jacob Larsen; C	Recruit ratings: Scout: Rivals: 247Sports: ESPN: (NR)				
Overall recruit ranking: Scout: NR Rivals: NR 247Sports: #116 ESPN: NR
Note: In many cases, Scout, Rivals, 247Sports, On3, and ESPN may conflict in their listings of height and weight.; In these cases, the average was taken. ESPN grades are on a 100-point scale.; Sources: "2016 Gonzaga Rivals Commits". Rivals.; "2016 Gonzaga Scout Commits". Scout.; "2016 Gonzaga ESPN Commits". ESPN.; "Scout.com Team Recruiting Rankings". Scout.; "2016 Team Ranking". Rivals.; "2016 Gonzaga 24/7 Sports Commits". 247Sports.

== College career ==
Larsen was sidelined the entire 2016-17 campaign with a knee injury, which he sustained in practice. In the 2017–18 season, Larsen saw the court in 34 contests, averaging 2.9 points as well as 2.7 rebounds a contest in 8.4 minutes per game. He left the Gonzaga men's basketball team in October 2018 to focus on school, remaining on scholarship.

== International career ==
In 2012, Larsen was selected to play on Denmark's U16 national team at the 2012 European Championships (Division B), where he averaged 12.1 points, 8.5 boards as well as 1.9 blocks per contest.

The following year, he was the main man on Denmark's U16 squad that captured gold at the 2013 European Championships (Division B). He scored 20.0 points and pulled down 12.1 rebounds while blocking 4.0 shots a game en route to Eurobasket.com All-European Championships U16 Division B Best Player honors.

In February and March 2015, Larsen played in his first Adidas Next Generation Tournament in Belgrade for the U18 Vaerlose BBK squad and was named as one of the stars to watch in the event. He averaged 16.7 points, 6.7 rebounds, 2.3 assists, 1.7 blocks, 1 steal, and 60.6 percent from the field.

== Personal ==
His older brother Rasmus Larsen who was also a basketball player died in May 2015 at the age of 20.
