= Kevin Harley =

French basketball player

Free Agent
- Position: Small forward / shooting guard

Personal information
- Born: 20 April 1994 (age 32) Trappes, France
- Listed height: 196 cm (6 ft 5 in)

Career information
- Playing career: 2010–present

Career history
- 2010–2016: Poitiers
- 2016–2017: Denain
- 2017–2019: Poitiers
- 2019–2021: Boulazac Dordogne
- 2021–2023: Élan Chalon

Kevin Harley (born 20 April 1994) is a French basketball player who last played for French Pro B league club Élan Chalon.
