= Lefteris Bochoridis =

Greek basketball player

No. 13 – Aris Thessaloniki
- Position: Guard / small forward
- League: Greek Basketball League

Personal information
- Born: April 18, 1994 (age 32) Thessaloniki, Greece
- Listed height: 6 ft 5 in (1.96 m)
- Listed weight: 200 lb (91 kg)

Career information
- Playing career: 2010–present

Career history
- 2010–2014: Aris Thessaloniki
- 2014–2017: Panathinaikos
- 2017–2020: Aris Thessaloniki
- 2020–2023: Panathinaikos
- 2023–present: Aris Thessaloniki

Career highlights
- 2× Greek League champion (2017, 2021); 4× Greek Cup winner (2015–2017, 2021); Greek Super Cup winner (2021); 3× Greek League All Star (2018–2020)

Eleftherios "Lefteris" Bochoridis (Greek: Ελευθέριος "Λευτέρης" Μποχωρίδης; born April 18, 1994) is a Greek professional basketball player and the team captain for Aris of the Greek Basketball League. Born in Thessaloniki, Greece, he is a left-handed, 1.96 m (6 ft 5 in) tall combo guard and swingman.

== Early career ==
As a younger player, Bochoridis was speculated and compared by some as being a possible successor to Greek legendary point guard Dimitris Diamantidis in the future, but never quite lived up to those lofty expectations.

== Professional career ==
Bochoridis began his professional career with the historic Greek League club Aris Thessaloniki in 2010. With Aris, he played in the Greek Cup final in 2014. In July 2014, his player rights were sold to the EuroLeague powerhouse Panathinaikos for the sum of €350.000.

=== Panathinaikos (2014–2017) ===
On July 29, 2014, Panathinaikos announced the signing of Bochoridis to a five-year deal. The first statement of Bochoridis as a player of Panathinaikos, was that he was playing at the highest European level, and that he would do his best for the team. In his first season with Panathinaikos, he won the 2015 edition of the Greek Cup.

On September 23, 2015, he suffered a fractured fibula in a friendly game against Partizan, and he was subsequently ruled out of game action for at least a period of three months time. On 17 January 2016, he returned to action in a Greek League game, in a home win against his former club, Aris, which his team won by a score of 80–59. During the post-game press conference, Bochoridis stated that he was satisfied because of his return, and that he would do his best to help the team. In his second and third seasons with Panathinaikos, he won the 2016 edition and 2017 edition of the Greek Cup. With Panathinaikos, he also won the Greek League 2016–17 season championship.

=== Return to Aris (2017–2020) ===
Despite starting the 2017–2018 season with the Greens, Bochoridis eventually returned to Aris in December 2017. On July 28, 2018, he renewed his contract with Aris and was named team captain.

=== Second stint with Panathinaikos (2020–2023) ===
On July 23, 2020, Bochoridis made his return to Panathinaikos after two and a half years, as the club was going into a rebuilding phase. He averaged 4.4 points, 1.8 rebounds and 2.2 assists in 16 minutes per EuroLeague contest.

On July 26, 2021, he renewed his contract with the Greens for another year. In 30 league games, he averaged 4.8 points, 1.8 rebounds and 1.5 assists in 14 minutes per contest. Additionally, in 19 EuroLeague games, he averaged 2.1 points, 1 rebound and 1.3 assists in 11 minutes of play.

On August 2, 2022, Bochoridis re-signed for another season, his sixth overall with the club. In 29 league games, he averaged 3.6 points, 2.2 rebounds and 1.3 assists in 15 minutes per contest. Additionally, in 17 EuroLeague games, he averaged 2 points, 1.6 rebounds and 1.5 assists in 12 minutes of play.

On July 11, 2023, Bochoridis amicably parted ways with the Greek powerhouse for the second time in his career.

=== Third stint with Aris (2023–present) ===
On August 11, 2023, Bochoridis returned once more to his beloved Aris. On July 25, 2024, he renewed his contract for another season. On July 26, 2025, he renewed his contract for an additional two years.

== National team career ==
=== Greek junior national team ===
Bochoridis played with the junior national teams of Greece, at the 2011 FIBA Europe Under-18 Championship, and the 2012 FIBA Europe Under-18 Championship. He also played at both the 2013 FIBA Europe Under-20 Championship, and the 2014 FIBA Europe Under-20 Championship.

=== Greek senior national team ===
Bochoridis first became a member of the senior Greek national basketball team in 2018. He played at the 2019 FIBA World Cup qualification.

== Career statistics ==
Legend
GP	Games played	GS	Games started	MPG	Minutes per game
FG%	Field-goal percentage	3P%	3-point field-goal percentage	FT%	Free-throw percentage
RPG	Rebounds per game	APG	Assists per game	SPG	Steals per game
BPG	Blocks per game	PPG	Points per game	PIR	Performance index rating
**Bold**	Career high

=== EuroLeague ===
Year	Team	GP	GS	MPG	FG%	3P%	FT%	RPG	APG	SPG	BPG	PPG	PIR
2014–15	Panathinaikos	15	2	10.0	.400	.455	.333	1.0	1.3	.2	.0	2.0	1.3
2015–16	Panathinaikos	2	0	5.3	.000	.000	**1.000**	.0	0.5	.0	.0	1.0	1.0
2016–17	Panathinaikos	7	0	4.1	.200	**.750**	.500	.1	.0	.0	.0	1.7	.1
2020–21	Panathinaikos	**31**	4	**15.5**	**.341**	.298	.775	**1.8**	**2.2**	**.7**	**.2**	**4.4**	**4.0**
2021–22	Panathinaikos	19	**7**	11.4	.296	.241	.000	1.0	1.3	.3	.1	2.1	.2
2022–23	Panathinaikos	17	1	12.1	.317	.300	.286	1.6	1.5	.5	**.2**	2.0	2.4
Career		91	4	12.1	.310	.314	.661	1.3	1.5	0.5	.1	2.8	2.1

== Awards and accomplishments ==
- 2× Greek League Champion: (2017, 2021)
- 4× Greek Cup Winner: (2015, 2016, 2017, 2021)
- 3× Greek League All Star: (2018, 2019, 2020)
