= Sebas Saiz =

Spanish-Dominican basketball player (born 1994)

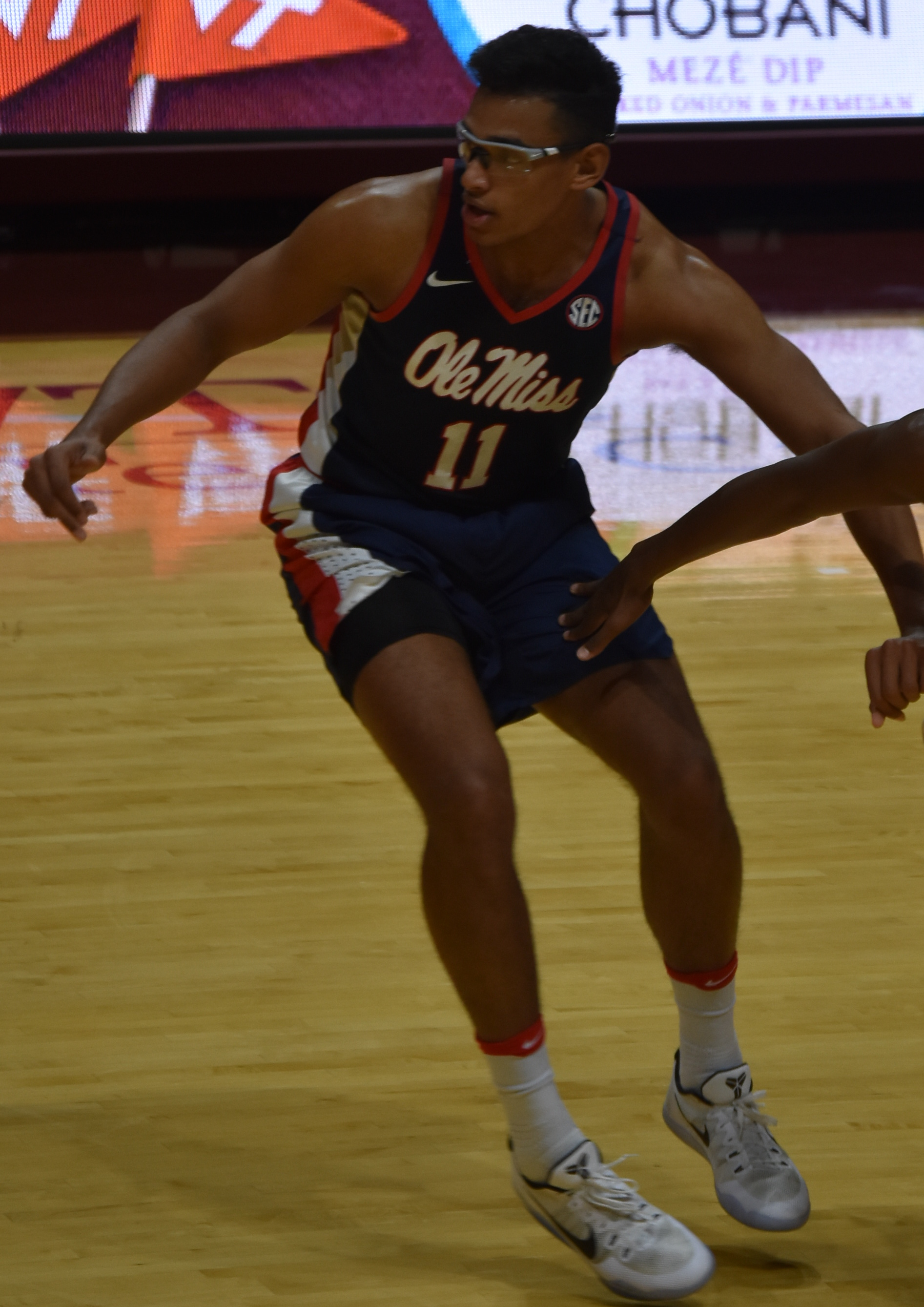
- Saiz playing for Ole Miss in 2016

No. 11 – Osaka Evessa
- Position: Center
- League: B.League

Personal information
- Born: 15 July 1994 (age 32) Madrid, Spain
- Listed height: 2.06 m (6 ft 9 in)
- Listed weight: 109 kg (240 lb)

Career information
- High school: Sunrise Christian Academy (Bel Aire, Kansas)
- College: Ole Miss (2013–2017)
- NBA draft: 2017: undrafted
- Playing career: 2017–present

Career history
- 2017–2019: Real Madrid
- 2017–2018: → Miraflores
- 2018–2019: → Canarias
- 2019–2020: Sun Rockers Shibuya
- 2020–2021: Chiba Jets
- 2021–2026: Alvark Tokyo
- 2026–present: Osaka Evessa

Career highlights
- B.League Finals MVP (2021); First-team All-SEC (2017); 2020 Japan Basketball League Dunk Contest Winner
Medals
Men's basketball
Representing Spain
EuroBasket
Gold medal – first place	2022 Czech Republic–Georgia–Italy–Germany
U20 European Championship
Silver medal – second place	2014 Greece	Team
Bronze medal – third place	2013 Estonia	Team

Juan Sebastián "Sebas" Saiz Soto (born 15 July 1994) is a Spanish professional basketball player for Osaka Evessa of the Japanese B.League. He played college basketball for the Ole Miss Rebels. Saiz also holds Dominican citizenship.

== Early years ==
Saiz, whose father is Spanish and his mother is from Dominican Republic, started playing basketball at the youth teams of Real Madrid, until transferring to CB Talavera for personal reasons. In 2009, he passed the trials to join Estudiantes, where he made his debut in senior competitions, playing in some Liga EBA games in 2011, at age 16.

== High school and college career ==
Saiz moved in 2012 to the United States to continue his basketball career, and in 2013 he joined the Ole Miss Rebels, averaging 5.1 points and 5.6 rebounds per game in his first season. He ended his college years becoming only the second player in school history after Murphy Holloway to surpass 1,000 points and 900 rebounds and was included in the All-Conference first team of the Southeastern Conference.

== Professional career ==
In July 2017, Saiz signed his first professional contract with Real Madrid, terminating previously with Estudiantes. One month later, he was loaned to San Pablo Burgos, debutant in the Spanish Liga ACB, where he averaged 9.1 points and 4.9 rebounds per game.

In July 2018, he was loaned to Iberostar Tenerife of the Liga ACB. He will make his debut in European competition as the Canarian team is qualified for the Basketball Champions League.

On August 1, 2019, Saiz signed with Sun Rockers Shibuya of the B.League.

On June 4, 2020, Saiz signed with Chiba Jets of the B.League.

On June 10, 2021, Saiz signed with Alvark Tokyo of the B.League. On June 21, 2022, he re-signed with Alvark Tokyo. On June 14, 2023, he re-signed with Alvark Tokyo. On June 12, 2024, he re-signed with Alvark Tokyo.

== International career ==
Saiz played with the Spanish youth teams, taking part of the under-19 team that finished in the fifth position at the 2013 World Championship.

With the under-20 team the European Championship, achieving a bronze medal in 2013 and a silver one in 2014.

He made his debut with Spain in November 2017, at the 2019 World Cup qualifying match played in Podgorica against Montenegro.
