= Malik Müller =

German basketball player (born 1994)

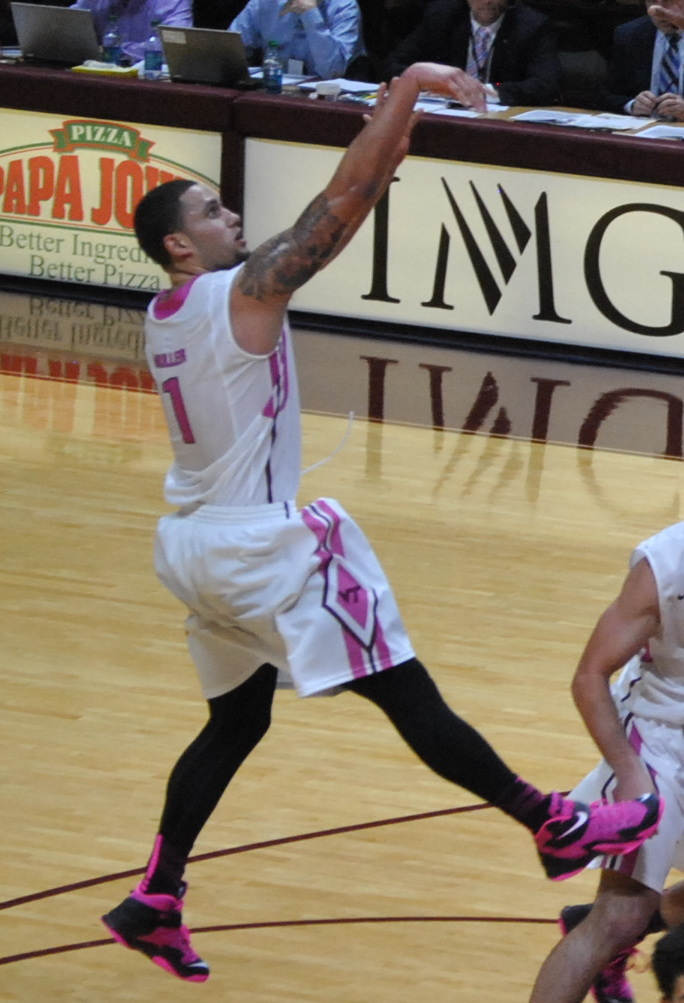

No. 12 – Hamburg Towers
- Position: Shooting guard
- League: Basketball Bundesliga

Personal information
- Born: January 24, 1994 (age 32) Frankfurt, Germany
- Listed height: 190 cm (6 ft 3 in)

Career information
- College: Virginia Tech (2014–2015)
- NBA draft: 2016: undrafted
- Playing career: 2010–present

Career history
- 2010–2013: Erdgas Ehingen/Urspringschule
- 2015–2017: Brose Bamberg
- 2015–2017: →Baunach Young Pikes
- 2017–2018: Göttingen
- 2018: Riesen Ludwigsburg
- 2018–present: Hamburg Towers

Career highlights
- ProA champion (2019); BBL champion (2016); BBL-Pokal winner (2017)

Malik Müller (born January 24, 1994) is a German professional basketball player for Hamburg Towers of the German Basketball Bundesliga.

== Professional career ==
In the 2015 offseason, Müller signed a three-year deal with Brose Bamberg. On December 11, 2017, he parted ways with Bamberg. The next day he signed with BG Göttingen for the rest of the season.

== International career ==
Born in Frankfurt, Germany, Müller was a part of the German U-17, U-18 and U-20 national team.
