= Gavin Schilling =

German basketball player (born 1995)

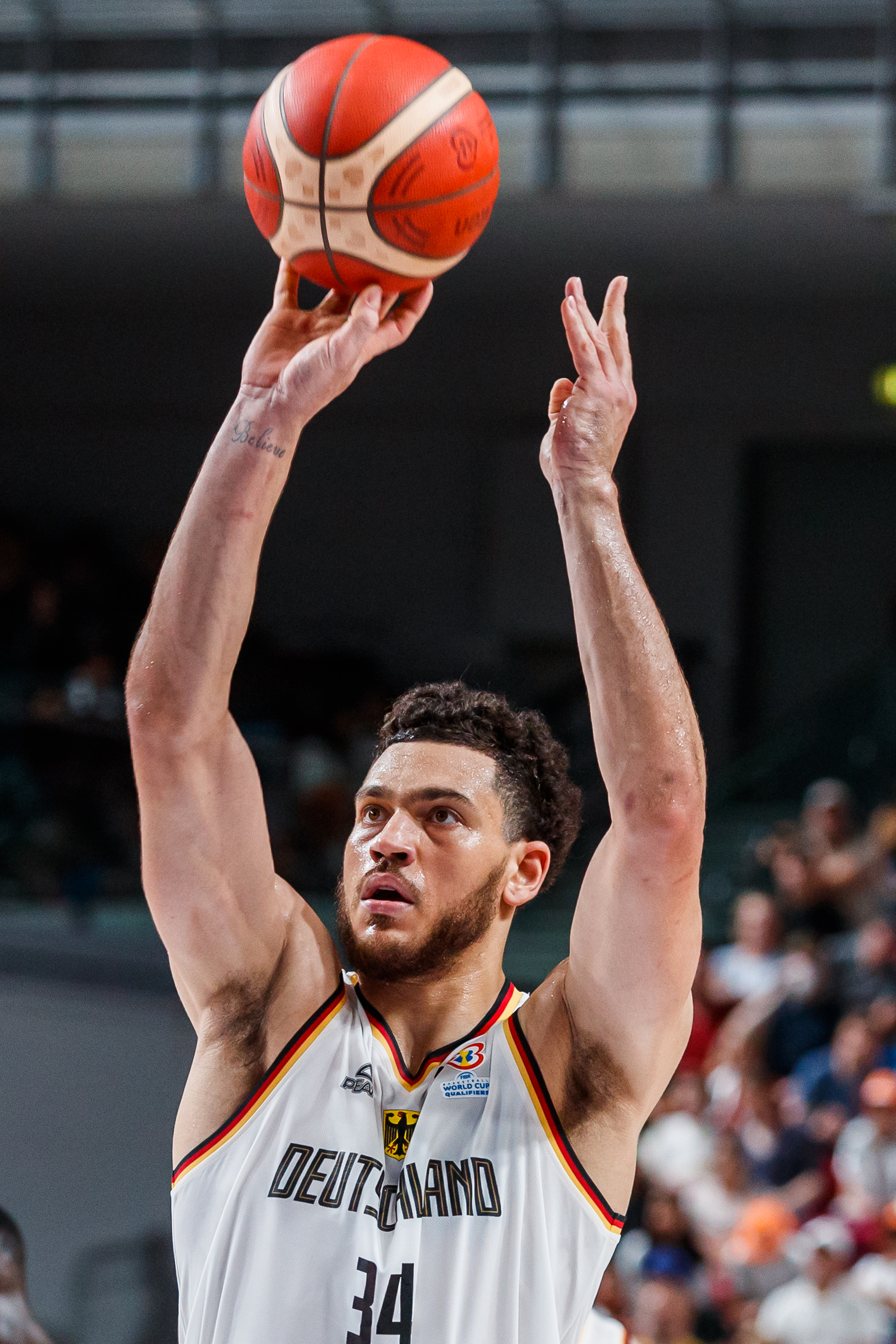
- Schilling with Germany in 2022

Free agent
- Position: Power forward

Personal information
- Born: November 10, 1995 (age 31) Munich, Germany
- Listed height: 6 ft 9 in (2.06 m)
- Listed weight: 250 lb (113 kg)

Career information
- High school: Findlay Prep (Henderson, Nevada)
- College: Michigan State (2013–2018)
- NBA draft: 2018: undrafted
- Playing career: 2018–present

Career history
- 2018–2020: Ratiopharm Ulm
- 2020–2021: Löwen Braunschweig
- 2021–2022: Bayern Munich
- 2022–2023: Limoges CSP
- 2023: Konyaspor
- 2023: Victoria Libertas Pesaro
- 2024–2025: Löwen Braunschweig
- 2025: Niners Chemnitz
- 2026: Riesen Ludwigsburg

Gavin Marcel Valentin Schilling (born November 10, 1995) is a German professional basketball player who last played for Riesen Ludwigsburg in the German Basketball Bundesliga (BBL). He stands 6’9’’ (206 cm) tall and plays power forward. Schilling played college basketball for the Michigan State Spartans.

== Early career ==
Born in Munich, Germany, Schilling grew up in Strasbourg, France, before moving to Chicago, Illinois, with his mother and brother in 2003.

He went to Lycée Français de Chicago until 2009. At that time, he played soccer, football, baseball and basketball.

Schilling moved to the Loyola Academy in Wilmette, Illinois, for the 2009–10 season, his freshman year of high school, where he played basketball and football.

He then moved to Germany and spent the 2010–11 season with SG Urspringschule/Schelklingen, helping the team win the German under-16 championship.

In 2011, Schilling returned to the US, enrolling at De La Salle Institute in Chicago for the 2011-12 campaign. He then moved on to Findlay Prep prior to the 2012–13 season. In March 2013, he committed to Michigan State.

As a freshman, Schilling made it to the NCAA Elite Eight with the Spartans and reached the NCAA Final Four his sophomore year. He missed the entire 2016–17 season due to a knee injury, which he sustained in October 2016. As a senior, Schilling averaged 2.9 points and 3.4 rebounds a game for the Spartans.

== Professional career ==
On June 29, 2018, he signed a deal with Ratiopharm Ulm of the German Basketball Bundesliga to get his professional career underway.

On July 31, 2020, he signed with Basketball Löwen Braunschweig of the Basketball Bundesliga (BBL).

On July 9, 2021, he signed with Bayern Munich of the German Bundesliga. On August 1, 2022, he signed a deal with French LNB Pro A outfit Limoges CSP. He transferred to Konyaspor of the Basketbol Süper Ligi on January 31, 2023.

On July 27, 2023, he signed with Victoria Libertas Pesaro of the Italian Lega Basket Serie A (LBA). In July 2024, he returned to the Basketball Löwen Braunschweig team.

On July 5, 2024, he signed with Basketball Löwen Braunschweig in the German Basketball Bundesliga (BBL).

== International career ==
Schilling played the Albert-Schweitzer-Tournament with the German under-18 national team in 2012 and attended the under-18 European Championships in Latvia and Lithuania the same year.

== Personal life ==
Schilling speaks three languages: English, German and French.

His father Andreas is a former German professional handball player, his mother is a native of Chicago.
