= Dominic Lockhart =

German basketball player (born 1994)

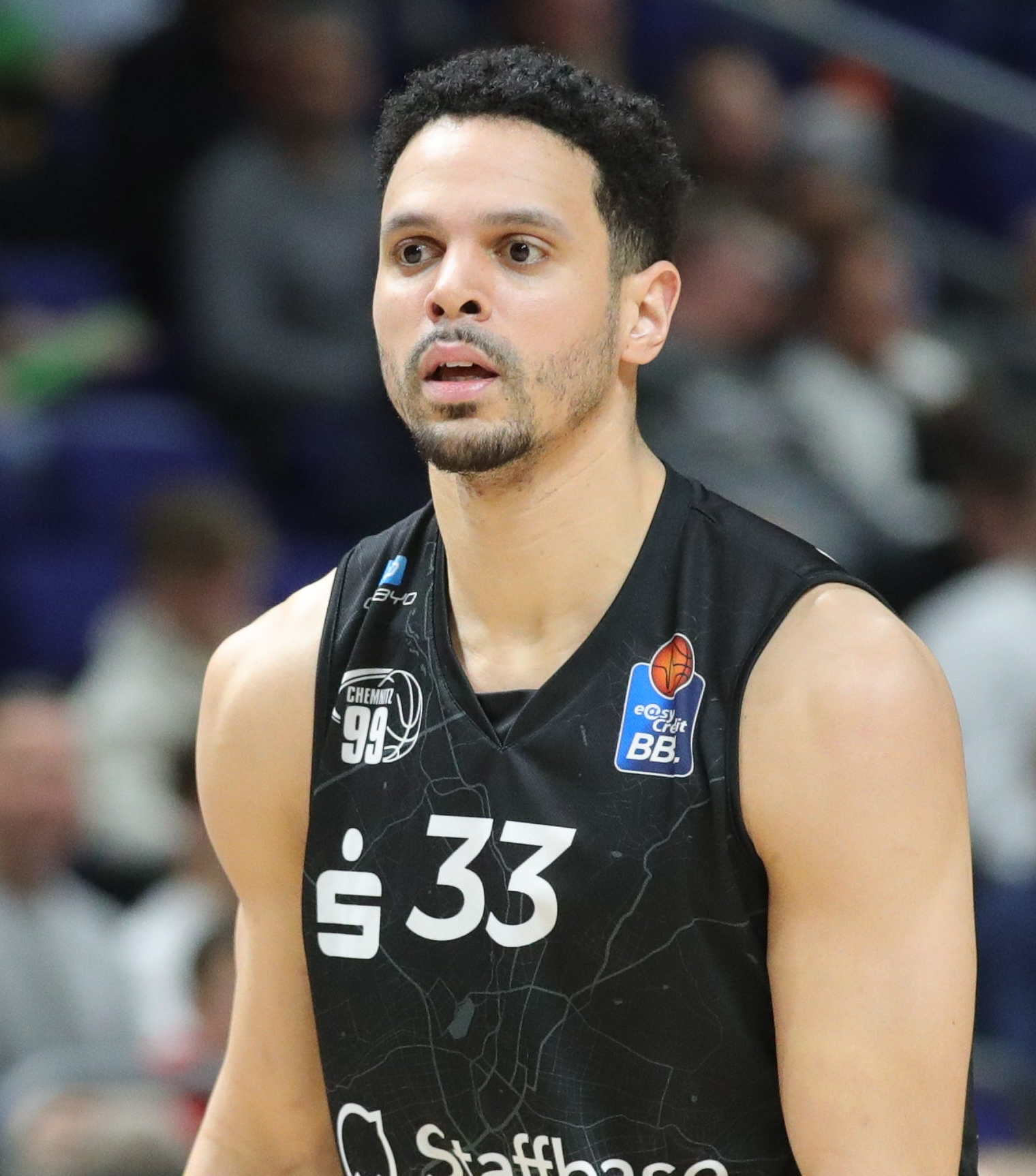
- Lockhart in 2023

No. 3 – Rostock Seawolves
- Position: Shooting guard
- League: Basketball Bundesliga; EuroCup

Personal information
- Born: July 3, 1994 (age 32) Schweinfurt, Germany
- Listed height: 201 cm (6 ft 7 in)
- Listed weight: 97 kg (214 lb)

Career information
- NBA draft: 2013: undrafted
- Playing career: 2010–present

Career history
- 2010–2013: Gießen 46ers
- 2013–2017: EWE Baskets Oldenburg
- 2017–2020: BG Göttingen
- 2020–2022: Brose Bamberg
- 2022–2024: Niners Chemnitz
- 2024–present: Rostock Seawolves

Career highlights
- FIBA Europe Cup champion (2024)

Dominic Lockhart (born July 3, 1994) is a German professional basketball player for Rostock Seawolves of the Basketball Bundesliga (BBL) and the EuroCup.

== Professional career ==
Lockhart played his youth basketball with the Gießen 46ers. He joined the EWE Baskets Oldenburg in 2013. In 2017, he signed with BG Göttingen. Lockhart averaged 6.4 points, 3.2 rebounds and 1.7 assists per game in the 2017-18 season. On May 30, 2018, he signed a two-year extension with the team.

On July 14, 2020, he has signed with Brose Bamberg of the Basketball Bundesliga (BBL).

On June 16, 2022, Lockhart signed with Niners Chemnitz of the Basketball Bundesliga.

On June 20, 2024, he signed with Rostock Seawolves of the Basketball Bundesliga (BBL).

== International career ==
Lockhart was a part of the German U-17, U-18 and U-20 national team.
