= 2011 FIBA Europe Under-18 Championship =

International basketball competition

2011 EuroBasket Under-18
28th FIBA Europe Under-18 Championship

Tournament details
- Host country: Poland
- Dates: 21–31 July 2011
- Teams: 16
- Venue(s): 2 (in 1 host city)

Final positions
- Champions: Spain (3rd title)

Tournament statistics
- MVP: (Spain) Alejandro Abrines Redondo
- Top scorer: (Czech Republic) Kríz (19.0)
- Top rebounds: (Czech Republic) Kríz (11.7)
- Top assists: (Slovenia) Rupnik (5.7)
- PPG (Team): Lithuania (77.8)
- RPG (Team): Poland (45.0)
- APG (Team): Spain (15.3)

Official website
- Official website (archive)

The 2011 FIBA Europe Under-18 Championship was the 28th edition of the FIBA Europe Under-18 Championship. 16 teams featured the competition, held in Poland from July 21–31. Lithuania were the defending champion. Spain won their third title.

== Teams ==
- Croatia
- Czech Republic
- Finland
- France
- Germany
- Greece
- Italy
- Latvia
- Lithuania
- Poland
- Russia
- Serbia
- Slovenia
- Spain
- Turkey
- Ukraine

== Group stages ==
=== Preliminary round ===
In this round, the sixteen teams were allocated in four groups of four teams each. The top three advanced to the qualifying round. The last team of each group played for the 13th–16th place in the Classification Games.

Team advance to Qualifying Round
Team compete in Classification Round

Times given below are in CEST (UTC+2).

==== Group A ====
Team	Pld	W	L	PF	PA	PD	Pts	Tiebreaker
Croatia	3	3	0	199	167	+32	6	
Poland	3	2	1	229	197	+32	5	
Slovenia	3	1	2	174	213	−39	4	
Greece	3	0	3	170	195	−25	3	

21 July 2011
18:00

Report

Greece	45–61	Croatia
Scoring by quarter: 7–14, 9–18, 12–13, 17–16
Pts: Tselentakis 11; Rebs: Kamperidis 8 Asts: Larentzakis 3		Pts: Ramljak 16; Rebs: Ramljak, Brzoja 10; Asts: Brzoja 4

Orbita Hall, Wrocław
Attendance: 150
Referees: Jose Martin (ESP), Anton Makhlin (RUS), Johann Jeanneau (FRA)

21 July 2011
20:15

Report

Slovenia	58–89	Poland
Scoring by quarter: 13–23, 20–19, 12–20, 13–27
Pts: Osolni 13; Rebs: Osolni 8 Asts: Rupnik 6		Pts: Ponitka 22; Rebs: Niedzwiedzki 10; Asts: Grzelinski, Matczak 5

Orbita Hall, Wrocław
Attendance: 3,000
Referees: Volodymyr Drabikovsky (UKR), Mindaugas Vecerskis (LTU), Emin Mogulkoc (TUR)

22 July 2011
15:45

Report

Croatia	60–50	Slovenia
Scoring by quarter: 8–16, 20–9, 13–14, 19–11
Pts: Čubrić 15; Rebs: Ramljak, Brzola 13; Asts: Čubrić 4		Pts: Rupnik 13; Rebs: Dimec 12; Asts: Rupnik 6

Wrocław University of P.E., Wrocław
Attendance: 100
Referees: Marco Giansanti (ITA), Henri Hilke (FIN), Omer Esteron (ISR)

22 July 2011
20:15

Report

Poland	68–61	Greece
Scoring by quarter: 19–15, 20–15, 13–23, 16–8
Pts: Ponitka 17; Rebs: Karnowski 9 Asts: Grochowski 5		Pts: Larentzakis 17; Rebs: Kamperidis 9 Asts: Zoumpos 3

Orbita Hall, Wrocław
Attendance: 3,000
Referees: Branislav Mrdak (SRB), Toni Rodriguez (GER), Sean David Myers (AUS)

23 July 2011
20:15

Report

Slovenia	66–64	Greece
Scoring by quarter: 17–17, 17–16, 19–10, 13–21
Pts: Rupnik 14; Rebs: Rojc 8 Asts: Rupnik 5		Pts: Tselentakis 11; Rebs: Tselentakis 10; Asts: Deligeorgis 5

Wrocław University of P.E., Wrocław
Attendance: 100
Referees: Ivo Dolinek (CZE), Juris Kokainis (LAT), Igor Mitrovski (MKD)

23 July 2011
20:15

Report

Croatia	78–72	Poland
Scoring by quarter: 20–27, 14–10, 19–14, 25–21
Pts: Brzoja 22; Rebs: Krstanović 11; Asts: Brzoja 4		Pts: Ponitka 18; Rebs: Karnowski 11; Asts: Grochowski 8

Orbita Hall, Wrocław
Attendance: 3,500
Referees: Ognjen Jokić (MNE), Johann Jeanneau (FRA), Sean David Myers (AUS)

==== Group B ====
Team	Pld	W	L	PF	PA	PD	Pts	Tiebreaker
Serbia	3	2	1	246	185	+61	5	1–1, +9
Turkey	3	2	1	235	200	+35	5	1–1, +5
Germany	3	2	1	210	192	+18	5	1–1, −14
Finland	3	0	3	162	276	−112	3	

21 July 2011
13:30

Report

Finland	49–101	Serbia
Scoring by quarter: 12–24, 12–23, 12–26, 13–28
Pts: Cavén 22; Rebs: Dolenc 5 Asts: Seppälä 2		Pts: Popovski-Turanjanin 22; Rebs: Mitrović 8 Asts: Mitrović 6

Orbita Hall, Wrocław
Attendance: 100
Referees: Juris Kokainis (LAT), Serghei Tislenco (MDA), Petros Papapetrou (GRE)

21 July 2011
15:45

Report

Germany	68–66	Turkey
Scoring by quarter: 13–18, 19–19, 25–13, 11–16
Pts: Bekteshi 15; Rebs: Zipser 8 Asts: Schröder 4		Pts: Candan 16; Rebs: Dokuyan 7 Asts: Eroğlu 5

Orbita Hall, Wrocław
Attendance: 100
Referees: Marco Giansanti (ITA), Marin Mehandjiev (BUL), Tomislav Kovačić (SLO)

22 July 2011
13:30

Report

Turkey	87–57	Finland
Scoring by quarter: 14–18, 30–10, 20–16, 23–13
Pts: Erülkü, Dokuyan 14; Rebs: Altunbey, Dokuyan 6 Asts: Eroğlu, Sipahi 3		Pts: Naapi 15; Rebs: Luoma 6 Asts: Naapi 4

Wrocław University of P.E., Wrocław
Attendance: 100
Referees: Ivo Dolinek (CZE), Igor Mitrovski (MKD), Piotr Pastusiak (POL)

22 July 2011
20:15

Report

Serbia	70–54	Germany
Scoring by quarter: 23–14, 16–12, 13–13, 18–15
Pts: Popovski-Turanjanin 14; Rebs: three players 6 Asts: Micić 9		Pts: Radosavljević 15; Rebs: Radosavljević, Schröder 15; Asts: Schröder 3

Wrocław University of P.E., Wrocław
Attendance: 100
Referees: Luis Lopes (POR), Marek Cmikiewicz (POL), Johann Jeanneau (FRA)

23 July 2011
15:45

Report

Finland	56–88	Germany
Scoring by quarter: 17–16, 7–25, 18–24, 14–23
Pts: Cavén 13; Rebs: Naapi 7 Asts: Tarjanne 2		Pts: Bekteshi 18; Rebs: Radosavljević 15; Asts: Bekteshi, Hartmann 4

Wrocław University of P.E., Wrocław
Attendance: 100
Referees: Volodymyr Drabikovsky (UKR), Tomislav Hordov (CRO), Marin Mehandjiev (BUL)

23 July 2011
15:45

Report

Turkey	82–75	Serbia
Scoring by quarter: 25–22, 17–16, 18–24, 22–13
Pts: Erülkü 21; Rebs: Geyik 6 Asts: Eroğlu 4		Pts: Micić 19; Rebs: Janković 15; Asts: Micić 5

Orbita Hall, Wrocław
Attendance: 150
Referees: Jose Martin (ESP), Anton Makhlin (RUS), Mindaugas Vecerskis (LTU)

==== Group C ====
Team	Pld	W	L	PF	PA	PD	Pts	Tiebreaker
Spain	3	3	0	235	181	+54	6	
France	3	2	1	200	166	+34	5	
Latvia	3	1	2	176	191	−16	4	
Czech Republic	3	0	3	154	226	−72	3	

21 July 2011
13:30

Report

Czech Republic	60–84	Spain
Scoring by quarter: 23–27, 15–16, 10–24, 12–17
Pts: Kríz 20; Rebs: Kríz 11; Asts: Festr 6		Pts: Fernández 17; Rebs: Sanz, Hernangómez 6 Asts: Fernández 8

Wrocław University of P.E., Wrocław
Attendance: 200
Referees: Marek Cmikiewicz (POL), Igor Mitrovski (MKD), Toni Rodriguez (GER)

21 July 2011
15:45

Report

Latvia	46–66	France
Scoring by quarter: 9–9, 12–13, 7–21, 18–23
Pts: Silins 15; Rebs: Bērziņš 8 Asts: Reinfelds, Bērziņš 2		Pts: Adjagba, Howard 14; Rebs: Jaiteh, Dinal 12; Asts: Invernizzi 3

Wrocław University of P.E., Wrocław
Attendance: 200
Referees: Ognjen Jokić (MNE), Omer Esteron (ISR), Henri Hilke (FIN)

22 July 2011
13:30

Report

Spain	79–58	Latvia
Scoring by quarter: 18–8, 25–11, 22–18, 14–21
Pts: Abrines 16; Rebs: Díez 8 Asts: Pérez 5		Pts: Bērziņš 13; Rebs: Grazulis 6 Asts: Reinfelds 5

Orbita Hall, Wrocław
Attendance: 50
Referees: Volodymyr Drabikovsky (UKR), Marin Mehandjiev (BUL), Tomislav Hordov (CRO)

22 July 2011
18:00

Report

France	71–48	Czech Republic
Scoring by quarter: 22–10, 14–17, 17–10, 18111
Pts: Invernizzi 12; Rebs: Dinal 11; Asts: three players 3		Pts: Herman 11; Rebs: Kyzlink 10; Asts: three players 2

Wrocław University of P.E., Wrocław
Attendance: 100
Referees: Anton Makhlin (RUS), Emin Mogulkoc (TUR), Mindaugas Vecerskis (LTU)

23 July 2011
13:30

Report

Czech Republic	46–71	Latvia
Scoring by quarter: 14–28, 9–16, 8–12, 15–15
Pts: Kyzlink 14; Rebs: Kyzlink 9 Asts: Svandrlík 3		Pts: Bērziņš 12; Rebs: Grazulis 14; Asts: Krumins 5

Orbita Hall, Wrocław
Attendance: 50
Referees: Marco Giansanti (ITA), Tomislav Kovačić (SLO), Piotr Pastusiak (POL)

23 July 2011
18:00

Report

France	63–72	Spain
Scoring by quarter: 18–23, 15–15, 13–12, 17–22
Pts: Jaiteh 14; Rebs: Jaiteh 10; Asts: Faroux 3		Pts: Díez 15; Rebs: Díez 10; Asts: Fernández 6

Orbita Hall, Wrocław
Attendance: 500
Referees: Petros Papapetrou (GRE), Branislav Mrdak (SRB), Serghei Tislenco (MDA)

==== Group D ====
Team	Pld	W	L	PF	PA	PD	Pts	Tiebreaker
Lithuania	3	3	0	248	208	+40	6	
Italy	3	2	1	253	210	+43	5	
Russia	3	1	2	201	225	−24	4	
Ukraine	3	0	3	184	244	−60	3	

21 July 2011
18:00

Report

Ukraine	51–84	Lithuania
Scoring by quarter: 13–28, 9–19, 17–23, 12–14
Pts: Zuikov, Artamonov 15; Rebs: Gerun, Artamonov 4 Asts: Artamonov 4		Pts: Gudaitis 14; Rebs: Lekūnas 11; Asts: Semaska 5

Wrocław University of P.E., Wrocław
Attendance: 200
Referees: Ivo Dolinek (CZE), Luis Lopes (POR), Tomislav Hordov (CRO)

21 July 2011
20:15

Report

Italy	89–48	Russia
Scoring by quarter: 27–13, 22–13, 26–15, 14–7
Pts: Della Valle 20; Rebs: Chillo 9 Asts: Imbrò 6		Pts: Goldyrev 19; Rebs: Gudumak 10; Asts: seven players 1

Wrocław University of P.E., Wrocław
Attendance: 200
Referees: Branislav Mrdak (SRB), Sean David Myers (AUS), Piotr Pastusiak (POL)

22 July 2011
15:45

Report

Russia	75–54	Ukraine
Scoring by quarter: 20–10, 19–13, 24–22, 12–9
Pts: Gudumak 21; Rebs: Gudumak, Trushkin 10; Asts: three players 4		Pts: Zuikov 11; Rebs: Zagreba 6 Asts: Artamonov, Gerun 3

Orbita Hall, Wrocław
Attendance: 100
Referees: Ognjen Jokić (MNE), Juris Kokainis (LAT), Tomislav Kovačić (SLO)

22 July 2011
18:00

Report

Lithuania	82–79	Italy
Scoring by quarter: 23–19, 22–17, 16–17, 21–26
Pts: Olisevičius 23; Rebs: Kymantas 7 Asts: Paliukėnas 6		Pts: Della Valle 24; Rebs: Tessitori 8 Asts: Monaldi, Imbrò 3

Orbita Hall, Wrocław
Attendance: 150
Referees: Jose Martin (ESP), Petros Papapetrou (GRE), Serghei Tislenco (MDA)

23 July 2011
13:30

Report

Ukraine	80–85	Italy
Scoring by quarter: 20–21, 17–17, 20–22, 23–25
Pts: Gerun 29; Rebs: Gerun 14; Asts: Artamonov, Zuikov 5		Pts: Della Valle 20; Rebs: Giovara 9 Asts: Imbrò 5

Wrocław University of P.E., Wrocław
Attendance: 100
Referees: Luis Lopes (POR), Toni Rodriguez (GER), Henri Hilke (FIN)

23 July 2011
18:00

Report

Russia	78–82	Lithuania
Scoring by quarter: 18–14, 15–19, 25–21, 20–28
Pts: Trushkin 21; Rebs: Trushkin 13; Asts: Rodionov 5		Pts: Semaska 17; Rebs: Kymantas 12; Asts: Paliukenas 4

Wrocław University of P.E., Wrocław
Attendance: 100
Referees: Marek Cmikiewicz (POL), Emin Mogulkoc (TUR), Omer Esteron (ISR)

=== Qualifying round ===
The twelve teams remaining were allocated in two groups of six teams each. The four top teams advance to the quarterfinals. The last two teams of each group played for the 9th–12th place.

Team advance to Quarterfinals
Team compete in 9th–12th playoffs

==== Group E ====
Team	Pld	W	L	PF	PA	PD	Pts	Tiebreaker
Poland	5	4	1	375	321	+54	9	
Turkey	5	3	2	343	332	+11	8	2–0
Serbia	5	3	2	371	338	+33	8	1–1
Croatia	5	3	2	315	329	−14	8	0–2
Slovenia	5	1	4	303	339	−36	6	1–0
Germany	5	1	4	311	359	−48	6	0–1

25 July 2011
13:30

Report

Slovenia	73–81	Serbia
Scoring by quarter: 19–18, 19–22, 19–20, 16–21
Pts: Dimec 26; Rebs: Dimec 9 Asts: Rupnik 6		Pts: Dangubić, Milošević 15; Rebs: Mitrović 6 Asts: Miljenović 7

Orbita Hall, Wrocław
Attendance: 50
Referees: Ognjen Jokić (MNE), Juris Kokainis (LAT), Serghei Tislenco (MDA)

25 July 2011
18:00

Report

Turkey	59–62	Poland
Scoring by quarter: 24–18, 17–13, 11–17, 7–14
Pts: Candan, Geyik 11; Rebs: Sipahi 9 Asts: Eroğlu 3		Pts: Ponitka 14; Rebs: Michalak 13; Asts: Michalak 5

Orbita Hall, Wrocław
Attendance: 2,500
Referees: Marco Giansanti (ITA), Anton Makhlin (RUS), Marin Mehandjiev (BUL)

25 July 2011
20:15

Report

Germany	51–52	Croatia
Scoring by quarter: 10–14, 10–10, 15–13, 16–15
Pts: Radosavljević, Schröder 11; Rebs: Radosavljević, Schröder 6 Asts: Schröder 4		Pts: Brzoja 22; Rebs: Krstanovic 8 Asts: Ramljak 3

Orbita Hall, Wrocław
Attendance: 100
Referees: Jose Martin (ESP), Luis Lopes (POR), Omer Esteron (ISR)

26 July 2011
18:00

Report

Poland	70–61	Serbia
Scoring by quarter: 19–14, 12–15, 23–16, 16–16
Pts: Niedzwiedzki 22; Rebs: Ponitka 10; Asts: Michalak, Grochowski 3		Pts: Micić 13; Rebs: Bezbradica 6 Asts: Miljenović 3

Orbita Hall, Wrocław
Attendance: 2,000
Referees: Jose Martin (ESP), Luis Lopes (POR), Mindaugas Vecerskis (LTU)

26 July 2011
20:15

Report

Croatia	66–72	Turkey
Scoring by quarter: 18–19, 14–20, 17–25, 17–8
Pts: Ramljak 17; Rebs: Brzoja 7 Asts: Ramljak 8		Pts: Sipahi 16; Rebs: Candan 9 Asts: Dokuyan 5

Orbita Hall, Wrocław
Attendance: 200
Referees: Petros Papapetrou (GRE), Juris Kokainis (LAT), Johann Jeanneau (FRA)

26 July 2011
20:15

Report

Germany	65–69	Slovenia
Scoring by quarter: 14–15, 9–25, 22–13, 20–16
Pts: Schröder 19; Rebs: Radosavljevic 10; Asts: Schröder 4		Pts: Rupnik 24; Rebs: Osolnik 8 Asts: Rupnik 4

Wrocław University of P.E., Wrocław
Attendance: 100
Referees: Marco Giansanti (ITA), Igor Mitrovski (MKD), Henri Hilke (FIN)

27 July 2011
15:45

Report

Serbia	84–59	Croatia
Scoring by quarter: 18–18, 29–18, 24–11, 13–12
Pts: Popovski-Turanjanin, Micic 12; Rebs: three players 6 Asts: Micić 12		Pts: Brzoja 14; Rebs: Krstanović 5 Asts: Čubrić 3

Orbita Hall, Wrocław
Attendance: 300
Referees: Marco Giansanti (ITA), Anton Makhlin (RUS), Marin Mehandjiev (BUL)

27 July 2011
18:00

Report

Poland	82–65	Germany
Scoring by quarter: 21–13, 23–17, 25–18, 13–17
Pts: Michalak, Koelner 17; Rebs: three players 6 Asts: Szymkiewicz 5		Pts: Bekteshi 16; Rebs: Radosavljević, Zipser 6 Asts: Schröder 6

Orbita Hall, Wrocław
Attendance: 2,500
Referees: Juris Kokainis (LAT), Johann Jeanneau (FRA), Henri Hilke (FIN)

27 July 2011
18:00

Report

Turkey	64–61	Slovenia
Scoring by quarter: 12–16, 23–11, 10–14, 19–20
Pts: Candan 18; Rebs: Candan, Özen 5 Asts: Eroğlu 5		Pts: Rupnik 17; Rebs: Dimec 7 Asts: Rupnik 5

Wrocław University of P.E., Wrocław
Attendance: 100
Referees: Jose Martin (ESP), Serghei Tislenco (MDA), Mindaugas Vecerskis (LTU)

==== Group F ====
Team	Pld	W	L	PF	PA	PD	Pts	Tiebreaker
Spain	5	5	0	402	321	+81	10	
France	5	4	1	333	306	+27	9	
Lithuania	5	3	2	381	347	+34	8	
Italy	5	2	3	389	258	+31	7	
Russia	5	1	4	319	400	−81	6	
Latvia	5	0	5	296	388	−92	5	

25 July 2011
15:45

Report

Italy	70–72	France
Scoring by quarter: 18–23, 17–19, 22–16, 13–14
Pts: Della Valle 26; Rebs: Tessitori 7 Asts: Della Valle 4		Pts: Jaiteh 12; Rebs: Dinal, Jaiteh 10; Asts: John 4

Orbita Hall, Wrocław
Attendance: 100
Referees: Petros Papapetrou (GRE), Tomislav Hordov (CRO), Igor Mitrovski (MKD)

25 July 2011
18:00

Report

Russia	59–94	Spain
Scoring by quarter: 18–19, 11–24, 14–26, 16–25
Pts: Gudumak 22; Rebs: Gudumak 9 Asts: seven players 1		Pts: Abrines 21; Rebs: Díez 8 Asts: Fernández 5

Wrocław University of P.E., Wrocław
Attendance: 100
Referees: Ivo Dolinek (CZE), Piotr Pastusiak (POL), Tomislav Kovačić (SLO)

25 July 2011
20:15

Report

Latvia	45–86	Lithuania
Scoring by quarter: 16–27, 10–20, 12–19, 7–20
Pts: Strazdins 8 Rebs: Sipolins 8 Asts: Reinfelds, Bērziņš 2		Pts: Mockevicius 13; Rebs: Gudaitis 10; Asts: Semaska 2

Wrocław University of P.E., Wrocław
Attendance: 100
Referees: Volodymyr Drabikovsky (UKR), Emin Mogulkoc (TUR), Henri Hilke (FIN)

26 July 2011
13:30

Report

Spain	73–66	Italy
Scoring by quarter: 23–13, 9–13, 23–26, 18–14
Pts: Díez 17; Rebs: Díez 12; Asts: Fernández 7		Pts: Imbrò, Magrini 13; Rebs: Chillo 10; Asts: Della Valle 3

Orbita Hall, Wrocław
Attendance: 50
Referees: Volodymyr Drabikovsky (UKR), Emin Mogulkoc (TUR), Serghei Tislenco (MDA)

26 July 2011
15:45

Report

Russia	72–64	Latvia
Scoring by quarter: 16–18, 21–18, 11–8, 24–20
Pts: Gudumak 17; Rebs: Gudumak 16; Asts: three players 3		Pts: Silins, Ginters 13; Rebs: Grazulis 8 Asts: Reinfelds 5

Orbita Hall, Wrocław
Attendance: 80
Referees: Marek Cmikiewicz (POL), Branislav Mrdak (SRB), Toni Rodriguez (GER)

26 July 2011
18:00

Report

France	61–56	Lithuania
Scoring by quarter: 11–16, 15–8, 15–16, 20–19
Pts: Jaiteh 15; Rebs: Jean-Charles, Jaiteh 9 Asts: Invernizzi 5		Pts: Semaska 18; Rebs: Gudaitis 11; Asts: Semaska 3

Wrocław University of P.E., Wrocław
Attendance: 100
Referees: Ivo Dolinek (CZE), Piotr Pastusiak (POL), Sean David Myers (AUS)

27 July 2011
13:30

Report

France	71–62	Russia
Scoring by quarter: 24–16, 12–23, 16–12, 19–11
Pts: Howard 15; Rebs: Jaiteh 10; Asts: John 5		Pts: Gudumak 16; Rebs: Trushkin 8 Asts: Rodionov 6

Orbita Hall, Wrocław
Attendance: 100
Referees: Marek Cmikiewicz (POL), Volodymyr Drabikovsky (UKR), Tomislav Kovačić (SLO)

27 July 2011
20:15

Report

Lithuania	75–84	Spain
Scoring by quarter: 22–32, 18–18, 20–17, 15–17
Pts: Kymantas 23; Rebs: Kymantas 9 Asts: Grigonis, Lekavicius 3		Pts: Fernández, Díez 19; Rebs: Díez 17; Asts: Sanz 4

Orbita Hall, Wrocław
Attendance: 200
Referees: Petros Papapetrou (GRE), Branislav Mrdak (SRB), Tomislav Hordov (CRO)

27 July 2011
20:15

Report

Italy	85–83 (OT)	Latvia
Scoring by quarter: 23–22, 12–22, 14–16, 28–17, Overtime: 8–6
Pts: Chillo 21; Rebs: Chillo 7 Asts: Monaldi 2		Pts: Silins 16; Rebs: Bērziņš 11; Asts: Reinfelds 6

Wrocław University of P.E., Wrocław
Attendance: 100
Referees: Ivo Dolinek (CZE), Ognjen Jokić (MNE), Toni Rodriguez (GER)

=== Classification round ===
The last teams of each group in the preliminary round competed in this Classification Round. The four teams played in one group. The last two teams were relegated to Division B for the next season.

Team will be relegated to Division B.

==== Group G ====
Team	Pld	W	L	PF	PA	PD	Pts	Tiebreaker
Ukraine	6	5	1	361	342	+19	11	
Greece	6	4	2	477	408	+69	10	
Czech Republic	6	2	4	342	370	−28	8	
Finland	6	1	5	375	435	−60	7	

25 July 2011
13:30

Report

Greece	93–67	Ukraine
Scoring by quarter: 21–21, 25–12, 14–18, 33–16
Pts: Larentzakis 31; Rebs: Deligeorgis 10; Asts: Deligeorgis 7		Pts: Gerun 23; Rebs: Gerun 7 Asts: Gerun, Artamonov 3

Wrocław University of P.E., Wrocław
Attendance: 100
Referees: Marek Cmikiewicz (POL), Johann Jeanneau (FRA), Mindaugas Vecerskis (LTU)

25 July 2011
15:45

Report

Finland	55–72	Czech Republic
Scoring by quarter: 18–19, 15–13, 11–21, 11–19
Pts: Seppälä 13; Rebs: Cavén 8 Asts: Naapi 3		Pts: Kríz 21; Rebs: Kríz 22; Asts: Kríz 5

Wrocław University of P.E., Wrocław
Attendance: 100
Referees: Branislav Mrdak (SRB), Sean David Myers (AUS), Toni Rodriguez (GER)

26 July 2011
13:30

Report

Czech Republic	72–100	Greece
Scoring by quarter: 20–17, 21–30, 13–30, 18–23
Pts: Kyzlink, Svandrlík 10; Rebs: Herman 8 Asts: four players 2		Pts: Larentzakis 29; Rebs: Melissaratos 8 Asts: Deligeorgis 14

Wrocław University of P.E., Wrocław
Attendance: 100
Referees: Tomislav Hordov (CRO), Anton Makhlin (RUS), Omer Esteron (ISR)

26 July 2011
15:45

Report

Ukraine	75–65 (OT)	Finland
Scoring by quarter: 15–17, 19–12, 15–17, 14–17, Overtime: 12–2
Pts: Zuikov 23; Rebs: Gerun 20; Asts: Artamonov 4		Pts: Dolenc 23; Rebs: Cavén 11; Asts: Iikka Mäki, Tommi Huolila 2

Wrocław University of P.E., Wrocław
Attendance: 100
Referees: Ognjen Jokić (MNE), Tomislav Kovačić (SLO), Marin Mehandjiev (BUL)

27 July 2011
13:30

Report

Greece	78–87	Finland
Scoring by quarter: 21–16, 19–26, 15–25, '23–20
Pts: Larentzakis 20; Rebs: Maragkos 9 Asts: Larentzakis 3		Pts: Cavén 26; Rebs: Huolila 5 Asts: Naapi 4

Wrocław University of P.E., Wrocław
Attendance: 100
Referees: Igor Mitrovski (MKD), Luis Lopes (POR), Sean David Myers (AUS)

27 July 2011
15:45

Report

Czech Republic	72–76	Ukraine
Scoring by quarter: 21–14, 15–27, 20–16, 16–19
Pts: Kríz 32; Rebs: Kríz 16; Asts: three players 3		Pts: Artamonov 20; Rebs: Gerun 9 Asts: Artamonov 6

Wrocław University of P.E., Wrocław
Attendance: 100
Referees: Emin Mogulkoc (TUR), Piotr Pastusiak (POL), Omer Esteron (ISR)

29 July 2011
13:30

Report

Ukraine	68–60	Greece
Scoring by quarter: 19–19, 19–10, 13–15, 17–16
Pts: Artamonov 21; Rebs: Gerun 18; Asts: Artamonov 6		Pts: Melissaratos 18; Rebs: Melissaratos 10; Asts: Deligeorgis 6

Wrocław University of P.E., Wrocław
Attendance: 100
Referees: Branislav Mrdak (SRB), Mindaugas Vecerskis (LTU), Serghei Tislenco (MDA)

29 July 2011
15:45

Report

Czech Republic	67–61	Finland
Scoring by quarter: 21–12, 15–15, 15–17, 16–17
Pts: Kríz 25; Rebs: Kríz 14; Asts: Kríz, Kyzlink 3		Pts: Cavén 19; Rebs: Cavén 12; Asts: Naapi 4

Wrocław University of P.E., Wrocław
Attendance: 100
Referees: Juris Kokainis (LAT), Marin Mehandjiev (BUL), Igor Mitrovski (MKD)

30 July 2011
15:45

Report

Finland	52–75	Ukraine
Scoring by quarter: 18–20, 18–14, 10–19, 6–22
Pts: Cavén, Seppälä 11; Rebs: Huolila 7 Asts: Seppälä 3		Pts: Gerun 23; Rebs: Gerun 14; Asts: Artamonov 11

Wrocław University of P.E., Wrocław
Attendance: 50
Referees: Marek Cmikiewicz (POL), Luis Lopes (POR), Tomislav Hordov (CRO)

30 July 2011
18:00

Report

Greece	78–59	Czech Republic
Scoring by quarter: 28–11, 16–12, 19–21, 15–15
Pts: Larentzakis 22; Rebs: Larentzakis 10; Asts: Larentzakis, Zoumpos 4		Pts: Kríz 20; Rebs: Kríz 9 Asts: Lycka 5

Wrocław University of P.E., Wrocław
Attendance: 50
Referees: Jose Martin (ESP), Emin Mogulkoc (TUR), Sean David Myers (AUS)

31 July 2011
15:30

Report

Finland	55–68	Greece
Scoring by quarter: 7–18, 22–17, 19–16, 7–17
Pts: Seppälä 17; Rebs: Dolenc 6 Asts: Naapi 2		Pts: Larentzakis 23; Rebs: Melissaratos 10; Asts: Deligeorgis 4

Wrocław University of P.E., Wrocław
Attendance: 50
Referees: Ognjen Jokić (MNE), Marin Mehandjiev (BUL), Serghei Tislenco (MDA)

31 July 2011
17.45

Report

Ukraine	87–73	Czech Republic
Scoring by quarter: 23–21, 27–18, 23–16, 14–18
Pts: Artamonov 24; Rebs: Shundel, Gerun 10; Asts: Artamonov 5		Pts: Kyzlink 14; Rebs: Kyzlink 7 Asts: Festr 5

Wrocław University of P.E., Wrocław
Attendance: 50
Referees: Johann Jeanneau (FRA), Toni Rodriguez (GER), Henri Hilke (FIN)

== Knockout round ==
=== Championship ===
Quarter-finals
July 29
Spain	64
Croatia	50
July 29
Turkey	80
Lithuania	70
July 29
Poland	52
Italy	70
July 29
France	61
Serbia	71

Semi-finals
July 30
Spain	77
Turkey	54
July 30
Italy	61
Serbia	67

Final
July 31
Spain	71
Serbia	65
Third place
July 31
Italy	65
Turkey	69

=== 5th–8th playoffs ===
Semi-finals
July 30
Croatia	60
Lithuania	87
July 30
Poland	70
France	66

Fifth place
July 31
Lithuania	78
Poland	66
Seventh place
July 31
Croatia	61
France	80

=== 9th–12th playoffs ===
Semi-finals
July 29
Slovenia	69
Latvia	78
July 29
Russia	69
Germany	66

Ninth place
July 31
Latvia	58
Russia	64
Eleventh place
July 31
Slovenia	73
Germany	86

==== Classification 9–12 ====
29 July 2011
18:00

Report

Slovenia	69–78	Latvia
Scoring by quarter: 8–16, 13–19, 27–16, 21–27
Pts: Dimec 22; Rebs: Dimec 7 Asts: Tomic 7		Pts: Grazulis 13; Rebs: Grazulis, Bikse 6 Asts: Bikse 4

Wrocław University of P.E., Wrocław
Attendance: 100
Referees: Volodymyr Drabikovsky (UKR), Johann Jeanneau (FRA), Omer Esteron (ISR)

29 July 2011
20:15

Report

Russia	69–66	Germany
Scoring by quarter: 9–27, 20–12, 19–15, 21–12
Pts: Goldyrev 15; Rebs: Trushkin 11; Asts: Rodionov, Trushkin 4		Pts: Zipser 21; Rebs: Haukohl 8 Asts: Schröder 7

Wrocław University of P.E., Wrocław
Attendance: 100
Referees: Jose Martin (ESP), Tomislav Hordov (CRO), Henri Hilke (FIN)

==== Quarterfinals ====
29 July 2011
13:30

Report

Spain	64–50	Croatia
Scoring by quarter: 14–12, 11–13, 19–11, 20–14
Pts: Fernández 16; Rebs: Díez 15; Asts: Fernández 6		Pts: Ramljak 14; Rebs: Ramljak 6 Asts: Ramljak 3

Orbita Hall, Wrocław
Attendance: 100
Referees: Marco Giansanti (ITA), Luis Lopes (POR), Piotr Pastusiak (POL)

29 July 2011
15:45

Report

Turkey	80–70	Lithuania
Scoring by quarter: 24–14, 19–17, 13–30, 24–9
Pts: Geyik 20; Rebs: Geyik 8 Asts: Sipahi 6		Pts: Lekunas 15; Rebs: Kymantas 6 Asts: five players 2

Orbita Hall, Wrocław
Attendance: 300
Referees: Marek Cmikiewicz (POL), Ognjen Jokić (MNE), Tomislav Kovačić (SLO)

29 July 2011
18:00

Report

Poland	52–70	Italy
Scoring by quarter: 11–13, 9–23, 9–15, 23–19
Pts: Karnowski 14; Rebs: Karnowski 10; Asts: Grochowski 2		Pts: Imbrò 17; Rebs: Gaspardo 8 Asts: Imbrò 5

Orbita Hall, Wrocław
Attendance: 2500
Referees: Petros Papapetrou (GRE), Anton Makhlin (RUS), Sean David Myers (AUS)

29 July 2011
20:15

Report

France	61–71	Serbia
Scoring by quarter: 15–23, 19–17, 15–9, 12–22
Pts: Jaiteh 15; Rebs: Jaiteh 8 Asts: John 3		Pts: Bezbradica 19; Rebs: four players 5 Asts: Micić 6

Orbita Hall, Wrocław
Attendance: 300
Referees: Ivo Dolinek (CZE), Emin Mogulkoc (TUR), Toni Rodriguez (GER)

==== Classification 5–8 ====
30 July 2011
13:30

Report

Croatia	60–87	Lithuania
Scoring by quarter: 12–21, 20–20, 10–22, 18–24
Pts: Ramljak 16; Rebs: Ramljak 8 Asts: Čubrić, Ramljak 5		Pts: Gudaitis 27; Rebs: Gudaitis 8 Asts: Lekavicius 6

Orbita Hall, Wrocław
Attendance: 100
Referees: Petros Papapetrou (GRE), Ivo Dolinek (CZE), Toni Rodriguez (GER)

30 July 2011
15:45

Report

Poland	70–66	France
Scoring by quarter: 14–18, 22–13, 19–19, 15–16
Pts: Ponitka 21; Rebs: Ponitka 10; Asts: Michalak, Szymkiewicz 4		Pts: Jean-Charles 18; Rebs: Jean-Charles 7 Asts: Dallo 6

Orbita Hall, Wrocław
Attendance: 1,000
Referees: Marco Giansanti (ITA), Branislav Mrdak (SRB), Mindaugas Vecerskis (LTU)

==== Semifinals ====
30 July 2011
18:00

Report

Italy	61–67	Serbia
Scoring by quarter: 24–12, 9–12, 13–16, 15–27
Pts: Imbrò 19; Rebs: Tessitori 14; Asts: Magrini 4		Pts: Miljenović 20; Rebs: Dangubic 8 Asts: Miljenović 4

Orbita Hall, Wrocław
Attendance: 500
Referees: Anton Makhlin (RUS), Juris Kokainis (LAT), Tomislav Kovačić (SLO)

30 July 2011
20:15

Report

Spain	77–54	Turkey
Scoring by quarter: 19–5, 21–11, 15–13, 22–25
Pts: Díez 16; Rebs: Díez 13; Asts: Pérez 4		Pts: Tuncer 15; Rebs: Calban, Altunbey 5 Asts: Tuncer 4

Orbita Hall, Wrocław
Attendance: 500
Referees: Volodymyr Drabikovsky (UKR), Ognjen Jokić (MNE), Johann Jeanneau (FRA)

==== 11th place game ====
31 July 2011
11:00

Report

Slovenia	73–86	Germany
Scoring by quarter: 12–20, 18–21, 23–26, 20–19
Pts: Rupnik 20; Rebs: three players 3 Asts: Rupnik 20		Pts: Schröder 22; Rebs: Radosavljević 8 Asts: Schröder 8

Wrocław University of P.E., Wrocław
Attendance: 50
Referees: Anton Makhlin (RUS), Luis Lopes (POR), Omer Esteron (ISR)

==== 9th place game ====
31 July 2011
13:15

Report

Latvia	58–64	Russia
Scoring by quarter: 6–16, 16–10, 21–14, 15–24'
Pts: Sipolins 10; Rebs: Krumins, Grazulis 8 Asts: Reinfelds 2		Pts: Trushkin 15; Rebs: Trushkin 16; Asts: Rodionov, Karpenko 4

Wrocław University of P.E., Wrocław
Attendance: 50
Referees: Ivo Dolinek (CZE), Igor Mitrovski (MKD), Sean David Myers (AUS)

==== 7th place game ====
31 July 2011
11:15

Report

France	80–61	Croatia
Scoring by quarter: 18–14, 19–30, 16–10, 27–7
Pts: Jaiteh 18; Rebs: Jaiteh 17; Asts: Invernizzi 5		Pts: Buovac, Brzoja 12; Rebs: Krstanović 12; Asts: Ramljak 5

Orbita Hall, Wrocław
Attendance: 200
Referees: Volodymyr Drabikovsky (UKR), Piotr Pastusiak (POL), Tomislav Kovačić (SLO)

==== 5th place game ====
31 July 2011
13:30

Report

Poland	66–78	Lithuania
Scoring by quarter: 20–18, 15–20, 16–25, 15–15
Pts: Michalak 12; Rebs: Ponitka 8 Asts: Koelner, Grochowski 3		Pts: Kymantas 18; Rebs: Olisevicius 9 Asts: three players 4

Orbita Hall, Wrocław
Attendance: 2,000
Referees: Juris Kokainis (LAT), Emin Mogulkoc (TUR), Tomislav Hordov (CRO)

==== Bronze medal game ====
31 July 2011
15:45

Report

Italy	65–69	Turkey
Scoring by quarter: 21–19, 20–13, 9–19, 15–18
Pts: Veccia 14; Rebs: Tessitori 9 Asts: Magrini 5		Pts: Erülkü 12; Rebs: Eroğlu 7 Asts: Eroğlu 6

Orbita Hall, Wrocław
Attendance: 2,500
Referees: Jose Martin (ESP), Branislav Mrdak (SRB), Mindaugas Vecerskis (LTU)

==== Final ====
31 July 2011
18:00

Report

Serbia	65–71	Spain
Scoring by quarter: 14–16, 22–27, 15–11, 14–17
Pts: Mitrović, Micić 13; Rebs: Janković 8 Asts: Milijenović, Micić 4		Pts: Sanz 22; Rebs: Díez 8 Asts: Fernández, Olaizola 2

Orbita Hall, Wrocław
Attendance: 3,000
Referees: Marco Giansanti (ITA), Marek Cmikiewicz (POL), Petros Papapetrou (GRE)

== Final standings ==
Rank	Team	Record
1st place, gold medalist(s)	Spain	9–0
2nd place, silver medalist(s)	Serbia	6–3
3rd place, bronze medalist(s)	Turkey	6–3
4th	Italy	4–5
5th	Lithuania	6–3
6th	Poland	6–3
7th	France	6–3
8th	Croatia	4–5
9th	Russia	4–4
10th	Latvia	2–6
11th	Germany	3–5
12th	Slovenia	2–6
13th	Ukraine	5–4
14th	Greece	4–5
15th	Czech Republic	2–7
16th	Finland	1–8

== Awards ==
2011 Under-18 European Championship winner

Spain
Third title

Most Valuable Player
(Spain) Álex Abrines
