= 2010 FIBA Europe Under-16 Championship =

2010 EuroBasket Under-16
24th FIBA Europe Under-16 Championship

Tournament details
- Host country: Montenegro
- Dates: 5–15 August 2010
- Teams: 16
- Venue(s): 2 (in 1 host city)

Final positions
- Champions: Croatia (2nd title)

Tournament statistics
- MVP: (Croatia) Dario Šarić
- Top scorer: (Croatia) Šarić (24.3)
- Top rebounds: (Croatia) Šarić (11.5)
- Top assists: (Bulgaria) Karamfilov (5.9)
- PPG (Team): Croatia (71.4)
- RPG (Team): Turkey (43.1)
- APG (Team): Poland (14.0)

Official website
- Official web

The 2010 FIBA Europe Under-16 Championship was the 24th edition of the FIBA Europe Under-16 Championship. 16 teams featured the competition, held in Montenegro from August 5–15. Spain was the defending champion. This year's edition was won by Croatia

== Teams ==
- Bulgaria
- Croatia
- Denmark
- France
- Germany
- Greece
- Israel
- Italy
- Latvia
- Lithuania
- Montenegro
- Poland
- Russia
- Serbia
- Spain
- Turkey

== Group stages ==
=== Preliminary round ===
In this round, the sixteen teams were allocated in four groups of four teams each. The top three qualified for the qualifying round. The last team of each group played for the 13th–16th place in the Classification Games.

| Team advanced to Qualifying Round |
| Team competed in Classification Round |

Times given below are in CEST (UTC+2).

==== Group A ====
| Team | Pld | W | L | PF | PA | PD | Pts | Tiebreaker |
|---|---|---|---|---|---|---|---|---|
| Croatia | 3 | 2 | 1 | 185 | 194 | −9 | 5 | 1–0 |
| Serbia | 3 | 2 | 1 | 215 | 179 | +36 | 5 | 0–1 |
| Italy | 3 | 1 | 2 | 195 | 199 | −4 | 4 | 1–0 |
| Germany | 3 | 1 | 2 | 172 | 195 | −23 | 4 | 0–1 |

August 5
14:15

Report

| Germany | 54–73 | Italy |
Scoring by quarter: 21–16, 9–25, 16–13, 8–19
| Pts: Mauricio Marin (16); Rebs: Dominic Lockhart (7); Asts: David Taylor (3) | | Pts: Francesco Candussi (18); Rebs: Aristide Landi (8); Asts: Matteo Imbrò (4) |

Sportska Dvorana Topolica, Bar
Attendance: 200
Referees: Anton Makhlin, Marin Mehandjiev, Yaari Rainisch

August 5
18:45

Report

| Croatia | 69–64 | Serbia |
Scoring by quarter: 14–6, 17–23, 27–20, 11–15
| Pts: Dario Šarić (25); Rebs: Dario Šarić (14); Asts: Dario Šarić (6) | | Pts: Nikola Janković, Nikola Majic (16); Rebs: Nikola Majic (13); Asts: Vasilije Micić (3) |

Sportska Dvorana Topolica, Bar
Referees: Johann Jeanneau, Jurgis Laurinavicius, Ingus Baumanis

August 6
14:15

Report

| Italy | 61–72 | Croatia |
Scoring by quarter: 22–17, 12–16, 16–22, 11–17
| Pts: Aristide Landi (15); Rebs: Aristide Landi (8); Asts: Matteo Imbrò (6) | | Pts: Mislav Brzoja (17); Rebs: Filip Bundovic (9); Asts: Martin Junakovic, Dario Šarić (6) |

Osnovna Skola Jugoslavija, Bar
Attendance: 100
Referees: Zoran Sutulovic, Ingus Baumanis, Anton Makhlin

August 6
18:45

Report

| Serbia | 78–49 | Germany |
Scoring by quarter: 17–15, 20–11, 17–10, 24–13
| Pts: Nikola Radičević (21); Rebs: four players (5); Asts: Vasilije Micić (4) | | Pts: Paul Zipser (14); Rebs: Dominic Lockhart (9); Asts: Paul Zipser, Dominic Lockhart (2) |

Osnovna Skola Jugoslavija, Bar
Attendance: 600
Referees: Miguel Perez Perez, Marin Mehandjiev, Haris Bijedic

August 7
14:15

Report

| Germany | 69–44 | Croatia |
Scoring by quarter: 17–15, 20–11, 17–10, 24–13
| Pts: Mauricio Marin (14); Rebs: Paul Zipser (6); Asts: Jamo Ruppert (4) | | Pts: Nikola Urli (16); Rebs: Daniel Zovko (6); Asts: Dominik Mavra, Nikola Urli (2) |

Sportska Dvorana Topolica, Bar
Attendance: 100
Referees: Miguel Perez Perez, Florin Grigoras, Gentian Cici

August 7
18:45

Report

| Serbia | 73–61 | Italy |
Scoring by quarter: 25–14, 16–12, 9–26, 23–8
| Pts: Nikola Janković (14); Rebs: Nikola Janković (10); Asts: Nikola Radičević (4) | | Pts: Matteo Imbrò (18); Rebs: Amedeo Tessitori (10); Asts: Matteo Imbrò (4) |

Sportska Dvorana Topolica, Bar
Attendance: 1000
Referees: Johann Jeanneau, Ismail Özgün, Ingus Baumanis

==== Group B ====
| Team | Pld | W | L | PF | PA | PD | Pts | Tiebreaker |
|---|---|---|---|---|---|---|---|---|
| France | 3 | 3 | 0 | 194 | 133 | +61 | 6 | |
| Lithuania | 3 | 1 | 2 | 201 | 179 | +22 | 4 | 1–1 +42 |
| Greece | 3 | 1 | 2 | 171 | 173 | −2 | 4 | 1–1 +1 |
| Denmark | 3 | 1 | 2 | 137 | 218 | −81 | 4 | 1–1 −43 |

August 5
18:45

Report

| Denmark | 55–53 | Greece |
Scoring by quarter: 9–11, 16–17, 19–11, 11–14
| Pts: Peter Moeller (15); Rebs: Rasmus Larsen (9); Asts: Anders Hansen (3) | | Pts: Kyprianos Maragkos (19); Rebs: Diamantis Slaftsakis (13); Asts: Ioannis Papapetrou (3) |

Osnovna Skola Jugoslavija, Bar
Attendance: 50
Referees: Boris Schmidt, Gentian Cici, Matthew John Beattie

August 5
21:00

Report

| France | 66–46 | Lithuania |
Scoring by quarter: 22–14, 15–12, 11–12, 18–8
| Pts: Charly Maraux (19); Rebs: Alexandre Chassang (9); Asts: Charly Maraux (4) | | Pts: Augustinas Jankaitis (15); Rebs: Augustinas Jankaitis (6); Asts: three players (2) |

Osnovna Skola Jugoslavija, Bar
Referees: Zoran Sutulovic, Igor Mitrovski, Marcin Kowalski

August 6
18:45

Report

| Lithuania | 92–47 | Denmark |
Scoring by quarter: 32–5, 21–11, 24–9, 15–22
| Pts: Tomas Dimša (22); Rebs: Augustinas Jankaitis (9); Asts: Augustinas Jankaitis (3) | | Pts: Rasmus Larsen (17); Rebs: Rasmus Larsen (9); Asts: Peter Moeller (3) |

Sportska Dvorana Topolica, Bar
Attendance: 70
Referees: Petar Obradovic, Ismail Özgün, Matthew John Beattie

August 6
21:00

Report

| Greece | 52–55 | France |
Scoring by quarter: 15–9, 11–8, 18–20, 8–18
| Pts: Ioannis Papapetrou (14); Rebs: Alexandros Mitsialos (7); Asts: Ioannis Papapetrou (4) | | Pts: Anthony Racine (23); Rebs: Charly Maraux, Mouhammadou Jaiteh (6); Asts: Charly Maraux (3) |

Sportska Dvorana Topolica, Bar
Attendance: 150
Referees: Sreten Radovic, Aleksandar Glisic, Marcin Kowalski

August 7
18:45

Report

| Denmark | 35–73 | France |
Scoring by quarter: 14–22, 14–18, 6–16, 1–17
| Pts: Rasmus Larsen (14); Rebs: Rasmus Larsen, Anders Hansen (4); Asts: Adam Holm-Weber, David Knudsen (2) | | Pts: Anthony Racine (18); Rebs: Boris Dallo (16); Asts: Benjamin Sene (6) |

Osnovna Skola Jugoslavija, Bar
Referees: Yaari Rainisch, Petar Obradovic, Marcin Kowalski

August 7
21:00

Report

| Lithuania | 63–66 | Greece |
Scoring by quarter: 17–14, 15–15, 13–16, 18–21
| Pts: Marius Grigonis (26); Rebs: Augustinas Jankaitis (9); Asts: three players (2) | | Pts: Ioannis Papapetrou (18); Rebs: Kyprianos Maragkos (7); Asts: Thomas Amparas, Dimitrios Karampekis (3) |

Osnovna Skola Jugoslavija, Bar
Referees: Zoran Sutulovic, Marin Mehandjiev, Sérgio Silva

==== Group C ====
| Team | Pld | W | L | PF | PA | PD | Pts | Tiebreaker |
|---|---|---|---|---|---|---|---|---|
| Spain | 3 | 3 | 0 | 220 | 124 | +96 | 6 | |
| Bulgaria | 3 | 2 | 1 | 188 | 198 | −10 | 5 | |
| Poland | 3 | 1 | 2 | 177 | 200 | −23 | 4 | |
| Latvia | 3 | 0 | 3 | 143 | 206 | −63 | 3 | |

August 5
14:15

Report

| Bulgaria | 79–53 | Poland |
Scoring by quarter: 5–12, 24–15, 24–11, 26–15
| Pts: Deyan Karamfilov (19); Rebs: Nikolay Stoyanov (18); Asts: Deyan Karamfilov (8) | | Pts: Daniel Szymkiewicz (17); Rebs: Daniel Szymkiewicz (9); Asts: Jan Grzelinski (4) |

Osnovna Skola Jugoslavija, Bar
Attendance: 30
Referees: Ismail Özgün, Aleksandar Glisic, Jonas Bille

August 5
16:30

Report

| Latvia | 32–65 | Spain |
Scoring by quarter: 4–16, 14–23, 7–17, 7–9
| Pts: Oskars Reinfelds (9); Rebs: Oskars Reinfelds, Rihards Adins (5); Asts: Oskars Reinfelds (2) | | Pts: Albert Homs, Josep Perez (11); Rebs: Willy Hernangómez (6); Asts: Alberto Díaz (3) |

Osnovna Skola Jugoslavija, Bar
Referees: Sreten Radovic, Radomir Vojinovic, Haris Bijedic

August 6
14:15

Report

| Poland | 72–45 | Latvia |
Scoring by quarter: 26–10, 12–15, 20–13, 14–7
| Pts: Daniel Szymkiewicz (28); Rebs: Daniel Szymkiewicz, Filip Struski (12); Asts: Daniel Szymkiewicz (4) | | Pts: Ceslavs Mateikovics (18); Rebs: Oskars Reinfelds (10); Asts: Oskars Reinfelds, Toms Elvis Leimanis (2) |

Sportska Dvorana Topolica, Bar
Attendance: 50
Referees: Johann Jeanneau, Radomir Vojinovic, Jonas Bille

August 6
16:30

Report

| Spain | 79–40 | Bulgaria |
Scoring by quarter: 14–9, 20–13, 31–12, 14–6
| Pts: Albert Homs (19); Rebs: Sebas Saiz (8); Asts: Josep Perez (4) | | Pts: Sasha Vezenkov (11); Rebs: Nikolay Stoyanov (12); Asts: Vassil Mihaylov (4) |

Sportska Dvorana Topolica, Bar
Attendance: 150
Referees: Yaari Rainisch, Jurgis Laurinavicius, Nikolaos Somos

August 7
14:15

Report

| Bulgaria | 69–66 | Latvia |
Scoring by quarter: 17–12, 14–13, 20–19, 18–22
| Pts: Deyan Karamfilov (20); Rebs: Nikolay Stoyanov (8); Asts: Deyan Karamfilov (5) | | Pts: Roberts Krastins, Toms Elvis Leimanis (16); Rebs: Oskars Reinfelds (8); Asts: Oskars Reinfelds (4) |

Osnovna Skola Jugoslavija, Bar
Attendance: 30
Referees: Paolo Taurino, Radomir Vojinovic, Igor Mitrovski

August 7
16:30

Report

| Spain | 76–52 | Poland |
Scoring by quarter: 21–17, 15–16, 23–19, 17–9
| Pts: Albert Homs (18); Rebs: Albert Homs (10); Asts: Josep Perez (5) | | Pts: Jan Grzelinski (12); Rebs: Rafal Stefanik (7); Asts: Daniel Szymkiewicz (4) |

Osnovna Skola Jugoslavija, Bar
Attendance: 70
Referees: Anton Makhlin, Nikolaos Somos, Matthew John Beattie

==== Group D ====
| Team | Pld | W | L | PF | PA | PD | Pts | Tiebreaker |
|---|---|---|---|---|---|---|---|---|
| Montenegro | 3 | 3 | 0 | 213 | 185 | +28 | 6 | |
| Turkey | 3 | 1 | 2 | 183 | 178 | +5 | 4 | 1–1 +18 |
| Russia | 3 | 1 | 2 | 186 | 194 | −8 | 4 | 1–1 −3 |
| Israel | 3 | 1 | 2 | 190 | 215 | −25 | 4 | 1–1 −15 |

August 5
16:30

Report

| Russia | 50–71 | Turkey |
Scoring by quarter: 17–13, 14–24, 7–17, 12–17
| Pts: Mikhail Kulagin (14); Rebs: Mikhail Kulagin, Rostislav Karenin (6); Asts: Georgy Egorov (4) | | Pts: Tayfun Erülkü (21); Rebs: Burak Haciismail (9); Asts: Zafer Alp (2) |

Sportska Dvorana Topolica, Bar
Attendance: 200
Referees: Paolo Taurino, Petar Obradovic, Florin Grigoras

August 5
21:00

Report

| Montenegro | 81–71 | Israel |
Scoring by quarter: 19–13, 23–9, 19–22, 20–27
| Pts: Nikola Ivanović (25); Rebs: Milos Pajovic (11); Asts: Nikola Ivanović (6) | | Pts: Egor Koulechov (19); Rebs: Egor Koulechov (6); Asts: Naor Sharon (5) |

Sportska Dvorana Topolica, Bar
Attendance: 1,800
Referees: Miguel Perez Perez, Nikolaos Somos, Sérgio Silva

August 6
16:30

Report

| Israel | 58–76 | Russia |
Scoring by quarter: 7–22, 15–17, 16–14, 20–23
| Pts: Naor Sharon (18); Rebs: Noam Levy (5); Asts: four players (1) | | Pts: Stanislav Ilnitskiy (25); Rebs: Stanislav Ilnitskiy (12); Asts: Viktor Kashin, Serdar Annaev (4) |

Osnovna Skola Jugoslavija, Bar
Referees: Boris Schmidt, Igor Mitrovski, Sérgio Silva

August 6
21:00

Report

| Turkey | 54–67 | Montenegro |
Scoring by quarter: 8–17, 19–17, 11–15, 16–18
| Pts: Tayfun Erülkü, Burak Haciismail (10); Rebs: Talat Altunbey (6); Asts: Tayfun Erülkü (5) | | Pts: Nikola Žižić (14); Rebs: Milos Pajovic, Milija Miković (7); Asts: Dusan Perovic (4) |

Osnovna Skola Jugoslavija, Bar
Attendance: 900
Referees: Paolo Taurino, Florin Grigoras, Gentian Cici

August 7
16:30

Report

| Turkey | 58–61 | Israel |
Scoring by quarter: 6–5, 16–13, 20–16, 16–27
| Pts: Tayfun Erülkü (24); Rebs: three players (5); Asts: Tayfun Erülkü, Metin Türen (4) | | Pts: Egor Koulechov, Naor Sharon (13); Rebs: Noam Levy, Egor Koulechov (7); Asts: Naor Sharon (7) |

Sportska Dvorana Topolica, Bar
Attendance: 150
Referees: Sreten Radovic, Aleksandar Glisic, Jonas Bille

August 7
21:00

Report

| Montenegro | 65–60 | Russia |
Scoring by quarter: 14–16, 19–25, 13–10, 19–9
| Pts: Nikola Ivanović (29); Rebs: Milos Pajovic (15); Asts: Nikola Ivanović (3) | | Pts: Pavel Sizov (17); Rebs: Pavel Sizov (7); Asts: Pavel Sizov (3) |

Sportska Dvorana Topolica, Bar
Attendance: 2,700
Referees: Boris Schmidt, Jurgis Laurinavicius, Haris Bijedic

=== Qualifying round ===
The twelve teams remaining were allocated in two groups of six teams each. The four top teams advanced to the quarterfinals. The last two teams of each group played for the 9th–12th place.

| Team advanced to Quarterfinals |
| Team competed in 9th–12th playoffs |

==== Group E ====
| Team | Pld | W | L | PF | PA | PD | Pts | Tiebreaker |
|---|---|---|---|---|---|---|---|---|
| Croatia | 5 | 4 | 1 | 352 | 306 | +46 | 9 | 1–1 +4 |
| Serbia | 5 | 4 | 1 | 364 | 334 | +30 | 9 | 1–1 +3 |
| France | 5 | 4 | 1 | 313 | 295 | +18 | 9 | 1–1 −7 |
| Lithuania | 5 | 1 | 4 | 331 | 347 | −16 | 6 | 1–1 +16 |
| Italy | 5 | 1 | 4 | 319 | 351 | −32 | 6 | 1–1 −7 |
| Greece | 5 | 1 | 4 | 295 | 341 | −46 | 6 | 1–1 −9 |

August 9
16:30

Report

| Italy | 65–67 | France |
Scoring by quarter: 21–26, 16–9, 9–13, 19–19
| Pts: Francesco Candussi (20); Rebs: Aristide Landi (10); Asts: Matteo Imbrò (6) | | Pts: Boris Dallo (16); Rebs: Mouhammadou Jaiteh (12); Asts: Benjamin Sene (4) |

Sportska Dvorana Topolica, Bar
Attendance: 100
Referees: Zoran Sutulovic, Igor Mitrovski, Radomir Vojinovic

August 9
18:45

Report

| Greece | 49–70 | Croatia |
Scoring by quarter: 13–16, 13–15, 14–13, 9–26
| Pts: Kyprianos Maragkos (10); Rebs: Alexandros Mitsialos (8); Asts: Dimitrios Karampekis (3) | | Pts: Dario Šarić (31); Rebs: Dario Šarić (15); Asts: Martin Junakovic (5) |

Sportska Dvorana Topolica, Bar
Attendance: 60
Referees: Marcin Kowalski, Florin Grigoras, Gentian Cici

August 9
21:00

Report

| Lithuania | 74–76 | Serbia |
Scoring by quarter: 26–15, 16–18, 12–18, 20–25
| Pts: Tomas Dimša (21); Rebs: Denis Krestinin (9); Asts: Lukas Lekavičius (3) | | Pts: Vasilije Micić (19); Rebs: Nikola Janković (9); Asts: Vasilije Micić (5) |

Sportska Dvorana Topolica, Bar
Attendance: 400
Referees: Miguel Perez Perez, Sérgio Silva, Ismail Özgün

August 10
16:30

Report

| Greece | 59–71 | Italy |
Scoring by quarter: 19–23, 12–14, 19–13, 9–21
| Pts: Ioannis Papapetrou (17); Rebs: Kyprianos Maragkos (10); Asts: Ioannis Papapetrou, Ioannis Karamalegkos (2) | | Pts: Aristide Landi (28); Rebs: Matteo Imbrò (10); Asts: Matteo Imbrò (9) |

Osnovna Skola Jugoslavija, Bar
Attendance: 200
Referees: Zoran Sutulovic, Ismail Özgün, Jonas Bille

August 10
18:45

Report

| Serbia | 69–61 (OT) | France |
Scoring by quarter: 15–10, 13–15, 10–14, 17–16, Overtime: 14–6
| Pts: Nikola Radičević (16); Rebs: Nikola Janković (13); Asts: Vasilije Micić (6) | | Pts: Mouhammadou Jaiteh (16); Rebs: Mouhammadou Jaiteh (12); Asts: three players (2) |

Osnovna Skola Jugoslavija, Bar
Attendance: 1,500
Referees: Paolo Taurino, Ingus Baumanis, Sérgio Silva

August 10
21:00

Report

| Croatia | 78–68 | Lithuania |
Scoring by quarter: 24–21, 12–16, 15–14, 27–17
| Pts: three players (15); Rebs: Dario Šarić (17); Asts: Dario Šarić (6) | | Pts: Augustinas Jankaitis, Justas Tamulis (15); Rebs: Augustinas Jankaitis (8); Asts: Lukas Lekavičius (6) |

Osnovna Skola Jugoslavija, Bar
Attendance: 200
Referees: Miguel Perez Perez, Igor Mitrovski, Anton Makhlin

August 11
16:30

Report

| Serbia | 82–69 | Greece |
Scoring by quarter: 27–29, 19–15, 14–14, 22–11
| Pts: Nikola Janković, Stefan Pot (15); Rebs: Nikola Majic (11); Asts: Nikola Majic (11) | | Pts: Kyprianos Maragkos (26); Rebs: Kyprianos Maragkos, Alexandros Mitsialos (8); Asts: Thomas Amparas (4) |

Sportska Dvorana Topolica, Bar
Attendance: 500
Referees: Johann Jeanneau, Yaari Rainisch, Matthew John Beattie

August 11
18:45

Report

| Lithuania | 80–61 | Italy |
Scoring by quarter: 26–19, 16–9, 12–17, 26–16
| Pts: Marius Grigonis (16); Rebs: Augustinas Jankaitis (10); Asts: Simas Raupys, Justas Tamulis (2) | | Pts: Mirco Turel (13); Rebs: Francesco Candussi (6); Asts: Matteo Imbrò (4) |

Sportska Dvorana Topolica, Bar
Attendance: 50
Referees: Petar Obradovic, Florin Grigoras, Gentian Cici

August 11
21:00

Report

| France | 64–63 | Croatia |
Scoring by quarter: 22–18, 14–15, 15–17, 13–13
| Pts: Charly Maraux, Anthony Racine (14); Rebs: Charly Maraux (8); Asts: Charly Maraux (7) | | Pts: Dario Šarić (19); Rebs: Dario Šarić, Karlo Lebo (9); Asts: Dario Šarić (6) |

Sportska Dvorana Topolica, Bar
Attendance: 50
Referees: Marcin Kowalski, Igor Mitrovski, Ismail Özgün

==== Group F ====
| Team | Pld | W | L | PF | PA | PD | Pts | Tiebreaker |
|---|---|---|---|---|---|---|---|---|
| Montenegro | 5 | 4 | 1 | 356 | 318 | +38 | 9 | 1–0 |
| Spain | 5 | 4 | 1 | 369 | 294 | +75 | 9 | 0–1 |
| Turkey | 5 | 3 | 2 | 360 | 311 | +49 | 8 | |
| Russia | 5 | 2 | 3 | 328 | 349 | −21 | 7 | 1–0 |
| Bulgaria | 5 | 2 | 3 | 300 | 334 | −34 | 7 | 0–1 |
| Poland | 5 | 0 | 5 | 321 | 428 | −107 | 5 | |

August 9
16:30

Report

| Turkey | 77–60 | Bulgaria |
Scoring by quarter: 22–16, 17–13, 19–13, 19–18
| Pts: Burak Haciismail (20); Rebs: Metecan Birsen (8); Asts: Kenan Sipahi (6) | | Pts: Nikolay Stoyanov (17); Rebs: Nikolay Stoyanov (8); Asts: Deyan Karamfilov (10) |

Osnovna Skola Jugoslavija, Bar
Attendance: 50
Referees: Sreten Radovic, Jurgis Laurinavicius, Matthew John Beattie

August 9
18:45

Report

| Russia | 65–77 | Spain |
Scoring by quarter: 17–21, 8–18, 14–22, 26–16
| Pts: Vasily Martynov (10); Rebs: three players (4); Asts: Mikhail Kulagin (2) | | Pts: Josep Perez (18); Rebs: Willy Hernangómez (7); Asts: three players (2) |

Osnovna Skola Jugoslavija, Bar
Attendance: 300
Referees: Paolo Taurino, Nikolaos Somos, Jonas Bille

August 9
21:00

Report

| Poland | 69–95 | Montenegro |
Scoring by quarter: 23–24, 20–33, 14–19, 12–19
| Pts: Daniel Szymkiewicz, Kacper Borowski (13); Rebs: Daniel Szymkiewicz (5); Asts: Daniel Szymkiewicz (6) | | Pts: Nikola Ivanović (29); Rebs: Dusan Perovic (10); Asts: Nikola Ivanović (9) |

Osnovna Skola Jugoslavija, Bar
Attendance: 2,300
Referees: Johann Jeanneau, Yaari Rainisch, Ingus Baumanis

August 10
16:30

Report

| Spain | 74–69 | Turkey |
Scoring by quarter: 23–23, 21–17, 16–13, 14–16
| Pts: Javier Marin (22); Rebs: Willy Hernangómez (23); Asts: Darío Brizuela (3) | | Pts: Kenan Sipahi, Ismail Gülmez (13); Rebs: Burak Haciismail (9); Asts: Kenan Sipahi, Metecan Birsen (2) |

Sportska Dvorana Topolica, Bar
Attendance: 100
Referees: Boris Schmidt, Jurgis Laurinavicius, Matthew John Beattie

August 10
18:45

Report

| Russia | 89–87 | Poland |
Scoring by quarter: 19–32, 30–12, 27–21, 13–22
| Pts: Dmitry Guzikov (19); Rebs: Dmitry Guzikov, Stanislav Ilnitskiy (10); Asts: Mikhail Kulagin (7) | | Pts: Daniel Szymkiewicz, Jakub Garbacz (26); Rebs: Damian Jeszke, Filip Struski (8); Asts: Jan Grzelinski (7) |

Sportska Dvorana Topolica, Bar
Referees: Sreten Radovic, Nikolaos Somos, Yaari Rainisch

August 10
21:00

Report

| Bulgaria | 72–61 | Montenegro |
Scoring by quarter: 19–15, 14–14, 19–13, 20–19
| Pts: Denislav Vutev (20); Rebs: Denislav Vutev (14); Asts: Deyan Karamfilov (9) | | Pts: Dusan Perovic (15); Rebs: Milija Miković (8); Asts: Nikola Ivanović (5) |

Sportska Dvorana Topolica, Bar
Referees: Petar Obradovic, Marcin Kowalski, Florin Grigoras

August 11
16:30

Report

| Bulgaria | 49–64 | Russia |
Scoring by quarter: 10–12, 14–8, 17–27, 8–17
| Pts: Denislav Vutev (12); Rebs: Deyan Karamfilov (7); Asts: Deyan Karamfilov, Nikolay Stoyanov (2) | | Pts: Stanislav Ilnitskiy (18); Rebs: Stanislav Ilnitskiy (14); Asts: Mikhail Kulagin, Viktor Kashin (4) |

Osnovna Skola Jugoslavija, Bar
Attendance: 150
Referees: Miguel Perez Perez, Radomir Vojinovic, Sérgio Silva

August 11
18:45

Report

| Turkey | 89–60 | Poland |
Scoring by quarter: 28–11, 17–12, 16–19, 28–18
| Pts: Burak Haciismail (22); Rebs: Burak Haciismail, Talat Altunbey (9); Asts: Kenan Sipahi (7) | | Pts: Jan Grzelinski (16); Rebs: Jan Grzelinski (7); Asts: Jan Grzelinski (6) |

Osnovna Skola Jugoslavija, Bar
Referees: Aleksandar Glisic, Jurgis Laurinavicius, Jonas Bille

August 11
21:00

Report

| Montenegro | 68–63 | Spain |
Scoring by quarter: 21–14, 9–21, 14–8, 24–20
| Pts: Nikola Ivanović (30); Rebs: Nikola Ivanović (9); Asts: Nikola Ivanović (4) | | Pts: Willy Hernangómez (16); Rebs: Willy Hernangómez (9); Asts: Alberto Díaz (5) |

Osnovna Skola Jugoslavija, Bar
Attendance: 3,000
Referees: Paolo Taurino, Boris Schmidt, Nikolaos Somos

=== Classification round ===
The last teams of each group in the preliminary round will compete in this Classification Round. The four teams will play in one group. The last two teams will be relegated to Division B for the next season.

| Team will be relegated to Division B. |

==== Group G ====
| Team | Pld | W | L | PF | PA | PD | Pts | Tiebreaker |
|---|---|---|---|---|---|---|---|---|
| Germany | 6 | 4 | 2 | 370 | 336 | +34 | 10 | |
| Latvia | 6 | 4 | 2 | 342 | 332 | +10 | 10 | |
| Israel | 6 | 3 | 3 | 377 | 362 | +15 | 9 | |
| Denmark | 6 | 1 | 5 | 333 | 392 | −59 | 7 | |

August 9
14:15

Report

| Denmark | 46–65 | Latvia |
Scoring by quarter: 8–22, 15–18, 12–16, 11–9
| Pts: Anders Hansen (11); Rebs: Rasmus Larsen (9); Asts: David Knudsen (2) | | Pts: Edgars Stelmahers (22); Rebs: Rihards Adins (9); Asts: Toms Elvis Leimanis (3) |

Osnovna Skola Jugoslavija, Bar
Referees: Boris Schmidt, Aleksandar Glisic, Anton Makhlin

August 9
14:15

Report

| Germany | 62–59 | Israel |
Scoring by quarter: 14–16, 19–13, 16–11, 13–19
| Pts: Phillip Daubner (12); Rebs: Dominic Lockhart (8); Asts: Max Merz, David Taylor (3) | | Pts: Maxim Kikus (16); Rebs: Egor Koulechov (10); Asts: Naor Sharon (4) |

Sportska Dvorana Topolica, Bar
Referees: Petar Obradovic, Marin Mehandjiev, Haris Bijedic

August 10
14:15

Report

| Latvia | 54–56 | Germany |
Scoring by quarter: 16–19, 14–11, 7–14, 17–12
| Pts: Oskars Reinfelds (22); Rebs: Oskars Reinfelds, Edgars Stelmahers (8); Asts: Edgars Stelmahers (2) | | Pts: Paul Zipser (18); Rebs: Dominic Lockhart (10); Asts: Jamo Ruppert (2) |

Sportska Dvorana Topolica, Bar
Attendance: 30
Referees: Marin Mehandjiev, Aleksandar Glisic, Haris Bijedic

August 10
14:15

Report

| Israel | 63–61 | Denmark |
Scoring by quarter: 8–14, 30–14, 9–21, 16–12
| Pts: Egor Koulechov (22); Rebs: Egor Koulechov (8); Asts: four players (4) | | Pts: Rasmus Larsen (21); Rebs: Rasmus Larsen (14); Asts: David Knudsen (6) |

Osnovna Skola Jugoslavija, Bar

August 11
14:15

Report

| Germany | 68–40 | Denmark |
Scoring by quarter: 24–7, 17–13, 13–11, 14–9
| Pts: Paul Zipser (14); Rebs: Dominic Lockhart (9); Asts: Dominic Lockhart (3) | | Pts: David Knudsen (10); Rebs: Peter Moeller, Jacob Jensen (5); Asts: Peter Moeller (3) |

Osnovna Skola Jugoslavija, Bar
Attendance: 50
Referees: Zoran Sutulovic, Ingus Baumanis, Anton Makhlin

August 11
14:15

Report

| Latvia | 63–58 | Israel |
Scoring by quarter: 14–18, 15–10, 13–14, 21–16
| Pts: Oskars Reinfelds, Ceslavs Mateikovics (15); Rebs: Oskars Reinfelds (11); Asts: Oskars Reinfeld, Ceslavs Mateikovics (2) | | Pts: Maxim Kikus (16); Rebs: Egor Koulechov (8); Asts: Egor Koulechov, Naor Sharon (2) |

Sportska Dvorana Topolica, Bar
Referees: Sreten Radovic, Marin Mehandjiev, Haris Bijedic

August 13
14:15

Report

| Israel | 60–49 | Germany |
Scoring by quarter: 11–12, 17–13, 12–13, 20–11
| Pts: Rafi Menco (14); Rebs: Egor Koulechov (10); Asts: Adar Ben Aliza, Ishai Kislev (2) | | Pts: Dominic Lockhart (11); Rebs: Dominic Lockhart (13); Asts: five players (1) |

Osnovna Skola Jugoslavija, Bar
Attendance: 20
Referees: Zoran Sutulovic, Radomir Vojinovic, Aleksandar Glisic

August 13
16:30

Report

| Latvia | 49–47 | Denmark |
Scoring by quarter: 23–11, 10–9, 6–9, 10–18
| Pts: Edgars Stelmahers (17); Rebs: Ceslavs Mateikovics (8); Asts: Oskars Reinfelds (4) | | Pts: Rasmus Larsen (16); Rebs: Rasmus Larsen (10); Asts: David Knudsen, Alexander Andersen (3) |

Osnovna Skola Jugoslavija, Bar
Attendance: 30

August 14
14:15

Report

| Denmark | 62–75 | Israel |
Scoring by quarter: 7–17, 18–17, 16–19, 21–22
| Pts: Rasmus Larsen, Peter Moeller (21); Rebs: Rasmus Larsen (11); Asts: Adam Holm-Weber (3) | | Pts: Egor Koulechov (17); Rebs: Egor Koulechov (9); Asts: Naor Sharon (5) |

Osnovna Skola Jugoslavija, Bar
Attendance: 40
Referees: Paolo Taurino, Marin Mehandjiev, Gentian Cici

August 14
16:30

Report

| Germany | 63–46 | Latvia |
Scoring by quarter: 19–14, 15–14, 13–2, 16–16
| Pts: Mauricio Marin (18); Rebs: Dominic Lockhart (6); Asts: Paul Zipser (3) | | Pts: Ceslavs Mateikovics (11); Rebs: Sandis Ceplitis (10); Asts: Oskars Reinfelds (4) |

Osnovna Skola Jugoslavija, Bar
Attendance: 34
Referees: Zoran Sutulovic, Florin Grigoras, Anton Makhlin

August 15
14:15

Report

| Denmark | 77–72 | Germany |
Scoring by quarter: 24–18, 21–17, 12–18, 20–19
| Pts: Peter Moeller (18); Rebs: Adam Holm-Weber (6); Asts: Anders Hansen (5) | | Pts: Mauricio Marin (17); Rebs: Dominic Lockhart (8); Asts: three players (3) |

Osnovna Skola Jugoslavija, Bar
Attendance: 40
Referees: Radomir Vojinovic, Anton Makhlin, Matthew John Beattie

August 15
16:30

Report

| Israel | 62–65 | Latvia |
Scoring by quarter: 17–15, 11–18, 12–14, 22–18
| Pts: Maxim Kikus (18); Rebs: Adar Ben Aliza, Egor Koulechov (7); Asts: Ishai Kislev (4) | | Pts: Ceslavs Mateikovics (23); Rebs: Ceslavs Mateikovics (9); Asts: Oskars Reinfelds (6) |

Osnovna Skola Jugoslavija, Bar
Attendance: 25
Referees: Johann Jeanneau, Aleksandar Glisic, Jonas Bille

== Knockout round ==
=== Championship ===
Quarter-finals
August 13 – Bar
Croatia | 81
Russia | 65
August 13 – Bar
Spain | 57
France | 56
August 13 – Bar
Serbia | 62
Turkey | 64
August 13 – Bar
Montenegro | 55
Lithuania | 56

Semi-finals
August 14 – Bar
Croatia | 86
Spain | 82
August 14 – Bar
Turkey | 65
Lithuania | 80

Final
August 15 – Bar
Croatia | 80
Lithuania | 52
Third place
August 15 – Bar
Spain | 64
Turkey | 75

==== Quarterfinals ====
August 13
14:15

Report

| Croatia | 81–65 | Russia |
Scoring by quarter: 15–16, 17–20, 22–14, 27–15
| Pts: Dario Šarić (34); Rebs: Dario Šarić (9); Asts: Martin Junakovic (4) | | Pts: Vasily Martynov (14); Rebs: Stanislav Ilnitskiy (10); Asts: four players (2) |

Sportska Dvorana Topolica, Bar
Attendance: 550
Referees: Johann Jeanneau, Nikolaos Somos, Jurgis Laurinavicius

August 13
16:30

Report

| Serbia | 62–64 | Turkey |
Scoring by quarter: 17–12, 7–9, 16–30, 22–13
| Pts: Vasilije Micić (19); Rebs: Nikola Janković (7); Asts: three players (2) | | Pts: Tayfun Erülkü (25); Rebs: Burak Haciismail (9); Asts: Kenan Sipahi (3) |

Sportska Dvorana Topolica, Bar
Attendance: 2,000
Referees: Miguel Perez Perez, Gentian Cici, Sérgio Silva

August 13
18:45

Report

| Spain | 57–56 | France |
Scoring by quarter: 12–18, 22–12, 6–12, 17–14
| Pts: Albert Homs (16); Rebs: Willy Hernangómez, Albert Homs (6); Asts: Albert Homs (5) | | Pts: Alexandre Chassang (16); Rebs: Benjamin Sene (9); Asts: Alexandre Chassang (2) |

Sportska Dvorana Topolica, Bar
Referees: Paolo Taurino, Petar Obradovic, Igor Mitrovski

August 13
21:00

Report

| Montenegro | 55–56 | Lithuania |
Scoring by quarter: 14–10, 19–18, 14–12, 8–16
| Pts: Nikola Ivanović (14); Rebs: Nikola Ivanović (9); Asts: Nikola Ivanović (6) | | Pts: Justas Tamulis (20); Rebs: Denis Krestinin (8); Asts: Lukas Lekavičius (4) |

Sportska Dvorana Topolica, Bar
Attendance: 3,500
Referees: Boris Schmidt, Marcin Kowalski, Ingus Baumanis

==== Semifinals ====
August 14
18:45

Report

| Croatia | 86–82 | Spain |
Scoring by quarter: 22–18, 15–22, 18–14, 31–28
| Pts: Dario Šarić (24); Rebs: Dario Šarić (9); Asts: Dario Šarić (7) | | Pts: Josep Perez (26); Rebs: Albert Homs, Javier Marin (6); Asts: Javier Marin (4) |

Sportska Dvorana Topolica, Bar
Attendance: 1000
Referees: Boris Schmidt, Marcin Kowalski, Nikolaos Somos

August 14
21:00

Report

| Turkey | 65–80 | Lithuania |
Scoring by quarter: 12–20, 13–20, 14–15, 26–25
| Pts: Kenan Sipahi (15); Rebs: Mehmet Sözen (9); Asts: Kenan Sipahi (6) | | Pts: Augustinas Jankaitis (17); Rebs: Augustinas Jankaitis (9); Asts: Jokūbas Gintvainis (6) |

Sportska Dvorana Topolica, Bar
Attendance: 500
Referees: Johann Jeanneau, Radomir Vojinovic, Igor Mitrovski

==== Bronze medal game ====
August 15
18:45

Report

| Spain | 64–75 | Turkey |
Scoring by quarter: 17–25, 13–18, 17–16, 17–16
| Pts: Agusti Sans (16); Rebs: Willy Hernangómez (10); Asts: Albert Homs (3) | | Pts: Talat Altunbey (18); Rebs: Talat Altunbey (8); Asts: Tayfun Erülkü (7) |

Sportska Dvorana Topolica, Bar
Attendance: 800
Referees: Sreten Radovic, Igor Mitrovski, Sérgio Silva

==== Final ====
August 15
21:00

Report

| Croatia | 80–52 | Lithuania |
Scoring by quarter: 30–6, 17–26, 18–7, 15–13
| Pts: Dario Šarić (30); Rebs: Dario Šarić (11); Asts: Dario Šarić (11) | | Pts: Denis Krestinin (14); Rebs: Denis Krestinin (7); Asts: Paulius Naraskevicius (3) |

Sportska Dvorana Topolica, Bar
Attendance: 3,000
Referees: Paolo Taurino, Zoran Sutulovic, Miguel Perez Perez

=== 5th–8th playoffs ===
Semi-finals
August 14 – Bar
Russia | 51
France | 68
August 14 – Bar
Serbia | 78
Montenegro | 74

Fifth place
August 15 – Bar
France | 45
Serbia | 55
Seventh place
August 15 – Bar
Russia | 78
Montenegro | 64

==== 5th–8th semifinals ====
August 14
14:15

Report

| Russia | 51–68 | France |
Scoring by quarter: 16–22, 9–11, 15–16, 11–19
| Pts: Rostislav Karenin (9); Rebs: Rostislav Karenin (8); Asts: Oleg Alferov (2) | | Pts: Anthony Racine (22); Rebs: Damien Inglis (9); Asts: Benjamin Sene (5) |

Sportska Dvorana Topolica, Bar
Attendance: 50
Referees: Sreten Radovic, Ismail Özgün, Haris Bijedic

August 14
16:30

Report

| Serbia | 78–74 | Montenegro |
Scoring by quarter: 24–18, 14–22, 23–16, 17–19
| Pts: Nikola Jankovic (21); Rebs: Nikola Jankovic (13); Asts: Nikola Radicevic, Vasilje Micic (4) | | Pts: Nikola Ivanovic (29); Rebs: Milos Pajovic (5); Asts: Nikola Ivanovic, Armin Nisic (4) |

Sportska Dvorana Topolica, Bar
Attendance: 700
Referees: Miguel Perez Perez, Jurgis Laurinavicius, Sérgio Silva

==== 7th place playoff ====
August 15
09:00

Report

| Russia | 78–64 | Montenegro |
Scoring by quarter: 14–15, 19–19, 26–16, 19–14
| Pts: Stanislav Ilnitskiy (19); Rebs: Stanislav Ilnitskiy (9); Asts: Serdar Annaev (3) | | Pts: Nikola Ivanovic (25); Rebs: Milos Pajovic (8); Asts: Nikola Ivanovic (5) |

Sportska Dvorana Topolica, Bar
Attendance: 200
Referees: Petar Obradovic, Ingus Baumanis, Ismail Özgün

==== 5th place playoff ====
August 15
16:30

Report

| France | 45–55 | Serbia |
Scoring by quarter: 10–17, 9–15, 14–13, 12–10
| Pts: Anthony Racine, Mouhammadou Jaiteh (11); Rebs: Mouhammadou Jaiteh (11); Asts: Alexandre Chassang (2) | | Pts: Nikola Radicevic (16); Rebs: Nikola Jankovic (6); Asts: Vasilje Micic (8) |

Sportska Dvorana Topolica, Bar
Attendance: 500
Referees: Boris Schmidt, Jurgis Laurinavicius, Florin Grigoras

=== 9th–12th playoffs ===
Semi-finals
August 13 – Bar
Italy | 76
Poland | 61
August 13 – Bar
Bulgaria | 67
Greece | 78

Ninth place
August 14 – Bar
Italy | 67
Greece | 53
Eleventh place
August 14 – Bar
Poland | 68
Bulgaria | 43

==== 9th–12th semifinals ====
August 13
18:45

Report

| Italy | 76–61 | Poland |
Scoring by quarter: 18–23, 22–23, 17–4, 19–11
| Pts: Amedeo Tessitori (24); Rebs: Amedeo Tessitori (9); Asts: Corrado Bianconi (5) | | Pts: Filip Struski (13); Rebs: Filip Struski (7); Asts: Jan Grzelinski (5) |

Sportska Dvorana Topolica, Bar
Attendance: 50

August 13
21:00

Report

| Bulgaria | 67–78 | Greece |
Scoring by quarter: 10–18, 18–15, 10–25, 29–20
| Pts: Deyan Karamfilov (15); Rebs: Denis Titov (5); Asts: Deyan Karamfilov (5) | | Pts: Alexandros Mitsialos (14); Rebs: Ioannis Papapetrou (10); Asts: Ioannis Karamalegkos (5) |

Sportska Dvorana Topolica, Bar
Attendance: 20

==== 11th place playoff ====
August 14
18:45

Report

| Poland | 68–43 | Bulgaria |
Scoring by quarter: 20–11, 17–10, 17–11, 14–11
| Pts: Daniel Szymkiewicz (15); Rebs: Filip Struski (8); Asts: Daniel Szymkiewicz (7) | | Pts: Kris Minkov (14); Rebs: Nikolay Stoyanov (6); Asts: Deyan Karamfilov (6) |

Osnova Skola Jugoslavija, Bar
Attendance: 30
Referees: Petar Obradovic, Yaari Rainisch, Jonas Bille

==== 9th place playoff ====
August 14
21:00

Report

| Italy | 67–53 | Greece |
Scoring by quarter: 14–16, 18–11, 19–11, 16–15
| Pts: Aristide Landi (22); Rebs: Francesco Candussi, Amedeo Tessitori (6); Asts: Matteo Imbrò (4) | | Pts: Kyprianos Maragkos (14); Rebs: Dimitrios Agravanis (7); Asts: Ioannis Karamalegkos (4) |

Osnova Skola Jugoslavija, Bar
Referees: Ingus Baumanis, Aleksandar Glisic, Matthew John Beattie

== Final standings ==
| Rank | Team | Record |
|---|---|---|
| 1st place, gold medalist(s) | Croatia | 7–2 |
| 2nd place, silver medalist(s) | Lithuania | 4–5 |
| 3rd place, bronze medalist(s) | Turkey | 5–4 |
| 4th | Spain | 6–3 |
| 5th | Serbia | 7–2 |
| 6th | France | 6–3 |
| 7th | Russia | 4–5 |
| 8th | Montenegro | 5–3 |
| 9th | Italy | 4–4 |
| 10th | Greece | 2–6 |
| 11th | Poland | 2–6 |
| 12th | Bulgaria | 3–5 |
| 13th | Germany | 5–4 |
| 14th | Latvia | 4–5 |
| 15th | Israel | 4–5 |
| 16th | Denmark | 2–7 |

2010 FIBA Europe Under-16 Championship winner

Croatia
Second title

Team roster

Mislav Brzoja, Martin Junaković, Karlo Lebo, Ivan Jukić, Dino Šamanić, Dario Šarić, Dominik Mavra, Antonio Črnjević, Tomislav Radoš, Nikola Urli, Daniel Zovko, Filip Bundović
Head coach: Dražen Brajković

| Relegated to the 2011 FIBA Europe Under-16 Championship Division B |

== Awards ==
Most Valuable Player

(Croatia) Dario Šarić

All-Tournament Team

- (Spain) Josep Perez
- (Montenegro) Nikola Ivanović
- (Turkey) Tayfun Erüklü
- (Croatia) Dario Šarić
- (Serbia) Nikola Janković

== Statistical leaders ==
Points

| Name | PPG |
|---|---|
| (Croatia) Dario Šarić | 24.3 |
| (Montenegro) Nikola Ivanović | 22.8 |
| (Poland) Daniel Szymkiewicz | 17.4 |
| (Greece) Paris Maragkos | 14.9 |
| (Israel) Egor Koulechov | 14.6 |

Rebounds

| Name | RPG |
|---|---|
| (Croatia) Dario Šarić | 11.5 |
| (Serbia) Nikola Janković | 8.8 |
| (Bulgaria) Nikolay Stoyanov | 8.8 |
| (Spain) Willy Hernangómez | 8.7 |
| (Germany) Dominic Lockhart | 8.2 |

Assists

| Name | APG |
|---|---|
| (Bulgaria) Deyan Karamfilov | 5.9 |
| (Croatia) Dario Šarić | 5.8 |
| (Serbia) Vasilije Micić | 5.1 |
| (Montenegro) Nikola Ivanović | 5.0 |
| (Italy) Metteo Imbrò | 5.0 |

Blocks

| Name | BPG |
|---|---|
| (Denmark) Rasmus Larsen | 2.6 |
| (Lithuania) Denis Krestinin | 2.1 |
| (Serbia) Nikola Janković | 1.6 |
| (Croatia) Dario Šarić | 1.4 |
| (Greece) Diamantis Slaftsakis | 1.4 |

Steals

| Name | SPG |
|---|---|
| (Poland) Daniel Szymkiewicz | 4.1 |
| (Montenegro) Nikola Ivanović | 3.1 |
| (Bulgaria) Deyan Karamfilov | 3.0 |
| (Croatia) Mislav Brzoja | 2.9 |
| (Israel) Egor Koulechov | 2.3 |
