= Dani Díez =

Spanish basketball player (born 1993)

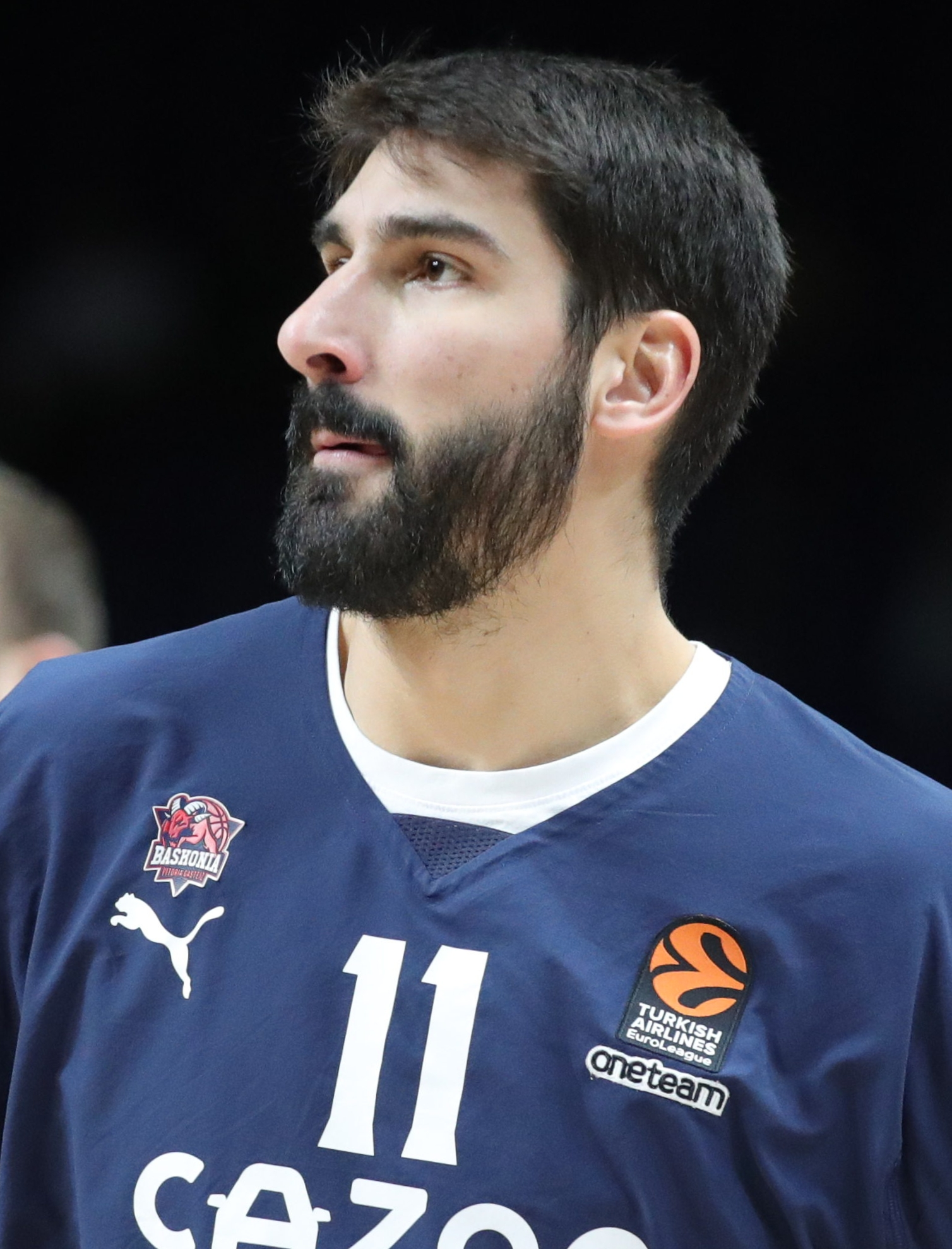
- Díez in 2023

No. 11 – San Pablo Burgos
- Position: Small forward / power forward
- League: Liga ACB; EuroCup

Personal information
- Born: 17 May 1993 (age 33) Madrid, Spain
- Listed height: 2.01 m (6 ft 7 in)
- Listed weight: 100 kg (220 lb)

Career information
- NBA draft: 2015: 2nd round, 54th overall pick
- Drafted by: Utah Jazz
- Playing career: 2010–present

Career history
- 2010–2015: Real Madrid
- 2010–2012: → Real Madrid B
- 2012–2013: → Gipuzkoa
- 2014–2015: → Gipuzkoa
- 2015–2019: Unicaja Málaga
- 2019–2021: CB Canarias
- 2021–2022: San Pablo Burgos
- 2022–2024: Saski Baskonia
- 2024–present: San Pablo Burgos

Career highlights
- EuroCup champion (2017); FIBA Intercontinental Cup champion (2020); Spanish Cup winner (2012); Spanish Supercup (2013); ACB Best Young Player Award (2015)
- Stats at Basketball Reference
Medals
Men's basketball
Representing Spain
U20 European Championship
Bronze medal – third place	2013 Estonia	U20 Team
Bronze medal – third place	2012 Slovenia	U20 Team
U18 European Championship
Gold medal – first place	2011 Poland	U18 Team
U16 European Championship
Gold medal – first place	2009 Lithuania	U16 Team

Daniel Díez de la Faya (born 17 May 1993) is a Spanish professional basketball player for San Pablo Burgos of the Spanish Liga ACB. He also represents the Spanish national team in international competition. He was selected by Utah Jazz in the 2015 NBA Draft.

== Professional career ==
=== Spanish League ===
Díez started his playing career in 2005 in the U-14 Adecco Estudiantes, team that left to join the U-18 Real Madrid Baloncesto in 2009.

The following season, 2009–10, he debuted for the Real Madrid Baloncesto B team in LEB Plata League.

During the 2011–12 season he became one of the more important Real Madrid Baloncesto B players, coached by Alberto Angulo, and also began to train and travel with the Real Madrid first team. Díez finally debuted in the ACB League, in the match against Assignia Manresa played on 18 December 2011.

In June 2012 he was invited to the Adidas Eurocamp in Treviso (Italy), one of Europe's best showcase for young players. He completed a fantastic tournament, scoring 16 points in the final game, and was named the Eurocamp's top small forward.

During the 2012–13 season he played on loan for ACB League's Lagun Aro GBC. In the preseason he was one of the most outstanding players of his new team, averaging 10.2 points and 4 rebounds. In Week 5 of the Spanish League he had his personal best game with 17 points.

In the summer of 2013, he returned to Real Madrid, becoming a more standard part of the 12-men roster that won the Spanish League championship and finished second in the 2012–13 Euroleague. On 27 August, Díez started the preparation for the pre-season along with his teammates. On 5 October they obtained the first title of the season, the Spanish Supercup, by defeating Barcelona in the final by the score of 83–79.

In September 2014, Díez was loaned again to Gipuzkoa Basket. He was named MVP of week 20 of the 2014–15 ACB season, after obtaining 32 points and 36 in PIR against Andorra. He has also been included in the best team of the 2014–15 ACB season in weeks 15, 20 and 31.

On 19 May 2015, Díez was named the Best Young Player of the competition, after averaging in his second year with Gipuzkoa Basket 12.6 points and 7.0 rebounds per game.

On 8 July 2015, Díez signed a two-year contract with Unicaja. In April 2017, Díez won the EuroCup with Unicaja after beating Valencia BC in the Finals.

On 5 July 2019, Díez signed a two-years deal with an option for a third season with Iberostar Tenerife of the Liga ACB. He extended his contract until 2023 on 3 July 2020.

On 19 July 2021, Díez signed a one-year deal with San Pablo Burgos of the Spanish Liga ACB. San Pablo Burgos also plays in the Basketball Champions League.

On August 3, 2022, Díez signed with Saski Baskonia of the Spanish Liga ACB. On July 5, 2023, he renewed his contract with the team.

On 4 July 2024, Díez signed with Longevida San Pablo Burgos of the Spanish Primera FEB.

=== NBA draft rights ===
On 25 June 2015, Díez was selected with the 54th pick of the 2015 NBA draft by the Utah Jazz and his rights were afterwards traded to the Portland Trail Blazers for cash considerations. On February 9, 2023, Díez's draft rights were traded to the New York Knicks in a four-team trade involving the Trail Blazers, Philadelphia 76ers and Charlotte Hornets.

On 27 June 2024, Diez's rights were traded back to the Portland Trail Blazers as part of a package for Tyler Kolek.

== National team career ==
In 2009, Díez won the gold medal with the Spain U-16 national team at the 2009 FIBA U16 European Championship.

In July 2010 he played at the 2010 FIBA Under-17 World Cup, in Hamburg (Germany). He led Spain in scoring and rebounding, with averages of 12.9 points and 7 rebounds per game.

In the summer of 2011 he won the gold medal at the 2011 FIBA U18 European Championship, being selected to the All-Tournament Team. He averaged 12.2 points and 10.4 rebounds in 26.6 minutes per game over the competition.

In July 2012 he played with the Spain U-20 national team and obtained the bronze medal at the 2012 FIBA U20 European Championship. Despite being only 19 years old, he was selected to the All-Tournament Team, averaging 14.3 points and 5.9 rebounds per game, with a 56% field goal percentage. Díez was the leading scorer and rebounder for Spain, playing both forward positions.

In the summer of 2013 he won the bronze medal again, this time at the 2013 FIBA U20 European Championship. Dani Díez continued to improve his game to become one of the most important players for Spain, which resulted in him being selected to the All-Tournament Team for the 3rd consecutive year. His averages improved significantly compared to previous years, to 18.7 points (top scorer of the tournament) and 8.8 rebounds per game.

Dani Díez has played 9 times with the Spain national team.

== Career statistics ==
Legend
GP	Games played	GS	Games started	MPG	Minutes per game
FG%	Field-goal percentage	3P%	3-point field-goal percentage	FT%	Free-throw percentage
RPG	Rebounds per game	APG	Assists per game	SPG	Steals per game
BPG	Blocks per game	PPG	Points per game	PIR	Performance index rating
**Bold**	Career high

=== EuroLeague ===
Year	Team	GP	GS	MPG	FG%	3P%	FT%	RPG	APG	SPG	BPG	PPG	PIR
2013–14	Real Madrid	24	0	7.9	.475	.267	.250	.8	.3	.3	—	1.8	1.5
2015–16	Málaga	24	4	**18.3**	.494	.396	.750	**3.5**	.4	**.4**	.0	**5.0**	**6.6**
2017–18	Málaga	23	6	13.6	.487	.343	**.800**	2.1	**.8**	.3	.0	4.2	5.1
2022–23	Baskonia	25	6	9.2	**.512**	**.514**	.714	1.8	.4	.3	**.1**	2.7	3.2
2023–24	Baskonia	**30**	**14**	12.0	.441	.375	.750	2.1	.5	.2	—	2.4	3.3
Career		126	30	12.2	.482	.392	.707	2.1	.5	.3	.0	3.2	3.9

=== EuroLeague ===
Year	Team	GP	GS	MPG	FG%	3P%	FT%	RPG	APG	SPG	BPG	PPG	PIR
2016–17	Málaga	**22**	**11**	**17.1**	**.469**	**.469**	.857	**3.1**	.3	.2	**.1**	**5.0**	**5.7**
2018–19	Málaga	18	1	13.6	**.469**	.360	**1.000**	2.4	**.7**	**.3**	—	4.4	**5.7**
Career		40	12	15.5	.469	.414	.875	2.8	.5	.3	.1	4.8	5.7

=== Basketball Champions League ===
Year	Team	GP	GS	MPG	FG%	3P%	FT%	RPG	APG	SPG	BPG	PPG
2019–20	Canarias	**17**	**10**	**22.8**	.485	.344	.583	**5.3**	.9	**.8**	**.1**	7.6
2020–21	Canarias	4	1	8.8	**1.000**	**1.000**	—	.2	.2	.2	—	2.2
2021–22	San Pablo Burgos	8	4	21.6	.542	.467	**.800**	4.2	**1.0**	.4	—	**9.2**
Career		29	15	20.5	.513	.402	.682	4.3	.9	.6	—	7.3

=== Domestic leagues ===
Year	Team	League	GP	MPG	FG%	3P%	FT%	RPG	APG	SPG	BPG	PPG
2011–12	(Spain) Real Madrid	ACB	3	2.9	.000	.000	—	.3	—	—	—	0.0
2012–13	(Spain) Donosti Gipuzkoa	ACB	31	12.2	.447	.268	.560	1.6	.1	.3	.0	3.8
2013–14	(Spain) Real Madrid	ACB	35	9.6	.372	.271	.727	1.2	.4	.4	.1	2.6
2014–15	(Spain) Donosti Gipuzkoa	ACB	30	29.6	.480	.414	.721	6.8	.5	1.0	.0	12.1
2015–16	(Spain) Málaga	ACB	36	15.5	.391	.311	.735	3.2	.6	.4	.1	5.0
2016–17	(Spain) Málaga	ACB	38	18.5	.420	.303	.761	3.8	.5	.4	—	5.6
2017–18	(Spain) Málaga	ACB	31	15.1	.429	.329	.795	3.0	.9	.6	.1	5.8
2018–19	(Spain) Málaga	ACB	32	14.8	.460	.346	.786	3.0	.5	.7	.1	4.8
2019–20	(Spain) Canarias	ACB	26	25.8	.519	.435	.824	5.8	1.0	.5	.0	8.7
2020–21	(Spain) Canarias	ACB	10	12.3	.471	.400	.800	1.7	.2	.5	.0	2.4
2021–22	(Spain) San Pablo Burgos	ACB	27	22.5	.542	.524	.722	5.7	.7	.4	.0	7.9
2022–23	(Spain) Baskonia	ACB	31	14.8	.495	.457	.714	2.8	.8	.4	.1	4.8
2023–24	(Spain) Baskonia	ACB	30	12.9	.508	.455	.500	2.3	.2	.5	.1	2.8

== Individual awards ==
- 2011 FIBA U18 European Championship: All Tournament Team
- 2012 FIBA U20 European Championship: All Tournament Team
- 2013 FIBA U20 European Championship: All Tournament Team
- ACB Best Young Player Award: 2015
