= Fotios Zoumpos =

Greek basketball player

Fotios Zoumpos Φώτης Ζούμπος
Personal information
- Born: April 4, 1993 (age 33) Cholargos, Athens, Greece
- Listed height: 6 ft 4.75 in (1.95 m)
- Listed weight: 190 lb (86 kg)

Career information
- Playing career: 2010–present
- Position: Point guard / shooting guard

Career history
- 2010–2012: Panathinaikos
- 2012–2013: Peristeri
- 2013–2014: Ilysiakos
- 2014–2015: Ethnikos Piraeus
- 2015–2018: Panelefsiniakos
- 2018–2022: Apollon Patras
- 2022–2024: Milon

Career highlights
- EuroLeague champion (2011); Greek League champion (2011); Greek Cup winner (2012); 2x Greek A2 Elite League champion (2021, 2024)

Fotios Zoumpos (alternate spellings: Fotis, Zoubos) (Greek: Φώτης Ζούμπος; born April 4, 1993) is a Greek professional basketball player. He is 6 ft 4 3/4 in (1.95 m) tall and weighs 190 lb (86 kg). He plays at both the point guard and shooting guard positions.

== Professional career ==
Zoumpos began his professional career during the 2010–2011 campaign with the Greek Basket League powerhouse Panathinaikos and was a minor part of the EuroLeague-winning squad of that season.

During the 2020–2021 season with Apollon Patras, Zoumpos averaged 11.8 points, 3.8 rebounds and 3.1 assists, shooting with 40.8% from beyond the arc, 61.7% from the field, and 60% from the free throw line. The team achieved promotion to the Greek Basket League and Zoumpos renewed his contract with them for a fourth season on August 11, 2021. In 18 games during the 2021-22 campaign, he averaged only 2 points, 1.5 rebounds and 0.9 assists, playing around 11 minutes per game.

On July 12, 2022, Zoumpos moved to Milonas Neas Smyrnis.

== National team career ==
Zoumpos was a member of the Greek junior national teams. He played at the 2009 FIBA Europe Under-16 Championship, the 2011 FIBA Europe Under-18 Championship, and the 2012 FIBA Europe Under-20 Championship.

== Career statistics ==
Legend
GP	Games played	GS	Games started	MPG	Minutes per game
FG%	Field-goal percentage	3P%	3-point field-goal percentage	FT%	Free-throw percentage
RPG	Rebounds per game	APG	Assists per game	SPG	Steals per game
BPG	Blocks per game	PPG	Points per game	PIR	Performance index rating
**Bold**	Career high

=== EuroLeague ===
†	Denotes seasons in which Zoumpos won the EuroLeague

Year	Team	GP	GS	MPG	FG%	3P%	FT%	RPG	APG	SPG	BPG	PPG	PIR
2010–11†	Panathinaikos	2	0	3.0	.500	.000	—	—	—	—	—	1.0	0.5
Career		2	0	3.0	.500	.000	—	—	—	—	—	1.0	0.5

== Awards and accomplishments ==
=== Pro career ===
- EuroLeague EuroLeague Champion: (2011)
- Greek League Champion: (2011)
- Greek Cup Winner: (2012)
