= Paris Maragkos =

Greek basketball player

Paris Maragkos Πάρης Μαραγκός
Anorthosis Ammochostou
- Position: Power forward / center
- League: Cypriot League

Personal information
- Born: January 19, 1994 (age 32) Maroussi, Greece
- Listed height: 6 ft 9 in (2.06 m)
- Listed weight: 243 lb (110 kg)

Career information
- High school: Blue Ridge School (Saint George, Virginia)
- College: George Washington (2012–2014); American (2014–2016)
- NBA draft: 2017: undrafted
- Playing career: 2010–present

Career history
- 2010–2012: Panathinaikos
- 2016–2017: Olympiacos
- 2017–2018: Faros Larissas
- 2018–2019: Kymi
- 2019: Kolossos Rodou
- 2019–2020: Larisa
- 2020–2021: APOEL
- 2021–2023: Keravnos
- 2023–present: Anorthosis Ammochostou

Career highlights
- Greek Cup winner (2012); Greek League champion (2011); Cypriot League champion (2022); Cypriot Super Cup winner (2021); Jordan Brand Classic International Game (2010)

Kyprianos Ioannis "Paris" Maragkos (alternate spelling: Maragos) (Greek: Κυπριανός Ιωάννης "Πάρης" Μαραγκός; born January 19, 1994) is a Greek professional basketball player for Anorthosis Ammochostou of the Cypriot League. He is 2.06 m (6 ft 9 in) tall and he can play at both the power forward and center positions.

== High school career ==
Maragkos played high school basketball at the private Blue Ridge High School, in Saint George, Virginia. He led his team to a 20–7 overall record, and a VISAA state semifinals appearance in 2012, averaging 10.9 points, 6.5 rebounds, and 1.3 blocks per game.

== College career ==
Maragkos played college basketball at George Washington University, with the George Washington Colonials, from 2012 to 2014.

Due to his limited playing time with George Washington, he transferred in 2014, to American University. During his first season with the American Eagles, he averaged 7.1 points, 2.3 rebounds, and 0.9 assists per game. At the end of his junior season, Maragkos rejected an offer from the Greek 2nd Division club Kavala, in order to continue his playing spell in college basketball with American University.

== Club career ==
After playing with the junior youth teams of Panathinaikos, Maragkos made his debut at the professional level with Panathinaikos, on October 31, 2010, in the top-tier Greek Basket League, during the 2010–11 season, at age 16. His first game in the top Greek League came against Ilysiakos, in a game that Panathinaikos won, by a score of 81–62. Maragkos logged 2 minutes of playing time in his debut game.

He played in 2 games total in Greece's top pro league in the 2010–11 season, averaging 4.9 minutes per game. However, he retained his amateur status, thus making him eligible to play college basketball. In 2012, he left Panathinaikos, in order to study and play college basketball in the United States.

In 2016, he signed a 4-year contract with the Greek club Olympiacos, but only played sparingly during his single season with the EuroLeague team.

On September 5, 2017, he signed with Faros Larissas. On December 30, 2017, Maragkos achieved a career high scoring 29 points in a 106–79 defeat against AEK. He had 9/9 two-pointers and 3/4 three-point shots.

Maragkos spent the 2019–20 season with Larisa of the Greek Basket League. In six games he averaged 0.7 points and 1.5 rebounds per game. On September 26, 2020, Maragkos signed with APOEL B.C.

== National team career ==
Maragkos was a member of the junior national teams of Greece. With Greece's junior national teams, he played at the following tournaments: the 2008, 2009, and 2010 editions of the FIBA Europe Under-16 Championship, the 2011 FIBA Europe Under-18 Championship, and the 2014 FIBA Europe Under-20 Championship.
