= Samet Geyik =

Turkish basketball player (born 1993)

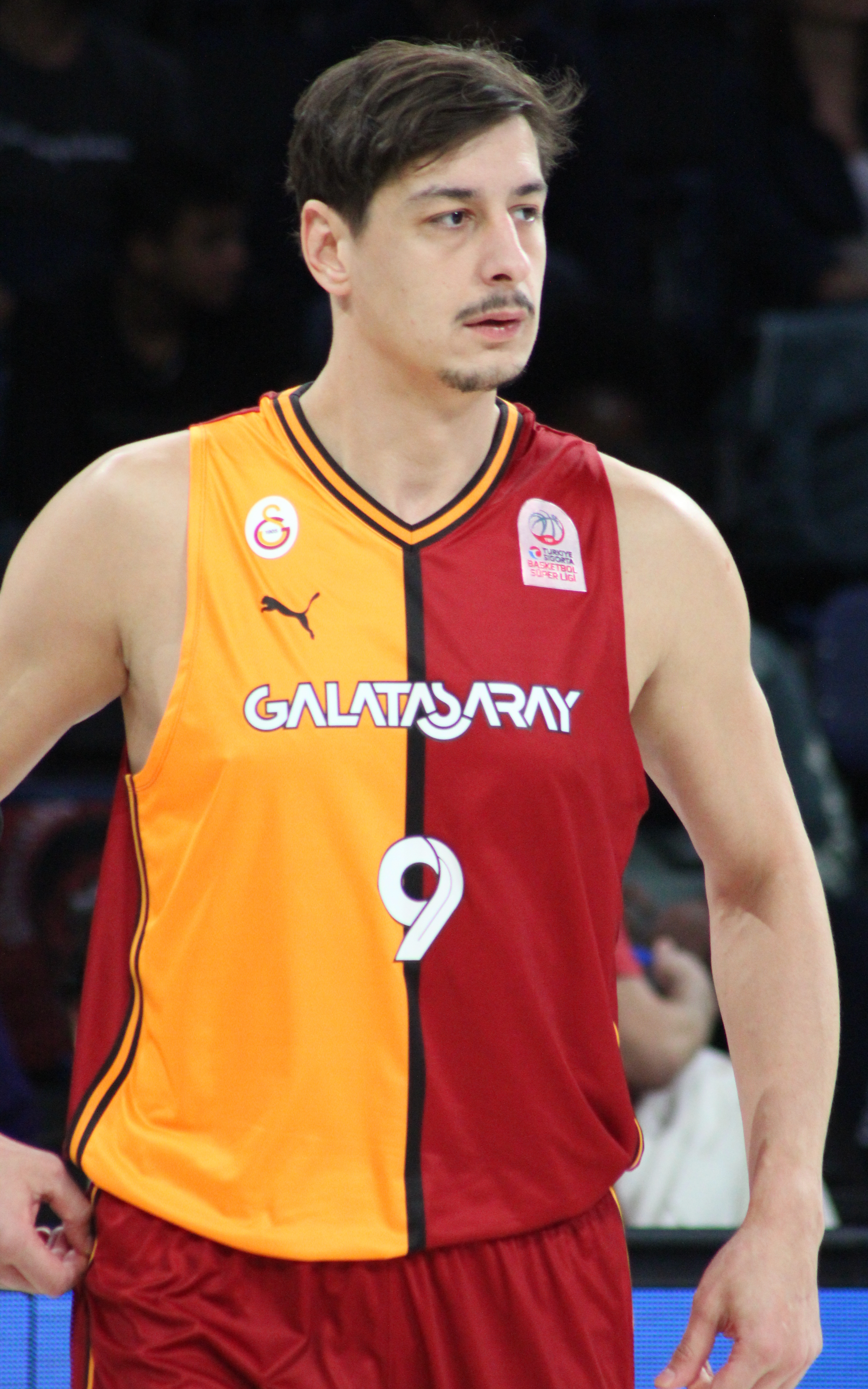

No. 4 – Gaziantep Basketbol
- Position: Power forward
- League: TBL

Personal information
- Born: 12 January 1993 (age 33) Manisa, Turkey
- Listed height: 6 ft 9 in (2.06 m)
- Listed weight: 215 lb (98 kg)

Career information
- NBA draft: 2015: undrafted
- Playing career: 2009–present

Career history
- 2009–2010: Bornova Belediye
- 2010–2015: Tofaş
- 2015–2016: Darüşşafaka Doğuş
- 2016: → Pınar Karşıyaka
- 2016–2017: Anadolu Efes
- 2017–2020: Beşiktaş
- 2020–2022: Türk Telekom
- 2022–2023: Fenerbahçe Beko
- 2023–2025: Galatasaray Ekmas
- 2025–2026: Karşıyaka
- 2026–present: Gaziantep Basketbol
Medals
Men's basketball
Representing Turkey
FIBA Europe Under-18 Championship
Bronze medal – third place	2011 Wrocław	U-18 Team

Samet Geyik (born January 12, 1993) is a Turkish professional basketball player for Gaziantep Basketbol of the Türkiye Basketbol Ligi (TBL).

== Professional career ==
=== Bornova Belediye ===
Geyik began his career with Bornova Belediye in the 2009–10 season.

=== Tofaş ===
He moved to Tofaş Burşa in 2011.

=== Darüşşafaka Doğuş ===
He joined Darüşşafaka Doğuş for the 2015–16 season.

=== Pınar Karşıyaka (loan) ===
He moved to Pınar Karşıyaka in January 2016 on loan.

=== Anadolu Efes ===
He joined the Turkish EuroLeague club Efes Istanbul for the 2016–17 season.

=== Türk Telekom ===
On 25 June 2020 he signed with Türk Telekom of the Turkish Super League (BSL).

=== Fenerbahçe Beko ===
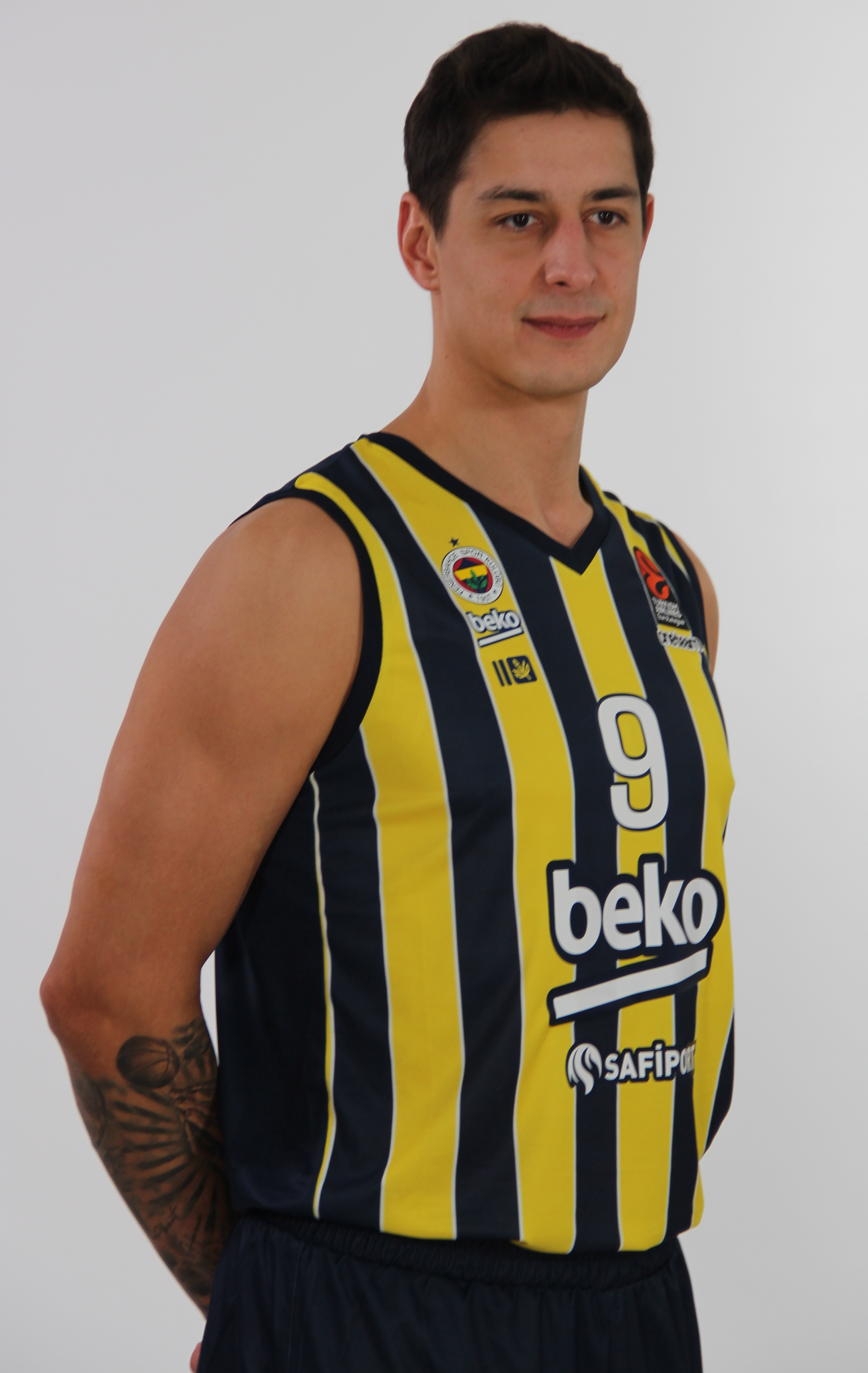

On 20 June 2022 he signed with Fenerbahçe Beko of the Basketball Super League (BSL).

=== Galatasaray ===
On 6 July 2023 he signed with Galatasaray Ekmas of the Basketball Super League (BSL).

On June 26, 2025, Galatasaray thanked the player and announced that they had parted ways.

=== Return to Karşıyaka ===
On July 30, 2025, he signed with Karşıyaka Basket of the Basketbol Süper Ligi (BSL).

=== Gaziantep Basketbol ===
On August 8, 2026, he signed with Gaziantep Basketbol of the Türkiye Basketbol Ligi (TBL).

== Turkish national team ==
Geyik was a regular member of the junior national teams of Turkey. With Turkey's junior national teams, he played at the 2009 FIBA Europe Under-16 Championship, the 2010 FIBA Europe Under-18 Championship, the 2011 FIBA Europe Under-18 Championship, the 2012 FIBA Europe Under-20 Championship, and the 2013 FIBA Europe Under-20 Championship. He won the bronze medal at the 2011 FIBA Europe Under-18 Championship.

He has also been a member of the senior men's Turkish national basketball team. With Turkey's senior team, he played at the 2016 FIBA World Olympic Qualifying Tournament - Manila.

== Career statistics ==
Legend
GP	Games played	GS	Games started	MPG	Minutes per game
FG%	Field-goal percentage	3P%	3-point field-goal percentage	FT%	Free-throw percentage
RPG	Rebounds per game	APG	Assists per game	SPG	Steals per game
BPG	Blocks per game	PPG	Points per game	PIR	Performance index rating
**Bold**	Career high

=== EuroLeague ===
Year	Team	GP	GS	MPG	FG%	3P%	FT%	RPG	APG	SPG	BPG	PPG	PIR
2022–23	Fenerbahçe	1	0	11.2	.500	.000	.000	1.0	1.0	1.0	1.0	2.0	3.0
Career		1	0	11.2	.500	.000	.000	1.0	1.0	1.0	1.0	2.0	3.0
