= Álex Abrines =

Spanish basketball player (born 1993)

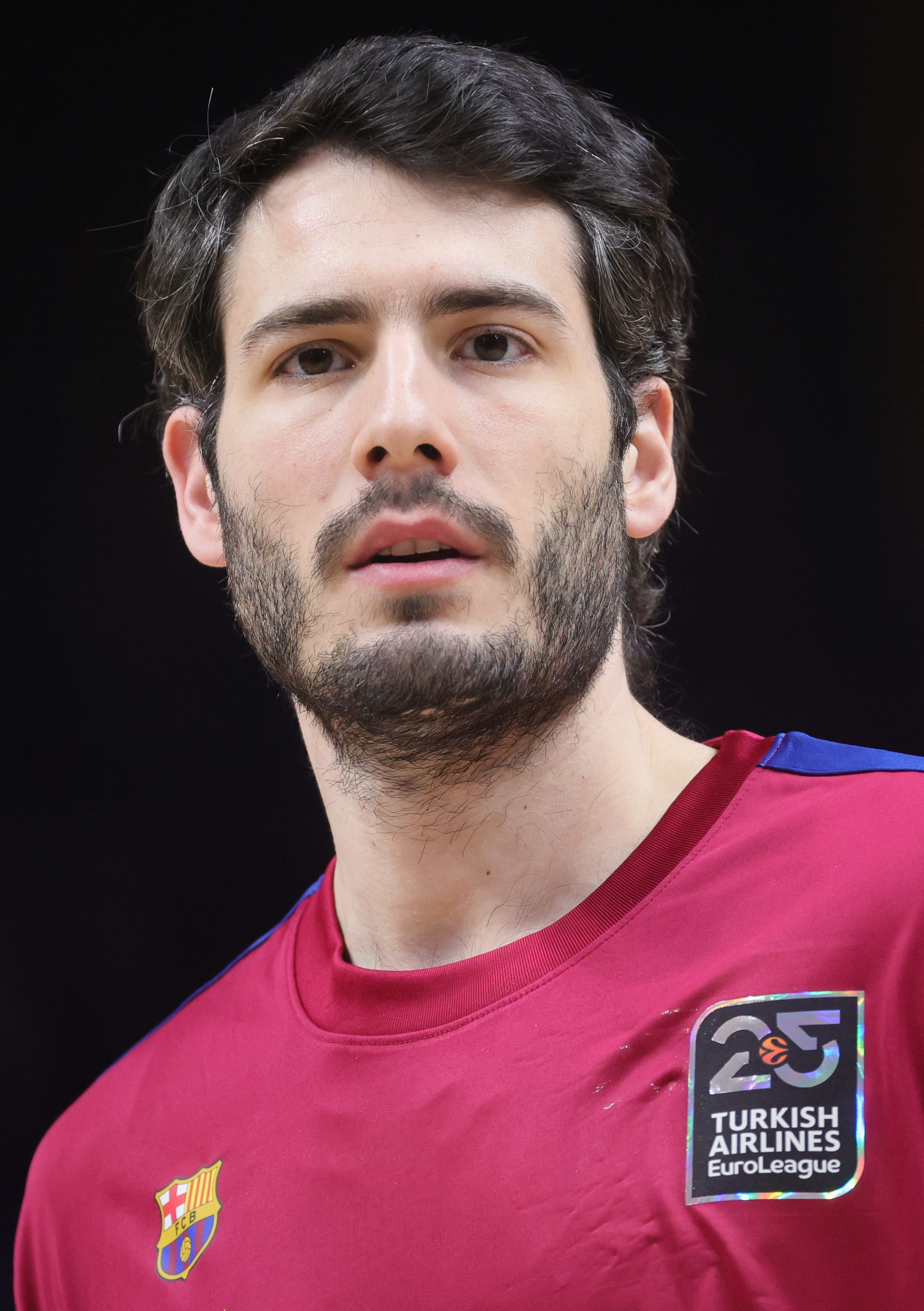
- Abrines with FC Barcelona in 2025

Personal information
- Born: 1 August 1993 (age 33) Palma, Spain
- Listed height: 6 ft 5 in (1.96 m)
- Listed weight: 190 lb (86 kg)

Career information
- NBA draft: 2013: 2nd round, 32nd overall pick
- Drafted by: Oklahoma City Thunder
- Playing career: 2010–2025
- Position: Small forward / shooting guard
- Number: 10, 21, 8

Career history
- 2010–2011: Axarquía
- 2011–2012: Unicaja Málaga
- 2011–2012: →Axarquía
- 2012–2016: FC Barcelona
- 2016–2019: Oklahoma City Thunder
- 2019–2025: FC Barcelona

Career highlights
- EuroLeague Rising Star (2016); 3× Spanish League champion (2014, 2021, 2023); 3× Spanish Cup winner (2013, 2021, 2022); Spanish Supercup winner (2015); FIBA Europe Under-18 Championship MVP (2011)

Career statistics
- Points: 924 (5.3 ppg)
- Rebounds: 248 (1.4 rpg)
- Assists: 88 (0.5 apg)
- Stats at NBA.com
- Stats at Basketball Reference
Medals
Men's basketball
Representing Spain
Olympic Games
Bronze medal – third place	2016 Rio de Janeiro	Team
EuroBasket
Bronze medal – third place	2017 Finland–Israel–Romania–Turkey
U20 European Championship
Bronze medal – third place	2012 Poland	Team
U18 European Championship
Gold medal – first place	2011 Poland	Team

Alejandro "Álex" Abrines Redondo (born 1 August 1993) is a Spanish former professional basketball player. He spent most of his career playing for FC Barcelona of the Liga ACB and the EuroLeague, acting as team captain for several seasons. Standing at 6 ft 6 in (1.98 m), he mainly played the shooting guard and small forward positions. Abrines has won three Spanish League championships with FC Barcelona in 2014, 2021 and 2023. He was selected for the EuroLeague Rising Star Award in 2016.

Born in Palma de Mallorca, Spain, Abrines began his career with CB Axarquía in 2010, playing professionally till 2025. He joined Baloncesto Málaga in 2011 and was loaned back to Axarquía in the 2011–12 season. Abrines moved to FC Barcelona in 2012. He declared for the 2013 NBA draft and was selected 32nd overall by the Oklahoma City Thunder. After three more seasons with FC Barcelona, Abrines joined the Thunder in 2016 and played three seasons with the team. He returned to FC Barcelona in 2019.

Abrines has represented Spain internationally since his junior years. Abrines won a bronze medal with Spain at the 2016 Summer Olympics.

== Professional career ==
=== Spain (2010–2016) ===
Between 2010 and 2012, Abrines played for Clínicas Rincón and Unicaja. He was traded to Spanish club FC Barcelona in July 2012.

On 27 June 2013, Abrines was selected by the Oklahoma City Thunder with the 32nd overall pick in the 2013 NBA draft.

On 19 May 2015, Abrines re-signed with Barcelona until 2019. In May 2016, he was named the EuroLeague Rising Star. He played four seasons for Barcelona, winning three titles with the club – one Spanish ACB league championship, one Spanish King's Cup, and one Spanish Supercup. On 19 July 2016, Abrines parted ways with Barcelona.

=== Oklahoma City Thunder (2016–2019) ===
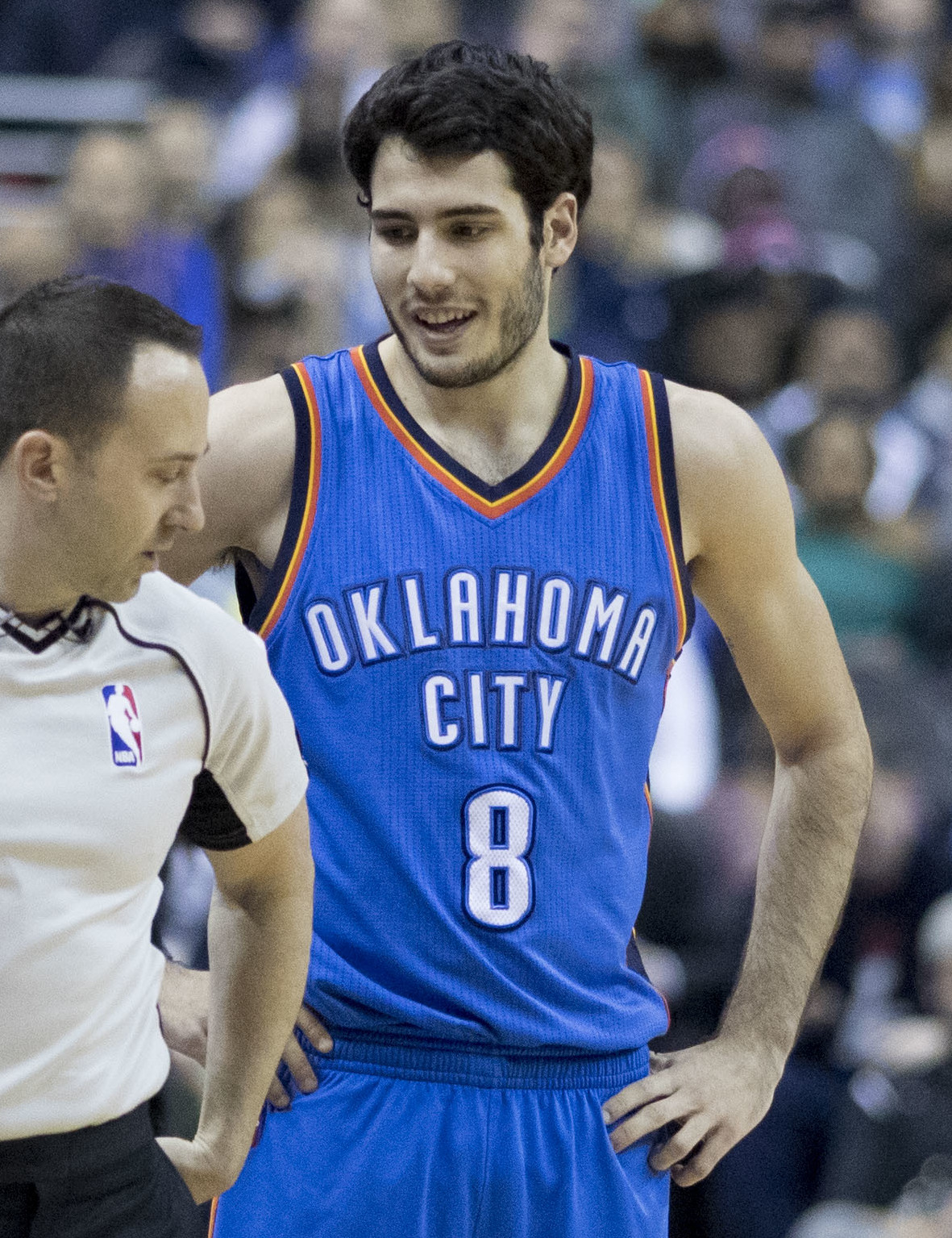
Abrines in 2017

On 23 July 2016, Abrines signed a three-year, $18 million contract with the Oklahoma City Thunder. He made his debut for the Thunder in their season opener on 26 October, scoring three points off the bench in a 103–97 victory over the Philadelphia 76ers. On 21 December, he hit five three-pointers and finished with a career-best 18 points in a 121–110 victory over the New Orleans Pelicans. On 24 February 2017, in his first career start, Abrines set a new career high with 19 points in a 110–93 win over the Los Angeles Lakers.

On 9 December 2017, Abrines, starting in place of the injured Paul George, scored a career-high 20 points in a narrow 102–101 overtime victory over the Memphis Grizzlies.

On 1 November 2018, Abrines had 25 points on five three-pointers in a 111–107 victory over the Charlotte Hornets. Later that month on 30 November, he scored 21 points off a career-high seven three-pointers in a 124–109 victory over the Atlanta Hawks.

On 9 February 2019, Abrines was waived by the Thunder. After sitting out a number of games, he and the team mutually decided to part ways, citing personal reasons.

=== Return to Spain (2019–2025) ===
On 12 July 2019, Abrines signed a two-year deal with FC Barcelona with the option of a third year. On 30 June 2021, he extended his contract with the team until 2026. Abrines suffered a knee injury a few months later on 17 September and was ruled out for four months. On 22 July 2025, Abrines announced his retirement from professional basketball on social media. He played ten seasons in total for the Catalans, appearing in 660 games and winning 15 titles.

== National team career ==
Abrines has played with the junior national teams of Spain. He won the gold medal at the 2011 FIBA Europe Under-18 Championship, where Abrines was named to the All-Tournament Team, as well as being named the tournament's MVP. He also played at the 2012 FIBA Europe Under-20 Championship, winning the bronze medal. In 2016, Abrines won a bronze medal at the Rio Olympics with the senior Spain national basketball team. He also played at EuroBasket 2017.

== Career statistics ==
Legend
GP	Games played	GS	Games started	MPG	Minutes per game
FG%	Field-goal percentage	3P%	3-point field-goal percentage	FT%	Free-throw percentage
RPG	Rebounds per game	APG	Assists per game	SPG	Steals per game
BPG	Blocks per game	PPG	Points per game	PIR	Performance index rating
**Bold**	Career high

=== NBA ===
==== Regular season ====
Year	Team	GP	GS	MPG	FG%	3P%	FT%	RPG	APG	SPG	BPG	PPG
2016–17	Oklahoma City	68	6	15.5	.393	**.381**	.898	1.3	**.6**	**.5**	.1	**6.0**
2017–18	Oklahoma City	**75**	**8**	15.1	**.395**	.380	.848	**1.5**	.4	**.5**	.1	4.7
2018–19	Oklahoma City	31	2	**19.0**	.357	.323	**.923**	**1.5**	**.6**	**.5**	**.2**	5.3
Career		174	16	16.0	.387	.368	.880	1.4	.5	.5	.1	5.3

==== Playoffs ====
Year	Team	GP	GS	MPG	FG%	3P%	FT%	RPG	APG	SPG	BPG	PPG
2017	Oklahoma City	5	0	16.0	.348	.294	.750	1.8	**.8**	—	—	**4.8**
2018	Oklahoma City	**6**	0	**18.3**	**.400**	**.462**	**1.000**	**2.7**	.3	**.8**	**.3**	4.0
Career		11	0	17.3	.372	.367	.833	2.3	.5	.5	.2	4.4

=== EuroLeague ===
Year	Team	GP	GS	MPG	FG%	3P%	FT%	RPG	APG	SPG	BPG	PPG	PIR
2011–12	Málaga	6	1	11.7	.217	.133	.750	1.2	.5	.3	**.3**	2.5	.8
2012–13	Barcelona	15	2	11.2	.446	.324	**1.000**	1.1	.3	.4	.1	5.1	4.0
2013–14	Barcelona	28	4	16.6	.456	.369	.769	1.3	.7	.4	.1	6.7	4.5
2014–15	Barcelona	23	3	18.2	.450	.341	.771	1.5	**1.7**	**.7**	.2	7.6	6.7
2015–16	Barcelona	25	2	**19.2**	.469	.417	.833	**2.2**	.8	.6	.1	**9.3**	**8.8**
2019–20	Barcelona	25	3	14.8	.465	.462	.833	2.1	.4	.6	.1	5.2	4.9
2020–21	Barcelona	**39**	**33**	18.4	.427	.423	.903	1.8	.7	.6	.2	6.1	4.7
2021–22	Barcelona	13	5	14.6	**.500**	**.511**	**1.000**	1.7	.2	.3	.2	7.0	5.0
2022–23	Barcelona	35	10	17.6	.456	.478	.853	2.0	.9	.6	.1	7.4	6.4
2023–24	Barcelona	27	3	17.3	.492	.448	.857	2.0	.5	.5	**.3**	6.9	6.6
2024–25	Barcelona	37	18	17.0	**.500**	.379	.913	2.1	.7	.5	.1	4.5	4.2
Career		273	84	16.5	.527	.414	.852	1.8	.7	.5	.2	6.4	5.4

=== Domestic leagues ===
Year	Team	League	GP	MPG	FG%	3P%	FT%	RPG	APG	SPG	BPG	PPG
2010–11	(Spain) Axarquía	LEB Oro	30	15.1	.370	.337	.647	1.8	.5	.6	.2	3.8
2011–12	(Spain) Axarquía	LEB Oro	16	27.9	.509	.453	.756	2.9	.7	1.8	.4	13.4
2011–12	(Spain) Málaga	ACB	18	16.4	.387	.283	.682	1.6	.4	.6	.2	4.8
2012–13	(Spain) Barcelona	ACB	33	10.5	.386	.288	.682	1.0	.2	.3	.2	3.3
2013–14	(Spain) Barcelona	ACB	42	17.8	.438	.406	.885	1.5	.9	.5	.2	6.9
2014–15	(Spain) Barcelona	ACB	37	17.7	.457	.447	.897	1.7	1.0	.7	.3	8.3
2015–16	(Spain) Barcelona	ACB	37	19.5	.470	.396	.860	2.3	1.1	.8	.2	8.9
2019–20	(Spain) Barcelona	ACB	28	18.1	.423	.367	.733	2.2	.6	.6	.2	5.5
2020–21	(Spain) Barcelona	ACB	39	19.6	.495	.435	.930	2.8	.9	.8	.2	7.8
2021–22	(Spain) Barcelona	ACB	23	12.7	.542	.561	.818	2.2	.5	.3	.2	5.7
2022–23	(Spain) Barcelona	ACB	35	18.7	.435	.416	.806	2.6	.7	.6	.2	7.1
2023–24	(Spain) Barcelona	ACB	31	17.7	.435	.448	.800	2.8	.6	.4	.1	6.3

== Awards and accomplishments ==
=== Club ===
- Spanish League: 2013–14, 2020–21, 2022–23
- Spanish Basketball Cup: 2013, 2021, 2022
- Spanish Supercup: 2015

=== Individual ===
- 2013–14 ACB season: All-Young Players Team
- 2014–15 ACB season: All-Young Players Team
- 2015–16 EuroLeague: EuroLeague Rising Star

=== Spanish junior national team ===
- 2011 FIBA Europe Under-18 Championship: All-Tournament Team
- 2011 FIBA Europe Under-18 Championship: MVP

== Personal life ==
Abrines' father, Gabriel, played basketball professionally in Spain for five teams from 1989 to 1999. Abrines was born in the Spanish city of Palma de Mallorca where his father retired from basketball.
