= Ulysse Adjagba =

French basketball player (born 1993)

No. 6 – Aix Maurienne
- Position: Point guard
- League: LNB Pro B

Personal information
- Born: 27 March 1993 (age 33) Versailles, France
- Listed height: 6 ft 1 in (1.85 m)

Career information
- Playing career: 2012–present

Career history
- 2012–2013: Élan Chalon
- 2013–present: Aix Maurienne

Ulysse Adjagba (born 27 March 1993) is a French professional basketball player who currently plays for Aix Maurienne of the LNB Pro B. He is a 1.85 m (6 ft 1 in) tall point guard.

== Professional career ==
Adjagba has played with the French Pro A League club Chalon/Saône.
