= Stefan Popovski-Turanjanin =

Serbian basketball player

Personal information
- Born: 7 March 1993 (age 33) Skopje, Macedonia
- Listed height: 2.04 m (6 ft 8 in)
- Listed weight: 99 kg (218 lb)

Career information
- NBA draft: 2015: undrafted
- Playing career: 2011–2016
- Position: Small forward / power forward

Career history
- 2011–2012: Oostende
- 2012–2013: MZT Skopje
- 2014: Rabotnički- PAOK BC
- 2015–2016: Jagodina
- 2016: CAB Madeira
Medals
Representing Serbia
Men's basketball
U18 European Championship
| Silver medal – second place | 2011 Poland | U18 National Team |
U16 European Championship
| Bronze medal – third place | 2009 Lithuania | U16 National Team |
Men's 3x3 basketball
Youth Olympic Games
| Gold medal – first place | 2010 Singapore | Team competition |

Stefan Popovski-Turanjanin (Serbian Cyrillic: Стефан Поповски-Турањанин; born 7 March 1993) is a Serbian affiliate manager and former professional basketball player.
