= Joonas Cavén =

Finnish basketball player (born 1993)

Personal information
- Born: 9 January 1993 (age 33) Nokia, Finland
- Listed height: 6 ft 11 in (2.11 m)
- Listed weight: 212 lb (96 kg)

Career information
- NBA draft: 2015: undrafted
- Playing career: 2011–2019
- Position: Forward

Career history
- 2009–2011: Tampereen Pyrintö
- 2009–2011: →Tampereen junior team
- 2011–2014: Joventut Badalona
- 2011–2014: →CB Prat
- 2014–2015: Reno Bighorns
- 2015: Delaware 87ers
- 2015–2019: Tampereen Pyrintö

Joonas Ilmari Cavén (born 9 January 1993) is a Finnish former professional basketball player who lastly played for the Tampereen Pyrintö of Finland's Korisliiga. He has previously played in Spain for Joventut Badalona of the Liga ACB, but mostly for the club's development team CB Prat of the Spanish third-tier league LEB Plata. He also competes for the Finnish national team as he made his debut in August 2013 against Russia.

== Professional career ==
Cavén played for the Tampereen Pyrintö junior team in 2009–10 before he joined the senior team in 2010–11 where he made his debut on 12 January 2011. He also spent time with the junior team in 2010–11 as well.

In 2011, Cavén signed with Joventut Badalona and immediately joined their junior team CB Prat of the LEB Plata. After two seasons playing for Prat, Cavén made his Liga ACB debut on 20 October 2013 and went on to play a further four games for Joventut in 2013–14.

In April 2014, Cavén declared for the 2014 NBA draft but later withdrew his entry before the deadline.

On 1 November 2014 Cavén was selected by the Reno Bighorns with the 10th overall pick in the 2014 NBA D-League draft. On 21 January 2015 he was traded to the Delaware 87ers in exchange for the player rights for Melvin Johnson III and the returning player rights to Elijah Pittman.

On 30 September 2015 Cavén returned to Tampereen Pyrintö.

After the 2018–19 season he retired from basketball

== Career statistics ==
=== National team ===
Team	Tournament	Pos.	GP	PPG	RPG	APG
Finland	EuroBasket 2015	16th	4	0.8	0.8	0.0
