= Mislav Brzoja =

Croatian basketball player

No. 10 – Cedevita Junior
- Position: Small forward
- League: Croatian League; ABA League Second Division

Personal information
- Born: January 9, 1994 (age 32) Zagreb, Croatia
- Listed height: 1.98 m (6 ft 6 in)
- Listed weight: 98 kg (216 lb)

Career information
- High school: Traders Point Christian Church (Whitestown, Indiana)
- College: Villanova (2012–2013); Evansville (2014–2016)
- NBA draft: 2016: undrafted
- Playing career: 2010–present

Career history
- 2010–2011: Dubrava
- 2016–2019: Zadar
- 2019–2020: Gorica
- 2020: Dubrava
- 2020–2021: Sutjeska
- 2021–2022: Atomerőmű SE
- 2022–2023: Široki
- 2023–2024: Dinamo Zagreb
- 2024–present: Cedevita Junior
Medals
Men's basketball
Representing Croatia
FIBA Europe Under-18 Championship
Gold medal – first place	2012 Lithuania/Latvia	U-18 Team
FIBA Europe Under-16 Championship
Gold medal – first place	2010 Montenegro	U-16 Team

Mislav Brzoja (born January 1, 1994) is a Croatian professional basketball player currently playing for Cedevita Junior of the Croatian League and ABA League Second Division. Standing at 1.98 m, he plays at the small forward position.

== Playing career ==
In 2016, Brzoja signed for Zadar.

After spending three seasons in Zadar, in September 2019, he signed with Gorica.

In September 2020, Brzoja returned to Dubrava.

In December 2020, Brzoja signed with Sutjeska of the Montenegrin League and ABA League Second Division. On September 12, 2021, Brzoja signed with Atomerőmű SE of the Nemzeti Bajnokság I/A.

In July 2022, Brzoja signed a one-year contract with Široki of the Basketball Championship of Bosnia and Herzegovina and ABA League Second Division.
