= 2010 FIBA Under-17 World Championship =

- Official logo of the FIBA Under-17 World Championship 2010

Tournament details
- Host country: Germany
- City: Hamburg
- Dates: 2–11 July
- Teams: 12 (from 5 confederations)
- Venue: 1 (in 1 host city)

Final positions
- Champions: United States (1st title)

Tournament statistics
- MVP: (United States) Bradley Beal
- Top scorer: (China) Guo (22.4)
- Top rebounds: (Egypt) Hamdy (12.1)
- Top assists: (United States) Cook (7.4)
- PPG (Team): United States (107.5)
- RPG (Team): United States (50.8)
- APG (Team): United States (24.8)

Official website
- archive.fiba.com

The 2010 FIBA Under-17 World Championship (German: FIBA U17-Weltmeisterschaft 2010) was the inaugural edition of the FIBA Under-17 World Championship, the biennial international men's youth basketball championship contested by the U17 national teams of the member associations of FIBA. It was hosted by Hamburg, Germany from 2 to 11 July 2010.

The United States won their first title in the tournament against Poland.

== Qualification ==
- 2009 FIBA Africa Under-16 Championship
  1. Egypt
- 2009 FIBA Asia Under-16 Championship
  1. China
  2. South Korea
- 2009 FIBA Americas Under-16 Championship
  1. United States
  2. Argentina
  3. Canada
- 2009 FIBA Europe Under-16 Championship
  1. Spain
  2. Lithuania
  3. Serbia
  4. Poland
- 2009 FIBA Oceania Under-16 Championship
  1. Australia
- Host country
  1. Germany

== Groups ==
Group A	Group B
Argentina; China; Egypt; Lithuania; Serbia; United States	Australia; Canada; Germany; South Korea; Poland; Spain

== Preliminary round ==
Team advanced to Quarterfinals
Team competed in Placement matches

Times given below are in CEST (UTC+2).

=== Group A ===
Team	Pld	W	L	PF	PA	PD	Pts	Tiebreaker
United States	5	5	0	541	348	+193	10	
Lithuania	5	4	1	396	393	+3	9	
China	5	3	2	398	405	−7	8	
Serbia	5	2	3	378	383	−5	7	
Argentina	5	1	4	359	363	−4	6	
Egypt	5	0	5	349	529	−180	5	

2 July 2010
09:00

Report

Lithuania	85–72	China
Scoring by quarter: 17–24, 23–13, 26–15, 19–20
Pts: Mockevicius 20; Rebs: Lekunas, Narkevicius each 6 Asts: Paliukenas 8		Pts: Guo, Zhai each 20; Rebs: Zhai 6 Asts: Luo 3

Sporthalle Hamburg, Hamburg

2 July 2010
11:15

Report

Serbia	99–67	Egypt
Scoring by quarter: 21–15, 21–15, 34–21, 23–16
Pts: Mitrovic 18; Rebs: Jankovic, Bezbradica each 10; Asts: Cvetkovic, Cvorovic, Mitrovic, Bezbradica each 3		Pts: Moustafa 22; Rebs: Hamdy 10; Asts: Shousha, Abbas each 2

Sporthalle Hamburg, Hamburg

2 July 2010
13:30

Report

Argentina	70–82	United States
Scoring by quarter: 17–24, 19–17, 20–22, 14–19
Pts: Garino 14; Rebs: Garino 6 Asts: Tuero, Garino each 3		Pts: Gilchrist 22; Rebs: Gilchrist 15; Asts: Teague 5

Sporthalle Hamburg, Hamburg

3 July 2010
10:00

Report

Egypt	69–98	Argentina
Scoring by quarter: 18–22, 14–25, 20–26, 17–25
Pts: Hamdy 18; Rebs: Hamdy 9 Asts: Shousha, Gamal each 3		Pts: Massarelli 21; Rebs: Massone 7 Asts: Massarelli 5

Sporthalle Hamburg, Hamburg

3 July 2010
12:15

Report

United States	102–66	Lithuania
Scoring by quarter: 32–13, 24–18, 33–12, 13–23
Pts: Beal, McAdoo each 16; Rebs: McAdoo 7 Asts: Cook 8		Pts: Narkevicius 14; Rebs: Kymantas 8 Asts: Paliukenas, Mockevicius each 3

Sporthalle Hamburg, Hamburg

3 July 2010
21:15

Report

China	74–71	Serbia
Scoring by quarter: 15–24, 21–12, 18–15, 20–20
Pts: Guo 25; Rebs: Wang 7 Asts: Guo 8		Pts: Miljenovic 22; Rebs: Jankovic 6 Asts: Miljenovic 5

Sporthalle Hamburg, Hamburg

5 July 2010
14:30

Report

Argentina	56–62	Serbia
Scoring by quarter: 10–12, 13–16, 18–18, 15–16
Pts: Bortolin 13; Rebs: Garino 10; Asts: Gallizzi 4		Pts: Miljenovic 14; Rebs: Bezbradica 9 Asts: Miljenovic 2

Sporthalle Hamburg, Hamburg

5 July 2010
16:45

Report

United States	113–73	China
Scoring by quarter: 29–14, 18–22, 30–23, 36–14
Pts: McAdoo 26; Rebs: Parker 6 Asts: Cook 13		Pts: Zhu 17; Rebs: Zhu 7 Asts: Guo 6

Sporthalle Hamburg, Hamburg

5 July 2010
21:15

Report

Lithuania	97–77	Egypt
Scoring by quarter: 26–20, 15–16, 25–26, 31–15
Pts: Mockevicius 21; Rebs: Kymantas 17; Asts: Lekys, Lekunas each 4		Pts: Moustafa, Abbas each 15; Rebs: Hamdy 9 Asts: Abbas 5

Sporthalle Hamburg, Hamburg

6 July 2010
12:15

Report

China	76–64	Argentina
Scoring by quarter: 16–17, 13–21, 19–18, 28–8
Pts: Guo 26; Rebs: Zhai 11; Asts: Guo 7		Pts: Zanzotera 26; Rebs: Garino 6 Asts: Marchisio 5

Sporthalle Hamburg, Hamburg

6 July 2010
16:45

Report

Egypt	64–132	United States
Scoring by quarter: 16–38, 6–38, 12–27, 30–29
Pts: Hamdy 18; Rebs: Moftan 9 Asts: Karoura 3		Pts: Beal, Gilchrist 18; Rebs: Drummond 9 Asts: Cook 10

Sporthalle Hamburg, Hamburg

6 July 2010
21:15

Report

Serbia	71–74	Lithuania
Scoring by quarter: 24–17, 18–14, 12–21, 17–22
Pts: Mitrovic 19; Rebs: Bezbradica 7 Asts: Radonjic, Miljenovic each 3		Pts: Mockevicius 18; Rebs: Kymantas 9 Asts: Semaska 5

Sporthalle Hamburg, Hamburg

7 July 2010
12:15

Report

Egypt	72–103	China
Scoring by quarter: 18–30, 15–29, 19–26, 20–18
Pts: Abbas 22; Rebs: Hamdy 16; Asts: Abbas 3		Pts: Guo 30; Rebs: Wang 10; Asts: Guo 8

Sporthalle Hamburg, Hamburg

7 July 2010
14:30

Report

United States	112–75	Serbia
Scoring by quarter: 21–24, 31–9, 26–22, 34–20
Pts: Beal 20; Rebs: McAdoo 13; Asts: Cook 5		Pts: Bezbradica 21; Rebs: Jankovic, Bezbradica each 8 Asts: Miljenovic 3

Sporthalle Hamburg, Hamburg

7 July 2010
16:45

Report

Lithuania	74–71	Argentina
Scoring by quarter: 23–27, 15–12, 18–16, 18–16
Pts: Mockevicius 16; Rebs: Mockevicius 9 Asts: Semaska 7		Pts: Massarelli 23; Rebs: Garino, Bortolin each 6 Asts: Chaves, Garino each 3

Sporthalle Hamburg, Hamburg

=== Group B ===
Team	Pld	W	L	PF	PA	PD	Pts	Tiebreaker
Poland	5	5	0	414	322	+92	10	
Canada	5	3	2	388	358	+30	8	1–1 +7
Germany	5	3	2	312	341	−29	8	1–1 −3
Australia	5	3	2	336	341	−5	8	1–1 −4
Spain	5	1	4	370	380	−10	6	
South Korea	5	0	5	366	444	−78	5	

2 July 2010
15:45

Report

Australia	54–71	Poland
Scoring by quarter: 20–16, 5–22, 23–17, 6–16
Pts: Dumovic 20; Rebs: Gilmore, Chircu each 5 Asts: Hill, Carlin each 3		Pts: Ponitka 21; Rebs: Karnowski 13; Asts: Grochowski 7

Sporthalle Hamburg, Hamburg

2 July 2010
19:00

Report

Germany	69–68	Canada
Scoring by quarter: 17–14, 17–19, 21–18, 14–17
Pts: Bekteshi 27; Rebs: Wolf 7 Asts: Bekteshi 3		Pts: Pangos 26; Rebs: Wagner 7 Asts: Pangos 4

Sporthalle Hamburg, Hamburg

2 July 2010
21:15

Report

South Korea	71–86	Spain
Scoring by quarter: 20–21, 15–17, 19–22, 17–26
Pts: Moon 18; Rebs: Lee 9 Asts: Choi 4		Pts: Díez 21; Rebs: Díez 13; Asts: Pampano 7

Sporthalle Hamburg, Hamburg

3 July 2010
14:30

Report

Canada	76–68	Australia
Scoring by quarter: 24–13, 10–17, 17–27, 25–11
Pts: Bennett 16; Rebs: Pierre 10; Asts: Pangos, Chan each 3		Pts: Norton 15; Rebs: Odigie 6 Asts: Hill, Constable, Odigie each 3

Sporthalle Hamburg, Hamburg

3 July 2010
16:45

Report

Poland	101–83	South Korea
Scoring by quarter: 33–24, 25–18, 22–24, 21–17
Pts: Ponitka 26; Rebs: Karnowski 17; Asts: Grochowski 9		Pts: Lee 26; Rebs: Jang 8 Asts: Lee 4

Sporthalle Hamburg, Hamburg

3 July 2010
19:00

Report

Spain	64–74	Germany
Scoring by quarter: 11–9, 19–18, 15–22, 19–25
Pts: Díez 13; Rebs: Díez 10; Asts: Fernández 3		Pts: Radosavljevic 18; Rebs: Hartmann 9 Asts: Peric, Bekteshi each 3

Sporthalle Hamburg, Hamburg

5 July 2010
10:00

Report

Spain	72–79	Canada
Scoring by quarter: 18–18, 12–23, 25–13, 17–25
Pts: Sanz 15; Rebs: Medori, Díez each 8 Asts: Fernández 4		Pts: Pangos, Notice each 13; Rebs: Webster-Chan 7 Asts: Pangos 5

Sporthalle Hamburg, Hamburg

5 July 2010
12:15

Report

South Korea	70–84	Australia
Scoring by quarter: 20–25, 19–7, 12–25, 19–27
Pts: Han 16; Rebs: Moon 6 Asts: Moon 5		Pts: Dumovic 25; Rebs: Dumovic 10; Asts: Hill, Odigie, Gilmore, Chircu each 2

Sporthalle Hamburg, Hamburg

5 July 2010
19:00

Report

Germany	33–79	Poland
Scoring by quarter: 6–20, 8–10, 8–22, 11–27
Pts: Krumbeck, Radosavljevic each 8 Rebs: Hartmann, Bekteshi each 6 Asts: Radosavljevic 2		Pts: Karnowski 24; Rebs: Gielo, Karnowski each 9 Asts: Grochowski 4

Sporthalle Hamburg, Hamburg

6 July 2010
10:00

Report

Canada	95–74	South Korea
Scoring by quarter: 27–18, 25–10, 18–20, 25–26
Pts: Lomomba 20; Rebs: Pierre 10; Asts: Pangos 7		Pts: Moon 27; Rebs: Jang 7 Asts: Choi 4

Sporthalle Hamburg, Hamburg

6 July 2010
14:30

Report

Poland	88–82 (OT)	Spain
Scoring by quarter: 26–28, 9–10, 19–25, 23–14, Overtime: 11–5
Pts: Ponitka 26; Rebs: Karnowski 12; Asts: Grochowski 4		Pts: Fernández 24; Rebs: Fernández 8 Asts: Fernández 8

Sporthalle Hamburg, Hamburg

6 July 2010
19:00

Report

Australia	62–58	Germany
Scoring by quarter: 17–11, 18–9, 13–16, 14–22
Pts: Norton 13; Rebs: Dumovic 8 Asts: Hill, Norton each 3		Pts: Krumbeck 17; Rebs: Wolf 9 Asts: Hartmann 4

Sporthalle Hamburg, Hamburg

7 July 2010
10:00

Report

Poland	75–70	Canada
Scoring by quarter: 18–23, 19–7, 18–20, 20–20
Pts: Michałak, Karnowski each 14; Rebs: Karnowski 10; Asts: Ponitka 5		Pts: Pangos 22; Rebs: Pierre 13; Asts: Pangos 6

Sporthalle Hamburg, Hamburg

7 July 2010
19:00

Report

Germany	78–68	South Korea
Scoring by quarter: 17–29, 14–11, 19–8, 28–20
Pts: Bekteshi 24; Rebs: Wolf 9 Asts: Bekteshi, Wolf each 5		Pts: Kim 26; Rebs: Lee 7 Asts: Han 5

Sporthalle Hamburg, Hamburg

7 July 2010
21:15

Report

Spain	66–68	Australia
Scoring by quarter: 10–10, 24–15, 18–22, 14–21
Pts: Ramón 19; Rebs: Sanz, Suárez each 6 Asts: Fernández 7		Pts: Norton 13; Rebs: Dumovic 11; Asts: Hill 5

Sporthalle Hamburg, Hamburg

== 9th–12th playoffs ==
Semi-finals
9 July – Hamburg
Argentina	90
South Korea	77
9 July – Hamburg
Spain	87
Egypt	62

Ninth place
10 July – Hamburg
Argentina	66
Spain	56
Eleventh place
10 July – Hamburg
South Korea	87
Egypt	88

=== 9th–12th semifinals ===
9 July 2010
10:00

Report

Argentina	90–77	South Korea
Scoring by quarter: 20–14, 19–18, 24–22, 27–23
Pts: Marchisio 18; Rebs: Bortolin 10; Asts: Bortolin 7		Pts: Han 28; Rebs: Han, Han, Lee each 4 Asts: Choi 4

Sporthalle Hamburg, Hamburg

9 July 2010
12:15

Report

Spain	87–62	Egypt
Scoring by quarter: 19–10, 14–21, 35–19, 19–12
Pts: Sanz, Fernández each 17; Rebs: Medori 11; Asts: Cerqueira 4		Pts: Hamdy 23; Rebs: Hamdy 16; Asts: Shousha 2

Sporthalle Hamburg, Hamburg

=== 11th place playoff ===
10 July 2010
10:00

Report

South Korea	87–88	Egypt
Scoring by quarter: 27–22, 22–14, 16–27, 22–25
Pts: Lee 22; Rebs: Lee 8 Asts: Lee 8		Pts: Hamdy 21; Rebs: Hamdy 17; Asts: Moustafa 3

Sporthalle Hamburg, Hamburg

=== 9th place playoff ===
10 July 2010
12:15

Report

Argentina	66–56	Spain
Scoring by quarter: 16–13, 16–21, 15–18, 19–4
Pts: Massone, Herrera each 12; Rebs: Garino, Bortolin each 6 Asts: Goldenberg, Massone each 2		Pts: Díez 13; Rebs: Suárez 6 Asts: Costa 5

Sporthalle Hamburg, Hamburg

== Knockout round ==
Quarter-finals
9 July – Hamburg
United States	105
Australia	70
9 July – Hamburg
Canada	102
China	96
9 July – Hamburg
Lithuania	73
Germany	61
9 July – Hamburg
Poland	100
Serbia	70

Semi-finals
10 July – Hamburg
United States	103
Canada	83
10 July – Hamburg
Lithuania	65
Poland	75

Final
11 July – Hamburg
United States	111
Poland	80
Third place
11 July – Hamburg
Canada	83
Lithuania	81

Semi-finals
10 July – Hamburg
China	66
Australia	68
10 July – Hamburg
Germany	51
Serbia	67

Fifth place
11 July – Hamburg
Australia	64
Serbia	74
Seventh place
11 July – Hamburg
China	65
Germany	64

=== Quarterfinals ===
9 July 2010
14:30

Report

Canada	102–96	China
Scoring by quarter: 28–20, 22–22, 31–28, 21–26
Pts: Bennett 29; Rebs: Bennett 14; Asts: Hanlan 6		Pts: Guo 28; Rebs: Wang 13; Asts: Guo 7

Sporthalle Hamburg, Hamburg

9 July 2010
16:45

Report

United States	105–70	Australia
Scoring by quarter: 28–16, 24–20, 33–13, 20–21
Pts: Beal 25; Rebs: Drummond 12; Asts: Teague 8		Pts: Dyson 16; Rebs: Odigie 8 Asts: Hill 4

Sporthalle Hamburg, Hamburg

9 July 2010
19:00

Report

Lithuania	73–61	Germany
Scoring by quarter: 21–18, 9–15, 20–9, 23–19
Pts: Lekunas 14; Rebs: Kymantas 12; Asts: Semaska 4		Pts: Wolf 14; Rebs: Wolf 14; Asts: Hartmann, Bekteshi each 2

Sporthalle Hamburg, Hamburg

9 July 2010
21:15

Report

Poland	100–70	Serbia
Scoring by quarter: 23–17, 30–13, 25–17, 22–23
Pts: Gielo 24; Rebs: Karnowski 8 Asts: Michałak 8		Pts: Miljenovic 12; Rebs: Miljenovic 7 Asts: Jankovic 3

Sporthalle Hamburg, Hamburg

=== 5th–8th semifinals ===
10 July 2010
14:30

Report

China	66–68	Australia
Scoring by quarter: 14–15, 15–18, 19–18, 18–17
Pts: Guo 24; Rebs: Zhai 7 Asts: Wang 5		Pts: Carlin 16; Rebs: Odigie 7 Asts: Hill 3

Sporthalle Hamburg, Hamburg

10 July 2010
16:45

Report

Germany	51–67	Serbia
Scoring by quarter: 13–19, 17–13, 12–15, 9–20
Pts: Bekteshi, Radosavljevic each 11; Rebs: Radosavljevic 6 Asts: Hartmann, Krumbeck each 4		Pts: Miljenovic 31; Rebs: Mitrovic 10; Asts: Miljenovic 3

Sporthalle Hamburg, Hamburg

=== Semifinals ===
10 July 2010
19:00

Report

Canada	83–103	United States
Scoring by quarter: 17–30, 25–18, 23–27, 18–28
Pts: Wiggins 20; Rebs: Pierre 15; Asts: Notice 6		Pts: Gilchrist 30; Rebs: Gilchrist 15; Asts: Wroten 6

Sporthalle Hamburg, Hamburg

10 July 2010
21:15

Report

Lithuania	65–75	Poland
Scoring by quarter: 21–12, 17–27, 14–21, 13–15
Pts: Mockevicius 24; Rebs: Kymantas 12; Asts: Semaska 6		Pts: Ponitka 22; Rebs: Karnowski 13; Asts: Karnowski 5

Sporthalle Hamburg, Hamburg

=== 7th place playoff ===
11 July 2010
09:00

Report

China	65–64	Germany
Scoring by quarter: 12–14, 7–20, 22–12, 24–18
Pts: Guo 23; Rebs: Guo 8 Asts: Guo, Yan each 3		Pts: Bekteshi 23; Rebs: Bekteshi 6 Asts: Hartmann 6

Sporthalle Hamburg, Hamburg

=== 5th place playoff ===
11 July 2010
11:15

Report

Australia	64–74	Serbia
Scoring by quarter: 18–21, 16–19, 18–16, 12–18
Pts: Carlin 27; Rebs: Odigie 5 Asts: Hill 5		Pts: Mitrovic 18; Rebs: Mitrovic 9 Asts: Mitrovic, Miljenovic each 5

Sporthalle Hamburg, Hamburg

=== Bronze medal game ===
11 July 2010
13:30

Report

Canada	83–81	Lithuania
Scoring by quarter: 24–28, 16–15, 19–18, 24–20
Pts: Hanlan 15; Rebs: Pierre 9 Asts: Pangos 5		Pts: Paliukenas 18; Rebs: Kymantas 14; Asts: Paliukenas 5

Sporthalle Hamburg, Hamburg

=== Final ===
11 July 2010
16:00

Report

United States	111–80	Poland
Scoring by quarter: 29–24, 29–17, 20–21, 33–18
Pts: McAdoo 20; Rebs: Thomas 8 Asts: Cook 11		Pts: Gielo 21; Rebs: Karnowski 6 Asts: Szymkiewicz, Grochowski, Karnowski each 3

Sporthalle Hamburg, Hamburg

== Final standings ==
Rank	Team	Record
1st place, gold medalist(s)	United States	8–0
2nd place, silver medalist(s)	Poland	7–1
3rd place, bronze medalist(s)	Canada	5–3
4th	Lithuania	5–3
5th	Serbia	4–4
6th	Australia	4–4
7th	China	4–4
8th	Germany	3–5
9th	Argentina	3–4
10th	Spain	2–5
11th	Egypt	1–6
12th	South Korea	0–7

== Awards ==
2010 Under-17 World Championship winner

United States
First title

Most Valuable Player
(United States) Bradley Beal

All-Tournament Team

- (Canada) Kevin Pangos
- (United States) Bradley Beal
- (Poland) Mateusz Ponitka
- (United States) James Michael McAdoo
- (Poland) Przemysław Karnowski

== Statistical leaders ==
Points

Name	PPG
(China) Guo Ailun	22.4
(Poland) Mateusz Ponitka	19.0
(United States) Bradley Beal	18.3
(Egypt) Ahmed Hamdy	16.6
(South Korea) Lee Dong-yeop	16.6

Rebounds

Name	RPG
(Egypt) Ahmed Hamdy	12.1
(Poland) Przemysław Karnowski	11.0
(Lithuania) Simonas Kymantas	10.2
(Canada) Dyshawn Pierre	8.2
(United States) James Michael McAdoo	7.9

Assists

Name	APG
(United States) Quinn Cook	7.4
(United States) Marquis Teague	6.0
(China) Guo Ailun	5.5
(Poland) Grzegorz Grochowski	4.4
(United States) Anthony Wroten	4.3

Blocks

Name	BPG
(South Korea) Lee Jong-hyun	3.7
(Lithuania) Simonas Kymantas	2.1
(Poland) Przemysław Karnowski	2.0
(Germany) Bogdan Radosavljevic	2.0
(United States) James Michael McAdoo	1.9

Steals

Name	SPG
(United States) Anthony Wroten	3.5
(Argentina) Patricio Garino	2.7
(South Korea) Lee Dong-yeop	2.6
(United States) Bradley Beal	2.3
(Germany) Besnik Bekteshi	2.3
