= 2010 FIBA Under-17 World Championship squads =

Players' ages as of the tournament's opening day (2 July 2010).

== Group A ==
=== Argentina ===
Head coach: (Argentina) Enrique Tolcachier

#	Pos	Name	DoB/Age	Height	Club
4	Point Guard	Joaquín Tuero	19 July 1993 (aged 16)	1.83 metres (6.0 ft)	(Argentina) Liniers
5	Guard	Luciano Massarelli	23 July 1993 (aged 16)	1.78 metres (5.8 ft)	(Argentina) Ramos Mejía L.T.C.
6	Forward	Valentín Marchisio	22 January 1993 (aged 17)	1.88 metres (6.2 ft)	(Argentina) Juventud Sionista
7	Forward	Lucas Goldemberg	3 August 1993 (aged 16)	1.92 metres (6.3 ft)	(Argentina) Juventud Sionista
8	Shooting Guard	Tomás Zanzotera	8 February 1993 (aged 17)	1.88 metres (6.2 ft)	(Argentina) Sport Pergamino
9	Power Forward	Carlos Damián Benítez	10 May 1993 (aged 17)	1.90 metres (6.2 ft)	(Argentina) Boca Juniors
10	Point Guard	Lucas Chaves	21 January 1994 (aged 16)	1.80 metres (5.9 ft)	(Argentina) Bahiense del Norte
11	Forward	Martín Massone	3 March 1994 (aged 16)	1.87 metres (6.1 ft)	(Argentina) Deportivo San Andrés
12	Power Forward	Tayavek Gallizzi	8 February 1993 (aged 17)	2.02 metres (6.6 ft)	(Argentina) Quilmes (MdP)
13	Forward	Patricio Garino	17 May 1993 (aged 17)	1.96 metres (6.4 ft)	(Argentina) Unión (MdP)
14	Center	Matías Bortolín	11 April 1993 (aged 17)	2.05 metres (6.7 ft)	(Argentina) Atenas
15	Center	Federico Herrera	12 March 1993 (aged 17)	1.97 metres (6.5 ft)	(Argentina) Boca Juniors

=== China ===
Head coach: (China) Fan Bing

#	Pos	Name	DoB/Age	Height	Club
4	Point Guard	Bi Jiguang	11 October 1993 (aged 16)	1.83 metres (6.0 ft)	(China) Dongguan Leopards
5	Point Guard	Luo Hanchen	23 August 1994 (aged 15)	1.84 metres (6.0 ft)	(China) Dongguan Leopards
6	Shooting Guard	Wang Zirui	28 March 1993 (aged 17)	1.90 metres (6.2 ft)	(China) Zhejiang Lions
7	Combo Guard	Guo Ailun	14 November 1993 (aged 16)	1.92 metres (6.3 ft)	(China) Liaoning Dinosaurs
8	Shooting Guard	Ma Jiaxin	1 April 1993 (aged 17)	1.96 metres (6.4 ft)	(China) Bayi Rockets
9	Small Forward	Wang Pu	15 November 1993 (aged 16)	1.98 metres (6.5 ft)	(China) Guangdong Southern Tigers
10	Small Forward	Zhai Xiaochuan	24 March 1993 (aged 17)	2.03 metres (6.7 ft)	(China) Beijing Ducks
11	Power Forward	Wei Dong	20 September 1993 (aged 16)	2.02 metres (6.6 ft)	(China) Zhejiang Chouzhou
12	Power Forward	Zhu Xuhang	24 December 1993 (aged 16)	2.05 metres (6.7 ft)	(China) Guangdong Southern Tigers
13	Center	Xu Tao	9 January 1993 (aged 17)	2.10 metres (6.9 ft)	(China) Shandong Lions
14	Center	Yan Pengfei	21 June 1993 (aged 17)	2.08 metres (6.8 ft)	(China) Shanxi Zhongyu
15	Center	Wang Zhelin	20 January 1994 (aged 16)	2.13 metres (7.0 ft)	(China) Fujian Xunxing

=== Egypt ===
Head coach: (Egypt) Hesham Aboserea

#	Pos	Name	DoB/Age	Height	Club
4	Guard	Ahmed Moustafa	20 January 1993 (aged 17)	1.78 metres (5.8 ft)	(Egypt) Al-Ahly
5	Center	Hassan Attia	1 January 1994 (aged 16)	1.99 metres (6.5 ft)	(Egypt) Al-Ittihad Al-Sakndary
6	Guard	Assem Gindy	19 July 1993 (aged 16)	1.80 metres (5.9 ft)	(Egypt) El-Gezira
7	Center	Khaled Moftan	5 February 1993 (aged 17)	1.95 metres (6.4 ft)	(Egypt) Smouha Sporting Club
8	Point Guard	Youssef Shousha	9 May 1993 (aged 17)	1.88 metres (6.2 ft)	(Egypt) Alex Sporting Club
9	Guard	Omar Abbas	5 July 1994 (aged 15)	1.83 metres (6.0 ft)	(Egypt) Smouha Sporting Club
10	Guard	Mohammed Alaa	13 July 1993 (aged 16)	1.85 metres (6.1 ft)	(Egypt) Al-Ittihad Al-Sakndary
11	Guard	Ahmed Gamal	10 October 1993 (aged 16)	1.80 metres (5.9 ft)	(Egypt) Al-Ahly
12	Power Forward	Omar Yasser	5 January 1993 (aged 17)	1.87 metres (6.1 ft)	(Egypt) Al-Ittihad Al-Sakndary
13	Point Guard	Ahmed Karoura	20 February 1993 (aged 17)	1.79 metres (5.9 ft)	(Egypt) Al-Ittihad Al-Sakndary
14	Center	Ahmed Hamdy	1 August 1993 (aged 16)	1.95 metres (6.4 ft)	(Egypt) Al-Ittihad Al-Sakndary
15	Center	Mostafa Abousamra	18 May 1993 (aged 17)	1.91 metres (6.3 ft)	(Egypt) El-Gezira

=== Lithuania ===
Head coach: (Lithuania) Darius Dikcius

#	Pos	Name	DoB/Age	Height	Club
4	Guard	Paulius Semaska	14 January 1993 (aged 17)	1.79 metres (5.9 ft)	(Lithuania) Kedainiai SM
5	Forward	Aurimas Urbonas	30 March 1993 (aged 17)	1.94 metres (6.4 ft)	(Lithuania) KK Tornadas
6	Guard	Simonas Lekys	7 April 1993 (aged 17)	1.80 metres (5.9 ft)	(Lithuania) SMKA
7	Guard	Martynas Paliukėnas	14 September 1993 (aged 16)	1.78 metres (5.8 ft)	(Lithuania) SMKA
8	Guard	Mantas Mockevicius	16 January 1993 (aged 17)	1.86 metres (6.1 ft)	(Lithuania) Plunges SM
9	Forward	Aurimas Majauskas	11 May 1993 (aged 17)	1.99 metres (6.5 ft)	(Lithuania) Marijampolė SM
10	Forward	Tomas Lekunas	6 April 1993 (aged 17)	1.92 metres (6.3 ft)	(Lithuania) SMKA
11	Forward	Marijus Uzupis	5 March 1993 (aged 17)	1.97 metres (6.5 ft)	(Lithuania) Marijampolė SM
12	Forward	Rokas Narkevicius	13 November 1993 (aged 16)	1.93 metres (6.3 ft)	(Lithuania) Sabonio KM
13	Forward	Osvaldas Olisevičius	10 January 1993 (aged 17)	1.93 metres (6.3 ft)	(Lithuania) SMKA
14	Center	Simonas Kymantas	10 June 1993 (aged 17)	2.04 metres (6.7 ft)	(Lithuania) Sabonio KM
15	Center	Laimonas Chatkevicius	1 January 1993 (aged 17)	2.08 metres (6.8 ft)	(Lithuania) Klaipedos SM

=== Serbia ===
Head coach: (Serbia) Nenad Trunić

#	Pos	Name	DoB/Age	Height	Club
4	Guard	Aleksandar Cvetković	12 September 1993 (aged 16)	1.85 metres (6.1 ft)	(Serbia) KK Crvena zvezda
5	Guard	Nikola Radičević	25 April 1994 (aged 16)	1.95 metres (6.4 ft)	(Serbia) KK Partizan
6	Guard	Marko Radonjić	6 February 1993 (aged 17)	1.90 metres (6.2 ft)	(Serbia) KK Crvena zvezda
7	Guard	Nemanja Dangubić	13 April 1993 (aged 17)	1.96 metres (6.4 ft)	(Serbia) Kris Kros Pančevo
8	Forward	Nikola Čvorović	30 January 1994 (aged 16)	1.97 metres (6.5 ft)	(Serbia) KK Crvena zvezda
9	Power Forward	Luka Mitrović	21 March 1993 (aged 17)	2.04 metres (6.7 ft)	(Serbia) KK Hemofarm
10	Guard	Nenad Miljenović	8 April 1993 (aged 17)	1.94 metres (6.4 ft)	(Serbia) KK FMP
11	Forward	Nemanja Krstić	2 March 1993 (aged 17)	1.98 metres (6.5 ft)	(Serbia) KK Hemofarm
12	Power Forward	Nikola Janković	13 February 1994 (aged 16)	2.00 metres (6.56 ft)	(Serbia) KK FMP
13	Shooting Guard	Đorđe Milošević	20 June 1993 (aged 17)	1.98 metres (6.5 ft)	(Serbia) KK Hemofarm
14	Center	Nemanja Bezbradica	29 May 1993 (aged 17)	2.04 metres (6.7 ft)	(Serbia) KK FMP
15	Center	Marko Ćirović	28 June 1993 (aged 17)	2.04 metres (6.7 ft)	(Serbia) KK Hemofarm

=== United States ===
Head coach: (United States) Don Showalter

#	Pos	Name	DoB/Age	Height	Club
4	Guard	Quinn Cook	23 March 1993 (aged 17)	1.86 metres (6.1 ft)	(United States) DeMatha Catholic High School
5	Guard	Anthony Wroten	13 April 1993 (aged 17)	1.96 metres (6.4 ft)	(United States) Garfield High School
6	Guard	Marquis Teague	28 February 1993 (aged 17)	1.89 metres (6.2 ft)	(United States) Pike High School
7	Guard	Chasson Randle	5 February 1993 (aged 17)	1.89 metres (6.2 ft)	(United States) Rock Island High School
8	Guard	Bradley Beal	28 June 1993 (aged 17)	1.91 metres (6.3 ft)	(United States) Chaminade College Preparatory School
9	Forward	Michael Gilchrist	26 September 1993 (aged 16)	2.01 metres (6.6 ft)	(United States) St. Patrick High School
10	Guard/Forward	Justin Anderson	19 November 1993 (aged 16)	1.99 metres (6.5 ft)	(United States) Montrose Christian School
11	Guard/Forward	Adonis Thomas	25 March 1993 (aged 17)	1.99 metres (6.5 ft)	(United States) Melrose High School
12	Forward	James Michael McAdoo	4 January 1993 (aged 17)	2.03 metres (6.7 ft)	(United States) Norfolk Christian Schools
13	Forward	Johnny O'Bryant	1 June 1993 (aged 17)	2.09 metres (6.9 ft)	(United States) East Side High School
14	Center	Tony Parker	18 September 1993 (aged 16)	2.03 metres (6.7 ft)	(United States) Miller Grove High School
15	Center	Andre Drummond	10 August 1993 (aged 16)	2.11 metres (6.9 ft)	(United States) St. Thomas More School

== Group B ==
=== Australia ===
Head coach: (Australia) Guy Molloy

#	Pos	Name	DoB/Age	Height	Club
4	Guard	Daniel Hill	4 January 1993 (aged 17)	1.73 metres (5.7 ft)	(Australia) Sutherland Sharks
5	Guard	Cory Richardson	5 May 1993 (aged 17)	1.86 metres (6.1 ft)	(Australia) Bunbury Slammers
6	Guard	Mitch Norton	1 April 1993 (aged 17)	1.83 metres (6.0 ft)	(Australia) Townsville Crocodiles
7	Guard	Ashley Constable	7 July 1993 (aged 16)	1.85 metres (6.1 ft)	(Australia) Ballarat
8	Guard	Taylor Dyson	3 May 1993 (aged 17)	1.92 metres (6.3 ft)	(Australia) Knox Raiders
9	Center	Andrija Dumovic	18 April 1993 (aged 17)	2.05 metres (6.7 ft)	(Australia) Sydney Comets
10	Guard	Jarrod Fryar	4 February 1993 (aged 17)	1.94 metres (6.4 ft)	(Australia) Celtic Tigers Ballarat
11	Forward	Owen Odigie	18 January 1993 (aged 17)	1.95 metres (6.4 ft)	(Australia) Dandenong
12	Forward	Samuel Gilmore	26 March 1993 (aged 17)	2.00 metres (6.56 ft)	(Australia) Diamond Valley Eagles
13	Center	Tom Downie	27 April 1993 (aged 17)	2.01 metres (6.6 ft)	(Australia) Saints Basketball Club
14	Center	Phil Chricu	11 June 1993 (aged 17)	2.02 metres (6.6 ft)	(Australia) Northern Suburbs
15	Center	Daniel Carlin	19 January 1993 (aged 17)	2.02 metres (6.6 ft)	(Australia) Central Districts

=== Canada ===
Head coach: (Canada) Roy Rana

#	Pos	Name	DoB/Age	Height	Club
4	Guard	Kevin Pangos	26 January 1993 (aged 17)	1.86 metres (6.1 ft)	(Canada) Dr. John M. Denison Secondary School
5	Guard	Duane Notice	7 September 1993 (aged 16)	1.89 metres (6.2 ft)	(Canada) St. Michael's College School
6	Center	Richard Peters	8 January 1993 (aged 17)	1.86 metres (6.1 ft)	(Canada) Bewster Academy
7	Forward	Anthony Bennett	14 March 1993 (aged 17)	2.04 metres (6.7 ft)	(United States) Mountain State Academy
8	Guard	Junior Lomomba	14 January 1993 (aged 17)	1.95 metres (6.4 ft)	(United States) Memorial High School
9	Guard	Olivier Hanlan	15 February 1993 (aged 17)	1.86 metres (6.1 ft)	(Canada) Grand riviere High school
10	Guard	Dyshawn Pierre	17 November 1993 (aged 16)	1.98 metres (6.5 ft)	(Canada) Anderson Collegiate Vocational
11	Guard	Negus Webster-Chan	7 January 1993 (aged 17)	1.98 metres (6.5 ft)	(Canada) Pope John Paul II Catholic Secondary School
12	Forward	David Wagner	11 January 1993 (aged 17)	2.07 metres (6.8 ft)	(Canada) South Kamloops Secondary School
13	Guard	Joseph de Ciman	30 March 1993 (aged 17)	1.98 metres (6.5 ft)	(Canada) Dr. Martin LeBoldus High School
14	Center	Matthew Willms	6 February 1993 (aged 17)	1.86 metres (6.1 ft)	(Canada) Leamington District Secondary
15	Guard	Andrew Wiggins	23 February 1995 (aged 15)	2.01 metres (6.6 ft)	(Canada) Vaughan Secondary School

=== Germany ===
Head coach: (Germany) Frank Menz

#	Pos	Name	DoB/Age	Height	Club
4	Point Guard	Anselm Hartmann	12 February 1993 (aged 17)	1.90 metres (6.2 ft)	(Germany) TuS Jena
5	Guard	Josip Perić	4 January 1993 (aged 17)	1.82 metres (6.0 ft)	(Germany) Alba Berlin
6	Guard	Nikolaj Vukovic	28 February 1993 (aged 17)	1.87 metres (6.1 ft)	(Germany) TuS Jena
7	Guard	Besnik Bekteshi	16 January 1993 (aged 17)	1.84 metres (6.0 ft)	(Germany) BSG Ludwigsburg
8	Guard	Jakob Krumbeck	21 February 1993 (aged 17)	1.88 metres (6.2 ft)	(Germany) TuS Jena
9	Forward	Fabian Bleck	19 March 1993 (aged 17)	1.94 metres (6.4 ft)	(Germany) TUS Breckerfeld/BBV Hagen
10	Forward	Paul Albrecht	2 April 1993 (aged 17)	2.03 metres (6.7 ft)	(Germany) TuS Jena
11	Power Forward	Julius Wolf	26 January 1993 (aged 17)	2.00 metres (6.56 ft)	(Germany) SG Urspringschule
12	Guard	Malik Müller	24 January 1993 (aged 17)	1.87 metres (6.1 ft)	(Germany) SG Urspringschule
13	Center	Johannes Richter	6 December 1993 (aged 16)	2.04 metres (6.7 ft)	(Germany) Franken Hexer
14	Center	Tim Unterluggauer	31 January 1993 (aged 17)	2.06 metres (6.8 ft)	(Germany) TSV Bayer Leverkusen
15	Center	Bogdan Radosavljevic	11 July 1993 (aged 16)	2.10 metres (6.9 ft)	–

=== (South Korea) Korea ===
Head coach: (South Korea) Seung Hwan Kim

#	Pos	Name	DoB/Age	Height	Club
4	Guard	Changjin Choi	22 June 1993 (aged 17)	1.85 metres (6.1 ft)	–
5	Guard	Sanghyeok Han	30 July 1993 (aged 16)	1.78 metres (5.8 ft)	–
6	Guard	Seongmo Choi	15 April 1993 (aged 17)	1.82 metres (6.0 ft)	–
7	Power Forward	Seungwook Choi	20 August 1993 (aged 16)	1.92 metres (6.3 ft)	–
8	Guard	Ung Heo	5 August 1993 (aged 16)	1.82 metres (6.0 ft)	–
9	Forward	Seonggon Moon	9 May 1993 (aged 17)	1.92 metres (6.3 ft)	–
10	Forward	Huiwon Han	1 May 1993 (aged 17)	1.93 metres (6.3 ft)	–
11	Guard	Dong Yeop Lee	22 February 1993 (aged 17)	1.94 metres (6.4 ft)	–
12	Forward	Hyeongjun Kim	29 June 1993 (aged 17)	1.95 metres (6.4 ft)	–
13	Forward	Moonho Jang	1 June 1993 (aged 17)	1.96 metres (6.4 ft)	–
14	Center	Younggi Bang	3 April 1993 (aged 17)	2.00 metres (6.56 ft)	–
15	Center	JonGhyun Lee	5 February 1993 (aged 17)	2.03 metres (6.7 ft)	–

=== Poland ===
Head coach: (Poland) Jery Szambelan

#	Pos	Name	DoB/Age	Height	Club
4	Point Guard	Daniel Szymkiewicz	2 November 1994 (aged 15)	1.93 metres (6.3 ft)	(Poland) WKK Wrocław
5	Point Guard	Jakub Koelner	14 July 1993 (aged 16)	1.78 metres (5.8 ft)	(Poland) WKK Wrocław
6	Guard	Michał Michalak	2 November 1993 (aged 16)	1.92 metres (6.3 ft)	(Poland) Polonia 2011 Warsaw
7	Point Guard	Grzegorz Grochowski	15 March 1993 (aged 17)	1.76 metres (5.8 ft)	(Poland) ZKS Stal Stalowa Wola
8	Guard	Filip Matczak	18 September 1993 (aged 16)	1.84 metres (6.0 ft)	(Poland) Zastal Zielona Góra
9	Power Forward	Łukasz Bonarek	14 August 1993 (aged 16)	2.00 metres (6.56 ft)	(Poland) MKS Pruszkow
10	Guard	Mateusz Ponitka	29 August 1993 (aged 16)	1.95 metres (6.4 ft)	(Poland) Polonia 2011 Warsaw
11	Guard	Paweł Śpica	26 July 1993 (aged 16)	1.90 metres (6.2 ft)	(Poland) OSSM Warsaw
12	Forward	Tomasz Gielo	4 January 1993 (aged 17)	2.01 metres (6.6 ft)	(Poland) Trójka Kosz Szczecin
13	Power Forward	Dawid Kołakowski	13 January 1993 (aged 17)	2.07 metres (6.8 ft)	(Poland) MKS Zabrze
14	Power Forward	Piotr Niedźwiedzki	2 June 1993 (aged 17)	2.06 metres (6.8 ft)	(Poland) WKK Wrocław
15	Center	Przemek Karnowski	8 November 1993 (aged 16)	2.12 metres (7.0 ft)	(Poland) Katarzynka Toruń

=== Spain ===
Head coach: (Spain) Diego Ocampo

#	Pos	Name	DoB/Age	Height	Club
4	Guard	Álex Ramón	27 March 1993 (aged 17)	1.86 metres (6.1 ft)	(Spain) Saski Baskonia
5	Power Forward	Javier Medori	15 July 1993 (aged 16)	2.00 metres (6.56 ft)	(Spain) CB Estudiantes
6	Point Guard	Jorge Sanz	4 January 1993 (aged 17)	1.89 metres (6.2 ft)	(Spain) Real Madrid
7	Guard	Jaime Fernández	4 June 1993 (aged 17)	1.84 metres (6.0 ft)	(Spain) CB Estudiantes
8	Point Guard	Lluís Costa	27 February 1993 (aged 17)	1.86 metres (6.1 ft)	(Spain) FC Barcelona
9	Forward	Fernando Cerqueira	19 January 1993 (aged 17)	1.91 metres (6.3 ft)	(Spain) Joventut Badalona
10	Guard	Ricardo Pampano	30 April 1993 (aged 17)	1.89 metres (6.2 ft)	(Spain) CB Sevilla
11	Guard	Lluís Conde	17 February 1993 (aged 17)	1.94 metres (6.4 ft)	(Spain) CB Málaga
12	Forward	Mamadou Diop	14 February 1993 (aged 17)	2.01 metres (6.6 ft)	(Spain) Saski Baskonia
13	Power Forward	Alejandro Suárez	27 September 1993 (aged 16)	2.04 metres (6.7 ft)	(Spain) Joventut Badalona
14	Center	Julen Olaizola	4 March 1993 (aged 17)	2.08 metres (6.8 ft)	(Spain) Real Madrid
15	Power Forward	Dani Díez	7 April 1993 (aged 17)	2.03 metres (6.7 ft)	(Spain) Real Madrid
