= Lithuania men's national under-16 and under-17 basketball team =

Lithuania
- Joined FIBA: 1936
- FIBA zone: FIBA Europe
- National federation: LKF
- Coach: Tomas Tarasevičius

U17 World Cup
- Appearances: 6
- Medals: Bronze: 1 (2016)

U16 EuroBasket
- Appearances: 24
- Medals: Gold: 2 (2008, 2022); Silver: 5 (2009, 2010, 2015, 2016, 2025); Bronze: 1 (2007)
Home	Away

The Lithuania men's national under-16 and under-17 basketball team (Lithuanian: Lietuvos nacionalinė vaikinų jaunučių iki 16 ir jaunių iki 17 krepšinio rinktinė), is the representative for Lithuania in international basketball competitions, and it is organized and run by the Lithuanian Basketball Federation. The team represents the country at the FIBA U16 EuroBasket and at the FIBA U17 World Cup.

== Competitive record ==
=== U17 World Cup ===
Year	Pos.	Pld	W	L
(Germany) 2010	4th	8	5	3
(Lithuania) 2012	9th	7	3	4
(United Arab Emirates) 2014	Did not qualify			
(Spain) 2016	3rd	7	5	2
(Argentina) 2018	Did not qualify			
(Spain) 2022	4th	7	5	2
(Turkey) 2024	5th	7	5	2
(Turkey) 2026	7th	7	5	2
(Greece) 2028	To be determined			
Total	5/9	36	23	13

=== U16 EuroBasket ===
Year	Pos.	Pld	W	L
1971 to 1989	Part of the Soviet Union			
(Greece) 1991	Did not participate			
(Turkey) 1993	5th	7	6	1
(Portugal) 1995	Did not qualify			
(Belgium) 1997	Did not qualify			
(Slovenia) 1999	Did not qualify			
(Latvia) 2001	4th	8	5	3
(Spain) 2003	11th	12	4	8
(Greece) 2004	4th	8	4	4
(Spain) 2005	4th	8	6	2
(Spain) 2006	10th	8	5	3
(Greece) 2007	3rd	8	5	3
(Italy) 2008	1st	8	8	0
(Lithuania) 2009	2nd	9	5	4
(Montenegro) 2010	2nd	9	4	5
(Czech Republic) 2011	13th	9	7	2
(Lithuania) 2012	11th	8	4	4
(Ukraine) 2013	9th	9	5	4
(Latvia) 2014	10th	9	4	5
(Lithuania) 2015	2nd	9	6	3
(Poland) 2016	2nd	7	6	1
(Montenegro) 2017	6th	7	4	3
(Serbia) 2018	7th	7	5	2
(Italy) 2019	9th	7	5	2
(North Macedonia) 2022	1st	7	7	0
(North Macedonia) 2023	4th	7	5	2
(Greece) 2024	9th	7	5	2
(Georgia (country)) 2025	2nd	7	5	2
(Romania) 2026	4th	7	5	2
Total	24/38	192	125	67

== Past rosters of medal-winning teams ==
2007 FIBA Europe Under-16 Championship – Bronze medal (bronze)

Gilvydas Biruta, Povilas Duchovskis, Mantas Kadzevičius, Saulius Kulvietis, Osvaldas Matulionis, Deividas Nazarovas, Augustas Pečiukevičius, Arūnas Sakalauskas, Giedrius Staniulis, Jonas Valančiūnas, Ovidijus Varanauskas, Haroldas Venskus (Head coach: Marius Linartas)

2008 FIBA Europe Under-16 Championship – Gold medal (gold)

Jonas Valančiūnas, Evaldas Aniulis, Rimvydas Brencius, Vytenis Cižauskas, Rolandas Jakštas, Deividas Pukis, Dovydas Redikas, Taurantas Tamošiūnas, Edgaras Ulanovas, Tomas Urbonas, Lukas Žemaitis, Tautvydas Sabonis (Head coach: Kazys Maksvytis)

2009 FIBA Europe Under-16 Championship – Silver medal (silver)

Ignas Ramašauskas, Tauras Jogėla, Vaidas Kariniauskas, Simonas Kymantas, Simonas Lekys, Tomas Lekūnas, Paulius Leščinskas, Mantas Mockevičius, Rokas Narkevičius, Osvaldas Olisevičius, Martynas Paliukėnas, Paulius Semaška (Head coach: Darius Dikčius)

2010 FIBA Europe Under-16 Championship – Silver medal (silver)

Augustinas Jankaitis, Tomas Dimša, Tomas Galeckas, Jokūbas Gintvainis, Marius Grigonis, Timotis Kuckailis, Lukas Lekavičius, Paulius Naraškevičius, Simas Raupys, Justas Tamulis, Denis Krestinin, Artūras Makovskis (Head coach: Arūnas Visockas)

2015 FIBA Europe Under-16 Championship – Silver medal (silver)

Grantas Vasiliauskas, Aidas Bakutis, Tomas Balčiūnas, Elvis Juozaitis, Lukas Kišūnas, Vitalijus Kozys, Danielius Lavrinovičius, Ignas Sargiūnas, Lukas Uleckas, Tadas Vaičiūnas, Arnas Velička, Aidas Zitkus (Head coach: Gediminas Petrauskas)

2016 FIBA Under-17 World Championship – Bronze medal (bronze)

Grantas Vasiliauskas, Tomas Balčiūnas, Elvis Juozaitis, Lukas Kišūnas, Vitalijus Kozys, Paulius Poška, Ignas Sargiūnas, Lukas Uleckas, Tadas Vaičiūnas, Arnas Velička, Julius Daugėla, Domantas Vilys (Head coach: Gediminas Petrauskas)

2016 FIBA Europe Under-16 Championship – Silver medal (silver)

Tomas Balčiūnas, Deividas Sirvydis, Domantas Vilys, Arnas Adomavičius, Martynas Arlauskas, Dovydas Giedraitis, Rokas Jokubaitis, Nedas Kancleris, Tautvydas Kupštas, Gertautas Urbonavičius, Laurynas Vaistaras, Erikas Venskus (Head coach: Mantas Šernius)

2022 FIBA U16 European Championship – Gold medal (gold)

Dovydas Buika, Kasparas Jakučionis, Matas Buteliauskas, Steponas Žilakauskis, Kristupas Smirnov, Rokas Kreišmontas, Mantas Laurenčikas, Paulius Narvilas, Nedas Raupelis, Kevinas Šacas, Nojus Indrušaitis, Mantas Juzėnas (Head coach: Tomas Purlys)

2025 FIBA U16 EuroBasket – Silver medal (silver)

Gabrielius Buivydas, Arnas Erlickis, Kristupas Sabeckas, Lukas Lukošiūnas, Paulius Veliulis, Benas Biržinis, Jokūbas Kukta, Rojus Stankevičius, Simas Raščius, Lukas Šiškauskas, Joris Sinica, Augustas Kičas (Head coach: Tomas Tarasevičius)

== See also ==
- Lithuania men's national basketball team
- Lithuania men's national under-18 and under-19 basketball team
- Lithuania women's national under-16 basketball team
