= Kymantas =

- Lithuanian surname
- m.: Kymantas
- f.: (unmarried): Kymantaitė
- f.: (married): Kymantienė

Kymantas is a Lithuanian-language surname. Notable people with this surname include:

- Kazimiera Kymantaitė (1909–1999), Lithuanian actress and stage director
- Simonas Kymantas (born 1993), Lithuanian basketball player
- Sofija Kymantaitė-Čiurlionienė (1886–1958), Lithuanian writer, activist, literary and art critic, playwright, poet, and translator
