= Ahmed Gamal =

Ahmed Gamal may refer to:

- Ahmad Gamal (singer) (born 1988), Egyptian singer
- Ahmed Gamal El Din (born 1952), Egyptian minister of interior from 2012 to 2013
- Ahmed Gamal El-Din Moussa (born 1951), Egyptian minister of education from 2010 to 2012
- Ahmed Gamal, basketball player in 2010 FIBA Under-17 World Championship squads
- Ahmed Gamal (footballer) (born 1994), Egyptian footballer
