= Gintaras Einikis =

Lithuanian basketball player and coach

Personal information
- Born: September 30, 1969 (age 57) Kretinga, Lithuanian SSR, Soviet Union
- Listed height: 6 ft 10 in (2.08 m)
- Listed weight: 265 lb (120 kg)

Career information
- NBA draft: 1991: undrafted
- Playing career: 1987–2010
- Position: Power forward / center
- Number: 14, 41
- Coaching career: 2016–present

Career history

Playing
- 1987–1995: Žalgiris Kaunas
- 1995–1999: Avtodor Saratov
- 1999–2001: CSKA Moscow
- 2001: Śląsk Wrocław
- 2002: Near East
- 2002–2003: Žalgiris Kaunas
- 2003–2004: Prokom Trefl Sopot
- 2004: Unicaja Málaga
- 2005: Lietuvos rytas Vilnius
- 2005–2006: CEZ Basketball Nymburk
- 2009–2010: Naglis-Adakris Palanga

Coaching
- 2016: Avtodor Saratov (assistant)

Career highlights
- As player: ULEB Cup champion (2005); FIBA EuroStar (1997); FIBA EuroCup All-Star (2006); 2x Russian Super League All-Star Game (1996, 1997); 6× Lithuanian champion (1991–1995, 2003); 2× Lithuanian League MVP (1994, 1995); 2× Lithuanian League Finals MVP (1994, 1995); Russian champion (2000); Polish League champion (2004); Czech League champion (2006)
Medals
Men's basketball
Representing Lithuania
Summer Olympic Games
Bronze medal – third place	1992 Barcelona
Bronze medal – third place	1996 Atlanta
Bronze medal – third place	2000 Sydney
EuroBasket
Silver medal – second place	1995 Greece

Gintaras Einikis (born September 30, 1969) is a Lithuanian retired professional basketball player and current coach. He stands at 6 ft 10 in (208 cm), and is a former center for the senior Lithuanian national team. Einikis is the only player from the Lithuanian national team to have won all three consecutive bronze medals at the Summer Olympics, in Barcelona, Atlanta, and Sydney.

== Professional career ==
In 1987, the then 18-year-old Einikis, arrived at Žalgiris, to replace his injured teammate, Arvydas Sabonis. Einikis established himself as a strong and aggressive defender, an excellent center, and a surprisingly accurate three-point shooter. When Sabonis left Žalgiris, Einikis continued his career, as a starter.

In 1995, Einikis joined Avtodor Saratov. After dominating with Avtodor, Einikis then moved to CSKA Moscow. After 2 moderate seasons with CSKA, he moved to Śląsk Wrocław, where he averaged 9 points per game, and 4.4 rebounds per game, in 22 minutes per game of EuroLeague action. After a tumultuous first half of the season, he left Śląsk and signed with Greek side Near East to finish the season.

He then moved back to Žalgiris, where he contributed more to the team. During the last years of his career, his averages fell drastically; however, he still helped Lietuvos Rytas to win the ULEB Cup (EuroCup) championship in 2005. He retired after the 2005–06 season.

In 2009, he returned to playing professional basketball, and played for Naglis-Adakris. After the 2009–10 season, he retired for a second time.

== Career statistics ==
Legend
GP	Games played	GS	Games started	MPG	Minutes per game
FG%	Field-goal percentage	3P%	3-point field-goal percentage	FT%	Free-throw percentage
RPG	Rebounds per game	APG	Assists per game	SPG	Steals per game
BPG	Blocks per game	PPG	Points per game	PIR	Performance index rating
**Bold**	Career high

=== EuroLeague ===
Year	Team	GP	GS	MPG	FG%	3P%	FT%	RPG	APG	SPG	BPG	PPG	PIR
2001–02	Śląsk	9	7	22.1	.437	.182	**.765**	4.4	**.8**	.6	**.6**	9.0	6.9
2002–03	Žalgiris	**14**	**12**	**26.0**	.530	**.444**	.750	**4.9**	.6	**.7**	.4	**13.0**	**10.9**
2004–05	Unicaja	8	1	10.0	**.563**	.222	.500	1.4	.0	.3	.1	3.1	2.3
Career		31	20	20.4	.500	.357	.743	3.9	.5	.5	.5	9.3	7.3

== Coaching career ==
On February 10, 2016, it was announced that Einkis had become an assistant coach for Avtodor Saratov.

== Controversies ==
In 2008, Einikis participated in altercation with a night club's staff, yelling insults, threatening physical harm and refusing to leave the club. He and his friend were fined with 3,000 Litas.

After the incident, Einikis was spotted leaving the club in his car Volkswagen Touareg. Because he had lost his license a year ago after his involvement in a hit and run accident, he was fined with an additional 2,500 Litas. During the accident, it was speculated that he was on cocaine. The police discovered cocaine powder in his car.

In 2011, Einikis, heavily intoxicated, with 5.11 per mil blood-alcohol concentration, went to his friend's house and threatened to kill her by setting her house on fire. He was later arrested and charged with threats of arson and assault.

He married his longtime friend Jurgita in July 2012. Later that month, however, he, while under the influence of alcohol, physically assaulted his wife.

== Awards and achievements ==
=== Pro clubs ===
- 6× Lithuanian Champion: (1991, 1992, 1993, 1994, 1995, 2003)
  - Lithuanian SSR Champion: (1991)
  - 2× Lithuanian Champion: (1992, 1993)
  - 3× Lithuanian League (LKL) Champion: (1994, 1995, 2003)
- 2× Lithuanian League MVP: (1994, 1995)
- 2× Lithuanian League Finals MVP: (1994, 1995)
- FIBA EuroStar: (1997)
- Russian League Champion: (2000)
- Polish League Champion: (2004)
- ULEB Cup (EuroCup) Champion: (2005)
- FIBA EuroCup All-Star (FIBA EuroChallenge All-Star): (2006)
- Czech League Champion: (2006)

=== Lithuanian senior national team ===
- 1992 Summer Olympics: Bronze
- EuroBasket 1995: Silver
- 1996 Summer Olympics: Bronze
- 2000 Summer Olympics: Bronze

=== State awards ===
- Lithuania: Recipient of the Officer's Cross of the Order of the Lithuanian Grand Duke Gediminas (1995)
- Lithuania: Recipient of the Commander's Cross of the Order of the Lithuanian Grand Duke Gediminas (1996)
