= A. J. Walton =

American basketball player (born 1990)

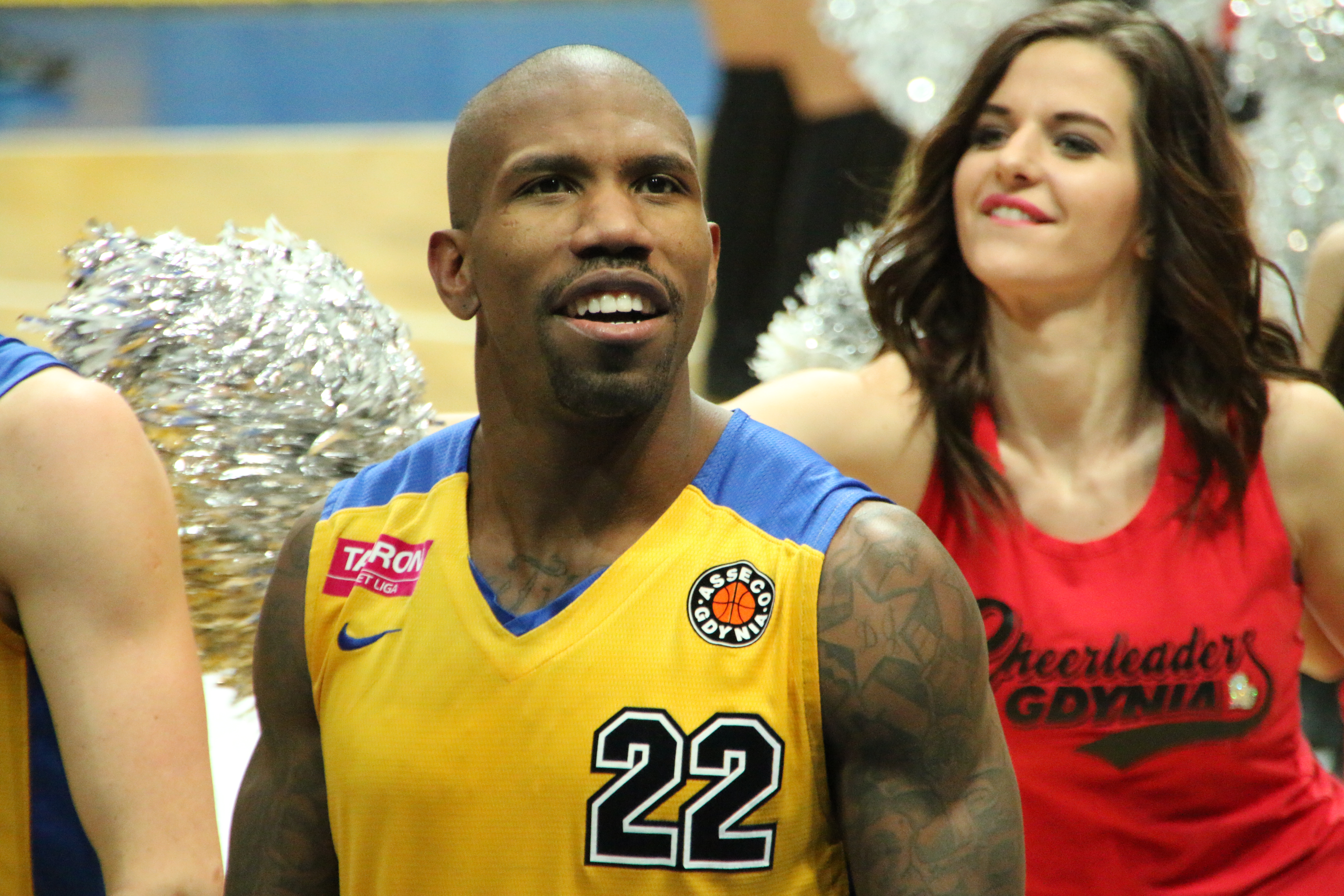

Peja
- Position: Shooting guard
- League: Kosovo Basketball League

Personal information
- Born: December 28, 1990 (age 35) Little Rock, Arkansas, U.S.
- Listed height: 6 ft 1 in (1.85 m)
- Listed weight: 185 lb (84 kg)

Career information
- High school: Hall (Little Rock, Arkansas)
- College: Baylor (2009–2013)
- NBA draft: 2013: undrafted
- Playing career: 2013–present

Career history
- 2013–2015: Asseco Gdynia
- 2015–2016: AZS Koszalin
- 2017–2018: BK Iskra Svit
- 2018–2019: BC Kolín
- 2019–2020: Astoria Bydgoszcz
- 2021–present: Peja

Career highlights
- PLK Best Defender (2014); Arkansas Mr. Basketball (2008)

Anthony Lamont "A. J." Walton (born December 28, 1990) is an American professional basketball player for Peja in the Kosovo Basketball League.

== Honors ==
- PLK Best Defender (2014)
