= PLK Best Defender =

The PLK Best Defender is an annual award that is handed out in the Polish top basketball league, the PLK. The award is given to the best defensive player in a given PLK regular season. The first Best Defender Award was handed out in the 2005–06 season, to Tomas Masiulis.

== Winners ==
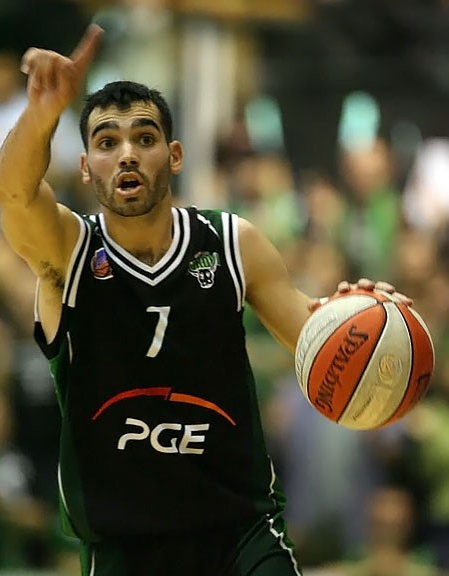
Andrés Rodríguez won the award in 2007

Season	Player	Club	Ref.
2003–04	(Lithuania) Tomas Masiulis	Prokom Trefl Sopot	
2005–06	(Lithuania) Tomas Masiulis	Prokom Trefl Sopot	
2006–07	(Puerto Rico) Andrés Rodríguez	BOT Turów Zgorzelec	
2007–08	(Senegal) Pape Sow	Prokom Trefl Sopot	
2008–09	Not awarded		
2009–10	(Poland) Łukasz Majewski	Polpharma Starogard Gdański	
2010–11	(Poland) Piotr Szczotka	Asseco Prokom Gdynia	
2011–12	(Poland) Piotr Szczotka (2)	Asseco Prokom Gdynia	
2012–13	(Poland) Krzysztof Szubarga	Anwil Włocławek	
2013–14	(United States) A.J. Walton	Asseco Gdynia	
2014–15	(Georgia (country)) Quinton Hosley	Stelmet Zielona Góra	
2015–16	(Poland) Michał Sokołowski	Rosa Radom	
2016–17	(Poland) Michał Sokołowski (2)	Rosa Radom	
2017–18	(Lithuania) Martynas Paliukėnas	King Szczecin	
2018–19	(Lithuania) Martynas Paliukėnas (2)	King Szczecin	
2019–20	Not awarded		
2020–21	(Croatia) Ivan Ramljak	Śląsk Wrocław	
2021–22	(Croatia) Ivan Ramljak (2)	Śląsk Wrocław	
2022–23	(Poland) Przemyslaw Zolnierewicz	Enea Zastal BC Zielona Góra	
2023–24	(United States) Amir Bell	Anwil Włocławek	
2024–25	(Canada) Aaron Best	Trefl Sopot	
2025–26	(United States) Quan Jackson	Tasomix Rosiek Stal Ostrów Wielkopolski	
