= Piotr Szczotka =

Polish basketball player (born 1981)

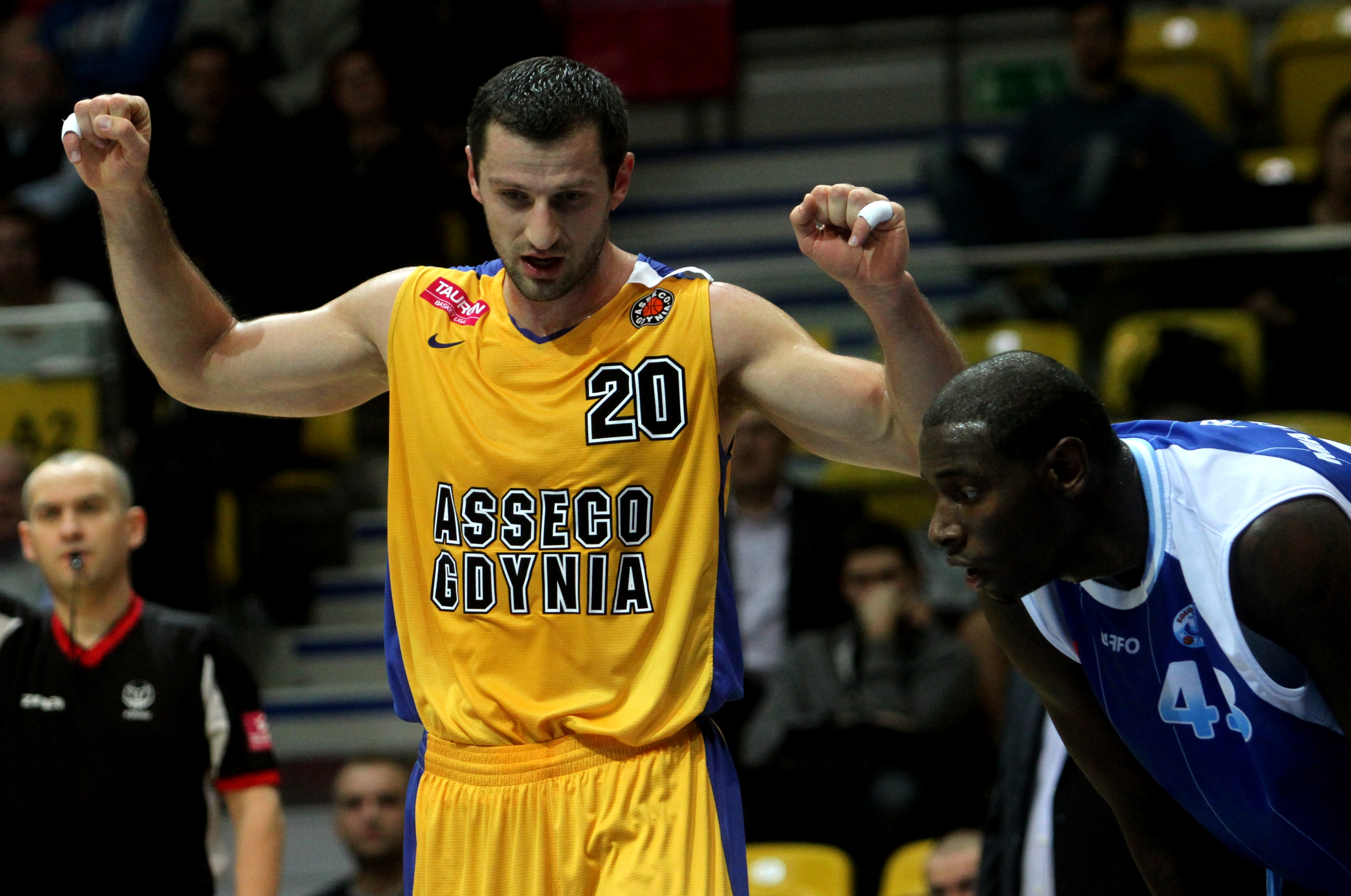

Personal information
- Born: 17 June 1981 (age 45) Jarosław, Poland
- Listed height: 196 cm (6 ft 5 in)
- Listed weight: 92 kg (203 lb)

Career information
- Playing career: 1998–2018
- Position: Small forward

Career history
- 1998–2002: Znicz Jarosław
- 2002–2004: Anwil Włocławek
- 2004: Noteć Inowrocław
- 2004–2005: Astoria Bydgoszcz
- 2005: Stal Ostrów Wielkopolski
- 2005–2006: Unia Tarnów
- 2006–2007: Znicz Jarosław
- 2007–2008: Energa Czarni Słupsk
- 2008–2018: Asseco Gdynia

Career highlights
- 2× PLK Best Defender (2011, 2012)

Piotr Szczotka (born 17 June 1981) is a Polish former professional basketball player. Szczotka usually played as shooting guard.

Since 7 years Piotr is strength conditioning coach in club Asseco Gdynia .

The older brother - Grzegorz Szczotka, also played basketball. He was the captain of the Polish national team, during the European Championships in 2011, played in Lithuania [1].

OsiągnięciaEdytuj

As of 11/04/2016, based on

], unless otherwise stated.

Team

5-time Polish champion (2003, 2009, 2010, 2011, 2012)

Polish Super Cup winner (2010)

Finalist:

Polish Cup (2004, 2009)

Polish Super Cup (2011, 2012)

Euroleague quarter-finalists (2010)

Participant of the competition:

Euroleague (2008-2013)

FIBA EuroCup Challenge (2002/03)

individual

Two times the best defender of PLK (2011, 2012)

Best in defense of PLK according to journalists (2011)

The second five PLK according to journalists (2011)

Athlete of the Year of Gdynia (2013)

Representation

Participant Eurobasket (2011)
