= BC Lietkabelis-2 =

- Nickname: Lietkabelio dubleriai
- Leagues: RKL
- Founded: 1999
- Dissolved: 2019
- History: Naglis (1999–2006; 2011–2012); Naglis-Adakris (2006–11); Palanga (2012–2014); Vilnius (2014-2015); Lietkabelis-2 (2015-2016); Lietkabelis-2/R.Sargūno SG/PKKSC (2017-2019)
- Arena: Sports Palace Aukštaitija
- Capacity: 2,000
- Location: Panevėžys, Lithuania
- Team colors: Dark red, White and Pale gold
- Head coach: (Lithuania) Gintaras Leonavičius
- Affiliation: Lietkabelis (2015–present)
- Championships: NKL Champions (2010)
- Website: kklietkabelis.lt
Home	Away

BC Lietkabelis-2 is dissolved the reserve team for BC Lietkabelis. BC "Palanga" professional basketball club was founded in 1999. In 2006 club name was changed to BC "Naglis-Adakris" because of the club supporters UAB „Adakris“ but in 2011, club name was reverted to BC "Naglis" again, changing its name to "Palanga" in 2012. For the 2014–2015 season the team moved to Vilnius and became BC Vilnius, after that one season in the capital, they moved to Panevėžys to become the reserve team of BC Lietkabelis.

== Season by season ==
Season	Tier	League	Pos.	Significant Events	Baltic League	Pos.	LKF Cup
2007–08	2	NKL	2	–	–	–	–
2008–09	2	NKL	7	Quarterfinalist	–	–	Fourth round
2009–10	2	NKL	1	Promoted	–	–	First round
2010–11	1	LKL	12	Won relegation playoffs	Challenge Cup	10	First round
2011–12	1	LKL	12	Won relegation playoffs	Challenge Cup	4	First round
2012–13	1	LKL	12	Relegated	Elite Division	T16	Fourth round
2013–14	2	NKL	12	Round of 16	–	–	–

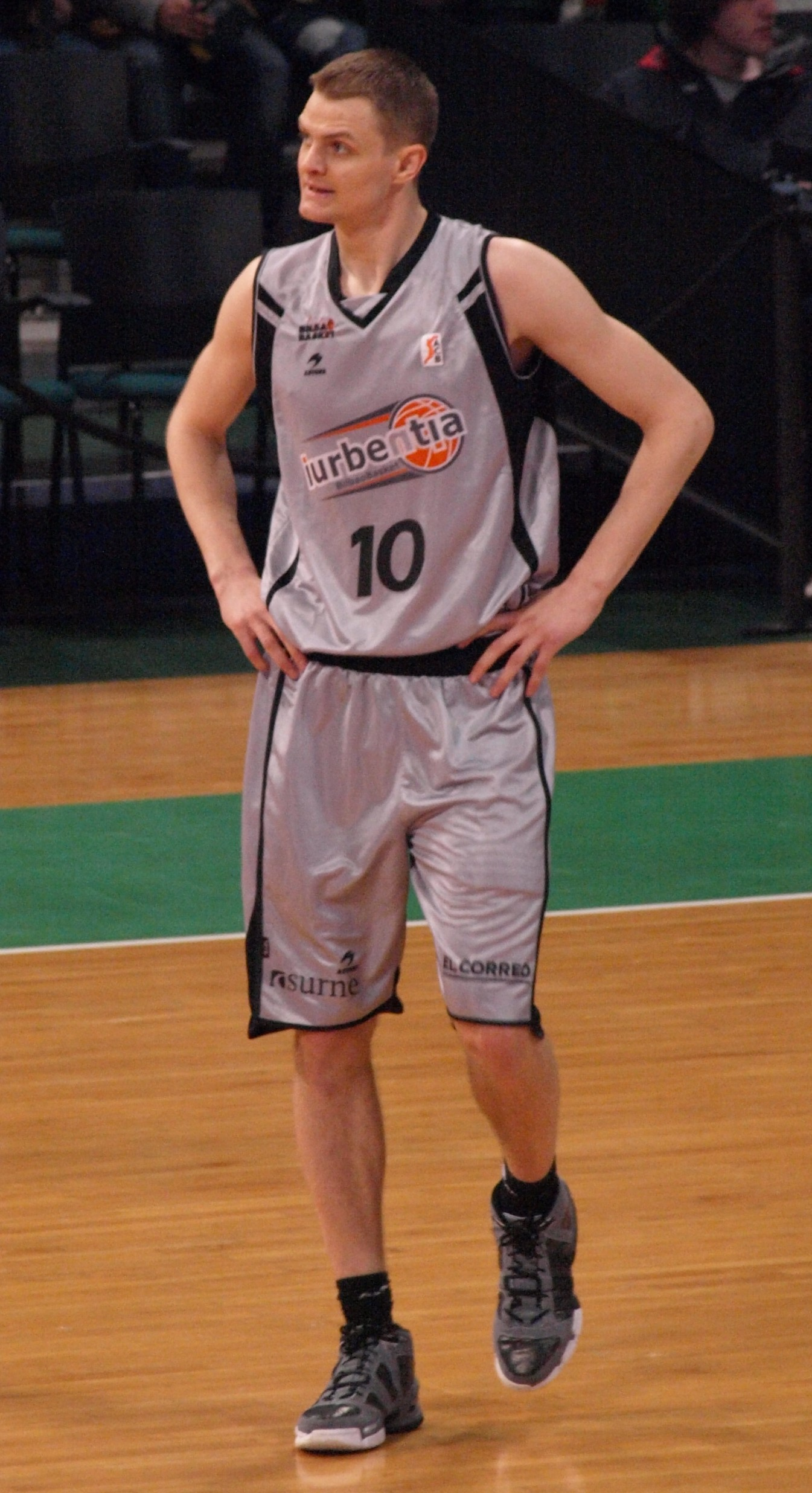
Renaldas Seibutis started his career at BC „Naglis“ in the 2002-2003 season.

== Club history ==
- In the 2007-2008 NKL season, BC "Naglis-Adakris" was only one step away from the chance to enter Lithuania basketball super league LKL as they won Silver. Lithuanian basketball legend Saulius Štombergas played the season and was the team's biggest star.
- The 2008-2009 NKL season was unsuccessful for BC "Naglis-Adakris" as they left only seventh in the league.
- The dream of LKL for BC "Naglis-Adakris" came true in the 2009-2010 NKL season when BC "Naglis-Adakris" became NKL champions and won challenge for LKL slot against BC Aisčiai (actually this match was never played because BC Aisčiai was suspended their activities that season). Gintaras Einikis played the last season of his career.
- The debut 2010-2011 LKL season was very unsuccessful for „Naglis“ as they took only 12th place from 13 places in regular season. Because of that „Naglis“ played survival match against NKL champions „Pieno Žvaigždės“ (if „Naglis“ would lost that serie, „Pieno Žvaigždės“ would get „Naglis“ slot in the Lithuania super basketball league LKL). On 26 April 2011, „Naglis“ won first transition serie match against „Pieno žvaigždės“ in Klaipėda. However, on 29 April 2011, „Naglis“ lost the second game of the transition serie in Pasvalys. The final (third game) took place in Klaipėda, which BC „Naglis“ miraculously won by only one point with result 69:68 and automatically saved their place in LKL.
- The 2011-2012 and 2012-2013 seasons did not fare better, as both times the team was at the bottom of the standings. The 2012-2013 season was in particular a disaster, as BC Palanga lost all 20 of their games. During a game against BC Juventus, the team lost 36:96, with the 36 points being an all-time low in the LKL. The team was relegated after the season.
- For the 2014–2015 season the team moved to Vilnius and became BC Vilnius, after that one season in the capital, they moved to Panevėžys to become the second team of BC Lietkabelis.

== Notable players ==
- Renaldas Seibutis (2002–2003)
- Saulius Štombergas (2007–2008)
- Mindaugas Reminas (2008–2012)
- Vytautas Buzas (2008–2010)
- Gintaras Einikis (2009–2010)
- Mantas Mockevičius (2008–2013)
