= Don Showalter (basketball) =

American basketball coach

Donald Showalter is an American basketball coach who has been serving as Director of Coach Development of the USA Basketball Youth Division since May 2016. He has guided US junior national teams to several World Championship titles.

== Career ==
Showalter grew up on a farm near Kalona, Iowa.

He earned his degree (major: physical education, minor: biology) from Wartburg College in 1974. The same year, he started coaching at Lone Tree Community School in Iowa. He then served as head coach at Central Elkader High School in Iowa from 1976 to 1984, assembling a record of 108 wins and 63 losses. In 1984, he took over head coaching duties at Mid-Prairie High School (Iowa) and left the school in 2012 with a 446-202 overall record. In 1999, Showalter coached in the McDonald's High School All-America Game and in the 2005 and 2012 Jordan Brand Classic All-Star Games.

He then worked for four years at the helm of the Iowa City High School. In his 42 seasons as high school head coach, Showalter compiled a record of 601-346, won 16 district titles and guided his teams to six state tournament appearances.

In May 2016, Showalter was named Director of Coach Development of the USA Basketball Youth Division.

=== National team ===
He guided the US Under-16 Men's National Team to gold medals at the 2009, 2011, 2013 and 2015 FIBA Americas Championships. In 2010, 2012, 2014 and 2016, he was the head coach of the gold-winning US squads at the U17 World Championships.

Showalter served as head coach of Team USA at the 1998 Nike Hoop Summit and coached the North Team at the USA Basketball Men's Youth Development Festival the same year. In 2004, he served as coordinator of the USA Basketball youth clinic in New York. Between 2001 and 2008, Showalter was chair of the USA Basketball Cadet and Youth Committee.

== Honors and titles ==
- Iowa Basketball Coaches Association Coach of the Year 1981, 1982, 1991, 1995, 1996, 2006, 2007, 2008, 2010
- National Association of Basketball Coaches Advocacy Award 2004
- National Coach of the Year (by the National High School Athletic Coaches Association) 2009
- USA Basketball Developmental Coach of the Year 2009, 2010, 2011, 2012, 2013, 2014, 2015, 2016
- Gold at U16 FIBA Americas 2009, 2011, 2013, 2015
- Gold at U17 World Championships 2010, 2012, 2014, 2016

== External links and sources ==
- http://basketball.usbasket.com/coach/Donald_Showalter/USA/High-School/26166
