= James Michael McAdoo =

American basketball player (born 1993)

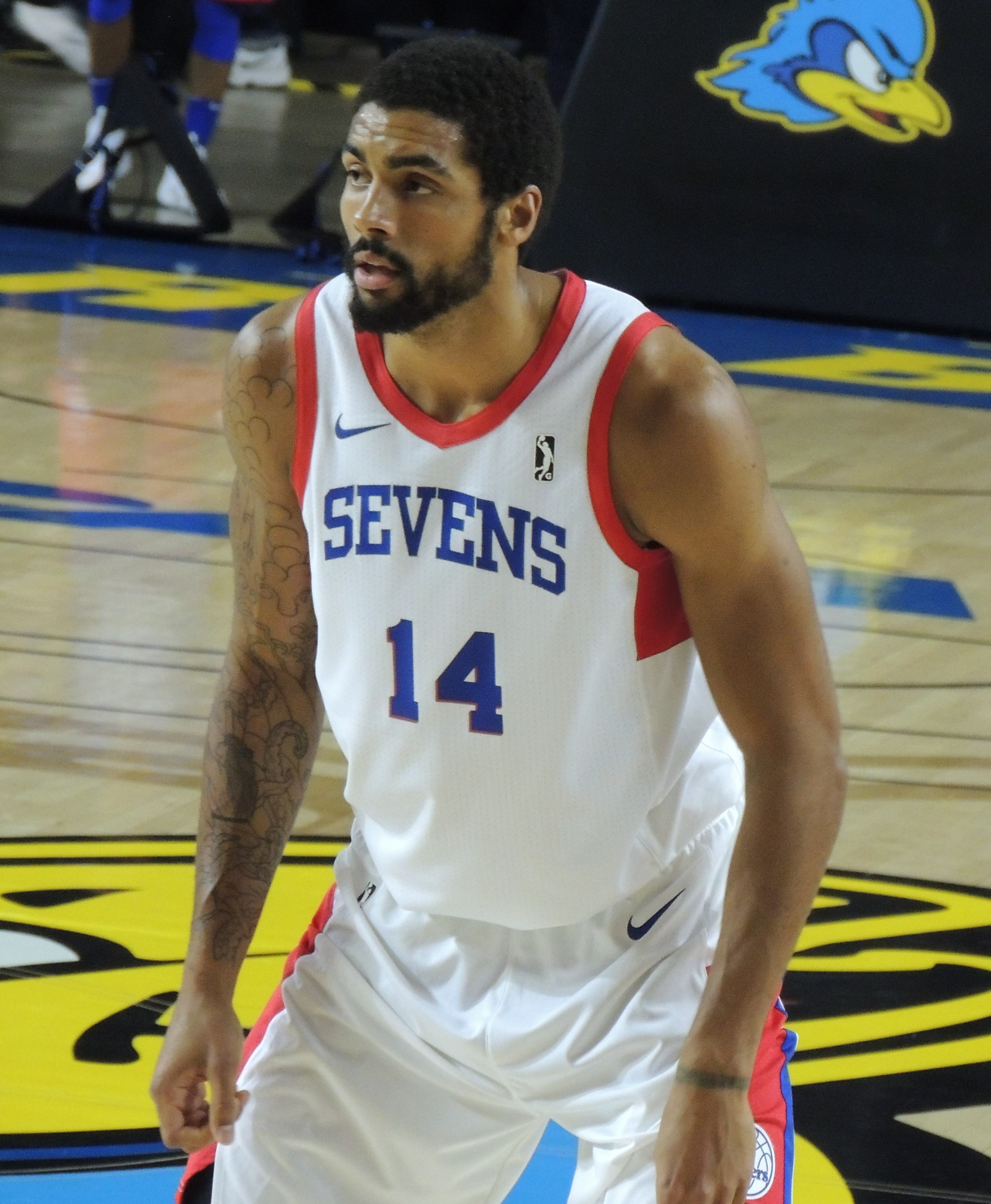
- McAdoo with the Delaware 87ers in 2017

No. 14 – Shimane Susanoo Magic
- Position: Power forward
- League: B.League

Personal information
- Born: January 4, 1993 (age 33) Norfolk, Virginia, U.S.
- Listed height: 6 ft 9 in (2.06 m)
- Listed weight: 240 lb (109 kg)

Career information
- High school: Norfolk Christian (Norfolk, Virginia)
- College: North Carolina (2011–2014)
- NBA draft: 2014: undrafted
- Playing career: 2014–present

Career history
- 2014–2015: Santa Cruz Warriors
- 2015–2017: Golden State Warriors
- 2015: →Santa Cruz Warriors
- 2017–2018: Philadelphia 76ers
- 2017–2018: →Delaware 87ers
- 2018: Agua Caliente Clippers
- 2018–2019: Auxilium Torino
- 2019–2020: Beşiktaş Sompo Japan
- 2020: Partizan
- 2020–2024: Sun Rockers Shibuya
- 2024–present: Shimane Susanoo Magic

Career highlights
- 2× NBA champion (2015, 2017); Serbian Cup winner (2020); NBA D-League champion (2015); All-NBA D-League Second Team (2015); NBA D-League All-Rookie First Team (2015); NBA D-League All-Star (2015); 2× Second-team All-ACC (2013, 2014); McDonald's All-American Game Co-MVP (2011); Third-team Parade All-American (2011); Fourth-team Parade All-American (2010); 2× Virginia Mr. Basketball (2010, 2011); USA Basketball Male Athlete of the Year (2009)
- Stats at NBA.com
- Stats at Basketball Reference
Medals
Men's basketball
Representing the United States
FIBA Americas U16 Championship
Gold medal – first place	2009 Argentina	National team
FIBA World U17 Championship
Gold medal – first place	2010 Hamburg	National team

James Michael Ray McAdoo (born January 4, 1993) is an American professional basketball player for the Shimane Susanoo Magic of the B.League in Japan. He played college basketball for the North Carolina Tar Heels, and twice earned second-team all-conference honors in the Atlantic Coast Conference (ACC). McAdoo won two NBA championships with the Golden State Warriors. He has also played in various international leagues, including the EuroCup, Turkish Basketball Super League (BSL), and ABA League.

== High school career ==
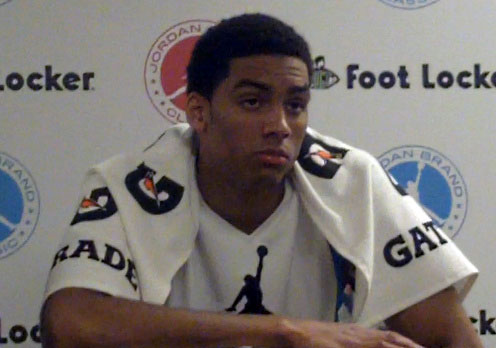
McAdoo at the 2011 Jordan Brand Classic

Born and raised in Norfolk, Virginia, McAdoo attended Norfolk Christian High School. As a junior in 2009–10, he averaged 22.5 points and 9.9 rebounds per game. As a senior in 2010–11, McAdoo averaged 21.6 points and 8.1 rebounds per game. He led Norfolk Christian to consecutive state championships and earned Gatorade Player of the Year honors in Virginia in 2010 and 2011. During his career, McAdoo earned USA Today first team and Parade All-American third team honors, as well as earning co-Most Valuable Player honors at both the McDonald's All-America Game (17 points) in Chicago and the Jordan Brand Classic (26 points, 14 rebounds) in Charlotte.

In September 2009, McAdoo committed to the University of North Carolina. After Travis and David Wear transferred from UNC, McAdoo considered graduating a year early so he could join the Tar Heels in 2010, but McAdoo ultimately decided to stay at Norfolk Christian through his senior year.

McAdoo was rated as the #4 player in the class of 2011 by Scout.com, the #6 player in the ESPNU 100, and the #8 player by Rivals.com.

== College career ==
McAdoo played three seasons at the University of North Carolina, recording career averages of 11.4 points, 5.9 rebounds, 1.0 assists, and 1.2 steals in 25.0 minutes over 108 games. As a junior in 2013–14, he earned All-ACC second team honors for the second straight year after averaging 14.2 points, 6.8 rebounds, 1.7 assists, and 1.3 steals in 34 games.

On April 3, 2014, McAdoo declared for the NBA draft, forgoing his final year of college eligibility.

== Professional career ==
=== Golden State Warriors (2014–2017) ===
After going undrafted in the 2014 NBA draft, McAdoo joined the Golden State Warriors for the 2014 NBA Summer League. On September 2, 2014, he signed with the Warriors, but was later waived by the team on October 24. On November 3, McAdoo was acquired by the Santa Cruz Warriors as an affiliate player of Golden State.

On January 19, 2015, McAdoo signed a 10-day contract with the Golden State Warriors. He made his NBA debut later that night as McAdoo came off the bench to record 11 points and five rebounds in the 122–79 victory over the Denver Nuggets. He was not retained by Golden State following the expiration of his contract on January 29, and McAdoo returned to Santa Cruz the following day. On February 2, he returned to Golden State, signing a second 10-day contract with the team. Following the expiration of his second 10-day contract, McAdoo returned to Santa Cruz where he played two games before being called up again by Golden State on February 19, signing with the team for the rest of the 2014–15 season. He was assigned multiple times to Santa Cruz to finish the season, as McAdoo earned NBA D-League All-Rookie first team and All-NBA D-League second team honors. He went on to win a D-League championship with Santa Cruz and an NBA championship with Golden State; McAdoo appeared in just over a minute of action for the Warriors during the 2015 NBA Finals against the Cleveland Cavaliers.

McAdoo retained his spot on Golden State's roster for the 2015–16 season, but missed all of January and February due to a sprained toe on his left foot. On March 21, 2016, McAdoo made his first NBA start, recording seven points and six rebounds in 17½ minutes of action in a 109–104 victory over the Minnesota Timberwolves. The Warriors returned to the NBA Finals in 2016, where they were defeated in seven games by the Cavaliers despite a 3–1 lead.

On July 13, 2016, McAdoo re-signed with the Warriors. The Warriors won 67 games in the 2016–17 season and made their way through to their third straight NBA Finals. There, the Warriors defeated the Cavaliers in five games to claim their second championship in three years. The Warriors finished the playoffs with a 16–1 record, the best postseason winning percentage in NBA history.

=== Philadelphia 76ers (2017–2018) ===
On August 30, 2017, McAdoo signed a two-way contract with the Philadelphia 76ers. Under the terms of the deal, he spent the majority of the 2017–18 season with their NBA G League affiliate, the Delaware 87ers. On January 15, 2018, McAdoo was waived by the 76ers.

=== Agua Caliente Clippers (2018) ===
On January 25, 2018, McAdoo was reacquired by the Delaware 87ers. The next day, he was traded to the Agua Caliente Clippers in exchange for a 2018 first-round draft pick and the returning player rights to Corey Hawkins.

=== Auxilium Torino (2018–2019) ===
On July 15, 2018, McAdoo signed with Italian club Auxilium Torino for 2018–19 LBA season.

=== Beşiktaş (2019–2020) ===
On August 1, 2019, McAdoo signed with Beşiktaş Sompo Japan of the Turkish Basketball Super League (BSL).

=== Partizan (2020) ===
On January 7, 2020, McAdoo signed with KK Partizan of the ABA League.

=== Sun Rockers Shibuya (2020–2024) ===
On July 2, 2020, McAdoo signed with the Sun Rockers Shibuya of the B.League.

== National team career ==
McAdoo averaged 16.8 points, 8.6 rebounds and 2.0 blocks to help Team USA win the gold medal at the 2009 FIBA Americas Under-16 Championship, played in Argentina. He was subsequently named the 2009 USA Basketball Male Athlete of the Year. In 2010, McAdoo won another gold medal after averaging 14.5 points, 7.9 rebounds and 1.9 blocks at the 2010 FIBA Under-17 World Championship, in Germany. He was named to the All-Tournament Team.

== Career statistics ==
Legend
GP	Games played	GS	Games started	MPG	Minutes per game
FG%	Field goal percentage	3P%	3-point field goal percentage	FT%	Free throw percentage
RPG	Rebounds per game	APG	Assists per game	SPG	Steals per game
BPG	Blocks per game	PPG	Points per game	**Bold**	Career high
†	Won an NBA championship

=== NBA ===
==== Regular season ====
Year	Team	GP	GS	MPG	FG%	3P%	FT%	RPG	APG	SPG	BPG	PPG
2014–15†	Golden State	15	0	**9.1**	**.545**	.000	.560	**2.5**	.1	**.3**	**.6**	**4.1**
2015–16	Golden State	41	1	6.4	.536	**.500**	.531	1.4	**.4**	.2	.2	2.9
2016–17†	Golden State	**52**	**2**	8.8	.530	.250	.500	1.8	.3	**.3**	**.6**	2.8
2017–18	Philadelphia	3	0	6.0	.286	.286	**1.000**	.7	.0	.0	.3	2.7
Career		111	3	7.9	.528	.294	.534	1.7	.3	.3	.4	3.0

==== Playoffs ====
Year	Team	GP	GS	MPG	FG%	3P%	FT%	RPG	APG	SPG	BPG	PPG
2015†	Golden State	5	0	2.0	**.667**	.000	.000	.8	.0	.0	.2	.8
2016	Golden State	8	0	**4.8**	.500	.000	.250	**1.0**	**.3**	**.4**	**.3**	.6
2017†	Golden State	**13**	0	4.3	.529	**.400**	**.667**	**1.0**	.0	.2	.2	**1.8**
Career		26	0	4.0	.542	.400	.500	1.0	.1	.2	.2	1.3

=== College ===
Year	Team	GP	GS	MPG	FG%	3P%	FT%	RPG	APG	SPG	BPG	PPG
2011–12	North Carolina	**38**	3	15.6	.434	.000	**.638**	3.9	.3	.9	.3	6.1
2012–13	North Carolina	36	**36**	30.0	.445	.000	.578	**7.3**	1.1	**1.5**	.4	**14.4**
2013–14	North Carolina	34	34	**30.1**	**.458**	.000	.537	6.8	**1.7**	1.3	**.9**	14.2
Career		108	73	25.0	.447	.000	.569	5.9	1.0	1.2	.5	11.4

== Personal life ==
McAdoo is an Evangelical Christian. He has spoken about his faith saying, "I just want people to realize I don’t play basketball for myself. No matter what adversities I face, how bad a season goes, or even how good a season goes, at the end of the day I’m playing for a bigger reason, and that’s to glorify my Lord and Savior Jesus Christ."

McAdoo's parents, Ronnie and Janet, both played basketball at Old Dominion in the late 1970s and the early 80s, and went on to play professionally in Europe, while his older sister Kelsey also played basketball at the University of North Carolina at Charlotte. Ronnie McAdoo is the second cousin of Hall of Fame basketball player Bob McAdoo, who played at North Carolina and in the NBA. McAdoo said that he calls Bob "uncle" although he does not know what their exact relationship is, and that "My dad's great-great-great grandfather and [Bob's] great-grandfather are like brothers."

"James Michael" is McAdoo's first name. He is named after his father's three best friends who died young: brothers James and Michael McPherson, and Old Dominion teammate Ray Broxton. McAdoo was known as James McAdoo during his high school career but he requested that his full first name be used before he arrived at North Carolina.

On April 2, 2014, McAdoo married Lauren Elizabeth Adkins, a UNC volleyball player.

In November of 2022, McAdoo started the Better Blue Podcast with former NBA player and Duke Blue Devil Ryan Kelly in which they recount their own college memories and the current state of the NCAA, especially their thoughts on their alma mater teams, Duke and UNC.
