= Daniel Carlin =

American health care CEO (born 1959)

- Born: September 27, 1959 (age 66)
- Education: Carnegie Mellon University (B.S.); Tufts University School of Medicine (M.D.)
- Occupation: CEO of Concierge Telemedicine company WorldClinic
- Known for: Telemedicine
- Awards: Health Professions Scholarship Program Scholarship Recipient, US Navy Research Clerkship, Clinical Presentation of A.I.D.S. Related Illnesses, Cornell University School of Medicine, Department of Tropical and Infectious Disease, Port Au Prince, Haiti
- Scientific career
- Fields: Emergency Medicine, Connected Care, Telemedicine, Infectious Disease

Daniel Carlin (born September 27, 1959) is the founder and CEO of the connected care telemedicine practice WorldClinic. He is a former U.S. Navy chief medical officer who has served as a refugee camp physician on the Afghanistan–Pakistan frontier. Carlin is board certified in Emergency Medicine and holds a consultant-staff appointment at Lahey Hospital and Medical Center in suburban Boston. He has been in practice for 29 years.

== Education ==
Dr. Carlin graduated from Carnegie Mellon University in Pittsburgh, Pennsylvania with a double degree in chemistry and philosophy in 1981. He earned his medical degree from Tufts University School of Medicine in Boston, Massachusetts in 1985. He was the medical officer on board the USS Mississippi from 1986 to 1988.

== Career ==
Carlin founded Voyager Medicine in 1996 to remotely treat seafaring crews. Operating from land, he used his beeper and cell phone to provide real-time medical consultations for sick and injured sailors. This business venture put him at the forefront of the emerging field of telemedicine healthcare.

Carlin is a recognized leader in the field of connected care and promotes the use of the latest mobile health devices to provide personal health diagnosis, treatment, and health management to patients. In 1998 he founded WorldClinic with the goal of leveraging simple technology to deliver medical care anywhere in the world. He drew on his experience as a refugee camp physician and ship's doctor to optimize telemedical care delivery to at-risk populations—people without access to, or disconnected from, modern medical care. His personal experience as a refugee camp doctor heightened his awareness of the increased vulnerability of people in remote locations, under-resourced environments, and conflict areas—particularly women and children.

Carlin achieved notoriety after he e-mailed life-saving surgical instructions to Viktor Yazykov, a solo yacht racer participating in the Around Alone yacht race. Fifty-year-old Yazykov, suffering from a dangerous elbow infection and 1,000 miles away from the coast, was able to successfully self-operate after receiving Carlin's diagnosis and guidance using e-mail. The story received worldwide attention and was featured in The New York Times, the British Broadcasting Corporation, Dateline NBC, Oprah, The Today Show, and others.

Later that year, Carlin expanded WorldClinic to include remote locations and key employees of global corporations. Since then, the company's work has been featured in Bloomberg Businessweek, Forbes, Fortune, Financial Times, and The Wall Street Journal.

Carlin is a frequent speaker to both medical and international development audiences and has lectured at institutions such as MIT Media Lab, US Naval Academy, Cleveland Clinic, and the International Economic Development Council. He also writes a regular column on health issues for Worth Magazine and is frequently quoted on the topics of healthcare, mHealth, and telemedicine. His current work focuses on leveraging telemedicine to care not only for individuals, but also to organize and deliver care to entire populations.

== See also ==
- Telemedicine
- mHealth
- eHealth
- American Telemedicine Association
- Concierge medicine
