= Julius Wolf =

German basketball player (born 1993)

No. 16 – VfL Kirchheim Knights
- Position: Power forward
- League: ProA

Personal information
- Born: 26 January 1993 (age 33) Bruchsal, Germany
- Listed height: 6 ft 7 in (2.01 m)

Career information
- NBA draft: 2015: undrafted
- Playing career: 2013–present

Career history
- 2013–2022: Science City Jena
- 2022–2023: Rasta Vechta
- 2023–2026: Nürnberg Falcons BC
- 2026–present: VfL Kirchheim Knights

Julius Wolf (born 26 January 1993) is a German professional basketball player for VfL Kirchheim Knights of the ProA.

== Early life ==
Julius Wolf was born in Bruchsal. He has played basketball since he was five years old.

== Professional career ==
Since the 2023–24 season, he has been with the Nürnberg Falcons.

== Personal ==
Julius Wolf's parents were both memorable basketball players. His father Horst Wolf was a 2.09-meter-tall center, who played in the Basketball Bundesliga and also for the national team. His mother Inken was also a Bundesliga and national player. Further, Julius’ sister Ronja plays basketball as well.
