= Matías Bortolín =

Argentine basketball player

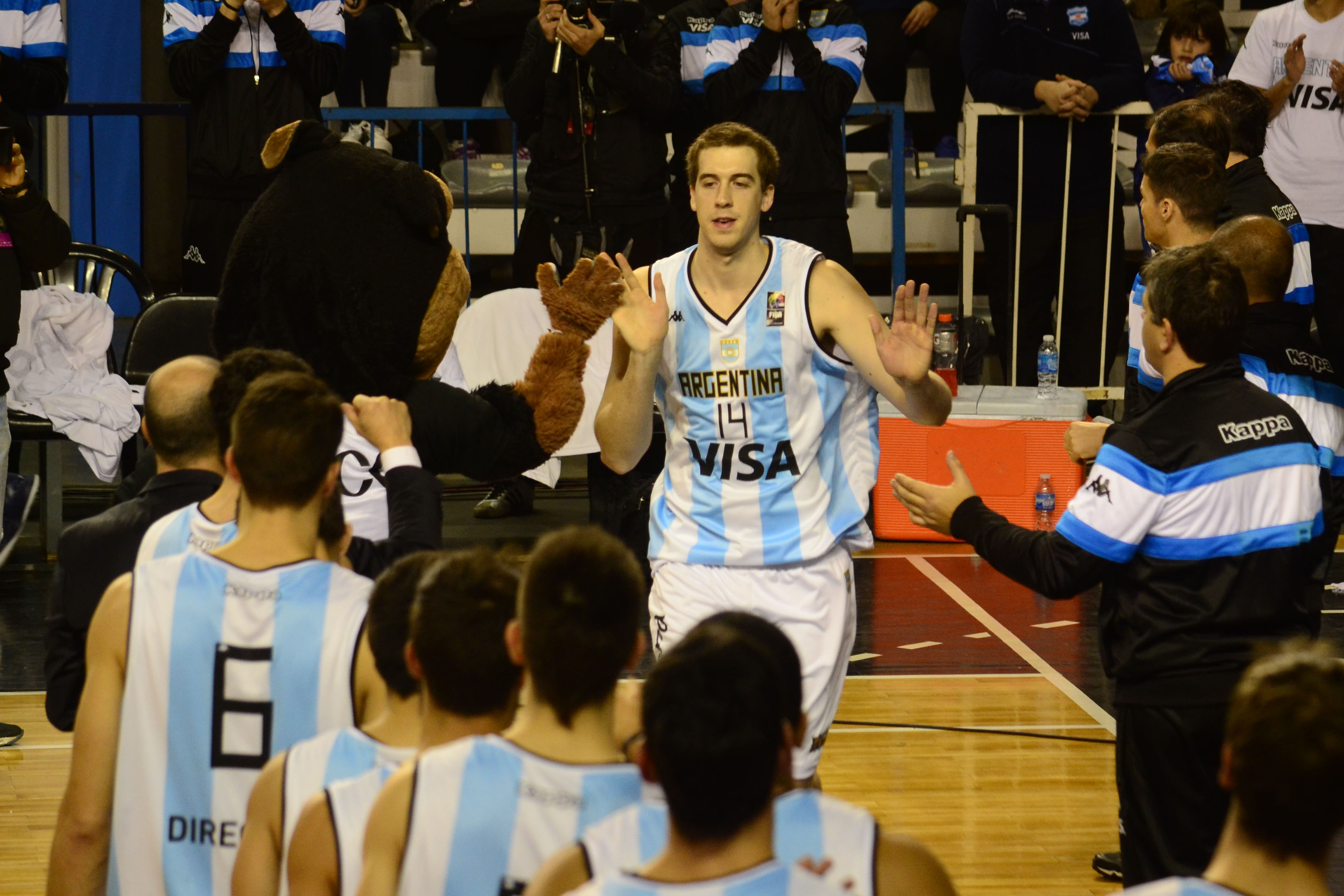
- Bortolín with Argentina, in 2015.

Free agent
- Position: Center

Personal information
- Born: April 11, 1993 (age 33) Córdoba, Argentina
- Listed height: 6 ft 9.5 in (2.07 m)
- Listed weight: 220 lb (100 kg)

Career information
- NBA draft: 2015: undrafted
- Playing career: 2010–present

Career history
- 2010: Atenas de Córdoba
- 2012–2013: Arkadia Traiskirchen Lions
- 2013: Basket Rimini Crabs
- 2013–2014: Regatas Corrientes
- 2014–2015: Atenas de Córdoba
- 2015–2016: San Martín de Corrientes
- 2016–2017: Obras Sanitarias
- 2017–2018: Argentino de Junín
- 2018–2020: Club Comunicaciones
- 2020–2021: San Giobbe
- 2021–2023: Basket Mestre
- 2023–2025: Sidigas Avellino
- 2025: Scafati Basket
- 2025–2026: JuVi Cremona Basket 1952
Medals
Men's Basketball
Representing Argentina
FIBA South American Championship
Silver medal – second place	2014 Venezuela
FIBA AmeriCup
Bronze medal – third place	2013 Venezuela

Matías Bortolín Vara (born April 11, 1993) is an Argentine professional basketball player. He plays at the center position.

== Professional career ==
In his pro career, Bortolín has played in both the 2nd-tier South American League, and the 1st-tier FIBA Americas League.

On June 6, 2025, he signed with Scafati Basket of the Lega Basket Serie A.

== National team career ==
Bortolín has been a member of the senior Argentine national basketball team. With Argentina, he has played at the 2013 FIBA AmeriCup, where he won a bronze medal, and at the 2014 FIBA World Cup.
