= Jorge Sanz (basketball) =

Spanish basketball player

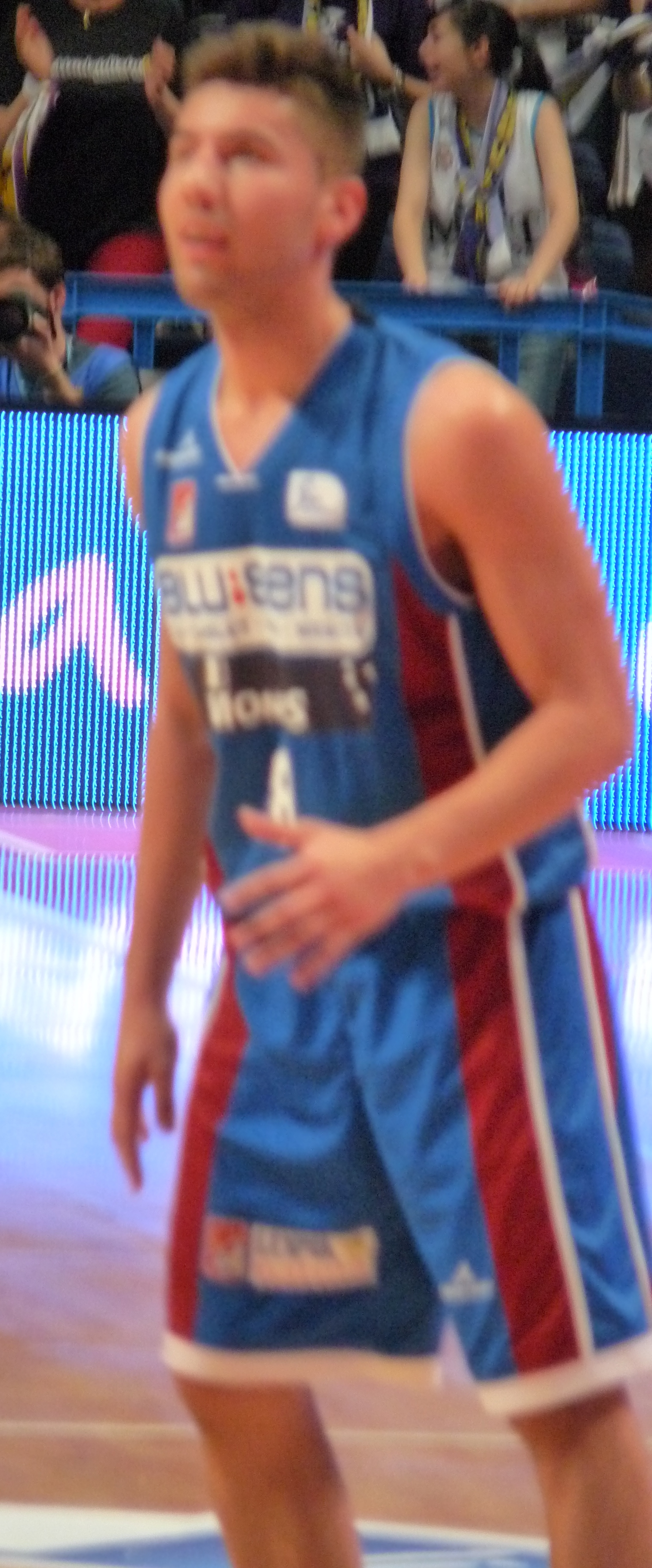

Liberbank Oviedo Baloncesto
- Position: Point guard
- League: LEB Oro

Personal information
- Born: April 1, 1993 (age 33) Madrid, Spain
- Listed height: 1.88 m (6 ft 2 in)
- Listed weight: 79 kg (174 lb)

Career information
- NBA draft: 2015: undrafted
- Playing career: 2011–present

Career history
- 2011–2013: Real Madrid
- 2011–2012: Real Madrid B
- 2012–2013: Blu:sens Monbús
- 2013–2016: Baloncesto Fuenlabrada
- 2014–2015: Peñas Huesca
- 2016–2017: Club Melilla Baloncesto
- 2017-2018: Básquet Coruña
- 2018-2019: Palencia
- 2019–present: Oviedo

Career highlights
- Spanish Cup winner (2012)
Medals
Men's basketball
Representing Spain
European U-20 Championship
Bronze medal – third place	2013 Estonia	U-20 Team
Bronze medal – third place	2012 Slovenia	U-20 Team
European U-18 Championship
Gold medal – first place	2011 Poland	U-18 Team
European U-16 Championship
Gold medal – first place	2009 Lithuania	U-16 Team

Jorge Sanz Rodríguez (born April 1, 1993), commonly known as Jorge Sanz, is a Spanish professional basketball player. He is a 1.88 m (6 ft 2 in) tall point guard who plays for Liberbank Oviedo Baloncesto.

== Career ==
Jorge Sanz joined the junior ranks of Real Madrid Baloncesto on January 9, 2007, eventually progressing through the Cadete B and A teams, and is currently a member of the Junior team playing in the Liga EBA. He made his senior team debut on April 16, 2011, for a Liga ACB match at CAI Zaragoza in an 84–86 defeat.
