= Tomasz Gielo =

Polish basketball player (born 1993)

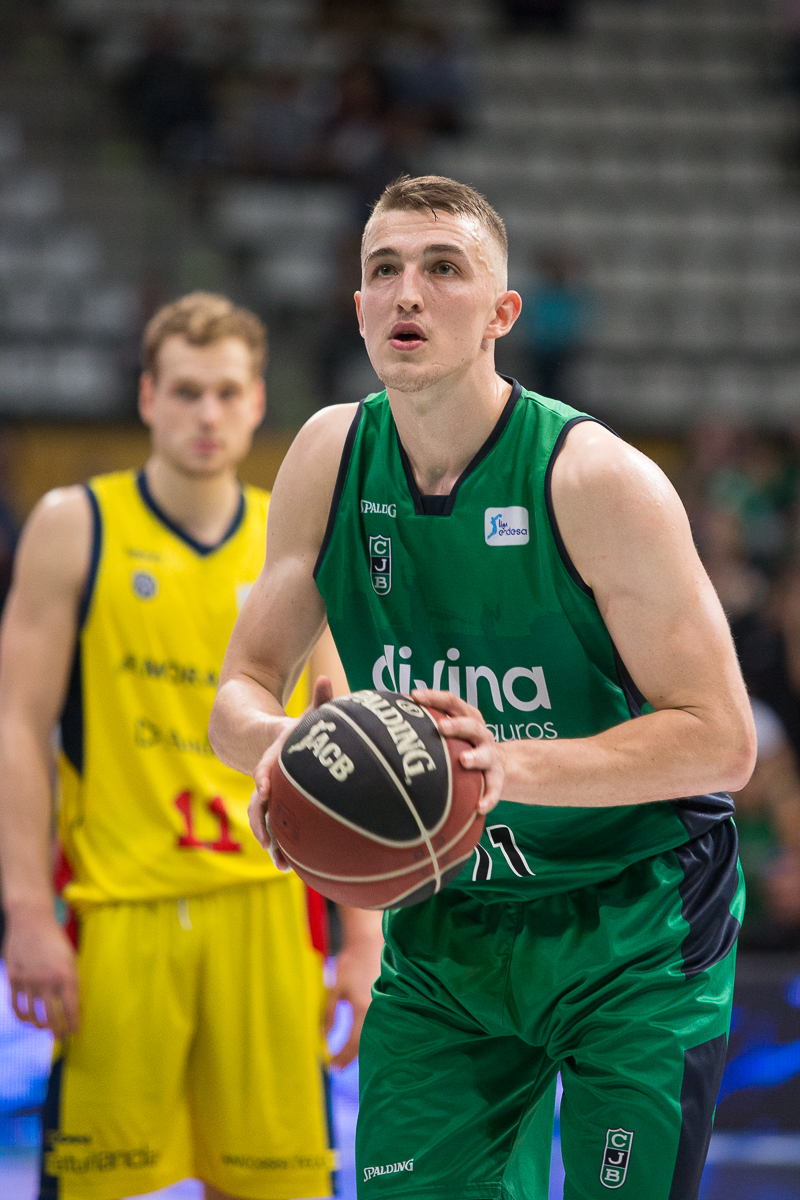

No. 12 – Wilki Morskie Szczecin
- Position: Power forward / center
- League: PLK

Personal information
- Born: 4 January 1993 (age 33) Szczecin, Poland
- Listed height: 6 ft 9 in (2.06 m)
- Listed weight: 225 lb (102 kg)

Career information
- College: Liberty (2011–2015); Ole Miss (2015–2016)
- NBA draft: 2016: undrafted
- Playing career: 2016–present

Career history
- 2016–2018: Joventut Badalona
- 2018–2020: Tenerife
- 2020–2021: MoraBanc Andorra
- 2021–2022: s.Oliver Würzburg
- 2022: Peristeri
- 2022–2023: Merkezefendi Bld. Denizli Basket
- 2023–2024: Basket Zaragoza
- 2024: Stal Ostrów Wielkopolski
- 2024–2025: Bilbao Basket
- 2025–present: Wilki Morskie Szczecin

Career highlights
- FIBA Intercontinental Cup champion (2020); FIBA Europe Cup champion (2025)
Medals
Men's basketball
Representing Poland
U17 World Championship
Silver medal – second place	2010 Germany

Tomasz Gielo (born 4 January 1993 in Szczecin) is a Polish professional basketball player for Wilki Morskie Szczecin of the Polish Basketball League (PLK). He also represents the Poland national basketball team internationally.

He started his career as a 15-year-old in the AZS Szczecin team. Later on, he continued his youth career in Zastal Zielona Góra, MKS Katarzynka Toruń, and SMS PZKosz Władysławowo.

In 2011, he went to the United States to play for the NCAA Liberty Flames of Liberty University. He was part of the 2012-2013 team who made the NCAA tournament. In 2015, he changed his college, energizing the ranks of the University of Mississippi. In his last year in the NCAA he recorded an average of 9.9 points and 4.3 rebounds.

== Professional career ==
In the summer of 2016 he trained before the NBA draft with the Los Angeles Lakers and Philadelphia 76ers. He played in the 76ers summer league.

In August 2016, he signed a contract with the Spanish club Divina Seguros Joventut. In July 2018, he parted ways with Divina Seguros Joventut.

On 15 July 2018, he signed a two-year deal with Tenerife of the Liga ACB.

On 11 October 2020, he signed a one-month deal with MoraBanc Andorra of the Liga ACB. In 2021, Gielo signed with s.Oliver Würzburg and he averaged 9.5 points and 3.1 rebounds per game.

On January 13, 2022, Gielo signed with Peristeri of the Greek Basket League. In 16 league games, he averaged 11.7 points, 3.3 rebounds, 1.1 assists and 0.8 steals, playing around 28 minutes per contest.

On August 15, 2022, he has signed with Merkezefendi Bld. Denizli Basket of the Turkish Basketball Super League (BSL).

On March 1, 2024, he signed with Stal Ostrów Wielkopolski of the Polish Basketball League (PLK).

On June 7, 2024, he signed with Bilbao Basket of the Spanish Liga ACB.

On July 20, 2025, he signed with Wilki Morskie Szczecin of the Polish Basketball League (PLK).
