= Patricio Garino =

Argentinian basketball player (born 1993)

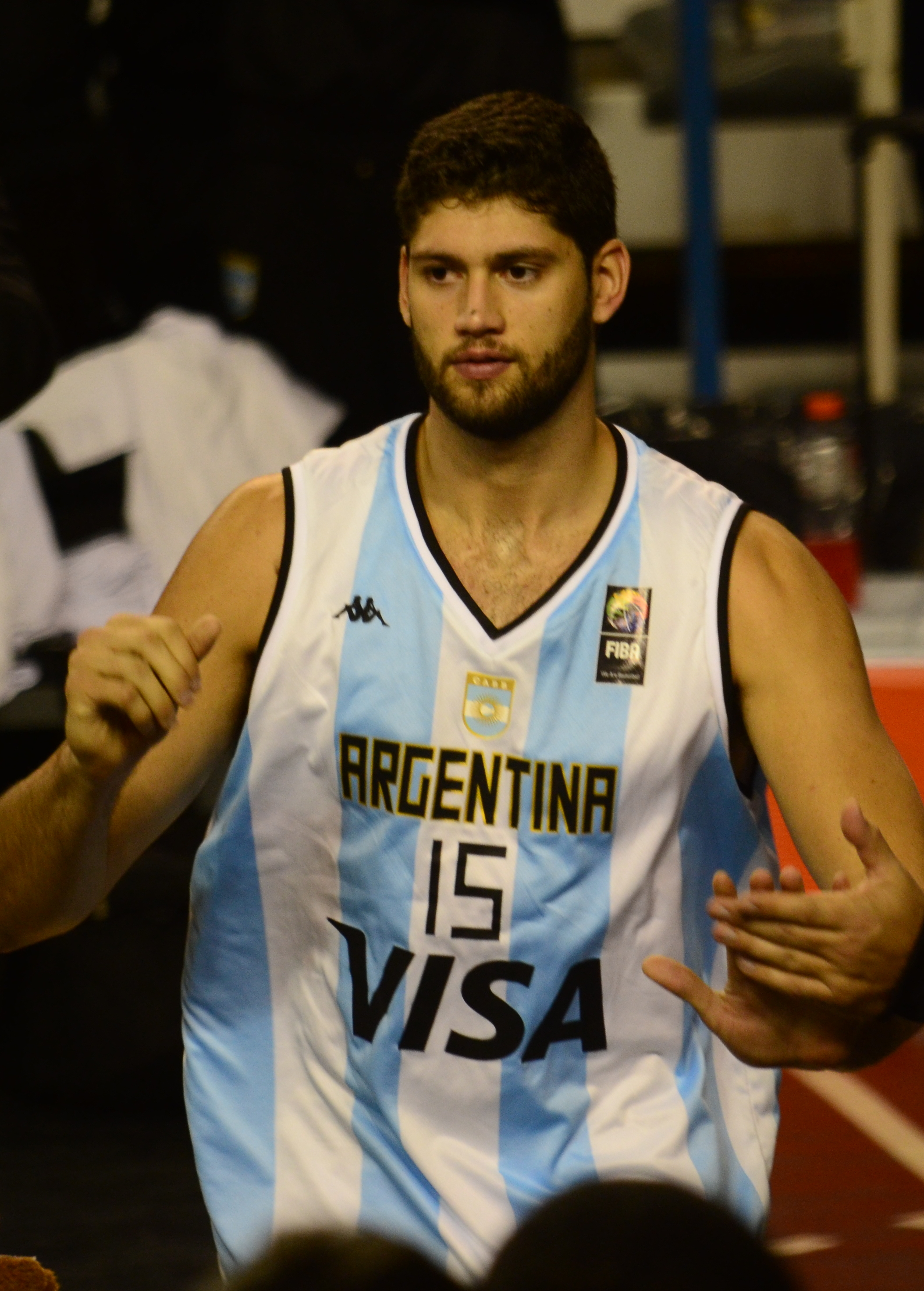
- Garino with the Argentine national team in 2015

No. 29 – Phoenix Hagen
- Position: Small forward / shooting guard
- League: Basketball Bundesliga

Personal information
- Born: May 17, 1993 (age 33) Mar del Plata, Argentina
- Listed height: 2.01 m (6 ft 7 in)
- Listed weight: 93 kg (205 lb)

Career information
- High school: Montverde Academy (Montverde, Florida)
- College: George Washington (2012–2016)
- NBA draft: 2016: undrafted
- Playing career: 2016–present

Career history
- 2016–2017: Austin Spurs
- 2017: Orlando Magic
- 2017–2020: Baskonia
- 2020–2021: Žalgiris Kaunas
- 2021–2022: Nanterre 92
- 2022–2023: Bàsquet Girona
- 2023–2024: Fuenlabrada
- 2024–2026: Estudiantes
- 2026–present: Phoenix Hagen

Career highlights
- Spain Cup champion (2026); Liga ACB champion (2020); King Mindaugas Cup winner (2021); Lithuanian Basketball League champion (2021); Second-team All-Atlantic 10 (2016); 3× Atlantic 10 All-Defensive Team (2014–2016)
- Stats at NBA.com
- Stats at Basketball Reference
Medals
Men's basketball
Representing Argentina
World Cup
Silver medal – second place	2019 China
FIBA AmeriCup
Silver medal – second place	2015 Mexico City
Silver medal – second place	2017 Argentina
Pan American Games
Gold medal – first place	2019 Lima

Patricio Nicolas Garino Gullotta "Pato" (born May 17, 1993) is an Argentine professional basketball player for Phoenix Hagen of the Basketball Bundesliga. He played college basketball for George Washington University. Garino represents the Argentine national team in international competitions. He is a 2.01 m (6 ft 7 in) tall shooting guard-small forward.

== Early career ==
Garino played basketball, football, and swimming in Mar del Plata. In 16, he moved to the United States. At the recommendation of then head coach Kevin Sutton, Garino attended Montverde Academy. Garino lead the Eagles to a 23–4 overall record and a No. 9 ranking in the final ESPNHS Powerade Fab 50 in 2011–12.

== College career ==
Following his high school coach, Garino spent four seasons at George Washington University. In his final season, he helped guide the Colonials to the 2016 NIT Championship and was named to the All-Tournament Team. He earned Atlantic 10 All-Defensive Team and the All-Conference Second Team honors after averaging 14.1 points, 4.2 rebounds, 1.5 assists, and 1.37 steals in 32.0 minutes while shooting .510 (203–398) from the field and .430 (58–135) from three-point range. He was named to the Atlantic 10 All-Defensive Team in each of his final three seasons. For his collegiate career, he averaged 12.0 points, 4.3 rebounds, 1.7 assists, and 1.71 steals in 30.1 minutes while shooting .508 (567–1,1167) from the field and .364 (102–280) from long range. He ranks third in school history on George Washington's career steals list (219) and is 11th all-time in scoring (1,536 points). Garino helped lead the team to the 2014 NCAA tournament and the championship of the 2016 NIT.

=== College statistics ===
Year	Team	GP	GS	MPG	FG%	3P%	FT%	RPG	APG	SPG	BPG	PPG
2012–13	George Washington	30	30	26.9	.427	.286	.648	3.4	2.1	2.3	0.4	8.8
2013–14	George Washington	26	14	28.7	.561	.343	.593	4.4	2.0	1.6	0.8	12.1
2014–15	George Washington	35	35	31.6	.531	.296	.735	5.3	1.5	1.7	0.8	12.4
2015–16	George Washington	38	38	32.0	.510	.430	.689	4.2	1.5	1.4	0.8	14.1

== Professional career ==
=== Austin Spurs (2016–2017) ===
After going undrafted in the 2016 NBA draft, Garino joined the Orlando Magic for the 2016 NBA Summer League. On July 29, 2016, he signed with the San Antonio Spurs, but was waived on October 22 after appearing in four preseason games. Seven days later, he was acquired by the Austin Spurs of the NBA Development League as an affiliate of San Antonio.

=== Orlando Magic (2017) ===
On April 3, 2017, Garino signed with the Orlando Magic. He made his NBA debut the following night, recording one rebound in a 122–102 loss to the Cleveland Cavaliers. On August 1, Garino was waived by the Magic. He currently holds the record for most NBA minutes played (43) without a point scored.

=== Saski Baskonia (2017–2020) ===
On September 1, 2017, Garino signed a three-year deal with Baskonia. In his first season with the club, he made his debut in the 2017–18 EuroLeague season. He made 23 appearances, averaging 4.5 points and 1.7 rebounds per game. In 2018–19 EuroLeague season, he made 18 appearances and averaged 5.6 points and 1.4 rebounds per game.

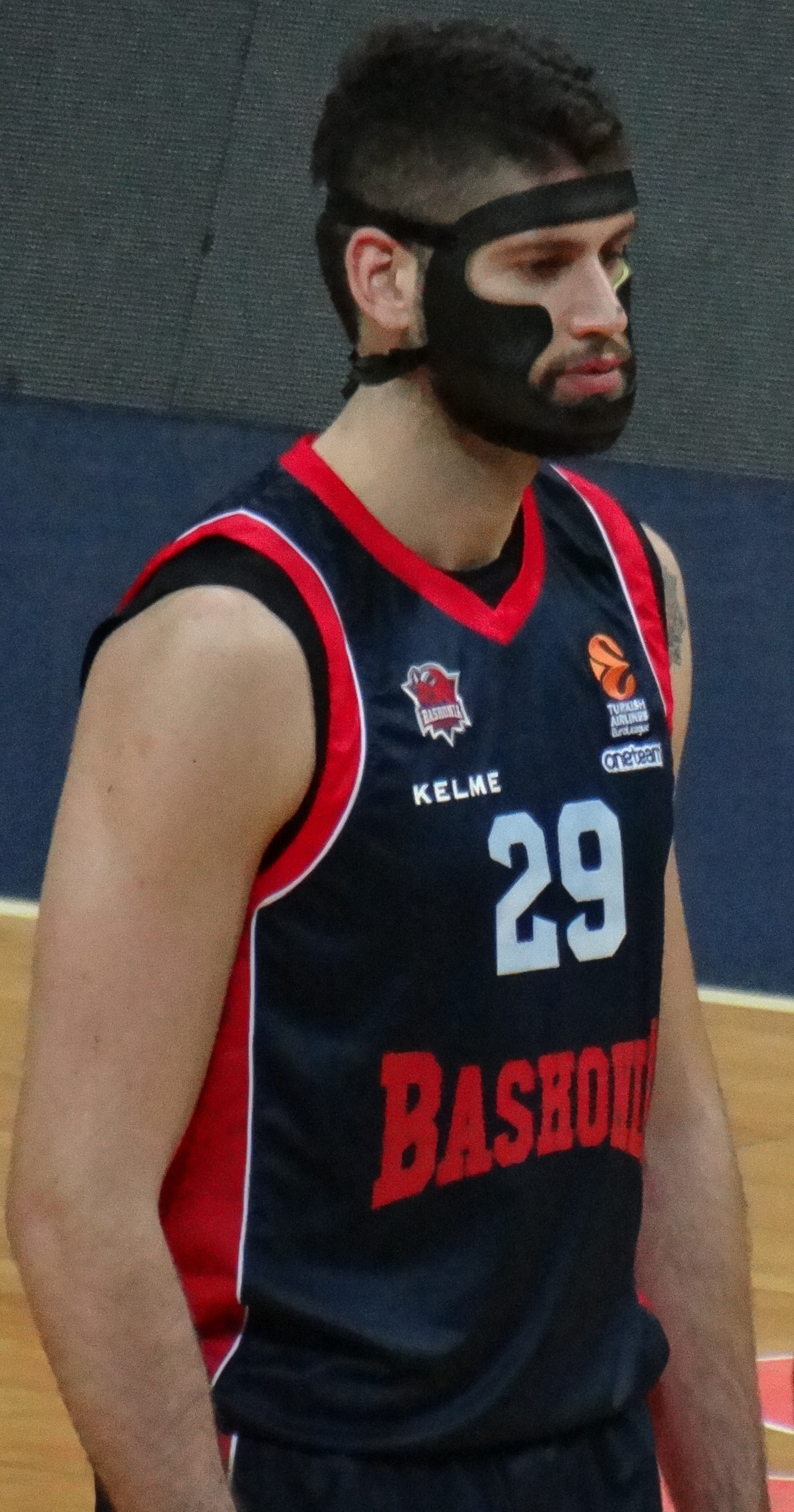
Garino with Saski Baskonia in 2018

=== Žalgiris Kaunas (2020–2021) ===
On July 22, 2020, he signed with Žalgiris Kaunas of the Lithuanian Basketball League (LKL) and the EuroLeague. In six games he averaged 3.5 points and 1.5 rebounds per game. On July 7, 2021, Garino officially parted ways with the Lithuanian club.

=== Nanterre 92 (2021–2022) ===
On August 18, 2021, Garino signed with Nanterre 92 of the LNB Pro A. In eight games, he averaged 4.0 points, 3.0 rebounds, 1.1 assists and 1.1 steals per game. On January 27, 2022, Garino parted ways with the team.

=== Basquet Girona (2022–2023) ===
On July 16, 2022, Garino signed with Bàsquet Girona of the Liga ACB. He left the team on July 6, 2023.

=== Phoenix Hagen (2026–present) ===
On August 19, 2026, he signed with Phoenix Hagen of the German Basketball Bundesliga (BBL).

== National team career ==
Garino is a member of the senior Argentina national basketball team. He won a silver medal with Argentina's senior national team at the 2015 FIBA Americas Championship. He also played at the 2016 Summer Olympics, and at the 2017 FIBA AmeriCup.

In 2019, he participated in the team that won the Pan American gold medal in Lima. He was included in the Argentine squad for the 2019 FIBA Basketball World Cup and clinched the silver medal with Argentina, which emerged as runners-up to Spain at the 2019 FIBA Basketball World Cup.

== Career statistics ==
Legend
GP	Games played	GS	Games started	MPG	Minutes per game
FG%	Field-goal percentage	3P%	3-point field-goal percentage	FT%	Free-throw percentage
RPG	Rebounds per game	APG	Assists per game	SPG	Steals per game
BPG	Blocks per game	PPG	Points per game	PIR	Performance index rating
**Bold**	Career high

=== NBA ===
==== Regular season ====
Year	Team	GP	GS	MPG	FG%	3P%	FT%	RPG	APG	SPG	BPG	PPG
2016–17	Orlando	5	0	8.6	.000	.000	.000	1.4	.0	.0	.0	.0
Career		5	0	8.6	.000	.000	.000	1.4	.0	.0	.0	.0

=== EuroLeague ===
Year	Team	GP	GS	MPG	FG%	3P%	FT%	RPG	APG	SPG	BPG	PPG	PIR
2017–18	Baskonia	**23**	7	**15.1**	.468	.273	**.839**	**1.7**	**.7**	**1.0**	**.1**	4.5	**4.5**
2018–19	Baskonia	18	**8**	14.7	**.507**	**.444**	.737	1.4	.3	.7	**.1**	**5.6**	4.2
Career		41	15	14.9	.486	.379	.800	1.6	.5	.9	.1	5.0	4.4

== Personal life ==
The son of Alicia Gullotta and Oscar Garino, he has two older sisters, Lorena and Natalia.
