= Tomas Lekūnas =

Lithuanian basketball player (born 1993)

BK Ventspils
- Position: Power forward / small forward
- League: Latvian–Estonian Basketball League

Personal information
- Born: 6 April 1993 (age 33) Biržai, Lithuania
- Listed height: 198 cm (6.50 ft)
- Listed weight: 100 kg (220 lb)

Career information
- NBA draft: 2014: undrafted
- Playing career: 2010–present

Career history
- 2010–2013: KK Akademija Vilnius
- 2013: Dzūkija
- 2013: Šilutė
- 2013–2014: Dzūkija
- 2014: Trakai
- 2014–2015: Dzūkija
- 2015–2016: Šilutė
- 2016–2017: Šiauliai
- 2017–2019: Pieno žvaigždės
- 2019–2020: Lietkabelis Panevėžys
- 2020–2021: Pieno žvaigždės
- 2021–2022: Juventus Utena
- 2022-2023: Rytas Vilnius
- 2023-2024: ZTE KK
- 2024: Pieno žvaigždės
- 2024-2025: BC Šilutė
- 2025-present: BK Ventspils

Career highlights
- Lithuanian League steals leader (2019)
Medals
Men's basketball
Representing Lithuania
FIBA Europe Under-16 Championship
Silver medal – second place	2009 Lithuania	National Team

Tomas Lekūnas (born 6 April 1993 in Lithuania) is a Lithuanian professional basketball player.

== Professional career ==
Lekūnas started his professional career in KK Akademija Vilnius in 2010.

== International career ==
He won silver medal with Lithuania U-16 national team in 2009 FIBA Europe Under-16 Championship.

In 2010, while preparing for 2010 FIBA Europe Under-20 Championship, Lekūnas alongside teammate Edgaras Zinevičius were removed from team roster, because of disciplinary violation.
