= Martynas Paliukėnas =

Lithuanian basketball player (born 1993)

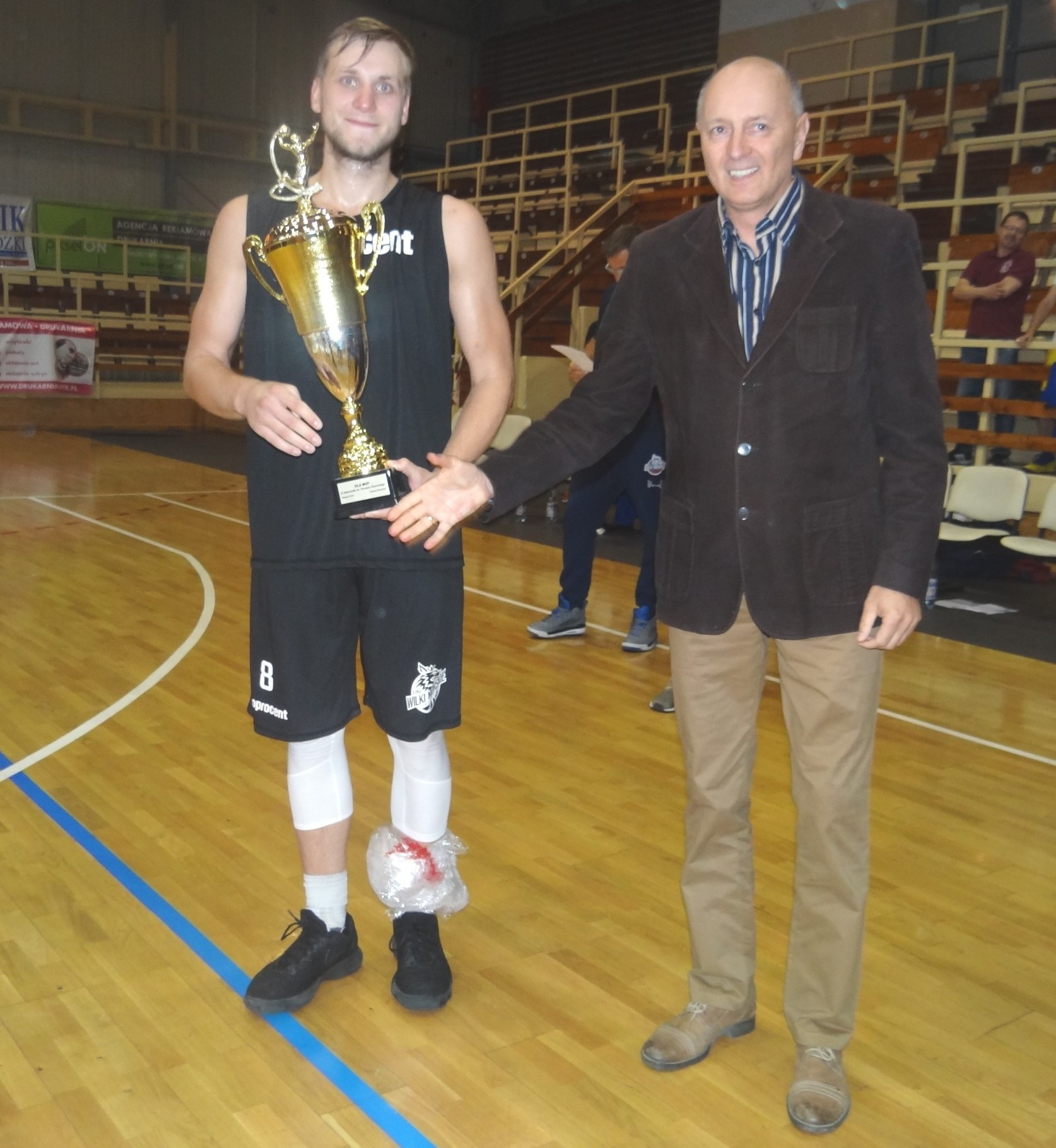
- Paliukėnas (left) in 2018

No. 77 – Rytas Vilnius
- Position: Shooting guard / small forward
- League: LKL; BCL

Personal information
- Born: 14 September 1993 (age 33) Vilnius, Lithuania
- Listed height: 1.95 m (6 ft 5 in)
- Listed weight: 94 kg (207 lb)

Career information
- NBA draft: 2015: undrafted
- Playing career: 2010–present

Career history
- 2010–2012: Akademija Vilnius
- 2012–2013: Statyba
- 2013–2015: Dzūkija
- 2015–2017: Starogard Gdański
- 2017–2019: Wilki Morskie Szczecin
- 2019–2020: Polpharma Starogard Gdański
- 2020–2021: Trefl Sopot
- 2021: Juventus Utena
- 2021–2022: CSM Oradea
- 2022–2023: Juventus Utena
- 2023–2024: M Basket Mažeikiai
- 2024–present: Rytas Vilnius

Career highlights
- FIBA Champions League champion (2026); PLK Best Defender (2018, 2019); Lithuanian League steals leader (2015); Polish League steals leader (2018)
Medals
Men's basketball
Representing Lithuania
FIBA Europe Under-16 Championship
Silver medal – second place	2009 Lithuania	National Team

Martynas Paliukėnas (born 14 September 1993) is a Lithuanian basketball player for Rytas Vilnius of the Lithuanian Basketball League (LKL) and the Basketball Champions League (BCL). Standing at 1.95 m (6 ft 5 in), he plays the shooting guard and small forward positions.

== Professional career ==
From 2017 to 2019, Paliukėnas played with King Szczecin in the Polish PLK. He won the PLK Best Defender award in both seasons.

On 9 November 2019 he signed with Polpharma Starogard Gdański of the Polska Liga Koszykówki (PLK).

On 11 February 2020 he signed with Trefl Sopot of the Polska Liga Koszykówki (PLK).

On 19 August 2021 he signed with CSM Oradea of the Liga Națională.

On 19 June 2024, Paliukėnas signed with Rytas Vilnius of the Lithuanian Basketball League (LKL) and the BCL.

== International career ==
Paliukėnas won silver medal while representing the Lithuanian U-16 National Team during the 2009 FIBA Europe Under-16 Championship.
