= Mantas Mockevičius =

Lithuanian basketball player

Personal information
- Born: 16 January 1993 (age 33) Plungė, Lithuania
- Listed height: 186 cm (6 ft 1 in)
- Listed weight: 95 kg (209 lb)

Career information
- College: Olney Central (2011)
- Playing career: 2008–2019
- Position: Point guard

Career history
- 2008–2013: BC Naglis/Palanga
- 2014: KK Vrsac Swisslion
- 2014: BC Vilnius
- 2017–2018: Stál-úlfur
- 2018–2019: Keflavík

Career highlights
- NKL champion (2010)

Mantas Mockevičius (born 16 January 1993) is a Lithuanian former basketball player who played at the point guard position. He last played for Úrvalsdeild karla club Keflavík during the 2018–19 season.

== Playing career ==
Mockevičius started his career with Palangos in 2008 in the second-tier NKL. The team was promoted in 2010 and after spending the 2010–2011 season in the LKL and the Baltic Basketball League, he joined Olney Central College in the United States during the summer. He returned to Palangos in December 2011 and finished the season with the club. During the 2012–2013 season, Mockevičius started 23 of 35 games in the LKL and the Baltic Basketball League, averaging 11.8 points and 3.2 assists.

After being without a team for the first half of the 2013–2014 season, Mockevičius joined KK Vrsac Swisslion of the Basketball League of Serbia in February 2014. He spent the first half of the 2014–2015 season with BC Vilnius in the NKL, averaging 8.7 points and 2.0 assists in 9 games.

During the summer of 2018, Mockevičius started training with Keflavík and in September the club signed him for the 2018–2019 season where he instantly became a fan favorite. Mockevičius appeared in 10 regular season games, averaging 5.2 points per game, helping Keflavík to a 4th-place finish and a home court advantage in the first round of the playoffs. On 20 March, the head coach of Keflavík, Sverrir Þór Sverrisson, stated that Mockevičius was AWOL from the team and would therefore not play for it again this season.

== National team career ==
Mockevičius played in 2013 FIBA Europe Under-20 Championship for Lithuania men's national under-20 basketball team and at the 2010 Summer Youth Olympics.
