= Simonas Kymantas =

Lithuanian basketball player (born 1993)

Personal information
- Born: June 10, 1993 (age 33) Kaunas, Lithuania
- Listed height: 212 cm (6.96 ft)
- Listed weight: 106 kg (234 lb)

Career information
- NBA draft: 2015: undrafted
- Playing career: 2009–2018
- Position: Center

Career history
- 2009–2010: Aisčiai Kaunas
- 2010–2011: KK Kaunas
- 2011–2013: Žalgiris-2 Kaunas
- 2013–2014: Juventus Utena
- 2014: →Sūduva-Mantinga Marijampolė
- 2014–2015: BC Palanga
- 2015: BC Prienai
- 2015–2017: Nevėžis Kėdainiai
- 2018: Virtus Ruvo di Puglia
Medals
Men's basketball
Representing Lithuania
FIBA Europe Under-16 Championship
Silver medal – second place	2009 Lithuania	National Team

Simonas Kymantas (born June 10, 1993) is a Lithuanian former basketball player. He plays the center position.

== International career ==
Kymantas won silver medal while representing the Lithuanian U-16 National Team during the 2009 FIBA Europe Under-16 Championship.
