= 2012 FIBA Europe Under-20 Championship =

2012 international basketball competition

2012 EuroBasket Under-20
15th FIBA Europe Under-20 Championship

Tournament details
- Host country: Slovenia
- Dates: 12 – 22 July 2012
- Teams: 16
- Venue(s): 3 (in 3 host cities)

Final positions
- Champions: Lithuania (2nd title)

Tournament statistics
- MVP: (France) Léo Westermann

Official website
- www.fibaeurope.com

The 2012 FIBA Europe Under-20 Championship was the 15th edition of the FIBA Europe Under-20 Championship. 16 teams featured in the competition, held in Slovenia from 12 to 22 July 2012. Lithuania won the title for the second time.

== Participating teams ==
- Estonia ▲ (Runners-up, 2011 FIBA Europe Under-20 Championship Division B)
- France
- Georgia ▲ (Winners, 2011 FIBA Europe Under-20 Championship Division B)
- Germany
- Greece
- Italy
- Latvia
- Lithuania
- Montenegro
- Russia
- Serbia
- Slovenia
- Spain
- Sweden
- Turkey
- Ukraine

== Group stage ==
=== First round ===
In this round, the sixteen teams were allocated in four groups of four teams each. The top three advanced to the qualifying round. The last team of each group played for the 13th–16th place in the classification games.

Team advances to the Second Round
Team will compete in the classification round

Times given below are in CEST (UTC+2).

==== Group A ====
Team	Pld	W	L	PF	PA	PD	Pts
Serbia	3	3	0	230	185	+45	6
Germany	3	2	1	170	176	−6	5
France	3	1	2	221	192	+29	4
Montenegro	3	0	3	196	264	−68	3

12 July 2012
14:00

Report

France	52–54	Germany
Scoring by quarter: 12–11, 14–17, 14–13, 12–13
Pts: Toupane 11; Rebs: Charles 8 Asts: Westermann 4		Pts: Voigtmann 10; Rebs: Heckmann, Richter 5 Asts: Wendt 3

Vitranc Hall, Kranjska Gora
Attendance: 100
Referees: Miguel Perez Perez (ESP), Marko Vučković (SLO), Ersan Kartal (TUR)

12 July 2012
20:45

Report

Serbia	91–73	Montenegro
Scoring by quarter: 27–11, 25–23, 13–22, 26–17
Pts: Bešović 18; Rebs: three players 6 Asts: Cvetković 5		Pts: Pavić 15; Rebs: Nikolić 7 Asts: Pajović 5

Vitranc Hall, Kranjska Gora
Attendance: 300
Referees: Aleksandar Milojević (MKD), Gintaras Vitkauskas (LTU), Leandro Nicolas Lezcano (ARG)

13 July 2012
18:30

Report

Germany	45–69	Serbia
Scoring by quarter: 9–18, 13–17, 10–17, 13–17
Pts: Heckmann 12; Rebs: Voigtmann 8 Asts: Wendt, Heckmann 3		Pts: Bogdanović 21; Rebs: Nastić 7 Asts: Cvetković 3

Vitranc Hall, Kranjska Gora
Attendance: 300
Referees: Luigi Lamonica (ITA), Ingus Baumanis (LAT), Nikola Perlić (CRO)

13 July 2012
20:45

Report

Montenegro	68–102	France
Scoring by quarter: 23–34, 10–21, 13–20, 22–27
Pts: Pavić 16; Rebs: Radović 4 Asts: Pajović 5		Pts: Toupane 17; Rebs: Pourchot 10; Asts: Julien, Thalien 5

Vitranc Hall, Kranjska Gora
Attendance: 150
Referees: Lahdo Sharro (SWE), Leandro Nicolas Lezcano (ARG), David Berekashvili (GEO)

14 July 2012
16:15

Report

Montenegro	55–71	Germany
Scoring by quarter: 18–12, 15–22, 6–21, 16–16
Pts: Nikolić 18; Rebs: Pavić 6 Asts: Mugoša 4		Pts: Mönninghoff 15; Rebs: Voigtmann 11; Asts: Schröder 3

Vitranc Hall, Kranjska Gora
Attendance: 150
Referees: Lahdo Sharro (SWE), Ersan Kartal (TUR), David Berekashvili (GEO)

14 July 2012
18:30

Report

France	67–70	Serbia
Scoring by quarter: 14–14, 17–11, 18–29, 18–16
Pts: Jean-Charles 17; Rebs: Labeyrie, Jean-Charles 5 Asts: Jean-Charles 4		Pts: Bešović 17; Rebs: Marinković 5 Asts: Miljenović 3

Vitranc Hall, Kranjska Gora
Attendance: 200
Referees: Luigi Lamonica (ITA), Tomasz Trawicki (POL), Gintaras Vitkauskas (LTU)

==== Group B ====
Team	Pld	W	L	PF	PA	PD	Pts
Russia	3	3	0	233	197	+36	6
Greece	3	2	1	244	221	+23	5
Ukraine	3	1	2	233	239	−6	4
Estonia	3	0	3	196	249	−53	3

12 July 2012
16:15

Report

Russia	86–58	Estonia
Scoring by quarter: 21–14, 26–19, 22–12, 17–13
Pts: Trushkin 16; Rebs: Trushkin, Orlenko 6 Asts: Vernakov 4		Pts: Metsalu 11; Rebs: Paasoja, Nurger 5 Asts: Puidet 3

Vitranc Hall, Kranjska Gora
Attendance: 100
Referees: Lahdo Sharro (SWE), Ingus Baumanis (LAT), Nikola Perlić (CRO)

12 July 2012
18:30

Report

Greece	89–86 (OT)	Ukraine
Scoring by quarter: 24–24, 17–15, 18–26, 17–11, Overtime: 13–10
Pts: Antonakis 21; Rebs: Melissaratos 6 Asts: Antonakis, Larentzakis 3		Pts: Pustovyi 19; Rebs: Pustovyi 10; Asts: Artamonov 6

Vitranc Hall, Kranjska Gora
Attendance: 100
Referees: Luigi Lamonica (ITA), Tomasz Trawicki (POL), David Berekashvili (GEO)

13 July 2012
14:00

Report

Ukraine	75–81	Russia
Scoring by quarter: 13–22, 21–18, 17–24, 24–17
Pts: Mishula 23; Rebs: Bobrov 11; Asts: Artamonov 8		Pts: Trushkin 15; Rebs: Orlenko 8 Asts: Zaryazhko 5

Vitranc Hall, Kranjska Gora
Attendance: 50
Referees: Tomasz Trawicki (POL), Aleksandar Milojević (MKD), Ersan Kartal (TUR)

13 July 2012
16:15

Report

Estonia	69–91	Greece
Scoring by quarter: 13–28, 15–17, 22–21, 19–25
Pts: Raap 13; Rebs: Puidet 6 Asts: Laane 6		Pts: Larentzakis 28; Rebs: Larentzakis 10; Asts: Antonakis 6

Vitranc Hall, Kranjska Gora
Attendance: 110
Referees: Miguel Perez Perez (ESP), Marko Vučković (SLO), Gintaras Vitkauskas (LTU)

14 July 2012
14:00

Report

Estonia	69–72	Ukraine
Scoring by quarter: 15–21, 16–18, 17–17, 21–16
Pts: Paasoja 18; Rebs: Paasoja 8 Asts: Laane 3		Pts: Pustovyi 22; Rebs: Pustovyi 17; Asts: Artamonov 7

Vitranc Hall, Kranjska Gora
Attendance: 150
Referees: Aleksandar Milojević (MKD), Marko Vučković (SLO), Nikola Perlić (CRO)

21 July 2012
20:45

Report

Greece	64–66	Russia
Scoring by quarter: 16–19, 22–18, 20–9, 6–20
Pts: Motsenigos 17; Rebs: Antonakis 8 Asts: Antonakis 6		Pts: Trushkin 15; Rebs: Gudumak, Trushkin 8 Asts: three players 3

Vitranc Hall, Kranjska Gora
Attendance: 200
Referees: Miguel Perez Perez (ESP), Ingus Baumanis (LAT), Leandro Nicolas Lezcano (ARG)

==== Group C ====
Team	Pld	W	L	PF	PA	PD	Pts
Spain	3	3	0	254	160	+94	6
Turkey	3	2	1	227	207	+20	5
Latvia	3	1	2	200	178	+22	4
Georgia	3	0	3	166	302	−136	3

12 July 2012
16:15

Report

Latvia	88–50	Georgia
Scoring by quarter: 21–11, 19–11, 22–13, 26–15
Pts: Timma 21; Rebs: Timma 10; Asts: Timma 4		Pts: Bokolishvili 15; Rebs: Alkanaidze 8 Asts: Bokolishvili 3

Domžale Sports Hall, Domžale
Attendance: 50
Referees: Ademir Zurapović (BIH), Nicolas Maestre (FRA), Gabriel Benjamin Camacho White (SAI)

12 July 2012
18:30

Report

Turkey	60–79	Spain
Scoring by quarter: 21–18, 14–29, 14–16, 11–16
Pts: Edge 12; Rebs: Geyik 8 Asts: Geyik 3		Pts: Díez 21; Rebs: Barrera, Díez 6 Asts: four players 3

Domžale Sports Hall, Domžale
Attendance: 1,000
Referees: Igor Dragojević (MNE), Dubravko Muhvić (CRO), Sergiy Zashchuk (UKR)

13 July 2012
14:00

Report

Georgia	67–103	Turkey
Scoring by quarter: 16–25, 22–16, 12–26, 17–36
Pts: Sanadze 25; Rebs: Burjanadze 7 Asts: Pkhakadze 5		Pts: Candan 36; Rebs: Candan 10; Asts: Sonsırma, Edge 4

Domžale Sports Hall, Domžale
Attendance: 50
Referees: Ilija Belošević (SRB), Sergiy Zashchuk (UKR), Mart Uuehendrik (EST)

13 July 2012
18:30

Report

Spain	64–51	Latvia
Scoring by quarter: 11–11, 11–10, 21–15, 21–15
Pts: Fernández 19; Rebs: Guerra 5 Asts: three players 2		Pts: Coders 11; Rebs: Bērziņš 7 Asts: Vitols 2

Domžale Sports Hall, Domžale
Attendance: 800
Referees: Spyridon Gontas (GRE), Ademir Zurapović (BIH), Gabriel Benjamin Camacho White (SAI)

14 July 2012
14:00

Report

Turkey	64–61 (OT)	Latvia
Scoring by quarter: 20–17, 15–20, 6–9, 13–8, Overtime: 10–7
Pts: Edge 14; Rebs: Cantitiz 7 Asts: Edge 5		Pts: Silins 24; Rebs: Bērziņš 5 Asts: Coders, Timma 4

Domžale Sports Hall, Domžale
Attendance: 50
Referees: Igor Dragojević (MNE), Sergey Krug (RUS), Gabriel Benjamin Camacho White (SAI)

14 July 2012
16:15

Report

Georgia	49–111	Spain
Scoring by quarter: 13–29, 12–25, 19–32, 5–25
Pts: Burjanadze 15; Rebs: Alkhanaidze 6 Asts: Bokolishvili 2		Pts: Díez, Sanz 17; Rebs: Tomas 9 Asts: Sanz 4

Domžale Sports Hall, Domžale
Attendance: 200
Referees: Dubravko Muhvić (CRO), Oliver Krause (GER), Antonis Demetriou (CYP)

==== Group D ====
Team	Pld	W	L	PF	PA	PD	Pts
Slovenia	3	3	0	238	218	+20	6
Italy	3	2	1	244	225	+19	5
Lithuania	3	1	2	243	247	−4	4
Sweden	3	0	3	202	237	−35	3

12 July 2012
14:00

Report

Lithuania	80–71	Sweden
Scoring by quarter: 17–21, 24–18, 20–11, 19–21
Pts: Redikas 24; Rebs: Čižauskas 10; Asts: Redikas 3		Pts: Eriksson 30; Rebs: Norman 10; Asts: Person, Barton 3

Domžale Sports Hall, Domžale
Attendance: 100
Referees: Spyridon Gontas (GRE), Antonis Demetriou (CYP), Mart Uuehendrik (EST)

12 July 2012
21:00

Report

Slovenia	81–68	Italy
Scoring by quarter: 23–17, 20–17, 20–20, 18–14
Pts: Pajić 16; Rebs: Omić 9 Asts: Rupnik 5		Pts: Laganà 18; Rebs: Abass 7 Asts: Traini 5

Domžale Sports Hall, Domžale
Attendance: 2,000
Referees: Ilija Belošević (SRB), Oliver Krause (GER), Sergey Krug (RUS)

13 July 2012
16:15

Report

Italy	89–82	Lithuania
Scoring by quarter: 15–24, 23–15, 29–19, 22–24
Pts: Ceron 29; Rebs: Tessitori 5 Asts: Traini 4		Pts: Ulanovas 23; Rebs: Skucas 7 Asts: Redikas 5

Domžale Sports Hall, Domžale
Attendance: 500
Referees: Dubravko Muhvić (CRO), Sergey Krug (RUS), Oliver Krause (GER)

13 July 2012
20:45

Report

Sweden	69–70	Slovenia
Scoring by quarter: 18–18, 17–20, 13–11, 21–21
Pts: Person 20; Rebs: Norman 8 Asts: Barton, Borg 2		Pts: Omić 24; Rebs: Pajić, Prepelič 8 Asts: Rupnik, Prepelič 5

Domžale Sports Hall, Domžale
Attendance: 1,300
Referees: Igor Dragojević (MNE), Antonis Demetriou (CYP), Nicolas Maestre (FRA)

14 July 2012
18:30

Report

Sweden	62–87	Italy
Scoring by quarter: 24–18, 12–16, 12–25, 14–28
Pts: Borg 23; Rebs: Gaddefors 12; Asts: Gaddefors, Borg 2		Pts: Mian 16; Rebs: Mian 9 Asts: Traini 7

Domžale Sports Hall, Domžale
Attendance: 300
Referees: Ilija Belošević (SRB), Nicolas Maestre (FRA), Mart Uuehendrik (EST)

14 July 2012
20:45

Report

Slovenia	87–81	Lithuania
Scoring by quarter: 17–15, 25–15, 23–28, 22–23
Pts: Prepelič, Omić 20; Rebs: Morina 9 Asts: Prepelič 11		Pts: Čižauskas 16; Rebs: Čižauskas 8 Asts: Čižauskas, Redikas 4

Domžale Sports Hall, Domžale
Attendance: 2,200
Referees: Spyridon Gontas (GRE), Ademir Zurapović (BIH), Sergiy Zashchuk (UKR)

=== Second round ===
The twelve teams remaining will be allocated in two groups of six teams each. The four top teams will advance to the quarterfinals. The last two teams of each group will play for the 9th–12th place.

Team advances to the Quarterfinals
Team will compete in the 9th – 12th place playoffs

==== Group E ====
Team	Pld	W	L	PF	PA	PD	Pts	Tiebreaker
Serbia	5	5	0	391	295	+96	10	
Germany	5	3	2	337	329	+8	8	
Greece	5	2	3	362	383	−21	7	1–1, +15
France	5	2	3	330	320	+10	7	1–1, +2
Russia	5	2	3	329	378	−49	7	1–1, −17
Ukraine	5	1	4	357	401	−44	6	

16 July 2012
16:15

Report

France	81–62	Russia
Scoring by quarter: 18–9, 19–16, 23–20, 21–17
Pts: Invernizzi 19; Rebs: Gobert 8 Asts: Westermann 6		Pts: Razumov, Gudumak 12; Rebs: Trushkin 6 Asts: Varnakov, Goldyrev 2

Vitranc Hall, Kranjska Gora
Attendance: 150
Referees: Luigi Lamonica (ITA), Ingus Baumanis (LAT), Marko Vučković (SLO)

16 July 2012
18:30

Report

Greece	68–90	Germany
Scoring by quarter: 9–28, 18–20, 20–21, 21–21
Pts: Larentzakis 20; Rebs: Antonakis 7 Asts: Antonakis 6		Pts: Neumann 24; Rebs: Neumann, Richter 5 Asts: Schröder 5

Vitranc Hall, Kranjska Gora
Attendance: 200
Referees: Lahdo Sharro (SWE), Ersan Kartal (TUR), Nikola Perlić (CRO)

16 July 2012
20:45

Report

Ukraine	53–82	Serbia
Scoring by quarter: 20–23, 11–19, 15–23, 7–17
Pts: Pustovyi 14; Rebs: Bobrov 8 Asts: Bobrov 5		Pts: Nastić 15; Rebs: Nastić 7 Asts: Mitrović 2

Vitranc Hall, Kranjska Gora
Attendance: 150
Referees: Miguel Perez Perez (ESP), Gintaras Vitkauskas (LTU), David Berekashvili (GEO)

17 July 2012
16:15

Report

Germany	74–59	Russia
Scoring by quarter: 16–17, 21–12, 13–12, 24–18
Pts: Voigtmann 15; Rebs: Theis 6 Asts: Heckmann 4		Pts: Trushkin 11; Rebs: Trushkin 7 Asts: three players 2

Vitranc Hall, Kranjska Gora
Attendance: 150
Referees: Miguel Perez Perez (ESP), Gintaras Vitkauskas (LTU), Nikola Perlić (CRO)

17 July 2012
18:30

Report

Ukraine	62–75	France
Scoring by quarter: 21–15, 16–25, 14–23, 11–11
Pts: Pustovyi 23; Rebs: Bobrov 11; Asts: Bobrov 4		Pts: Westermann 18; Rebs: Jean-Charles 9 Asts: Westermann 5

Vitranc Hall, Kranjska Gora
Attendance: 100
Referees: Lahdo Sharro (SWE), Ersan Kartal (TUR), Ingus Baumanis (LAT)

17 July 2012
20:45

Report

Serbia	86–69	Greece
Scoring by quarter: 21–21, 17–16, 28–12, 20–20
Pts: Miljenović 16; Rebs: Mitrović 10; Asts: Bogdanović 6		Pts: Antonakis 21; Rebs: three players 3 Asts: Papadionysiou 5

Vitranc Hall, Kranjska Gora
Attendance: 200
Referees: Luigi Lamonica (ITA), Marko Vučković (SLO), David Berekashvili (GEO)

18 July 2012
16:15

Report

Germany	74–81	Ukraine
Scoring by quarter: 11–18, 19–20, 23–23, 21–20
Pts: Neumann 17; Rebs: Voigtmann 6 Asts: Heckmann 3		Pts: Mishula 18; Rebs: Bobrov 12; Asts: Artamonov 7

Vitranc Hall, Kranjska Gora
Attendance: 70
Referees: Luigi Lamonica (ITA), Marko Vučković (SLO), David Berekashvili (GEO)

18 July 2012
18:30

Report

Russia	61–84	Serbia
Scoring by quarter: 13–22, 15–15, 14–30, 19–17
Pts: Zakharov 20; Rebs: Trushkin 10; Asts: five players 2		Pts: Miljenović 15; Rebs: Nastić 9 Asts: Bogdanović 5

Vitranc Hall, Kranjska Gora
Attendance: 150
Referees: Lahdo Sharro (SWE), Ingus Baumanis (LAT), Gintaras Vitkauskas (LTU)

18 July 2012
20:45

Report

Greece	72–55	France
Scoring by quarter: 10–13, 17–13, 23–9, 22–20
Pts: Motsenigos 18; Rebs: Melissaratos; Asts: Motsenigos, Larentzakis 3		Pts: Westermann 14; Rebs: Labeyrie 9 Asts: Westermann 3

Vitranc Hall, Kranjska Gora
Attendance: 150
Referees: Miguel Perez Perez (ESP), Ersan Kartal (TUR), Nikola Perlić (CRO)

==== Group F ====
Team	Pld	W	L	PF	PA	PD	Pts	Tiebreaker
Slovenia	5	5	0	379	345	+34	10	
Lithuania	5	2	3	396	359	+37	7	2–2, +43
Spain	5	2	3	342	341	+1	7	2–2, +8
Latvia	5	2	3	346	350	−4	7	2–2, +3
Turkey	5	2	3	335	356	−21	7	2–2, −18
Italy	5	2	3	381	428	−47	7	2–2, −34

16 July 2012
16:15

Report

Lithuania	82–60	Spain
Scoring by quarter: 20–18, 20–16, 24–10, 18–16
Pts: Ulanovas 28; Rebs: Čižauskas, Ulanovas 7 Asts: Redikas 6		Pts: Fernández 15; Rebs: Abrines 8 Asts: Pozas 4

Domžale Sports Hall, Domžale
Attendance: 400
Referees: Ilija Belošević (SRB), Igor Dragojević (MNE), Antonis Demetriou (CYP)

16 July 2012
18:30

Report

Italy	68–95	Turkey
Scoring by quarter: 8–25, 20–27, 24–21, 16–22
Pts: Laganà 20; Rebs: three players 4 Asts: Saccaggi 3		Pts: Edge 18; Rebs: Edge 9 Asts: Eroğlu 5

Domžale Sports Hall, Domžale
Attendance: 300
Referees: Ademir Zurapović (BIH), Sergey Krug (RUS), Oliver Krause (GER)

16 July 2012
20:45

Report

Latvia	62–69	Slovenia
Scoring by quarter: 20–14, 17–23, 13–18, 12–14
Pts: Timma 17; Rebs: Siliņš 6 Asts: Vitols 4		Pts: Omić 14; Rebs: Pajič, Omić 7 Asts: Prepelič 6

Domžale Sports Hall, Domžale
Attendance: 1,800
Referees: Tomasz Trawicki (POL), Dubravko Muhvić (CRO), Aleksandar Milojević (MKD)

17 July 2012
16:15

Report

Spain	76–78	Italy
Scoring by quarter: 28–22, 11–13, 17–22, 20–21
Pts: Díez 17; Rebs: Díez 7 Asts: Olaizola 4		Pts: Abass 24; Rebs: Abass 12; Asts: Saccaggi, Cefarelli 2

Domžale Sports Hall, Domžale
Attendance: 150
Referees: Dubravko Muhvić (CRO), Nicolas Maestre (FRA), Leandro Nicolas Lezcano (ARG)

17 July 2012
18:30

Report

Lithuania	75–78	Latvia
Scoring by quarter: 20–21, 20–18, 13–17, 22–22
Pts: Ulanovas 15; Rebs: Butkevičius, Čižauskas 6 Asts: Čižauskas 5		Pts: Helmanis, Timma 15; Rebs: Siliņš 8 Asts: Vitols, Coders 3

Domžale Sports Hall, Domžale
Attendance: 300
Referees: Ademir Zurapović (BIH), Sergiy Zashchuk (UKR), Mart Uuehendrik (EST)

17 July 2012
20:45

Report

Turkey	71–72	Slovenia
Scoring by quarter: 21–19, 18–22, 21–15, 11–16
Pts: Candan 15; Rebs: Cantitiz 7 Asts: Edge 5		Pts: Prepelič 29; Rebs: Omić 9 Asts: Prepelič 4

Domžale Sports Hall, Domžale
Attendance: 2,000
Referees: Spyridon Gontas (GRE), Igor Dragojević (MNE), Oliver Krause (GER)

18 July 2012
16:15

Report

Italy	78–94	Latvia
Scoring by quarter: 14–19, 16–28, 17–24, 31–23
Pts: Tessitori 16; Rebs: four players 3 Asts: Traini 4		Pts: Timma 25; Rebs: Siliņš 8 Asts: Timma, Siliņš 4

Domžale Sports Hall, Domžale
Attendance: 200
Referees: Spyridon Gontas (GRE), Oliver Krause (GER), Tomasz Trawicki (POL)

18 July 2012
18:30

Report

Turkey	45–76	Lithuania
Scoring by quarter: 14–22, 9–24, 5–14, 17–16
Pts: Geyik 12; Rebs: Geyik 7 Asts: Eroğlu 3		Pts: Ulanovas 14; Rebs: Skučas, Ulanovas 6 Asts: Čižauskas 5

Domžale Sports Hall, Domžale
Attendance: 350
Referees: Dubravko Muhvić (CRO), Aleksandar Milojević (MKD), Leandro Nicolas Lezcano (ARG)

18 July 2012
20:45

Report

Slovenia	70–63	Spain
Scoring by quarter: 18–14, 14–17, 20–12, 18–20
Pts: Omić 14; Rebs: Omić 8 Asts: three players 3		Pts: Abrines 18; Rebs: Oriola 8 Asts: Fernández 3

Domžale Sports Hall, Domžale
Attendance: 2,400
Referees: Ilija Belošević (SRB), Ademir Zurapović (BIH), Antonis Demetriou (CYP)

=== Classification round ===
The last teams of each group in the first round will compete in this classification round.

==== Group G ====
Team	Pld	W	L	PF	PA	PD	Pts
Sweden	6	5	1	448	401	+47	11
Montenegro	6	4	2	473	414	+59	10
Estonia	6	2	4	426	467	−41	8
Georgia	6	1	5	426	491	−65	7

16 July 2012
17:30

Report

Montenegro	64–72	Sweden
Scoring by quarter: 20–11, 11–17, 21–22, 12–22
Pts: Mugoša 19; Rebs: Pavić 14; Asts: Mugoša 5		Pts: Eriksson 21; Rebs: Gaddefors 10; Asts: three players 3

Arena Stožice, Ljubljana
Attendance: 50
Referees: Spyridon Gontas (GRE), Nicolas Maestre (FRA), Mart Uuehendrik (EST)

16 July 2012
20:00

Report

Estonia	87–73	Georgia
Scoring by quarter: 19–16, 24–20, 20–24, 24–13
Pts: Nurger 17; Rebs: Paasoja 11; Asts: Laane 7		Pts: Burjanadze 21; Rebs: Burjanadze 11; Asts: Bokolishvili, Pkhakadze 5

Arena Stožice, Ljubljana
Attendance: 50
Referees: Sergiy Zashchuk (UKR), Gabriel Benjamin Camacho White (SAI), Leandro Nicolas Lezcano (ARG)

17 July 2012
17:30

Report

Sweden	69–66	Estonia
Scoring by quarter: 15–18, 11–16, 25–13, 18–19
Pts: Person 21; Rebs: Norman 10; Asts: four players 3		Pts: Paasoja 14; Rebs: Paasoja 10; Asts: Laane 3

Arena Stožice, Ljubljana
Attendance: 50
Referees: Tomasz Trawicki (POL), Sergey Krug (RUS), Gabriel Benjamin Camacho White (SAI)

17 July 2012
20:00

Report

Georgia	65–81	Montenegro
Scoring by quarter: 8–26, 20–17, 22–21, 15–17
Pts: Sanadze 22; Rebs: Burjanadze 8 Asts: Pkhakadze 6		Pts: Mugoša 21; Rebs: Pavić 14; Asts: Latković 7

Arena Stožice, Ljubljana
Attendance: 20
Referees: Ilija Belošević (SRB), Aleksandar Milojević (MKD), Antonis Demetriou (CYP)

18 July 2012
17:30

Report

Montenegro	72–76	Estonia
Scoring by quarter: 19–20, 19–16, 16–17, 18–23
Pts: Nikolić 24; Rebs: Nikolić 10; Asts: Pajović 5		Pts: Puidet 20; Rebs: Puidet, Nurger 6 Asts: Laane 4

Arena Stožice, Ljubljana
Attendance: 20
Referees: Sergiy Zashchuk (UKR), Sergey Krug (RUS), Gabriel Benjamin Camacho White (SAI)

18 July 2012
20:00

Report

Georgia	64–87	Sweden
Scoring by quarter: 21–21, 16–22, 16–27, 11–17
Pts: Burjanadze 20; Rebs: Burjanadze 9 Asts: Pkhakadze 3		Pts: Borg 22; Rebs: Gaddefors 11; Asts: Gaddefors, Borg 4

Arena Stožice, Ljubljana
Attendance: 30
Referees: Igor Dragojević (MNE), Nicolas Maestre (FRA), Mart Uuehendrik (EST)

20 July 2012
14:00

Report

Georgia	75–72	Estonia
Scoring by quarter: 17–17, 16–19, 20–19, 22–17
Pts: Burjanadze 22; Rebs: Burjanadze 12; Asts: Pkhakadze 3		Pts: Raap 15; Rebs: Raap 7 Asts: Laane 3

Domžale Sports Hall, Domžale
Attendance: 10
Referees: Antonis Demetriou (CYP), Ingus Baumanis (LAT), Marko Vučković (SLO)

20 July 2012
16:15

Report

Sweden	48–86	Montenegro
Scoring by quarter: 9–21, 13–20, 13–33, 13–12
Pts: Eriksson 16; Rebs: Isaksson 5 Asts: Person 3		Pts: Mugosa 23; Rebs: Nikolic 11; Asts: Grabovica 11

Domžale Sports Hall, Domžale
Attendance: 50
Referees: Sergey Krug (RUS), Gintaras Vitkauskas (LTU), David Berekashvili (GEO)

21 July 2012
14:00

Report

Montenegro	83–82	Georgia
Scoring by quarter: 26–7, 14–25, 21–24, 22–26
Pts: Mugosa 22; Rebs: Raičković 9 Asts: Pajović 8		Pts: Sanadze 20; Rebs: Sanadze 11; Asts: Pkhakadze 5

Domžale Sports Hall, Domžale
Attendance: 20
Referees: Oliver Krause (GER), Sergiy Zashchuk (UKR), Gabriel Benjamin Camacho White (SAI)

21 July 2012
16:15

Report

Estonia	54–91	Sweden
Scoring by quarter: 13–18, 14–23, 14–29, 13–21
Pts: Metsalu 15; Rebs: Nurger 7 Asts: Laane 5		Pts: Gaddefors 13; Rebs: Gaddefors, Guténius 7 Asts: Gaddefors, Barton 4

Domžale Sports Hall, Domžale
Attendance: 50
Referees: Tomasz Trawicki (POL), Ingus Baumanis (LAT), David Berekashvili (GEO)

22 July 2012
14:00

Report

Sweden	81–67	Georgia
Scoring by quarter: 21–21, 22–21, 27–11, 11–14
Pts: 3 players 15; Rebs: Gaddefors 9 Asts: Gaddefors 6		Pts: Sanadze 27; Rebs: Burjanadze 10; Asts: Bokolishvili, Tenieshvili 2

Domžale Sports Hall, Domžale
Attendance: 50
Referees: Marko Vučković (SLO), Gintaras Vitkauskas (LTU), Nikola Perlić (CRO)

22 July 2012
16:15

Report

Estonia	71–87	Montenegro
Scoring by quarter: 26–18, 13–18, 14–20, 18–31
Pts: Paasoja 24; Rebs: Laane 8 Asts: Raap 8		Pts: Mugoša 24; Rebs: Nikolić 13; Asts: Grabovica 5

Domžale Sports Hall, Domžale
Attendance: 100
Referees: Tomasz Trawicki (POL), Nicolas Maestre (FRA), David Berekashvili (GEO)

== Knockout round ==
=== Championship ===
Quarter-finals
July 20
Serbia	74
Latvia	65
July 20
Lithuania	79
Greece	43
July 20
Slovenia	54
France	77
July 20
Germany	47
Spain	73

Semi-finals
July 21
Serbia	68
Lithuania	73
July 21
France	66
Spain	59

Final
July 22
Lithuania	50
France	49
Third place
July 22
Serbia	66
Spain	67

==== Quarterfinals ====
20 July 2012
14:00

Report

Lithuania	79–43	Greece
Scoring by quarter: 15–10, 23–13, 29–8, 12–12
Pts: Ulanovas 18; Rebs: Mockevicius 10; Asts: Čižauskas 7		Pts: Melissaratos 15; Rebs: Melissaratos 8 Asts: Antonakis 3

Arena Stožice, Ljubljana
Attendance: 200
Referees: Ademir Zurapović (BIH), Dubravko Muhvić (CRO), Aleksandar Milojević (MKD)

20 July 2012
16:15

Report

Serbia	74–65	Latvia
Scoring by quarter: 18–12, 11–17, 22–20, 23–16
Pts: Mitrović 16; Rebs: Mitrović 10; Asts: Cvetković 3		Pts: Timma 16; Rebs: Timma 6 Asts: Coders, Vitols 2

Arena Stožice, Ljubljana
Attendance: 600
Referees: Miguel Pérez Pérez (ESP), Oliver Krause (GER), Leandro Nicolas Lezcano (ARG)

20 July 2012
18:30

Report

Germany	47–73	Spain
Scoring by quarter: 8–13, 16–20, 15–20, 8–20
Pts: Schröder 9 Rebs: Theis 12; Asts: Schröder 3		Pts: Díez 22; Rebs: Díez 11; Asts: Pozas 5

Arena Stožice, Ljubljana
Attendance: 1,500
Referees: Ilija Belošević (SRB), Lahdo Sharro (SWE), Sergiy Zashchuk (UKR)

20 July 2012
20:45

Report

Slovenia	54–77	France
Scoring by quarter: 19–15, 13–13, 8–26, 14–23
Pts: Prepelič 17; Rebs: Pajić 7 Asts: three players 2		Pts: Westermann 21; Rebs: Gobert 12; Asts: Westermann 7

Arena Stožice, Ljubljana
Attendance: 6,000
Referees: Luigi Lamonica (ITA), Spyridon Gontas (GRE), Ersan Kartal (TUR)

==== Semifinals ====
21 July 2012
18:00

Report

Serbia	68–73	Lithuania
Scoring by quarter: 17–21, 13–16, 22–16, 16–20
Pts: Bogdanović 16; Rebs: Nastić 9 Asts: Cvetković 4		Pts: Skučas 14; Rebs: Ulanovas 7 Asts: Čižauskas 7

Arena Stožice, Ljubljana
Attendance: 2,000
Referees: Spyridon Gontas (GRE), Lahdo Sharro (SWE), Ersan Kartal (TUR)

21 July 2012
20:45

Report

Spain	59–66	France
Scoring by quarter: 15–16, 16–15, 13–16, 15–19
Pts: Díez 17; Rebs: Díez 13; Asts: Sanz, Pozas 2		Pts: Invernizzi 16; Rebs: Gobert 10; Asts: Westermann 3

Arena Stožice, Ljubljana
Attendance: 1,500
Referees: Ademir Zurapović (BIH), Igor Dragojević (MNE), Aleksandar Milojević (MKD)

==== Bronze-medal game ====
22 July 2012
18:00

Report

Serbia	66–67	Spain
Scoring by quarter: 18–18, 15–14, 16–20, 17–15
Pts: Mitrović 15; Rebs: Mitrović 10; Asts: Cvetković 3		Pts: Fernández 16; Rebs: Díez, Guerra 6 Asts: Abrines 3

Arena Stožice, Ljubljana
Attendance: 2,000
Referees: Ademir Zurapović (BIH), Ersan Kartal (TUR), Leandro Nicolas Lezcano (ARG)

==== Final ====
22 July 2012
20:45

Report

Lithuania	50–49	France
Scoring by quarter: 24–11, 12–13, 7–12, 7–13
Pts: Mockevicius 11; Rebs: Čižauskas 8 Asts: Čižauskas 6		Pts: Toupane 16; Rebs: Jean-Charles 12; Asts: Westermann 5

Arena Stožice, Ljubljana
Attendance: 3,500
Referees: Luigi Lamonica (ITA), Ilija Belošević (SRB), Miguel Perez Perez (ESP)

=== 5th–8th playoffs ===
Semi-finals
July 21
Latvia	76
Greece	74
July 21
Germany	65
Slovenia	53

Fifth place
July 22
Latvia	63
Germany	80
Seventh place
July 22
Greece	61
Slovenia	80

==== Classification 5–8 ====
21 July 2012
13:30

Report

Latvia	76–74	Greece
Scoring by quarter: 16–24, 21–18, 19–16, 20–16
Pts: Bremers, Helmanis 12; Rebs: Timma, Berzins 6 Asts: Timma, Vitols 3		Pts: Larentzakis 31; Rebs: Melissaratos 9 Asts: Antonakis, Panagiotaras 4

Arena Stožice, Ljubljana
Attendance: 100
Referees: Ilija Belošević (SRB), Sergey Krug (RUS), Marko Vučković (SLO)

21 July 2012
15:45

Report

Germany	65–53	Slovenia
Scoring by quarter: 10–21, 20–14, 12–13, 23–5
Pts: Wendt 18; Rebs: Neumann 9 Asts: Bekteshi 2		Pts: Pajić, Lapornik 10; Rebs: Omić 8 Asts: Rupnik 4

Arena Stožice, Ljubljana
Attendance: 2,000
Referees: Miguel Perez Perez (ESP), Antonis Demetriou (CYP), Leandro Nicolas Lezcano (ARG)

==== 7th-place game ====
22 July 2012
13:30

Report

Greece	61–80	Slovenia
Scoring by quarter: 11–20, 18–19, 18–21, 14–20
Pts: Antonakis 20; Rebs: Melissaratos 6 Asts: Panagiotaras, Larentzakis 4		Pts: Omić 23; Rebs: Omić 10; Asts: Rojc 5

Arena Stožice, Ljubljana
Attendance: 1,000
Referees: Oliver Krause (GER), Ingus Baumanis (LAT), Mart Uuehendrik (EST)

==== 5th-place game ====
22 July 2012
15:45

Report

Latvia	63–80	Germany
Scoring by quarter: 16–13, 16–18, 13–26, 18–23
Pts: Bricis 16; Rebs: Bricis 9 Asts: Vitols 4		Pts: Voigtmann 15; Rebs: Neumann 10; Asts: Heckmann, Schröder 2

Arena Stožice, Ljubljana
Attendance: 200
Referees: Igor Dragojević (MNE), Aleksandar Milojević (MKD), Sergiy Zashchuk (UKR)

=== 9th–12th playoffs ===
Semi-finals
July 20
Russia	68
Italy	69
July 20
Turkey	74
Ukraine	47

Ninth place
July 21
Turkey	65
Italy	61
Eleventh place
July 21
Russia	83
Ukraine	63

==== Classification 9–12 ====
20 July 2012
18:30

Report

Russia	68–69	Italy
Scoring by quarter: 24–13, 16–12, 7–20, 21–24
Pts: Varnakov 12; Rebs: Trushkin 10; Asts: Varnakov 4		Pts: Tessitori 17; Rebs: Abaas 6 Asts: Traini 4

Domžale Sports Hall, Domžale
Attendance: 200
Referees: Igor Dragojević (MNE), Nicolas Maestre (FRA), Gabriel Benjamin Camacho White (SAI)

20 July 2012
20:45

Report

Turkey	74–47	Ukraine
Scoring by quarter: 22–8, 18–14, 18–10, 16–15
Pts: Eroğlu 14; Rebs: Tekin, Dokuyan 7 Asts: three players 2		Pts: Bobrov 9 Rebs: Bobrov 10; Asts: Artamonov 5

Domžale Sports Hall, Domžale
Attendance: 200
Referees: Tomasz Trawicki (POL), Mart Uuehendrik (EST), Nikola Perlić (CRO)

==== 11th-place game ====
21 July 2012
18:30

Report

Russia	83–63	Ukraine
Scoring by quarter: 19–14, 22–20, 20–13, 22–16
Pts: Zakharov 13; Rebs: three players 6 Asts: Zaryazhko 7		Pts: Mishula 14; Rebs: Zagreba, Bobrov 7 Asts: Artamonov 6

Domžale Sports Hall, Domžale
Attendance: 23
Referees: Luigi Lamonica (ITA), Gintaras Vitkauskas (LTU), Nikola Perlić (CRO)

==== 9th-place game ====
21 July 2012
20:45

Report

Italy	61–65	Turkey
Scoring by quarter: 19–19, 23–14, 12–16, 7–16
Pts: Tessitori 15; Rebs: Tessitori 5 Asts: Traini 4		Pts: Tuncer 13; Rebs: Tekin 10; Asts: Tuncer, Eroğlu 3

Domžale Sports Hall, Domžale
Attendance: 17
Referees: Dubravko Muhvić (CRO), Nicolas Maestre (FRA), Mart Uuehendrik (EST)

== Final standings ==
Rank	Team
1st place, gold medalist(s)	Lithuania
2nd place, silver medalist(s)	France
3rd place, bronze medalist(s)	Spain
4th	Serbia
5th	Germany
6th	Latvia
7th	Slovenia
8th	Greece
9th	Turkey
10th	Italy
11th	Russia
12th	Ukraine
13th	Sweden
14th	Montenegro
15th	Estonia
16th	Georgia

2012 FIBA Europe Under-20 Championship winners

Lithuania
Second title

== Awards ==
Most Valuable Player
(France) Léo Westermann

All-Tournament Team

- (France) Léo Westermann
- (Slovenia) Klemen Prepelič
- (Lithuania) Edgaras Ulanovas
- (Spain) Daniel Díez
- (France) Rudy Gobert
