= Giorgos Dritsas =

Greek basketball player

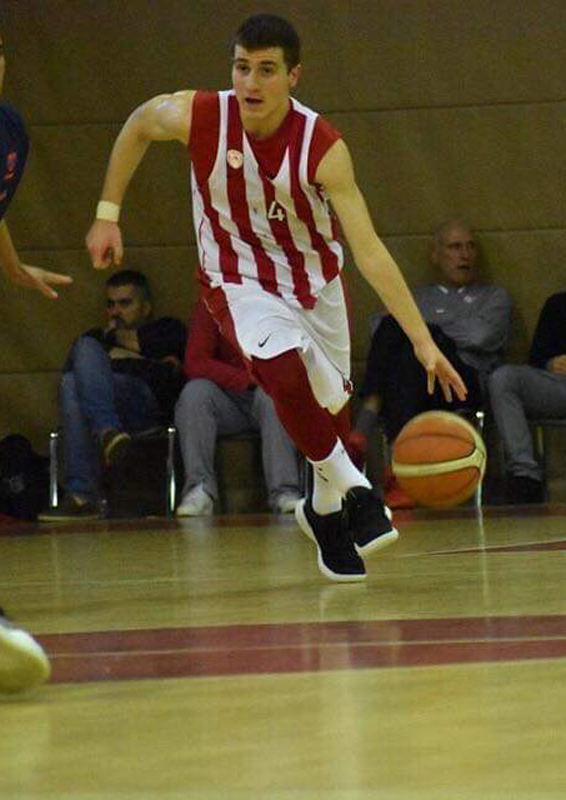

Panellinios B.C.
- Position: Point guard
- League: Greek B Basket League

Personal information
- Born: 5 June 2003 (age 23) Athens, Greece
- Listed height: 5 ft 11.5 in (1.82 m)
- Listed weight: 156.5 lb (71 kg)

Career information
- Playing career: 2020–present

Career history
- 2020–2021: Olympiacos B
- 2021–2022: Triton BC
- 2022–2023: Palaio Faliro B.C.
- 2023–2024: F.E.A. N.F-N.C.
- 2024–present: Panellinios B.C.

Career highlights
- 2× Greek Champion U-18 (2019, 2021)

Giorgos Dritsas (Greek: Γιώργος Δρίτσας; born 5 June 2003) is a Greek professional basketball player for Panellinios B.C. of the Greek B Basket League. He is a 1.82 m (5' 1/2") tall point guard.

== Early career ==
Dritsas started to play for Olympiacos BC Academy in 2017. He was member of the team that won the U-18 Championships in 2019 and 2021.

In August 2021 U-18 Greek Championship at Thessaloniki, he played in all 5 matches for Olympiakos BC U-18, averaging 12.4 points, 2.4 rebounds, 3.0 assists and 0.8 steals per game.

== Professional career ==
=== Olympiacos B (2020-2021) ===
Dritsas began his pro career in 2020, during the 2020-21 season, with the Greek 2nd Division club Olympiacos' reserve team, Olympiacos B.

==== 2020-2021: Rookie season ====
He made 5 appearances during the Greek A2 Basket League 2020–21 season and helped his team to win promotion to the Greek Basket League. He averaged 1.8 points, 0.2 rebounds, 0.4 assists and 0.2 steals per game.

=== Triton BC (2021-2022) ===
In September 2021 Dritsas signed contract with the Greek 2nd Division club Triton BC. He made 21 appearances during the Greek A2 Basket League 2021–22 season and averaged 2.4 points, 1.2 rebounds, 1.3 assists and 0.5 steals per game in 8.4 minutes, as Triton finished 3rd in championship.

=== Palaio Faliro B.C. (2022-2023) ===
In June 2022 Dritsas signed contract with the Greek B Basket League club Palaio Faliro B.C. He made 19 appearances during the season and averaged 6.3 points per game, as Palaio Faliro B.C. finished 4th in championship and participated in playoffs.

=== Filathlitiki Enosi Athlopedion N.F.-N.C. (2023-2024) ===
In June 2023 Dritsas moved to Greek B Basket League club Filathlitiki Enosi Athlopedion N.F.-N.C.. He made 24 appearances during the season and averaged 18.2 points per game. He hit 78 three-pointers, a record for this season in Greek B Basket League.

=== Panellinios B.C. (2024-present) ===
In June 2024 Dritsas became player of Greek B Basket League club Panellinios B.C.
