= Trushkin =

Trushkin (feminine: Trushkina, Russian: Трушкин) is a Russian surname. Notable people with the surname include:

- Igor Trushkin (born 1994), Russian futsal player
- Vladislav Trushkin (born 1993), Russian basketball player
- Yuliya Trushkina (born 2002), Belarusian canoeist
