= Stathis Papadionysiou =

Greek basketball player (born 1992)

Personal information
- Born: September 15, 1992 (age 34) Marousi, Athens, Greece
- Listed height: 6 ft 5.75 in (1.97 m)
- Listed weight: 210 lb (95 kg)

Career information
- NBA draft: 2014: undrafted
- Playing career: 2013–present
- Position: Shooting guard / small forward

Career history
- 2013–2015: AEK Athens
- 2015–2016: Pagrati
- 2016–2017: Aiolos Astakou
- 2017–2018: Iraklis
- 2018–2020: Charilaos Trikoupis
- 2020–2021: Olympiacos B
- 2021–2022: Charilaos Trikoupis
- 2022–2024: Panionios

Career highlights
- 2× Greek 2nd Division champion (2014, 2020)

Efstathios Papadionysiou, commonly known as Stathis Papadionysiou (Greek: Ευστάθιος "Στάθης" Παπαδιονυσίου; born September 15, 1992) is a Greek professional basketball player. At a height of 1.97 m (6'5 3/4") tall, he plays at the shooting guard and small forward positions.

== Professional career ==
Papadionysiou began his pro career in the 2013–14 season, with AEK Athens of the Greek 2nd Division. He then played with AEK Athens in Greece's First Division, in the following 2014–15 season. After that, Papadionysiou played with the Greek clubs Pagrati Athens (2015–16), Aiolos Astakou (2016–17), Iraklis Thessaloniki (2017–18), and Charilaos Trikoupis (2018–2020). While he was a member of Charilaos Trikoupis, he won the Greek 2nd Division championship, in the 2019–20 season.

Papadionysiou joined the Olympiacos B Development Team, for the 2020–21 season. On August 8, 2021, Papadionysiou returned to Charilaos Trikoupis.

== National team career ==
Papadionysiou was a member of the junior national teams of Greece. With Greece's junior national teams, he played at the 2010 FIBA Europe Under-18 Championship, and at the 2012 FIBA Europe Under-20 Championship.
