= KK Lim Berane =

- Nickname: Bijelo-plavi (White-blues); Plavo- bijeli (Blue- whites)
- Leagues: Prva A Liga
- Arena: Sportski centar Berane (capacity: 3,000)
- Location: Berane, Montenegro
- Team colors: Blue and White
- President: Blažo Ivanović
- Head coach: Danilo Jovanović
- Assistant: Matija Stijović
- Team captain: Danilo Joksimović
- Championships: 1 Prva B Liga 2025/26
Home	Away

KK Lim Berane is a basketball team playing currently in Montenegrin I A EKO MCKL. Team colors are blue and white.

== History ==
The club achieved its greatest historic success on April 18, 2026, when it secured promotion to the top-tier Montenegrin Prva A Liga, bringing elite basketball back to Berane after exactly three decades. KK Lim clinched the title one round before the end of the Prva B MCKL season by defeating Rudar 92–53 in front of a sold-out home crowd, opening the game with a dominant 34–4 first quarter. Led by team captain Danilo Joksimović, head coach Goran Todić and assistant Matija Stijović, and club president Blažo Ivanović, the team finished the season at the top of the table with a 12–3 record.

== Supporters ==
Berane supporters are known as "Uličari" (Streetboys). A group formed in 1994.

== Roster ==
KK Lim Berane roster
Players
Coaches

Pos.	No.	Nat.	Name	Ht.	Wt.	Age
PG	4	(Montenegro)	Brakočević, Miomir
SG	24	(Montenegro)	Babović, Matija
SG	20	(Montenegro)	Bogavac, Luka
SG	77	(Montenegro)	Dragović, Andrija
PG	6	(Montenegro)	Bojović, Darko
SF	14	(Montenegro)	Joksimović, Stefan
PF	20	(Montenegro)	Joksimović, Danilo (C)
C	10	(Montenegro)	Malisić, Ivan
SF	16	(Serbia)	Bronja, Edib
SG	44	(Montenegro)	Bogavac, Vanja Bogavac
PG		(United States)	Warren JR, Keith Alvar
C	21	(Serbia)	Miholjčić, Tomislav
C	34	(Montenegro)	Ojdanić, Petar

Head coach

- (Montenegro) Goran Todić

Assistant coach(es)

- (Montenegro) Matija Stijović

Legend

- (C) Team captain
- Injured

- Roster
Updated: Jun, 25, 2026.

== Notable former players ==
- (Montenegro) Vladimir Tomašević
- (Montenegro) Vladimir Dašić
- (Montenegro) Miloš Komatina

== See also ==
- Handball Club Berane
- Football Club Berane
