= Marko Mugosa =

Marko Mugosa may refer to:

- Marko Mugoša (born 1984), Montenegrin footballer
- Marko Mugosa (basketball) (born 1993), Montenegrin basketball player
