= Razumov =

Razumov a surname and can refer to:

- Razumov (crater), a lunar crater
- Aleksandr Razumov (born 1980), Russian professional footballer
- Dmitry Razumov (born 1975), Russian businessman
- Maksim Razumaw (born 1977), Belarusian professional footballer
- Alternating sign matrix, a mathematical model related to the Razumov–Stroganov conjecture
- Razumov (film), a 1936 French film
