= Andrea Traini =

Italian basketball player (born 1992)

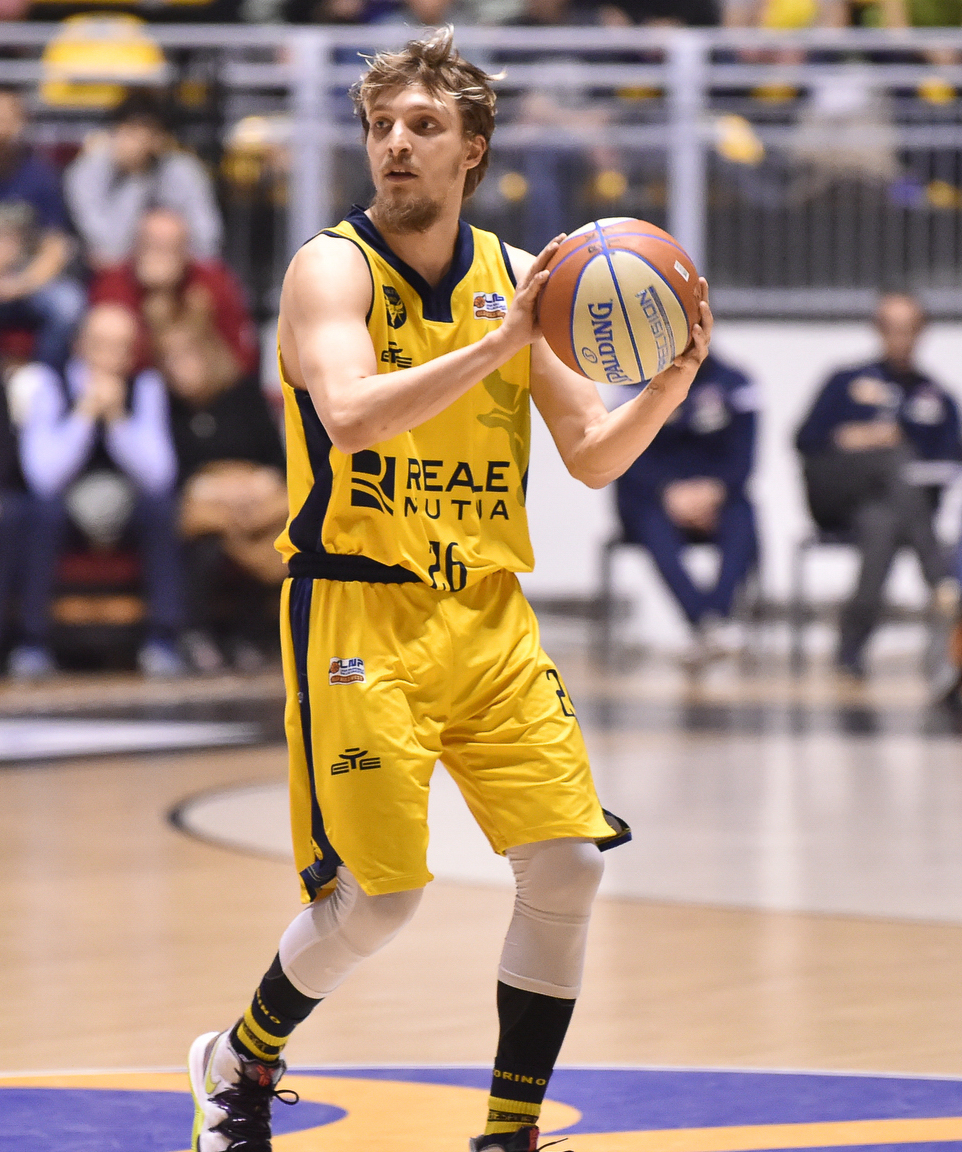
- Traini in 2020

Real Sebastiani Rieti
- Position: Point guard
- League: Serie B Basket

Personal information
- Born: 23 August 1992 (age 34) Loreto, Italy
- Listed height: 180 cm (5 ft 11 in)
- Listed weight: 80 kg (176 lb)

Career information
- NBA draft: 2014: undrafted
- Playing career: 2010–present

Career history
- 2010–2014: Scavolini Pesaro
- 2012: →Basket Recanati
- 2014–2015: Givova Napoli
- 2015–2016: Recanati
- 2016–2017: Juvecaserta
- 2017–2018: Brescia
- 2018–2019: Sutor Montegranaro
- 2019–2020: Basket Torino
- 2020–present: Real Sebastiani Rieti
Medals
Men's basketball
Representing Italy
FIBA Europe Under-20 Championship
Silver medal – second place	2011 Bilbao	National Team

Andrea Traini (born August 23, 1992) is an Italian professional basketball player for Real Sebastiani Rieti of Italian Serie B Basket.

Traini spent the 2019-20 season with Basket Torino, averaging 4.9 points, 2.0 rebounds, and 2.0 assists per game. In 2020, he signed with Real Sebastiani Rieti and averaged 9.1 points, 4.6 assists, 4.0 rebounds, and 2.0 steals per game. Traini re-signed with the team on September 7, 2021.

== International career ==
The Italian started in the under age categories of Italy, first for the Under 16's at the 2008 European Championship and then notably winning the silver medal with the U20's at the 2011 European Championship. He also took part at the 2012 FIBA Europe Under-20 Championship. In 2013 it was called up by the Senior's National Team to take part at the 2013 Mediterranean Games, but he had to leave the team because of an injury.

== Career statistics ==
=== Lega Basket Serie A ===
Year	Team	GP	GS	MPG	FG%	3P%	FT%	RPG	APG	SPG	BPG	PPG
2010–11	Pesaro	21	0	6.7	.393	.315	.863	1.0	.2	.4	.0	2.4
2011–12	Pesaro	7	0	2.8	.333	.250	.0	.1	.0	.0	.0	0.7
2012–13	Pesaro	8	0	14.1	.448	.437	.900	1.8	.7	1	.0	6.3
Career		36	0	7.6	.411	.359	.881	1.0	.3	.4	.0	2.9

== Honours ==
=== Team ===
==== International ====
- European Under-20 Championship
  - 2011 Bilbao Silver
