= Vladimir Dašić =

Montenegrin basketball player

Danilovgrad
- Position: Small forward / power forward
- League: Montenegrin League

Personal information
- Born: 13 May 1988 (age 38) Titograd, SR Montenegro, SFR Yugoslavia
- Listed height: 6 ft 10 in (2.08 m)
- Listed weight: 235 lb (107 kg)

Career information
- NBA draft: 2010: undrafted
- Playing career: 2004–present

Career history
- 2004–2009: Budućnost
- 2009–2010: Real Madrid
- 2010: Gran Canaria
- 2010–2012: Lottomatica Roma
- 2012: Union Olimpija
- 2012: Beşiktaş
- 2013: Metalac Valjevo
- 2014: Al Ahli Dubai
- 2014–2015: Budućnost
- 2017: AEK Larnaca
- 2018–2019: Zadar
- 2019: Šibenka
- 2020–2021: Al Sadd
- 2021: Danilovgrad
- 2021–2022: Ternopil
- 2022–present: Danilovgrad

Career highlights
- 3× Montenegrin League champion (2007–2009); 4× Montenegrin Cup winner (2007–2009, 2015)
Medals
Men's basketball
Representing Serbia and Montenegro
U18 European Championship
Gold medal – first place	2005 Serbia and Montenegro	U18 Team
Representing Montenegro
Games of the Small States of Europe
Gold medal – first place	2015 Reykjavík	National Team

Vladimir Dašić (Cyrillic: Владимир Дашић, pronounced [v̞lǎdimir dâʃit͡ɕ]; born 13 May 1988) is a Montenegrin professional basketball player for OKK Balkanski Ris of the Second Montenegrin League. He is 6 ft 10 in (2.08 m) in height and he plays as both a small forward and a power forward.

== Professional career ==
Dašić began his professional career in the Serbia and Montenegro League with Budućnost Podgorica in 2004. There, Dašić made a name for himself and was widely considered at the time as one of the best young players in Europe and attracted interest from many big European clubs.

On 26 August 2009 he transferred to the Spanish ACB League club Real Madrid. At Madrid, Dašić had a limited playing time and with the arrival of Ante Tomić his playing time became even more reduced so he was loaned out to Gran Canaria.

In October 2010 he signed with Lottomatica Roma of the Italian Lega Basket Serie A. In January 2012, he left Lottomatica Roma and signed with Slovenian club Union Olimpija for the rest of the 2011–12 season.

On 4 September 2012 he signed a contract with Beşiktaş. After he was released from his Beşiktaş contract, Dašić signed for KK Metalac Valjevo for the rest of the 2012–13 season.

In January 2014, he signed with Al Ahli Dubai of United Arab Emirates.

On 3 July 2014 he returned after five years to Budućnost Podgorica, signing a 1+1 contract. On 25 April he was released by Budućnost Podgorica. On 5 January 2017 Dašić signed with the Cypriot team AEK Larnaca. His goal was to prepare for the 2017 EuroBasket, but he experienced a severe injury of a ligament and consequently became a free agent in April 2018. After a year and a half of not playing professional basketball, in December 2018 he signed with Zadar of the Croatian League.

On 20 September 2019 he signed with GKK Šibenka. On 2 December 2019 he left Šibenka.

== Personal life ==
Dašić and his girlfriend Marija welcomed their first daughter, Laura, in February 2012. He has two tattoos on his body including a cross on his back with the words which Tsar Lazar said before battle of Kosovo wrapped around it and a dedication to his deceased friend, Ljubo Jovanović who was also a basketball player, with the inscription of his name on a basketball on his left bicep.

His family originates from Berane.

== Montenegrin national team ==
Dašić won the gold medal at the 2005 FIBA Europe Under-18 Championship while playing the Serbia and Montenegro's junior team. He then chose to play for the senior Montenegrin national team.
