= Iosif Koloveros =

Greek basketball player

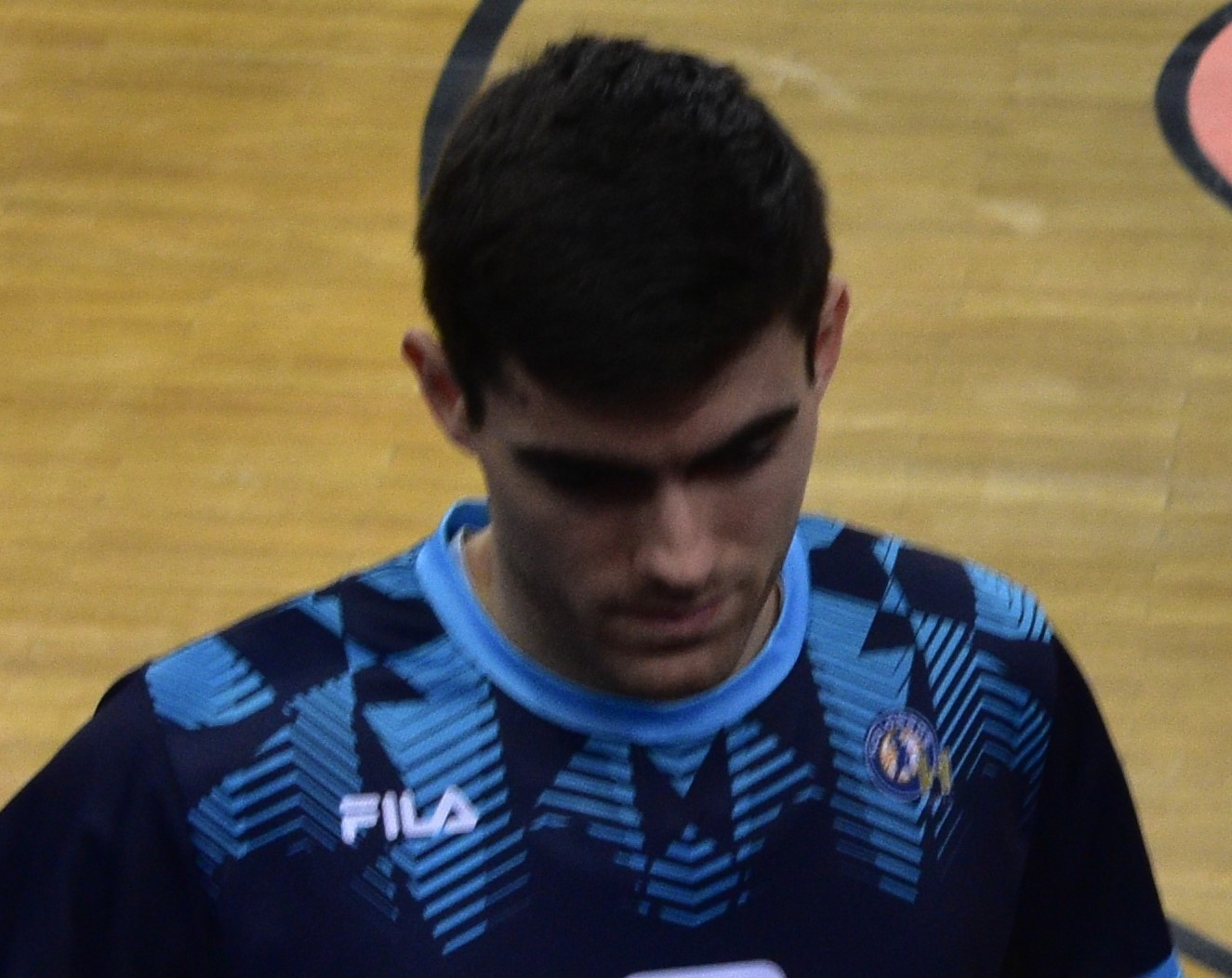
- Koloveros with Kolossos Rodou

No. 6 – Panionios
- Position: Point guard
- League: Greek Basketball League

Personal information
- Born: August 28, 2002 (age 24) Greece
- Listed height: 6 ft 1.25 in (1.86 m)
- Listed weight: 185 lb (84 kg)

Career information
- Playing career: 2019–present

Career history
- 2019–2024: Olympiacos
- 2019–2021: →Olympiacos B
- 2021–2022: →Ionikos
- 2022–2023: →Lavrio
- 2023–2026: Kolossos Rodou
- 2026–present: Panionios BC

Iosif Koloveros (Greek: Ιωσήφ Κολοβέρος; born August 28, 2002) is a Greek professional basketball player for Panionios of the Greek Basketball League. He is a 1.86 m (6'1 1/4") tall point guard.

== Professional career ==
Koloveros began his pro career in 2019, during the 2018–19 season, with the Greek Basket League club Olympiacos. For the 2019–20 season, he was assigned to play in the Greek 2nd Division, with Olympiacos' reserve team, Olympiacos B.

Koloveros spent the 2021–2022 season on loan to Greek Basket League club Ionikos Nikaias. In 20 league games with Ionikos, he averaged 9.6 points, 2.5 rebounds, 2.4 assists and 1.4 steals, playing around 25 minutes per contest.

Koloveros started the 2022–2023 season with Olympiacos, but was loaned to Lavrio on December 8, 2022. In 13 league games with Lavrio, he averaged 7.1 points, 1.5 rebounds and 2 assists, playing around 21 minutes per contest, helping the team to win 7 out of those 13 league games. He also earlier appeared in 2 league games with Olympiacos.

On July 31, 2023, Koloveros signed a one-year deal with Kolossos Rodou. In 20 league games he averaged 7.0 points, 2.2 rebounds and 2.5 assists. On May 25, 2024, he renewed his contract with the club. On June 2, 2025, he renewed his contract until 2026.

== National team career ==
Koloveros played with the junior national teams of Greece. With Greece's junior national teams, he played at the 2018 FIBA Under-16 European Championship, and the 2019 FIBA Under-19 World Cup.
