= Apollon Tsochlas =

Greek professional basketball player

Apollon Tsochlas Απόλλων Τσόχλας
Neaniki Estia Megaridas
- Position: Point guard / shooting guard
- League: Greek A2 Basket League

Personal information
- Born: August 20, 1983 (age 43) Athens, Greece
- Listed height: 6 ft 2.5 in (1.89 m)
- Listed weight: 180 lb (82 kg)

Career information
- Playing career: 2005–present

Career history
- 2005–2008: Doukas
- 2008–2009: Kefallonia
- 2009–2013: Rethymno
- 2013–2020: PAOK
- 2020–2021: Olympiacos B
- 2021–2022: Tritonas
- 2022–2023: Psychiko
- 2023–present: Neaniki Estia Megaridas

Apollon Tsochlas (alternate spellings: Apollonas, Apollona) (Greek: Απόλλων Τσόχλας; born August 20, 1983) is a Greek professional basketball player for Neaniki Estia Megaridas of the Greek A2 Basket League. He is a 6 ft 2 1/2 in (1.89 m) tall point guard-shooting guard.

== Early career ==
Tsochlas started playing basketball with the youth clubs of Aris Glyfadas. He then played with Kefallonia, in the Greek minor divisions, from 2002 to 2005. He is also known his friendship with Alexandros "Kechas" Kechagadiopoulos who played as a point guard for Evriali Glyfadas.

== Professional career ==
Tsochlas made his pro debut in the Greek 2nd Division, with Doukas, in 2005. With Doukas, he played in the Greek 2nd Division in the 2005–06 and 2006–07 seasons, and in the Greek 3rd Division, in the 2007–08 season. He then joined Kefallonias, to play in the Greek 4th Division, for the 2008–09 season.

Tsochlas then played with the Greek club Rethymno, from 2009 to 2013. With Rethymno, he played in the Greek 2nd Division, in the 2009–10 and 2010–11 seasons, before playing in the Greek top-tier level 1st Division, for the first time in his career, in the 2011–12 season. He joined the Greek club PAOK, in 2013.

With PAOK, Tsochlas played in one of the two European-wide 2nd-tier level club competitions, the EuroCup, for the first time, in the 2013–14 season. He also played in the other European-wide 2nd-tier level club competition, the FIBA Champions League, for the first time with PAOK, during the 2016–17 season. In 2017, he re-signed with PAOK, for two more years. On September 6, 2019, Tsochlas again re-signed with PAOK, and he then played his seventh season with the club.

Tsochlas joined the development team of Olympiacos in 2020.
