= Andreas Tsoumanis =

Greek basketball player

Sagrado Corazón Cáceres
- Position: Small forward / power forward
- League: Liga EBA

Personal information
- Born: July 15, 2001 (age 25) Ioannina, Greece
- Listed height: 6 ft 8 in (2.03 m)
- Listed weight: 220 lb (100 kg)

Career information
- Playing career: 2018–present

Career history
- 2018–2021: Olympiacos
- 2019–2020: → Olympiacos B
- 2020–2021: → Eleftheroupoli
- 2021–: Sagrado Corazón Cáceres
Medals
Men's basketball
Representing Greece
FIBA Europe Under-16 Championship Division B
Gold medal – first place	2017 Bulgaria	Under-16

Andreas Tsoumanis (alternate spelling: Antreas) (Greek: Ανδρέας Τσουμάνης; born July 15, 2001) is a Greek professional basketball player for Sagrado Corazón Cáceres of the Liga EBA. He is a 2.03 metres (6 feet 8 inches) tall small forward-power forward.

== Professional career ==
Tsoumanis began his pro career in 2018, during the 2017–18 season, with the Greek Basket League club Olympiacos. For the 2019–20 season, he was assigned to play in the Greek 2nd Division, with Olympiacos' reserve team, Olympiacos B. On September 6, 2020, Tsoumanis was loaned out to Eleftheroupoli for the 2020–2021 season.

== National team career ==
Tsoumanis played with the junior national teams of Greece. With Greece's junior national teams, he won a gold medal at the 2017 FIBA U16 European Championship Division B. He also played at the 2018 FIBA U18 European Championship.
