= Petros Melissaratos =

Greek basketball player

Personal information
- Born: April 10, 1993 (age 33) Athens, Greece
- Listed height: 6 ft 9 in (2.06 m)
- Listed weight: 270 lb (122 kg)

Career information
- Playing career: 2012–present
- Position: Center

Career history
- 2012–2013: Peristeri Athens
- 2013–2014: Panelefsiniakos Athens
- 2014–2015: Nea Kifissia Athens
- 2015–2016: Psychiko Athens
- 2016–2017: Panionios Athens
- 2017–2018: Papagou Athens
- 2018–2019: Kastoria
- 2019–2021: Olympiacos Piraeus B
- 2021–2022: Triton Athens
- 2022–2024: Milon Athens
- 2024: Brampton Honey Badgers
- 2024–2025: Mykonos
- 2025–2026: NE Megaridos
- 2026–: Panerithraikos

Career highlights
- 2x Greek A2 Elite League champion (2024, 2025)

Petros-Charalampos Melissaratos (Greek: Πέτρος-Χαράλαμπος Μελισσαράτος; born April 10, 1993) is a Greek professional basketball player. He is a 2.06 m (6 ft 9 in) tall center.

== Professional career ==
Melissaratos began his pro career in the 2012–13 season, with the Greek Basket League club Peristeri Athens. He also played in the Greek 1st Division with Panelefsiniakos Athens and Nea Kifissia Athens. He joined Olympiacos Piraeus' new reserve team of the Greek 2nd Division, Olympiacos Piraeus B, for the 2019–20 season.

On May 3, 2024, Melissaratos joined Hamilton Honey Badgers of the CEBL.

== National team career ==
Melissaratos was a member of the junior national teams of Greece. With Greece's junior national teams, he played at the 2010 FIBA Under-18 European Championship, the 2011 FIBA Under-18 European Championship, the 2012 FIBA Under-20 European Championship, and the 2013 FIBA Under-20 European Championship.
