= Thomas Zevgaras =

Greek basketball player

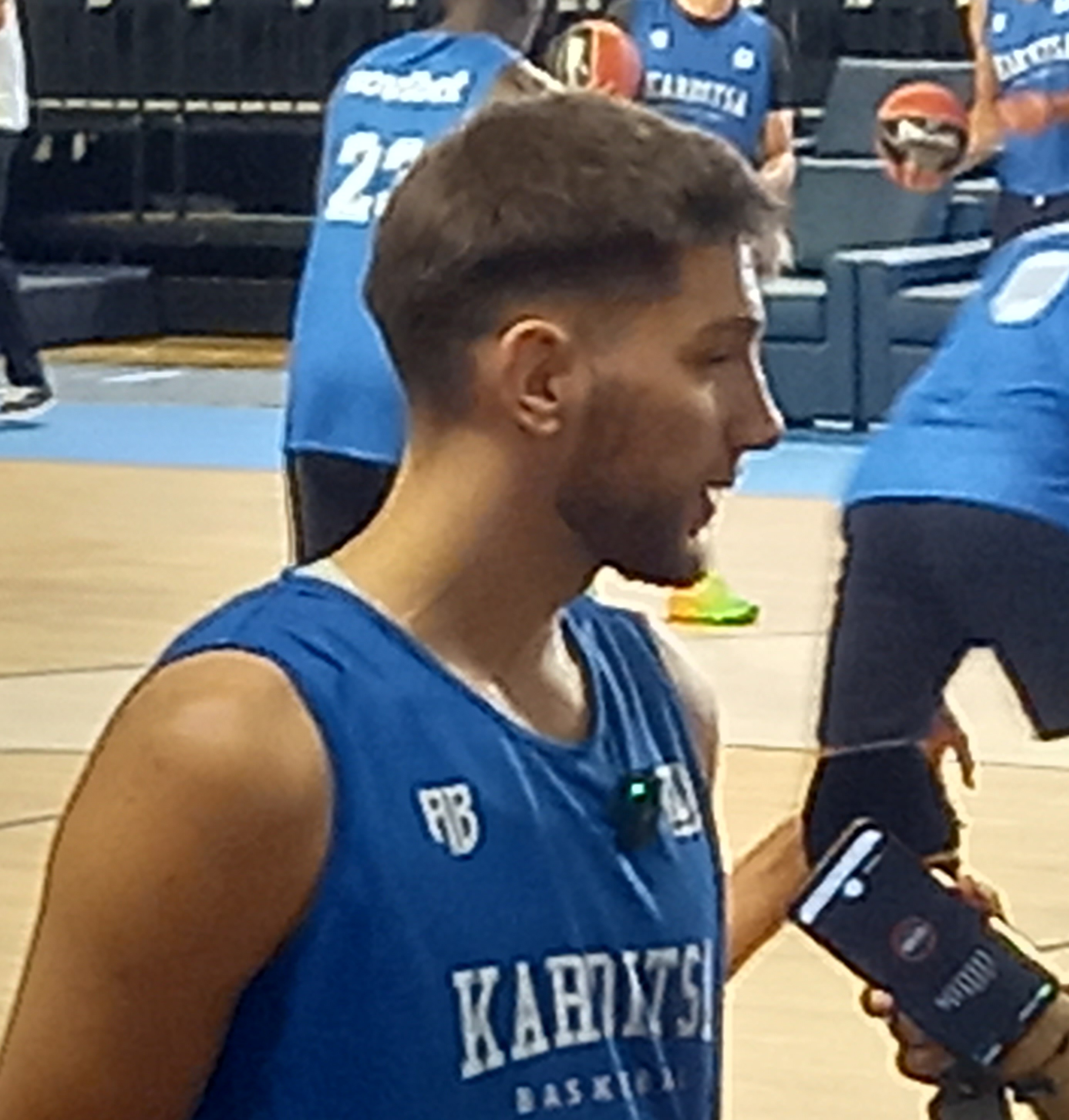
- Thomas Zevgaras is giving an interview in the media in August 2025

Koroivos
- Position: Power forward
- League: Greek Elite League

Personal information
- Born: January 16, 2001 (age 25) Karditsa, Greece
- Listed height: 6 ft 8.75 in (2.05 m)
- Listed weight: 225 lb (102 kg)

Career information
- College: Incarnate Word (2020–2022); Newman (2022–2024)
- NBA draft: 2024: undrafted
- Playing career: 2019–present

Career history
- 2019–2020: Olympiacos
- 2019: →Olympiacos B
- 2019–2020: →Pagrati
- 2024: Esperos Lamias
- 2025: CD Póvoa
- 2025–2026: Karditsa
- 2026–present: Koroivos

Thomas Zevgaras (Greek: Θωμάς Ζευγαράς; born January 16, 2001) is a Greek professional basketball player for Koroivos of the Greek Elite League. He previously played college basketball with the Incarnate Word Cardinals and the Newman Jets. He is a 2.05 m (6'8 3/4") tall power forward.

== College career ==
In 2020, Zevgaras began playing Division I college basketball in the United States with the Incarnate Word Cardinals, in San Antonio, Texas. Two years later, he switched to the Newman Jets of Division II, in Wichita, Kansas.

== Professional career ==
Zevgaras began his pro career in 2019, during the 2018–19 season, with the Greek Basket League club Olympiacos. For the 2019–20 season, he was assigned to play on loan in the Greek 2nd Division, with Pagrati.

On August 5, 2025, Zevgaras signed a three-year deal with Karditsa, returning to his hometown.

== National team career ==
Zevgaras played with the junior national teams of Greece. With Greece's junior national team, he played at the 2016 FIBA Under-16 European Championship.
