= Dovydas Redikas =

Lithuanian basketball player (born 1992)

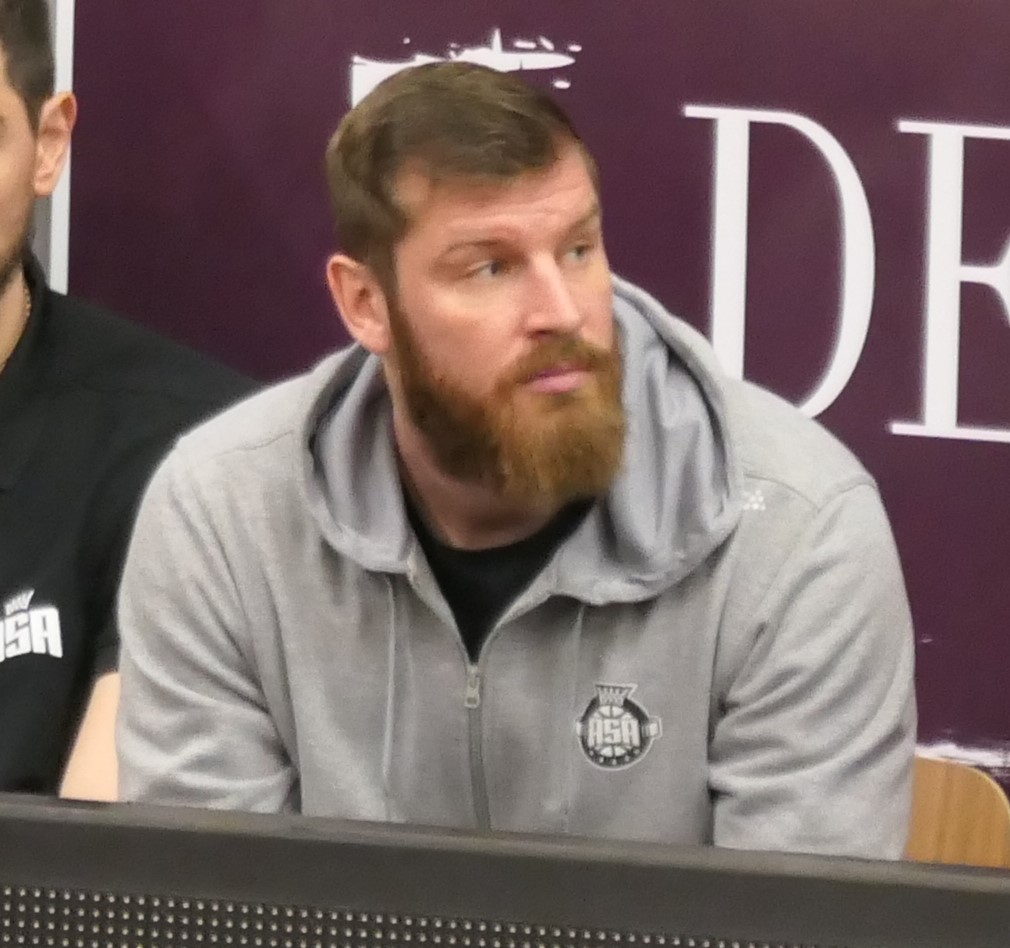
- Redikas in January 2023

Personal information
- Born: 11 December 1992 (age 33) Kuršėnai, Lithuania
- Listed height: 6 ft 4 in (1.93 m)
- Listed weight: 198 lb (90 kg)

Career information
- Playing career: 2008–2024
- Position: Shooting guard

Career history
- 2008–2010: Akademija Vilnius
- 2010–2014: Lietuvos rytas Vilnius
- 2010–2011: →Perlas Vilnius
- 2013–2014: →Pieno žvaigždės Pasvalys
- 2014: Barons/LDz
- 2015: BK Jēkabpils
- 2015: Vytis Šakiai
- 2015–2016: Pieno žvaigdžės Pasvalys
- 2016–2017: Arkadikos
- 2017: Ermis Agias
- 2017–2018: Jonava
- 2018–2019: Apollon Limassol
- 2019–2020: AEL Limassol
- 2020–2021: Kaysersberg Ammerschwihr BCA
- 2022–2023: Alliance Sport Alsace
- 2023–2024: Orchies
- 2024: Colmar Basket
Medals
Men's basketball
Representing Lithuania
FIBA Europe Under-20 Championship
Gold medal – first place	2012 Slovenia	Under-20 Team
FIBA World Under-19 Cup
Gold medal – first place	2011 Latvia	Under-19 Team
FIBA Europe Under-18 Championship
Gold medal – first place	2010 Lithuania	Under-18 Team
FIBA Europe Under-16 Championship
Gold medal – first place	2008 Italy	Under-16 Team
European Youth Olympic Festival
Gold medal – first place	2007 Serbia	Under-15 Team

Dovydas Redikas (born 11 December 1992) is a Lithuanian former professional basketball player.

== Professional career ==
On 13 September 2018 Redikas joined Apollon Limassol of the Cypriot League.

== National team career ==
Redikas won five gold medals with Lithuania's junior national teams. He gold medals at the following tournaments: the 2007 European Youth Under-15 Summer Olympic Festival, the 2008 FIBA Europe Under-16 Championship, the 2010 FIBA Europe Under-18 Championship, the 2011 FIBA Under-19 World Cup, and the 2012 FIBA Europe Under-20 Championship.
