= Sotiris Oikonomopoulos =

Greek basketball player

No. 9 – Panionios
- Position: Point guard / shooting guard
- League: Greek Basketball League

Personal information
- Born: August 29, 2003 (age 23) Athens, Greece
- Listed height: 6 ft 3 in (1.91 m)
- Listed weight: 187 lb (85 kg)

Career information
- NBA draft: 2025: undrafted
- Playing career: 2020–present

Career history
- 2020–2024: Olympiacos
- 2020–2021: →Olympiacos Piraeus B
- 2022–2023: →Panerythraikos
- 2023–2024: →Lavrio
- 2024: Psychiko
- 2024: Ermis Schimatari
- 2024–2025: Promitheas Patras
- 2025–present: Panionios

Career highlights
- Greek League champion (2022); Greek Cup winner (2022)

Sotiris Oikonomopoulos (Greek: Σωτήρης Οικονομόπουλος; born August 29, 2003) is a Greek professional basketball player for Panionios of the Greek Basketball League. He is a 1.91 metres (6 feet 3 inches) tall combo guard.

== Professional career ==
Tsiakmas began playing basketball with Olympiacos. For his first season, he played with Olympiacos B.C. B Development Team. The following season, he was a part of Olympiacos, with whom he won the Greek League and the Greek Cup. In 2022, he was loaned to Panerythraikos.

Oikonomopoulos started the 2023–24 season with Lavrio. On January, he moved to Psychiko for the rest of the season.

On July 30, 2024, he joined Ermis Schimatari of the Greek A2 Elite League. On December 27, 2024, he moved to Promitheas Patras of the Greek Basketball League.

On July 25, 2025, Oikonomopoulos moved to Panionios of the Greek Basketball League.
