= Dimitrios Tsaldaris =

Greek basketball player (born 1980)

Dimitris Tsaldaris Δημήτρης Τσαλδάρης
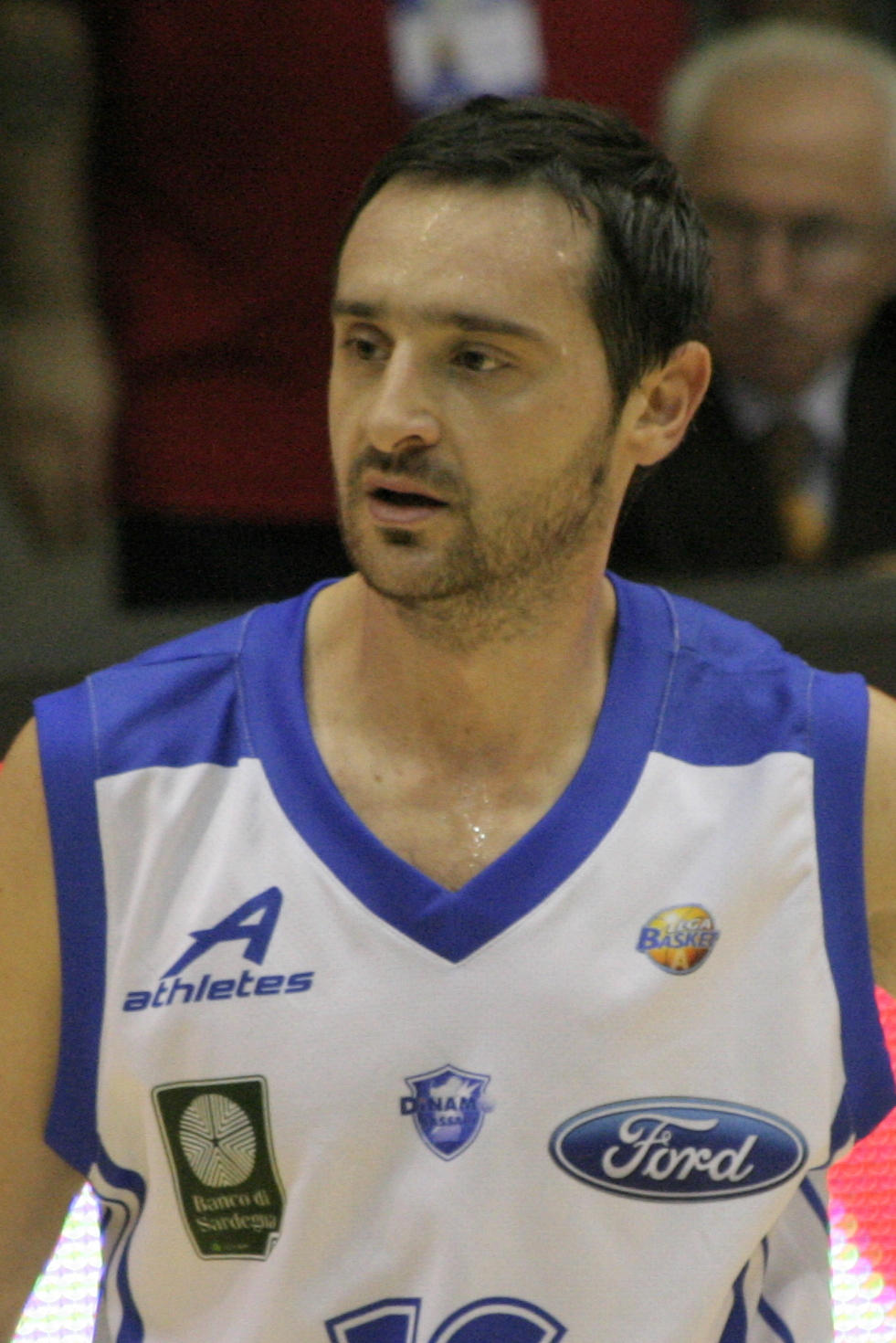
- Tsaldaris with Dinamo Sassari in 2010.

Personal information
- Born: 7 March 1980 (age 46) Piraeus, Greece
- Listed height: 6 ft 5 in (1.96 m)
- Listed weight: 210 lb (95 kg)

Career information
- Playing career: 2001–2018
- Position: Shooting guard / Small forward
- Coaching career: 2018–present

Career history

Playing
- 2001–2004: Alimos
- 2004–2005: Peristeri
- 2005–2006: Panellinios
- 2006–2009: Aris
- 2009: Napoli
- 2009–2010: Montegranaro
- 2010–2011: Sassari
- 2011–2012: Aris
- 2012–2013: Kolossos Rodou
- 2013: Biella
- 2013–2015: AENK
- 2015: KAOD
- 2015–2018: Doxa Lefkadas

Coaching
- 2018–2023: Olympiacos (academies)
- 2019–2021: Olympiacos B
- 2023–2025: Panionios (assistant, interim)

Career highlights
- As player: Greek League Best Young Player (2006); All-Greek League Second Team (2006); 2× Greek All-Star (2008, 2009)

Dimitrios Tsaldaris (alternate spelling: Dimitris) (Greek: Δημήτρης Τσαλδάρης; born 7 March 1980) is a retired Greek professional basketball player and coach. During his playing career, at a height of 1.96 m (6 ft 5 in) tall, he played at both the shooting guard and small forward positions.

== Professional playing career ==
Tsaldaris began his professional career in 2001, with Alimos, in the Greek 2nd Division. He then played with the Greek 1st Division club Peristeri, during the 2004–05 season, and then with Panellinios, during the 2005–06 season. He was voted the Greek League Best Young Player in 2006.

He then transferred to Aris, with which he played in the EuroLeague. In 2009, he moved to the top-tier level Italian League club Napoli. He then moved to the Italian clubs Sutor Montegranaro and Dinamo Sassari. He returned to Aris for the 2011–12 season. He moved to the Greek club Kolossos, in 2012.

In 2013, he joined the Italian side Biella, and the next club he moved to was Greek side AENK. On 6 January 2015, he signed with Greek team KAOD. He then played with the Greek club Doxa Lefkadas, in both the first and second Greek divisions.

== National team playing career ==
Tsaldaris also played with the senior men's Greek national basketball team.

== Player profile ==
During his basketball career, Tsaldaris was a left-handed shooting guard and small forward known for his ball handling, passing, and defense.

== Coaching career ==
After he retired from playing professional basketball, Tsaldaris began his basketball coaching career in 2018, as he became a head coach of the youth academies of Olympiacos. In 2019, he became the head coach of the Olympiacos reserve team, Olympiacos B, of the Greek 2nd Division.

From 2023 to 2025, he was an assistant coach for Panionios of the Greek Basketball League.

== Personal life ==
Tsaldaris was born in Piraeus, Athens, Greece. He is married to Polina, and has a daughter named Despina, and a son named Stelios. In his spare time, he enjoys reading and traveling. His sports idols are Michael Jordan and Dražen Petrović. His favorite movie is Apocalypse Now, and his favorite car is the Nissan GT-R. He thinks of himself as a very quiet and reserved person, who likes to be in a group of friends. His jokes were famous among the players and coaches in the practice sessions of Sutor Montegranaro. With the usual victim of his pranks being his co-player Dejan Ivanov. He considers Željko Obradović as the ideal basketball team head coach, while he considers Juan Carlos Navarro the most difficult opponent he ever faced as a player. He likes any kind of music, and his nickname is "Mitsos". He thinks of the Greek islands as the ideal destination for holidays, and he prefers brunettes to blondes.

== Awards and accomplishments ==
=== Playing career ===
- Greek League Best Young Player: (2006)
- 2× Greek League All-Star: (2008, 2009)
