= Vangelis Tzolos =

Greek professional basketball player (born 1991)

Vangelis Tzolos Βαγγέλης Τζόλος
- Tzolos playing with AEK Athens

Ermis Schimatari
- Position: Point guard / shooting guard
- League: Greek A2 Elite League

Personal information
- Born: 14 August 1991 (age 35) Cholargos, Greece
- Listed height: 6 ft 3.75 in (1.92 m)
- Listed weight: 190 lb (86 kg)

Career information
- Playing career: 2009–present

Career history
- 2009–2013: AEK Athens
- 2013–2014: Filathlitikos
- 2014–2015: Ikaros Kallitheas
- 2015–2016: Ethnikos Piraeus
- 2016–2017: Kymis
- 2017–2018: Doxa Lefkadas
- 2018–2019: Ermis Agias
- 2019–2020: Olympiacos B
- 2020–2021: Koroivos Amaliadas
- 2021–2022: Ionikos Nikaias
- 2022: Grindavík
- 2022–2023: Doxa Lefkadas
- 2023–2024: Proteas Voulas
- 2024–present: Ermis Schimatari

Evangelos "Vangelis" Tzolos (alternate spellings: Vaggelis, Tzollos) (Greek: Ευάγγελος "Βαγγέλης" Τζόλος; born 14 August 1991) is a Greek professional basketball player for Ermis Schimatari of the Greek A2 Elite League. He is 1.92 m (6'3 3/4") tall and he can play at the point guard and shooting guard positions.

== Professional career ==
Tzolos started his professional career playing with AEK Athens in 2009. After playing 4 years with the club, he joined Filathlitikos.

In 2014, Tzolos moved to Ikaros Kallitheas of the Greek 3rd Division. His amazing performances with the club drew the interest of several other clubs, and he finally moved to Ethnikos Piraeus of the Greek 2nd Division. Tzolos was the reserve point guard of the team, behind Fotis Vasilopoulos, and he helped his team to finish in 3rd place in the regular season, and in 4th place in the overall final league standings. On 22 July 2016, Tzolos joined the newly promoted to the top-tier level Greek Basket League club Kymis.

Tzolos joined Olympiacos' new reserve team of the Greek 2nd Division, Olympiacos B, for the 2019–20 season. He spent the following season with Koroivos, averaging 13 points, 3.5 rebounds and 3.5 assists per game.

In November 2021, Tzolos returned to the first division, signing with Ionikos. In 14 games, he averaged 3.7 points and 1.3 rebounds, playing around 13 minutes per contest.

In August 2022, Tzolos signed with Grindavík of the Úrvalsdeild karla. He appeared in four games for Grindavík, averaging 8.3 points and 2.3 rebounds, before leaving in end of October.

On June 16, 2024, Tzolos joined Ermis Schimatari of the Greek A2 Elite League.
