= KB Deçiq =

KB Deçiq/KK Dečić
- Leagues: Prva A Liga
- Founded: 2021
- Location: Tuzi, Montenegro
- Team colors
- Head coach: Simon Ivezaj

Klubi basketbollistik Deçiq (transl. Deçiq Basketball Club), commonly referred to as KB Deçiq or KK Dečić, is a men's professional basketball club based in Tuzi, Montenegro. The club is owned by the Tuzi municipality.

== History ==
In 2022, Deçiq won the Prva B Liga promoting to the Prva A Liga.

== Honours ==
- Prva B Liga (1): 2021–22

== Notable players ==
- (Albania) Robert Shestani
- (Montenegro) Driton Çunmulaj
- (Montenegro) Marko Koljević
- (Montenegro) Marko Mugoša

== See also ==
- KF Deçiq
- Tuzi
