= Domžale Sports Hall =

Multi-purpose indoor arena in Domžale, Slovenia

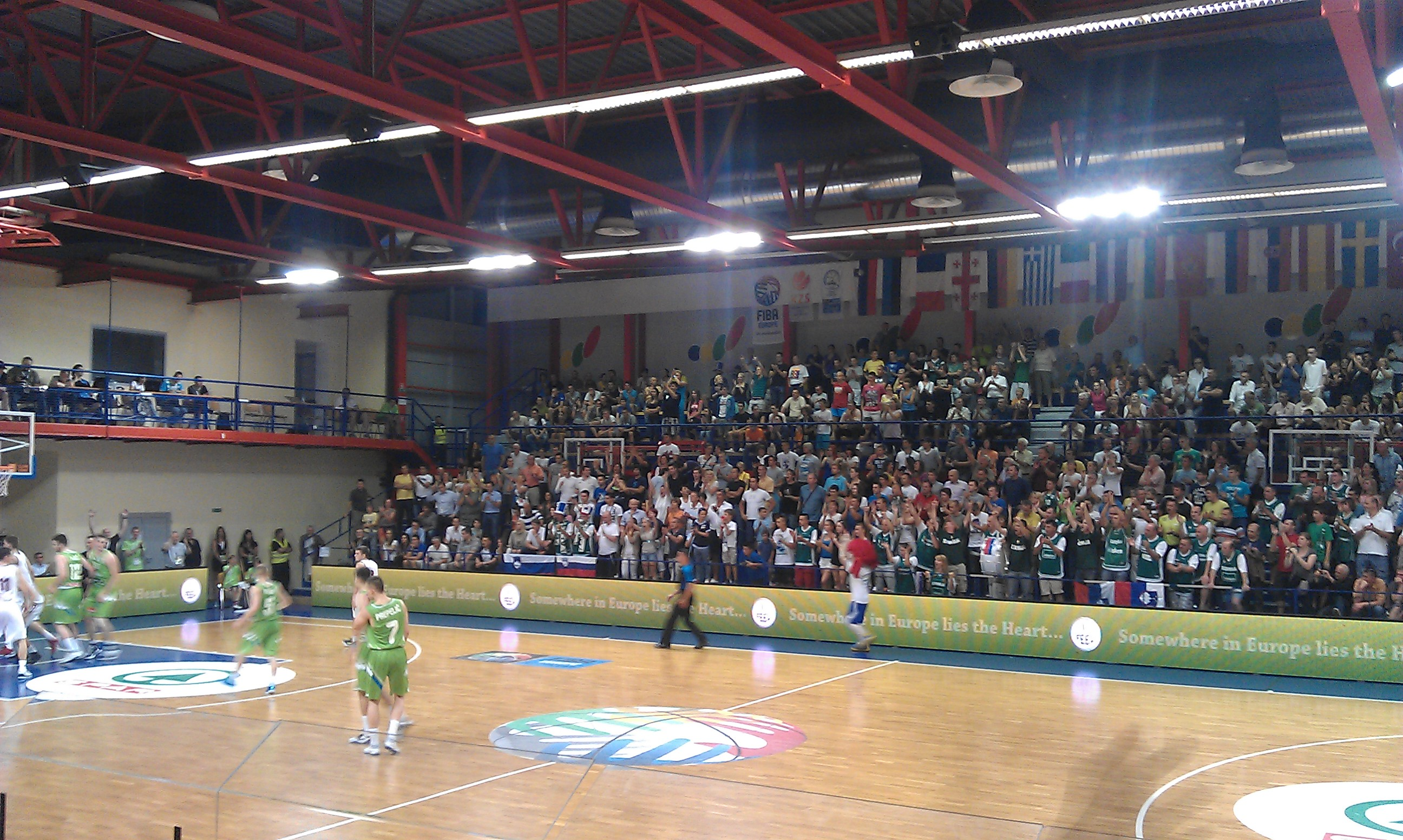
- Interactive map of Domžale Sports Hall
- Location: Domžale, Slovenia
- Coordinates: 46°8′22″N 14°35′42″E
- Capacity: 2,500
- Surface: parquet

Construction
- Groundbreaking: 1963
- Built: 1967
- Renovated: 2004, 2007, 2012

Tenant
- Kansai Helios Domžale

Domžale Sports Hall (Slovene: Športna dvorana Domžale) is a multi-purpose indoor arena located in Domžale, Slovenia. It has a capacity for 2,500 spectators and is mostly used for basketball games. The main tenant is basketball club Kansai Helios Domžale.

It was renovated and expanded in multiple stages. The biggest renovations happened in 2004 and in 2007, when the hall reached its final capacity of 2,500.
