= Olympiacos B.C. B Development Team =

Olympiacos BC's Development Team

Olympiacos B Development Team
- Leagues: Greek 2nd Division; Greek Cup
- Founded: September 2019; 7 years ago
- History: Olympiacos B Development Team (2019–2021)
- Arena: Peace and Friendship Training Facility
- Location: Neo Faliro, Piraeus, Greece
- Team colors: Red and White
- President: Panagiotis Angelopoulos
- Head coach: Dimitris Tsaldaris
- Ownership: Panagiotis Angelopoulos; Georgios Angelopoulos
- Website: olympiacosbc.gr
Home	Away	Third

The Olympiacos B.C. B Development Team (also referred to as Olympiacos II or Olympiacos 2, and known as Olympiacos B.C. B Piraeus Bank for sponsorship reasons) was a short-lived and highly controversial entity created by Olympiacos Piraeus in 2019. Although officially registered as a reserve or development team, it was regarded by many as an artificial construct, established to replace the club’s relegated senior team in domestic competition and to prevent Olympiacos from appearing under its main identity in the Greek second division.

== History ==
Olympiacos Basketball Club B was created in September 2019 as a controversial maneuver by Olympiacos Piraeus to avoid formally competing in the Greek second division, following the club’s relegation from the Greek Basket League to the Greek A2 Basket League.

The senior Olympiacos team had been relegated as a disciplinary sanction imposed by the Hellenic Basketball Federation after the club refused to play and forfeited multiple matches in the 2018–19 Greek Basket League and the 2018–19 Greek Basketball Cup. Olympiacos withdrew its senior team entirely from all Greek competitions, announcing it would compete exclusively in the EuroLeague.

To facilitate this withdrawal and preserve the club’s top-level brand from appearing in the second division, Olympiacos established the B Development Team. Although officially registered as a reserve side, the team functioned in practice as a substitute for the relegated senior team, taking over its place in all Greek domestic competitions.

For the 2019–20 season, Olympiacos B was registered directly in the Greek second division. The B team also replaced the senior squad in the 2019–20 Greek Basketball Cup. At the same time, the actual senior Olympiacos roster continued to exist separately, competing only in the EuroLeague and remaining absent from all Greek competitions.

As an additional disciplinary measure, the Hellenic Basketball Federation imposed a six-point deduction (equivalent to three wins) on Olympiacos B before the start of the season, explicitly linking the penalty to the actions of the senior club.

Despite finishing the season with a strong on-court record of 17–4, second best in the league, Olympiacos B was ultimately classified sixth in the final standings due to the imposed points deduction. The team was also eliminated in the Greek Cup at the Round of 32 stage by Anatolia Thessaloniki.

== Arena ==
Olympiacos Basketball Club B played its home games at the Peace and Friendship Stadium's Training Facility, which is located in Neo Faliro, Piraeus, Athens, Greece.

== Season by season ==
Season	[[Greek basketball league system|Tier]]	Division	Pos.	W–L	W–L [[Playoffs|P.O.]]	[[Greek Basketball Cup|Greek Cup]]	[[Greek basketball clubs in European and worldwide competitions|European competitions]]
2019–20*	2	A2 Basket League	2nd (6th)*	17–4	–	Phase 1 – Round 3	–
2020–21	2	A2 Basket League	2nd (2nd) (promoted)	16-4	2-0	Phase 2 – Round 1	–

* In the 2019–20 season, Olympiacos B Development Team had the 2nd best record in the Greek A2 Basket League's regular season, at 17–4, but they were deducted a total of 6 points (3 wins) by the Hellenic Basketball Federation. That was due to a punishment of the senior club of Olympiacos, for its forfeiting of several Greek Basket League and Greek Cup games, during the previous 2018–19 season. As a result, Olympiacos B Development Team was placed in 6th place in the Greek A2 Basket League's 2019–20 season standings.

== Players ==
=== Current roster ===
Olympiacos B Development Team roster
Players	Coaches
Pos. / No. / Nat. / Name / Ht. / Wt. / Age	Head coach: (Greece) Dimitris Tsaldaris; Assistant coach(es): (Greece) Nikos Barlos; (Greece) Antonis Kourmoulis; Legend: (C) Team captain; Injured; Roster; Updated: September 8, 2021

=== Depth chart ===
Pos.	Starting 5	Bench
C
PF
SF
SG
PG

=== In ===
Note: Flags indicate national team, as has been defined under FIBA eligibility rules. Players may hold more than one non-FIBA nationality.

No.	Pos.	Nat.	Player
	F	(Greece) GRE	Andreas Tsoumanis (from (Greece) Eleftheroupoli) (return from loan)

=== Out ===
Note: Flags indicate national team, as has been defined under FIBA eligibility rules. Players may hold more than one non-FIBA nationality.

No.	Pos.	Nat.	Player
	F/C	(Greece) GRE	Vassilis Christidis (to (Greece) Olympiacos)
	G/F	(Cyprus) CYP	Zayd Muosa (to (Greece) Olympiacos)
	G	(Greece) GRE	Sotiris Oikonomopoulos (to (Greece) Olympiacos)
	G	(Greece) GRE	Alexandros Nikolaidis (to (Greece) Lavrio) (on loan)
	G	(Greece) GRE	Iosif Koloveros (to (Greece) Ionikos Nikaias) (on loan)
	F/C	(Greece) GRE	Panagiotis Tsamis (to (Greece) Panerythraikos) (on loan)
	G	(Greece) GRE	Ilias Moraitis (to (Greece) Panerythraikos)
	G/F	(Greece) GRE	Stathis Papadionysiou (to (Greece) Charilaos Trikoupis)
	SF	(Greece) GRE	Dionysis Skoulidas (to (Greece) Eleftheroupoli)
	C	(Greece) GRE	Kadras Κostas (to (Greece) Eleftheroupoli)
	G	(Greece) GRE	Apollon Tsochlas (to (Greece) Tritonas)
	C	(Greece) GRE	Petros Melissaratos (to (Greece) Tritonas)
	F	(Greece) GRE	Valantis Kourtidis (to (Greece) Doxa Lefkadas)
	C	(Greece) GRE	Nikos Kambouris (to (Greece) Kolossos Rodou)
	F	(Greece) GRE	Andreas Tsoumanis (to (Spain) Sagrado Corazón Cáceres)

== Notable players ==
Note: Flags indicate national team eligibility at FIBA-sanctioned events. Players may hold other non-FIBA nationalities not displayed.

Criteria

To appear in this section a player must have either:

- Set a club record or won an individual award while at the club
- Played at least one official international match for their national team at any time
- Played at least one official NBA match at any time.

Greece:

- (Greece) Nikos Arsenopoulos
- (Greece) Vassilis Christidis
- (Greece) Iosif Koloveros
- (Greece) Petros Melissaratos
- (Greece) Alexandros Nikolaidis
- (Greece) Thomas Nikou
- (Greece) Petros Noeas
- (Greece) Stathis Papadionysiou
- (Greece) Andreas Petropoulos
- (Greece) Dionysis Skoulidas
- (Greece) Andreas Tsoumanis
- (Greece) Apollon Tsochlas
- (Greece) Vangelis Tzolos
- (Greece) Thomas Zevgaras

Europe:

- (Serbia) Aleksej Pokuševski

== Head coaches ==
Head Coach	Years
(Greece) Dimitris Tsaldaris	2019–2021

== Sponsors ==
- Piraeus Bank
