= Igor Trushkin =

Russian futsal player

Personal information
- Date of birth: 17 January 1994 (age 32)
- Place of birth: Russia
- Position: Goalkeeper

Team information
- Current team: Dina Moscow
- Number: 30

Senior career*
Years	Team	Apps	(Gls)
2012–	Dina Moscow	41	(-97)
- * Club domestic league appearances and goals

Igor Trushkin (born 17 January 1994) is a Russian futsal player, who plays for Dina Moscow as a goalkeeper.

== Biography ==
Trushkin is a graduate of Dina. He is a student of the Institute of State and Municipal Management. He made his debut with Dina in the 2012/2013 season. In the following year, he became Russian Futsal Super League champion. He played 41 games and conceded 97 goals for Dina.

== Honours ==
- Russian Futsal Youth League bronze medalist
- Russian Futsal Youth League "Ural-Western Siberia" zone winner
- Russian Central Region Doublers League winner (2012/13)
- Russian Futsal Super League winner (2013/14)
