= Prva B Liga =

Basketball league in Montenegro

- Founded: 2006; 20 years ago
- First season: 2006–07
- Country: Montenegro
- Number of teams: 6
- Level on pyramid: 2
- Promotion to: Prva A Liga
- Domestic cup: Montenegrin Cup
- Current champions: KK Lim Berane (1st title) (2025/26)
- Website: www.kscg.me

The Prva B Liga, also known as Second Montenegrin League, is the second-tier of domestic basketball league system in Montenegro. The competition was founded in 2006.

== History and format ==
During its first season, Prva B Liga (which means First B League) was organized through two groups. But, during the last season, there is one competition.
The winner gains promotion to the Montenegrin Basketball League and the runner-up plays with the bottom five teams of the regular season of the First Erste League. The bottom two teams from the play-out group relegate to the Second League.

== Current teams ==
Team	City	Arena	Capacity
KK Lim	Berane	Hala Sportova Berane	3.000
KK Centar	Bijelo Polje		
KK Rudar	Pljevlja		
KK Stršljen	Gusinje		
KK Zeta	Podgorica		

== Winners ==
Below is a list of Montenegrin Second League (Prva B Liga) champions from its inaugural season (2006–07).

Season	Champion	Runner-up
2006–07	Primorje Herceg Novi	Studentski Centar Podgorica
2007–08	Budva	Kotor
2008–09	Teodo Tivat	UM Podgorica
2009–10	Ljubović Podgorica	Sutjeska Nikšić
2010–11	Sutjeska Nikšić	Podgorica
2011–12	Ibar Rožaje	Centar Bijelo Polje
2012–13	Zeta Golubovci	Gorštak Kolašin
2013–14	Danilovgrad	Mediteran Bar
2014–15	Orion Budva	Studentski Centar Podgorica
2015–16	Primorje Herceg Novi	Orion Budva
2016–17	Berane Bobcats	Centar Bijelo Polje
2017–18	Zeta Golubovci	Stršljen Gusinje
2018–19	All Stars Spuž	Teodo Tivat
2019–20	Canceled due to the coronavirus pandemic	
2020–21	Milenijum Podgorica	Akademik Podgorica
2021–22	Dečić Tuzi	Pljevlja
2025-26	KK Lim Berane	Pljevlja

== See also ==
- Montenegrin Basketball League
- Montenegrin Basketball Cup
