= Stefan Nastić =

Serbian basketball player

Personal information
- Born: November 22, 1992 (age 33) Novi Sad, FR Yugoslavia
- Listed height: 2.13 m (7 ft 0 in)
- Listed weight: 111 kg (245 lb)

Career information
- High school: Thornhill Secondary School (Thornhill, Ontario)
- College: Stanford (2010–2015)
- NBA draft: 2015: undrafted
- Playing career: 2015–2017
- Position: Center
- Number: 4, 22, 32

Career history
- 2015–2016: Crvena zvezda
- 2017: Orangeville A's
Medals
Men's basketball
Representing Serbia
Mediterranean Games
Silver medal – second place	2013 Mersin	Team

Stefan Nastić (Serbian Cyrillic: Стефан Настић, born November 22, 1992) is a Serbian-Canadian former professional basketball player. Standing at 2.13 m (7 ft 0 in), he played at the center position. He played collegiate basketball for Stanford University.

== College career ==
Nastić joined Stanford Basketball in 2010. He appeared in five games off the bench before missing the remainder of the year with a foot injury. As a fifth year senior, Nastić started all 37 games, averaging 13.4 points and 6.5 rebounds. He was All-Pac-12 Honorable Mention pick, Kareem Abdul-Jabbar Center of the Year Award candidate, and was named to Postseason NIT All-Tournament Team, averaging 10.6 points and 7.0 rebounds over five games.

== Professional career ==
After going undrafted in the 2015 NBA draft, Nastić played with the Golden State Warriors and the San Antonio Spurs in the 2015 NBA Summer League. On July 29, 2015, Bosnian club Igokea announced that they have signed Nastić, after which the player denied that he has signed a contract with them. On August 12, 2015, he signed a three-year contract with Crvena zvezda. On May 23, 2016, he parted ways with Zvezda.

== Career statistics ==
Legend
GP	Games played	GS	Games started	MPG	Minutes per game
FG%	Field goal percentage	3P%	3-point field goal percentage	FT%	Free throw percentage
RPG	Rebounds per game	APG	Assists per game	SPG	Steals per game
BPG	Blocks per game	PPG	Points per game	**Bold**	Career high

=== Euroleague ===
Year	Team	GP	GS	MPG	FG%	3P%	FT%	RPG	APG	SPG	BPG	PPG	PIR
2015–16	Crvena zvezda	**2**	**1**	**4.15**	**.286**	.000	.000	**1.5**	.0	.0	.0	**2.0**	0
**Career**		2	1	4.15	.286	.000	.000	1.5	.0	.0	.0	2.0	0

== National team career ==
Nastić was a member of the Serbian national basketball team that won a silver medal at the 2013 Mediterranean Games in Turkey.

== See also ==
- List of Serbian NBA Summer League players
