= Tobias Borg =

Swedish basketball player

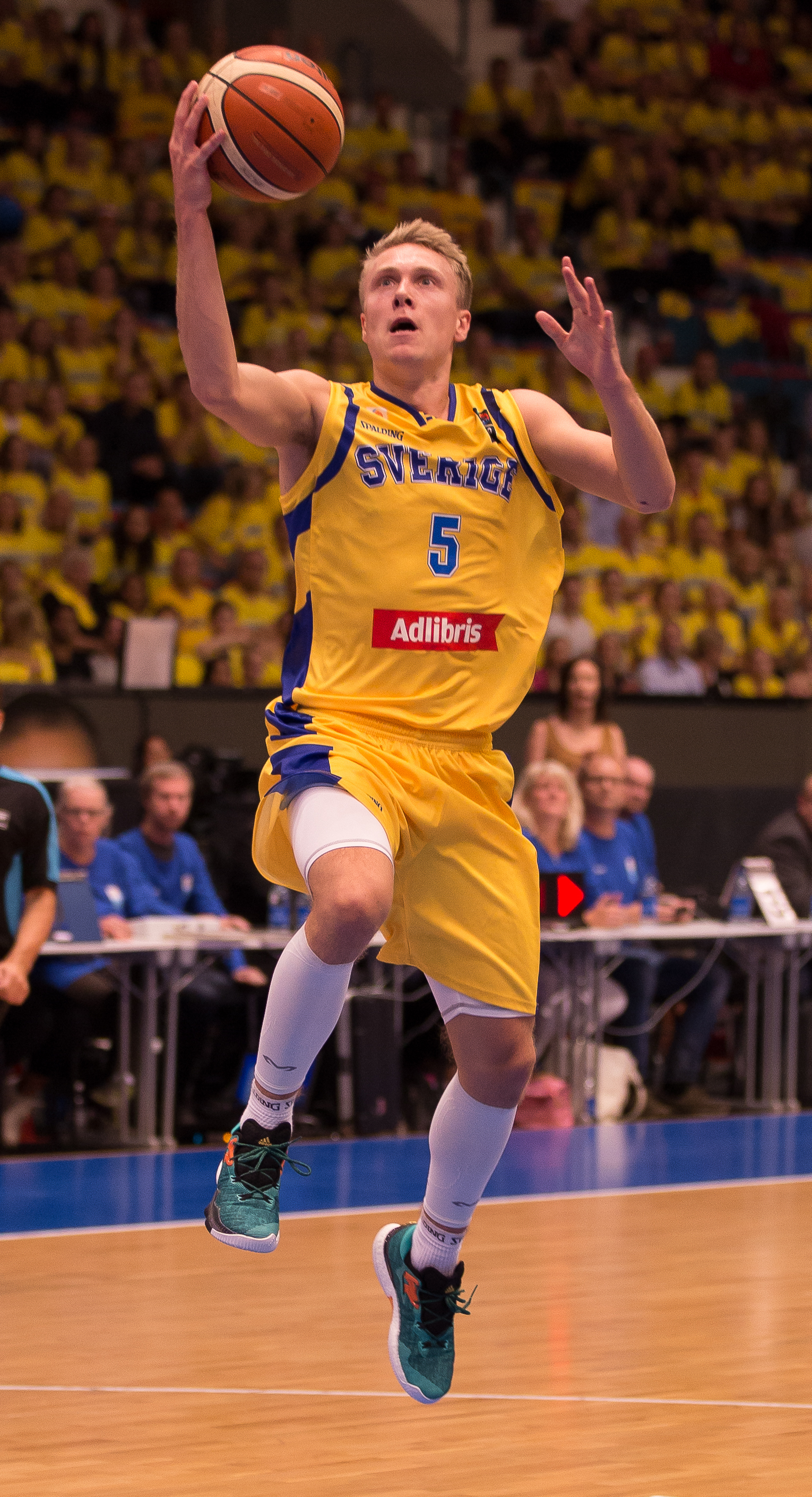
- Borg with Sweden in 2016

No. 6 – Palencia Baloncesto
- Position: Shooting guard
- League: Primera FEB

Personal information
- Born: 2 November 1993 (age 33) Södertälje, Sweden
- Listed height: 6 ft 0 in (1.83 m)
- Listed weight: 169 lb (77 kg)

Career information
- Playing career: 2009–present

Career history
- 2009–2010: Talje BK
- 2010–2014: Södertälje Kings
- 2014–2017: Bilbao
- 2017–2018: Södertälje Kings
- 2018: Iberostar Tenerife
- 2018–2021: Real Betis
- 2021: BC Prienai
- 2021–2022: Lenovo Tenerife
- 2022–2024: Andorra
- 2024–present: Palencia

Career highlights
- Champions League champion (2022); 2× Basketligan champion (2013, 2014)

Tobias Carl Peter Borg (born 2 November 1993) is a Swedish professional basketball player for Palencia of the Primera FEB.

== Professional career ==
Borg began his professional career with Talje BK, during the 2009–10 season. In 2010, he moved to Södertälje Kings and he won two leagues. In 2014, he signed a one-year contract with Bilbao Basket. In 2015, he signed a new two-year contract extension with Bilbao Basket.

On 1 February 2018 Borg signed with Iberostar Tenerife of the Liga ACB. On 14 August 2018 Borg signed a two-year deal with Real Betis Energía Plus of the LEB Oro.

On 9 September 2021 he signed with Lenovo Tenerife of the Liga ACB.

== Career statistics ==
=== National team ===
Team	Tournament	Pos.	GP	PPG	RPG	APG
Sweden	EuroBasket 2025	16th	6	5.5	0.7	0.7
