= Vladislav Trushkin =

Russian basketball player

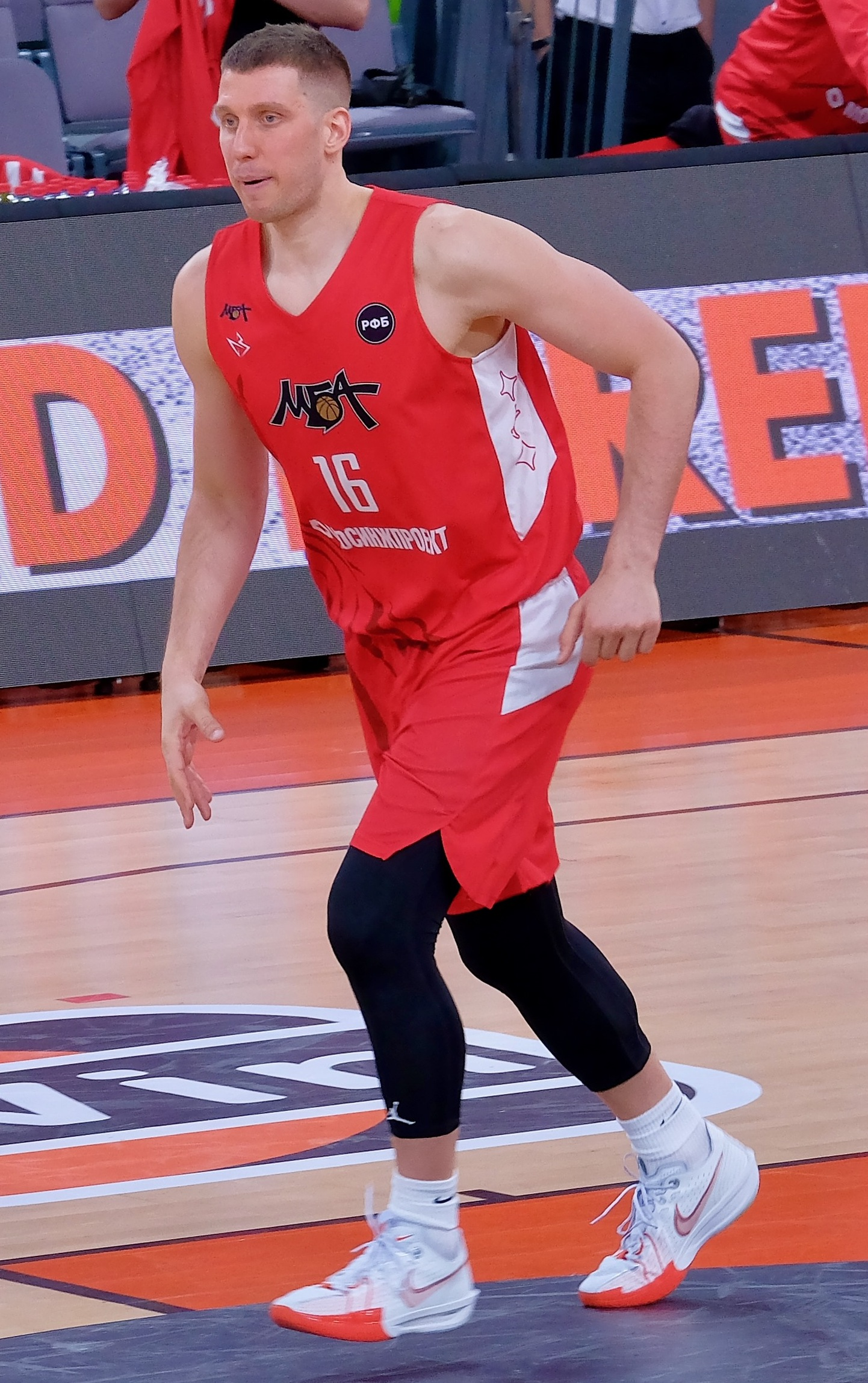

No. 16 – BC Enisey
- Position: Small forward

Personal information
- Born: May 5, 1993 (age 33)
- Listed height: 6 ft 7 in (2.01 m)
- Listed weight: 215.6 lb (98 kg)

Career information
- NBA draft: 2015: undrafted
- Playing career: 2010–present

Career history
- 2010–2013: Spartak Vidnoye Moscow
- 2013–2015: Dynamo Moscow
- 2015–2016: Spartak Primorye
- 2016–2017: Enisey
- 2017–2018: UNICS Kazan
- 2018–2021: Zenit Saint Petersburg
- 2021–: Enisey

Vladislav Trushkin (Russian: Владислав Трушкин; born May 5, 1993) is a Russian professional basketball player who plays for BC Enisey of the VTB United League.

== Professional career ==
Trushkin started his professional career in 2010 with Spartak Vidnoye Moscow. He later played for several Russian clubs, including Dynamo Moscow, Spartak Primorye, Enisey. He signed a contract for 2017–18 season with UNICS Kazan.

In the summer of 2018, Trushkin signed a one-year contract with Zenit Saint Petersburg. In June 2019, he signed a two-year contract extension with the club.
