= 2020–21 Greek A2 Basket League =

Greek A2 Basket League
- Season: 2020–21
- Dates: 3 October 2020 – June 2021
- Teams: 16

The 2020–21 Greek A2 Basket League is the 35th season of the Greek A2 Basket League, the second-tier level professional club basketball league in Greece. The league is organized by the Hellenic Basketball Federation. It is the sixth season with the participation of 16 teams.

== Teams ==
2020–21 Greek A2 Basket League season club locations.

Club	City	Arena	Capacity
Agrinio	Agrinio	Michalis Koussis Indoor Hall	1,500
Amyntas	Athens (Dafni-Ymittos, Dafni)	Pyrkal Ymittos Indoor Hall	600
Apollon Patras	Patras	Apollon Patras Indoor Hall	3,500
Dafni Dafniou	Athens (Chaidari)	Christos Angourakis Indoor Hall	500
Eleftheroupoli Kavalas	Kavala (Eleftheroupoli)	Eleftheroupoli Indoor Sports Center	300
Filippos Verias	Veria	Dimitrios Vikelas Municipal Sports Center	700
ASK Karditsas	Karditsa	Karditsa New Indoor Hall	3,007
Kavala	Kavala	Kalamitsa Indoor Hall	1,650
Koroivos	Amaliada	Amaliada Ilida Indoor Hall	2,000
Maroussi	Athens (Maroussi)	Maroussi Indoor Hall	1,700
Oiakas Nafpliou	Nafplio	Nafplio Municipal Indoor Sports Center	500
Olympiacos B	Athens (Piraeus)	Peace and Friendship Training Facility	250
Pagrati	Athens (Pangrati)	METS Indoor Hall	1,500
Panerythraikos	Athens (Nea Erythraia)	Stelios Kalaitzis Indoor Hall	500
Psychiko	Athens (Psychiko)	Psychiko Indoor Hall	300
Tritonas Sepolion	Athens (Sepolia)	Strefi Indoor Hall	

== Regular season ==
Pos	Team	Pld	W	L	PF	PA	PD	Qualification or relegation
1	Apollon Patras	20	16	4	1530	0	+1530	Promotion to the Greek Basket League
2	Olympiacos B	20	16	4	435	361	+74	Qualification for Promotion Playoffs
3	Eleftheroupoli Kavalas	20	14	6	164	138	+26	Qualification for Promotion Playoffs
4	Maroussi	20	13	7	0	0	0	Qualification for Promotion Playoffs
5	Panerythraikos	20	12	8	67	0	+67	Qualification for Promotion Playoffs
6	Pagrati	20	10	10	545	541	+4	
7	Amyntas	20	10	10	47	79	−32	
8	ASK Karditsa	20	10	10	63	60	+3	
9	Tritonas Sepolion	5	2	3	166	167	−1	
10	Psychiko	5	3	2	149	134	+15	
11	Oiakas Nafpliou	5	2	3	145	175	−30	Qualification for relegation playoffs
12	Dafni Dafniou	6	1	5	141	149	−8	Qualification for relegation playoffs
13	Filippos Verias	4	0	4	74	54	+20	Qualification for relegation playoffs
14	Kavala	6	0	6	76	91	−15	Qualification for relegation playoffs
15	Agrinio BC	0	0	0	0	0	0	Relegation to Greek B League
16	Koroivos	0	0	0	0	0	0	Relegation to Greek B League

Source: Basket.gr

== Promotion Playoffs ==
Semi-finals
2 Olympiacos B	80
5 Panerythraikos	55
3 Eleftheroupoli	102
4 Maroussi	106

Final
Olympiacos B	93
Maroussi	87

== See also ==
- 2020–21 Greek Basketball Super Cup
- 2020–21 Greek Basketball Cup
- 2020–21 Greek Basket League (1st tier)
