= Aleksandr Razumov =

Russian footballer

Personal information
- Full name: Aleksandr Nikolayevich Razumov
- Date of birth: 12 November 1980 (age 45)
- Place of birth: Voronezh, Russian SFSR
- Height: 1.78 m (5 ft 10 in)
- Positions: Defender; midfielder

Senior career*
Years	Team	Apps	(Gls)
1998	FC Fakel-2 Voronezh		
2000–2002	FC Gazovik Ostrogozhsk		
2002	FC Lokomotiv Liski	0	(0)
2003	FC Ural Yekaterinburg	8	(0)
2004	FC Lokomotiv Liski (amateur)		
2005–2007	FC Lokomotiv Liski	64	(1)
2008–2009	FC Zodiak-Oskol Stary Oskol	30	(0)
2009–2010	FC Dynamo Voronezh (amateur)		
2011–2012	FC Khopyor Novokhopyorsk		
- * Club domestic league appearances and goals

Aleksandr Nikolayevich Razumov (Russian: Александр Николаевич Разумов; born 12 November 1980) is a former Russian professional football player.

== Club career ==
He played in the Russian Football National League for FC Ural Yekaterinburg in 2003.
