= Marko Mugoša (basketball) =

Montenegrin basketball player

No. 10 – Danilovgrad
- Position: Shooting guard
- League: Prva A Liga

Personal information
- Born: June 12, 1993 (age 33) Podgorica, Montenegro, FR Yugoslavia
- Listed height: 2.00 m (6 ft 7 in)
- Listed weight: 88 kg (194 lb)

Career information
- NBA draft: 2015: undrafted
- Playing career: 2009–present

Career history
- 2009–2011: Budućnost
- 2011–2012: Podgorica
- 2012–2014: Budućnost
- 2014–2015: Zeta 2011
- 2015–2016: Sutjeska
- 2016–2021: Mornar
- 2021–2023: Lovćen 1947
- 2023–2024: Deçiq
- 2024–present: Danilovgrad

Career highlights
- 4× Montenegrin League champion (2011, 2013, 2014, 2018); 3× Montenegrin Cup winner (2011, 2012, 2014)
Medals
Men's basketball
Representing Montenegro
Games of the Small States of Europe
Silver medal – second place	2017 San Marino	Team

Marko Mugoša (born June 12, 1993) is a Montenegrin professional basketball player for KK Danilovgrad of the Prva A Liga.

== Personal life ==
His surname Mugoša comes from the Albanian tribe Mugoša/Mugosha.
